= Carol Rovira =

Spanish actress and singer

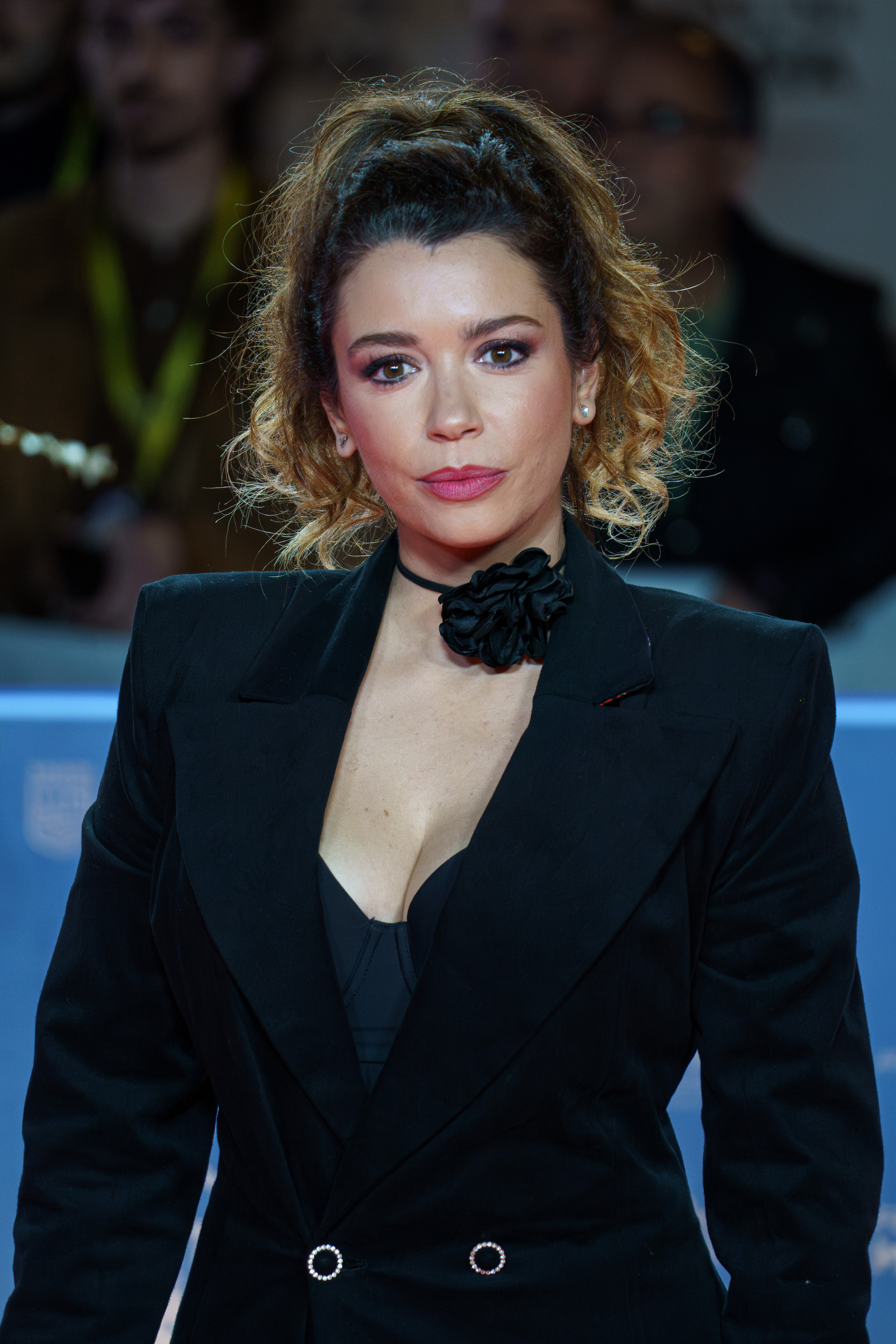
- Rovira in 2025
- Born: 1989 (age 36–37); Province of Tarragona, Catalonia, Spain
- Occupations: Actress, singer

Carol Rovira (born 1989) is a Spanish actress and singer from Catalonia. Her breakout role was her performance in Amar es para siempre playing the role of Amelia Ledesma, whose lesbian romance with Luisita (played by Paula Usero) generated unprecedented online fan following in Spain, prompting two spin-off series: #Luimelia and Luimelia 77.

== Biography ==
Rovira was born in 1989. (Note: Depending on sources, either in Camarles or in "Tarragona", both in the province of Tarragona, Catalonia.) Raised in Camarles (province of Tarragona), she studied musical teaching. Then, she took a year off abroad, and, having returned to Spain, she joined the Barcelona's Institut del Teatre to train as a stage actress.

Rovira started her acting career in stage plays. In 2016, she landed her first notable role in the television series La Riera, aired on the Catalan regional broadcasting service. Her debut in Spain-wide television was her performance in the 2018 series Presunto culpable. She then joined the seventh season of the period drama television series Amar es para siempre to play the role of Amelia Ledesma, an employee at King's club who develops a love story with Luisita (Paula Usero). The lesbian romance generated unprecedented online fan following in Spain, also drawing interest abroad, becoming an LGBTIQ icon. Rovira then reprised the role of Amelia in two spin-offs of the series: #Luimelia and Luimelia 77. The former is a spin-off/reboot transferring the characters of Amelia and Luisita (and their relationship) to 2020 (renovated up to a fourth season), while the latter is a new montage of the year and a half romance between the two characters in the series.

In September 2020, she joined the cast of the comedy television series Señor, dame paciencia (Lord, Give Me Patience), the adaptation of the film of the same name.

== Filmography ==
Television

Year	Title	Role	Notes	Ref
2016–2017	La Riera	Susi Quiroga		
2018	Presunto culpable	Maite		
2018–2020	Amar es para siempre	Amelia Ledesma		
2020–	#Luimelia	Amelia Ledesma		
2020	Luimelia 77	Amelia Ledesma		
2022	Señor, dame paciencia			
2024–2026	Alpha Males	Eva		
