= Carlota Olcina =

Spanish actress

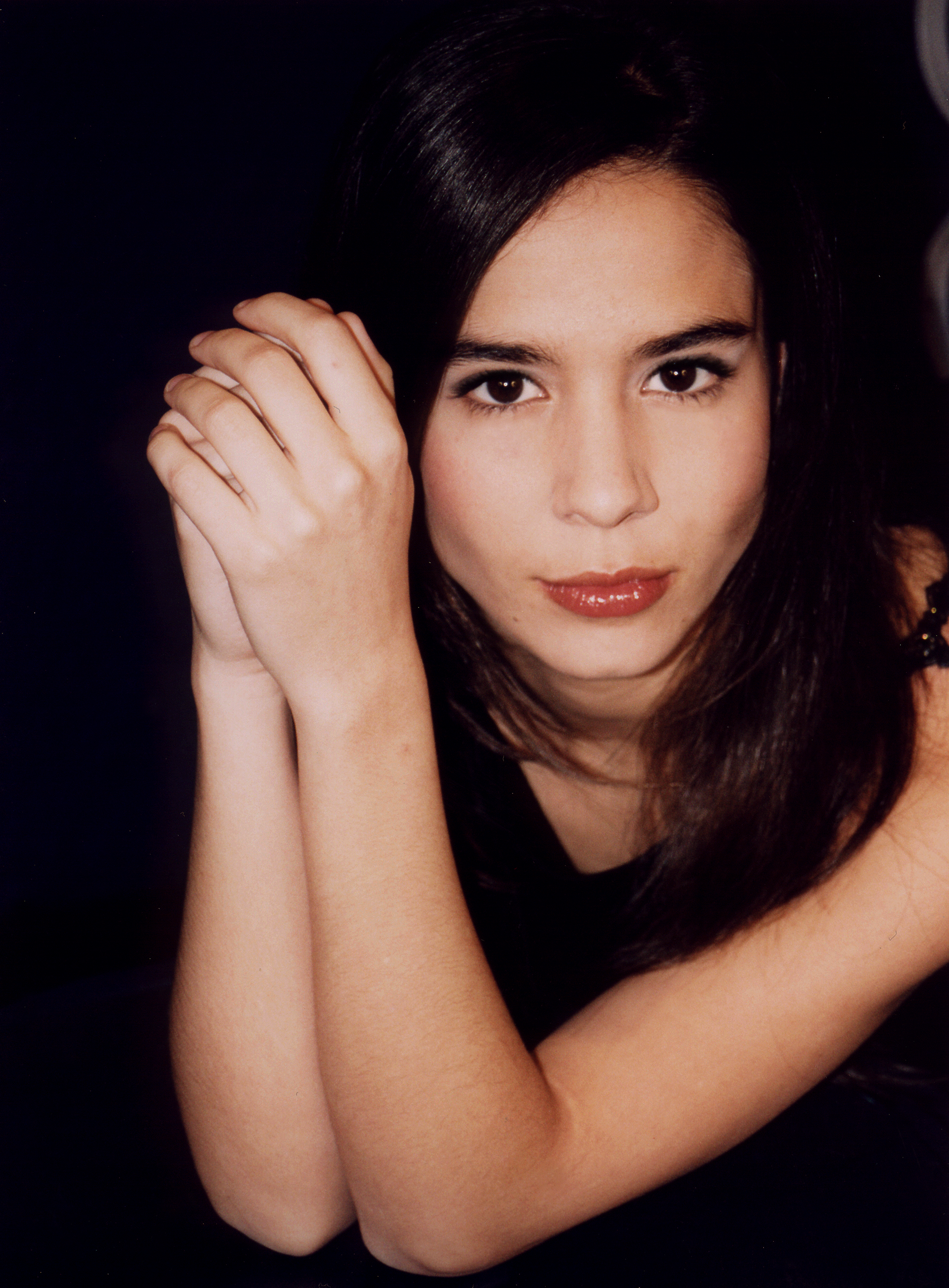
- Carlota Olcina in 2004
- Born: Carlota Olcina Luarna; 21 June 1983 (age 41); Sabadell, Spain
- Occupation: Actress
- Years active: 1998-present

Carlota Olcina (n. Sabadell, 21 June 1983) is a Spanish actress known for her participation in several television series including El cor de la ciutat, Amar en tiempos revueltos and Merlí.

== Biography ==
Born in the neighborhood of La creu de Barberà in Sabadell, she studied theater, music and dance at the Memory School in Barcelona. In 1998 she made her first foray into professional theater with the play Bernadeta Xoc by Marga Puyo. Her first television appearances were in the series Laura and Laberint d'ombres, both o TV3. In the year 2000 she got her first regular role in the TV series El cor de la ciutat on Catalan regional television, where she played Núria Vidal until 2005.

While participating in El cor, Olcina took part in several theatrical productions. In 2000 she participated in the play Terra Baixa, by Ángel Guimerà, directed by Ferran Madico at the TNC. In 2002, under the direction of Sergi Belbel, she was part of the cast of Sábado, domingo, lunes by Eduardo de Filippo, also at the TNC. In 2006 she played Catherine in Arthur Miller's Panorama from the Bridge, directed by Rafel Duran at the TNC. Also that year she participated in El Agresor by Thomas Jonigk, directed by Carme Portaceli at the Nave Ivanow cultural center in Barcelona. Between 2007 and 2008 she starred in Stefan Zweig's Carta de una desconocida with Emma Vilarasau, Ivana Miño and Marta Marco.

In 2008, after having participated in some short films and movies, such as Salvador or El legado, Olcina starred in the mini-series Artemisia Sánchez, which could be seen on TV3 and the Italian channel Rai. Also in 2008, Carlota returned to join one of the longest-running TV series, in this case national, Amar en tiempos revueltos. Olcina played Teresa in the Spanish TV series set in the post-war period until 2012. In 2011 she starred in William Shakespeare's Juliet and Romeo at the Teatro Coliseum in Barcelona and at the Teatro Español in Madrid alongside Marcel Borràs. In 2012 she participated in the play Nuestra Clase by Tadeusz Slobodzianek at the Teatro Fernán Gómez in Madrid. Also that year she starred in Oleanna at the Teatro Borrás in Barcelona under the direction of David Selvas.

Once her participation in Amar was over, she premiered the film El cuerpo, alongside Belén Rueda and Hugo Silva. In 2013 she starred in the series Gran reserva.El origen, alongside Pau Roca and Marta Torné among others. She had a two-episode supporting role in the Spanish TV series Los misterios de Laura, where she played Alejandra. In 2014 she premiered the plays Mata'm by Manel Dueso, at Sala Villarroel in Barcelona, and Pulmons by Ducan McMillan at Sala Beckett and Teatre Lliure, both in Barcelona.

In 2015 she played Petra in the Spanish TV tabletop series Seis hermanas, in which she participated as a recurring character in more than 140 episodes. In 2016 she joined the second season of the TV3 thriller series Nit i dia, playing Clara, a young lawyer. In 2017 she returned to the Catalan channel, this time as the protagonist of the series Merlí, where she played Silvana, the new high school history teacher.

Despite her appearances in series with high ratings, Olcina has been able to combine her work as a television actress with theater. In recent years she has participated in plays that have been highly acclaimed by audiences and critics alike, such as Dansa d'Agost de Brian Fiel, Incendios by Wajdi Mouawad, and L'habitació del costat by Sarah Ruht.

== Filmography ==
- Mi dulce (2001), as Chica 1 - Directed by Jesús Mora Gama.
- El legado (2004), as Inés - Short film. Directed by Jesús Monllaó.
- Salvador (2006), as Carme - Directed by Manuel Huerga.
- Olalla, the shortfilm (2006), as Olalla - Short film. Directed by Menna Fité.
- El Cuerpo (2012), as Erica Ulloa - Directed by Oriol Paulo.
- Vírgenes (2014), as Lena - Short film. Directed by Asier Aizpuru.
- La dignitat (2018), as Daniela - Short film. Directed by David Gonzàlez.

=== Television ===
Year	Series	Character	Channel	Duration
1998	Laura	Silvia	TV3	1 episode
1999	Laberint d'ombres	Judith	TV3	1 episode
2001	Valèria	Olga	TV3	TV movie
2002	El comisario	Alejandra Rosón Espinosa		2 episodes
2007 - 2008	Artemisia Sánchez	Teresa	TV3	4 episodes
2000 - 2009	El cor de la ciutat	Núria Vidal	TV3	1.906 episodes
2008 - 2010; 2011 - 2012	Amar en tiempos revueltos	Teresa García Guerrero	La 1	526 episodes
2013	Gran Reserva. El origen	Manuela Matute	La 1	82 episodes
2014	Los misterios de Laura	Alexandra	La 1	2 episodes
2015	Seis hermanas	Petra Fuentes Martínez	La 1	147 episodes
2016	Nit i Dia	Clara Salgado	TV3	10 episodes
2017 - 2018	Merlí	Silvana	TV3	13 episodes
2021–present	Com si fos ahir	Cristina	TV3	

=== Theater ===
- Bernardeta Xoc, directed by Marga Puyo (1999).
- Terra Baixa, by Àngel Guimerà, directed by Ferrán Madico (2000).
- Dissabte, diumenge, dilluns, by Eduardo de Filippo, directed by Sergi Belbel (2002).
- Almenys no és Nadal, by Carles Alberola, directed by Tamzin Townsend (2003).
- Panorama des del pont, by Arthur Miller, directed by Rafel Duran (2006).
- L’agressor, by Thomas Jonigk, directed by Carme Portaceli (2006).
- Fairy, written and directed by Carme Portaceli (2007).
- Carta d’una desconeguda, by Stefan Zweig, directed by Fernando Bernués. (2007-2008).
- Què va pasar quan Nora va deixar el seu marit o Els pilars de les societats, by Elfriede Jelinek, directed by Carme Portaceli (2008).
- Romeo y Julieta by William Shakespeare, directed by Marc Martínez (2011).
- Nuestra Clase by Tadeusz Slobodzianek, directed by Carme Portaceli (2012).
- Oleanna by David Mamet, directed by David Selvas (2012).
- Mata'm written and directed by Manel Dueso (2014).
- Pulmons by Ducan McMillan, directed by Marilia Samper (2014-2015).
- Dansa d'Agost by Brian Fiel, directed by Ferran Utzet (2016).
- Incendios by Wajdi Mouawad, directed by Mario Gas (2016-2017).
- L'habitació del costat by Sarah Ruht and directed by Julio Manrique (2018).
- Classe by Iseult Golden and David Horan, directed by Pau Carrió (2021).

== Awards ==
- 2010: Lesgaimad Television Award 2010, along with Marina San José, for her role as Teresa García in Amar en tiempos revueltos.
