= Noche de chicas =

- Genre: Thriller
- Created by: Javier Naya; Sergio Cánovas
- Composer: Maxime Rodriguez
- Country of origin: Mexico
- Original language: Spanish
- No. of seasons: 1
- No. of episodes: 6

Production
- Executive producers: Óscar Cifuentes; Sergio Cánovas Rivas
- Producers: Iria Souto Catoira; Estanislao de Aranzadi; Juan Pedro Moreno; Roberto Girault; Jorge García Castro
- Production company: Noche de Chicas AIE

Original release
- Network: Vix+
- Release: 24 February 2023

Noche de chicas is a Mexican thriller streaming television miniseries created by Javier Naya and Sergio Cánovas. The series follows a group of friends who take revenge on sexual abusers. It stars Aislinn Derbez, María León, Leticia Dolera, Silvia Alonso and Paula Usero.

It premiered on Vix+ on 24 February 2023.

== Cast ==
=== Main ===
- Aislinn Derbez as Tess
  - Perla Cerezo as Young Tess
- María León as Lola
  - Veki Velilla as Young Lola
- Leticia Dolera as Elena
  - Lucía Alonso as Young Elena
- Silvia Alonso as Laura
  - Lucía de la Fuente as Young Laura
- Paula Usero as Kira
  - Zöe Millán as Young Kira

=== Recurring and guest stars ===
- César Mateo as Carlos
- Mateo Franco as Diego
- Iñigo Galiano as Luis
- María Martinez as Sophie
- Elena Martín as Matilde
- José Antonio-López Vilariño as Agent Soto
- Raúl Rivera as Agent Navarro
- Rubén de Eguia as Mario
- Jorge Silvestre as Dani
- Juan Carlos Martín as Judge Segarra

== Episodes ==
No.	Title	Directed by	Written by	Original release date
1	"Lo que pasa en el pueblo se queda en el pueblo"	Sergio Cánovas Rivas	Javier Naya	24 February 2023
2	"Enemigo a las puertas"	Sergio Cánovas Rivas	Javier Naya & Sara Alquézar	24 February 2023
3	"Hay que pasar por el taller"	Sergio Cánovas Rivas	Javier Naya & Carolina Daza León	24 February 2023
4	"Al calor de un buen fuego"	Sergio Cánovas Rivas	Javier Naya & Carolina Daza León	24 February 2023
5	"Que se le van las vitaminas"	Sergio Cánovas Rivas	Javier Naya & Carolina Daza León	24 February 2023
6	"¿Ahora qué hacemos?"	Sergio Cánovas Rivas & Antonio Díaz Huerta	Javier Naya & Carolina Daza León	24 February 2023
