= Nuria Gago =

Spanish actress

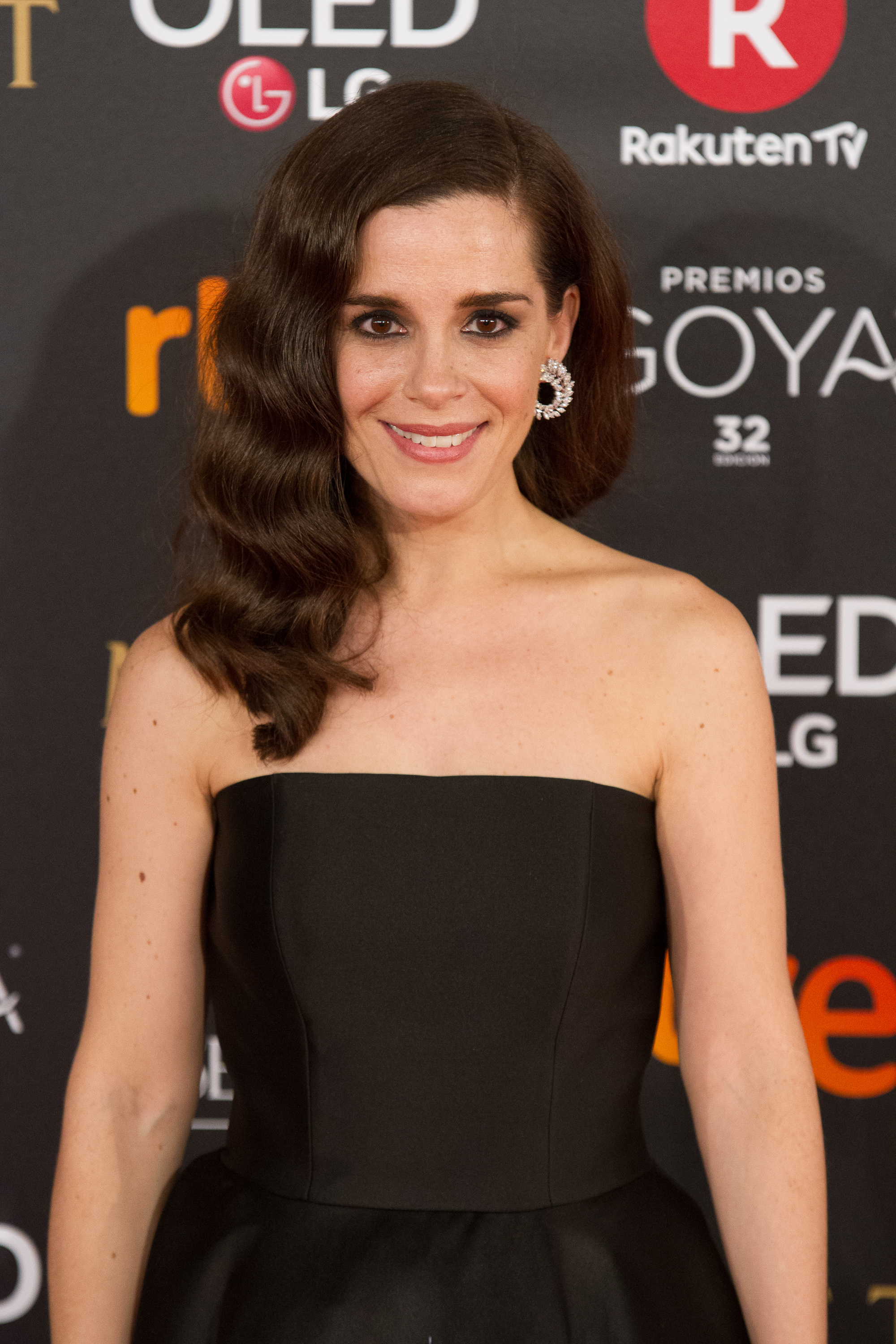
- Nuria Gago in 2018
- Born: Nuria Gago Roca; 10 March 1980 (age 46); Barcelona, Spain
- Occupation: Actress
- Years active: 2001-present

Nuria Gago (Moncada i Reixach, Spain, 10 March 1980) is a Spanish film and television actress and writer.

== Biography ==
Born in Barcelona, she spent her youth in Moncada i Reixach, where most of her family lives. Núria attended primary school at the Sagrat Cor school in Moncada i Reixach. She was a model student and always wanted to be an actress.

She became known in the Catalan TV3 series El cor de la ciutat, where she played Rut between 2000 and 2003. Some time before, she had participated in an amateur theater group in Montcada i Reixach, Dèria Teatre, dedicated to street theater, classical theater, etc.

In 2003 she took her first step to the big screen with Noviembre by Madrid director Achero Mañas. The following year she was selected to play the role of Fany in the film Héctor, by director Gracia Querejeta. This performance earned her a Goya nomination for best new actress.

Since 2004 she was part of the recurring cast of the series Mis adorables vecinos, on Antena 3, where she played Laura Sandoval until the final season of the series in 2006. After participating in successful series such as Hospital Central in a capitular way, in TV movies such as Serrallonga, and films such as Tu vida en 65' and Ciudad en celo; in 2008, Gago returned to television to join the cast of the medical series MIR, broadcast on Telecinco for two seasons. At the same time, he also joined the cast of the second season of the series Herederos on TVE.

In 2011 she returned to the house where she was born to star in the TV3 series Kubala, Moreno i Manchón, alongside Marc Cartes and Jordi Martínez. Gago played Helena Manchón, a recently graduated criminologist who starts working in the private detective office "Solé y Moreno", during the three seasons it was on the air. Also that year she premiered the films Primos, by Daniel Sánchez Arévalo and No tengas miedo by Montxo Armendáriz.

In 2014, she joined the cast of the second season of Antena 3's afternoon series Amar es para siempre, playing Clara. Despite the announcement that her character would leave the series in the third season, finally, both she and the character of Álex Barahona, participate in the fourth season of the series until finally leaving it in September 2016. In 2015 she has a supporting role in the debut film of director Leticia Dolera Requisitos para ser una persona normal. She is also part of the choral cast of Incidencias, a comedy directed by José Corbacho and Juan Cruz.

In 2015 she published her first novel, Cuando volvamos a casa, with Grupo Planeta.

In spring 2016 she joined the second season of the series Citas, broadcast on Catalan regional television. Gago played Olga in three of the episodes of the series and shared scenes with Alfonso Bassave and Julio Manrique. In 2018 she won the Azorín Novel Prize, awarded by the publishing house Planeta, with the work "Quiéreme siempre", a dialogue between two women and a love song to old age.

== Filmography ==
=== Television ===
Year	Series	Character	Channel	Duration
2001 - 2003	El cor de la ciutat	Rut	TV3	
2002	Mirall trencat	Criada	TV3	1 episode
2004 - 2006	Mis adorables vecinos	Laura Sandoval	Antena 3	62 episodes
2005	Más que hermanos	Lola	TV3, Canal Sur y TVG	TV Movie. Directed by Ramón Costafreda
2007 - 2008	MIR	Gloria Calatayud	Telecinco	26 episodes
2008	Hospital Central	Gloria Calatayud	Telecinco	1 episode: Los restos del naufragio
2008	Serrallonga, la llegenda del bandoler	Joana Massissa	TV3 y La 1	Miniseries, 2 episodes
2008 - 2009	Herederos	Lorena	La 1	10 episodes
2010	Ojo por ojo	Eulalia Torrents	TV3 y La 1	Miniseries, 2 episodes
2012	Toledo, cruce de destinos	Cristina	Antena 3	1 episode: Traición
2012 - 2014	Kubala, Moreno i Manchón	Helena Manchón i Vendrell	TV3	39 episodes
2014 - 2016	Amar es para siempre	Clara Gómez Cortina	Antena 3	370 episodes
2016	Cites	Olga Ballart	TV3	3 episodes
2019	Mira lo que has hecho	Begoña	Movistar+	3 episodes
2019	La dama del cuadro	Àngels	TV3, Canal Sur, TVG and ETB-2	TV Movie. Directed by Juan Miguel del Castillo
2019 - 2021	Com si fos ahir	Xesca	TV3	
2020	En casa	Nuria	HBO	1 episode: Mi jaula

=== Feature films ===
- Noviembre, as Helena. Directed by Achero Mañas (2003)
- Héctor, as Fany. Directed by Gracia Querejeta (2004)
- Tu vida en 65', as Carmen. Directed by María Ripoll (2006)
- Faltas leves, as Aitana. Directed by Manuel Valls and Jaume Bayarri (2006)
- Ciudad en celo, as Inés. Directed by Hernán Gafet (2006)
- Una mujer invisible, as Marina. Directed by Gerardo Herrero (2007)
- Proyecto dos, as Emilia. Directed by Guillermo Groizard (2008)
- Primos, as Yolanda. Directed by Daniel Sánchez Arévalo (2011)
- No tengas miedo, as Maite. Directed by Montxo Armendáriz (2011)
- Family tour, as Liliana "Lili" Torres. Directed by Liliana Torres (2011)
- Requisitos para ser una persona normal, as Noelia. Directed by Leticia Dolera (2015)
- Incidencias, as Sara. Directed by José Corbacho and Juan Cruz (2016)
- Verónica. Directed by Paco Plaza (2017)
- Gente que viene y bah, as Chavela. Directed by Patricia Font (2019)
- 7 razones para huir. Directed by Gerard Quinto, Esteve Soler and David Torras (2019)

=== Short films ===
- En nombre de Dios, supporting actress. Directed by Roberto Castón (2001)
- ¿Lo quieres saber?, as Sol. Directed by Pedro Moreno del Oso (2009)
- Dímelo a la cara, as Sofía. Directed by Eder García (2010)
- Té y fantasmas, supporting actress. Directed by Sintu Amat (2011)
- Adentro, supporting actress. Directed by Pau Camarassa (2011)
- Alba, as Ana. Directed by Isak Férriz (2012)
- 3x2, as Nuria. Directed by Leticia Dolera (2016)
- Marcianos de Marte, as Laura. Directed by Fernando Trullols (2016)
- Destino, as Marta. Directed by Marta Juanola (2017)
- Miss Wamba, as Susana. Directed by Estefanía Cortés (2017)
- Divorcio, as Nuria. Directed by Bárbara Santa-Cruz (2018)

=== Theater ===
- Peter Pan, of the company Catacrac Teatre
- Espectáculo sobre textos by Bertolt Brecht. Directed by David Plana
- LorcaLorca, of the company Dèria Teatre
- Fragmentos de la víscera exquisita. Various directors
- Pericles, by William Shakespeare. Directed by Ferrán Audí

=== Advertising ===
- Dentix, dental insurance. Advertising included in the intermission of Amar es para siempre on Antena 3 (2015)

== Books ==
- Cuando volvamos a casa (2015)
- Quiéreme siempre (Premio Azorín, 2018)

== Awards and nominations ==
- Nominated for Best New Actress at the XIX Goya Awards for her role as Fany in Héctor (2004).
- Nominated for Best Supporting Actress at the Actors Union Awards for her role as Fany in Héctor (2004).
- Nominated to the C.E.C. Awards for her role as Fany in Héctor (2004).
