= Gorka Otxoa =

Spanish comedian and actor (born 1979)

- Born: Gorka Otxoa Odriozola; January 13, 1979 (age 47); Irún, Gipuzkoa, Spain
- Occupation: Actor
- Website: http://www.gorkaotxoa.com

Gorka Otxoa Odriozola (born 13 January 1979 in Irún, Gipuzkoa, Spain) is a Spanish comedian and actor.

== Biography ==
Otxoa began in minor roles in several TV series. He had an important role in the Basque series Goenkale until his character's death due to a foodborne illness. He is best known for the ETB sketch-program Vaya Semanita.

In 2009 Otxoa was on the cast of the Spanish adaptation of the US sketch comedy Saturday Night Live.

In 2017 he starred in the play Bajo Terapia in Madrid.

== Filmography ==
=== Film ===
- El Palo (comedia (2001)
- Noviembre (2003)
- Etxera (2004)
- Limoncello (2007)
- Un poco de chocolate (2008)
- Pagafantas (2009)
- ¿Estás Ahí? (2010)
- Lobos de Arga (2011)
- Bypass (2012)
- Los miércoles no existen (2015)
- Reevolution (2016)
- Love at First Kiss (2023)

=== Television ===
- El Comisario (2000–2002)
- Hospital Central (2002)
- Cuéntame como pasó (2002–2004)
- Goenkale (2003)
- Martin (2003)
- Vaya Semanita (2003–2004)
- Los Serrano (2005)
- Tirando a dar (2006)
- Mi querido Klikowsky (2006–2010)
- Cafetería Manhattan (2007)
- Cuestión de sexo (2007–2009)
- Saturday Night Live (2009)
- Doctor Mateo (2009–2011)
- Qué vida más triste (2010)
- Plaza de España (2011)
- Vive cantando (2013–2014)
- Águila Roja (2015)
- Aupa Josu (2015)
- Velvet (2015–2016)
- Allí abajo (2017–2018)
- A Private Affair (2022)
- Alpha Males (2022)

== Stage ==
- Olvida los tambores (2009) by Ana Diosdado
- The Mousetrap (2010) by Agatha Christie
- Bajo Terapia (2017)
