= Lord, Give Me Patience =

- Theatrical release poster
- Spanish: Señor, dame paciencia
- Directed by: Álvaro Díaz Lorenzo
- Written by: Álvaro Díaz Lorenzo
- Produced by: Mercedes Gamero; Mikel Lejarza; José Manuel Lorenzo; Antonio P. Pérez
- Starring: Jordi Sánchez; Megan Montaner; Silvia Alonso; Eduardo Casanova; Salva Reina; David Guapo; Boré Buika; Rossy de Palma; Andrés Velencoso; Paco Tous; Antonio Dechent; Diego Paris
- Cinematography: Valentín Álvarez
- Edited by: Verónica Callón
- Music by: Julio de la Rosa
- Production companies: DLO Producciones; Suroeste Films; Atresmedia Cine
- Distributed by: Warner Bros. Pictures España
- Release date: 16 June 2017
- Running time: 91 minutes
- Country: Spain
- Language: Spanish
- Budget: €4.6 million
- Box office: €6.7 million

Lord, Give Me Patience (Spanish: Señor, dame paciencia) is a 2017 Spanish comedy film directed by Álvaro Díaz Lorenzo.

== Plot ==
After the sudden death of his wife, Gregorio - a grumpy conservative Real Madrid fanatic - has to carry out her final wish: to spend a weekend with his children and their partners in Sanlúcar de Barrameda and throw her ashes into the Guadalquivir river.

Gregorio's daughter Sandra is married to Jordi, a Catalan and diehard Barcelona supporter, who wants to send Gregorio's future granddaughter to a bilingual Catalan-English school in Barcelona.

They are joined by Gregorio's other daughter, Alicia, who is going out with an anarchic hippy named Leo, and his son Carlos, to whom he has not spoken since Carlos announced he was homosexual six months ago. Carlos arrives with his boyfriend Eneko, a Basque of Senegalese origin, far from the ideal partner Gregorio would have envisioned for his son.

This trip to the south of Spain puts this dysfunctional family's capacity for forgiveness to the test, and sees them forced to accept each other, warts and all.

== Cast ==
- Jordi Sánchez as Gregorio
- Rossy de Palma as Maria
- Megan Montaner as Sandra
- Silvia Alonso as Alicia
- Eduardo Casanova as Carlos
- David Guapo as Jordi
- Andrés Velencoso as Alejandro
- Paco Tous as Padre Salcedo
- Salva Reina as Leo
- Boré Buika as Eneko
- Antonio Dechent as Guardia Civil
- Jorge Sanz as Hombre after
- Alberto Jo Lee as Haruki
- Paula Gómez as Carmen
- María Cabrera as Pepa
- César Oliver as Luis

== Reception ==
The film was a commercial success in Spain, being the second most watched film of the first half of 2017.

However, it received mixed-to-poor reviews from critics. Jordi Costa, writing for El País, complained of the film's lack of comic timing, and added, "The figure of a policeman, who bellows 'Gibraltar is Spanish!' reflects the type of viewer for this kind of product." ABC gave the film two stars out of five, criticising the "vulgar metaphor" of using various characters to reflect "Spain today", but notes that such films often have more commercial than critical success.

== See also ==
- List of Spanish films of 2017
