= Pepa Pedroche =

Spanish actress

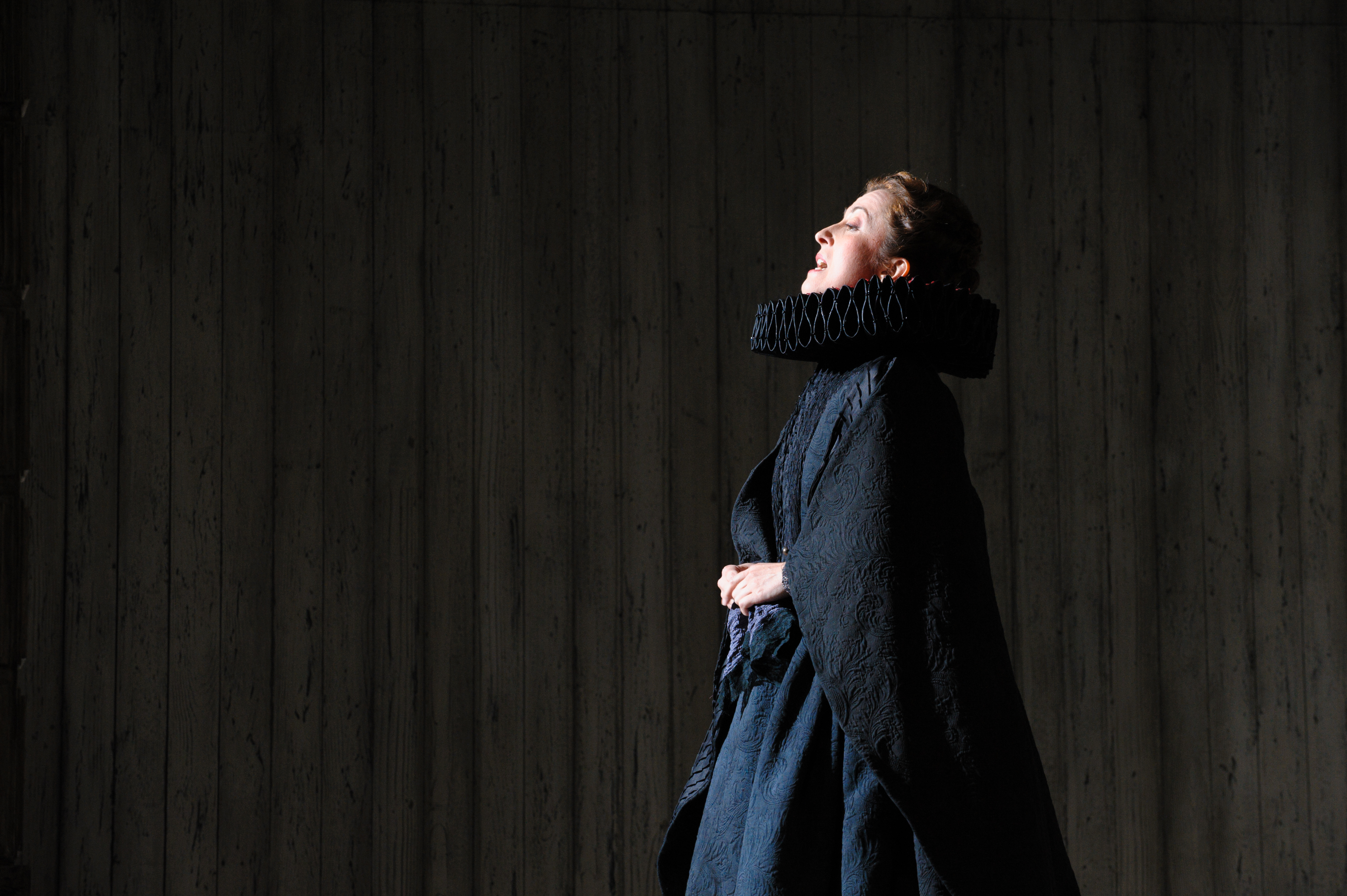
- Born: 18 August 1967 (age 57); Madrid, Spain
- Occupation: Actress

Pepa Pedroche (born 18 August 1967) is a Spanish actress.

== Biography ==
Pedroche has worked in theatre, film, and television. Her films include Paper Castles, Pan's Labyrinth, The Ugliest Woman in the World and The Other Side. She has appeared in the television series Amar en tiempos revueltos, for which she won the Actors and Actresses Union Award for Best Television Performance in a Minor Role in 2009. In theatre, she was nominated for a Max Award in 2002 for Don Juan o el festín de piedra.
