= Itziar Miranda =

Spanish actress, television presenter and writer (born 1978)

- Miranda in 2013
- Born: September 21, 1978 (age 48); Zaragoza, Spain
- Occupations: Actress; television presenter; writer
- Years active: 1998–present
- Spouse: Nacho Rubio
- Children: 2

Itziar Miranda (born 21 September 1978) is a Spanish actress, television presenter and writer. She is best known for playing Manuela "Manolita" Sanabria in the daily period drama Amar en tiempos revueltos (2005–2012) and its continuation Amar es para siempre (2013–2024), a role she played for 19 years across more than 4,200 episodes.

After the series ended, Miranda moved into presenting, hosting the Aragón TV interview programme Tenía que ser de aquí and the La 1 game show La pirámide.

== Early life ==
Miranda was born in Zaragoza on 21 September 1978. Her father was a doctor whose postings took the family to Estadilla, a village in the province of Huesca, where she lived from the age of five until she was seventeen, when she persuaded her parents to let her move to Madrid to study.

== Career ==
=== Early roles ===
Miranda trained in drama at the Ensayo 100 school in Madrid and made her first television appearances in series such as Periodistas and Ana y los 7. Her early film work included Nada en la nevera, Celos, El arte de morir and Corazón de bombón.

=== Amar en tiempos revueltos and Amar es para siempre ===
In 2005, aged 25, Miranda was cast as Manolita Sanabria in the daily period drama Amar en tiempos revueltos on La 1. When the production moved to Antena 3 in 2013 as Amar es para siempre, she continued in the role; the series ended on 6 March 2024, after twelve seasons and 2,829 episodes.

=== Theatre ===
In 2018 Miranda made her debut at the International Classical Theatre Festival of Mérida, appearing in Nerón alongside Raúl Arévalo.

=== Later roles ===
In 2020 Miranda starred in the Aragón TV comedy El último show, whose eight episodes were later added to the HBO España catalogue. In 2025 she played Brianda, a strict teacher, in Física o química: La nueva generación, Atresplayer's revival of Física o Química, which premiered on 16 February 2025, and appeared in the film Cariñena, vino del mar. In 2026 she joined the main cast of the second season of the drama series Entre tierras, released on Atresplayer on 15 March 2026.

== Television presenting ==
Miranda first worked as a presenter in 2004, co-hosting the Telemadrid youth programme Madrid+Joven with Luis Miguel Torrecillas. She returned to presenting with Tenía que ser de aquí on Aragón TV, an interview programme about well-known Aragonese figures; its episode dedicated to Pau Donés won the best audiovisual award at the 26th Premios de la Música Aragonesa in March 2025. In 2024 she also competed in the ninth series of MasterChef Celebrity. In July 2025 she began presenting La pirámide, La 1's adaptation of the American game show format created by Sony Pictures Television, her first time hosting a game show; it premiered on 18 July and has aired daily on La 1 and RTVE Play.

== Writing ==
With her brother Jorge, Miranda writes the Colección Miranda, published by Edelvives, a series of children's books about great women of history that has been translated into languages including Romanian, Russian and Ukrainian; the collection was invited to the Guadalajara International Book Fair in Mexico. In 2021 she, Jorge Miranda and her husband Nacho Rubio launched Miranda y Tato, a six-volume adventure series illustrated by Ángeles Ruiz and built around the seventeen UN Sustainable Development Goals. In August 2025 El País published her short story "La señora Matilde".

== Awards ==
In 2012 Miranda received the fourth Villa de La Almunia award for cinematographic arts, given by the town council of La Almunia de Doña Godina; she had spent part of her childhood in nearby Ricla, where her father worked as a doctor. The Miranda y Tato collection earned Miranda, Jorge Miranda and Nacho Rubio the children's and young adult literature prize at the 2021 Artes & Letras awards, presented by the newspaper Heraldo de Aragón. In 2023 the Festival de Cine de Comedia de Tarazona y el Moncayo gave her its Premio Talento Aragonés. In 2024 the Fundación Ortega-Marañón awarded her the Maruja Mallo Prize in the narrative category, at a ceremony where the other winners included the philosopher Victoria Camps and the sculptor Cristina Iglesias.

== Personal life ==
Miranda is married to the actor Nacho Rubio. Their two daughters have appeared in Amar es para siempre as the young children of her character.
