= Miguel Ferrando-Rocher =

Spanish theatre director

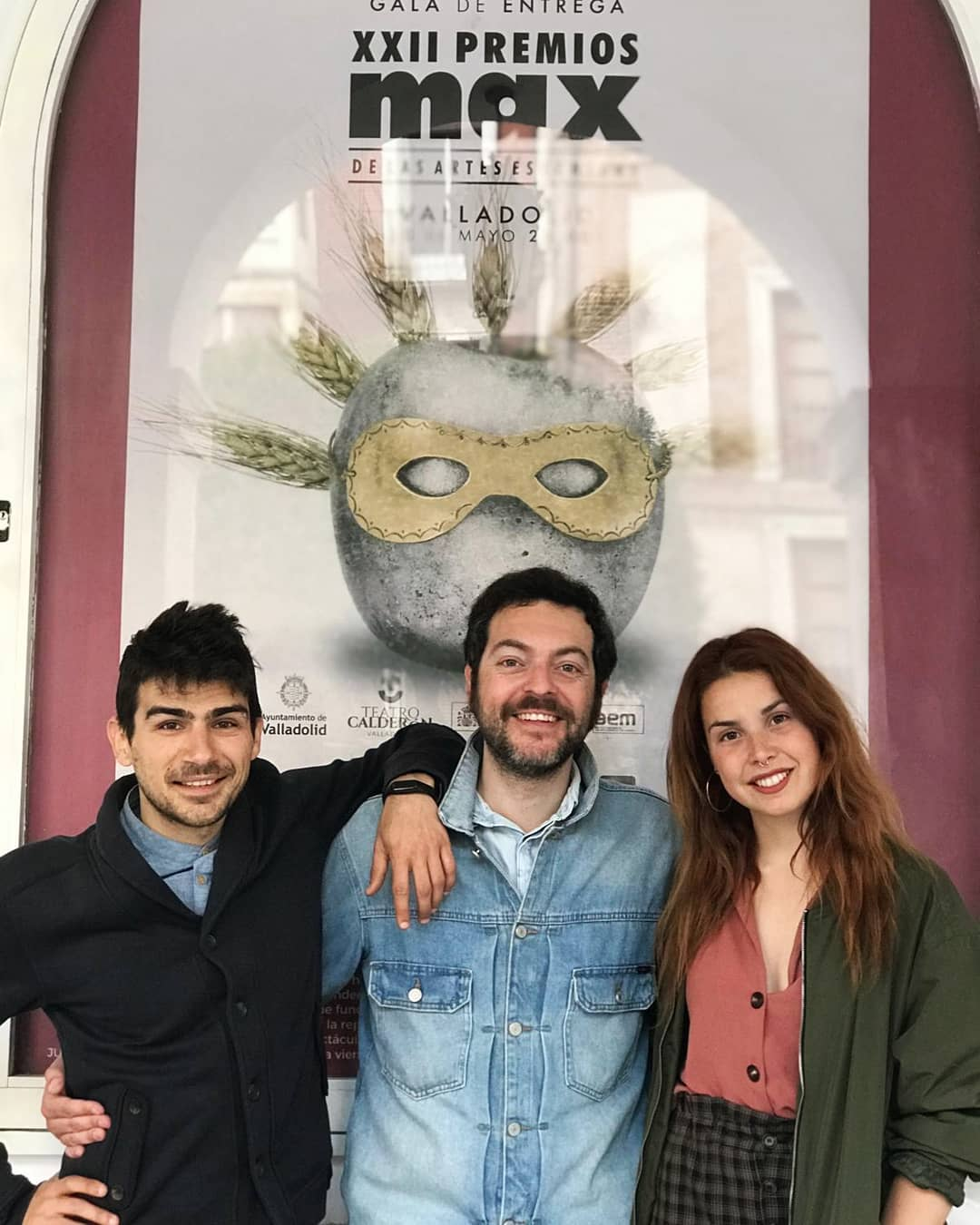
- Miguel Ferrando-Rocher at the MAX Awards 2019
- Occupation(s): Telecommunications engineer, university professor, theatre director
- Years active: 2000–present

Miguel Ferrando-Rocher (born 1985) is a Spanish telecommunications engineer, university professor, and theatre director. He was born in Alcoy, Spain.

He received a PhD in Telecommunication Engineering from the Universitat Politècnica de València and currently works as an Associate Professor of Signal Theory and Communications at the Polytechnic School of Gandia. He is President of IEEE Consultants Network of Spain since 2024.

In 2025, he was included in the global list of the world's most influential researchers compiled by Stanford University and Elsevier, ranking among the top 2% of scientists with the greatest international impact in their field.

He also holds a degree in Performing Arts from the Escola Superior d'Art Dramàtic de València, with a specialization in stage directing and playwriting. His final degree project was supervised by playwright Carles Alberola and included the participation of actress Paula Usero.

In 2013, Ferrando-Rocher founded the theatre company Groc Teatre, where he serves as artistic director. The company focuses on productions based on real-life events.

== Selected works ==
- Genovese (2017) – Recipient of the 2019 MAX Award for Best Audience Production.
- Tourmalet (2018) – Awarded at the 2019 Escènia Theatre Festival.
- Áurea (2019) – Selected for Graners de Creació (2019–2022), a Valencian arts residency program.
- El Inocente (2021)

== Awards and recognition ==
- MAX Award (2019), Audience Choice, for Genovese
- Escènia Festival Award (2019), for Tourmalet
- URSI Young Scientist Award (2017)
- AIRBUS Defence and Space Award for Best PhD Thesis on Active Antennas for Satellite Communications
- Extraordinary Doctorate Award, Universitat Politècnica de València
- Appointed Global Ambassador of the Young Professionals Program by the IEEE
