= Presunto culpable (TV series) =

Spanish television series

- Genre: Mystery; Thriller
- Created by: Javier Holgado; Josep Cister Rubio; Aitor Montánchez
- Screenplay by: Javier Holgado; Carlos Vila; Susana López Rubio
- Directed by: Alejandro Bazzano; Alberto Ruiz Rojo; Menna Fité
- Starring: Miguel Ángel Muñoz; Susi Sánchez; Elvira Mínguez; Alejandra Onieva
- Composer: Pascal Gaigne
- Country of origin: Spain
- Original languages: Spanish; Basque
- No. of seasons: 1
- No. of episodes: 13

Production
- Cinematography: Josu Inchaustegui
- Production companies: Atresmedia Televisión; Boomerang TV

Original release
- Network: Antena 3
- Release: 18 September – 11 December 2018

Presunto culpable is a Spanish mystery thriller television series starring Miguel Ángel Muñoz. Produced by Atresmedia Televisión in collaboration with Boomerang TV, it aired on Antena 3 in 2018.

== Premise ==
Mainly set in the Basque Country, the plot concerns the investigation on the disappearance and murder of the biologist Anne Otxoa (Alejandra Onieva), after which her boyfriend, working colleague and prime suspect Jon (Miguel Ángel Muñoz) flees from his hometown of Mundaka, settling in Paris. About 5 years after the murder, Jon returns to the town to put all the pieces together and find out the truth about what happened.

== Cast ==
- Miguel Ángel Muñoz as Jon Aristegui.
- Alejandra Onieva as Anne.
- Susi Sánchez as Begoña.
- Carlos Serrano as Iñaki.
- Elvira Mínguez as Amaia.
- Carol Rovira as Maite.
- Maialen Vega as Natalia.
- Teresa Hurado as Susana.
- Itziar Atienza as Ainhoa.
- Irene Montalà as Elena.
- Eduardo Rosa as Javier.
- Pablo Scola as Salvador.
- Tomás del Estal as Aitor.
- Josean Bengoetxea as Julen.
- Kiko Rossi as Eneko.
- Iñaki Font as Joseba.
- Asier Iturriaga as Guillermo.
- Íñigo Aranburu as Bernardo.
- Marta Castellote as Laia.
- Jon Mendía as Pedro.
- Patxi Santamaría as Padre Leandro.
- Naiara Carmona as Nerea.
- Mark Schardan as Peter.
- Daniela Rubio as Isabel.
- Jorge Andreu as Miguel.

== Production and release ==
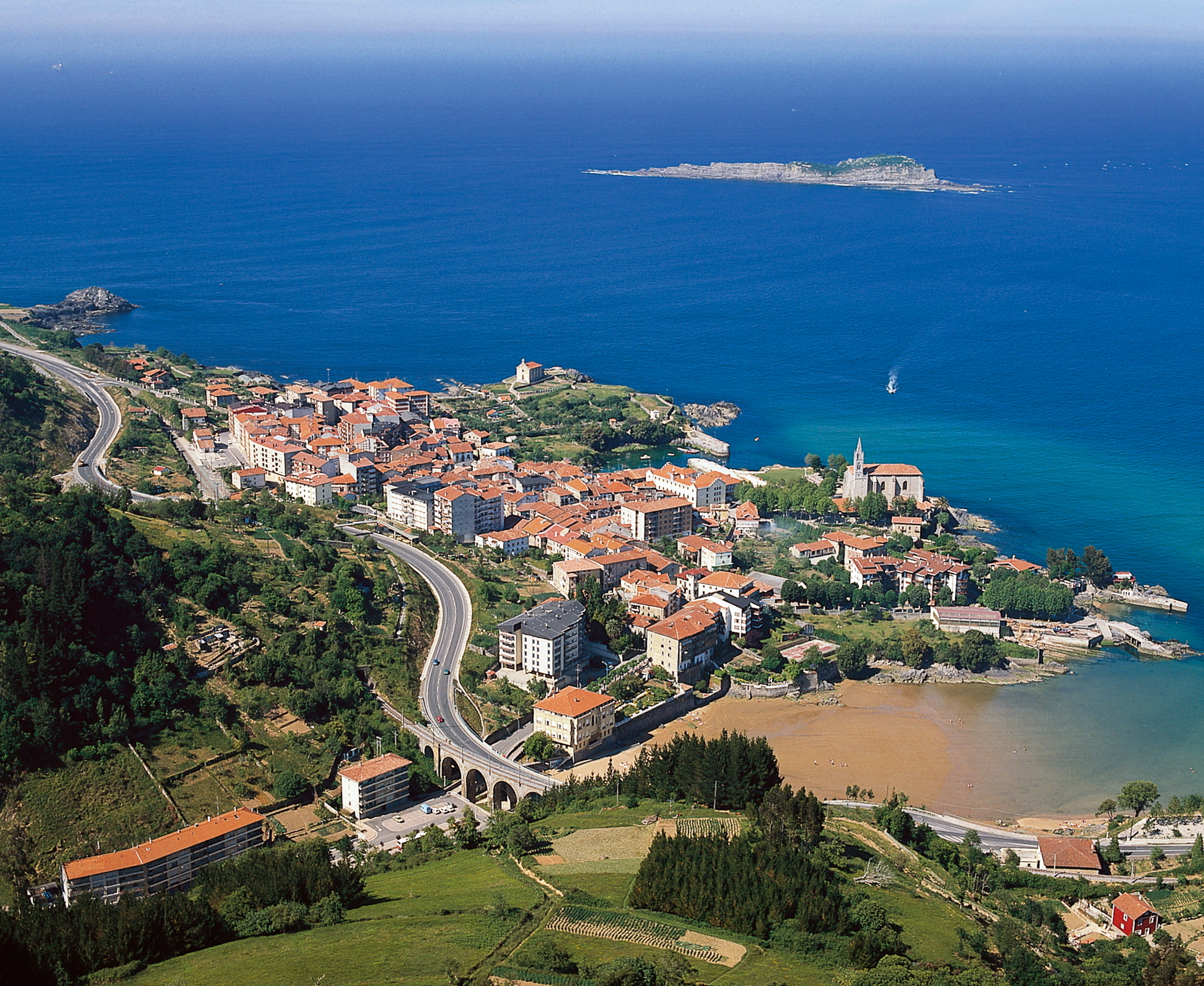
Production worked in Mundaka

Produced by Atresmedia Televisión in collaboration with Boomerang TV, Presunto Culpable was created by Javier Holgado, Josep Cister Rubio and Aitor Montánchez. The writing team was formed by Javier Holgado, Carlos Vila and Susana López Rubio whereas the episodes were directed by Alejandro Bazzano, Alberto Ruiz Rojo and Menna Fité. The cinematography was tasked to Josu Inchaustegui and Pascal Gaigne composed the score.

Filming took place on location in the Basque Country. Shooting locations included San Juan de Gaztelugatxe, the Ría of Gernika, Mundaka; the Cape of Matxitxako; Bermeo; Laga; Laida, Arribolas; Busturia; the Urdaibai Bird Center; Sukarrieta, Derio and streets of Bilbao. Conversely some scenes were shot in Paris, Madrid and Segovia. The 23-week-long shooting was wrapped up by April 2018.

The 13-episode series premiered on 18 September 2018 on Antena 3. The weekly broadcasting run ended on 11 December 2018, with the finale earning a 14.9% audience share.

Series	Episodes	Originally released			Ref.
Series	Episodes	First released	Last released	Network	Ref.
1	13	18 September 2018	11 December 2018	Antena 3	

No.	Title	Original release date
1	"Vértigo"	18 September 2018
2	"Culpabilidad"	25 September 2018
3	"Defensa"	2 October 2018
4	"Permiso"	9 October 2018
5	"Furia"	16 October 2018
6	"Dolor"	23 October 2018
7	"Pensamientos"	30 October 2018
8	"Rabia"	6 November 2018
9	"Persecución"	13 November 2018
10	"Disidencias"	20 November 2018
11	"Cambios"	27 November 2018
12	"Reproches"	4 December 2018
13	"Verdad"	11 December 2018

== Awards and nominations ==
Year	Award	Category	Nominee(s)	Result	Ref.
2018	6th MiM Series Awards	Best Drama Series		Nominated	
2018	6th MiM Series Awards	Best Drama Actor	Miguel Ángel Muñoz	Nominated	
2019	25th Shanghai Television Festival	Best Foreign TV Series		Won	
2019	21st Iris Awards	Best Fiction		Nominated	
2019	21st Iris Awards	Best Direction	Alejandro Bazzano, Alberto Ruiz Rojo & Menna Fité	Nominated	
2019	21st Iris Awards	Best Actress	Elvira Mínguez	Nominated	
