= Lobos de Arga =

- Directed by: Juan Martínez Moreno
- Screenplay by: Juan Martínez Moreno
- Produced by: Tomás Cimadevilla; Emma Lustres
- Starring: Gorka Otxoa; Carlos Areces; Secun de la Rosa; Manuel Manquiña; Mabel Rivera
- Cinematography: Carlos Ferro
- Music by: Sergio Moure
- Production company: Telespan 2000
- Distributed by: Vértice Cine
- Release date: July 13, 2012 (Spain)
- Country: Spain
- Language: Spanish

Lobos de Arga (released as Game of Werewolves in the United States and Attack of the Werewolves in the United Kingdom) is a 2012 Spanish comedy-horror film directed by Juan Martínez Moreno.

== Plot ==
In 1910, in Arga, a small village from Galicia, the Mariño family is cursed by a gypsy woman as punishment for the lustful excesses of the Marquise de Mariño. Upon reaching the age of ten, her son becomes a werewolf.

A hundred years later, Tomás, a struggling novelist and the last descendant of the Mariño family, returns to the village on invitation from its mayor to participate in a ceremony and to seek inspiration within his childhood home: a large and abandoned mansion. In his exploration of the village on the following days, he reunites with his childhood friend Calisto and with his uncle Evaristo, the latter of whom has been elected both the town's priest and mayor. Despite being touted as the guest of honor, Tomás feels concerned that he is virtually unknown among the locals. Further adding to his dismay is the sudden appearance of Mario, his shady publisher on the run from the law.

On the night of the ceremony, Tomás and Mario are brutally abducted by the villagers and taken to a reinforced barn on the village's outskirts. There, upon cryptic prophecies told by Evaristo, the both of them are dropped into a dark labyrinth beneath the village. In their search for a way out, they inadvertently awaken the werewolf of legend, who proceeds to give chase. Meanwhile, Calisto locates a secret way to the labyrinth and pulls Tomás and Mario out, leaving the werewolf behind.

The group takes shelter in Calisto's house. He explains that the village sought to end a century-old curse by feeding a descendant of the Mariño family, lest another greater curse take effect. Furthermore, the villagers have blocked the ways out of the town and disabled Tomás' car. Tomás attempts to call his grandmother for help, but his cellphone's reception is too poor for his pleas to go through, and the call drops after a short time.

Under suspicion from the village and in light of gruesome deaths having happened the night before, Calisto is sent down into the labyrinth to kill the werewolf as the curse is presumed to have remained in effect. Instead, he finds a young boy, whom he covertly takes into his home. Hoping to end the curse, he and Mario feed one of Tomás fingers to the presumed wolf-child.

The group wanders out at sundown to escape the village on foot but are caught by Evaristo and his mob. As the confrontation escalates, the sun sets and the second curse takes effect, transforming all the villagers into werewolves - except for Calisto whom despite being a local, was actually born outside of the village. Tomás' grandmother, Rosa (Mabel Rivera), arrives at the same moment, taking the group into her car and escaping to the family mansion.

Meanwhile, two policemen arrive into the village upon a tip from Rosa, suspicious after Tomás' earlier call. While one panics and runs to his death, the other (Luis Zahera) escapes by shooting himself in the head.

Tomás and the group are forced to leave the mansion after the werewolves invade it, but are rescued by the policeman revealed to have faked his suicide by letting the bullet only graze his scalp. Retreating to the village's church, they fend off another werewolf attack at the cost of Rosa's death, narrowly escaping into the underground labyrinths before destroying the church and most of the werewolves with a stack of dynamite. As they take their distance from the village center, the child's age briskly catches up with him, and he dies after turning into an old man before Tomás' eyes.

The church's explosion and Luis' lack of radio response have attracted the police's attention, and rescue teams arrive at daybreak to find the mass of dead werewolves. Suspicious that Calisto and Mario might have been bitten by the werewolves and infected, Tomás chains them to a piece of furniture in his home and stands guard with a shotgun in case they turn. Unexpectedly, however, Tomás transforms, and the film ends as he prepares to take revenge on the two for his missing fingers.

== Cast ==
- Gorka Otxoa as Tomás Mariño
- Carlos Areces as Calisto
- Secun de la Rosa as Mario
- Manuel Manquiña as Evaristo
- Luis Zahera as Guardia Civil Officer
- Mabel Rivera as Rosa
