= Don't Be Afraid (film) =

- Film poster
- Spanish: No tengas miedo
- Directed by: Montxo Armendáriz
- Screenplay by: Montxo Armendáriz
- Story by: María Laura Gargarella; Montxo Armendáriz
- Starring: Lluís Homar; Michelle Jenner; Belén Rueda; Nuria Gago; Cristina Plazas; Rubén Ochandiano; Javier Pereira
- Cinematography: Alex Catalán
- Edited by: Fernando Franco
- Release date: 29 April 2011
- Running time: 90 minutes
- Country: Spain
- Language: Spanish

Don't Be Afraid (Spanish: No tengas miedo) is a 2011 Spanish drama film directed by Montxo Armendáriz based on an original story by María Laura Gargarella and Armendáriz. It stars Michelle Jenner as Silvia, a young woman traumatized by sexual abuse as a child.

== Cast ==
- Michelle Jenner as Silvia
- Lluís Homar as padre de Silvia
- Belén Rueda as madre de Silvia
- Nuria Gago as Maite
- Cristina Plazas as psicóloga
- Rubén Ochandiano as Toni
- Javier Pereira as Víctor

== See also ==
- List of Spanish films of 2011
