= Love at First Kiss =

2023 Spanish romantic comedy film

- Netflix official poster
- Spanish: Eres tú
- Directed by: Alauda Ruiz de Azúa
- Screenplay by: Cristóbal Garrido; Adolfo Valor
- Produced by: Antonio Asensio; Paloma Molina
- Starring: Álvaro Cervantes; Silvia Alonso; Susana Abaitua, Gorka Otxoa
- Cinematography: Sergi Gallardo
- Music by: Ivan Palomares
- Production company: Zeta Studios
- Distributed by: Netflix
- Release date: 3 March 2023
- Running time: 96 minutes
- Country: Spain
- Language: Spanish

Love at First Kiss (Spanish: Eres tú, lit. 'It's you') is a 2023 Spanish romantic comedy film directed by Alauda Ruiz de Azúa and written by Cristóbal Garrido and Adolfo Valor. It stars Álvaro Cervantes, Silvia Alonso, Susana Abaitua and Gorka Otxoa. The film follows Javier who, at the age of 16, kissing a girl for the first time, realised that he had a gift of romantic clairvoyance.

The film became available for streaming on Netflix on 3 March 2023.

== Cast ==
- Álvaro Cervantes as Javier
- Silvia Alonso as Lucía
- Susana Abaitua as Ariana
- Gorka Otxoa as Roberto
- Pilar Castro as Sonsoles
- Elisabeth Larena
- Ninton Sánchez
- Paula Muñoz
- Fabia Castro
- Lara Oliete
- Mauro Muñiz De Urquiza
- Adrián Fernández Sánchez

== Production ==
In April 2021, Netflix announced that they will produce romantic comedy film Eres tú with Zeta Studios.

The film was wrapped up in April 2022.

== Release ==
As per announcement of 3 February, the film premiered on Netflix on 3 March 2023.

== Reception ==
Anne Campbell rated the film 3 stars out of 5 and called it a "A slow rom-com but not without some unique charms." Criticising the pace and lack of comedy Campbell closed her review as: "Love at First Kiss is unique enough to keep watching despite the limited comedy and pacing problems." Janire Zurbano rated the film 3.5 stars out of 5 for 20 Minutes Cinema and opined that film has neglected fantasy. Concluding, Zurbano deemed it as a, "Classic 'Rom-com' that confirms Álvaro Cervantes as Netflix's Hugh Grant. Kirsten Hawkes reviewing for Parent Previews graded the film as C and criticised the length of the film. Concluding, Hawkes wrote, that she was not impressed albeit the plot is sufficiently novel that it kept her focused, but to her the "biggest weakness" was that, it moved in some unexpected directions but telegraphed those changes a bit too far in advance."
