= Luimelia =

Television series

#Luimelia
- Genre: Romance
- Created by: Camino Sánchez; Borja González Santaolalla; Diana Rojo
- Directed by: Borja González Santaolalla
- Starring: Paula Usero; Carol Rovira
- Country of origin: Spain
- Original language: Spanish
- No. of seasons: 4
- No. of episodes: 26

Production
- Executive producers: Montse García; Francisco Sierra; Lucía Alonso-Allende; Ignacio García Alonso
- Running time: c. 10 min (S. 1–3); c. 30 min (S. 4)
- Production companies: Atresmedia TV; Diagonal TV

Original release
- Network: Atresplayer Premium
- Release: 14 February 2020

Related
- Amar es para siempre

#Luimelia is a Spanish lesbian romance television series starring Paula Usero and Carol Rovira. It began airing on Atresplayer Premium on 14 February 2020.

== Premise ==
#Luimelia is a spin-off of the period serial drama Amar es para siempre. It rescues two iconic characters, the lesbian couple formed by Luisita and Amelia, and transfers them forward from the late 1970s to current day, while being played by the same actresses. The project was driven by the strong momentum of fandom's shipping behind the two characters in the period drama series.

== Cast ==
=== Starring ===
- Paula Usero as Luisita Gómez.
- Carol Rovira as Amelia Ledesma.

=== Other ===
- Lucía Martín Abello as María.
- Jonás Berami as Ignacio.
- Lena Fernández as Maruxa.
- Laura Sánchez as Pepa.
- Luz Valdenebro as Lucía.
- Lucía Jiménez as Aurelia.
- Roi Méndez as Sergi
- Francesco Carril
- Ariana Martínez
- Javier Botet

== Production and release ==
#Luimelia is based on an original idea by Camino Sánchez, Borja González Santaolalla and Diana Rojo. Produced by Atresmedia and Diagonal TV, the filming of the series began in Madrid by November 2019. Montse García, Francisco Sierra, Lucía Alonso-Allende and Ignacio García Alonso were credited as executive producers and Borja González Santaolalla as director. The first season premiered on Atresplayer Premium on 14 February 2020. The second season began airing on 16 August 2020, whereas the third season began airing on 17 January 2021. Consisting of 8 episodes, season 4 features an extended running time of around 30 minutes per episode. Its premiere date is slated for 25 July 2021.

Series	Episodes	Originally released			Ref.
Series	Episodes	First released	Last released	Network	Ref.
1	6	14 February 2020	15 March 2020	Atresplayer Premium	
2	6	16 August 2020	20 September 2020	Atresplayer Premium	
3	6	17 January 2021	21 February 2021	Atresplayer Premium	
4	8	25 July 2021	12 September 2021	Atresplayer Premium	

=== Season 1 ===
No. overall	No. in season	Title	Original release date
1	1	"Luisita y Amelia"	14 February 2020
2	2	"Primera Cita"	16 February 2020
3	3	"#Lurelia"	23 February 2020
4	4	"Nosotres"	1 March 2020
5	5	"Ana, Sergi y el Rey León"	8 January 2020
6	6	"Naranjas"	15 March 2020

=== Season 2 ===
No. overall	No. in season	Title	Original release date
7	1	"Luisita y Amelia 2"	16 August 2020
8	2	"Improesía"	23 August 2020
9	3	"#BoicotLurelia"	30 August 2020
10	4	"Kamchatka"	6 September 2020
11	5	"Madrid"	13 September 2020
12	6	"Algo pasa con Mary"	20 September 2020

=== Season 3 ===
No. overall	No. in season	Title	Original release date
13	1	"La vecina indiscreta"	17 January 2021
14	2	"Sarajebo"	24 January 2021
15	3	"El tercero de la tercera"	31 January 2021
16	4	"Yo nunca"	7 February 2021
17	5	"Ventanas"	14 February 2021
18	6	"Ukelele y guitarra"	21 February 2021

=== Season 4 ===
No. overall	No. in season	Title	Original release date
19	1	"La teoría del caos"	25 July 2021
20	2	"Adiós Federico"	1 August 2021
21	3	"La maniobra Hogan"	8 August 2021
22	4	"La gran conjunción"	15 August 2021
23	5	"Hasta luego, Mari Carmen"	22 August 2021
24	6	"Asteroide Z"	29 August 2021
25	7	"Principio de incertidumbre"	5 September 2021
26	8	"Multiverso"	12 September 2021

== Awards and nominations ==
Year	Award	Category	Nominee(s)	Result	Ref.
2020	4th PRODU Awards	Best Short Series		Won	
2021	32nd GLAAD Media Awards	Outstanding Spanish-Language Scripted Television Series		Nominated	
2022	33rd GLAAD Media Awards	Outstanding Spanish-Language Scripted Television Series		Nominated	
