= Andrés Velencoso =

Spanish model and actor

Andres Velencoso
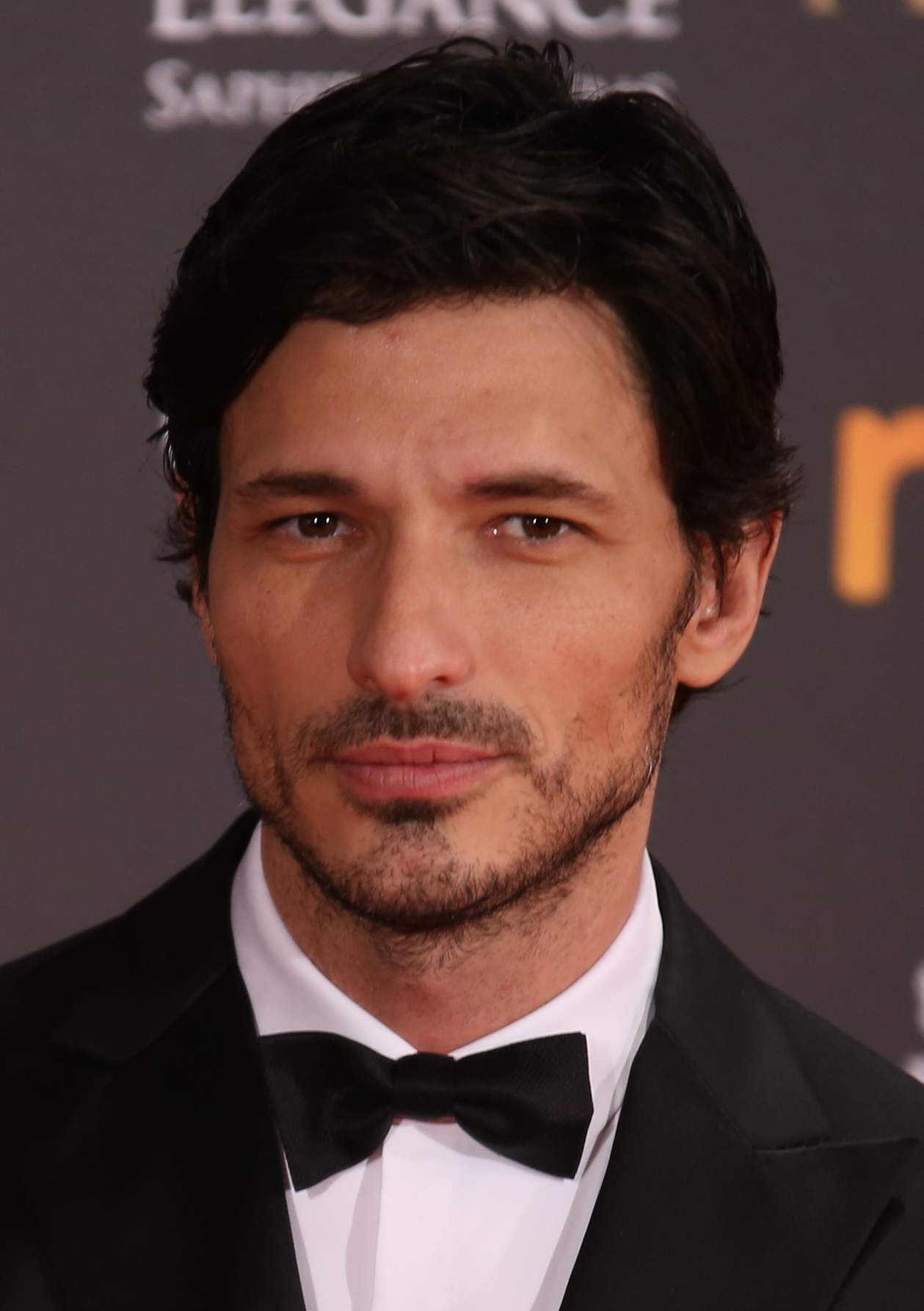
- Velencoso at the 31st Goya Awards in 2017
- Born: Andrés Velencoso Segura; 11 March 1978 (age 48); Ledaña, Cuenca, Spain
- Occupations: Model, actor
- Modeling information
- Height: 6 ft 2 in (1.88 m)
- Hair color: Brown
- Eye color: Brown
- Agency: IMG Models (New York, London); Next Model Management (Paris); I LOVE Models Management (Milan); Sight Management Studio (Barcelona); 2pm Model Management (Copenhagen); Kult Model Agency (Hamburg, Surry Hills); Wilhelmina Models (Los Angeles); Way Model Management (Sao Paulo); Le Management (Stockholm); Donna Models (Tokyo); Elite Model Management (Toronto)

Andrés Velencoso Segura (born 11 March 1978) is a Spanish model and actor. He is best known for ad campaigns such as Chanel Allure Homme, sport fragrance and Louis Vuitton campaign with Jennifer Lopez in 2003.

In June 2009, he was ranked #6 in MODELS.com's "Top Icons Men", alongside male models Mathias Lauridsen, Tyson Ballou and Mark Vanderloo. and currently he ranks No.16 on Top 25 list "The Money Guys" following his compatriots Oriol Elcacho and Jon Kortajarena.

== Early life ==
Andrés Velencoso was born in the Spanish municipality of Ledaña (Cuenca). At the age of 15, he moved to Tossa de Mar (Girona).

== Career ==
=== Modeling ===
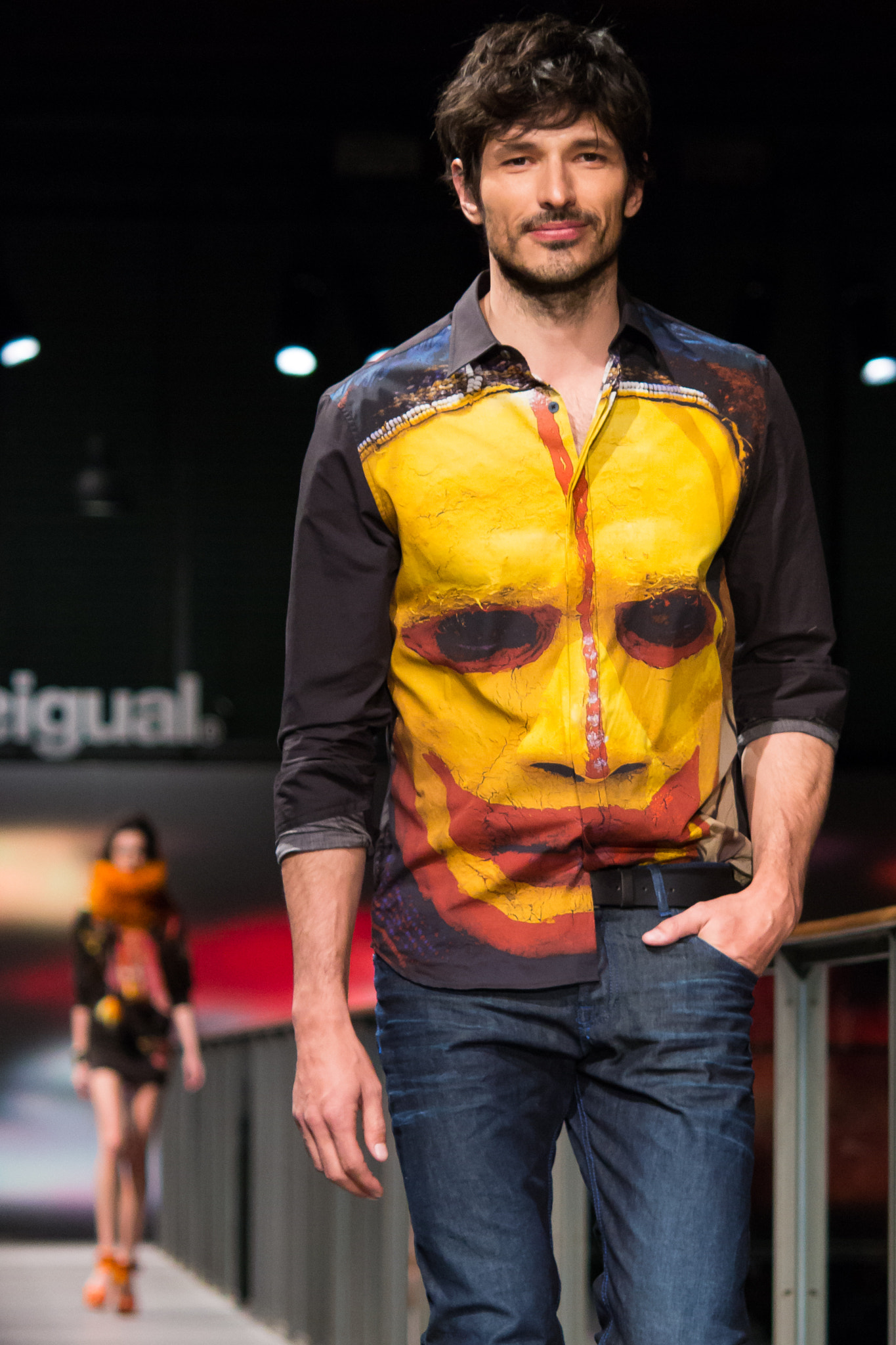
Valencoso at the 080 Barcelona fashion week in 2014.

Velencoso started his modelling career after he finished high school, signing a contract with Group Model Management, a Spanish modelling agency. However, the beginning of his career was filled with rejection. When Velencoso went to Milan, almost every agent found him unusable. His fortunes changed when Natalie Kates, an agent from New York City-based Q Model Management opened the door for him in 2001, despite his inability to speak English. Kates started him off fresh with four new polaroids in his book and sent him to meet people. One of them was photographer Matt Albiani, who loved Andres for an editorial that he was working on.

The next day Andres found himself on the set of a shoot in East Hampton, New York. After just a few days in the city, he caught the eyes of some of the industry's most famous photographers, including Michael Thompson and Francois Nars. In 2002, he booked the Banana Republic spring ad campaign and a year later starred in the Louis Vuitton ad campaign, alongside Jennifer Lopez. He signed a fragrance contract with Chanel Allure Homme Sport and became the face of Loewe in 2004. Landed his first magazine cover for Arena Homme + for the winter 2005 edition and appeared in the Jean Paul Gaultier ad campaign, with Gisele Bündchen and Diana Dondoe.

Velencoso has been on the covers of many top fashion magazines including L'Officiel Hommes, Hercules, Arena Homme +, and international editions of Elle, Vanity Fair and L'Officiel Hommes. Since his debut, he has been the face of many advertising campaigns including Banana Republic, Louis Vuitton, H&M, Trussardi, Chanel, Ermenegildo Zegna, Loewe, Jean Paul Gaultier, Elie Tahari and Etro. Apart from Thompson and Nars, he has worked with photographers such as Terry Richardson, Karl Lagerfeld, Inez van Lamsweerde and Vinoodh Matadin.

He is signed with IMG Models in New York City, MGM in Paris, 2pm Model Management in Copenhagen, I LOVE Models in Milan and Donna Models in Tokyo. He was featured in Kylie Minogue's new fragrance 'Inverse' in the official print campaign and TV ad. Velencoso received the 'Tossenc D'Honor' award in his home town Tossa de Mar on 14 May 2010.

=== Acting ===
Alongside his modelling work, Velencoso is also an actor, having appeared in films including Summer Camp and appeared as Rubén Barahona in the Spanish television series B&b, de boca en boca. In 2017, it was announced that he would be starring in Edha, the first Netflix Original drama to be produced in Argentina, directed by Daniel Burman. In 2017 he also played Omar in Velvet Colección. As of 2021 he plays Armando in Elite season 4. Then he appears in two episodes of season 5. In 2022 he appeared in A Private Affair.

== Personal life ==
Velencoso dated singer Kylie Minogue from 2008 to 2013. From 2013 to 2015, he was in a relationship with Spanish actress Úrsula Corberó. English is his fifth language, after Spanish, Catalan, French, and Italian.
