= November (2003 film) =

- Theatrical release poster
- Spanish: Noviembre
- Directed by: Achero Mañas
- Screenplay by: Achero Mañas; Federico Mañas
- Produced by: José Antonio Félez
- Starring: Óscar Jaenada; Ingrid Rubio; Juan Díaz; Adriana Domínguez; Javier Ríos; Nuria Gago; Juanma Rodríguez; Jordi Padrosa
- Cinematography: Juan Carlos Gómez
- Edited by: Nacho Ruiz Capillas
- Music by: Eduardo Arbide
- Release dates: 7 September 2003 (Toronto); 26 September 2003 (Spain)
- Running time: 104 minutes
- Country: Spain
- Language: Spanish

November (Spanish: Noviembre) is a 2003 Spanish film directed by Achero Mañas, who also co-wrote the screenplay. Its cast features Óscar Jaenada, Ingrid Rubio, Juan Díaz, Adriana Domínguez, Javier Ríos, Nuria Gago, Juanma Rodríguez, and Jordi Padrosa.

Set from 1997 to 2040, against the backdrop of the plight of a street theatre troupe, the plot explores the relationship between spectators and performers, the commercialization of art, and the revolutionary potential of theatre.

== Plot ==
Impelled by a spirit which still preserves a patina of idealism, Alfredo arrives in Madrid intent on creating "a performance which is more free, straight from the heart, capable of making people feel alive". His concept of what theater should be begins beyond the stage, out in the streets face to face with the public.

Outdoors, in any town square, in a park or in the city's most commercial street, Alfredo and his troupe NOVEMBER start the show: demons to provoke passers-by, displays of social conscience, actions taken to the extreme to put the forces of law and order on full alert. There are no limits, no censorship; only ideas which are always valid so long as the public ceases to be the public and becomes part of the show swept by surprise, fear, tears or laughter.

== Cast ==
- Óscar Jaenada as Alfredo
- Ingrid Rubio as Lucía
- Javier Ríos as Juan
- Juan Díaz as Daniel
- Adriana Domínguez as Alicia
- Jordi Padrosa as Imanol
- Núria Gago as Helena
- Juanma Rodríguez as Pedro
- Héctor Alterio as Yuta
- Paloma Lorena as Lucía
- Ángel Facio as Juan
- Juan Margallo as Daniel
- Amparo Valle as Alicia
- Fernando Conde is Imanol
- Amparo Baró as Helena
- Juan Díaz as Daniel
- Juan Diego as Pedro

== Reception ==
November screened at the 28th Toronto International Film Festival in September 2003. It was released theatrically in Spain on 26 September 2003.

== Reception ==
Jacob Neiiendam of ScreenDaily deemed November to be a "well-acted and great looking film" yet also ultimately failing "to make its story and characters engaging.

== Accolades ==
Year	Award	Category	Nominee(s)	Result	Ref.
2003	2003 Toronto International Film Festival	FIPRESCI International Critics' Award		Won	
2004	18th Goya Awards	Best New Actor	Óscar Jaenada	Nominated	
2004	18th Goya Awards	Best Costume Design	Nereida Bonmati	Nominated	
2004	18th Goya Awards	Best Makeup and Hairstyles	Karmele Soler, Francisco Rodríguez	Nominated	

== See also ==
- List of Spanish films of 2003
