= Amar es para siempre =

Spanish television series (2013–2024)

- Genre: Soap opera; Period drama
- Country of origin: Spain
- Original language: Spanish
- No. of seasons: 12
- No. of episodes: 2,829

Production
- Running time: 45 minutes
- Production companies: Diagonal TV; Atresmedia Televisión

Original release
- Network: Antena 3
- Release: 14 January 2013 – 6 March 2024

Related
- Amar en tiempos revueltos; #Luimelia

Amar es para siempre (lit. 'To Love is Forever') is a long-running Spanish television period soap opera that originally ran on Antena 3 for twelve seasons, from 14 January 2013 to 6 March 2024, with the plot taking place between October 1960 and September 1984. It is the resumption of Televisión Española's Amar en tiempos revueltos.

== Premise ==
Amar es para siempre is a period drama that resumes the previous series Amar en tiempos revueltos and is set around the fictional Plaza de los Frutos in Madrid. Several cast members from Amar en tiempos revueltos resumed their characters in the first season of Amar es para siempre. Only four cast members appear in all seasons of both series: Manu Baqueiro as Marcelino, Itziar Miranda as Manolita, José Antonio Sayagués as Pelayo, and Sebastián Fernández as Sebas.

The story is initially set in 1960. The eighth season is set in 1977. The final episodes are set in 1983.

== Production and release ==
Amar es para siempre is produced by Atresmedia Televisión in collaboration with Diagonal TV. It began airing on 14 January 2013 on Antena 3. It reached the 2,000 episode mark on 1 December 2020, during its ninth season.

It has sparked two spinoffs, #Luimelia and Luimelia 77, both revolving around the love story between Amelia and Luisita.

== Episodes ==
Season	Episodes	Originally released		Avg. viewers (millions)	Avg. share	Setting	R.
Season	Episodes	First released	Last released	Avg. viewers (millions)	Avg. share	Setting	R.
1	165	14 January 2013	4 September 2013	1.640	13.4%	October 1960 – June 1961	
2	256	5 September 2013	9 September 2014	1.673	14.1%	September 1961 – March 1963	
3	256	10 September 2014	3 September 2015	1.712	14.7%	July 1963 – May 1964	-
4	254	4 September 2015	5 September 2016	1.534	13.4%	September 1964 - June 1965	-
5	256	6 September 2016	11 September 2017	1.388	12.4%	September 1967 – July 1968	-
6	256	12 September 2017	18 September 2018	1.385	12.1%	September 1969 – September 1970	-
7	250	19 September 2018	13 September 2019	1.348	12.2%	September 1975 – July 1976	-
8	253	16 September 2019	15 September 2020	1.247	10.8%	September 1976 – September 1977	-
9	251	16 September 2020	9 September 2021	1.246	11.3%	September 1978 – September 1979	-
10	254	10 September 2021	9 September 2022	1.185	12.2%	September 1980 – August 1981	-
11	223	12 September 2022	25 July 2023	1.042	11.1%	September 1981 – August 1982	-
12	155	26 July 2023	6 March 2024	1.102	11.5%	August 1982 – September 1984	-

== Seasons ==
=== Season 1 ===
Season 1 premiered on 14 January 2013 and ended on 4 September 2013 and consisted of 165 episodes. The principal love story was between Inés Saavedra and Mauro Jiménez.

Main cast: Manu Baqueiro, Itziar Miranda, José Antonio Sayagües, Maica Barroso, Nadia de Santiago, Javier Collado, Bárbara Goenaga, Marc Clotet, Josep Linuesa, Mónica Estarreado, Aitor Mazo, Rosana Pastor, Josep Julien, Chusa Barbero, Rocío Muñoz, Carmen Conesa, Juan Messeguer, Enrique Berrendero, Anna Barrachina, Ledicia Sola, Elena Furiase, Jaime Puyol, Jaume Ulled, Patxi Freytez, Raquel Infante, Carlos García, Sara Casasnovas, Federico Aguado, Ángela Cremonte, Alfonso Bassave, Asier Etxeandía, Antonio Garrido, Belén López.

=== Season 2 ===
Season 2 premiered on 5 September 2013 and ended on 9 September 2014, consisting of 256 episodes. The principal love story was between Valeria Prado and Diego Tudela.

Main cast: Manuel Baqueiro, Itziar Miranda, José Antonio Sayagües, Nadia de Santiago, Javier Collado, Raquel Infante, Federico Aguado, Ángela Cremonte, Alfonso Bassave, Asier Etxeandía, Antonio Garrido, Belén López, Octavi Pujades, Alicia Sanz, Marian Arahuetes, Jordi Rebellón, Jaime Blanch, María Morales, Silvia Alonso, Anna Castillo, Elena Jiménez, Anna Barrachina, Secun de la Rosa.

=== Season 3 ===
Season 3 premiered on 10 September 2014 and ended on 3 September 2015, consisting of 251 episodes. The principal love story was between Laura Blasco and Jorge Arteche.

Main cast: Manuel Baqueiro, Itziar Miranda, José Antonio Sayagües, Nadia de Santiago, Javier Collado, Federico Aguado, Anna Castillo, Sara Rivero, Juanjo Artero, Ana Milán, Daniel Freire, Javier Hernández, Ferrán Vilajosana, Roger Coma, Fernando Vaquero, Nuria Gago, Chiqui Fernández, Luis Bermejo, Andrea Duro, Miriam Montilla, Álex Martínez, Carolina Lapausa, Laura Domínguez, Pedro Casablanc, Anabel Alonso, Pepón Nieto, Xenia Tostado, Óscar Ladoire, Álex Barahona, Nani Jiménez, Daniel Albaladejo, Alejandro Albarracín, Natalia Rodríguez, Jesús Olmedo.

=== Season 4 ===
Season 4 premiered on 4 September 2015 and ended on 5 September 2016, consisting of 254 episodes. The principal love story was between Adela Vázquez and Tomás Contreras.

Main cast: Manuel Baqueiro, Itziar Miranda, José Antonio Sayagües, Anabel Alonso, Alejandro Albarracín, Natalia Rodríguez, Elia Galera, Armando del Río, Juanma Lara, Ana Polvorosa, Toni Cantó, Michelle Calvó, Junio Valverde, Eva Marciel, Javier Mora, Víctor Sevilla, Lucía Martín Abello, Álvaro Monje, Bárbara Mestanza, Lola Herrera, Jorge Sanz, Juanjo Artero, Ana Fernández, Álex Barahona, Nuria Gago.

=== Season 5 ===
Season 5 premiered on 6 September 2016 and ended on 11 September 2017, consisting of 256 episodes. The principal love story was between Nuria Salgado and Jaime Novoa.

Main cast: Manuel Baqueiro, Itziar Miranda, José Antonio Sayagües, Anabel Alonso, Lucía Martín Abello, Mariona Ribas, Nancho Novo, Thaïs Blume, Javier Pereira, Miguel Ángel Muñoz, Mariam Hernández, Katia Klein, Gonzalo Kindelán, Gorka Lasaosa, Arturo Querejeta, Óscar Ortuño, Blanca Parés, Iñaki Miramón, Ana Torrent, María José Goyanes, Antonio Molero.

=== Season 6 ===
Season 6 premiered on 12 September 2017 and ended on 18 September 2018, consisting of 256 episodes. The principal love story was between Marta Novoa and Diego Durán.

Main cast: Manuel Baqueiro, Itziar Miranda, José Antonio Sayagües, Anabel Alonso, Lucía Martín Abello, Mariona Ribas, Iñaki Miramón, Antonio Molero, Fernando Cayo, Sonia Almarcha, Víctor Clavijo, Olivia Molina, Meritxell Calvo, Guillermo Barrientos, Ruth Núñez, Jonás Berami, Jacobo Dicenta, José Luis Torrijo, Sebastián Fernández, Jorge Usón, María Barranco, María Adánez.

=== Season 7 ===
Season 7 premiered on 19 September 2018 and ended on 13 September 2019, consisting of 250 episodes. The protagonist for the season was Ana López.

Main cast: Manuel Baqueiro, Itziar Miranda, José Antonio Sayagües, Anabel Alonso, Lucía Martín Abello, Iñaki Miramón, Jonás Berami, Sebastián Fernández, María Castro, Fernando Andina, Francisco Ortiz, Anna Azcona, Miguel Hermoso, Robert González, David Castillo, Natalia Huarte, Angy Fernández, Carol Rovira, Cristina Alcázar, Paula Usero, Lucía de la Fuente, Críspulo Cabezas, Fernando Albizu.

=== Season 8 ===
Season 8 premiered on 16 September 2019 and ended on 2020, consisting of 96 episodes. The principal love story was between Julia Eguía and Guillermo Galán.

Main cast: Manuel Baqueiro, Itziar Miranda, José Antonio Sayagües, Anabel Alonso, Iñaki Miramón, Carol Rovira, Paula Usero, Adriana Torrebejano, David Janer, José Manuel Seda, Lucía Jiménez, Beatriz Argüello, Llorenc González, Alba Gutiérrez, Luz Valdenebro, Marina Orta, Álvaro de Juana, Raúl Ferrando, Juan de Vera, Fede Celada, Sara Moraleda, Toni Misó, Adriá Collado.

== Awards and nominations ==
Year	Award	Category	Nominee(s)	Result	Ref.
2019	7th MiM Series Awards	Best Daily Series		Nominated	
2021	8th MiM Series Awards	Best Daily Series		Nominated	
