= A Private Affair (TV series) =

Spanish TV series

- Spanish: Un asunto privado
- Genre: Period drama; Mystery
- Created by: Teresa Fernández-Valdés; Ramón Campos; Gema R. Neira
- Directed by: David Pinillos; Maria Ripoll; Daniel Aranyó
- Creative director: Teresa Fernández-Valdés
- Starring: Aura Garrido; Angela Molina; Jean Reno; Álex García; Gorka Otxoa; Tito Valverde
- Country of origin: Spain
- Original language: Spanish
- No. of seasons: 1
- No. of episodes: 8

Production
- Executive producers: Ramón Campos; Gema R. Neira
- Producers: Amazon Prime; Bambú Producciones
- Production location: Spain

Original release
- Network: Amazon Prime
- Release: 23 September 2022

A Private Affair (Spanish: Un asunto privado) is a Spanish period drama television series from Bambú Producciones with Teresa Fernández-Valdés as showrunner. Set in Galicia in the late 1940s, it is an eight-part murder mystery comedy drama starring Aura Garrido and Jean Reno. The series was released on Amazon Prime on 23 September 2022.

== Synopsis ==
Frustrated by the lack of opportunities for women in a police department, Marina Quiroga, the sister of police commissioner Arturo Quiroga, witnesses a murder and sets out to investigate it on her own with the help of her loyal butler, Héctor Hugo.

== Cast ==
- Aura Garrido as Marina
- Jean Reno as Hector
- Ángela Molina as Doña Asunción
- Álex García as Andrés
- Gorka Otxoa as Pablo
- Tito Valverde as Ramírez
- Andrés Velencoso
- Pablo Molinero as Arturo
- Sara Sanz
- Carlos Villarino
- Toño Casais
- Nerea Portela
- Adrián Ríos

== Production ==
The series was filmed in 2020 and 2021 around Vigo, Pontevedra, Lérez, and other locations in the Rías Baixas. Initial plans to film in Madrid and Bilbao were abandoned due to the COVID-19 pandemic. In November 2020, it was announced that joining Reno and Garrido in the cast would be Ángela Molina, Álex García, Gorka Otxoa, Tito Valverde, Andrés Velencoso, Pablo Molinero, Sara Sanz, Carlos Villarino, Toño Casais, Nerea Portela and Adrián Ríos.

== Release ==
The series was released on Amazon Prime on 23 September 2022.

== Reception ==
In The New European Eleanor Longman-Rodd reviewed the series and called it "charming" and "a breath of fresh air". and remarked upon how "it makes use of familiar detective procedural conventions” but that "this is not your typical detective drama" and the series "adds a welcome dash of campery and colour" to a genre that can often be morbid.

Pat Stacey for the Irish Independent praised the performance of an "excellent" Jean Reno and described "stylish period trappings" which are "about as far removed from what we expect from the genre as it’s possible to get".
