= Amar en tiempos revueltos =

- Genre: Soap opera; Period drama
- Starring: Manu Baqueiro; Itziar Miranda; José Antonio Sayagués
- Country of origin: Spain
- Original language: Spanish
- No. of seasons: 7
- No. of episodes: 1707 episodes, 8 special episodes, 1 recap episode

Production
- Running time: 60 minutes
- Production company: Diagonal TV for RTVE

Original release
- Network: La 1
- Release: 27 September 2005 – 16 November 2012

Related
- Amar es para siempre

Amar en tiempos revueltos (Spanish for "Love in Troubled Times", or, more literally, "Loving during Turbulent Times"), is a Spanish television period soap opera that originally ran on La 1 of Televisión Española for seven seasons, from 27 September 2005 to 16 November 2012, set in the times of the Spanish civil war and Francoist Spain.

It run for 1,707 episodes, 8 special episodes and 1 recap episode. The series won prizes in Spain and a silver medal in the New York Festival. Following disagreements of the producing company Diagonal TV with Radiotelevisión Española, the fiction was relaunched in January 2013 on Antena 3 as Amar es para siempre.

== Seasons ==
=== 1936–1945 Season 1 ===
Started: 26 September 2005

Ended: 26 June 2006

Episodes: 199

Main love story: Andrea Robles (Ana Turpin) & Antonio Ramírez (Rodolfo Sancho)

Main cast: Ana Turpin, Rodolfo Sancho, Ágata Lys, Pilar Bardem, Héctor Colomé, Luisa Gavasa, Cristóbal Suárez, Félix Gómez, Ana Otero, Pilar Barrera, José Conde, and Francisco Algora.

=== 1945–1948 Season 2 ===
Started: 11 September 2006

Ended: 3 September 2007

Episodes: 221

Based on the years

Main love story: Elisa Domínguez (Inma Cuesta) & Marcos de la Cruz (Manu Fullola)

Main cast: Ana Turpin, Luisa Gavasa, Cristóbal Suárez, Ana Otero, Inma Cuesta, Begoña Maestre, Iago García, Manu Fullola, Manuel Baqueiro, Itziar Miranda, Pastora Vega, Simón Andreu, Joan Crosas, and Emilio Gutiérrez Caba.

=== 1948–1950 Season 3 ===
Started: 4 September 2007

Ended: 3 September 2008

Episodes: 258 + 2 primes times

Principal love story: Alicia Peña (Sara Casasnovas) & Fernando Solís (Carlos García)

Main cast: Manuel Baqueiro, Itziar Miranda, Emilio Gutiérrez Caba, Sara Casasnovas, Marta Calvó, Antonio Valero, Jesús Cabrero, José Antonio Sayagués, Ana Labordeta, Ana Villa, Lola Marceli, Eusebio Lázaro, and Luis Perezagua.

=== 1950–1952 Season 4 ===
Started: 4 September 2008

Ended: 27 August 2009

Episodes: 255 + 2 primes times

Principal love story: Ana Rivas (Marina San José) & Teresa García (Carlota Olcina)

Main cast: Manuel Baqueiro, Itziar Miranda, José Antonio Sayagués, Ana Labordeta, Ana Villa, Lola Marceli, Marina San José, Carlota Olcina, Javier Collado, Manuel Bandera, Cristina de Inza, Pepa Pedroche, Clara Sanchís, Álex García, Ángel Pardo, and Miguel Ortiz

=== 1952–1953 Season 5 ===
Started: 28 August 2009

Ended: 3 September 2010

Episodes: 256 + 2 primes times

Principal love story: Ana Rivas (Marina San José) & Teresa García (Carlota Olcina)

Main cast: Manuel Baqueiro, Itziar Miranda, José Antonio Sayagués, Marina San José, Carlota Olcina, Javier Collado, Pepa Pedroche, Álex García, Bárbara Lennie, Jaume García, Verónika Moral, Maite Blasco, Tomás del Estal, Cayetana Guillén Cuervo, Nacho Fresneda, Petra Martínez, Pep Munné, Rocío Madrid, Marco Martínez, Alfonso Lara, María Isasi, Fede Aguado, and Carmen Morales.

=== 1954–1955 Season 6 ===
Started: 6 September 2010

Ended: 2 September 2011

Episodes: 261 + 1 prime time

Protagonist: Irene Medina (Eva Martín)

Main cast: Manuel Baqueiro, Itziar Miranda, José Antonio Sayagués, Eva Martín, José Luis García Pérez, Roberto San Martín, Cristina Plazas, Marcos Gracia, Maica Barroso, Joaquín Climent, Nadia de Santiago, Roser Tapias, Macarena García, Carmen Gutiérrez, Jaroslaw Bielski, Israel Elejalde, Juan Antonio Quintana, Isabel Serrano, Paco Maestre, and Fiorella Faltoyano.

=== 1956–1957 Season 7 ===
Started: 5 September 2011

Ended: 15 November 2012

Episodes: 256

Principal love story: Cecilia Armenteros (Natalia Sánchez) & Alberto Cepeda (Gonzalo Ramos)

Main cast: Manuel Baqueiro, Itziar Miranda, José Antonio Sayagués, Maica Barroso, Joaquín Climent, Nadia de Santiago, Natalia Millán, Natalia Sánchez, Lola Baldrich, Javier Collado, Fede Aguado, Gonzalo Ramos, Juan Díaz, Juanjo Puigcorbé, and Juan Gea.

== Cast ==
Actor	Character	Episodes
Manuel Baqueiro	Marcelino "Marce" Gómez Díaz	1–1707
Itziar Miranda	María Manuela "Manolita" Sanabria Méndez de Gómez	3–1707
José Antonio Sayagués	Pelayo Gómez Toledo	1–1707
Francisco Algora	José "Pepe" Ramírez Olivares	1–22
Sebastián Fernández	Sebastián "Sebas" Fernández González	21–1707
Héctor Colomé	Fabián Robles	1–151
Félix Gómez	Rodrigo Robles Castillo	1–176
Luis Hacha	Eduardo Ayala de la Torre	1 / 88 – 176
Pilar Bardem	Elpidia Grande viuda de Ramírez	1–184
Rodolfo Sancho	Antonio Ramírez Grande	1–199
Ágata Lys	Eulalia de la Torre de Ayala	1–199
Jesús Noguero	Rafael Serrano Lazón	1–199
José Conde	Javier Ayala	1–199
Elisa Garzón	Consuelo Martín Fresneda de Ayala	1–227
Pastora Vega	Angustias Pastor Grijalbo de Domínguez	200–259
Chema León	Amador de Suances Pacheco	204–397
Inma Cuesta	Elisa Domínguez Pastor de De la Cruz "Elisa Pastor"	200–420
Begoña Maestre	Carlota Domínguez Pastor viuda de Matías	200–420
Manu Fullola	Marcos de la Cruz Torra	200–420
Iago García	Ernesto Expósito	200–420
Joan Crosas	Ramiro Olavide	200–420
Simón Andreu	Ildefonso de Suances Ruiz	200–420
Emilio Gutiérrez Caba	Joaquín Peña Soler	412–421
Ana Otero	Paloma Beltrán-Turner	1–440
Eusebio Lázaro	Don Francisco "Paco" Valpuesta Cebreiro	422–527
Pilar Barrera	Purificación "Pura" Fresneda de Bulnes	1–391 / 439 – 620
Luis Pérezagua	Isidro Bulnes	1–391 / 427 – 621
Nacho López	Carlos Roldán Caballero	438–658
Antonio Valero	Hipólito Roldán	383–664
Marta Calvó	Regina Caballero Belmez viuda de Roldán	384–664
Paloma Tabasco	Enriqueta Muñoz Rodríguez de Gómez	203–752
Jesús Cabrero	Álvaro Iniesta Pérez	449–665 / 797 – 817
Luisa Gavasa	Loreto Castillo viuda de Robles	1–226 / 823
Ana Turpin	Andrea Robles Castillo	1–199 / 224 – 226 / 778 – 825
Jorge Monje	Juan Ruiz de Apodaca "Juanito el Chico" / Lázaro Delgado	421–839
Cristóbal Suárez	Mario Ayala de la Torre	1–227 / 686 – 844
Lola Marceli	Julieta Fernández Valdés viuda de Gosálvez	421–845
Elena Seguí	Luisa Sanabria Torno de Ortiz	85–126 / 304 – 678 / 695 / 902
Cristina de Inza	Encarnación "Encarna" Llanos Núñez viuda de Rivas	678–909
Miguel Ortiz	Ovidio Salmerón Pérez	679–919
Manuel Bandera	Ramón Rivas	666–933
Clara Sanchís	Marta Ortiz Salaverría de Rivas	678–933
Pablo Viña	Pablo Domínguez Vera	200–933
Ana Labordeta	Rosario de Domínguez	200–933
Tomás del Estal	José María Pérez	660–1024
Pep Ferrer	Pascual García	656–906 / 1056 – 1066
Ángel Pardo	Simón Ruiz Valbuena	648–907 / 1108 – 1113
Petra Martínez	Adela Giner	934–1119
Álex García	Alfonso García Guerrero	669–1120
Pepa Pedroche	Carmen Guerrero de Ruiz	669–933 / 1025 – 1125
Maite Blasco	Lourdes Ariza Villar viuda de Salcedo	934–1140
Bárbara Lennie	Rosa Fernández "Mónica Cortés" (born Rosa Valle)	918–1189
Jaume García	Abel Zamora Bellido	933–1189
Verónika Moral	Cristina Barea del Toro de Zamora	934–1189
Rocío Madrid	Mariana Robledo	1021–1189
Raquel Quintana	Clementina Lázaro de Guerrero	678–1189
Daniel Retuerta / Marco Martínez	Ángel Gaspar Piñeiro	13–187 / 221 – 418 / 620 – 663 / 1025 – 1189
Beatriz Bergamín	María de la Fe "Marifé" López de Eduardo	678–1189
Alfonso Lara	Leonardo Guerrero	1042–1189
María Isasi	Fernanda "Diana" Coronado	934–1189
Cayetana Guillén Cuervo	Valle viuda de De la Vega "Estela del Val"	934–1189
Nacho Fresneda	Doctor Mauricio Salcedo Ariza	914–1189
Carmen Morales	Lucía Tudela de Salcedo	1084–1189
Pep Munné	Salvador Bellido Huerga	928–1189
Roberto Mori	Juan Hernández Caminero "Juanito el Grande"	421–933 / 1181 – 1189
Ana Villa	Soledad "Sole" Gálvez Prieto de Gaspar	200–933 / 1181 – 1189
Andrés Herrera	Juan Carreño Salazar	1215–1287
Paco Maestre	Celso González García	1215–1324
Fiorella Faltoyano	María Dolores Sánchez Crespo de González "Bibiana de Gáspari, Marquesa de Rocafermata"	1263–1342
Jaroslaw Bielski	Doctor Johann Lemper "Joachim Levi"	1190–1348
Roberto San Martín	Ubaldo Ramos Guzmán	1190–1379
Carmen Gutiérrez	Benita Sánchez Palomo	1190–1417
Cristina Plazas	Eulalia Prado Salvatierra de Hernández	1190–1440
Israel Ejalde	Matías Salazar Orgaz	1190–1446
Eva Martín	Irene Medina Díaz viuda de Ramos	1190–1450
José Luis García Pérez	Andrés Hernández Salvatierra	1190–1450
Marcos Gracia	Jaime Hernández Prado	1190–1450
Roser Tapias	Almudena Hernández Prado	1190–1450
Macarena García	Consuelo "Chelo" Muñoz Ruiz	1190–1450
Juan Antonio Quintana de la Rua	Basilio Ruiz Antón	1190–1450
Isabel Serrano	Adelina Sánchez Palomo de Hernández "Lina Guzmán"	1190–1450
Marina San José	Ana Rivas Ortiz viuda de García "Susana Fuentes"	677–1189 / 1444 – 1450
Carlota Olcina	Teresa García Guerrero de Perea	670–1189 / 1444 – 1450
Sergi Calleja	Jesús Rubín de Celis	1451–1628
Juan Gea	Víktor Ambrús	1488–1658
Jorge Calvo	Narciso Colmenar Carpio	1451–1701
Natalia Millán	Angélica Valdés viuda de Ambrús "Angélica Montes"	1488–1706
Alberto Jiménez	Teniente Coronel Eugenio Zúñiga López "Eugenio Armenteros López"	1451–1706
Natalia Sánchez	Cecilia Armenteros Marín de Robledo	1451–1706
Lola Baldrich	Rocío Zúñiga López viuda de Laguna	1451–1706
Héctor Tomás	Miguel Muñoz Ruiz	1190–1706
Gonzalo Ramos	Carlos Robledo "Alberto Cepeda Ortiz"	1451–1706
Javier Enguix	Capitán Gustavo Olavide	1451–1706
Juan Díaz	Julio Segura	1451–1706
Juanjo Puigcorbé	Inspector Domingo Vallejo	1451–1706
Joaquín Climent	Trinitario "Trino" Muñoz Calleja	1190–1707

== Prime-time ==
FLORES PARA BELLE (Flowers to Belle) – 2008

Episodes: 2

Fernando Solis remembers his first love, Belle, member of the French Resistance, like him, and how she died on a mission turned into a heroine. Flowers to Belle was awarded in February 2009 with the Jury Prize at the XI Festival International du Film de Télévision and Internet at Luchon (France) receiving the Pyrénées d'or for Best Foreign Film.

Characters:

- Ana Turpin – Andrea Robles Castillo
- Manuela Vellés – Belle, Fernando's girlfriend †
- Carlos García – Fernando Solís
- Ángel Hidalgo – Otto Ganz †
- Luisa Gavasa – Loreto Castillo viuda de Robles †
- Itziar Miranda – María Manuela "Manolita" Sanabria Méndez de Gómez
- Manuel Baqueiro – Marcelino "Marce" Gómez Díaz
- José Antonio Sayagués – Pelayo Gómez Toledo
- Ana Villa – Soledad "Sole" Gálvez Prieto
- Pablo Viña – Pablo Domínguez Vera
- Ana Otero – Paloma Beltrán viuda de Maturino

¿QUIÉN MATÓ A HIPÓLITO ROLDÁN? (Who killed Hipólito Roldán?) – 2009

Episodes: 2

Hipolito Roldán is found dead in his office. Looks like a suicide, but his psychiatrist, Dr. Julián Maldonado, is obsessed and will not stop until I find out who killed him.

Characters:

- Antonio Valero – Hipólito Roldán †
- Marta Calvó – Regina Caballero Belmez viuda de Roldán
- Sara Casasnovas – Alicia Peña Caballero de Iniesta
- Jesús Cabrero – Álvaro Iniesta Pérez
- Nacho López – Carlos Roldán Caballero
- María Cotiello – Matilde "Mati" Roldán Caballero
- Álex Angulo – Doctor Maeztu
- Itziar Miranda – María Manuela "Manolita" Sanabria Méndez de Gómez
- Manuel Baqueiro – Marcelino "Marce" Gómez Díaz
- José Antonio Sayagués – Pelayo Gómez Toledo
- Paloma Tabasco – Enriqueta Muñoz Rodríguez de Gómez
- Ana Villa – Soledad "Sole" Gálvez Prieto de Hernández
- Roberto Mori – Juan Hernández Caminero "Juanito el Grande"
- Pablo Viña – Pablo Domínguez Vera
- Miguel Ángel Muñoz – Doctor Julián Maldonado
- Carmen Morales – Sor Lucía Tudela

ALTA TRAICIÓN (Treason high) – 2010

Episodes: 2

Charles is convicted and executed on charges of treason. Paloma returns to Spain with her son, who kidnap his arrival. It begins like an adventure to find her son, which will be assisted (or treason) of a mysterious British.

Characters:

- Ana Otero – Paloma Beltrán-Carlyle
- Ginés García Millán – Patrick Turner
- Jordi Cadellans – Charles Aloysius Carlyle Laras †
- Joan Masotkleiner – Lord Martin Foster
- Nerea Garmendia – Catherine, nanny of Simón and MI6 spy
- Chema de Miguel – Sir James, attorney Charles
- Kaiet Rodríguez – Simón Carlyle Beltrán
- Itziar Miranda – María Manuela "Manolita" Sanabria Méndez de Gómez
- Manuel Baqueiro – Marcelino "Marce" Gómez Díaz
- Javier Collado – Comisario Héctor Perea Fernández

LA MUERTE A ESCENA (Death scene) – 2011

Episodes: 2

Three mysterious deaths conceal a tangle of economic interests and loves the detectives crossed Hector and Bonilla will have to discover.

Characters:

- Juanjo Puigcorbé – Inspector Domingo Vallejo
- Cayetana Guillén Cuervo – Valle viuda de De la Vega "Estela del Val"
- Javier Collado – Detective Héctor Perea Fernández
- Carlota Olcina – Teresa García Guerrero de Perea
- Marina San José – Ana Rivas Ortiz viuda de García
- Federico Aguado – Detective Inocencio Bonilla
- Beatriz Arguello – Ágata Villa
- María Isasi – Fernanda "Diana" Coronado
- Miguel Mota – Marcos de la Vega †
- Álex Molero – Quintín de las Heras †
- Sebastián Haro – Gabino Cifuentes
- Jordi Díaz – Jacobo Losada
- Adolfo Obregón – Doctor Torres
- Alfonso Vallejo – Honorio Ramos García †
- Pilar Massa – Laura de Vallejo
- Itziar Miranda – María Manuela "Manolita" Sanabria Méndez de Gómez
- Manuel Baqueiro – Marcelino "Marce" Gómez Díaz
- José Antonio Sayagués – Pelayo Gómez Toledo
- Nadia de Santiago – María de la Asunción "Asun" Muñoz Ruiz
- Maica Barroso – Felisa Ruiz Sanabria de Muñoz
- Macarena García – Consuelo "Chelo" Muñoz Ruiz
- Sebastián Fernández – Sebastián "Sebas" Ramírez Márquez
