= Achero Mañas =

Spanish film director (born 1966)

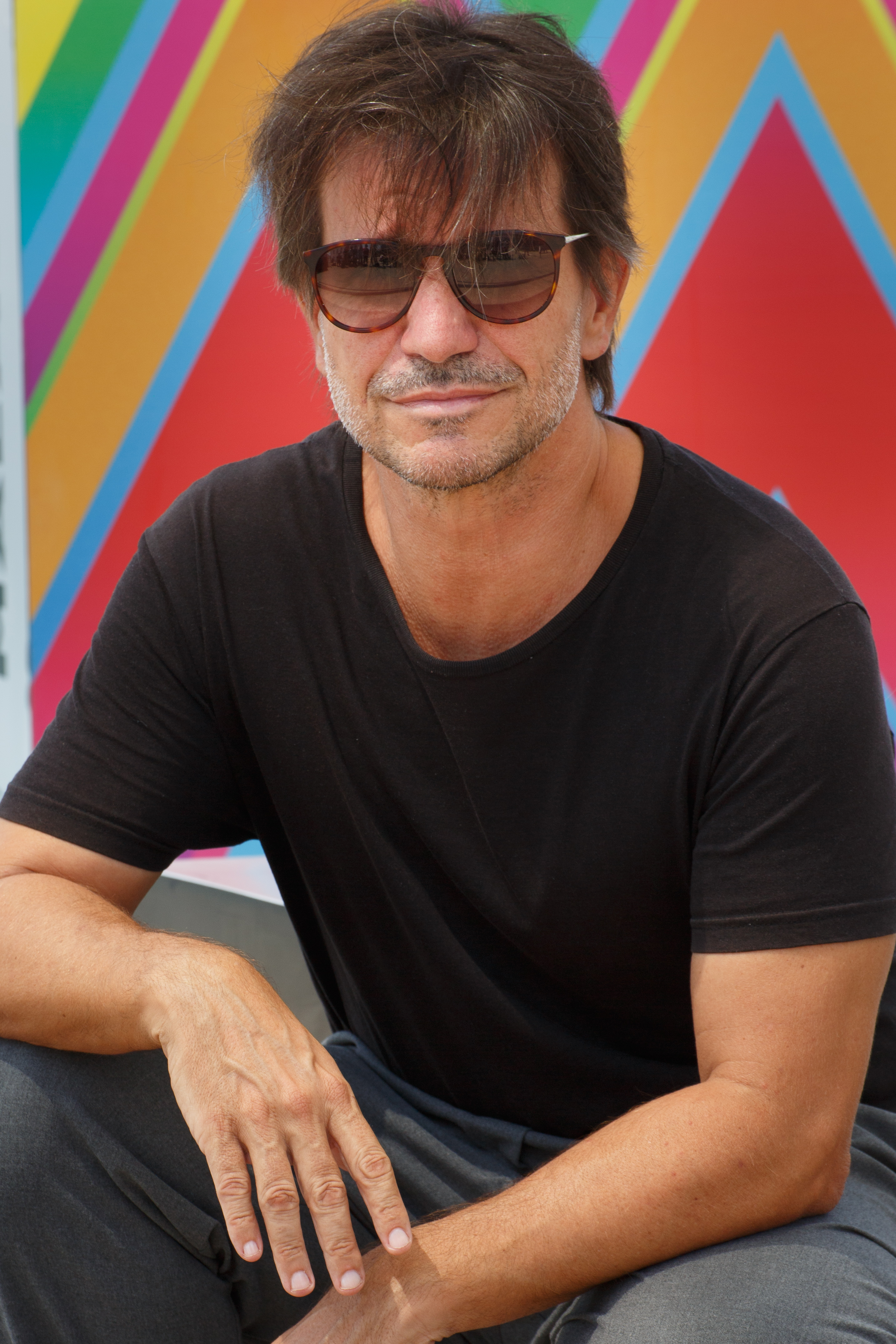
- Mañas in 2020
- Born: Achero Mañas Amyach; 5 September 1966 (age 59); Madrid, Spain
- Occupations: Film director; actor
- Notable work: El Bola

Achero Mañas (born Achero Mañas Amyach, 5 September 1966) is a Spanish film director and former actor. He made three successful short films before winning recognition and several awards for his feature film debut El Bola.

== Biography ==
Mañas was born in Madrid to actress Paloma Lorena and playwright Alfredo Mañas. Growing up in the neighbourhoods of Carabanchel and Estrella, he was surrounded and influenced by theatre, literature, and art from an early age, and this guided his academic pursuits and eventual career. He studied painting for 3 years at the Escuela de Artes y Oficios. At the same time, he acted in stage productions and held sporadic roles in cinema. In 1984, thanks to a scholarship obtained by his mother, Mañas moved to live with his family in New York City and studied at the Actors Studio. After returning to Spain, he resumed his acting career. He worked with various prestigious directors, including Adolfo Aristarain, Carlos Saura, Ridley Scott, Manuel Gutiérrez Aragón, José Luis Cuerda, and Jorge Grau.

When his daughter Laura was born, Mañas decided to quit acting and become a filmmaker. He wrote and directed his first short film, Metro, in 1995. The film won the Luis Buñuel Prize for cinematography and Best Short Film Prize at the Montecatini International Short Film Festival. In 1996, he wrote, directed, and produced his second short film, Cazadores (Hunters), which won several awards, among them the Goya for Best Fictional Short Film, the following year. In 1997, he wrote, directed, and produced his third and last short, Paraísos Artificiales (Artificial Paradises), which also won important national and international awards. El Bola (The Ball), his first feature film, premiered in 2001 and was well received by both critics and the public. The film went on to receive many national and international awards, among them four Goya awards for Best Original Screenplay, Best New Actor, Best New Director, and Best Film of the year. It also received several nominations from the European Film Academy and won the Fassbinder Award. In 2002, Mañas, together with his brother Federico, wrote his second feature film, Noviembre (November), which won several prestigious awards both nationally and internationally, among them the FIPRESCI Award at the Toronto International Film Festival, the Youth Award at the San Sebastián International Film Festival, and the Luis Buñuel Award for Cinematography. A year later, French television channel Canal Plus invited Mañas to direct a documentary on the peace process in Northern Ireland. There, he interviewed the principal parties to the conflict, among them Sinn Féin President Gerry Adams, the leader of the DUP (Democratic Unionist Party) Arlene Foster, and Nobel Peace Prize laureates John Hume and David Trimble.

Mañas' third feature film, Todo lo que tú quieras (Anything You Want), was selected for World Premiere at the Toronto International Film Festival in 2010. His fourth directorial production, Un mundo normal (A Normal World), was released in 2019.

== Filmography ==
=== As actor ===
- 1492: Conquest of Paradise (1992)
- ¡Dispara! (1993)
- Así en el cielo como en la tierra (1995)

=== As film director ===
Feature films

- El Bola (2000)
- Noviembre (2003)
- Todo lo que tú quieras (2010)
- Un mundo normal (2020)

Documentaries

- Blackwhite (2004)

Short films

- Metro (1994)
- Cazadores (1997)
- Paraísos artificiales (1998)
