= Marina San José =

Spanish actress

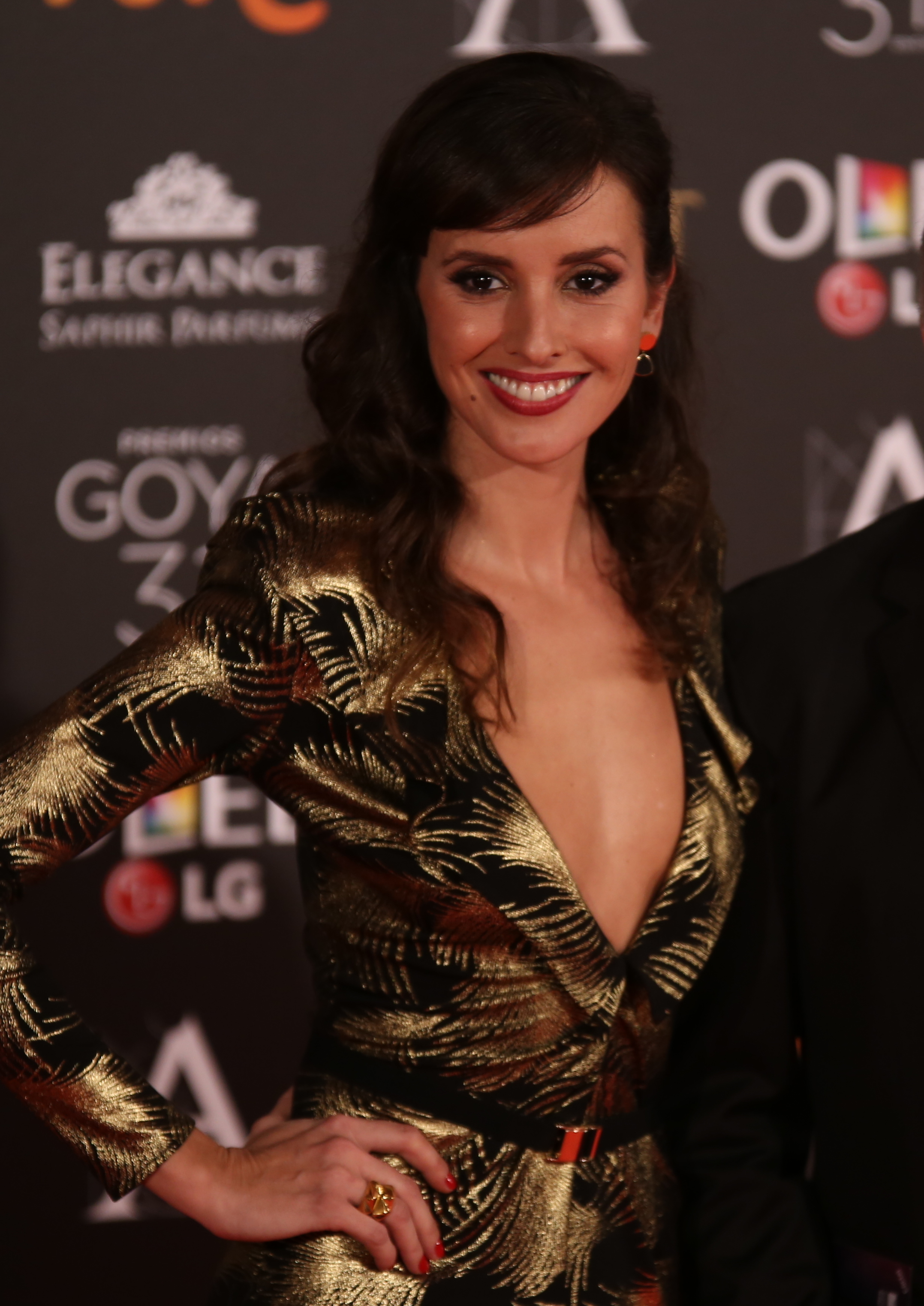
- San José at the 31st Goya Awards in 2017
- Born: Marina San José Cuesta; 16 September 1983 (age 42); Madrid, Spain
- Other names: Xana
- Occupation: Actress
- Years active: 1999–present
- Parent(s): Víctor Manuel; Ana Belén

Marina San José Cuesta (born 16 September 1983) is a Spanish actress. Mostly dedicated to theatre, she has also ventured into television and cinema, including her performance in the historical soap opera Amar en tiempos revueltos.

== Biography ==
Born in Madrid on 16 September 1983, she is the daughter of Ana Belén and Víctor Manuel. She played a minor role in the 1999 film Entre las piernas. She trained as an actress at the Laboratorio William Layton in Madrid. In 2005, she participated as choir singer under the alias 'Xana' in her parents' tour Una canción me trajo aquí.

Mainly dedicated to theatre, she had her debut with the stage play El cartero de Neruda in 2005. She has since starred in many stage plays including Móvil, Hermanas, Mathilde, ¡Sin paga, nadie paga!, 3 hermanas, El test, and Escape Room.

She earned recognition for her role as 'Ana Silva' in Amar en tiempos revueltos, playing along Carlota Olcina the iconic lesbian couple formed by Ana and Teresa. San José also starred in the lesbian-related comedy film De chica en chica, released in 2015. In 2017, San José participated in the competitive cooking show MasterChef Celebrity.

She performed the character 'Ángeles Acosta' in the series 45 revoluciones (45 rpm), aired on Antena 3 in 2019.

== Filmography ==
Television

Year	Title	Role	Notes	Ref.
2008–2012	Amar en tiempos revueltos	Ana Rivas		
2012	La que se avecina	Alejandra	Cameo	
2013	Gran Reserva	Ainhoa		
2019	45 revoluciones (45 rpm)	Ángeles Acosta		

Film

Year	Title	Role	Notes	Ref.
1999	Entre las piernas (Between Your Legs)		Minor role	
2015	De chica en chica (Girl Gets Girl)	Blanca		

== Awards and nominations ==
Year	Award	Category	Work	Result	Ref.
2016	25th Actors and Actresses Union Awards	Best New Actress	Girl Gets Girl	Nominated	
2018	68th Fotogramas de Plata	Best Stage Actress	El Test	Nominated	
