= Silvia Alonso =

Spanish actress (born 1989)

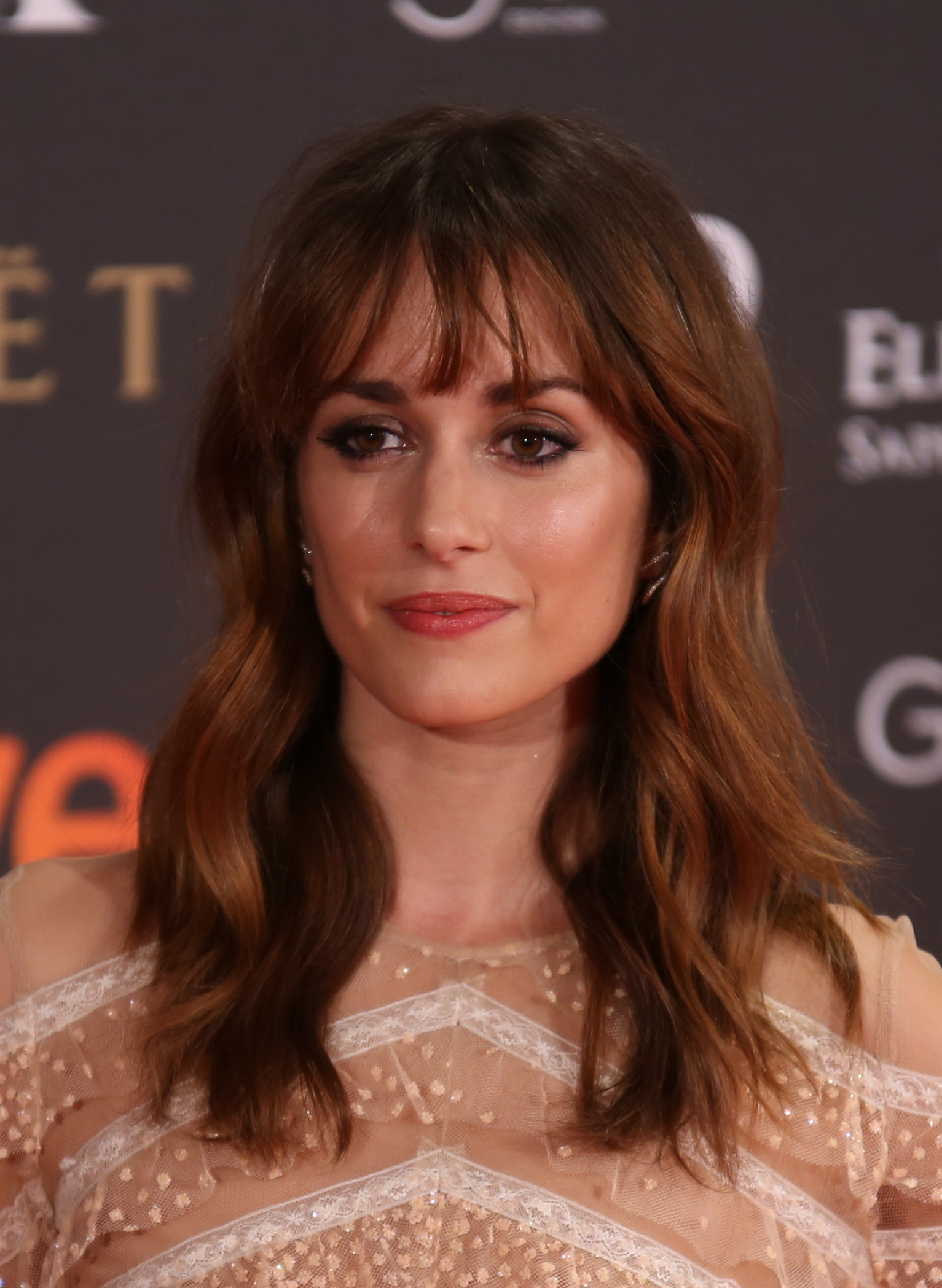
- Alonso at the 31st Goya Awards in 2017
- Born: Silvia Alonso Cruz; 28 December 1989 (age 36); Salamanca, Spain
- Occupation: Actress
- Partner(s): Álex García (2010); David Broncano (2021–present)

Silvia Alonso Cruz (born 28 December 1989, in Salamanca) is a Spanish actress. Her debut was as the protagonist of the Telecinco series Tierra de lobos, playing Almudena Lobo. She has participated in different Spanish series such as Amar es para siempre, Sin identidad and Tiempos de guerra.

== Biography ==
Cruz was educated in the schools of interpretation Arte 4 and Metropolis. She has also taken courses of interpretation before the camera and oriental dance.

In 2010 she gained fame thanks to her role as Almudena Lobo in the Telecinco series Tierra de lobos, which premiered its first season on 29 September 2010. Due to its good audiences the series was renewed until the third season, with Alonso being protagonist of all of them.

In 2013 she joined the shooting of the second season of the series Amar es para siempre, broadcast on Antena 3 daily. Alonso played Alejandra Torrijos, a young researcher who is involved in a relationship with Luis Ardanza (Jordi Rebellón), her teacher. They both left the series after the end of the second season.

In 2014 she made her first foray into the cinema participating in the film Shrew's Nest with Macarena Gómez and Nadia de Santiago. Also that year she joined the recurring cast of Telecinco's comedy series La que se avecina, where she played Patricia, the social worker who helped Amador (Pablo Chiapella) and Maite (Eva Isanta).

In April 2015, she joined the second season of the Antena 3 series Sin identidad. There she played Helena López until the series ended. Also that year she participated as a guest character in the Antena 3 series Velvet, playing Michelle.

In February 2016, Antena 3 premiered the series Perdiendo el norte in which Alonso played Adela, a young Spanish woman living in Berlin who meets Carol (Belén Cuesta), another Spanish emigrant who makes her start to doubt her style of life. In addition, that year also premiered La corona partida, a film that links the series Isabel and Carlos, rey emperador, both on Televisión Española. In the film she played Germaine of Foix, who was the second wife of Ferdinand II of Aragon after the death of Isabella the Catholic.

In 2017 she appeared in the films It's for Your Own Good, by Carlos Therón, and Lord, Give Me Patience, by Álvaro Díaz Lorenzo. Also for 2017 was the scheduled premiere of the Antena 3 series Tiempos de guerra.

== Filmography ==
=== Television ===
Years	Title	Role	Station	No. of episodes
2010–14	Tierra de lobos	Almudena Lobo	Telecinco	41
2013	Amar es para siempre	Alejandra Torrijos Martín	Antena 3	59
2014–15	La que se avecina	Patricia	Telecinco	10
2015	Sin identidad	Helena López Prats	Telecinco	12
2015	Velvet	Michelle	Telecinco	2
2016	Buscando el norte	Adela Llamazares Nieto	Telecinco	8
2017–	Tiempos de guerra (Morocco: Love in Times of War)	Susana Márquez de la Maza	Telecinco	
2019	Instinto	Eva Vergara	Movistar+	

2025 Suspicious Minds Amber

Hulu 6 Episodes

=== Films ===
- Shrew's Nest, as Doña Puri's niece. Dir. Juanfer Andrés and Esteban Roel (2014)
- La corona partida, as Germaine of Foix. Dir. Jordi Frades (2015)
- It's for Your Own Good, as Valentina. Dir. Carlos Therón (2017)
- Lord, Give Me Patience, as Alicia Zaldívar Ramos. Dir. Álvaro Díaz Lorenzo (2017)
- Love at First Kiss (2023)

=== Short films ===
- Antidote, with the Complutense University of Madrid (2008).
- Hakushi, distribution. Dir. Guy Khandjian (2008).
- Divina comedia, distribution. Dir. Sebastián Cardemil (2009).
- Siempre tarde, distribution. Dir. Fermín Pérez (2009).
- Una de almejas, distribution. Dir. José Pena Millor (2009).
- La trampa, distribution. Dir. Javier Oyarzo (2009).
- Yo nunca, distribution. Dir. Ana Belén Domínguez Nevado (2009).
- Tópicos, distribution. Dir. Javier Oyarzo (2009).
- Zona muerta, distribution. Dir. Javier Oyarzo. Half-length film (2009).
- Mentiras, as Muriel. Dir. Ana de Nevado (2011).
- Como yo te amo, as Patricia. Dir. Fernando García-Ruiz (2017).

=== Theatre ===
- Sexo 10.0. Dir. Chos Corzo
- Futuro 10.0. Dir. Chos Corzo
- Much Ado About Nothing. Dir. Juan López Tagle

== Video clips ==
- Caída libre (2016), by Zahara

== Private life ==
In 2010 she had a brief romance with her co-star Álex García. Since 2021, she has been in a relationship with comedian and television host David Broncano.
