= Ledaña =

Municipality of Spain

Coordinates: 39°22′N 1°42′W

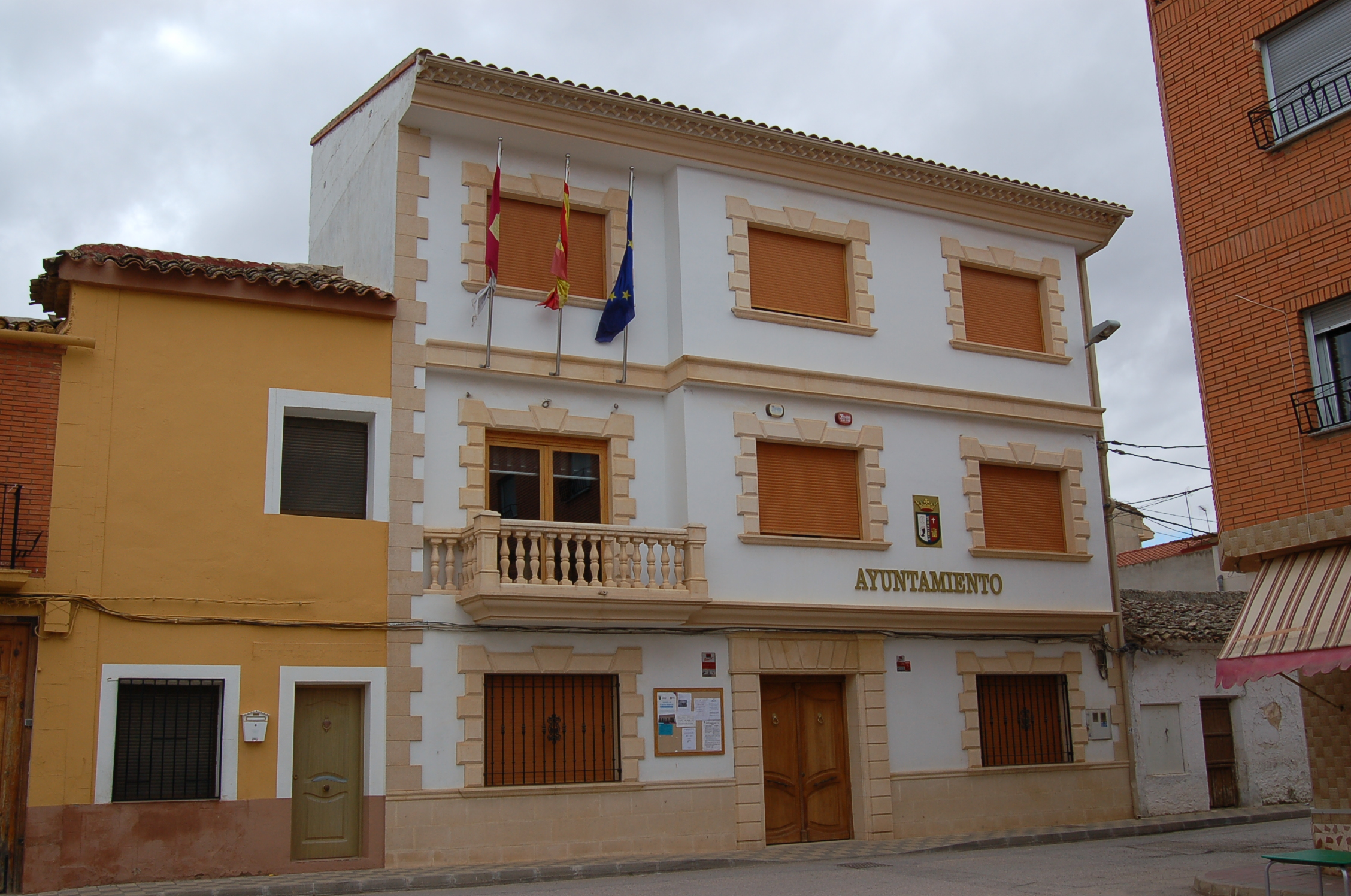
Town hall

Ledaña is a municipality in Cuenca, Castile-La Mancha, Spain. It has a population of 1,882.

Ledaña's coat of arms

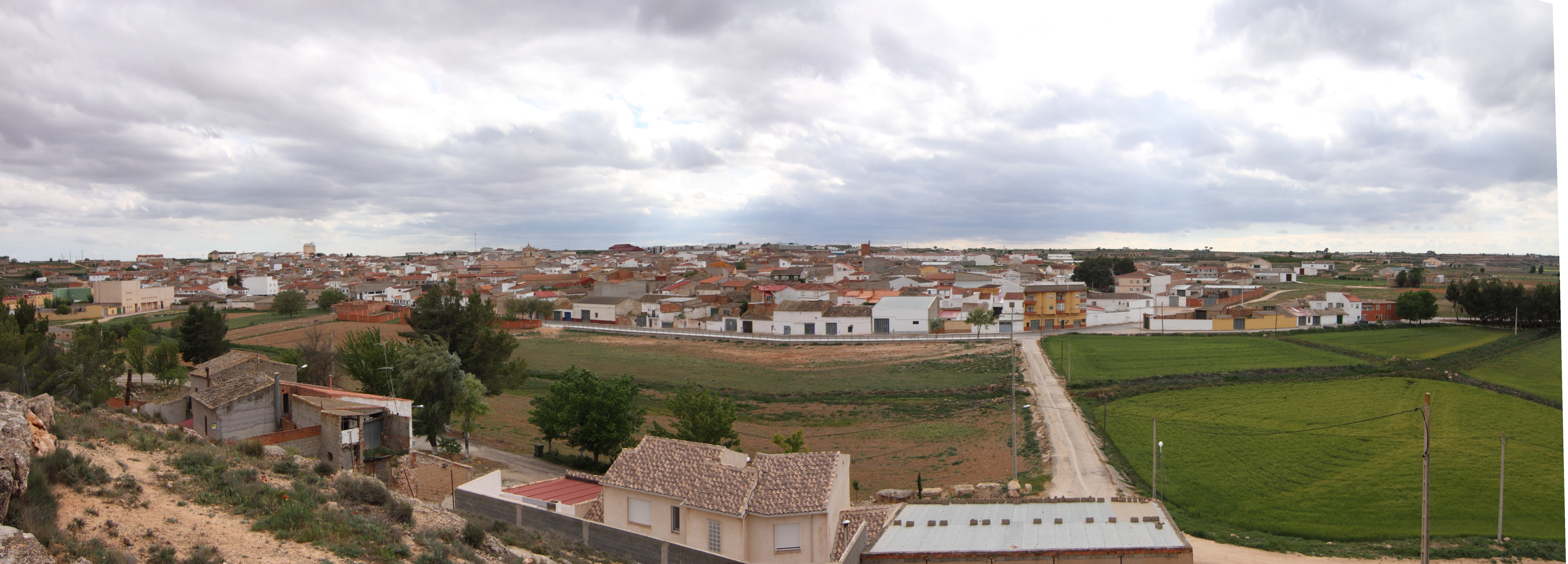
Panorama
