= Juan Díaz Pardeiro =

Spanish actor (born 1976)

Juan Díaz
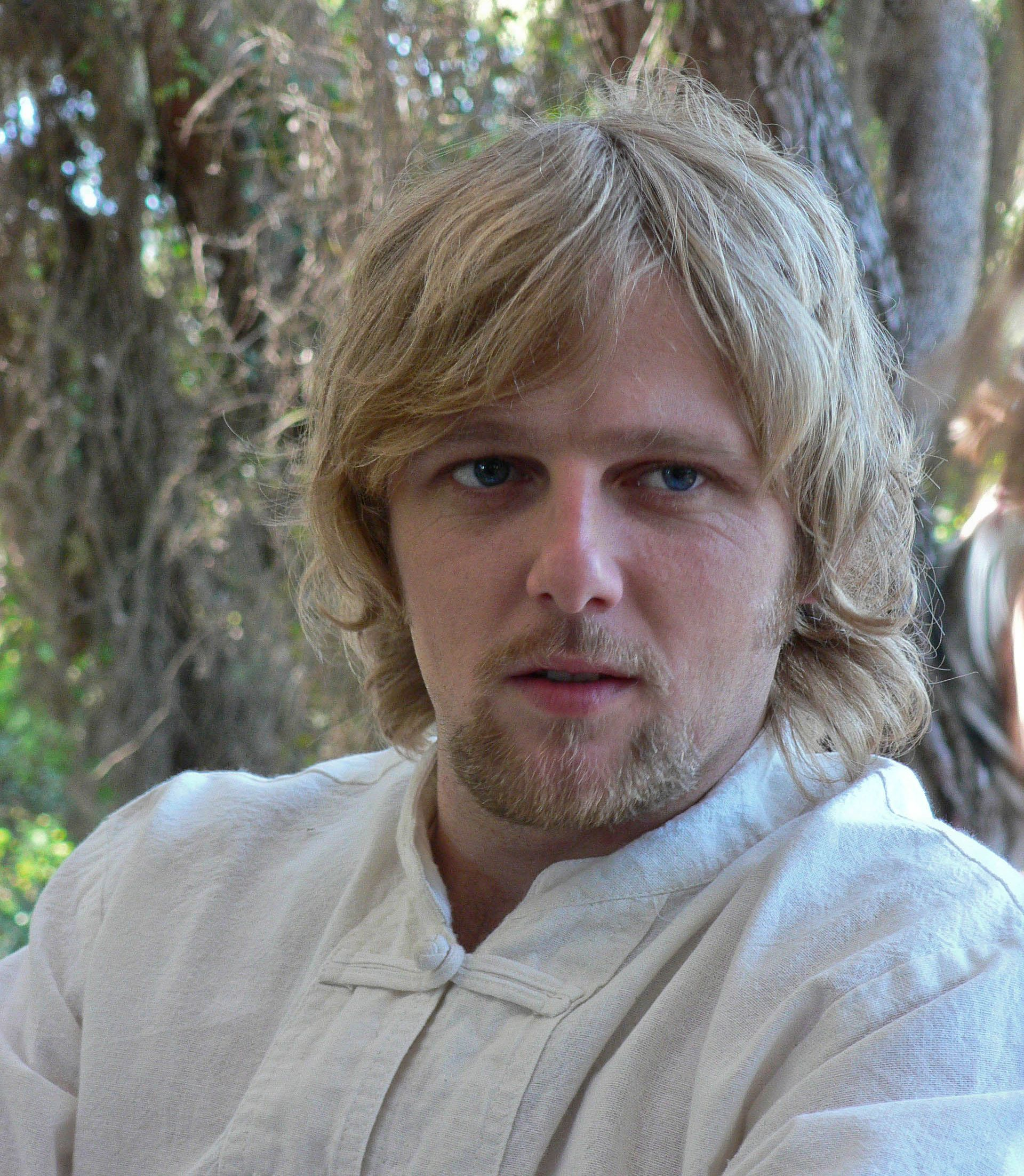
- Born: Juan Díaz Pardeiro; May 12, 1976 (age 49); Spain
- Occupation: Actor

Juan Díaz Pardeiro (born 12 May 1976) is a Spanish actor.

== Biography ==
He made his acting debut in 1995, appearing in both film and television, including an episode of Hermanos de leche and a small role in the film Tell Laura I Love Her (film). In 1998, he landed his first recurring roles, again on television. In La vida en el aire, he played Charly, while in A las once en casa, he portrayed the role of Luis for several seasons.

He later focused his career on film, appearing in movies such as Heart of the Warrior (1999), Fill Me with Life (2000), Gente pez (2001), and No debes estar aquí (2002).

In 2004, he returned to television as a regular cast member of the series Aquí no hay quien viva, in which he played Álex Guerra Ruiz, though he continued to appear in various feature films, such as Manuel Iborra’s La dama boba (2006), Miguel Alcantud’s Anastezsi (2007), and Dany Saadia 3:19 (2008).

In 2011, he joined the cast of the Telecinco series Punta Escarlata and the soap opera Amar en tiempos revueltos, where he played the character Julio Segura for nearly two hundred episodes.

In 2014, he appeared as Samuel in the Televisión Española series Cuéntame cómo pasó , playing a coworker of the Alcántara family’s eldest son.

In 2021, he was a candidate for the Recortes Cero-Partido Castellano-Tierra Comunera party in the Madrid Regional elections.

== Television ==
- La caza. Monteperdido (2019) as Gaizka on La 1.
- Conquistadores: Adventvm (2017) as Antonio Pigafetta on Cero
- Cuéntame cómo pasó (2014-) as Samuel on La 1
- Amar en tiempos revueltos (2011-2012) as Julio Segura on La 1
- Punta Escarlata (2011) as Rudy on Telecinco
- Los misterios de Laura (2011) as Quintín's brother on La 1
- Sin tetas no hay paraíso (2008) as El Buco on Telecinco
- Aquí no hay quien viva (2004-2005) as Álex Guerra Ruiz on Antena 3
- A las once en casa (1998-1999) as Luis on La 1
- La vida en el aire (1998) as Charly on La 2
