= Paula Usero =

Spanish actress (born 1991)

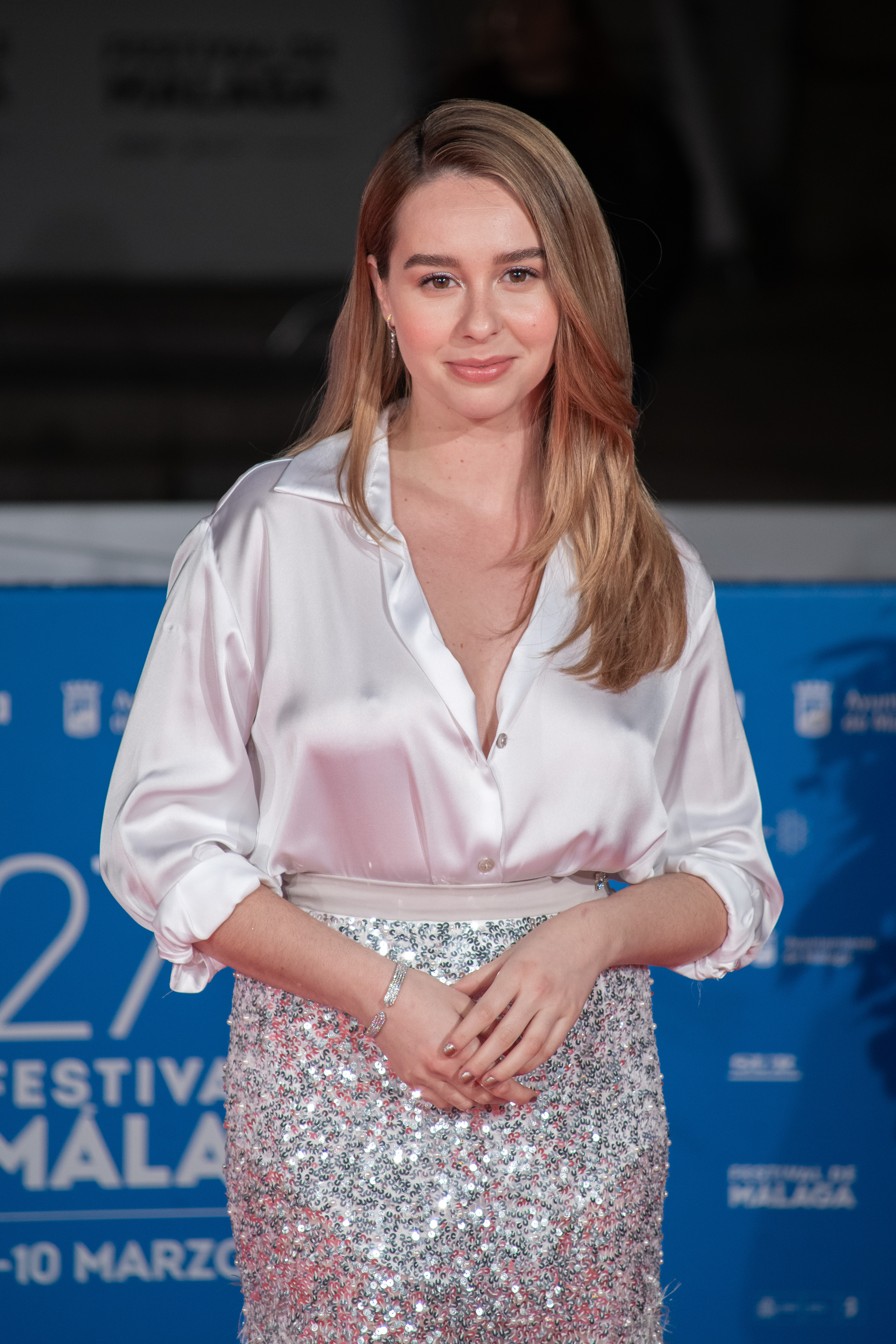
- Usero in 2024
- Born: Paula Usero García; 22 October 1991 (age 34); Valencia, Spain
- Occupation: Actress
- Years active: 2016–present

Paula Usero García (born 22 October 1991) is a Spanish actress, best known for her roles in the 2020 comedy film Rosa's Wedding and the television series Love Is Forever.

== Filmography ==
=== Film ===
Year	Title	Original title	Role	Notes
2016	The Olive Tree	El olivo	Adelle	
2020	Rosa's Wedding	La boda de Rosa	Lidia	Nominated - Goya Award for Best New Actress
2022	Full of Grace	Llenos de Gracia	Sister Angelines	Nominated - Berlanga Award for Best Supporting Actress
2024	Alone in the Night	Solos en la noche	Marisol	

=== Television ===
Year	Title	Original title	Role	Notes
2017–2018	Velvet Collection	Velvet Colección	Inés	20 episodes
2019	Just Before Christ	Justo antes de Cristo	Rosaura	Episode: "Un momento de paz"
2018–2020	Love Is Forever	Amar es para siempre	Luisita	89 episodes
2020–2021	#Luimelia	#Luimelia	Luisita	26 episodes
2021	The Cook of Castamar	La Cocinera de Castamar	Elisa Costa	
2023	Girls' Night Out	Noche de chicas	Kira	6 episodes
2024		Las abogadas	Lola González	6 episodes

== Theatre ==
Usero also has a background in stage acting, having performed in several classical and contemporary plays in Spain.

- Macbeth by William Shakespeare. Directed by Vicente Genovés. Teatro Rialto, Valencia.
- Mar i Cel by Àngel Guimerà. Directed by Pilar Silla. ESAD Valencia.
- La habitación de Isabella by Jan Lauwers. Directed by Rafael Ricart.
- Locos, locos, locos. Directed by Alberto Monrabal.
- Adela in The House of Bernarda Alba by Federico García Lorca. ESAD Valencia.
- Nina in The Seagull by Anton Chekhov.
- Elena in Going Down to Morocco (Bajarse al moro) by José Luis Alonso de Santos.
- A True Friend (Un amigo de verdad) by Miguel Ferrando-Rocher.
