= Nani Jiménez =

Spanish actress and model

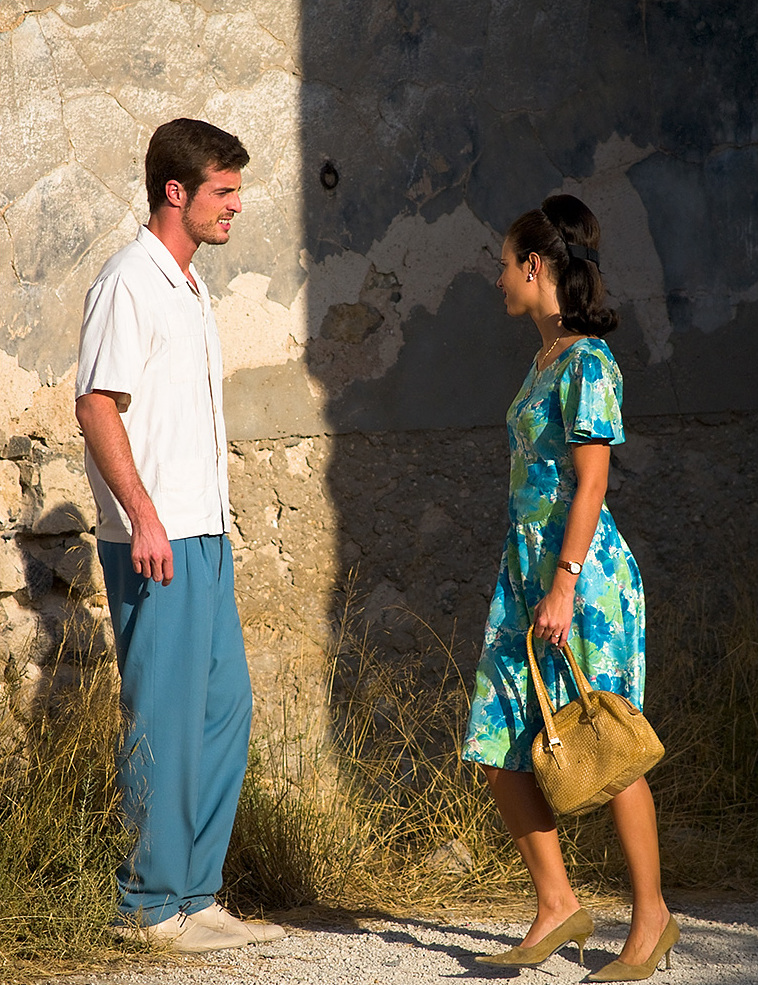
- Jiménez and Miguel Barberá on L'Alqueria Blanca
- Born: Nani Jiménez Puerta; 9 December 1981 (age 43); Valencia, Spain
- Occupation(s): Actress, model
- Partner: Miguel Barberá

Nani Jiménez Puerta (born 9 December 1981) is a Spanish actress and model, best known for her role as Asun Falcó on the television series L'Alqueria Blanca.

== Career ==
Nani Jiménez gained a measure of popularity in the Valencian Community by playing the role of Assun Falcó on the Nou regional TV series L'Alqueria Blanca.

In 2009, she joined El Internado, playing Amaia, a student of Laguna Negra Boarding School who has a hard time becoming part of Marcos's group of friends. She remained on the series from the end of the sixth season until the seventh, when it finished.

In 2011, Jiménez played the young resident Ariadna on the 20th season of Hospital Central.

In 2012 she was part of the cast of the series Isabel, portraying Isabel "Zoraida" de Solís, Queen of Granada, who was kidnapped by Sultan Muley Hacén. In 2015 she appeared on the daily series Amar es para siempre, playing Isabel Hernández.

She has worked as a model in some advertising campaigns, has appeared in feature films such as Tres días and Lo que tiene el otro, and television movies such as Mi último verano con Marián.

== Private life ==
Nani Jiménez maintains a romantic relationship with actor Miguel Barberá. They had a son together in 2017.

== Filmography ==
=== Television ===
- El cas de la núvia dividida (2006), TV movie
- Mi último verano con Marián (2007) as Carla, TV movie
- L'Alqueria Blanca (2007–2012) as Assun Falcó Martínez
- El Internado (2009–2010) as Amaia González
- 6 motivos para dudar de tus amigos (2011), TV movie
- Carmina (2011), miniseries
- Hospital Central (2012) as Ariadna Rubio
- Isabel (2013) as Isabel "Zoraida" de Solís
- Los misterios de Laura, episode "Laura y el misterio de los ratones atrapados" (2014) as Beatriz Vila
- Amar es para siempre (2015) as Isabel Hernández

=== Feature films ===
- Lo que tiene el otro (2007)
- Tres días (2008)
- Sexykiller (2008)
- To Steal from a Thief (2016) as Laura

=== Short films ===
- Un reflejo de ti (2012) as She
