= César Camino =

Spanish actor

- Born: 12 June 1973 (age 52); Madrid, Spain
- Occupation: Actor
- Years active: 2001–present

César Camino (born 12 June 1973) is a Spanish film and television actor.

== Filmography ==
=== Television ===
Year	Title	Character
2015	Aquí Paz y después Gloria	Curro
2012–13	Frágiles	Jorge
2011	Plaza de España	Tiberio
2011	La que se avecina	Director of an advertisement
2010	La pecera de Eva	
2010	Impares Premium	Jesús Amorós
2009	La que se avecina	
2009–	Los misterios de Laura	Vicente Cuevas
2009	Bicho malo (nunca muere)	Guaperas
2009	Generación DF	Carlos
2008–10	La tira	
2008	Impares	Jesús Amorós
2007–09	Hermanos y detectives	
2006	Hospital Central	Dr. Edu Rodríguez
2005	Agitación + IVA	Tio Moñas
2005	Aída	Wheelchair basketball player
2004	El comisario	

=== Film ===
Year	Title
2019	Bajo el mismo techo
2008	Sexykiller
2007	20-N: Los últimos días de Franco
2003	La fiesta
