= Lea Vélez =

Spanish author, screenwriter and journalist

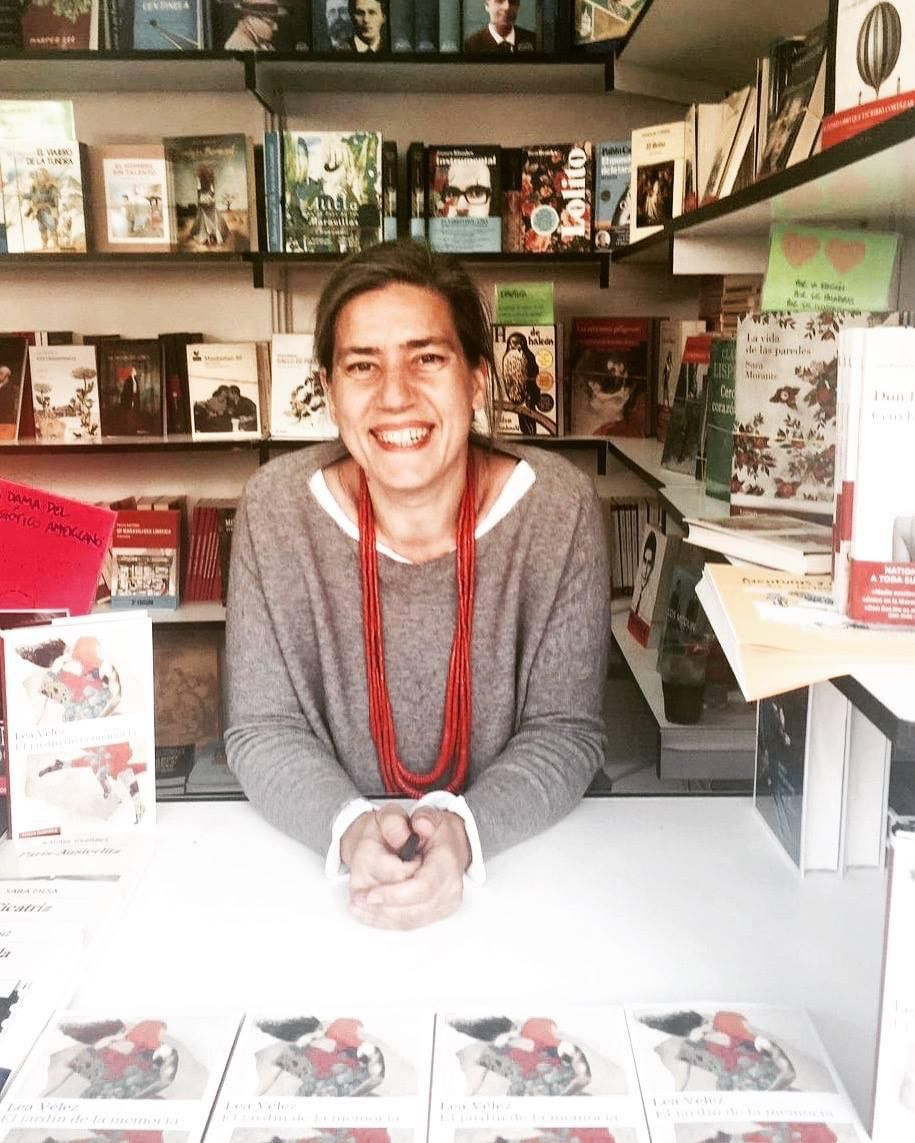
- Vélez in 2014
- Born: Lea González-Vélez Martín; May 16, 1970 (age 56); Madrid, Spain
- Occupations: Author, Screenwriter
- Children: 2
- Awards: Agustín González Theater Prize (2009)
- Writing career
- Language: Spanish
- Genre: Fiction

Lea Vélez (Madrid, May 16, 1970) is a Spanish author, screenwriter and journalist.

== Early life and education ==
She was born into a family with a broad literary tradition. Daughter of the intellectual Carlos Vélez (1930–2014), she studied journalism at the Complutense University of Madrid and graduated in Film Screenwriting at ECAM (Madrid cinema school).

== Career ==
Her television career began in 1998, writing storyline and scripts for the series El súper. She has been a fiction content creator and show runner, co-creating series such as La Verdad de Laura or Luna Negra. She has created more than 700 hours of TV fiction.

For many years she collaborated closely with the screenwriter and author Susana Prieto. Writing as a team they published two novels, El desván (2004) and La Esfera de Ababol (2006). Later she takes on the stage with the play Tiza (2008), also in collaboration with Prieto, a satire on education that received the Agustín González Theater Prize and remained on the Madrid billboard for three seasons.

After the death of her husband in 2011, she changed the direction of her career, leaving television aside to dedicate herself entirely to literature and the education of her small children. For them, and in an effort to overcome grief, she built a tree house in the large oak tree in the garden without anybody's help. The reflections she reached were used in her novel Nuestra casa en el árbol (Our Tree House), in which she narrates the adventures of a widow with three children in a large house by the River Hamble after losing her husband. A year before this book she wrote La cirujana de Palma and El Jardín de la memoria (2014).

Our tree house was published in 2017 and became a long seller, a book recommended and loved by readers over the years. It is of particular interest to the gifted children parent's community. The same year she published La Olivetti, la espía y el loro, a book in which she narrates the back stage of the TV program Encuentros con las letras, directed by her father and for which her mother, María Luisa Martín, ran the press office from the kitchen of her house while small Lea played under the table.

Other recent books are La sonrisa de los pájaros (2019) or Mi querido extraterrestre (2020). In 2024 she published La hija de Gardel, a political thriller in the context of the trials of the Argentine military in Spain and the underworld of state terrorism.

She currently lives in Brighton (East Sussex, England), with her two children.

== Awards and honours ==
- Agustín González Theater Prize (2009)

== Bibliography ==
=== Novels ===
- La hija de Gardel. Contraluz, 2024
- Mi querido extraterreestre. Destino, 2020
- La sonrisa de los pájaros. Destino, 2019
- Nuestra casa en el árbol. Destino, 2017
- La Olivetti, el espía y el loro. Sílex, 2017
- El jardín de la memoria. Galaxia Gutenberg, 2014
- La cirujana de Palma. Ediciones B, 2014
- La esfera de Ababol. (with Susana Prieto) Planeta, 2006
- El desván. (with Susana Prieto) Plaza & Janés, 2004

=== Theatre ===
- Tiza (with Susana Prieto), 2008
