= El Internado =

Spanish teen drama thriller television series

- Genre: Mystery; Serial drama Thriller; Romance; Sci-Fi
- Created by: Daniel Écija; Laura Belloso; Juan Carlos Cueto; Rocío Martínez-Llano
- Starring: Yon González; Blanca Suárez; Martiño Rivas; Ana de Armas; Elena Furiase; Natalia Millán; Luis Merlo; Marta Torné; Amparo Baró; Marta Hazas; Irene Montalà; Carlos Leal; Cristina Marcos; Denisse Peña; Daniel Retuerta; Raúl Fernández de Pablo; Javier Ríos; Lola Baldrich; Carlota García; Ismael Martínez; Javier Cidoncha; Yolanda Arestegui; Luis Mottola
- Country of origin: Spain
- Original language: Spanish
- No. of seasons: 7
- No. of episodes: 71

Production
- Producer: Globomedia
- Running time: 75 minutes approx.

Original release
- Network: Antena 3
- Release: 24 May 2007 – 13 October 2010

Related
- The Boarding School: Las Cumbres

El Internado (The Boarding School), also known as El Internado: Laguna Negra (The Black Lagoon Boarding School) is a Spanish mystery drama thriller television series produced by Globomedia for the Spanish network Antena 3. The series was originally broadcast in Spain from 24 May 2007 to 13 October 2010. The series began airing on Netflix on 15 July 2015, and it stopped airing on 20 December 2017. Then, the series was reaired on 16 October 2018.

A reboot series, El Internado: Las Cumbres, premiered on Amazon Prime Video on 19 February 2021.

== Synopsis ==
=== First season ===
Marcos Novoa Pazos (Martiño Rivas) and Paula Novoa Pazos (Carlota García), two Galician siblings whose parents have disappeared on the high seas, go to El Internado: Laguna Negra under the custody and guardianship of the director, Héctor de la Vega (Luis Merlo).

María Almagro (Marta Torné) is also new, entering as a cleaner. Alfonso Ceballos Parra (Francisco Merino) trusts Victoria Martínez González (Elena Furiase) and Carolina Leal de Solis (Ana de Armas) to tell them a secret: boarding school is dangerous and they have to get out of there. To do this, he meets them at night in the cemetery near the building. The girls tell Iván Noiret León (Yon González), Roque Sánchez Navas (Daniel Retuerta), Cayetano Montero Ruiz (Fernando Tielve) and Marcos, who go to meet Alfonso, but he ends up not being there. This is because he got kidnapped and put in the underground tunnels to die.

=== Second season ===
The death of Cayetano has further awakened the interest of the boys to know who is behind all the strange murders committed in the boarding school, especially for Roque, a faithful friend of the deceased and supposedly the last person he spoke with. Mateo Tabuenca (Alejandro Botto) a new math teacher, arrives. At the same time, a new, somewhat troubled student, Julia Medina Jiménez (Blanca Suárez), comes to El Internado after having had a romantic relationship with her stepfather. Vicky has other matters to attend to since Cristina Palacios, a girl from her neighborhood, disappeared without a trace and thinks that the new teacher is the culprit. Elsa Fernández Campos (Natalia Millán) is pregnant with twins and discovers that she has a twin brother who is lost in the forest, but through the memories of Jacinta García Aparicio (Amparo Baró) It Is shown that a young Jacinta (Carolina Lapausa), hid him in the past to protect her life and he is the Gnome, a friend of Paula. Elsa goes to meet her brother, but gets scared when she sees him and loses the twins. Her brother takes her to the boarding school, but before arriving, the police officers shoot and kill him. Elsa reveals that Pedro was the father of the twins.

=== Third season ===
Iván killed Fermín's contact when he pointed a pistol at María. Fermín's boss thinks that Fermín de Pablo (Raúl Fernández de Pablo) has betrayed him by taking the Epiphany Triptych and has sent Nora Díez (Mariona Ribas) to El Internado, as a history teacher, to watch over him. The boys think that Hector is the culprit of everything, but they realize that this is not true when they find out that he belonged to the group of orphans who, like them, investigated what was happening there. Irene Espí (Yolanda Arestegui) tries to escape through the corridors with her baby with the help of Nora, who dies at the scene. Nora, dying, calls Fermín and tells him where Irene Espí is to be rescued. Julia sees Cayetano in the form of a ghost, he wants to tell his friends who killed him.

=== Fourth season ===
Fermín is eager to find out who his father's murderer was, since he knows that he is at boarding school. Throughout the season he realizes that his father killed three of the founders of the Gemini Project.

Iván and Julia start a romance. On the one hand, Martín Moreno (Ismael Martínez) and his son Lucas Moreno Yerena (Javier Cidoncha) arrive at the boarding school, who are fleeing since Martín escaped with his son behind the back of his wife Silvana Yerena (Lara Ruiz). And on the other hand, Toni Fernández (Alejandro Casaseca), Iván's biological father, who comes to clean the kitchen chimney and stays as a technical repairman.

=== Fifth season ===
At El Internado arrives Rebeca Benarroch (Irene Montalà), as a new history teacher, Lucía García Miranda (Lola Baldrich), as a doctor and Hugo Alonso (Javier Ríos), as a new physical education teacher. Rebeca will feel an attraction towards Martín, who looks embarrassed since she sees the darker side of someone just by touching him, and she saw him kill Don Joaquín. On the other hand, together with Fermín, he investigates the Nazism at the boarding school. In the penultimate chapter, Hugo makes himself known as one of the shareholders of the Ottox company, joining Noiret and Camilo. Two other new characters are Nacho García Vallejo (Jonás Berami), Vicky's boyfriend, and Fernando Ugarte Roldán (Adam Quintero), Amelia's brother, and according to him, "currency" of the Gemini Project, since They injected him with the virus to provide the cure only if his sister helped the project. Both Fermín and Rebeca and the boys discover a meeting room with a swastika under the hermitage. That's where the eight Nazi founders met, and where Camilo burns.

=== Sixth season ===
Lucas tells Evelyn and Paula that a wild animal usually enters the kitchen and devours all the food it catches. This is no other person than Camilo, who survived the burns and lives in the forest training wolves, to take revenge on Ottox. Jaques Noiret (Carlos Leal) discovers that his biological son that he maintains with Lucía is locked up in a place protected from the sun's rays, since he suffers from Gunther disease, he will die if the sun hits him. Furthermore, Marcos and Paula's grandfather takes advantage of the amnesia of Andrés Novoa Setien (Luis Mottola), Marcos and Paula's father, to make him believe that he was helping him with the experiments before the accident. But he does not believe and insists on removing Samuel, Marcos and Paula's little brother, and his wife Sandra Pazos (Yolanda Arestegui) from the place where they are kept. Hugo's twin brother, Apolo with whom Andrés and Sandra went to meet in Nysiros, Greece, is at El Internado and Hugo will have no choice but to confront him. On the other hand, the boys continue to ponder the subject of that one of them is a traitor, especially Carolina, who is killed by the traitor just after finding out who he is: Roque. Julia sees a ghost just like Paula, who is none other than Eva Wulf (Carlota García), Wulf's biological daughter, whom she cryogenized to cure him of the disease he contracted years ago. Buck throws a grenade into the room where Wulf prepares to heal his daughter, killing them both and destroying much of the underground. In addition, a capsule of a deadly virus has spread for the boarding school, because of Javier Holgado (Sergio Murillo).

=== Seventh season ===
The army has surrounded the boarding school with the CBRN protocol, and does not let anyone out as it is a quarantine. All end up infected and without medicines, when they discover that everything is in the hands of Ottox and that Colonel Araujo is in command of the quarantine, he is actually Karl Fleischer, one of the Nazis and founder of the Gemini project. The colonel has the help of Lieutenant Nicolás Garrido, who is infiltrating the boarding school. Four new people enter at El Internado, they are infected: Clara Sáez de Tejada (Natalia Lóz) the old dance teacher who works for Ottox, Curro Bermúdez Pereira (Eduardo Mayo) he was looking for Amaia González (Nani Jiménez) when she was infected, Javier Holgado's mother and another boy who has not yet been known. Knows nothing. Meanwhile, Hector has survived the explosion of the underground tunnels and finds himself trapped in a room. Sandra is kidnapped again by Camilo. The boys discover that the traitor is Roque, who dies at the hands of Lieutenant Garrido when he discovers that the lieutenant had murdered Lucía. Amelia finds the medicines in the tunnels, but Hugo discovers her and kills her. By not taking the medicines Elsa dies from the virus. It is discovered that Amaia is the granddaughter of Theodora Raüber, the last of the Nazi founders of the Gemini Project who was yet to appear.

In the final chapter of the series, everyone is cured of the virus with the machine that Max Levov (Santi Pons) builds, who is killed by Amaia, who dies when she tries to take Paula and Vicky hits her head with a shovel, and when she falls, she throws a syringe with some deadly material. Iván has an intense Shotokan fight with Hugo, and in the fight, Hugo catches fire and burns to death. Fermín dies in the arms of María, assassinated by Lieutenant Garrido, but his death has not been in vain since everyone leaves the boarding school with to his escape strategy. After he dies, his spirit appears to Julia and tells her to take good care of María and Iván. Finally, the military realizes that Lieutenant Garrido is with the Nazis and allows the students to cross the fence and leave the boarding school. Samuel Espí and his sister Irene Espí are finally reunited with Marcos, Paula, and little Samuel. The Nazi founders who were left alive (Colonel Araujo, Theodora Raüber, and Lieutenant Garrido) are arrested by Rebeca and the military. Vicky shows that in the future she will end up with a military man who helps them escape. The love of Iván and Julia continues. Martín and Rebeca also stay together.

=== The Boarding School: Las Cumbres ===
This reboot also works as a direct sequel since in the first chapter we are shown a sequence from a newscast where Julia Medina Jiménez (Blanca Suárez) and Iván Noiret León (Yon González) are in an interview with Sandra Sabatés talking about the book they wrote together where they tell everything that happened to them and their friends in the “Laguna Negra” and the book is dedicated to their daughter Carolina Noiret Medina who was named in honor of their old friend Carolina Leal Solis (Ana de Armas).

== Cast ==
=== Protagonists ===
- Yon González as Iván Noiret León/Iván Fernández Almagro
- Blanca Suárez as Julia Medina Jiménez
- Martiño Rivas as Marcos Novoa Pazos/Marcos Novoa Espí
- Ana de Armas as Carolina Leal Solís
- Elena Furiase as Victoria "Vicky" Martínez González
- Denisse Peña as Evelyn Pons
- Natalia Millán as Elsa Fernández Campos/Elsa von Klaus
- Luis Merlo as Héctor de la Vega/Samuel Espí Lázaro
- Marta Torné as María Almagro
- Marta Hazas as Amelia Ugarte Roldán/Amelia Henninger
- Amparo Baró as Jacinta García Aparicio
- Mariona Ribas as Nora Díez
- Carlos Leal as Jacques Noiret
- Irene Montalà as Rebeca Benaroch
- Cristina Marcos as Alicia Corral
- Nani Jiménez as Amaia González
- Fernando Tielve as Cayetano Montero Ruiz
- Daniel Retuerta as Roque Sánchez Navas
- Carlota García as Paula Novoa Pazos/Paula Novoa Espí, young Irene Espí, and Eva Wulf
- Raúl Fernández de Pablo as Fermín de Pablo/Carlos Almansa Olid
- Alejandro Botto as Mateo Tabuenca
- Alejandro Casaseca as José Antonio "Toni" Fernández
- Yolanda Arestegui as Sandra Pazos Pérez/Irene Espí Lázaro
- Luis Mottola as Andrés Novoa Setien
- Ismael Martínez as Martín Moreno/Emilio Galván Moreno
- Javier Cidoncha as Lucas Moreno Yerena/Lucas Galván Yerena
- Lola Baldrich as Lucía García Miranda/Marta Hernández Velasco
- Javier Ríos as Hugo Alonso and Daniel Alonso
- Eduardo Velasco as Pedro Camacho
- Pedro Civera as Camilo Belmonte/Helmuth von Hammer
- Iñaki Font as Lieutenant Nicolás Garrido
- Santi Pons as Max Levov
- Natalia López as Clara Sáez de Tejada
- Eduardo Mayo as Curro Bermúdez Pereira
- Sergio Murillo as Javier Holgado Alonso

=== Main cast ===
- Lolita Flores as Estela González
- Elisa Mouliaá as Alicia Campos
- Úrsula Corberó as Manuela Portillo
- Manuel de Blas as Saúl Pérez Sabán
- Chusa Barbero as Susana Saavedra
- Concha Hidalgo as Sara Olid
- Hans Richter as Guillermo García/Adolf Merkel
- Guillermo Campra as Young Samuel Espí
- Macarena García as Gema
- Paloma Bloyd as Sara
- Brendan Price as Sr. Benaroch
- Eduardo MacGregor as Joaquín Fernández/Martín von Klaus
- Francisco Merino as Alfonso Ceballos Parra
- José Luis Patiño as Mario Torres
- Carla Sánchez as Ana Solís
- Miguel Alcíbar as Ricardo Montoya
- Javier Iribarren as Pablo Fernández Campos/Pablo von Klaus
- Lucina Gil as Belinda García
- Àngels Bassas as Leticia Jiménez
- Luis Jiménez as Tomás Noiret García/Tomás Noiret Hernández
- Eduardo Espinilla as Miguel Pérez Fernández
- Fran Sariego as José Castro Massa
- Tacuara Casares Jawa as Cristina Palacios Rodríguez
- María Álvarez as Cristina Palacios Rodríguez
- Jesús Fuente as Miguel Pons
- Carlos Olall as Daniel Medina
- Pablo Castellano as Rodrigo Otero
- Inma Nieto as Gabriela Sánchez Trebijano
- Lara Ruiz as Silvana Yerena
- Teresa Lozano as Teresa Álvarez Herguedas
- Mario Martín as Arturo Álvarez Herguedas
- Adam Quintero as Fernando Ugarte Roldán/Fernando Henninger
- José Hervás as Santiago Pazos/Ritter Wulf
- Héctor Clarumunt as Young Ritter Wulf
- Jonás Beramí as Nacho García Vallejo
- Luz Valdenebro as Valentina León
- Julia Fournier as Susana del Río
- José Ángel Trigo as Rubén Bosco
- Joan Massotkleiner as Colonel Carlos Araujo/Karl Fleischer
- Elisabet Gelabert as Noelia Alonso Pastor
- Lola Cordón as Asunción Hervás/Theodora Raüber
- Carla Sánchez as Patricia Leal
- Laura Río as Sandra Pazos Pérez
- Javier García as Antonio Montero
- Victoria Seco as Alicia Campos
- Carmen García Quiros as Sara Ruiz
- Quim Ramos as Ángel Díaz Lain
- Lucía Quintana as Verónica Fernández García
- Candela Fernández as Elena Pérez Fernández
- Karmele Aranburu as Lourdes Garcia
- M Pink Christofalo as Sandra Camacho
- Eduardo March as Jimmy Beltrán
- Carmen Sánchez Lozano as Vanesa Morales
- Oriol Tarrasón as Dr. Martín Argüello
- Víctor Valdivia as Young Héctor de la Vega
- Carolina Lapausa as Young Jacinta García Aparicio
- Andrea Ros as Young María Almagro
- Cristian Bautista as Young José Antonio "Toni" Fernández
- Arturo García as Young Carlos Almansa Olid
- Cameron Antrobus as Young David Almansa
- Lowena McDonell as Young Rebeca Benaroch
- Jaime Ruiz as Young Tomás Noiret García
- Álex Quiroga as Gerardo
- Manuel Jurado as Antonio
- Damián Alcolea as Arturo
- Lucía Ramos as Irene
- Iván Martín as Antón
- Pere Ventura as Jimeno
- Saida Benzal as Silvia
- Guillermo Carbajo as Manuel
- Íñigo Navares as Víctor
- Claudia Cuenca as Claudia
- Leonardo Orna as Ruslan
- Bruno Squarcia as Márquez
- Tomás Repila as Fencing Teacher
- Ramón Radós as Sr. Cistaré
- Chema Ruiz as Psychiatrist
- Bernabé Fernández as Soldier Torres
- Julio Jordán as Fermín's Boss
- Violeta Pérez as La Mary

== International Broadcasting ==
Russia
On 11 April 2011, the Russian version was introduced on the Russian channel CTC. The Russian adaptation of the series is called "Private Education" (Russian: Закрытая школа, Transliteration: Zakrytaya shkola). The pilot names are "Интернат" ("Boarding School") and "Лес" ("Forest"). The original series was broadcast on AXN Sci Fi.

Mexico
On 25 May 2009, the series was introduced on the Mexican channel Aztecs 7. As of now, Azteca 7 has broadcast the series through the fourth season. Currently, it only airs on Antena 3 Internacionales.

Peru
The series began playing 30 May 2010 in Trujillo, and it is currently still playing.

Central Europe
The series will soon be broadcast on AXN Central Europe.

United States
The Spanish production company had been in contact with American channels and producers to adapt or co-produce an American version. In July 2015, the original series become available on Netflix.

France
A French version of El Internado called L'Internat was made for channel M6. The story took place in a college situated in a forest of the Department of l'Essonne. The series began its first season (with 10 episodes each 50 minutes long) in November 2009 and ended in December of the same year due to results beneath what was expected. It is not expected to return.

Serbia
The series is broadcast on B92. First, in 2012, it was aired on weekends at 14:30. It was cancelled after 50 episodes. From 7 January 2013, this series is airing from Monday to Friday at 13:00 and midnight. Currently, B92 is transmitting the 7th season.

Montenegro
The series was broadcast on TV Vijesti.

North Macedonia
The series began playing on 13 May 2013 on the channel Alfa TV (North Macedonia).

Portugal
The series is broadcast on SIC Radical.

Iran

The series is broadcast on Rubix HD and GEM TV. The first episode was on broadcast on 24 May 2013.

Kurdistan

The series is broadcast on GEMKURD TV.

Vietnam

The series is broadcast on VTC5.

== Series overview ==
Season	Episodes	Originally aired		DVD release date	Ratings	
Season	Episodes	Season premiere	Season finale	DVD release date	Spain viewers (millions)	Share
1	6	24 May 2007	28 June 2007	25 March 2008	4.08	23.8%
2	8	7 November 2007	2 January 2008	20 May 2008	3.61	20.2%
3	9	23 April 2008	25 June 2008	28 October 2008	3.42	20.4%
4	11	22 October 2008	15 January 2009	26 May 2009	3.89	22.0%
5	9	12 May 2009	7 July 2009	3 November 2009	3.16	18.4%
6	13	16 November 2009	1 March 2010	24 August 2010	2.93	16.5%
7	15	2 June 2010	13 October 2010	1 November 2010	3.67	19.9%

=== Season 1 (2007) ===
1. Monsters Do Not Tickle (Los monstruos no hacen cosquillas)
2. Everyone In The World Has A Secret (Todo el mundo tiene un secreto)
3. Eyes That Don’t See (Ojos que no ven)
4. A Message In A Bottle (Un mensaje en una botella)
5. A Body in the Lagoon (Un cadáver en La Laguna)
6. The Night of Saint Isabel (La noche de Santa Isabel)

=== Season 2 (2007–2008) ===
1. What Do Fish Dream about? (¿Con qué sueñan los peces?)
2. Chasing Fireflies (Persiguiendo luciérnagas)
3. The Ring (El anillo)
4. The Music Box (La caja de música)
5. In Alphabetical Order (En orden alfabético)
6. See To Believe (Ver para creer)
7. My Friend the Monster (Mi amigo el monstruo)
8. The North Pole (El polo norte)

=== Season 3 (2008) ===
1. The Owl (El Búho)
2. Eight Millimeters (Ocho Milímetros)
3. The Lead Soldier (El soldadito de plomo)
4. At the Bottom of the Ocean (En el fondo del mar)
5. Life is a Dream (La vida es un sueño)
6. The Worst Prison in the World (El peor prisión del mundo)
7. The Ghost of Beheaded Teacher (El fantasma de la profesora decapitada)
8. The Five Avengers (Los cinco vengadores)
9. Night of the Fire (La noche del fuego)

=== Season 4 (2008–09) ===
1. The Curse (La maldición)
2. The Treasury (La sala del tesoro)
3. The Best Kept Secret (El secreto mejor guardado)
4. Premonition (Premonición)
5. The Exorcism (El exorcismo)
6. Written in the Stars (Escrito en las estrellas)
7. A Good Soldier (Un gran soldado)
8. The Key (La llave)
9. The Unicorn (El unicornio)
10. A Place in the Sea (Un punto en el mar)
11. The Night of the Two Moons (La noche de las dos lunas)

=== Season 5 (2009) ===
1. Dr. Wulf's Diary (El cuaderno del doctor Wulf)
2. Amnesia (Amnesia)
3. A Man in the Bag (El hombre del saco)
4. The Corpse Bride (La novia cadáver)
5. The Promise (La promesa)
6. The Vampire (El vampiro)
7. The Card King (El rey de la baraja)
8. Paula in Wonderland (Paula en el País de las Maravillas)
9. The Last Day (El último día)

=== Season 6 (2009–10) ===
1. Monsters Come at Night (Los monstruos vienen de noche)
2. Fortune Cookies (Las galletas del porvenir)
3. The Werewolf (El hombre lobo)
4. Betrayal (La traición)
5. The Ball for the Guilty (El baile de los culpables)
6. Paula and a Wolf (Paula y el lobo)
7. The Legend of Eve (La leyenda de Eva)
8. The Ice Princess (La princesa de hielo)
9. The Alien (El extraterrestre)
10. Room №13 (La habitación numero 13)
11. The Wizard (El mago)
12. Alaska (Alaska)
13. After the Light (Después de la luz)

=== Season 7 (2010) ===
1. The Protocol (El protocolo)
2. A Threat (La amenaza)
3. The Mysterious Man (El hombre misterioso)
4. The Treasure (El tesoro)
5. The Center of the Earth (El centro de la Tierra)
6. The Three Petals (Los tres pétalos)
7. Carolina's Murderer (El asesino de Carolina)
8. The Last Wish (El último deseo)
9. The Beginning of the End (El Principio del fin)
10. The Last Dose (La última dosis)
11. The Last Memories (Los últimos recuerdos)
12. Until Death Do Us Part (Hasta que la muerte los separe)
13. The Last Breath (El último aliento)
14. The Light (La luz)
15. The End (El fin)
