= Kill Me Tender =

2003 film by Ramón de España

- Theatrical release poster
- Spanish: Haz conmigo lo que quieras
- Directed by: Ramón de España
- Written by: Ramón de España
- Produced by: Juan Alexander
- Starring: Ingrid Rubio; Alberto San Juan; Emilio Gutiérrez Caba; Manuel Manquiña; Chusa Barbero; Beatriz Segura; Josep Julien; Carmen Elías; Carles Flavià; Lola del Pino; Joan Potau; Javivi; Ágata Lys
- Cinematography: David Omedes
- Edited by: José Salcedo
- Music by: Alfonso de Villalonga
- Production company: Star Line TV
- Distributed by: Buena Vista International
- Release dates: 27 April 2003 (Málaga); 13 February 2004 (Spain)
- Country: Spain
- Language: Spanish

Kill Me Tender (Spanish: Haz conmigo lo que quieras, lit. 'Do What You Want with Me') is a 2003 Spanish comedy film written and directed by Ramón de España (in his directorial debut feature) which stars Ingrid Rubio, Alberto San Juan, Emilio Gutiérrez Caba, and Manuel Manquiña.

== Plot ==
The plot follows a love triangle between Maribel (the sister of a S&M worker), Manolo (a somewhat dumb former legion member) and Néstor (a widowed pastry chef).

== Cast ==
- Ingrid Rubio as Maribel
- Alberto San Juan as Manolo
- Emilio Gutiérrez Caba as Néstor
- Manuel Manquiña as Beni
- Chusa Barbero as Ángela
- Beatriz Segura as Nuria
- Josep Julien as Oriol
- Carmen Elías as Eutímia
- Carles Flavià as Borja
- Lola del Pino
- Ágata Lys as Pastora
- Joan Potau
- Javivi as Anselmo

== Production ==
The film is a Star Line TV production, and it had the participation of Canal Sur, TVC, Telemadrid, TVV, TVG, ETB, and Canal+. It was shot in Catalonia.

== Release ==
The film premiered at the 6th Málaga Film Festival on 27 April 2003. Distributed by Buena Vista International, it was released theatrically in Spain on 13 February 2004.

== Reception ==
Mirito Torreiro of Fotogramas rated the film 4 out of 5 stars, highlighting the chemistry between Rubio and San Juan as the best thing about the film.

Jonathan Holland of Variety deemed the film to be a "an effervescent, true-life tale of shenanigans in small-town northern Spain".

== Accolades ==
Year	Award	Category	Nominee(s)	Result	Ref.
2005	19th Goya Awards	Best New Director	Ramón de España	Nominated	

== See also ==
- List of Spanish films of 2004
