= Luis Merlo =

Spanish actor

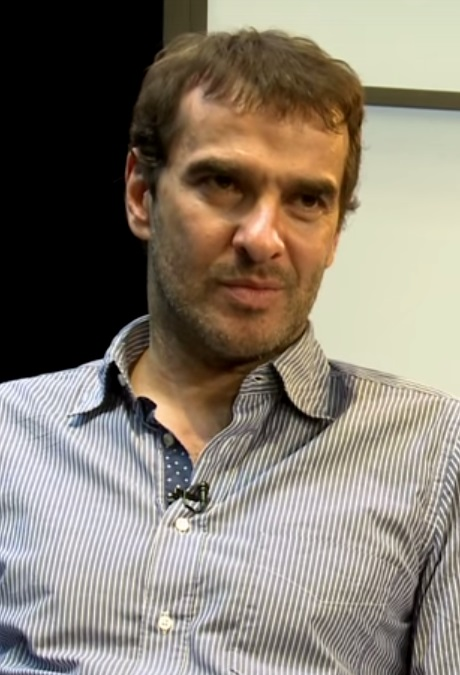
- Spanish actor
- Born: Luis María Larrañaga Merlo; June 13, 1966 (age 59); Madrid, Spain
- Occupation: Actor
- Years active: 1985–present

Luis María Larrañaga Merlo (born June 13, 1966), known as Luis Merlo, is a Spanish actor.

== Biography ==
=== Early years ===
Luis Merlo was born on June 13, 1966, in Madrid. As a child, he frequently traveled with his parents, Carlos Larrañaga and María Luisa Merlo, who were also actors, and he became accustomed to seeing them on their theatrical tours, both performing and backstage, along with his three siblings: Amparo Larrañaga, Kako Larrañaga, and Pedro Larrañaga, who is married to the actress Maribel Verdú.

Thus, as a child, Merlo regarded the art of acting as something natural. The influence of his maternal grandfather, Ismael Merlo, who took care of him after the divorce of his parents, reinforced this idea. The fact that, in his early years, he released an album for young children, confirmed his interest in the arts.

As a young man, Merlo took dance classes for a year, after which he studied a degree in drama. When Merlo had finished his studies, Mario Gas gave him his very first acting role in a version of Salomé, produced by the Núria Espert company in 1985.

=== Career ===
In 1986, Merlo made his cinematic debut with Hay que deshacer la casa, in which he played a young boy who sexually molested an old woman, a role played by his aunt, Amparo Rivelles. He finished that year touring with La última luna menguante, directed by Manuel Collado, with whom he also did the play Séneca, o el beneficio de la duda in 1987, starring José Luis Pellicena. Soon afterwards, he had his first starring role in a movie, La señora, in which he played a bellboy in a hotel.

Apart from cinema, he has been a regular face on Spanish television, with notable roles in Aquí no hay quien viva, Hospital Central and El Internado. In 2016, he made his debut in La que se avecina, reuniting with many of his former colleagues from Aquí no hay quien viva.

== Filmography ==
=== Television ===
Series de Televisión
Year	Title	Role	Episodes	Channel
1986	Turno de oficio	Esteban	1 Episodio	La 2
1989	El olivar de Atocha	Ramón	2 episodes	La 1
1994	Compuesta y sin novio	Juanjo	13 episodes	Antena 3
1994–1997	Canguros	Micky	3 episodes	Antena 3
1994	Los ladrones van a la oficina	Señor	1 Episodio	Antena 3
1996	Función de noche	Canigula	1 Episodio	
1997	La casa de los líos	Nacho	3 episodes	Antena 3
1998	Señor alcalde	Dani Herrera	18 episodes	Telecinco
1998–1999	Una de dos	Guillermo III	19 episodes	Telefe
2000–2001	Abierto 24 horas	Polo	32 episodes	Antena 3
2001	7 vidas	Mateo	1 Episodio	Telecinco
2001	Hospital Central	Anibal González de Lando	1 Episodio	Telecinco
2003–2006	Aquí no hay quien viva	Mauricio "Mauri" Hidalgo Torres	91 episodes	Antena 3
2003	London Street	Adolfo	4 episodes	Antena 3
2008–2009	Lo que surja	Sr. Gimeno	2 episodes	Internet
2007–2010	El internado	Héctor de la Vega	52 episodes	Antena 3
2016–	La que se avecina	Bruno Quiroga	7 episodes	Telecinco
