= Mariam Hernández =

Spanish actress (born 1981)

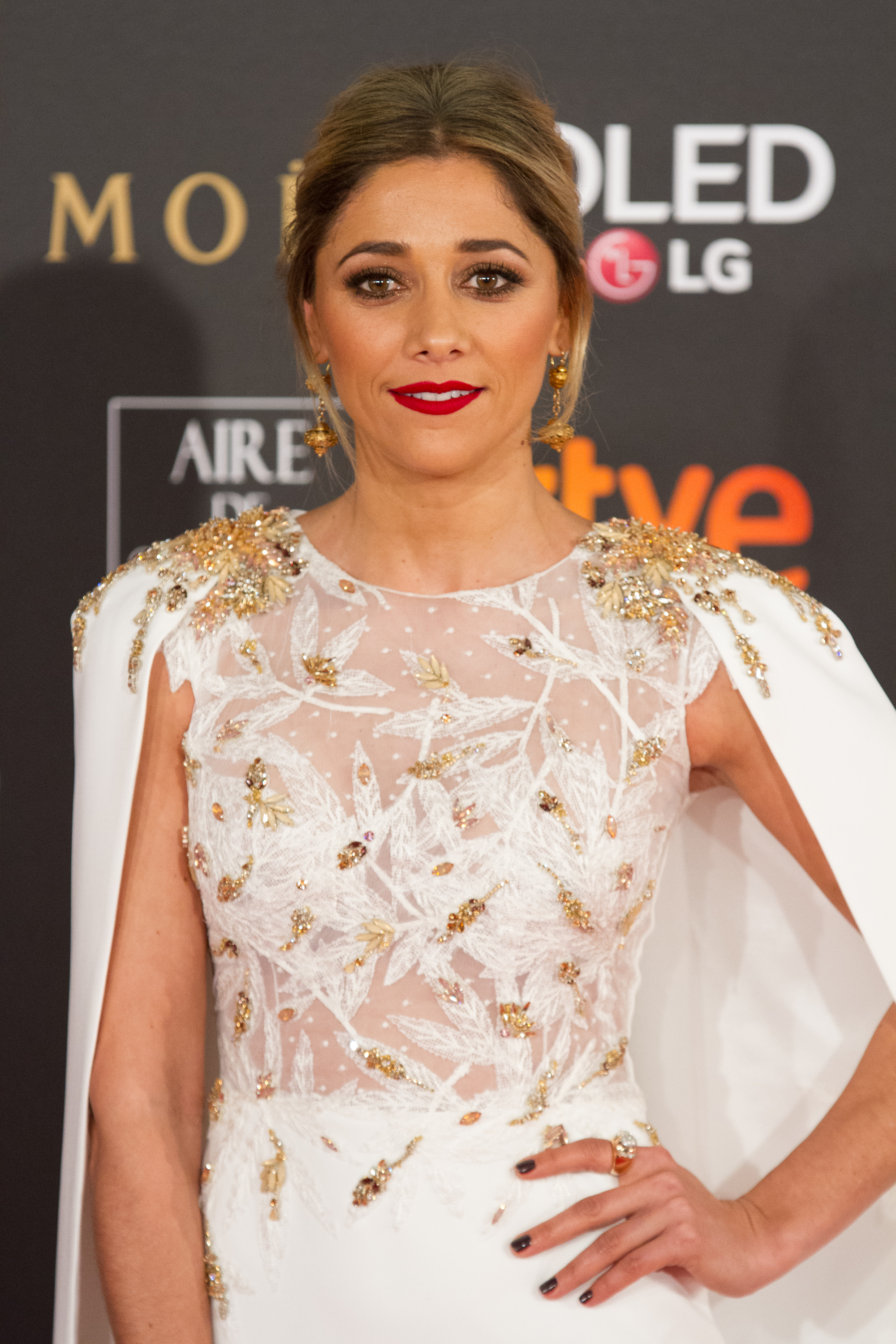
- Mariam Hernández in 2018
- Born: 25 April 1981 (age 45); Fuerteventura, Spain
- Occupation: Actress

Mariam Hernández (Fuerteventura, Las Palmas, April 25, 1981) is a Spanish actress.

== Biography ==
In 1999, aged 18 years, she left Fuerteventura to move to Madrid to study audiovisual communication.

She worked in the series Cuestión de sexo, playing Paloma, Elena's sister (Carmen Ruiz). In this series, she participates with Alejandro Tous, who plays Mario in the series, and Elena's gynecologist. After three seasons, the series was cancelled due to low ratings.

Previously, she worked in the series La tira as a cashier in a supermarket. She attended cashier number 01, along with "La Yoli" (Esther Rivas) and Manolo (Diego Paris).

From November 2012 to February 2013, she played Daniela Marcos in Fenómenos on Antena 3.

From 2014 to 2016, she played Nieves in Gym Tony on Cuatro. She currently plays Henar Pacheco in Amar es para siempre on Antena 3.

In 2019, the film ¿Qué te juegas?, will be released, in which she shares the lead role with Amaia Salamanca and Javier Rey, among others.

She announces her pregnancy with her first child in the summer of 2019.

== Filmography ==
=== Television ===
Year	Title	Channel	Character	Episodes
2006	El comisario	Telecinco		1 episode
2008	Los hombres de Paco	Antena 3		1 episode
2008 – 2009	La tira	La Sexta	Jessica "Jessy" Martínez	
2008	Impares	Antena 3		1 episode
2009	Cuestión de sexo	Cuatro	Paloma	10 episodes
2009	Bicho malo (nunca muere)	Neox		2 episodes
2010	Tierra de lobos	Telecinco	Jimena	1 episode
2011	Plaza de España	La 1	Remedios	12 episodes
2011	BuenAgente	La Sexta		1 episode
2012 – 2013	Fenómenos	Antena 3	Daniela Marcos	9 episodes
2013	Gran Reserva	La 1	Ana	8 episodes
2014 – 2016	Gym Tony	Cuatro	Nieves López Gómez	373 episodes
2015	Aquí Paz y después Gloria	Telecinco	Pilar	1 episode
2016	Cuatro estaciones en La Habana	Netflix	Lisette	1 episode
2016 – 2017	Amar es para siempre	Antena 3	Henar Pacheco Bravo	256 episodes
2019	Antes de perder	Playz	Jana	7 episodes
2021	Besos al aire	Telecinco	Luisa	2 episodes

== Awards and nominations ==
2012

- Winner of the Best Actress Award at the IX Comedy Film Festival of Tarazona and Moncayo "Paco Martínez Soria" for Curvas.
- Winner of the Best Actress Award at the Dieciminuti Film Festival in Italy for Curvas.
- Nominated for Best Actress at the International Short Film Festival of Valencia "Cortos en off" for Curvas.
- Nominated as Best Actress at the V Festival de Cortos Villamayor de Cine for Curvas.
- Nominated as Best Actress at the Houston Comedy Film Festival for Push Up.

2014

- Nominated for Best Actress at the Flager Film Festival for Runner (Florida, USA).
- Nominated for Best Actress at the Houston Comedy Film Festival for Runner.
- Nominated as Newcomer Actress at the Goya Festival (appearing in the first list of 50 selected).

2019

- Winner of the Best Acting Award at the Castilla y León International Film Festival for her role in the short film Amandine.
