= Natalia Millán =

Spanish actress

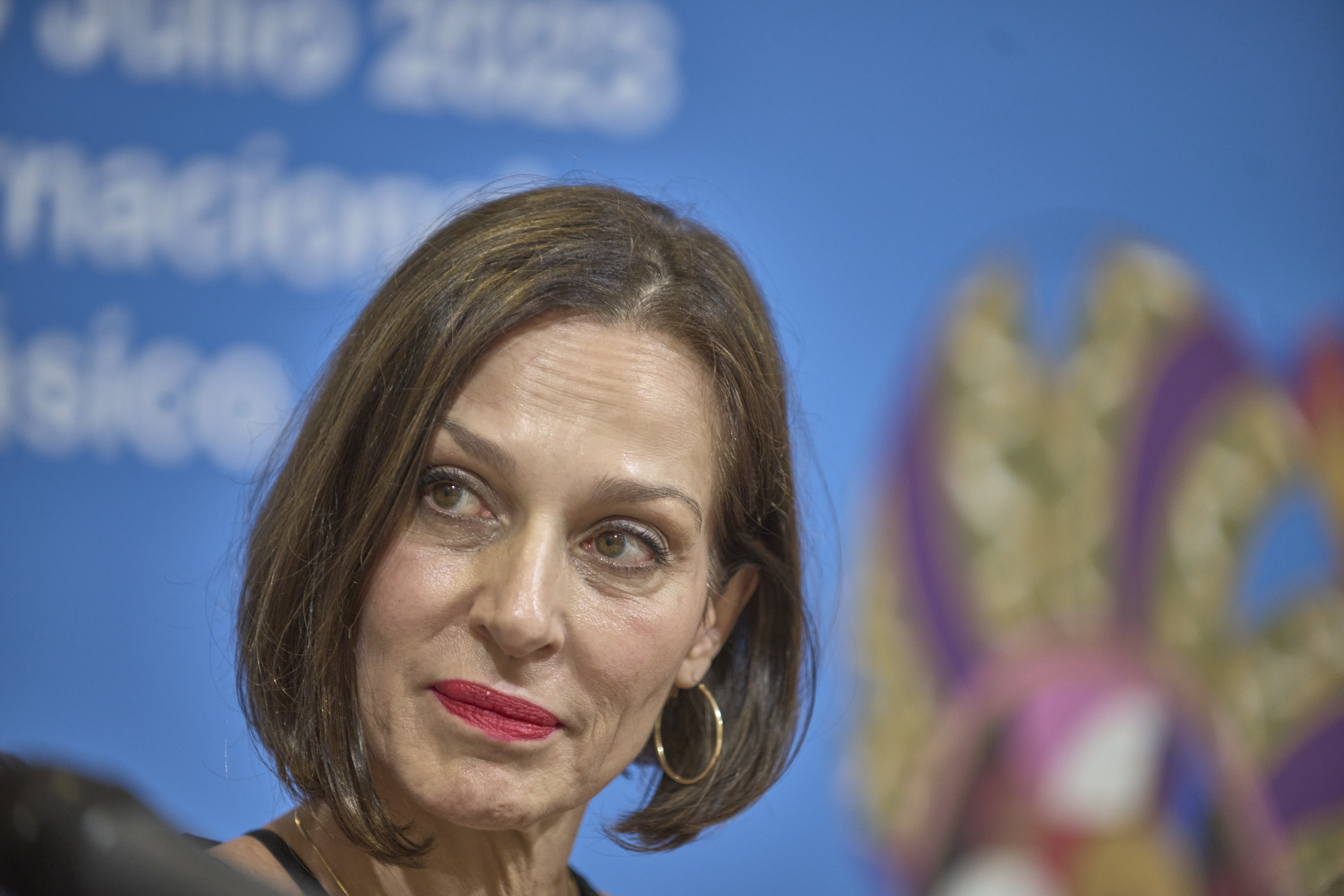
- Millán in 2023
- Born: 27 November 1969 (age 55); Madrid, Spain
- Occupations: Actress; dancer; singer

Natalia Millán (born 27 November 1969) is a Spanish actress, dancer and singer.

== Life and career ==
Born in Madrid on 27 November 1969, Millán began studying at the Taller de Escuelas Imaginarias (Escuela TAI) at age 16, receiving singing lessons, jazz, interpretation and classic dance.

She worked for a brief period as a professional singer. When she was 18 years old she entered Escuela de Ballet Nacional Español, where she studied with Aurora Pons and Victoria Eugenia, and received instruction from Carmen Roque, and body expression with Arnold Taraborrelli and Agustín Bellús. She also received singing lessons at Escuela de Música Creativa and Escuela Popular de Música, working under choreographers Carmen Senra and Denisis Perdikidis, with her first performances on musicals Jesus Christ Superstar and My Fair Lady. She performed with Compañía de Tetro de la Danza in La pasión de Drácula, Al fin...Solos, Hazme de la noche un cuento by Jorge Márquez, Mata-Hari and La Reina del Nilo. With Compañía Nacional de Teatro Clásico she performed principal roles in La gran sultana and Fuente Ovejuna. She appeared in the film El Cepo in 1982, playing a character named as herself.

In 1986 for TVE she worked on El domingo es nuestro, and A Mi Manera with Jesús Hermida and Innocente Innocente. In 1987 she worked with Luis Eduardo Aute singing the poem "Tengo sed" and as a chorist with songs including "Idiosincrasia". She participated as a dancer and singer in 1996 with Pilar Miró's film Tu nombre envenena mis sueños. She appeared in El Súper – Historias de todos los días from 1996 to 1999. She was subsequently hired by Antena 3 for the TV series Policías, en el corazón de la calle.

In 2003, she took the main role in the film Nubes de Verano, released in Spanish cinemas in 2004. In 2003 she performed as Sally Bowles in the musical Cabaret. In 2005 she got a role in the film Regreso a Moira by Mateo Gil. After three seasons in Cabaret at the Nuevo Teatro Alcalá in Madrid, in 2006 Natalia was hired for the film Mi último verano con Mariam directed by Vicente Monsonís. Since 2007, she has played Elsa in El Internado, a series by Antena 3. At the beginning of 2008, she participated as a judge in Tienes Talento by Cuatro, a Spanish version of Britain's Got Talent.

In May, she performed in the musical El Mercader de Venecia, directed by Denis Rafter, playing Porcia. She also appeared in the film Sangre de Mayo by José Luis Garci. She was the protagonist in the Broadway musical Chicago, in the role of Velma Kelly.

== Filmography ==
- El cepo (1982)
- Fiebre de danza (1984)
- No hagas planes con Marga (1988)
- Tu nombre envenena mis sueños (1996)
- El tiempo perdido (1997)
- Salvaje (2002)
- Atraco a las 3... y media (2003)
- Nubes de verano (2004)
- Mi último verano con Marián (2007)
- Sangre de mayo (2008)
- My Heart Goes Boom! (2020)

== Television roles ==
Fixed roles

- Un, Dos, Tres (2002-2005)
- El súper (1996–1999)
- Policías, en el corazón de la calle (2000–2001)
- Un paso adelante (2002–2003)
- Películas para no dormir: Regreso a Moira (2006), by Mateo Gil.
- El internado (2007)
- Velvet (2014–2016)

Episodic roles

- El comisario (2000)
- Siete vidas (2001)
- Agente 700 (2001)

== Theatre ==
- 1986 – La reina del nilo
- 1990 – La pasión de Drácula
- 1991 – Hazme de la noche un cuento
- 1992 – Al fin... Solos (obra teatral – Madre Amparo – 1992...1993) – La gran sultana
- 1993 – Fuente Ovejuna
- 1999 – La última aventura
- 2001 – La Música ) – El Cementerio de Automóviles – Lectura del monologo
- 2003 – Cabaret
- 2006 – La Magia de Broadway
- 2008 – El Mercader de Venecia
- 2009 – Chicago
- 2022-2023 - Los chicos del coro (Musical)

== Prizes and nominations ==
- 2005 - Winner: Turia's Prize, Best actress (Nubes de verano)
- 2003 - Nominated: Silver Frames, Best theatre actress (Cabaret)
- 2008 - Teatro de Rojas' Prize, Best female performance
- 2009 - Públic TV Prize, Best drama protagonist actress
