= Mónica Estarreado =

Spanish actress

Mónica Estarreado (born 29 June 1975, in Madrid, Spain) is a Spanish actress. She is best known for her role as Cayetana de la Vega on the popular Spanish comedy-drama Yo soy Bea and for her current role as Dr. Valeria Peralta on Hospital Central, as well as for her work as Fatima Mansour in La Reina del Sur, the latter of which made her known in the United States, Mexico, Puerto Rico, Serbia, Chile and other countries.

== Personal life ==
On 28 September 2007, she married Luis Arribas, an assistant director on Yo soy Bea. In February 2011, it was announced they are expecting their first child. In July, she gave birth to a baby girl.

== Filmography ==
=== Film ===
- Palace (1996)
- Año cero (2001)
- Al alcance de su mano (2002)
- En la ciudad sin límites (2002)
- Más de mil cámaras velan por tu seguridad (2003)
- Válido para un baile (2006)

=== Television ===
- El súper (1996-1999) as Leticia Torres
- Calle nueva (1999-2000)
- Al salir de clase (2000) as Bárbara
- Paraíso (2000)
- La verdad de Laura (2001-2002) as Laura Alonso
- De moda (2004)
- Siete vidas (2005)
- A tortas con la vida (2005)
- El comisario (2006)
- Yo soy Bea (2006-2008) as Cayetana de la Vega
- Hospital Central (2009-2011) as Valeria Peralta
- La Reina del Sur (2011) as Fátima Mansour
- Aquí Paz y después Gloria (2015) as Paz.
