= Antonio Zabálburu =

Spanish actor

- Born: Antonio Zabálburu; 19 July 1973 (age 52); Bilbao, Spain
- Occupation: actor
- Years active: 1996-present
- Website: Website

Antonio Zabálburu (born 19 July 1973 in Bilbao) is a Spanish actor. He is currently part of the cast of Hospital Central.

== Television (selected) ==
- Compañeros (1998)
- Hospital Central (2000 - )

== Film (selected) ==
- Sabor latino (1996), directed by Pedro Carvajal
- África (1996), directed by Alfonso Ungría
- La marcha verde (2002), directed by José Luis García Sánchez
- Eres mi heroe (2003), directed by Antonio Cuadri
- Campos de luz (2004), directed by María Casal
- Vete de mi (2006), directed by Víctor García León
