= Hierro (film) =

- Theatrical release poster
- Directed by: Gabe Ibáñez
- Written by: Javier Gullón
- Produced by: Álvaro Augustin; Jesús de la Vega
- Starring: Elena Anaya; Bea Segura; Mar Sodupe; Andrés Herrera; Miriam Correa
- Cinematography: Alejandro Martínez
- Edited by: Enric Garcia i Vilà
- Music by: Zacarías M. de la Riva
- Production companies: Telecinco Cinema; Madrugada Films
- Distributed by: Paramount Pictures
- Release dates: 18 May 2009 (Cannes); 15 January 2010 (Spain)
- Running time: 91 minutes
- Country: Spain
- Language: Spanish

Hierro is a 2009 psychological thriller film directed by Gabe Ibáñez and written by Javier Gullón. It stars Elena Anaya.

== Plot ==
Six months after her young son Diego mysteriously disappears while travelling by ferry to the island of El Hierro, Maria is finally overcoming the pain of her loss. However, a phone call notifying her of the discovery of a child's body on the island forces her to go back to the island. Her return to the sinister island full of malevolent characters marks the beginning of a nightmarish journey where she learns that "some mysteries should never be revealed".

== Cast ==
- Elena Anaya as María
- Hugo Arbues as Mateo
- Jon Ariño as Forense
- Miriam Correa as Julia
- Tomás del Estal
- Andrés Herrera as Antonio
- Javier Mejía as Matias
- Kaiet Rodriguez as Diego
- Raquel Salvador as Elena
- Bea Segura as Laura
- Mar Sodupe as Tania

== Production ==
The film is from the producers of Pan's Labyrinth and The Orphanage, it was directed by short film director Gabe Ibáñez, who shot his film of the Canary Islands in El Hierro, Gran Canaria and Madrid.

== Release ==
The Director Ibáñez's first feature premiered on 2 October 2009 at Sitges 42nd Fantastic Film International Festival and had an appearance at the 2009 Cannes Film Festival in the critic's week category, it runs of several film Festivals includes UK FrightFest 2009.

== See also ==
- List of Spanish films of 2010
