= Bea Segura =

Spanish actress

- Born: Beatriz Segura Folch; 22 March 1975 (age 50); Barcelona, Spain
- Years active: 1994–present

Beatriz "Bea" Segura Folch (born 22 March 1975) is a Spanish actress.

== Filmography ==
Year	Title	Format	Role	Notes
1994	Transeúntes	Film	Cameo	
1994	Estació d'enllaç	TV series		
1995	Laia, el regal d'aniversari	TV film	Susi	
1996	B	Film	B's Girlfriend	
1996	Nissaga de poder	TV series		
1997	Primates	Film	Susi	
1999	Homenots	TV series		
2000—01	El cor de la ciutat	TV series	Laura Peris	
2000—02	Al salir del clase	TV series	Claudia Salas	
2001	Desde la ciudad no se ven las estrellas	Film	Lucía	
2001	Dama de Porto Pim	Film	María	
2002—05	El comisario	TV series	Arauco/Aurora Ramos	
2002	Lola, vende ca	Film	Cristina	
2003	L'escala de diamants	TV film	Olga	
2003	Haz conmigo lo que quieras	Film	Nuria	
2003	7 vidas	TV series	Rocío	
2003	El tránsfuga	TV film	María José Reina	
2004	Virginia, la monaca di Monza	TV film	Clara	
2004	Los 80	TV series	Lara	
2005	Contratiempos	Film	Mujer Zapatería	
2005	Comme sur des roulettes	TV film	Lucia	
2005	Más que hermanos	TV film	Rosa	
2006	Salvador (Puig Antich)	Film	Montse Puig	
2006	Los Serrano	TV series	Gloria	
2006	Los ladrones somos gente honrada	TV film	Herminia	
2006	Skizo	Film	Susana	
2006—08	Hospital Central	TV series	Mónica de la Fuente	
2008	Serrallonga	TV series	Flor	
2009	Aviones	Film		
2009	Hierro	Film	Laura	
2009	Los exitosos Pells	TV series	Sol Echagüe	
2012	Insensibles	Film	Magdalena	
