= Rottweiler (film) =

- Theatrical release poster
- Directed by: Brian Yuzna
- Screenplay by: Miguel Tejada-Flores
- Story by: Alberto Vázquez Figueroa
- Produced by: Julio Fernández; Brian Yuzna
- Starring: William Miller; Irene Montalà; Paulina Gálvez; Paul Naschy
- Cinematography: Javier Salmones
- Edited by: Andy Horvitch
- Music by: Mark Thomas
- Distributed by: Castelao Producciones; Lionsgate (United States)
- Release dates: December 2004 (Sitges); 10 June 2005 (Spain)
- Running time: 95 minutes
- Countries: Spain; United Kingdom
- Language: English
- Budget: $5 million

Rottweiler is a 2004 science fiction horror film directed by Brian Yuzna and starring William Miller, Irene Montalà, Paulina Gálvez, and Paul Naschy.

== Plot ==
In the near future (2018), a prisoner named Dante (William Miller) who had been arrested for illegally entering Spain as a stowaway on a boat. After killing a prison guard, he is hunted by the prison's monstrous Rottweiler police dog, which sadistic prison warden Kufard (Paul Naschy) had revived and cybernetically enhanced after a fatal injury. Believing his Spanish girlfriend Ula (Irene Montalà) was sent to work as a prostitute in Puerto Angel as punishment, Dante looks for her, but is exhausted by the chase and wounded by the Rottweiler. As a result, he starts having hallucinations and being haunted by the repressed memories of his and Ula's arrest by the police.

While on the run, Dante comes across a small farm owned by a young woman named Alyah who trains a shotgun on him while being accompanied by a little girl. Holding Dante up at gunpoint she coerces him into her house. There, she asks for his identity to which he says his name is Dante. Alyah then ushers him into her bedroom where she strips him naked and asks if he escaped from the prison to which Dante confirms. When she further asks why is he in Kufard's prison, Dante explains that he was on a boat from Rabat but had no papers that would have allowed him to travel from there legally. He tells her that he is not going to hurt her, that he never hurt anybody and that he just needs help. Alyah pulls a knife out of the drawer after setting the shotgun down. Alyah then cleans the dog-bite wound on the back of Dante's leg.

Now held at knifepoint, Dante goes on to explain that he has to get to Puerto Angel as he needs to find someone. Alyah tells Dante that when her husband comes home it will be bad for him but that she can help him and that she knows someone who can take care of him. Alyah pushes Dante onto the bed and removes her headscarf and unfastens her dress. She says to him that since he is here without papers he does not have much of a future. Alyan pulls off her dress and climbs on top of him while telling him that if you are pretty you belong to everyone who can pay and that it changes you as you might even like it. Alyah then kisses Dante and they start to have sex. When Dante protests saying that he needs her to help him she says that she does not like men and could kill him no problem. She further explains that in Puerto Angel she was a prostitute under the employ of Kufard and that she was drugged most of the time; thus her dislike of men. Alyah then says that her daughter, the little girl who was with her, came into her life and she named her Esperanza (after the Spanish word for "hope") as she is her hope.

Esperanza, having seen the Rottweiler, runs to tell Alyah but is told to get out. As Alyah continues to have sex with Dante she tells him that one of her regular clients, Santiago, was a priest who had a weakness for her. After sleeping together they never touched each other again and so instead they prayed. While this has been going on Esperanza has seen the Rottweiler kill the farm's dogs. She goes to tell Alyah again but her warnings are once again dismissed. Alyah informs Dante that she always stays on the farm for Esperanza so she will have a place to stay and will not be like her. Esperanza locks the door to keep the Rottweiler from entering then calls for Alyah. Alyah runs into the living room and blasts the Rottweiler with the shotgun. This fails to kill it, and it destroys the shotgun when Dante tries to shoot it. The Rottweiler chases the trio through the house and despite Dante's efforts to distract the dog it chases down and kills Alyah when she locks Esperanza in a food-storage cellar in the yard.

Dante takes the terrified girl out of the cellar but then the Rottweiler comes after them. Dante traps it in the cellar, but the dog escapes. The two then sneak aboard a truck but the dog pursues it, eventually landing on top of it. The noise attracts the attention of one of the drivers and she is killed when she goes to inspect it. Realizing the danger Esperanza is in as long as he is with her Dante flees the semi trailer with the Rottweiler in pursuit and the scared but safe Esperanza is found by the other driver. As he reaches Puerto Angel and cannot find Ula at the brothel, he finally remembers that she got killed when Kufard let his dog loose on her, which led Dante to beat the dog to near death with a pipe, which was then turned into a cyborg. Kufard arrives in a helicopter, which crashes without killing him. Dante kills Kufard after a fierce struggle. The Rottweiler catches up to Dante, and they fight among the burning remains of the helicopter crash. The morning after, firefighters find the skeletons of Dante, Ula, and the Rottweiler on the beach.

== Cast ==
- William Miller as Dante
- Irene Montalà as Ula
- Paulina Gálvez as Alyah
- Cornell John as Dongoro
- Lluís Homar as Guard Borg
- Paul Naschy as Warden Kufard
- Ivana Baquero as Esperanza

== Critical reception ==
Allmovie called the film "a killer cyborg dog flick that's filled with more sleeping pills than chilling thrills" and "an obvious misstep for Yuzna, whose past successes are fastly fading in time. Do yourself a favor and leave this dog bone of a mess alone – you'll be happy that you did."
