= Go Away from Me =

- Theatrical release poster
- Spanish: Vete de mí
- Directed by: Víctor García León
- Screenplay by: Víctor García León; Jonás Trueba
- Produced by: Juan Gona
- Starring: Juan Diego; Juan Diego Botto; Cristina Plazas; Rosa María Sardá; Esperanza Roy; José Sazatornil "Saza"
- Cinematography: Mischa Lluch
- Edited by: Buster Franco
- Music by: David San José
- Production company: Gona Cine y TV
- Distributed by: United International Pictures
- Release dates: September 2006 (San Sebastián); 29 September 2006 (Spain)
- Country: Spain

Go Away from Me (Spanish: Vete de mí) is a 2006 Spanish film directed by Víctor García León which stars Juan Diego and Juan Diego Botto alongside Cristina Plazas, Rosa María Sardá, Esperanza Roy and José Sazatornil. It was produced by Juan Gona. García León co-wrote the screenplay with Jonás Trueba. The film received two Goya Award nominations, winning one award (Best Actor).

== Plot ==
The plot follows the dysfunctional relationship between two markedly selfish individuals, Santiago (an aging thespian) and Guillermo (the former's freeloading son).

== Cast ==
- Juan Diego as Santiago
- Juan Diego Botto as Guillermo
- Cristina Plazas as Ana
- Esperanza Roy as Esperanza
- Rosa María Sardá as Julia
- Ana María Vidal as Eugenia
- José Sazatornil as Quique
- Antonio Zabálburu as Carlos
- Blanca Jara as Lara
- Ángela Cremonte as Irene
- Iratxe Elorriaga as Manuela

== Production ==
A Gona Cine y TV production, the film was shot in Madrid, even if most of the production crew was from Asturias.

== Release ==
The film screened at the 54th San Sebastián International Film Festival in September 2006. Soon after, on 29 September, it opened in Spanish theatres.

== Reception ==
Deborah Young of Variety presented the film (a "bitter satire") as "a surprisingly classical piece of filmmaking boasting solidity, but little edge", assessing it to be "entertaining, occasionally poignant".

Mirito Torreiro of Fotogramas gave the film 4 out of 5 stars, drawing out the acting duel between the two Juan Diegos as the best thing about the film.

== Accolades ==
Year	Award	Category	Nominee(s)	Result	Ref.
2006	54th San Sebastián International Film Festival	Silver Shell for Best Actor	Juan Diego	Won	
2007	CEC Medals	Best Actor	Juan Diego	Nominated	
2007	21st Goya Awards	Best Actor	Juan Diego	Won	
2007	21st Goya Awards	Best Supporting Actor	Juan Diego Botto	Nominated	
2007	16th Actors and Actresses Union Awards	Best Film Actor in a Leading Role	Juan Diego	Won	
2007	16th Actors and Actresses Union Awards	Best Film Actor in a Secondary Role	Juan Diego Botto	Nominated	

== See also ==
- List of Spanish films of 2006
