= Javier Gullón =

Spanish screenwriter (born 1975)

- Born: 1975 (age 50–51); Logroño, Spain
- Occupation: Screenwriter
- Spouse: Ayako Fujitani

Javier Gullón (born 1975) is a Spanish screenwriter.

== Biography ==
Javier Gullón was born in Logroño in 1975.

He garnered a Canadian Screen Award nomination for Best Adapted Screenplay at the 2nd Canadian Screen Awards for Enemy, and two Goya Award nominations for Best Adapted Screenplay at the 27th Goya Awards for Invader, and at the 34th Goya Awards for Advantages of Travelling by Train.

His other films have included King of the Hill, Hierro, Out of the Dark, Aftermath, and Rainbow.

He is married to Ayako Fujitani.
