= Plaza de España (TV series) =

- Genre: Comedy
- Starring: Gorka Otxoa; César Camino; Eduardo Antuña; Miguel Rellán; Mariam Hernández; Javivi
- Country of origin: Spain
- Original language: Spanish
- No. of seasons: 1
- No. of episodes: 18

Production
- Camera setup: Multi-camera
- Production company: RTVE

Original release
- Network: La 1
- Release: 25 July – 29 August 2011

Plaza de España is a Spanish comedy television series broadcast on La 1 of Televisión Española from July to August 2011.

== Plot ==
The Spanish Civil War has come to the people of Peñaseca and the inhabitants have to choose a side and survive the difficult situation. The Civil War sitcom assumes a prism of sitcom through Plaza de España.

== Cast ==
- Gorka Otxoa as Sebastián Rivera
- César Camino as Tiberio
- Eduardo Antuña as Augusto
- Miguel Rellán as Don Benito
- Mariam Hernández as Remedios
- Carmen Esteban as Vicenta
- Janfri Topera as Severiano
- Goizalde Núñez as Antonia
- Alfonso Lara as Pacorro
- Javivi as Melitón
- Enrique Villén as Serafín Guisado
- Ramón Alex
- Fernando Asmen as Marquis
- Guillermo Quever as Pastor
