= Laura Pamplona =

Spanish actress

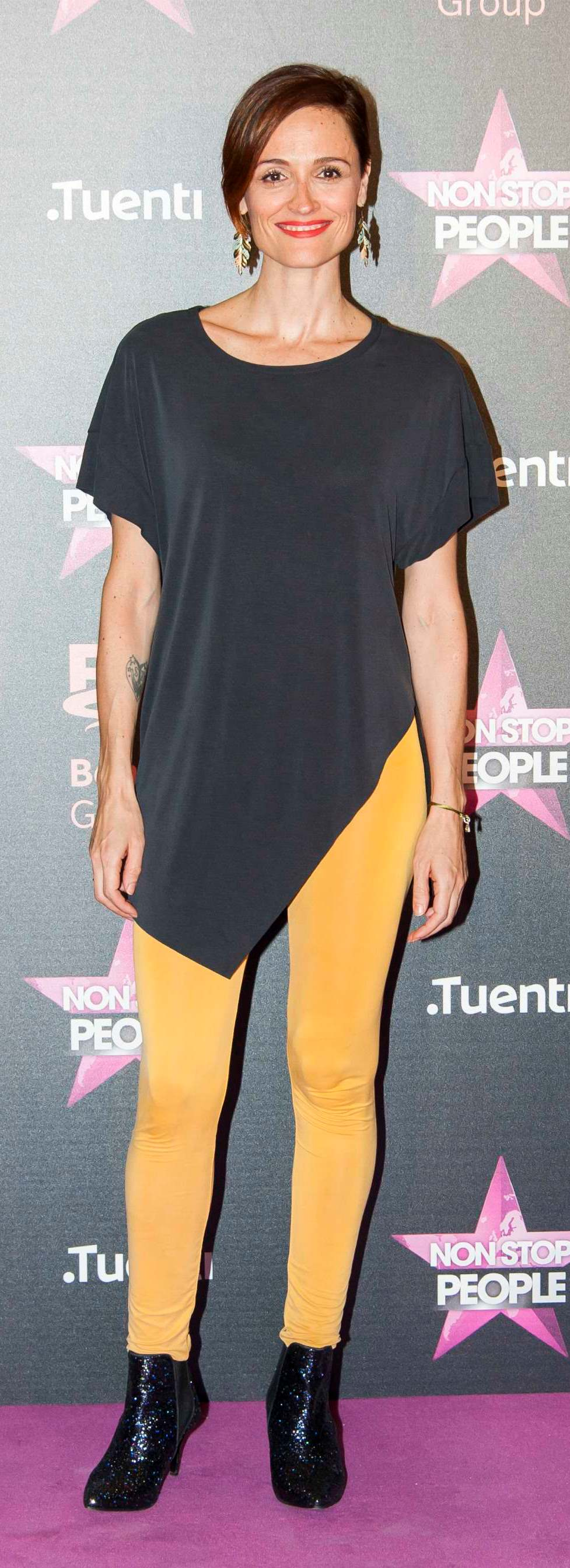
Pamplona in 2015

Laura Gonsalves Pamplona (born 7 September 1973 in Alicante) is a Spanish actress, best known for her roles in the television series Todos los hombres sois iguales (1996–1998), Policías, en el corazón de la calle (2000–2003), and Los misterios de Laura (2009–2014).

== Biography ==
She is the daughter of actress Amparo Pamplona and granddaughter of screenwriter and Journalist Clemente Pamplona. Her family life was tragically affected by the death of her sister Aitana, aged just ten, in a fire at the family home on July 4, 1989.

Although she studied Design, Laura Pamplona soon began her career in acting.

His career has been closely linked to television, where he has been part of the cast of several successful series. The first was Todos los hombres sois iguales (TV series) (All Men Are the Same), and since then, his performances in Policías, en el corazón de la calle (Cops, in the Heart of the Street) and, especially, Aquí no hay quien viva (Nobody Lives Here), where he has played very different roles, are particularly noteworthy.

In 2006, he appeared in several episodes of Hospital Central, and in 2007, he starred in Juan Taratuto's film ¿Quién dice que es fácil? Two years later, he joined the cast of the series Los misterios de Laura, remaining in the cast for all three seasons.

He also has theater experience and has worked in the worlds of fashion and advertising.

In 2022, she will reprise her role as Lydia Fernández in Laura y sus misterios, a series of television films that is the sequel to Los misterios de Laura.

In 2023, it is announced that it is part of Movistar Plus+ Una familia absolutamente normal (An Absolutely Normal Family).
