= Irene Montalà =

Spanish actress (born 1976)

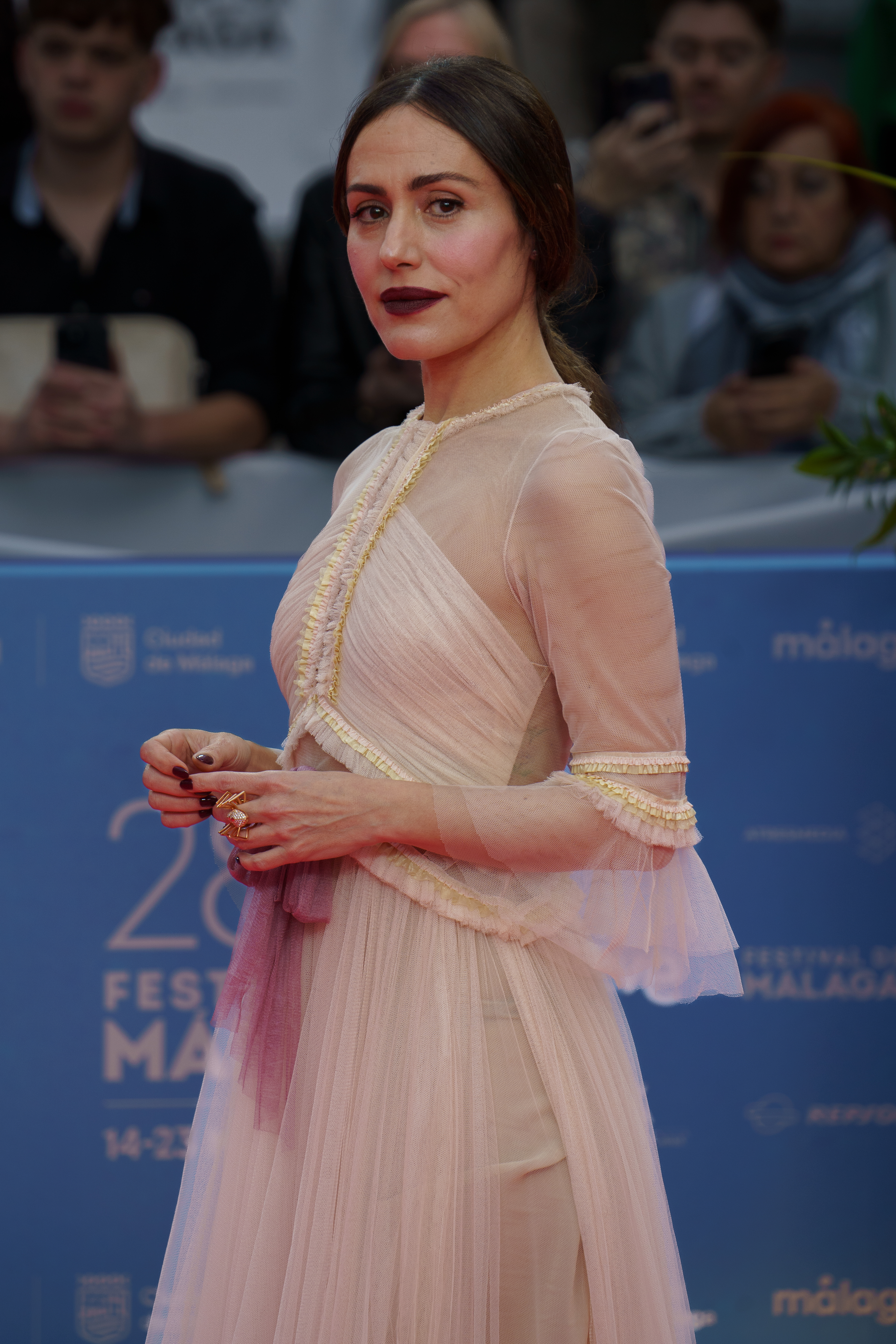
- Montalà in 2025
- Born: 18 June 1976 (age 48); Barcelona, Spain
- Occupations: Model; actress; television presenter
- Height: 1.65 m (5 ft 5 in)
- Children: 1

Irene Montalà (born 18 June 1976) is a Spanish actress born in the district of Nou Barris of Barcelona. She is the daughter of Mercè Montalà. She studied interpretation with Txiki Berrando and Manuel Lillo. She has also studied dancing and singing. Her mother tongues are Spanish and Catalan, although she has also studied English and French. She started as an actress in series Poblenou (TV3). In 2001, she starred in the film Fausto 5.0. In 2002, she participated in the series ''Por Palabras'' like Barbara which in the end it wasn't finished. In 2004 she appeared in an episodic way in the series Cuéntame como pasó (La 1), where she played the role of Mila. Three years later she returned to television in the series Telecinco Cientific RIS, which wasn't renewed because of the public indexes. In 2008, she played Monica in Herederos, on La 1, a successful series on the public channel, in which she starred alongside well-known actors like:: Concha Velasco or Carme Elías. These are only a few of the series in which she has participated. The list also includes: Mirall trencat (TV3 – 2002), where she played the role of Sofia, the daughter of the protagonist and Mar de Fons (TV3 – 2006/2007), where she played the role of Judit, the "evil" of the series among others.

Where Irene became famous was in El Internado, a successful mystery series on Antena 3, during 2009. She played the role of Rebeca, a teacher that in the beginning seemed a calm person, but in fact she was a nazi fighter. Her role, actions, and movements were centered on a beautiful relationship with Martin (Ismael Martínez, who had also participated in Cientific RIS). In 2010, the series ended an thus her role finished.

Apart from taking part in TV series, she has also acted in multiple films. Some of the films include: La mujer del anarquista, Body Armour, Andalucía, Todo está en el aire, Tu vida en 65, A ras de suelo, Rottweiler, Nubes de verano, Lo mejor que le puede pasar a un cruasán, Una casa de locos or Fausto 5.0. She has also worked in theater plays including Primera plana, Fedra, Lulú or El Criat.

Her extended career as an actress was recognised in 2004 with the "Cartelera Turia a la Actriz Revelación" award for Nubes de verano. From 2010 to 2013 she was a main character in the series El Barco for private channel Antena 3 with the role of Julia Wilson, a scientist that works for the ECND (Alejandria project) a secret project with the ultimate goal of helping the human species survive. Her role is that of the doctor on the "Estrella Polar" and centers on her comings and goings with Ricardo Montero, the Captain of "Estrella Polar" (Juanjo Artero) and with Ulises Garmendia (Mario Casas) along with her animosity towards Gamboa (Juan Pablo Shuk). In 2013, she starred in the film Alpha based on real life events where she plays the role of Sonia. In 2014, she starred in the film Perdona si te llamo amor and the series Hermanos, on Telecinco.

== Filmography ==
=== Cinema ===
- Una Piraña en el Bidé (1996) Like Africa.
- Amic/Amat (1998)
- Fausto 5.0 (2001)
- El príncipe de jonas (2001)
- Una casa de locos (2002)
- Lo mejor que le puede pasar a un cruasán (2003)
- Iris TV (2003)
- Nubes de verano (2004)
- Rottweiler (2004)
- Las muñecas rusas (2005)
- Les Poupées Russes (2005)
- A ras de suelo (2005)
- Tu vida en 65' (2006)
- Body Armour (2006)
- Andalucía (2007)
- La mujer del anarquista (2008)
- Todo está en el aire (2009)
- Alpha (2013)
- Insensibles (2013)
- Asmodexia (2014) (próximamente)
- Perdona si te llamo amor (2014)
- La llave de la felicidad (2016)

==== Short films ====
- Nunca digas (2011)
- 72 horas

=== Television ===
- Poblenou (1994)
- Rosa (1995)
- Estació d'enllaç (1995)
- La festa de l'espectacle (1995)
- Rosa, la lluita (1996)
- Sitges (1996)
- La Grand Batre (1997)
- Laura (1998)
- De moda (2000)
- Mirall trencat (2002)
- Night club (2002)
- Temps de silenci (2002)
- Temps Fugit (2003)
- Alberte (2004)
- Cuéntame cómo pasó. (2004–2005)
- Silenci? (2005)
- L'ombre d'un crime (2005)
- Mar de fons (2006–2007)
- RIS Científica (2007)
- Herederos (2008)
- El internado (2009–2010)
- Alakrana (2010)
- El Barco (2011–2013)
- Hermanos (2014)
- Nico & Sunset (2015)
- La verdad (2016)
- Carlos, Rey Emperador (2016)
- Night and Day (2017)
- La Verdad (2018)

==== Theatre ====
- Primera plana
- Fedra
- Lulú
- El criat

==== Programmes ====
- Jo què sé (2011)
- Password (2011)
- Atrapa un millón (2011)

==== Advertisements ====
- Estrella Damm - "La feina ben feta" (2009)
- Casa dels Xuklis (2010).

== Awards ==
Year	Category	Award	Result
2005	Mejor actriz española revelación	Cartelera Turia	Winner
2012	Mejor actriz de serie	Neox Fan Awards	Winner
2013	Mejor actriz de serie	Celebrities Awards	Winner
