= Summer's Clouds =

- Theatrical release poster
- Spanish: Nubes de verano
- Directed by: Felipe Vega
- Screenplay by: Felipe Vega; Manuel Hidalgo
- Produced by: Gerardo Herrero; Marta Esteban
- Starring: Roberto Enríquez; Natalia Millán; David Selvas; Irene Montalà; Roger Casamajor
- Cinematography: Alfonso Parra
- Edited by: Ángel Hernández Zoido
- Music by: Josep Sanou
- Production companies: Tornasol Films; Messidor Films
- Distributed by: Alta Classics
- Release dates: 26 April 2004 (Málaga); 30 April 2004 (Spain)
- Country: Spain
- Languages: Spanish; Catalan

Summer's Clouds (Spanish: Nubes de verano) is a 2004 Spanish drama film directed by Felipe Vega. It features Roberto Enríquez, Natalia Millán, David Selvas, Irene Montalà, and Roger Casamajor.

== Plot ==
Set on the Costa Brava, in the Baix Empordà, a couple from Madrid (Ana and Daniel) and their son (Manuel) move in there to have a Summer vacation, coming across local Marta, Marta's boyfriend Tomás and cousin Robert.

== Cast ==
- Roberto Enríquez as Daniel
- Natalia Millán as Ana
- Kevin Almodóvar as Manuel
- Irene Montalà as Marta
- David Selvas as Robert
- Roger Casamajor as Tomás
- Michelle Jenner

== Production ==
The film is a Tornasol Films and Messidor Films production. Shooting began in 2003 on the Costa Brava, Catalonia. It features dialogue in Spanish and Catalan.

== Release ==
The film was presented at the 7th Málaga Film Festival in April 2004. Distributed by Alta Classics, it was released theatrically in Spain on 30 April 2004.

== Reception ==
Jonathan Holland of Variety deemed Summer's Clouds to be an "satisfyingly rounded and thought-provoking piece, gratifying both heart and head".

Nuria Vidal of Fotogramas rated the film 3 out of 5 stars, highlighting the discovery of Millán and Montalà as the best thing about the film.

Alberto Bermejo of El Mundo rated the film with 4 stars, writing that it "shows with beautiful simplicity how complex people can be, and are."

== See also ==
- List of Spanish films of 2004
