= Lola Marceli =

Spanish actress

- Marceli in 2026
- Born: 1967 (age 58–59); Alicante, Spain
- Occupation: Actress

Lola Marceli (born 1967) is a Spanish actress. She earned early public recognition in the 1990s for her performance as Mercedes in El súper.

== Biography ==
Born in Alicante in 1967, she was raised in between Alicante and Málaga. She trained at the Málaga's Escuela Superior de Arte Dramático (ESAD). Cast in 1996 in the soap opera El súper, her breakout performance as a self-sacrificing wife deceived by her husband consolidated her career. Her performance as a fiery Spanish woman scorned by her husband in the 2001 Australian comedy-drama film La Spagnola earned Marceli a nomination to the AFI Award for Best Leading Actress. She landed subsequent main cast roles in Hospital Central, Un chupete para ella, Amar es para siempre, Padres, SMS (as a lawyer and the mother of Paula, the character played by Amaia Salamanca), Bandolera, Víctor Ros, and Mercado central.

== Filmography ==
Television

| Year | Title | Role | Notes | Ref |
|---|---|---|---|---|
| 1996–1999 | El súper | Mercedes | Main | |
| 2001 | Hospital Central | Dr. Paula Herrero | Main. Season 2 | |
| 2002 | Un chupete para ella | Laura | Main | |
| 2006–2007 | SMS: Sin Miedo a Soñar | Cristina | Main | |
| 2007–2009 | Amar en tiempos revueltos | Julieta | Main | |
| 2009–2010 | Padres | Silvia | Main | |
| 2011–2013 | Bandolera | Adela Oria | Main | |
| 2014 | Víctor Ros | Doña Rosa | Main. Season 1 | |
| 2018–2020 | Élite (Elite) | Beatriz Caleruega | Recurring. Seasons 1–3 | |
| 2019–2021 | Mercado central | Adela Villar | Main | |

Film

| Year | Title | Role | Notes | Ref |
|---|---|---|---|---|
| 2001 | La Spagnola | Lola | | |

== Awards and nominations ==
| Year | Award | Category | Nominee(s) | Result | Ref. |
|---|---|---|---|---|---|
| 2001 | 43rd AFI Awards | Best Actress in a Leading Role | La Spagnola | Nominated | |
