= Tienes Talento =

Spanish version of the international Got Talent series

- Created by: Simon Cowell
- Presented by: Nuria Roca; Eduardo Aldán
- Judges: Natalia Millán; Josep Vicent; Miqui Puig; David Summers (first episode)

Production
- Producer: Grundy (2008)
- Running time: 180 minutes
- Production companies: FremantleMedia; Sycotv

Original release
- Network: Cuatro
- Release: 25 January – 21 April 2008

Tienes Talento (transl. You've Got Talent) is the original Spanish version of the international Got Talent series. The idea behind the programme is to search for the most talented and promising entertainment. The series premiered originally on 25 January 2008 as Tienes Talento on Cuatro, hosted by Nuria Roca and Eduardo Aldán. The judges were David Summers, Natalia Millán and Josep Vicent; the latter was replaced by Miqui Puig after one episode. Cuatro aired one season of the show and then it was discontinued.

On 21 April 2008, 16-year-old flamenco singer Salva Rodríguez won the finale with 23% of the televote.

== Revival ==
After a long hiatus, the rights were purchased in 2015 by Mediaset España announcing its revival under the amended name Got Talent España and with a new host Santi Millán. The new show premiered on 13 February 2016.
