= Todos los hombres sois iguales (TV series) =

Spanish television series

- Genre: Comedy
- Created by: Joaquín Oristrell
- Based on: Todos los hombres sois iguales (1994 film)
- Starring: Josema Yuste; Tito Valverde; Luis Fernando Alvés
- Country of origin: Spain
- Original language: Spanish
- No. of seasons: 5
- No. of episodes: 66

Production
- Production company: BocaBoca

Original release
- Network: Tele 5
- Release: 23 September 1996 – 27 December 1998

Related
- Tutti gli uomini sono uguali.

Todos los hombres sois iguales (lit. 'All You Men Are the Same') is a Spanish comedy television series that originally aired on Telecinco from 23 September 1996 to 27 December 1998. Starring Josema Yuste, Tito Valverde and Luis Fernando Alvés, it consisted of the adaptation of the eponymous 1994 film to a television format.

== Premise ==
The fiction tracks the vicissitudes of three divorced men living in the same apartment and seeking for the attention of the cleaner.

== Cast ==
- Josema Yuste as Joaquín.
- Tito Valverde as Manolo.
- Luis Fernando Alvés as Juan Luis.
- Ana Otero as Yoli.
- Elisa Matilla as Susana.
- Laura Pamplona as Caty.
- Isabel Ordaz as Esther.
- Juan Carlos Vellido as Nico.
- Julieta Serrano.
- Irene Bau as Chelo.
- Esperanza Campuzano s Rosa.
- Neus Asensi as Marga.

== Production and release ==
The series was created by Joaquín Oristrell and it consisted of the adaptation of the eponymous 1994 film. It was produced by BocaBoca. Spanning across 5 seasons and 66 episodes, the original broadcasting run lasted from 23 September 1996 to 27 December 1998. The format was sold in Italy, spawning a remake titled Tutti gli uomini sono uguali.
