= King of the Hill (2007 film) =

- Theatrical release poster
- Spanish: El rey de la montaña
- Directed by: Gonzalo López-Gallego
- Screenplay by: Javier Gullón; Gonzalo López-Gallego
- Produced by: Juanma Arance; Álvaro Augustin; Miguel Bardem; Juan Pita
- Starring: Leonardo Sbaraglia; María Valverde
- Cinematography: José David Montero
- Edited by: Gonzalo López-Gallego
- Music by: David Crespo
- Production companies: Goodfellas; Decontrabando; Telecinco Cinema
- Distributed by: Buena Vista International
- Release dates: 8 September 2007 (Toronto); 12 September 2008 (Spain)
- Running time: 90 minutes
- Country: Spain
- Language: Spanish

King of the Hill (Spanish: El rey de la montaña, lit. 'The King of the Mountain') is a 2007 Spanish survival thriller film directed by Gonzalo López-Gallego from a screenplay by Javier Gullón and López-Gallego. It stars Leonardo Sbaraglia and María Valverde.

== Plot ==
Quim is driving through an isolated rural area and arrives at a petrol station. He is trying to get in contact with a woman named Sofia. Whilst on the phone, he spots a woman shoplifting and meets her in the bathroom. They have sex and she steals his wallet. In an attempt to follow her to recover his belongings, his car is shot. When he pulls over to inspect the damage, a man with a rifle appears and shoots him in the leg.

Quim manages to get back into his car. He soon discovers that the road is blocked by a bulldozer and a fallen tree. He leaves the car to get a signal for his phone and call for help. He instead hears a rumbling back at the road where he left his car. He promptly drives back the way he came, only to run over his apparent pursuer.

Shortly after his car breaks down and he leaves for the woods where he meets Bea, the woman from the petrol station, who seems to be lost as well and denies having stolen Quim's wallet. One of her car tires has suffered a puncture which Quim reveals was actually caused by a gunshot. They rush to repair the tire and Quim suddenly becomes panicked and they drive off. They drive past Quim's car and see that it has been severely vandalised. The two continue driving until they come across an abandoned roadside café. After they break in and search for supplies they are met by a pair of policemen who are highly suspicious and violently subdue and question them. They do not believe Quim but once he reveals he has run one of the attackers over they agree to take them back to the body to check on his story. After they reach the body Quim is handcuffed to the car and the police investigate the body. The two police officers are fired upon and seemingly killed. After a tense moment hiding in the car Bea manages to leave and find a key to unlock Quim's handcuffs. They leave and run through the forest but one of the police officers has survived with a minor gunshot wound to the shoulder. He is still highly suspicious of the two thinking that they had something to do with the snipers. The trio run away through the forest, but upon reaching a particularly hazardous river they are shot at once again and the other police officer is killed soon after.

Quim and Bea take shelter for the night, with Quim making attempts to find out about Bea but she brushes him off, before being hunted once again in the morning by their pursuers. Bea takes a bullet to her shoulder and they both end up trapped in a large pit unable to climb out. With Bea's help Quim manages to get out but as he looks for a stick to help her he hears barking, panics and runs. After getting a fair distance away he changes his mind and begins to run back but before he gets back he hears a gunshot. As they make their way up a gulley and Quim, their pursuers drawing closer, chooses to abandon her to her fate. With Bea weeping and trapped in the gulley the hunters are finally revealed to be a pair of young boys who proceed to murder her. They are casual about it, with one remarking at how her blood splattered his companion's face and taking a picture of the body with a mobile phone. The film then switches to the viewpoint of the hunters as they track Quim through the forest. Quim flees alone, his hunters reveling in the sport. Eventually they come across a barn and stop for a break. When one of the boys starts adding points for a deer he had killed earlier the other becomes annoyed and accuses him of changing the rules to suit himself. They have an argument and it is revealed they are brothers, during this Quim manages to lock them in the barn and escape. Quim escapes to an abandoned village, the two brothers catch up with him and a tense game of cat-and-mouse ensues, but he manages to ambush and kill one of the boys by hiding in a pool of water, showing deep regret afterwards. The other brother approaches Quim, weeping and angry after his brothers death, and thrusts his gun at him, but Quim embraces him, only to have the boy struggle free and shoot himself off-camera. Quim weeps by the brother's bodies, thrusting his hands to the heavens as though in prayer, with the boy's dog that had allowed them to track Quim and his companions appearing soon afterwards and Quim putting a hand wearily to his head before the credits roll.

== Cast ==
- Leonardo Sbaraglia as Quim
- María Valverde as Bea
- Thomas Riordan as Big Brother
- Andrés Juste as Little Brother
- Pablo Menasanch as Young Guard
- Francisco Olmo as Older Guard
- Manuel Sánchez Ramos as Gas Station Employee

== Production ==
The film was shot on locations of the provinces of Soria, Burgos, and Segovia as well as the Madrid region.

== Release ==
The film had its North America premiere on 8 September 2007 as part of the 2007 Toronto International Film Festival and was released as King of the Hill by the Weinstein Company. It also screened at the 40th Sitges Film Festival in October 2007. Distributed by Walt Disney Studios Motion Pictures Spain, it was theatrically released in Spain on 12 September 2008.

== Reception ==
Peter Debruge of Variety assessed that "smarter than its Most Dangerous Game-style plot might suggest", the film provides the helmer "with both a stylish showcase for his talents and a platform for social commentary, though the message feels like something of an afterthought".

Mirito Torreiro of Fotogramas rated the film 3 out of 5 stars, considering that while the film was not free of issues such as the viewers being required to believe the first meeting between Sbaraglia and Valverde's characters, it is compensated by elements such as "its impeccable mise-en-scène".

== See also ==
- List of Spanish films of 2008
