= Aquí Paz y después Gloria =

Spanish television series

- Genre: Comedy
- Directed by: Joaquín Llamas; Jaime Botella; María Cereceda
- Starring: Antonio Resines; Antonio Molero; César Sarachu; Mónica Estarreado; Nazaret Jiménez Aragón
- Country of origin: Spain
- Original language: Spanish
- No. of seasons: 1
- No. of episodes: 8

Production
- Production companies: Mediaset España; Producciones Mandarina

Original release
- Network: Telecinco
- Release: 24 March – 10 August 2015

Aquí Paz y después Gloria is a Spanish comedy television series that originally aired from March to August 2015 on Telecinco. It stars Antonio Resines, Antonio Molero, César Sarachu, Mónica Estarreado and Nazaret Jiménez Aragón, among others.

== Premise ==
The fiction revolves around the mishaps in a Catholic parish church, primarily featuring the stories of two priests (one of whom is impersonated by his twin brother, a scoundrel) and a bishop.

== Cast ==
- Antonio Resines as Paco / Ángel.
- Antonio Molero as Julián.
- César Sarachu as Obispo Martínez Carrión.
- Mónica Estarreado as Paz.
- Nazaret Jiménez Aragón as Gloria.
- César Camino as Curro.
- Bea de la Cruz as Remi.
- Agnes Kiraly as Anka.
- Belén Cuesta as Tere.
- Cristian Valencia as Moss.
- David Amor as Fermín.
- Juan Antonio Lumbreras as El Morfi.
- José Manuel Poga as Roque.
- Lucía de la Fuente as Saray.
- Malena Gutiérrez as Cuca.
- María Hervás as Melany.
- Pepo Suevos as Manolo.

== Production and release ==
Tentatively titled as He visto un ángel during the early production stages, Aquí Paz y después Gloria was produced by Mediaset in collaboration with Producciones Mandarina. The pilot of He visto un ángel, directed by Fernando Colomo, and starring the likes of Antonio Resines, María Barranco, Miguel Rellán, Lilian Caro, Elena Rivera, Jordi Vilches, Julieta Serrano and Enrique Villén, left the Telecinco authorities unconvinced and the series was remade, featuring a new title and a revamped cast.

Formed by Inés París, Joaquín Górriz, Juan Vicente Pozuelo, David Planell, Daniela Fejerman, Ernesto Pozuelo, Fernando Colomo, Silvia Pérez Pablos and Jorge Naranjo, the writing team was coordinated by Inés París. Joaquín Llamas, Jaime Botella and María Cereceda directed the episodes.

The series premiered on prime time on Telecinco on 24 March 2015. While the first episode earned an excellent 20.7% audience share, viewership figures plummeted down to a 9.9% in the third episode, and the series was shelved after the fourth episode. Later in the year, in July 2015, Telecinco brought back the series for the broadcasting of the remaining four episodes, which performed even worse. The broadcasting run ended on 10 August 2015 with the airing of the last episode of the season, which earned a miserable 6.0% audience share.

Series	Episodes	Originally released			Viewers	Share (%)	Ref.
Series	Episodes	First released	Last released	Network	Viewers	Share (%)	Ref.
1	8	24 March 2015	10 August 2015	Telecinco	1,826,000	10.9	

No. in season	Title	Viewers	Original release date	Share (%)
1	"Mariscada asesina"	3,681,000	24 March 2015	20.7
2	"El dedo en la llaga"	2,877,000	31 March 2015	16.4
3	"Paga pichurri"	1,941,000	7 April 2015	9.9
4	"Un minuto de gloria"	1,854,000	15 April 2015	11.4
5	"Somos un Dreamteam"	1,211,000	20 July 2015	8.5
6	"Vade retro, Julián"	1,886,000	27 July 2015	7.5
7	"Kung Fu Paco"	732,000	3 August 2015	6.5
8	"El olor de santidad"	429,000	10 August 2015	6.0

== See also ==
- 2015 in Spanish television
- List of programs broadcast by Telecinco
