= El súper (TV series) =

Spanish television series

- Genre: Soap opera
- Country of origin: Spain
- Original language: Spanish
- No. of seasons: 4
- No. of episodes: 738

Production
- Running time: 20–30 min
- Production companies: Zeppelin; Diagonal TV; Estudios Picasso

Original release
- Network: Tele 5
- Release: 6 September 1996 – 31 December 1999

El súper, also known as El súper: Historias de todos los días, is a Spanish soap opera. Aired from 1996 to 1999, it was the first daily television series produced in Spain broadcast at the national level.

== Premise ==
The fiction follows Julia, a woman working as a cashier in a supermarket. After Julia finds out she is a member of the Bernal family and thus the rightful heir to the supermarket chain she works in, she becomes the main foe of Alfonso Torres, a villain figure responsible for most of the crimes happening in the series.

== Cast ==
- Natalia Millán as Julia Ponce
- Andrés Resino as Alfonso Torres
- Paca Gabaldón as Maika Bernal
- Lola Marceli as Mercedes
- Manuel Navarro as Ernesto
- Mónica Estarreado as Leticia
- Miguel Ortiz as Agustín Rueda
- Teté Delgado as Mari Carmen
- Chisco Amado as Santiago
- Miguel Hermoso as Miguel
- Juan y Medio as Carlos
- Juncal Rivero as Verónica
- Karla Sofía Gascón as Guillermo
- Manuel Bandera

== Production and release ==
El súper was the first daily national television series produced in Spain. A regional daily series, the Catalan Poble Nou, predated the series. Filming started in August 1996 in a Tele 5 set located in Villaviciosa de Odón. Some prominent screenwriters such as Orestes Lara, Rodolf Sirera, Jaume Banacolocha, Virginia Yagüe, and Adolfo Puerta were part of the scriptwriting team. Boris Izaguirre also worked as screenwriter. The series was a mash-up of elements from US soap operas (such as Falcon Crest), the thriller genre and the telenovela.

The first two seasons were produced by Zeppelin and Diagonal TV whereas the following two seasons were produced by Estudios Picasso.

Aired from 6 September 1996 to 31 December 1999, The broadcasting run comprised 4 seasons and 738 episodes, broadcast at late afternoon. The running time was 20–30 minutes. The series' main tune (initially an instrumental sax theme to which the vocals of Natalia Millán added in the second season) became very popular in Spain.
