= Sexykiller =

- Theatrical release poster
- Spanish: Sexykiller, morirás por ella
- Directed by: Miguel Martí
- Written by: Paco Cabezas
- Produced by: Jaume Roures; Tedy Villalba
- Starring: Macarena Gómez; Alejo Sauras; César Camino
- Cinematography: Carles Gusi
- Edited by: David Pinillos
- Music by: Fernando Velázquez
- Production companies: Mediapro; Warner Bros. Pictures España; Antena 3 Films
- Distributed by: Warner Bros. Pictures
- Release date: 10 October 2008
- Running time: 100 minutes
- Country: Spain
- Language: Spanish

Sexykiller (Spanish: Sexykiller, morirás por ella) is a 2008 Spanish comedy horror film directed by Miguel Martí and written by Paco Cabezas. It stars Macarena Gómez as the title character.

== Plot ==
A femme fatale fashionista at a trendy design school embarks on a brutal and bloody killing spree, while gleefully evading the hapless cops assigned to the murder cases.

== Cast ==
- Macarena Gómez as Bárbara / Sexykiller
- César Camino as Tomás
- Alejo Sauras as Alex
- Ángel de Andrés López as Inspector
- Nadia Casado as Clara
- Carolina Bona as María
- Andreu Castro as Edu
- Juan Díaz as Jesus
- Juan Carlos Vellido as Anatomy Professor
- Ramón Langa as Decan
- Fernando Ramallo as Angel

== Production ==
The film is a Mediapro, Warner Bros. España and Antena 3 Films production. Jaume Roures and Tedy Villalba were credited as producers.

== Release ==
Distributed by Warner Bros. Pictures International España, the film was theatrically released in Spain on 10 October 2008.

== Filmic references ==
The film makes a nod to many classic horror films including Taxi Driver, Friday the 13th, The Silence of the Lambs, The Evil Dead, The Texas Chain Saw Massacre and Night of the Living Dead.

== See also ==
- List of Spanish films of 2008
