= Los misterios de Laura =

- Also known as: The Mysteries of Laura
- Genre: Police procedural; Comedy drama
- Created by: Javier Holgado; Carlos Vila
- Directed by: Pau Freixas
- Starring: María Pujalte; Fernando Guillén Cuervo; Oriol Tarrasón; César Camino; Laura Pamplona; Beatriz Carvajal
- Theme music composer: Federico Jusid
- Composer: Federico Jusid
- Country of origin: Spain
- Original language: Spanish
- No. of seasons: 3
- No. of episodes: 32 + 3 TV movies

Production
- Executive producers: Carmen de Leiva; María José Caballero
- Camera setup: Multi-camera
- Running time: 60 minutes
- Production company: Boomerang TV for Televisión Española

Original release
- Network: La 1
- Release: July 28, 2009 – April 8, 2014

Related
- The Mysteries of Laura

The Mysteries of Laura (transl. Los misterios de Laura) is a prime-time Spanish police procedural comedy-drama television series that was broadcast on La 1 of Televisión Española from 2009 to 2014, followed by three television movies broadcast in 2022 and 2023. It stars María Pujalte as Laura Lebrel, a police detective with a disorganized personal and professional life, and a casual and pleasant personality, but with a great nose and intuition for solving intriguing cases.

The series, that was initially going to be named Madres y detectives (transl. Mothers & Detectives), premiered on 27 July 2009 with huge success, surpassing the rival of the night CSI: Crime Scene Investigation.

The series has been adapted in Italy as I misteri di Laura starring Carlotta Natoli, the Netherlands as Rechercheur Ria starring Ellen Pieters and Russia as Mama-detektiv starring Inga Strelkova-Oboldina. On 8 May 2014, American network NBC announced an American adaptation, titled The Mysteries of Laura and starring Debra Messing.

== Cast and characters ==
Character	Portrayed by	Seasons			TV movies
Character	Portrayed by	1	2	3	TV movies
Laura Lebrel del Bosque	María Pujalte	Main	Main	Main	Main
Jacobo Salgado Sexto	Fernando Guillén Cuervo	Main	Main	Main	
Martín Maresca Delfino	Oriol Tarrasón	Main	Main	Main	Main
Vicente Cuevas	César Camino	Main	Main	Main	Main
Lydia Martínez Fernández	Laura Pamplona	Main	Main	Main	Main
Maribel del Bosque	Beatriz Carvajal		Main	Main	Main
Javier Salgado Lebrel	Raúl del Pozo	Main	Main	Main	Main
Carlos Salgado Lebrel	Juan del Pozo	Main	Main	Main	Main
Maite Villanueva	Eva Santolaria	Main			
Victoria Conde	Elena Irureta	Main			
Héctor Herranz	Raúl Mérida				Main

Laura Lebrel del Bosque (María Pujalte) is the main character. Her personal and professional life is disorganized, but she manages to combine her role as the mother of twins and as police detective perfectly, always using intuition as a means of connection between her lives. What is surprising is that she does not give importance to material or physical evidence, however, she does give importance to a faded shade, coffee stains on the table, the degrees marking the air conditioning thermostat... she always ends up solving the case at the end of the show with a Sherlock Holmes style, surprising the rest of the characters and the audience.

Jacobo Salgado Sexto (Fernando Guillén Cuervo) is the Chief Inspector of the police station where Laura works since the departure of Gerardo, he's also Laura's ex-husband. He is honest and straightforward. He doesn't participate in the investigations of Laura and Martin, he does his work from his office. The relationship with Laura and Martin is not entirely cordial, and "office life" is not at all easy.

Martín Maresca Delfino (Oriol Tarrasón) is a police detective and Laura's partner and sidekick at work. Restless and impulsive, he is the opposite of Laura. After several years working together, they have come to be blended to perfection. Something he shares with Laura is that he doesn't give importance to material or physical evidence. The twins of Laura call him "Uncle Martin." Although no one else knows, he is "DW", the writer of the blog about "The mysteries of Laura", a tangible proof of his affection and admiration for Laura and perhaps something more. He is somewhat promiscuous and flirts with almost all women, something that brings him some problems.

Vicente Cuevas (César Camino) is a rookie police officer with a lot of nerves and insecurity. The agent Cuevas took over four years to pass the exams to be into the Police Force. His youth, lack of character and lack of experience make him an easy target for criminals who is supposed to stop. His lack of nerve as a field agent is compensated with a great effort to learn and to always follow the orders of his superiors. He is also very good at working with computers, work performed at the police station. His affable and cheerful personality makes him a dear friend of Laura. He wins the heart of Lydia and even asks her to marry him.

Lydia Martínez Fernández (Laura Pamplona) is a police detective working at the station. Her way of working hardly fits with Laura, Lydia's working method is systematic, analytical and scientific. She works in the police laboratory. Lydia doesn't consider Laura as a real police detective and clashes with her are obvious. Her relationships with other co-workers is not much better. She has a past life: she changed her name to not be found by her husband. She had a past relationship with Jacobo. Later, Cuevas managed to break the hard shell covering her heart.

Maribel del Bosque (Beatriz Carvajal) is Laura's mother. After passing through a bad time, Maribel decides to move with her daughter. She loves her grandchildren, but due to their restless nature she did not hold them for long. Instead of removing work from Laura, she seems to give her more. She doesn't like the profession of her daughter, but unwittingly and thoughtlessly she always gives her clues for her police cases when they are discussing them off the record. She has the same casual and pleasant personality of her daughter.

Javier Salgado Lebrel (Raúl del Pozo) is son of Laura and Jacobo, twin brother of Carlos. He's very naughty and makes thousands of pranks with Carlos, even at school.

Carlos Sagrado Lebrel (Juan del Pozo) is son of Laura and Jacobo, twin brother of Javier. He's very naughty and makes thousands of pranks with Javier, even at school.

== Episodes ==
Season	Episodes	Originally released		Avg. viewers (millions)	Avg. share
Season	Episodes	First released	Last released	Avg. viewers (millions)	Avg. share
1	6	28 July 2009	31 August 2009	2.201	16.0%
2	13	25 April 2011	18 July 2011	3.103	16.6%
3	13	14 January 2014	8 April 2014	2.454	20.7%
TV movie 1		13 January 2022		1.329	10.4%
TV movie 2		13 December 2023		1.188	11.3%
TV movie 3		20 December 2023		0.959	9.2%

=== Season 1 (2009) ===
No. overall	No. in season	Title	Original release date	Spain viewers (millions)	Share
1	1	"The mystery of the sealed room"	28 July 2009	2.679	18.6%
2	2	"The mystery of the perfect neighbourhood"	3 August 2009	2.189	16.3%
3	3	"The mystery of the perfect alibi"	10 August 2009	2.278	17.3%
4	4	"The mystery of the crime scene"	17 August 2009	1.896	15.6%
5	5	"The mystery of the blue parrot"	24 August 2009	1.793	12.9%
6	6	"The mystery of the announced corpse"	31 August 2009	2.370	15.3%

=== Season 2 (2011) ===
No. overall	No. in season	Title	Original release date	Spain viewers (millions)	Share
7	1	"The mystery of the man who kept silent forever"	25 April 2011	2.817	14.0%
8	2	"The mystery of the Diogenes club"	2 May 2011	2.483	12.1%
9	3	"The mystery of the man who never existed"	9 May 2011	2.901	14.3%
10	4	"The mystery of the unsatisfied patient"	16 May 2011	2.906	14.7%
11	5	"The mystery of the man who didn't want to die"	23 May 2011	2.975	14.9%
12	6	"The mystery of the eight mercilessly men"	30 May 2011	3.225	15.9%
13	7	"The mystery of the howler witness"	6 June 2011	3.654	17.6%
14	8	"The mystery of the impossible trick"	13 June 2011	3.238	17.1%
15	9	"The mystery of the abbey of the crime"	20 June 2011	3.313	17.7%
16	10	"The mystery of the man without a past"	27 June 2011	3.175	18.1%
17	11	"The mystery of the red lady"	4 July 2011	3.076	18.9%
18	12	"The mystery of the ten strangers (part one)"	11 July 2011	3.188	20.0%
19	13	"The mystery of the ten strangers (part two)"	18 July 2011	3.388	20.8%

=== Season 3 (2014) ===
No. overall	No. in season	Title	Original release date	Spain viewers (millions)	Share
20	1	"The mystery of the room 308"	14 January 2014	2.380	22.7%
21	2	"The mystery of the time capsule"	21 January 2014	2.654	18.5%
22	3	"The mystery of the unexpected guest"	28 January 2014	2.597	15.0%
23	4	"The mystery of the woman who was left over"	4 February 2014	2.237	23.2%
24	5	"The mystery of the worried passenger"	11 February 2014	2.127	16.5%
25	6	"The mystery of the invisible murderer"	18 February 2014	2.613	17.7%
26	7	"The mystery of the crime of the century"	25 February 2014	1.919	21.7%
27	8	"The mystery of the distraught ghost"	4 March 2014	2.332	17.3%
28	9	"The mystery of the spy who talked too much"	11 March 2014	2.483	16.4%
29	10	"The mystery of the trapped mice"	18 March 2014	2.301	24.0%
30	11	"The mystery of the faces of the truth"	25 March 2014	2.432	18.0%
31	12	"The mystery of the number 17 (part one)"	1 April 2014	2.947	30.0%
32	13	"The mystery of the number 17 (part two)"	8 April 2014	2.890	28.0%

=== TV movies ===
No.	Title	Original release date	Spain viewers (millions)	Share
33	"The mystery of the unexpected murderer"	13 January 2022	1.329	10.4%
34	"The mystery of the bride who waited too long"	13 December 2023	1.188	11.3%
35	"The mystery of the suspicious patient"	20 December 2023	0.959	9.2%
