= Chusa Barbero =

Spanish actress

- Born: 5 July 1969 (age 55); Madrid, Spain
- Occupation: actress

Chusa Barbero (born 5 July 1969) is a Spanish actress. She is best known for her film Besos para todos/Kisses for Everyone (2000) and Catarsis, for the former she was nominated for Goya Award for Best Supporting Actress. She also earned Actors' Union Award for Best Supporting Actress for Crematorio (2012).

== Filmography ==
=== Television ===
- El super (1996)
- Médico de familia (1997)
- Ada Madrina (1998)
- Hospital Central (2000)
- Cuéntame cómo pasó (2002)
- El comisario, (2003)-(2007)
- Xénesis, na mente del asesín (2007)
- L'internáu (2007)
- Fuera de sitiu (2008)
- Lalola (2008)
- Nun tas sola, Sara (2009)
- Crematoriu (2011).
- Amar es para siempre (2013)
- La que se avecina (2014)
- El Ministerio del Tiempo (2016)
- Centru Médicu (2016,2017,2018)
- serie Traición (2018)

=== Films ===
- Ente coloraes (1995)
- Tu nombre envenena mis sueños (1996)
- Besos pa toos (2000)
- Fai conmigo lo que quieras (2003)
- Catarsis (2004)
- Quierme (2007)
- Balada triste de trompeta (2010)

=== Short films ===
- A pagar en destín (1999)
- Venceyu (1999)
- El castigu (2006)
- Güei te amo (2012)
- La mio vida ye'l cine (2014)
- Horror Vacui (2015)

=== Theatre ===
- Don Juan Tenorio, de José Zorrilla. Dir. Ángel Facio (1991)
- Cabalgata, la maxa del tiempu. Dir. Joan Font (1992)
- Teatru Nacional, de David Edgard. Dir. Edgard Saba (1993)
- Blanco per fora, mariellu per dientro, ¿qué ye?, Musical. Dir. Adolfo Simón (1994)
- Wozzeck. Dir. José Carlos Plaza (1994)
- Macbeth, de Shakespeare. Dir. Arnold Taraborrelli (1995)
- El corazón de la comedia: musical. Dir. Connie Philp (1995)
- El burlador de Sevilla, de Tirso de Molina. Dir. José Maya (1996)
- De muyeres y casorios, starring Pedro Calderón de la Barca, Francisco de Quevedo and Jacinto Benavente. Dir. Fernando Rojas (1996)
- Quo vadis, el musical. Dir. Jaime Chávarri (1997)
- El perro del hortelano, de Lope de Vega. Dir. María Ruiz (1999)
- La prueba, de David Auburn. Dir. Jaime Chávarri (2002)
- Historia d'una escalera, d'Antonio Buero Vallina. Dir. Juan Carlos Pérez de la Fuente (2003)
- Rondo pa dos muyeres y dos homes, d'Ignacio Amestoy. Dir. Francisco Vidal (2005)
- El caballeru de Olmedo, de Lope de Vega. Dir. José Maya (2006)
- Cruel y tienru, de Martin Crimp. Dir. Javier García Yagüe (2006)
- Asina ye (si asina vos paez), de Luigi Pirandello. Dir. Miguel Narros (2007)
- La señorita Julia, de Strindberg. Dir. Miguel Narros (2008)
- El tiempu y los Conway, de J. B. Priestley. Dir. Juan Carlos Pérez de la Fuente (2010-2011)
- Retayos: fráxil y reflectante, de Clara Brennan. Dir. Mariano Barroso (2014)
- Cuatro Corazones con Frenu y Marcha tras, d'Enrique Jardiel Poncela.Dir. Gabriel Olivares (2017)
- Dempués del Ensayu, d'Inmar Bergmang.Dir. Juan Jose Afonso (2017)

== Awards and nominations ==
- Nominated Goya Award for Best Supporting Actress for Besos pa todos (2000)
- Nominated Theatre Actors' Association Award for La prueba, directed by David Auburn (2003)
- Won Best Actress Award at Cine de Ponferrada festival for Catarsis(2004)
- Won Best Actress Award at Cine de Lorca Festival for Catarsis (2005)
- Won Actors' Union Award for Best Actress for Crematoriu (2012)
