= Hospital Central =

Spanish medical drama television series

- Starring: Antonio Zabalburu; Luís Castro; Bárbara Muñoz; Pablo Carbonell; Begoña Maestre; Jordi Rebellón; Mónica Estarreado; Mar Regueras; José Lamuño; Nani Jiménez
- Country of origin: Spain
- Original language: Spanish
- No. of seasons: 20
- No. of episodes: 300

Production
- Running time: 80 min. (approx.)
- Production company: Videomedia

Original release
- Network: Telecinco
- Release: 30 April 2000 – 27 December 2012

Hospital Central ("Central Hospital"; previously Línea Roja) is a Spanish television series that follows the professional and personal lives of the staff of the fictitious Hospital Central in Madrid. New episodes are shown by Telecinco network in Spain, and cable/satellite channel Factoría de Ficción reruns them a couple of weeks later. Another cable/satellite channel, AXN, reruns the old episodes.

Produced by Videomedia, the series started in April 2000 and finished in December 2012 after its 20th season. It is often said to be a Spanish version of ER.

== Cast ==
=== Final cast ===
Actor	Character	Episodes
Antonio Zabalburu	Javier Sotomayor	1–300
Luís Castro	Guillermo "Guille" Vilches	97–300
Bárbara Muñoz	Alicia Monasterio	169–300
Pablo Carbonell	David Gimeno	222–300
Begoña Maestre	Raquel Castaño	243–300
Mónica Estarreado	Valeria Peralta	247–300
Jordi Rebellón	Rodolfo Vilches	1–205 / 249–300
Mar Regueras	Manuela Rubio	284–300
José Lamuño	Gorka Betania	284–300
Nani Jiménez	Ariadna Rubio	284–300

=== Departed cast ===
Actor	Character	Episodes
Ana Frau	Asunción "Choni"	1–13
Chusa Barbero	Susana Cortés	1–13
Lola Casamayor	† Cecilia Schumman	1–19
Lola Marceli	Paula Herrero	14–26
Carmen Arbex	Marta Vidal	22–26
Diana Lázaro	Leonor	1–26 / 87
Paulina Gálvez	Ana Ortiz	27–39
Jesús Cabrero	† Mario Quiroga	1–51
Reyes Moleres	Diana Dueñas	1–51 / 54 / 56
Rosa Mariscal	Andrea Valverde	1–80
Sergi Mateu	Santiago Bernal	1–86 / 200
Amaia Lizarralde	† Cristina Laguna	27–102
Armando del Río	Francisco "Fran" Crespo	55–114 / 200
María Casal	Elisa Sánchez	1–117 / 200
Alfonso Begara	Salva	114–122 / 141–148
Mercè Llorens	Begoña García	121–160
Ángel Pardo	Isidro "Rusti" Gálvez	1–153 / 200 / 283
Alicia Bogo	Eva Méndez	52–164
Marco de Paula	Roberto "Rober" Cuevas	121–164 / 200
Lluís Marco	Antonio Dávila	61–175
Alicia Borrachero	Cruz Gándara	87–184 / 200 / 283
Diana Palazón	† Laura Llanos	41–57 / 64–190 / 242
Roberto Álvarez	Julio Román	184–190
Nacho Fresneda	Manuel Aimé	52–212 / 283
Marian Álvarez	† Dolores "Lola" Sanz	191–224
Bea Segura	Mónica de la Fuente	161–235
Carolina Cerezuela	Verónica "Vero" Solé	191–238
Juana Acosta	Sofía Carrillo	206–242
Carles Francino	Raimundo Ibáñez	191–245
Sara Casasnovas	María José "Jose" Velasco	238–247
Núria Prims	Leire Durán	237–252
Félix Pons	Jacobo Muñiz	237–252
Jesús Olmedo	Carlos Granados	122–252
Gale	Daniel Lucena	255–263
David Andrade	† Waldo Jaramillo	206–268
Pedro Casablanc	† Fernando Mora	213–268
Enrique Berrendero	Boni	227–268
Fátima Baeza	Esther García	1–273 / 283
Patricia Vico	Macarena "Maca" Fernández	103–273 / 283
Rafael Amaya	† Enrique Guerrero	269–277
Adriana Torrebejano	† Irene Valencia	269–277
Adriana Ugarte	Natalia del Hoyo	273–277
Marisol Rolandi	Teresa Montoro	1–279 / 283
Iván Sánchez	Raúl Lara	161–283
Ángel Rouco	Diego Peláez	1–283
Elia Galera	Claudia Castilla	170–283
Roberto Drago	Héctor Béjar	73–287 / 300

=== Recurring cast ===
- Lucas (Arturo Arribas), SAMUR doctor.
- Fernando (Alberto Mateo), SAMUR doctor.
- Edgar (Amaruk Kayshapanta, season 15, episode 206 – 209 – 215)
- Susana (Tamara Arias, seasons 13–15), Hector's girlfriend.
- Alejandro Vilches (Kirian Sánchez, seasons 1–14), Dr. Vilches' teenaged son. Years ago, he suffered a grave depression after his best friend died, and tried to kill himself by jumping out of his window. He is anorexic.
- Dr. Bernardo Ferreira (Miguel Nieto, seasons 1–3, special appearance in season 4), hospital director. He left after suffering a heart attack.
- Dr. Miguel Seró (Ricard Rodriguez, seasons 2–4), a married pediatrician who had an affair with Andrea but ultimately returned to his wife and daughter.
- Nurse Marcelina "Queca" Martínez (Pepa Roldán, seasons 3–11), an ER nurse who later married Rusti. She left the job to be a stay at home mom.
- Dr. Manolo Hervás (Ferrán Rañé, season 3), a senior psychiatrist who sexually harassed Cristina and left the hospital when Santiago confronted him.
- Gonzalo (Juli Fàbregas, season 3), the leader of a dangerous sect disguised as a social worker, he managed to suck Diana in and killed Mario after he stopped his sect's mass suicide ritual. He finally killed himself.
- Mª Angeles Cabrera (Sílvia Sabaté, seasons 4–11), Dr. Aimé's ex-wife and mother of his daughter. She was an alcoholic who got into an abusive relationship. Aimé had to rescue her, and they grew closer again. She later dies in a car crash.
- Nacho Crespo (Aure Sánchez, seasons 4–6), Fran's brother. A graphic designer and illustrator who also was an ex-drug addict with a form of epilepsy. He fell in love with Eva and started dating her, until he found out she was cheating on him with his own brother Fran.
- Germán Prada (Fernando Guillén, seasons 4–6), the hospital administrator. He had no qualms in doing what was necessary to keep the status quo, and was Santiago's fiercest opponent.
- Nurse Miriam Canalda (Leticia Dolera, season 7), an ER nurse and Dr. Davila's niece. She was a cocaine addict who finally agreed to rehabilitate.
- Candela (Clara Lago, seasons 7–9), Cruz's teenaged daughter. She stayed with her mother after her parents divorced. She's currently studying abroad.
- Daniel "D.J." Alonso (Eloy Azorín, season 8), a medicine student who had a drunken one-night with Cruz and fell in love with her, but she refused his advances. He finally left medicine to follow his dream to become a disc-jockey in Ibiza.
- Gabriela Dávila (Marta Solaz, seasons 8–12), Dr. Davila's daughter who got diagnosed with cancer, but survived. During the treatment, she started a relationship with Héctor.
- Belén (Eva Marciel, season 8–12), Javier's wife. She was very much in love with him and didn't take well his leaving her. She's doing everything in her hand to prevent him from seeing their son, including moving to another town and claiming it wasn't really his son.
- Ágata Monasterio (Laura Pamplona, season 12), a high-ranking employee from the Ministry of Health who kept interfering in everything to make the hospital more cost-efficient. She took the job of hospital administrator, and fired Dávila among other things. She also tried to seduce Vilches, but failed.
- Tomás Carrero (Rafa Reaño, seasons 12–13), a police inspector. He's had an on-and-off relationship with Mónica for some time.
- Marina Lara (Lara Corrochano, season 12), Raúl's sister. She was an alcoholic in the midst of a divorce, when she disappeared. It was later found out that her husband had accidentally killed her in a discussion.

=== Special guest stars ===
During these eight years, Hospital Central also got some well-known actors and artists in Spain to do take on guest starring roles. Some of them were:

- Pilar López de Ayala
- José Sacristán
- Pilar Bardem
- Agustín González
- José Luis López Vázquez
- Lolita Flores (4-episode story arc)
- Jorge Sanz
- Chenoa as herself
- David Bisbal as himself
- Julieta Venegas as herself (with musical show included)
- Sancho Gracia as himself
- Lucía Caraballo as Nadia and as Nuria

== Episodes ==
=== Season 1 ===
No.	Title	Date	Correspondence
001	"Regalos del destino"	30 April 2000	2.790.000 viewers (16.3%)
002	"Los mejores cuidados"	7 May 2000	3.547.000 viewers (21.1%)
003	"Alta tensión"	14 May 2000	3.690.000 viewers (22.2%)
004	"Relaciones difíciles"	21 May 2000	3.531.000 viewers (21.3%)
005	"En la cuerda floja"	28 May 2000	3.752.000 viewers (27.3%)
006	"Fuera de juego"	4 June 2000	3.764.000 viewers (22.6%)
007	"Contra las cuerdas"	11 June 2000	3.994.000 viewers (23.6%)
008	"Secreto a voces"	18 June 2000	4.279.000 viewers (25.8%)
009	"Lazos de sangre"	25 June 2000	3.269.000 viewers (19.7%)
010	"Reencuentros"	2 July 2000	3.963.000 viewers (24.6%)
011	"Pretérito imperfecto"	9 July 2000	4.034.000 viewers (25.6%)
012	"No tocar, peligro de muerte"	16 July 2000	4.131.000 viewers (26.3%)
013	"Guardia vacía"	23 July 2000	4.174.000 viewers (25.8%)

=== Season 2 ===
No.	Title	Date	Correspondence
014	"Arrepentimientos"	11 January 2001	2.103.000 viewers (12.6%)
015	"No te olvides de mi"	18 January 2001	2.864.000 viewers (18.1%)
016	"Solo un deseo"	25 January 2001	3.553.000 viewers (21.2%)
017	"Noche de perros"	1 February 2001	3.962.000 viewers (24.1%)
018	"El comité de la muerte"	8 February 2001	3.731.000 viewers (22.5%)
019	"Quedate conmigo"	15 February 2001	4.006.000 viewers (24.0%)
020	"Órdenes"	22 February 2001	4.526.000 viewers (28.4%)
021	"Botellón, botellón"	1 March 2001	4.262.000 viewers (29.1%)
022	"Código 9"	8 March 2001	3.890.000 viewers (23.4%)
023	"Te llamarás Saúl"	15 March 2001	3.909.000 viewers (23.3%)
024	"Problemas de pareja"	22 March 2001	3.535.000 viewers (26.1%)
025	"Cumpleaños feliz"	29 March 2001	4.443.000 viewers (25.9%)
026	"Belleza robada"	5 April 2001	4.603.000 viewers (26.9%)

=== Season 3 ===
No.	Title	Date	Correspondence
027	"Seis meses después"	10 January 2002	4.456.000 viewers (27.8%)
028	"Nerea en globo"	17 January 2002	4.775.000 viewers (29.6%)
029	"Operación sin red"	23 January 2002	4.420.000 viewers (28.3%)
030	"El soldadito de plomo"	30 January 2002	5.301.000 viewers (31.9%)
031	"El túnel"	6 February 2002	3.544.000 viewers (21.3%)
032	"Nunca sin ti"	13 February 2002	5.319.000 viewers (32.6%)
033	"Los olvidos"	20 February 2002	4.945.000 viewers (31.9%)
034	"El atraco"	27 February 2002	5.315.000 viewers (32.5%)
035	"¿Recuerdas?"	6 March 2002	5.161.000 viewers (33.5%)
036	"Decisiones"	13 March 2002	4.614.000 viewers (30.7%)
037	"Confía en mí"	20 March 2002	5.278.000 viewers (27.0%)
038	"Ojo por ojo"	27 March 2002	3.522.000 viewers (26.3%)
039	"Padres e hijos"	3 April 2002	3.608.000 viewers (24.5%)
040	"Falso equilibrio"	10 April 2002	3.777.000 viewers (26.5%)
041	"Bienvenida a Urgencias"	17 April 2002	4.028.000 viewers (24.6%)
042	"Fuego"	24 April 2002	4.975.000 viewers (27.2%)
043	"Una familia más"	1 May 2002	3.288.000 viewers (22.8%)
044	"Por naturales"	8 May 2002	3.794.000 viewers (23.4%)
045	"Estrés"	15 May 2002	4.221.000 viewers (25.5%)
046	"El séptimo mandamiento"	22 May 2002	4.784.000 viewers (30.9%)
047	"A contratiempo"	29 May 2002	3.884.000 viewers (28.4%)
048	"Ensayo de un crimen"	5 June 2002	4.332.000 viewers (29.9%)
049	"La despedida"	12 June 2002	3.995.000 viewers (27.7%)
050	"Ataduras"	19 June 2002	4.055.000 viewers (28.1%)
051	"Un día cualquiera"	26 June 2002	4.662.000 viewers (30.4%)

=== Season 4 ===
No.	Title	Date	Correspondence
052	"Un día libre"	10 September 2002	3.681.000 viewers (26.7%)
053	"En el calor de Urgencias"	17 September 2002	3.967.000 viewers (25.1%)
054	"Sueños rotos"	24 September 2002	4.212.000 viewers (26.5%)
055	"Encuentros y desencuentros"	1 October 2002	4.465.000 viewers (27.5%)
056	"Turno de noche"	8 October 2002	4.488.000 viewers (27.5%)
057	"Hay días que sobran"	15 October 2002	4.728.000 viewers (29.3%)
058	"El vuelo de la suerte"	22 October 2002	4.616.000 viewers (27.1%)
059	"Nunca es tarde"	29 October 2002	4.256.000 viewers (25.7%)
060	"Entre mentiras"	5 November 2002	4.779.000 viewers (29.1%)
061	"Un ángel en Urgencias"	12 November 2002	4.669.000 viewers (28.9%)
062	"La cámara del secreto"	19 November 2002	4.851.000 viewers (28.2%)
063	"Fin de trayecto"	26 November 2002	4.452.000 viewers (25.2%)
064	"Casa tomada"	3 December 2002	4.781.000 viewers (28.2%)

=== Season 5 ===
No.	Title	Date	Correspondence
065	"Vida nueva"	7 January 2003	4.988.000 viewers (29.7%)
066	"Una mente en blanco"	14 January 2003	4.684.000 viewers (28.0%)
067	"A contrarreloj"	21 January 2003	5.023.000 viewers (29.0%)
068	"100 km/h"	28 January 2003	4.690.000 viewers (27.3%)
069	"Los viejos tiempos"	4 February 2003	5.191.000 viewers (29.9%)
070	"Pesadillas"	11 February 2003	4.908.000 viewers (28.4%)
071	"A examen"	18 February 2003	4.747.000 viewers (26.4%)
072	"Ahora o nunca"	25 February 2003	4.962.000 viewers (27.2%)

=== Season 6 ===
No.	Title	Date	Correspondence
073	"Quince años tiene mi amor"	3 September 2003	3.828.000 viewers (26.9%)
074	"Secretos, vergüenzas"	10 September 2003	3.407.000 viewers (22.4%)
075	"Segunda oportunidad"	17 September 2003	4.412.000 viewers (30.1%)
076	"La huelga"	24 September 2003	4.218.000 viewers (26.7%)
077	"Háblame de Andrea"	1 October 2003	4.258.000 viewers (26.3%)
078	"Cambio de planes"	8 October 2003	4.337.000 viewers (27.0%)
079	"¿Quieres hacer el favor de tratarme bien?"	15 October 2003	4.331.000 viewers (25.4%)
080	"Elementos de juicio"	22 October 2003	4.887.000 viewers (29.2%)
081	"El peor día de nuestras vidas"	29 October 2003	4.408.000 viewers (25.6%)
082	"Maratón"	5 November 2003	4.832.000 viewers (29.3%)
083	"Asuntos de familia"	12 November 2003	4.693.000 viewers (27.6%)
084	"Vertido"	19 November 2003	4.656.000 viewers (26.5%)
085	"Hasta que la muerte nos separe"	26 November 2003	4.943.000 viewers (29.5%)
086	"Los trapos sucios"	3 December 2003	4.453.000 viewers (25.8%)
087	"Amores difíciles"	10 December 2003	5.199.000 viewers (31.1%)
088	"Vacío de poder"	17 December 2003	4.278.000 viewers (24.2%)

=== Season 7 ===
No.	Title	Date	Correspondence
089	"Señales de duelo"	20 April 2004	4.115.000 viewers (22.1%)
090	"Aires de tormenta"	27 April 2004	4.463.000 viewers (24.7%)
091	"Héroes o personas"	4 May 2004	4.315.000 viewers (24.2%)
092	"Medidas desesperadas"	11 May 2004	4.557.000 viewers (24.8%)
093	"Kamikaze"	18 May 2004	4.901.000 viewers (27.8%)
094	"Incomunicación, Jiao Lou"	25 May 2004	4.777.000 viewers (26.7%)
095	"Historias del corazón"	1 June 2004	4.288.000 viewers (25.4%)
096	"Secretos y engaños"	8 June 2004	4.526.000 viewers (27.8%)
097	"Dominó"	15 June 2004	5.065.000 viewers (30.5%)
098	"A prueba"	22 June 2004	4.773.000 viewers (29.5%)
099	"El mejor regalo"	29 June 2004	4.285.000 viewers (29.6%)
100	"59:59"	6 July 2004	4.762.000 viewers (31.6%)
101	"Hay días malos y días peores"	13 July 2004	4.573.000 viewers (31.8%)
102	"SARS: treinta y ocho y medio"	20 July 2004	4.424.000 viewers (33.7%)

=== Season 8 ===
No.	Title	Date	Correspondence
103	"A ras"	7 September 2004	4.321.000 viewers (29.1%)
104	"Hijos difíciles"	15 September 2004	4.667.000 viewers (29.8%)
105	"La noche de los muertos vivientes"	22 September 2004	4.665.000 viewers (28.8%)
106	"A mano armada"	29 September 2004	4.975.000 viewers (30.3%)
107	"Otra, otra"	6 October 2004	4.243.000 viewers (24.0%)
108	"Amor de madre"	13 October 2004	4.506.000 viewers (24.5%)
109	"Suma de vectores"	20 October 2004	4.399.000 viewers (24.6%)
110	"En la salud y en la enfermedad"	27 October 2004	4.539.000 viewers (23.9%)
111	"¿Falta mucho?"	3 November 2004	4.808.000 viewers (26.5%)
112	"Ciento doce"	10 November 2004	5.036.000 viewers (27.0%)
113	"Amor de hermanos"	17 November 2004	4.504.000 viewers (23.1%)
114	"Entre la vida y la muerte"	24 November 2004	4.916.000 viewers (25.7%)
115	"Un mundo absurdo"	1 December 2004	4.814.000 viewers (25.8%)
116	"Fuegos artificiales"	8 December 2004	5.734.000 viewers (32.2%)
117	"Un cuento de Navidad"	15 December 2004	4.729.000 viewers (25.6%)
118	"A Torremolinos"	11 January 2005	6.025.000 viewers (32.4%)
119	"El amor es una enfermedad que no tiene cura"	18 January 2005	6.194.000 viewers (33.7%)
120	"SARS: treinta y ocho y medio"	25 January 2005	6.527.000 viewers (35.5%)

=== Season 9 ===
No.	Title	Date	Correspondence
121	"A corazón parado"	3 May 2005	5.159.000 viewers (28.7%)
122	"Seis caras iguales"	10 May 2005	5.545.000 viewers (30.8%)
123	"El mundo se desmorona"	17 May 2005	5.693.000 viewers (31.2%)
124	"... y tú y yo nos enamoramos"	24 May 2005	5.470.000 viewers (31.2%)
125	"Baño de sales"	31 May 2005	5.825.000 viewers (32.3%)
126	"Acción-reacción"	7 June 2005	5.460.000 viewers (31.3%)
127	"Estado de shock"	14 June 2005	5.138.000 viewers (30.2%)
128	"Si pudiera vivir nuevamente"	21 June 2005	5.121.000 viewers (31.9%)
129	"La culpa de todo"	28 June 2005	4.705.000 viewers (31.8%)
130	"Mundos paralelos"	5 July 2005	4.405.000 viewers (32.0%)
131	"Happy hour"	12 July 2005	4.550.000 viewers (33.2%)

=== Season 10 ===
No.	Title	Date	Correspondence
132	"El gas de la risa"	14 September 2005	4.782.000 viewers (30.3%)
133	"Renglones torcidos"	21 September 2005	4.787.000 viewers (30.2%)
134	"Obra y omisión"	28 September 2005	4.958.000 viewers (31.2%)
135	"Las llaves de casa"	5 October 2005	5.473.000 viewers (32.4%)
136	"En boca de todos"	12 October 2005	5.289.000 viewers (29.4%)
137	"Almas rotas"	19 October 2005	5.883.000 viewers (33.6%)
138	"No se lo digas a nadie"	26 October 2005	5.235.000 viewers (29.2%)
139	"Retrato de boda"	2 November 2005	5.466.000 viewers (30.3%)
140	"Amor de reina"	9 November 2005	5.098.000 viewers (26.1%)
141	"Érase una vez"	16 November 2005	5.229.000 viewers (27.5%)
142	"Examen de conciencia"	23 November 2005	5.118.000 viewers (27.9%)
143	"El sueño de la razón"	7 December 2005	4.960.000 viewers (30.2%)
144	"... o calle para siempre"	14 December 2005	5.229.000 viewers (29.5%)
145	"Examen de conciencia"	21 December 2005	5.213.000 viewers (29.1%)

=== Season 11 ===
No.	Title	Date	Correspondence
146	"El primer día"	29 March 2006	5.138.000 viewers (29.9%)
147	"Mentiras del corazón"	5 April 2006	4.933.000 viewers (26.7%)
148	"Las apariencias engañan"	19 April 2006	4.963.000 viewers (29.2%)
149	"Deja un bonito cadáver"	26 April 2006	4.921.000 viewers (27.7%)
150	"Si aquello no hubiera ocurrido"	3 May 2006	4.803.000 viewers (27.0%)
151	"Segundas partes"	11 May 2006	4.834.000 viewers (28.9%)
152	"Si tu me dices ven"	17 May 2006	4.409.000 viewers (25.5%)
153	"Relaciones encadenadas"	23 May 2006	5.274.000 viewers (30.5%)
154	"Vivir no es solo respirar"	31 May 2006	5.245.000 viewers (30.7%)
155	"El valor de una vida"	7 June 2006	4.905.000 viewers (31.1%)
156	"Compañero del alma, compañera"	14 June 2006	4.882.000 viewers (28.7%)
157	"Señales de humo"	21 June 2006	4.462.000 viewers (27.7%)
158	"Lo que uno hace con lo que tiene"	28 June 2006	4.915.000 viewers (31.6%)
159	"Apariencias"	6 July 2006	4.192.000 viewers (28.7%)
160	"Reflejos"	13 July 2006	4.561.000 viewers (33.1%)

=== Season 12 ===
No.	Title	Date	Correspondence
161	"Colores"	5 September 2006	4.101.000 viewers (27.6%)
162	"No quieras con desgana"	12 September 2006	4.559.000 viewers (28.5%)
163	"Game over"	20 September 2006	4.991.000 viewers (30.5%)
164	"No me acuerdo de olvidarte"	27 September 2006	4.992.000 viewers (29.7%)
165	"Cada final es un comienzo"	4 October 2006	5.267.000 viewers (30.8%)
166	"Sangre de mi sangre"	11 October 2006	4.461.000 viewers (27.6%)
167	"Prioridades"	18 October 2006	5.377.000 viewers (30.4%)
168	"El mayor dolor posible"	25 October 2006	5.720.000 viewers (31.0%)
169	"No hay heroes"	1 November 2006	5.049.000 viewers (29.8%)
170	"No busques excusas"	8 November 2006	5.196.000 viewers (28.7%)
171	"Todo y nada"	15 November 2006	5.606.000 viewers (34.4%)
172	"Caminos de Soledad"	22 November 2006	5.626.000 viewers (31.6%)
173	"Si amanece por fin"	29 November 2006	5.482.000 viewers (30.6%)
174	"Estrellas fugaces"	6 December 2006	5.001.000 viewers (29.5%)
175	"Cuéntame un cuento"	13 December 2006	5.957.000 viewers (33.5%)

=== Season 13 ===
No.	Title	Date	Correspondence
176	"De repente la risa se hizo llanto"	12 April 2007	4.746.000 viewers (26.8%)
177	"Tras la reina"	18 April 2007	3.900.000 viewers (21.6%)
178	"Dudas, decisiones... y pescado fresco"	25 April 2007	3.814.000 viewers (21.0%)
179	"En la salud..."	2 May 2007	4.227.000 viewers (22.7%)
180	"... y en la enfermedad"	9 May 2007	4.369.000 viewers (24.9%)
181	"Caminos tan sin poesía"	16 May 2007	3.889.000 viewers (20.5%)
182	"Y tú te vas"	23 May 2007	4.576.000 viewers (26.8%)
183	"Juego de identidades"	30 May 2007	4.155.000 viewers (23.5%)
184	"NRBQ: Alerta radiactiva"	6 June 2007	3.839.000 viewers (21.9%)
185	"No se puede vivir con miedo"	13 June 2007	4.024.000 viewers (22.6%)
186	"Recursos humanos"	20 June 2007	3.951.000 viewers (23.1%)
187	"La vida en un segundo"	27 June 2007	3.973.000 viewers (24.9%)
188	"Despídete por mí"	4 July 2007	3.519.000 viewers (22.5%)
189	"Lo que queda por hacer"	11 July 2007	3.619.000 viewers (24.0%)
190	"Veremos"	18 July 2007	3.541.000 viewers (26.1%)

=== Season 14 ===
No.	Title	Date	Correspondence
191	"Un año después"	5 September 2007	4.228.000 viewers (26.8%)
192	"La navaja de Occam"	12 September 2007	3.924.000 viewers (25.9%)
193	"Segunda oportunidad"	19 September 2007	4.432.000 viewers (26.3%)
194	"Cambio de estación"	26 September 2007	4.638.000 viewers (28.6%)
195	"La llamada de Occidente"	3 October 2007	4.265.000 viewers (25.2%)
196	"A Ribeira Sacra"	10 October 2007	4.089.000 viewers (23.7%)
197	"La vuelta a casa"	17 October 2007	4.353.000 viewers (25.8%)
198	"Otro turno de noche"	24 October 2007	4.610.000 viewers (27.7%)
199	"El motor que mueve el mundo"	31 October 2007	3.890.000 viewers (25.1%)
200	"Cosas que olvidamos contar"	7 November 2007	5.446.000 viewers (26.9%)
201	"Favor por favor"	14 November 2007	4.137.000 viewers (25.2%)
202	"La vida es otra cosa"	21 November 2007	4.448.000 viewers (25.7%)
203	"Tolerancia cero"	28 November 2007	3.770.000 viewers (21.3%)
204	"Mejor que nunca"	5 December 2007	3.500.000 viewers (21.1%)
205	"Historias mínimas"	12 December 2007	4.114.000 viewers (24.1%)

=== Season 15 ===
No.	Title	Date	Correspondence
206	"Un entierro, una boda y un cumpleaños"	23 April 2008	3.581.000 viewers (21.7%)
207	"Cosas de hombres"	30 April 2008	3.195.000 viewers (19.5%)
208	"Éxitos y fracasos"	14 May 2008	3.868.000 viewers (21.9%)
209	"Mañana será otro día"	21 May 2008	2.747.000 viewers (23.3%)
210	"Causas y consecuencias"	28 May 2008	3.578.000 viewers (20.5%)
211	"Amor y otras catástrofes"	4 June 2008	3.228.000 viewers (18.4%)
212	"Baile de máscaras"	11 June 2008	3.445.000 viewers (19.7%)
213	"El valor de los cobardes"	18 June 2008	3.189.000 viewers (18.8%)
214	"Pide tres deseos"	25 June 2008	3.358.000 viewers (20.6%)
215	"Cartas a Mayarí"	2 July 2008	3.474.000 viewers (22.3%)
216	"Después del final"	9 July 2008	2.956.000 viewers (21.0%)
217	"La carga del diablo"	16 July 2008	2.944.000 viewers (20.6%)
218	"Los golpes siguen cayendo"	23 July 2008	2.868.000 viewers (21.8%)
219	"Los restos del naufragio"	30 July 2008	3.127.000 viewers (23.6%)

=== Season 16 ===
No.	Title	Date	Correspondence
220	"Lista de pasajeros"	3 December 2008	3.316.000 viewers (19.3%)
221	"Cada verdad puede ser otra"	3 September 2008	3.503.000 viewers (23.8%)
222	"Eterno mientras dura"	10 September 2008	3.211.000 viewers (20.9%)
223	"Lo importante y lo relativo"	17 September 2008	3.279.000 viewers (19.8%)
224	"Para vivir un gran amor"	24 September 2008	3.355.000 viewers (22.2%)
225	"Todo el mundo quiere a Rai"	1 October 2008	3.433.000 viewers (20.0%)
226	"¿Blancas o negras?"	8 October 2008	3.667.000 viewers (21.0%)
227	"Quedamos a cenar"	15 October 2008	3.574.000 viewers (20.7%)
228	"Cuéntamelo todo"	22 October 2008	3.532.000 viewers (19.4%)
229	"Llegaremos a lo humano"	29 October 2008	3.606.000 viewers (21.0%)
230	"Un hombre, todos los hombres"	5 November 2008	3.432.000 viewers (19.7%)
231	"La vida es otra cosa"	12 November 2008	3.548.000 viewers (20.4%)
232	"Toda una vida"	19 November 2008	3.388.000 viewers (19.2%)
233	"La puerta está abierta"	26 November 2008	3.579.000 viewers (20.8%)
234	"La vida hay que vivirla"	10 December 2008	3.790.000 viewers (21.9%)
235	"Nadar hasta la orilla"	17 December 2008	3.593.000 viewers (21.9%)
236	"Quién lo probó lo sabe"	18 January 2009	3.173.000 viewers (17.8%)

=== Season 17 ===
No.	Title	Date	Correspondence
237	"Me voy a morir"	3 March 2009	3.444.000 viewers (17.3%)
238	"El mundo es de los valientes"	10 March 2009	3.293.000 viewers (19.0%)
239	"No podemos mirar para otro lado"	17 March 2009	3.040.000 viewers (17.6%)
240	"El tiempo entre los dedos"	24 March 2009	2.911.000 viewers (16.7%)
241	"¿Y ahora qué?"	31 March 2009	3.205.000 viewers (17.7%)
242	"Me encanta que los planes salgan bien"	7 April 2009	2.881.000 viewers (17.2%)
243	"Mil grados de separación"	14 April 2009	3.094.000 viewers (17.0%)
244	"La sonrisa de Jonás"	28 April 2009	3.156.000 viewers (17.5%)
245	"Juan 7.34"	5 May 2009	3.121.000 viewers (18.1%)
246	"Manos arriba"	12 May 2009	2.743.000 viewers (14.9%)
247	"Las nubes son solo nubes"	19 May 2009	3.003.000 viewers (16.8%)
248	"Permutaciones"	26 May 2009	2.865.000 viewers (16.3%)
249	"Es tan fácil morir"	2 June 2009	3.037.000 viewers (17.1%)
