= List of Spanish television series =

This is a list of Spanish television series and miniseries. This list is about series of fiction, so it does not include documentaries. This list also does not include television films nor theatrical representations or zarzuelas made for television. The spoken language (in original presentation) is in Spanish unless otherwise noted.

== 0/9 ==
- 4º sen ascensor (TVG, 2005) 33 episodes of 60 minutes. Comedy about three students who share a flat. (in Galician)
- 7 días al desnudo (Cuatro, 2005–2006) 8 episodes. Series about the workers of a sensationalist magazine.
- 7 vidas (Telecinco, 1999–2006) Comedy.
- 10 + 2 (TVE, 1994) 52 episodes of 11 minutes. Animated series. An owl is the teacher of some numbers.
- 11-M, para que nadie lo olvide (Telecinco, 2011) Miniseries of 2 episodes. Series based on the 2004 Madrid train bombings.
- 13 anys i un dia (TV3, 2008–2009) 24 episodes of 25 minutes. Comedy about a thief that escapes from prison to live with his brother'. (in Catalan)
- 13 x 13 (TV3, 1987–1988) 13 episodes of 50 minutes. Adaptations of Catalan literature. (in Catalan)
- 14 de abril. La República (La 1, 2011–2019). Period drama series set in the Second Spanish Republic.
- 16 dobles (TV3, 2003) 26 episodes of 50 minutes. Sequel of Temps de silenci. (in Catalan)
- 18. RDC (Ritmo de la calle) or 18, la serie (Antena 3, 2008 – 2009) 22 episodes of 50 minutes. Youth soap opera.
- 20-N: Los últimos días de Franco (Antena 3, 2008) Miniseries of 2 episodes of 70 minutes. About last days of dictator Francisco Franco.
- 20 tantos (Telecinco, 2002–2003) 28 episodes of 40 minutes. Youth soap that tried to recreate the success of Al salir de clase. Aired in the same time slot but was cancelled after two weeks.
- 23-F: El día más difícil del Rey (TVE, 2009) 2 episodes of 90 minutes. About the attempted coup d'état of 23-F.
- 23-F: Historia de una traición (Antena 3, 2009) 2 episodes of 85 minutes. About the attempted coup d'état of 23-F.
- 30 grados a la sombra (TVE, 1964) 13 episodes of 50 minutes. Comedy.
- Los 80 (Telecinco, 2004) 6 episodes of 90 minutes. Comedy set in the 1980s.
- 90-60-90, diario secreto de una adolescente (Antena 3, 2009) 16 episodes of 70 minutes. A teenage model falls in love with her photographer.
- 700 euros, diario secreto de una call girl (Antena 3, 2009) 16 episodes of 60 minutes. A girl has to work as a call girl after the accident of the man she loves.

== A ==
- A Electra le sienta bien el luto (TVE, 1986) Miniseries. Three episodes of 45 minutes. Theatrical adaptation of a play of Eugene O’Neill.
- A familia Pita (TVG, 1996–1998) Sitcom about a woman who rents rooms of her flat. Episodes of 27 minutes. (in Galician)
- A flor de pell (Canal Nou, 1997) Drama about two confronting families in Elche. (in Valencian)
- A la caça de la guineu (TV3) Animation. Sequel of Rovelló. (in Catalan)
- A las once en casa (TVE, 1998–2000) Family comedy.
- A medias (Antena 3, 2002) Comedy about two forty-somethings that share a flat with their daughters.
- A miña sogra e máis eu (TVG, 2004–2005) Comedy about a man who for economical reasons have to live with his mother-in-law. (in Galician)
- A su servicio (TVE, 1994) 10 episodes of 45 minutes. Unrelated plots all about the master-servant relationship.
- A tortas con la vida (Antena 3, 2005) Comedy.
- A través de la niebla (TVE, 1971) 13 episodes of 50 minutes. Unrelated plots about mystery and fantasy.
- ¡A ver si llego! (Telecinco, 2009) 6 episodes of 50 minutes. Comedy about the problems of the members of a market to make ends meet.
- A vida por diante (TVG, 2006–2007) 80 episodes of 60 minutes. Drama about a group of women whose husbands die in a shipwreck. (in Galician)
- Abierto 24 horas (Antena 3, 2000 – 2001) 20 episodes of 25 minutes. Comedy about a family with a grocery store.
- Abogados (Telecinco, 2001) 7 episodes of 60 minutes. Legal drama.
- Abuela de verano (TVE, 2005) 13 episodes of 60 minutes. Adaptation of the novel Diario de una abuela de verano by Rosa Regás.
- El abuelo (TVE, 1998, aired in 2001) Miniseries of two episodes of 80 minutes. Adaptation of the novel of Benito Pérez Galdós. Extended version of the 1998 film.
- Academia de baile Gloria (TVE, 2001) 16 episodes of 60 minutes. Comedy about an actress that put a dancing school in her house.
- Acacias 38 (La 1, 2015 – present) Soap opera set in 1898.
- Ácaros (Cuatro, 2006–2007) 26 episodes of 10 minutes. Comedy about a family of mites.
- El accidente (Telecinco, 2017–present) A woman suspects that her husband has not actually died in a plane crash.
- Acusados (Telecinco, 2009) Mystery. Similar to Damages.
- Ada madrina (Antena 3, 1999) 10 episodes of 50 minutes. Family drama.
- Adolfo Suárez, el presidente (Antena 3, 2010) Miniseries of 2 episodes. Biopic of Adolfo Suárez.
- L'agència de viatges (TV3, 1993) 13 episodes of 30 minutes. Comedy about a travel agency. (in Catalan)
- Agente 700 (TVE, 2001) 8 episodes of 30 minutes. Spy parody.
- Águila Roja (La 1, 2009 – present) Historical. Adventures.
- Aída (Telecinco, 2005–2014) Comedy about the residents of a humble district. Spin off of 7 vidas.
- Al filo de la ley (TVE, 2005) 13 episodes of 60 minutes. Legal drama.
- Al salir de clase (Telecinco, 1997–2002) Very successful youth soap opera
- ¡Ala... Dina! (TVE, 2000–2002) 57 episodes of 30/60 minutes. Comedy about a female genie freed by a widowed man.
- Las aventuras del capitán Alatriste (Telecinco, 2015) Adaptation of Diego Alatriste's novels.
- Alfonso, el príncipe maldito (Telecinco, 2010) Miniseries of 2 episodes. Biopic of Alfonso, Duke of Anjou and Cádiz.
- Algo que celebrar (Antena 3, 2015) Comedy about a family by its main events.
- Allí abajo (Antena 3, 2015 – present) Comedy about a Basque who has to live in Sevilla, after his mother left there in coma.
- L'alqueria de Blanca (Canal Nou, 2007–2008) 39 episodes of 60 minutes. Life of two families in a village of La Hoya de Alcoy in the 1960s. (in Valencian)
- Alquila 2 (ETB 2, 2001) 13 episodes of 25 minutes. Comedy about two rich siblings that become poor and have to share flat with other roommates.
- Alta mar (Netflix, 2019) Detective series set in the 1940s.
- Alta tensión (TVE, 1988–1994) 16 episodes of 90 minutes. Detective series.
- Altasu (ETB, 2020) Series based on the Altasu incident (in Basque)
- Álvaro y su mundo (TVE, 1961) 14 episodes of 15 minutes. Comedy.
- Amar en tiempos revueltos (TVE, 2005–2012) Soap opera set after the Spanish Civil War.
- Amar es para siempre (Antena 3, 2013 – present) Soap opera set in 1960. Sequel of Amar en tiempos revueltos.
- Ambiciones (Antena 3, 1998) 52 episodes of 30 minutes. Soap opera about two families that own newspaper agencies.
- Amistades peligrosas (Cuatro, 2006) 45 episodes of 25 minutes. Mystery about a murdered student.
- Amores difíciles (TVE, 1988) 6 episodes of 60 minutes. Adaptations of tales by Gabriel García Márquez.
- Ana Tramel. El Juego (TVE, 2021) 6 episodes. Legal thriller.
- Ana y los siete (TVE, 2002–2005) Comedy/drama. A sort of Spanish version of The Nanny about Ana, a showgirl that gets employed as nanny by a banker with seven children.
- Anclados (Telecinco, 2015) Comedy about the crew of a cruise.
- Andaluza y Samir, derechos a la aventura (Canal Sur, 2006–2007) 13 episodes of 1 minute. Animated series. Produced by Junta de Andalucía.
- Andorra, entre el torb i la Gestap (TV3, 2000) Miniseries of 4 episodes of 45 minutes. Adaptation of the novel by Frances Viadiu. (in Catalan)
- El ángel de Budapest (TVE, 2011) Miniseries of 2 episodes of 60 minutes. Based on Ángel Sanz Briz, a Spanish ambassador in Hungary who helped to save the lives of thousands of Jews from the Holocaust.
- Ángel o demonio (Telecinco, 2011) A young girl discovers she is an angel and has to fight evil.
- Angelino Pastor (TVE, 1967) 13 episodes of 30 minutes. Comedy.
- Anillos de oro (TVE, 1983) 13 episodes of 50 minutes. Legal drama.
- Animales racionales (TVE, 1972) 13 episodes of 30 minutes. Comedy.
- Antes de perder (playz, 2019) 7 episodes of 15 minutes. Action and comedy miniseries following a road movie format.
- Antivicio (Antena 3, 2000–2001) 13 episodes of 60 minutes. Police action series.
- Año 400 (Canal Sur, 2008) 13 episodes of 60 minutes. Surreal historical comedy.
- Apaches (Antena 3, 2018) Thriller
- Apaga a luz (TVG, 1999) Comedy. Galician.
- Aquí hay negocio (TVE, 1995) 13 episodes of 50 minutes. Comedy about the unsuccessful business of an unemployed man.
- Aquí me las den todas (Veo7, 2011) Comedy.
- Aquí no hay quien viva (Antena 3, 2003 – 2006) Comedy about a house and its inhabitants.
- Aquí Paz y después Gloria (Telecinco, 2015) A con man usurps the identity of his twin brother, a priest, to escape from mafia.
- Arnau (TV3, 1994) Miniseries of 5 episodes of 55 minutes. Historical. Set in the 11th century. (in Catalan)
- Arde Madrid (Movistar+, 2018–present) During Francoist Spain actress Ava Gardner is spied.
- Arrayán (Canal Sur, 2001–2013) About a hotel.
- Arròs covat (El 33, 2009–2012) Animation. A graphic designer is dumped by his girlfriend. (in Catalan)
- Arroz y tartana (TVE, 2003) Miniseries of two episodes of 60 minutes. Adaptation of the novel by Vicente Blasco Ibáñez.
- As leis de Celavella (TVG, 2003–2004) Mystery series. (in Galician)
- Ascensores (Paramount Comedy, 2007–2008) Comedy. Sketches set in an elevator.
- El asesinato de Carrero Blanco (TVE, 2012) Miniseries of 2 episodes about the murder of Luis Carrero Blanco.
- As leis de Celavella (TVG, 2003) Police series set in Santiago de Compostela in 1925. (in Galician)
- Los Aurones (TVE, 1987) 26 episodes of 30 minutes. Puppet animation. The evil king Grog is always trying to steal to the Aurones their gold but always fails.
- Ausias March (Canal Nou, 2004) Miniseries of two episodes of 90 minutes. Biopic of the Valencian poet. (in Valencian)
- Las auténticas aventuras del profesor Thompson (TVE, 1992–1994) 26 episodes of 25 minutes. Animation. Professor Thompson and the Russian Boris are time- travellers.
- El auténtico Rodrigo Leal (Antena 3, 2005) 81 episodes of 25 minutes. Soap opera about a man who pretends to be gay in a reality show.
- Avenida de América (TVG, 2012) Series about the students of a hostelry school. 80 episodes. (in Galician)
- Aventuras de Molécula (TVE, 1968) 13 episodes of 6 minutes. Animation. Molécula lives science fiction adventures.
- Las aventuras de Pepe Carvalho (TVE, 1986) 8 episodes of 50 minutes. Detective series.
- Aventuras y desventuras de Mateo (TVE, 1972) 25 episodes of 30 minutes. Mateo is a normal man with very bad luck.
- Les aventures de Pol Nord (TV3, 1990) 13 episodes of 30 minutes. Youth action series. (in Catalan)
- L'avi Bernat (Canal 33, 1989) 13 episodes of 25 minutes. Comedy about a widower. (in Catalan)
- Avui per demà (TV3, 1991–1992) 13 episodes of 40 minutes. Comedy about a married man who receives the visit of his aunt Hortensia. (in Catalan)
- ¡Ay, Señor, Señor! (Antena 3, 1994–1995) Comedy about an open-minded priest who lives with a more traditional one.

== B ==
- Bai Horixe (ETB, 1989) 30 episodes of 30 minutes. Series to teach (in Basque).
- El baile (TVE, 1985) Miniseries of 6 episodes of 50 minutes. Adaptation of a play of Edgar Neville.
- Bajo el mismo techo (TVE, 1970) 13 episodes of 50 minutes. Series about the family.
- Bajo sospecha (Antena 3, 2015 – 2016) Laura and Víctor are two police agents who have to pose as a romantic couple in order to investigate the disappearance of a little girl.
- Una bala para el Rey (Antena 3, 2009) Miniseries of 2 episodes of 50 minutes. Series about the 2005 attempt of assassination of Spanish king Juan Carlos I .
- Balbemendi (ETB, 2006–2008) 27 episodes of 50 minutes. Mystery. (in Basque)
- Balín (TVE, 1992–1993) 300 episodes of 20 seconds. Animation. A mouse lives in the drains of the city.
- La banda de Mozart (TVE, 1992) 26 episodes of 30 minutes. Animation. About some kids fans of classic music.
- La banda de Pérez (TVE, 1997) 26 episodes of 55 minutes. Comedy about a military music group set in the Spanish civil war. Adaptation of the film ¡Biba la banda!.
- Bandolera (Antena 3, 2011) 50/70 minutes. Soap opera set in Andalusia in the 19th century.
- Bandolero (Canal Sur, 2002) 52 episodes of 26 minutes. Animation. Adventures of the bandit Curro en in the Andalucía of the 19th century.
- El barco (Antena 3, 2011 – 2013) Science fiction about the crew of a school-ship who survives a global cataclysm.
- La barraca (TVE, 1979) Miniseries of 9 episodes of 60 minutes. Adaptation of a Blasco Ibáñez novel.
- Barras (Antena Neox/Antena 3, 2008) 65 gags of 40 seconds. Comedy starring the bars of the test card.
- Basauri Vice (TNT, 2011) Surreal comedy about two policeman.
- Basket Fever (TVE, 2002) 26 episodes of 22 minutes. Animation. A grasshopper joins the basket team of a group of dogs.
- Bec@rios (La Siete, 2008–2011) Comedy about a group of stipends set in front of a photocopier.
- La bella Otero (TV3/TVG/Antena 3, 2008) Miniseries of 3 episodes of 60 minutes. Biopic.
- Benifotrem (Canal Nou, 1995) 13 episodes of 60 minutes. Series about a team of television journalists. (in Valencian)
- Benta berri (ETB, 1997–1998) 105 episodes of 20 minutes. Comedy about an agro-tourism center. (in Basque)
- Benvinguts a la família (TV3, 2018–present) 26 episodes of 50 minutes. Comedy about a dysfunctional mixed family (in Catalan)
- Bi eta bat (ETB, 1991–1993) 26 episodes of 30 minutes. Comedy about three young people that share a flat in San Sebastián. (in Basque)
- Bicho malo (nunca muere) (Antena Neox, 2009) Comedy about some thirty-somethings that share a flat and receive the visits of the ghost of another friend.
- Bienvenidos al Lolita (Antena 3, 2014) Series set in a cabaret.
- Blasco Ibáñez, la novela de su vida (TVE, 1997) Miniseries of 2 episodes of 90 minutes. Biopic.
- El Bloke. Coslada Cero (TVE, 2009) Miniseries of 2 episodes of 75 minutes. Series based on a police corruption case in Coslada.
- Boca Norte (playz, 2019) Miniseries of 6 episodes. Teen drama.
- El bosc de Gari-Gori (TV3, 1987–1988) 26 episodes of 20 minutes. Puppet animation. A forest with a happy zone and a scary one. (in Catalan)
- El botones Sacarino (TVE, 2000) 8 episodes of 55 minutes. Comedy. Adaptation of the comic strip of the same name.
- Brigada Central (TVE, 1989–1990) 14 episodes of 50 minutes. Detective series.
- Brigada Central II: La guerra blanca (TVE, 1992) 12 episodes of 50 minutes. Detective series. Sequel of the latter focusing on drug trafficking.
- Brigada Costa del Sol (Telecinco, 2019–present) 13 episodes of 70 minutes. Police series.
- La bruja aburrida (TV3) Animation. Spin off of Las tres mellizas.
- BuenAgente (La Sexta, 2011) Comedy about a policeman and his family.
- Buenas noches, señores (TVE, 1972) 14 episodes of 30 minutes. Comedy of manners.
- Un burka por amor (Antena 3, 2009) Miniseries of 2 episodes of 70 minutes. A Spanish woman marries an Afghan and her passport is stolen in Afghanistan.
- Buscando el norte (Antena 3, 2016): Comedy about a group of Spaniards who emigrate to Germany.
- Buscavidas (Antena 3,1991) 26 episodes of 60 minutes. Difficulties of an Argentine immigrant in Madrid.
- B&B, de boca en boca (Telecinco, 2014–2015) Series about the workers of a fashion magazine.

== C ==
- Café con leche (TVE Internacional, 1998) 13 episodes of 50 minutes. Comedy about a Spaniard and a Domician living in a humble district of Madrid.
- Cafetería Manhattan (Antena 3, 2007) 25 episodes of 30 minutes. Comedy set in a café.
- Calle nueva (TVE, 1997–2000) 560 episodes of 30 minutes. Soap opera set in a humble district.
- Cambio de clase (TVE/Disney Channel, 2006–2010) Comedy about a group of students.
- Camera café (Telecinco, 2000–2009) 530 sketches of 4–5 minutes. Comedy set in an office in front of a coffee vending machine.
- Café express (Telemadid/Canal 9, 2000) Comedy. Predecessor of Camera café.
- El camino (TVE, 1978) Miniseries of 5 episodes of 30 minutes. Adaptation of a Miguel Delibes novel.
- Camino de Santiago (Antena 3, 1999) Miniseries of 3 episodes of 90 minutes. Mystery.
- Los camioneros (TVE, 1973–1974) 13 episodes of 45 minutes. Series about lorry-drivers.
- Campamento Albanta (Atresplayer Premium, 2020) 6 episodes of 25 minutes. Supernatural thriller set in a camp.
- Campus (ETB, 2001) 15 episodes of 40 minutes. Comedy about some university students.
- Canal privado (TVE, 1989–1991) Comedy set in a fictional TV channel. Included in the program Pero…¿esto qué es?.
- Candel (TV3, 1987) 7 episodes of 25 minutes. Series about immigration in Catalonia.
- Canguros (Antena 3, 1994–1995) 45 episodes of 45 minutes. Comedy about a babysitter and her flatmates.
- Cañas y barro (TVE, 1978) Miniseries of 6 episodes of 60 minutes. Adaptation of a Vicente Blasco Ibáñez novel.
- Capítulo 0 (#0, 2019) Parody of different TV series genres.
- Cardo (Atresplayer Premium, 2021) 6 episodes. Drama.
- Carlos, Rey Emperador (La 1, 2015–2016) Biopic of Charles V, Holy Roman Emperor.
- Carme i David, cuina, menjador i llit (TV3, 1984) 13 episodes of 25 minutes. Comedy about an ex-couple whose members decide to live together again. (in Catalan)
- Carmen y familia (TVE, 1996) 26 episodes of 50 minutes. Comedy about a tobacconist, her brother and her boyfriend.
- Carmina (Telecinco, 2012) Miniseries of 2 episodes. Biopic of Carmina Ordóñez.
- Caronte (Amazon Prime Video, 2020) legal drama of 13 episodes.
- Carta a Eva (TVE, 2013) Miniseries of two episodes. Eva Perón visits the Francoist Spain.
- Lo Cartanyà (TV3, 2005–2007) 39 episodes of 25 minutes. Comedy set in a village of Lleida.
- La casa de los líos (Antena 3, 1996–2000) 136 episodes of 50 minutes. Comedy.
- Casa Manola (TVG, 2014–present) Comedy set in a village hostel. (in Galician)
- La casa de los Martínez (TVE, 1967–1971) 300 episodes of 30/60 minutes. Comedy/musical show starring the titular family.
- La casa de papel (Antena 3, 2017) 8 people plan a heist in the Royal Mint of Spain
- Casa para dos (Telecinco, 1995) 13 episodes of 50 minutes. Comedy about a couple of actors.
- Casi perfectos (Antena 3, 2004–2005) 23 episodes of 50 minutes. Family comedy.
- El Caso: Crónica de sucesos (TVE, 2016) Series based on the 1950s cime specialized newspaper El Caso
- El caso Wanninkhof (TVE, 2008) Miniseries of 2 episodes of 75 minutes. Based on the real-life case of assassination of Rocío Wanninkhof.
- El castigo (Antena 3, 2008) Miniseries of 2 episodes of 80 minutes. Based in a real-life case. A group of conflict young people are captured and tortured in a secret site.
- La caza. Monteperdido (La 1, 2019) 8 episodes. Thriller set in the Pyrenees.
- La caza. Tramuntana (La 1, 2021) 8 episodes. Sequel to La caza. Monteperdido.
- Cazadores de hombres (Antena 3, 2008) 8 episodes of 75 minutes. Police series.
- La Celestina (TVE, 1982) Miniseries of 3 episodes of 85 minutes. Adaptation of the novel of Fernando de Rojas.
- Celia (TVE, 1992) 6 episodes of 45 minutes. Drama set in the 1930s and starring a bourgeois 7-year-old girl.
- Cervantes (TVE, 1982) 9 episodes of 90 minutes. Biopic of Miguel de Cervantes.
- Chapa e pintura (TVG, 2013–2014) Comediy about a street with several small business. (in Galician)
- Check-in hotel (Canal Nou, 2009–2010) Comedy set in a hotel.
- Cheers (Telecinco, 2011) Spanish version of Cheers.
- La chica de ayer (Antena 3, 2009) 8 episodes of 70 minutes. Police series/Science fiction. Spanish version of Life on Mars.
- Las chicas de hoy en día (TVE, 1991–1992) 26 episodes of 50 minutes. Comedy about two girls who go to Madrid to become actresses.
- Las chicas del cable (Netflix, 2017–present) Series about a group of switchboard operators set in 1928.
- Las chicas de oro (TVE, 2010) 25 episodes of 50 minutes. Comedy. Spanish adaptation of The Golden Girls.
- Chicas en la ciudad (TVE, 1961) 15 episodes of 15 minutes. Series about the friendship of four girls. Spin-off of Mujeres solas.
- Chiringuito de Pepe (Telecinco, 2014–2016) A renowned chef tries to save a dilapidated beach snack bar.
- Un chupete para ella (Antena 3, 2000–2001) 27 episodes of 60 minutes. Comedy about a womanizer who one day finds a baby left in his house.
- Ciudad K (La 2, 2010) 14 episodes of 25 minutes. Gag series about a city where all people have an absurdly high cultural level.
- Ciega a citas (Cuatro, 2014) An overweight hairdresser makes a bet with her mother that she will go to her sister's wedding with a boyfriend.
- Círculo rojo (Antena 3, 2007) 12 episodes of 80 minutes. Detective series.
- Ciudad Sur (Antena 3, 2001) 40 episodes of 25 minutes. Soap opera.
- C.L.A. No somos ángeles (Antena 3/Antena Nova, 2007) 59 episodes of 40 minutes. Hospital drama.
- Clara Campoamor, la mujer olvidada (TVE, 2011) Miniseries of 2 episodes of 45 minutes. Life of feminist Clara Campoamor.
- Clase media (TVE, 1987) 8 episodes of 50 minutes. A family man is forced to move from the village to the city by the local cacique.
- Les claus de vidre (TV3, 1989) 13 episodes of 12 minutes. Detective series. After each episode, there was a quiz in which the contestants tried to solve the mystery. (in Catalan)
- The Cobi Trouppe (TV3, 1992) 26 episodes of 30 minutes. Animation starring Barcelona 92 pet Cobi. (in Catalan)
- La cocinera de Castamar (Atresplayer Premium, 2021) 12 episodes. Romantic drama in early 18th-century Spain.
- Código fuego (Antena 3, 2003) 19 episodes of 50 minutes (only 3 aired). Drama about a group of firemen.
- Colegas (playz, 2017–2018) 6 episodes of 20 minutes. Dramedy.
- Colegio mayor (Telemadrid, 1993) 12 episodes of 25 minutes. Series set in a college.
- Colegio mayor II (TVE/Canal Nou/Euskal Telebista 1996) 26 episodes of 25 minutes. Sequel of Colegio mayor.
- La comedia musical española (TVE, 1985) 13 episodes of 120 minutes. Musicals of Celia Gámez.
- El comisario (Telecinco, 1999–2009) 189 episodes of 70 minutes. Police drama.
- Como el perro y el gato (TVE, 2007) 4 episodes of 50 minutes. Comedy about a cheeky man, his monk brother and the rest of the family.
- Compañera te doy (TVE, 1973) 13 episodes of 25 minutes. Comedy about romantic relationships among history.
- Compañeros (Antena 3, 1998–2002) 121 episodes of 70 minutes. About the students of an institute.
- Compuesta y sin novio (Antena 3, 1994) 13 episodes of 50 minutes. Valentina thinks that she is not going to find love after she is abandoned in her wedding.
- Con dos tacones (TVE, 2006) 11 episodes of 50 minutes. Comedy about five women who decide to live together after some problems with men.
- Con el culo al aire (Antena 3, 2012–) episodes of 20 minutes. Comedy set in camping.
- El conde de Montecristo (TVE, 1969) Miniseries of 20 episodes of 45 minutes. Based on the Alexandre Dumas novel The Count of Monte Cristo.
- Condenadas a entenderse (Antena 3, 1999) 13 episodes of 50 minutes. Comedy about two cousins with different personalities that work together.
- Confidencias (TVE, 1963–1965) 50 episodes of 25 minutes. Non related plots about daily life.
- Contigo pan y cebolla (TVE, 1997) 13 episodes of 50 minutes. Comedy. Spanish versión of The Honeymooners .
- El Continental (La 1, 2018) Set in a clandestine pub in the 1920s
- El cor de la ciutat (TV3, 2000–2009) Soap opera. (in Catalan)
- El corazón del océano (Antena 3, 2014) 6 episodes. Historical drama and adventure series.
- La corona mágica (TVE, 1989–1990) 26 episodes of 20 minutes. Animation. Fantasy/Science fiction series.
- Corta-T (Cuatro, 2005) 9 episodes of 30 minutes. Youth series.
- Cosas de dos (TVE, 1984) 13 episodes of 30 minutes. Comedy about a couple formed by a photographer and an actress.
- Crematorio (Canal +, 2011) About political corruption.
- Crims (TV3, 2000) 13 episodes of 60 minutes. Detective series. (in Catalan)
- Cristina y los hombres (TVE, 1969) 13 episodes of 30 minutes. Comedy.
- Cristóbal Colón (TVE, 1967) Miniseries of 4 episodes of 50 minutes. Biopic of Cristóbal Colón.
- Crónica del alba (TVE, 1982) Miniseries of 4 episodes of 60 minutes. Based on the novel by Ramón J. Sender.
- Crónica negra (TV3, 1988–1989) 13 episodes of 30 minutes. Detective series.
- Crónicas de un pueblo (TVE, 1971–1974) 114 episodes of 50 minutes. Series set in a village.
- Crónicas del mal (TVE, 1991) 13 episodes of 50 minutes. Horror series.
- Crónicas urbanas (TVE, 1990) 24 episodes of 55 minutes. Plots based on pieces of news.
- Cuando ellas veranean (TVE, 1960) 10 episodes of 15 minutes. About the summer vacations of some women.
- ¡Cuando puedas! (Canal Extremadura Televisión, 2008–2009) Gag series set in a bar.
- Cuarto de estar (TVE, 1963–1966) 52 episodes of 25 minutes. About a young female journalist.
- Cuenta atrás (Cuatro, 2007–2008) 29 episodes of 50/60 minutes. Police series.
- Cuéntame cómo pasó (TVE, 2001–present) Series set in 1968 and beyond.
- Cuéntame un cuento (Antena 3, 2014) Retelling of fairy tales in modern settings.
- Los cuentos de Borges (La 2, 1993) 6 episodes of 60 minutes. Adaptation of 6 tales of Jorge Luis Borges.
- Cuentos imposibles (TVE, 1984) 6 episodes of 60 minutes. Fantasy/comedy series.
- Cuentos para mayores (TVE, 1958–1959) 25 episodes of 30 minutes. Fantasy/comedy series.
- Cuentos populares europeos (TVE, 1986–1987) 12 episodes dof 90 minutes. Adaptations of fairy tales.
- Cuentos y leyendas (La 2, 1972–1975) 26 episodes of 55 minutes. Adaptations of fantasy Works of Spanish literatura.
- Cuerpo de élite (Antena 3, 2018) 13 episodes. Comedy series about an elite law enforcement unit.
- Cuestión de sexo (Cuatro, 2007–2009) 34 episodes of 50 minutes. Comedy about the romantic/sexual relationships of a group of friends.
- Curro Jiménez (TVE, 1977–1978) 40 episodes of 50 minutes. Adventures of a 19th-century bandit.
- Curro Jiménez, el regreso de una leyenda (Antena 3, 1995) 12 episodes. Sequel of Curro Jiménez.

== D ==
- D’Artacan y los tres mosqueperros (TVE, 1981) 26 episodes of 25 minutes. Animated series based on The Three Musketeers.
- La dama velada (Telecinco, 2015) 12 episodes de 55 minutes. Italian-Spanish international co-production. Romance series set in the 19th century.
- La Dársena de Poniente (TVE, 2006–2007) 20 episodes of 50 minutes. Suspense and romance starring Bazán family.
- David, el gnomo (TVE, 1987–1988) 26 episodes of 25 minutes. Animation. Adventures of a gnome with magical powers.
- De moda (FORTA, 2004–2005) 13 episodes of 60 minutes. Comedy set in a boutique.
- ¿De parte de quién? (TVE, 1993) 13 episodes of 30 minutes. Comedy written by Miguel Gila.
- De profesió A.P.I. (TV3, 1988–1990) 26 episodes of 30 minutes. Family comedy. (in Catalan)
- De repente, los Gómez (Telecinco, 2009) 2 episodes of 60 minutes. Comedy about a family of thieves that accidentally witness a mafia assassination.
- De tal Paco, tal astilla (Telecinco, 1997) 4 episodes of 50 minutes. Comedy.
- Del dicho al hecho (TVE, 1971) 12 episodes of 30 minutes. Comedy with unrelated plots based on sayings.
- Delfy y sus amigos (TVE, 1992) 91 episodes of 25 minutes. Animated series about a dolphin.
- Delirios de amor (TVE, 1989) 13 episodes of 60 minutes. Romance.
- Des del balcó (TV3, 2001) 3 episodes of 30 minutes. Series set in the beginning of the 20th century. (in Catalan)
- Desaparecida (TVE, 2007–2008) 13 episodes of 90 minutes. Mystery about a missing girl.
- Desaparecidos (Amazon Prime Video, 2020–) 13 episodes. Police procedural about missing people.
- Los desastres de la guerra (TVE, 1985) 6 episodes of 60 minutes. Series set in the Spanish Independence War.
- Desenlace (Antena 3, 2002) 13 episodes (7 aired) of 40 minutes. Independent plots about mystery and violence.
- El desván de la fantasía (TVE, 1978) 8 episodes of 20 minutes. Animation. A grandfather and his nieces imagine adventures in a loft.
- El detective Bogey (TVE, 1978) 52 episodes of 25 minutes. Animation. Adventures of a worm detective.
- Deudas (Atresplayer Premium, 2021) 13 episodes. Comedy about the rivalry between two families.
- El día de mañana (Movistar+, 2018–present) About an immigrant in Francoist Spain
- El día que me quieras (La 2, 1994) 11 episodes of 55 minutes. Unrelated plots about love relationships.
- Un día volveré (TVE, 1993) Miniseries of 6 episodes of 60 minutes. Adaptation of a book of Juan Marsé.
- Diálogos de un matrimonio (TVE, 1982) 13 episodes of 30 minutes. Comedy about a married couple.
- Diana en negro (TVE, 1970) 11 episodes of 50 minutes. Police series.
- Diarios de la cuarentena (TVE, 2020) sketch series about the 2020 Spain coronavirus lockdown.
- Els diaris de Pascal (TV3, 2008) 8 episodes of 30 minutes. Mockumentary about a French photographer in the Second Republic.
- Días sin luz (TV3, 2008) Miniseries of 2 episodes of 75 minutes. Series about the real-life case of assassination of the child Mariluz Cortés.
- Dichoso mundo (TVE, 1966–1967) 12 episodes of 25 minutes. Series starring Conchita Montes.
- Diego Valor (TVE, 1958) 20 episodes of 25 minutes. Science fiction comedy.
- Diez en Ibiza (TVE, 2004) 13 episodes of 80 minutes. Adventures of two families in Ibiza.
- Dime que me quieres (Antena 3, 2001) 13 episodes of 60 minutes. Sentimental life o fan ex couple.
- Divinos (Antena 3, 2006) 5 episodes of 70 minutes. Comedy about a paparazzi.
- El Divo (Paramount Comedy, 2011) episodes of 21 minutes. Comedy about a former TV star in decline who presents a program on a local channel.
- La doce caras de Eva (TVE, 1967) 12 episodes of 25 minutes. 12 women with different horoscopes live in a prison.
- La doce caras de Juan (TVE, 1967) 13 episodes of 25 minutes. 12 men called Juan with different horoscopes.
- Doce cuentos y una pesadilla (La 2 (UHF), 1967) 13 episodes of 60 minutes. Horror series.
- Doce lecciones de felicidad conyugal (La 2 (UHF), 1969) 12 episodes of 30 minutes.
- Doctor Mateo (Antena 3, 2009 – 2011) Comedy about a somewhat snob doctor who goes to work in a village of Asturias.
- Don Baldomero y su gente (TVE, 1982) 13 episodes of 30 minutes. Comedy about a bankrupted marquees who has to live with some hippies.
- El don de Alba (Telecinco, 2013) About a young girl that can see ghosts.
- Don José, Pepe y Pepito (TVE, 1965) 6 episodes of 30 minutes. A family receive the visit of a girl.
- Don Juan (TVE, 1997) Miniseries of 2 episodes of 90 minutes. Adaptation of Don Juan Tenorio.
- Don Quijote (TVE, 1965) Miniseries of 4 episodes of 80 minutes. Adaptation of Don Quixote.
- Don Quijote de la Mancha (TVE, 1979) 39 episodes of 25 minutes. Animation. Adaptation of Don Quixote.
- Dones d’aigua (TV3, 1997–1998) 13 episodes of 45 minutes. Drama set in a spa. (in Catalan)
- Dorien (playz, 2017–2018) 5 episodes. Horror fiction.
- Dos de mayo, la libertad de una nación (Telemadrid, 2008) 22 episodes of 75 minutes. Series about the Spanish Independence War.
- Dos en la ciudad (TVE, 1965) 13 episodes of 30 minutes. Series about the residents of the city.
- Dos + Una (Antena 3, 2001) 13 episodes of 25 minutes. Comedy about 3 sisters in both the series and real life.
- Dos vidas (TVE, 2021– ). Soap opera set in two different timelines.
- Douguie in disguise (TV3, 2006–present) Animation. Preschool series about a boy and his dog. (in Catalan)
- Drama (playz, 2020) 6 episodes of 25 minutes. Comedy. (in Catalan) and Spanish
- Drama en negro (TVE, 1970) 5 episodes of 50 minutes. Mystery series.
- Dreamland (Cuatro, 2014) About an artist school.
- La Duquesa (Telecinco, 2010) Miniseries of 2 episodes about Duchess of Alba. It spawned a sequel La Duquesa II (Telecinco, 2011) 2 episodes.

== E ==
- El Dorado (TVE, 1988) Miniseries of 3 episodes of 60 minutes. Series about the Aguirre's search of El Dorado.
- El Pescado Frito (Oromar, 2025) Six episodes narrating the story of a group of transsexual women in a picantería in Guayaquil, recognized for its famous fried fish recipe
- Élite (Netflix, 2018–present) Three young men receive a scholarship for a prestigious institute
- Ell i ella (TV3, 2001) 38 episodes of 5 minutes. Gag series about romantic relationships. (in Catalan)
- Ella es tu padre (Telecinco, 2017) A divorced man pretends to be a woman music teacher to spend more time with his children
- Ell@s (Antena 3, 2009) Episodes of 15 minutes. Series about young people.
- Ellas son así (Telecinco, 1999) 13 episodes of 60 minutes. Comedy about four sisters that own a restaurant.
- Ellas y el sexo débil (Antena 3, 2006) 4 episodes of 75 minutes. Very unsuccessful comedy about five women taking revenge on men.
- Els Bobobobs (TV3, 1988–1989) 26 episodes of 30 minutes. Animation. Science fiction adventures. (in Catalan)
- Els grau (TV3, 1988–1989) 31 episodes of 10 minutes. The Grau family talk about TV programs. (in Catalan)
- La embajada (Antena 3, 2016 – present) Suspense about the family of a Spanish ambassador in Thailand.
- El embarcadero (Movistar+, 2019–present) After the suicide of her husband, a woman discovers he had a double life
- En plena forma (Antena 3, 1997) 13 episodes of 50 minutes. Comedy about a cook who opens a gym.
- Un encargo original (TVE, 1983) 13 episodes of 50 minutes. Adaptations of Spanish literature classics.
- Los encuentros (TVE, 1966–1967) 26 episodes of 80 minutes. Drama with unrelated episode plots.
- Las enfermeras (TVE, 1963) 13 episodes of 50 minutes. Drama about a group of nurses.
- Enigma (TVE, 1963–1964) 13 episodes of 50 minutes. Mystery series.
- Entre dos fuegos (ETB, 1998) 66 episodes of 90 minutes. The life of a woman changes a lot when her husband dies.
- Entre naranjos (TVE, 1998) Miniseries of 3 episodes of 90 minutes. Adaptation of a Vicente Blasco Ibáñez novel.
- Equipo de vuelo (TVE, 1964) 13 episodes of 30 minutes. Drama
- Érase una vez (TVE, 1958–1959) 100 episodes of 15 minutes. Ironic adaptations of fairy tales.
- Érase una vez las tres mellizas (TV3) Animation. Sequel of Las tres mellizas.
- Era visto! (TVG, 2011) Series set on a traditional Galician village. (in Galician)
- ¿Es usted el asesino? (TVE, 1967) 9 episodes of 45 minutes. Detective series.
- Esa clase de gente (TVE, 1990) 6 episodes of 30 minutes. Misadventures of the employees of the company Indeconsa.
- Escalera interior, escalera exterior (TVE, 1986) 13 episodes of 30 minutes. Comedy about neighbour's relationships.
- Escenas de matrimonio (Telecinco, 2007–2009) 30/45 minutes. Gag series about three married couples. It spawned a sequel Escenas de matrimonio 2.
- Escoba! (TVG, 2011–2014) Episodes of 25 minutes. (in Galician)
- Escrito en América (TVE, 1979) 10 episodes f 50 minutes. Adaptatipns of Latinoamerican written works.
- Escritores en televisión (La 2 (UHF), 1968–1969) 13 episodes of 50 minutes. A group of book writers were invited to collaborate on TV script.
- Escuela de maridos (TVE 1963–1965) 26 episodes of 50 minutes. Satire about the manners of some husbands.
- Esencia de poder (Telecinco, 2001) 121 episodes of 25 minutes. Soap opera.
- El español y los siete pecados capitales (TVE, 1980) 7 episodes of 40 minutes. Analysis of the Spaniard by observing the seven cardinal sins.
- Esposados (Telecinco, 2013) Sketch comedy about three married couples.
- Estació d’enllaç (TV3, 1994–1998) 140 episodes of 45 minutes. Series set in an unrdenground/train station. (in Catalan)
- Estados alterados Maitena (La Sexta, 2008–2010) Episodes of 30 minutes. Adaptation of Maitena's comics strips.
- Este es mi barrio (Antena 3, 1996) 31 episodes of 50 minutes. Series set in a humble district.
- Este señor de negro (TVE, 1975–1976) 31 episodes of 50 minutes. Comedy about a reactionary and his problems with modern life.
- Esto no es serio ¿o sí? (ETB2, 2007–2008) Gag series.
- Estoy vivo (La 1, 2017 – present) a murdered policeman comes back to live in another body
- Estudio galerías (TVE, 1960) 13 episodes of 30 minutes.
- Las estupendas (Telecinco, 2009) Sketches of 2 minutes about 3 girls in love with their roommate.
- Eurocops (TVE, 1988–1993) 70 episodes of 50 minutes. European Police series.
- Euskolegas (ETB, 2009–2010) episodes of 45 minutes. Comedy about a group of Basque friends.
- Eva a las diez (TVE, 1977) Miniseries of 5 episodes of 50 minutes.
- Eva frente al espejo (TVE, 1970) 6 episodes of 45 minutes. A woman examines her life.
- Eva y Adán, agencia matrimonial (TVE, 1990) 26 episodes of 30 minutes. Comedy about a partner-finding business.
- Eva y Kolegas (Antena Neox, 2008) 30 episodes of 10 minutes. Mystery/comedy series.
- Evita Percances (Canal Sur, 2008) 52 episodes of 7 minutes. Animation. A child called Evita Percances shows how to avoid domestic accidents.
- Los exitosos Pells (Cuatro, 2009) 6 episodes of 30 minutes. Comedy about some television news presenters.

== F ==
- Fábulas (TVE, 1968) 26 episodes of 30 minutes. Loose adaptations of fables.
- Fago (TVE, 2008) Miniseries of 2 episodes of 70 minutes. Miniseries based on the real-life assassination of the major of Fago.
- Familia (Telecinco, 2013) Family series.
- La familia (TVE, 1991–1996) Sketches about a married couple included in the magazine Pasa la vida.
- La familia Colón (TVE, 1967) 10 episodes of 30 minutes. About an Argentinian family living in Spain.
- La familia Mata (Antena 3, 2007–2009) 36 episodes of 70–80 minutes. Family comedy.
- Famosos y familias (TVE, 1999) 9 episodes of 50 minutes. Comedy about a married couple. She is a screenwriter and he is a film director.
- Farmacia de guardia (Antena 3, 1991–1995) 156 episodes of 30 minutes. Very successful comedy about a pharmacist and her family.
- Fariña (Antena 3, 2018 – present) About Galician drug dealer Sito Miñanco
- Felipe y Letizia (Telecinco, 2010) Miniseries of 2 episodes about the early relationship of Felipe, Prince of Asturias and Letizia Ortiz.
- Félix (#0, 2018– present) A man falls in love with a Chinese woman who mysteriously disappears
- Fenómenos (Antena 3, 2012– 2013) Comedy about the workers of a radio show dedicated to paranormal phenomena.
- Fernández, punto y coma (TVE, 1963–1965) 13 episodes of 25 minutes. A rich man decides to write his memories, without prejudices.
- Fernández y familia (Telecinco, 1998) 23 episodes of 25 minutes Comedy about a soccer referee and his family.
- Fernando Amezketarra (ETB, 1994) Episodes of 10 minutes. Animation. Series about bertsolari Fernando Amezketarra.
- Fetiche (TVE, 1996) 6 episodes of 30 minutes. Mockumentary in which Lola Baldrich tells about daily life objects.
- Fibrilando (Telecinco, 2009) 8 episodes of 4/5 minutes. Gag series set in an operating room. Sequel of Camera café.
- Ficciones (TVE, 1971–1981) Episodes of 60 minutes. Adaptations of literary tales.
- La fiebre del oro (TVE, 1993) Miniseries of 3 episodes of 100 minutes. Banking businesses of a family of the Catalan bourgeoisie.
- El fin de la comedia (Comedy Central, 2014) Series about a comedian
- El final del camino (La 1, 2017) Series set in the 11th century.
- Fíos (TVG, 2002) Comedy set in a textile company. (in Galician)
- Firmado Pérez (TVE, 1963) 13 episodes of 25 minutes. Comedy about a wannabe journalist.
- Física o química (Antena 3, 2008–2011) Series about a group of young students.
- El flechazo (TVE, 1990) 5 episodes of 30 minutes. Some couples get distanced.
- Flor de mayo (Canal Nou, 2009) Miniseries of 2 episodes of 90 minutes. Adaptation of a Vicente Blasco Ibáñez novel.
- La forastera (À Punt, 2019–present) Comedy about a city woman in a rural zone of Valencia. (in Catalan)
- La forja de un rebelde (TVE, 1990) Miniseries of 6 episodes of 100 minutes. Biopic of Arturo Barea.
- La Fortuna (Movistar+, 2021) Miniseries of 6 episodes. Adventure/drama.
- Fortunata y Jacinta (TVE, 1980) Miniseries of 10 episodes of 60 minutes. Based on the Benito Pérez Galdós novel.
- Frágiles (Telecinco, 2012–2013). A physical therapist wants to reduce the pain, both physical and emotional, of their patients.
- Fragmentos del interior (TVE, 1984) Miniseries of 4 episodes of 60 minutes. Based on a Camen Martín Gaite novel.
- Los Fruittis (TVE, 1990–1992) 91 episodes of 22 minutes. Animation. Adventures of a village of anthropomorphic fruits.
- Fuera de control (TVE, 2006) 12 episodes of 50 minutes. Comedy about the experiences of a group of professionals working in "Directo 24", a magazine published daily.
- Fuera de lugar (TVE, 2008) 11 episodes of 50 minutes. A lawyer loses everything he has in a day.
- Fuerza (Antena 3, 1992) 22 episodes of 55 minutes. Series set in a training center for future Olympic athletes.
- La fuga (Telecinco, 2012) In a near future a woman tries to help her husband escape from a prison in the middle of the sea.
- Fugitiva (La 1, 2018) Thriller
- Futuro:48 horas (Antena 3, 2008) Miniseries of 2 episodes of 75 minutes. About the abduction and murder of Miguel Angel Blanco.

== G ==
- Gavilanes (Antena 3, 2010–2011) Soap opera (adaptation of Pasión de gavilanes)
- Galactic Gym (TNT, 2011) Surreal comedy about an anthropomorphic dog that owns a gym.
- Galería de mujeres (TVE, 1960–1961) 50 episodes of 15 minutes. In each episode, the portrait of a relationship from the perspective of different women personalities. Sequel of Galería de maridos.
- Galería de maridos (TVE, 1959–1960) 50 episodes of 15 minutes. Difficulties of several different types of marriages with different kinds of husbands.
- Galicia exprés (TVG, 2001) 61 episodes of 30 minutes. A group of young runners.
- Gatos en el tejado (TVE, 1988) 13 episodes of 60 minutes. Emotional life of a frustrated middle-aged comedian.
- Géminis, venganza de amor (TVE, 2002–2003) 162 episodes of 45 minutes. Soap opera.
- Generación d.F. (después de Franco) (Antena 3, 2008) 6 episodes of 25 minutes. Life of a group of young people.
- Génesis, en la mente del asesino (Cuatro, 2006–2007) 22 episodes of 50 minutes. Spooky police series.
- La gira (Disney Channel, 2006–2007) 26 episodes of 10 minutes. Comedy about a youth music gang.
- Una gloria nacional (TVE, 1994) 10 episodes of 60 minutes. A retired actor is faced with a performance.
- Goenkale (ETB, 1994–2015) 30–60 minutes. Soap opera set in a fictional town in Euskadi. (in Basque)
- Un golpe de suerte (Telecinco, 2009) 60 episodes of 45 minutes. Angel, a young man going through an identity crisis, has to leave the place where he has lived for the past few years and move to live with his unknown father, Luis.
- Gominolas (Cuatro, 2007) 8 episodes of 30 minutes. Comedy about a group of former successful singer children who 20 years later are losers.
- El Gordo: una historia verdadera (Antena 3, 2010) Miniseries of 2 episodes. A family is involved in many problems after winning the lottery.
- Goya (TVE, 1984) Miniseries of 6 episodes of 50 minutes. Biopic of Francisco de Goya.
- Los gozos y las sombras (TVE, 1982) Miniseries of 13 episodes of 50 minutes. Adaptation of Los gozos y las sombras, a trilogy of novels by Gonzalo Torrente Ballester.
- Gran Hotel (Antena 3, 2011 – 2013) Mystery series set in a hotel in 1905.
- Gran Reserva (TVE, 2010–2013) About two winemaking families of Rioja
- Gran Reserva. El origen (TVE, 2013) Soap opera, prequel of Gran Reserva.
- Grasa (playz, 2020) 6 episodes of 25 minutes. Comedy-drama.
- La granja (TV3, 1980–1992) 117 episodes of 15–30 minutes. Series set in a farmville.
- El grupo (Telecinco, 2000–2001) 11 episodes of 70 minutes. Six people attend group therapy.
- Guante blanco (TVE, 2008) 8 episodes of 65–90 minutes. Police series.
- Gym Tony (Cuatro, 2014–present) Comedy set in a gym.

== H ==
- Habitación 508 (TVE, 1966) 13 episodes of 60 minutes. Series by Adolfo Marsillach.
- Habitación 503 (TVE, 1993) 40 episodes of 30 minutes. Comedy set in a hotel.
- Hache (2019–present). A woman works in a criminal organization
- Happy House (TV3, 2000) 13 episodes of 30 minutes. Comedy about a group of students who share a flat surrounded by okupas.
- Hasiberriak (ETB, 2002–2003) 104 episodes of 15 minutes. Soap opera, spin off of Goenkale. (in Basque)
- Hasta luego, cocodrilo (TVE, 1992) 5 episodes of 90 minutes. On New Year's Eve, a group of friends must prevent the suicide of Mario before the 12 strokes.
- Hay alguien ahí (Cuatro, 2009–2010) Horror series about a family in a haunted house.
- Hay que vivir (TVE, 2007) 5 episodes of 50 minutes. Reenactments of real-life heroic events.
- Herederos (TVE, 2007–2009) 36 episodes of 60 minutes. Problems of a rich family of bull owners.
- Herencia de sangre (Canal Nou, 1995) 100 episodes of 30 minutes. Soap opera.
- Hermanas (Telecinco, 1998) 26 episodes of 50 minutes. Comedy about 8 nuns.
- Hermanos (Telecinco, 2014) Two brothers are in love with the same girl.
- Hermanos de leche (Antena 3, 1994–1996) 52 episodes of 52/30 minutes. Two very different milk brothers share a flat.
- Hermanos y detectives (Telecinco, 2007–2009) 20 episodes of 60 minutes. Police series. A police inspector discovers that he has an intelligent half brother and must take care of him.
- Hermenegildo Pérez, para servirle (TVE, 1966) 13 episodes of 30 minutes. Comedy about a man who likes to help people.
- La hija de los lobos (La 2, 1991) Miniseries of 3 episodes of 90 minutes. Legend of Vanda a girl raised by the Huns.
- Una hija más (TVE, 1991) 20 episodes of 30 minutes. Comedy about a Spanish student in London and an English student in Spain.
- Hispania, la leyenda (Antena 3, 2010 – 2012) Historical drama set in the 2nd century BC.
- Història de Catalunya (TV3, 1988–1989) 39 episodes of 15 minutes. Animation. A dragon explains the history of Catalonia. (in Catalan)
- La historia de San Michele (TVE, 1964) Miniseries of 2 episodes of 30 minutes. Life of a facultative.
- Historias de hoy (TVE, 1967) 13 episodes of 60 minutes. Non-related drama episodes.
- Historias de Juan Español (TVE, 1972–1973) 29 episodes of 25 minutes. Comedy about a Spanish "average Joe".
- Historias de la puta mili (Telecinco, 1994) 13 episodes of 50 minutes. Comedy about the military service, adaptation of a comic strip.
- Historias de mi barrio (TVE, 1963–1964) 26 episodes of 30 minutes. Comedy about a demon that tries to be evil but is always helpful by mistake.
- Historias del otro lado I (TVE, 1991) 7 episodes of 70 minutes. Mystery and horror series with non-related plots.
- Historias del otro lado II (TVE, 1996) 6 episodes of 70 minutes. Sequel of the latter. Mystery and horror series with non-related plots.
- Historias naturales (TVE, 1967–1968) 13 episodes of 30 minutes. Surreal light-hearted comedy.
- Historias para no dormir (TVE, 1966–1982) 29 episodes of 30/60 minutes. Mystery, horror and fantasy series with non-related plots.
- Historias para no dormir (Amazon Prime Video, 2021). 6 episodes. Anthology horror series rebooting the 20th-century series of the same name.
- Historias robadas (Antena 3, 2012) Miniseries of 2 episodes. Series about two brothers separated at birth in a case of child trafficking in the Francoist regime.
- HIT (La 1, 2020), 10 episodes. Highschool drama.
- HKM (Cuatro, 2008–2009) 85 episodes of 30 minutes. A group of students who are very fond of their music.
- Holmes and Company (TVE, 1960–1961) 13 episodes. Comedy about a wannabe detective.
- El hombre de tu vida (La 1, 2016) comedy about a man working for a fraudulent dating service company.
- El hombre, ese desconocido (TVE, 1963) Miniseries of 5 episodes of 60 minutes.
- Los hombres de Paco (Antena 3, 2005–2010) 117 episodes of 80 minutes. Comedy about a group police officers.
- Homicidios (Telecinco, 2011) 12 episodes. Police series.
- Hospital (Antena 3, 1996) 9 episodes of 80 minutes. Hospital drama.
- Hospital central (Telecinco, 2000–2012) Drama set in a hospital.
- Hospital Valle Norte (TVE, 2019) 10 episodes. Drama set in a hospital.
- Hostal Royal Manzanares (TVE, 1996–1998) 73 episodes of 60 minutes. Comedy set in a boarding-house.
- Hoy llegó la primavera (TVE, 1963) 13 episodes of 25 minutes. Drama about a married couple.
- Hoy quiero confesar (Antena 3) Miniseries of 2 episodes. Life of a female flamenco singer.
- La huella del crimen (TVE, 1985) 6 episodes of 60/70 minutes. Re-enactments of real life Spanish assassinations.
- La huella del crimen 2 (TVE, 1991) 5 episodes of 60/70 minutes. Sequel of the latter. Re-enactments of real life Spanish assassinations.
- La huella del crimen 3 (TVE, 2009) 3 episodes of 60/70 minutes. Sequel of the latter. Re-enactments of real life Spanish assassinations.

== I ==
- I ara que, Xènia (TV3, 1993) 10 episodes of 45 minutes. Xènia es en executive who wants to be a show star. (in Catalan)
- iFamily (La 1, 2017) Comedy
- Impares (Antena 3/Antena Neox, 2008–2010) 71 episodes. Comedy about a relationship agency on Internet.
- Imperium (Antena 3, 2012) Historical series starring Roman consul Servius Sulpicius Galba.
- Infidels (TV3 2009–2011) 42 episodes of 60 minutes. Drama about a group of women. Catalan.
- El incidente (Antena 3, 2017) After a storm, some strange things happen in a village
- El inocente (Netflix, 2021). 8 episodes. Thriller.
- Inocentes (Telecinco, 2010) Miniseries of 2 episodes. Three teenage girls are abducted.
- El inquilino (Antena 3, 2004) 13 episodes of 55 minutes. Comedy about an extraterrestrial left on Earth by mistake.
- Inquilinos (Canal Nou, 1996–1997) 52 episodes of 30 minutes. Comedy about a house where live an aristocrat, a ghost and a group of young people.
- Instinto (Movistar+, 2019), 8-episode erotic thriller television series.
- El internado (Antena 3, 2007–2010) 71 episodes of 75 minutes. Mystery series set in a boarding school.
- El internado: Las Cumbres (Amazon Prime Video, 2021–) 8 episodes. Mystery and teen drama series.
- La ira (Telecinco, 2009) Miniseries of 2 episodes of 90 minutes. Horror series about a young woman and a murderer.
- Isabel (La 1, 2012 – 2014) Series based upon the reign of Queen Isabella I of Castile.
- La isla de los nominados (Cuatro, 2010) Gag series about of a group of celebrities trapped in a Survivor-like TV show.

== J ==
- Jacinto Durante, representante (TVE, 2000) 13 episodes of 50 minutes. Comedy about a talent agent.
- Jaguar (Netflix, 2021) 6 episodes. Drama about Nazi-hunting set in Francoist Spain.
- El jardín de Venus (TVE, 1983–1984) 13 episodes of 45 minutes. Adaptations of Spanish erotic literature.
- Jaun ta jabe (ETB, 1997–?) episodes of 30 minutes. A basque cooker becomes lehendakari. (in Basque)
- Javier ya no vive solo (Telecinco, 2001–2003) 26 episodes of 40 minutes. A bachelor in his forties has to live with his nieces.
- Jelly Jamm (Clan TVE, 2011–2014) Animated preschool series.
- Jet lag (TV3, 2001–2006) 81 episodes of 25 minutes. Comedy about some women who work as flight attendants.
- Los jinetes del alba (TVE, 1990) 5 episodes of 50 minutes. Love story set on the Asturian miners' strike of 1934.
- El joven Picasso (FORTA, 1993) 4 episodes of 55 minutes. Biopic of Pablo Picasso.
- El joc de viure (TV3, 1996–1997) 140 episodes of 30 minutes. A 23-year-old student receives an unexpected inheritance. (in Catalan)
- Juan y Manuela (TVE, 1974) 13 episodes of 30 minutes. Manuela, is a runaway bride who meets Juan.
- Juanita, la larga (TVE, 1982) 3 episodes of 60 minutes. Adaptation of a novel by Juan Valera.
- Judes Xanguet i les maniquins (TV3, 1988–1989) 26 episodes of 30 minutes. Surreal comedy about a group of girls who want to become artists. (in Catalan)
- El juglar y la reina (TVE, 1978) 13 episodes of 30 minutes. Stories and legends of Spanish medieval poetry.
- Juncal (TVE, 1989) 7 episodes of 60 minutes. Series about a retired bullfighter to whom his wife throws of her house for being unfaithful.
- Juntas, pero no revueltas (TVE, 1989) 26 episodes of 50 minutes. Spanish adaptation of The Golden Girls.

== K ==
- Karabudjan (Antena 3, 2010) 6 episodes. A young publicist has a dark secret.
- Ke no! (Cuatro, 2005) 7 episodes of 25 minutes. Series about a group of young people.
- Ketty no para (TVE, 1998) 7 episodes of 25 minutes. Surreal comedy.
- Killer dema (ETB, 2002–2004) 26 episodes of 30 minutes. Comedy about a millionaire who makes some people of different social class live together so he can choose who will inherit him.
- Kiu i els seus amics (TV3, 1985–1986) 17 episodes of 30 minutes. Comedy about a group of children who discover an alien. (in Catalan)

== L ==
- La que se avecina (Telecinco 2007–present) 75 minutes. Comedy. Spiritual sequel of Aquí no hay quien viva.
- Laberint d’ombres (TV3, 1998–2000) 469 episodes of 30 minutes. Soap opera. (in Catalan)
- Laberint de passions (IB3, 2006–2008) 321 episodes of 35 minutes. Telenovela. (in Catalan)
- Los ladrones van a la oficina (Antena 3, 1993–1996) 124 episodes of 30/90 minutes. Comedy about a group of con-men who meet in a bar.
- Lalola (Antena 3, 2008–2009) 160 episodes of 40 minutes. Soap opera about a womanizer that becomes a woman due to a spell.
- Laura (TV3, 1991) Miniseries of 4 episodes of 100 minutes. A photographer suspects that her husband has been murdered.
- Lazkao Txiki (ETB, 2009–¿?) Episodes of 10 minutes. Animation about the life of bertsolari Lazkao Txiki.
- Lecciones de tocador (TVE, 1982) 12 episodes of 30 minutes. An aristocrat who had been dominated by his mother after her death decide to hire Juan to teach him how to seduce women.
- LEX (Antena 3, 2008) 16 episodes of 50 minutes. Series set in a law firm.
- La ley de la vida (Antena 3, 2008) 15 episodes of 50 minutes. Series about a group of lawyers.
- Libertad (Movistar+, 2021) 5 episodes. Historical drama about brigands
- Libro de familia (TVG, 2005–2013) 319 episodes of 70 minutes. Series about three families of different social classes. (in Galician)
- Los libros (La 2, 1974–1977) 52 episodes of 60 minutes. Adaptations of stories of Spanish literature.
- La línea invisible (Movistar+, 2020–present) Series about the early years of Basque separatist organization ETA.
- Llàgrima de sang (IB3, 2008–2011) 45 minutes. Family saga with wine theme background. Catalan
- La llamada de los gnomos (TVE, 1987–1988) 26 episodes of 25 minutes. Animation. Spin-off of The World of David the Gnome.
- Lleno, por favor (Antena 3, 1993–1994) 13 episodes of 50 minutes. Comedy about a reactionary who works at a gas station.
- Lobos (Antena 3, 2005) 9 episodes of 75 minutes. Manuel Lobo is a lawyer who is faced with the situation of having to walk around the edge of the law to keep your little girl ends up in jail for drug trafficking.
- El loco del desierto (TVE, 1986) Miniseries of 4 episodes of 55 minutes. In 1950 an oil magnate is found dead in a pension
- Lola (Antena 3, 2009) Miniseries of 2 episodes of 90 minutes. Biopic of Lola Flores.
- Lola y Virginia (TVE, 2006–2007) 52 episodes of 30 minutes. Animation. Lola is a normal girl whose life is below average. But as if that weren't enough, along comes Virginia Toffen, a stuck-up, bratty, typical rich girl who gets her way all the time.
- Lo que escondían sus ojos (Telecinco, 2016) Miniseries about the adultery of Francoist politician Ramón Serrano Suñer.
- London Street (Antena 3, 2003) 13 episodes of 30 minutes. Very unsuccessful comedy about a Spanish student who goes to London to learn English.
- Lorca, muerte de un poeta (TVE, 1987) 6 episodes of 40 minutes. Series on the execution of García Lorca.
- Luci (TVG, 2014–2015) Comedy starring a woman in her late thirties. (in Galician)
- Lucky Fred (Disney Channel, 2011–present) episodes of 12 minutes. Animation. A 13-year-old boy befriends a shapeshifter robot.
- Un lugar en el mundo (Antena 3, 2003) 13 episodes of 50 minutes. Julio is a neurologist who, after the death of his son, decides to leave everything to settle in a small town and open a rural hotel.
- #Luimelia (Movistar+, 2020) Romance television series.
- Luna, el misterio de Calenda (Antena 3, 2012 – 2013) A woman judge moves to a small village and becomes involved in a case of werewolves.
- Luna negra (TVE, 2003–2004) 194 episodes of 50 minutes. Soap opera.
- El Lute (TVE, 1987) Miniseries of 5 episodes of 60 minutes. Biopic of El Lute that was first released in two films (El Lute: camina o revienta and El Lute II: mañana seré libre)

== M ==
- Maité (ETB, 1998) 13 episodes of 60 minutes. Comedy about a Basque businessman who marries a Cuban girl.
- Majoria absoluta (TV3, 2002–2004) 64 episodes of 50 minutes. Comedy about a large family of Barcelona. (in Catalan)
- Makinavaja (La 2, 1995 & 1997) 26 episodes of 30 minutes. Comedy about a criminal based on a comic strip of the same name.
- Mamá quiere ser artista (Antena 3, 1997) 9 episodes of 53 minutes. A frustrated artist wants to turn his daughter in showbiz star.
- Maneras de sobrevivir (Telecinco, 2005) 13 episodes of 50 minutes. Comedy about a group of thirtysomethings.
- Los maniáticos (TVE, 1974) 13 episodes of 50 minutes. Daily life of a quirky family, consisting of Don Juan, the father, a widower that has his peace disturbed with the arrival of their daughter Lola, his son Paul and his grandchildren.
- Maniàtics (Canal Nou, 2007–2008) 52 episodes of 50 minutes. Comedy about eight characters with many quirks. (in Valencian)
- Manolo y Benito Corporeision (Antena 3, 2006 – 2007) 12 episodes of 70 minutes. Sequel of Manos a la obra.
- Manos a la obra (Antena 3, 1998 – 2001) 130 episodes of 60 minutes. Comedy about a pair of very sloppy blue-collar workers.
- Mañana puede ser verdad (TVE, 1964–1965) 6 episodes of 50 minutes. Unrelated plots of fantasy and science-fiction.
- Mar de dudas (TVE, 1995) 13 episodes of 45 minutes. Series that included a debate where audience chose the final.
- Mar de fons (TV3, 2006–2007) 40 episodes of 35 minutes. Soap opera about two families of Barcelona faced by a publisher. (in Catalan)
- Mar de plástico (Antena 3, 2015 – 2016) Police series about a murder in a village of Almería.
- El mar y el tiempo (TVE, 1987–1988) Miniseries 5 episodes of 40 minutes. A Spaniard exiled in Argentina returns to Spain in the spring of 1968 to reunite with his family. However, things have changed.
- Marcelino, pan y vino (TVE, 2000–2001) 26 episodes of 25 minutes. Animation. A child is raised in a convent.
- Marco (Antena 3, 2011–2012) Miniseries of 2 episodes. Live action version of the anime 3000 Leagues in Search of Mother.
- Mareas vivas (TVG, 1998–2003) 107 episodes of 60 minutes. Reality of a Galician fishing village located on Costa da Morte.
- La Mari (Canal Sur/TV3, 2003) Miniseries 2 episodes of 60 minutes. In the 1970s an Andalusian emigrates to Catalonia.
- La Mari 2 (Canal Sur/TV3, 2009) Miniseries of 2 episodes of 60 minutes. Sequel of La Mari.
- Maricón perdido (TNT, 2021) Miniseries of 6 episodes. Autofiction/comedy-drama
- Maridos e mulleres (TVG, 2006) 26 episodes of 60 minutes. Lives of four families in a residential community. Galician.
- Mario Conde. Los días de gloria (Telecinco, 2013) Miniseries of 2 episodes. Biopic of Spanish banker Mario Conde.
- Marisol (Antena 3, 2009) Miniseries of 2 episodes of 75 minutes. Biopic of the catres Marisol.
- El marqués de Sotoancho (Antena 3, 2009) Miniseries of 2 episodes of 60 minutes. A Marquis in his forties who lives with her mother has to marry to keep his farm.
- Martín (ETB, 2003–¿?) Episodes of 75 minutes. Comedy about a sportscaster and his family.
- ¡Más que amigos! (Telecinco, 1997–1998) 29 episodes of 60 minutes. Comedy about a group of thirtysomethings who share a flat.
- La máscara negra (TVE, 1982) 11 episodes of 50 minutes. A noble struggle against Joseph Bonaparte and the French.
- Matadero (Antena 3, 2019) Black comedy
- Matalobos (TVG, 2009–2013) Episodes 50 minutes. About a Galician family of drug-dealers. (in Galician)
- Matrimonis y patrimonis (Canal Nou, 2005) 13 episodes of 60 minutes. A man mysteriously disappears.
- Matrimonio con hijos (Cuatro, 2006–2007) Comedy. Spanish adaptation of Married... with Children.
- El mayorazgo de Labraz (TVE, 1983) Miniseries of 4 episodes of 60 minutes. Adaptation of a novel by Pío Baroja.
- Me alquilo para soñar (TVE, 1992) Miniseries of 6 episodes of 55 minutes. Adapted from a story by Gabriel García Márquez.
- Mecanoscrit del segon origen (TV3, 1985–1986) (TV3, 1985–1986) 7 episodes of 30 minutes. Adapted from a novel by Manuel de Pedrolo. Young Alba and Didac, become virtually the only survivors of the Earth after aliens removed almost all of humanity. (in Catalan)
- Media naranja (TVE, 1986) 23 episodes of 54 minutes. 23 episodes of 54 minutes. Comedy about the coexistence of Julia, a young enterprising, lively and energetic and Luis, a shy and timid.
- Médico de familia (Telecinco, 1995–1999) 119 episodes of 60/70 minutes. Tribulations of a young doctor, a widower with three children and a teenage nephew in charge, who must rebuild his family life.
- Mediterráneo (Telecinco, 1999–2000) 26 episodes of 50 minutes. Ricardo, a man uninterested in animals, is appointed director of a natural park in which he is attracted to the veterinarian Clara.
- La memòria dels Cargols (TV3, 1999–2000) 26 episodes of 45 minutes. Comedy about the Catalan family the Cargolls over 700 years, from the Black Death to the present. (in Catalan)
- Menos lobos (TVE, 1992) 13 episodes of 25 minutes. Comedy about three professionals who are roommates.
- Mentiras (Atresplayer Premium, 2020) 6 episodes of 50 minutes. Mystery thriller about an alleged rape
- Menudo es mi padre (Antena 3, 1996 – 1997) 60 episodes of 70 minutes. Comedy about a taxi driver and his family.
- Mercado Central (La 1, 2019–2021) 310 Episodes. Soap opera set in a market.
- Merlí (TV3, 2015–present) About an institute philosophy teacher. (in Catalan)
- Mesa para cinco (La Sexta, 2006) 22 episodes of 30 minutes. Five brothers lost their parents in an accident and have to live on their own.
- Metamorfosis (TVE, 1987) Miniseries 2 episodes of 90 minutes. Based on a novel by Stefan Zweig and set in Germany in the 1920s.
- Mi gemela es hija única (Telecinco, 2008–2009) 54 episodes of 40 minutes. Twins sisters separated at birth meet as adults and choose to change their lives.
- Mi gitana (Telecinco, 2012) Miniseries of 3 episodes. Biopic of Isabel Pantoja.
- Mi hijo y yo (TVE, 1962–1963) 26 episodes of 25 minutes. Difficult coexistence between a mother and her son, burdened by the clash of generations.
- Mi querido Klikowsky (ETB, 2005–present) Episodes of 60 minutes. A London falls for a Basque woman and goes to live Eibar.
- Mi teniente (TVE, 2001) 5 episodes of 60 minutes. Series about the Spanish Civil Guard.
- Miguel Hernández. Viento del pueblo (TVE, 2001) Miniseries of 2 episodes of 90 minutes. Biopic of Miguel Hernández.
- Miguel Servet, la sangre y la ceniza (TVE, 1988) Miniseries of 7 episodes of 60 minutes. Biopic of Miguel Servet.
- Las mil y una...Américas (TVE, 1989–1991) 26 episodes of 23 minutes. A young boy reads a book about different nations that lived in America before it was discovered by Columbus and imagines being there.
- Los mini Fruitis (TVE, 1992) 26 episodes of 11 minutes. Animation. Adventures of anthropomorphic fruits.
- El ministerio del tiempo (La 1, 2015 – present) A soldier of the sixteenth century, a woman of the nineteenth century and a male nurse from 2015 are hired by a ministry to travel through time.
- Mino, el pequeño soldado (TVE, 1986) Miniseries of 6 episodes of 60 minutes. A boy searches for his father during the World War I.
- MIR (Telecinco, 2007–2008) 26 episodes of 75 minutes. Series about doctors.
- Mira lo que has hecho (Movistar+, 2018–2020) 3 seasons and 18 episodes. Comedy
- Mirall trencat (TV3, 2002) Miniseries of13 episodes of 50 minutes. Life of a Catalan gentry family from the late nineteenth century to the Spanish Civil War. (in Catalan)
- Mis adorables vecinos (Antena 3, 2004–2006) 62 episodes of 90 minutes. Comedy about a working-class family who, after their daughter becomes a child star, move to live in a high-class district.
- Miscelánea (Canal Sur, 2008) 13 episodes of 10 minutes. Animation. Series to teach healthy habits to teens.
- Los misterios de Laura (TVE, 2009–2014) Episodes of 80 minutes. Detective series about a mother and police.
- Los mitos (TVE, 1979) 13 episodes of 50 minutes. Independent episodes that shows a revision of various myths.
- Mocland (TVE, 1979) 26 episodes of 25 minutes. Animation. A planet is without energy because of an evil general.
- Mofli, el último koala (TVE, 1986) 13 episodes of 30 minutes. Animation. In the 21st century there is only one koala alive.
- El món màgic del màgic Bruffi (TV3, 1985) 26 episodes of 25 minutes. Puppets. Catalan Folktales. (in Catalan)
- Moncloa ¿dígame? (Telecinco, 2001) 13 episodes of 20 minutes. Comedy about the office of the press department of the Moncloa.
- Monetes del espacio: (Cartoon Network, 2012) Episodes of 2 minutes. Animation. Two alien monkeys are investigating Earthlings customs.
- Los Moreres (Canal Nou, 2007–2008) 100 episodes of 25 minutes. Soap opera. (in Valencian)
- Mortadelo y Filemón (Antena 3, 1994–1995) 27 episodes of 30 minutes. Animation based on the comic of the same name. There are some short subjects of the same title of the 1960s–1970s.
- Motivos personales (Telecinco, 2005) 27 episodes of 80 minutes. Mystery drama.
- Una mujer de su casa (TVE, 1972) 13 episodes of 30 minutes. Comedy about housewives.
- La mujer de tu vida (TVE, 1990) 7 episodes of 60 minutes. Independent episodes about various types of women.
- La mujer de tu vida 2 (TVE, 1990) 6 episodes of 60 minutes. Sequel of the latter.
- Mujeres (La 2, 2006) 13 episodes of 60 minutes. Tragicomedy about some women from a district of Madrid.
- Mujeres insólitas (TVE, 1977) 13 episodes of 60 minutes. Series about historical women.
- Mujeres solas (TVE, 1961) 15 episodes of 15 minutes. Comedy about four girls staying in a residence.
- El mundo de Chema (Cuatro, 2006) 11 episodes of 30 minutes. Gag series about a man posing as woman to live with a woman he loves.
- El mundo de Juan Lobón (TVE, 1989) Miniseries of 5 episodes of 60 minutes. Atavistic fight for control of land between Juan Lobón, a poacher, and the owners of the plots in rural Andalusia in the Spanish Civil War.
- Museo Coconut (Neox, 2010–2014) Episodes of 25 minutes. Surreal comedy set in a museum.

== N ==
- Nada es para siempre (Antena 3, 1999–2000) 375 episodes of 30 minutes Youth soap opera.
- Nasdrovia (Movistar+, 2020–) 6 episodes of 30 minutes. Comedy thriller series.
- Néboa (La 1, 2020) 8 episodes. Mystery thriller set in Galicia.
- Los negocios de mamá (TVE, 1997) 13 episodes of 55 minutes. A mature woman should push through their clothing store and care for your family.
- Negocis de familia (Canal Nou, 2005–2007) 250 episodes of 30 minutes. A married couple inherits a hotel from his uncle, but an unexpected third heir appears. (in Valencian)
- Ni contigo ni sin ti (TVE, 1998) 13 episodes of 50 minutes. Comedy about a former marriage whose members have long been divorced, but continue to see each other.
- Nico (TVE, 2001) Animated series about a blind child.
- Ninette y un señor de Murcia (TVE, 1984) Miniseries of 8 episodes of 40 minutes. Miniseries of 8 episodes of 40 minutes. Based on a play by Miguel Mihura.
- Niños robados (Telecinco, 2013) Miniseries of 2 episodes about child theft in the Francoist regime.
- Nissaga de poder (TV3, 1996–1998) 476 episodes of 30 minutes. Soap opera about two rich incestuous siblings owners of cellars. (in Catalan)
- Nissaga: l'herència (TV3, 1999–2000) 26 episodes of 30 minutes. Sequel of Nissaga de poder. (in Catalan)
- El nudo (Atresplayer Premium, 2019–2020) 13 episodes of 50 minutes. Thriller drama.
- Los nuestros (Telecinco, 2015) Miniseries of 3 episodes of 75 minutes. A group of military personnel is sent to a rescue mission in Mali.
- Una nueva vida (Telecinco, 2003) 3 episodes of 70 minutes. Medical drama.
- Nunca es tarde (TVE, 1984) Miniseries 4 episodes of 50 minutes. Tragicomedy about the theme of love.
- Nunca se sabe (TVE, 1984) Miniseries 4 episodes of 50 minutes. Drama.

== O ==
- El obispo leproso (TVE, 1990) Miniseries of 6 episodes of 60 minutes. Based on two novels by Gabriel Miró.
- Obsesión (TVE, 2005) 125 episodes of 50 minutes. Soap opera.
- Oh! Espanya (TV3, 1996) 17 episodes of 30 minutes. A group of Catalan tourists made surrealist travels across different communities of Spain. Sequel of Oh! Europa. (in Catalan)
- Oh! Europa (TV3, 1996) 13 episodes of 30 minutes. A group of Catalan tourists made surrealist travels across different countries of the European Economic Community. (in Catalan)
- Oliana Molls i l'astàleg de bronze (TV3, 1985–1987) 61 episodes of 30 minutes. Adventures of a Catalan archaeologist. (in Catalan)
- El olivar de Atocha (TVE, 1988) 26 episodes of 60 minutes. Family saga from 1898 to 1988.
- Olmos y Robles (La 1, 2015 – 2016) Comedy about two civil guards.
- O Nordés (TVG, 2009–2010) 13 episodes of 60 minutes. Series about the employees of a small newspaper in Vigo. (in Galician)
- Original (TVE, 1974–1977) 48 episodes of 60 minutes. Drama unfolding at different times in the history of Spain.
- Os Atlánticos (TVG, 2008–2009) 26 episodes. Series about a five-member village orchest. (in Galician)
- Operación Malaya (TVE, 2011) Miniseries of 2 episodes. Series about the corruption case Operation Malaya.
- Operación Jaque (TVE, 2011) Miniseries of 2 episodes. About the hostage liberation of Colombian politician Íngrid Betancourt.
- Oro verde (Antena 3, 1992) 65 episodes of 60 minutes. History of a rich olive producer of Jaén.
- Otoño romántico (TVE, 1973–1974) 13 episodes of 50 minutes. Romantic drama.
- La otra cara del espejo (TVE, 1965) 8 episodes of 50 minutes. Drama
- La otra mirada (La 1, 2018–present) Series set in a girl academy in the 1920s

== P ==
- Pablo y Virginia (TVE, 1968) 13 episodes of 30 minutes. Comedy about a married couple.
- Paco y Veva (TVE, 2004) 18 episodes of 60 minutes. Musical comedy.
- El pacto (Telecinco, 2010) Miniseries of 2 episodes. Seven teenage girls make a pact to become pregnant at the same time.
- Padre Casares (TVG, 2008–2015) Episodes of 60 minutes. A priest is assigned to a village on the coast of Galicia. (in Galician)
- Padre Coraje (Antena 3, 2002) Miniseries of 3 episodes of 100 minutes. Based on true events, a father investigates the murder of his son.
- El padre de Caín (Telecinco, 2016) Miniseries of de 2 episodes. Romantic story with ETA terrorism in the background.
- Padres (Antena 3, 2009 – 2010) 40 episodes of 22 minutes. Sketches about a group of parents.
- Pagats per riure (TV3, 2001) 6 episodes of 30 minutes. 6 episodes of 30 minutes. Independent episodes with analysis of human behavior. (in Catalan)
- Página de sucesos (TVE, 1985) 13 episodes of 60 minutes. Two journalists working in Madrid.
- Páginas sueltas (TVE, 1970–1971) 13 episodes de 30 minutes. Drama.
- Pájaro en una tormenta (TVE, 1989) Miniseries 10 episodes of 60 minutes. In 1977, two policemen have to solve a murder.
- Los paladines (TVE, 1971) Miniseries of 7 episodes of 50 minutes. In the Reconquista a Christian gentleman, a farmer and a noble Muslim make a pact.
- Palma y Don Jaime (TVE, 1959–1960) 41 episodes of 30 minutes. Comedy about a jovial secretary and her strict boss.
- El pantano (Antena 3, 2003) 9 episodes of 70 minutes. Mystery.
- Papá (Antena 3, 2001) 5 episodes of 60 minutes. Very unsuccessful comedy about a man who has just become father.
- Paquirri (Telecinco, 2009) Miniseries of 2 episodes of 90 minutes. Biopic of Paquirri.
- Para Elisa (TVE, 1993) 16 episodes of 60 minutes. Tragicomedy about 3 friends who start an advertising agency.
- Para qué sirve un marido (La 2, 1997) 13 episodes of 30 minutes. Comedy about a woman of 40 who moves to Barcelona.
- Paraíso (TVE, 2000–2003) 42 episodes of 60 minutes. Series set in a luxury hotel.
- Una pareja cualquiera (TVE, 1961–1962) 20 episodes of 15 minutes. Sequel of Galería de esposas.
- Parejología 3x2 (Telecinco, 2011), later renamed Cuñados (Telecinco, 2012) Comedy about 3 marriages.
- El pasado es mañana (Telecinco, 2005) 130 episodes of 30 minutes. Soap opera about the fashion industry.
- Pase sin llamar (La 1, 1988 – 1991) Sitcom about a family with 3 children. Included in the child program Cajón desastre.
- Un paso adelante (Antena 3, 2002 – 2005) 84 episodes of 80 minutes. Series about a group of students of a dance academy.
- Pazo de familia (TVG, 2014–present) Sequel of Libro de familia. (in Galician)
- Los pazos de Ulloa (TVE, 1985) Miniseries of 4 episodes of 60 minutes. Based on a novel by Emilia Pardo Bazán.
- La pecera de Eva (Telecinco/La7, 2010–2011) Drama about a psychologist in an institute.
- Pedralbes Centre (TV3, 1994) 13 episodes of 40 minutes. Sitcom set in a mall. (in Catalan)
- Pedro I "El Cruel" (TVE, 1989) Miniseries of 12 episodes of 60 minutes. Series that presented sympathetically the life of Peter I of Castile.
- Películas para no dormir (Telecinco, 2007) 6 episodes of 75/90 minutes. Independent episodes of terror.
- Pelotas (TVE, 2009–2010) 24 episodes of 100 minutes. Comedy about a group of friends who meet on Sunday morning to see the modest football team of their neighborhood.
- La peluquería (TVE, 2017) Sketch comedy set in a hair salon.
- Pepa y Pepe (TVE, 1995) 34 episodes of 30 minutes. Comedy about a marriage with a bar.
- Pepe Carvalho (TVE, 1995) 6 episodes of 90 minutes. Detective series.
- Pepe o inglés (TVG, 2006–2007) Comedy about the owner of a workshop. (in Galician)
- Pequeno hotel (TVG, 2001) 13 episodes of 25 minutes. Comedy set in a hotel in Vigo. (in Galician)
- La pequeña comedia (TVE, 1966–1968) 26 episodes of 30 minutes. Independent comedy episodes.
- Pequeñas coincidencias (Amazon Prime Video, 2018–2021). 30 episodes. Romantic comedy.
- El pequeño capitán (TVE, 1982) 26 episodes of 30 minutes. Animation. Series about the discovery of America.
- Perdóname, Señor (Telecinco, 2017) A nun gets involved in an illegal drug trade case.
- Periodistas (Telecinco, 1998–2002) 107 episodes of 60 minutes. Adventures of journalists from a newspaper.
- El personaje y su mundo (TVE, 1961) 16 episodes of 15 minutes. Sequel of Álvaro y su mundo.
- La peste (#0, 2018–present) In the 16th century the Inquisition request a soldier to investigate some mysterious murders.
- Petra Delicado (Telecinco/Vía Digital, 1999) 13 episodes of 50 minutes. Detective series.
- Las pícaras (TVE, 1983) Miniseries of 6 episodes of 55 minutes. Adaptations of Spanish picaresque novels.
- El pícaro (TVE, 1974) Miniseries of 13 episodes of 25 minutes. In the seventeenth century a rogue tries to live working as little as possible.
- Piccola Roma (TVE, 1988) Miniseries of 7 episodes of 60 minutes. A barber in a neighborhood of Rome falls for a woman with a child.
- La piel azul (Antena 3, 2010) Miniseries of 2 episodes. Some young people see how what it was expected to be a dream trip by boat gets complicated.
- Pili, secretaria ideal (TVE, 1975) 13 episodes of 20 minutes. Comedy about the anxieties of a near-perfect secretary, Pili, to address the demands of her grouchy boss.
- Piratas (Telecinco, 2011) 8 episodes of 90 minutes. Historical adventures series about a group of pirates.
- Pirrataz (TNT, 2011–?) Puppet animation. Comedy about a band of punk rats.
- Plan América (TVE/La 2, 2008) 6 episodes of 90 minutes. A Spanish aide of NGOs become involved in a conflict between Latin American guerrillas.
- Planta 25 (FORTA, 2006–2007) 75 episodes of 30 minutes. Black comedy about a construction company.
- Platea (TVE, 1963) 6 episodes of 50 minutes. Independent drama episodes.
- Platos rotos (TVE, 1985–1986) 13 episodes of 30 minutes. A middle-aged woman must face a new stage in her life after being abandoned by her husband.
- Plats bruts (TV3, 1999–2002) 73 episodes of 25 minutes. Comedy about some friends who share a flat. (in Catalan)
- Plaza alta (Canal Sur, 1998–2001) 435 episodes of 25 minutes. Confrontation of two families of wine world.
- La plaza del Diamante (TVE, 1982) Miniseries of 4 episodes of 60 minutes. Adaptation of a novel by Mercè Rodoreda.
- Plaza de España (TVE, 2011) Comedy set during the Spanish Civil War.
- Plinio (TVE, 1971–1972) 13 episodes of 60 minutes. Detective series set in the village of Tomelloso.
- Plutón BRB Nero (La 2, 2008 – 2009) 26 episodes of 30 minutes. Science fiction comedy series.
- Poblenou (TV3, 1994) 192 episodes of 30 minutes. Soap opera about the daily life of the inhabitants of Poblenou, a district of Barcelona. (in Catalan)
- Pocoyo (TVE, 2005–2010) Episodes of 7 minutes. Pre-school animated television series.
- Policías, en el corazón de la calle (Antena 3, 2000–2003) 83 episodes of 60 minutes. Police drama.
- Polseres vermelles (TV3, 2011–2013) Episodes of 43 minutes. Everyday story of a group of teenagers who meet at a hospital because of their illness. (in Catalan)
- Ponme una nube, Rocío (Canal Sur, 2008–2009) 13 episodes of 60 minutes. Comedy about two women who fight over the inheritance of a bar.
- Pop ràpid (Canal 33, 2011) Comedy about some guys with a band. (in Catalan)
- Por fin solos (Antena 3, 1995) 14 episodes of 60 minutes. Comedy about a married couple with four grown children who, despite not living in the house, are a source of problems.
- Por H o por B (HBO España, 2020) 10 episodes. Comedy.
- Porca Misèria (TV3, 2004–2007) 52 episodes of 50 minutes. Coral tragicomedy about the miseries of everyday life. (in Catalan)
- El porvenir es largo (TVE, 2009) 66 episodes of 50 minutes. Series about the problems of people who have survived the collapse of their house.
- Power Wonders (TNT, 2011–?) Comedy about a family of superheroes.
- Pratos combinados (TVG, 1995–2006) 261 episodes of 30/55 minutes. Comedy about a family who owns a bar. (in Galician)
- El premio (TVE, 1968–1969) 13 episodes of 50 minutes. Adaptations of works by Nobel laureates.
- Presunto culpable (Antena 3, 2018–present) Thriller.
- Prêt-à-porter (TVE, 1994) 13 episodes of 30 minutes. Comedy set in a tailor shop.
- La princesa de Éboli (Antena 3, 2010) Miniseries of 2 episodes. Life of Ana de Mendoza, Princess of Eboli.
- El Príncipe (Telecinco, 2014–2016) Police series set in a conflictive zone of Ceuta.
- Proceso a Mariana Pineda (TVE, 1984) Miniseries of 5 episodes of 60 minutes. Series about the nineteenth-century heroine Mariana Pineda.
- Profesor en La Habana (FORTA, 2006) 13 episodes of 60 minutes. Comedy about a Spanish professor who inherits a nightclub in Havana.
- La Promesa (La 1, 2021) 741 episodes. Period drama and soap opera.
- Promesas de arena (La 1, 2019) 6 episodes. Adventure and romance miniseries.
- Los protegidos (Antena 3, 2010–2012) Episodes of 75 minutes. A group of people with supernatural powers pose as a family, in order to escape an organization that are after them.
- Los protegidos: El regreso (Atresplayer Premium, 2021) 4 episodes. Sequel to Los protegidos.
- El pueblo (Prime Video, 2019–). Rural comedy.
- Psicodriving (Nitro/La Sexta, 2012) Comedy about a psychologist who works in a car.
- Psico Express (TV3, 2001–2002) 26 episodes of 25 minutes. Comedy about some psychologists who treat their patients via videoconference. (in Catalan)
- Punta Escarlata (Telecinco, 2011) Episodes of 90 minutes. Two cops try to solve a murder in a seaside town.
- Puerta con puerta (TVE, 1999) 13 episodes of 50 minutes. Comedy about a spoiled aristocrat who has to live next to a "new rich".
- Pulsaciones (Antena 3, 2017) A doctor investigates the murder of a journalist whose heart has been transplanted to him.
- La punyalada (TV3, 1991) Miniseries of 3 episodes of 60 minutes. Adapted from a novel by Marià Vayreda.

== Q ==
- Quart (Antena 3/Antena Neox, 2007) 6 episodes of 90 minutes. Adventures of a detective priest.
- Quart Segona (TV3, 1991) 13 episodes of 30 minutes. Comedy about a woman who sublet her apartment. (in Catalan)
- ¡Qué bello es sobrevivir! (Telecinco, 2001) episodes of 25 minutes. Animation. Comedy about a family.
- ¿Qué fue de Jorge Sanz? (Canal +, 2010) Miniseries of 6 episodes of 30 minutes. Comedy about a fictional version of actor Jorge Sanz.
- ¡Qué loca peluquería! (Antena 3, 1994 – 1995) 26 episodes of 30 minutes. Comedy set in a barbershop.
- ¡Que usted lo mate bien (TVE, 1979) 13 episodes of 30 minutes. Black comedy about a businessman who discovers that his wife is unfaithful.
- Qué vida más triste (La Sexta, 2008–2010) 178 episodes. Comedy in which a young man of Basauri tells his misadventures.
- Querido maestro (Telecinco, 1997–1998) 40 episodes of 60 minutes. Series about the teachers of a village.
- Qui? (TV3, 1990) 13 episodes of 60 minutes. Police series that requested the opinion of the audience. (in Catalan)
- Quico l’ex-progre (TV3, 1992–1993) 13 episodes of 60 minutes. Comedy based on a comic about a fortysomething with two children who works in advertising. (in Catalan)
- Los Quién (Antena 3, 2011) Comedy set in the 1980s.
- ¿Quién da la vez? (Antena 3, 1995) 13 episodes of 50 minutes. Series about a female fish vendor of a district.
- El Quijote de Miguel de Cervantes (TVE, 1991) Miniseries of 5 episodes of 60/65 minutes. Adaptation of the novel Don Quixote.
- El quinto jinete (TVE, 1975–1976) 13 episodes of 60 minutes. Separate stories of terror and mystery.
- Quítate tú, pá ponerme yo (Telecinco, 1998) 13 episodes of 55 minutes. Comedy about two families who are forced to share a flat.

== R ==
- Rabia (Cuatro, 2015) A mysterious illness turns people into monsters.
- Ramón y Cajal: Historia de una voluntad (La 2, 1982) Miniseries of 10 episodes of 50 minutes. Life of Santiago Ramón y Cajal.
- Raphael: una historia de superación personal (Antena 3, 2010) Miniseries of 2 episodes. Based on the life of cancer of singer Raphael.
- Raquel busca su sitio (TVE, 2000–2001) 25 episodes of 60 minutes. Series about some social workers.
- Recordar, peligro de muerte (La 2, 1986) (La 2, 1986) 8 episodes of 60 minutes. A man receives a letter showing who murdered his father 40 years ago.
- Recuerda cuando (TVE, 1987) 9 episodes of 50 minutes. A couple in divorce proceedings recalls their 20-year relationship.
- The Refugees (La Sexta, 2015) 8 episodes of 50 minutes. 3,000 million people from the future have traveled to the present to escape from an imminent global disaster.
- La Regenta (TVE, 1987) Miniseries of 3 episodes of 100 minutes. Adapted from the novel Leopoldo Alas.
- Régimen abierto (TVE, 1986) 5 episodes of 60 minutes. An ex-convict finds that his wife has a relationship with his former partner.
- El regreso de Curro Jiménez (Antena 3, 1994). Sequel to Curro Jiménez.
- La reina del pueblo (Atresplayer Premium, 2021). 6 episodes. Comedy set in a village
- La reina del sur (Antena 3, 2010 – 2011) Soap opera.
- Reinas (La 1, 2017): Series about Elizabeth I of England and Mary, Queen of Scots
- Remite: Maribel (TVE, 1970) 15 episodes of 30 minutes. A young man must leave his people to engage in domestic service in the city.
- Réquiem por Granada (TVE, 1970) 8 episodes of 30 minutes. Boabdil, last king of the Kingdom of Granada, tells his life from his childhood to the defeat from the Catholic Monarchs.
- El Rey (Telecinco, 2014) Miniseries of 3 episodes. Biopic of Juan Carlos I.
- Rías Baixas (TVG, 2000–2005) 191 episodes of 60 minutes. Saga of family owners of vineyards. (in Galician)
- Riders (playz, 2021) 7 episodes of 20 minutes. Comedy thriller.
- RIS Científica (Telecinco, 2007) 13 episodes of 50 minutes. Detective series.
- La risa española (UHF, 1969) 13 episodes of 90 minutes. Independent comedy episodes.
- Robles, investigador privado (TVE, 2000) 13 episodes of 50 minutes. Personal and professional life of Detective Robles.
- Rocío, casi madre (TVE, 2000) 13 episodes of 50 minutes. Spin off of Arrayán.
- Romança (TV3, 1988–1989) Miniseries of 5 episodes of 55 minutes. Romance between a tenor and his childhood sweetheart. (in Catalan)
- La Rosa (TV3, 1995–1996) 29 episodes of 50 minutes. (in Catalan)
- Rosa, la lluita (TV3, 1996) 8 episodes of 50 minutes. Sequel of Rosa, punt i a part. (in Catalan)
- Rosa, punt I apart (TV3, 1996) Miniseries of 4 episodes of 50 minutes. Spin off of Poblenou. (in Catalan)
- Rosi y los demás (TVE, 1963–1964) 13 episodes of 25 minutes. Comedy about a young girl and her quirky friends.
- Rovelló (TV3, 2000–2002) 105 episodes of 25 minutes. Animation. Adventures of a dog on a farm. (in Catalan)
- Russafa 56 (Canal Nou, 1992) 13 episodes of 25 minutes. Comedy about a family. (in Catalan)
- Ruy, el pequeño Cid (TVE, 1980) 26 episodes of 30 minutes. Animation. Adventures of child El Cid.

== S ==
- Sabbath (TVE, 1990) 6 episodes of 90 minutes. Series of horror and witchcraft.
- Sabuesos (La 1, 2018–present) A wannabe detective meets a talking dog.
- La saga de los Clark (Canal +, 1997) 55 episodes of 2 minutes. Parody of soap operas.
- La saga de los Rius (TVE, 1976) Miniseries of 13 episodes of 60 minutes. Life of the Barcelona bourgeoisie of the early twentieth century, through the Rebull family.
- Sandino (TVE, 1990) Miniseries of 3 episodes of 55 minutes. Life of Augusto C. Sandino (1895–1934), leader of the Nicaraguan resistance.
- Sandokan (Telecinco, 1992) 26 episodes of 30 minutes. Adaptations of the Sandokan novels.
- Sandra, detective de cuentos (TVE, 2009–2010) 52 episodes of 13 minutes. Animation. Adventures of a little girl who is a detective on fairytales.
- ¿Se puede? (TVE, 2004) 13 episodes of 50 minutes. Gag series starring Lina Morgan.
- El secreto (TVE, 2001) 178 episodes of 50 minutes. Soap opera.
- El secreto de la porcelana (TVE, 1999) Miniseries of 2 episodes of 90 minutes. Carlos III requests the only Spaniard who knows how to make porcelain.
- El secreto de Puente Viejo (Antena 3, 2011 – present) Soap opera set in the 1900ss.
- Secretos de Estado (Telecinco, 2019–present) Political thriller
- Secrets de família (TV3, 1995–1996) 190 episodes of 25 minutes. A man is reunited with his family after 25 years. (in Catalan)
- Segunda enseñanza (TVE, 1986) 13 episodes of 60 minutes. Story of a high school female teacher.
- Seis hermanas (La 1, 2015 – present) Soap opera set in 1913.
- El Séneca (TVE, 1964–1970) episodes of 45 minutes. History of a peculiar character who can solve any problem with his good sense and good humor.
- El Séneca (Canal Sur, 1996) 26 episodes of 30 minutes. Continuation of the previous series.
- Señor alcalde (Telecinco, 1998) 21 episodes of 50 minutes. Comedy about the mayor of a village.
- El señor Villanueva y su gente (TVE, 1979) 13 episodes of 25 minutes. Comedy about a wealthy family.
- La Señora (TVE, 2008–2010) 39 episodes of 75 minutes. Soap opera set in the 1920s.
- Señoras del (h)AMPA (Telecinco, 2019–present) Black comedy.
- La señora García se confiesa (TVE, 1976–1977) 13 episodes of 30 minutes. A gentry woman falls for a television writer.
- Señoras que... (Neox, 2012–2013) Sketch comedy about four old and weird women.
- El séptimo cielo (TVE, 1989–1990) 12 episodes of 50 minutes. Independent stories starring Monica Randall.
- Serie negra (TVE, 1994) Miniseries of 3 episodes of 50 minutes. Three detective stories.
- Sé quién eres (Telecinco, 2017) An amnesiac lawyer is suspected of murder.
- Serie rosa (TVE, 1986–1990) 28 episodes of 50 minutes. Adaptations of erotic stories.
- Serrallonga. La leyenda del bandolero (TVE/TV3, 2008) Miniseries of 2 episodes of 75 minutes. Life of Catalan thug Joan Sala i Ferrer.
- Serramoura (TVG, 2014–present) Police series set in a Galician village. (in Galician)
- Los Serrano (Telecinco, 2003–2008) 147 episodes of 80 minutes. Comedy about a widowed man with three sons who marries a divorced woman with two daughters.
- Servir y proteger (La 1, 2017 – present) Police drama.
- Setze dobles (TV3, 2003) 26 episodes of 55 minutes. Tragicomedy set in a hotel. (in Catalan)
- Severo Ochoa. La conquista de un Nóbel (TVE, 2001) Miniseries od 2 episodes of 105 minutes. Life of Severo Ochoa.
- Sexo en Chueca (Telecinco/FactoríaDeFicción, 2009–2010) Comedy about of group of people who live in the district of Chueca, Madrid.
- El sexólogo (TVE/Antena 3, 1994) 13 episodes of 35 minutes. Comedy about the adventures of a sexologist.
- Skam España (Movistar+, 2018–2020) Teen drama adapting the Norwegian series Skam.
- Si fueras tú (rtve.es/playz, 2017) 8 episodes. Trans-media thriller streaming television series
- Si yo fuera rico (TVE, 1973–1974) 13 episodes of 50 minutes. Comedy about a man who imagines what life would be if he worked on something else (actor, bullfighter, etc.)
- Silencio, estrenamos (TVE, 1974) 16 episodes of 30 minutes. Series about a theater company.
- Silencio, se rueda (TVE, 1961–1962) 13 episodes of 25 minutes. Series about the world of cinema.
- Silencio, vivimos (TVE, 1962) 13 episodes of 25 minutes. Sequel of Silencio, se rueda.
- Los simuladores (Cuatro, 2006) 17 episodes of 50 minutes. Four partners are in the business of "simulation", solving the problems and needs of their customers under false pretenses.
- El síndrome de Ulises (Antena 3, 2007 – 2008) 26 episodes of 70 minutes. A doctor of high society has to move to a working-class neighborhood.
- Si no t'hagués conegut (TV3, 2018) A man sees different paths his life could hae taken (Catalan)
- Sin identidad (Antena 3, 2014 – 2015) Series about a stolen baby.
- Sin tetas no hay paraíso, (Telecinco, 2008–2009) 43 episodes of 75 minutes. A young woman falls for a drug trafficker.
- Singles (Canal Nou, 2008) 13 episodes of 50 minutes. A group of single friends are looking for a partner.
- Sitges (TV3, 1996–1997) 32 episodes of 55 minutes. Series set in Sitges. (in Catalan)
- SMS (Sin miedo a soñar) (La Sexta, 2006–2007) 182 episodes of 22 minutes. Youth soap opera.
- Sóc com sóc (TV3, 1990) 13 episodes of 30 minutes. Comedy about a man who inherits a department store. (in Catalan)
- Socarrats (Canal Nou, 2007–2009) episodes of 20 minutes. Sketches on summer and holiday themes. (in Catalan)
- Sofía (Antena 3, 2010) Miniseries of two episodes about Queen Sofía of Spain.
- Somos cómplices (Antena 3, 2009) 2 episodes of 45 minutes. A woman tries to scam a millionaire.
- La sonata del silencio (La 1, 2016) Series set in the 1940s
- Sonatas (TVE, 1982) Miniseries of 2 episodes of 60 minutes. Adaptations of novels by Ramón María del Valle-Inclán.
- La sopa boba (Antena 3, 2004) 100 episodes of 30 minutes. Comedy about a woman who, after a divorce, must take charge of a dilapidated hotel.
- Sospecha (TVE, 1963–1971) 49 episodes of 90 minutes. Independent episodes of mystery.
- Soy el Solitario (Antena 3, 2008) Miniseries of 2 episodes of 90 minutes. Life of bank robber Jaime Giménez Arbe.
- Stamos okupa2 (La 1, 2012) Comedy about a group of elderly people who decide squatting a building of a banker.
- Stop (TVE, 1972) Miniseries of 8 episodes of 30 minutes. Series of driver education.
- Suárez y Mariscal, caso cerrado (Cuatro, 2005) 75 episodes of 24 minutes. Detective series starring two cops in real life.
- Suite Hotel (IB3, 2006) 21 episodes of 45 minutes. Two partners, owners of a hotel, do not agree.
- Sumarísimo (TVE, 1978–1979) 13 episodes of 40 minutes. Absurd comedy in which famous people were put on trial.
- El súper (Telecinco, 1996–1999) 738 episodes of 25 minutes. Soap opera set in a supermarket chain.
- Supercharly (Telecinco, 2010) 5 episodes. Unsuccessful superhero comedy.
- Supervillanos (La Sexta, 2006) 6 episodes of 20 minutes. Some Martians have to adapt to the Earthlings customs.
- Suspiros de España (TVE, 1974) 13 episodes of 30 minutes. Independent episodes about criticism of common attitudes of Spaniards.

== T ==
- Tal para cual (TVE, 1965) 13 episodes of 30 minutes. Comedy.
- Taller Mecánico (TVE, 1991–1992) 20 episodes of 50 minutes. Comedy about a family with a repair shop.
- Tango (TVE, 1991) 8 episodes of 60 minutes. A man returns from America to runs a cabaret.
- Tarancón, el quinto mandamiento (La 1, 2011) Miniseries of 2 episodes. Series based on the life of cardinal Tarancón.
- Los Tele-Rodríguez (TVE, 1957) 13 episodes of 25 minutes. Comedy about a family obsessed with the arrival of television in Spain. First Spanish series.
- La templanza (Amazon Prime Video, 2021) 10 episodes. Romantic period drama.
- Temps de silenci (TV3, 2001–2002) 52 episodes of 50 minutes. Life of a wealthy family in Barcelona since shortly before the Spanish Civil War to the present. (in Catalan)
- Tengo un libro en las manos (TVE, 1959/1966) 22 episodes of 60 minutes. Adaptations of books.
- El teniente Lorena (TVE, 1991) 3 episodes of 75 minutes. Series set in the late nineteenth century, in the last years of constitutional monarchy in Portugal.
- Las tentaciones (TVE, 1970–1971) 13 episodes of 50 minutes. A woman faces several sinful temptations.
- Tercera planta, inspección fiscal (TVE, 1991) 13 episodes of 45 minutes. Comedy about a tax inspector.
- Tercero izquierda (TVE, 1963) 13 episodes of 25 minutes. Kind comedy about a community of neighbors.
- Teresa de Jesús (TVE, 1984) Miniseries of 8 episodes of 60 minutes. Life of Teresa of Ávila.
- Teresina S.A. (TV3, 1992) 13 episodes of 30 minutes. Comedy about three female dressmakers and their neighbors. (in Catalan)
- Terra de Miranda (TVG, 1992) 138 episodes of 70 minutes. A veterinary with three daughters goes to a village in Galicia to escape from her past. (in Galician)
- Terranova (TV3/ETB/TVG, 1994) Miniseries of 4 episodes of 30 minutes. A fisherman is shipped with a selfish captain.
- La tía de Ambrosio (TVE, 1971) 12 episodes of 30 minutes. Comedy about a bachelor who lives with his aunt.
- El tiempo entre costuras (Antena 3, 2013 – 2014) 11 episodes of 70 minutes. Story of a dressmaker in the 1930s.
- Tiempos de guerra (Antena 3, 2017) Series set during the Rif War
- Tiempo y hora (TVE, 1965–1967) 37 episodes of 25 minutes. Independent events with the theme of the importance of time in our lives.
- Tierra de lobos (Telecinco, 2010–2014) In the late nineteenth century by two outlaws fleeing from justice.
- Tío Willy (TVE, 1998–1999) 26 episodes of 50 minutes. A man who had to flee from Spain for being gay during Franco's years, returns to his country.
- La tira (La Sexta, 2008–2010) 20 episodes of 30 minutes. Gag series with four stories per episode (about two nightclub bouncers, three astronauts, some mothers at the door of a school, two female supermarket cashiers and a marriage with a never-ending home reform)
- Tirando a dar (Telecinco, 2006) 5 episodes of 50 minutes. A comedy about office workers insurance.
- Tita Cervera: la baronesa (Telecinco, 2011) Miniseries of 2 episodes. Biopic of Carmen Cervera.
- Todas las mujeres (TNT, 2010) 6 episodes of 25 minutes. Story of a man explained through six women of his life.
- Todo lo otro (HBO Max, 2021) 8 episodes. Dramedy.
- Todos a bordo (Antena 3, 1995) 1 episode of 70 minutes. Unsuccessful adaptation of The Love Boat.
- Todos los hombres sois iguales (Telecinco, 1996–1998) 67 episodes of 50 minutes. Comedy about three friends who are just divorced and decide to live together.
- Toledo (Antena 3, 2012) Historical fiction about a nobleman in the 13th century.
- Toonimals! (Telecinco, 2001–2002) 26 episodes. Animation. Animals, tired of humans, decide to start their own show.
- Tormenta (Antena 3, 2013). Miniseries of two episodes. A group of psychology studentes volunteer for an experiment.
- Tot queda en familia (TV3, 1986) 12 episodes of 16 minutes. Comedy about the contradictions and discussions of a family. (in Catalan)
- Tot un senyor (TV3, 1989) 13 episodes of 30 minutes. Comedy about a bachelor bank clerk who has to move to a village. (in Catalan)
- Toy Boy (Antena 3, 2019 – present) Thriller
- Tragedias de la vida vulgar (TVE, 1964–1965) 13 episodes of 50 minutes. Comedy.
- Traición (La 1, 2017–2018) 9 episodes. Family drama
- Tras la puerta cerrada (TVE, 1964–1965) 10 episodes of 50 minutes. Independent episodes of horror.
- Tres eran tres (TVE, 1972–1973) 13 episodes of 50 minutes. Three sisters who barely know each other have to live together.
- Tres estrelles (TV3, 1987) 6 episodes of 25 minutes. Gag series set in a hotel. (in Catalan)
- Tres hijos para mí solo (Antena 3, 1995) 13 episodes of 50 minutes. A widower and father have to take care of his three children.
- Las tres mellizas (TV3, 1994–2004) 104 episodes of 25 minutes. Animation. Triplets who, every time they do something wrong, are punished for the Bored Witch, which sends them to various stories and historical times to learn.
- Las tres mellizas bebés (TV3) episodes of 3 minutes. Animation. Sequel of Las tres mellizas for toddlers.
- Los tres mosqueteros (TVE, 1970–1971) 12 episodes of 30 minutes. Adaptation of The Three Musketeers.
- Tres son multitud (Telecinco, 2003) 15 episodes of 50 minutes. Following a breakup, the methodical and severe Roberto takes a firm decision not to fall in love with another woman. However, Lola, the wife of his enemy Guillermo appears in his life.
- Tristeza de amor (TVE, 1986–1987) 13 episodes of 60 minutes. Tragicomedy set in the world of radio.
- Los Trotamúsicos (TVE, 1989–1990) 26 episodes of 25 minutes. Animation. A dog, a rooster, a donkey and a cat create a music band.
- Truhanes (Telecinco, 1993–1994) 26 episodes of 50 minutes. Life of two swindlers.
- Tú tranquilo (TVE, 1965) 13 episodes of 30 minutes. Comedy.
- Turno de oficio (TVE, 1986–1987) (TVE, 1986–1987) 17 episodes of 60 minutes. Law drama.
- Turno de oficio: Diez años después (TVE, 1996) Law drama, sequel of the above set 10 years later.
- Twipsy (TV3, 2000) 52 episodes of 30 minutes. Dibujos animados. Series based on the official mascot of Expo 2000.
- Txirrita (ETB, 2009–?) episodes of 10 minutes. Animation. Series base the bertsolari Txirrita.

== U ==
- UCO (Unidad Central Operativa) (TVE, 2008–2009) 13 episodes of 60 minutes. Cops have to investigate some bank robbers.
- El último café (TVE, 1970–1972) 13 episodes of 60 minutes. Comedy of manners about the vicissitudes of a group of neighbors and friends who usually gather around a bar.
- El último show (Aragón TV, 2020–present) Drama about and old comedian who was successful in the past.
- El último verano (Telecinco, 1999) Miniseries of 5 episodes of 30 minutes. Four young people meet in a camp on the Mediterranean island of Ibiza.
- L’un per altre (TV3, 2003–2005) 39 episodes of 30 minutes. Family comedy about a bizarre family and the peculiar wife's parents. (in Catalan)
- Una de dos (TVE, 1998–1999) 26 episodes of 60 minutes. Comedy about twin sisters of different characters who have to live together after fifteen years apart.
- Unha de romanos (TVG, 1991) Absurd comedy set in both Ancient Rome times and present day. In includes hidden camera segments. Galician.
- La unidad (Movistar+, 2020). Police thriller television series.
- Unisex (Canal Sur, 1993) 13 episodes of 30 minutes. Comedy about a quirky barber.

== V ==
- La vaca Connie (La 2, 2001 – 2004) 130 episodes of 7 minutes. Animation. Adventures of a curious cow.
- Valderrei (TVG, 2007) 90 episodes of 35 minutes. A woman with two children goes to a Galician village to restart her life. (in Galician)
- Valientes (Cuatro, 2010) Soap opera
- La Vall (À Punt, 2018) A village offers houses to avoid depopulation. (in Catalan).
- Vamos Juan (TNT, 2020), sequel to Vota Juan.
- Valterra (IB2, 2005–2006) 208 episodes of 45 minutes. A landowner decides to appoint a sole heir.
- Velvet (Antena 3, 2014 – 2016) Series set in a prét-a-porter shop in 1958.
- Velvet Colección (#0, 2017–present) Spin-off of Velvet
- Vendetta (TVE, 1987) 6 episodes of 60 minutes. Revenges of the Italian Camorra.
- Ventdelplà (TV3, 2005–2010) 365 episodes of 60 minutes. A woman abused by her husband flees from Barcelona to the (fictional) village Ventdelplà. (in Catalan)
- Veneno (Atresplayer Premium, 2020) 8 episodes of 50 minutes. biographical drama centered on transgender singer and actress Cristina Ortiz "La Veneno".
- Veraneantes (TVE, 1984) 8 episodes of 50 minutes. Three wealthy families vacationing in El Escorial in three key moments in the history of Spain.
- Verano azul (TVE, 1981–1982) 19 episodes of 55 minutes. Several friends, children and adolescents spend the summer in a town on the Andalusian Costa del Sol.
- Verano del 36 (TVE, 1986) Miniseries of 2 episodes of 90 minutes. Series set in France and Spain in 1936.
- La verdad (Telecinco 2018–present) A little girl disappears and appears again years later as a teenager.
- La verdad de Laura (TVE/La 2/TVE Internacional, 1986) 129 episodes of 40 minutes. A 22-year girl alternates her studies with her work on the car workshop of her father, José, a man of bad character.
- Vergüenza (#0, 2017–present) Comedy
- Les veus del Panamo (TV3, 2009) Miniseries of 2 episodes of 90 minutes. In the years of Franco, a mayor falsely charges a teacher with a crime. (in Catalan)
- VHS (TNT, 2011–2012) comedy set in a weird rental shop.
- La via Augusta (TV3, 2007) 12 episodes of 60 minutes. Coexistence between patricians and slaves. (in Catalan)
- Viajes alrededor de una pareja (TVE, 1970) 12 episodes of 30 minutes. Everyday problems in a marriage.
- El viatge (TV3, 1987–1988) 12 episodes of 30 minutes. 400 years in the future, three young people face strange creatures. (in Catalan)
- La víctima número 8 (Telemadrid and ETB, 2018) Thriller
- Víctor Ros (La 1, 2015) Police series set in 1895.
- La vida de Rita (TVE, 2003) 13 episodes of 50 minutes. Comedy set in a bar.
- La vida en el aire (La 2, 1998) 13 episodes of 50 minutes. Life of some Spanish students.
- Vida loca (Telecinco, 2011) 12 episodes of 25 minutes. Comedy.
- Vida perfecta (Canal 0, 2019) The life of three women in their 30s change unexpectedly
- Vida privada (TVE, 1987) Miniseries of 4 episodes of 60 minutes. Life of a wealthy family of the late 1920s.
- Vientos de agua (Telecinco, 2006) Miniseries of 13 episodes of 75 minutes. A Spaniard emigrates to Argentina in 1934, fleeing political, and his son emigrates to Spain in 2001 due to economic crisis in that country.
- Villa Rosaura (TVE, 1994) 13 episodes of 30 minutes. Comedy about a family of thieves.
- Villarriba y Villabajo (TVE, 1994–1995) 26 episodes of 60 minutes. Comedy about the rivalry of two villages.
- La virtud del asesino (TVE/La 2, 1998) 13 episodes of 50 minutes. Investigation done by a police inspector to discover a series of murders of leading figures from the artistic and social world.
- Vis a vis (Antena 3, 2015 – 2016) A young naive woman is sent to prison.
- Vis a vis: El Oasis (Fox España, 2020) spin-off of Vis a vis.
- Vísperas (TVE, 1987) miniseries of 6 episodes of 60 minutes. Parallel lives of two friends from different social classes.
- Visto para sentencia (TVE, 1971) 13 episodes of 50 minutes. Dramatizations of actual prosecutions.
- Viuda, pero menos (La 2, 1982) 13 episodes of 30 minutes. A widow discovers that her husband was not as she thought.
- Las viudas (TVE, 1977) 13 episodes of 50 minutes. Comedy about the way women from different eras and places face her widowhood.
- Viva Luisa (Telemadrid, 2008) 8 episodes of 45 minutes. A housewife decides to return to her former profession, journalism.
- Vive cantando (Antena 3, 2013 – 2014) An orchestra singer has to take care of his nephews in a humble district of Madrid.
- Vivir sin permiso (Telecinco, 2018–present) A businessman wants to choose an heir.
- Vota Juan (TNT, 2019) Comedy about a candidate to be prime minister of Spain.
- Vuelo IL 8714 (Telecinco, 2010) Miniseries of 2 episodes. Series based on the accident of Spanair Flight 5022.
- La vuelta al mundo de Willy Fog (TVE, 1983) 26 episodes of 25 minutes. Animation. Adaptation of Around the World in Eighty Days.

== W ==
- Web Therapy (#0, 2016) Spanish version of the American series.
- Willy Fog 2 (TVE, 1994) Animation. Sequel of La vuelta al mundo de Willy Fog.

== X ==
- Xooof! (TV3/TVE, 1983) 13 episodes of 25 minutes. Surreal comedy about 3 castaways in a tiny island.

== Y ==
- Y al final, esperanza (TVE, 1967) 13 episodes of 60 minutes. Drama scripted by Antonio Gala.
- Yo quisiera (Divinity, 2015–present) Series about a 16-year-old girl with a blog.
- Yo robo, tú chantajeas, ella estafa (TVE, 1984) Miniseries of 4 episodes of 50 minutes. Comedy about some thieves.
- Yo soy Bea (Telecinco, 2006–2009) 773 episodes of 45 minutes. Soap opera about a 26-year-old girl who is ugly but kind and clever. Spanish version of Yo soy Betty, la fea.
- Yo, una mujer (Antena 3, 1996) 13 episodes of 50 minutes. A marriage starts falling apart after 28 years together.

== Z ==
- Zipi y Zape (Antena 3, 2003 – 2005) 26 episodes of 13 minutes. Animated series based on the child twins of Spanish comics Zipi y Zape.
- Zombis (TNT, 2011) Surreal comedy about a zombie apocalypse.
- Zoo (TV3, 2008) 23 episodes of 60 minutes. Series set in the zoo of Barcelona.
- Zoobabu (Clan, 2011) 104 episodes of 2 minutes.

== Bibliography ==
- Diccionario de series de televisión Los 100 mejores títulos. Luis Miguel Cardona. ISBN 978-84-96613-37-9
- PALACIO, Manuel: Una historia de la televisión en España. ISBN 84-7432-806-3
