= Pablo Derqui =

Spanish actor

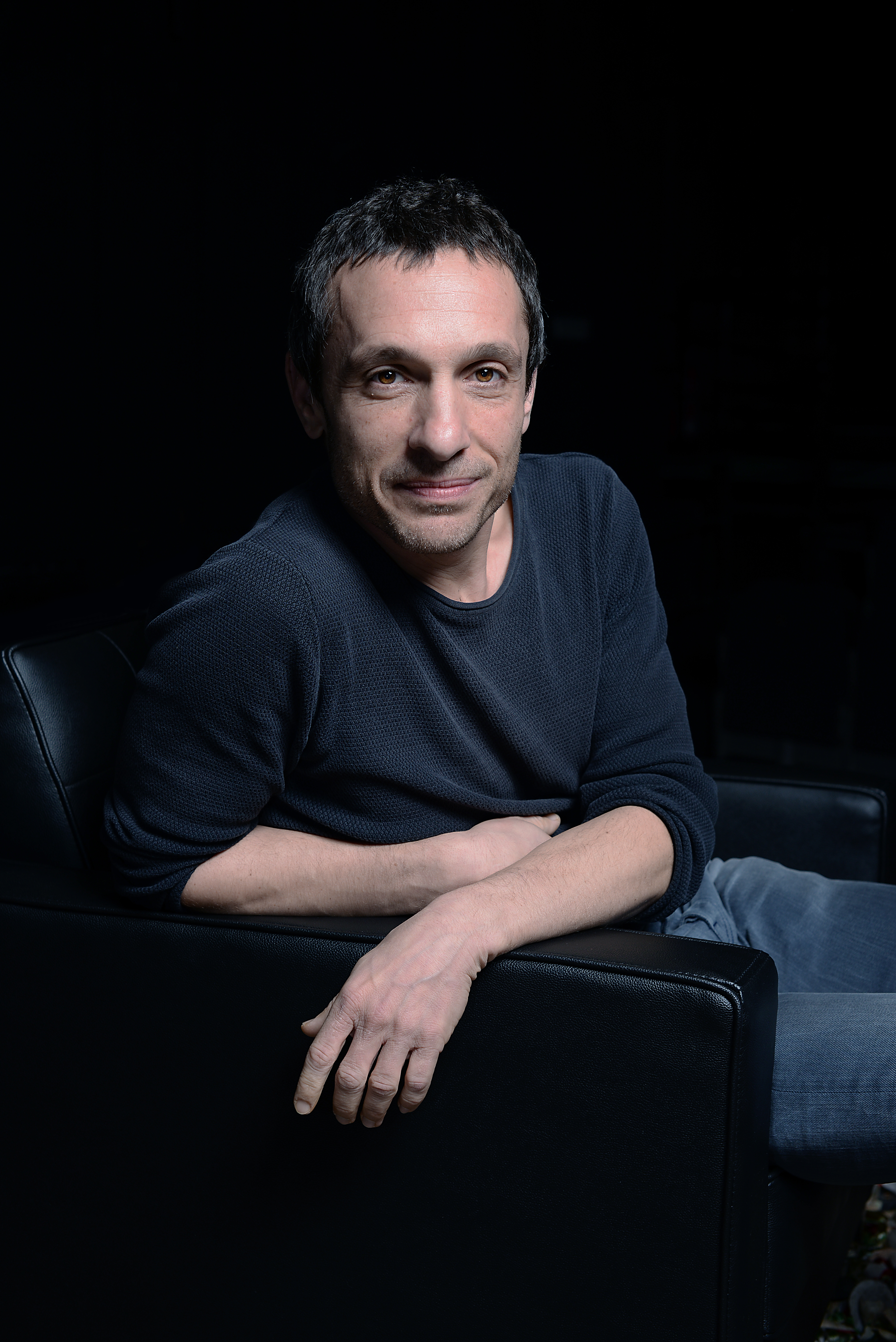
- Born: Pablo Derqui Maestre; 10 August 1976 (age 50); Barcelona, Catalonia, Spain
- Education: Institut del Teatre
- Occupation: Actor

Pablo Derqui Maestre (born 1976) is a Spanish actor from Catalonia. An accomplished stage actor, he is better known to the wider public for his performances in television series such as Hispania, Isabel, Pulsaciones or Cathedral of the Sea.

== Biography ==
Born on 10 August 1976 in Barcelona, Pablo Derqui Maestre is "family-related and spiritually" linked to Petrer, province of Alicante. After earning a degree in humanities, he earned an acting degree from the Barcelona's Institut del Teatre.

Some of his stage credits include performances in plays such as Roberto Zucco, Desde Berlín, L'orfe del clan dels Zhao, Una giornata particolare and Calígula.

== Filmography ==
=== Film ===
Year	Title	Role	Notes	Ref.
2006	Salvador	Jordi		
2010	Los ojos de Julia (Julia's Eyes)	Iván		
2016	Neruda	Víctor Pey		
2017	María (y los demás) (María (and Everybody Else))	Jorge		
2020	La vampira de Barcelona (The Barcelona Vampiress)	Fuster		
2021	Dos (Two)	David		
2022	Los renglones torcidos de Dios (God's Crooked Lines)	Ignacio Urquieta		
2023	Honeymoon	Víctor		
2024	L'home dels nassos (The Monster of Many Noses)	Pau Monsó		
2024	Anatema (Anathema)	Padre Ángel		
2026	Eixam (Swarm)	Jordi		

=== Television ===
Year	Title	Role	Notes	Ref.
2002	Temps de silenci	Enric Comelles		
2007	El síndrome de Ulises	Andrés Santolaya		
2010–12	Hispania, la leyenda	Héctor	Main. Seasons 1–3	
2012	Isabel	Enrique IV	Main. Season 1	
2016	Nit i dia	Lluís Forés		
2016–17	Pulsaciones	Alejandro Puga	Main	
2018	Si no t'hagués conegut (If I Hadn't Met You)	Eduard		
2018	La catedral del mar (Cathedral of the Sea)	Joan		
2019	La caza. Monteperdido	Álvaro Montrell		
2020	La línea invisible	Chamorro		
2022	Historias para no dormir (Stories to Stay Awake)		Episode "El televisor"	
2025	Su majestad	Alfonso XVI		

== Accolades ==
Year	Award	Category	Work	Result	Ref.
2013	22nd Actors and Actresses Union Awards	Best Television Actor in a Leading Role	Isabel	Nominated	
2020	23rd Max Awards	Best Actor in a Leading Role	Com els grecs	Nominated	
