= Andrea Ros =

Spanish actress

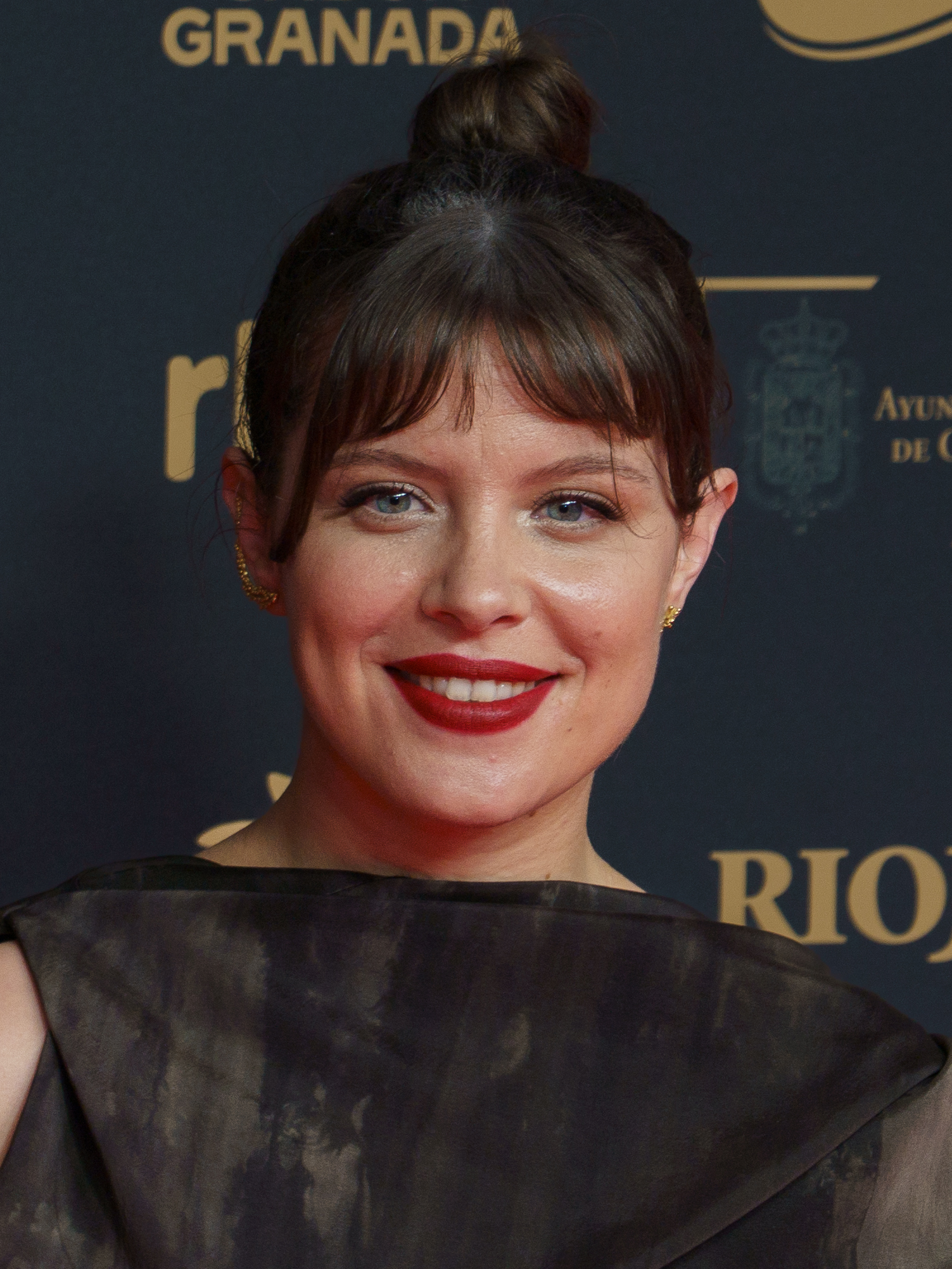
- Ros in 2025
- Born: 3 May 1993 (age 32); Terrassa, Catalonia, Spain
- Occupation: Actress
- Years active: 2004–present

Andrea Ros (born 3 May 1993) is a Spanish film, theater and television actress.

== Biography ==
Ros began her career with small roles in television series in Catalonia, and also participated in several plays and short films.

Her first big opportunity came when she was presented by Casting Director Laura Cepeda to participate in the film Salvador (Puig Antich) BY Manuel Huerga playing Merçona, one of the sisters of the protagonist. From 2006 to 2007 she was part of the recurring cast of the TV3 series Mar de fons, where she played Sílvia Fuster. In 2008 she participated in the miniseries Cazadores de Hombres and in the youth series El Internado, both produced by Antena 3. In 2009 she participated in Jaume Balagueró's horror film [REC]2, where she played Mire.

In 2010 she joined the ninth season of the series Los hombres de Paco as a recurring character. In addition, she also starred in the film El diario de Carlota by José Manuel Carrasco.

In 2011 she premiered the series Punta Escarlata on Cuatro, and also joined the cast of the comedy series BuenAgente on La Sexta, which aired for two seasons.

During the following two years she participated in several film productions. She was part of the cast of the films La fría luz del día by Mabrouk El Mechri, Tengo ganas de ti by Fernando González Molina, Menú degustación by Roger Gual, Al final todos mueren and Pixel Theory.

Also in 2013 she took to the boards with Javier Calvo and Javier Ambrossi La Llamada, which starred alongside Macarena García during the first two seasons of the show.

In 2015 she joined the tenth season of the Antena 3's tabletime series Amar es para siempre where she plays Beatriz Arratia. Also that year she premiered the first season of the series Mar de Plástico giving life to Mar Sánchez.

In October 2016, during the Sitges Fantastic Film Festival, she premiered the film La sexta alumna, a horror drama shot entirely with an iPhone 6.

In July 2018 she denounced that the director of the Teatre Lliure, Lluís Pasqual, had shouted at her and ridiculed her in a rehearsal. The controversy raised on social networks led to the resignation of Lluís Pasqual.

== Filmography ==
=== Television ===
- El cor de la ciutat, as Teresa, two episodes (2004)
- Mar de fons, as Silvia Fuster (2006–2007)
- Cazadores de hombres, as Ariadna, two episodes: Operación Ojos Cerrados (1st and 2nd parts) (2008)
- El internado, as María Almagro, three episodes (2008–2009)
- Águila Roja, as Blanca (2010)
- Los hombres de Paco, as Adela (2010)
- Aída, as Begoña, one episode: La loca, loca historia de la bola loca (2010)
- BuenAgente, as Natalia "Nata" (2011)
- Punta Escarlata, as Victoria "Vicky" Picazo (2011)
- Con el culo al aire, as Raquel, one episode (2014)
- Amar es para siempre, as Beatriz Arratia (2015)
- Mar de plástico, as María del Mar "Mar" Sánchez Almunia (2015)
- Si no t'hagués conegut, as Elisa (2018)
- Terror y feria (1 episode)

=== Feature films ===
- Salvador (Puig Antich) (2006)
- REC 2 (2009)
- El diario de Carlota (2010)
- La fría luz del día (2011)
- Tengo ganas de ti (2012)
- Menú degustació (2013)
- Al final todos mueren (2013)
- La final (2015)
- Es por tu bien (2017)
- Las leyes de la termodinámica (2017)
- ¿A quién te llevarías a una isla desierta? (2019)
- A mil kilómetros de la Navidad (2021)

=== Short films ===
- Hannah o Miley (2012)
- 8 (2011)
- La noche rota (2011)
- Vico Bergman (2017)

=== Theater ===
- Tirant lo Blanc – Directed by Montse Sala
- Divinas palabras – Directed by Montse Sala
- Conte saharaui – Directed by Montse Sala
- La sireneta – Directed by Montse Sala
- Un fantasma – Directed by Nyusca Gorenko
- El labrador de más aire – Directed by Miguel Hernández
- La princesa que dormía – Directed by Montse Sala
- El drac de Sant Jordi – Directed by Montse Sala
- Planeta Gómez Kaminsky – Directed by Álvaro Aránguez
- La llamada – Directed by Javier Ambrossi y Javier Calvo
- Un enemic del poble- Directed by Miguel del Arco
- L'Onada – Marc Montserrat Drukker
- El rey Lear- Directed by Lluis Pasquall
- El Temps que Estiguesim Junts – Directed by Pablo Messiez
