= 1000 Miles from Christmas =

- Netflix release poster
- Spanish: A mil kilómetros de la Navidad
- Directed by: Álvaro Fernández Armero
- Written by: Francisco Arnal; Daniel Monedero
- Produced by: Kiko Martínez
- Starring: Tamar Novas; Andrea Ros
- Production company: Nadie es Perfecto PC
- Distributed by: Netflix
- Release date: 24 December 2021 (Netflix)
- Country: Spain
- Language: Spanish

1000 Miles from Christmas (Spanish: A mil kilómetros de la Navidad) is a 2021 Spanish Christmas romantic comedy film directed by Álvaro Fernández Armero which stars Tamar Novas and Andrea Ros. A Netflix original film, it was released on 24 December 2021.

== Plot ==
A Scrooge-like Christmas-abhoring man, Raúl, is tasked to audit a Turrón-making factory in a remote Christmas-loving village, where he also faces the prospect of sharing a roof with Paula, the local teacher, hellbent on staging the largest living nativity scene ever.

== Cast ==
- Tamar Novas as Raúl.
- Andrea Ros as Paula.
- Peter Vives as Mateo.
- Fermí Reixach
- Verónica Forqué as Blanca.

== Production ==
1000 Miles from Christmas was directed by Álvaro Fernández Armero and written by Francisco Arnal and Daniel Monedero. Produced by Kiko Martínez (Nadie es Perfecto PC), shooting began on 22 December 2020 in Madrid. Production moved to the Pyrenees (province of Lleida and province of Huesca), shooting in Arties (Aran Valley) and Benasque. In February 2021, production resumed in Guadalajara, shooting in the Fuerte San Francisco. Footage was also shot in various locations across the Madrid region and the province of Segovia.

== Release ==
A Netflix original film, 1000 Miles from Christmas was released on 24 December 2021. The movie featured in the Netflix global top 10s for 2 weeks picking up 13.59M hours.

== See also ==
- List of Spanish films of 2021
- List of Christmas films
