= Anathema (film) =

- Theatrical release poster
- Spanish: Anatema
- Directed by: Jimina Sabadú
- Screenplay by: Jimina Sabadú; Elio Quiroga
- Produced by: Álex de la Iglesia; Carolina Bang
- Starring: Leonor Watling; Pablo Derqui; Jaime Ordóñez; Keren Hapuc; Juan Codina; Margarita Lascoiti; Juan Manuel Montilla 'El Langui'
- Cinematography: Luis Ángel Pérez
- Music by: Vanessa Garde
- Production companies: Pokeepsie Films; The Fear Collection IV AIE
- Distributed by: Sony Pictures International Productions
- Release dates: 2 November 2024 (LBFF); 8 November 2024 (Spain)
- Country: Spain
- Language: Spanish

Anathema (Spanish: Anatema) is a 2024 Spanish Gothic horror film directed by Jimina Sabadú (in her directorial debut feature) and written by Sabadú and Elio Quiroga. It stars Leonor Watling alongside Pablo Derqui, Keren Hapuc, and Jaime Ordóñez.

== Plot ==
Acting on behalf of the Archdiocese, hard-boiled nun sor Juana gets into a church in Old Madrid built over a maze of underground passages, finding that Evil has taken root.

== Cast ==
- Leonor Watling as Juana Rabadán
- Pablo Derqui as padre Ángel ('father Ángel')
- Keren Hapuc
- Jaime Ordóñez
- Mauro Brussolo
- Mariano Llorente
- Manuel de Blas
- Xoán Fórneas
- Juan Codina
- Margarita Lascoiti
- Juan Manuel Montilla 'El Langui'

== Production ==
The screenplay was written by Jimina Sabadú and Elio Quiroga. Sabadú stated that the film "is a story of Gothic horror with roots rooted in the most ancestral Madrid, that of passages and lost architectures". The film is a Pokeepsie Films production, and it had the association of Sony Pictures International Productions and the participation of Prime Video. It was lensed by Luis Ángel Pérez. Shooting locations in Madrid and Bizkaia included Bilbao and the Pozalagua Cave in Karrantza.

== Release ==
The film was selected for a special screening at Tokyo's Latin Beat Film Festival (LBFF) on 2 November 2024. It is scheduled to be released theatrically in Spain on 8 November 2024.

== Reception ==
Carmen L. Lobo of La Razón rated the film 3 out of 5 stars, positively highlighting Watling's dedicated performance and the supernatural entities' looks, while negatively mentioning some somewhat jarring lines and mawkish ending.

Philipp Engel of Cinemanía rated the film 3½ out of 5 stars, writing that "all is well on its costumbrista side", which can be encapsulated in the phrase "blacker than Pantoja's hair", pronounced by one of the characters.

== See also ==
- List of Spanish films of 2024
