= Salvador (2006 film) =

Salvador (Puig Antich)
- Theatrical release poster
- Directed by: Manuel Huerga
- Written by: Lluís Arcarazo
- Based on: Compte enrere. La història de Salvador Puig Antich by Francesc Escribano
- Produced by: Jaume Roures
- Starring: Daniel Brühl; Tristán Ulloa; Leonardo Sbaraglia; Leonor Watling; Ingrid Rubio
- Cinematography: David Omedes
- Music by: Lluís Llach
- Distributed by: Warner Bros. Pictures
- Release dates: May 2006 (Cannes); 15 September 2006 (Spain)
- Running time: 134 minutes
- Countries: Spain; United Kingdom
- Languages: Catalan; Spanish; French

Salvador (Puig Antich) (or Salvador) is a 2006 biographical political drama film directed by Manuel Huerga starring Daniel Brühl as Salvador Puig Antich. It is based on the 2001 book Compte enrere. La història de Salvador Puig Antich by Francesc Escribano, which depicts the time Puig Antich spent on death row prior to his execution by garrote (the last person to be executed by this method in Spain) in 1974, in the last rales of the Francoist dictatorship.

The film was screened in the Un Certain Regard section at the 2006 Cannes Film Festival.

== Cast ==
- Daniel Brühl as Salvador Puig Antich
- Tristán Ulloa as Oriol Arau
- Leonardo Sbaraglia as Jesús Irurre
- Leonor Watling as Cuca
- Ingrid Rubio as Margalida
- Celso Bugallo as Salvador's father
- Mercedes Sampietro as Salvador's mother
- Olalla Escribano as Imma Puig
- Carlota Olcina as Carme Puig
- Bea Segura as Montse Puig
- Andrea Ros as Merçona Puig
- Jacob Torres as Santi Soler
- Joel Joan as Oriol Solé
- Pau Derqui as Jordi Solé
- Oriol Vila as Ignasi Solé
- Raül Tortosa as Quim Puig Antich
- Biel Durán as José Luis
- Aida Folch as Marian
- Joaquim Climent as Policia BPS (1)
- Antonio Dechent as Policia BPS (2)
- Carlos Fuentes as Paco

== See also ==
- List of Spanish films of 2006
