= Arròs covat =

Arròs covat (in Catalan, "Past rice") is a Spanish animated series, created by cartoonist Juanjo Sáez for Televisió de Catalunya. It narrates about the life of Xavi Masdéu, a graphic designer with a goal to rebuild his life after breaking up his relationship with Sonia, his lifelong girlfriend. Sáez himself has explained it as "the conflict of getting older."

The name of the series refers to the saying "pass the rice", which means having lost the appropriate age to do something specific. Arròs covat was awarded an Ondas Award in 2010, the comic has been edited with the storyboard of the series and has been broadcast for the rest of Spain on the pay channel TNT, with dubbing into Spanish by the original cast of actors.

== Synopsis ==
Xavi Masdéu is a graphic designer who, after turning 30, feels like he is losing all the opportunities in his life. Despite having his own graphic design studio, being a cosmopolitan person and being in love with his girlfriend Sonia, he begins to rethink his relationship when he realizes that he keeps being interested in all the women he meets, like the young woman. Light. When Sonia separates from Xavi, he must rethink his entire professional and sentimental world, and assume his maturity.

In addition to Xavi, other characters appear in the series such as his aunt Paquita, with whom he usually eats rice every Thursday, and his study companions Lluis and Ricard.

Each chapter is titled with a type of rice, which is related to the theme of the plot.

== Setting ==
Music plays an important role in the series, with winks and references to the independent scene. The original soundtrack is composed by the Maik Maier collective, including the opening theme performed by Miguel Ángel Blanca, singer of Manos de Topo. In addition, songs by Catalan groups are included (Standstill, Love of Lesbian, La Casa Azul), from the Barcelona label BCore, and artists such as the disc jockey Marc Piñol (Shitty DJ) or the singer Joe Crepúsculo are parodied. Even the dubbing actor who plays Xavi Masdeu is the singer-songwriter Joan Dausà. The sound effects are usually vocalized onomatopoeia.

== Chapters ==
Each chapter is titled with a type of rice, which is related to the theme of the plot:

=== Season 1 ===
- Chapter 1: Arròs a banda (rice a banda)
- Chapter 2: Arròs a la cubana (Cuban-style rice)
- Chapter 3: Arròs mar y muntanya (sea and mountain rice)
- Chapter 4: Arròs integral (brown rice)
- Chapter 5: Envelopes d'arròs (leftover rice)
- Chapter 6: Arròs boratxo (drunken rice)
- Chapter 7: Arròs amb llamàntol (rice with lobster)
- Chapter 8: Arròs de la mama : (mother's rice)
- Chapter 9: Madrid stew
- Chapter 10: Menu menu (menu rice)
- Chapter 11: Arròs amb sushi (rice with sushi)
- Chapter 12: Arròs negre (black rice)

=== Season 2 ===
- Chapter 13: Arròs amb llet (rice pudding)
- Chapter 14: Arròs brut (dirty rice)
- Chapter 15: Arròs de la Paquita (Paquita rice)
- Chapter 16: Empatx d'arròs (rice empancho)
- Chapter 17: Arròs gelat (frozen rice)
- Chapter 18: Covada d'arròs (rice pass)
- Chapter 19: Pastis d'arròs (rice cake)
- Chapter 20: Arròs d'arengs amb mostassa a la mel (herring rice with honey mustard)
- Chapter 21: Super arròs (super rice)
- Chapter 22: Arròs sènior (senior rice)
- Chapter 23: Arròs suec (Swedish rice)
- Chapter 24: Arròs Bomba (bomb rice)

=== Season 3 ===
- Chapter 25: Arròs per a tres (rice for three)
- Chapter 26: Arròs del paleolític (palaeolithic rice)
- Chapter 27: Arruiz Zafón
- Chapter 28: Arròs inflat (part 1) (puffed rice, part 1)
- Chapter 29: Arròs inflat (part 2) (puffed rice, part 2)
- Chapter 30: Arròs a la malaguenya (malagueña-style rice)
- Chapter 31: Arròs infidel (unfaithful rice)
- Chapter 32: Responsible Arròs (responsible rice)
- Chapter 33: Arròs amb llamàntols i una gamba (rice with lobsters and a prawn)
- Chapter 34: Arròs sense delícies (rice without delicacies)
- Chapter 35: Arròs del passat Nadal (rice of Christmas past)
- Chapter 36: Wedding Arròs (Wedding Rice)
