= BuenAgente =

Spanish streaming television series

- Genre: Comedy; Sitcom
- Starring: Antonio Molero; Malena Alterio; Arturo Valls; Carmen Ruiz; Patricia Montero; Raúl Fernández
- Country of origin: Spain
- Original language: Spanish
- No. of seasons: 2
- No. of episodes: 19

Production
- Production company: Globomedia

Original release
- Network: LaSexta
- Release: 5 May – 2 December 2011

BuenAgente is a Spanish comedy television series that originally aired on LaSexta from 5 May 2011 to 2 December 2011. The cast is led by Antonio Molero, Malena Alterio, Arturo Valls, Carmen Ruiz, Patricia Montero and Raúl Fernández.

== Premise ==
Lola tells her husband Sebas that she is leaving him. Sebas does not give up and moves to a new residence (together with Olivia and Ana) near Lola's to try to be closer to his two children, Nata and Alex. The police station where Sebas works in is also welcoming new agents.

== Cast ==
- Antonio Molero as Sebas
- Malena Alterio as Lola
- Arturo Valls as Agus
- Carmen Ruiz as Olivia
- Patricia Montero as Ana.
- Raúl Fernández as Teo
- Itziar Lazkano as Casilda
- Juan Antonio Lumbreras as Pascual
- María Isasi as Charo
- Andrea Ros as Nata
- Nacho Montes as Alex.
- Adrián Lastra as Jorge
- Patricia Conde as Paula Noval
- Luis Varela as Jesús Cobo.
- Jaime Blanch as Juan, Sebas' father.

== Production and release ==
BuenaGente was produced by Globomedia for LaSexta. The series premiered on 5 May 2011, earning 1,853,000 viewers and a 9.2% audience share (the best premiere of any LaSexta original fiction up to that date). The broadcasting run of the 8-episode first season ended on 20 June 2011, averaging 1,205,375 viewers and a 6.6% audience share. As LaSexta decided to ax the series, shooting wrapped on 26 October 2011. The 11-episode second season ran from 7 September to 2 December 2011, averaging 878,364 viewers and a 5.1% audience share.

Series	Episodes	Originally released		
Series	Episodes	First released	Last released	Network
1	8	5 May 2011	20 June 2005	laSexta
2	11	7 September 2011	2 December 2011	laSexta

=== Season 1 ===
No. overall	No. in season	Title	Original release date
1	1	"Piloto"	5 May 2011
2	2	"El inquilino"	12 May 2011
3	3	"Una cena para tres"	22 May 2011
4	4	"Los celos"	29 May 2011
5	5	"El hombre de sus sueños"	5 June 2011
6	6	"La mejor compañía"	13 June 2011
7	7	"La competencia"	13 June 2011
8	8	"Son cosas del amor"	20 June 2011

=== Season 2 ===
No. overall	No. in season	Title	Original release date
9	1	"Cambios vitales"	7 September 2011
10	2	"Lola está celosa"	14 September 2011
11	3	"El agobio"	28 September 2011
12	4	"El padre de Sebas"	14 October 2011
13	5	"El amor mueve barreras"	21 October 2011
14	6	"Cinco meses y cuatro días después"	28 October 2011
15	7	"En la cola del paro"	4 November 2011
16	8	"La sospecha"	11 November 2011
17	9	"Menos porras y más porros"	18 November 2011
18	10	"Los ángeles de Charlie"	25 November 2011
19	11	"El buen agente"	2 December 2011
