= 13 x 13 =

- Genre: Educational
- Developed by: Televisió de Catalunya
- Directed by: Francesc Nel-lo
- Starring: Francesc Orella; Muntsa Alcañiz; Carme Contreras; Ángels Aymar; Josep Maria Doménech
- Country of origin: Spain
- Original language: Catalan
- No. of seasons: 1
- No. of episodes: 13

Production
- Running time: 50 minutes

Original release
- Network: TV3
- Release: October 2, 1987 – 1988

13 x 13 was a Catalan TV series which aired in TV3. It described some adaptations of Catalan literature. 13 episodes were aired in 1987 and 1988.

== Cast ==
- Francesc Orella
- Muntsa Alcañiz
- Carme Contreras
- Ángels Aymar
- Josep Maria Doménech
