= 16 dobles =

- Genre: Drama
- Directed by: Orestes Lara
- Starring: Marta Marco; Crisitina Bofill; Marc Humet; Ángels Gutiérrez; Oscar Morales
- Country of origin: Spain
- Original language: Catalan
- No. of seasons: 2
- No. of episodes: 26

Production
- Camera setup: Multi-camera
- Running time: 50 minutes
- Production companies: Diagonal TV; Televisió de Catalunya

Original release
- Network: TV3
- Release: January 8 – December 31, 2003

Related
- Temps de silenci

16 dobles was a Catalan TV series which was aired on TV3. It was directed by Orestes Lara. 26 episodes were aired between January and December 2003. The series is a (sort of) sequel of Temps de silenci.

== Cast ==
- Marta Marco
- Marc Humet
- Ángels Gutiérrez
- Oscar Morales
- Nuria Prims
- Cristina Brondo
- David Janer
- Miquel Sitjar
