= If I Hadn't Met You =

2018 Catalan-language supernatural television series

- Catalan: Si no t'hagués conegut
- Genre: Drama; Fantasy
- Created by: Sergi Belbel
- Directed by: Belén Macías; Antonio Cuadri; Sergio Cabrera
- Starring: Pablo Derqui; Andrea Ros; Mercedes Sampietro
- Country of origin: Spain
- Original language: Catalan
- No. of seasons: 1
- No. of episodes: 10

Production
- Running time: 60 min
- Production company: Diagonal TV

Original release
- Network: TV3
- Release: 15 October – 17 December 2018

If I Hadn't Met You (Catalan: Si no t'hagués conegut) is a Spanish Catalan-language fantasy television series created by Sergi Belbel that originally aired on TV3 from 15 October to 17 December 2018. It stars Pablo Derqui, Andrea Ros, and Mercedes Sampietro, among others.

== Synopsis ==
The plot revolves around Eduard, who loses his wife Elisa and their kids in a car accident. Later, a mysterious woman known as Dr. Everest teaches Eduard how to travel to alternate universes, which leads him to try to find a world in which his family can be saved.

== Cast and characters ==
- Pablo Derqui as Eduard Marina
- Andrea Ros as Elisa Montcalm
- Javier Beltrán as Òscar
- Paula Malia as Clara
- Montse Guallar as Maria
- Mercedes Sampietro as Liz Everest
- David Vert as Pere
- Muguet Franc as Tere
- Abel Folk as Joan
- Sergi López as Manel
- Miquel García Borda as Lluís Antich

== Production and release ==
The series was created by Sergi Belbel. Produced by Diagonal TV, it had support from the Department of Culture of the Generalitat de Catalunya. The series was pre-screened at the Sitges Film Festival. It premiered on TV3 on 15 October 2018. The original broadcasting run ended on 17 December 2018.
