= Temps de silenci =

Catalan-language television series

- Genre: Soap opera Period drama
- Country of origin: Spain
- Original language: Catalan
- No. of episodes: 53

Production
- Running time: 50 min (approx.)
- Production companies: Diagonal TV; TVC

Original release
- Network: TV3
- Release: 17 January 2001 – 10 April 2002

Related
- 16 dobles

Temps de silenci (lit. 'Time of Silence') is a Catalan-language soap opera. It aired from 2001 to 2002 on TV3.

== Premise ==
The fiction follows the lives of three families during the Francoist dictatorship: the Dalmau-Muntaner, representatives of the Catalan bourgeoisie; the Comes, a Catalan artisan family, and the Hernández-Utrera, representatives of the immigrant working class, intermingling the grand narrative of history and the little stories of characters' daily lives.

While largely set in the Francoist dictatorship, the fiction eventually spanned to the marriage of Cristina de Borbón and Iñaki Urdangarín in 1997.

== Production and release ==
It premiered on 17 January 2001. Consisting of fifty three 50-minute long episodes, the broadcasting run ended on 10 April 2002. It was produced by Diagonal TV and TVC.

The series sparked a spin-off, 16 dobles.
