= The Greek Labyrinth =

- Theatrical release poster
- Spanish: El laberinto griego
- Directed by: Rafael Alcázar
- Screenplay by: Manuel Vázquez Montalbán; Rafael Alcázar
- Story by: Manuel Vázquez Montalbán
- Starring: Omero Antonutti; Aitana Sánchez-Gijón; Eusebio Poncela
- Cinematography: Tote Trenas
- Edited by: Miguel González Sinde
- Music by: Bernardo Bonezzi
- Distributed by: Impala
- Release date: 8 January 1993
- Running time: 96 minutes
- Country: Spain
- Language: Spanish

The Greek Labyrinth (Spanish: El laberinto griego) is a 1993 Spanish thriller film directed by Rafael Alcázar based on a story by Manuel Vázquez Montalbán which stars Omero Antonutti, Aitana Sánchez-Gijón, and Eusebio Poncela. It is set in and around the city of Barcelona.

== Cast ==
- Omero Antonutti as Bardón
- Aitana Sánchez-Gijón as Bernadette
- Eusebio Poncela as Jacques Lebrun
- José Pedro Carrión as escultor
- Terele Pávez as Remei
- Fernando Guillén Cuervo as Bardón hijo
- Carlos Lucena as Fraguas
- Magüi Mira as Luz
- Francisco Merino as Detres
- Penélope Cruz as Elisa

== Release ==
The film was released theatrically in Spain on 8 January 1993.

== Accolades ==
Year	Award	Category	Nominee(s)	Result	Ref.
1993	7th Goya Awards	Best Adapted Screenplay	Manuel Vázquez Montalbán, Rafael Alcázar	Nominated	

== See also ==
- List of Spanish films of 1993

== Bibliography ==
- Benavent, Francisco María (2000). Cine español de los 90. Diccionario de películas, directores y temático. Bilbao: Ediciones Mensajero. ISBN 84-271-2326-4.
