= Eusebio Poncela =

Spanish actor (1945–2025)

- Born: Eusebio Poncela Aprea; 15 September 1945; Madrid, Spain
- Died: 27 August 2025 (aged 79); El Escorial, Spain
- Education: Real Escuela Superior de Arte Dramático
- Occupation: Actor
- Years active: 1967–2025

Eusebio Poncela Aprea (15 September 1945 – 27 August 2025) was a Spanish screen and stage actor. He developed his career in both his native country and Argentina, featuring in films such as Rapture (1979), Law of Desire (1987), and Martín (Hache) (1997). His work in Intact (2001) earned him a nomination for a Goya Award for Best Actor.

His television career included roles in Los gozos y las sombras, Las aventuras de Pepe Carvalho, Isabel, and Carlos, rey emperador, for which he won an Iris Award for Best Actor.

== Early life and education ==
Eusebio Poncela Aprea was born in Madrid on 15 September 1945, and was raised in Vallecas. In his childhood, he was kicked out from eight schools. He trained at the Real Escuela Superior de Arte Dramático. He graduated from the same class as Marisa Paredes and Juan Diego.

== Career ==
Poncela made his theatre debut in a play of Mariana Pineda in 1967. He earned clout on the Spanish stage scene, with ensuing roles in plays of Marat/Sade, Romeo and Juliet, and A Taste of Honey, after which he developed a screen career in film and television. The latter play premiered in March 1971 at the Teatro Infanta Beatriz, and, starring Poncela as a young gay man alongside Ana Belén and Laly Soldevila, obtained great success.

His film career took off in the 1970s. In the anthology horror film Pastel de sangre (1971), he played a part as the Monster in the segment directed by Jaime Chávarri dedicated to Victor Frankenstein. He also featured in Eloy de la Iglesia's The Cannibal Man (1972), portraying a homosexual character. The Spanish film cut was nonetheless mutilated by the Francoist censorship. He also appeared in Pedro Olea's A House Without Boundaries (1972), in Larga noche de julio (1974), in La muerte del escorpión (1976), and in In memoriam (1977), starring alongside Geraldine Chaplin and José Luis Gómez. In 1978, he appeared in the television series Curro Jiménez.

He starred as the lead of the cult film Rapture, directed by Iván Zulueta, a key instance of experimental film produced in Spain during the Transition. In the film, which was not successful upon its release, he portrayed a director of low-budget horror movies vampirised by the effect of addictions to cinema and heroin. In Guillo Pontecorvo's Ogro, he portrayed one of the ETA members who carried out the magnicide of Carrero Blanco. He attained mainstream recognition in 1982 with his work in the Televisión Española series Los gozos y las sombras. He starred as the lead, a police inspector, in the crime film El arreglo (1983), in what Diego Galán described as an "honest, effective" performance despite the character's lack of nuance. He also continued his stage career, featuring in a play of Cat on a Hot Tin Roof (1984). He played a police inspector again in Pedro Almodóvar's Matador (1986). Also in 1986, he starred in Pilar Miró's Werther, a film adaptation of Goethe's novel selected for the 43rd Venice International Film Festival, and starred as detective Pepe Carvalho in the crime television series Las aventuras de Pepe Carvalho.

With Antonio Banderas, Poncela co-starred in Law of Desire (1987), playing a gay film and theatre director. His character in the film has been read as placed within the framework of an intertextual relation with prior roles played by Poncela in La muerte del escorpión and Rapture.

In the 1990s, he lived in Argentina, featuring in films such as A Shadow You Soon Will Be (1994), Martín (Hache) (1997), and La sonámbula. He also garnered notoriety in the country for his participation in the music video for Los Fabulosos Cadillacs's "Matador" and for collaborations with his close Argentine acquaintance Fito Páez (Balada de Donna Helena and "Sasha, Sisí y el círculo de baba"). He portrayed the Devil in "Pacto", an Argentine television commercial for Renault Clio.

In the 2000s, Poncela returned to Spain. In the fantasy thriller Intact (2001), he played a man gifted with the ability to steal luck from others. His performance in the film earned him his only Goya Award nomination. He also appeared in Black Serenade (2001) and 800 Bullets (2002). At the 2004 Gijón International Film Festival, he received the Nacho Martínez Award.

With the turn of the century, as the pace of his work in film slowed down, the weight of his career in television series increased. He played the cardinal Casimiro Morcillo, president of the Spanish Episcopal Conference, in the TVE miniseries Tarancón, el quinto mandamiento about the life of Cardinal Tarancón. He portrayed another cleric, Cardinal Cisneros, in the third season of the historical series Isabel, reprising the role in the sequel series Carlos, Rey Emperador, in a crossover episode of El ministerio del tiempo, and in the feature film The Broken Crown. His television work also included villain roles in Red Eagle and El accidente. In advance of the 2017 Sant Jordi Awards ceremony, Poncela was announced as the recipient of the Sant Jordi Special Award for Lifetime Achievements. Late television roles include his appearance in the season 2 of Merlí: Sapere Aude (2021) playing a mentor to the protagonist and his portrayal of a psychiatrist in the psychological thriller series Matices (2025).

In 2022, Poncela starred in a play of Manuel Puig's Kiss of the Spider Woman directed by Carlota Ferrer. He also received the LesGaiCineMad festival's honorary award at Cine Doré.

The Last Rapture, a documentary film about Rapture featuring Poncela, was presented in September 2025 at the 73rd San Sebastián International Film Festival.

His work as a family patriarch in the thriller series The Tribute (which he finished shooting shortly before his death) was post-humously released on SkyShowtime in April 2026.

== Personal life and death ==
Poncela was a recovering heroin addict. In a 2022 interview to Vanity Fair, he described himself as "quite solitary and misanthropic". He stated that he managed to kick his heroin habit after moving to Argentina. Likewise, seeking to set a distance from his addictions, Poncela left the centre of Madrid for El Escorial. (Note: "And regarding his addictions, he said that they had forced him to flee Madrid for El Escorial, where he died: 'I fled the city center. They wouldn't give me a break; when people get obsessed with drugs, they will not leave you alone. My house looked like Keith Richards'".) He self-defined as "trisexual" and gay.

Poncela died at his residence in El Escorial, on 27 August 2025, at the age of 79. The cause of his death was cancer, which he had been suffering from for over a year. His wake was held at the funeral home of San Isidro in Madrid and was attended by colleagues such as Luis Tosar and Luisa Mayol.

== Filmography ==
=== Film ===
Year	Title	Role	Notes	Ref.
1971	Pastel de sangre	El monstruo		
1972	La semana del asesino (The Cannibal Man)	Néstor		
1972	Fuenteovejuna	Frondoso		
1979	Arrebato (Rapture)	José Sirgado		
1979	Operación Ogro (Ogro)	Txabi		
1983	El arreglo	Crisanto Perales		
1986	Matador	Comisario		
1987	La ley del deseo (Law of Desire)	Pablo Quintero		
1988	El Dorado	Fernando de Guzmán		
1988	Diario de invierno (Winter Diary)	León		
1990	Continental	Otálora		
1991	El invierno en Lisboa	Floro Bloom		
1991	El rey pasmado (The Dumbfounded King)	Conde de la Peña Andrada		
1992	El juego de los mensajes invisibles	Jaime		
1992	El beso del sueño	Fernando Delgado		
1993	El laberinto griego (The Greek Labyrinth)	Jacques Lebrun		
1994	Una sombra ya pronto serás (A Shadow You Soon Will Be)	Lem		
1997	Martín (Hache)	Dante		
1998	La sonámbula	Ariel Kluge		
1999	La sombra de Caín	Esteban		
2001	Cabecita rubia (Lost Horizon)	Tulan		
2001	Sagitario	Jaime		
2001	Tuno negro (Black Serenade)	Don Justo		
2001	Intacto (Intact)	Federico		
2002	800 balas (800 Bullets)	Scott		
2004	Occhi di cristallo (Eyes of Crystal)	Professor Civita		
2005	Hermanas (Sisters)	Luis Morini		
2006	Los Borgia (The Borgia)	Cardenal Giuliano della Rovere		
2006	Remake	Álex		
2007	Teresa, el cuerpo de Cristo (Theresa: The Body of Christ)	Gaspar Daza		
2009	I Come with the Rain	Vargas		
2010	La herencia Valdemar (The Valdemar Legacy)	Maximilian		
2011	La herencia Valdemar II: La sombra prohibida (The Valdemar Legacy II: The Forbidden Shadow)	Maximilian Colvin		
2011	Querida, voy a comprar cigarrillos y vuelvo	Inmortal		
2016	La corona partida (The Broken Crown)	Cardenal Cisneros		

=== Television ===
Year	Title	Role	Notes	Ref.
1982	Los gozos y las sombras	Carlos Deza		
1986	Las aventuras de Pepe Carvalho	Pepe Carvalho		
2011	Tarancón, el quinto mandamiento	Casimiro Morcillo	TV movie released as a 2-episode miniseries	
2013–14	Isabel	Cardenal Cisneros		
2015	El ministerio del tiempo	Cardenal Cisneros	Season 1; episode "Una negociación a tiempo"	
2015–16	Carlos, rey emperador	Cardenal Cisneros		
2015–16	Águila Roja (Red Eagle)	Malasangre		
2017–18	El accidente	João Ferreira		
2021	Merlí: Sapere Aude	Dino	Season 2	
2025	Matices	Doctor Marlow		
2026	El homenaje (The Tribute)	Adolfo Novak	Post-humously released	

== Accolades ==
Year	Award	Category	Work	Result	Ref.
1998	46th Silver Condor Awards	Best Supporting Actor	Martín (Hache)	Won	
2002	16th Goya Awards	Best Actor	Intact	Nominated	
2015	24th Actors and Actresses Union Awards	Best Television Actor in a Secondary Role	Isabel	Nominated	
2016	18th Iris Awards	Best Actor	Carlos, rey emperador	Won	
