= The Broken Crown =

- Theatrical release poster
- Spanish: La corona partida
- Directed by: Jordi Frades
- Written by: José Luis Martín
- Starring: Rodolfo Sancho; Irene Escolar; Raúl Mérida; Eusebio Poncela; Fernando Guillén Cuervo; José Coronado
- Cinematography: Raimon Lorda
- Edited by: Carlos J. Sanavia
- Music by: Federico Jusid
- Production companies: Diagonal TV; R. Zinman Productions
- Distributed by: A Contracorriente Films
- Release date: 19 February 2016
- Country: Spain
- Language: Spanish

The Broken Crown (Spanish: La corona partida) is a 2016 Spanish historical drama film directed by Jordi Frades which stars Irene Escolar, Rodolfo Sancho and Raúl Mérida, among others. The fiction serves as bridge in between the television series Isabel and Carlos, rey emperador.

== Premise ==
Set in early 16th century, the fiction focuses on the events after the death of Queen Isabella of Castile and the issuing of the corresponding will. Isabella's daughter Joanna finds herself in the middle of the political schemes of her father Ferdinand and her spouse Philip, son of Maximilian of Habsburg, with everyone in the Court having a vested interest in declaring her mad and unfit to rule.

== Cast ==
- Rodolfo Sancho as Fernando
- Irene Escolar as Juana
- Raúl Mérida as Felipe
- Eusebio Poncela as Cardenal Cisneros
- Fernando Guillén Cuervo as Fuensalida
- José Coronado as Maximiliano de Habsburgo
- Jacobo Dicenta as Belmonte
- Úrsula Corberó as Margarita de Austria
- Ramon Madaula as Chacón
- Ainhoa Santamaría as Beatriz de Bobadilla
- Jordi Díaz as Cabrera
- Silvia Alonso as Germana de Foix

== Production ==
The Broken Crown, Jordi Frades' debut as feature film director, was written by José Luis Martín. The score was composed by Federico Jusid. The film was produced by Diagonal TV and R. Zinman Productions, with the participation of RTVE and the collaboration of Elipsis Capital. Filming started in May 2015, shooting in locations such as the Castle of Guadamur, the Cathedral of Burgos, the Cathedral of Toledo, the Church of Santa María Magdalena in Torrelaguna and the Palace of Rincón in Madrid. Raimon Lorda worked as cinematographer whilst Carlos J. Sanavia took over film editing.

== Release ==
Distributed by A Contracorriente Films, the film was theatrically released in Spain on 19 February 2016.

== See also ==
- List of Spanish films of 2016
