= Fernando Guillén Cuervo =

Spanish actor and filmmaker (born 1963)

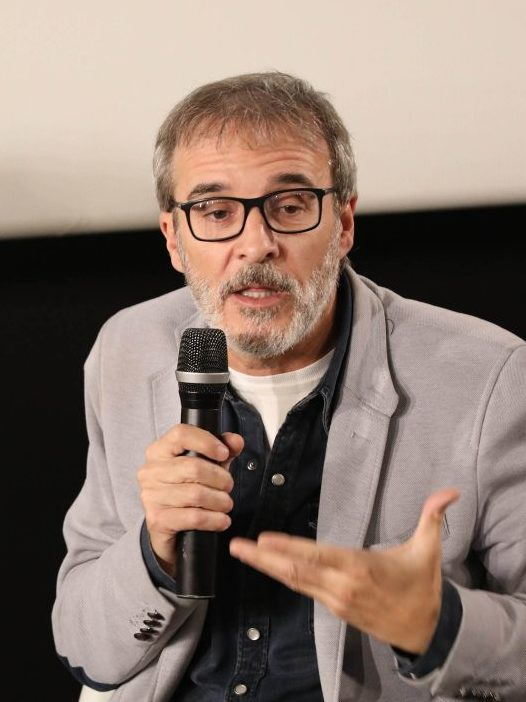
- Born: Fernando Guillén Cuervo; March 11, 1963 (age 63); Barcelona, Spain
- Occupations: Actor, filmmaker
- Spouses: Elena González (m. 1996–2011); Ana Milán (m. 2014–2016)
- Parents: Fernando Guillén (father); Gemma Cuervo (mother)
- Relatives: Cayetana Guillén Cuervo (sister)

Fernando Guillén Cuervo (born March 11, 1963) is a Spanish actor, film director and scriptwriter.

== Biography ==
Born on March 11, 1963, in Barcelona in a family of thespians to father Fernando Guillén and mother Gemma Cuervo. Cayetana (also an actress) and Natalia are his siblings. He featured as a child actor in the television series La saga de los Rius (1976–1977). He began his professional career in theatre, working as an assistant stage director at the Madrid's Teatro Bellas Artes.

He made his feature film debut as a director in the 2000 film Año mariano, which he co-directed alongside Karra Elejalde. He co-wrote the script of the 2002 film Bulgarian Lovers alongside Eloy de la Iglesia, adapting the novel Los novios búlgaros by Eduardo Mendicutti. His first solo film as a director was the 2006 comedy Los managers.

He was married to Elena González from 1996 to 2011. He married actress Ana Milán in 2014. They signed their divorce in January 2016.

== Filmography ==
Year	Title	Role	Director	Notes / Ref.
1982	Pestañas postizas		Enrique Belloch	
1984	Memorias del general Escobar	José Escobar	José Luis Madrid	
1985	Nosotros en particular	Fernando	Domingo Solano	
1985	Crimen en familia	Óscar	Santiago San Miguel	
1986	Oficio de muchachos	Nicky	Carlos Romero Marchent	
1987	Law of Desire	Policía hijo	Pedro Almodóvar	
1987	La señora	Josep	Jordi Cadena	
1989	El mar y el tiempo	Pepe	Fernando Fernán-Gómez	
1990	Boom boom	Ángel	Rosa Vergés	
1990	Las edades de Lulú	Marcelo	Bigas Luna	
1990	Doblones de a ocho	Fernando Jr.	Andrés Linares	
1991	El invierno en Lisboa	El invierno en Lisboa	José A. Zorrilla	
1991	La noche más larga		José Luis García Sánchez	
1992	Amor en off		Koldo Izaguirre	
1992	1492: Conquest of Paradise	Giacomo	Ridley Scott	
1992	Shooting Elisabeth	Jose	Baz Taylor	
1993	Havanera 1820	Alfons	Antonio Verdaguer	
1993	El laberinto griego	Bardón hijo	Rafael Alcázar	
1993	Tres palabras	Alfredo Jr.	Antonio Giménez-Rico	
1994	A business affair	Ángel	Charlotte Brandstrom	
1994	El día nunca, por la tarde	Valeriano	Julián Esteban	
1994	Alsasua 1936	Marino Ayerra	Helena Taberna	Short
1995	Boca a boca	Raúl	Manuel Gómez Pereira	
1996	Gran Slalom	Tamara	Jaime Chávarri	
1996	Corsarios del chip	Raúl Gamboa	Rafael Alcázar	
1996	Calor... y celos	Carlos	Javier Rebollo	
1997	Airbag	Konradín	Juanma Bajo Ulloa	
1998	Un buen novio	Álex	Jesús R. Delgado	
2000	Año mariano	Tony Towers	Karra Elejalde and Fernando Guillén Cuervo	
2001	No te fallaré	Ray	Manuel Ríos San Martín	
2001	Testigos ocultos	Iván Odesky	Néstor Sánchez Sotelo	
2002	Todo menos la chica	Ángel	Jesús R. Delgado	
2002	Nowhere	Benavente	Luis Sepúlveda	
2002	Talk to Her	Doctor	Pedro Almodóvar	Uncredited
2002	El florido pensil	Jefe falangista	Juan José Porto	
2002	El caballero Don Quijote (Don Quixote, Knight Errant)	Secretario	Manuel Gutiérrez Aragón	
2003	Bulgarian Lovers	Daniel	Eloy de la Iglesia	
2004	Tiovivo c. 1950	Higinio	José Luis Garci	
2004	Madrileña bonita		Pasqual Osa and Jesús Peñas	
2005	Vorvik	Víctor	José Antonio Vitoria	
2006	The Inquiry	Saul of Tarsus	Giulio Base	
2007	Luz de Domingo	Ramón	José Luis Garci	
2008	Reflections	Álvarez	Bryan Goeres	
2008	Camino	Sacerdote Colegio	Javier Fesser	Uncredited
2008	Sangre de Mayo	Regente de imprenta	José Luis Garci	
2008	Quantum of Solace	Carlos - Colonel of Police	Marc Forster	
2010	The Last Circus	Capitán miliciano	Álex de la Iglesia	
2010	Cruzando el límite	Óscar	Xavi Giménez	
2012	Una historia criminal		José Durán	
2016	La corona partida	Gutierre Gómez de Fuensalida	Jordi Frades	
2016	El signo de Caronte		Néstor F. Dennis	
2018	Sin novedad	Marcos	Miguel Berzal de Miguel	

== Television ==
Series	Year	Role	Notes
La leyenda del cura de Bargota	1989	Padre Juan	
Oh, Espanya!	1996		
Gioco di specchi	2000		
Javier ya no vive solo	2002–2003	Manu	
Amb el 10 a l'esquena	2004	Carlos	TV movie
Mis estimadas víctimas	2005	José Antonio	TV movie
Los misterios de Laura	2009–2014	Jacobo Salgado	
Isabel	2014	Gutierre Gómez de Fuensalida	
El Caso. Crónica de sucesos	2016	Jesús Expósito	
El ministerio del tiempo	2017	Francisco de Sandoval y Rojas, 1st Duke of Lerma	
