= Bulgarian Lovers =

2003 film by Eloy de la Iglesia

- Theatrical release poster
- Spanish: Los novios búlgaros
- Directed by: Eloy de la Iglesia
- Written by: Fernando Guillén Cuervo; Eloy de la Iglesia
- Based on: Los novios búlgaros by Eduardo Mendicutti
- Produced by: Pedro Olea; Fernando Guillén Cuervo; Jesús G. Ciordia; Eduardo Campoy
- Starring: Fernando Guillén Cuervo; Dritan Biba; Pepón Nieto; Anita Sinkovic
- Cinematography: Néstor Calvo
- Edited by: José Salcedo
- Music by: Antonio Melived
- Production companies: Cartel; Altube Filmeak; Cuervo Films; Conexión Sur
- Release dates: 13 February 2003 (Berlinale); 30 April 2003 (Spain)
- Running time: 101 minutes
- Country: Spain
- Languages: Spanish; Bulgarian; English

Bulgarian Lovers (Spanish: Los novios búlgaros) is a 2003 Spanish romantic comedy-drama film directed by Eloy de la Iglesia. It is based on the novel of the same name by Eduardo Mendicutti.

== Plot ==
The plot centers around Daniel, a well-off gay lawyer in Madrid. He is part of a group of gay Spanish men who cruise for sex, which is treated as a form of domination. Daniel forms a relationship with an attractive Bulgarian expatriate, Kyril, for whom he makes extraordinary efforts, such as forging papers and smuggling uranium. Daniel and his wealth are contrasted with Kyril and his good looks.

== Cast ==
- Fernando Guillén Cuervo as Daniel
- Dritan Biba as Kyril
- Pepón Nieto as Gildo
- Roger Pera as lawyer
- Anita Sinkovic as Kalina
- Fernando Albizu as Mogambo
- Roman Luknár as Simeón
- Simón Andreu as Daniel's father
- Julia Martínez as Daniel's mother
- Gracia Olayo as Rosita
- Emma Penella as Remedios
- Aure Sánchez as Bambi
- Shai Bercovich as Vladimir
- Labinot Nuredini as Yordan
- Alberto Lozano
- Óscar Iniesta as Emil

== Production ==
The film was produced by Cartel, Altube Filmeak, Cuervo Films, and Conexión Sur.

== Release ==
The film screened in the 53rd Berlin International Film Festival in February 2003.

== Reception ==
David Stratton of Variety deemed the film to be "full of charm, entertaining enough as it unfolds, good looking, but not especially memorable in retrospect".

Stephen Holden of The New York Times assessed that the film manages to observe "the interplay of sex, power and money with a cool, amused attitude and a fine sense of social detail", "without becoming preachy or lapsing into fatuous psychological jargon".

== See also ==
- List of Spanish films of 2003
