= Rodolfo Sancho =

Spanish actor (born 1975)

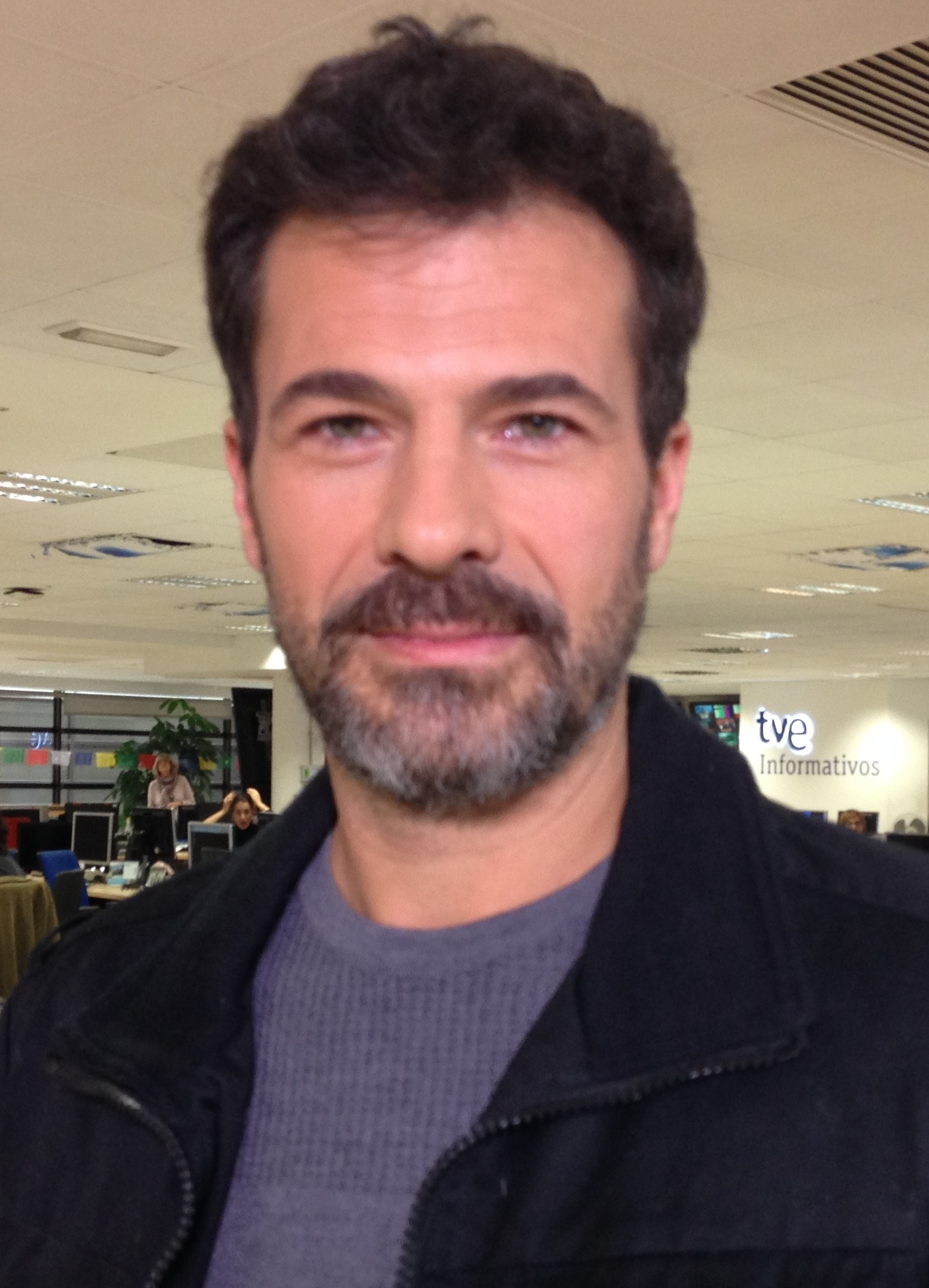
- Sancho in 2016
- Born: Rodolfo Sancho Aguirre; 14 January 1975 (age 51); Madrid, Spain
- Occupation: Actor
- Children: 2
- Parent: Sancho Gracia

Rodolfo Sancho Aguirre (born 14 January 1975) is a Spanish actor. He is best known for portraying Ferdinand II of Aragon in the television series Isabel and the film La corona partida. He is also known for his television work in series such as Amar en tiempos revueltos, La Señora, and El ministerio del tiempo.

== Early life and education ==
Rodolfo Sancho Aguirre was born on 14 January 1975 in Madrid, son of Spanish actor Sancho Gracia and Uruguayan journalist Noela Aguirre Gomensoro. Adolfo Suárez served as godfather at his baptism.

As a child, Sancho Aguirre featured in acting roles in television series Los desastres de la guerra (age 8) and La huella del crimen (age 10).

== Career ==
After 1995, Sancho followed his father's footsteps with a professional acting career, primarily in television. Early work includes small television credits in Curro Jiménez. El regreso de una leyenda, Hermanos de leche, Carmen y familia, Colegio mayor and Turno de oficio: 10 años después.

He made his feature film debut in Enrique Urbizu's Cachito (1996), followed by small credits in Taxi (1996), Dying of Laughter (1999), and La comunidad (2000), in which he played a real estate agent.

Sancho gained early fame for his portrayal of Nicolás Medina Prieto "Nico" in 516 episodes of the teen drama series Al salir de clase from 1997 to 1999, thereby consolidating his television career.

He worked alongside Javier Florrieta (Pacto de brujas), Sigfrid Monleón (La bicicleta) and with Jorge Sánchez-Cabezudo in his directorial debut, La noche de los girasoles.

In 2012, he returned to La 1 for Isabel, a series depicting the life of Isabel I of Castile, portraying Fernando II of Aragón for three seasons before departing for another La 1 series, El Ministerio del Tiempo playing the part of Julián Martínez, a nurse working for SAMUR where he was a series regular for Season 1 and had a recurring role in the second season.

His work on El Ministerio del Tiempo was delayed as he starred as the lead role in Antena 3's Mar de plástico as Héctor.

Rodolfo appeared on streaming platform HBO MAX in true crime series El caso Sancho, about the murder of Edwin Arrieta by Sancho's son.

== Personal life ==
In 1994, Sancho had a son with actress Silvia Bronchalo when he was 19 years old. According to Sancho, previously self-described as a golfo ("rascal"), fatherhood made him a responsible person "all of a sudden".

In 2005, he entered a relationship with Xenia Tostado, with whom he had a daughter in 2015.

In August 2023, Sancho's son, Daniel Sancho Bronchalo, was indicted in Thailand on charges which included premeditated murder and concealment of a body, relating to the death of Edwin Arrieta Arteaga, a Colombian plastic surgeon, when both were on vacation in the country. His trial commenced in April 2024 during which he pleaded not guilty, and in August 2024 he was sentenced to life imprisonment.

== Filmography ==
=== Film ===
Year	Title	Role	Director
1995	Cachito	Camarero	Enrique Urbizu
1996	Taxi	Óscar	Carlos Saura
1997	La mirada del otro	Novio	Vicente Aranda
1999	Muertos de risa	Técnico 23-F	Álex de la Iglesia
2000	La comunidad	Pacheco	Álex de la Iglesia
2002	Mucha sangre	Choro	Pepe de las Heras
2003	Pacto de brujas	Ricardo	Javier Elorrieta
2005	Las llaves de la independencia	Luis	Carlos Gil
2005	Dentro del paraíso (TV)	Julio	Manuel Estudillo
2005	Cuba libre	Goyita	Raimundo García
2006	Los muertos van deprisa		Ángel de la Cruz
2006	La bicicleta	Jefe de obra	Sigfrid Monleón
2006	Películas para no dormir: La habitación del niño	Padre	Álex de la Iglesia
2006	La noche de los girasoles	Chico	Jorge Sánchez-Cabezudo
2007	El prado de las estrellas	Mauri	Mario Camus
2008	Trío de ases: El secreto de la Atlántida		Joseba Vázquez
2009	La herencia Valdemar	Eduardo	José Luis Alemán
2010	La herencia Valdemar II: La sombra prohibida	Eduardo	José Luis Alemán
2011	No habrá paz para los malvados	Rodolfo	Enrique Urbizu
2011	Artigas: La Redota	Aníbal Larra / Calderón	César Charlone
2011	Las nornas	Ares	Fernando J. Núñez
2016	La corona partida	Ferdinand II of Aragon	Jordi Frades
2019	El sueño del califa (De sable et de feu)	Ali Bey	Souheil Ben-Barka
2020	Voces	Daniel	Ángel Gómez Hernández
2020	El secreto de Ibosim	Manuel	Miguel Ángel Tobías
2021	Y todos arderán	David	David Hebrero
2022	La piel del tambor	Pencho Gavira	Sergio Dow
2023	Delfines de plata	Javier Gallardo	Javier Elorrieta
2024	Un paseo por el Borne	Martín	Nick Igea

==== Short films ====
Year	Title	Role	Director
1993	¿Dónde estáis?		David Calleja
1993	La muerte del Jinete		Rodolfo Sancho
1995	Cortometraje realizado por el TAI		Eva Lesmes (collaboration)
1999	Casi veinte horas	Camello	Luis López Varona
2000	Qué puta es mi hermana		Luis Montes Tradacete

=== Television ===
Year	Title	Role	Ref.
1983	Los desastres de la guerra		
1985	La huella del crimen		
1994	Colegio Mayor		
1994	Curro Jiménez II		
1995	Hermanos de leche		
1996	Carmen y familia		
1997	La vida en el aire		
1997–1999	Al salir de clase	Nico	
2000	Paraíso		
2002–2003	Policías, en el corazón de la calle		
2003	Código Fuego		
2003	Un paso adelante	Raúl	
2004	Hospital Central		
2004	Tres son multitud	Mateo Martínez	
2005	Lobos	Abel Estrada	
2005–2006	Amar en tiempos revueltos	Antonio Ramírez Grande	
2006	Películas para no dormir: La habitación del niño		
2007–2008	MIR	Dr. Eduardo Murúa	
2008–2010	La Señora	Ángel González Ruiz	
2010–2011	Gavilanes	Juan Reyes	
2011	14 de abril, La República		
2011	Historias robadas	Alejandro de las Matas	
2012–2014	Isabel	Ferdinand II of Aragon	
2015–2020	El Ministerio del Tiempo	Julián Martínez	
2015–2016	Mar de Plástico	Héctor Aguirre Millán	
2018	Los nuestros 2	Carlos Román	
2022	Sequía	Martín Ruiz	
2022	Los herederos de la tierra	Bernat Estanyol	
2024	Zorro	Gobernador Pedro Victoria	
2024	El caso Sancho	Himself	

=== Stage ===
Year	Production	Role	Ref.
1995	Misterio en el Circo de Irás y No Volverás		
1997	El cerco de Numancia		
1998–1999	Fedra	Hipólito	
2000–2001	Caos		
	Cedra		

== Awards ==
Iris Awards

Year	Category	Series	Result
2012	Best Male Performance	Isabel	Won
2013	Best Male Performance	Isabel	Won
2014	Best Male Performance	Isabel	Nominated

Fotogramas de Plata

Year	Category	Series	Result
2012	Best TV Actor	Isabel	Nominated
2013	Best TV Actor	Isabel	Nominated
2014	Best TV Actor	Isabel	Won
2015	Best TV Actor	El Ministerio del Tiempo	Nominated

Saraqusta Film Festival

Year	Category	Result
2021	Saraqusta Award	Won

Feroz Awards

Year	Category	Series	Result
2016	Best Main Actor in a Series	El Ministerio del Tiempo	Nominated
