= Señoras del (h)AMPA =

Television series

- Genre: Dark comedy
- Created by: Carlos del Hoyo; Abril Zamora
- Directed by: Carlos del Hoyo; Abril Zamora
- Starring: Toni Acosta; Malena Alterio; Nuria Herrero; Mamen García
- Country of origin: Spain
- Original language: Spanish
- No. of seasons: 2

Production
- Production companies: Mediaset España; Mandarina Producciones

Original release
- Network: Telecinco; Amazon Prime Video
- Release: 19 June 2019

Señoras del (h)AMPA is a Spanish dark comedy television series produced by Mediaset España and Producciones Mandarina. Created, written and directed by Carlos del Hoyo and Abril Zamora, it stars Toni Acosta, Malena Alterio, Nuria Herrero and Mamen García. The first season aired on Telecinco in 2019, yet the first part of the second season was released in exclusive by Amazon Prime Video.

== Premise ==
Four women meet at the sessions of the AMPA (Asociación de Madres y Padres de Alumnos, the conventional name for the interest groups of the students' parents and legal guardians in the Spanish education centres): Mayte (Toni Acosta); a seller of food processors, Lourdes (Malena Alterio), dedicated to processing identity cards at the neighborhood's police station; Virginia (Nuria Herrero), a young pregnant woman; and Amparo (Mamen García), an old woman taking care of her grandson. They casually got involved in an involuntary homicide that prompts them to ramp up in their criminal activities.

A substantial part of the fiction takes place in the streets of Carabanchel, Madrid.

== Cast ==
- Malena Alterio as Lourdes Sanguino.
- Toni Acosta as Mayte Soldevilla.
- Nuria Herrero as Virginia Torres.
- Mamen García as Amparo Peláez.
- Marta Belenguer as Elvira.
- Ainhoa Santamaría as Anabel.
- Álex Barahona as Curro.
- Gloria Muñoz as Carmona.
- Nuria González as Begoña Cepeda.
- Maite Sandoval as Juani Zaldívar.
- Fernando Coronado as Gregorio.
- Alfonso Lara as Vicente.
- Raúl Mérida as Arturo.
- Fernando Cayo as Pedro.
- Ana Fernández as Asunción.
- Dafnis Balduz as Mariano.
- Carmen Balagué as Remedios.
- Lorena López as Manoli.
- Alberto Velasco as Ramón.
- Juan Blanco as Carlos.
- Amparo Fernández as Doña Concha.
- Oriol Tarrasón as Rafa.
- Francisco Boira as Andrés.
- Manolo Caro as Berto.
- Fernando Valdivielso as Chivo.
- Bea de la Cruz as Paloma.
- Flavio Rey as Omar.
- Alicia Chojnowski as Aitana.
- María Martín Serrano as Aroa.
- Jun Felipe as Mari Carmen.
- Miguel Rivera as Goyo.
- Marina de Miguel as Arancha.
- Carla Campra as Elisabeth.

Introduced in Season 2

- Pilar Castro as Belinda Chamorro.

== Production and release ==
The series was produced by Mediaset España and Producciones Mandarina. It was created, written and directed by Carlos del Hoyo and Abril Zamora. Filming of the first season started in Madrid by July 2018.

The executive producers are Carlos del Hoyo, Santi Botello and Arantxa Écija.

The series was selected as the buyers' favourite out of 10 series pre-screened at the MIPDrama Summit during 2019 Cannes' MIPTV fair.

The first episode aired on 19 June 2019 on Telecinco and it earned a great free-to-air viewership, attracting 2,996,000 viewers and seizing a 20.9% share of the audience in prime time, becoming the most watched new fiction release in Telecinco in the season.

Filming for the second season started in October 2019. Pilar Castro, Mariola Fuentes and Julia Molins were added to the cast. Belgian RTBF, Brazilian Globosat, Latin-American OnDIRECTV and German Mediengruppe RTL Deutschland TVNOW broadcasters reached agreements with the Spanish distributor Mediterráneo Mediaset España Group to air the series in their respective markets, whereas rights for the adaptation of the series were purchased in Italy, Greece, Romania and Hungary.

The first part of the second season was eventually released on Amazon Prime Video on 16 October 2020. By late 2020, with the second part of the second season pending for release, the creator Carlos del Hoyo reported that they were working for the wrap-up of the series with a third and final season. The free-to-air release of season 2 was programmed by Telecinco for 26 April 2021, performing very poorly in the first episode (6.3% audience share). It was thus relocated from Telecinco to Cuatro and from Monday to Wednesday. In May 2021, NBC ordered a pilot for an US adaptation written by Janine Sherman Barrois, Dangerous Moms.

== Episodes ==
Series	Episodes	Originally released			Ref.
Series	Episodes	First released	Last released	Network	Ref.
1	13	19 June 2019	6 November 2019	Telecinco	
2	13	16 October 2020	9 April 2021	Amazon Prime Video	

=== Season 1 ===
No. overall	No. in season	Title	Original release date
1	1	"Señoras que matan"	19 June 2019
2	2	"Señoras atrapadas"	26 June 2016
3	3	"Señoras que ayudan a otras señoras"	3 July 2019
4	4	"Señoras empoderadas"	10 July 2019
5	5	"Señoras sin blanca"	17 July 2019
6	6	"Señoras que roban"	18 September 2019
7	7	"Señoras contra señoras"	25 September 2019
8	8	"Señoras pilladas"	2 October 2019
9	9	"Señoras a la fuga"	9 October 2019
10	10	"Señoras violentas"	16 October 2019
11	11	"Señoras heridas"	23 October 2019
12	12	"Señoras que mienten"	30 October 2019
13	13	"Señoras unidas"	6 November 2019

=== Season 2 ===
No. overall	No. in season	Title	Original release date
14	1	"Cuatro señoras y un funeral"	16 October 2020
15	2	"Señoras y el sexo"	16 October 2020
16	3	"Madre y señora"	16 October 2020
17	4	"¡Alto! O la señora dispara"	16 October 2020
18	5	"Señoras al rescate"	16 October 2020
19	6	"Señoras casi famosas"	16 October 2020
20	7	"Señoras católicas, apostólicas y romanas"	16 October 2020
21	8	"A dos señoras bajo tierra"	9 April 2021
22	9	"El disputado voto de las señoras"	9 April 2021
23	10	"¡Corre, señora, corre!"	9 April 2021
24	11	"Adivina qué señora viene a cenar esta noche"	9 April 2021
25	12	"Ahora es tarde, señora"	9 April 2021
26	13	"Señoras bien, señoras fetén"	9 April 2021

== Awards and nominations ==
Year	Award	Category	Nominees	Result	Ref.
2020	7th Feroz Awards	Best Main Actress in a Series	Toni Acosta	Nominated	
2020	29th Actors and Actresses Union Awards	Best Television Actress in a Leading Role	Toni Acosta	Nominated	
2020	70th Fotogramas de Plata	Best TV Actress	Toni Acosta	Won	
