= Everyone Will Burn =

- Release poster
- Spanish: Y todos arderán
- Directed by: David Hebrero
- Screenplay by: David Hebrero; Javier Kirán
- Produced by: David Hebrero; Javier Kirán; Enrique García-Gasco; Deja Gordon
- Starring: Macarena Gómez; Rodolfo Sancho; Ana Milán; Rubén Ochandiano; Sofía García
- Cinematography: Ona Isart
- Edited by: María Macias
- Music by: Joan Vilá
- Production company: Nostalgia Shop Films
- Distributed by: Filmin
- Release dates: 16 October 2021 (Sitges); 2 June 2023 (Spain)
- Running time: 115 minutes
- Country: Spain
- Language: Spanish

Everyone Will Burn (Spanish: Y todos arderán) is a 2021 Spanish supernatural horror drama film directed by David Hebrero which stars Macarena Gómez along with Rodolfo Sancho, Ana Milán, and Sofía García.

== Plot ==
The plot is set in a Spanish village. After ten years of living nightmare caused by the bullying-induced suicide of her son Lolo, María José, otherwise marginalized too by the village's inhabitants, decides to commit suicide. She is however stopped by Lucía, a mysterious girl with achondroplasia, later revealed to have supernatural abilities, burning a civil guard agent with her sheer gaze. With the girl seemingly related to an apocalyptic prophecy and the mayor's wife as María José's main foe, María José only enjoys some help from an altar server (Juan) among the townsfolks.

== Cast ==
- Macarena Gómez as María José
- Rodolfo Sancho as David
- Ana Milán as Tere
- Rubén Ochandiano as Juan
- Germán Torres as Padre Abelino
- Ella Kweku as Ari
- Guillermo Estrella
- Raquel Lobelos
- Sofía García as Lucía
- Fernando Cayo as Honorio
- Saturnino García as Gabriel

== Production ==
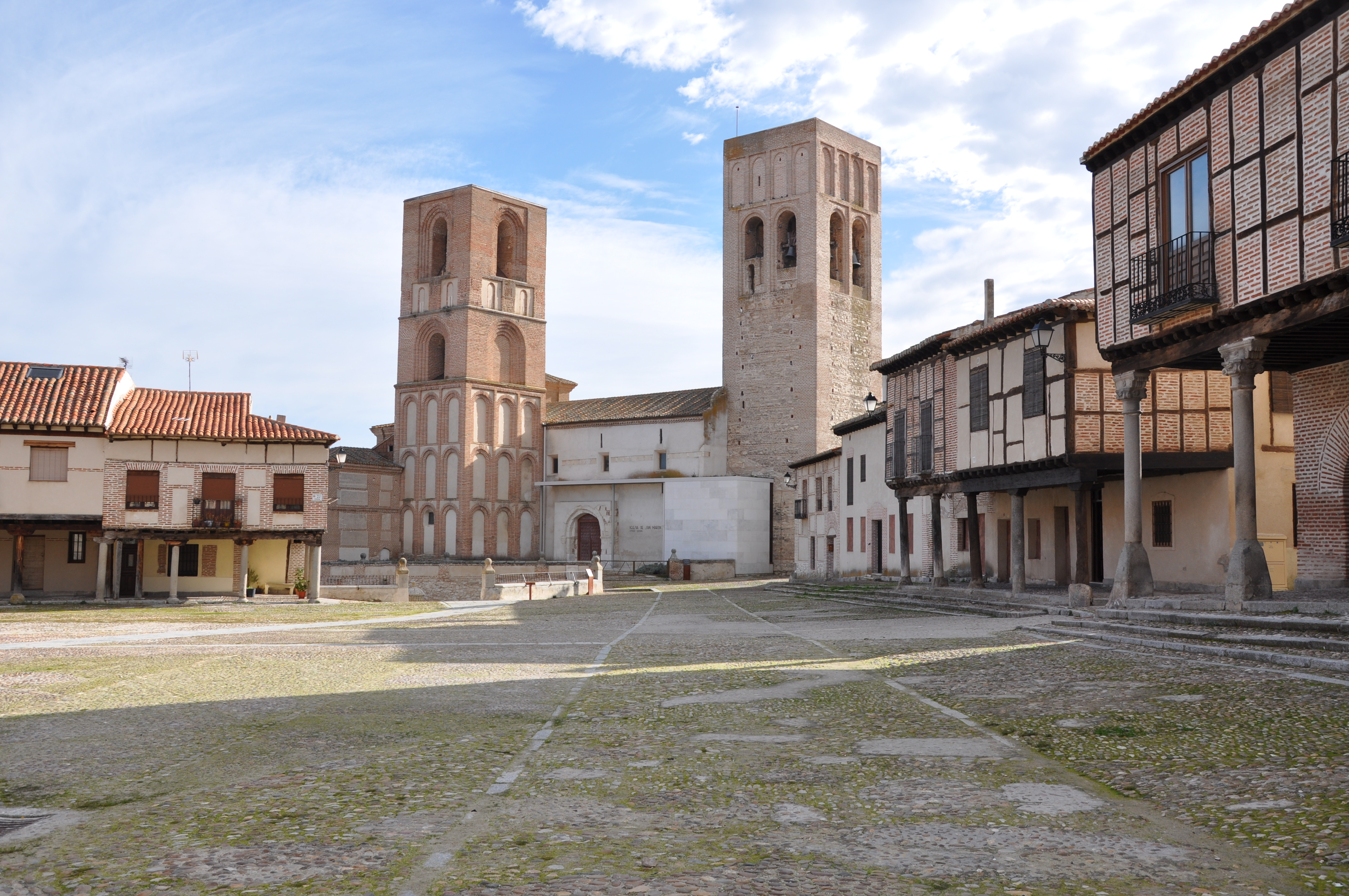
Arévalo's main square was closed for 5 days due to the shooting of the film.

The screenplay was penned by David Hebrero alongside Javier Kirán, whilst Ona Isart worked as a cinematographer. The film is a Nostalgia Shop Films production. It was shot in locations of the Madrid region and the province of Ávila, including Arévalo and Las Rozas.

== Release ==
The film had its world premiere on 16 October 2021 at the 54th Sitges Film Festival. Its festival run also included the Bilbao-based FANT Festival and the London-based Arrow FrightFest. It was selected in the 2022 Fantastic Fest's film slate for its North-American premiere. Filmin will release the film in Spain on 2 June 2023 whilst Drafthouse Films acquired US rights to the film.

== Reception ==
Rubén Romero Santos of Cinemanía rated the film 3 out of 5 stars, deeming it to be a "total and joyful nonsense", close to camp aesthetics, turning out to be "a refreshing surprise that overturns prejudices and stereotypes".

== See also ==
- List of Spanish films of 2023
