= The Lame Pigeon =

1995 film by Jaime de Armiñán

- Theatrical release poster
- Spanish: El palomo cojo
- Directed by: Jaime de Armiñán
- Screenplay by: Jaime de Armiñán
- Based on: El palomo cojo by Eduardo Mendicutti
- Produced by: Luis Méndez
- Starring: María Barranco; Francisco Rabal; Carmen Maura; Miguel Ángel Muñoz
- Cinematography: Fernando Arribas
- Edited by: José Luis Matesanz
- Music by: Jesús Yanes
- Production company: Lotus Films
- Release date: 6 October 1995
- Running time: 114 minutes
- Country: Spain
- Language: Spanish

The Lame Pigeon (Spanish: El palomo cojo) is a 1995 Spanish drama film written and directed by Jaime de Armiñán, based on the 1991 novel by Eduardo Mendicutti, based on his childhood. It stars María Barranco, Francisco Rabal, Carmen Maura and a young Miguel Ángel Muñoz, in his feature film debut. It is a coming of age story of a ten-year-old boy sent to the house of his maternal grandparents, which is full of eccentric characters. The boy has to deal with the realization of his sexual identity. The title makes reference to the analogy of a lame pigeon with homosexuality. The film is an exploration of class and sexual identity in Andalusia, Spain, in the 1950s.

== Plot ==
In 1958, Felipe, a ten-year-old boy, is sent by his mother to spend the summer with his maternal relatives in Sanlúcar de Barrameda while he recuperates his frail health. His grandparents are wealthy and live in a vast residence that serves as the center that reunites a large family and many visitors. The house is dominated by the frequent howls of the boy's ancient great-grandmother, who is senile and is taken care of by Adoración, a strict nurse, who endures the old woman's endlessly repeated recollection of the four bandoleros who killed each other for her love.

Pampered on his arrival by the women in the house, Felipe is ordered to stay in bed by the family's doctor. He is given the bedroom of his absent uncle Ramón and spends his time reading Little Women. Felipe quickly forms a close friendship with Mari, the talkative and meddlesome maid. She keeps four lovers on a string, but refuses to let go of her virginity. An expert on men's matters, Mari shamelessly flirts with the boy even when she has the impression that he might be gay. In secrecy, she shows Felipe some items that she has found in uncle Ramón's bedroom: a suggestive photograph of Ramón in swimming wear revealing his anatomy and a postcard from 1936 signed by someone named Federico that depicts a dog looking at a dove with what Mari describes as a lovesick face. The message in the postcard and its image imply that there was a homoerotic relationship between Ramón and Federico. Felipe points out that the picture was taken in the terrace of the bedroom and both Mari and the boy are fascinated by Ramón's revealing attire in the photograph.

Felipe also befriends Uncle Ricardo, the eccentric brother of the boy's grandfather, who trains pigeons and dreams of finding a treasure at sea with his boat. Felipe tells him of Mari's belief that lame doves are queers, then asks Ricardo if he might be queer. Although Ricardo denies it, he does not do so when the boy ask the same question regarding uncle Ramón, evasively responding that he no longer remembers.

Peace in the house is frequently disturbed by many visitors like Reglita, a mature spinster, and there is general commotion with the arrival of Felipe's cosmopolitan Aunt Victoria, a singer who sweeps into town with Luigi, her muscle-bound Italian "secretary" in tow. A liberal free thinker who has travelled Europe extensively, Victoria scandalizes Felipe's conservative grandmother with her recitation of erotic and anti-Franco poetry that makes the neighbors blush but fascinates Reglita. With her free way of living and her expertise on men, Victoria draws the attention of Mari who asks her about her lovers and Victoria shows her a valuable ring that one of them gave her.

The uncertainty of Felipe's blossoming sexuality is subjected to further confusion with the surprising arrival of the charismatic communist Uncle Ramón, who takes back possession of his bedroom. Both Felipe and Mari are fascinated by him. Felipe asks Ramón which tastes better, a man, a lady, or a young gal, to which the worldly Uncle Ramón responds, "Ladies and young gals taste great, and I once met a man who tasted like Manchego cheese." Felipe immediately identifies this man as Federico. The boy then compliments his uncle on having gorgeous eyes.

There is new commotion in the house with the elopement of Luigi with one of Mari's lovers, stealing Victoria's valuable ring, and with the death of Felipe's senile great grandmother. Mari tells Felipe that he can spy from his bedroom and see Uncle Ramón naked at night, but instead she shows up dancing naked by his window and with Victoria's ring in her hand. The next day Felipe accuses Mari of stealing the ring and, when Felipe shows where she has hidden it, the grandfather fires her. Felipe goes to Mari's room before her departure to reconcile. To Felipe's sadness Uncle Ramón has left as suddenly as he arrived. Victoria, Felipe and Uncle Ricardo set out to sea on a treasure seeking adventure.

== Cast ==
- María Barranco as Mari
- Francisco Rabal as Uncle Ricardo
- Carmen Maura as Aunt Victoria
- Miguel Ángel Muñoz as Felipe
- Joaquin Kremel as Uncle Ramón
- Ana Torrent as Adoración
- Maria Galiana as Grandmother
- Amparo Baró as Reglita
- Tomás Zori as Great-grand mother
- Valeriano Andres as Grandfather
- Maria Massip as Aunt Blanca
- Asunción Balaguer as Tata Caridad
- Ofelia Angelica as Esther
- Paolo Stella as Luigi

== Production ==
El Palomo cojo, Jaime de Armiñán's fourteenth feature film, is based on the semiautobiographical novel of the same title written by Eduardo Mendicutti published in 1991. The film was shot in Mendicutti's hometown of Sanlúcar de Barrameda and many of the interiors were filmed in the house that belonged to the author's grandparents.

The film is a period piece set in the 1950s, portraying the region of Andalucia at that time. The grandfather asks if President Eisenhower is going to visit Spain. Mendicutti commented that "Armiñán changed things in the screen version, since my novel is narrated in the first person and is based more on sensations than on actions". The film is notable for its large cast of some of Spain's best regarded actors. The role of uncle Ricardo was expanded from what it was on the book, to take advantage of the acting skills of veteran actor Francisco Rabal who went on to play a similar role on Carlos Saura's film Pajarico. Particularly noteworthy is the performance of María Barranco as the talkative and foul mouthed maid. She speaks with her strong Andalusian accent.

Miguel Ángel Muñoz said the first kiss he gave on the mouth at the age of ten was not to a girl but it was to a woman, actress María Barranco in a scene of this film. "The difficult thing was not so much making a film at ten years old, but talking about sexuality to a ten-year-old, which is what this film was about. There was a moment when I had to touch María Barranco's breasts in a scene and I thought it was something very strong," Muñoz recalled.

== Accolades ==
Year	Award	Category	Nominee(s)	Result	Ref.
1996	10th Goya Awards	Best Adapted Screenplay	Jaime de Armiñán	Nominated	
