= Isabel (TV series) =

- Genre: Historical drama
- Directed by: Jordi Frades
- Starring: Michelle Jenner; Rodolfo Sancho
- Theme music composer: Federico Jusid
- Country of origin: Spain
- Original language: Spanish
- No. of seasons: 3
- No. of episodes: 39

Production
- Executive producers: Jaume Banacolocha; Joan Bas
- Producer: Nicolás Romero
- Running time: 70 minutes
- Production companies: Televisión Española; Diagonal TV

Original release
- Network: La 1
- Release: 10 September 2012 – 1 December 2014

Related
- La corona partida

Isabel is a Spanish historical fiction television series, directed by Jordi Frades and produced by Diagonal TV for Televisión Española. The series is based upon the reign of Queen Isabella I of Castile. It was broadcast on La 1 of Televisión Española from 2012 to 2014.

== Synopsis ==
This series is a biography about Isabel, Queen of Castile. The first season chronicles the period between 1461 and 1474: from the end of her childhood to her marriage with Fernando of Aragon and her difficult arrival to the Crown.

The second season chronicles the period between 1474 and 1492: from her crowning to the conquest of Granada and the beginning of the journey of Christopher Columbus.

The third season covers the marriages of Juana with Philip and Juan with Margarita, the subsequent deaths of Isabella's children Juan and Isabel as well as the latter's son Miguel along with the marriages of Maria and Catalina.

== Cast ==
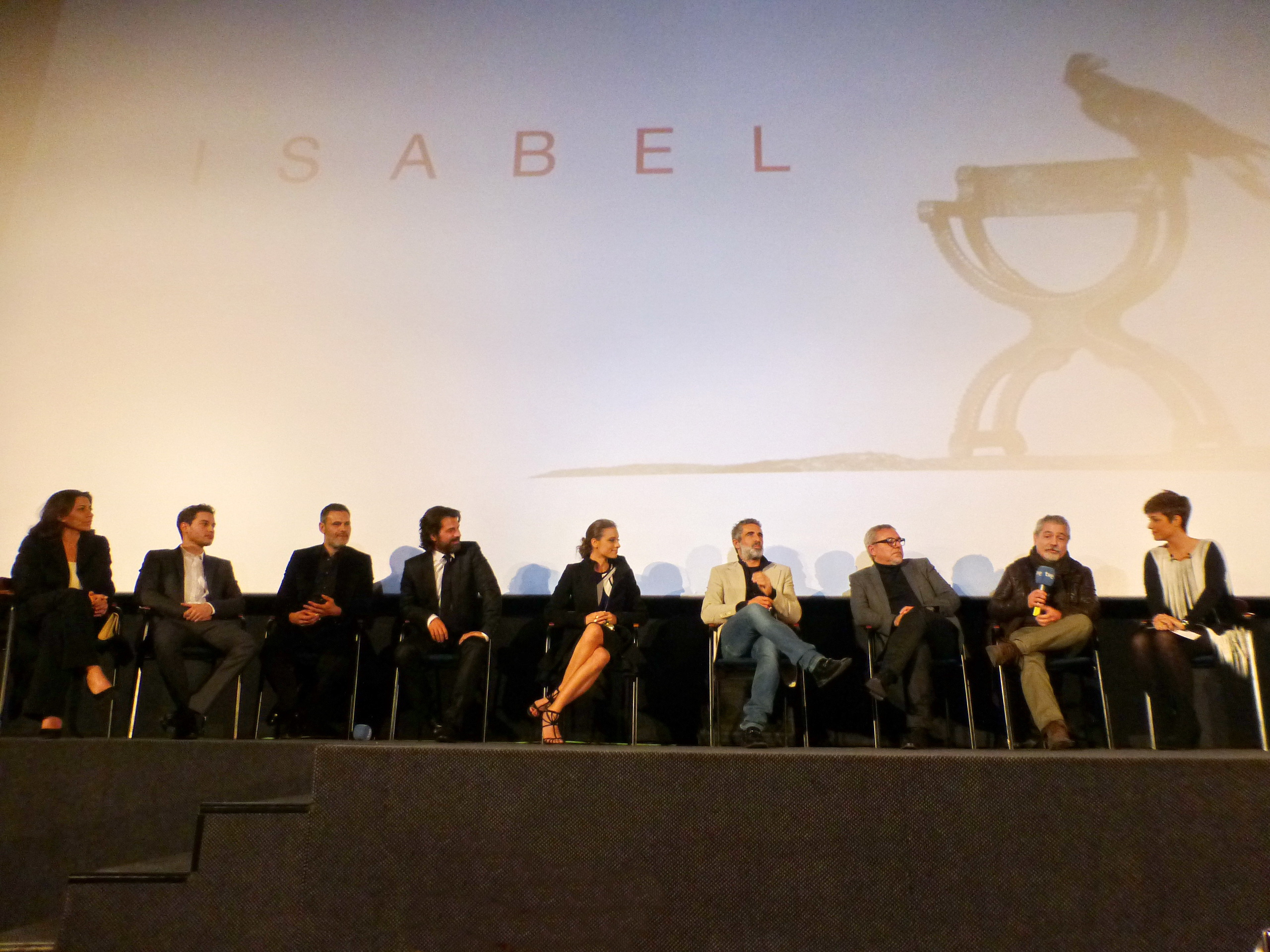
A panel featuring cast members of season 2.

- Michelle Jenner as Isabel
- Rodolfo Sancho as Fernando
- Pablo Derqui as King Enrique
- Bárbara Lennie as Juana of Avis
- Ginés García Millán as Juan Pacheco
- Pedro Casablanc as Alfonso Carrillo de Acuña
- Ramon Madaula as Gonzalo Chacón
- Pere Ponce as Gutierre de Cárdenas
- Clara Sanchis as Isabel's mother
- Víctor Elías as Infante Alfonso
- Sergio Peris-Mencheta as Gonzalo Fernández de Córdoba
- William Miller as Beltrán de la Cueva
- Ainhoa Santamaría as Beatriz de Bobadilla
- Jordi Díaz as Andrés Cabrera
- Juan Meseguer as Diego Hurtado de Mendoza
- Carmen Lozano as Juana la Beltraneja
- Jordi Banacolocha as King Juan
- Daniel Albaladejo as King Afonso
- César Vea as Pedro Girón
- Mónica Vic as Clara Chacón
- Estrella Zapatero as María Portocarrero
- Mar del Hoyo as Mencía de Mendoza y Luna
- Andrés Herrera as Pedro González de Mendoza
- Nacho López as Alonso de Palencia
- Arturo Querejeta as Alfonso de Fonseca
- Ernesto Arias as Pedro de Peralta y Ezpeleta
- Fernando Sansegundo as Giacopo Antonio Venier
- Javier Rey as Diego Pacheco
- Jorge Bosch as Pope Alexander VI
- Julio Manrique as Christopher Columbus
- Lydia Miranda as Beatriz Galindo
- Álex Martínez as Boabdil
- Fernando Soto as Rodrigo Ponce de León, Marquis of Cádiz
- Alicia Borrachero as Aixa
- Javier Mora as El Zagal
- Nuria Gallardo as Beatriz de Braganza
- Roberto Enríquez as Muley Hacén
- Nani Jiménez as Isabel de Solís / Zoraya
- Irene Escolar as Juana of Castile
- Raúl Merida as Philip of Habsburg
- Hovik Keuchkerian as Francisco Ramírez de Madrid
- Eusebio Poncela as Cardinal Cisneros
- Adrián Lamana as Juan, Prince of Asturias
- Úrsula Corberó as Margarita of Habsburg
- Nacho Aldeguer as Cesare Borgia
- Iván Hermés as King Manuel
- Francesc Garrido as Juan Rodríguez de Fonseca
- Pablo Castañón as Bartholomew Columbus
- Fernando Guillén Cuervo as Gutierre Gómez de Fuensalida
- Héctor Carballo as King Charles
- María Cantuel as Infanta Isabel
- Marta Belmonte as Anne of Brittany
- José Pedro Carrión as Luis de Tremoille
- Jonás Berami as Diego Columbus
- Abel Folk as Francisco de Busleyden
- Susana Abaitua as Infanta María
- Natalia Rodríguez Arroyo as Infanta Catalina

== Episodes and ratings ==
=== Season 1 (2012) ===
No. overall	No. in season	Title	Original release date	Viewers (share)
1	1	"Isabel, la reina (Isabel, the Queen)"	10 September 2012	3,529,000 (20.1%)
2	2	"Campanas de boda (Wedding Bells)"	17 September 2012	3,736,000 (20.2%)
3	3	"La negociación (Negotiation)"	24 September 2012	3,881,000 (20.3%)
4	4	"Tragedia en la corte (Tragedy in the Court)"	1 October 2012	3,361,000 (16.1%)
5	5	"El pacto de Guisando (The Pact of Guisando)"	8 October 2012	3,378,000 (16.9%)
6	6	"La figura del rey (The King's Figure)"	15 October 2012	3,801,000 (18.3%)
7	7	"La reina puesta (The Queen in position)"	22 October 2012	3,952,000 (18.9%)
8	8	"Nueva guerra (New war)"	29 October 2012	4,278,000 (20.7%)
9	9	"Boda real (Royal Wedding)"	5 November 2012	4,626,000 (22%)
10	10	"Nacimiento (Birth)"	12 November 2012	4,503,000 (21.3%)
11	11	"El principio del fin (Principle of the end)"	19 November 2012	4,299,000 (20.4%)
12	12	"Elecciones (Elections)"	26 November 2012	4,342,000 (20.3%)
13	13	"La nueva reina (The New Queen)"	3 December 2012	4,651,000 (22.6%)

=== Season 2 (2013) ===
No. overall	No. in season	Title	Original release date	Viewers (share)
14	1	"Desencuentros (Disagreements)"	9 September 2013	3,561,000 (19.2%)
15	2	"Lazos (Knots)"	16 September 2013	3,508,000 (18.3%)
16	3	"La paz para Castilla (Peace for Castille)"	23 September 2013	3,632,000 (18.9%)
17	4	"Lealtad y deber (Loyalty and Duty)"	30 September 2013	3,743,000 (19.1%)
18	5	"El poder de la reina (The Power of the Queen)"	7 October 2013	3,758,000 (19.5%)
19	6	"Sultán (Sultan)"	14 October 2013	3,710,000 (18.5%)
20	7	"Tiempos de Inquisición (Time of Inquisition)"	21 October 2013	3,023,000 (14,8%)
21	8	"Herederos de sangre (Inheritors of Blood)"	28 October 2013	2,987,000 (14,6%)
22	9	"Lo más liviano (The most fickle)"	4 November 2013	2,997 000 (14,6%)
23	10	"Pacta con el diablo (Deal with the devil)"	11 November 2013	3,042 000 (14,8%)
24	11	"Abolengo (Ancestry)"	18 November 2013	3,254 000 (15,9%)
25	12	"El último reino en Granada (The Last Kingdom in Granada)"	25 November 2013	2,946,000 (13.9%)
26	13	"Lo que no supiste defender como hombre (What you did not know how to defend as a man)"	2 December 2013	3,398,000 (16.3%)

=== Season 3 (2014) ===
No. overall	No. in season	Title	Original release date	Viewers (share)
27	1	"La fragilidad del reino (Fragility of the kingdom)"	8 September 2014	2,937,000 (17.6%)
28	2	"Gobernar con mano dura (Ruling with an iron fist)"	15 September 2014	2,767,000 (15.5%)
29	3	"Nacidos para gobernar (Born to rule)"	22 September 2014	2,898,000 (15.4%)
30	4	"Atracción fatal (Fatal attraction)"	29 September 2014	2,950,000 (15.9%)
31	5	"El drama llega a la corte (Drama arrives at the court)"	6 October 2014	2,994,000 (15.8%)
32	6	"Reina de toda la península (Queen of the Whole Peninsula)"	13 October 2014	3,068,000 (15.0%)
33	7	"Muere la Princesa de Asturias (The Princess of Asturias dies)"	20 October 2014	3,178,000 (16.4%)
34	8	"A Isabel le supera la tragedia (Isabella overcomes the tragedy)"	27 October 2014	3,096,000 (16.6%)
35	9	"Felipe y Juana llegan a sus reinos (Philip and Joanna arrive at their kingdoms)"	3 November 2014	3,282,000 (16.5%)
36	10	"Isabel y Fernando o Juana y Felipe (Isabella and Ferdinand or Philip and Joanna)"	10 November 2014	3,264,000 (16.2%)
37	11	"Le llamaban Juana la Loca (They called her Joanna the Mad)"	17 November 2014	3,213,000 (16.2%)
38	12	"¿Conservarán el legado de Isabel? (Will they preserve Isabella's legacy?)"	24 November 2014	3,347,000 (16.8%)
39	13	"La muerte de Isabel (Isabella's death)"	1 December 2014	3,835,000 (19.4%)

== Episode Summaries ==
History before the series begins. Isabella is born on April 22, 1451, in a modest palace in the small town of Madrigal de las Altas Torres, on the windswept Castilian plain. Her mother, Isabel of Portugal (1428-1496) is the second wife of King Juan II of Spain. The palace where she was born was later incorporated into a convent (still functioning); the room where she was born can still be seen on the tour of the palace given by the nuns. Isabella’s father, Juan II, dies on July 22, 1454, shortly after Isabella’s brother Alfonso (1453-1468) is born. The throne passes to Isabella’s half-brother, Enrique IV (1425-1474). Mother and two children are then sent to a crumbling palace in the town of Arévalo, not far from Madrigal, on a very limited pension, where Isabella lived from 1454 to 1462. The castle is still there and can be visited, though much changed from Isabella’s time. Little is known of these years, because nobody thought she would be important, certainly not a great ruler and perhaps the greatest woman ruler in history. Though poor, she was able to learn to ride horses (which many aristocratic women did not), and the fields around the castle were perfectly suited for it. Among her tutors, sent from Ávila, was Gonzalo Chacón (1429-1507), who became her lifelong advisor. She would have grown up speaking Portuguese (her mother was Portuguese) and Spanish. At this time she also befriended Beatriz de Bobadilla (1440-1511), daughter of the governor of Arévalo castle and her lifelong friend. Beatriz, a dark-haired fiery woman, was in some ways the opposite of, or perhaps a complement to Isabella, who had a strawberry blonde complexion, probably from her English grandmother, Catherine of Lancaster (1373-1418). Here the series picks up.

Comment on the Blu-Ray DVDs. For the Blu-Ray version (recommended), the box is labeled Region B, which is Europe. However, it appears that it was actually produced region-free, as it plays on US players (Region A). I purchased my set in Spain, but it can be purchased in the US through Amazon. There are English subtitled versions of some of the episodes on the Internet, but of low resolution and with lots of ads.

Series 1 (1461-1474)

Episode 1. “Isabel the Queen” (1461-1464). Flash forward to coronation on Sunday, December 13, 1474. Back to about 1461 when a child at Arévalo. Then call to court about 1462, up to celebration of her majority estimated at 1464. Includes beginning of attempted coup in 1464 against King Henry by Pacheco and Archbishop of Toledo Alfonso Carillo (1410-1482). Also includes birth of Juana la Beltraneja (1462-1530). Isabella is godmother to Juana (March 1464).

Episode 2. “Wedding Bells” (1464-1465). Revolt against King Henry by Juan Pacheco, Marques de Villena (1419-1474), Archbishop of Toledo Alfonso Carillo (1410-1482), and others. Alfonso to be betrothed to little Juana and to be heir to throne (1464), and Isabella to be given to king of Portugal (agreement between Juana wife of Henry and her brother, king of Portugal), which she publicly refuses (April, 1464). Gonzalo of Córdoba (1453-1515) becomes bodyguard of Alfonso (later Gonzalo becomes one of the greatest generals in history). Henry’s friend and possibly lover Beltrán de la Cueva (1443-1492) is sent away as part of negotiations with rebels, but later called back. Mock dethroning of Henry in Avila (June 6, 1465). Alfonso (age 12 or 13) is hoodwinked by the rebels who pretend that he is the real king. Pacheco hatches plot to kidnap Henry and kill Beltrán, but plot is discovered and foiled. Isabella settled in her own household in Segovia (1465).

Episode 3. “Negotiation” (1466) The civil war and the effort to marry Isabella to Don Pedro Girón Pacheco (1423-1466), brother of Juan Pacheco. Beatriz’ father wants her to marry Andrés Cabrera (1430-1511), the keeper of the treasury and a high official to Enrique, later Isabella’s friend and counselor. The civil war faction is headed by Pacheco and Carillo. To resolve the civil war, Enrique’s councilors hatch a scheme to have Isabella (age 15) married to Don Girón, arguably the worst person in Spain at the time, completely immoral and corrupt, though a good fighter (March, 1466). Isabella is told and has no way out. Girón is on his way to marry her. She fasts and prays a day and a night, saying “Let him die, or let me die.” Famously, Beatriz swears to kill him herself. On his journey, there was a sign: a huge flock of storks flies overhead and blots out the sun (storks don’t fly in flocks), taken as a bad omen. He dies shortly thereafter on the way (this is in the historical record). In the movie (not confirmed in the historical record), Girón is done in by the brother of a woman that he raped and who died. This sets the stage for resumption of the civil war. Alfonso wants to fight in the war but has no skills.

Episode 4. “Tragedy in the Court” (1467-1468). Battle of Olmeda and death of Alfonso. Alfonso fails to fight at the important [Second] Battle of Olmeda (20 August 1467). The battle is a draw, or at least Enrique will not declare victory. The civil war continues. Alfonso is still treated as king by the rebels, and shows some noble character despite his failure on the battlefield. Enrique meanwhile insists on negotiation, and part of the deal forces him to go back on his word to his wife that they and little Juana will be together. She is sent off to the estate of Archbishop Fonseca of Seville, Juana is kept separately. Isabella and Alfonso are back with their mother for a short while. Later another battle is brewing for Toledo, and Alfonso is there with Isabella. He eats trout for dinner and by the next morning is extremely ill, dying soon thereafter (July, 1468). The movie intimates that Pacheco poisoned him, though this is not in the historical record.

Episode 5. “The Pact of Guisando” (1468). Events leading to the Pact of Toros de Guisando. Juana becomes pregnant by her paramour in Fonseca’s castle, who, when discovered, represents an insoluble problem for Henry as everyone knew that he could not be the father. This leads to him renouncing little Juana as heir, and agreeing to proclaim Isabella as the real heir. Isabella agrees with Enrique that there has been too much bloodshed in the civil wars. They meet at Toros de Guisando on September 19, 1468 to publicly proclaim the agreement (the place is still there with the four toros and can be visited). Isabella agrees to honor Enrique and not try to assume the throne as long as he is alive. The papal legate tells everyone that any prior declarations are nullified. The idea is for Castille to have peace.

Episode 6 “The King’s Figure”. (1468). Civil war continues. Enrique refuses to abide by treaties and pacts that he has signed, always under the influence of the last person to talk to him. Signs pact with Isabella declaring her Princess of Asturias (meaning next in line for throne, 1468), after being told that she knows about Juana’s illegitimate child and fact that bull allowing Enrique to marry Juana is invalid. Attempts made to marry Isabella to King of Portugal again, and to brother of King of France. Pacheco tries to negotiate his daughter’s marriage to Ferdinand, who makes his first appearance (together with mistress Aldonza Roig de Iborra (1454-1513), with whom he had a boy, Alonso de Aragon, (1469-1520)). Enrique does not bring up the agreement with Isabella to the Cortes, which accepts his recommendation that she marry the King of Portugal, betraying her again. Pacheco tricks Chacon and Carreras into coming to Segovia, throws them into prison, threatens Isabella with lifetime incarceration unless she signs onto marriage contract. Isabella refuses, rescued by Gonzalo de Córdoba and Carillo, whose forces kill most of Pacheco’s raiding party.

Episode 7. “The Queen in Position”. (1469). Pacheco has promised his daughter that she will marry Fernando. Enrique wants Isabella to marry the Duque de Guyenne, brother of the king of France. Carillo and Chacon convince her that the only choice she has is the Duque or Ferdinand, prince of Aragon. Cardenas is dispatched by Isabella to meet both Fernando and the Duque and tell her about them. Since the Duque is crippled and bent over, he is able to convince Isabella to marry Ferdinand. She has to promise Enrique that she’ll marry the Duque, though she knows it is a lie. She is kept under watch in Ocoña, but the marriage preparations with Ferdinand continue, for the wedding to be held in Valladolid. The legate from France comes and realizes that she has no intention of marrying the Duque. Carillo tells Isabella that there is a Bull that authorizes Fernando to marry in the family (Isabella and Fernando are second cousins, but it was never signed by the Pope, though he doesn’t tell her that. After some stormy negotiations, all is set, but Fernando has to travel in secret to Valladolid for the wedding. Isabella is rescued by Gonzalo and taken off to Valladolid, much to the chagrin of Pacheco, who now realizes that he has been betrayed and that his daughter won’t be marrying Fernando.

Episode 8. “New War”. (1469). Events leading to the first in-person meeting of Isabella and Ferdinand. Enrique, under the influence of Pacheco, wants to prevent the marriage of Ferdinand and Isabella, and tries various means to thwart it, including arresting her. The borders of Castile are blocked so that Ferdinand could be captured if he tried to enter. He accepts that challenge and sets out meet up with her in Valladolid. On October 12, Isabella writes Enrique a letter informing him of her intention to marry Ferdinand, reminding him of all the agreements that had been made, going back to Guisando. Enrique consoles himself with the conviction that the marriage cannot take place because there is no papal Bull exempting the second cousins from the prohibition to marry. The Bull exists but was never signed, and the pope at the time (Paul II) has been essentially bribed by Enrique with money to fight against the Moslems so he refuses to sign it, in the video. Pacheco makes a last-ditch effort to change sides, but is rebuffed by Archbishop Carillo, his uncle.

Episode 9. “Royal Wedding” (1469). Covers the desperate attempts by Pacheco and Enrique to derail the marriage of Isabella and Ferdinand, and their equally great efforts to make sure that it happens. Includes a version of Ferdinand’s secretive trip to meet Isabella for the wedding in Valladolid. They meet for the first time on October 14. Isabella is portrayed as very nervous about getting married. There is a scene where the now-engaged couple is introduced to a small room of nobles and officials. Carillo wants to ensure that he will have the ability to call the shots in the new regime. The story also covers the machinations about the Papal Bull needed because of the consanguinity of the couple (second cousins through King Juan I, 1358-1390, of the house of Trastámara). The story told by the legate, Bishop Veneris, is most likely correct: the Pope privately gave the dispensation, but couldn’t publicly proclaim it. The wedding takes place on October 19, in Valladolid, officiated by Archbishop Carillo. Immediately Pacheco starts scheming to make little Juana the heir to the throne. Beatriz has her first child, a son.

Episode 10. “Birth” (1470). A dark time for Isabella and Ferdinand, due to lack of money and scheming by Pacheco and Enrique to deprive them of any resources and keep them and their children out of the line of succession. Isabella gives birth to her first child, Isabel (1470-1498). A difficult harvest and severe winter lead to deprivation for the common people. Pacheco and Enrique engineer a marriage for little Juana to the Duque de Guyenne, on the theory that he will be the next king of France. The ceremony is a betrothal, and the real wedding is supposed to take place when Juana (now about 8) comes of age. Standing in for the Duque is one of his elder courtiers. Henry publishes a letter disavowing the pact of Guisando, condemning Isabella for marrying against his will, and proclaiming little Juana as legitimate heiress to the throne. Friction develops between Carillo and the couple, but Carillo comes through again, as Isabella, Ferdinand, and their attendants are forced to flee their castle and take refuge with one of Carillo’s friends. Pacheco sends troops to arrest the couple and boot them out of Castile, but they have already escaped.

Episode 11. “The beginning of the end” (1471). Dark times continue. Enrique and Pacheco learn that the King’s wife has given birth to a son, so the Duque is no longer heir to the throne. Everyone but Enrique now realizes the malevolence of Pacheco, who keeps hatching schemes. But Enrique keeps giving him the green light. He attempts to capture Ferdinand and Isabella, but is thwarted because they leave for another place. He tries to attack that, but his forces are defeated by a smaller force under command of Gonzalo. Aragon is out of money, so can’t support Ferdinand and Isabella. Ferdinand is able to get the support of some groups, including Basques. Things appear to be turning around.

Episode 12. “Choices” (1471-1472). Pope Sixtus IV elected (9 August 1471). Dispatches Cardinal Borja (in English, Borgia, later Pope Alexander VI, 1431-1503), a native of Valencia, to Spain to size up the situation there, who also carries the Papal Bull allowing the marriage of Ferdinand and Isabella. He quickly discerns what is happening. Part of his task is to decide who will be the next Cardinal of Spain. Fernando’s father tells him to support the Mendoza family candidate, Pedro González de Mendoza (1428-1495) as he is trustworthy and looks to the future. When the Mendozas learn of Ferdinand’s support for their candidate, their attitude toward Ferdinand and Isabella changes. Pacheco continues to lose ground, but still has the confidence of Enrique. Isabella convinces Borja that she will be a fine ruler. Carillo is upset that he isn’t chosen as the Cardinal.

Episode 13. “The New Queen” (1473-1474). Support for Mendoza cardinal pays off in better relations with Enrique and Mendozas. Pacheco grooms his son Diego Pacheco (1456-1529) to take over from him. Enrique mourns. No new succession agreement signed. Reunion of Isabella with Enrique. Pacheco losing influence and tries to kidnap or kill Isabella, but thwarted. Pacheco tries to get Queen Juana to join in revolt against Enrique, but fails. Marriage problems between Isabella and Ferdinand. Carillo is angry and starts to side with Queen Juana to get her daughter on the throne. Enrique dies early in morning of Sunday, 13 December 1474. Isabella crowned the same day in Segovia, against advice of Mendozas who want to call a council of nobles. Ferdinand is angry that she is crowned but he isn’t present and crowned as well.

Series 2 (1474-1492)

Episode 14. “Disagreements” (1474-1475). Opens with flashforward to 1492 and the surrender of Granada. Then back to 1474. Ferdinand is extremely upset with Isabella over her coronation when he was not there His father asks Carillo to help him, but Carillo still wants power so his advice is self-serving. Isabella also asks him for help, but she gets better advice from Cardinal Mendoza. Meanwhile, Carillo is involved with Pacheco’s son Diego, who is trying to get the King of Portugal to invade Spain and put la Beltraneja on the throne. The King isn’t too keen on the idea, but eventually gets talked into it. Ferdinand and Isabella finally reconcile with a new agreement about how the power is going to be shared (Concord of Segovia, 15 January 1475). About this time they realize Carillo’s double dealing. The King of Portugal decides to invade.

Episode 15. “Knots”. (1475). Things go downhill for Ferdinand and Isabella. The King of Portugal agrees to marry little Juana la Beltraneja (Palencia, 29 May 1475), and start a war with Castile. Ferdinand and Isabella have few soldiers. Isabella rides to Leon and convinces the alcalde there to go to her side. Isabella is pregnant with a boy but miscarries (31 May 1475). She gets a new confessor and spiritual advisor, Fray Hernando de Talavera (1430-1507), a Hieronymite monk, who is very strict with her but very honest, respected for his humility, integrity, and faith-driven counsel. Isabella’s attempt at reconciliation with Carillo fails. Battle lines are formed at Toro, and Ferdinand challenges Portuguese king to one-on-one combat to decide the battle. He sets unacceptable conditions, and Ferdinand decides he does not have enough forces and pulls back to Segovia (22 July 1475). Queen Juana dies. Marriage problems persist because of the children of Ferdinand with his old mistress. Isabella angry at the retreat.

Episode 16. “Peace for Castile” (1475-1476). Things go badly for Ferdinand and Isabella at first. They have no money for soldiers, and are outnumbered. King Juan of Portugal continues his invasion, but does not seem fully committed to the idea. He tries to get more allies in Castile. Isabella goes to Leon and secures its support. Cabrera convinces the Jewish leaders to give money for the war. Later Fray Hernando does the same with the Church leaders. The siege of Burgos weakens the city. Isabella goes and the gates are opened to her. She secures its surrender, but has to deal with a difficult problem involving the Jewish quarter. She is counseled by Fray Hernando, who shows his wisdom. King Juan, not receiving expected support from France, and losing ground, decides to retreat to Portugal, despite having a numerically superior army. Peace returns to Castile.

Episode 17. “Loyalty and Duty” (1476). Isabella shows more queen-like character, with execution of criminals and those disloyal. She puts Cabrera and Beatriz in charge of Segovia, but a revolt in Segovia against her handpicked alcalde (mayor) creates a crisis involving her daughter Isabel, which she is able to resolve, but it casts a shadow over her relationship with Cabrera and Beatriz. She puts Chacon in charge of Segovia. In the movie his wife dies. He wants to retire, but she tells him that she needs him. Efforts to woo Carillo fail, but Pacheco’s son Diego does capitulate. Juana la Beltraneja starts scheming, even including a divorce from King Alfonso (who is in France on a fruitless mission to get support) so that she can with his son become the queen of Castile.

Episode 18. “The Power of the Queen” (1477). Isabella and Ferdinand continue to consolidate their power. Isabella rapidly grows into her new position. She rejects the offer of an African slave, freeing him. The monarchs start to deal with problems in Extremadura and Seville. Diego Pacheco is put in charge of subduing the towns of Extremadura. Gonzalo de Cordoba resumes his service. Despite warnings, she enters Seville, at that time a hotbed of lawlessness and intrigue. She subdues it; the Duke of Medina Sidonia agrees to be loyal, and his enemies are routed. Muslim raiders from Granada capture the daughter of a man from Seville, (Isabel de Solis, 1471-c. 1510). [The account in the video of her life is largely accurate; some accounts on the Internet have her as the mother of Boabdil, which is incorrect.] Isabella tries to rescue her. On October 3, 1477, she and Fernando sail in a galley from San Locar da Barramda, where they could see the Atlantic. The problem of the Jews and the Judaizers continues to plague her and her realm. Isabella becomes pregnant with Juan (1478-1497).

Episode 19. “Sultan” (1478–79). Isabel de Solis ends up loving the Emir Muley Hassan, converting to Islam with the name Zoroya (or Zoraya) and becoming his favorite wife, to the consternation of his other wife, Aixa la Horra, mother of Boabdil, who thereafter conspires to ensure that Boabdil will inherit the throne. The Emir decides to make his son from Isabel de Solis the heir to the throne since he doesn’t think much of Boabdil. Isabella gives birth to Juan (30 June 1478). King Alfonso V of Portugal (1432-1481) is stuck in France trying to gain support from Louis XI, with the French in no hurry to deal with him. While he is gone, his son Prince John assumed the throne. In reality the king abdicates and makes a pilgrimage to Jerusalem, but in the movie he just returns from France and resumes the throne. There is one final battle in the war with Isabella and Ferdinand, Abuera, 24 February 1479. A treaty is negotiated to end the conflict, the terms being that the Spanish will keep the Canary Islands but stay away from Guinea and the southern coast of Africa. Princess Isabel (9) was to marry crown prince Alfonso (4) when he was old enough, Juana la Beltraneja is required to enter a convent (in the movie she announces it as her choice). Beatriz, one of Isabella’s ladies, works to seduce Fernando, and attempts to make baby Juan sick by exposing him to a draft. Susanna, another of Isabella’s ladies, very sweet and devout, and a converso, learns that her family is attacked and her brother killed. Ferdinand’s father, king of Aragon, dies, and Ferdinand is crowned.

Episode 20. “Time of Inquisition” (1479–80). Isabella’s lady-in-waiting Beatriz, niece of her good friend Beatriz de Bobadilla, continues her affair with Fernando, which did happen in reality. Isabella’s daughter Juana la Loca (1479-1555) is born. Turmoil in Granada as the aging Emir (Muley Abul-Hassan) decides that his son Boabdil (Abu Abdallah, 1460-1583), by one of his wives (Zoroya) isn’t good enough, and decides to put the son of a new wife, as his heir. A seer he calls upon predicts that the boy will never rule and that Boabdil will surrender the city to the Christians. Ferdinand and Isabella initially resist starting the Inquisition, but after the Turkish attack on Otranto, Italy (not mentioned in the movie), they decide in September 1480 to institute it. The movie has Tomás de Torquemada (1420-1498) take over at the beginning, but he did not come until 1483. The converso Diego de Susan and his daughter Susanna were real, but Susanna was not in the court. In reality she had fallen in love with a Christian and feared for his safety, so betrayed her father, who had conspired with others and assembled a cache of weapons. The movie is also unhistorical in that the incident in it with Susanna’s father centers on anonymous denunciations, which at least in Torquemada’s time were not allowed. It also shows him presiding over the burning at the stake of a converso, but the Inquisition did not have that power. It does show Isabella concerned about the rights of the accused, and demanding fair treatment for them, and the problem of the conversos was serious, both for them and the state, so their predicament as shown in the movie is fairly accurate. Isabella’s friend Beatriz discovers the affair with her niece, and confronts Fernando. The niece meanwhile has been trying to sicken Isabella with a potion. She ends up married off to a nobleman who lives far away. Isabella is extremely angry.

Episode 21. “Inheritors of Blood”. (1481-1482). The Emir in Granada sends his troops off to capture Zahara (26 December 1491). But a rival faction (men in black) hates the Emir and plots against him with his mother. They later storm the palace and drive out the Emir and his ex-Christian wife and child. His son Boabdil becomes the new Emir. In reality this event doesn’t occur until after the Battle of Loja (1-4 July 1482). The Marquiz of Cadiz captures Alhama (February 27–28, 1482) and the Reconquista is back on. Isabella is still angry with Fernando about his affair with Beatriz, but eventually gets over it and even receives Aldonza and her two children by Fernando. Isabella and Fernando’s son Juan (1478-1497) is named heir to the throne of Aragon. Isabella has a difficult delivery, with twins, two girls, born 35 hours apart (June 29, 1482). Isabella nearly dies. The one girl survives and is named Maria (1482-1517, who becomes mother of a daughter Isabel who marries Charles V and gives birth to Phillip II.) Ferdinand has trouble with the nobles and peasants of Aragon. He puts together an army and picks up the Reconquista.

Episode 22. “The Most Fickle” (1482-1483). Against competent advice, Ferdinand decides to attack Loja (July, 1482). Only the end of the battle is shown, a rout for the Spanish. Archbishop Carillo is dying and Isabella visits him; he dies 1 July 1482. Another Spanish defeat occurred at Ajarquia NW of Malaga (March 19, 1483), with Moorish troops led by El Zagal, brother of the Emir. Boabdil decides to be a general and attacks Lucena, is defeated and captured by the Spanish (April 21, 1483). His father thereupon returns to Granada to resume control. He suffers a stroke and becomes blind. The marriage arrangement between Isabella’s daughter Isabel and the son of the Portuguese king is cancelled, and Isabel is reunited with her mother. Meanwhile the King is trying to confiscate all the wealth of the Braganza family. Another attack by the Moors near Zahara is repulsed with great losses to the Moors. The Marquis of Cadiz retakes the town of Zahara (October, 1483).

Episode 23. “Deal with the Devil”. (1484-1486). Reconquista and Moorish intrigues in the Alhambra. The battles seesaw back and forth, but the Spanish take the city of Ronda (25 June 1485), a major blow because El Zagal, the Emir’s brother, is preoccupied with palace matters. The Emir dies in September, 1485, and Isabel de Solis (Zoroya) decides to go back to her people with her children, who are shown as quite young, after indicating that she will marry the Emir’s brother, who has taken over. Ferdinand is busy with affairs in Aragon getting the nobles under control, and with the Reconquista battles. Columbus visits the Portuguese court but is rebuffed. Later he visits the Spanish court, though shown as if this happened in 1485 (he actually doesn’t come until January 20, 1486). However, his story there is pretty accurate, and he does convince Isabella of his vision for sailing west to reach East Asia. Isabella gives birth to her last child, Catalina, better known in the English-speaking world as Catherine of Aragon (16 December 1485). There is an attempt to have two Emirs in Granada, one Boabdil, the other the El Zagal. A group of conversos assassinate Peter Arbues, a chief inquisitor of Aragon (September, 1485).

Episode 24. “Ancestry”. (1487). Covers the battle for Malaga, concluded in August. Includes the civil war between Zagal and Boabdil. Narrates how Zagal, the jihadist, ultimate loses to Boabdil, the peacemaker. Ferdinand and Isabella are strict with the Muslim captives. The fall of Malaga means that little is left to the Muslims except Granada. The story is generally accurate, though some details are wrong. Isabella’s friend Beatriz is attacked by the assassin who mistakenly thinks she is Isabella, but she escapes in real life; in the movie she is badly injured. In reality, it is Don Alvaro who was struck. A subplot has Isabel de Solis (Zoroya) returning to seek mercy at the court, which Isabella grants. But the woman lies about her captivity, and is rejected by her father when he learns of her children by the Emir. Isabella is angry and bans her. This is not accurate; she remained in Granada and only later reconverted to Christianity. Her sons, however, were baptized. The situation of the Jews is still problematic.

Episode 25. “The Last Kingdom in Granada” (1491). The Muslims are down to their last kingdom, and realize that it is near its end. Boabdil makes a last-ditch appeal for support from Turks and Egyptians, but does not secure anything. Isabella’s daughter Isabel reluctantly marries Alfonso, heir to the Portuguese throne. Unexpectedly, they are very happy, but he dies in a tragic accident after only 8 months, crushing Isabel, who herself dies 7 years later. Prince Juan becomes very ill but recovers. Isabella and Ferdinand prepare for the last assault on Granada. The episode opens with a woman seeking a lost child in Toledo (actually La Guardia). This became the famous “Holy Child of La Guardia” incident, in which Jews and conversos were accused of kidnapping and killing the child on Good Friday, April 3, 1491. His body was never found. The movie gives an account that is not based on the actual events, though some Jews and conversos were later convicted and executed for the supposed murder. The incident inflamed passions and was a significant contributor to the decision to expel the Jews from Spain.

Episode 26. “What you did not know how to defend as a man” (1492). Events leading up to the surrender of Granada by Boabdil on January 2, 1492, including the Treaty of Granada, November 25, 1491. A short clip of the famous scene showing Boabdil giving the key to the city to Ferdinand and Isabella, concluding the 700 year Reconquista. Includes the famous quote from his mother. Also, events leading up to the expulsion of the Jews from Spain, March 31, 1492. Disagreements between Ferdinand and Isabella about the proposed war with France over disputed provinces, resolved peacefully. Columbus’ continued pleading before the court, and the final granting of his petition. The movie shows that leading scholars disputed Columbus’ claims that Asia could be reached by sailing west, due to the distance, which is correct but they didn’t know about North and South America. Disputes between Torquemada and Fray Talavera over what should happen in Granada after it is surrendered. Torquemada wants to become archbishop of Granada, but Isabella offers archbishopric to Fray Talavera. Columbus sails, finally leaving in July on his epoch voyage that concluded with the discovery of America on October 12.

Series 3 (1492-1504)

Episode 27. “Fragility of the kingdom” (1492-1493). Begins with flashforward to Isabella’s death in 1504. Negotiations with France over territory and Italy and the Papal States. Trouble with Isabella’s daughter Isabel, who is having trouble coping with the accidental death of her Portuguese husband after a few months of marriage. Isabella and Ferdinand travel to Barcelona for meetings with the French and for signing a treaty. Isabella leaves her confessor Hernando de Talavera and asks Cardinal Mendoza to recommend a new one, which he does: Francisco Jiménez de Cisneros (1436-1517). The movie is ahistorical in that expulsion of the Jews occurred after Cisneros becomes Isabella’s confessor in 1492, not before. Assassination attempt on Fernando in Barcelona, which he narrowly survives. Discussion of possible marriage of Catalina (Catherine of Aragon) with an English prince, though she is still a young child. Columbus returns, but negotiates with the Portuguese. Later he visits Ferdinand and Isabella in Barcelona, showing some of the gold and exotic things from his voyage, though as yet he does not know (nor does anyone else) that he did not reach Asia.

Episode 28. “Ruling with an iron fist” (1493–94). This episode comprises four subjects: the war with France over its invasion of Italy, the complicated negotiations between Spain and Portugal over rights to explore the new realms discovered by Columbus, the efforts of Isabella and Cisneros to reform the religious orders in Spain, and preparations for Columbus’ second voyage. The first two are actually related, as an early treaty ratified by the Pope gave Portugal exclusive rights to explore south of the Canary Islands, mainly the coast of Africa. This had to be abrogated for Columbus’ westward journeys, and the Pope’s need for protection from the French gave the Spanish leverage. The final agreement, as depicted in the episode, was the Treaty of Tordesillas (7 June 1494), in which Spain and Portugal agreed to fix the boundary between their domains at a great circle line 370 leagues (1,277 miles) west of the Azores (which are about the same longitude as the Cape Verde Islands). This included the eastern part of Brazil, though it had not yet been discovered. The Pope received the military support of the Spanish, and the French were forced to withdrawal. Cisneros embarked on his visits to Franciscan monasteries, the beginning of a rigorous reform. Columbus set sail with 17 ships and 1,500 men, including a priest, Fray Buil, who proved ineffective (25 September 1493).

Episode 29. “Born to Rule”. (1495-1496). Concerns hostilities with France and Spain’s efforts to counteract French actions in Italy. It shows the efforts of King Charles of France to have the Pope declare him King of Naples, but the Pope (Alexander VI) demurs and awaits Spanish assistance. Also covers installation of Cisneros as Archbishop of Toledo, which means primate of Spain (1495). The movie follows this closely. The episode also covers reports of the problems in the New World due to Columbus’ mismanagement, though Isabella wants more firsthand knowledge. It also shows Isabella and Ferdinand’s efforts to create the Holy League to deal with France and the Muslims. Isabella and Ferdinand engineer marriages of their children with European royalty to cement the alliances. The agreement of Phillip the Fair 1478-1506) to take their daughter Juana as wife is shown. The marriage of young Catalina (Catherine of Aragon) to an English nobleman (not King Henry VIII) is also arranged.

Episode 30. “Fatal Attraction.” (1496). The episode title probably refers to the attraction of Princess Juana and Philip the Fair. Juana is shown in a favorable light, as someone fragile and uncertain. The episode covers the simmering conflict with France over southern Italy and the Pope’s (Alexander VI) efforts to steer a middle course. It also covers France’s attack on Aragon holdings in northern Spain. Isabella’s mother dies, and evidence is shown of the frailty of Prince Juan, though Isabella and Ferdinand are negotiating for him to marry Margaret of Austria (a Hapsburg, 1480-1530, sister of Philip the Fair). Likewise they have arranged the marriage of Juana to Phillip, which takes place after a harrowing sea voyage of a large Spanish fleet. She is accompanied by Ambassador Gutierre Gómez de Fuensalida (c. 1450-c. 1534), who manages communication thereafter between the court in Flanders and the Spanish court. Thus, there is a double link planned with the Hapsburgs. Columbus returns and talks about a third voyage, at first rebuffed but later agreed to when the Spanish find out about Portuguese plans. The episode shows the beginning of a love affair between Juana and Columbus’ son, which gets nixed by Isabella, but there is no historical record of this. In this series, Juana is portrayed sympathetically, unlike Phillip. In reality, Columbus’ third voyage was in 1497. As yet no one really knows what has been discovered.

Episode 31. “Drama arrives at the court.” (1496–97). Covers three main areas: the battle against French mercenaries for the port of Ostia, the problems of Cardinal Cisneros with his wayward brother, and the marriages of Ferdinand and Isabella’s children Juan and Maria. Also, more drama from Flanders with Phillip the Fair. For the battle, the “Great Captain” Gonzalo de Cordoba defeats the mercenaries and rescues Rome and the pope from starvation. Juan is married to Maria of Austria (April, 1497). He dies October 4, 1497, devasting his parents. Maria is pregnant by him. Daughter Isabel is to marry Manual I of Portugal, but the marriage is overshadowed by Juan’s untimely death. The Spanish envoy to Flanders Fuensalida learns that the Flemish did not properly accommodate the Spanish contingent sent there with Juana, and as a result most die over the course of the winter of 1496-97.

Episode 32. “Queen of the Whole Peninsula.” (1497). More politics at the court and in Europe. In Flanders, Phillip keeps intercepting letters to and from Juana, so as to isolate her. He tries to be proclaimed king of Aragon (or at least heir apparent) but is rebuffed by Ferdinand. Juana gives birth to a daughter (Leonora, 1498-1558), disappointing Phillip. In France, King Charles dies and the new king connives with Pope Alexander to have his existing marriage annulled so he can marry King Charles’ English wife. Maria of Austria miscarries, so that the potential heir to the throne is lost. Daughter Isabel is pregnant by King Manual of Portugal. Columbus’ son Diego tries to sell pearls that Columbus brought back from the New World, causing anger in the court. By this time, the Spanish are realizing that Columbus did not stumble onto isolated islands, but a whole new continent, with potential riches for the throne. Cisneros begins his campaign to forcibly convert the Muslims in Granada, against the advice of Fray Hernando.

Episode 33. “The Princess of Asturias Dies.” (1498–99). Isabel's daughter dies giving birth to a son Miguel (August, 1498), who would be the heir apparent to the thrones of Portugal and Spain. He survives for a short time. Cisneros is ill but recovers. Fray Hernando, who is respected by the Muslims in Granada, helps to head off a Muslim revolt there. Cisneros, the hardliner, is not liked or respected. Arrangements begin for the marriage of Catalina to the Prince of Wales (Arthur, 1486-1502, son of Henry VII). Pope Alexander gets closer to the French, in part to support the ambitions of his then-cardinal son. Juana is still isolated in Flanders, not getting along well with Phillip; but things improve when he finds that she is again pregnant (with Charles, 1500-1558, later Charles V).

Episode 34. “Isabella overcomes the tragedy.” (1500). Juana gives birth to son Charles, later Charles V (24 February 1500). Little Miguel dies suddenly, leaving Isabella distraught. King Manual I is threatened by a duke, who tries to ally with France. Daughter Maria is betrothed to King Manual, but marriage can’t proceed without a dispensation from the Pope, which the French are demanding that he not give in return for some favors. Ferdinand and King Charles of France sign the Treaty of Granada (11 November 1500), partitioning Naples and establishing peace between them, thwarting efforts of Pope Alexander’s son and the duke in Portugal. Continued friction between Juana and Phillip over his rights in Spain. Continued abuse of Juana by Phillip. Juana’s son Charles is now the heir to the Spanish throne. Isabella gives heartfelt confession to Cisneros. Pope Alexander grants the dispensation and King Manual marries daughter Maria, thwarting plans of the duke who is forced to submit to the king. Muslim revolts in Granada region put down by force by Gonzalo de Cordoba, who is unhappy about the bloodshed.

Episode 35. “Philip and Juana arrive at their kingdoms.” (1500-1502). Columbus sent back in chains to Spain by then-governor Bobadilla. Death of baby Miguel makes Philip and Juana heirs to throne of Castille. They continue their stormy relationship. In November 1500, Ferdinand makes secret treaty with King Louis XII to partition kingdom of Naples. The papal forces, French, and Spanish fight to implement the treaty (June, 1501). Catalina (Catherine of Aragon) leaves for England on 21 May 1501. She lands at Plymouth harbor on October 2, 1501. Juana’s third child, Isabel, is born on July 15. King Louis invites Juana and Philip to travel to Spain via France and stop at the French court, where they arrive on December 7, 1501. They arrive in Spain on January 26, 1502, greeted by Gutierre de Cardenas, causing consternation on the part of Philip and Juana. Philip becomes ill and is healed by a local. They are received by Ferdinand and Isabella three days later. Despite the accusatory letters sent by Bobadilla to Isabella about Columbus, he regains her favor. The friction between Fray Hernando and Cisneros again shows.

Episode 36. “Isabella and Ferdinand or Philip and Juana.” (1502-1503). Philip and Juana together with Ferdinand and Isabella are in Toledo cathedral for the swearing of Juana and Philip as the heirs to the kingdom (May 22, 1502). Catalina’s (Catherine of Aragon) husband Arthur, the Prince of Wales, dies on April 2. An agreement is struck whereby Catalina will wait for the King’s son, Henry, to come of age (he was 6 years younger than Catalina, but they were friends), then they would marry and she would become queen of England (April, 1503). Isabella becomes very sick and doubts arise about her recovery, but she does recover. The storyline deviates from the historical record in that Juana is shown in the movie as storming out of the meeting of the Cortes in Aragon, with signs of her deteriorating mental condition. Philip is not shown as there, though he was. In the movie, Philip is dispatched to France to negotiate peace with the king. According to the historical record, he left to return to Flanders, and the message to do the negotiations came via a messenger after he left. Juana begs to go with him but he rebuffs her. The movie does show that Ferdinand does not trust Philip, but he and Isabella know that they have to do the best they can to establish a relationship with him. Ferdinand is plotting with Gonzalo de Cordoba to defeat the French in Italy.

Episode 37. “They called her Juana la Loca [Juana the Mad].” (1503-1504). Juana has increasingly severe bouts of depression and mental illness, and says that the only thing that will help is to be with Philip. She gives birth to baby Ferdinand (later Holy Roman Emperor, 1503-1564), 10 March 1503. Philip negotiates a bad treaty with France, which is repudiated by Fernando. The Spanish win battles and convince Pope Alexander to take their side. He dies before he can do so (18 August 1503). Cisneros and Gonzalo convince Juana to retire to a palace in Medina del Campo. After receiving a letter from Philip, she determines to go to Flanders, and in a famous incident, sits in the cold, screaming out of the gate that she is a prisoner. She is heard and the locals call her “la Loca” (November 21, 1503). At other times she verbally attacks Isabella and others who are trying to help her, then later repents (also well documented), indicating a mental problem. A truce is arranged with France after Gonzalo de Cordoba wins a decisive battle on the Garigliano River (not shown in the movie). The truce is signed on January 30, 1504. Juana leaves for Flanders on March 1, 1504. Philip has been there for some time.

Episode 38. “Will they preserve Isabella’s legacy?” (1504). Juana’s psychological problems do not improve with her return to Flanders, though Philip’s sister Margaret attempts to help her. Philip gets fed up and essentially puts her under house arrest, separated from her children. The scene in November of 1504 when Juana is confined in a room above Philip’s, and bangs on the floor all night is in the movie. Concern rises in Spain about the royal succession, because Ferdinand does not want Philip ruling by himself, and because Isabella sickness is getting worse. Philip wants to inherit the throne of Castile, but needs Juana for that. Ferdinand and Isabella try to get baby Carlos back to Spain to be raised as the heir that they need, but Philip sends him off with Margaret to be raised elsewhere in Flanders. Rumors circulate that the King of England (Henry VII) is looking to marry Juana La Beltraneja, but turn out to be false. The Spanish defeated the French in Naples. A nun is a convent is falsely accused, but the guilty one is another nun, the niece of the younger Beltran de la Cueva (Marquis de Villena). Cisneros orders her out of the convent, leading to a confrontation with Isabella, who subsequently tells Cisneros to bring her back. Isabella asks to see her three surviving daughters again, but Philip refuses to let Juana go.

Episode 39. “The death of Isabella.” (1504). Isabella’s condition continues to worsen. She is still staying in Medina del Campo. Juana is still confined by Philip and is doing poorly, not responding to attempts by Margaret, Philip, or Ambassador Fuensalida to revive her spirits. Her problems are known by Ferdinand and Isabella, and Ferdinand is extremely worried about Juana becoming queen if Isabella dies. Philip gives Fuensalida a notebook documenting Juana’s behavior, later demanding it back. Philip desperately wants to become king in Castille, but can’t without Juana, so he tries various subterfuges which don’t work because Juana, in her saner moments, sees through them. Columbus is back from his last voyage and wants to see the Queen, but she is too ill to receive him. Another ambassador, Belmonte, is conspiring with the Marquis de Villena but supposedly working for Ferdinand. He is discovered. There is a final meeting between Villena and Isabella, where she tells him that he will get properties back but that he has always been a problem for the kingdom. Isabella dies in a touching scene (26 November 1504), and afterwards Ferdinand yields the rule to Juana.

* * *

Comment on the series. An epochal production such as this, nearly 50 hours, is not easy to characterize. The sets, the acting, the music, the cinematography, and script are all of the highest quality. All the characters have personality, and the movie concentrates more on psychology and historical forces rather than large battle scenes or maritime adventures. The production is fairly close to the actual events, though of course we have no written record of most of the scenes, so the script writers had to create that dialogue. With such a movie, the modern viewer is astonished to see, time and again, people acting in their own interest (for good or evil) or in that pertaining to their duty, oblivious to the overall historical drama of which they form part. For example, in episode 9, during a reception for a number of nobles and officials, Ferdinand and Isabella are introduced after their engagement in 1469. Obviously, not a single person in that room could have had even the vaguest idea that these two, in less than 25 years, would drastically and irrevocably change the entire course of world history, and put Spain on the path of the richest and most powerful country in the world for two centuries. But of course, the viewer knows it, and almost wants to go back to tell them.

Follow on production about Juana and the events after Isabella’s death (1504-1516)

There is a 2-hour production single Blu-Ray DVD about Juana called La Corona Partida. Spanish subtitles only. Designated as Region B and does not play on US players (it might be playable on your computer, or buy a region-free player). It can be purchased here from Amazon.

Synopsis

This production uses the same actors and sets as the Isabel series. It begins with Isabella’s funeral, and then takes up the problems between Juana and Philip, as well as Ferdinand’s efforts to keep the reign going. He is beset by nobles who want their freedom and privileges back, but he is smart enough to know that he needs Cisneros’ help. Juana keeps rejecting Philip’s overtures, and eventually he locks her away in some sort of jail. Margaret sends a note to her father (and Philip’s father), Emperor Maximilian, who comes and frees Juana, and reads the riot act to Philip. Ferdinand decides to marry again, hoping to have a son who would prevent the Iberian peninsula from falling to the Hapsburgs, though this would disinherit his daughter Juana, mother of the future Charles V. Ferdinand married French princess Germaine de Foix (1488-1536) on 19 October 1505 by proxy (not shown in the movie). The efforts of Juana to gain control are shown, but she ultimately gives up. There are meetings between Ferdinand and Philip to try to resolve matters, but they are only partially successful. Several events in Castile in June and July, 1506 are shown.

Philip was proclaimed king on 27 June 1506 by the Cortes of Valladolid. In the movie, after a vigorous sports match in Borgos, he sickened and died (25 September 1506). This triggers the well-known odd behavior of Juana, toting her husband’s corpse around Spain. The movie condenses the time from 1506 to 1516 in a few minutes, so few details are covered. The movie shows Fernando getting Juana to sign a document entrusting rule of Castile to him, which he later transferred to Cisneros, and then seems to indicate that he dies soon after Philip. In reality, he was gone to Italy and didn’t return until 1507, during which time Cisneros ruled. He lives on, and a child is born to Germaine in 1509, but dies the same day. Ferdinand takes Philip’s casket from her in 1509 and confines her to an old castle in Tordesillas for the rest of her life (this is shown). She dies in 1555. Ferdinand lives on to January, 1516. At this point, the kingdom passes to Charles.

Follow-on production about Charles V

There is another follow on production, 21 hours, 5 Blu-Ray DVD set entitled Carlos V, about Charles V and his reign. Spanish subtitles only. Designated Region B, but it plays on US players so it is probably region-free. It can also be purchased here from Amazon.

== Production ==
The project for Isabel's biopic was first tasked by Televisión Española (TVE) to Isla Producciones, but TVE did not find the screenplay satisfactory. The series was then commissioned to Diagonal TV, with a writing team formed by Javier Olivares, Jordi Calafí and Anaïs Schaaff. Filming began in Summer 2011 and took place in several Spanish cities: Cáceres, Madrid and Segovia. The first season premiered on 10 September 2012, after an eight-month delay. The series was initially expected to debut on 30 January 2012, but a budget cut for TVE postponed the premiere.

In November 2012, the show was renewed for a second season. After disagreements with Diagonal TV early in the production of season 1, series creator's Javier Olivares determined not to return for the next season. Filming of the second season began in February 2013. Part of the shooting took place on location at the Alhambra in Granada. TVE approved the third season in July 2013 before the second season premiered.

== International broadcasts ==
The rights to broadcast Isabel were acquired in the United Kingdom by Sky Arts in 2013.

In Mexico, Canal 22 acquired the rights and premiered the series on 6 August 2013.

In Chile, the series airs on TVN.

In Brazil, the series is aired daily on + Globosat

In Israel, the series aired weekly during 2017 on yes (Israel)'s Viva channel.

In Bulgaria the series (Isabell of Castile) starts on 5 February 2014 air on bTV.

In the United States, the series aired on Estrella TV on Sunday nights from 16 March 2014 until 2018.

In the Arab World, Isabel airs on weekdays on MBC Action.

In Serbia, the series airs on national television RTS1 .

== Awards ==
Year	Award	Category	Nominee(s)	Result	Ref.
2012	Ondas Awards	Best Spanish Series	Isabel	Won	
2013	New York Latin ACE Awards	Best Cultural Program / Series	Isabel	Won	
2013	New York Latin ACE Awards	Best Actress	Michelle Jenner	Won	
2013	New York Latin ACE Awards	Best Supporting Actor	Pablo Derqui	Won	
2013	Fotogramas de Plata	Best TV Actor	Rodolfo Sancho	Nominated	
2013	Fotogramas de Plata	Best TV Actress	Michelle Jenner	Won	
2013	Iris Awards	Best Fiction	Isabel	Won	
2013	Iris Awards	Best Actor	Rodolfo Sancho	Won	
2013	Iris Awards	Best Actress	Michelle Jenner	Nominated	
2013	Iris Awards	Best Writing	Writing team	Nominated	
2013	Iris Awards	Best Direction	Jordi Frades	Won	
2013	Iris Awards	Best Production	Jaume Banacolocha and Joan Bas	Nominated	
2013	Iris Awards	Best Art Direction	Marcelo Pacheco and Pepe Reyes	Won	
2013	Iris Awards	Best Makeup and Hairstyling	Makeup and Hairstyling team	Nominated	
2013	Actors and Actresses Union Awards	Best TV Lead Actor	Ginés García Millán	Nominated	
2013	Actors and Actresses Union Awards	Best TV Lead Actor	Pablo Derqui	Nominated	
2013	Actors and Actresses Union Awards	Best TV Lead Actress	Michelle Jenner	Nominated	
2013	Actors and Actresses Union Awards	Best TV Supporting Actor	Pedro Casablanc	Won	
2013	Actors and Actresses Union Awards	Best TV Supporting Actor	Sergio Peris-Mencheta	Nominated	
2013	Actors and Actresses Union Awards	Best TV Supporting Actress	Bárbara Lennie	Nominated	
2013	Actors and Actresses Union Awards	Best TV Actress in a Minor Role	Clara Sanchís	Nominated	
2013	World Media Festival	Best International Series	Isabel	Silver Award	
2013	New York Festivals World's Best TV & Films	Best Drama	Isabel	Nominated	
2013	Premios Zapping	Best Series	Isabel	Won	
2013	Premios Zapping	Best Actress	Michelle Jenner	Nominated	

== Other media ==
=== La corona partida and Carlos, Rey Emperador ===
In April 2015, TVE announced the production of the film La corona partida. The film focuses on the aftermath of Queen Isabella's death. Jordi Frades, director of the series, also directed the film, and Rodolfo Sancho (as King Ferdinand), Irene Escolar (as Joanna the Mad), Raúl Merida (as Philip the Handsome) and Eusebio Poncela (as Francisco Jiménez de Cisneros) reprised their roles. The film served as the link between Isabel and the series Carlos, rey emperador, which is based upon the reign of Charles I, Isabella's grandson.

=== Crossover with El ministerio del tiempo ===
Michelle Jenner and Eusebio Poncela reprised the roles of Isabella I of Castile and Francisco Jiménez de Cisneros respectively in the El ministerio del tiempo episode "Una negociación a tiempo".
