= Ainhoa Santamaría =

Spanish actress

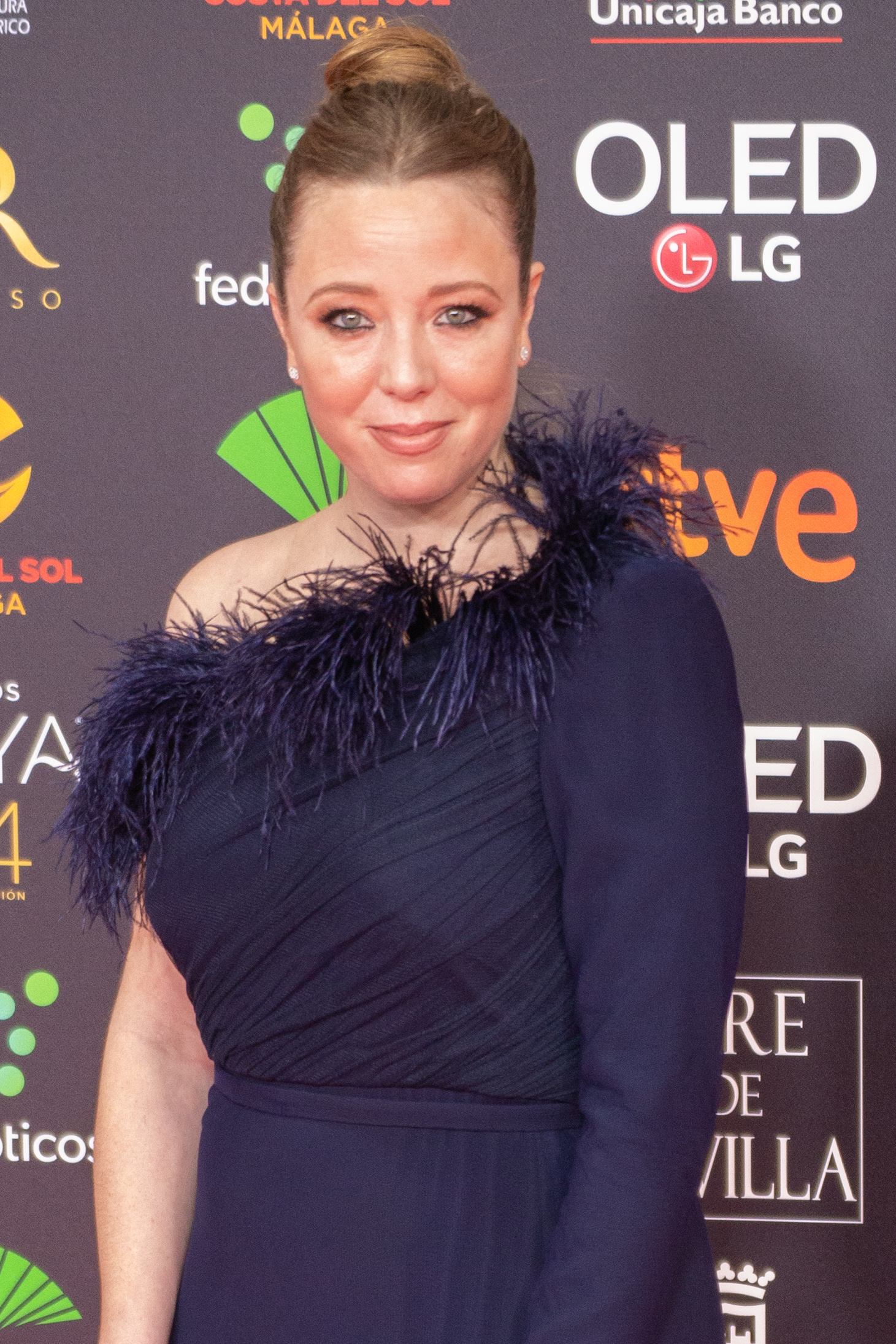
- At the 34th Goya Awards in 2020
- Born: 1980 (age 45–46); Vitoria-Gasteiz, Spain
- Education: RESAD
- Occupation: Actress

Ainhoa Santamaría (born 1980) is a Spanish film, stage and television actress, known for her performances in television series such as Isabel and Señoras del (h)AMPA.

== Biography ==
Born in Vitoria-Gasteiz, Álava, in 1980, she decided to become an actress at age 16, debuting in stage plays in 1997. However, she moved to Zaragoza to study history of art. She eventually graduated from the Madrid's RESAD (2001–2005).

After starting her television career with performances in series such as El comisario, Con dos tacones, La chica de ayer and Amar en tiempos revueltos, she landed a role as Beatriz de Bobadilla (confidant of Isabella of Castile) in the historical drama series Isabel, playing the role for the three seasons of the series.

She appeared in the first two seasons of Money Heist in the guest role of Laura, the wife of Arturo Román, and also features in the first three seasons of Elite as the clueless investigator digging on the murders happening in the series. She featured in the first season of the dark comedy Señoras del (h)AMPA in the role of Anabel. While initially portrayed as a figure adversarial to the protagonist female gang (an "avenger" of the death of Elvira), the character of Anabel returned in the second season more as an ally of the gang.

Her performance as Enriqueta Carbonell, the wife of protestant pastor Atilano Coco in the 2019 film While at War, earned her a nomination to the Goya Award for Best New Actress.

== Filmography ==
Television

Year	Title	Role	Notes	Ref.
2012–14	Isabel	Beatriz de Bobadilla		
2017	La casa de papel (Money Heist)	Laura		
2018–20	Élite (Elite)	Inspectora		
2019–21	Señoras del (h)AMPA	Anabel		
2024	La pasión turca	Laura		

Film

Year	Title	Role	Notes	Ref.
2016	La corona partida	Beatriz de Bobadilla	Reprise of her role in Isabel	
2019	Mientras dure la guerra (While at War)	Enriqueta Carbonell		
2021	Madres paralelas (Parallel Mothers)	Babysitter		
2021	Las leyes de la frontera (Outlaws)	Rosa		

== Accolades ==
Year	Award	Category	Work	Result	Ref.
2011	20th Actors and Actresses Union Awards	Best Stage Actress in a Minor Role	Todos eran mis hijos	Nominated	
2015	24th Actors and Actresses Union Awards	Best TV Actress in a Secondary Role	Isabel	Nominated	
2017	20th Max Awards	Best Supporting Actress	La estupidez	Won	
2020	34th Goya Awards	Best New Actress	While at War	Nominated	
