= The Valdemar Legacy =

- Spanish: La herencia Valdemar
- Directed by: José Luis Alemán
- Screenplay by: José Luis Alemán
- Starring: Laia Marull; Daniele Liotti; Paul Naschy; Silvia Abascal; Ana Risueño; Óscar Jaenada
- Cinematography: David Azcano
- Edited by: Frank Gutiérrez
- Music by: Arnau Bataller
- Production company: La Cruzada Entertainment
- Distributed by: Universal Pictures International Spain
- Release date: 20 January 2010
- Country: Spain
- Language: Spanish

The Valdemar Legacy (Spanish: La herencia Valdemar) is a 2010 Spanish pastiche horror film directed and written by José Luis Alemán which stars Laia Marull, Daniele Liotti, Paul Naschy, Silvia Abascal, Ana Risueño and Óscar Jaenada, among others. Ending with an unresolved plot, it is followed by The Valdemar Legacy II: The Forbidden Shadow. While drawing from the Cthulhu Mythos, the plot does not closely adapt a particular Lovecraftian story. It was panned by critics.

== Plot ==
Set in two different timelines, the plot uses an extensive analepsis to the 19th century. The film ends abruptly with a cliffhanger, only focusing on the flashback subplot pertaining the tragedy of the Valdemar couple (Lázaro and Leonor) circa 1880, thus leaving the plot not set in the past forgotten as a sort of disconnected preface.

== Cast ==
- Silvia Abascal as Luisa Llorente
- Óscar Jaenada as Nicolás Trámel
- Norma Ruiz as Ana
- Rodolfo Sancho as Eduardo Campins
- Eusebio Poncela as Maximilian Colvin
- Daniele Liotti as Lázaro Valdemar
- Laia Marull as Leonor Valdemar
- Ana Risueño as Doctora Cerviá.
- Paul Naschy as Jervás.
- Luis Zahera as Lovecraft
- Paco Maestre as Aleister Crowley
- Vanesa Suárez as Lizzie Borden
- Lino Braxe as Bram Stoker
- Laura Toledo as Belle Gunnes
- Lucas Trapaza as Luliu Fuchini

== Production ==
The film was produced by La Cruzada Entertainment SL. Shooting locations included Comillas, Azpeitia, Valporquero and La Granjilla.

== Release ==
The film was theatrically released in Spain on 22 January 2010.

== Reception ==
Reviews were generally negative, citing the mediocrity of the film. In the wake of the appalling reception, the director wrote a letter apologizing for splitting the film into two parts and pointing out that the overacting of the actors was done on purpose to seek the essence of classic horror films.

Javier Ocaña of El País considered that the narrative structure of The Valdemar Legacy made no sense, also assessing that, in too many sequences, "it looks like a film with professional means commanded by an amateur".

Irene Crespo of Cinemanía rated the film 2½ out of 5 stars, deeming it to be "tremendously risky".

Manuel J. Lombardo of Diario de Sevilla considered the film to be a double disappointment for the viewer, because of the low quality and also because of the obligation of having to go to the theatre again to find out how the thing ends, dragged by failures such as an "absolute inability to narrate", "no sense of rhythm or ellipsis", a "very poor mise-en-scène", a null sense of atmosphere or horror, as well as "lamentable performances" and "second-rate digital effects".

== See also ==
- List of Spanish films of 2010
