= Arrebato =

1979 Spanish art house horror film by Iván Zulueta

- Original Spanish release poster
- Directed by: Iván Zulueta
- Written by: Iván Zulueta
- Produced by: Nicolás Astiarraga
- Starring: Eusebio Poncela; Cecilia Roth; Will More; Marta Fernández Muro; Carmen Giralt; Helena Fernán-Gómez
- Cinematography: Ángel Luis Fernández
- Edited by: José Luis Peláez; José Pérez Luna; María Elena Sáinz de Rozas
- Music by: Negativo; Iván Zulueta
- Release date: 2 March 1979 (Spain)
- Running time: 105 minutes
- Country: Spain
- Language: Spanish

Arrebato ([areˈβato], "Rapture") is a 1979 Spanish art house horror film written and directed by Ivan Zulueta. It was Zulueta's final feature film and is considered to be a cult classic of Spanish Cinema and is counted as part of the art movement La Movida Madrileña.

== Plot ==
José Sirgado (Eusebio Poncela) is a frustrated horror film director and heroin addict in a tumultuous relationship with Ana Turner (Cecilia Roth). The cousin of his ex-girlfriend Marta, Pedro (Will More), sends him a reel of film, an audio cassette, and the key to his apartment despite the fact that the two have only met twice. As José and Ana listen, the audio cassette narrates the two occasions when the two men met. These occasions are shown in flashback. The first occasion was when José came with Marta to scout the family's home for a filming location. Pedro, an obsessive maker of homemade films, snorts heroin with José and asks if he knows how to film time-lapse photography. Pedro shows José his home movies, which he has never shown to anyone. Later, José, mails Pedro an interval timer that would control his camera's shutter, shooting at specified intervals.

The second occasion the two men met, José returns with Ana to watch Pedro's films, and Pedro gives Ana a Betty Boop doll that had apparently been hers as a child. Later, José and Ana, remembering this visit, decide to watch the mysterious reel of film while listening to the rest of the audio cassette. On the tape, Pedro describes his life after receiving the interval timer. Pedro explains that one night after falling asleep he discovered that his camera turned on by itself and filmed him. After developing the film, he discovers a single red frame in which the camera has lost the image of his sleeping. Curious, Pedro allows the camera to film him multiple times as he sleeps, only to discover that the red still frames are growing in number. Pedro discovers that if he does not film himself during sleep, he experiences withdrawal symptoms, similar to heroin withdrawal. Upon waking from these filmed sleeps, Pedro feels revitalized, "enraptured", and becomes convinced that whatever happens during the red portion of the film is responsible for this feeling. Unsure of what the frames mean, he asks his cousin Marta to watch him as he sleeps. As she watches one of his films, the camera moves on its own to face Marta, who disappears. When he only has one more frame left before the entire film becomes red.

Pedro sends the film, his audio instructions, and the key to José, instructing him to come to his apartment and develop the final film. José complies, finding the apartment empty, and discovers the film to be entirely red except for one frame of Pedro's face. The image begins to move, with Pedro gesturing towards the bed with a subtle smile, implying that José should also let the camera film him as he sleeps; the image becomes blurred and then changes into José's own face, which makes a similar gesture. The final scene of the film finds José getting into Pedro's bed to experience the same "rapture" as his friend.

== Cast ==
- Eusebio Poncela as José Sirgado
- Cecilia Roth as Ana Turner
- Will More as Pedro
- Marta Fernández Muro as Marta
- Helena Fernán-Gómez as Gloria
- Carmen Giralt as Tía Carmen
- Max Madera as Chapero

== Development ==
Director Ivan Zulueta himself was a heroin addict since before he started developing the film and this influenced the film's concept strongly. The film was produced in 1979.

Zulueta cast Pedro Almodóvar in a small voice acting role. Almodóvar provides a voice dub invoking an exaggerated femininity for the character of Gloria, which is played by Helena Fernán-Gómez.

== Release ==
The film was initially not a commercial success, but got a good response from film critics and subsequently became a cult favorite and a classic cinema according to El País. The film had its premiere on 9 June 1980 in the Cine Azul in Madrid, but was shown for only 13 days. A few months after this, the cinema Alphaville in Madrid showed the film during midnight movie screenings for a year. The film was still relatively little seen until it gained a wider spectatorship with a DVD release in the 2000s.

=== Critical response ===
Ángel Fernández-Santos wrote in the newspaper El País: “Arrebato is a dark moment of pessimism. It is intricate cinema, unfathomable at some point of its crooked and tumultuous route. And it is, above all, cinema in living meat, disturbing, painful and elevated."

Jorge Fidalgo from CineDivergente.com praised the film, comparing it to Ingmar Bergman's Persona, writing, "Iván Zulueta, as did Bergman with Persona, moves away from the thematic and technical assumptions of conventional cinema, and chooses to play freely with the elements of audiovisual language, making Arrebato a challenge for film exegesis and a quasi-lysergic experience for the spectators."

Time Out gave the film a positive review, calling it "A hallucinatory, claustrophobic examination of the secret potency of film itself". Annie Choi from The Bleeding Skull gave the film a mostly positive review, praising the film's cinematography, mood, and director Zulueta's building of tension, while criticizing the film's uncompelling characters, "taxing" narration, and "inscrutable" plot.
