= Irene Escolar =

Spanish actress (born 1988)

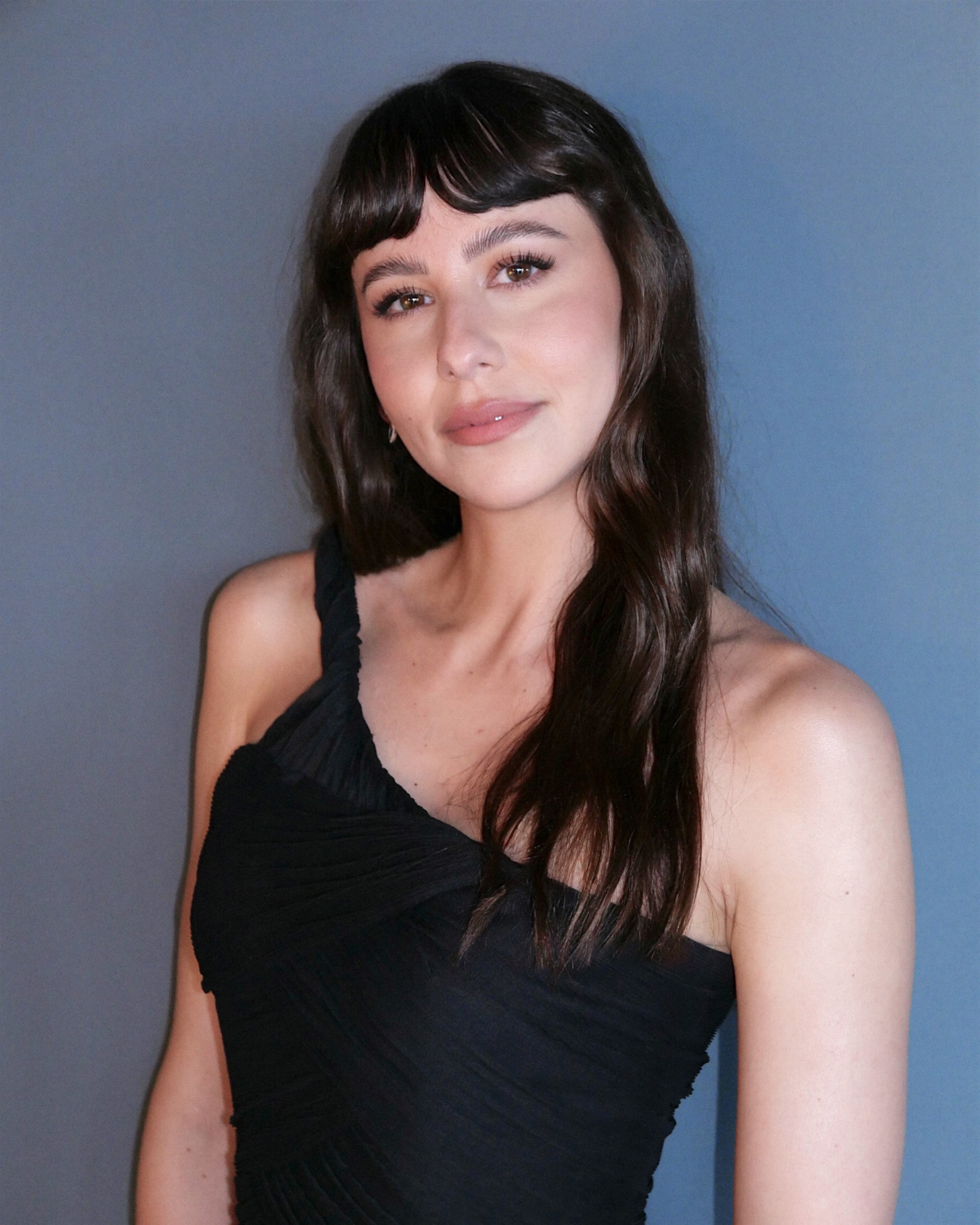
- 2025 Goya Awards
- Born: Irene Escolar Navarro; 19 October 1988 (age 37); Madrid, Spain
- Occupation: Actress
- Years active: 2003–present

Irene Escolar Navarro (born 19 October 1988) is a Spanish cinema, theatre, and television actress.

== Life and career ==
Irene Escolar Navarro was born in Madrid on 19 October 1988 to Lourdes Navarro (screenwriter) and José Luis Escolar (producer). She belongs to a lineage of artists tracing back to her great-great-great grandfather Pascual Alba, which also includes Julia Gutiérrez Caba (great-aunt) and Emilio Gutiérrez Caba (great-uncle). Escolar received a Goya Award for Best New Actress in 2016, and an Irizar Award at the San Sebastián International Film Festival for her critically acclaimed role of June in An Autumn Without Berlin. Escolar is fluent in Spanish, English, and French. Her professional life includes 17 films and 25 theatre plays. She is also well known for her theatre career. In 2019 she was picked to play the leading role in Movistar +'s first international series, Dime Quién Soy. The world premiere of the show was in 2020. Escolar is the creator and executive producer, alongside Bárbara Lennie, of Escenario 0 for HBO Europe.

== Filmography ==
=== Film ===
| Year | Title | Original title | Role | Notes |
|---|---|---|---|---|
| 2003 | Imagining Argentina | Imagining Argentina | Eurydice | |
| 2004 | The 7th Day | El 7º día | Antonia | |
| 2007 | Lolita's Club | Canciones de amor en Lolita's Club | Jennifer | |
| 2008 | The Blind Sunflowers | Los girasoles ciegos | Elenita | |
| 2009 | Road to Santiago | Al final del camino | Laura | |
| 2010 | The Impossible Language | El idioma imposible | Elsa | |
| 2010 | Lock Up | Cruzando el límite | Nuria | |
| 2013 | People in Places | Gente en sitios | | |
| 2013 | Inside Love | Presentimientos | Sandra | |
| 2015 | Sidetracked | Las ovejas no pierden el tren | Natalia | |
| 2015 | An Autumn Without Berlin | Un otoño sin Berlín | June | Goya Award for Best New Actress |
| 2016 | The Broken Crown | La corona partida | Joanna of Castile | |
| 2016 | Altamira | Altamira | María | |
| 2016 | Guernica | Gernika | Cousin Isabel | |
| 2017 | The Skin of the Wolf | Bajo la piel de lobo | Adela | |
| 2018 | The Laws of Thermodynamics | Las leyes de la termodinámica | Raquel | |
| 2021 | Official Competition | Competencia oficial | Diana Suárez | |
| 2022 | You Have to Come and See It | Tenéis que venir a verla | Susana | |
| 2023 | The Girls Are Alright | Las chicas están bien | Irene | |
| 2024 | Free Falling | Caída libre | Claudia | |
| 2024 | Family Affairs | Verano en diciembre | Noelia | |
| 2024 | Ariel | Ariel | Ariel | |
| 2025 | A Dry Mouth | Ceniza en la boca | | |

=== Television ===
| Year | Title | Original title | Role | Notes |
|---|---|---|---|---|
| 2005 | El comisario | El comisario | | Episode: "Grito mudo" |
| 2008 | Lex | Lex | | Episode: "Genéticamente infiel" |
| 2014 | Isabel | Isabel | Joanna of Castile | 12 episodes |
| 2019 | Paquita Salas | Paquita Salas | Irene | Episode: "B-Fashion" |
| 2020 | Stage 0 | Escenario 0 | Irene | 3 episodes |
| 2020–2021 | Tell Me Who I Am | Dime quién soy | Amelia Garayoa | 9 episodes |
| 2024 | Past Lies | Las largas sombras | Paula Ríos | 6 episodes |
| 2024 | Las abogadas | Las abogadas | Manuela Carmena | 6 episodes |
| 2025 | La Ruta. Vol. 2: Ibiza | La ruta | Violeta / Olivia | Elenco principal; 6 episodios |
