= Gutierre Gómez de Fuensalida =

Castilian diplomat, soldier and politician (c. 1450 - c. 1534)

Gutierre Gómez de Fuensalida (c. 1450 - c. 1534) was a Castilian diplomat, soldier and politician, ambassador of the Catholic Monarchs to the Holy Roman Empire, the County of Flanders and the Kingdom of England between 1496 and 1509. He was also mayor of Granada, mayor of Málaga, commander of Membrilla, de los Bastimentos and Villaescusa de Haro and knight of the Order of Santiago.

== Biography ==
During his long life, Gutierre Gómez de Fuensalida served in wars, embassies and positions of great importance during the reign of the Catholic Monarchs and even in the times of Emperor Charles V. He must have been born around 1450, based on what can be deduced from his correspondence and will. He was the son of Alonso Gutiérrez de Fuensalida, commander of Montealegre and direct descendant of Gil García Laso de la Vega. His mother was Juana Téllez de Toledo, belonging, therefore, to a family of illustrious ancestry.

In 1470 he married in Requena with María de Arroniz, daughter of Sancho de Arroniz, who had stood out for his participation in the conquest of numerous cities during the times of the Catholic Monarchs. In 1475, upon the death of his father, he received the command of Villaescusa de Haro, a position that would increase over the years.

During his youth and even in his maturity he was under the orders of Rodrigo Manrique de Lara, Count of Paredes, having to take part, therefore, in numerous battles and military encounters derived from the royal offensive towards the last enclaves of Muslim Spain carried out by The Catholic kings. In fact, he must have had a very active presence in the campaigns prior to the conquest of Granada, as confirmed by the references that appeared in numerous sources and chronicles of the time.

Likewise, he contributed to the recovery by the Monarchs of numerous towns and places that had escaped royal control, which caused enmity and confrontation with some sectors of the nobility that caused numerous economic and material losses to their heritage, which, despite the complaints he sent to the Kings, they were never attended to.

After the Granada war was over, or possibly some time before, he settled in the city of Malaga, to whose conquest, in 1487, he must have also contributed. He resided there with his family, more or less continuously, especially from 1492, until he re-entered royal service in 1494.

From then until 1496, the year in which he joined the diplomatic work that recognized him as one of the most skillful ambassadors of the Catholic Monarchs, and, although there is hardly any documentary news about it, it is assumed that he must have been busy in matters of some importance, because otherwise it would not be possible to understand that King Ferdinand entrusted him with missions of such importance as those he carried out in Germany, Flanders and England. He accompanied Joanna of Castile during her stay in Flanders. He served in such positions until 1510, the year in which he settled in Granada when he was appointed mayor and mayor of the city.

Since 1517 he appears permanently settled in Málaga, where he undertook some foundations, and where from 1518 he held the position of city councilor. He died there around 1534.

== Popular culture ==
- The actor Fernando Guillén Cuervo played Gómez de Fuensalida in the series Isabel (2012–2014) on Televisión Española and in the movie "The Broken Crown", sequel to said series.
