= Rafael Alcázar =

Spanish screenwriter, film director and producer

Rafael Alcázar is a Spanish screenwriter, film director and producer.

== Filmography ==
- No hagas planes con Marga (1988)
- Laberinto griego, El (1993)
- Corsarios del chip (1996)
- Besos de gato (2003)
- Locuras de Don Quijote, Las (2006)
