= Iván Zulueta =

Spanish designer and film director

- Born: Juan Ricardo Miguel Zulueta Vergarajauregui; 29 October 1943; San Sebastián, Gipuzkoa, Spain
- Died: 30 December 2009 (aged 66); San Sebastián, Gipuzkoa, Spain
- Occupations: Director, writer
- Years active: 1966–2000

Juan Ricardo Miguel Zulueta Vergarajauregui, better known as Iván Zulueta (29 September 1943 – 30 December 2009), was a designer and film director. His work spanned different fields such as art designer in movies or music and he was mainly known for writing and directing the film Arrebato (Rapture), and for designing the posters and promotion of Pedro Almodóvar's first movies.

== Biography ==
=== Childhood and early career ===
Iván Zulueta was born Juan Ricardo Miguel due to the Russian origin of that name, which was not allowed by anti-communist Franco's Spanish State, in San Sebastián, Basque Country, Spain. His family was wealthy: his father's family had had sugar factories in Cuba for generations. His father was a lawyer; even though he combined his job with other activities, such as director of the San Sebastian Film Festival. His mother was a painter, even though not professionally. Hence, Iván was surrounded by the arts from an early age.

Zulueta moved to Madrid in 1960 and enrolled in decoration courses. At the end of 1963, he was offered the opportunity of traveling in a merchant vessel to New York City. There, he enrolled in Arts Students League for studying oil painting and advertising drawing. Zulueta discovered pop art, Nouvelle Vague, the New American Cinema and artists such as Jonas Mekas and John Cassavetes.

Coming back to Madrid in 1964, Zulueta enrolled in the Spanish Cinema School. He directed a couple of shorts in 35 mm. The first one, called Agata, based on a short story by Edgar Allan Poe. And the second one, called Ida y Vuelta (Round Trip), based on a short story by William Jenkins. However, he did not get his degree and the School was closed by the Francoist State. Zulueta would not be allowed to sign his works until Franco died because of this.

=== Pop-art and psychedelic ===
In 1968, José Luis Borau, his teacher in the Film School, produced a TV show called Ultimo Grito (Latest Trends). The anchormen were José María Íñigo and Judy Stephen. Iván Zulueta directed the show. The production means and budget were low and therefore among the methodologies employed for this production was to have friends take on the different positions and creative capacities required for its realization.

In 1969, Un, Dos, Tres, Al Escondite Inglés (Hide and Seek) was produced. It Borau's first work as a producer of a full-length movie. The production was carried the same way as in the TV show Ultimo Grito. The film was a musical which made fun of Eurovision contest with a Richard Lester style. It was first released in Cannes Film Festival.

=== 70s: experimentation ===
Borau provided Zulueta with unused film from his newly created production company. Zulueta used it for experimenting mainly with tempo and editing. He also used other underground formats like 16mm or 8mm. Most of the time, the experimentation was related to re-filming preexisting material in other formats and rhythms. This visual style was very popular in those years, used by other directors and achieving a peak with the eminent Koyaanisqatsi (1983). At same time, Zulueta started a prolific career as poster designer.

Zulueta met Pedro Almodóvar and helped him in his first underground short movies. Zulueta also worked as assistant director for other directors such as Jaime Chavarri or Antonio Drove.

Zulueta proposed to hit other non-underground segments of the public by directing a short movie and releasing it. The result: Leo Es Pardo (Leo is Dark); a short movie recorded with a 16mm camera. It was released in the Berlin Film Festival. Then, Zulueta and his collaborators thought that they could try to put all this experimentation onto a full-length film released as a conventional movie...

=== Arrebato (Rapture) ===
A Spanish architect interested in movies decided to help Zulueta financially. The planning was a 15-day filming. However, it was shot in real interiors owned by Zulueta and other friends, like Jaime Chavarri; and most of collaborators used drugs like heroin, that drove the planning and the budget to be highly increased. Pedro Almodóvar dubbed one of the female characters, but he was not credited. The relationship between the director and the producer was poorly damaged. Moreover, the film had a lot of problems to be commercially released due to its experimental and underground style; even though the Spanish transition to democracy had already occurred. It was finally released in 1980. Zulueta was labeled as a problematic auteur and Arrebato became a cult movie.

=== 80s: silence ===
Finally, his heroin addiction forced him to retire temporarily. Living in San Sebastián, he declined offers for new projects in filming industry. On the other hand, Zulueta continued with his career as poster designer. It is in these years when he produced his best known works for Pedro Almodóvar, among others. He also started experimenting with photography.

=== Come-back: "Párpados" & "Ritesti" ===
At the end of the 80s and the beginning of the 90s, Zulueta directed a couple of episodes for two different TV serials. The first one, called “Parpados” (“Eyelids”), was a love story between a couple of twins. The second one, called “Ritesti”, was a horror story. Both were traced by Zulueta's style, visual obsessions, circular screenplay, format mixing (film and video) and a fragmented editing which reminded some of David Lynch movies.

=== Latest years ===
By mid-90s, Zulueta came back to the silence. He continued his work designing posters. However, at the beginning of the 2000s, some personalities in the Spanish film industry rediscovered Zulueta's early work: different exhibitions (paintings, posters and photography) were organized in different Spanish cities such as Madrid or Barcelona; his films were broadcast on TV and cinema again; his short movies were shown on film festivals and Arrebato was first launched on DVD. "Un, Dos, Tres, al Escondite Inglés" was released on VHS and some of his experimental shorts were launched on a limited DVD release.

His death was reported on 30 December 2009.
