= Eduardo Mendicutti =

Spanish writer and journalist (born 1948)

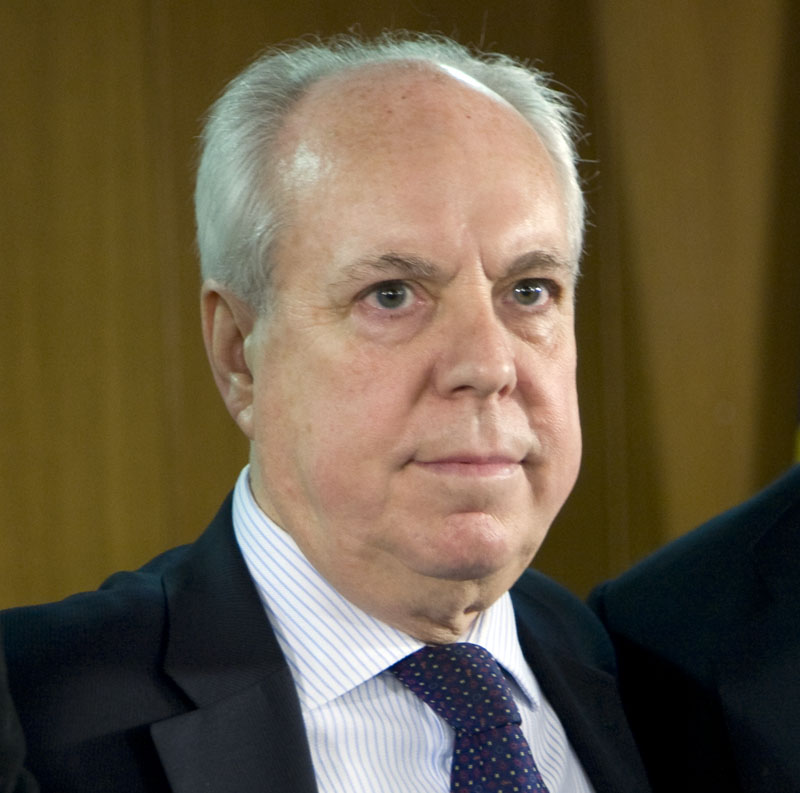
- Eduardo Mendicutti
- Born: March 24, 1948; Sanlúcar de Barrameda, Cádiz, Andalucia, Spain

Eduardo Mendicutti (born March 24, 1948) is a Spanish writer and journalist. Mendicutti was ranked among the top 50 most influential gays in Spain.

== Background ==
Mendicutti was born in Sanlúcar de Barrameda, near Cádiz, a province of Spain where he attended the Instituto Padre Luis Coloma de Jerez school. In 1972, Mendicutti moved to Madrid where he studied journalism and began writing for newspapers and magazines. Mendicutti had a column in the El Mundo, a daily newspaper since its foundation, wrote stories for the now defunct gay Zero and is currently a commentator on television. In 2014, El Mundo ranked him 28 in the most influential 50 gays in Spain saying he is very active in the gay movement. For his public activism, a plaza was built in his honor at his native city.

Mendicutti and Spanish writer Almudena Grandes, who died in 2021, were very good friends.

== Works ==
=== Novels ===
- Una mala noche la tiene cualquiera (1982)
- El salto del ángel (1985)
- Siete contra Georgia (1987)
- Tiempos mejores (1989)
- El palomo cojo (1991)
- Última conversación (1991)
- Los novios búlgaros (1993)
- Yo no tengo la culpa de haber nacido tan sexy (1997)
- El beso del cosaco (2000)
- El ángel descuidado (2002)
- Duelo en Marilyn City (2003)
- California (2005)
- Ganas de hablar (2008)
- Mae West y yo (2011)
- Otra vida para vivirla contigo (2013)
- Furias divinas (2016)
- Malandar (2018)
- Para que vuelvas hoy (2020)

=== Short stories ===
- Fuego de marzo (1995).
- "Solamente una vez", in the anthology Tu piel en mi boca (2004).
- Pasiones fugaces (2004).
- "Canela y oro", in the anthology Lo que no se dice (2014).

=== Chronicle ===
- La Susi en el vestuario blanco (2003). Crónicas veraniegas publicadas en el diario El Mundo, corregidas y completadas.

=== Other ===
- Testimonio en la antología Fobias. Diez escritores cuentan sus miedos (2002).

== Awards ==
Mendicutti has received a number of awards for his works:

- Premio Sésamo 1973 for Tatuaje
- Café Gijón 1974 for Cenizas
- Ciudad de Barbastro 1982 Short story award for Una mala noche la tiene cualquiera
- Premio Cáceres 1984 Short story award for Última conversación
- La Sonrisa Vertical 1987 finalist for Siete contra Georgia
- Premio Nacional de Narrativa 1992 finalist for El palomo cojo
- Andalucía de la Crítica 2002 award for El ángel descuidado
- Nino Gennaro Award, 2012, from the Sicilia Queer filmfest
- Premio Pluma Literaria 2017

== Film adaptions ==
- El Palomo cojo (1995), film directed by Jaime de Armiñán, adapted from novel by the same name.
- Bulgarian Lovers (2003), film directed by Eloy de la Iglesia, adapted from novel by the same name.
