= Locked Up season 4 =

Locked Up
- Season 4
- Promotional poster
- Starring: Najwa Nimri; Maggie Civantos; Berta Vázquez; Alba Flores; María Isabel Díaz Lago; Marta Aledo; Ramiro Blas; Jesús Castejón; Laura Baena; Itziar Castro; Abril Zamora; Adriana Paz; Cristina Marcos; Benjamín Vicuña; Alberto Velasco
- No. of episodes: 8

Release
- Original network: Fox Spain
- Original release: March 12, 2018 – April 2, 2019

Season chronology
- ← Previous; Season 3 Next → El Oasis

The fourth season of the Spanish crime drama television series Vis a Vis premiered on 3 December 2018 and ended on 4 February 2019, consisting of eight episodes. It was produced by Globomedia and broadcast by Fox Spain.

The season deals with the aftermath of Zulema (Najwa Nimri), Saray (Alba Flores) and Altagracia's (Adriana Paz) escape. Altagracia, who used to terrorize the inmates as prison guard, is now one of them. Zulema and Saray, who were once allies, distrust each other. Dr. Sandoval (Ramiro Blas) is the new director of Cruz del Norte and makes the prison a more dangerous environment. Sandoval uses Zulema's past against her. Soledad (María Isabel Díaz Lago) deals with Alzheimer's disease. Macarena (Maggie Civantos) wakes up from her coma.

Season four received several accolades, including nominations from the Spanish Actors Union Awards, Feroz Awards, Platino Awards, and a Fotogramas de Plata win for Nimri. The season is followed by the spin-off El Oasis (2020), which takes place years after the events of the fourth season and servers as the fifth and final season of the series, concluding Macarena and Zulema's story. An audio series that is set after the fourth season, Vis a Vis: La Cara B, was released in September 2020 on Audible. It features 12 episodes and stars Civantos and Nimri, alongside a supporting cast.

== Cast and characters ==
=== Cruz Del Norte Inmates ===
- Najwa Nimri as Zulema Zahir
- Maggie Civantos as Macarena Ferreiro (Episodes 7-8)
- Berta Vázquez as Estefania "Rizos" Kabila
- Alba Flores as Saray Vargas de Jesús
- María Isabel Díaz Lago as Soledad "Sole" Núñez Hurtado
- Marta Aledo as Teresa "Tere" González Largo
- Laura Baena as Antonia Trujillo Díez -
- Itziar Castro as Goya Fernández
- Abril Zamora as Luna Garrido

=== Cruz del Norte Employees ===
- Adriana Paz as Altagracia Guerrero
- Cristina Marcos as Magdalena Cruz
- Benjamín Vicuña as Antonio Hierro
- Alberto Velasco as Antonio Palacios Lloret

=== Police Force ===
- Jesús Castejón as Inspector Damián Castillo

=== Recurring Cast and Guest ===
- Georgina Amorós as Fátima Amin
- Édgar Vittorino as a male prisoner
- Mala Rodriguez as Saray's girlfriend.
- Zaira Pérez as Nuria Millán
- Nahara Calero as Estrella Vargas
- Juan Blanco as Alfonso "El Piti"
- Farah Hamed as Zulema's mother
- Miriam Rodríguez as an inmate part of the choral group.

== Episodes ==
No. overall	No. in season	Title	English title	Directed by	Original release date	Viewers (millions)
33	1	"La Barbie"	"The Barbie"	Marc Vigil	3 December 2018	N/A
34	2	"La fuga"	"The Escape"	Marc Vigil	10 December 2018	N/A
35	3	"El umbral del dolor"	"Threshold of Pain"	Sandra Gallego	17 December 2018	N/A
36	4	"Mamá"	"Mum"	Ramón Salazar	7 January 2019	N/A
37	5	"Traición"	"Betrayal"	Carles Torrens	14 January 2019	N/A
38	6	"Mala persona"	"Bad Person"	Sandra Gallego	21 January 2019	N/A
39	7	"Vuelta a casa"	"Back Home"	Ramón Salazar	28 January 2019	N/A
40	8	"La marea amarilla"	"The Yellow Tide"	Sandra Gallego	4 February 2019	N/A
