= Locked Up season 3 =

Locked Up
- Season 3
- Promotional poster
- Starring: Maggie Civantos; Najwa Nimri; Berta Vázquez; Alba Flores; Inma Cuevas; María Isabel Díaz Lago; Marta Aledo; Ruth Díaz; Laura Baena; Huichi Chiu; Ana Marzoa; Javier Lara; Luis Callejo; Adriana Paz
- No. of episodes: 8

Release
- Original network: Fox Spain
- Original release: April 23 – June 11, 2018

Season chronology
- ← Previous; Season 2 Next → Season 4

The third season of the Spanish crime drama series Vis a Vis premiered on April 23, 2018, and ended on June 11, 2018, with a total of eight episodes. It focuses on the previous Cruz del Sur inmates adopting to the new environment of Cruz del Norte. New characters are introduced, such as a group of Chinese inmates who control prison activities.

After Antena 3 cancelled the show's broadcast, Fox Spain picked up the series for a third and fourth season. Maggie Civantos's role as lead character Macarena Ferrero was reduced to recurring due to her commitments to another show. Production moved to different location, and the previous studio became the set of another Álex Pina show, Money Heist. Najwa Nimri (Zulema), Berta Vázquez (Rizos), María Isabel Díaz Lago (Soledad), Marta Aledo (Tere), Laura Buena (Antonina), and Alba Flores (Saray) returned as main cast members.

The season and cast were nominated for several awards, including Premios Iris Best Director nominations for Jesus Colmenar, Sandra Gallego, David Molina Encinas and Jesus Rodrigo, and Best Actress nomination for Flores; and Feroz Awards, Platino Awards, Fotogramas de Plata, and Premios MiM Best Actress nominations for Nimri.

== Cast and characters ==
=== Cruz Del Norte Inmates ===
- Maggie Civantos as Macarena Ferreiro (Episodes 1–2)
- Najwa Nimri as Zulema Zahir
- Berta Vázquez as Estefania "Rizos" Kabila
- Alba Flores as Saray Vargas de Jesús
- Inma Cuevas as Ana Belén "Anabel" Villaroch Garcés (Episodes 1–4)
- María Isabel Díaz Lago as Soledad "Sole" Núñez Hurtado
- Marta Aledo as Teresa "Tere" González Largo
- Laura Baena as Antonia Trujillo Díez
- Ruth Díaz as Mercedes Carrillo
- Huichi Chiu as Akame
- Ana Marzoa as Prudencia Mosqueira

=== Cruz del Norte Employees ===
- Javier Lara as Álex Moncada
- Luis Callejo as Frutos
- Adriana Paz as Altagracia Guerrero

=== Police Force ===
- Jesús Castejón as Inspector Damián Castillo

=== Recurring Cast and Guests ===
- Itziar Castro as Goya Fernández
- Abril Zamora as Luna Garrido
- Ramiro Blas as Dr. Sandoval
- Irene Anula as Inspector Nerea Rojas
- Zaira Pérez as Nuria Millán
- Carmen Baquero as Alba Vargas de Jesús
- Laura Quirós as Alicia González
- Raúl Tejón as Unai del Álamo
- Ester Expósito as one of the daughters of Fernando

== Episode list ==
No. overall	No. in season	Title	English title	Directed by	Original release date	Viewers (millions)
25	1	"Cruz del Norte"	"North Cross"	Jesús Colmenar	April 23, 2018	N/A
26	2	"Muy fácil o muy difícil"	"Very easy or very difficult"	Jesús Colmenar	April 30, 2018	N/A
27	3	"Un grano de arroz"	"One grain of rice"	Sandra Gallego	May 7, 2018	N/A
28	4	"La bandera en el muro"	"The flag on the wall"	Sandra Gallego	May 14, 2018	N/A
29	5	"Alguien a quien le importes una mierda"	"Someone who doesn't give a shit about"	David Molina	May 21, 2018	N/A
30	6	"Seis meses dan para mucho"	"Six months is a long time"	David Molina	May 28, 2018	N/A
31	7	"Fuimos niñas"	"We were girls"	Sandra Gallego	June 4, 2018	N/A
32	8	"Lo que sabemos de los monstruos"	"What we know about monsters"	Jesús Rodrigo	June 11, 2018	N/A

== Awards and nominations ==
Year	Award	Category	Nominees	Result	Ref.
2018	Premios Iris (ATv)	Best Actress	Alba Flores	Nominated	
2018	Premios Iris (ATv)	Best Director	Jesus Colmenar, Sandra Gallego, David Molina Encinas, Jesus Rodrigo	Nominated	
2018	Premios MiM	Best Drama Series	Vis a vis	Nominated	
2018	Premios MiM	Best Drama Actress	Najwa Nimri	Nominated	
2019	Spanish Actors Union Awards	Best Male Performance in a Minor Role	Jesus Castejon	Nominated	
2019	Spanish Actors Union Awards	Best Female New Comer	Abril Zamora	Nominated	
2019	Feroz Awards	Best Lead Actress	Najwa Nimri	Nominated	
2019	Fotogramas de Plata	Best TV Actress	Najwa Nimri	Won	
2019	The Platino Awards for Iberoamerican Cinema	Best Actress in Mini series or TV Series	Najwa Nimri	Nominated	
2019	Spanish Audio Visual Award	Best TV Show Music	Manel Santisteban, Ivan Martinez Lacamara	Nominated	
