= Vis a vis: El Oasis =

Spanish crime drama television series

- Genre: Drama; Crime; Thriller
- Created by: Iván Escobar
- Screenplay by: Lucía Carballal; J. M. Ruiz Córdoba; Iván Escobar
- Directed by: Sandra Gallego; Miguel Ángel Vivas
- Starring: Najwa Nimri; Maggie Civantos; Itziar Castro; Claudia Riera; Isabel Naveira; Lisi Linder; David Ostrosky; Ana María Picchio
- Country of origin: Spain
- Original language: Spanish
- No. of episodes: 8

Production
- Production companies: FOX Networks Group España; Globomedia

Original release
- Network: Fox Spain
- Release: 20 April – 8 June 2020

Related
- Locked Up

Vis a vis: El Oasis (transl. Face to Face: The Oasis) is a Spanish television miniseries that is a spin-off and the fifth and final season of the Spanish crime drama series Vis a Vis (Locked Up). Starring Maggie Civantos and Najwa Nimri alongside a supporting cast, El Oasis takes place years after the events of the fourth season and focuses on Macarena and Zulema's life outside of prison, concluding their story. It aired in 2020 on Fox Spain.

== Premise ==
Macarena and Zulema decide to organize one last big heist in order to steal a diamond tiara from the daughter of a Mexican drug trafficker so they team up with Goya, Triana and La Flaca (the "Equipo V"). However, the heist doesn't go exactly to plan.

== Cast ==
Main

- Najwa Nimri as Zulema Zahir, "el elfo del infierno"
- Maggie Civantos as Macarena "Maca" Ferreiro Molina, "la rubia"
- Itziar Castro as Goya Fernández, "la gordi "
- Claudia Riera as Triana Azcoitia, "la hacker"
- Isabel Naveira as "la flaca"
- Lisi Linder as Mónica Ramala
- David Ostrosky as Víctor Ramala
- Ana María Picchio as Ama Castro

Recurring

- Alma Itzel as Kati Ramala
- Almagro San Miguel as Diego "Dieguito" Ramala
- Lucas Ferraro as Cepo Sandoval Castro
- Pablo Vázquez as Julián.
- Natalia Hernández as Elena.
- Paula Gallego as Vivi.
- José de la Torre
- Iván Morales.
- Fernando Sansegundo
- Lolo Diego as Apolo
- Ismael Palacios as Lucas

Special collaboration

- Alba Flores as Saray Vargas de Jesús.
- Ramiro Blas as Carlos Sandoval Castro
- Georgina Amorós as Fátima Amin
- Jesús Castejón as Inspector Damián Castillo

Guest

- Mat Cruz as David
- Quique Medina as Acosador
- Daniel Chamorro as Funcionario de Cruz del Norte
- Martina Pérez as Martina
- Guillermo Bedward as Eric

== Production and release ==
The series was presented by FOX España both as spin-off and as fifth and final season of the television series Vis a vis (Locked Up). Created by Iván Escobar, the screenplay was authored by Lucía Carballal, J. M. Ruiz Córdoba and Escobar himself, whereas the episodes were directed by Sandra Gallego and Miguel Ángel Vivas.

Produced by FOX Networks Group España and Globomedia (The Mediapro Studio), filming took place in between the province of Almería and Madrid. Shooting locations included Agua Amarga, Cabo de Gata and the Tabernas desert. The first episode premiered on 20 April 2020. The broadcasting run of the eight-part series ended on 8 June 2020.

| Series | Episodes | Originally released | | | Ref. |
| Series | Episodes | First released | Last released | Network | Ref. |
|---|---|---|---|---|---|
| 1 | 8 | 20 April 2020 | 8 June 2020 | FOX España | |

| No. in season | Title | Original release date |
|---|---|---|
| 1 | "Como esos matrimonios que antes de separarse tienen un hijo" | 20 April 2020 |
| 2 | "La boda" | 27 April 2020 |
| 3 | "Como te quiere una madre" | 4 May 2020 |
| 4 | "Iguales o nada" | 11 May 2020 |
| 5 | "La vida de los mosquitos" | 18 May 2020 |
| 6 | "Odio el sentimentalismo" | 25 May 2020 |
| 7 | "La línea roja" | 1 June 2020 |
| 8 | "¿Quién era Zulema Zahir?" | 8 June 2020 |

== Awards and nominations ==
| Year | Award | Category | Nominee(s) | Result | Ref. |
|---|---|---|---|---|---|
| 2021 | 71st Fotogramas de Plata | Best Television Actress | Maggie Civantos | Nominated | |
