= Fiction set in Equatorial Guinea =

There are several works of fiction set in Equatorial Guinea.

Fernando Po, now Bioko, is featured prominently in the 1975 science fiction work The Illuminatus! Trilogy by Robert Shea and Robert Anton Wilson. The island (and, in turn, the country) experience a series of coups in the story which lead the world to the verge of nuclear war. The story also hypothesizes that Fernando Po is the last remaining piece of the sunken continent of Atlantis.

Due to the country's permissive laws, most of the action in the American novelist Robin Cook's book Chromosome 6 takes place at a primate research facility based in Equatorial Guinea. The book also discusses some of the geography, history and peoples of the country.

Episode 2 of the British sitcom Yes Minister, "The Official Visit", involves the fictional developing country of Buranda in what is actually Equatorial Guinea.

In the 2009 novel Limit by Frank Schätzing, set in 2025, the country's history (and future history) plays a significant role.

The 2011 novel The Informationist by Taylor Stevens is a missing-person thriller that makes detailed use of Equatorial Guinea's mélange of people, economics and geography.

The 2012 Spanish-language novel Palmeras en la nieve by Luz Gabás, as well as its 2015 film adaptation Palm Trees in the Snow, are set in the 1950s and 1960s colonial Spanish Guinea and 2000's Equatorial Guinea.
