= 68th San Sebastián International Film Festival =

2020 film festival

- Opening film: Rifkin's Festival
- Location: San Sebastián, Spain
- Awards: Golden Shell (Beginning)
- Directors: José Luis Rebordinos
- Festival date: 18–26 September 2020

San Sebastián International Film Festival
- 69th 67th

The 68th San Sebastián International Film Festival took place from 18 to 26 September 2020 in San Sebastián, Gipuzkoa, Spain. The festival opened with Woody Allen's Rifkin's Festival. Viggo Mortensen was awarded the Donostia Award for lifetime achievements.

The competitive awards were presented on 26 September 2020. Beginning by Dea Kulumbegashvili swept the official selection prizes, winning the Golden Shell, as well as Best Actress, Screenplay, and Director. Another Round's ensemble lead cast won the Silver Shell for Best Actor.

== Background ==
In June 2020, American actor Viggo Mortensen was announced as recipient of a Donostia Award. Other than the announcement of the opener (Rifkin's Festival, out of competition), the first films confirmed to be in for screening were official selection competitive titles Another Round, True Mothers, Summer of 85, In the Dusk, Beginning, and Any Crybabies Around?. The festival picked up 17 works (13 feature films and 4 short films) that have been pre-selected for the 2020 Cannes Film Festival, cancelled due to the COVID-19 pandemic in France. Cannes Festival director Thierry Fremaux participated in the Zinemaldia's opening gala on 18 September, making together with José Luis Rebordinos a plea for the return of people to the theatres.

== Juries ==
Official Selection

- Luca Guadagnino (President)
- Joe Alwyn
- Marisa Fernández Armenteros
- Michel Franco
- Lena Mossum

== Sections ==
=== Official Selection ===
In competition

The lineup of films selected for the Official Selection is as follows:

Highlighted title indicates award winner.

English title	Original title	Director(s)	Production country
Summer of 85	Été 85	François Ozon	France
True Mothers	朝が来る	Naomi Kawase	Japan
Courtroom 3H		Antonio Méndez Esparza	Spain; United States
Crock of Gold: A Few Rounds with Shane MacGowan		Julien Temple	United Kingdom
Beginning	დასაწყისი	Dea Kulumbegashvili	France; Georgia
Another Round	Druk	Thomas Vinterberg	Denmark; Sweden; Netherlands
Any Crybabies Around?	泣く子はいねぇが	Takuma Sato	Japan
We Will Never Die	Nosotros nunca moriremos	Eduardo Crespo	Argentina
Simple Passion	Passion simple	Danielle Arbid	France; Belgium
Supernova		Harry Macqueen	United Kingdom
In the Dusk	Sutemose	Šarūnas Bartas	Lithuania; France; Czech Republic; Serbia; Portugal; Letonia
Wuhai	乌海	Zhou Ziyang	China

Out of competition

The following works were selected to screen out of competition:

English title	Original title	Director(s)	Production countrie(s)
Rifkin's Festival		Woody Allen	Spain; United States; Italy
Forgotten We'll Be	El olvido que seremos	Fernando Trueba	Colombia
Coven	Akelarre	Pablo Agüero	Spain; France; Argentina
Riot Police (miniseries)	Antidisturbios	Rodrigo Sorogoyen	Spain
Special Screenings
The Great Fellove	El gran Fellove	Matt Dillon	Mexico; Cuba; United States
Patria (miniseries)		Aitor Gabilondo	Spain
We Are Who We Are (miniseries)		Luca Guadagnino	Italy

=== Latin Horizons ===
The following films were selected for the Latin Horizons section:

Highlighted title indicates award winner.

English title	Original title	Director(s)	Production countrie(s)
The Intruder	El prófugo	Natalia Meta	Argentina; Mexico
Unlimited Edition	Edición ilimitada	Edgardo Cozarinsky, Santiago Loza, Virginia Cosin, Romina Paula	Argentina
La Verónica		Leonardo Medel	Chile
One in a Thousand	Las mil y una	Clarisa Navas	Argentina; Germany
Mum, Mum, Mum	Mamá, mamá, mamá	Sol Berruezo Pichon-Rivière	Argentina
Tragic Jungle	Selva trágica	Yulene Olaizola	Mexico; France; Colombia
Identifying Features	Sin señales particulares	Fernanda Valadez	Mexico; Spain
All the Dead Ones	Todos os mortos	Caetano Gotardo, Marco Dutra	Brazil; France
Night Shot	Visión nocturna	Carolina Moscoso	Chile

=== New Directors ===
The following films were selected for the New Directors section:

Highlighted title indicates award winner.

English title	Original title	Director(s)	Production countrie(s)
Spring Blossom	16 printemps	Suzanne Lindon	France
Ane Is Missing	Ane	David Pérez Sañudo	Spain
Memory House	Casa de antiguidades	João Paulo Miranda Maria	Brazil; France
Chupacabra		Grigory Kolomytsev	Russia
Gull	Gal-mae-gi / 갈매기	Kim Mi-jo	South Korea
Slow Singing	Gē shēng yuán hé màn bàn pāi	Dong Xingyi	China
Death Knell	Hil kanpaiak	Imanol Rayo	Spain
I Never Cry	Jak najdalej stąd	Piotr Domalewski	Poland; Ireland
Last Days of Spring	La última primavera	Isabel Lamberti	Spain; Netherlands
Limbo		Ben Sharrock	United Kingdom
Spagat / Grand Écart	Spagat	Christian Johannes Koch	Switzerland
Along the Sea	Umibe no kanojotachi / 海辺の彼女たち	Akio Fujimoto	Japan; Vietnam

=== Zabaltegi-Tabakalera ===
The following films were selected for the Zabaltegi-Tabakalera section:

Highlighted title indicates award winner.

English title	Original title	Director(s)	Production countrie(s)
The Metamorphosis of Birds	A metamorfose dos pássaros	Catarina Vasconcelos	Portugal
Autofiction	Autoficción	Laida Lertxundi	United States; Spain; New Zealand
Cold Meridian		Peter Strickland	Hungary; United Kingdom
Correspondence	Correspondencia	Carla Simón, Dominga Sotomayor	Spain; Chile
The Woman Who Ran	Domangchin yeoja / 도망친 여자	Hong Sang-soo	South Korea
Dustin		Naïla Guiguet	France
Fauna		Nicolás Pereda	Canada; Mexico
Having a Good Time	Huan Le Shi Guang	Bell Zhong	China
I Am Afraid to Forget Your Face		Sameh Alaa	Egypt; France; Belgium; Qatar
The Salt of Tears	Le Sel des larmes	Philippe Garrel	France; Switzerland
Los conductos		Camilo Restrepo	France; Colombia; Brazil
Perpetual Night	Noche perpetua	Pedro Peralta	Portugal; France
The Calming	Ping jing	Song Fang	China
Days	Rìzi / 日子	Tsai Ming-liang	Taiwan
Simon Calls	Simon chama	Marta Sousa Ribeiro	Portugal
Stephanie		Leonardo Van Dijl	Belgium
The Trouble with Being Born		Sandra Wollner	Austria
An Optical Illusion	Un efecto óptico	Juan Cavestany	Spain
Ya no duermo		Marina Palacio	Spain
Yellow Cat	Zheltaya koshka	Adilkhan Yerzhanov	Kazakhstan; France

=== Surprise film ===
The following film was programmed as a surprise:

English title	Original title	Director(s)	Production countrie(s)
Sportin' Life		Abel Ferrara	Italy; France; United Kingdom

== Official Selection Awards ==
- Golden Shell: Beginning by Dea Kulumbegashvili
- Special Jury Prize: Crock of Gold: A Few Rounds with Shane MacGowan by Julien Temple
- Silver Shell for Best Director: Dea Kulumbegashvili (Beginning)
- Silver Shell for Best Actress: Ia Sukhitashvili (Beginning)
- Silver Shell for Best Actor: Mads Mikkelsen, Thomas Bo Larsen, Magnus Millang, Lars Ranthe (Another Round)
- Best Screenplay: Dea Kulumbegashvili and Rati Oneli (Beginning)
- Best Cinematography: Yuta Tsukinaga (Any Crybabies Around?)
