= Itziar Castro =

Spanish actress (1977–2023)

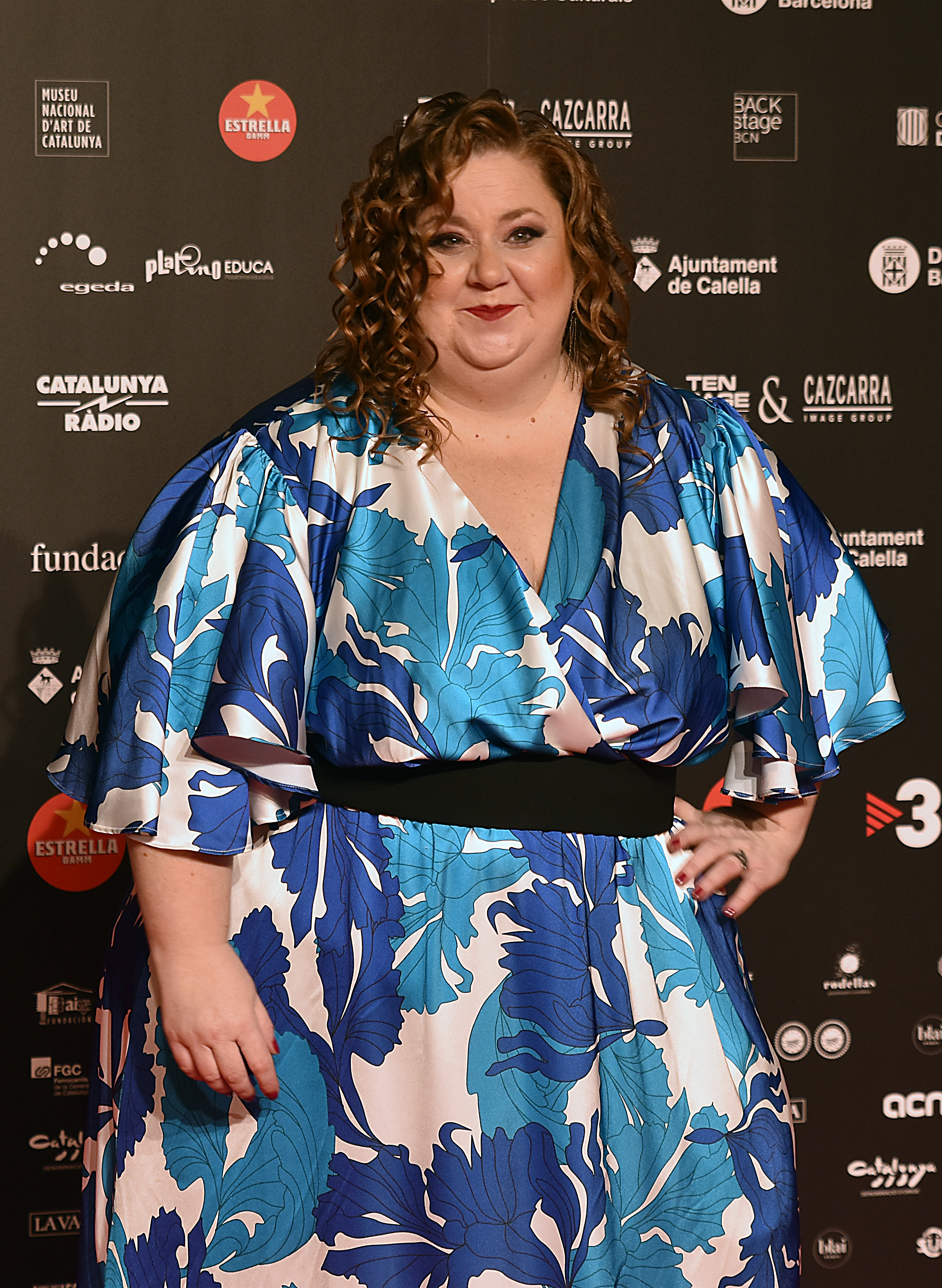
- Castro at the 2022 Gaudí Awards
- Born: Itziar Castro i Rivadulla; 14 February 1977; Barcelona, Spain
- Died: 8 December 2023 (aged 46); Lloret de Mar, Spain
- Occupation: Actress
- Years active: 2002–2023

Itziar Castro i Rivadulla (14 February 1977 – 8 December 2023) was a Spanish actress known mainly for her role as Gоya Fernández in Locked Up and participating in films such as Champions or Skins, for which she was nominated to the Goya Award for Best New Actress.

== Early life ==
Itziar Castro i Rivadulla was born in Barcelona on 14 February 1977.

== Career ==
Her professional career dates back to 2002, when she participated in the feature film Noche de fiesta. She landed her first role in a feature film in Unconscious (2003). Later, she participated in fictional roles for both television and cinema, including in El cor de la ciutat or Algo que celebrar on television and in Blancanieves or La sexta alumna in cinema. In 2017, she signed for the main cast of Eduardo Casanova's film Skins, for which she was nominated for a Goya Award for Best New Actress and won the Actors and Actresses Union award in the same category.

In 2018, she was part of the main cast of the television series Locked Up in the role of Goya Fernández, which earned her notoriety. In addition, she participates in the feature films Matar a Dios and Campeones, and made a cameo in the second season of Paquita Salas, portraying the stage manager of the Tarazona Festival. In July 2018, she signed on to play the acting teacher of the academy of Operación Triunfo 2018, replacing Javier Ambrossi and Javier Calvo. On October 31, just over a month after the edition started, it was learned that the actress was leaving her job in the program, apparently a decision taken unilaterally by the program's management.

In 2019, she participated in the feature films El cerro de los dioses by Daniel M. Caneiro and ¿Qué te juegas? by Inés de León. In 2020, she made a cameo in Woody Allen's film Rifkin's Festival and starred in the Fox España series Vis a vis: El Oasis, as well as having a recurring role in the HBO Spain series One Way or Another as Choni. She is also one of the protagonists of Historias lamentables, a film by Javier Fesser for Amazon Prime Video. In December 2020, her signing was announced as the main character for the first Netflix musical series in Spain Once Upon a Time... Happily Never After directed by Manolo Caro.

== Death ==
Castro died shortly after experiencing cardiorespiratory arrest at 2:00 a.m. on 8 December 2023, aged 46, in a municipal swimming pool of Lloret de Mar while rehearsing for a synchronised swimming performance.

== Filmography ==
=== Film ===
==== Feature films ====
Year	Title	Character	Directed by	Ref.
2002	Noche de fiesta	Extra	Xavi Puebla	
2004	Inconscientes	Wet nurse	Joaquín Oristrell	
2004	Las maletas de Tulse Luper 3	Frances Cotumely	Peter Greenaway	
2008	Pretextos	Nurse	Sílvia Munt	
2008	Sing for Darfur	Woman	Johan Kramer	
2010	The Great Vazquez	Wi-fi saleslady	Óscar Aibar	
2011	Águila Roja: la película	Maid	José Ramón Ayerra	
2012	Rec 3: Génesis	Lady with Pamela	Paco Plaza	
2012	Blancanieves	Tocinillo de cielo	Pablo Berger	
2013	Las brujas de Zugarramurdi	3D witch	Álex de la Iglesia	
2015	Transeúntes	Woman	Luis Aller	
2016	La sexta alumna	Anita	Benja de la Rosa	
2017	Pieles (Skins)	Itziar	Eduardo Casanova	
2017	Matar a Dios	Ana	Caye Casas and Albert Pintó	
2018	Campeones	Jesus's mother	Javier Fesser	
2018	Escape from Marwin	Ben's sister	Jordi Castejón	
2019	El cerro de los dioses	Herself	Daniel M. Caneiro	
2019	¿Qué te juegas?	Rosita	Inés de León	
2020	Rifkin's Festival	Woman in the garden	Woody Allen	
2020	Asylum: Twisted Horror and Fantasy Tales	Wife	Carlos Goitia	
2020	Historias lamentables	Ingrid Müller	Javier Fesser	
2021	¡A todo tren! Destino Asturias	Asturian farmgirl	Santiago Segura	
2022	La mesita del comedor	Super friend	Caye Casas	
2024	Lo carga el diablo	Señora Bermúdez		

==== Short films ====
- Los Bermejo (Dir. José Fernández-Ark, 2018), secondary role.
- Desaliento (Dir. Pinky Alonso, 2018), leading role.
- RIP (Dir. Caye Casas and Albert Pintó, 2017), leading role.
- Eat my shit (Dir. Eduardo Casanova, 2015), leading role.
- La Colleja (Dir. Sergio Morcillo, 2019), leading role.

=== Television ===
==== Series ====
Year	Title	Cadena	Character	Duration	Ref.
2004	El cor de la ciutat	TV3	Sandra Pi	1 episode	
2005	Hospital Central	Telecinco	Sara	1 episode	
2006–08	El cor de la ciutat	TV3	Bea Billars	Secondary role	
2007	Rumors	Canal Nou	Secretary	Television movie	
2009	Otra ciudad	Canal Nou	Wig shop keeper	Television movie	
2009	Xadom	Vimeo	Marta	1 episode	
2015	Algo que celebrar	Antena 3	Louise	2 episodes	
2017	Laia	TV3	Lame woman	Television movie	
2017	El crac	TV3	Miriam Espinguet	1 episode	
2018	Paquita Salas	Netflix	Awards councillor	1 episode	
2018–19	Vis a vis (Locked Up)	FOX España	Goya Fernández	Introduced in season 3	
2019	Terror y feria	Flooxer	Montse		
2019	Vida perfecta	Movistar+	Nurse	1 episode	
2020	Vis a vis: El Oasis	FOX España	Goya Fernández	8 episodes	
2020	Válidas	Flooxer	Lawyer	1 episode	
2020	Benidorm	Antena 3	Hotel client	1 episode	
2020	Por H o por B (One Way or Another)	HBO España	Choni		
2022	Érase una vez... pero ya no (Once Upon a Time... Happily Never After)	Netflix	Eloísa / Candela		

==== Programs ====
Year	Title	Cadena	Role
2018	Operación Triunfo	TVE	Teacher
2019	Todo es mentira	Cuatro	Collaborator
2019	Viajando con Chester	Cuatro	Guest

== Accolades ==
Year	Award	Category	Work	Result	Ref.
2018	32nd Goya Awards	Best New Actress	Skins	Nominated	
2018	27th Actors and Actresses Union Awards	Best New Actress	Skins	Won	
2018	2nd Fugaz Awards	Best Actress	RIP	Nominated	
