= Ellipsis (film) =

- Film poster
- Spanish: Puntos suspensivos
- Directed by: David Marqués
- Written by: Rafael Calatayud Cano; David Marqués
- Produced by: Álvaro Longoria
- Starring: Diego Peretti; José Coronado; Cecilia Suárez; Georgina Amorós
- Cinematography: Santiago Racaj
- Edited by: Raúl de Torres
- Music by: Óscar López Plaza
- Production company: Morena Films
- Distributed by: Vértice 360
- Release dates: 2 March 2024 (Málaga); 20 September 2024 (Spain)
- Country: Spain
- Language: Spanish

Ellipsis (Spanish: Puntos suspensivos) is a 2024 Spanish mystery thriller film directed by David Marqués and written by Rafael Calatayud Cano and Marqués starring Diego Peretti, José Coronado, Cecilia Suárez, and Georgina Amorós.

== Plot ==
Retired in an isolate house, mystery novel writer Leo is upended by the visit of mysterious man and self-proclaimed journalist Jota, with the backdrop of a secret seemingly connected to Leo's lover Adriana.

== Cast ==
- Diego Peretti as Leo
- José Coronado as Jota
- Cecilia Suárez as Victoria
- Georgina Amorós as Adriana

== Production ==
The screenplay was penned by David Marqués and Rafa Calatayud, with the film being described by its makers as in following the vein of Sleuth, Les Diaboliques, and Witness for the Prosecution. The film was produced by Morena Films, with backing from Prime Video and RTVE and funding from Junta de Extremadura. Shooting took place in Valdecañas, lasting from December 2022 to January 2023.

== Release ==
The film premiered on 2 March 2024 at the 27th Málaga Film Festival. It was released theatrically in Spain on 20 September 2024 by Vértice 360. Filmax boarded international sales rights. It was selected as the closing film of the 39th Mar del Plata International Film Festival.

== Reception ==
Miguel Ángel Romero of Cinemanía rated the film 3½ out of 5 stars, deeming it to be an "intimate, low-budget work" [...] "that demonstrates how well a story can work with very few elements".

Jesús Palacios of Fotogramas rated the film 4 out of 5 stars, highlighting the acting duel between Peretti and Coronado as the best thing about the film.

Manuel J. Lombardo of Diario de Sevilla gave the film 3 stars, writing that the murder mystery film has the foundations of "a screenplay as cheating as it is effective, and one of those high level acting duels, later turned into a triangle".

== Accolades ==
Year	Award	Category	Nominee(s)	Result	Ref.
2024	42nd Brussels International Fantastic Film Festival	Black Raven		Won	

== See also ==
- List of Spanish films of 2024
