= A Hipster in Rural Spain =

- Original title: Un hipster en la España vacía
- Directed by: Emilio Martínez Lázaro
- Screenplay by: Daniel Castro
- Based on: Un hipster en la España vacía by Daniel Gascón
- Produced by: Gonzalo Salazar-Simpson
- Starring: Paco León; Macarena García; Lalo Tenorio; Berta Vázquez
- Cinematography: Juan Molina
- Edited by: Ángel H. Zoido
- Music by: Roque Baños
- Production company: LaZona
- Distributed by: Amazon Prime Video
- Release dates: 2 March 2024 (Málaga); 27 March 2024 (Spain)
- Country: Spain
- Language: Spanish

A Hipster in Rural Spain (Spanish: Un hipster en la España vacía) is a 2024 comedy film directed by Emilio Martínez Lázaro, with a screenplay by Daniel Castro based on the satirical book by Daniel Gascón. It stars Lalo Tenorio, Berta Vázquez, Macarena García, and Paco León.

== Plot ==
Naïve political activist Quique is sent from the city to a small village in the province of Teruel by his party leader to develop some workshops and sustainable crops as a part of a ruse so the leader could secretly spend time with Quique's girlfriend Lina. Quique initially finds little to no acceptance to his modern political agenda among the reluctant rural folks, with only tavern keeper Lourdes offering him some help.

== Cast ==
- Lalo Tenorio as Quique
- Berta Vázquez as Lourdes
- Paco León
- Macarena García
- Tito Valverde
- Miguel Rellán
- Marta Fernández Muro
- Juana Cordero
- Manuel Manquiña
- Rober Bodegas
- Lucía Díez

== Production ==
The film is a LaZona production, with Gonzalo Salazar-Simpson taking over production duties. Shooting primarily took place in Fuentespalda, province of Teruel.

== Release ==
The film was presented at the 27th Málaga Film Festival on 2 March 2024. It was released on Amazon Prime Video on 27 March 2024.

== Reception ==
Cynthia Serna Box of Infobae assessed that "everything in Martínez-Lázaro's feature film is outdated: its premise, the performances and even the love story between Tenorio and Vázquez".

Raquel Hernández Luján of HobbyConsolas rated the film with 45 points ('bad'), considering that the comedy film "leaves much to be desired", negatively mentioning the "rather lazy" writing, the lack of chemistry, the absence of internal tempo in the narrative, and [the] few laughs.

Irene Crespo of Cinemanía rated the film 2½ out of 5 stars, deeming it to be "a formulaic and industry comedy that manages to find some good gag".

== See also ==
- List of Spanish films of 2024
