= Dafne and the Rest =

TV spanish series

- Spanish: Todo lo otro
- Genre: Comedy drama
- Created by: Abril Zamora
- Screenplay by: Abril Zamora
- Directed by: Abril Zamora
- Starring: Abril Zamora; Juan Blanco; David Matarín; Nuria Herrero; Andrea Guasch; María Maroto; Bea de la Cruz; Marta Belenguer; Pepe Lorente; Raúl Mérida; Miguel Bernardeau; Alberto Casado
- Country of origin: Spain
- Original language: Spanish
- No. of seasons: 1
- No. of episodes: 8

Production
- Executive producers: Miguel Salvat; Steve Matthews; Antony Root; Santi Botello
- Running time: c. 30 min
- Production companies: Producciones Mandarina; Campanilla Films S.L.

Original release
- Network: HBO Max
- Release: 26 October 2021

Dafne and the Rest (Spanish: Todo lo otro; lit. 'Everything else') is a Spanish television series created, written, directed and starred by Abril Zamora for HBO Max. It is one of the first Spanish original titles of the HBO Max catalogue, which debuted in Europe on 26 October 2021.

== Premise ==
The show (a dramedy) follows Dafne, a young transgender woman with a precarious job who has just left a relationship. She lives her life day by day all while discovering she has unrequited feelings for her best friend. It takes place in Madrid.

== Cast ==
- Abril Zamora as Dafne
- Juan Blanco as César
- David Matarín as Yerai
- Nuria Herrero as Amaya
- Andrea Guasch as Martina
- María Maroto as Eva
- Bea de la Cruz as Raquel
- Marta Belenguer as Aurora
- Pepe Lorente as Juancho
- Raúl Mérida as Manuel
- Miguel Bernardeau as Iñaki
- Alberto Casado

== Production and release ==
Created, written and directed by Abril Zamora, the series was produced by Producciones Mandarina (via its subsidiary Campanilla Films S.L.) for Warner Media. It consists of 8 episodes featuring an average running time of 30 minutes. Miguel Salvat, Steve Matthews and Antony Root were credited as executive producers on behalf of WarnerMedia whereas Santi Botello was credited on behalf of Campanilla Films. Shooting wrapped in Madrid towards May 2021. The series was originally intended to be a HBO Europe original, but following the preparation for the HBO Max rollout in selected European countries in the Fall of 2021, it was ensuingly branded as a HBO Max original. The first teaser trailer was released on 13 September 2021. The series was presented together with other HBO Max originals (Venga Juan, Sin novedad and ¡García!) at the 69th San Sebastián Film Festival in September 2021.
