= Welcome to the Family (2018 TV series) =

2018 Catalan-language television series

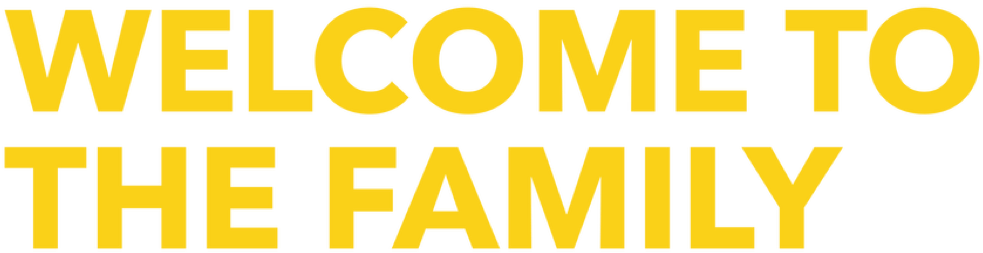
- Genre: Dark comedy Dramedy
- Created by: Pau Freixas; Ivan Mercadé
- Starring: Melani Olivares; Iván Massagué; Yolanda Ramos; Nao Albet; Georgina Amorós
- Country of origin: Spain
- Original language: Catalan
- No. of seasons: 2
- No. of episodes: 26

Production
- Producer: Televisió de Catalunya
- Production companies: Arca Audiovisual; Televisió de Catalunya (TV3)

Original release
- Network: TV3
- Release: 22 January 2018 – 2019

Welcome to the Family (Catalan: Benvinguts a la família) is a Catalan-language dramedy television series that ran from 2018 to 2019, created by Pau Freixas and Iván Mercadé. Based around a dysfunctional mixed family, it stars Melani Olivares, Iván Massagué, Yolanda Ramos, Nao Albet, Georgina Amorós, Leïti Sène and Nonna Cardoner.

The first season premiered on Catalan broadcaster TV3 on 22 January 2018. The second and final season premiered on the same channel on 14 January 2019, ending in April that year. The first season is also available to stream on Netflix.

Reviews criticised the show's tone of comedy and characterisation, but gave praise to certain performances. Within Spain, Ramos's character Victòria became particularly popular; she won a Best Actress award for the role.

== Synopsis ==
Trying to organise her mixed family, single mother Àngela (Olivares) gets notice that they are being evicted because of her ex's unpaid debts against the home. She must turn to her wealthy father Eduardo (Simón Andreu), who kicked her out as a teenager, for help. However, Eduardo soon dies, having left both Àngela's family and his new wife out of his will. In the second season, Àngela's absent ex-husband appears, bringing his own family trouble.

== Cast ==
Per the official website.

- Melani Olivares as Àngela Navarro
- Iván Massagué as Nando García
- Yolanda Ramos as Victòria Argente
- Nao Albet as Fran García
- Georgina Amorós as Àlex Argente
- Leïti Sène as David García
- Nonna Cardoner as Sara García
- Lluís Villanueva as Raül Dorado
- Betsy Túrnez as Adela
- Miquel Fernández as Miquel Isturiz
- Francesc Ferrer as Pere
- Simón Andreu as Eduardo Navarro
- Santi Millán as Manu García
- Paula Malia as Teresa
- Jaume Madaula as Nil
- Anna Gras as Ayla
- Mercè Arànega as Blanca "La mama" Giralt
- Antonio Dechent as Ramon "Falcó" Diaz
- Joan Carreras as Marcos Navarro
- Àlex Maruny as Dídac
- Eva Santolaria as Lili
- Aina Clotet as Lola
- Quim Pla as Leo
- Carme Sansa as Berta

== Production ==
=== Development and themes ===
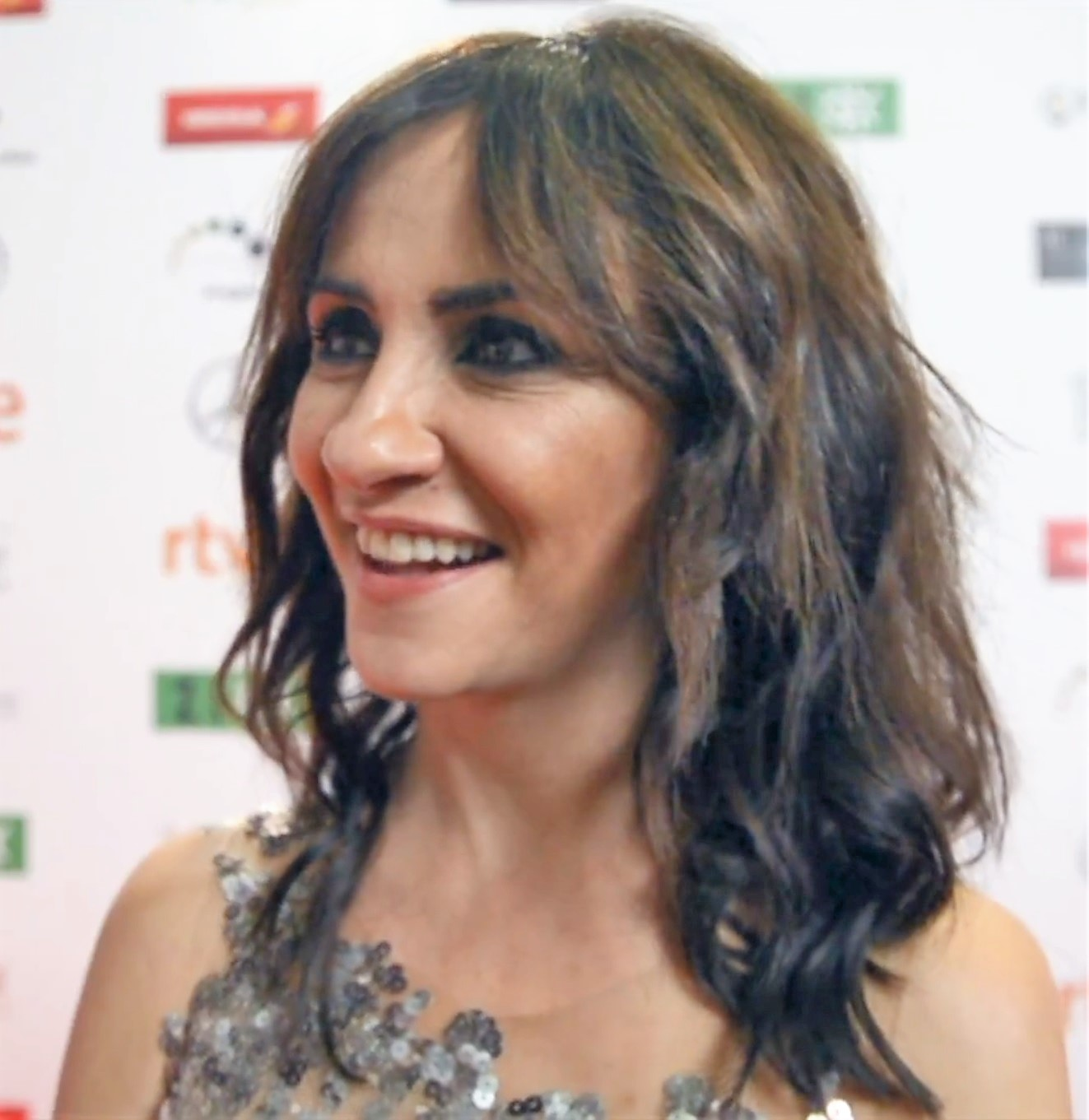
Melani Olivares, who plays Àngela, in 2016

Before creating the show, Pau Freixas and Ivan Mercadé had worked on Polseres vermelles and Sé quién eres together, the latter a thriller. They then chose to do black comedy in the form of the dysfunctional family drama, with Freixas saying that "the series explains how there is an emotional bond between the characters that is indestructible, despite the fact that they argue", with Mercadé adding that they wanted the show to represent how the only thing needed for parenting is love.

Freixas has said that a hard part of developing the first season was getting the tone right, saying that "it was difficult [...] to find a direct reference" for it. In anticipation of the premiere of the second season, Freixas also said that this season had been difficult to create. Speaking at a network event, he said that there is a hard-to-achieve balance with having a new season "evolve and avoid repeating itself in certain aspects, except for those that have worked well", but added that he felt the challenge had been more easily overcome because the show knew its tone and the actors were by then familiar with their characters. In addition to this, after the character of Victòria became popular in season one, she was given more comedy but also more storyline and background in season two.

Tomàs Delclós writes that the show is focussed by strong female figures, who each are the heads of unconventional families in a matriarchal role.

It was announced that the show would not continue a week after the final episode of season two aired. Freixas had originally said that he wanted "about" three seasons in the show, and told Ara that this would be "the perfect duration". After being a success in Catalonia, Netflix bought distribution rights for the first season, but did not pick up the second season, which had not performed as well; Ara wrote that original network TV3 had to absorb all production costs because of this, and may have found it too expensive to continue. After Welcome to the Family, Freixas created a three-part Spanish period family dramedy as a Netflix original for Christmas 2019, and actors Georgina Amorós and Leïti Sène were added to the cast of Netflix's Spanish-language original Élite.

=== Casting and characterisation ===
In an interview, Melani Olivares said that the show was the first work that she had done in Catalan, though she is from Barcelona; she says she was never given the opportunity before. The season one cast list was released while the show was filming, with the cast for season two being announced shortly before it was broadcast.

Within Spain, Victòria was a popular character in season one, with memorable speech. For season two, the character was made bigger by giving her more comedic moments. Sergio Navarro wrote that this didn't spoil the effect, but "takes the power and multiplies it", saying that the character becomes more "exaggerated, dramatic and whining," to the effect of making all her lines and actions humorous.

Some of the season two cast, Santi Millán and Paula Malia, were sought by the creators and hired "because they have a very Welcome to the Family spirit". Malia spoke about her casting, saying that she felt welcomed to the production and was happy to be back with the Catalan network.

=== Filming ===
It was filmed in Sant Pere de Vilamajor of Vallès Oriental, and finished recording of the first season on 20 December 2017. Olivares and Ramos have said that the filming conditions were hard, but made worth it by the good environment on set.

== Broadcast ==
Welcome to the Family began showing on 22 January 2018 on Catalan channel TV3. It replaced Merlí in its slot on the network when this show ended. The second season started on 14 January 2019, and finished airing on TV3 in April 2019. Though Netflix bought distribution rights for the first season, it did not buy the second season. The first season was released on Netflix worldwide on 27 July 2018, having 13 episodes of 52 minutes.

The first episode of the show was the most-watched premiere on TV3 in over ten years, being viewed by 794,000 people for a 25.1% share of the TV audience in its time slot – it notably received over 100,000 more viewers than the series finale of Merlí a week before, which had also been that show's most-watched episode. The first season had an average of 483,000 viewers and a 16.5% share per episode, with all episodes having over 350,000 viewers; the second season's viewing figures were not as high, premiering at 470,000 viewers and a 17.8% share, averaging 365,000 viewers and a 13.2% share per episode. Ara reports that this is below-average for this slot in general, with the last two episodes having less than 300,000 viewers.

== Reception ==
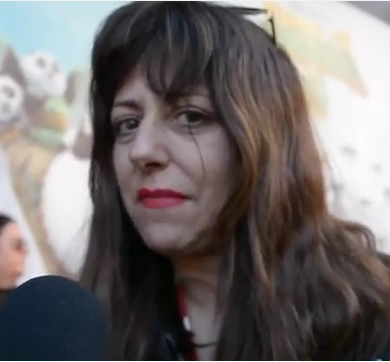
Yolanda Ramos was seen as a star of the show, winning a Best Actress award for her role

=== Critical response ===
Ramos has described the show as more of an American style than Catalan or Spanish. It has also been described as "between Modern Family, Weeds and Shameless." Writing for The Daily Dot, Kahron Spearman says that the first season is "occasionally tedious" but "ultimately heartening". In his review of the first episode, Sorokach says that it has a "Weekend at Bernie's vibe". The character of Raül Dorado has been likened to Saul Goodman of Breaking Bad and Better Call Saul.

Spearman congratulates Netflix for picking up the show as it contributes to "telling international stories from places Americans don't consider"; Jonathon Wilson of Ready Steady Cut says that it is "another solid piece of overseas programming" to be picked up by Netflix, giving it 3.5 out of 5 stars. However, both Spearman and Wilson suggest that the characters do not get a lot of depth. Spearman acknowledges that despite this, the characters are very diverse, though also finds the shift in the middle of the season trying to add more depth to be unsuccessful. Both Spearman and Wilson also note that the different tones of dark comedy and awkward teenage gags in the show do not work well together. Both reviewers, and Josh Sorokach of Decider, give positive notes to how the show steps outside what a normal family is defined as.

Reviewing for the Argentine newspaper Clarín, Pablo Raimondi is critical of the show. He suggests that Netflix picked it up after Merlí became popular on the streaming service, but that it will not repeat that success. Raimondi says that the main characters overact, the rest of the characters are caricatures, and that there are too many coincidences.

The show has been placed within a context of the Catalan independence movement, and the 2017 declaration of independence and its aftermath in particular. Wilson writes that while using eviction as the story starter is not original, it feels regionally appropriate due to unrest in Catalonia at the time the show was set. Rebecca Patton for Bustle begins her review with a paragraph outlining the situation in Catalonia at the time, though says "it's unclear from the trailer whether [the show] will touch on all of this political unrest".

Wilson criticises the lack of originality in Àngela's character, and that the actors playing her sons are visibly too old to pass as her children; he describes Ivan Massagué's Nando as an "unofficial David Spade stand-in", while Sorokach writes that "in terms of a sleeper star, Georgina Amorós' Alex, the spirited teenage daughter of Victoria, is a tour de force" for her unique energy, wit, and one-liners. Raimondi gives rare praise in his review to Nao Albet, saying that "only a few one-liners from the analytical Fran [...] stand out among the cast". In Catalonia's leading newspaper, La Vanguardia, Francesc Puig affirms that Yolanda Ramos' Victòria is the scene stealer through both seasons, which he says is "in part because of her mixing of Catalan and Spanish".

The director of the TV3 network, Vicent Sanchis, says that the show is different in that it captured an audience of young people who do not usually watch traditional television, which he believes was due to its dark humour, and added that this contributed to its overall success.

The dubbing of the show has been strongly criticised. For the English version, Wilson writes that "[u]nless you're militantly opposed to reading your television, subtitles are the route you should take", with Raimondi noting in his negative review that "the dub in Spanish doesn't help". In 2019, James Tapper for The Observer suggested that, with subtitle augmentation, the show could be used to help learn the Catalan language.

Reviewing season two for El País, Delclós suggests that the necessary suspension of disbelief is harder to cover up with comedy, and worries that the more dramatic story elements are "hard tests" for the show's "cast of comedians".

=== Awards and nominations ===
The show was nominated for two awards at the 2018 Zapping Awards: Best Fiction Series and Best Actress for Yolanda Ramos; Ramos won.

== Sources ==
- Álvarez, Inés (13 January 2019). "'Benvinguts a la família' se supera a sí misma" ['Benvinguts a la família' outdoes itself]. El Periódico (in Spanish).
- Ara (23 January 2018). "Èxit incontestable de 'Benvinguts a la família', que frega els 800.000 espectadors" [Undisputed success of 'Welcome to the Family', which attracts 800,000 viewers] (in Catalan).
- Castellví, Albert (25 April 2019). "TV3 dona per acabada 'Benvinguts a la família'" [TV3 is finished with 'Welcome to the Family']. Ara.cat (in Catalan).
- Delclós, Tomàs (7 February 2019). "'Benvinguts a la família': manen les dones" ['Welcome to the Family': send in the women]. El País (in Catalan).
- Marta (7 February 2019). "Yolanda Ramos gana el Premio Zapping 2018 a la Mejor Actriz" [Yolanda Ramos wins the 2018 Zapping Award for Best Actress]. Promotora 600 (in Spanish).
- Martín, Eduardo (15 January 2019). "8 razones para ver 'Benvinguts a la família', la comedia estrella de TV3 y Netflix" [8 Reasons to Watch 'Welcome to the Family', the star comedy of TV3 and Netflix]. eCartelera (in Spanish).
- Mayorga, Emilio (6 December 2019). "Pau Freixas on Netflix Spanish Miniseries 'Days of Christmas'". Variety.
- Navarro, Sergio (14 January 2019). "Crítica de 'Benvinguts a la família' (T2): Otro relato (salvaje) que mantiene su esencia bañada en humor negro" [Review of 'Benvinguts a la Familia' (S2): Another (wild) story that keeps its essence bathed in black humor]. Formula TV (in Spanish).
- Palés, Alejandra (30 November 2017). "TV3 aborda amb humor negre els problemes d'una família singular" [TV3 humorously addresses the problems of a unique family]. Ara.cat (in Catalan).
- Patton, Rebecca (27 July 2018). "Will 'Welcome To The Family' Return For Season 2 On Netflix? This Catalan Series Is A Dramedy With An Edgy Twist". Bustle.
- Patton, Rebecca (6 September 2019). "Who Plays Cayetana In 'Elite' Season 2? Georgina Amorós Has Worked With One Of Her Costars Before". Bustle.
- Puig, Francesc (14 January 2019). "'Benvinguts a la família' vuelve, ahora, con los problemas del padre" ['Benvinguts a la família' returns, now with daddy issues]. La Vanguardia (in Spanish).
- Raimondi, Pablo (29 July 2018). "'Bienvenidos a la familia': una comedia catalana sin gracia" ['Welcome to the Family': a Catalan comedy without grace]. Clarín (in Spanish).
- Sorokach, Josh (27 July 2018). "Stream It Or Skip It: 'Welcome To The Family' On Netflix, A Dysfunctional Family Comedy That's Both Dark And Heartwarming". Decider.
- Spearman, Kahron (29 July 2018). "Catalan dramedy 'Welcome to the Family' is a worthy Netflix binge". The Daily Dot.
- Tapper, James (2 March 2019). "No habla español? How Netflix could transform the way we learn languages". The Observer.
- TV3 (2018). "Benvinguts a la família: Els personatges" [Welcome to the Family: The characters] (in Catalan).
- UPI (4 October 2019). "Netflix Renews Spanish Teen Drama 'Elite' — Meet Season 3's Cast Additions". TV Insider.
- Wilson, Jonathon (27 July 2018). "'Welcome to the Family' Season 1 – Netflix TV Review". Ready Steady Cut.
