= Abril Zamora =

Spanish actress

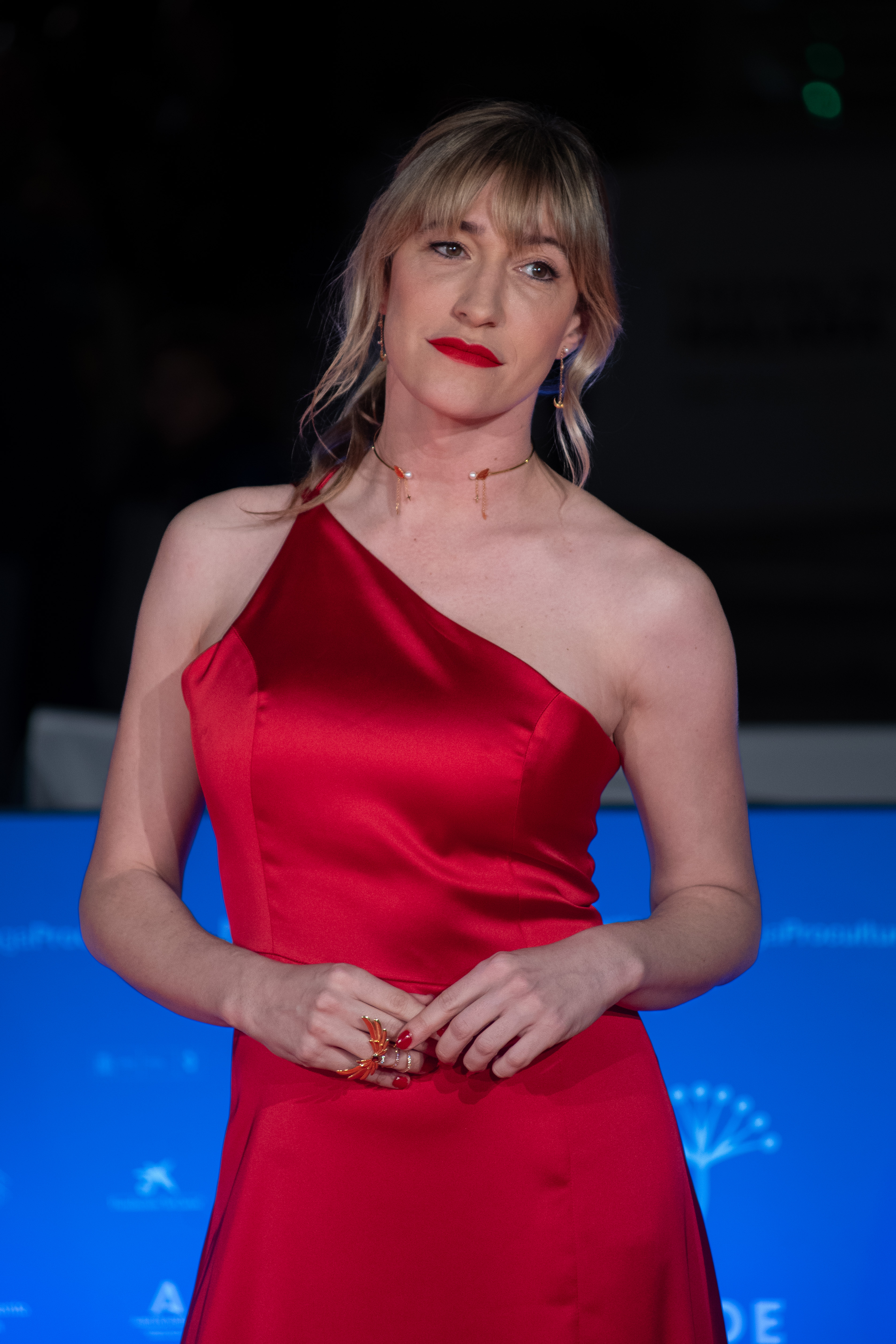
- Zamora in 2024
- Born: 11 November 1981 (age 44); Cerdanyola del Vallès, Catalonia, Spain
- Occupation: Actress
- Years active: 2004–present

Abril Zamora Peláez (born 11 November 1981) is a Spanish actress, screenwriter, and director with a long career in film, television, and theater. She rose to prominence as Luna in the FOX Spain television series Vis a Vis, which gave visibility to the LGBT+ reality through fiction.

== Biography ==
Abril Zamora Peláez was born in Cerdanyola del Vallès, Barcelona on 11 November 1981. She made her gender transition visible through her personal social networks, and since then she has demanded both greater diversity in characters and more opportunities for the transgender community in the audiovisual media. However, for her, it is also important to speak openly about her past, of which she is also proud. In 2018, she participated in the documentary directed by Fernando González Molina The Best Day of My Life, which shows six LGBT people who gather in Madrid for the celebration of International LGBT Pride Day and who dare to live as they are with pride, joy, and commitment. She also stated that she always knew she was a girl but did not identify with the trans label because gender does not really define her.

== Career path ==
She started acting when she was a teenager, playing King Arthur in a school play, Merlín el encantador. Together with Sergio Caballero, she set up the theater company Oscura Teatre, with which she made the plays El congelador (2008), La indiferencia de los armadillos (2009), and Todas muertas (2010), all three with text by Zamora. In 2014, she premiered the play Yernos que aman, a tragicomic choral story that she performed for four seasons at La Pensión de Las Pulgas in Madrid, directed by herself and in which she played one of the characters. In acting, she has played small roles in the television series Los Serrano (2007), Los hombres de Paco (2008), Hospital central (2009), La que se avecina (2014) and Anclados (2015). In addition to starring in the film Marica tú directed by Ismael Núñez and broadcast on Flooxer.

In April 2017, she began her transition, and it was then when she was offered a small role in the series Vis a vis, playing a girl with drug problems in a sequence; but on the test, she liked the team, and that nameless character grew and became Luna during the third and fourth seasons of the series. With this role, she gained more popularity and got a nomination for Best Newcomer Actress at the Actors and Actresses Union Awards.

In 2019, she created a series for Telecinco called Señoras del (h)AMPA, for which she was also director and screenwriter during its two seasons and which revolves around a group of mothers of an AMPA who kill a person by mistake. The same year, she joined the screenwriting team of the Netflix series Élite. She also participated in the film ¿A quién te llevarías a una isla desierta? by Jota Linares and, a year later, in the Italian film The Life Ahead, where she shared the screen with Sophia Loren. She also had a supporting role in the Netflix original series El desorden que dejas, where she played Tere, the best friend of Inma Cuesta's character. Her next project was as creator, director, and actress in the HBO Max series Todo lo otro, which premiered in October 2021 and tells the story of a group of friends in their thirties and the various issues that affect them.

== Filmography ==
=== As director and screenwriter ===
Year	Series	Channel	Role
2016	Temporada baja	Flooxer	Directora y guionista
2018 - 2021	Señoras del (h)AMPA	Telecinco	Creadora, directora y guionista
2019	Élite	Netflix	Guionista de la segunda temporada (2 episodes)
2019 - 2021	Indetectables	Flooxer	Directora y guionista (2 episodes)
2021	Todo lo otro	HBO Max	Creadora, directora y guionista

=== As an actress ===
==== Cinema ====
Year	Film	Character	Directed by
2006	El perfume: Historia de un asesino	Chico	Tom Tykwer
2006	Todo mal	Tommy	Francesc Giró
2009	Tres días con la familia	Pere Jr.	Mar Coll
2013	Caídos	Nacho	Jaime Herrero
2016	Marica tú	Julián	Ismael Núñez
2019	¿A quién te llevarías a una isla desierta?	Abril	Jota Linares
2020	The Life Ahead	Lola	Edoardo Ponti
2023	Mimì: Prince of Darkness	Giusi	Brando De Sica

==== Television ====
Year	Series	Channel	Character	Episodes
2007	R.I.S. Científica	Telecinco	Extra	1 episode
2007	Los Serrano	Telecinco	Extra	1 episode
2008	Impares	Antena 3	Javier Romano	2 episodes
2008	Los hombres de Paco	Antena 3	Announcement Ruler	1 episode
2009	Hospital central	Telecinco	Vicente	1 episode
2014	La que se avecina	Telecinco	Hotel receptionist	1 episode
2015	Anclados	Telecinco	Extra	1 episode
2016	Temporada baja	Flooxer	Juan	1 episode
2017	Indetectables	Flooxer	Guillermo	1 episode
2018	Paquita Salas	Netflix	Camarera	1 episode
2018 - 2019	Vis a vis	FOX España	Luna Garrido	15 episodes
2020	El desorden que dejas	Netflix	Tere	6 episodes
2021	Señoras del (h)AMPA	Amazon Prime Video	Prostitute in prison	1 episode
2021	Todo lo otro	HBO España	Dafne	8 episodes

== Awards and nominations ==
Year	Category	Award	Title	Result
2009	Best Newcomer Actress	Professional Actors Union of Valencia	La indiferencia de los armadillos	Nominated
2010	Best Supporting Actress	XIX Premis de Teatres de la Generalitat Valenciana	La indiferencia de los armadillos	Won
2010	Best Leading Actress	XIX Premis de Teatres de la Generalitat Valenciana	El congelador	Nominated
2010	Best Actress	15ª Mostra de Teatre de Barcelona	La indiferencia de los armadillos	Won
2011	Best Actress	V Cortocomenius Festival	Nube de colores	Won
2019	Best new actress	XXVIII Actors and Actresses Union Awards	Vis a vis	Nominated
2021	Best Supporting Actress	CinEuphoria Awards	The Life Ahead	Nominated
2021	Best cast of a film	CinEuphoria Awards	The Life Ahead	Nominated
2021	Best state actress	Santurtzi Festival	Polvorón	Won
