= One Way or Another (TV series) =

Television series

- Spanish: Por H o por B
- Genre: Comedy
- Created by: Manuela Burló Moreno
- Written by: Manuela Burló Moreno
- Directed by: Manuela Burló Moreno
- Starring: Marta Martín; Saida Benzal
- Country of origin: Spain
- Original language: Spanish
- No. of seasons: 1
- No. of episodes: 10

Production
- Production location: Community of Madrid
- Running time: c. 30 min
- Production companies: Globomedia (The Mediapro Studio); LACOproductora

Original release
- Network: HBO Europe
- Release: 22 July 2020

One Way or Another (Spanish: Por H o por B) is a Spanish comedy television series created, written and directed by Manuela Burló Moreno which stars Marta Martín and Saida Benzal. Produced by LACOproductora and Globomedia (The Mediapro Studio) for HBO Europe, it was released on 22 July 2020.

== Premise ==
The fiction concerns the reunion of Hache (H) and Belén (B), two women native from Parla (a suburb of Madrid), 5 years after the events dealt with in the short film Pipas. Belén has moved to Malasaña. Amid cultural conflict and misunderstandings galore in an environment alien to them, Hache and Belén try to resume their friendship. The series prominently portraits the culture of the so-called postureo.

== Cast ==
- Marta Martín as Hache (Herminia)
- Saida Benzal as Belén
- Brays Efe as Oli
- Itziar Castro as Choni
- Javier Bódalo
- Fernando Albizu
- Ernesto Sevilla

== Production and release ==
Created, written and directed by Manuela Burló, Por H o por B was produced by LACOproductora and Globomedia (The Mediapro Studio) for HBO Europe. Consisting of 10 episodes featuring a running time of around 30 minutes, the series began filming in Madrid towards May 2019. It was released on 22 July 2020.

Series	Episodes	Originally released	Network	Ref.
1	10	22 July 2020	HBO España	

No.	Title	Directed by	Written by	Original release date
1	"For Old Times Sake" (Por los viejos tiempos)	Manuela Burló Moreno	Manuela Burló Moreno	22 July 2020
2	"Rugs" (Felpudos)	Manuela Burló Moreno	Manuela Burló Moreno	22 July 2020
3	"Malasana District" (Distrito Malasaña)	Manuela Burló Moreno	Manuela Burló Moreno	22 July 2020
4	"Featherheads" (Pájaros en la cabeza)	Manuela Burló Moreno	Manuela Burló Moreno	22 July 2020
5	"Stones on the Path" (Piedras en el camino)	Manuela Burló Moreno	Manuela Burló Moreno	22 July 2020
6	"Belén's Parents" (Los padres de Belén)	Manuela Burló Moreno	Manuela Burló Moreno	22 July 2020
7	"Alphabet Soup" (Sopa de letras)	Manuela Burló Moreno	Manuela Burló Moreno	22 July 2020
8	"Choniland" (Choniland)	Manuela Burló Moreno	Manuela Burló Moreno	22 July 2020
9	"Steal My Heart" (Róbame el corazón)	Manuela Burló Moreno	Manuela Burló Moreno	22 July 2020
10	"Without Masks" (Sin máscaras)	Manuela Burló Moreno	Manuela Burló Moreno	22 July 2020

== Awards and nominations ==
Year	Award	Category	Nominee(s)	Result	Ref.
2021	8th MiM Series Awards	Best Comedy Actress	Saida Benzal	Nominated	
