= The Extraordinary Journey of Celeste Garcia =

Cuban comedy film

- Spanish: El viaje extraordinario de Celeste García
- Directed by: Arturo Infante
- Written by: Arturo Infante
- Produced by: Claudia Calviño; Alfredo Díaz; Ernst Fassbender
- Starring: María Isabel Díaz Lago; Omar Franco; Nestor Jiménez
- Cinematography: Javier Labrador Deulofeu
- Edited by: Joanna Montero
- Music by: Magda Rosa Galban; Juan Antonio Leyva
- Release date: 2018
- Running time: 92 minutes
- Countries: Cuba, Germany
- Language: Spanish

The Extraordinary Journey of Celeste Garcia (Spanish: El viaje extraordinario de Celeste García) is a German-Cuban comedy written and directed by Arturo Infante. The film premiered on 7 September 2018 in the Discovery programme of the 2018 Toronto International Film Festival.

== Plot ==
Celeste Garcia is a 60-year-old Cuban who lives in present-day Havana, where hopes of a brighter future have abandoned her. Her steady, predictable life as a guide at the local planetarium and mother of 25-year-old Pedrito is turned upside down when friendly extraterrestrial aliens make contact with earth, and invite select citizens from all over the world to travel to their unknown planet. Celeste is one of the few to be invited and, to her peers' disbelief, she decides to embark on this journey. But how many light years should you travel to find happiness?

== Cast ==
- María Isabel Díaz Lago as Celeste
- Omar Franco as Augusto
- Néstor Jiménez as Hector Francisco
- Yerlín Pérez as Perlita
- Tamara Castellanos as Mirta
- Veronica Diaz as Zobeida
- Roberto Espinosa as Pedrito
- Reinier Díaz as Yunier
- Andrea Doimeadios as Malu
- Beatriz Viña as Luisa

== Awards ==
In 2019 The Extraordinary Journey of Celeste Garcia won first prize in the New Directors Competition at the Seattle International Film Festival.
