= Berta Vázquez =

Ukrainian-Spanish actress and singer

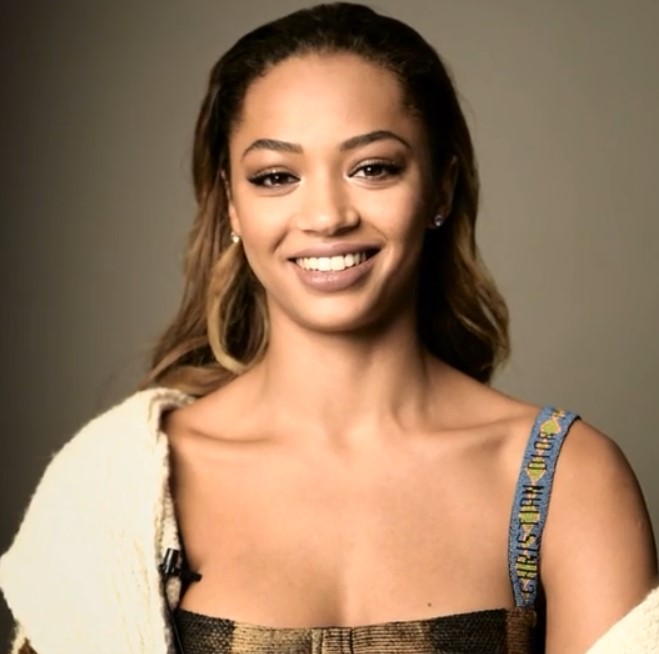
- Vázquez in 2017
- Born: Birtukan Tibebe; 28 March 1992 (age 34); Kyiv, Ukraine
- Occupations: Actress; model; singer
- Years active: 2014–present

Berta Vázquez (born Birtukan Tibebe; 28 March 1992) is a Ukraine-born Spanish actress. Her career began in dance, and later transitioned to acting and music. Vázquez first appeared as Bisila in Palm Trees in the Snow (2015). She played Estefania "Rizos" Kabila in Locked Up.

== Biography ==
Birtukan Tibebe was born in Kyiv, Ukraine in 1992 to an Ethiopian father and a Ukrainian mother. At the age of three, she was adopted by a family in Elche, Spain. She began her dance career training in the Paula Yeray school in Elche. She found the opportunities have come through acting, and to a lesser extent, music.

At age 18, she moved from Elche to Madrid. In 2013, she sent a music video for the casting of The Voice Spain, but was not selected.

In 2014, she was cast in her first role in the film Palmeras en la nieve (2015), based on the novel by Luz Gabás. She played Bisila, who falls in love with Kilian, played by Mario Casas. Vázquez begin dating her co-star and lead actor Mario Casas in 2014 before film production of Palmeras en la Nieve. In 2018 New Years Eve Casas wrote on his social media platforms that he and Vázquez had officially broken up. Also in 2015 Vázquez played her most important role as Estefanía Kabila "Rizos" in Vis a vis, sentenced for 3 years. Throughout her career, she has used various stage names, including Cleo Brian, Mila Russo and currently, Berta Vázquez.

== Filmography ==
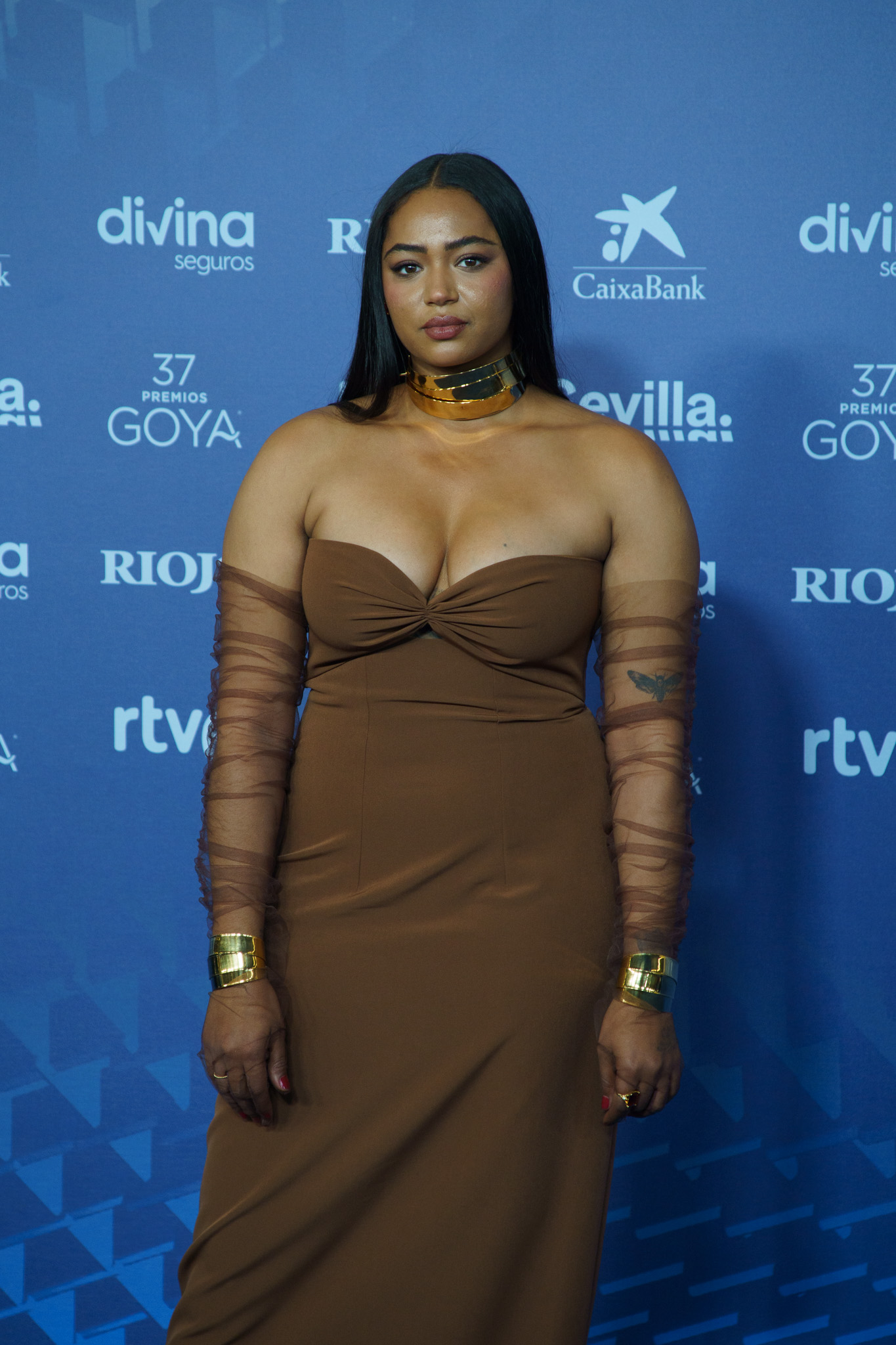
Vázquez attending the 37th Goya Awards

- Palm Trees in the Snow (2015) as Bisila
- Paquita Salas (2016) as Berta Vázquez
- En tu cabeza (2016) as Camarera
- El accidente (2017–2018) as María
- The Laws of Thermodynamics (2018) as Elena
- Locked Up (2015–2019) as Estefania "Rizos" Kabila
- Welcome to Eden (2022) as Claudia
- Un hipster en la España vacía (2024)
- Pequeños calvarios (TBD)
