= Locked Up (TV series) =

Spanish crime drama television series

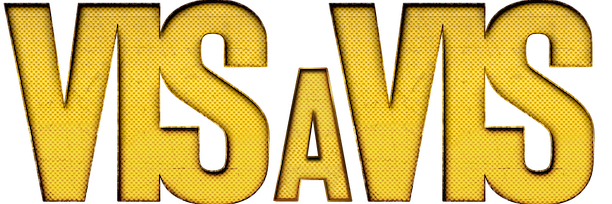
- Spanish: Vis a vis
- Genre: Serial drama; Crime; Thriller
- Created by: Iván Escobar; Esther Martínez Lobato; Álex Pina; Daniel Écijas
- Showrunner: Iván Escobar
- Starring: Maggie Civantos; Najwa Nimri; Carlos Hipólito; Roberto Enríquez; Berta Vázquez; Alba Flores
- Theme music composer: Iván Martínez Lacámara; Manel Santisteban
- Opening theme: "Agnus Dei" by Cecilia Krull
- Country of origin: Spain
- Original language: Spanish
- No. of seasons: 5
- No. of episodes: 48

Production
- Production location: Spain
- Running time: 75 minutes (seasons 1–2); 50 minutes (seasons 3–4)
- Production company: Globomedia

Original release
- Network: Antena 3
- Release: 20 April 2015 – 22 June 2016
- Network: Fox Spain
- Release: 23 April 2018 – 8 June 2020

Related
- Vis a vis: El Oasis

Locked Up (Spanish: Vis a Vis) (Note: Meaning 'Face to face [meeting]' and more specifically '[private] prison visit' / 'conjugal visit' in Spanish) is a Spanish crime drama television series co-created by Álex Pina, Iván Escobar, and Esther Martínez Lobato, and produced by Globomedia. Featuring an ensemble cast, the story focuses on the high-stakes lives of characters in and out of prison, and is primarily led by Macarena Ferreiro (Maggie Civantos), who is imprisoned for financial crimes, and Zulema Zahir (Najwa Nimri), a violent career criminal. The series premiered on 20 April 2015 on Spanish channel Antena 3. Its first two seasons were broadcast by Antena 3, and its last three seasons by Fox Spain.

A year after Antena 3 cancelled the show's broadcast, Fox Spain picked up the series for a third and fourth season. The former premiered on 23 April 2018. Several cast changes were made and Civantos' role was reduced due to commitments to another show. Nimri, Alba Flores, Berta Vázquez, María Isabel Díaz Lago, and Marta Aledo returned as main cast members. Production also moved to a different location, and the previous studio became the set of another Pina show, Money Heist. Vis a Vis became the most watched premium television program in its timeslot and Spain's breakout hit series. In 2017, Netflix bought global streaming rights for the show. The fourth season premiered on 3 December 2018. The spin-off Vis a vis: El Oasis was released in 2020; it concludes Macarena and Zulema's story and serves as the fifth and final season of the series. An audio series set after the fourth season, Vis a Vis: La Cara B (2020), was released on Audible.

Vis a Vis received critical acclaim in Spain and internationally, garnering praise for its intense drama, character dynamics, cast performances, cinematography, and depiction of moral ambiguity. Among its accolades are nominations from the Actors and Actresses Union Awards, Premios Ondas, Premios Iris, Feroz Awards, Fotogramas de Plata, and FesTVal.

== Premise ==
Macarena Ferreiro is a Spanish woman who falls in love with her boss and is led to commit financial crimes. She is charged and placed in preventative detention at a high security prison women's prison while awaiting trial, with a high bail set. To pay the bail, her family outside searches for a large sum of money hidden somewhere. In prison, Macarena becomes embroiled in the activities of dangerous inmates, and in the struggle to avoid her expected seven-year sentence she must evolve and survive.

== Episodes ==
Series	Episodes	Originally released (Spain)			Avg. viewership (millions) and share
Series	Episodes	First released	Last released	Network	Avg. viewership (millions) and share
1	11	20 April 2015	2 July 2015	Antena 3	3.547 (19.9%)
2	13	31 March 2016	22 June 2016	Antena 3	2.431 (14.2%)
3	8	23 April 2018	11 June 2018	FOX Spain	0.151 (0.8%)
4	8	3 December 2018	4 February 2019	FOX Spain	0.129 (0.7%)
El Oasis	8	20 April 2020	8 June 2020	FOX Spain	TBA

=== Season 1 (2015) ===
Manipulated by her lover into committing corporate fraud, Macarena Ferreiro finds herself locked up in Cruz del Sur prison. Yolanda, her cellmate, takes Macarena under her wing, but a midnight visit from Zulema, the prison's most dangerous inmate, changes Macarena's life forever.

=== Season 2 (2016) ===
Zulema, Saray and Macarena escape from prison. Following Sandoval's recommendations, Miranda imposes stricter prison rules and regulations in response to their escape. With authority from the director to use any measures to discipline misbehaving inmates, some officials abuse their power over the inmates.

=== Season 3 (2018) ===
Saray, Rizos, Sole, Tere, Anabel, Antonia, and Zulema adapt to the new environment of Cruz del Norte after being transferred to the new prison.

=== Season 4 (2018–2019) ===
Season four deals with the aftermath of Zulema, Saray, and Altagracia's escape. Altagracia, who used to terrorize the inmates as a prison guard, is now one of them. Sandoval is the new director of Cruz del Norte.

=== Vis a vis: El Oasis (2020) ===
El Oasis is a spin-off that servers as the fifth and final season of the series. It focuses on Macarena and Zulema's life outside of prison, concluding their story.

== Cast and characters ==
While the show initially focused on the character of Macarena Ferreiro, portrayed by Maggie Civantos, it became an ensemble show.

=== Cruz del Sur female inmates ===
- Maggie Civantos as Macarena Ferreiro: A young woman sentenced to prison for seven years due to embezzlement. (season 1–2, Oasis; Recurring: season 3–4).
- Najwa Nimri as Zulema Zahir: Known as the queen of prison due to her criminal records and illegal activities even while incarcerated. (season 1–4, Oasis).
- Berta Vázquez as Estefania "Rizos" Kabila: A young prisoner in prison for four years due to theft and arson of a car. (season 1–4).
- Alba Flores as Saray Vargas de Jesús: A young woman sentenced for assault. (season 1–4, Guest: Oasis).
- Inma Cuevas as Ana Belén "Anabel" Vila Roig Garcés: A woman sentenced to 9 years for prostitution and drugs. (season 1–3).
- María Isabel Díaz Lago as Soledad Núñez Hurtado: A prisoner who burned her husband and his mistress to death. (seasons 1–4).
- Laura Baena as Antonia Trujillo Díez: The prison cook, serving 5 years.
- Belén Cuesta as Yolanda Montero

=== Cruz del Sur employees ===
- Roberto Enríquez as Fabio Martínez León: A hot-tempered prison guard and former police officer. (season 1–2, Guest: 3).
- Ramiro Blas as Carlos Sandoval Castro: The prison doctor of Cruz del Sur and director of Cruz del Norte. (season 1–2,4, Guest: 3, Oasis).
- Cristina Plazas as Miranda Aguirre Senén: The director of Cruz Del Sur. (season 1–2).
- Alberto Velasco as Antonio Palacios Lloret: A friendly prison guard.(season 1–2,4).
- Harlys Becerra as Ismael Valbuena Ugarte: An antagonistic chief prison guard. (season 1–2).
- Ana Labordeta as Paloma Garrido "Governor": The head prison guard. (Recurring season 1).

=== Macarena's family ===
- Carlos Hipólito as Leopoldo Ferreiro Lobo: Macarena's father and former police guard. (season 1–2).
- María Salgueiro as Encarna Molina: Macarena's mother. (season 1–2).
- Daniel Ortiz as Román Ferreiro Molina: Macarena's older brother. (season 1–2, Guest: Oasis).

=== Cruz del Norte inmates ===
- Ruth Díaz as Mercedes Carrillo –A mother and a politician in the local district that was sentenced to prison due to corruption. (season 3; guest: 4).
- Huichi Chiu as Akame: Leader of the Chinese gang in Cruz del Norte and antagonistic towards the newly transferred inmates from Cruz del Sur. (season 3).
- Ana Marzoa as Prudencia Mosqueira: Soledad's friend in prison. (season 3).
- Itziar Castro as Goya Fernández: One of the self-proclaimed leaders of Cruz del Norte and a drug dealer. (season 3–4, Oasis).
- Abril Zamora as Luna Garrido –A transgender inmate who befriended the Cruz del Sur inmates, also a drug addict. (season 3–4).

=== Cruz del Norte employees ===
- Javier Lara as Álex Moncada: Director of Cruz del Norte. (season 3).
- Luis Callejo as Andrés Frutos: A prison guard who secretly trades with the Chinese inmates. (season 3).
- Adriana Paz as Altagracia Guerrero: An ex-prisoner and an antagonistic prison guard, Zulema's accomplice. (season 3–4).
- Cristina Marcos as Magdalena Cruz: Owner of Cruz del Sur, del Norte, del Oeste, and the newly planned del Este. (season 4).
- Benjamín Vicuña as Antonio Hierro: A strict prison guard assigned to monitor Zulema. (season 4).
- Zaira Pérez as Nuria Millán: Prison guard in Cruz del Norte. (Recurring season 3–4).

=== Police ===
- Jesús Castejón as Inspector Damián Castillo: The head detective of the police force. (season 1–4, Guest: Oasis).
- Hugo Guzmán as Camilo Jalapeño: Inspector Castillo's partner. (Recurring season 2).
- Verónika Moral as Helena Martín: An undercover cop in prison.(season 2).
- Jose Javier Domínguez as Inspector Pipiolo: Inspector Castillo's partner. (Recurring season 2).
- Irene Anula as Inspector Nerea Rojas: Inspector Castillo's partner, Rizos' love interest. (Recurring season 3).

=== Cast overview ===
Characters
Actor	Character	season				
Actor	Character	1	2	3	4	Oasis
Maggie Civantos	Macarena Ferreiro Molina	Main	Main	Recurring	Recurring	Main
Najwa Nimri	Zulema Zahir	Main	Main	Main	Main	Main
Carlos Hipólito	Leopoldo Ferreiro Lobo	Main	Main			
Roberto Enríquez	Fabio Martínez León	Main	Main	Guest		
Cristina Plazas	Miranda Aguirre Senén	Main	Main			
Berta Vázquez	Estefanía Kabila Silva "Curly"	Main	Main	Main	Main	
Alba Flores	Saray Vargas de Jesús	Main	Main	Main	Main	Guest
Inma Cuevas	Ana Belén "Anabel" Villaroch Garcés	Main	Main	Main	Guest	
María Isabel Díaz	Soledad "Sole" Núñez Hurtado	Main	Main	Main	Main	
María Salgueiro	Encarna Molina	Main	Main			
Ramiro Blas	Carlos Sandoval Castro	Main	Main	Guest	Main	Guest
Alberto Velasco	Antonio Palacios Lloret	Main	Main		Main	
Marta Aledo	Teresa "Tere" González Largo	Main	Main	Main	Main	
Daniel Ortiz	Román Ferreio Molina	Main	Main			Guest
Harlys Becerra	Ismael Valbuena Ugarte	Main	Main			
Laura Baena	Antonia Trujillo Díez	Main	Main	Main	Main	
Jesús Castejón	Inspector Damián Castillo	Recurring	Recurring	Main	Main	Guest
Ruth Díaz	Mercedes Carrillo			Main	Guest	
Huichi Chiu	Akame			Main		
Javier Lara	Álex Moncada			Main		
Ana Marzoa	Prudencia "Pruden" Mosqueira	Guest		Also Starring		
Luis Callejo	Andrés Frutos			Also Starring		
Adriana Paz	Altagracia Guerrero			Also Starring	Also Starring	
Itziar Castro	Goya Fernández			Recurring	Main	Main
Abril Zamora	Luna Garrido			Recurring	Main	
Georgina Amorós	Fátima Amín				Recurring	
Cristina Marcos	Magdalena Cruz				Also Starring	
Benjamín Vicuña	Antonio Hierro				Also Starring	
David Ostrosky	Víctor Ramala					Main
Lucas Ferraro	Cepo Sandoval Castro					Main
Ana María Picchio	Ama Castro					Recurring
Isabel Naveira	Laura "La Flaca" Ros					Also Starring
Lisi Linder	Mónica Ramala					Also Starring
Claudia Riera	Triana Azcoitia					Also Starring
Alma Itzel	Kati Ramala					Also Starring
Fernando Sansegundocomo	Matías "Mati"Maneses					Also Starring
Iván Morales	Javier Colsa					Also Starring
José de la Torre	Pérez					Also Starring
Almagro San Miguel	Diego Ramala					Also Starring
Lolo Diego	Apolo					Also Starring
Pablo Vázquez	Julián Quintanilla					Also Starring
Natalia Hernández	Elena					Also Starring
Paula Gallego	Virginia "Vivi" Quintanilla					Also Starring
Ismael Palacios	Lucas					Also Starring

= Lead character
= Macarena Ferreio's relatives
= Inmates
= Prison staff
= Police inspectors
= Oasis Characters

== Broadcast ==
Season one premiered on Spanish terrestrial television channel Antena 3 on 20 April 2015. The second season premiered on 31 March 2016. After the season, Antena 3 cancelled their broadcast of series. In 2017, premium television channel Fox Spain picked up the series for a third and fourth season, which Fox co-produced with series producer Globomedia. It was Fox's first production of a fictional series in Spain. The third season premiered on 23 April 2018. Since the season's premiere, it was one of the most watched fictional programs on Spanish cable. The fourth season premiered on 3 December 2018.

Vis a Vis saw increasing significant support on social media. It became the most watched premium television program in its timeslot and Spain's biggest breakout hit. The show was a major success on Fox.

Season one started broadcasting in the United Kingdom on 17 May 2016 on Channel 4's Walter Presents video-on-demand service. It became a flagship series for the platform. In 2017, Prime Video acquired the first two seasons for the United States, and in 2018, Hulu acquired the first four seasons for Japan. In Greece, the series premiered on 27 November 2018 on ERT. Netflix bought the rights for international distribution in 2017.

The series is also available for a limited amount of time on the online streaming service 'VTMGO' by the Belgian broadcaster VTM.

== Reception ==
=== Critical response ===
Vis a Vis received critical acclaim in Spain and internationally. The review aggregator Rotten Tomatoes reported an approval rating for the second season of 100% based on 11 critic reviews, with an average rating of 8.0/10. The website's critical consensus states, "The badass ladies in yellow face new and higher stakes in a second season injected with an extra dose of tension, a sharp plot and awardable performances."

Martin Howse of Entertainment Focus wrote, "The acting is strong throughout, the characters engaging and believable, the script is fast-paced and captivating, and it looks beautiful on screen with some creative and imaginative camerawork. This is violent – brutally so – and very graphic in its portrayal of life in a women's prison. But utterly brilliant at the same time." Rebecca Nicholson from The Guardian described the first two seasons as "a tremendously silly and fantastically taut thriller that carries itself at a breathless pace". Tim Dowling of The Guardian called the series "gripping and gritty", complimenting its cinematography, Spanish dialogue, and "sense of alienation [that] is only heightened by [its] foreignness: the violence; the casual wear the guards walk around in; the idea that your cellmate might keep a pet scorpion." Writing for El País, Natalia Marcos deemed the series risk taking and praised the direction, the character of Zulema, and the cast performances. In The Evening Standard, Ben Travis wrote that it is "intense ... violent, and graphic" and "you'll be so caught up in the fray of the drama that you'll forget about the subtitles within minutes". The Daily Telegraph's Gerard O'Donovan commended the series' performances, sophisticated script, and moral ambiguity, adding that its "ongoing involvement with the world outside the prison walls" elevates it above other series in the prison realm, favorably comparing it to Breaking Bad. After its conclusion, Juan Silvestre of Fotogramas called Vis a Vis a daring and transgressive work of fiction.

=== Accolades ===
Year	Award	Category	Nominees	Result	Ref.
2015	Ondas Awards	Best Actress	Female Cast of Vis a Vis	Won	
2015	FesTVal de Televisión y Radio de Vitoria	Discovery of the Year	Vis a Vis	Won	
2015	Premios MiM	Best Drama Actress for Television	Maggie Civantos	Won	
2016	Spanish Actors Union Awards	Best Female Lead Performance	Maggie Civantos	Won	
2016	Spanish Actors Union Awards	Best Female Lead Performance	Najwa Nimri	Nominated	
2016	Spanish Actors Union Awards	Best Male Lead Performance	Roberto Enríquez	Nominated	
2016	Spanish Actors Union Awards	Best Female Performance in Supporting Role	Alba Flores	Nominated	
2016	Spanish Actors Union Awards	Best Female Performance in Minor Role	Inma Cuevas	Won	
2016	Spanish Actors Union Awards	Best Female Performance in Minor Role	Marta Aledo	Nominated	
2016	Premios Iris	Best Actress	Najwa Nimri	Nominated	
2016	Premios Iris	Best Actor	Carlos Hipolito	Nominated	
2016	Premios Iris	Best Fiction	Vis a Vis	Nominated	
2016	Premios Iris	Best Production	Cristina López Ferrar, Juan López Olivar	Nominated	
2016	Fotogramas de Plata	Audience Award for Best Spanish Series	Vis a Vis	Nominated	
2016	Festival de Luchon (France)	Best Spanish Fiction	Vis a Vis	Won	
2016	Premios Paramount Channel	Best Villain	Najwa Nimri	Won	
2016	Premios Paramount Channel	Best Upcoming Actress	Berta Vázquez	Won	
2016	Premios MiM	Best Drama Series	Vis a Vis	Won	
2016	Premios MiM	Best Direction	Vis a Vis	Nominated	
2017	Spanish Actors Union Awards	Best Female Lead Performance	Maggie Civantos	Nominated	
2017	Spanish Actors Union Awards	Best Female Lead Performance	Najwa Nimri	Nominated	
2017	Spanish Actors Union Awards	Best Male Lead Performance	Roberto Enríquez	Nominated	
2017	Spanish Actors Union Awards	Best Female Performance in Supporting Role	Alba Flores	Won	
2017	Spanish Actors Union Awards	Best Female Performance in Minor Role	Inma Cuevas	Won	
2017	Spanish Actors Union Awards	Best Female Performance in Minor Role	Maria Isabel Díaz	Nominated	
2017	Feroz Awards	Best Drama Series	Vis a Vis	Nominated	
2017	Feroz Awards	Best Lead Actress	Maggie Civantos	Nominated	
2017	Feroz Awards	Best Lead Actress	Najwa Nimri	Nominated	
2017	Feroz Awards	Best Supporting Actress	Alba Flores	Nominated	
2017	Feroz Awards	Best Supporting Actress	Inma Cuevas	Nominated	
2017	Fotogramas de Plata	Audience Award for Best Spanish Series	Vis a Vis	Won	
2017	Fotogramas de Plata	Best TV Actress	Najwa Nimri	Nominated	
2017	Fénix Awards	Best TV Ensemble	Vis a Vis	Nominated	
2018	Premios Iris	Best Actress	Alba Flores	Nominated	
2018	Premios Iris	Best Director	Jesus Colmenar, Sandra Gallego, David Molina Encinas, Jesus Rodrigo	Nominated	
2018	Premios MiM	Best Drama Series	Vis a Vis	Nominated	
2018	Premios MiM	Best Drama Actress	Najwa Nimri	Nominated	
2019	Spanish Actors Union Awards	Best Male Performance in a Minor Role	Jesus Castejon	Nominated	
2019	Spanish Actors Union Awards	Best Female Newcomer	Abril Zamora	Nominated	
2019	Feroz Awards	Best Lead Actress	Najwa Nimri	Nominated	
2019	Fotogramas de Plata	Best TV Actress	Najwa Nimri	Won	
2019	Platino Awards	Best Actress in Mini series or TV Series	Najwa Nimri	Nominated	
2019	Spanish Audio Visual Award	Best TV Show Music	Manel Santisteban, Ivan Martinez Lacamara	Nominated	
2020	Spanish Actors Union Awards	Best Male Supporting Performance	Alberto Velasco	Nominated	

== Other media ==
On 12 April 2018, before the premiere of the third season, Fox broadcast a prequel short film on Zulema's past, titled Yo Soy Zulema, narrated by the character. In the film, three versions of Zulema appear at different ages.

A Spanish audio series, Vis a Vis: La Cara B, was released in September 2020 on Audible. Set after the fourth season of the original series, Macarena and Zulema return to Cruz del Sur for a reintegration program, where things are not what they seem. The audio series was created by Jose Angel Esteban under supervision by Vis a Vis showrunner Ivan Escobar. It features 12 episodes and stars Civantos and Nimri, alongside a supporting cast.
