= Palm Trees in the Snow =

- Theatrical release poster
- Directed by: Fernando González Molina
- Written by: Sergio G. Sánchez
- Based on: Palmeras en la nieve by Luz Gabás
- Produced by: Adrián Guerra; Mercedes Gamero; Mikel Lejarza
- Starring: Mario Casas; Berta Vázquez; Adriana Ugarte; Macarena García; Alain Hernández
- Cinematography: Xavi Giménez
- Edited by: Irene Blecua; Verónica Callón
- Music by: Lucas Vidal
- Production companies: Nostromo Pictures; Dynamo Producciones; Atresmedia Cine; Warner Bros. Pictures
- Distributed by: Warner Bros. Pictures
- Release date: 25 December 2015 (Spain)
- Running time: 163 minutes
- Countries: Spain; Colombia
- Languages: Spanish; Bube; Pichinglis; Aragonese
- Budget: €10 million
- Box office: $18.4 million

Palm Trees in the Snow (Spanish: Palmeras en la nieve) is a 2015 Spanish romantic drama film directed by Fernando González Molina. Penned by Sergio G. Sánchez, the screenplay is based on the 2012 novel Palmeras en la nieve, by Luz Gabás.

== Plot ==
Kilian is a young man from the mountains of Huesca who, in 1954, returns to the island of Fernando Pó (present Bioko), where he was born. He joins his father Antón and his brother Jacobo. They are one of many Spanish families who harvest cocoa in Spanish Guinea.

The movie opens in 1968 with Kilian and Bisila making love. Shortly after, Killian departs, leaving behind a half-torn picture and his hat as a memento for Bisila. Flash forward to 2003 Pasolobino, Spain, where Clarence is attending the funeral of her estranged father Jacobo. After the funeral Clarence and her cousin Daniela discuss the possibility of selling the family land. They also discuss Daniela's father, Kilian, who is suffering from dementia. While in Kilian's office Clarence finds a journal, a half-torn picture and a torn note stating that money has been sent to an unidentified woman. Clarence asks Julia, an old family friend, about the note. Julia admits that her deceased husband Manuel wrote the note but she doesn't know who the woman is. Clarence tells Julia that she will travel to Bioko in Equatorial Guinea to find out more about her father's life. Clarence also decides that if there are relatives in Bioko she will bring them back to Spain. Julia tells Clarence to look for a man named Simón, who was Kilian's houseboy and friend.

Flashing back to 1954, a young Kilian and Jacobo are saying goodbye to their mother and sister Catalina as they depart for Guinea. Catalina gives Kilian a journal and encourages him to write in it. On the ship to Bioko Kilian and Jacobo meet Manuel, the new resident doctor of the cocoa plantation estate. Once on land they are greeted by Kilian and Jacobo's father Anton, and his best friend Ose. On the plantation, Kilian has an unpleasant introduction to Gregorio, an abusive overseer. While in the cocoa fields Kilian wanders off into the nearby forest where he hears singing. He follows the singing to a waterfall where he sees a woman crying. Kilian attempts to introduce himself to her but gets distracted by noise from the bushes, where he discovers Gregorio with a native prostitute. She is gone by the time he looks again for her. Later on a young Julia invites Kilian, Jacobo, and Anton to a dinner party at her parents' estate. During the dinner party Nelson, an estate worker, arrives asking for Jacobo's help with a medical emergency. Once in the car Jacobo reveals to Kilian that it was a ruse to leave the dinner party early to go to a night club called Santa Isabel. At the club, Jacobo encourages Kilian to drink and sleep with prostitutes.

During a lavish estate party Julia confronts Jacobo about his ruse at the dinner party, scolding him for his activities at Santa Isabel. Jacobo rebuffs Julia stating that they are not a couple and he will do as he pleases. Kilian introduces Manuel to Julia and they immediately become attracted to each other. Weeks later Anton, annoyed with Kilian's activities, takes him to visit Ose's village and introduces him to the Bubi people. Anton encourages Kilian to explore the land and get to know the locals. Sometime later Ose invites Anton and Kilian to his daughter Bisila's wedding in the village. When giving congratulations to the bride Kilian is surprised to see that she is the same woman from the waterfall. He immediately becomes attracted to her. Soon after, Antón's health takes a turn for the worse and he dies. At Antón's funeral Jacobo runs off into the forest. When Julia attempts to console him, Jacobo forcibly kisses Julia, but she pushes him away, stating that she is engaged to be married to Manuel. Frustrated, Jacobo runs into the forest screaming. Filled with grief from his father's death, Kilian leaves Bioko and returns to Pasolobino for 3 years.

In present-day 2003, Clarence has arrived in Bioko, locates Antón's grave, and is introduced to Iniko, a plantation office employee. While driving Clarence back to her hotel Iniko detours to pick up his younger brother, Laha, who has returned home from university in Spain. Iniko and Laha show Clarence around town, and Iniko and Clarence gradually develop a relationship. Iniko reluctantly helps Clarence find out more about the cocoa plantation estate. After being met with hostility from the plantation workers, they are introduced to an elderly Simón. Simón tells Clarence that Iniko's grandfather, Ose, was friends with her grandfather, Antón. A confused Iniko demands to know what Clarence is really searching for. Clarence tells Iniko about her uncle Kilian and her father Jacobo, then shows Iniko the half-torn picture. A shocked Iniko tells Clarence that the woman in the picture is his mother Bisila. Iniko takes Clarence to the elderly Bisila's home, where Bisila tells Clarence her connection with Kilian.

Flashing back to 1957, Kilian returns to Bioko. Kilian visits Ose and the Bubi people at their village. Ose reintroduces Bisila (she states her name as Daniela Bisila), her husband Mosi, and their son Iniko to Kilian. Kilian then visits Santa Isabel looking for Jacobo. While there, Gregorio takes a prostitute at gunpoint after arguing over her with another man. Kilian talks Gregorio down and then takes Jacobo, Dick, and Pao back to the estate. The next day, Kilian sends Jacobo on a plane back to Spain. Kilian visits Julia at her parents' store and they discuss the hostile changes of the political climate. Bisila arrives to tell Julia that her friend Gustavo, a local politician, has been attacked. Julia asks Kilian to assist her and Bisila with rescuing Gustavo, smuggling him through military checkpoints. At the estate Bisila, a nurse, attends to Gustavo's wounds. Killian and Bisila almost share a kiss, later meeting in a shed where they profess their connection and make love. Though they try to keep their affair a secret, everyone on the estate finds out about the affair.

In 1964 Kilian's mother sends him a letter requesting he return to Spain due to his sister Catalina's declining health. Kilian stays in Spain for several months after Catalina dies. Jacobo returns to Bioko and visits Julia, telling her that he has met a woman in Spain. Jacobo makes another advance towards Julia, who tells him to leave. That evening at the estate, Bisila is cornered by a car with a drunken Jacobo, Dick, and Pao inside. They proceed to beat and rape Bisila. Simón finds her, she swears him to secrecy, and tends to her injuries. The next day Kilian returns; Jacobo is in the plantation hospital with syphilis. Dick and Pao's bodies are found hanging from a tree. It is implied that Mosi, Bisila's husband is taking revenge for the rape. Kilian confronts Ose and Simón, they inform him of Bisila's rape, and warn him not to interfere, or Mosi will find out about their affair. Kilian tells Jacobo of Dick and Pao's deaths and then confronts him about Bisila's rape. Kilian beats Jacobo and warns him of Mosi's revenge. Kilian asks Bisila for forgiveness and she hints at Mosi's attack. Later on Mosi attempts to kill Jacobo but Kilian arrives in the middle of the attack, giving Jacobo time to shoot Mosi dead. Kilian sends Jacobo back to Spain. Bisila tells Kilian that she must leave and mourn Mosi's death for a year, after which she will be free to be with him. Kilian tells Bisila that he will wait for her.

In 1968, a new president is elected for the newly independent Republic of Equatorial Guinea, and the Spanish colonists are being forced to leave. Julia's parents lose their business and begin to make plans to return to Spain. Back at the estate, various overseers such as Gregorio have gone missing. While walking through the cocoa fields Kilian is approached by three angry laborers. They force Killian to go deep into the forest, where he is forced to dig his own grave. A laborer tells Kilian that he originally wanted to kill Jacobo for killing Mosi, but now Kilian will pay the price. Simón arrives and convinces the laborer not to kill Kilian as long as he leaves and takes Bisila with him at the end of her mourning. As Julia and Manuel are preparing to leave for Spain, Julia begs Kilian to leave with them and suggests he bring Bisila along. Julia brings Bisila to her home, marking the end of Bisila's year-long mourning. Bisila arrives with Iniko and her second son Laha, telling Kilian that he is Laha's father. The next day Julia, Manuel, Kilian, Bisila, and Nelson and his wife attempt to leave Bioko by boarding a ship to Spain, with other Spanish colonists and some locals. Julia and Manuel pass through the gate successfully, but a guard prevents Bisila and her children from passing because everyone considered Guinean is prohibited from leaving. The crowd becomes agitated and pushes the gate down, and the guards begin shooting at the crowd. Julia and Manuel escape on to a motorboat where Julia's parents are waiting, while Nelson is shot dead. Kilian and Bisila return to the estate, marry in front of a rock the call the Keeper of the isle, and attempt to live together as a family but Kilian is eventually forced to leave alone.

In present-day 2003 Clarence returns to Pasolobino, where she visits the elderly Kilian. Clarence gives Kilian the hat he gave to Bisila. Upon seeing the hat Kilian remembers Bisila. Clarence begins to sing a song that Kilian heard Bisila sing when they first met. Back in Bioko, the elderly Bisila receives a letter from Spain informing of Kilian's death. Bisila travels to the beach where she walks into the ocean tide. Iniko and Laha arrive in Pasolobino to visit Clarence, who introduces them to Daniela.

== Cast ==
- Mario Casas as Kilian de Rabaltué, the main male character who works on his family's cocoa plantation
  - Celso Bugallo as older Kilian
- Berta Vázquez as Bisila, a mixed-race woman; the love interest of Kilian
  - Victoria Evita Ika as older Bisila
- Adriana Ugarte as Clarence, one of the female leads who travels to Bioko to learn more about her father's history
- Djedje Apali as Iniko
- Macarena García as Julia
  - Petra Martínez as older Julia
- Alain Hernández as Jacobo de Rabaltué, the brother of Kilian and father of Clarence
- Laia Costa as Daniela
- Emilio Gutiérrez Caba as Antón
- Daniel Grao as Manuel, doctor on the plantation in Bioko
- Fernando Cayo as Garuz
- Serge Happi as Simon
- Michael Bautista as Laha
- Fanor Zapata as Mosi

== Production ==
The film was shot in the Canary Islands, Huesca and Colombia.

== Soundtrack ==
The soundtrack for this filmed received lots of attention from reviewers as well as award shows. Below are listed some of the songs from the soundtrack as listed by IMDb.

Track	Written By	Performed By
Palmeras en la nieve	Pablo Alborán and Lucas Vidal	Pablo Alborán
No te puedo querer	Carmelo Larrea Carricarte and Manuel Salinger	Javier Godino
Mama		Yolanda Eyama
Nye Köppé Nye Lölaka		
Welcome to Malabo		Yolanda Eyama
Cast Your Cares	Paul Mottram	
Ngé Meyém		Yolanda Eyama

== Awards and nominations ==
Awards	Category	Nominated	Result	Ref.
3rd Feroz Awards	Best Original Score		Nominated	
30th Goya Awards	Best Art Direction	Antón Laguna	Won	
30th Goya Awards	Best Production Supervision	Toni Novella	Nominated	
30th Goya Awards	Best Costume Design	Lolés García Galeán	Nominated	
30th Goya Awards	Best Makeup and Hairstyles	Alicia López, Karmele Soler, Manolo García and Pedro de Diego	Nominated	
30th Goya Awards	Best Original Song	"Palmeras en la nieve" by Lucas Vidal and Pablo Alborán	Won	

== Reception ==
This film resulted in much praise and appreciation in the Spanish box office, especially since much of recent Spanish films have missed the opportunity to show Spain's colonial history. Many of the positive reviews of the film relate to its beautiful film location and the romantic plot between the two main characters. Additionally many of the rave reviews relate to the cinematography of the film that very much followed that of a novel in the sense that the directors took the time to develop the characters the plot without rushing to fit the film into a smaller time frame. One film reviewer emphasized that "they both have such excellent on-screen chemistry (the love which has blossomed from reel to real life too) that many times you can send ether penetrating love even through the yearning glances through the windows across the street or even during the lighting of a torch across the alley to indicate each other's presence."

On Rotten Tomatoes the film has an approval rating of 86% based on reviews from 7 critics.

Critics to the film highlight that it did not properly address many of the themes related to colonialism even though it was the central focus of the movie.

== See also ==
- List of Spanish films of 2015
