= Rifkin's Festival =

2020 film by Woody Allen

- Spanish theatrical release poster
- Directed by: Woody Allen
- Written by: Woody Allen
- Produced by: Letty Aronson; Erika Aronson; Jaume Roures
- Starring: Elena Anaya; Louis Garrel; Gina Gershon; Sergi López; Wallace Shawn; Christoph Waltz
- Cinematography: Vittorio Storaro
- Edited by: Alisa Lepselter
- Music by: Stephane Wrembel
- Production companies: Gravier Productions; Mediapro; Wildside
- Distributed by: Tripictures (Spain); Vision Distribution (Italy); MPI Media Group (United States)
- Release dates: September 18, 2020 (Zinemaldia); October 2, 2020 (Spain); January 28, 2022 (United States)
- Running time: 92 minutes
- Countries: Spain; United States; Italy
- Language: English
- Box office: $2.3 million

Rifkin's Festival is a 2020 comedy film written and directed by Woody Allen. Starring Wallace Shawn, Elena Anaya, Louis Garrel, Gina Gershon, Sergi López and Christoph Waltz, it follows a couple who fall in love while in town attending the San Sebastián International Film Festival.

The film had its world premiere out of competition at the 68th San Sebastián International Film Festival on September 18, 2020, and was released in Spain on October 2, 2020, by Tripictures. On January 28, 2022, the film began a limited release in United States theaters and on streaming services.

== Plot ==
Mort Rifkin, a snobby elderly film critic from New York, is telling his therapist about the recent developments in his life. In the recount, he's accompanying his much younger wife Sue to a film festival in San Sebastián. She works as a press agent for Philippe, a French director whose banal and derivative anti-war film is being universally celebrated as a masterpiece, to Mort's chagrin. Mort quickly becomes jealous of Sue and Philippe's relationship, which increasingly moves into open flirtation. Mort's inner thoughts and fears causes him to have nightmares inspired by well-known black and white cinematic classics like Citizen Kane, Breathless, Jules and Jim, A Man and a Woman, Persona, Wild Strawberries, The Exterminating Angel, and 8½.

While at the festival, Mort reminisces about his life and the pretentious novel that he's been writing for decades, trying to achieve a literary relevance that eludes him. He reflects upon his younger years when he used to teach cinema at the university and felt happy and stimulated. Meanwhile, he's helpless to keep Sue and Philippe from spending time with each other. Eventually, he seeks medical advice about some chest pains and meets Joanna "Jo" Rojas, a Spanish doctor who spent some time in New York and is now unhappily married with an unfaithful, temperamental artist. Joanna leaves a lasting impression on Mort and he repeatedly tries to engage her attention by faking health issues. Eventually, the two go on a sight-seeing drive through the surrounding country, both having a good time in the process.

On their way back to town, a flat tire forces Joanna and Mort to hitchhike back to Joanna's home, where she discovers her husband cheating on her with one of his models. The two have a bitter fight, then Joanna takes Mort back to his hotel. Here, Sue confronts Mort about their deteriorating relationship, eventually announcing she's leaving him to start a new life with Philippe. The next morning, Mort calls Joanna, hoping to see her again before he has to return to New York, but she politely declines, despite harboring some affection for Mort and doubts about her own marriage's toxicity.

Finally, Mort imagines himself playing chess with Death in a parody of Ingmar Bergman's 1957 film The Seventh Seal. Death tells him that human life is ultimately meaningless, but doesn't need to be empty. In a parting word of advice, Death tells Mort that he will see him again in the future, but Mort might win some extra time by making sure to exercise and to avoid processed foods. As the festival reaches its closing day, Mort reflects upon his changed circumstances, pondering going back to being a teacher, this time with a less rigid attitude towards art. Back in New York, he asks his therapist what he should do now.

== Cast ==
- Wallace Shawn as Mort Rifkin
  - Cameron Hunter as Young Mort Rifkin
- Gina Gershon as Sue Rifkin
- Elena Anaya as Dr. Joanna "Jo" Rojas
- Louis Garrel as Philippe
- Sergi López as Paco
- Christoph Waltz as Death
- Tammy Blanchard as Doris Rifkin
- Steve Guttenberg as Mort's Brother
- Richard Kind as Mr. Rifkin
- Nathalie Poza as Mrs. Rifkin
- Douglas McGrath as Gil Brenner
- Enrique Arce as Tomás Lopez
- Damian Chapa as Festivalgoer
- Bobby Slayton as Festivalgoer
- Andrea Trepat as Dr. Rojas' Assistant
- Iñigo Etxebeste as Host
- Yan Tual as Paul
- Georgina Amorós as Delores
- Yuri D. Brown as Priest

== Production ==
In February 2019, Amazon Studios dropped Allen from a five-picture deal to produce and finance films, following the revival of the sexual abuse allegations made against him in 1992. That month, it was announced Allen would write and direct this film, with Jaume Roures producing under his Mediapro banner. In June 2019, Gina Gershon, Christoph Waltz, Elena Anaya, Louis Garrel, Sergi López, and Wallace Shawn joined the cast. In July 2020, Richard Kind announced he would appear in the film.

=== Filming ===
Principal photography began on July 10, 2019, in San Sebastián, Spain, and ended on August 16, a week ahead of schedule.

== Release ==
In April 2020, Tripictures acquired the film's Spanish distribution rights. The film had its world premiere at the 68th San Sebastián International Film Festival on September 18, 2020, and was released in Spain on October 2, having previously been scheduled to be released in the country on September 25. It was scheduled to be released by Vision Distribution in Italy on November 5, 2020, but the release was postponed until May 6, 2021, due to the COVID-19 pandemic. On January 28, 2022, the film began a limited release in United States theaters and on streaming services.

== Reception ==
=== Box office ===
As of May 28, 2021, the film had grossed $768,449 in Spain and $1.8 million worldwide (Spain, the Netherlands, Ukraine, Italy, and Russia).

=== Critical reception ===
On review aggregator website Rotten Tomatoes, Rifkin's Festival has a 41% approval rating based on 81 reviews, with an average score of 5.2/10; the site's "critics consensus" reads: "While it doesn't rank among Woody Allen's truly lesser late-period efforts, Rifkin's Festival finds the filmmaker content to revisit well-worn territory." On Metacritic, the film has a weighted average score of 44 out of 100 based on reviews by 16 critics, indicating "mixed or average reviews".

Jonathan Romney of The Observer gave the film three stars out of five and stated, "In some ways, Rifkin’s Festival is absolutely familiar Allen territory, and, whatever else his detractors can or can’t accuse him of, there’s no way he’ll get off the charge of ploughing the same ground for the last couple of decades. Once again, he has made a brittle comedy about marital angst in a glamorous setting." Jessica Kiang of The New York Times commented, "So it’s a relief to report that Rifkin’s Festival is, to the ravenous captive, like finding an unexpected stash of dessert: not substantial and not nutritious, but sweet enough to remind you in passing of the good times you once had, despite all that's happened in the interim." Guy Lodge of Variety added, "His 49th feature, Rifkin’s Festival is the latest in a lengthy string of undistinguished bagatelles that might all be described as effortless, and not in an especially complimentary fashion."

In an even less favorable review, Kaleem Aftab of IndieWire gave the movie a C grade, writing, "There's a strange meta quality to the way the movie drifts around, dipping in and out of a tepid plot. Of course, there's no surprise here. Like a lot of recent Allen movies, it's easy enough to figure out the intentions at hand early on." Chuck Bowen of Slant Magazine gave the film one star out of four, noting, "Decades into his iconic career, Woody Allen is still fixated on wannabe intellectual artists obsessively grappling with the meaninglessness of life as they have dalliances with much younger women who’re yearning for passion. That scenario was curdling into shtick some 40 years ago, but it at least felt personal to Allen in his salad days, when he was determined to fuse the existential agony of the films made by his heroes with his own scrappy, impertinent stand-up spirit. Now Allen is seemingly filming whatever writing spills from his typewriter, which is more often than not a copy of a copy of a copy of past hits, material so anachronistic and contrived that it feels closer to ritual than art."

=== Accolades ===
Year	Award	Category	Nominee(s)	Result	Ref.
2021	8th Feroz Awards	Best Film Poster	Jordi Labanda	Won	
