= Jesús Palacios Trigo =

Jesús Joaquín Palacios Trigo (born 1964) is a Spanish author, journalist and film critic.

== Biography ==
Palacios was born in 1964 in San Lorenzo de El Escorial, Spain. He began his career with his father Joaquin Palacios, editor of Antología de la poesía macabra española e hispano americana (Valdemar 2000), editing fanzines like Excalibur (1984) and El Grito (1986), focused in horror, fantastic and macabre, a field in which is today considered a cult author.

Palacios attended the prestigious Complutense University of Madrid, where he graduated in Journalism.

Palacios is the author of numerous books, like Goremanía, Satán en Hollywood. Una historia mágica del cine, or the critically praised Psychokillers.

His critics has been published by many of the main film magazines in Spanish language, like Fotogramas, Nosferatu or CINE2000. He has collaborated with many important weekly and daily news papers like Tiempo, Tribuna, Interviú, Qué Leer, El Cultural, El Mundo, La Razón, Generación XXI, etc. He is also a frequent collaborator of many film festivals, like Festival Internacional de Cine de Las Palmas de Gran Canaria, Semana Negra de Gijón, Festival de Cine de Sitges, Festival de Cine de Gijón, Semana de Cine Fantástico y de Terror de San Sebastián, among others.

Palacios also has participated in many TV shows as a film critic and an expert in the macabre. One of his last projects in this media is the very popular "Inferno 13" for the Spanish network Calle 13.

== Published work ==
=== Author ===
- Goremanía, Alberto Santos Editor, 1995
- Planeta Zombi, Midons Editorial, 1996
- Satán en Hollywood, Valdemar 1997
- Psychokillers, Ediciones Temas de Hoy, 1998
- Goremanía 2, Alberto Santos Editor, 1999
- Los ricos también matan, Temas de Hoy, 2000
- Alégrame el día, Espasa-Calpe, 2000
- Nosotros los vampiros, Oberon, 2002
- La fábrica de sueños, Espasa, 2003
- Desde el infierno, Oberon, 2004
- Eric Jan Hanussen. La vida y los tiempos del mago de Hitler, Oberon, 2005
- Juegos mortales: Katanas, mentiras y cintas de vídeo, Espasa-Calpe, 2007. ISBN 978-84-670-2634-4
- ¿Qué debes saber para parecer un cinéfilo?, Espasa-Calpe, 2008. ISBN 978-84-670-2933-8
- Aleksei Balabanov, Festival Internacional de Cine de Gijón, 2009
- Hollywood maldito, Valdemar 2014

=== Editor or curator ===
- Cara a cara. Una mirada al cine de género italiano, Semana negra de Gijón, 2004 (con Rubén Paniceres)
- Gun crazy. Serie negra se escribe con B, T&B, 2005 (con Antonio Weinrichter)
- Euronoir. Serie negra con sabor europeo, T&B, 2006
- Asia Noir. Serie negra al estilo oriental, T&B, 2007 (con Roberto Cueto)
- Métal Hurlant y el Cine Fantástico, Donostia Kultura, 2009
- La bestia en la pantalla. Aleister Crowley y el cine fantástico, Donostia Kultura, 2010
- NeoNoir. Cine negro americano moderno, T&B, 2011

=== Collective work ===
- Los desarraigados en el cine español, Festival Internacional de Cine de Gijón, 1998.
- El Giallo italiano. La oscuridad y la sangre, Nuer, 2001.
- La nueva carne. Una estética perversa del cuerpo, Valdemar 2002.
- El día del niño, Valdemar 2003.
- Imágenes del mal, Valdemar 2003.
- Europa imaginaria. Cinco miradas sobre lo fantástico en el Viejo Continente, Valdemar 2006.
- El demonio en el cine. Máscara y espectáculo, Valdemar 2007.
- El cine de ciencia ficción. Explorando mundos, Valdemar 2008.
- American Gothic. El cine de terror USA 1968–1980, Donostia Kultura, 2008
- Las sombras del horror. Edgar Allan Poe en el cine, Valdemar 2009.
- Pesadillas en la oscuridad, Valdemar 2010.
- Drácula. Un monstruo sin reflejos, Reino de Cordelia, 2012.
- Neoculto. El libro imprescindible sobre el cine de culto. Calamar 2012
