= Georgina Amorós =

Spanish actress (born 1998)

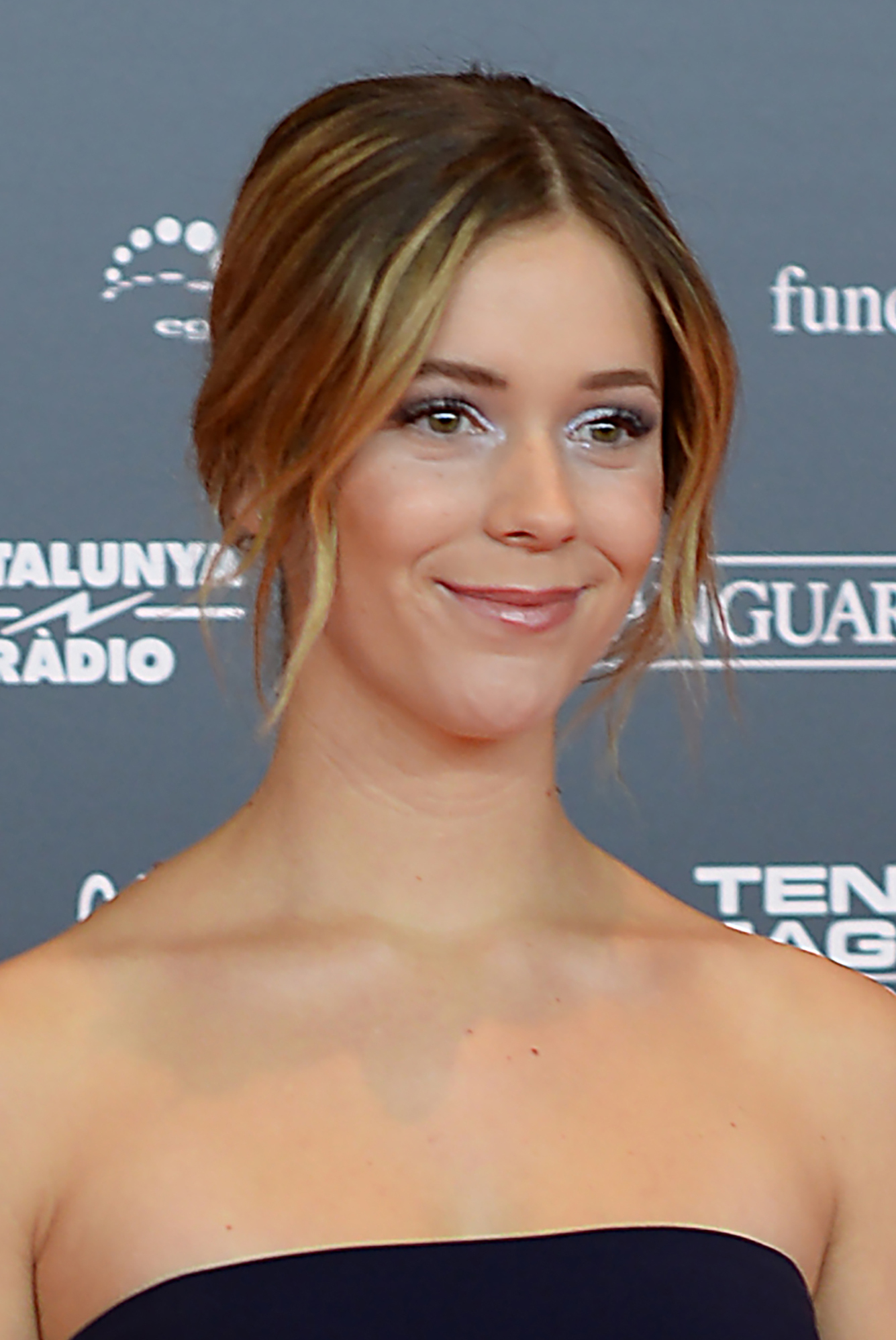
- Georgina Amorós at the Gaudí Awards in 2020.
- Born: Georgina Amorós Sagrera; 30 April 1998 (age 27); Barcelona, Catalonia, Spain
- Occupation: Actress
- Years active: 2014–present

Georgina Amorós Sagrera (30 April 1998) is a Spanish actress known for her television work on series including Elite, Welcome to the Family and Locked Up. She featured in the 2020 film Rifkin's Festival, marking it as her first fully English-speaking role.

== Early life ==
Georgina Amorós Sagrera was born on 30 April, 1998, in Barcelona. She speaks fluent Catalan, Spanish, French and English.

== Career ==
Amorós has said that she began acting as a child in small productions, and had to be dragged away at the end because she enjoyed it so much. At the age of 17, she moved to Los Angeles, United States, to study acting. Since 2017 she has worked on several Netflix series, including Welcome to the Family, not a Netflix original, where she had her first leading role as Àlex. Her character's season 2 story was teased in a video by Catalan network TV3 calling it an "amorous plot". Of her works, she has said that she is the most proud of Welcome to the Family, her only Catalan-language work, because of how much she learnt. She also starred in prison drama Locked Up in its final season, playing Fatima Amir, the daughter of Najwa Nimri's character.

In 2019, she joined the cast of the Netflix original series Elite, playing Cayetana, a scholarship student and daughter of the school cleaner. The character, who is a social media influencer, explores how people aren't always who they appear to be online. Amorós says that Cayetana is "apparently happy but has a lot of levels and isn't at all what she seems". The media compares Cayetana with Amorós herself, noting that the actress shares unflattering photos on Instagram and uses her popularity to promote causes. That same year, she was cast as Delores in the 2020 Woody Allen film Rifkin's Festival, her first English-speaking role. After having seen Allen's 2008 film Vicky Cristina Barcelona, Amorós was excited to know that he had been in her hometown in Barcelona.

== Personal life ==
In 2019, she received death threats on Twitter because of her character on Elite and deleted her account.

Since late 2019, Amorós has been in a relationship with producer Diego Betancor.

Amorós is a feminist and campaigns against LGBT+ discrimination. In 2019, she contributed to the campaign 'Por Un Solo Voto', encouraging young people in Spain to use their vote.

== Filmography ==
=== Television ===
| Year | Title | Character | Channel | Notes |
|---|---|---|---|---|
| 2014 | Velvet | Young Ana Rivera López | Antena 3 | 4 episodes |
| 2015 | Bajo sospecha | Emilia "Emi" Vega Castro | Antena 3 | 8 episodes |
| 2015 | Águila Roja | | La 1 | 3 episodes |
| 2016 | Seis Hermanas | Lorenza | La 1 | 7 episodes |
| 2017–2018 | Welcome to the Family | Alexandra "Àlex" Argenté | TV3 | 26 episodes |
| 2017–2018 | Locked Up | Fátima Amin | FOX | 5 episodes (season 4) |
| 2019–2022 | Elite | Cayetana Grajera Pando | Netflix | Main, 31 episodes (season 2-5) |
| 2021 | Élite: historias breves | Cayetana Grajera Pando | Netflix | Main, 7 episodes |
| 2023 | In Love All Over Again | Irene | Netflix | Main, 8 episodes |
| 2024 | Segunda muerte | Sandra Ortiz | Movistar Plus+ | Main, 6 episodes |

=== Film ===
| Year | Movie | Character | Director | Ref. |
|---|---|---|---|---|
| 2016 | Tini: The Movie | Eloísa Martínez | Juan Pablo Buscarini | |
| 2017 | It's for Your Own Good | Marta | Carlos Therón | |
| 2020 | Rifkin's Festival | Delores | Woody Allen | |
| 2022 | Código Emperador (Code Name: Emperor) | Marta | | |
| 2023 | La última noche de Sandra M. (The Last Night of Sandra M.) | Inma | | |
| 2024 | Puntos suspensivos (Ellipsis) | Adriana | | |
