= Mamá, Mamá, Mamá =

Argentine independent drama movie

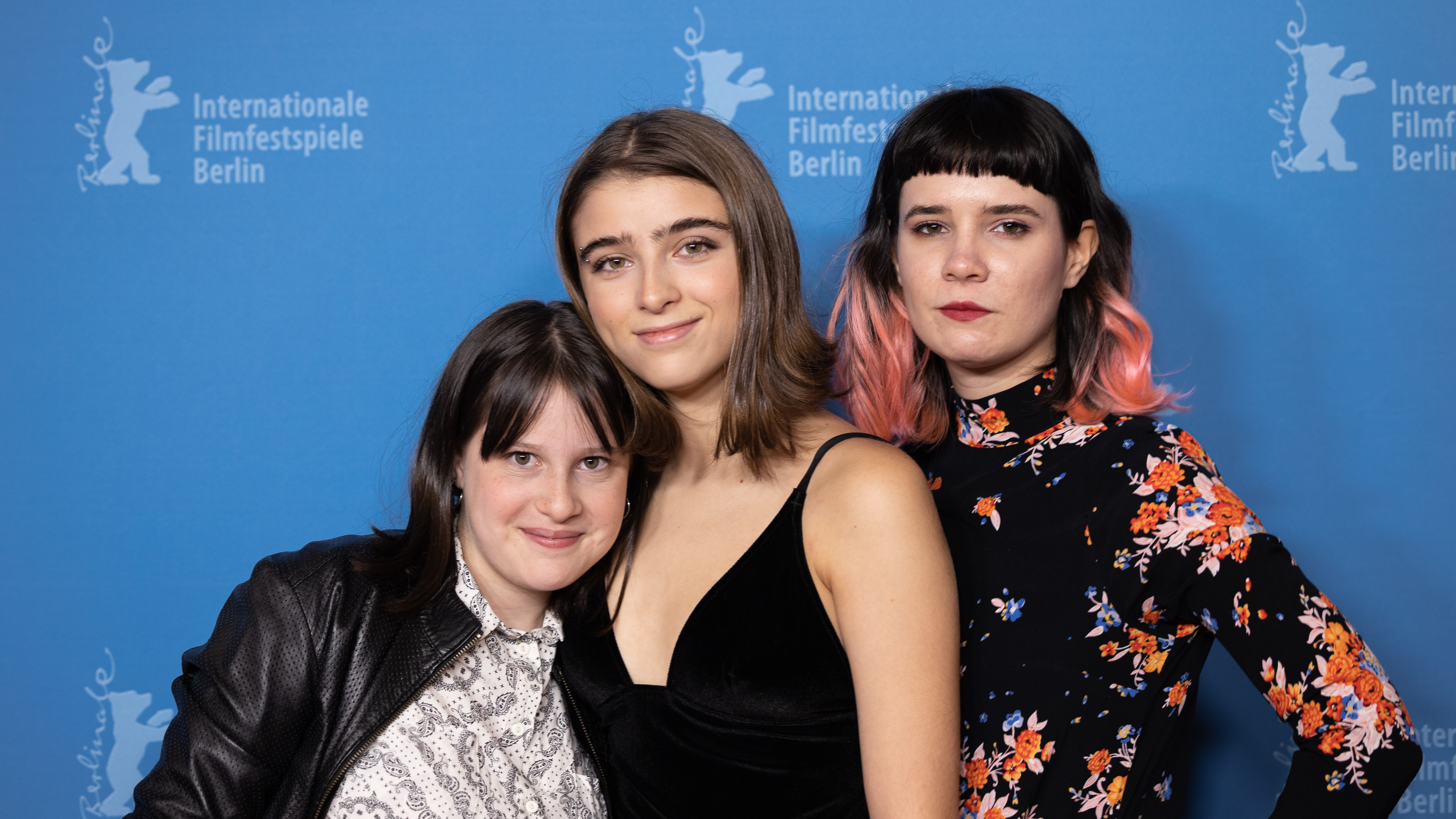
Agustina Milstein, Chloé Cherchyk and Sol Berruezo Pichon-Rivière presenting Mamá at the Berlinale 2020

Mamá, Mamá, Mamá is the debut feature from Argentine director Sol Berruezo Pichon-Rivière based on her own screenplay, which was shown in the 2020 edition of the Berlin International Film Festival. The movie stars Agustina Milstein, Chloé Cherchyk, Camila Zolezzi, Matilde Creimer Chiabrando and Siumara Castillo.

== Plot ==
"Based on an unfortunate event - a little girl drowns in the pool at home - the film shows her twelve-year-old sister Cleo coping with the loss with her three cousins in a world without adults."

== Cast ==
- Agustina Milstein...Cleo
- Chloé Cherchyk...Nerina
- Camila Zolezzi...Manuela
- Matilde Creimer Chiabrando...Leoncia
- Siumara Castillo...Aylín
- Vera Fogwill...Tía
- Jennifer Moule...Madre
- Shirley Giménez...Karen
- Ana María Monti...Abuela
- Florencia González...Erín

== Reception ==
Paraná Sendrós in Ámbito Financiero wrote of the film: "Delicate, suggestive, barely sixty five minutes long, this little play weaves together the experiences of four girls during two very special days, following a misfortune whose details we will understand little by little... two men who are putting up the pool fence... without intervening, they watch what is happening."
