= María Isabel Díaz Lago =

Cuban actress (born 1964)

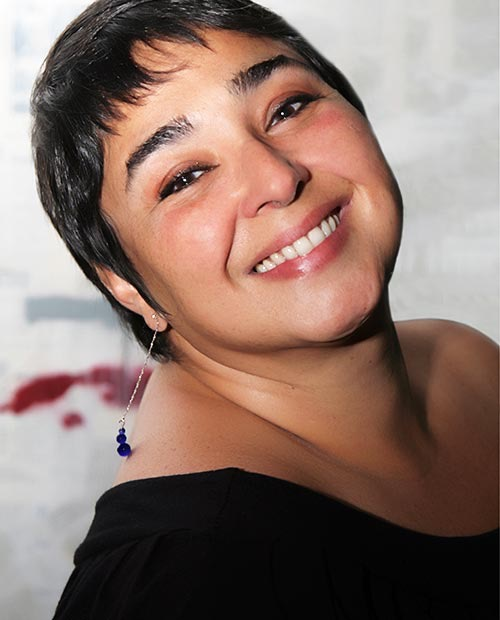
- Born: 4 July 1964 (age 62); Havana, Cuba
- Education: Instituto Superior de Arte
- Occupation: Actress

María Isabel Díaz Lago (born 4 July 1964) is a Cuban actress. A graduate of the Instituto Superior de Arte, her first film role was in Una novia para David (1985). She became the first Cuban "Almodóvar girl", appearing in his 2006 film Volver. On television, she is best known for her role as Soledad "Sole" Núñez Hurtado on the prison crime drama Locked Up (2015-2019).

== Biography ==
María Isabel Díaz Lago was born in Havana on 4 July 1964. During her pre-university studies, she joined the school's theater group and participated in various theater festivals. She also appeared in a play by the Bertolt Brecht Group, Rampa arriba, rampa abajo.

In 1982, she began attending the Instituto Superior de Arte, and the same year she was cast in the play La Rueda de Casino, directed by Armando Suárez del Villar. She also auditioned for the opera Donde crezca el amor. Despite her young age, she was offered the character of the mother, a role in which she acted and sang under the musical direction of baritone Hugo Marcos and the general direction of Armando Suárez del Villar. The opera premiered in the Avellaneda room of the National Theatre of Cuba, and had a long run.

While still attending school, she was selected to star in the film Una novia para David, a script by Senel Paz directed by Orlando Rojas. Alternating her incipient film career with schoolwork under the supervision of teacher Vicente Revuelta, she premiered La Historia de un Caballo and Galileo Galilei with the Teatro Estudio group at the Hubert de Blanck theater.

As a fresh graduate in 1987, she made some appearances on telenovelas and a primetime variety show. From that point on, she alternated work in theater (in plays such as Al que le toco le tocó, Sibila mi amor, and La querida de enramada), films (such as Hello Hemingway, Papeles Secundarios, El plano, Melodrama, and Hasta la victoria siempre), and television series (such as Por amor, Damasco rojo, and La pícara cocinera).

In 1996, she moved to Spain, where she appeared on television series such as Javier ya no vive solo, Policías, and Aída. She also worked with film directors such as Manuel Gutiérrez Aragón on the film Cosas que dejé en la Habana, Javier Rebollo on Locos por el sexo, the Ulloa brothers on Pudor, and Pedro Almodóvar on Volver, where she plays Regina, a friend of the main character played by Penélope Cruz.

In addition, from 2003 to 2006, she participated in the staging of Real Women Have Curves with the Basque company Ados Teatroa, touring throughout Spain, and with two seasons in Madrid and Barcelona.

Other films in which she appeared were Radio Love, La Mala, Masala, Un rey en la Habana, Tres años en el paraíso, Frutas en el café, Stones, Las noches de Constantinopla, Apocalypto, and The Argentine, the latter directed by Steven Soderbergh and starring Benicio del Toro. She also participated in Holy Camp!, directed by Javier Calvo and Javier Ambrossi, released in 2017.

For from 2010 to 2015, she lived in Miami and was part of the "couch team" of the Ana María Polo program Caso Cerrado.

Her career got a major boost when she was cast in the popular prison drama Locked Up, playing Sole, one of the main inmates.

== Awards ==
María Isabel Díaz Lago was named Best Actress in a Feature Film at the 2013 Miami Life Awards for Neuralgia.

For her role on Locked Up, she received an Ondas Award for Best Female Performance (along with the rest of the female cast) in 2015, and in 2017 she was nominated for Best Supporting Actress at the Spanish Actors Union Awards. In 2020, she received an award at the Filming Italy Sardenga Festival.

== Roles ==
=== Film ===
- Una novia para David (1985)
- Papeles Secundarios (1989)
- La vida en Rosa (1989)
- Hello Hemingway (1990)
- Fortuna lo que has querido (1991)
- El plano (1993)
- Melodrama (1995)
- Calor... y celos (1996)
- Hasta la victoria siempre (1998)
- Las noches de Constantinopla (2001)
- Stones (2002)
- Frutas en el café (2003)
- Tres años en el paraíso (2005)
- Locos por el sexo (2005)
- Un rey en la Habana (2005)
- Apocalypto (2006)
- Volver (2006)
- Pudor (2007)
- Masala (2007)
- La Mala (2007)
- Radio Love (2007)
- The Argentine (2007)
- Neuralgia (2011)
- Crossing Moments (2012)
- Un otoño sin Berlín (2015)
- Holy Camp! (2017)
- The Extraordinary Journey of Celeste Garcia (2018)

=== Television ===
- Damasco rojo (1987)
- Por amor (1988)
- La semilla escondida (1988)
- Conflictos-Sinflictos (1990)
- Gracias Doctor (1990)
- Enma, la mujer marcada (1990)
- Konrad, el niño que… (1990)
- Entre mamparas (1996)
- Gabriel en La Habana (1995–1996)
- Carvalho (1998)
- Abogados (2001)
- Hospital Central (2001)
- Compañeros (2001)
- Periodistas (2001)
- Javier ya no vive solo (2001–2002)
- Policías (2003-05)
- El Comisario (2003–2005)
- Planta 25 (2007)
- Aída (2008)
- Locked Up (2015–2019)
- El Continental (2018)
- Secretos de Estado (2019)
- El último show (2020)
- Patria (2020)
- Smiley (2022)

=== Children's and entertainment shows ===
- La pícara cocinera (1986)
- La hora de las brujas (1991–1994)
- Pocholo y su pandilla (1993–1994)
- El club de la comedia (2002, 2015)

=== Theater ===
- Donde crezca el amor (1983–1885), National Theatre of Cuba
- Ha llegado un inspector (1983), Bertolt Brecht Group
- Galileo Galilei (1984), Grupo de Teatro Estudio
- La historia de un caballo (1985), Grupo de Teatro Estudio
- Yerma (1985), Grupo de Teatro Estudio
- Casa de muñecas (1986), Grupo de Teatro Estudio
- Cuentos del Decamerón (1987), Grupo de Teatro Estudio
- La querida de Enramada (1987), Grupo de Teatro Rita Montaner
- Burgueses (1988), Grupo de Teatro Rita Montaner
- Al que le tocó, le tocó (1989–1993), Grupo de Teatro Rita Montaner
- Sibila, mi amor (1992), Grupo de Teatro Rita Montaner
- La cueva (1995), Grupo de Teatro El Público
- Los ciervos (1995), Grupo de Teatro El Público
- La boda (1995), Grupo de Teatro El Público
- Manteca (1998), Cía. Macorina
- Real Women Have Curves (2003–2006), Ados Teatroa
- A Doll's House, Part 2 (2018), Teatro Municipal Pedro Muñoz Seca
