= Luz Gabás =

Spanish novelist

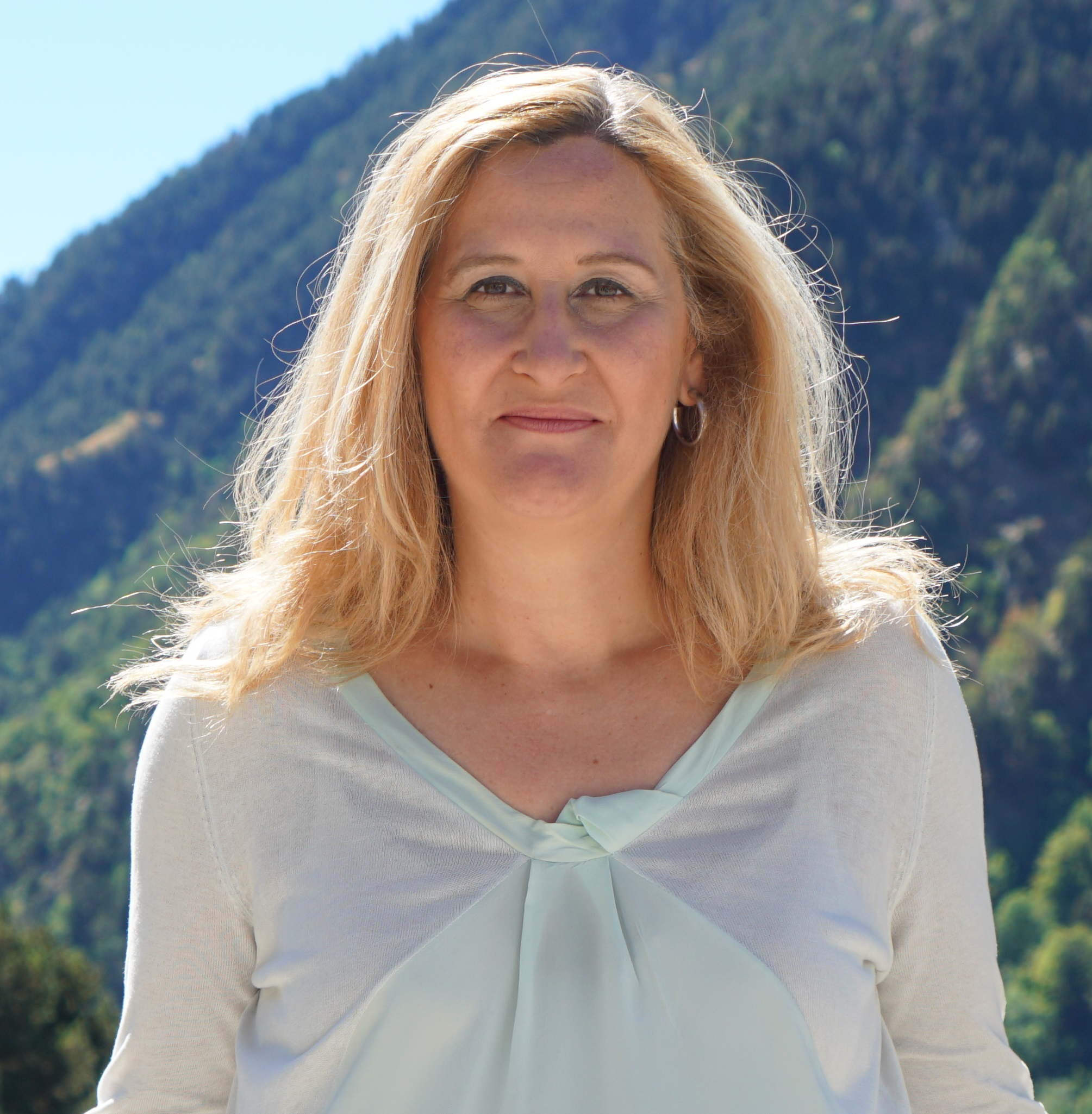
Luz Gabás in 2017

Maria Luz Gabás Ariño (born 1968) is a Spanish novelist and politician, best known for her novels Palmeras en la nieve (2012), Regreso a tu play (2014), Como fuego en el hielo (2017), El latido de la tierra (2019) and Lejos de Luisiana (2022), Premio Planeta winner in the same year.

A member of the right-wing People's Party (PP), she served as the mayor of Benasque from 2011 to 2015.

The screenplay for the 2015 Spanish-language film Palmeras en la nieve is based on Gabás' novel.
