= Star Channel (Spanish TV channel) =

- Country: Spain
- Broadcast area: Spain, Andorra, Morocco, Algeria, Gibraltar, Equatorial Guinea

Ownership
- Owner: The Walt Disney Company Iberia S.L.
- Parent: The Walt Disney Company Spain

History
- Launched: June 1, 2001; 25 years ago
- Former names: Fox (2001-2024)

Links
- Website: www.starchannel.es

Final logo as Fox, used from 2019 to 2024

Star Channel is a Spanish general entertainment pay television channel owned and operated by the local subdivision of the Iberian arm of the EMEA division of the Walt Disney Company. The Launched as Fox on 1 June 2001, it became the first Fox-branded channel available in Europe after Fox Kids; The channel broadcasts American imports with Spanish dubbing and/or subtitles.

On 11 March, 2024, it became the final channel to rebrand to Star Channel, which completed the discontinuation of the "Fox" channel brand internationally due to it still being owned by Fox Corporation, the successor to the Disney-acquired 21st Century Fox.

== Programming ==
=== Current ===
- 9-1-1
- Blue Bloods
- Boston Blue
- Bones
- Bull
- CSI: Crime Scene Investigation
- CSI: Vegas
- CIA
- FBI: Most Wanted
- High Potential
- The Irrational
- Law & Order
- NCIS: Hawaiʻi
- Paradise
- RJ Decker
- The Rookie: Feds
- The Simpsons
- Station 19
- Tracker
- The Walking Dead
- Will Trent
- Watson

=== Former ===
- 90210
- 9-1-1: Lone Star
- Ally McBeal
- American Dad!
- American Horror Story
- Batman
- Better off Ted
- Brothers & Sisters
- Body of Proof
- The Booth
- Boston Legal
- Buffy the Vampire Slayer
- Burn Notice
- Californication
- Chicago Hope
- The Cleaner
- The Cleveland Show
- Close to Home
- Cold Case
- Crash Palace
- Crusoe
- Deadwood
- The Deep End
- The Defenders
- Defying Gravity
- Desperate Housewives
- Dexter
- Dharma & Greg
- Dirt
- Dollhouse
- Eli Stone
- The Ex List
- Family Guy
- The Forgotten
- Futurama
- The Gates
- Generation Kill
- Ghost Whisperer
- Gilmore Girls
- The Glades
- Glee
- The Good Wife
- Grey's Anatomy
- Hawaii Five-0
- Head Case
- House
- How I Met Your Mother
- In Treatment
- Joey
- Journeyman
- Kings
- K-Ville
- Las Vegas
- Lie to Me
- Life Unexpected
- Lipstick Jungle
- The Listener
- Lost
- Lou Grant
- Malcolm in the Middle
- M*A*S*H
- Melrose Place
- Men in Trees
- Mental
- Mentes en Shock
- Mercy
- Miami Medical
- Modern Family
- Moonlight
- My Generation
- My Name Is Earl
- The Nanny
- NCIS: Los Angeles
- NYPD Blue
- The O.C.
- Parenthood
- Party of Five
- Picket Fences
- The Practice
- The Pretender
- Prison Break
- Private Practice
- Raising Hope
- Revenge
- The Riches
- The River
- Roswell
- Saving Grace
- Secret Diary of a Call Girl
- Shark
- Shooter
- The Simple Life
- Six Feet Under
- Smallville
- Sons of Tucson
- The Sopranos
- Standoff
- Suddenly Susan
- True Lies
- Tú también lo harías
- Two Guys and a Girl
- The Unit
- Veronica's Closet
- White Collar
- Will & Grace
- Women's Murder Club
- The X-Files
