= Neox Fan Awards 2012 =

Spanish entertainment awards ceremony

1st Neox Fan Awards
- Date: October 23, 2012
- Site: Teatro La Latina, Madrid
- Hosted by: Arturo Valls & Patricia Conde
- Organized by: Atresmedia

Television coverage
- Channel: Neox
- Ratings: 2.1%

This was the first edition of the Neox Fan Awards, created by Atresmedia and Fanta for teenage audiences to honor the best of the year in films, television, music and sports. The show featured live performances by La Oreja de Van Gogh and Auryn.

Also, a contest was held amongst every fan who voted for the awards. The winner, Carla Martín, was given the chance to present one of the awards alongside Berta Collado.

== Awards ==
=== Film ===
Best Spanish film
Winner	Finalists
Tengo ganas de ti	Ghost Graduation; Unit 7; REC 3: Genesis; Winning Streak
Best Spanish film actor of the year
Winner	Finalists
Mario Casas (Tengo ganas de ti)	Àlex Monner (Els Nens Salvatges); Álvaro Cervantes (Sex of Angels); Maxi Iglesias (El secreto de los 24 escalones); Raúl Arévalo (Ghost Graduation)
Best Spanish film actress of the year
Winner	Finalists
Blanca Suárez (Winning Streak)	Alexandra Jiménez (Ghost Graduation); Clara Lago (Tengo ganas de ti); Inma Cuesta (Unit 7); María Valverde (Tengo ganas de ti)

=== Music ===
Best Spanish song of the year
Winner	Finalists
Pablo Alborán - Te He Echado de Menos	David Bustamante - Como tú ninguna; Pol 3.14 - Lo que no ves; Estopa - Me quedaré; Dani Martín - 16 añitos
Best Spanish solo act
Winner	Finalists
Pablo Alborán	Dani Martín; David Bustamante; Juan Magan; Rosa López
Best Spanish group
Winner	Finalists
Auryn	Estopa; La Oreja de Van Gogh; Melocos; Pignoise
Best flirting song
Winner	Finalists
Auryn - Don't Give Up My Game	José de Rico & Henry Mendez - Rayos de sol; LMFAO - Sexy and I Know It; Adele - Someone like You; David Guetta & Sia - Titanium

=== Television ===
Best television programme
Winner	Finalists
El Hormiguero	Ahora caigo; El club de la comedia; El Número Uno; Tu cara me suena
Best television host
Winner	Finalists
Arturo Valls (Ahora caigo)	Anna Simon (Otra movida); Carlos Sobera (Atrapa un millón); Florentino Fernández (Otra movida); Pablo Motos (El Hormiguero)
Best television series
Winner	Finalists
El Barco	Gran Hotel; Los Protegidos; The Simpsons; Polseres vermelles
Best television series actor
Winner	Finalists
Luis Fernández (Los protegidos)	Àlex Monner (Polseres vermelles); Álvaro Cervantes (Luna, el misterio de Calenda); Mario Casas (El Barco); Yon González (Gran Hotel)
Best television series actress
Winner	Finalists
Irene Montalà (El Barco)	Ana Fernández (Los protegidos); Blanca Suárez (El Barco); María León (Con el culo al aire); Marta Torné (Los protegidos)

=== Sports ===
Pro of the year
Winner	Finalists
Iker Casillas	Andrés Iniesta; Fernando Alonso; Mireia Belmonte; Rafael Nadal

=== Neox awards ===
Best kiss of the year
Winner	Finalists
Ana Fernández and Luis Fernández (Los protegidos)	Amaia Salamanca and Yon González (Gran Hotel); Blanca Suárez and Mario Casas (El Barco); Clara Lago and Mario Casas (Tengo ganas de ti); Lucía Guerrero and Álvaro Cervantes (Luna, el misterio de Calenda)
Best Neox character
Winner	Finalists
Florentino Fernández	Angy Fernández; Pablo Ibáñez "El Hombre de Negro"; Mario Vaquerizo; Sheldon Cooper
Best body of the year
Winner	Finalists
David Bustamante	Cristina Pedroche; Hugo Silva; Paula Echevarría; Sergio Ramos
Best tweet
Winner	Finalists
Paco León	Berto Romero; Dani Mateo; Jordi Évole; Miki Nadal

=== Fanta awards ===
"A tomar Fanta" moment of the year
Winner	Finalists
Enrique Núñez	Irene Albero; Aitana Zubeldia; Cristina Moya; Inma Cano
Best laugh
Winner	Finalists
Sergio Iglesias	Enrique Tomás Núñez; Andreu Porcar; Jesús Rodrigues; José de Jesús Peña Peña
Idea of the year
Iván Hervías, Sergio Pascual and Marcos Ochoa (2012 Google Science Fair winners)
