= Neox Fan Awards 2013 =

Awards ceremony

2nd Neox Fan Awards
- Date: September 24, 2013
- Site: Palacio Municipal de Congresos, Madrid
- Hosted by: Arturo Valls & Anna Simon
- Organized by: Atresmedia

Television coverage
- Channel: Neox
- Ratings: 3.2%

This was the second edition of the Neox Fan Awards, created by Atresmedia and Fanta for teenage audiences to honor the best of the year in films, television, music and sports. The show featured live performances by Abraham Mateo, Rasel & Jadel, Chenoa and Auryn. Also, show hosts Anna Simon and Arturo Valls appeared in disguise as Christina Aguilera and Pitbull, performing a rendition of their hit Feel This Moment.

== Awards ==
=== Film ===
Best Spanish film
Winner	Finalists
La mula	Combustión; The End; I'm So Excited; Los Últimos Días
Best Spanish film actor of the year
Winner	Finalists
Mario Casas (La mula)	Hugo Silva (The Body); Marc Clotet (La estrella); Miguel Ángel Silvestre (Alacrán enamorado); Raúl Arévalo (I'm So Excited)
Best Spanish film actress of the year
Winner	Finalists
Clara Lago (The End)	Aura Garrido (The Body); María Castro (Combustión); María Valverde (La mula); Paula Echevarría (Vulnerables)

=== Music ===
Best song of the year
Winner	Finalists
Auryn - Heartbreaker	Taylor Swift - 22; One Direction - Kiss You; Melendi - Lágrimas desordenadas; Juan Magan - Mal de amores
Best Spanish solo act
Winner	Finalists
Pablo Alborán	Chenoa; Juan Magan; Melendi; Mónica Naranjo
Best Spanish group
Winner	Finalists
Auryn	Efecto Pasillo; La Oreja de Van Gogh; Maldita Nerea; Pignoise
Best flirting song
Winner	Finalists
Pablo Alborán - Tanto	David Bustamante - Cerca de mi piel; James Arthur - Impossible; Cali & El Dandee - No digas nada; Efecto Pasillo - No importa que llueva

=== Television ===
Best television programme
Winner	Finalists
Tu cara me suena	Ahora caigo; El club de la comedia; El Hormiguero; Alaska y Mario
Best television host
Winner	Finalists
Arturo Valls (Ahora caigo)	Anna Simon (Así nos va); Manel Fuentes (Tu cara me suena); Florentino Fernández (Así nos va); Pablo Motos (El Hormiguero)
Best television series
Winner	Finalists
Con el culo al aire	El Barco; Gran Hotel; The Simpsons; El secreto de Puente Viejo
Best television series actor
Winner	Finalists
Mario Casas (El Barco)	Jordi Coll (El secreto de Puente Viejo); Raúl Fernández (Con el culo al aire); Luis Fernández (Fenómenos); Yon González (Gran Hotel)
Best television series actress
Winner	Finalists
María León (Con el culo al aire)	Macarena García (Luna, el misterio de Calenda); Blanca Suárez (El Barco); Megan Montaner (Gran Hotel); Carmen Ruiz (Con el culo al aire)

=== Neox awards ===
Star of the year
Winner	Finalists
Pablo Ibáñez "El Hombre de Negro"	Iñaki Miramón & Toni Acosta; Pepe Reina; Trancas, Barrancas & Petancas; Vicente del Bosque
Best kiss of the year
Winner	Finalists
Àngel Llàcer and David Bustamante (Tu cara me suena)	Amaia Salamanca and Yon González (Gran Hotel); Jordi Coll and Loreto Mauleón (El secreto de Puente Viejo); María León and Raúl Fernández (Con el culo al aire); Mario Casas and María Valverde (La mula)
Best Neox character
Winner	Finalists
Bart Simpson	Angy Fernández; Mario Vaquerizo; Roko; Trancas, Barrancas & Petancas
Best body of the year
Winner	Finalists
Anna Simon	David Bustamante; Mario Casas; Paula Echevarría; Sergio Ramos
Most attractive couple
Winner	Finalists
Alaska & Mario Vaquerizo	David Bustamante & Paula Echevarría; Luis Fernández & Ana María Polvorosa; Miguel Ángel Silvestre & Blanca Suárez; Mario Casas & María Valverde
Best Neox Kidz series
Winner	Finalists
Zoey 101	Angry Birds Toons; The Fairly OddParents; Crayon Shin-chan; Star Wars: The Clone Wars
Most talked about show guests on Twitter
Auryn
