= Pepa Rus =

Spanish actress

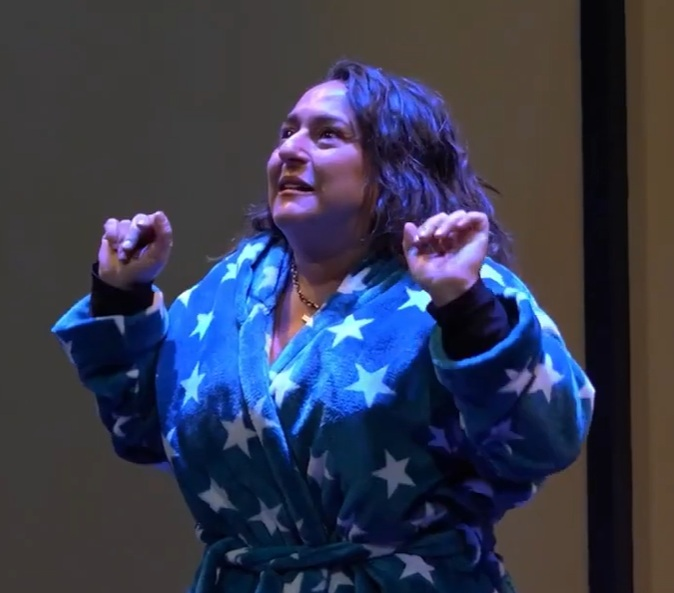
- Born: Josefa Rus; 6 October 1985 (age 40); Chiclana de la Frontera, Spain
- Occupations: Actress, humorist, singer
- Years active: 2007–present

Josefa "Pepa" Rus (born 6 October 1985) is a Spanish actress, humorist, and singer known for having played the role of Inmaculada "Macu" Colmenero on the TV series Aída.

== Biography ==
In mid–2007, Pepa Rus joined the secondary cast of the series Aída, playing the role of Mauricio's young niece Inmaculada "Macu" Colmenero, in her television debut. Regarding this, Rus commented: "It came to me by surprise. I found out on the bus when I was going to Seville to see my family. I dedicated myself to see all the chapters of 7 vidas and the first seasons of Aida."

Subsequently, from 2008 until the end of the series in 2010, she starred in the role of Berta, a girl recently arrived in the city, in the series Maitena: Estados alterados. In 2010, she made her film debut, playing Pepi in the film La mula, where she shared the screen with Mario Casas, María Valverde, and Secun de la Rosa.

In 2015, she joined the series Gym Tony, where she played Secundina "Secun" Garcia, a complaining neighbor who lives above the gym and who continually threatens Tony with reporting him. In 2017 she again played Secundina García in the spin-off Gym Tony LC.

In theater she has participated in the plays Insolación (2015) and A media luz los tres (2016), by Miguel Mihura.

== Acting roles ==
=== Film ===
Year	Title	Role	Notes
2010	La mula	Josefa "Pepi"	Supporting role

=== Television ===
Year	Title	Role	Channel	Notes	Episodes
2007–2014	Aída	Inmaculada "Macu" Colmenero	Telecinco	Lead role	134
2008–2010	Maitena: Estados alterados	Berta	Cuatro	Lead role	80
2013	The Time in Between	Francisca "Paquita"	Antena 3	Minor role	2
2015–2016	Gym Tony	Secundina "Secun" García	Cuatro	Lead role	269
2016	Lo que escondían sus ojos	Matilde	Telecinco	Lead role	4
2017–	La que se avecina	Clara	Telecinco	Supporting role	4
2017	Gym Tony LC	Secundina "Secun" García	Cuatro	Lead role	60
2017	Morocco: Love in Times of War	Gloria Montellano	Antena 3	Supporting role	4

==== Guest appearances ====
Year	Title	Channel	Notes
2011	El club de la comedia	LaSexta	
2015–2017	Me resbala	Antena 3	
2015	Los Gipsy Kings	Cuatro	
2017	El gran reto musical	TVE	
2017	MasterChef Celebrity	TVE	

=== Theater ===
Year	Title	Role
2015–2016	Insolación	
2016	A media luz los tres	
2017	Un chico de revista	
2017	El curso de tu vida	Director

== Discography ==
=== Singles ===
- 2011: "Lore, Lore, Macu, Macu"
