= Jordi Bosch =

Spanish actor

- Born: Jordi Bosch i Palacios; 18 December 1956 (age 68); Mataró, Barcelona, Spain
- Years active: 1981–present

Jordi Bosch i Palacios (born 1956 in Mataró, Spain) is a Spanish actor.

== Theatre ==
- 1981 – "Mort accidental d'un anarquista", by Dario Fo. Dir. Pere Planella. Teatre Regina and Villarroel Teatre, Barcelona
- 1983 – "Advertència per a embarcacions petites", by Tennessee Williams. Dir. Carlos Gandolfo. Teatre Lliure, Barcelona
- 1983 – "L'hèroe", by Santiago Rusiñol. Dir. Fabià Puigserver. Teatre Lliure i Festival del Grec, Barcelona
- 1983 – "Al vostre gust", by William Shakespeare. Dir. Lluís Pasqual. Teatre Lliure, Barcelona
- 1984 – "La flauta màgica", by Emanuel Schikaneder. Dir. Fabià Puigserver. Teatre Lliure, Barcelona
- 1985 – "Un dels últims vespres del carnaval", by Carlo Goldoni. Dir. Lluís Pasqual. Teatre Lliure, Barcelona
- 1986 – "Fulgor i mort de Joaquín Murieta", by Pablo Neruda. Dir. Fabià Puigserver. Teatre Lliure, Barcelona
- 1986 – "El tango de don Joan", by Quim Monzó and Jérôme Savary. Dir. Jérôme Savary. Teatre Lliure, Barcelona
- 1987 – "30 d'abril", by Joan Oliver. Dir. Pere Planella. Teatre Lliure, Barcelona
- 1987 – "El muntaplats", by Harold Pinter. Dir. Carme Portacelli. Teatre Lliure, Barcelona
- 1987 – "Lorenzaccio, Lorenzaccio", by Alfred de Musset. Dir. Lluís Pasqual. Teatre Lliure, Barcelona
- 1988 – "La bona persona de Sezuan", by Bertolt Brecht. Dir. Fabià Puigserver. Mercat de les Flors, Barcelona
- 1988 – "Titànic-92", by Guillem-Jordi Graells. Dir. Pere Planella. Teatre Lliure, Barcelona
- 1989 – "Les noces de Fígaro", by Pierre Beaumarchais. Dir. Fabià Puigserver. Teatre Lliure, Barcelona
- 1989 – "Set escenes de Hamlet", by Benet Casablancas. Dir. Josep Pons. Teatre Lliure, Barcelona
- 1989 – "El viatge (o els cadàvers exaquisits)", by Manuel Vázquez Montalbán. Dir. Ariel García Valdés. Teatre Romea, Barcelona
- 1990 – "Els gegants de la muntanya", by Luigi Pirandello. Dir. Xicu Masó. Teatre Lliure, Barcelona
- 1990 – "Sinfonietta – L'arca de Noé", by Benjamin Britten. Dir. Josep Pons. Sant Felip Neri Church, Barcelona
- 1990 – "Capvespre al jardí", by Ramon Gomis. Dir. Lluís Pasqual. Teatre Lliure, Barcelona
- 1990 – "Restauració", by Eduardo Mendoza. Dir. Ariel García Valdés. Teatre Romea, Barcelona
- 1991 – "Bala perduda", by Lluís Elias. Dir. Xavier Berraondo. TVC, Barcelona
- 1991 – "Història d'un soldat", by Charles Ferdinand Ramuz. Dir. Lluís Homar and Josep Pons. Teatre Lliure, Barcelona
- 1991 – "Timon d'Atenes", by William Shakespeare. Dir. Ariel Garcia Valdés. Teatre Lliure, Barcelona
- 1992 – "El parc", by Botho Strauss. Dir. Carme Portacelli. Teatre Lliure, Barcelona
- 1992 – "El desengany", by Francesc Fontanella. Dir. Domènech Reixach. Teatre Romea, Barcelona
- 1993 – "La guàrdia blanca", by Mikhaïl Bulgàkov. Dir. Pavel Khomsky. Teatre Romea, Barcelona
- 1993 – "Roberto Zucco", by Bernard-Marie Koltès. Dir. Lluís Pasqual. Palau de l'Agricultura, Barcelona
- 1993 – "Some enchanted evening", by Irving Berlin, Leonard Bernstein, George Gershwin, Cole Porter and Stephen Sondheim. Dir. Josep Pons. Teatre Lliure, Barcelona
- 1994 – "El barret de cascavells", by Luigi Pirandello. Dir. Lluís Homar. Teatre Lliure, Barcelona
- 1994 – "Las bodas de Fígaro", by Pierre Beaumarchaisanton. Dir. Fabià Puigserver. Teatro La Comedia, Madrid
- 1995 – "Arsènic i puntes de coixí", by Joseph Kesselring. Dir. Anna Lizaran. Teatre Lliure, Barcelonala, Lluís Soler, Jordi Torras, Artur Trias
- 1995 – "Els bandits", by Friedrich von Schiller. Dir. Lluís Homar. Mercat de les Flors, Barcelona
- 1995 – "Viatge a Califòrnia", by Toni Cabré. Dir. Toni Cabré. Teatre Romea, Barcelona
- 1996 – "Lear o el somni d'una actriu", by William Shakespeare. Dir. Ariel Garcia Valdés. Teatre Lliure, Barcelona
- 1996 – "El temps i l'habitació", by Botho Strauss. Dir. Lluís Homar. Teatre Romea, Barcelona
- 1997 – "Zowie", by Sergi Pompermayer. Dir. Lluís Homar. Teatre Lliure, Barcelona
- 1998 – "Morir", by Sergi Belbel. Dir. Sergi Belbel. Teatre Romea, Barcelona
- 1998 – "Poetry reading: Miquel Martí i Pol". Teatre Lliure, Barcelona
- 1998 – "Fuita", by Jordi Galceran. Dir. Eduard Cortés. Gira per Catalunya
- 1999 – "Cantonada Brossa", by Joan Brossa. Dir. Josep M.Mestres, Josep Montanyès, Lluís Pasqual and Rosa Maria Sardà. Teatre Lliure, Barcelona
- 1999 – "Andorra màgica en vuit dies", by Miquel Desclot. Dir. Gerard Claret. Auditori Nacional d'Andorra (Ordino), Andorra
- 2000 – "Espai pel somni", by Miquel Martí i Pol. Centre Cultural de Sant Cugat i Teatre Lliure, Barcelona
- 2000 – "L'hort dels cirerers", by Anton Chekhov. Dir. Lluís Pasqual. Teatre Lliure, Barcelona
- 2001 – "Novecento, el pianista de l'oceà", by Alessandro Baricco. Dir. Fernando Bernués. Teatre Poliorama, Barcelona
- 2001 – "Improvisacions sobre la Història d'un soldat", by Stravinsky. Sala Beckett, Barcelona
- 2001 – "L'adéu de Lucrècia Borja", by Carles Santos and Joan-Francesc Mira. Dir. Carles Santos. Teatre Lliure, Barcelona
- 2002 – "El llenguatge dels àngels", by Vicenç Ferrer, Gabriel García Márquez, Goethe, Isaias, Nelson Mandela, Pablo Neruda, Palau i Fabre. Dir. Jordi Bosch. Sant Agustí Convent, Barcelona
- 2002/2004 – "Dissabte, diumenge i dilluns", by Eduardo De Filippo. Dir. Sergi Belbel. Teatre Nacional de Catalunya, Barcelona
- 2003 – "Primera plana", by Ben Hecht and Charles McArthur. Dir. Sergi Belbel. Teatre Nacional de Catalunya, Barcelona
- 2004 – "Greus qüestions", by Eduardo Mendoza Garriga. Dir. Rosa Novell. Sala Muntaner, Barcelona
- 2005 – "Fuente Ovejuna", by Lope de Vega. Dir. Ramon Simó. Teatre Nacional de Catalunya, Barcelona
- 2005 – "Fi de partida", by Samuel Beckett. Dir. Rosa Novell. Teatre Grec, Barcelona
- 2006 – "Adreça desconeguda", by Kathrine Kressmann Taylor. Dir. Fernando Bernués. Teatre Bartrina, Reus and Teatre Borràs, Barcelona
- 2006/2007 – "La nit just abans dels boscos", by Bernard-Marie Koltès. Dir. Àlex Rigola. Teatre Municipal, Girona / Teatre Lliure, Barcelona
- 2007 – "Set escenes de Hamlet", by Benet Casablancas. Dir. Santiago Serrate. Teatre Principal, Sabadell
- 2007 – "Play Strindberg", by Friedrich Dürrenmatt. Dir. Georges Lavaudant. Teatro de la Abadía, Madrid
- 2007 – "Un roure", by Tim Crouch. Dir. Roser Batalla. Club Capitol, Barcelona
- 2007 – "Hay que purgar a Totó", by Georges Feydeau. Dir. Georges Lavaudant. Teatro Español, Madrid + tour
- 2008 – "Andorra màgica en vuit dies", by Miquel Desclot. Dir. Gerard Claret. Petit Palau, Barcelona
- 2008 / 2009 – "Monty Python's Spamalot", by Eric Idle. Dir. Tricicle. Teatre Victòria, Barcelona / Teatro Lope de Vega, Madrid
- 2009 – "Garrick" (500 shows), by Tricicle. Dir. Tricicle. Teatre Poliorama, Barcelona
- 2010 / 2011 – "Celebració", by Harold Pinter. Dir. Lluís Pasqual. Teatre de Salt, Girona / Teatre Lliure, Barcelona
- 2011 – "El misantrop", by Molière. Dir. Georges Lavaudant. Teatre Nacional de Catalunya, Barcelona.
- 2011 – "Candide", by Leonard Bernstein. Dir. Paco Mir. Teatro Auditorio San Lorenzo del Escorial, Madrid.
- 2011 / 2012 – "Els jugadors, by Pau Miró. Dir. Pau Miró. Teatre de Salt, Girona / Teatre Lliure, Barcelona
- 2012 – "Quitt", by Peter Handke. Dir. Lluís Pasqual. Teatre Lliure, Barcelona / CDN, Madrid
- 2012 – "La Bête", by David Hirson. Dir. Sergi Belbel. TNC, Barcelona
- 2013 – "Blackbird", by David Harrower. Dir. Lluís Pasqual. Teatre Lliure, Barcelona
- 2013 – "Els feréstecs", by Carlo Goldoni. Dir. Lluís Pasqual. Teatre Lliure, Barcelona
- 2013 – "Tots fem comèdia", by Joaquín Oristrell and Joan Vives. Dir. Joaquín Oristrell. Teatre Poliorama, Barcelona
- 2013 – "El crèdit", by Jordi Galceran. Dir. Sergi Belbel. Sala Villarroel, Barcelona
- 2015 - "El rei Lear", by William Shakespeare. Dir. Lluís Pasqual. Teatre Lliure, Barcelona
- 2015 - "Caiguts del cel", by Sébastien Thiéry. Dir. Sergi Belbel. Teatre Condal, Barcelona
- 2016 - "A teatro con Eduardo", by Eduardo de Filippo. Dir. Lluís Pasqual. Teatre Lliure, Barcelona
- 2017 - "L'ànec salvatge", by Henrik Ibsen. Dir. Julio Manrique. Teatre Lliure, Barcelona
- 2017 - "Infàmia", by Pere Riera. Dir. Pere Riera. Catalonia tour
- 2017 - Adossats, by Ramon Madaula. Dir. Jordi Casanovas. Teatre Romea, Barcelona
- 2018 - Humans, by Stephen Karam. Dir. Mario Gas. Teatre Romea, Barcelona
- 2018 - La partida d'escacs, by Stefan Zweig. Dir. Ivan Morales. Teatre Romea, Barcelona
- 2020 - La cabra, o qui és Sylvia, by Edward Albee. Dir. Ivan Morales. La Villarroel, Barcelona
- 2022 - Final de partida, by Samuel Beckett. Dir. Sergi Belbel. Teatre Romea, Barcelona
- 2022 - Golfus de Roma, by Stephen Sondheim. Dir. Daniel Anglès. Teatre Condal, Barcelona
- 2023 - Tots eren fills meus, by Arthur Miller. Dir. David Selvas. Teatre Lliure, Barcelona
- 2024 - Mort d'un comediant, by Guillem Clua. Dir. Josep Ma Mestres. Teatre de Salt

== Television ==
- 1992/1995 – "Quico, el progre", TV3
- 1993 – "Agència de viatges", TV3
- 1993 – "La Lloll", TV3
- 1994 – "Arnau", TV3
- 1995 – "Estació d'enllaç", TV3
- 1995 – "Pedralbes Centre", TV3
- 1996 – "Nissaga de poder", TV3
- 1999 – "La memòria dels Cargol", TV3
- 1999 – "Junts" (TV-movie), TV3
- 2000 – "Nissaga, l'herència", TV3
- 2000 – "El comisario", T5
- 2000 – "Crims", TV3
- 2001/2003 – "Jet lag", TV3
- 2002 – "Majoria absoluta", TV3
- 2005 – "Abuela de verano", TVE
- 2006 – "Con dos tacones", TVE
- 2007 – "Després de la pluja" (TV-movie), TV3/TVG
- 2007 – "La Via Augusta", TV3
- 2008 – "Lex", Antena 3
- 2010/2011 – "La sagrada família", TV3
- 2010 – "Més dinamita", TV3
- 2012/2013 – "Gran Hotel", Antena 3
- 2013 – "Polònia", TV3

== Cinema ==
- 1989 – "Capità Escalaborns" by Carles Benpar
- 1991 – "La febre d'or" by Gonzalo Herralde
- 1993 – "Monturiol, el senyor del mar" by Francesc Bellmunt
- 1994 – "El perquè de tot plegat" by Ventura Pons
- 1995 – Boca a boca by Manuel Gómez Pereira
- 1996 – "The Good Life" by David Trueba
- 1996 – "De qué se ríen las mujeres" by Joaquin Oristrell
- 2000 – "Carretera y manta" by Alfonso Arandia
- 2001 – "Silencio roto" by Montxo Armendáriz
- 2001 – "Deseo" by Gerardo Vera
- 2006 – "La educación de las hadas" by José Luis Cuerda
- 2006 – "Va a ser que nadie es perfecto" by Joaquín Oristrell
- 2007 – "Barcelona" by Ventura Pons
- 2010 – "Tres metros sobre el cielo" by Fernando González Molina.
- 2011 – "Mil cretins" by Ventura Pons
- 2011 – "23-F" by Chema de la Peña
- 2012 – "Tengo ganas de ti" by Fernando González Molina

== Awards ==
- - from the Theatrical Critic Press of Barcelona season 90 – 91 for the play "Restauració"
- - from the Professional Actors and Directors Association of Catalunya. Best supporting theatre actor season 90–91 for the play "Restauració"
- - National of Catalan Theatre 1994 for the play "El barret de cascavells"
- - from the Theatrical Critic Press of Barcelona season 93–94 for the play "El barret de cascavells"
- - from the Professional Actors and Directors Association of Catalunya. Best cinema actor season 93 – 94 for the movie "El perquè de tot plegat"
- - Butaca-95 best cinema actor for the movie "El perquè de tot plegat"
- - from the Theatrical Critic Press of Barcelona season 98–99, for the play "Cantonada Brossa"
- - Butaca-03 best theatre actor for the play "Dissabte, diumenge, dilluns"

== Bibliography ==
- Marga (1998–2012). "La pàgina d'en Jordi Bosch". web page.
