= The Paramedic =

Spanish thriller film

- Film poster
- Spanish: El practicante
- Directed by: Carles Torras
- Screenplay by: David Desola; Hèctor Hernández Vicens
- Starring: Mario Casas; Déborah François
- Production companies: Babieka Entertainment; Zabriskie Films
- Distributed by: Netflix
- Release date: September 16, 2020
- Country: Spain
- Language: Spanish

The Paramedic (Spanish: El practicante) is a 2020 Spanish psychological thriller film directed by Carles Torra, written by David Desola and Hèctor Hernández Vicens and starring Mario Casas and Déborah François.

Taking place in Barcelona, its plot follows a psychopathic paramedic (Casas) with his girlfriend Vane (François) and a newly acquired disability, as he was rendered paralyzed from the waist down in the wake of an ambulance accident.

The Paramedic was released on September 16, 2020, by Netflix.

== Plot ==
Ángel Hernández is a paramedic who lives with his girlfriend Vanesa (Vane) François. Ángel is unempathetic towards his patients and steals from them, selling the more valuable items to a local fence. At home, he is possessive and controlling towards Vane. The couple is trying for a baby without success. Ángel tells Vane it's her fault and even suggests her inability to get pregnant is psychosomatic. He then takes a fertility test and discovers that he has a low sperm count, but does not tell Vane.

One day, while taking an injured patient to a hospital, the ambulance (driven by his colleague Ricardo) is involved in an accident, and Ángel is left paralyzed from the waist down and uses a wheelchair. He blames Ricardo and is unable to forgive him. His disability puts a strain on his relationship with Vane, and he becomes increasingly paranoid that she is cheating on him. He seems to enjoy berating, mocking, and gaslighting her. Vane works at a call center at night, and Ángel installs spyware on her phone to keep tabs on her.

Via the phone spyware, he overhears a conversation between Vane and her friend, who tells her that Ángel is abusive and that Vane should leave him. When Vane returns home that day, Ángel has cooked her favorite meal and is apologetic about how he has treated her. They try to have sex but do not succeed because Ángel is unable to feel anything. While showering, Vane discovers from his laptop that he has been spying on her. Disgusted, she packs up and leaves for good.

Several months pass, but Ángel is still obsessed with Vane. He stalks her and eventually sees her kissing Ricardo, with whom she has begun a relationship. Later, Ángel observes the couple shopping for baby things and realizes she is pregnant with Ricardo's baby. Ángel meets Vane in the street and tells her that he has boxed up her remaining possessions and asks if she would like to come and pick them up. However, on their arrival at the apartment, Ángel injects Vane, causing her to lose consciousness. When she awakes, she finds herself gagged and tied to a bed. Ángel uses Vane's phone to send Ricardo a message, telling him she does not want to have their baby and asking him not to contact her. Ricardo later approaches Ángel to say he does not believe Vane sent the message and is worried because he can't find her.

Ángel injects Vane with an epidural so that she temporarily loses the use of her legs. He presents her with an engagement ring (actually stolen from one of his former patients) and talks of their future together raising their (Vane's) baby. Vane makes an escape attempt, but he overpowers her. His elderly neighbor hears Vane scream and comes to investigate. When the old man threatens to call the police, Ángel stabs him to death and pays his friend the fence to dispose of the body. Ángel also goes over to Ricardo's house and kills him.

A few days later, the police arrive at Ángel's apartment and advise him that they are investigating Ricardo's death and the disappearance of Vane (whom Ricardo had reported as a missing person). Ángel manages to satisfy the police that he knows nothing about either.

Vane manages to escape while Ángel is out of the apartment. Although with only partial use of her legs, she succeeds in dragging herself down the staircase of the building, but when the lift stops on the landing, Ángel exits. They struggle, but Vane stabs him with a screwdriver, and he falls several flights down the stairwell.

In the final scene, Ángel is in hospital, now completely paralyzed, unable to talk, and breathing through a tube in his throat. Vane appears, fully recovered and visibly pregnant. She tells the helpless Ángel that from now on, she will be taking care of him. His fate is left unknown as Vane wheels him out of the hospital with a sinister smile on her face.

== Cast ==
- Mario Casas as Ángel Hernández
- Déborah François as Vanesa François
- Celso Bugallo as Vicente
- Raúl Jiménez
- Pol Monen
- Gerard Oms
- Guillermo Pfening as Ricardo
- María Rodríguez Soto

== Production ==
The screenplay was penned by Carles Torras, Héctor H. Vicens, and David Desola. The film is a Babieka Entertainment and Zabriskie Films production. Shooting locations in Catalonia included Lleida.

== Release ==
The Paramedic was released on September 16, 2020, by Netflix.

== Reception ==
On the review aggregator website Rotten Tomatoes, 50% of 8 critics' reviews are positive, with an average rating of 5.0/10.

Rubén Romero Santos of Cinemanía rated the film 3½ out of 5 stars, rallying laggards to join the Mario Casas bandwagon, highlighting the transformation experienced by the actor from Three Steps Above Heaven to The Paramedic, in which he plays a "wheelchair-bound inhuman sociopathic demon".

Raquel Hernández Luján of HobbyConsolas rated the film with 80 points ('very good'), deeming it to be "a very successful film with strong performances and a great ending", also praising Casas' acting transformation, while warning that the film is not precisely reinventing the wheel.

== See also ==
- List of Spanish films of 2010
