= Lucho Fernandez (actor) =

Spanish actor

Luis Fernandez
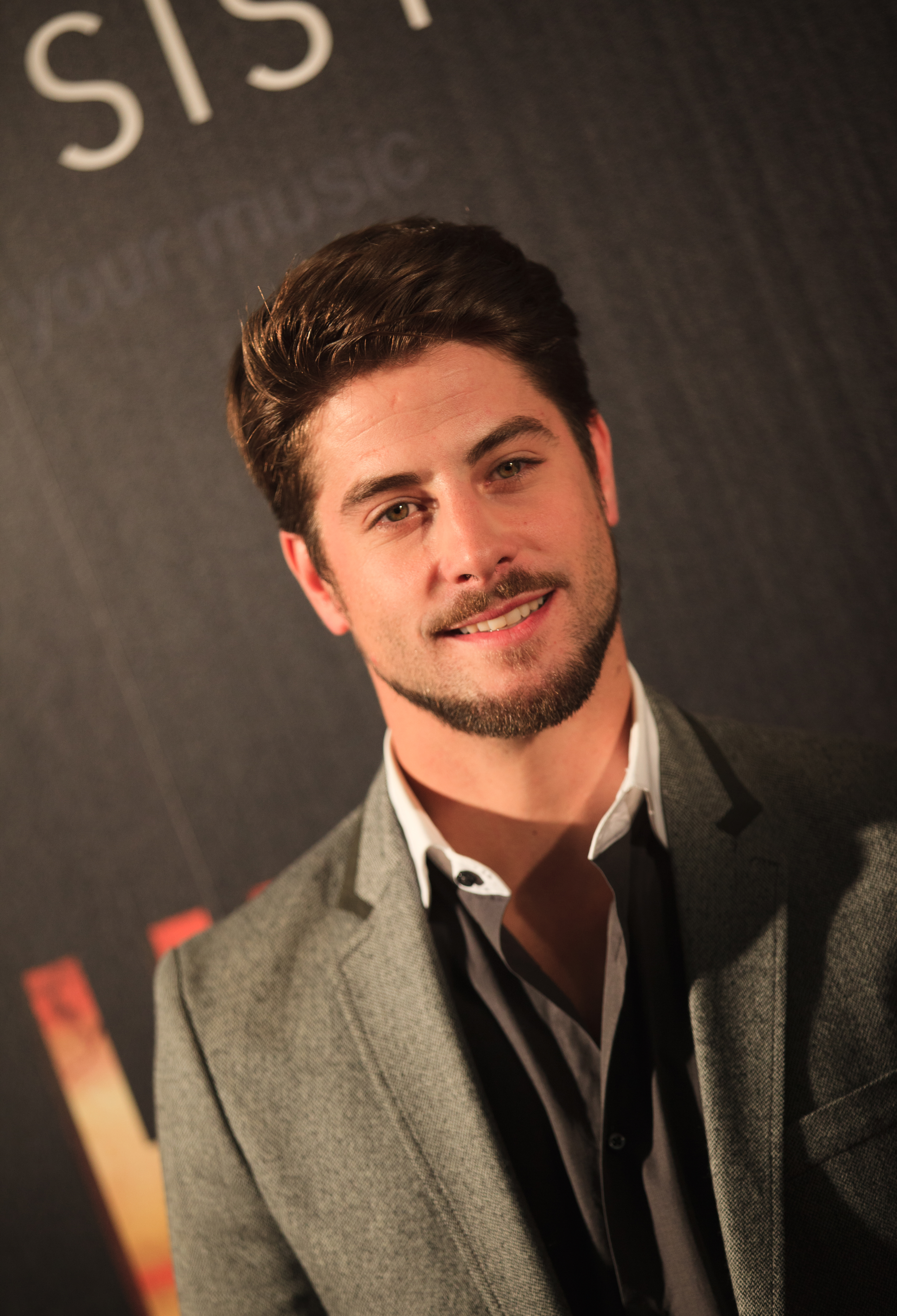
- Fernandez in 2012
- Born: Luis Fernandez Estebanez; 31 December 1984 (age 41); Madrid, Spain
- Occupations: Actor, Celebrity, TV series, Socialite

Luis Fernández, also known as Lucho Fernández or Perla (born 31 December 1984, in Madrid, Spain) is a Spanish actor known for the character of Culebra in the Spanish television series Los protegidos.

== Biography ==
In 2007, Fernandez was in the chorus for the rapper Darmo and appeared in the rapper's music video for the song Mantenlo Ilegal. After seeing Fernandez in the music video, producers of the television series Los Protegidos offered him the role of Culebra, an orphan. He made his film debut as the character of Chino in 2010's Three Steps Above Heaven. In 2011, he appeared in the horror film XP3D. In 2012, Fernandez played a featured character in the television series Fenómenos. In 2013, he appeared in two films : Afterparty from Miguel Larraya, and Barcelona Summer Night.

Fernandez won the award for Best Upcoming Actor at the 2011 Must Awards.

== Personal life ==
In 2011, he had a relationship with the actress Ana Fernández. In 2012 Fernandez had a relationship with the actress Ana Maria Polvorosa, whom he met during the filming of the Fenómenos.

== Filmography ==
Television:

Year	Title	Role	Notes
2010	Física o química	Himself	First episode ("Segunda oportunidad")
2010	Diarios de la webcam	El víbora	First episode
2011	La Gira	Himself	First episodes
2012	la huida	Luis	Main Character
2010—2012	Los protegidos	Ángel Izquierdo "Culebra"/Policarpo "Poli" Castillo	Main Character
2012—2013	Fenómenos	Guillermo "Willy" Azcauri	Main Character
2015	Los nuestros	Daniel Solá	TV

Cinema:

Year	Title	Role	Notes
2010	Tres metros sobre el cielo	Chino	Main Character
2011	XP3D	Carlos	Main Character
2012	Tengo ganas de ti	Chino	Supporting role
2013	Afterparty	Carlos "El Capi"	Main Character
2013	Barcelona, Noches de Verano	Marc	Main Character
2025	Un año y un día	Hugo	

Music Videos:

Year	Title	Role	Notes
2008	«Rebeldes»	Supporting role	
2009	«Mantenlo ilegal»	Main Character	
2009	«El Tiempo Corre»	Supporting role	
2010	«El Elegido»	Main Character	
2010	«Vida Grimey»	Supporting role	
2010	«Evolución (Remix)»	Supporting role	
2010	«What U Tryin' 2 do!?»	Supporting role	Mitx
2011	«Mi vida loca»	MC	
2011	«Cicatrices del pasado»	Main Character	Perla + MRK
2011	«Sangre x odio»	Supporting role	
2012	«Solo nos queda soñar»	Supporting role	

== Awards ==
- Revelación Must! del año (2010)
- Neox Fan Awards (2012) - Mejor actor de serie
- Neox Fan Awards (2012) - Mejor beso con Ana Fernández.
