= The Mule (2013 film) =

- Theatrical release poster
- Spanish: La mula
- Directed by: Michael Radford (Note: The final credits state that the film was directed by an "anonymous director". The footage was largely shot by Michael Radford, with Sebastian Grousset taking over direction duties for the pending scenes after Radford walked away.)
- Screenplay by: Juan Eslava Galán; Michael Radford
- Based on: La mula by Juan Eslava Galán
- Produced by: Alejandra Frade; Bruce St. Clair
- Starring: Mario Casas; María Valverde; Secun de la Rosa; Chiqui Maya; Mingo Ruano; Ignacio Mateos; Tavi García; Eduardo Velasco; Jesús Carroza; Maite Sandoval; Jorge Suquet; Bernardo Rivera; Antonio Gil; Daniel Grao; Pepa Rus; Luis Callejo
- Cinematography: Ashley Rowe; Ángel Luis Fernández
- Edited by: Teresa Font
- Music by: Óscar Navarro
- Release dates: 25 April 2013 (Málaga); 10 May 2013 (Spain)
- Countries: Spain; United Kingdom; Ireland
- Language: Spanish

The Mule (Spanish: La mula) is a 2013 film based on the novel by Juan Eslava Galán of the same name, starring Mario Casas and María Valverde alongside Secun de la Rosa. An infamous litigation about its finances erupted in the last days of shooting in October 2009, pitting British director, co-writer, and producer Michael Radford against Spanish producer Alejandra Frade. A theatrical cut, with Radford having cut ties to it, was eventually released in 2013.

== Plot ==
Starting in the last stages of the Spanish Civil War, the plot follows the mishaps of Rebel faction corporal Juan Castro, who finds a mule in the battlefield. Having the mule and 400 pesetas, Castro tries to woo love interest Conchi.

== Cast ==
- Mario Casas as Juan Castro
- María Valverde as Conchi
- Secun de la Rosa as El Chato
- Chiqui Maya as Antonio
- Mingo Ruano as Amor
- Ignacio Mateos as Jesús
- Tavi García as Cárdenas
- Eduardo Velasco as Sargento Barrionuevo
- Jesús Carroza as Churri
- Maite Sandoval as Doña Concepción
- Jorge Suquet as Alférez Estrella
- Bernardo Rivera as escribiente
- Antonio Gil as Benavides
- Daniel Grao as Sargento Cosme
- Pepa Rus as Pepi
- Luis Callejo as Teniente Coronel Troitiño

== Production ==
The film was originally developed as an international co-production between Madrid's Gheko Films, Andalusia's Gheko Films Sur, Britain's Workhorse Entertainment and Ireland's Subotica Entertainment. The footage was shot in 2009 largely under direction of Michael Radford, with Sebastián Grousset taking over the last days of the filming. A protracted and convoluted legal litigation over the film's finances between Gheko Films' Alejandra Frade and Michael Radford ensued. Shooting locations in Andalusia included Guadix, Andújar, and Montoro.

== Litigation ==
The legal ruckus involved crossed accusations of "libel, lies and career-wrecking malice". According to Radford, Gheko Films' Alejandra Frade refused to sign contracts that may have allowed the film to get funding from the Irish Film Board and the UK Film Council, imperiling the remuneration of the British crew. The Spanish ICAA banned the distribution of the film for 2 years, filing a lawsuit for injuriousness. Alejandra Frade peddled a legal complaint against ICAA director Ignasi Guardans for alleged prevarication, bribery and influence peddling. Gheko Films also peddled another lawsuit against Spanish Under-Secretary for Culture Mercedes Elvira del Palacio Tascón.

After the legal battle turned in favour of Frade, ICAA handed the film its certification in December 2012. In a pyrrhic win, Frade managed to release her cut of the film in 2013, whereas Radford refused to have his name credited, also claiming that Frade was assembling a "rogue film", lamenting that [the film's production] "has been the saddest experience of my life and extremely damaging to me professionally".

== Release ==
After being stuck in a post-production hell for years, the film made its world premiere at the Málaga Film Festival on 25 April 2013. It was released theatrically in Spain on 10 May 2013.

== Reception ==
Carlos Marañón of Cinemanía rated the film 3½ out of 5 stars, writing that, considering that despite glaring continuity editing issues, the film works.

Mirito Torreiro of Fotogramas rated The Mule 3 out of 5 stars, highlighting Mario Casas as the best thing about it, while citing the film's "much improvable" writing as a negative point.

== Accolades ==
Year	Award	Category	Nominee(s)	Result	Ref.
2014	1st Feroz Awards	Best Actor	Mario Casas	Nominated	
2014	28th Goya Awards	Best Original Score	Óscar Navarro	Nominated	

== See also ==
- List of Spanish films of 2013
