= Los nuestros =

- Starring: Hugo Silva; Blanca Suárez; Luis Fernández; Antonio Velázquez; Álvaro Cervantes
- No. of episodes: 6

Release
- Original network: Mediaset España
- Original release: March 2, 2015

Los nuestros is a Spanish suspense action drama TV series, with characters portrayed by Hugo Silva, Blanca Suárez, Luis Fernández, Antonio Velázquez and Álvaro Cervantes. The first season was released in December 2015 by Mediaset España and the second one in the first trimester of 2017.

In Spain, the first season had an audience of 3,649,000 (19.6% share). In France, titled as Les otages du désert, was released on 26 August 2015 on M6 and had an audience of 1.46 million (6.7% share) for the first episode and 1.32 million (8.7%) for the second one.

The second season will be shot in Turkey, Madrid, Almería, the south of Sahara, and Syria.

== Cast ==
=== First season ===
- Hugo Silva as Alberto Sánchez
- Blanca Suárez as Isabel Santana
- Antonio Velázquez as Iván Martín
- Álvaro Cervantes as Tony Serra
- Luis Fernández as Daniel Solá
- Andros Perugorría as Ernesto Lafuente "Wifi"
- Eduardo Lloveras as Miguel Ruíz
- Sergio Torrico as Jony García
- Raúl del Pozo as Mario
- Arlen Garmade as Alejandra
- Hamid Krim as Rashid Ali
- Marina Salas as Desirée "Desi"
- Gorka Lasaosa as Chino
- Tristán Ulloa as Iñaki
- Laia Marull as Montse
- Mónica López as Esposa del embajador español
- Francesc Garrido as Embajador español en Malí
- Daniel Grao as Comandante Torres
- Pedro Casablanc as Coronel Villegas
- Jorge Anegon as Martín
- Ali El Haziz as Hassan
- Marta Nieto as Marta
- Chanel Terrero as Gloria
- Iria del Río as Carmen

=== Second season ===
- Paula Echevarría as Martina Ibáñez
- Rodolfo Sancho as Carlos Román
- Aida Folch as Montse
- Michelle Calvó as Elena
- Stany Coppet as Idris
- Elvira Mínguez as Teniente Coronel Iborra
- Carles Francino as Lucas
- Joel Bosqued as Tomás
- Mateo Conde as Javi
- Gonzalo Kindelán as Leo
- Daniel Ibáñez as Hugo
- David Castillo as Ray
