= Caged Wings =

- Theatrical release poster
- Spanish: Mi soledad tiene alas
- Directed by: Mario Casas
- Screenplay by: Mario Casas; Déborah François
- Produced by: Adrián Guerra; Núria Valls
- Starring: Óscar Casas; Candela González; Farid Bechara; Francisco Boira
- Cinematography: Edu Canet Ciscar
- Edited by: Verónica Callón
- Music by: Zeltia Montes
- Production company: Nostromo Pictures
- Distributed by: Warner Bros. Pictures
- Release dates: 18 August 2023 (Paterna); 25 August 2023 (Spain)
- Country: Spain
- Language: Spanish
- Box office: €1.4 million

Caged Wings, also known as My Loneliness Has Wings, (Spanish: Mi soledad tiene alas) is a 2023 Spanish drama film directed by Mario Casas (in his directorial debut feature) from a screenplay by Casas and Déborah François which stars Óscar Casas and Candela González.

== Plot ==
Upon a botched robbery attempt, young criminal and graffiti artist Dan flees the outskirts of Barcelona to Madrid along with his gang.

== Cast ==
- Óscar Casas as Dan
- Candela González as Vio
- Farid Bechara as Reno
- Francisco Boira
- Marta Bayarri

== Production ==
The screenplay was penned by Mario Casas and Déborah François. The film is a Nostromo Pictures production and it had the participation of Netflix and the backing from ICAA. Shooting locations included Bellvitge, La Mina, and Lavapiés. The film was lensed by Edu Canet and edited by Verónica Callón. Óscar Casas had to lose 8 kg to play his character.

Morad performed the theme "Volar sin alas" for the film.

== Release ==
The film premiered at the Paterna Film Festival on 18 August 2023. Distributed by Warner Bros. Pictures, the film was released theatrically in Spain on 25 August 2023.

== Reception ==
On the review aggregator website Rotten Tomatoes, 71% of 7 critics' reviews are positive, with an average rating of 6.0/10.

Pablo Vázquez of Fotogramas rated the film 4 out of 5 stars, deeming it to be "organic, tumultuous and energetic film, intuitive in its essence", while pointing out that the story that does not precisely shine for its originality.

Luis Martínez of El Mundo rated My Loneliness Has Wings (an "'auto-tune' film" [sic]) 2 out of 5 stars, writing "that the movie copies the forms of the most classic quinqui cinema, but with such a vacuous, exaggerated and false aestheticism that it is dismaying".

Javier Ocaña of El País considered that even if Casas is not telling anything that has not already been done many times, "the visual and sound energy that the film exudes emerges with its light over the few shadows of a very estimable debut".

== See also ==
- List of Spanish films of 2023
