= Bye (film) =

2019 film by Paco Cabezas

- Theatrical release poster
- Spanish: Adiós
- Directed by: Paco Cabezas
- Written by: José Rodríguez; Carmen Jiménez
- Produced by: Enrique López Lavigne
- Starring: Mario Casas; Natalia de Molina; Ruth Díaz
- Cinematography: Pau Esteve Birba
- Edited by: Luis de la Madrid; Miguel A. Trudu
- Music by: Zeltia Montes
- Production companies: Apache Films; Adiós La Película AIE; La Claqueta PC
- Distributed by: Sony Pictures
- Release dates: 26 September 2019 (Zinemaldia); 22 November 2019 (Spain)
- Running time: 111 minutes
- Country: Spain
- Language: Spanish
- Box office: $2,232,821

Bye (Spanish: Adiós) is a 2019 Spanish drama film directed by Paco Cabezas, starring Mario Casas, Natalia de Molina, and Ruth Díaz.

The film was nominated for three Goya Awards.

== Plot ==
Juan is in prison and is granted a temporary release to attend his daughter Estrella's communion. When he arrives in his neighbourhood, Las 3000 Viviendas in Seville, he realises the violence in the streets. The death of his daughter on the day of her communion uncovers a web of police corruption and drug trafficking.

Eli is a female police inspector and she will be in charge of handling the case of the girl's death but she will have to fight against both the mistrust of her colleagues and Juan, who has decided to take the law into his own hands.

== Cast ==
- Mario Casas as Juan
- Natalia de Molina as Triana
- Ruth Díaz as Eli
- Carlos Bardem as Santacana
- Vicente Romero as Andrés
- Mona Martínez as María
- Pilar Gómez as Maravilla
- Consuelo Trujillo as Madre Kempes
- Mariola Fuentes as Vecina Paqui
- Pablo Gómez-Pando as Nando

== Production ==
Bye was produced by Apache Films and Adiós La Película AIE alongside La Claqueta PC, in association with Sony Pictures International Productions and with the participation of RTVE, Movistar+, ICAA, Orange and Junta de Andalucía. It was filmed on location in Seville.

== Release ==
The film was presented in a RTVE gala at the 67th San Sebastián International Film Festival in September 2019. Distributed by Sony Pictures, it was released theatrically in Spain on 22 November 2019.

== Awards ==
| Year | Award | Category | Nominee(s) | Result | Ref. |
|---|---|---|---|---|---|
| 2020 | 7th Feroz Awards | Best Trailer | Miguel Ángel Trudu | Won | |
| 2020 | 7th Feroz Awards | Best Supporting Actress in a Film | Mona Martínez | Nominated | |
| 2020 | 7th Feroz Awards | Best Original Soundtrack | Zeltia Montes | Nominated | |
| 2020 | 75th CEC Medals | Best Supporting Actress | Natalia de Molina | Won | |
| 2020 | 75th CEC Medals | Best Supporting Actress | Mona Martínez | Nominated | |
| 2020 | 75th CEC Medals | Best Editing | Luis de la Madrid, Miguel A. Trudu | Won | |
| 2020 | 75th CEC Medals | Best Music | Zeltia Montes | Nominated | |
| 2020 | 34th Goya Awards | Best Supporting Actress | Natalia de Molina | Nominated | |
| 2020 | 34th Goya Awards | Best Supporting Actress | Mona Martínez | Nominated | |
| 2020 | 34th Goya Awards | Best New Actress | Pilar Gómez | Nominated | |
| 2020 | 32nd Actors and Actresses Union Awards | Best Film Actress in a Minor Role | Mona Martínez | Nominated | |

== See also ==
- List of Spanish films of 2019
