= Marina Salas =

Spanish actress

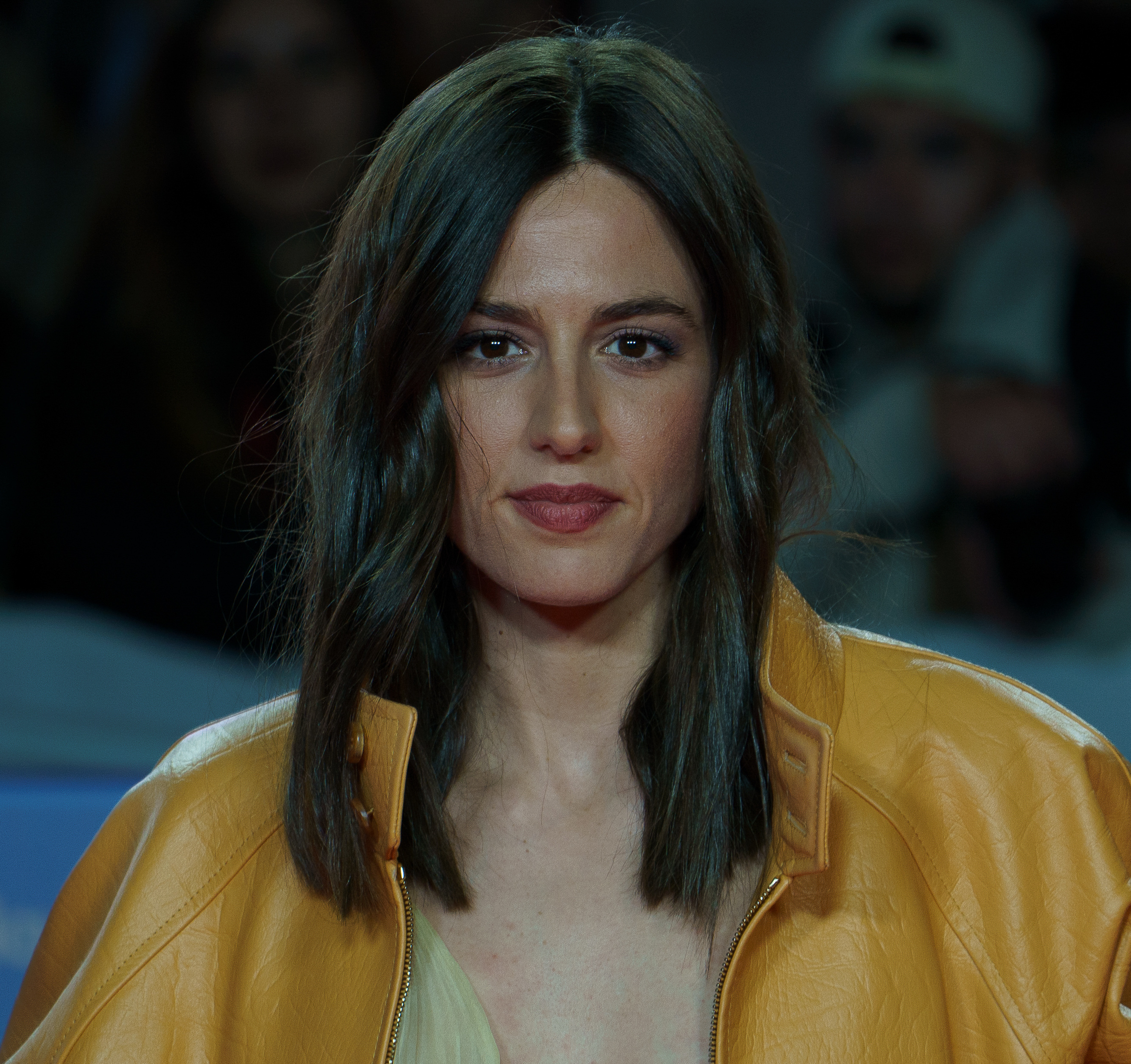
- Salas in 2025
- Born: Marina Salas Rodríguez; 17 October 1988 (age 37); Cornellà de Llobregat, Catalonia, Spain
- Occupation: Actress

Marina Salas Rodríguez (born 17 October 1988) is a Spanish screen and stage actress. She became known for her roles in the television series Hay alguien ahí (2009–10) and El Barco (2011–13) and the box office hits Three Steps Above Heaven (2010) and I Want You (2012).

== Life and career ==
Marina Salas Rodríguez was born in Cornellà de Llobregat on 17 October 1988 to a public servant and a car paint technician.

Her first onscreen appearance was as the character Laia in 2005 in the Catalan soap El cor de la ciutat. She made her feature film debut as an actress in Sin ti (2006). Her television work also includes performances in Los nuestros and Carlos, rey emperador.

She won the Actors and Actresses Union Award for Best Television Actress in a Secondary Role for her work in the miniseries I, Addict (2024).

== Filmography ==
=== Film ===
| Year | Title | Role | Notes | Ref. |
|---|---|---|---|---|
| 2006 | Sin ti | | Feature film debut | |
| 2010 | Tres metros sobre el cielo (Three Steps Above Heaven) | Katina | | |
| 2012 | The Pelayos (Winning Streak) | Vanessa | | |
| 2012 | Tengo ganas de ti (I Want You) | Katina | | |
| 2014 | Por un puñado de besos | Gloria | | |
| 2021 | El cover (The Cover) | Sandra | | |
| 2023 | Saben aquell (Jokes & Cigarettes) | Mari Carmen | | |
| 2024 | Miocardio (Myocardium) | Ana | | |
| 2025 | También esto pasará (This Too Shall Pass) | Blanca | | |
| 2025 | Esmorza amb mi (Join Me for Breakfast) | Carlota | | |
| 2026 | Caminando con el diablo (The Devil Within) | Alicia | | |
| 2026 | Corredora (Runner) | Natàlia | | |
| 2026 | Esta soledad (This Solitude) | | | |

=== Television ===
- Desaparecida (2007–2008)
- El barco
- Hay alguien ahí
- Carlos, rey emperador
- Los nuestros (2015)
- Hache
- Yo, adicto as Lola

=== Short film ===
- Sexo explícito

=== Theatre ===
- Luces de bohemia
