= The Occupant =

2020 Spanish thriller film by David Pastor and Àlex Pastor

- Hogar
- Directed by: David Pastor; Àlex Pastor
- Written by: David Pastor; Àlex Pastor
- Produced by: Adrián Guerra; Núria Valls; Marta Sánchez
- Starring: Javier Gutiérrez; Mario Casas; Bruna Cusí
- Cinematography: Pau Castejón
- Edited by: Martí Roca
- Music by: Lucas Vidal
- Production company: Nostromo Pictures
- Distributed by: Netflix
- Release date: March 25, 2020 (Netflix)
- Running time: 103 minutes
- Country: Spain
- Language: Spanish

The Occupant (Spanish: Hogar) is a 2020 Spanish thriller drama film written and directed by David Pastor and Àlex Pastor.

== Plot ==
The plot revolves around Javier Muñoz (Javier Gutiérrez), a former executive, who is forced to sell his apartment because of unemployment. He becomes obsessed with the new occupants, and begins infiltrating their lives.

== Cast ==
- Javier Gutiérrez as Javier Muñoz
- Mario Casas as Tomás
- Bruna Cusí as Lara
- Ruth Díaz as Marga
- David Ramírez as Damián
- David Selvas as Darío
- David Verdaguer as Raul
- Vicky Luengo as Natalia
- Ernesto Collado as Professor
- Mireia Rey as Actriz
- Josep Maria Alejandre
- Aleida Torrent as Treintañera
- Julia Molins
- Raül Ferre as Lucas

== Release ==
The film was slated for a March 2020 world premiere at the Málaga Spanish Film Festival, but the event was postponed due to the COVID-19 pandemic disruption. It was released on March 25, 2020 on Netflix.

== Reception ==
On review aggregator Rotten Tomatoes, the film holds an approval rating of 61% based on 23 reviews, with an average rating of 5.9/10. The website's critics consensus reads, "Meandering character development undercuts The Occupant's exciting premise, though Javier Gutiérrez's exceptional performance makes the proceedings work."
