= Jorge Anegon =

Spanish actor

Jorge Anegón
- Born: Jorge García Anegón; Principado de Asturias, Spain
- Occupations: Actor; Model; Humanitarian; Orange Foundation Ambassador
- Years active: 2007–present
- Website: JorgeAnegon.com

Jorge Anegon (born in the Principado de Asturias, Spain) is a Spanish actor who has worked in theater and television. At 19, he moved to Madrid to train as an actor, studying in the schools Juan Carlos Corazza and the Theater Laboratory William Layton, where he was taught by Fernando Legs, Concha Doñaque and Marta Fernández Muro. In his last TV appearance, he was part of the cast for the TV series Los nuestros, for Telecinco.

== Biography ==
Jorge Anegón is an actor born in Spain, in the province of Asturias (Mieres). From an early age, he communicated to his parents his desire to become an actor, but his parents wanted him to study something with "more future security". After completing his studies in Asturias, Anegón moved to Madrid to study interpretation. The first school he attended was William Layton Laboratory Theatre, followed by Central Theater, Toledo Gate Cultural Center, Teatro Destination or school Juan Carlos Corazza. Jorge studied with Concha Doñate, a reference throughout Spain. Teachers such as Fernando Legs, Marta Fernández Muro, Azucena de la Fuente or Rosa Estévez were also his instructors.

He combines his studies with working as a model for several agencies such as ChicModels and Isabel Navarro, walking in fashion shows for designer Valentino or working in several campaigns for Loewe.

He started his acting career with a role in the television series "Amar en Tiempos Revueltos" in 2007.

Anegón currently collaborates with various foundations, such as the Orange Foundation (belonging to the telecommunications company Orange), which works to help children with autism.

== Filmography ==
Movies

Año	Movie	Character	Filmmaker
2012	El último fin de semana	Tommy	Norberto Ramos De Val

TV

Year	TV Serie	Character	Channel
2014	Los nuestros	Brigada Martin	TeleCinco
2012	El don de Alba	Policia	TeleCinco
2009	La Familia Mata	Sergio	Antena 3
2008	Herederos	Luis	TVE
2007	Amar en tiempos revueltos	Episodicos	TVE

Voice Actor

Year	Business	Channel	Features
2014	TVE	España	Speech at the Paralympic TV program about the Paralympics
2012, 2013	Orange España	España	Speech to commercial for the company communication Orange España

VideoClip

Year	Song	Singer	Protagonist
2013	La Brújula	Huecco	Vanesa Romero y Jorge Anegon

Movies (short)

Año	Titulo	Director	Reparto
2012	Desde las nubes	José Carlos Gómez Delgado	Alba Messa, Jorge Anegon y Sergio de Blas
2011	La orden Voshlak	Marta Tovar Torres	Joan Llaneras, Jorge Anegon y Natalia Rodríguez Arroyo
2011	Lazos de sangre	Antonio Lozano	Jorge Anegon

== Press ==
- Periodico HOY
- ViviExtremadura
- Revista HOLA
