= This Too Shall Pass (film) =

- Film poster
- Spanish: También esto pasará
- Directed by: Maria Ripoll
- Screenplay by: Lea Garbini; Olga Iglesias; Maria Ripoll
- Based on: También esto pasará by Milena Busquets
- Produced by: Juan Gordon; Eva Cebrián
- Starring: Marina Salas; Susi Sánchez; Carlos Cuevas; Sara Espígul; Andrea Trepat; David Menéndez; Borja Espinosa; Carles Francino; Fermí Reixac
- Cinematography: Joan Bordera
- Edited by: Mariona Solé
- Music by: María Rodés
- Production companies: Morena Films; Evafilms Producciones; La Gauche Divine AIE; Peculiar Films; Rosamont
- Distributed by: A Contracorriente Films
- Release dates: 15 March 2025 (Málaga); 9 May 2025 (Spain)
- Countries: Spain; Italy
- Languages: Spanish; Catalan

This Too Shall Pass (Spanish: También esto pasará) is a 2025 drama film directed by Maria Ripoll based on novel by Milena Busquets. It stars Marina Salas. It is a Spanish-Italian co-production.

== Plot ==
Blanca follows a wanton lifestyle. After the death of her mother, she returns to her childhood home in Cadaqués to deal with grief.

== Cast ==
- Marina Salas as Blanca
- Susi Sánchez as Elena
- Carlos Cuevas as Santi
- Sara Espígul as Sofía
- Andrea Trepat as Elisa
- David Menéndez as Guillem
- Borja Espinosa as Martí
- Carles Francino as Óscar
- Fermí Reixach as Jorge

== Production ==
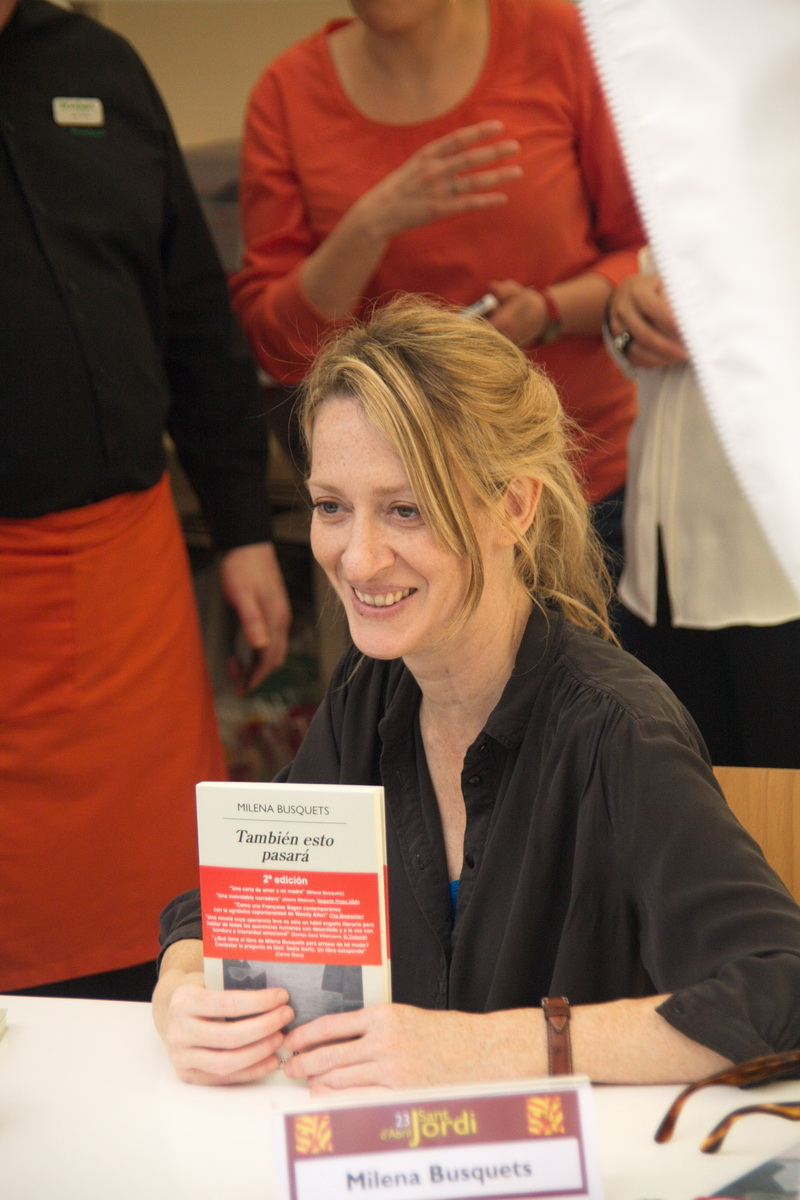
The film is based on Milena Busquets' También esto pasará

The film is based on the novel También esto pasará (2015) by Milena Busquets, dealing with the author's own experience around the death of her mother Esther Tusquets.

It is a Spanish-Italian co-production of Morena Films, Evafilms, La Gauche Divine AIE alongside Rosamont with the participation of RTVE, 3Cat and Amazon Prime Video. Shooting locations in Catalonia included Cadaqués and Barcelona.

== Release ==
This Too Shall Pass screened in a non-competitive slot of the 28th Málaga Film Festival on 15 March 2025.

Distributed by A Contracorriente Films, it is scheduled to be released theatrically in Spain on 9 May 2025.

== Reception ==
Andrea G. Bermejo of Cinemanía brought attention to performance of Salas, writing that she "brings a depth and precious truth to her character".

Javier Ocaña lamented the result to be "a self-satisfied trifle, generally elegant and occasionally mordant, but vacuous at the end of the day" and compared it unfavourably to the "formidable" book by Busquets.

Laura Pérez of Fotogramas rated the film 3 out of 5 stars, singling out Salas' performance as the best thing about the film.

== See also ==
- List of Spanish films of 2025
