= Broken Horses =

2014 film by Vidhu Vinod Chopra

- Theatrical release poster
- Directed by: Vidhu Vinod Chopra
- Written by: Vidhu Vinod Chopra; Abhijat Joshi
- Based on: Parinda (Hindi)(1989) by Vidhu Vinod Chopra
- Produced by: Vidhu Vinod Chopra
- Starring: Vincent D'Onofrio; Anton Yelchin; Chris Marquette; María Valverde; Thomas Jane
- Cinematography: Tom Stern
- Edited by: Todd E. Miller
- Music by: John Debney
- Production companies: Reliance Entertainment; Vinod Chopra Films
- Distributed by: Reliance Entertainment (United States); Fox Star Studios (India)
- Release date: April 10, 2015
- Running time: 101 minutes
- Countries: United States; India
- Language: English

Broken Horses is a 2015 crime thriller film directed by Vidhu Vinod Chopra and starring Anton Yelchin, Chris Marquette, Vincent D'Onofrio, María Valverde, Thomas Jane, and Sean Patrick Flanery. It was released on April 10, 2015. It is a remake of the 1989 Indian film Parinda, also directed by Chopra.

== Plot ==
Firmly in the tradition of American Westerns, it follows the lives of the two orphaned brothers. The older one, Buddy, sees his father being shot. Vulnerable and described as "slow", Buddy gets co-opted by gangster Julius Hench and turns into his key assassin. While Buddy grows up in a lawless environment, younger brother Jacob is a violinist auditioning for the New York Philharmonic, and on the verge of marrying his Italian girlfriend, Vittoria. But first Jacob must return to his dusty home town near the U.S.–Mexican border to receive his wedding present from his older brother. Returning to that one-horse town opens up unhealed wounds and forces Jacob and Buddy to confront some ugly truths.

Hench will not let Buddy quit the job. He will do anything to keep his most efficient, easily manipulated killing machine on his rolls, including bumping off Jacob. When Jacob realizes what Buddy is up against, he orchestrates a rather poorly designed plan to help them both escape from Hench.

== Cast ==
- Vincent D'Onofrio as Julius Hench
- Anton Yelchin as Jacob Heckum
  - Nicholas Neve as Young Jacob Heckum
- Chris Marquette as Buddy Heckum
  - Henry Shotwell as Young Buddy Heckum
- María Valverde as Vittoria
- Thomas Jane as Gabriel Heckum
- Sean Patrick Flanery as Ignacio
- Wes Chatham as "Ace"
- Greg Serano as Miguel Santion
- Sadie Alexandru as Santion's Wife
- Jeremy Luke as Franco
- Juan Riedinger as Eric
- Jordi Caballero as Mario Vargos Garza
- Johnathon Schaech as Agent McBradden

== Production ==
Principal photography began on October 29, 2012, in and around Los Angeles.

The teaser trailer for the film was released on December 19, 2014. Reliance Entertainment presented the film together with Vinod Chopra Films.

== Reception ==
The film received mostly negative reviews from critics. On the review aggregator website Rotten Tomatoes, 26% of 23 critics' reviews are positive. Metacritic, which uses a weighted average, assigned the film a score of 32 out of 100, based on 9 critics, indicating "generally unfavorable" reviews.

Writing for Variety, Ben Kenigsberg gave a mixed review and said, "This overwrought tale of two orphaned brothers and their violent hometown reunion fails to convince on several crucial levels, including plotting and dialogue. Despite name cast members and ace work from a Clint Eastwood regular [director of photography] Tom Stern, the audience for this curio exists mainly in the Twilight Zone, which is where the movie often seems to be set."
