= Neox Fan Awards =

Spanish entertainment awards

- Awarded for: Fan favourites in cinema, television, music and sports
- Country: Spain
- Presented by: Atresmedia
- First award: 2012
- Final award: 2015
- Website: http://www.antena3.com/neox-fan-awards/

The Neox Fan Awards were presented annually between 2012 and 2015 by Spanish media group Atresmedia in association with The Coca-Cola Company, with Fanta being the main sponsor of the awards. The aim was to create awards dedicated to the teenage audience in a similar style to that of the MTV Video Music Awards or Fox's Teen Choice Awards. The show was aired on Atresmedia's teen-oriented channel Neox.

== Categories ==
The Neox Fan Awards feature six kinds of categories:

- Movies
  - Best Spanish film of the year (2012-2015)
  - Best Spanish film actor of the year (2012-2015)
  - Best Spanish film actress of the year (2012-2015)
- Music
  - Best Spanish song of the year (2012-2013)
  - Best song of the year (2014-2015)
  - Best Spanish solo act (2012-2013)
  - Best singer of the year (2014-2015)
  - Best Spanish group (2012-2013)
  - Best group of the year (2014-2015)
  - Best flirting song (2012-2013)
  - Best new act of the year (2014-2015)
  - This Is My Song (2014-2015)
- Television (The nominations for these categories are often centered on shows aired on Atresmedia stations)
  - Best television programme (2012-2015)
  - Best television show host (2012-2015)
  - Best television series (2012-2015)
  - Best television series actor (2012-2015)
  - Best television series actress (2012-2015)
  - Best Game of Thrones character (2014)
- Sports
  - Pro of the year (2012)
- Neox categories
  - Best kiss of the year (2012-2015)
  - Best Neox character/Star of the year (2012-2015)
  - Best body of the year (2012-2015)
  - Most attractive couple (2013)
  - Best tweet (2012)
  - Best Neox Kidz series (2013)
  - Best selfie (2014-2015)
- Fanta categories
  - "A tomar Fanta" moment of the year (2012)
  - Best laugh (2012)
  - Idea of the year (2012)

== Voting system ==
On every category, the winner is decided via an Internet poll on the awards' official website. Several weeks before the award ceremony, ten nominees for each category are announced. Fans can cast one vote a day on each category by giving the nominees 1 to 10 points. Each week, the nominee who has the fewest points is eliminated from contention until only five candidates remain. The finalist who makes it to the end of the voting period with the most points is the winner.

== History ==
Year	Date	Venue	Hosted by
2012	October 23	Teatro La Latina, Madrid	Arturo Valls and Patricia Conde
2013	September 24	Palacio Municipal de Congresos, Madrid	Arturo Valls and Anna Simon
2014	October 8	Teatro Compac, Madrid	Cristina Pedroche and Anna Simon
2015	October 28	Palacio Municipal de Congresos, Madrid	Anna Simon and Miki Nadal
