= Zeltia Montes =

Spanish composer

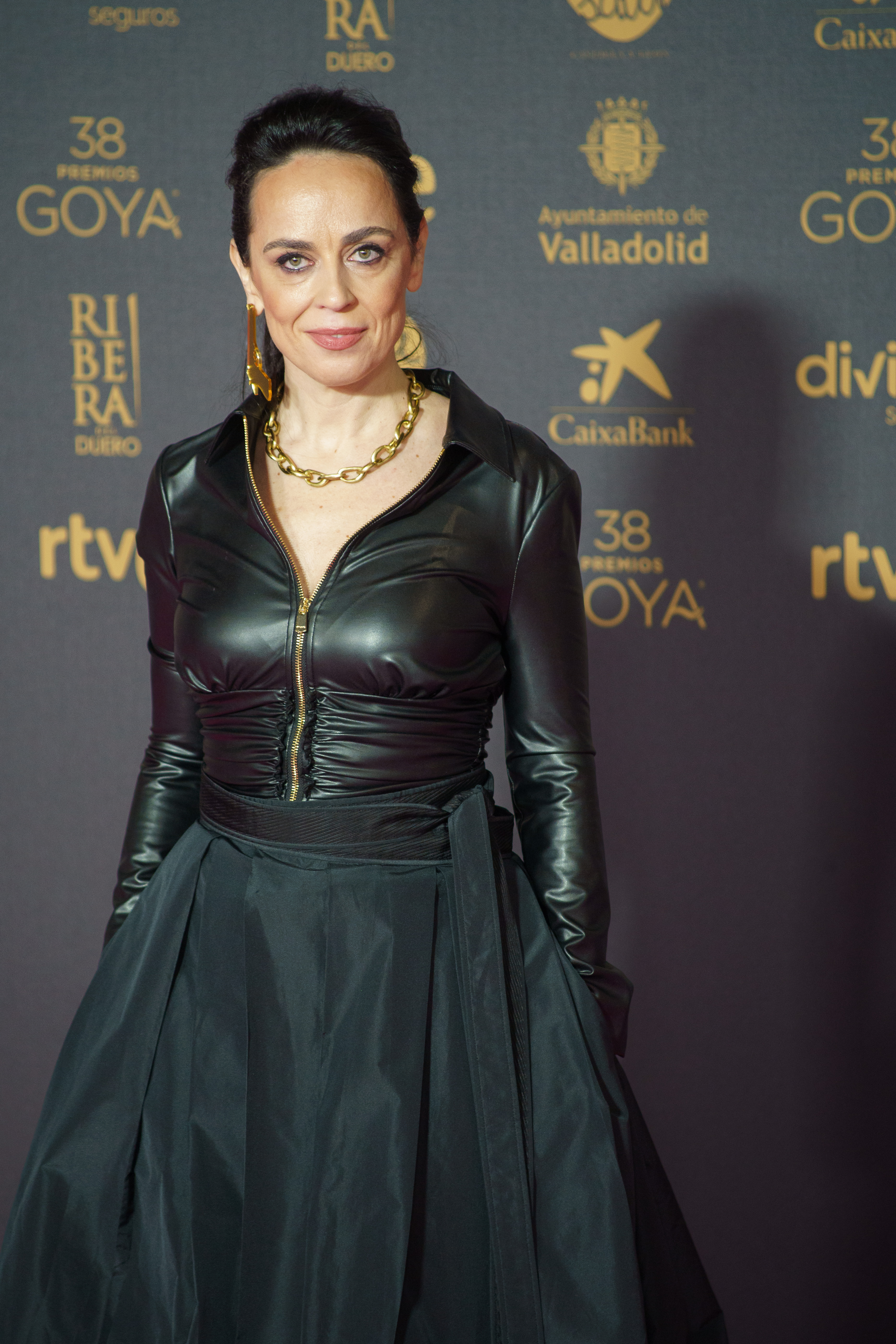
Montes in 2024

Zeltia Montes Muñoz (born 1979) is a Spanish composer. She won the Goya Award for Best Original Score for her work in The Good Boss.

== Life and career ==
Zeltia Montes Muñoz was born in 1979 in Madrid; her mother is from Madrid and her father from O Saviñao, Galicia. She studied at the Berklee College of Music in Boston.

In 2008, she collaborated in the documentary television series El camino del Cid (2008). She made her debut in a film score in Pradolongo, winning a Mestre Mateo Award. She won the Goya Award for Best Original Score for The Good Boss (2021).

== Filmography ==
- Pradolongo (2008)
- Vilamor (2012)
- Traces of Sandalwood (2014)
- A esmorga (2014)
- The Silence of the Marsh (2020)
- Bye (2019)
- One for All (2020)
- The Good Boss (2021)
- Voy a pasármelo bien (2022)
- The House Among the Cactuses (2022)
- Bird Box Barcelona (2023)
- My Loneliness Has Wings (2023)
- The Wait (2023)
- Something Is About to Happen (2023)
- Nina (2024)
- Salve Maria (2024)
