= Fernando González Molina =

Spanish film director

- González Molina in 2026
- Born: Fernando González Molina; 11 November 1975 (age 50); Pamplona, Spain
- Education: University of Navarre; ECAM
- Occupations: Film director; television director

Fernando González Molina (born 10 November 1975) is a Spanish film and television director.

== Biography ==
Fernando González Molina was born in Pamplona, Navarre, on 10 November 1975. He studied audiovisual communication at the University of Navarra and Direction at the ECAM. He began his audiovisual career with the short film Velocidad, starring Beatriz Carvajal, Laura Morales and Vicente Granadas. He won the Golden Roel award at the Medina del Campo Festival, the Audience Award at the Astorga Festival, and the Blockbuster award for the best short film of the year. After this short, he began working for the Globomedia production company such as creating previews of the Águila Roja and Los Serrano series, as well as documentaries about the UPA Dance tours. He also made the video clips of Fran Perea and Pablo Puyol, as well as documentaries about El Sueño de Morfeo tours.

Since 2008, he has directed some episodes of the Antena 3 television series Los hombres de Paco, where he met his assistant, Mario Casas. In 2009 he released his first feature film, Fuga de cerebros, a comedy in which a boy manufactures fake grants to be with the girl he likes, who is at Oxford University. The film became a box office success, grossing €6,863,216 and attracting 1,176,069 viewers, in addition to winning the Audience Award at the Málaga Film Festival.

In May 2010, filming began on Tres metros sobre el cielo, based on the 1992 novel of the same name by Federico Moccia. The film became the highest grossing Spanish film in the country, surpassing one million viewers.

On January 17,2011, began the broadcast on Antena 3 of his second television series, El barco, on which he served as director together with David Molina Encinas, Sandra Gallego and Jesús Colmenar.

On June 13, 2011, he began filming Fuga de cerebros: Ahora en Harvard as an executive producer, which tells the story of the younger brother of the protagonist of the previous film, who followed the girl he likes to Harvard University. It premiered on December 2, 2011.

In September 2011, he started shooting Tengo ganas de ti, based on Moccia's book. The movie, in which the protagonists were played by Mario Casas and Clara Lago, was released in June 2012. In its first weekend after being released it became the tenth highest-grossing film in the world.

In April 2012, he began to broadcast the television series Luna, el misterio de Calenda on Antena 3, in which González Molina served as director along with Laura Belloso, David Bermejo, Jesús Rodrigo, José Ramón Ayerra, Alexandra Graf, Antonio Díaz Huerta and Begoña Álvarez Rojas. The series ran for two seasons and did not continue due to poor viewing statistics.

In 2014, the series directed by Fernando together with David Molina Encinas, Bienvenidos al Lolita, was released. The movie exposes the differences between two classes of society.

Later in 2014, he started filming the movie Palm Trees in the Snow, inspired by Luz Gabás's novel, in which tells the story of a forbidden love between different cultures and the knowledge of its secrets half a century later. The film was released in December 2015 and was awarded a Best Original Song and Best Art Direction award at the 30th Goya Awards.

In 2017, the director premiered a movie, The Invisible Guardian, based on the first novel of the Báztan Trilogy by Dolores Redondo, in which he tries to solve the mysteries of the murder of a teenage girl in his area. The film garnered nearly three million viewers in its third weekend since it hit the big screen.

On April 25, 2018, he directed the first season of the series La otra mirada, which was produced by Boomerang TV, and premiered on Televisión Española, which has broadcast five chapters to date. This series is set in the 1920s and deals with the nature of feminism of the time.

Also in 2018, Fernando released his documentary, The best day of my life, in theaters, which visualizes the story of six people from different countries, all of whom are members of LGBT, around the celebration of the WorldPride 2017 party in Madrid.

== Filmography ==
=== Film ===
Year	Title	Capacity
2009	Fuga de cerebros (Brain Drain)	Director
2010	Tres metros sobre el cielo (Three Steps Above Heaven)	Director
2011	Fuga de cerebros 2	Executive Producer
2012	Tengo ganas de ti (I Want You)	Director
2015	Palmeras en la nieve (Palm Trees in the Snow)	Director
2017	El guardián invisible (The Invisible Guardian)	Director
2019	Legado en los huesos (The Legacy of the Bones)	Director
2020	Ofrenda a la tormenta (Offering to the Storm)	Director

=== Television ===
Year	Title	Capacity
2009	Los hombres de Paco	Director
2011	El Barco	Director
2013	Luna, el misterio de Calenda	Director
2014	Bienvenidos al Lolita	Director
2018	La otra mirada	Director
2021	Paraíso	Director and creator

=== Documentaries ===
Year	Title	Capacity
2018	The Best Day of My Life	Director and screenwriter

== Awards ==
Award	Festival	Movie
Best Spanish Film Award	Fotograma de Plata	Palmeras en la nieve
Biznaga de Plata Premio del público	Málaga Film Festival	Fuga de Cerebros
Roel de Oro	Festival of Medina del Campo	Velocidad (short film)
Audience award	Festival of Astorga	Velocidad (short film)
