= The Skin of the Wolf =

2017 film directed by Samu Fuentes

- Spanish: Bajo la piel de lobo
- Directed by: Samu Fuentes
- Written by: Samu Fuentes
- Starring: Mario Casas; Irene Escolar; Ruth Díaz
- Production companies: Nasa Producciones; Orreaga Filmak
- Distributed by: Alfa Pictures
- Release dates: 3 November 2017 (SEFF); 9 March 2018 (Spain)
- Running time: 1h 50min
- Country: Spain
- Language: Spanish

The Skin of the Wolf (Spanish: Bajo la piel de lobo) is a 2017 Spanish drama film directed by Samu Fuentes. It stars Mario Casas, Irene Escolar and Ruth Díaz. The film was theatrically released in Spain on 9 March 2018.

== Plot ==
Martinon is a huntsman who lives a life of solitude on a mountain top in an abandoned town. The area near Martinon's home is rocky with steep hills, which are surrounded by a dense forest filled with wildlife. Martinon's daily routine consists of maintaining the land in front of his house, setting traps, tending to his goats and hunting for wolves so that he can trade their skins. Martinon's physical appearance, tall and muscular with shaggy hair and a bushy beard, intimidates those he encounters.

During a visit to the local town, Martinon is collecting a bounty from wolf skin from the mayor. The mayor haggles with him over the price. The bar owner Severino suggests to Martinon that he should consider marriage and starting a family to pass on his property as his legacy. Martinon considers the suggestion but points out that the conditions of his life in the mountains are no place for children or a wife. On his way out of town Martinon has sex with a local woman, Pascuala. Martinon makes a deal with Pascuala's father, Ubaldo, and pays the father a sum of money for Pascuala.

Martinon leaves town with Pascuala as his wife. Pascuala adapts to her new home life with ease, but begins showing signs of an unknown illness through consistent coughing. Pascuala also tells Martinon that she is pregnant. Martinon shows no verbal or facial expressions on how he feels about the pregnancy, but begins to create a baby crib. Pascuala's illness worsens, resulting with a difficult pregnancy. Bedridden Pasculua dies while giving birth to a stillborn baby boy, while Martinon is tending to the goats.

Visibly saddened and frustrated because of the deaths of his wife and son, Martinon breaks the baby crib he created. While attempting to bury their bodies, Martinon burst into a fit of anger and begins knocking down the headstones on the older surrounding graves of the graveyard. Martinon brings the bodies of his wife and the baby boy to Ubaldo, and accuses him of knowing that Pasculua was sick and pregnant with someone else's child upon joining him. Ubaldo concedes to the accusations, stating that he was afraid that Pascuala's reputation would be ruined. He'd hoped that once Pascuala had her baby, people would believe that Martinon was the father, since they were living together. Martinon berates Ubaldo for not being a good father and demands his money back. Ulbaldo begs Martinon for time to collect the money. Martinon gives him until the next spring to pay.

When Martinon goes back to Ubaldo to collect his money, rifle in hand, Ubaldo instead of money offers his youngest daughter, Adela, to Martinon. He says Adela will join him, provided that he marry her. Martinon accepts Adela and the next day they are married. After the wedding, Ubaldo apologizes to Adela for the impromptu marriage. He pleads with Adela not to run away, but instead to attempt to adapt to the situation, because should she run away, Martinon would look for her and also come after Ubaldo. Her father then gives Adela a red cloth, later revealed to contain herbs, telling her to use it should her situation become unbearable.

Adela leaves with Martinon on the journey back to the top of the mountain. The walk is strenuous for Adela, causing Martinon to stop repeatedly to give her water. Adela does not adapt to her new life; Martinon is a brutal rapist who offers no human connection, regarding Adela as a piece of property. One day Martinon informs Adela that he will be gone for trading for four days. Martinon warns Adela to be careful of the wild life in the forest, should she venture outside the abandoned town. While alone for four days, Adela inspects the ruined buildings of the abandoned town and the nearby cemetery, where she notices two open graves. Upon Martinon's return, Adela asks for whom they were intended. Martinon replies that "they're not graves, just holes". This response upsets Adela and she begins to walk away when Martinon tells her that Pascuala's death was her father's fault because Ubaldo traded Pascuala knowing she was sick and pregnant. Martinon also tells Adela that Ubaldo did the same trade with her. Adela calls Martinon a liar and walks away.

Later Martinon observes Adela staring tearfully out into the distance. While looking at herself in the mirror Adela realizes she is pregnant. Though Martinon shows no verbal or facial reaction, he prepares a baby crib and makes breakfast for Adela in the mornings. Martinon also begins to reduce any strenuous activities for Adela. One day while cleaning a wolf skin, Adela becomes frustrated, and resolves to poison Martinon's food with herbs her Mother sends her. Martinon unknowingly eats the poisoned foods and soon becomes sick, vomiting daily. Adela appears pleased with herself and decides to run away while Martinon is out hunting. While running down the mountain Adela steps on one of the traps set by Martinon, preventing her from properly running and walking.

When Martinon returns home to find Adela gone he immediately searches the ruined buildings of the town. The next morning he follows Adela's tracks and discovers her passed out under some fallen trees. Martinon takes Adela home to nurse her back to health. While wrapping the unconscious Adela's frost bitten feet Martinon observes Adela having a miscarriage. Adela becomes strong enough to walk around the house. Adela sorrowfully tells Martinon that she lost the baby. Martinon is quiet, as he is already aware. Martinon tells Adela that once she fully recovers, she can return to her family. When Adela asks why, Martinon only replies that the days are shorter so she'll have to leave early. Adela shows a mix of happiness and remorsefulness while standing outside alone, and she eventually leaves.

Martinon is left alone in his home. He soon discovers Adela's hidden canister of poisonous herbs. Martinon stands outside silently crying to himself while staring out into the distance. The film ends with Martinon in bed looking up at the ceiling alone in his house while the darkness settles around him, with his rifle by his side. As the scene pulls away, the door to Martinon's house has been left wide open to a cold snowy evening.

== Cast ==
- Mario Casas as Martinón
- Irene Escolar as Adela
- Ruth Díaz as Pascuala
- Kandido Uranga as Severino
- Josean Bengoetxea as Marcial
- Armando Aguirre as Ubaldo (voice)
- Ainhoa Sánchez as Nora
- Patricia Cid as Marina
- Francisco Domínguez as Don Bernardo
- Alfonso Giménez as Ayudante Alcalde
- Laura Cuellar as Fátima
- Gustavo Sánchez as Herrero

== Production ==
The film is writer/director Samu Fuentes' debut feature.

== Reception ==
On review aggregator Rotten Tomatoes, the film holds an approval rating of 67% based on 9 reviews, with an average rating of 5.50/10.

== Release ==
The film had its world premiere at the 14th Seville European Film Festival on 3 November 2017. Distributed by Alfa Pictures, the film was theatrically released in Spain on 9 March 2018. The film was released on 6 July 2018 on Netflix.
