= ServiceHunter =

Swiss business services company

ServiceHunter AG is a ETH spin-off Swiss company. It is behind quitt, a platform specializing in automated services for the registration, insurance, and payroll accounting of private employees.

As of 2024, almost 30,000 private households with a total payroll of over CHF 400 million have handed over the administration of their employment relationships to quitt.

== History ==
ServiceHunter AG
- Company type: Private
- Industry: Automated services
- Founded: July 27, 2010
- Founder: David Christen; Daniel Moser
- Area served: Switzerland; Germany
- Services: quitt

ServiceHunter AG was founded by David Christen and Daniel Moser in Zurich on July 27, 2010. The company was built on the concept of focusing on the development of a platform for the posting and fulfillment of job requests with automated legalization of these employment relationships.

In 2011, ServiceHunter AG launched quitt, pivoting away from the platform to focus on automating the registration and accounting of social security contributions for private individuals.

In 2012, Luzius Meisser, Thomas Dübendorfer, Myke Näf, and Paul Sevinç, along with private investors, contributed to a financing round of 600,000 Swiss francs, and quitt was recognized among the Top 100 Startups in Switzerland.

In 2015, the company received the SEF.High-Potential KMU award. In 2016, the company achieved second place in the Swiss Economic Award on the Swiss Economic Forum.

In 2020, quitt expanded its coverage to all 26 cantons of Switzerland. In 2023, ServiceHunter AG received three Best of Swiss Apps awards for their newly launched product quitt Business for startups.

== Products and services ==
ServiceHunter AG has two main products: quitt for private employers and quitt Business for startups. Quitt operates in both Switzerland and Germany. However, quitt Business is only available in Switzerland. The company's services include the entire employment process, from contract creation to insurance and payroll accounting.
