= Three Steps Above Heaven =

- Theatrical release poster
- Spanish: Tres metros sobre el cielo
- Directed by: Fernando González Molina
- Screenplay by: Ramón Salazar
- Based on: Tre metri sopra il cielo by Federico Moccia
- Produced by: Mercedes Gamero; Daniel Écija; Francisco Ramos
- Starring: Mario Casas; María Valverde; Álvaro Cervantes; Marina Salas; Luis Fernández; Andrea Duro; Diego Martín; Pablo Rivero; Nerea Camacho
- Cinematography: Daniel Aranyó
- Edited by: Irene Blecua
- Music by: Manel Santisteban
- Production companies: Zeta Cinema; A3 Films; Cangrejo Films; Globomedia
- Distributed by: Warner Bros. Pictures
- Release date: 3 December 2010
- Running time: 118 minutes
- Country: Spain
- Language: Spanish
- Budget: $3,000,000
- Box office: €9,881,471

Three Steps Above Heaven (Spanish: Tres metros sobre el cielo; stylized as 3MSC) is a 2010 Spanish romantic drama film directed by Fernando González Molina which stars Mario Casas and María Valverde. Written by Ramón Salazar, it is a remake of the Italian film Three Steps Over Heaven, which is based on the 1992 novel of the same name by Federico Moccia.

== Plot ==
The story begins with Babi Alcázar being driven to school, while Hugo Olivera otherwise known as Ache/H, rides on his motorcycle. The latter teases Babi while waiting at the traffic lights.

The two are from completely different backgrounds. Babi is from an elite family consisting of her parents, Claudio and Rafaela, and her sister Daniela. She is very refrained, quiet and shy and is only known to go home, school and high class social gatherings with her friends. H on the other hand, is a reckless jobless youth, who spends his time causing trouble with his friends including Pollo, and street races at night, Siamese style (where the passenger rides pillion facing backwards, secured to the rider via a belt). He also has a refrained relationship with his family, especially with his mother since he caught her with another man.

One night, a party is hosted with Babi, her sister Daniela, her friend Katina, and Babis boyfriend. The Siamese gatecrash the party and cause trouble. With H throwing Babi into the house pool after she throws milkshake at him in an altercation. After the riot, while Babis boyfriend is driving Babi home, the bike gang appear behind and damage the car. He bumps off one of them, which causes H to chase and attack him, even elbowing a road user who is trying to break up the fight. When Babi grabs hold of H,Her boyfriend drives off without her, causing H to drop her off.

The next morning, Babi finds out that Katina is dating Pollo, much to her dismay as this means she will see H often. One night, Katina goes to the street race at the port and switches off her phone. She goes there and in a turn of events, she ends up as a Siamese for H's nemesis, El Chino. When the race is over, she goes to help a fellow racer who fell before the finish, but the police arrives and H helps her escape and drops her off. The next morning, it is revealed a police captured both H and Babi on the bike together and is out on the newspapers. One day, she bunks school to go on a date with H, who initially gets in an altercation with his mother and her boyfriend at a traffic jam. But she eventually calms him down.

However, the teacher at Babis school finds out about Babis ordeal and calls her parents, and lowers her grades thus dropping her chances of college. To cheer her up, H takes her on a surprise date to an empty house by the beach which she dreamt of owning when she was young. They have sex and return in the evening. H then blackmails Babis teacher to change her grade and holds her pet dog, Pepito, hostage.

Following H, Pollo and the whole gang bursting into her house during a private moment, she refrains from talking to him. From that point, H and Babi get into frequent arguments. On Katinas and Babis results day, they're both elated to have passed. Pollo decides to propose to Katina after their race that night, and wants H to be there. However, Babi, in an attempt to gift the teacher for the grade, finds Pepito and realizes H's actions, she chastises him and tells him to stay away for a while. H is heartbroken,and stays in bed, while Babi goes to her 18th birthday party, being driven by her neighbour, Padre. H arrives at the party and dances with Babi. Padre, jealous, spills wine on Babi, making it look like an accident and triggering a fight with H. But Babi comes to Padres defense and kicks H out.

Daniela then receives a call that Pollo and Katina crashed during the race, killing Pollo. H is overcome by guilt and anger. Babi, scared of the potential life that could come with dating him decides to break up with him. A couple of months go by and its Christmas, H is struggling to move on from the loss of Babi and Pollo. Katina comes to grieve her loss of Pollo with him. It is revealed that Babi lost touch with Katina following the accident. Stepping away from the street crowd and dating Padre. One night, when H goes to phone Babi, her mum picks up and hangs up the phone as she sees Babi and Padre off on their date, which H then witnesses.

H confides with his brother, Alex and accepts that whatever goes will never return. In order to help him come to terms, he decides to move to London for work. The film ends with H and Alex on the bike, riding away from the beach and on the road that H and Babi shared many memories on.

== Cast ==
- Mario Casas as H / Hugo Olivera
- María Valverde as Babi Alcázar
- Álvaro Cervantes as Pollo
- Marina Salas as Katina Herreruela
- Luis Fernández as El Chino
- Andrea Duro as Mara
- Nerea Camacho as Daniela
- Diego Martín as Alex / Alejandro Olivera
- Cristina Plazas as Rafaela Alcázar
- Jordi Bosch as Claudio Alcázar
- Joan Crosas as Padre H.
- Pablo Rivero as Gustavo

== Production ==
The film was produced by Cangrejo Films, Globomedia, Zeta Cinema, and Antena 3 Films.

== Release ==
The film was released theatrically in Spain on 3 December 2010.

== Sequels ==
The film spawned a 2012 sequel, I Want You.

== Accolades ==
Year	Award	Category	Nominee(s)	Result	Ref.
2011	25th Goya Awards	Best Adapted Screenplay	Ramón Salazar Hoogers	Nominated	

== See also ==
- List of Spanish films of 2010
