= I Want You (2012 film) =

- Theatrical release poster
- Spanish: Tengo ganas de ti
- Directed by: Fernando González Molina
- Screenplay by: Ramón Salazar
- Based on: Ho voglia di te by Federico Moccia
- Produced by: Francisco Ramos; Álex Pina; Mercedes Gamero; Daniel Écija
- Starring: Mario Casas; Clara Lago; María Valverde
- Cinematography: Daniel Aranyó
- Edited by: Irene Blecua; Verónica Callón
- Music by: Manel Santisteban
- Production companies: Zeta Cinema; Antena 3 Films; Charanga Films; Globomedia
- Distributed by: Warner Bros. Pictures
- Release date: 22 June 2012
- Running time: 130 minutes
- Country: Spain
- Language: Spanish
- Box office: $24 million

I Want You (Spanish: Tengo ganas de ti) is a 2012 Spanish drama film directed by Fernando González Molina, starring Mario Casas, the sequel to Tres metros sobre el cielo (Three Metres Above Heaven). It is a remake of the Italian film Ho voglia di te, which is based on the novel by Federico Moccia.

It was produced by Zeta Cinema, Antena 3 Films, Crab Films and Globomedia film and distributed by Warner Bros. Pictures. It was shot in Barcelona between October 28 and December 30, 2011.

== Plot ==
H (Mario Casas) flies back to Barcelona after spending two years in London, trying to forget his first love, Babi (María Valverde), and the death of his best friend, Pollo (Álvaro Cervantes). His brother picks him up from the airport; after he settles himself in, he sees his bike covered with a sheet. H takes his bike for a spin and lands in the port where he used to race illegally. As soon as he gets there he receives a call, turns out Katina (Marina Salas) found out through Álex (H's brother) that he just got back; they both agree to meet at a park. When he arrives at the park, ache sees Chino (Lucho Fernandez) who tells him that things have changed. Chino invites him to a get-together in a restaurant with their other friends. While waiting sitting on a bench, Katina surprises him and they both sit down for some catch-up time. Katina asks H if he has missed Babi and tells him that she's seen her, but that she has changed. H invites her to the get-together, but Katina declines the invitation and they part ways promising to keep in touch. H gets on his motorcycle and is seen being followed by Gin (Clara Lago).

Gin follows H to a gas station and when he goes into the store, she accidentally hits his bike. He picks it up and asks her what has he done to her. While giggling, she explains to him that the motorcycle was in front and accidentally fell. She begs him to give her the keys back and threatens to call the police, he turns around and tells her to call the police to see if her situation will get better. He walks to her car and locks all the doors so she can't get in. On their way, she asks him his name and he tells her "Hache" which is the letter "H" in Spanish. She giggles and questions him what his real name is behind the letter, by mentioning a few. He answers with Hugo, which she thinks is an appealing name. On the other hand, when she is asked about hers she says that is Gin derived from Ginebra, to which he laughs and mocks her once more.

Days later Katina and H go to a club where Daniela (Nerea Camacho), Babi's sister, is, drugged while having sex. Katina finds her half-naked in a bathroom stall. The next morning, Babi wakes up Daniela before her mom sees her and asks her what is wrong with her after she had received a text at 5:00 AM to go and pick her up, that she got home alone in a taxi almost unconsciously, and that she won't cover up for her anymore. Daniela is seen remembering that, along her taxi, H was riding his motorcycle. Daniela tells her that H is back and that he rode his bike along the taxi that she was in and that he had been the one to send Babi the text. That night H picks Gin up for a date, while Babi is seen caressing the tattoo that she got which is H's initial. H takes Gin to a place very high in the city and they both end up having sex.

They go out to eat with Luque (Ferrán Vilajosana) and Katina, while this last one receives a call H notices Serpiente (Antonio Velázquez) with Pollo's bike. H furiously goes towards Serpiente and asks him why he has Pollo's motorcycle. Serpiente defies, inferring that for H to get back the motorcycle he has to race him. A brawl breaks out but is immediately stopped by Gin and company.

On the night of the premiere of the television show, Gin is ready to perform when H tells her that there is something that he must do first. While she sings, H goes to a party where he reunites with Babi. She takes him to the house she always dreamed was hers (and where they had sex the first time). The former couple ends up having sex in the sand. Meanwhile, Gin finishes her performance and goes on to look for H. While walking she hears a woman and a man having sex, she opened the door and notices that it wasn't H. She shyly and quietly closes the door and keeps walking. Hearing laughter from another door, she knocks and one of the top bosses of the TV show is revealed to be inside. They let her in and tell her that H is with them. When she doesn't see him, she tells them that she will go. They don't let her and try to rape her. H ends things with Babi "for the better" and goes to look for Gin. When he gets to the after-party of the premiere, the other dancers tell him that they saw her walk through the corridors of the dressing rooms. When he gets there, he hears screams and he sees that Gin is about to be raped. He starts punching the men and yells at Gin to leave. When he's done, he goes to look for Gin and sees her walking away. Gin asks H where he's been. Though he remains silent, she deduces what happened and walks away, breaking ties with him. H, in a state of immense pain, races off on his motorcycle and Katina tries to stop him. H arrives at the race to face off against Serpiente for Pollo's motorcycle. At the end of the race, each rider exchanges motorcycles. H finds closure in Pollo's death, and with one final hallucination of him, rides the motorcycle into the water. Weeks pass, Gin has a photography exhibition and all the pictures revolve around H. Babi's mother tells their father it's over due to his infidelity. Daniela, Babi, and their mother go to Daniela's first doctor's appointment. In another scene, Katina is seen happy with Luque. H is shown at the exhibition and realizes that Gin has known him before and that she has been taking pictures of him for a long time. H goes to see her and she tells him he can help her 'fix this disaster', and if they work at it that maybe they'll turn out fine. H and Gin become a happy couple once again.

== Cast ==
- Mario Casas as Hugo ("H")
- Clara Lago as Ginebra "Gin"
- María Valverde as Babi
- Marina Salas as Katina
- Álvaro Cervantes as Pollo
- Diego Martín as Álex
- Antonio Velázquez as Serpiente
- Nerea Camacho as Daniela
- Carme Elías as H's mother
- Cristina Plazas as Rafaela
- Jordi Bosch as Claudio
- Lucho Fernández as Chino
- Joan Crosas as H's father
- Ferrán Vilajosana as Luque

== Release ==
The film was released in theaters on 22 June 2012.

On its opening day, it grossed 1,628,000 €, 72% of the proceeds of that day, and became the best premiere of the year so far. In its first weekend stood in front of the Spanish box office with €3,197,446 and 487,515 spectators. By the eight week in theatres it had raised a total of €12,100,892 and was watched by 1,939,145 viewers.

Globally it stood at the tenth position of the highest-grossing films worldwide in its first weekend of release in 2012, with $3,813,618. In Russia, it was the second most popular film, behind the remake, The Amazing Spider-man.

== See also ==
- List of Spanish films of 2012
