= Mario Casas =

Spanish film and television actor

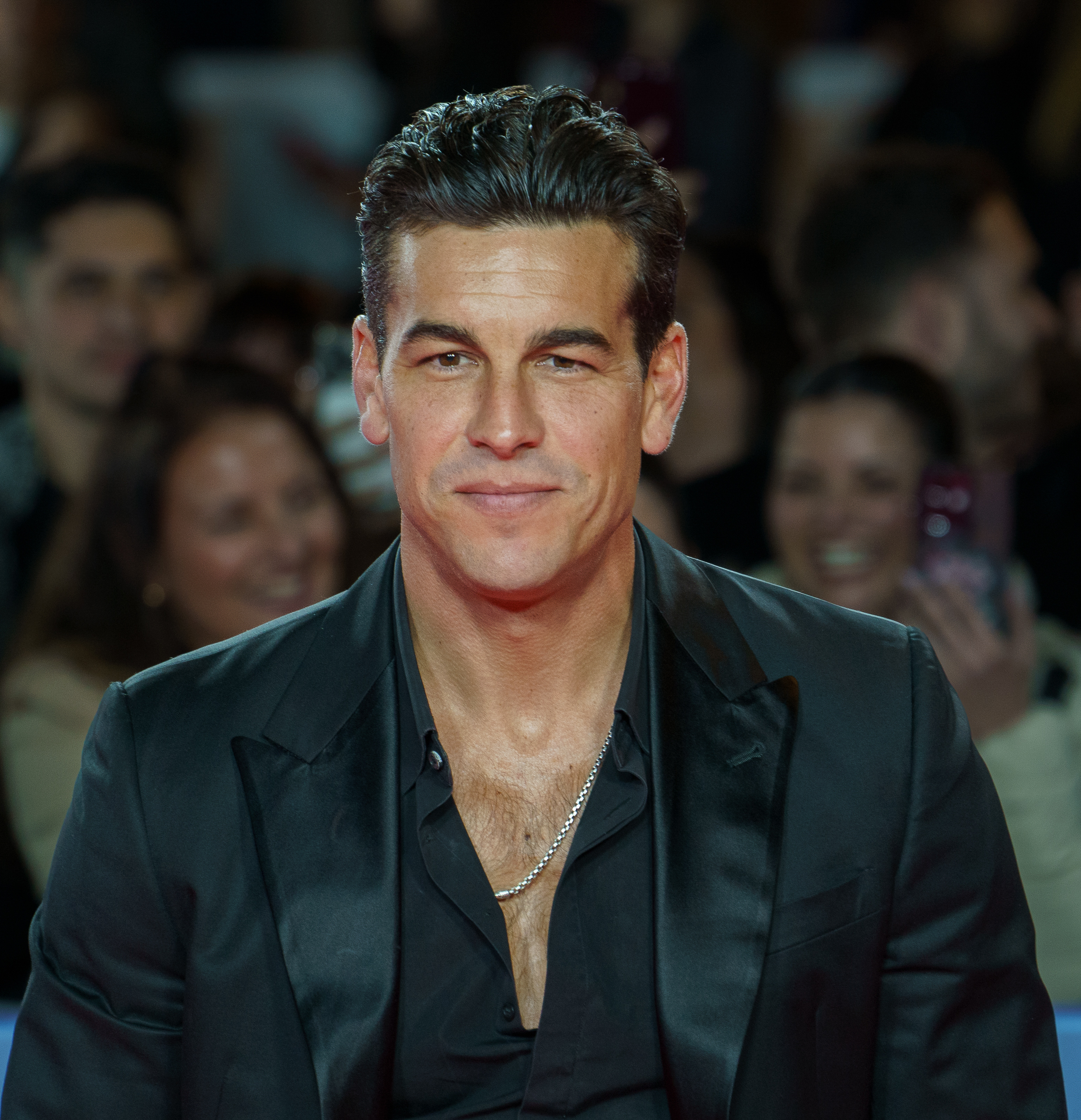
- Casas in 2025
- Born: Mario Casas Sierra; 12 June 1986 (age 40); A Coruña, Galicia, Spain
- Occupation: Actor
- Years active: 2005–present
- Relatives: Óscar Casas (brother)

Mario Casas Sierra (born 12 June 1986) is a Spanish film and television actor. Known for his roles in Spanish cinema and television, he has received various accolades including a Goya Award, two Gaudí Awards, and three Feroz Awards.

In 2006, after featuring in minor credits in Motivos personales and Obsesión, Casas landed his first television main role in the teen drama SMS: Sin Miedo a Soñar and also debuted in the big screen in Summer Rain. Casas acquired a larger clout owing to his appearance in the television series Los hombres de Paco, as part of a popular love triangle together with Hugo Silva and Michelle Jenner. His early film career, featuring in box-office darlings such as Sex, Party and Lies (2009), Brain Drain (2009), and Three Steps Above Heaven (2010), consolidated after his performance as bad boy Hache in the latter title, which earned him wide popularity in Spain. He also starred in television series El barco (2011−13).

He went on to feature in starring roles in films such as Unit 7 (2012), I Want You (2012; the sequel to Three Steps Above Heaven), The Mule (2013), Witching & Bitching (2013), Ismael (2013), My Big Night (2015), Palm Trees in the Snow (2015), Toro (2016), The Invisible Guest (2016), The Bar (2017), The Skin of the Wolf (2017), The Photographer of Mauthausen (2018), Bye (2019), The Occupant (2020), and The Paramedic (2020).

He also appeared in English-language international projects Eden and The 33.

Casas' leading performance in Cross the Line (2020) earned him his first Goya Award for Best Actor. He made his debut as a director with Caged Wings (2023). He received renewed industry recognition for his leading role in Away (2025).

== Early life and education ==
Casas was born in A Coruña to a 19-year-old father (an ébéniste) and a 17-year-old mother. He moved to Barcelona at the age of 4. After featuring as a child actor in some commercials (Cola Cao, Scalextric, Telepizza), he moved to Madrid at age 17−18 with his family, going on to combine odd jobs with acting training at the Cristina Rota acting school.

== Acting career ==
=== 2005–2010: Early work and breakthrough ===
Casas began appearing in soap operas from 2005 at age 19, before earning minor roles in several Spanish films. Mario Casas began his acting career with episode appearances in television series Obsesión (English: Obsession), Motivos personales (Personal Motives) and Mujeres (Women). He came to domestic media attention with his film debut in the 2006 film El camino de los ingleses (Summer Rain), directed by Antonio Banderas.

That same year he joined the cast of LaSexta series SMS. Casas then reached international audience as Aitor Carrasco in the Antena 3 series Los hombres de Paco (Paco's Men), which he starred from 2007 to 2010.

In 2009, Casas appeared in two hit films, Fuga de cerebros (Brain Drain) opposite Amaia Salamanca, and Mentiras y Gordas (Sex, Party and Lies) with his best friend Yon González, Ana Maria Polvorosa, Ana de Armas and Hugo Silva. Both managed to lead the box office over the weekend of its release. In 2010, Casas starred in Carne de neón (Neon Flesh) directed by Paco Cabezas. Later that year in December 2010, he starred in Tres metros sobre el cielo (Three Steps Above Heaven) opposite María Valverde. It was eventually the highest-grossing Spanish film of the year. A sequel Tengo ganas de ti (I Want You), which stars Casas, Valverde and Clara Lago, premiered in 2012. He also appeared in Miedo (2010), directed by Jaume Balagueró.

=== 2011–present: Career expansion and further acclaim ===
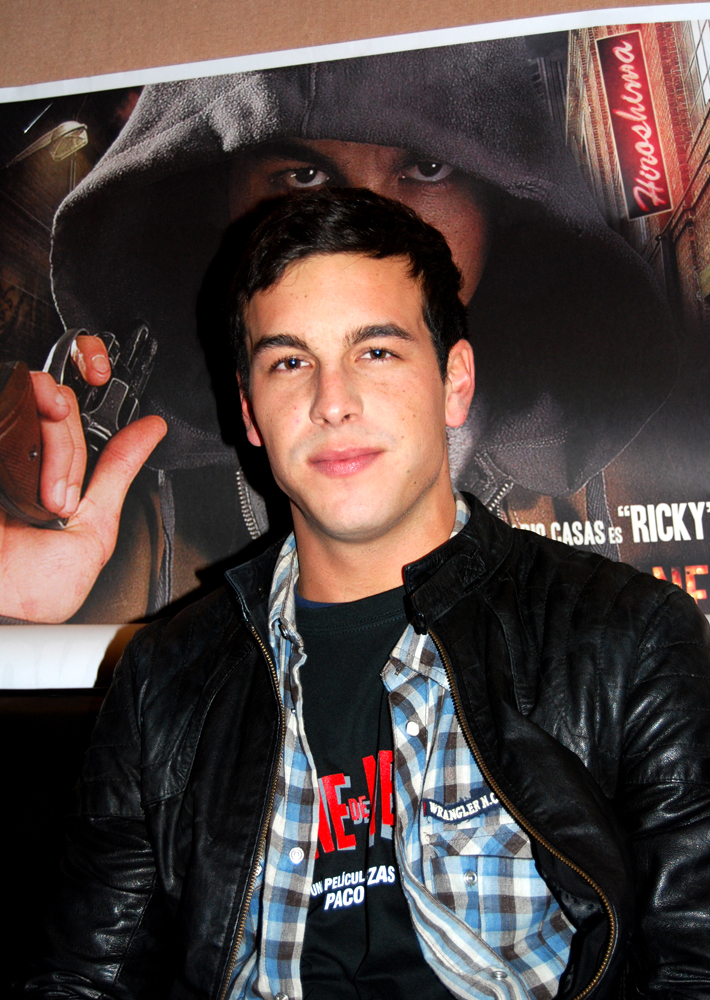
Casas in January 2011, during the presentation of Carne de neón

Since 2011, Casas has starred the Antena 3 series El barco (The Boat), he also starred in Tengo ganas de ti (I Want You), premiered in 2012.

During the late 2013 and early 2014, he went to Colombia and Chile for his second film project in English called Los 33 (The 33) with Antonio Banderas and Juliette Binoche, a story based on the Chilean mining accident that occurred in 2010. In 2015, Mario also starred in two other films: the new Álex de la Iglesia comedy film My Great Night, and also in the romantic drama film Palm Trees in the Snow, where he reunited with the director of the films Three Meters Above The Sky and I Want You, Fernando Gonzalez Molina. In 2016, he performed in Oriol Paulo's mystery thriller film The Invisible Guest which became a commercial success, although the film had opened to mixed critical responses. The film grossed US$3.9 million in Spain and CN¥172.4 million in China. In 2018, Casas starred in The Photographer of Mauthausen which tells the story of Francisco Boix, a Spanish Republican photographer who was sent to the Mauthausen-Gusen concentration camp complex during World War II. Casas lost around 12 kilograms (26 pounds) to play Boix during his imprisonment.

In October 2022, Casas began to shoot his debut as a feature film director, My Loneliness Has Wings, written alongside Deborah François and starring his brother Óscar.

For his leading role playing a foreign man getting on in life in Utrecht in Away (2025), the directorial debut of his coach Gerard Oms, Casas landed another Goya nomination and won the Gaudí Award for Best Actor.

In April 2026, his sophomore directorial effort A puño descubierto (starring Casas and his brother Óscar) began filming. Set against the backdrop of mixed martial arts, the story accounts "how two brothers relate to violence".

== Personal life ==
Mario Casas is the older sibling of actor Óscar Casas, who has sometimes played younger versions of Mario's characters in some works. Mario Casas is reported to have been in relationships with several fellow castmates including Erika Sanz, Amaia Salamanca, María Valverde, Berta Vázquez, Blanca Suárez, and Déborah François.

== Filmography ==
=== Film ===
| Year | Title | Role | Notes | Ref. |
|---|---|---|---|---|
| 2006 | El camino de los ingleses (Summer Rain) | Moratalla | | |
| 2009 | Mentiras y gordas (Sex, Party and Lies) | Toni | | |
| 2009 | Fuga de cerebros (Brain Drain) | Emilio | | |
| 2010 | Carne de neón (Neon Flesh) | Ricky | | |
| 2010 | Tres metros sobre el cielo (Three Steps Above Heaven) | Hache | | |
| 2012 | Grupo 7 (Unit 7) | Ángel | | |
| 2012 | Tengo ganas de ti (I Want You) | Hache | Reprise of role in Three Steps Above Heaven | |
| 2013 | La mula (The Mule) | Juan Castro | | |
| 2013 | Las brujas de Zugarramurdi (Witching & Bitching) | Antonio | | |
| 2013 | Ismael | Félix | | |
| 2015 | Los 33 (The 33) | Álex Vega | | |
| 2015 | Eden | Felix | | |
| 2015 | Mi gran noche (My Great Night) | Adanne | | |
| 2015 | Palmeras en la nieve (Palm Trees in the Snow) | Kilian | | |
| 2016 | Toro | Toro | | |
| 2016 | Contratiempo (The Invisible Guest) | Adrián Doria | | |
| 2017 | El bar (The Bar) | Nacho | | |
| 2017 | Bajo la piel de lobo (The Skin of the Wolf) | Martinón | | |
| 2018 | El fotógrafo de Mauthausen (The Photographer of Mauthausen) | Francesc Boix | | |
| 2019 | Adiós (Bye) | Juan | | |
| 2020 | Hogar (The Occupant) | Tomás | | |
| 2020 | El practicante (The Paramedic) | Ángel | | |
| 2020 | No matarás (Cross the Line) | Dani | | |
| 2023 | Mi soledad tiene alas (Caged Wings) | —N/a | Director and writer | |
| 2023 | Bird Box Barcelona | Sebastián | | |
| 2024 | Escape | N. | | |
| 2025 | El secreto del orfebre (The Goldsmith's Secret) | Juan Pablo | | |
| 2025 | Molt lluny (Away) | Sergio | | |
| 2025 | La cena (The Dinner) | Teniente Medina | | |
| 2026 | Zeta (Agent Zeta) | Iago / Zeta | | |
| 2026 | En nombre de otro † (Proxies) | | | |
| 2027 | A puño descubierto † | | Also director | |

=== Television ===
| Year | Title | Role | Notes | Ref. |
|---|---|---|---|---|
| 2005 | Motivos personales | Cameo | Episode: "¿El fin de Victoria Castellanos?" | |
| 2005 | Obsesión | Nicolás "Nico" Castillo | 7 episodes | |
| 2006 | Mujeres (Women) | | Episode 1. Casas appears in a television screen which airs an episode of Obsesión | |
| 2006–07 | SMS: Sin miedo a soñar | Javi Llorens | 184 episodes | |
| 2007–10; 2021 | Los hombres de Paco (Paco's Men) | Aitor Carrasco | 79 episodes | |
| 2011–13 | El barco (The Boat) | Ulises Garmendia | 43 episodes | |
| 2018 | Paquita Salas | Himself | Episode: "El secreto" | |
| 2019 | Instinto | Marco Mur | Miniseries; 8 episodes | |
| 2021 | El inocente (The Innocent) | Mateo Vidal | Miniseries; 8 episodes | |

== Accolades ==
| Year | Award | Category | Work | Result | Ref. |
|---|---|---|---|---|---|
| 2009 | 14th LesGaiCineMad Festival | LesGai Performance Award | Sex, Party and Lies | Won | |
| 2011 | 20th Actors and Actresses Union Awards | Best New Actor | Los hombres de Paco | Nominated | |
| 2011 | 61st Fotogramas de Plata | Best Film Actor | Three Steps Above Heaven | Nominated | |
| 2011 | Latin ACE Awards | Best New Actor | Three Steps Above Heaven | Won | |
| 2012 | 62nd Fotogramas de Plata | Best Television Actor | El Barco | Nominated | |
| 2012 | 1st Neox Fan Awards | Best Actor in Spanish Cinema | I Want You | Won | |
| 2014 | 1st Feroz Awards | Best Supporting Actor | Witching & Bitching | Won | |
| 2014 | 1st Feroz Awards | Best Actor | The Mule | Nominated | |
| 2014 | 69th CEC Awards | Best Actor | The Mule | Nominated | |
| 2016 | 3rd Feroz Awards | Best Supporting Actor | My Big Night | Won | |
| 2019 | 11th Gaudí Awards | Best Actor | The Photographer of Mauthausen | Nominated | |
| 2021 | 26th Forqué Awards | Best Actor | Cross the Line | Nominated | |
| 2021 | 8th Feroz Awards | Best Actor in a Film | Cross the Line | Won | |
| 2021 | 35th Goya Awards | Best Actor | Cross the Line | Won | |
| 2021 | 13th Gaudí Awards | Best Actor | Cross the Line | Won | |
| 2024 | 30th Forqué Awards | Best Actor in a Film | Escape | Nominated | |
| 2025 | 28th Málaga Film Festival | Silver Biznaga for Best Actor | Away | Won | |
| 2025 | 31st Forqué Awards | Best Actor in a Film | Away | Nominated | |
| 2026 | 13th Feroz Awards | Best Main Actor in a Film | Away | Nominated | |
| 2026 | 18th Gaudí Awards | Best Actor | Away | Won | |
| 2026 | 40th Goya Awards | Best Actor | Away | Nominated | |
| 2026 | 34th Actors and Actresses Union Awards | Best Film Actor in a Leading Role | Away | Nominated | |
