= El barco (TV series) =

Spanish television series

- Genre: Action; Mystery; Drama; Science fiction
- Created by: Álex Pina; Iván Escobar
- Written by: Álex Pina; Iván Escobar
- Directed by: David Molina; Sandra Gallego
- Starring: Mario Casas; Blanca Suárez; Irene Montalà; Luis Callejo; Juan Pablo Shuk; Iván Massagué; Marina Salas; Jan Cornet; Alba Ribas; Juanjo Artero; Neus Sanz; Bernabé Fernández; Javier Hernández; Patricia Arbués; David Seijo; Giselle Calderón
- Narrated by: Patricia Arbués
- Country of origin: Spain
- Original language: Spanish
- No. of seasons: 3
- No. of episodes: 43 (list of episodes)

Production
- Executive producer: Álex Pina
- Producer: Globomedia
- Cinematography: David Arribas
- Editors: Raúl Mora; David Pereira (editor)
- Running time: 73-104 minutes (approx.)

Original release
- Network: Antena 3
- Release: January 17, 2011 – February 21, 2013

El Barco is a Spanish mystery TV series created by Álex Pina and Iván Escobar. and produced by Globomedia for Antena 3. The series was broadcast from January 17, 2011 until February 21, 2013. The series combines elements of drama, mystery and action, a formula that was very popular between 2007 and 2010.

== Plot ==
A global cataclysm, caused by a fatal accident in Geneva, Switzerland, during the implementation of a particle accelerator, leaves the crew and students of the barque school-ship Estrella Polar (North Star) isolated in a post-apocalyptic world where most of the world's landmass is now under water. The ship becomes their home in this isolated world. However, apart from the isolation, they also discover they are not alone, and must face "the others".

== Season 1 ==
The first season consisting of 13 episodes aired for the first time between January 17, 2011 and April 25, 2011, featuring Juanjo Artero, Mario Casas, Irene Montalà and Blanca Suarez, along with the rest of the cast who was present in the entire programme.

The first season starts with North Star sailing on what will be the biggest adventure of the students' lives, when a mysterious storm caused by the implementation of a particle accelerator in the middle of the night begins. Then all the crew discover that the earth as they know it is gone, that 90% of the surface is water, and to be in that boat is the only way to stay alive. Captain Ricardo Montero and First Officer, Julian de la Cuadra, will now be responsible for the lives of the school-ship and have to make difficult decisions in extreme situations like giant fish, bird strikes, riots on board, and poisonous mists, among others. Shortly after the students discover that there is no land to arrive to, Ramiro discovers on his own that 10% of the surface is still solid land, so the crew decides to go in search of this area.

Young Ulysses and Ainhoa meet, and form a love-hate relationship. She is already in a relationship with the survival instructor, Ernesto Gamboa, and are together for several episodes. Because of this, Ulysses also begins a relationship with Dr. Julia Wilson, which lasts for a short time. They decide to end their relationships to be together, but that seems impossible when Gamboa threatens to kill Ainhoa's father and sister, so she tells Ulysses she does not want anything to do with him. Also, a relationship begins to develop between Vilma and Piti, when Piti tells Vilma he will be the father of her child. Estela falls in love with Ramiro, and when he does not return the feelings, her eyes move on to the captain, but he is already interested in the doctor, who lets her down. Salomé and the First Officer Julian de la Cuadra start a relationship, realizing that after knowing each other for so long, they are starting to falling in love. Dr. Julia tells Julian that he is showing symptoms of prostate cancer. While all this happens, Valeria and Bubble live intense adventures.

In the season finale, the crew of the North Star receive a message but find that it is originating from outer space, where astronauts aboard a space station ask for help because they will die in three hours.

== Season 2 ==
Following the success of the initial season, with an average audience of 100 million viewers, the show was renewed for a second season consisting of 17 episodes, but eventually the last 3 episodes were allocated to the third season, leaving season 2 with 14 episodes instead. The second season aired between September 8, 2011, and January 5, 2012.

Season 2 continues with the Captain Montero deciding to help the astronauts who are about to land, while an approaching hurricane of unprecedented strength endangers the ship and all aboard. After getting through the danger, the crew is able to rescue the space capsule but finds no astronauts inside. Later, the North Star discovers 4 sole survivors on a life raft from the Queen America cruise ship: Victor, Tom, Dulce, and Leonor, who are actually there to steal the airplane black box that Ulysses and de la Cuadra found at sea. After the North Star plunges down a huge waterfall, the ship encounters a massive electrical storm that ultimately saves the life of Palomares, who was gravely injured after jumping off ship to save the last bible on earth that had fallen. Another episode has Piti & Bubble finding a duck on the ship (naming it Manolito) leading to the conclusion that land may be nearby. In a later episode, they encounter another sailing ship, most likely built by the same shipbuilders as the North Star, but of Russian origin.

Ainhoa and Ulysses decide to start their relationship despite Gamboa's threats to Ainhoa. After an incident in which Ulysses savagely beats up Gamboa, Ainhoa leaves him because she does not want to be with someone violent. Although Ulysses later repents and asks for forgiveness, she walks away from him. When they find the Russian sailing ship adrift and abandoned, Ulysses decides to take it to find land on his own, only to find Ainhoa as a stowaway so that they could be together.

Piti and Vilma continue being together and their relationship evolves as it passes through several tests, but it becomes a love triangle when Palomares confesses to Vilma that he has feelings for her, and ultimately both relationships end. Salomé and First Officer de la Cuadra's relationship deepens until Salomé feels betrayed once de la Cuadra's cancer results become known. Salomé learns that Julian was hiding this information all this time and leaves him, telling him that she is pregnant. Estela is still in search of love and falls first for Ulysses, and then for Gamboa. Sol, another female student, starts to appear toward the end of the season, instilling common sense into Piti about Vilma's true feelings for him. At the end of the second season, de la Cuadra and Bubble are kidnapped, being held in a concrete room by masked people in white jumpsuits but are ultimately returned to the North Star, just as mysteriously as when they first disappeared. Dr. Wilson discovers a Christmas miracle, as de la Cuadra is cured of his cancer, leaving many questions unanswered.

== Season 3 ==
Thanks to the incredible ratings of the second series, Antena 3 renewed the series for a third season consisting of 13 episodes, but they added three more at the last minute, making this series 16 episodes. This series began on October 18, 2012, after a long wait of nine months, and features Juanjo Artero, Irene Montala, Mario Casas and Blanca Suárez, along with the rest of the cast. Series 3 includes multiple additions to the cast, among them Jan Cornet as Max, Alberto Jo Lee and Cho Sung, Héctor Alterio as Ventura and Gabriel Delgado. In this series, the North Star makes landfall. This series was filmed in Peniscola, simulating the long-awaited island they were looking for. Some scenes were still filmed in Plató as they follow the North Star. The series is also filmed in Elche, in Palmeraie, to simulate the forest around the cabin on the island. On February 2, 2013, Antena 3 reported that the programme will finally end on February 21, 2013, after three seasons.

In the third season, the search for land continues, and now more than ever, Bubble finds Manolito, who has returned to the North Star, and after examining its trajectory, he discovers that the ship always goes to the same place. After a few days there, Gamboa discovers that the city is under his feet. Ainhoa tells her father that Ulysses has disappeared a couple of days ago and the crew has found a man who happens to be Cho Sung, a Korean from the Russian ship. Shortly after the North Star finds a blip on the radar, which the crew eventually discovers to be a hotel that has remained above the water after the cataclysm. Almost four months pass, and they discover in the building that Ulysses was there, and they meet Max, the leader of the survivors that live in the building, which turns out to be a hotel in Singapore. Max gives the land coordinates to the captain, and then later promises to return, but in exchange for these coordinates he asked the captain that Ainhoa stay in the hotel. Ulysses changes his opinion of Max, although he works for the Alexandria Project, and he stays because Ulysses dated a slept with Dulce before boarding the ship and never disclosed the information to anyone. Richard and Julia decide to marry and Vilma begins to befriend Cho Sung. Soon after Bubbles finds out that Salome is his sister after reading a dedication he had written to her in a book that he wrote. Mr. Ventura, an old man, goes aboard as a stowaway with his grandson "Mouse" on the North star.

After 132 days at sea, the North Star finally spots land. De la Cuadra, Salomé, Ainhoa, Piti, Vilma, Cho Sung and Max go to the island. A few remain on the ship, which sails back to the hotel for the other survivors as promised, but just before returning, Ulysses requests assistance through the radio and a shot is heard at the end of his message. The first night on the island, Max goes to inspect the area during the rain when they hear noises outside the tents which eventually disappear, and the next day they discover that the animal that made the noises was a cow. On board the North Star, they reach the building in search of Ulysses and the others but they do not find anyone there. The captain decides to return to the island to reunite with the crew, hoping that the French ship, the one from the Alexandria Project, has arrived before them and will guide them to land. On the island, Ainhoa, Piti, Cho and Vilma search for Max, but instead of finding him they find two masked men armed with guns, which they shoot. They return and put a camera on the cow so they can see what is on the island and they find a cabin. The cabin does not look abandoned, so Ainhoa and Piti enter and alarms go off, and a short while later they find Max knocking on the door. Piti goes to warn the rest but it is too late, and he encounters the crew from the French ship taking the North Star crew hostage, and impersonates Gamboa to save them.

Bubble and Ramiro find the red folder that the Alexandria Project were looking for. Gamboa takes it from them and contacts the Alexandria Project and informs them of his findings. Once ashore, Ricardo and the others meet with the crew on the island and both groups find out everything that has happened. Then Ricardo, de la Cuadra, Salomé, Valeria and Julia go to the cabin to find Ainhoa and Max. A shootout with the crew from the French ship occurs and Valeria gets shot. Ricardo comes out and burns the red folder in front of everyone, outside the cabin. Piti is discovered to be a fraud, and they force Piti to walk with a mask on, on a path to the cabin to shoot him, but he manages to escape being shot by his own crew by placing a piece of gum to his forehead which causes de la Cuadra to remember that he put a piece of gum to Piti's forehead as punishment for being a clown on the boat. The French crew shoot Piti, but do not kill him. Cho, Palomares and Ramiro find a box dropped by a passing plane. They later encounter Ulysses who joins them in helping their other crew members who are being attacked by the French crew. Palomares and Ramiro go to Piti in the middle of the crossfire by protecting themselves with a bathtub. Ulysses and Max know it is important to save Valeria but on the way they are followed by the crew from the French ship. Ulysses stays to fight them and Max goes to the ship. Max sneaks aboard the boat. Bubbles reconnects with Marimar, is obligated to impersonate Roberto, by Gamboa, to save the crew because they have destroyed the red folder. Gamboa is reunited with his daughter, but is blackmailed by Alexander who asks him to assassinate Ulysses. Gamboa gets off the boat and meets with Ulysses to kill him.

Ventura gets out alive from the boat because Alexander decides to spare his life and decides to take the surgical supplies to the cabin. In the cabin the French crew leave, because they have been ordered by Alexander since Bubbles, impersonating Roberto, gives them the information from the red folder. Ulysses, on the other hand, encounters Gamboa, and decides to leave his gun on the ground to go by boat to reach the North Star. He is then surprised by Gamboa in the water with a gun and Ulysses discovers that Gamboa plans to kill him. He calls his girlfriend Ainhoa over the radio to bid her farewell and Gamboa shots three bullets into his chest.

The series ends in an epilogue. The story flashes forward 380 days and shows Captain Ricardo Montero driving a van. Julia is sitting in front and in back is Salomé with her son (named Roberto), in the middle is Valeria and on the other side sits Julian. They go to a place and get out of the van to see Ainhoa wearing a wedding dress and the captain asks where the groom is. We then see an image of Ulysses enjoying the sea, wearing a white shirt, showing that he is the groom. Then voiceovers from Ainhoa and Ulysses begin to tell the ending: "Because no atomic bomb, particle accelerator (can destroy love). Neither can three shots to the chest nor a well-intentioned lie." Ramiro gets with Estela. Captain Montero and Dr. Julia decide to have another child, which make it that Valeria is no longer the youngest. Vilma marries Cho. Cho speaks to the child in Korean and Vilma in Spanish which will lead the child to have a funny accent. Piti became a caretaker and godfather to Cho and Vilma's child. Mouse's grandfather, Mr. Ventura, died with a smile on his face and was deeply missed by everyone. Mouse is adopted by Max, who says "he wants to be just like him." Palomares built a church out of branches but it constantly falls down during storms. Gamboa is never heard from again, but it is suspected that he is living on the other side of the island with his daughter. Marimar and Bubbles get back together, and Marimar is not bothered by his accident. Ulysses and Ainhoa's love story could not be stopped by Gamboa's bullets, and we hear their wedding vows. It was revealed that when Bubbles was Roberto Schneider he created an infection that poisoned the lungs, but also created an antidote that he hid in the red folder. Everything ends with an earthquake and a new magnetic field disturbance, and the Captain says that it "has begun again."

== Cast ==
=== Protagonists ===
- Mario Casas as Ulises Garmendia/Ulises de la Cuadra
- Blanca Suárez as Ainhoa Montero
- Irene Montalà as Julia Wilson
- Luis Callejo as Julián de la Cuadra
- Iván Massagué as Roberto "Burbuja" Cardeñosa
- Juan Pablo Shuk as Ernesto Gamboa
- Marina Salas as Vilma Llorente
- Jan Cornet as Máximo Delgado
- Alba Ribas as Elena/Sol Torres
- Juanjo Artero as Captain Ricardo Montero.
- Patricia Arbués as Valeria Montero
- Neus Sanz as Salomé Palacios
- Bernabé Fernández as Andrés Palomares
- Javier Hernández as Pedro "Piti" Gironés
- David Seijo as Ramiro Medina
- Giselle Calderón as Estela Montes
- María Cantue as Marimar

=== Participations ===
- Héctor Alterio as Ventura Zúñiga
- Belén Rueda as Leonor
- Daniel Ortiz as Víctor
- Paloma Bloyd as Dulce
- Leticia Dolera as Marimar
- Nerea Camacho as Sandra
- Algis Arlauskas as Alexander Montes
- Alberto Jo Lee as Cho Sung
- Àlex Maruny as Cristóbal Monsalvo
- Javier Santiago as Eduardo Martínez
- Guillermo Barriento as Tom
- Christophe Miraval as Philippe
- Cristina Rodríguez as Marisa
- Amanda Ferrer as Evelyn
- Ramiro Blas as Teo
- Ferran Font Benito as Patricio
- Maarten Dannenberg as Javi
- Mario Makón as Alí
- Cedric Sester as Sicario
- Gabriel Ángel Delgado as "Ratón"
- Carlos Acosta-Milian as Gamboa Family Killer

== Production ==
The filming of the Estrella Polar was done aboard the Cervantes Saavedra. It was launched as a lightvessel named Sydostbrotten (Nr 33) 1934 from the Swedish shipyard Götaverken, in Gothenburg. In 1970, the ship was sold and refitted at the Aveiro shipyard in Portugal. The refit converted the vessel into an iron-hulled barquentine with three masts and a bowsprit. Her length is now 48.5 m (159 ft), with a 7.8 m (26 ft) beam and 4.6 m (15 ft) draft.

== Series overview ==
Season	Episodes	Originally aired	
Season	Episodes	First aired	Last aired
1	13	January 17, 2011	April 25, 2011
2	14	September 8, 2011	January 5, 2012
3	16	October 18, 2012	February 21, 2013

== Episodes ==
=== Season 1 (2011) ===
No. overall	No. in season	Title	Original release date	Prod. code	Viewers (millions)
1	1	"A Million Miles"	January 17, 2011	101	4.76
2	2	"Gone Fishing"	January 24, 2011	102	4.32
3	3	"The Ghost Pirate"	January 31, 2011	103	4.18
4	4	"A World Under the Sea"	February 7, 2011	104	4.10
5	5	"The Falcon's Cry"	February 14, 2011	105	3.83
6	6	"Elections"	February 21, 2011	106	4.01
7	7	"Lost"	February 28, 2011	107	3.82
8	8	"Blue Water Fishing"	March 7, 2011	108	4.07
9	9	"A Blip on the Radar"	March 21, 2011	109	3.99
10	10	"Fog"	March 28, 2011	110	4.30
11	11	"The Law of the Sea"	April 4, 2011	111	4.17
12	12	"The Man from Liverpool"	April 11, 2011	112	3.99
13	13	"Waiting for a Miracle"	April 25, 2011	113	4.20

=== Season 2 (2011–12) ===
No. overall	No. in season	Title	Original release date	Prod. code	Viewers (millions)
14	1	"We're Not Alone"	September 8, 2011	201	2
15	2	"The Dark Visitor"	September 15, 2011	202	2.70
16	3	"The Last Boat of America Queen"	September 22, 2011	203	2.91
17	4	"Bobby Bear's guts"	September 29, 2011	204	2.69
18	5	"Who Fears the Wolf?"	October 6, 2011	205	3.05
19	6	"Shrimp That Falls Asleep..."	October 13, 2011	206	3.08
20	7	"Feet on the Ground"	October 20, 2011	207	3.16
21	8	"The Mermaid"	October 27, 2011	208	2.98
22	9	"The Priest and Dr. Frankenstein"	November 3, 2011	209	3.02
23	10	"The Strange Case of Manolito the Duck"	November 10, 2011	210	2.90
24	11	"Ghosts"	November 17, 2011	211	3.08
25	12	"The Ship on the Mirror"	November 24, 2011	212	2.89
26	13	"Lies and Cabaret"	December 1, 2011	213	3.16
27	14	"Twelfth night"	January 5, 2012	214	2.10

=== Season 3 (2012/13) ===
No. overall	No. in season	Title	Original release date	Prod. code	Viewers (millions)
28	1	"The Honorable Passenger"	October 18, 2012	215	3.35
29	2	"The Art of War"	October 25, 2012	216	3.03
30	3	"Light which Conceals"	November 1, 2012	217	2.57
31	4	"100 meters of land"	November 8, 2012	301	3.15
32	5	"The World's Ruler"	November 15, 2012	302	2.81
33	6	"Fukushima Blues"	November 22, 2012	303	2.98
34	7	"The wedding"	November 29, 2012	304	2.80
35	8	"Who is who"	December 13, 2012	305	2.59
36	9	"The Energy that moves the World"	December 20, 2012	306	2.48
37	10	"What's Left of the World"	January 10, 2013	307	2.25
38	11	"Secrets"	January 17, 2013	308	2.25
39	12	"Nothing Here"	January 24, 2013	309	2.01
40	13	"The Cat and the Mouse"	January 31, 2013	310	2.16
41	14	"A Noise in the Sky"	February 7, 2013	311	2.21
42	15	"Out of this world"	February 14, 2013	312	2.32
43	16	"The Last Bullet"	February 21, 2013	313	2.61
