= Anna Simon =

Spanish TV host

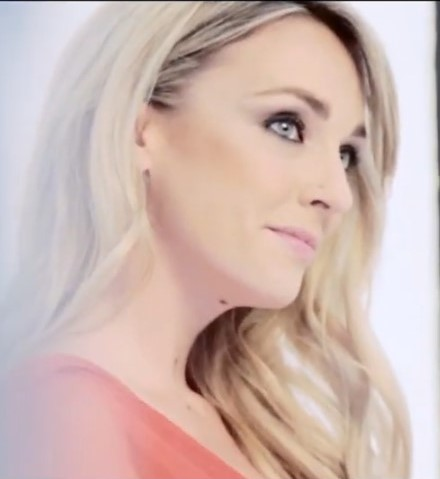
- Simon in 2015
- Born: 9 August 1982 (age 43); Mollet del Vallès, Catalonia, Spain
- Occupation: TV host

Anna Simón Marí (Mollet del Vallès, Barcelona, 9 August 1982) is a Spanish TV host. She has a degree in journalism.

On 17 January 2005, at the age of 22, she started featuring on TV channel Teletaxi TV. After a brief stint in call TV programs, she appeared in the satirical news program Estas no son las noticias on Cuatro. She appeared in two afternoon magazines in TV3, Tvist and Divendres (2009-2010). In 2010 she became one of the hosts (along with Florentino Fernández and Dani Martínez) of the "silly" comedy program Tonterías las justas) (Cuatro, 2010) as well as its spiritual sequel Otra movida) (Neox, 2011).

She was in the sixth position of singers imitation contest Tu cara me suena on Antena 3 and in September 2012 she joined as a partner of El Hormiguero in the same channel.

On 19 February 2013 she became the host of the comedy program Así nos va, along with Florentino Fernández on laSexta until June 2013. She was also the host of the magic contest program Por arte de magia on Antena 3 from September to October 2013. Since 2014 she has appeared in the comedy program Zapeando on laSexta.
