= María Valverde =

Spanish actress

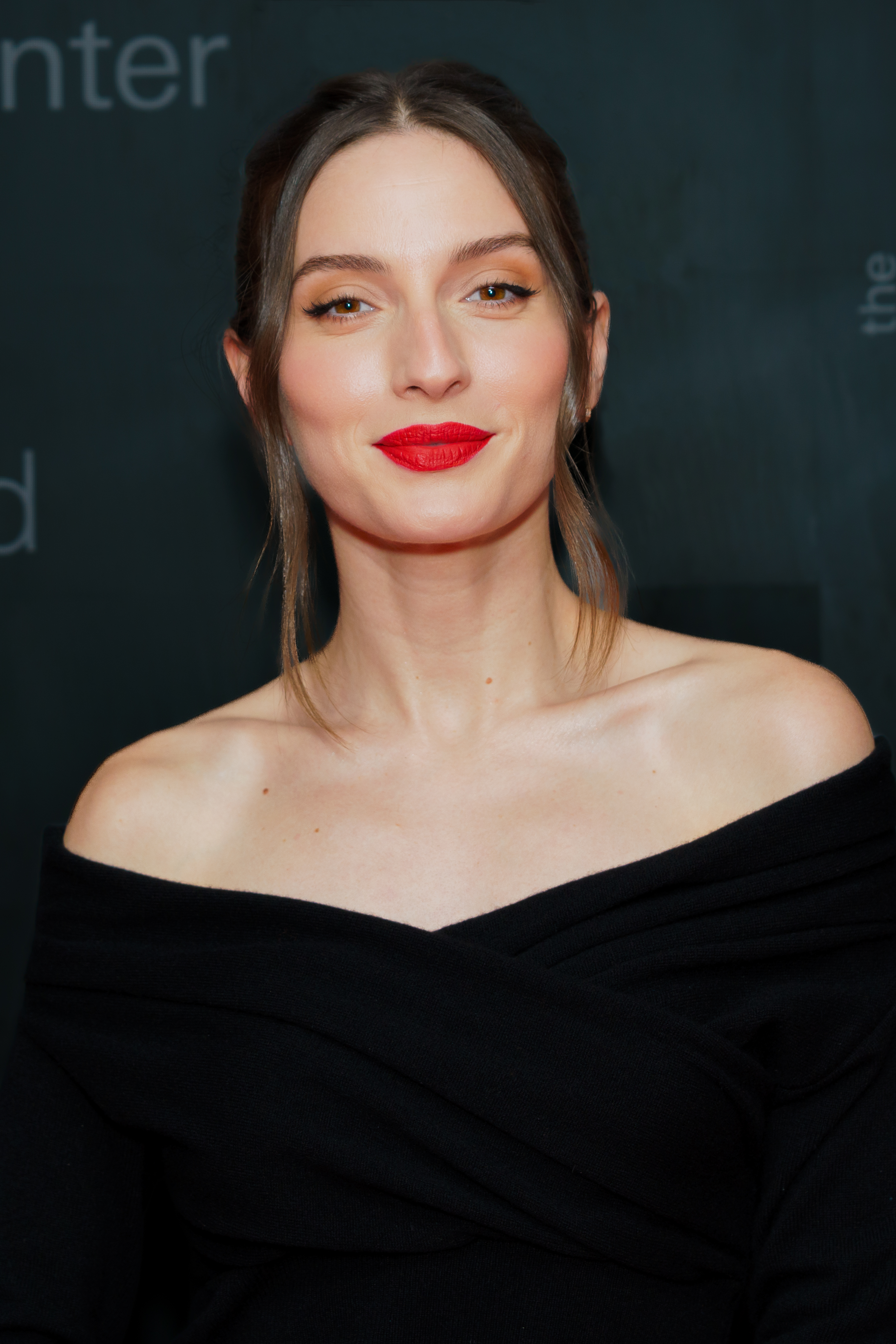
- Valverde in 2025
- Born: María Valverde Rodríguez; 24 March 1987 (age 39); Madrid, Spain
- Occupation: Actress
- Years active: 2003–present
- Spouse: Gustavo Dudamel (m. 2017)

María Valverde Rodríguez (born 24 March 1987) is a Spanish actress. Her feature film acting debut in The Weakness of the Bolshevik (2003) earned her a Goya Award for Best New Actress.

== Early life ==
María Valverde was born in Madrid on 24 March 1987.

== Career ==
At age 16, Valverde had her feature film debut in The Weakness of the Bolshevik, for which she won Best New Actress at the 18th Goya Awards. Her other films include Melissa P., based on the book One Hundred Strokes of the Brush Before Bed by Melissa Panarello, and Three Steps Above Heaven.

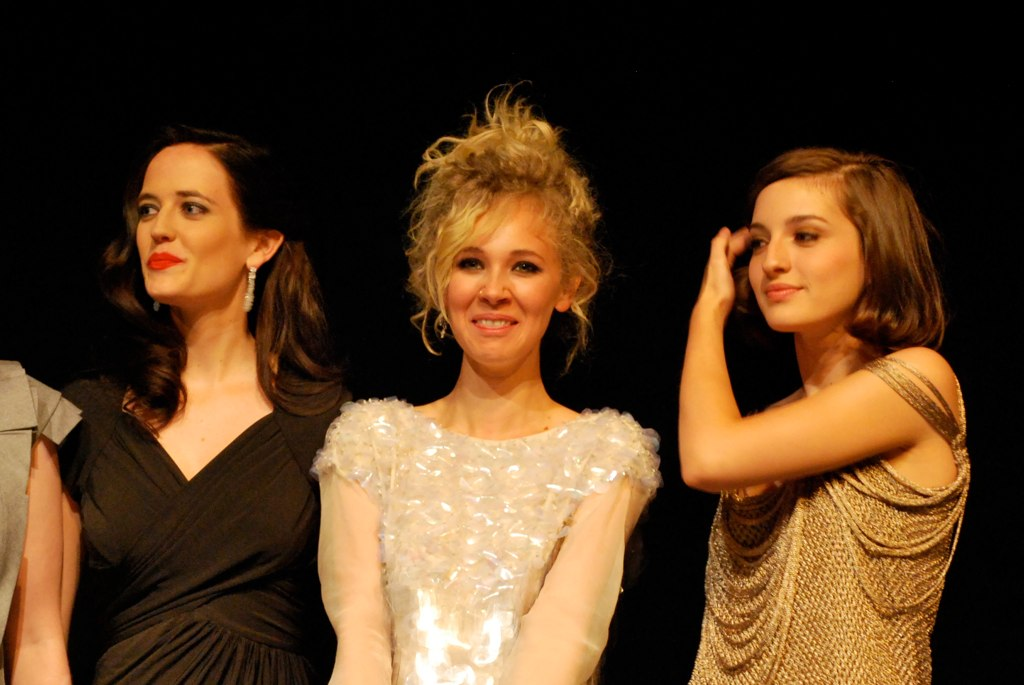
Valverde (right) along with fellow Cracks cast members Eva Green and Juno Temple during the 2009 TIFF

Valverde's films in English include the 2009 independent British drama film Cracks, produced by Ridley Scott and directed by his daughter, Jordan Scott, and the 2014 film Exodus: Gods and Kings playing Zipporah, directed by Ridley Scott, alongside Christian Bale, Joel Edgerton, Sigourney Weaver, and Ben Kingsley. In 2015, she played the lead in the drama Broken Horses, co-starring with Anton Yelchin.

== Personal life ==
From 2009 to 2014 Valverde was in a relationship with the Spanish actor Mario Casas with whom she starred in three movies. In March 2017, Valverde married Venezuelan conductor Gustavo Dudamel.

== Filmography ==
=== Film ===
Year	Title	Role	Notes	Ref.
2003	La flaqueza del bolchevique (The Weakness of the Bolshevik)	María	Goya Award for Best New Actress	
2004	Fuera del cuerpo (Body Confusion)	Cuca		
2005	Vorvik	Sofía		
2005	Melissa P.	Melissa Panarello		
2006	Los Borgia (The Borgia)	Lucrecia Borgia		
2007	Ladrones (Thieves)	Sara		
2007	El rey de la montaña (King of the Hill)	Bea		
2007	El hombre de arena (The Sandman)	Lola		
2008	La mujer del anarquista (The Anarchist's Wife)	Manuela		
2009	Cracks	Fiamma Coronna		
2010	Tres metros sobre el cielo (Three Steps Above Heaven)	Bárbara Alcázar "Babi"		
2011	Madrid, 1987	Ángela		
2012	A puerta fría (Cold Call)	Inés		
2012	Tengo ganas de ti (I Want You)	Babi		
2013	La mula (The Mule)	Conchi		
2013	Libertador (The Liberator)	María Teresa Rodríguez del Toro		
2014	Exodus: Gods and Kings	Zipporah		
2015	Broken Horses	Vittoria		
2015	Ahora o nunca (It's Now or Never)	Eva		
2016	La carga	Elisa		
2016	Ali and Nino	Nino Kipiani		
2016	Guernica	Teresa		
2016	The Limehouse Golem	Aveline		
2017	Back to Burgundy	Alicia		
2017	Plonger	Paz Aguilera		
2018	Galveston	Carmen		
2019	Spider	Young Inés		
2021	Fever Dream	Amanda		
2021	Fuimos canciones (Sounds Like Love)	Maca		

=== Television ===
Year	Title	Role
2012	La fuga	Anna Serra
2013	Hermanos	Virginia Rodríguez
2026	The Final Problem	Adela Figueroa

== Accolades ==
Year	Award	Category	Work	Result	Ref.
2004	18th Goya Awards	Best New Actress	The Weakness of the Bolshevik	Won	
2004	13th Actors and Actresses Union Awards	Best New Actress	The Weakness of the Bolshevik	Nominated	
