= Locked Up season 2 =

Locked Up
- Season 2
- Promotional poster
- Starring: Maggie Civantos; Najwa Nimri; Carlos Hipólito; Roberto Enríquez; Berta Vázquez; Alba Flores; Cristina Plazas; Inma Cuevas; María Isabel Díaz Lago; María Salgueiro; Ramiro Blas; Marta Aledo; Laura Baena; Daniel Ortiz; Alberto Velasco; Harlys Becerra
- No. of episodes: 13

Release
- Original network: Antena 3
- Original release: March 31 – June 22, 2016

Season chronology
- ← Previous; Season 1 Next → Season 3

The second season of the Spanish crime drama television series Vis a Vis premiered on March 31, 2016 and aired its last episode on June 22, 2016, consisting of 13 episodes. It was broadcast by Antena 3 in Spain. The season was executive produced by Globomedia.

The season's storylines include Zulema (Najwa Nimri), Saray (Alba Flores) and a reluctant Macarena's (Maggie Civantos) escape from prison and its consequences. Following Sandoval's (Ramiro Blas) recommendations, prison director Miranda (Cristina Plazas) imposes stricter rules and regulations in response to the inmates' escape. With authority from the director to use any measures to discipline inmates, some prison guards abuse their power. Macarena and her family face consequences for their involvement with the Egyptian.

The season and cast received several accolades, including six nominations and two wins from the Spanish Actors Union Awards, five nominations from the Feroz Awards, and two nominations and a win from Fotogramas de Plata. After the season's airing, Antena 3 cancelled their broadcast of the series, after which Fox Spain pick up the series for a third and fourth season and an additional spinoff.

== Cast and characters ==
=== Cruz Del Sur Inmates ===
- Maggie Civantos as Macarena Ferreiro
- Najwa Nimri as Zulema Zahir
- Berta Vázquez as Estefania "Rizos" Kabila
- Alba Flores as Saray Vargas de Jesús
- Inma Cuevas as Ana Belén "Anabel" Villaroch Garcés
- María Isabel Díaz Lago as Soledad "Sole" Núñez Hurtado
- Marta Aledo as Teresa "Tere" González Largo
- Laura Baena as Antonia Trujillo Díez

=== Cruz del Sur Employees ===
- Roberto Enríquez as Fabio Martínez León
- Ramiro Blas as Carlos Sandoval Castro
- Cristina Plazas as Miranda Aguirre Senén
- Alberto Velasco as Antonio Palacios Lloret
- Harlys Becerra as Ismael Valbuena Ugarte

=== Macarena's Family ===
- Carlos Hipólito as Leopoldo Ferreiro Lobo
- María Salgueiro as Encarna Molina
- Daniel Ortiz as Román Ferreiro Molina

=== Police Force ===
- Jesús Castejón as Inspector Damián Castillo

=== Recurring Cast and Guests ===
- Dunia Rodríguez as María Prieto "Casper" Téllez
- Sonia Almarcha as Lidia Osborne
- Irene Arcos as Carolina
- Hugo Guzmán as Camilo Jalapeño
- Verónika Moral as Helena Martín
- Jose Javier Domínguez as Inspector Pipiolo
- Carmen Baquero as Alba Vargas de Jesús
- Olivia Delcán as Cristina "Bambi" Marquina
- Mona Martínez as Carlota "Governor"
- Elena Seijo as Susana Tamayo Román
- Sara Vidorreta as Amaia Jiménez
- Rafael Núñez as Fernando

== Episode list ==
No. overall	No. in season	Title	English title	Directed by	Original release date	Viewers (millions)
12	1	"Puta madre"	"Two guns for One Monkey"	Jesús Colmenar	March 31, 2016	2.8 (16.2%)
13	2	"Hogar, dulce hogar"	"Home Sweet Home"	Jesús Rodrigo	April 7, 2016	2.5 (13.8%)
14	3	"La gallinita"	"The Little Hen"	Sandra Gallego	April 14, 2016	2.5 (13.8%)
15	4	"La teoría de Darwin"	"A Body in the Trunk"	Jesús Colmenar	April 21, 2016	2.2 (12.2%)
16	5	"En la línea de fuego"	"In the line of fire I"	Jesús Rodrigo	April 27, 2016	2.3 (13.2%)
17	6	"Los Mandriles"	"The Baboons"	Sandra Gallego & Jesús Colmenar	May 4, 2016	2.3 (13.4%)
18	7	"Bon appétit"	"A Field Day"	Jesús Colmenar & Jesús Rodrigo	May 11, 2016	2.6 (15.0%)
19	8	"La vida sigue"	"Life Goes On"	Jesús Rodrigo & Sandra Gallego	May 18, 2016	2.4 (13.8%)
20	9	"Pillarse los dedos"	"Getting Your Fingers Burned"	Jesús Colmenar & Álex Rodrigo	May 25, 2016	2.3 (13.2%)
21	10	"Pecados y confesiones"	"Sins and Confusions"	Sandra Gallego & Jesús Rodrigo	June 1, 2016	2.2 (12.6%)
22	11	"Patrona de los desamparados"	"Patron of the Desperate"	Jesús Colmenar & Álex Rodrigo	June 8, 2016	2.5 (15.1%)
23	12	"Plátano y limón"	"Banana and Lemon"	Jesús Rodrigo & Sandra Gallego	June 15, 2016	2.3 (14.4%)
24	13	"Líquido"	"Liquid"	Jesús Colmenar, Álex Rodrigo & Sandra Gallego	June 22, 2016	2.7 (16.4%)

== Awards and nominations ==
Year	Award	Category	Nominees	Result	Ref.
2017	Spanish Actors Union Awards	Best Female Lead Performance	Maggie Civantos	Nominated	
2017	Spanish Actors Union Awards	Best Female Lead Performance	Najwa Nimri	Nominated	
2017	Spanish Actors Union Awards	Best Male Lead Performance	Roberto Enriquez	Nominated	
2017	Spanish Actors Union Awards	Best Female Performance in Supporting Role	Alba Flores	Won	
2017	Spanish Actors Union Awards	Best Female Performance in Minor Role	Inma Cuevas	Won	
2017	Spanish Actors Union Awards	Best Female Performance in Minor Role	Maria Isabel Díaz	Nominated	
2017	Feroz Awards	Best Drama Series	Vis a vis	Nominated	
2017	Feroz Awards	Best Lead Actress	Maggie Civantos	Nominated	
2017	Feroz Awards	Best Lead Actress	Najwa Nimri	Nominated	
2017	Feroz Awards	Best Supporting Actress	Alba Flores	Nominated	
2017	Feroz Awards	Best Supporting Actress	Inma Cuevas	Nominated	
2017	Fotogramas de Plata	Audience Award for Best Spanish Series	Vis a vis	Won	
2017	Fotogramas de Plata	Best TV Actress	Najwa Nimri	Nominated	
2017	Premios Fenix Awards	Best TV Ensemble	Vis a vis	Nominated	
