= Los hombres de Paco =

Spanish television series

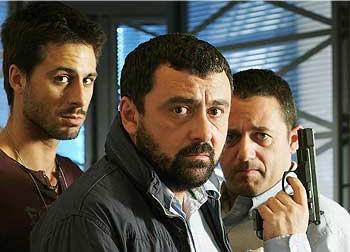
- Cast of Los hombres de Paco
- Genre: Comedy drama
- Created by: Daniel Écija; Álex Pina
- Starring: See the cast list
- Opening theme: "Nada que perder" by Pignoise
- Country of origin: Spain
- Original language: Spanish
- No. of seasons: 10
- No. of episodes: 133 (list of episodes)

Production
- Camera setup: Multicamera
- Running time: 80 min. (approx.)
- Production companies: Globomedia; Atresmedia TV

Original release
- Network: Antena 3; Atresplayer Premium
- Release: 9 October 2005 – 16 December 2021

Related
- Tutti per Bruno

Los hombres de Paco (English: Paco's Men) is a Spanish television series that originally aired from 9 October 2005 to 19 May 2010 on Antena 3. A tenth season was aired from 10 May 2021 to 16 December 2021. Created by Daniel Écija and Álex Pina, it stars numerous actors; primarily Paco Tous and Pepón Nieto. The fiction primarily focused on a group of clumsy yet good-hearted police agents.

== General ==
The fiction focused on a group of police officers in San Antonio, a fictitious neighborhood in Madrid, originally following a trio of clumsy yet good-hearted police agents: Paco, Mariano and Lucas, overseen by Don Lorenzo Castro Riquelme. The "forbidden" love story between Lucas and Sara (Paco's daughter) was another of the main storylines of the series, later turned into a love triangle with the addition of Aitor. Season 6 featured a big jumping the shark moment, by retconning the non-death of Lucas.

Seasons six through eight of the series centered on a lesbian relationship between officer María Jose "Pepa" Miranda Ramos and forensic scientist Silvia Castro León. Season 8 ended with a finale, "Todos los planes de Lucas Fernández", that brought the wedding of Pepa and Silvia, which resulted in a bloodbath and the tragic death of four main characters (Silvia, Montoya, Nelson and Quique).

In season 9, dubbed as Los hombres de Paco 66.6, the series jumped the shark again, taking a supernatural turn by bringing Silvia back from the dead as a phantasmagorical apparition and pitting the lead characters against Satan.

== Episodes ==
| Series | Episodes | Originally released | | | Average viewership | Share (%) |
| Series | Episodes | First released | Last released | Network | Average viewership | Share (%) |
|---|---|---|---|---|---|---|
| 1 | 13 | 9 October 2005 | 9 March 2006 | Antena 3 | 3,518,000 | 20.5 |
| 2 | 14 | 16 March 2006 | 28 June 2006 | Antena 3 | 3,421,000 | 20.8 |
| 3 | 13 | 10 January 2007 | 11 March 2007 | Antena 3 | 4,019,000 | 23.0 |
| 4 | 13 | 18 April 2007 | 25 July 2007 | Antena 3 | 3,565,000 | 21.7 |
| 5 | 13 | 8 January 2008 | 15 April 2008 | Antena 3 | 3,429,000 | 20.6 |
| 6 | 13 | 22 April 2008 | 1 October 2008 | Antena 3 | 3,216,000 | 19.0 |
| 7 | 13 | 6 January 2009 | 1 April 2009 | Antena 3 | 2,914,000 | 16.4 |
| 8 | 12 | 15 April 2009 | 15 July 2009 | Antena 3 | 2,692,000 | 16.6 |
| 9 | 13 | 17 February 2010 | 19 May 2010 | Antena 3 | 1,827,000 | 11.4 |
| 10 | 16 | 10 May 2021 | 16 December 2021 | Antena 3 & Atresplayer | 741,000 | 8.3 |

=== Season 1 ===
| No. | Title | Original Air | Audience | Share |
|---|---|---|---|---|
| 001 | "La suerte" | 9 October 2005 | 3.711.000 | 22,0% |
| 002 | "La paranoia" | 16 October 2005 | 3.596.000 | 20,8% |
| 003 | "La mentira" | 23 October 2005 | 3.368.000 | 20,1% |
| 004 | "Operación Pikachu" | 30 October 2005 | 3.238.000 | 19,9% |
| 005 | "El instinto" | 6 November 2005 | 2.800.000 | 17,1% |
| 006 | "El apocalipsis" | 13 November 2005 | 3.091.000 | 17,3% |
| 007 | "El brillo del oropel" | 20 November 2005 | 3.010.000 | 16,6% |
| 008 | "Un lugar en el mundo" | 27 November 2005 | 3.320.000 | 17,8% |
| 009 | "El silencio de los maderos" | 9 February 2006 | 3.810.000 | 22,3% |
| 010 | "La mafia calabresa" | 16 February 2006 | 4.083.000 | 24,5% |
| 011 | "Con faja y a lo loco" | 23 February 2006 | 3.630.000 | 21,6% |
| 012 | "Vade retro, Satanás" | 2 March 2006 | 4.042.000 | 23,6% |
| 013 | "Veni, vidi, chichi" | 9 March 2006 | 4.039.000 | 23,7% |

=== Season 2 ===
| No. | Title | Original Air | Audience | Share |
|---|---|---|---|---|
| 014 | "Amigos hasta la muerte" | 16 March 2006 | 3.888.000 | 23,7% |
| 015 | "Con escarcha en el pelo" | 23 March 2006 | 3.556.000 | 20,8% |
| 016 | "Tigre y dramón" | 29 March 2006 | 4.127.000 | 23,3% |
| 017 | "Rollito de primavera" | 5 April 2006 | 4.047.000 | 23,7% |
| 018 | "Aterriza con las muelas" | 19 April 2006 | 3.399.000 | 21,7% |
| 019 | "Todo el mundo al suelo" | 3 May 2006 | 3.405.000 | 19,4% |
| 020 | "La famiglia" | 10 May 2006 | 3.024.100 | 19,5% |
| 021 | "Sin tregua" | 17 May 2006 | 2.735.000 | 17,4% |
| 022 | "Pleno al quince" | 24 May 2006 | 3.608.000 | 21,1% |
| 023 | "Los hombres de Osama" | 31 May 2006 | 3.510.000 | 20,4% |
| 024 | "De la fosa al pilón" | 7 June 2006 | 2.595.000 | 18,0% |
| 025 | "Tarde de toros" | 14 June 2006 | 3.179.000 | 19,0% |
| 026 | "El código Vicente" | 21 June 2006 | 3.267.000 | 20,6% |
| 027 | "Bajo tierra" | 28 June 2006 | 3.556.000 | 23,3% |

=== Season 3 ===
| No. | Title | Original Air | Audience | Share |
|---|---|---|---|---|
| Film | "Regalo de cumpleaños" | 4 January 2007 | 2.118.000 | 20,7% |
| 028 | "Vértigo" | 10 January 2007 | 4.225.000 | 22,8% |
| 029 | "Ración de oreja" | 17 January 2007 | 4.335.000 | 24,4% |
| 030 | "Todo tiene arreglo" | 24 January 2007 | 4.450.000 | 24,6% |
| 031 | "El madero biónico" | 31 January 2007 | 4.378.000 | 24,0% |
| 032 | "Cariño y metadona" | 7 February 2007 | 3.610.000 | 22,1% |
| 033 | "Un día tonto lo tiene cualquiera" | 14 February 2007 | 4.013.000 | 23,2% |
| 034 | "¿En qué día mi vida se convirtió en un sueño?" | 21 February 2007 | 4.074.000 | 22,7% |
| 035 | "Expediente Berni" | 28 February 2007 | 3.594.000 | 21,0% |
| 036 | "Cuando Rita encontró a Pove" | 7 March 2007 | 3.541.000 | 22,5% |
| 037 | "El chorro polar" | 14 March 2007 | 3.972.000 | 23,3% |
| 038 | "El tío Walt" | 21 March 2007 | 3.814.000 | 22,4% |
| 039 | "El yaloví" | 28 March 2007 | 3.813.000 | 21,6% |
| 040 | "Padre no hay más que uno" | 11 March 2007 | 4.428.000 | 25,3% |

=== Season 4 ===
| No. | Title | Original Air | Audience | Share |
|---|---|---|---|---|
| 041 | "Todo sobre mi padre" | 18 April 2007 | 3.832.000 | 21,1% |
| 042 | "La Ramona" | 25 April 2007 | 3.622.000 | 20,4% |
| 043 | "El regreso de Nosferatu" | 2 May 2007 | 3.482.000 | 18,8% |
| 044 | "Maracanazo" | 9 May 2007 | 3.558.000 | 20,7% |
| TV MOVIE | "Historia de un engaño" | 23 May 2007 | 1.680.000 | 13,4% |
| 045 | "Los corruptibles" | 30 May 2007 | 3.445.000 | 20,1% |
| 046 | "El vuelo del comisario" | 6 June 2007 | 3.517.000 | 20,1% |
| 047 | "La calcomanía" | 13 June 2007 | 3.877.000 | 22,1% |
| 048 | "Poli duro, poli blando" | 20 June 2007 | 3.617.000 | 21,3% |
| 049 | "Y si Adelita se fuera con otro" | 27 June 2007 | 3.403.000 | 20,7% |
| 050 | "Un año, tres meses y cuatro días" | 4 July 2007 | 3.538.000 | 22,6% |
| 051 | "Los GAL de San Antonio" | 11 July 2007 | 3.223.000 | 22,3% |
| 052 | "La ola de calor" | 18 July 2007 | 3.103.000 | 22,4% |
| 053 | "La traca final" | 25 July 2007 | 4.130.000 | 30,6% |

=== Season 5 ===
| No. | Title | Original Air | Audience | Share |
|---|---|---|---|---|
| 054 | "El click" | 8 January 2008 | 4.184.000 | 24,3% |
| 055 | "Comisario Miranda" | 15 January 2008 | 3.316.000 | 19,5% |
| 056 | "La lista de Paco" | 22 January 2008 | 3.397.000 | 18,7% |
| 057 | "Levanta o revienta" | 29 January 2008 | 3.378.000 | 21,0% |
| 058 | "La noche del comisario" | 5 February 2008 | 3.611.000 | 20,2% |
| 059 | "La naturaleza del escorpión" | 12 February 2008 | 3.566.000 | 20,0% |
| 060 | "El inspector de paja" | 19 February 2008 | 3.133.000 | 20,5% |
| 061 | "Lagarto, lagarto..." | 26 February 2008 | 3.468.000 | 21,7% |
| 062 | "Comisario de día, pordiosero de noche" | 11 March 2008 | 3.309.000 | 20,5% |
| TV MOVIE | "Mi historia con Lucas (vol. 1)" | 18 March 2008 | 2.473.000 | 16,1% |
| 063 | "Las últimas palabras de Julio Olmedo" | 25 March 2008 | 3.507.000 | 21,8% |
| 064 | "La ratonera" | 1 April 2008 | 3.438.000 | 21,1% |
| 065 | "Vivir tapando" | 8 April 2008 | 2.913.000 | 18,8% |
| 066 | "Testigo de ultratumba" | 15 April 2008 | 3.365.000 | 20,0% |

=== Season 6 ===
| No. | Title | Original Air | Audience | Share |
|---|---|---|---|---|
| 067 | "El método Yamasuki" | 22 April 2008 | 2.817.000 | 17,9% |
| 068 | "Miranda al natural" | 6 May 2008 | 3.341.000 | 19,4% |
| 069 | "Las reglas del juego" | 13 May 2008 | 3.282.000 | 18,3% |
| 070 | "El amor FÚ" | 20 May 2008 | 3.015.000 | 17,0% |
| 071 | "La bomba en casa" | 27 May 2008 | 3.123.000 | 16,9% |
| 072 | "Topo asoma" | 2 June 2008 | 3.359.000 | 17,8% |
| 073 | "El canuto de la verdad" | 10 June 2008 | 3.251.000 | 18,2% |
| 074 | "A lo oscuro" | 17 June 2008 | 2.921.000 | 16,6% |
| 075 | "Amor a chispazo limpio" | 1 July 2008 | 2.840.000 | 18,9% |
| 076 | "El setter cojo" | 8 July 2008 | 3.505.000 | 23,7% |
| TV MOVIE | "Contra las cuerdas" | 10 September 2008 | 2.020.000 | 12,4% |
| TV MOVIE | "Mi historia con Lucas (vol. 2)" | 10 September 2008 | 1.255.000 | 13,4% |
| 077 | "Los dos entierros de Lucas Fernández" | 17 September 2008 | 3.461.000 | 20,2% |
| 078 | "El novio cadáver" | 24 September 2008 | 2.836.000 | 17,4% |
| 079 | "Tiroteo nupcial" | 1 October 2008 | 4.058.000 | 25,2% |

=== Season 7 ===
| No. | Title | Original Air | Audience | Share |
|---|---|---|---|---|
| 080 | El replay de Don Lorenzo | 6 January 2009 | 3.410.000 | 18,5% |
| 081 | El documento gagaísta | 13 January 2009 | 2.737.000 | 14,7% |
| 082 | Caldo de pollo | 22 January 2009 | 2.442.000 | 12,7% |
| 083 | El último asalto | 28 January 2009 | 3.311.000 | 18,2% |
| 084 | Un diagnóstico peregrino | 4 February 2009 | 2.593.000 | 14,8% |
| 085 | En el mismo saco | 11 February 2009 | 2.673.000 | 14,0% |
| 086 | Un adosao con vistas | 18 February 2009 | 2.921.000 | 16,4% |
| 087 | Un clavo quita otro clavo | 25 February 2009 | 3.127.000 | 19,1% |
| 088 | La de Madagascar | 4 March 2009 | 3.077.000 | 17,7% |
| 089 | Codepender day | 11 March 2009 | 2.777.000 | 16,1% |
| 090 | Héroes y ratones | 18 March 2009 | 3.081.000 | 18,7% |
| 091 | Fruta fresca | 25 March 2009 | 2.714.000 | 15,8% |
| 092 | Lolito | 1 April 2009 | 3.022.000 | 17,2% |

=== Season 8 ===
| No. | Title | Original Air | Audience | Share |
|---|---|---|---|---|
| 093 | La inteligencia de San Antonio | 15 April 2009 | 2.651.000 | 15,0% |
| 094 | La carcasa de mindundi | 29 April 2009 | 2.118.000 | 12,0% |
| 095 | La sopa atómica | 6 May 2009 | 2.561.000 | 14,8% |
| 096 | Las reglas de los Pacos | 20 May 2009 | 2.727.000 | 15,5% |
| 097 | Amores improbables | 28 May 2009 | 2.302.000 | 13,3% |
| 098 | El efecto mascletá | 3 June 2009 | 2.798.000 | 16,1% |
| 099 | Algo tan sencillo como hacerte feliz | 10 June 2009 | 2.727.000 | 16,0% |
| 100 | Héroes | 17 June 2009 | 3.009.000 | 18,5% |
| 101 | Todo por lo legal | 24 June 2009 | 2.666.000 | 16,8% |
| 102 | Vengo con tres heridas | 1 July 2009 | 2.544.000 | 16,8% |
| 103 | Amor a bocajarro | 8 July 2009 | 2.488.000 | 16,9% |
| 104 | Todos los planes de Lucas Fernández | 15 July 2009 | 3.712.000 | 27.2% |

=== Season 9 ===
| No. | Title | Original Air | Audience | Share |
|---|---|---|---|---|
| 105 | Las triquiñuelas del mal | 17 February 2010 | 2.624.000 | 15,9% |
| 106 | Dos horitas tontas | 24 February 2010 | 2.284.000 | 13,8% |
| 107 | Los planes de los muertos | 3 March 2010 | 2.168.000 | 13,4% |
| 108 | Los muertos no sangran | 10 March 2010 | 1.978.000 | 11,5% |
| 109 | Una llamadita inquietante | 17 March 2010 | 1.895.000 | 11,2% |
| 110 | Una noche espeluznante | 24 March 2010 | 1.878.000 | 11,9% |
| 111 | Conexión y agua bendita | 7 April 2010 | 1.752.000 | 10,2% |
| 112 | El ABC del satanismo | 14 April 2010 | 1.740.000 | 9,9% |
| 113 | Novicia a la fuga | 21 April 2010 | 1.558.000 | 10,6% |
| 114 | El fumadero del Sr. Chang | 28 April 2010 | 1.487.000 | 8,6% |
| 115 | Ojito avizor | 5 May 2010 | 1.200.000 | 8,3% |
| 116 | Patadón y parriba | 12 May 2010 | 1.395.000 | 9,8% |
| 117 | El Acabose de los Tiempos | 19 May 2010 | 1.788.000 | 13,2% |

=== Season 10 ===
| No. | Title | Original Air | Audience | Share |
|---|---|---|---|---|
| 118 | Perder la cabeza | 10 May 2021 | 2,691,000 | 19.5% |
| 119 | La momia | 9 September 2021 | 1,263,000 | 12.0% |
| 120 | La carne en el asador | 16 September 2021 | 1,039,000 | 9,4% |
| 121 | Reina por un día | 23 September 2021 | 939,000 | 7,6% |
| 122 | ¡Sieg Heil! | 30 September 2021 | 877,000 | 7.6% |
| 123 | El reloj de cuco | 7 October 2021 | 841,000 | 7.3% |
| 124 | Romper España | 14 October 2021 | 810,000 | 7.7% |
| 125 | Air Force One | 21 October 2021 | 752,000 | 6.4% |
| 126 | Air Force Two | 28 October 2021 | 837,000 | 6.9% |
| 127 | I.A | 4 November 2021 | 453,000 | 6.2% |
| 128 | Todo lo bueno que me ocurra de hoy en adelante te lo deberé a ti | 11 November 2021 | 326,000 | 10.4% |
| 129 | La llorona | 18 November 2021 | 223,000 | 6.8% |
| 130 | El muro | 25 November 2021 | 176,000 | 5.7% |
| 131 | Que nada ni nadie rompa esta familia | 2 December 2021 | 91,000 | 4,6% |
| 132 | Entre espías | 9 December 2021 | 141,000 | 6.5% |
| 133 | Amigos para siempre | 16 December 2021 | 347,000 | 8.1% |

== Cast ==
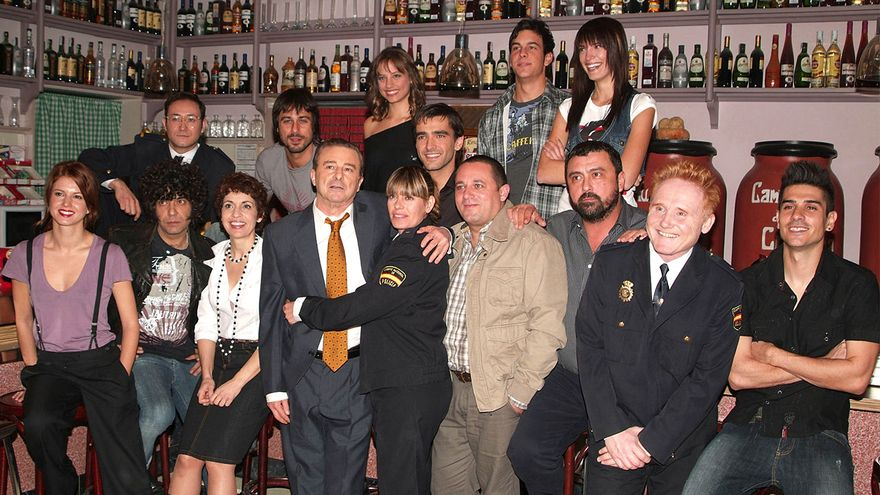
Cast of Los Hombres del Paco

- Paco Tous as Francisco "Paco" Miranda Ramos (2005–2010; 2021)
- Pepón Nieto as Mariano Moreno (2005–2010; 2021)
- Juan Diego as Don Lorenzo Castro Riquelme (2005–2010)
- Marián Aguilera as Silvia Castro León (2005–2010)
- Hugo Silva as Lucas Fernández (2005–2010; 2021)
- Michelle Jenner as Sara Miranda Castro (2005–2010; 2021)
- Cristina Plazas as Marina Salgado (2008–2010)
- Federico Celada as Curtis Naranjo (2005–2010)
- Carlos Santos as José Luis Povedilla Turriente (2005–2010; 2021)
- Neus Sanz as Margarita "Rita" Peláez (2005–2010; 2021)
- Mario Casas as Aitor Carrasco Menéndez (2007–2010; 2021)
- Aitor Luna as Gonzalo Montoya (2005–2009)
- Enrique Martínez as Enrique "Quique" Gallardo (2005–2009)
- Marcos Gracia as Daniel Andradas (2010)
- Adriana Ozores as Dolores "Lola" Castro León (2005–2009)
- Clara Lago as Carlota Fernández (2007–2008)
- Neus Asensi as Bernarda González (2005–2007)
- Alan Bond-Ballard as George (2009)
- Lucía Caraballo (2009)

Introduced in season 5

- Laura Sánchez as Pepa.
- Rubén Ochandiano as Enrique.
- Francesc Garrido as Portillo.
- Miguel de Lira as Félix.
- Miko Jarry as André Salazar.
- Xavier Lafitte as Philippe Mignon.
- Erica Prior as Alison Morris.

Introduced in season 7

- Jimmy Castro as Nelson.

Introduced in seasons 8 and 9

- Goya Toledo as inspectora Reyes.
- Benjamín Vicuña as Deker.
- Marcos García as Dani.
- Patricia Montero as Lis.
- Alex Hernández as Goyo.
- Ángela Cremonte as Amaya.
- Asier Etxeandía as Blackman.

Introduced in seasons 10 and 11

- Amparo Larrañaga as Dolores Urbizu.
- Amaia Sagasti as Ika.
- Juan Grandinetti as Rober.

== Development, production and release ==
Aired on Antena 3, the original broadcasting run of the first 9 seasons spanned from 9 October 2005 to 19 May 2010.

The series was also broadcast in Argentina, Bulgaria, Czech Republic, Poland, Hungary, Morocco, Romania, Serbia, Italy, Slovakia and Turkey.

Return

On 22 April 2020 it was announced that Atresmedia was preparing a return of the series after a decade-long hiatus and that filming would begin in the summer of that same year if the COVID-19 crisis allowed it. The return of Paco Tous, Pepón Nieto, Carlos Santos and Neus Sanz was reported. On 24 June 2020, actors Hugo Silva and Michelle Jenner announced that they would return to the series in their respective roles. New additions to the cast included Amparo Larrañaga, Amaia Sagasti and Juan Grandinetti.

The new episodes were produced by Atresmedia TV in collaboration with Globomedia (The Mediapro Studio). Montse García, Marc Cistaré and Javier Pons were credited as executive producers. Direction was tasked to Alejandro Bazzano, Sandra Gallego Christensen, Víctor García León, David Molina, Marc Vigil, Jesús Rodrigo, Marc Cistaré, Jacob Santana and Tom Fernández.

Season 10 premiered on Antena 3 on 10 May 2021, with subsequent episodes slated for an exclusive original release on Atresplayer Premium. The episode earned 2,691,000 viewers and a 19.5% audience share.

| Country | Title | Title translation | Channel |
|---|---|---|---|
| Argentina | Los hombres de Paco | Paco's Men | Canal 7 |
| Czech Republic | Pacovo muzstvo | Paco's Men | AXN |
| Hungary | Balfék körzet | Twit Division | AXN |
| Italy | Los hombres de Paco | Paco's Men | Canale 5 |
| Romania | Oamenii lui Paco | Paco's Men | AXN |
| Bulgaria | Хората на Пако | Paco's Men | AXN |
| Serbia | Паков свет / Pakov svet | Paco's World | Studio B |
| Slovakia | Pacovi muži | Paco's Men | AXN |
| Spain | Los hombres de Paco | Paco's Men | Antena 3 |
| Turkey | Şaşkın Polisler | Silly Cops | Olay TV |
| Poland | Paco i jego ludzie | Paco and his men | AXN |
| Bosnia and Herzegovina | Pakov svijet | Paco's World | RTRS |
| Morocco | باكو | Paco | 2M |

== Awards and nominations ==
| Year | Award | Category | Nominee(s) | Result | Ref. |
|---|---|---|---|---|---|
| 2007 | 9th ATV Awards | Best Actress in a TV Series | Adriana Ozores | Nominated | |
| 2007 | 57th Fotogramas de Plata | Best Television Actor | Hugo Silva | Nominated | |
| 2007 | 16th Actors Union Awards | Television: Lead Performance, Male | Paco Tous | Nominated | |
| 2008 | Zapping Awards | Best Actress | Adriana Ozores | Won | |
| 2009 | 18th Actors Union Awards | Television: Minor Performance, Male | Carlos Santos | Nominated | |
| 2010 | 60th Fotogramas de Plata | Best Television Actor | Juan Diego | Won | |
| 2010 | 60th Fotogramas de Plata | Best Television Actress | Marián Aguilera | Nominated | |
