= Marián Aguilera =

Spanish actress

Marian Aguilera
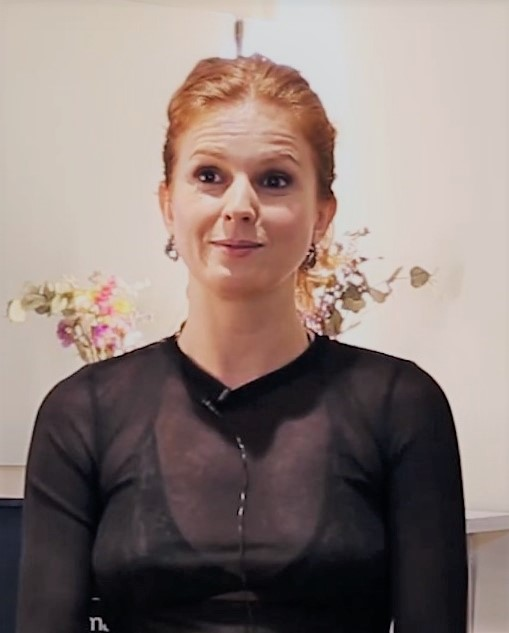
- Born: Marián Aguilera Pérez; 12 March 1977 (age 49); Montgat, Barcelona, Spain
- Occupation: Actress
- Years active: 1989–present

Marián Aguilera Pérez (born 12 March 1977 in Montgat, Barcelona, Spain) is a Spanish film and television actress.

== Biography ==
Her image was telecast for the World to see when she carried the Olympic flame at Empúries for the Barcelona Olympic Games (1992), upon its arrival from Greece. She was 15.

The first film which she starred in was El Largo Invierno (1992), at the hands of Jaime Camino. Other highlights of her earlier film titles are La Ciudad de los Prodigios (1999), Quin Curs, el Meu Tercer! (1994) (TV) and Tuno Negro (2001).

But she is most remembered as Miriam when she starred in Al salir de clase (1997–1999), a TV series about the lives of a group of teenagers in Madrid. After the series ended, she starred in less successful Esencia de Poder (2001–2002) and Código Fuego (2003).

Los Hombres de Paco / Paco's Men (2005–2009) catapulted her into international stardom and fame, with her character Silvia Castro Leon. It created a new fan-base, and countless forums and websites (in many languages) dedicated to her character Silvia and the love story between Silvia and Pepa (portrayed by Laura Sánchez). However, to great dismay of the series and her character's fans, Marián Aguilera left the show in 2009 to allow herself to grow and explore other possibilities. She re-appeared in the series' final season a few times as an illusion/imagination (or perhaps a ghost) to Paco.

For her performance in Los Hombres de Paco, she was nominated Best TV Actress at the 60th Fotogramas de Plata in 2009.

== Filmography ==
=== Filmography ===
Year	Movie/TV Series
2011	El Último Fin de Semana
2010	Lo Más Importante de la Vida es no Haber Muerto
2008	Un Poco de Chocolate / Un Tranvía en SP
2007	El prado de las estrellas (The Field of Stars)
2007	Marqués Mendigo (TV)
2004	Las Huellas que Devuelve el Mar / Huellas Perdidas
2004	Tánger
2004	Seres Queridos / Only Human
2003	El Misterio de Wells / The Reckoning
2003	Instinto-demium (TV)
2002	No Debes estar Aquí
2001	Morality Play
2001	Honolulu Baby
2001	Tuno Negro
2000	Besos de tinta
1999	La Ciudad de los Prodigios
1997	Tic Tac
1994	Quin Curs el Meu Tercer! (TV)
1991	El Largo Invierno

=== Short films ===
- ¿Quién es Libertad Lionetti? (2015)
- La Ultima Funcion (2007)
- Válido Para un Baile (2006)
- Otra Vida (2005)
- Mucha Mierda (1999)

=== Television/Miniseries (Regular) ===
- Homicidios (2011)
- Los hombres de Paco (2005–2010)
- El Inquilino (2004)
- Código fuego (2003)
- Esencia de Poder (2001–2002)
- Laberint d'ombres (1999–2000)
- Al salir de clase (1997–1999)
- El Hijo de Sandokan (1998)
