= Laura Sánchez =

Laura Sánchez may refer to:

- Laura Sánchez (diver) (born 1985), Mexican diver
- Laura Sánchez (swimmer) (born 1972), Mexican swimmer
- Laura Sánchez (model) (born 1981), Spanish model and actress
