= The City of Marvels (film) =

- Theatrical release poster
- Spanish: La ciudad de los prodigios
- Directed by: Mario Camus
- Screenplay by: Mario Camus; Gustau Hernández; Esther Cases; Olivier Ollin
- Based on: The City of Marvels by Eduardo Mendoza
- Produced by: J.A. González i Serret
- Starring: Olivier Martinez; Emma Suárez; François Marthouret
- Cinematography: Acácio de Almeida
- Edited by: José María Biurrun
- Music by: Jean-Marie Sénia
- Distributed by: Filmax
- Release date: 28 May 1999 (Spain)
- Countries: Spain; France; Portugal
- Language: Spanish

The City of Marvels (Spanish: La ciudad de los prodigios) is a 1999 epic historical drama film directed by Mario Camus and co-written by Gustau Hernández, Esther Cases, and Olivier Ollin based on the novel The City of Marvels by Eduardo Mendoza. It stars Olivier Martinez and Emma Suárez.

== Plot ==
Set in early 20th-century Barcelona, in the period in between the 1888 and 1929 Expos, the plot tracks the social climbing of ambitious Onofre Bouvila.

== Cast ==
- Olivier Martinez as Onofre Bouvila
- Emma Suárez as Delfina
- François Marthouret as Braulio
- Joaquín Díaz as Humbert Figa
- Héctor Colomé as Alexandre Canals
- Francesc Garrido as Joan Sicart
- José María Sanz Beltrán "Loquillo" as Efrén Castells
- Ramón Langa as Marqués de Ut
- Marián Aguilera as Margarita
- Tony Ysbert as Odón Mostaza
- Amparo Moreno as Diana
- Lluís Homar as padre de Onofre ('Onofre's father')
- Diego Doria as Beltail
- Montserrat Carulla as Micaela Castro

== Production ==
The film is a Spanish-French-Portuguese co-production of ICC with Tanaïs COM, France 3 Cinéma, SEP Cinéma, Continental Filmes, and RTP.

== Release ==
Distribute by Filmax, the film was released theatrically in Spain on 28 May 1999.

== Reception ==
Jonathan Holland of Variety lamented that, excellent production values notwithstanding, the big-budget Euro epic "lacks the subtlety of the original novel and rarely rises above the proficient, hampered by too many flat characters, too many events, too many minutes and an almost humor-free, too-many-cooks script".

== Accolades ==
Year	Award	Category	Nominee(s)	Result	Ref.
2000	14th Goya Awards	Best Special Effects	Reyes Abades, Hipólito Cantero, José María Aragonés	Nominated	

== See also ==
- List of Spanish films of 1999
