= Locked Up season 1 =

Locked Up
- Season 1
- Promotional poster
- Starring: Maggie Civantos; Najwa Nimri; Carlos Hipólito; Roberto Enríquez; Berta Vázquez; Alba Flores; Cristina Plazas; Inma Cuevas; María Isabel Díaz Lago; María Salgueiro; Ramiro Blas|María Salgueiro; Marta Aledo; Laura Barniea; Daniel Ortiz; Alberto Velasco; Harlys Becerra
- No. of episodes: 11

Release
- Original network: Antena 3
- Original release: April 20 – July 2, 2015

Season chronology
- Next → Season 2

The first season of the Spanish crime drama television series Vis a Vis originally aired on Antena 3 in Spain. It consists of 11 episodes. The pilot episode was broadcast on April 20, 2015; the first five episodes aired on Mondays at 10 pm and the final six aired on Thursdays at the same timeslot. The season was executive produced by Globomedia.

The season focuses on the events in the fictional women's prison Cruz del Sur and outside of the prison. Macarena (Maggie Civantos) is sent to prison for financial crimes, awaiting trial. Her life is turned upside down when she experiences her new reality and encounters the inmates Zulema (Najwa Nimri), Saray (Alba Flores), Rizos (Berta Vázquez), Soledad (María Isabel Díaz Lago), Anabel (Inma Cuevas), Tere (Marta Aledo), Antonia (Laura Baena), as well as prison employees Fabio (Roberto Enríquez), Dr. Sandoval (Ramiro Blas), Miranda (Cristina Plazas), Palacios (Alberto Velasco) and Valbuena (Harlys Becerra). Her family searches for a large sum of money hidden somewhere to pay her bail.

The season received several accolades, including the main female cast sharing the Ondas Awards for Best Actress, six nominations and two wins at the Spanish Actors Union Awards, four nominations from the Iris Awards, a Fotogramas de Plata nomination, and a FesTVal award.

== Cast and characters ==
=== Cruz Del Sur inmates ===
- Maggie Civantos as Macarena Ferreiro
- Najwa Nimri as Zulema Zahir
- Berta Vázquez as Estefania "Rizos" Kabila
- Alba Flores as Saray Vargas de Jesús
- Inma Cuevas as Ana Belén "Anabel" Villaroch Garcés
- María Isabel Díaz Lago as Soledad "Sole" Núñez Hurtado
- Marta Aledo as Teresa "Tere" González Largo
- Laura Baena as Antonia Trujillo Díez

=== Cruz del Sur employees ===
- Roberto Enríquez as Fabio Martínez León
- Ramiro Blas as Carlos Sandoval Castro
- Cristina Plazas as Miranda Aguirre Senén
- Alberto Velasco as Antonio Palacios Lloret
- Harlys Becerra as Ismael Valbuena Ugarte

=== Macarena's family ===
- Carlos Hipólito as Leopoldo Ferreiro Lobo
- María Salgueiro as Encarna Molina
- Daniel Ortiz as Román Ferreiro Molina

=== Police ===
- Jesús Castejón as Inspector Damián Castillo

=== Recurring and guest ===
- Belén Cuesta as Yolanda Montero
- Adryen Mehdi as Hanbal "The Egyptian" Hamadi
- Dunia Rodríguez as María Prieto "Casper" Téllez
- Sonia Almarcha as Lidia Osborne
- Irene Arcos as Carolina
- Carmen Baquero as Alba Vargas de Jesús
- Paula Medina as Jacky
- Ana Labordeta as Paloma Garrido "Governor"
- Juan Blanco as Alfonso "El Piti"

== Episodes ==
No. overall	No. in season	Title	English title	Directed by	Original release date	Viewers (millions)
1	1	"Un mal día"	"Dead Mosquito"	Jesús Colmenar	April 20, 2015	4.3 (22.4%)
Macarena Ferrero (Maggie Civantos) is preparing to submit herself to prison after she was sentenced to seven years with a high bail in prison for fraud. She first meets Rizos (Berta Vázquez) a bubbly inmate assigned in the reception area. First assigned to a cell with Zulema (Najwa Nimri) the most dangerous inmate and her loyal friend, Saray (Alba Flores).However, Zulema refused to have her in her cell, showing off instantly her control over the prison. Macarena is moved to another cell with Soledad (María Isabel Díaz Lago), Anabel (Inma Cuevas) and Yolanda (Belén Cuesta). With only a day in prison, she witnessed Yolanda getting out of their cell with Zulema; Yolanda would turn up dead in the morning. There were only two witnesses, Paloma (Ana Labordeta) the prison governor, who was Zulema's accomplice and Macarena herself. Meanwhile, Macarena was forced to smuggle drugs for Anabel when she failed to pay Anabel the favor she asked.
2	2	"Cosiendo a campanilla"	"Sewing Tinkerbell"	Jesús Rodrigo	April 27, 2015	4.0 (21.4%)
On the onset of Yolanda's murder investigation, Inspector Castillo (Jesús Castejón) concluded that the person who murdered Yolanda was after the huge amount of stolen money she hid before she was incarcerated. Macarena finally revealed to her parents about the truth and upon learning, Leopoldo (Carlos Hipólito) confronted Simon, Macarena's lover boss. As a witness, Sole and Rizos warned Macarena to keep her mouth shut and to not make herself an enemy of the most dangerous inmate, as Saray, who's already after her for stealing her girlfriend. Instead Macarena threatened Zulema that she will rat her out to the police whereas Paloma vowed to Zulema to keep her mouth shut. Zulema asked her Egyptian boyfriend, Hanbal (Adryen Mehdi), to eliminate one of the two loose ends of Yolanda's murder.
3	3	"Lo que sucede, conviene"	"Everything Happens for a Reason"	Sandra Gallego	May 4, 2015	3.8 (20.9%)
Macarena ratted Zulema out to the Prison Director, Miranda (Cristina Plazas), that she was with Yolanda the night she was killed. Her decisions lead to dire consequences especially to her family with the looming threat of Hanbal. Sole who got hold of the simcard containing the location of the money made Macarena choose, to get rid of the simcard or to keep it. Disappointed with Macarena's decision to keep it, warned her that she's entering into a dangerous territory she can't escape. Anabel would later steal the simcard from her and sold it to Saray. Meanwhile, Dr. Sandoval (Ramiro Blas) continues his previous acts towards Macarena. She also learned that she's pregnant with Simon's child. Desperate more than ever, she reached an agreement with Saray, retract her statement against Zulema and to stay away from Rizos which she all did to get the simcard back.
4	4	"Un día de campo"	"A Day in the Country"	David Molina Encinas	May 11, 2015	3.9 (21.2%)
Inspector Castillo enlisted Rizos' help to prove that Macarena knew about the location of the money in exchange for an early day release. Zulema offered Macarena a proposition that they share the money so that no one gets hurt in the process. Meanwhile, Valbuena (Harlys Becerra), a prison guard, with Tere's (Marta Aledo) help planted drugs on Zulema'a cart to anger Anabel so that they can eliminate each other. Rizos gate crashed Sandoval's therapy session with the inmates where she and Saray made peace as they shared a hug after Saray serenaded her. Upon getting proof, Castillo with Fabio (Roberto Enríquez) and Macarena searched the area where the money was hidden but was surprised to see Hanbal instead, resulting to a gun battle, killing Castillo's partner while injuring Castillo and Fabio with Macarena frozen in shock.
5	5	"La cruda realidad"	"Harsh Reality"	Jesús Colmenar	May 18, 2015	3.9 (21.1%)
Flashforward to ten days, Macarena is still having flashbacks on the bloody day in the forest; With Fabio and Castillo badly injured, she was on her own with the threat of the Egyptian still looming around. Meanwhile, Saray's family came to visit her to announce that she is getting married much to her dismay. Zulema would then reveal to her parents, that Saray is lesbian, who can't marry a man, a free woman who choose who she loves, however, Saray agreed to get married when her mother (Carmen Baquero) threatened to disown her, much to Zulema's disappointment. Zulema who is getting frustrated by Hanbal's lack of communication, confronts Macarena to what actually transpired in the forest. Macarena only revealed to her that Hanbal sent a message for her, a passage, angering Zulema even more, as to why it took her long to relay the message. Zulema threatened to harm Macarena's child the next time. At the end, Macarena threatened Zulema that she actually shot her boyfriend in the forest, that she's capable of such act and to never threaten her child again.
6	6	"Te vendrán a buscar..."	"They'll Come for You"	Jesús Rodrigo	May 28, 2015	3.2 (17.9%)
Macarena resigned to her fate that she's going to stay in prison, Leopoldo and Roman (Daniel Ortiz) took matters into their own hands and went after Hanbal to steal the money. And to prove that Zulema is serious with her friendship with Macarena, she sent Casper to be her servant while secretly spying on her. Meanwhile, Saray got married in prison, with Rizos by her side much to the disgust of her mother. Anabel continues to physically terrorize Macarena to pay her growing debt. Miranda assigned Palacio's (Alberto Velasco) for a sudden locker inspection where he discovered that Valbuena is using drugs and might be dealing with the inmates. Sandoval continues his sexual advances to Macarena in return for favors making Macarena's life even more difficult.
7	7	"A las cinco en punto de la tarde"	"5 on the Dot"	Sandra Gallego	June 4, 2015	3.0 (17.7%)
Zulema mapped out an escape plan by hurting herself she was able to get out of prison. But Zulema and Hanbal's plan was foiled when Leopoldo and Roman decrypted the passage. They successfully located Hanbal and took him as hostage. Macarena finally had a proof on how to prove her relationship with Simon but she needs Sandoval's authorization to have it and it comes with a high price. Macarena is getting closer to Fabio, where they shared a kiss in the chapel while also making out every now and then with Rizos. Macarena after learning she got HPV which can only be transmitted thru sex felt violated since she and Rizos never went all the way. She confronted Rizos and got into a heated argument, with Rizos telling Macarena she's tired of her indecisiveness.
8	8	"Pretty Woman"	"Pretty Woman"	David Molina Encinas	June 11, 2015	3.5 (20.9%)
Leopoldo had a stroke after taking out Hanbal while Roman accidentally shot him in the leg after he tried to escape. After spending much time with Rizos', Macarena is getting confused with her feelings for her. Saray confronted Macarena after believing that she and Rizos had sex when Macarena assured her that she is straight. This led to a fight resulting to a broken TV disrupting the inmates' movie night. The two were forced to settle their differences by working together. Saray then warned Macarena to get a replacement since the inmates took their movie nights seriously and would harm anyone who gets on their way. Meanwhile Zulema is frustrated by her failed plan. Failing to replace the television, led by Antonia (Laura Baena) the inmates beat her up.
9	9	"Negra, negrita, negrata"	"Quid pro quo"	Jesús Colmenar	June 18, 2015	3.0 (17.7%)
With Zulema's plans failing and knowing that Macarena's family was behind it, she took Macarena hostage as a bargain for Hanbal, who Leopoldo and Roman had held hostage in their house. She secretly put an abortion pill on Macarena's milk. Zulema together with Saray stormed Macarena's cell and held her hostage with Palacios when he tried to interfere. The situation escalated into danger zone when Zulema brought a gun out, shooting the prison guards. Negotiations went out when Leopoldo refused to free Hanbal and tortured him instead, angering Zulema even more. Zulema threatened them that if this continues a bit longer, Macarena will lose her child since she put an abortion pill in her milk, shocking everyone, even Saray who did not know about the pill. Leopoldo turned to Castillo's help, incriminating himself by declaring that he has the Egyptian and to help her daughter. Macarena lost her child afterwards, Saray, who did not approve of Zulema's act, frees Macarena and was about to strangle Zulema only beaten by police shooting at them. Meanwhile, Encarna (María Salgueiro), Macarena's mother discovered that her husband and son is keeping a hostage in their garage, after learning the truth, she tried to suffocate Hanbal by placing a plastic bag on this head.
10	10	"Gato gris"	"Grey Cat"	Jesús Rodrigo	June 25, 2015	2.9 (17.8%)
After losing her child and the torture she went through the moment she set foot in prison, it was all too much for Macarena to handle. She started having hallucinations about a cat roaming around the prison premises. Miranda believed that Macarena might be having mental illness recommends to put her into a psychiatric prison. Meanwhile, Saray confronts Zulema why she didn't tell her about her plan to abort Macarena's child, if she did she would never have helped her since she believes that children are sacred. Saray getting frustrated with Zulema, ends their friendship, while Zulema took out her anger by scratching Saray's face, permanently leaving a scar. Roman and Leopoldo found the money and tried to deal with Hanbal. When Fabio caught Sandoval in act about to molest Macarena, he beat him up and warned him. Meanwhile, Macarena finally agreed to be Rizos' girlfriend. Hanbal got his revenge by running over Roman's daughter.
11	11	"El principio de las tortugas"	"The Turtle Principle"	Sandra Gallego	July 2, 2015	3.1 (19.4%)
Sole got a heart donor and was brought to a hospital for a transplant. Fabio is missing and all the prison employees were worried about his whereabouts. Zulema divulged Hanbal's location to Leopoldo and Roman, who was seeking revenge for what happened to his daughter, in exchange for the money. Macarena got a chance to testify against Simon and was scheduled for a hearing. The Ferreiros found Hanbal and took him. Roman tried to bury him alive but Leopoldo saved him from becoming a murderer, he then shot Hanbal point blank. Macarena was about to testify when she witnessed Zulema and two other inmates trying to escape to a hole they dug in the laundry area, Zulema who just laughs at Macarena's bad luck She was about to escape when Saray came and stopped her; To shut her up and to not cause commotion, they brought her along into their escape, making her a fugitive.

== Awards and nominations ==
Year	Award	Category	Nominees	Result	Ref.
2015	Ondas Awards	Best Actress	Female Cast of Vis a Vis	Won	
2015	FesTVal de Televisión y Radio de Vitoria	Discovery of the Year	Vis a vis	Won	
2015	Premios MiM	Best Drama Actress for Television	Maggie Civantos	Won	
2016	Spanish Actors Union Awards	Best Female Lead Performance	Maggie Civantos	Won	
2016	Spanish Actors Union Awards	Best Female Lead Performance	Najwa Nimri	Nominated	
2016	Spanish Actors Union Awards	Best Male Lead Performance	Roberto Enríquez	Nominated	
2016	Spanish Actors Union Awards	Best Female Performance in Supporting Role	Alba Flores	Nominated	
2016	Spanish Actors Union Awards	Best Female Performance in Minor Role	Inma Cuevas	Won	
2016	Spanish Actors Union Awards	Best Female Performance in Minor Role	Marta Aledo	Nominated	
2016	Iris Awards	Best Actress	Najwa Nimri	Nominated	
2016	Iris Awards	Best Actor	Carlos Hipólito	Nominated	
2016	Iris Awards	Best Fiction	Vis a vis	Nominated	
2016	Iris Awards	Best Production	Cristina López Ferrar, Juan López Olivar	Nominated	
2016	Fotogramas de Plata	Audience Award for Best Spanish Series	Vis a vis	Nominated	
2016	Festival de Luchon (France)	Best Spanish Fiction	Vis a vis	Won	
2016	Premios Paramount Channel	Best Villain	Najwa Nimri	Won	
2016	Premios Paramount Channel	Best Upcoming Actress	Berta Vázquez	Won	
2016	Premios MiM	Best Drama Series	Vis a vis	Won	
2016	Premios MiM	Best Director	Vis a vis	Nominated	
