= Código fuego =

Spanish television series

- Genre: Thriller; Drama
- Created by: Víctor Mato; Juanjo Díaz Polo
- Directed by: Eva Lesmes; Miguel Ángel Díez
- Starring: José Coronado; Maribel Verdú; Pedro Alonso; Pepo Oliva; Marián Aguilera; Antonio de la Torre; Cuca Escribano; Ramón Langa; Juan Sanz; Penélope Velasco; Emilio Buale; Mabel Lozano
- Country of origin: Spain
- Original language: Spanish
- No. of seasons: 1
- No. of episodes: 8 (2 left unaired in the original linear run)

Production
- Production company: Cartel

Original release
- Network: Antena 3
- Release: 15 January 2003

Código fuego (lit. 'Code Fire') is a Spanish thriller drama television series created by Víctor Mato and Juanjo Díaz Polo that originally aired on Antena 3 in 2003. Produced by Cartel, its cast, led by José Coronado and Maribel Verdú, also featured the likes of Pedro Alonso, Pepo Oliva, Marián Aguilera, Antonio de la Torre, Cuca Escribano and Ramón Langa, among others. After a good performance of the pilot episode, the series' viewership ratings abruptly decreased to the point the series was cancelled with 2 episodes left unaired in the original run.

== Premise ==
The plot tracks the personal and professional developments of a group of firefighters working at the 'Parque de Bomberos número 16'.

== Cast ==
- José Coronado as Alberto Quintana.
- Maribel Verdú as Elena Valdés.
- Pedro Alonso as Toni.
- Pepo Oliva as Enrique.
- Marián Aguilera as Sandra.
- Antonio de la Torre
- Cuca Escribano
- Ramón Langa as Pablo Ortega.
- Juan Sanz as Fon.
- Penélope Velasco
- Emilio Buale as Sergio.
- Mabel Lozano as Marga.
- Gorka Zubelda as Luis.
- Lula Legorburu as Marina.
- Andreas Muñoz as Chipi.

== Production and release ==
Código fuego was created by Víctor Mato and Juanjo Díaz Polo and was produced by Cartel for Antena 3. Directed by Eva Lesmes and Miguel Ángel Díez, the series began filming in December 2002. It premiered on 15 January 2003, earning a 24.8% audience share. It was axed out by Antena 3 after the 6th episode, broadcast on 26 February (which earned a 14.1% share), reportedly because it "had not met the network's audience expectations", leaving 2 unaired episodes. The series proved to be one of the biggest blunders of the television season.
