= Only Human (2004 film) =

Only Human (Seres queridos)
- Directed by: Teresa De Pelegrí; Dominic Harari
- Written by: Teresa De Pelegrí; Dominic Harari
- Starring: Guillermo Toledo; Marián Aguilera; Norma Aleandro
- Music by: Charlie Mole
- Distributed by: Canal+ Spain
- Release dates: 9 July 2004 (Spain); 26 May 2005 (Argentina)
- Running time: 93 minutes
- Countries: Spain; Argentina; Portugal; United Kingdom
- Languages: Spanish; Hebrew; Arabic; English

Only Human (original Spanish title: Seres queridos, "The Loved Ones") is a 2004 Spanish-Argentine film directed by Dominic Harari and Teresa De Pelegrí. The film premiered at Locarno's Piazza Grande during the 2004 Locarno Film Festival. A notable element of the plot is the love relation between a Jewish woman and a Palestinian man.

== Plot ==
Leni (Marian Aguilera) is a television reporter hailing from a Jewish family in Spain. During one weekend, Leni pays a visit to her family's residence, accompanied by her new boyfriend, college professor Rafi (Guillermo Toledo). Rafi is feeling rather anxious about meeting Leni's family, which includes her perpetually nervous mother, Gloria (Norma Aleandro); her boisterous father, Ernesto (Mario Martin); her sister, Tania, who is studying dance (María Botto); her conservative brother, David (Fernando Ramallo); and her forgetful grandfather, Dudu (Max Berliner).

However, Leni inadvertently complicates matters when she casually reveals to her family, who are eagerly awaiting Ernesto's return from work, that Rafi happens to be Palestinian. Tensions begin to rise further when Rafi playfully drops a frozen soup block from their high-rise window while joking with Tania's young daughter, accidentally striking a man on the head who may just be Ernesto.

In a panic, Leni and Rafi rush outside to call an ambulance but eventually return indoors as Leni fears that such a scandal could harm her career. As the situation escalates, Rafi realizes the gravity of the situation when he sees Tania's daughter's drawing of Ernesto. With tension mounting, the entire family becomes increasingly animated. The climax arrives when Leni discloses Tania's suspicion that their father may be cheating on their mother.

At this critical juncture, Rafi finally manages to confess to Leni that he suspects the injured man was actually her father. Gloria, Tania, Rafi, and Leni rush out of the building to Ernesto's workplace, all the while hoping they are wrong. Unbeknownst to them, Ernesto was not actually deceased and regains consciousness with some memory loss. He mistakenly believes a prostitute is his wife, who promptly kicks him out upon realizing he has no money. Ernesto aimlessly wanders the streets.

Meanwhile, the family arrives at his office only to encounter another bald man involved in an affair who informs them that Ernesto has already left. While Tania and Rafi wait for Leni and Gloria, who are engrossed in a heart-to-heart mother-daughter conversation, Tania attempts to seduce Rafi with a dance to a familiar tune. She kisses him, but he rebuffs her advances.

Upon their return, Leni is convinced that Tania and Rafi slept together, leading Tania to shed her apparent indifference towards the family. Eventually, everyone departs from the office reconciled. Upon returning home, Ernesto is brought back by a woman on a scooter who found him wandering the streets, reuniting the family once more.

== Cast ==
- Guillermo Toledo as Rafi
- Marián Aguilera as Leni Dali
- María Botto as Tania Dali
- Fernando Ramallo as David Dalenski
- Norma Aleandro as Gloria Dali
- Alba Molinero as Paula Dali
- Max Berliner as Dudu Dali
- Mario Martín as Ernesto Dali

== Awards ==
The film was awarded at film festivals:

in 2005:

- Monte-Carlo Comedy Film Festival: Best Film; Best Screenplay.

in 2005:

- Alpe d'Huez International Comedy Film Festival: Grand Prix;
- Jerusalem Film Festival: Mayors' Award, Best Feature on The Jewish Experience;
- Jewish Motifs International Film Festival in Warsaw, Poland: Warsaw Phoenix (silver statuette) for the best feature film.

Nominations

- Goya Awards: Goya, Best Make-Up and Hairstyles (Mejor Maquillaje y/o Peluquería); 2005.

== See also ==
- Total Siyapaa, a 2014 Indian remake
