= Euskolegas =

Spanish television series

- Genre: Sitcom
- Directed by: Javier Vicuña
- Starring: Javier Antón; Iker Galartza; Nayra Navarro; Andoni Agirregomezkorta; Verónika Moral; Arantxa Aranguren; Laura de la Calle; Ramón Barea; Pedro Otaegi; Ramón Ibarra
- Country of origin: Spain
- Original language: Spanish
- No. of seasons: 2
- No. of episodes: 24

Production
- Production location: Basque Country
- Running time: 50 min
- Production company: Pausoka

Original release
- Network: ETB 2
- Release: 11 May – 14 December 2009

Related
- Vaya Semanita

Euskolegas is a Spanish sitcom television series. It aired on ETB 2, the second channel of Basque broadcaster EITB, from 11 May to 14 December 2009. It is a sequel to a recurring comedy sketch of the same name that had been part of Vaya Semanita.

== Premise and characters ==
Set in Bilbao, the series follows a group of flatmates consisting of Alejandro "Álex" Ufarte (Javier Antón) from San Sebastián, Gipuzkoa; Francisco "Patxi" Goikoetxea (Andoni Agirregomezkorta) from Bilbao, Biscay; Prudencio "Pruden" Fournier (Iker Galartza) from Vitoria-Gasteiz, Álava; and Leire Roncal (Laura de la Calle) from Caparroso, Navarre. Following the events from the sketches that aired as part of Vaya Semanita, the series starts with the wedding of Álex and Leire. The wedding is cancelled due to various difficulties, and the flatmates move to an apartment in the same building where Patxi's uncle Santi (Ramón Barea), aunt Begoña (Arantxa Aranguren) and cousin Estíbaliz (Verónika Moral) live. During his honeymoon cruise and while intoxicated, Álex marries Sara (Nayra Navarro), a waiter that works in the ship.

After losing her job, Sara rents a room in Begoña's flat. Shortly afterwards, Leire discovers Álex's marriage and leaves. The first season ends with Sara and Álex divorcing. However, they start dating by the time Leire returns, visibly pregnant. Initially, she thinks that the father is Rafa (Luis Larrodera), Álex's cousin. However, by the time she gives birth, Álex is determined to be the father.

A secondary plotline involves the divorce of Santi and Begoña, and her subsequent relationship with Juan Mari (Ramón Ibarra), a banker who is Estíbaliz's and Álex's boss.

== Production ==
Filming for the first season started in the summer of 2008. The second season started filming in July 2009.

The first season obtained high ratings, but they declined during the second, leading to the cancellation of the show. The administrator of the official blog of the series subsequently published an entry giving a summary of the cancelled third season.
