= No Word from Gurb =

1990 novel by Eduardo Mendoza

- Author: Eduardo Mendoza Garriga
- Original title: Sin noticias de Gurb
- Publication date: 1990

No Word from Gurb (original in Spanish Sin noticias de Gurb) was written by Spanish writer Eduardo Mendoza and published as a novel in 1990. However, it originally appeared in the Spanish national newspaper El País in regular installments.

The story is about an alien who is lost in Barcelona whilst in search of his friend Gurb. Through taking on the appearances of various people, including the famous Spanish singer Marta Sánchez, he explores the city observing human life. The book is in the style of a diary, so the reader is taken day by day along the same journey with the alien, as he discovers more and more about the human race.

== Narrative ==
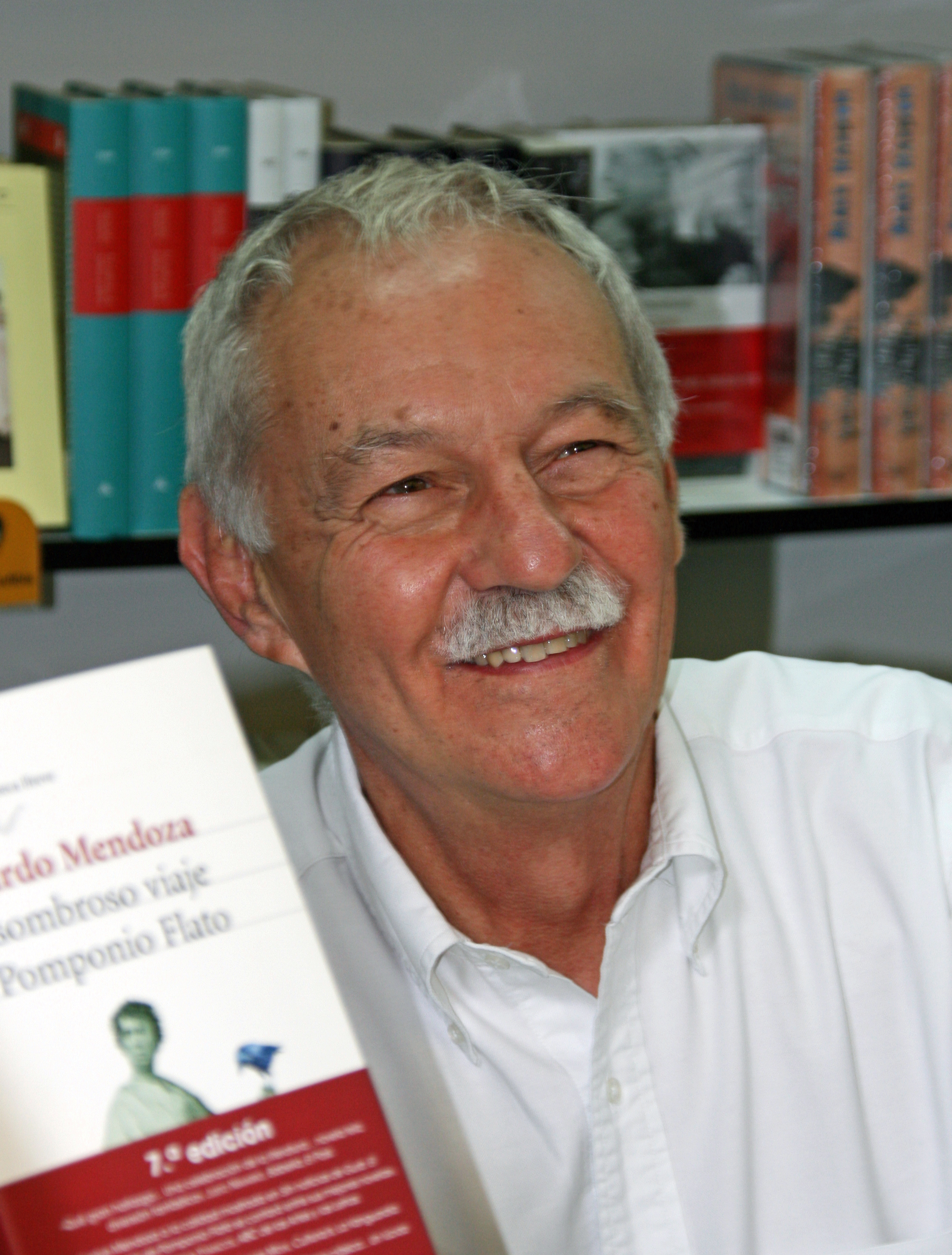
The author in 2008

The story begins with the narrator talking about his ideas and aims of travelling to Earth and adapting to the lifestyle there. Through writing this book, Mendoza captures an image of Barcelona as it is preparing for the Olympics in 1992. The atmosphere at that time, along with the chaos and absurdities of modern human life, are among the subjects that are focused on in this satirical novel. As a parody, "No Word from Gurb" depicts the day-to-day life of the city from the perspective of an alien. The author focuses in particular on portraying the urban lifestyle of humans; using Barcelona as a great example of a big city. Parody is a feature that is present throughout the book, an example of which is when the alien describes the composition of water as "hydrogen, oxygen and poo."

Throughout his search for his friend Gurb, the alien criticises the behaviour of human beings and realises that there are many differences between his culture and that of humans. For example, although he doesn't understand why, he notes that there are class divisions on Earth: there are rich and poor areas of Barcelona, like San Cosme and Pedralbes. Furthermore, he criticises the chaos regarding the upcoming Olympic Games at the time. In reality, there was a lot of public criticism due to the reported lack of organisation when planning and preparing for the international event. Mendoza again describes the disorganisation of the city as a parody.

Translations of the novel are available in English, French, German, Italian, Danish, Romanian, Polish, Esperanto and Bulgarian.

== Character Descriptions ==
- The narrator: is shy and doesn't like to attract attention, something which causes him difficulties when he transforms into famous people in an effort to fit into society on Earth.
- Gurb: is very different from his friend, the narrator. He is decisive, independent and is shown to have no concern for the narrator.
- The neighbour: is a young single mother. The main character is in love with her, although for the moment, she is not interested in him.
- Mr Joaquin and Mrs Mercedes: are the owners of the bar where the narrator often goes. They are a friendly and hard-working elderly couple who are suffering from health problems.
