= Ariadne Artiles =

Spanish model (born 1982)

- Artiles in 2016
- Born: Ariadne Artiles Cardeñosa; January 18, 1982 (age 44); Las Palmas, Canary Islands, Spain
- Occupation: Model
- Spouse: Fonsi Nieto (m. 2005; sep. 2008)
- Partner: José María García Fraile
- Children: 3

Ariadne Artiles Cardeñosa (born 18 January 1982) is a Spanish model. A finalist of the Elite Model Look contest at sixteen, she worked the American market early in her career, appearing in an Abercrombie & Fitch campaign photographed by Bruce Weber and modelling for Vogue, Marie Claire and Glamour, which named her its revelation model of 2006. She has since combined modelling with writing and business projects, among them two books on self-care and motherhood, and Pura Vida, a beachfront apartment complex she owns in the south of Gran Canaria.

== Early life ==
Artiles was born on 18 January 1982 in Las Palmas, in the Canary Islands, and was named after the Cretan princess of Greek mythology; a finalist of the Elite Model Look contest at sixteen, alongside Laura Sánchez, Priscila and Helen Lindes, she moved to Madrid to finish her studies, but set aside her plan to become a psychologist as modelling work came in.

== Modelling career ==
One of her first international jobs was an American Abercrombie & Fitch campaign photographed by Bruce Weber in Rome; on Weber's advice she moved to Miami, then one of the centres of the fashion business, and after three years there she settled in New York, keeping the American market as her main one in a career that has run for more than twenty years and has included work with Walter Chin for Vogue Italia and, around 2023, with Cindy Crawford on an Italian campaign.

In the United States she modelled for Vogue, Marie Claire and Glamour and appeared on covers for Elle, Harper's Bazaar, Cosmopolitan, Telva and InStyle; she walked for Roberto Cavalli, who later made her the face of some of his projects, and in 2006 Glamour chose her as its revelation model and GQ listed her among the most beautiful women in fashion.

Artiles has also worked as a designer: after a first collection for Yerse, she created a capsule collection for the Italian label Yamamay in 2015, three lines of swimwear and beachwear inspired by Gran Canaria, La Graciosa and Fuerteventura.

She has continued to model into her forties, and in June 2026 appeared as a guest of the Gisela show at Gran Canaria Swim Week.

== Writing and other projects ==
Artiles published her first book, Pura vida, a compendium of advice for a healthy life, and went into business with Pura Vida San Agustín, a beach-house hotel in Gran Canaria named in homage to the eight Canary Islands and to César Manrique.

Her second book, Pura vida madre (2022), deals with motherhood without idealisation, from pregnancy, birth and breastfeeding to child-rearing, and includes family recipes.

== Personal life ==
On 27 October 2005 Artiles married motorcycle racer Fonsi Nieto in Ibiza, in a ceremony held on a Thursday to fit the couple's work commitments. They announced their separation on 10 September 2008, in a joint statement describing the decision as mutual; by then Artiles had settled in New York.

Her partner is José María García Fraile, a son of the sports journalist José María García; their first daughter was born on 31 December 2017, and on returning to work after the birth Artiles defended breastfeeding breaks, arguing that breastfeeding should be a right for at least the baby's first six months. In November 2020, after spending eighteen days in bed with COVID-19 earlier that year, she announced that she was expecting identical twin girls. The arrival of the twins, María and Julieta, was announced in April 2021, after a pregnancy in which Artiles was prescribed bed rest for placenta previa; in 2017, the year her first daughter was born, she had launched La vida madre, an online community and blog about motherhood.
