= Jimmy Castro =

Spanish actor, born 1987

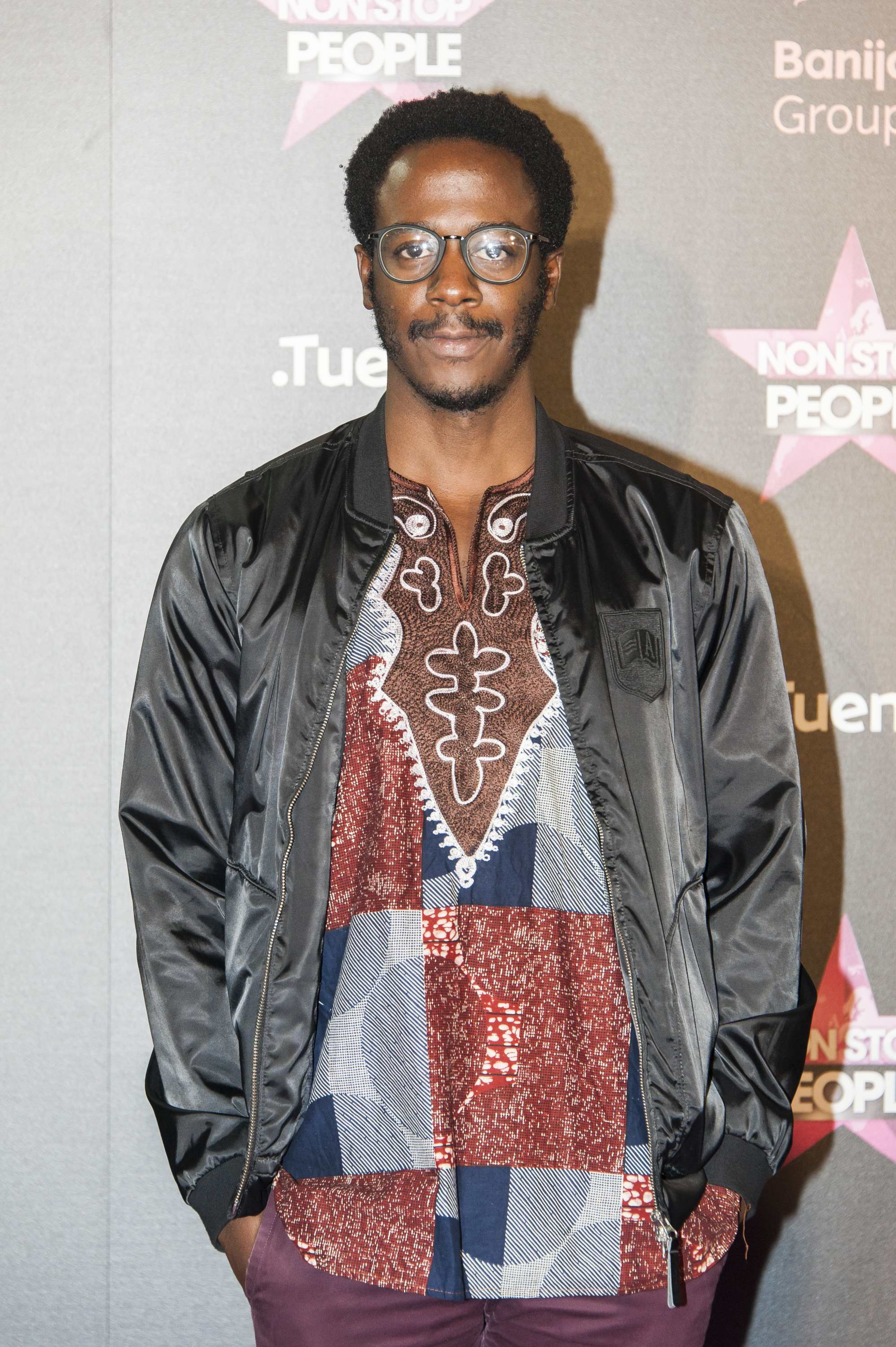
- Born: Jimmy Castro Vioque; 20 October 1987; Madrid, Spain
- Education: Autonomous University of Madrid
- Occupation(s): Actor, television presenter

Jaime Castro Vioque (born 20 October 1987) is a Spanish actor. He became popular in Spain in the 2000s as television presenter in Club Disney and Zona Disney.

== Biography ==
Born on 20 October 1987 and grew up in Madrid, he has Nigerian ancestry. While Castro had his television debut in 1995 with an appearance in Canguros, he earned recognition for his role as Hakim in the television series Hermanas, aired in 1998. Besides his training as an actor (at the Laboratorio de William Layton in Madrid and at The Bob McAndrew Acting Studio in New York), he also studied Philosophy at the Autonomous University of Madrid.

Castro earned popularity in Spain as presenter of the Club Disney show, which he joined in 2000. Castro hosted the show until 2007, when it has already been rebranded as Zona Disney. Years later, Castro would resume his activity as television presenter by co-hosting, together with Jimmy Barnatán, the Atresmedia show Los remakers. Besides his career in television, Castro, a member of the fourth promotion of the Joven Compañía Nacional de Teatro Clásico, has also a career as stage actor, performing in stage plays such as La dama boba or El banquete.

After performances in television series such as Divinos, Como el perro y el gato, Hospital Central and El comisario, Castro joined the cast of the 7th season of the Antena 3's popular series Los hombres de Paco (aired in 2009) to play Nelson, an unexperienced police officer. He also performed in the prison escape television series La fuga (aired on Telecinco in 2012); she played the role of Ander, one of the inmates. Afterwards, Castro landed a minor role in American period drama series Still Star-Crossed.

Since October 2020, he stars in the soap opera Servir y proteger in the role of Carlos Okoye, a good-hearted police inspector troubled by marriage issues.

== Filmography ==
Television

Year	Title	Role	Notes	Ref.
1998	Hermanas	Hakim	23 episodes	
2009	Los hombres de Paco	Nelson		
2012	La fuga	Ander		
2019	Allí abajo	Tomy		
2020–	Servir y proteger	Carlos Okoye		
2023	Un cuento perfecto (A Perfect Story)	Iván		

Film

Year	Title	Role	Notes	Ref.
2017	Smoking Club (129 normas)	Danny		
2019	El increíble finde menguante	Mark		
2019	Lo nunca visto	Calulu		
2020	Black Beach	Calisto		
