= Isla bonita =

- Theatrical release poster
- Directed by: Fernando Colomo
- Screenplay by: Fernando Colomo; Olivia Delcán; Miguel A. Furones
- Starring: Olivia Delcán; Fernando Colomo; Nuria Román; Miguel Ángel Furones; Lilian Caro; Tim Bettermann; Lluís Marqués
- Cinematography: Alfonso Sanz
- Edited by: María Lara
- Music by: Fernando Furones
- Production companies: Comba Films; La Perifèrica Produccions
- Distributed by: Surtsey Films
- Release dates: 21 September 2015 (Zinemaldia); 6 November 2015 (Spain)
- Country: Spain
- Languages: Spanish; English; Menorquin

Isla bonita (transl. The Pretty Island) is a 2015 Spanish drama film directed, co-written, and starred by Fernando Colomo. Its cast also features Olivia Delcán, Nuria Román, Miguel Ángel Furones, Lilian Caro, Tim Bettermann, and Lluís Marqués.

== Plot ==
Miguel Ángel invites his friend Fer (a run down publicist) to Menorca to spend some time there. Once in the island, Fer acquaints with sculptor Nuria and her daughter Olivia, who is caught in between her current boyfriend and her ex, a local man.

== Cast ==
- Olivia Delcán as Olivia
- Fernando Colomo as Fer
- Nuria Román as Nuria
- Miguel Ángel Furones as Miguel Ángel
- Lilian Caro
- Tim Bettermann
- Lluís Marqués

== Production ==
The screenplay was penned by Colomo together with Olivia Delcán and Miguel Ángel Furones. The film is a Comba Films and La Perifèrica Produccions production, and it had the support of the Illes Balears Film Commission. It was fully shot on location in the island of Menorca. It features dialogue in Spanish, English, and Menorquin, the Catalan dialect pertaining to the island.

== Release ==
The film world premiered out of competition in the 'Zabaltegi' section of the 63rd San Sebastián International Film Festival on 21 September 2015. Distributed by Surtsey Films, it was theatrically released in Spain on 6 November 2015.

== Reception ==
Pere Vall of Fotogramas rated Isla bonita 4 out of 5 stars, highlighting its pleasant freshness and the play of Delcán and her boyfriends, also pointing out that the film, while flirting with Woody Allen and François Truffaut, still feel very much Colomo's.

Andrea G. Bermejo of Cinemanía rated the "minimal" yet "authentic and fresh" production 3½ stars, highlighting Colomo's onscreen comicity in his own film, in between "Moretti and Woody Allen", and "more of a loser than Louis C.K.", as the film's standout.

Jordi Batlle Caminal of La Vanguardia deemed the film to be "balsamic, refreshing and airy, as well as spontaneous".

Rene Rodriguez of Miami Herald rated the film 3 out of 5 stars, observing that the non-professional cast of actors and their improvised dialogues bestow the comedy with "an uncommon intimacy and freshness", with an observational brand of humor.

== Accolades ==
Year	Award	Category	Nominee(s)	Result	Ref.
2016	30th Goya Awards	Best New Actor	Fernando Colomo	Nominated	
2016	60th Sant Jordi Awards	Best Spanish Film		Won	

== See also ==
- List of Spanish films of 2015
