= La fuga (TV series) =

Prison drama television series

- Genre: Prison drama; Thriller; Dystopian fiction
- Created by: Nacho Faerna
- Directed by: Antonio Hernández
- Starring: María Valverde; Aitor Luna; Asier Etxeandia; Benito Sagredo; Emilio Buale; Jennifer Rope; Jimmy Castro; Laura Domínguez; Laura Sánchez; Luis Iglesia; Manolo Martínez; María Vázquez; Marian Álvarez; Patxi Freytez
- Theme music composer: Nena Daconte
- Composer: Jeansy Aúz
- Country of origin: Spain
- Original language: Spanish
- No. of seasons: 1
- No. of episodes: 12

Production
- Production companies: Mediaset España; BocaBoca

Original release
- Network: Telecinco
- Release: 11 January – 4 April 2012

La fuga is a Spanish dystopian prison escape television series created by Nacho Faerna that originally aired on Telecinco from 11 January to 4 April 2012. It stars María Valverde and Aitor Luna.

== Plot ==
Set in a not distant figure, under which the governments have restricted liberties, a member of the resistance against the system, Daniel, is imprisoned for life into a high-security prison located on an oil platform. In order to get him out of the prison, his wife Anna becomes a prison officer and develops an extremely risky rescue plan.

== Cast ==
- María Valverde as Anna Serra.
- Aitor Luna as Daniel Ochoa.
- Asier Etxeandía, as Miguel Reverte.
- Benito Sagredo as Robe Gabia.
- Emilio Buale as Leo Alández.
- Jennifer Rope as Marla.
- Laura Domínguez as Greta.
- Jimmy Castro as Ander.
- Laura Sánchez as Dulce.
- Luis Iglesia as Enrique Grau.
- Manolo Martínez as Jorge Albo, "Tyson".
- Marian Álvarez, as Doctora Marta Romero.
- María Vázquez as Julia Molina, "Jota".
- Patxi Freytez as Álvaro Vidal.

== Production and release ==
Produced by Mediaset España in collaboration with BocaBoca, the filming of the series started in July 2011 under the provisional title '2055'. The shooting location reportedly was a 3,000 m^{2} set in San Sebastián de los Reyes. The first episode premiered on 11 January 2012 on Telecinco. Directed by Antonio Hernández, the series comprised twelve 70-minute long episodes.

Jeansy Aúz authored the score. The series' main theme "Pero si tú no estás", was written and performed by Nena Daconte.

After a "promising" 16.9% share of audience in the first episode (overcoming its Wednesday rival Downton Abbey), the number of viewers deflated gradually down to a minimum of 8.5% in the penultimate episode, averaging a "weak" 11.3%, even after Telecinco's decision to reshuffle the series from Wednesday to Tuesday and then again back to Wednesday.

Telecinco decided not to renew the series for a second season.

The web airing fared better becoming one of the most demanded online contents of Mediaset España's Mitele platform, and, well received abroad at the Cannes' MIPTV (joining the event's "Wit List"), DirecTV purchased its rights for the Americas.

Series	Episodes	Originally released			Viewers	Share (%)	Ref.
Series	Episodes	First released	Last released	Network	Viewers	Share (%)	Ref.
1	12	11 January 2012	4 April 2012	Telecinco	1,948,333	11.3	

No.	Title	Viewers	Original release date	Share (%)
1	"Anna y Daniel"	3,162,000	11 January 2012	16.9
2	"Entre nosotras"	2,448,000	18 January 2012	14.5
3	"Dos de junio"	2,267,000	25 January 2018	13.0
4	"Nadie podrá separarnos"	2,131,000	1 February 2012	11.5
5	"Al otro lado"	2,002,000	14 February 2012	10.6
6	"Juntos hasta la muerte"	1,815,000	21 February 2012	10.3
7	"El punto débil"	1,554,000	28 February 2012	11.3
8	"Betsy"	1,465,000	7 March 2012	10.8
9	"Miedo a la oscuridad"	1,674,000	14 March 2012	9.4
10	"Sacrificio"	1,550,000	21 March 2012	8.5
11	"Sin ti"	1,669,000	28 March 2012	8.6
12	"En algún lugar"	1,643,000	4 April 2012	10.4
