= Qué vida más triste =

- Created by: Natxo del Agua, Rubén Ontiveros
- Written by: Rubén Ontiveros
- Starring: Borja Pérez; Joseba Caballero; Nuria Herrera; Begoña de la Cruz; Laura Zamanillo; Santi Ugalde; Verónika Moral; Juanan Bilbao
- Country of origin: Spain
- Original language: Spanish
- No. of seasons: 7 (3 on Internet y 4 on TV)
- No. of episodes: 178

Production
- Running time: 22 min approx

Original release
- Network: laSexta, laSExta HD, laSexta 2
- Release: 19 October 2008 – 28 May 2010

Qué vida más triste (Spanish, 'What a sad life!') was a Spanish comedy series for Internet created by Natxo del Agua and Rubén Ontiveros, scripted and directed by the latter. Qué vida más triste achieved more than two million visits to its website at the start of the year 2008. This web also counted on several collaborations, such as Alejandro Tejería's. In October 2008 the format was adapted for a television series, broadcast by laSexta.

== Plot ==
The series deal with Borja, an ordinary guy from Basauri, spontaneous, fun and slightly cynical who works as a crane operator and still lives with his parents, that misadventures and amazing situations happen to every week. During the first three seasons, broadcast on Internet, Borja Pérez tells the spectators about his daily life, pretending he is filming a videoblog.

According to one of its creators, Rubén Ontiveros, the attractiveness of the series resides in the fact that we are used to watch superhero movies, people to whom extraordinary things happen, winners, people that overcome all problems and succeeds; but life is not like that. Borja represents a bit of all of us. Borja is a typical loser, with whom we can sometimes identify.

During the first few episodes, the series wanted to give the impression that what the spectators were seeing was an individual's real life. To support such a fiction, at times the camera recorded from unusual angles, as though it was hidden to capture a scene. or it showed us things that Borja did not want us to see. Later, particularly from its television broadcast, playing with the idea that it is really a fictional product, some episodes take place on the set, with the cameras at sight, as well as the spotlights and even technical staff. There are also episodes in which fantastic events happen, such as time travels, magic, space-time vortices, etc., but these episodes are exceptional. During the first seasons, the series had a strong continuity. The television format has caused the plot to develop more slowly, that some protagonist characters become secondary, or just disappear (Nuria and Izaskun have fallen out of the limelight and Laura has completely disappeared), whereas new ones have appeared (Borja's father, José Luis, Verónica and Sara).

== Structure ==
Each episode starts with Borja Pérez sitting on his bed, looking at the spectators. With great emphasis, he sets out a situation that has recently happened to him. But Borja is not often honest, and the spectator discovers he is lying because the narration is interspersed with flashbacks where we see what actually happened.

== Guest appearances ==
Through the course of the series, several famous actors, TV-speakers and other personalities played cameo parts: television presenters Patricia Conde and El Gran Wyoming, movie directors Nacho Vigalondo and Koldo Serra; and actors Óscar Jaenada, Gorka Otxoa and Ernesto Sevilla.

== Episodes ==
Internet
Season	Episodes	Season Premiere
1	54	27 April 2005
2	40	3 September 2006
3	12	6 April 2008
Television
Season	Episodes	Season Premiere
1	39	19 October 2008
2	22	27 April 2009
3	22	15 September 2009
4	26	12 April 2010

== Awards and nominations ==
TP de Oro Awards

Year	Category	Nominee	Result
2008	Best Television Series		Candidate
2008	Best Actor	Borja Pérez	Candidate
2009	Best Television Series		Candidate
2009	Best Actor	Borja Pérez	Candidate
