= Tutti per Bruno =

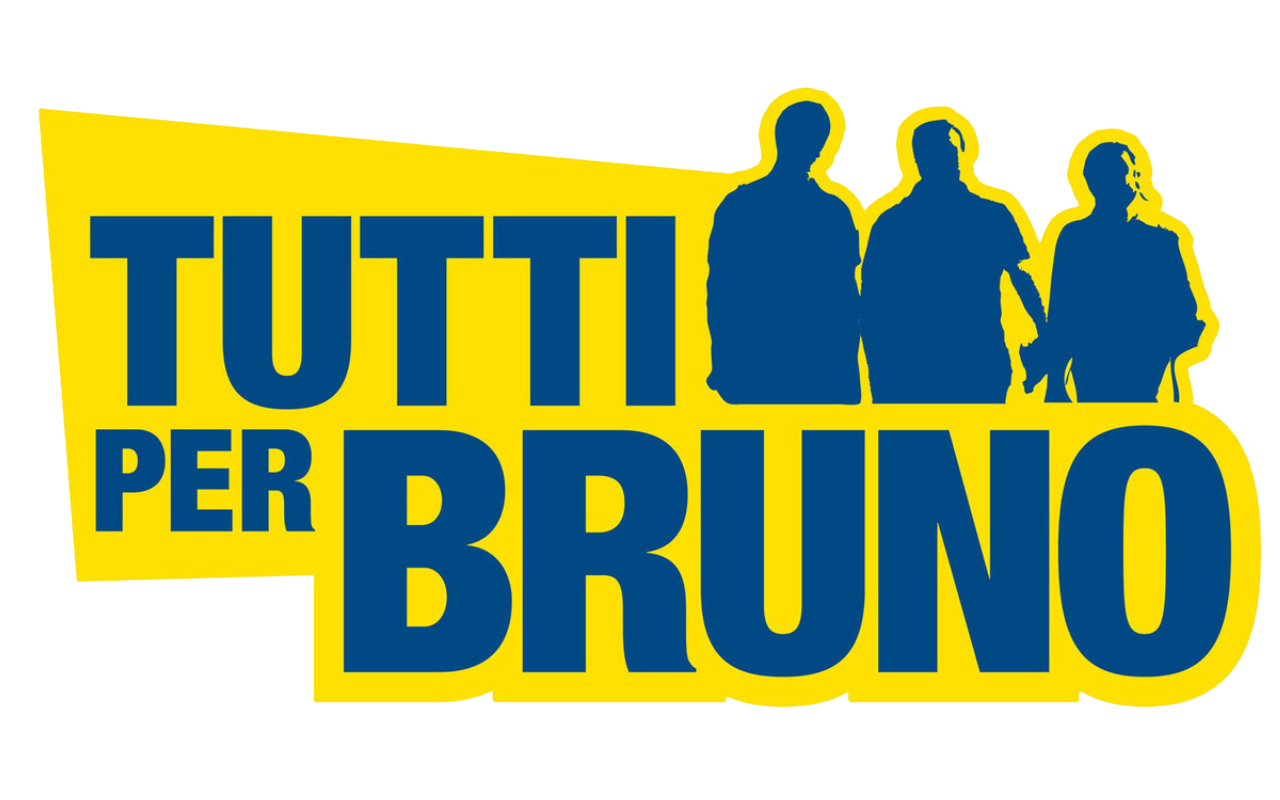
- Logo of the series
- Country of origin: Italy

Original release
- Network: Canale 5
- Release: 2010

Tutti per Bruno is an Italian television series. It is an adaptation of Los hombres de Paco. It premiered on Canale 5 in 2010.

== See also ==
- List of Italian television series
