= The Field of Stars =

- Theatrical release poster
- Spanish: El prado de las estrellas
- Directed by: Mario Camus
- Written by: Mario Camus
- Produced by: Rodolfo Montero de Palacio; Nano Montero Palacio
- Starring: Álvaro de Luna; Marián Aguilera; José Manuel Cervino; Antonio de la Torre; Rodolfo Sancho; Mari González
- Cinematography: Hans Burmann
- Edited by: José María Biurrun
- Music by: Sebastián Mariné
- Production companies: Cre-Acción Films; 2 y 4 Films; Proverfilms
- Release dates: 1 November 2007 (Seminci); 11 January 2008 (Spain)
- Country: Spain
- Language: Spanish

The Field of Stars (Spanish: El prado de las estrellas) is a 2007 Spanish drama film written and directed by Mario Camus which stars Álvaro de Luna, Marián Aguilera, José Manuel Cervino, Antonio de la Torre, Rodolfo Sancho, and Mari González. It is Camus' swan song.

== Plot ==
Set in rural Cantabria, the plot tracks several intertwined stories, including an elder man (Alfonso) paying visits to Nanda, who lives in a geriatric centre and the budding cycling talent of young Martín (brother of Luisa, an independent woman and social worker in the aforementioned geriatric centre who falls romantically for Ramiro, a mechanic). Martín is helped by Alfonso and his pal Tasio in order to fulfill his potential.

== Cast ==
- Álvaro de Luna as Alfonso
- Marián Aguilera as Luisa
- José Manuel Cervino as Tasio
- Antonio de la Torre as Ramiro
- Rodolfo Sancho as Mauri
- Mari González as Nanda
- Juan Margallo as Escobedo
- Óscar Abad as Martín
- Juan del Santo as Amado Beotegui
- Carlos Chamarro as Pedro
- Sonsoles Benedicto
- Antonio Valero

== Production ==
The screenplay was penned by Mario Camus. The film was produced by Cre-Acción Films alongside 2 y 4 Films and Proverfilms. Filming began on 16 October 2006 and wrapped in December 2006. Shooting locations included Cantabria (Comillas, Santander, Torrelavega, Valderredible, Cabuérniga, portillo de Lunada, and La Cavada) and the Province of Palencia (comarca of Aguilar de Campoo).

== Release ==
The film was selected for screening at the official selection of the 52nd Valladolid International Film Festival, where it premiered on 1 November 2007. It was theatrically released in Spain on 11 January 2008.

== Reception ==
Jonathan Holland of Variety deemed the film to be "an understated, cross-generational rural drama whose general air of lethargy is redeemed by a decent central perf and the beauty of its locations", in which the director "plays out its themes of emotional uncertainty, memory and loss to unconvincing effect".

Carlos Marañón of Cinemanía rated the film 3 out of 5 stars, positively pointing out that what in advance appeared to be a "tourism advertorial" paid by the Cantabrian government turns out to be simple story of well-performed solitudes, with an open ending.

== Accolades ==
Year	Award	Category	Nominee(s)	Result	Ref.
2008	22nd Goya Awards	Best Actor	Álvaro de Luna	Nominated	
2008	22nd Goya Awards	Best New Actor	Óscar Abad	Nominated	
2009	64th CEC Medals	Best Director	Mario Camus	Nominated	
2009	64th CEC Medals	Best Original Screenplay	Mario Camus	Nominated	

== See also ==
- List of Spanish films of 2008
