= Far from the Sea =

- Spanish: Lejos del mar
- Directed by: Imanol Uribe
- Screenplay by: Daniel Cebrián; Imanol Uribe
- Produced by: Antonio P. Pérez
- Starring: Elena Anaya; Eduard Fernández; José Luis García Pérez; Ignacio Mateos; Juan Motilla; Teresa Arbolí; Adrián Hernández; Olivia Delcán; Martxelo Rubio; Camino Texeira; Veronika Moral; Maica Barroso; Manuel Tallafé; Eva Almaya; Susi Sánchez
- Cinematography: Kalo Berridi
- Edited by: Búster Franco
- Production companies: Suroeste Films; Maestranza Films
- Distributed by: Vértice 360
- Release dates: 24 September 2015 (Zinemaldia); 2 September 2016 (Spain)
- Running time: 106 minutes
- Country: Spain
- Language: Spanish

Far from the Sea (Spanish: Lejos del mar) is a 2015 Spanish drama film directed by Imanol Uribe. It stars Eduard Fernández and Elena Anaya.

== Plot ==
Under the purview of the Parot doctrine, a repentant member of Euskadi Ta Askatasuna leaves prison, moves to the province of Almería to visit a former prison mate, and falls for the daughter of one of his victims.

== Cast ==
- Eduard Fernández as Santi
- Elena Anaya as Marina
- José Luis García Pérez
- Ignacio Mateos as Emilio
- Juan Motilla
- Teresa Arbolí
- Adrián Hernández
- Olivia Delcán
- Martxelo Rubio
- Camino Texeira
- Veronika Moral
- Maica Barroso
- Manuel Tallafé
- Eva Almaya
- Susi Sánchez

== Production ==
The film is a Maestranza Films and Suroeste Films production. It was mostly shot in between the Cabo de Gata and indoor locations of Almería.

== Release ==
The film world premiered at the 63rd San Sebastián International Film Festival on 24 September 2015. The press screening of the film was met by derisive laughter. After closing distribution, the commercial release was postponed several times. Distributed by Vértice 360, the film eventually opened in Spanish theatres on 2 September 2016.

== Reception ==
Andrea G. Bermejo of Cinemanía rated the film 1½ out of 5 stars, pointing out that previous levels of implausibility are surpassed when the former terrorist and the victim fall in love, "a laughable twist".

Jordi Batlle Caminal of Fotogramas rated the film 3 out of 5 stars, assessing that after the first hour, the film goes all out with the melodrama, "pushing the story's credibility to the breaking point".

Jordi Costa of El País stressed "the deeply unsettling nature of his proposal".

== See also ==
- List of Spanish films of 2016
