= The Silent War (2019 film) =

- Spanish: Sordo
- Directed by: Alfonso Cortés-Cavanillas
- Written by: Alfonso Cortés-Cavanillas; Juan Carlos Díaz Martín
- Starring: Asier Etxeandia; Marian Álvarez; Hugo Silva; Aitor Luna; Olimpia Melinte; Imanol Arias
- Distributed by: Filmax
- Release dates: March 22, 2019 (FCEM); September 13, 2019 (Spain)
- Country: Spain

The Silent War (Spanish: Sordo; lit. 'Deaf') is a 2019 Spanish war film written and directed by Alfonso Cortés-Cavanillas. The cast is led by Asier Etxeandia, Marian Álvarez, Hugo Silva, Aitor Luna, Olimpia Melinte and Imanol Arias.

== Plot ==
Set in 1944 Spain, the plot features a guerrilla fighter (maquis) who becomes deaf and has to survive a manhunt.

== Cast ==
- Asier Etxeandia as Anselmo Rojas.
- Aitor Luna
- Hugo Silva
- Imanol Arias
- Marian Álvarez
- Olimpia Melinte
- Stephanie Gil
- Ruth Díaz
- Jaime Martín
- Jorge Basanta
- Roberto Bonacini
- Javier Ballesteros
- Rocío Calvo
- Edu Mayo
- Cristóbal Suárez
- Íñigo Echevarría
- Antonio Dechent
- Manuel de Blas

== Production ==
It consists of an adaptation of the graphic novel Sordo by David Múñoz and Rayco Pulido. The film was written by the director alongside Juan Carlos Díaz Martín.

== Release ==
The Silent War was presented at the 22nd Málaga Film Festival (FCME) on March 22, 2019, as part of the festival's official selection. Distributed by Filmax, the film was theatrically released in Spain on September 13, 2019.

Netflix released the film on its streaming service on February 3, 2020.

== See also ==
- List of Spanish films of 2019
- List of films featuring the deaf and hard of hearing
