= The Truth About the Savolta Case =

1975 novel by Eduardo Mendoza Garriga

- Author: Eduardo Mendoza Garriga
- Original title: La verdad sobre el caso Savolta
- Translator: Alfred Mac Adam
- Language: Spanish
- Publisher: Seix Barral
- Publication date: 1975
- Publication place: Spain
- English publication date: 1 August 1992
- Pages: 440

The Truth About the Savolta Case (Spanish: La verdad sobre el caso Savolta) is a 1975 novel by the Spanish writer Eduardo Mendoza Garriga.

== Plot ==
The novel is set in Barcelona during World War I. The Frenchman Lepprince teams up with the Barcelona arms manufacturer Savolta and the lawyer Cortabanyes to secretly sell munition to Germany. The idealistic Javier Miranda works for Cortabanyes, becomes involved with Lepprince's mistress and is fed false leads when a journalist who seemed to be investigating the arms trade is found murdered.

== Reception ==
The novel was well received by both critics and readers. It was Mendoza's debut and quickly made him a well-known writer in Spain.

Kirkus Reviews wrote that the story moves slowly and reads like a "sometimes eye-crossing mosaic" containing many red herrings, irony and world-weariness.

Frederick Luciani of The New York Times wrote that the fragmentary plotting makes the book stand out from conventional detective novels. The book was published a few months after the end of the Franco regime and Luciani, writing in 1992, wrote that it has the "hip, cynical, stylish, iconoclastic" attitude that came to characterise post-Franco Spain, while retaining traits of the Franco years through its allusions to corruption at a high level that cannot be explicitly addressed.

The book was awarded the Premio de la Crítica de narrativa castellana in 1976.
