= Aitor Luna =

Spanish actor

- Born: Aitor González Luna; 18 September 1981 (age 45); Bergara, Spain
- Occupation: Actor
- Relatives: Yon González (brother)

Aitor González Luna (born 18 September 1981) is a Spanish actor. He earned early public recognition in Spain for his performance in Los hombres de Paco. He has since featured in series such as Gran Reserva, Las aventuras del capitán Alatriste or Cathedral of the Sea.

== Biography ==
Born on 18 September 1981 in Bergara, Gipuzkoa, son to Andalusian migrants in the Basque Country, he is the older brother of actor Yon González. Luna trained his acting chops at Ánima Eskola. He made his television debut in 2005 in the Basque soap opera Goenkale. He earned early public recognition in Spain for his performance from 2005 to 2009 as Gonzalo Montoya in Los hombres de Paco. He featured afterwards in La ira (TV movie, 2009), Gran Reserva (2010–2013) and La fuga (2012). In 2014, he landed the lead of the television adaptation of the Arturo Pérez Reverte's Capitán Alatriste novels, Las aventuras del capitán Alatriste, which proved to be an audience blunder. Among other performances, he has since featured in the final season of Velvet, as the lead of the historical drama series Cathedral of the Sea and in the Telemundo telenovela Enemigo íntimo.In 2021 he shot the short film with director Rubén Sánchez in Barcelona, where he intercepted a policeman.

== Filmography ==
Television

Year	Title	Role	Notes	Ref.
2005–09	Los hombres de Paco	Gonzalo Montoya	Main	
2010–13	Gran Reserva	Raúl Cortázar	Main	
2012	La fuga	Daniel Ochoa	Main	
2014	Cuéntame un cuento	Iván Dorado (La Bestia)	Episode: "La bella y la bestia"	
2014–15	Las aventuras del capitán Alatriste	Diego Alatriste	Main	
2016	Velvet	Humberto Santamaría	Main. Introduced in Season 4	
2017	Velvet Colección	Humberto Santamaría	Guest. Reprise of his role in Velvet	
2018	La catedral del mar (Cathedral of the Sea)	Arnau Estanyol	Main	
2020–21	Valeria	Sergio	Recurring	
2020	Enemigo íntimo	Martín Ustariz	Main. Introduced in Season 2	
2022	La última (Our Only Chance)			
2023	El silencio (Mute)	Cabrera		

=== Film ===
Year	Title	Role	Notes	Ref.
2015	Matar el tiempo (Killing Time)	Diego	Starring along his brother Yon	
2018	El aviso (The Warning)	Pablo		
2019	Sordo (The Silent War)	Capitán Bosch	Villain role	
2020	La isla de las mentiras	Tomás		
2024	La bandera	Antonio		

== Accolades ==
Year	Award	Category	Work	Result	Ref.
2011	20th Actors and Actresses Union Awards	Best Television Actor in a Secondary Role	Gran Reserva	Won	
