= The Incredible Shrinking Wknd =

- Theatrical release poster
- Spanish: El increíble finde menguante
- Directed by: Jon Mikel Caballero
- Written by: Jon Mikel Caballero
- Produced by: Pedro de la Escalera; Jon Mikel Caballero
- Starring: Iria del Río; Adam Quintero; Nadia de Santiago; Jimmy Castro; Irene Ruiz; Adrián Expósito; Luis Tosar
- Cinematography: Tânia da Fonseca
- Edited by: Miguel A. Trudu
- Music by: Luis Hernaiz
- Production companies: Montreux Entertainment; Trepamuros Producciones
- Distributed by: Oliete Films
- Release dates: 18 March 2019 (Málaga); 10 May 2019 (Spain)
- Country: Spain
- Language: Spanish

The Incredible Shrinking Wknd (Spanish: El increíble finde menguante) is a 2019 Spanish fantasy drama film written and directed by Jon Mikel Caballero in his directorial debut feature. It stars Iria del Río alongside Adam Quintero, Nadia de Santiago, Jimmy Castro, Irene Ruiz, and Adrián Expósito.

== Plot ==
30-year-old Alba goes with boyfriend Pablo and another two friend couples (Mark and Claudia and Sira and Mancha) to the countryside to spend the weekend, during which she and Pablo break up. She is then caught in a time loop, increasingly getting shorter with each iteration, forced to relive the painful events over and over again.

== Cast ==
- Iria del Río as Alba
- Adam Quintero as Pablo
- Nadia de Santiago as Sira
- Jimmy Castro as Mark
- Irene Ruiz as Claudia
- Adrián Expósito as Mancha
- Luis Tosar (voice only)

== Production ==
The film is a Montreux Entertainment and Trepamuros Producciones production. It was shot in the province of Segovia and Navarre.

== Release ==
The film premiered in the Zonazine section of the 22nd Málaga Film Festival on 18 March 2019. Distributed by Oliete Films, it was released theatrically in Spain on 10 May 2019.

== Reception ==
According to the review aggregation website Rotten Tomatoes, The Incredible Shrinking Wknd has a 79% approval rating based on 14 reviews from critics, with an average rating of 7.2/10.

Andrea G. Bermejo of Cinemanía rated the film 3 out of 5 stars summing it up to be Groundhog Day for millennials in crisis.

J Hurtado of ScreenAnarchy wrote that the film "will find an empathetic audience absolutely riveted by its profound simplicity", otherwise placing it "as one of the most compelling and affecting works of the year".

Desirée de Fez of Fotogramas rated the film 4 out of 5 stars, highlighting "its combination of play and reflection" as its hallmark.

== Accolades ==
Year	Award	Category	Nominee(s)	Result	Ref.
2020	7th Feroz Awards	Best Comedy Film		Nominated	

== See also ==
- List of Spanish films of 2019
