= Asier Etxeandia =

Spanish actor

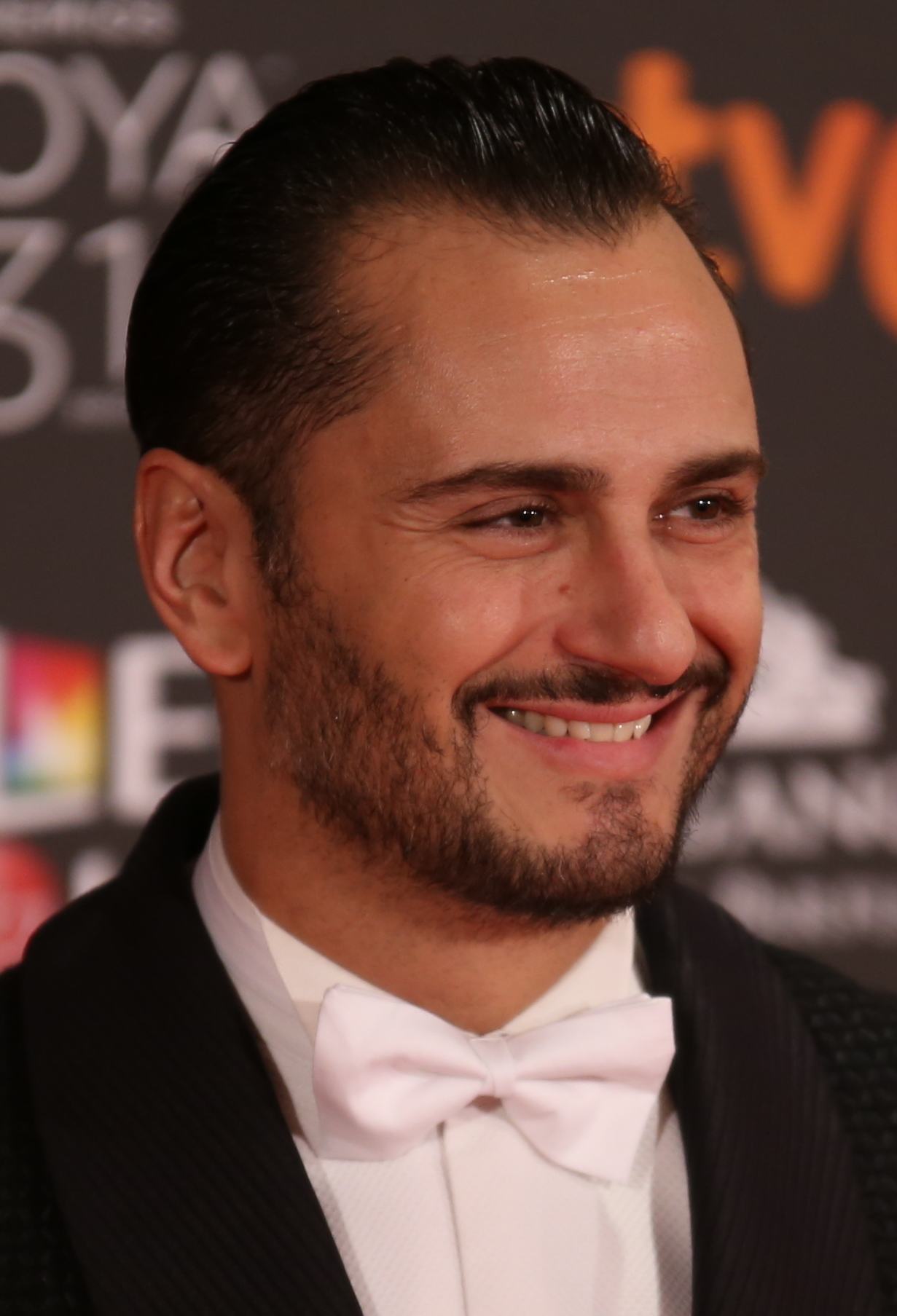
- Etxeandia in 2017
- Born: Asier Gómez Etxeandia; 27 June 1975 (age 51); Bilbao, Spain
- Occupations: Actor; singer
- Years active: 1996–present

Asier Gómez Etxeandia (born 27 June 1975) is a Spanish film actor and singer, whose career includes television, theater and film performances. He is best known for his character as Raúl de la Riva in Velvet and Velvet Colección and for Pain and Glory (2019), for which he was nominated for Goya Award for Best Supporting Actor.

== Biography ==
Asier Etxeandia studied acting at a Biscayan school, of which he only keeps fond memories of two teachers, Eguzki Zubia and Juan Carlos Garaizabal. He recently commented on its beginnings, noting that "when you are 19 years old, you trust your teachers to the end and sometimes they are not qualified, but in need of your admiration. I believed in them and they almost drove me crazy. They play with personal things, it is dangerous. I learned a lot about what not to do, how not to behave in this profession. The actor complained about the teachers who criticized the students who appeared on TV. He remembers a teacher who cut a boy's hair because she did not like his performance. "They had our brains so drained that we were delighted with that wonderful ritual," he sentenced.

Asier Etxeandia left the Basque Country when he settled in Madrid at the age of twenty. In the capital he came to work as a manager of a sex shop while he was studying acting. He went to the program Uno para todos, (Telecinco) in 1995, presented by Goyo González, as a contestant. The Globomedia production company hired him during the first season of One Step Ahead, where he played Beni, a homosexual who entered an arts academy with the hope of becoming an actor. Asier left the series because he feared possible typecasting. In spite of everything, he recognized that his work there opened doors for him and he met his first friends in the capital, including Natalia Millán.

Natalia Millán thought of him to star in the musical Cabaret offering him the role of Master of Ceremonies, the one in charge of commenting ironically on the events that take place in Germany in the 1930s . Manuel Bandera and Emilio Alonso León also worked on this montage . During the performance, Asier brought out members of the audience chosen at random, whom he put in trouble on stage. In order to carry out his work, Asier moved away from the interpretation that Joel Gray carried out in the film to be able to make his own creation, without thereby giving up the playful, ill-intentioned and captivating character of the character.

In 2005, he starred as Dante in the play Infierno by Tomaž Pandur inspired by the Divine Comedy staged at the Teatro María Guerrero.

He was cast in Pedro Almodóvar's Broken Embraces, playing a small role as a blind waiter, which was not included in the final cut, but whose scene is part of the additional content of the film on DVD.

== Personal life ==
Asier is openly gay.

== Filmography ==
=== Films ===
Year	Title	Role	Notes	Ref.
2004	La mirada violeta (The Violet Look)	Sergio		
2006	El próximo Oriente (The Near East)	Abel		
2007	Café solo o con ellas (Love Expresso)	Javi		
2007	Las 13 rosas (13 Roses)	Enrique		
2009	Mentiras y gordas (Sex, Party and Lies)	Cristo		
2011	El Capitán Trueno y el Santo Grial	Hassan		
2012	Los días no vividos	Jaime		
2014	Musarañas (Shrew's Nest)			
2015	Ma ma	Julián		
2015	La novia (The Bride)	El novio ('the bridegroom')		
2016	La puerta abierta (The Open Door)	Lupita		
2019	Dolor y gloria (Pain and Glory)	Alberto Crespo		
2019	Sordo (The Silent War)	Anselmo Rojas		
2022	Asombrosa Elisa (Amazing Elisa)	Héctor		
2023	Teresa	El inquisidor ('the inquisitor')		
2024	El molino	Jaime		
2025	La cena (The Dinner)	Alonso		

==== Short films ====
- ¡After!, as Koldo. Dir. Oskar Bilbao (1996)
- Dame otro final, as a stoner. Dir. Nerea Castro (2000)
- Vértices, as Mario. Dir. Juanan Martínez (2004)
- Unione Europea, as Tomás. Dir. Andrés M. Koppel (2007)
- Final, reparto. Dir. Hugo Martín Cuervo (2007)
- Together, as a man. Dir. Gigi Romero (2009)
- Supercool, as uncredited choreographer. Dir. Hugo Silva (2016)
- Por siempre jamón, script. Dir. Ruth Díaz (2014)
- El pelotari y la fallera, as Asier.

=== Television ===
Year	Title	Channel	Role	Notes
2000	Plats bruts	TV3		1 episode
2002	Un paso adelante	Antena 3	Benito "Beni" López	13 episodes
2004	Cuéntame cómo pasó	TVE	Mateo	5 episodes
2005	El comisario	Telecinco	Óscar	1 episode
2005	Los Serrano	Telecinco	Tomás Cruz	1 episode
2005	Motivos personales	Telecinco	David	6 episodes
2006	Cartas a Sorolla	Canal Nou		TV-Movie
2008	Cuenta atrás	Cuatro	Víctor	1 episodio
2008	Cuestión de sexo	Cuatro	Yago	3 episodes
2008 - 2009	Herederos	TVE	Gorka	22 episodes
2009 - 2010	Los hombres de Paco	Antena 3	Blackman	9 episodes
2010	Vuelo IL 8714	Telecinco	Emilio	TV-Movie
2011	El ángel de Budapest	TVE	Barrueta	TV-Movie
2012	La fuga	Telecinco	Miguel Reverte	12 episodes
2013	Tormenta	Antena 3	Carlos	TV-Movie
2013	Amar es para siempre	Antena 3	Rubén Tudela	33 episodes
2014 - 2016	Velvet	Antena 3	Raúl de la Riva	47 episodes
2017	El final del camino	TVE	Alfonso VI de León	7 episodes
2017 - 2019	Velvet Colección	Movistar+	Raúl de la Riva	21 episodes
2020	La línea invisible	Movistar+	El Inglés	6 episodes
2021	Sky Rojo	Netflix	Romeo	15 episodes

=== Theatre ===
- Cabaret (2003-2005)
- El infierno (2005)
- La divina comedia, as Dante Alighieri (2005)
- El sueño de una noche de verano, as Teseo y Oberón. Dir. Tamzin Townsend (2006-2007)
- Barroco, as Valmont (2007)
- Los lunes pueden esperar (2008)
- Hamlet (2009)
- Medea (2009)
- Homero, La Iliada, lectura dramatizada. Dir. Andrea D'Odorico (2010)
- La avería (2011)
- La chunga. Dir. Joan Ollé (2013)
- El intérprete (2013)

== Discography ==
- Musical Cabaret, B.S.O. (2003)
- Un rayo de luz, tema: But the world goes round (2006)
- Obra de teatro El sueño de una noche de verano, temas: Canción de Oberón y Lágrimas de Rocío (2007)
- Película Las 13 rosas, tema: J'attendrai (2007)
- Obra de teatro Barroco, B.S.O. (2007)
- Obra de teatro Hamlet, B.S.O. (2009)
- X1FIN: Juntos por el Sahara, tema: Sympathy for the devil, dúo con Pastora (2009)
- El paso trascendental del vodevil a la astracanada, tema: ¿Por qué a mí me cuesta tanto?, dúo con Fangoria (2010)
- Obra de teatro Algo de ruido hace, B.S.O. (2011)
- Colaboración en la canción Tercer Mundo del disco Los Viajes Inmóviles de Nach (2014)
- Redención, primera canción de Mastodonte, dúo que forma junto al músico italiano Enrico Barbaro (2018)
- Trilogía "Anatomía de un Éxodo", formada por las canciones Malenka, Glaciar y Este Amor.
- Disco "Mastodonte" compuesto por Mastodonte, grupo formado por Asier Etxeandía y Enrico Barbaro.
- "Simplemente Perfecto" canción principal de la BSO de la película "Sordo".

== Awards and nominations ==
=== Latin Grammy Awards ===
Year	Category	Result
2019	Best Music Video	Nominated

=== Goya Awards ===
Year	Category	Film	Result:
2019	Best Supporting Actor	Dolor y gloria	Nominated
2015	Best Actor	La novia	Nominated

=== Platino Awards ===
Year	Category	Film	Result:
2018	Best Actor in a Series	Velvet Collection	Nominated

=== Fotogramas de Plata ===
Year	Category	Film	Result:
2016	Mejor actor de televisión	Velvet	Nominado
2014	Mejor actor de televisión	Velvet	Nominado
2013	Mejor actor de teatro	El Intérprete	Ganador
2003	Mejor actor de teatro	Cabaret	Nominado

=== Actors and Actresses Union Awards ===
Año	Categoría	Obra	Resultado
2020	Second Best Actor	Dolor y Gloria	Won
2015	Best Actor	La novia	Nominated
2015	Second Best Actor (television)	Velvet	Won
2013	Best Theatre Actor	El intérprete	Won
2011	Best Theatre Actor	La avería	Won
2007	Best Theatre Actor	Barroco	Nominated
2003	Best Actor	Cabaret	Won

=== Max Awards ===
Year	Category	Theatre Work	Result
2012	Best Theatre Actor	La avería	Won
2009	Best Theatre Actor	Barroco	Nominated
2005	Mejor actor protagonista	Infierno	Precandidato

=== Ercilla Awards ===
Year	'Category	Theatre Work	Result
2009	Best Theatre Actor	Barroco	Won

=== Málaga Spanish Film Festival ===
Año	Categoría	Obra de teatro	Resultado
2009	Premio Renfe a nuevos valores del cine español	7 minutos	Ganador
