= Olivia Delcán =

Spanish actress, playwright (b. 1992)

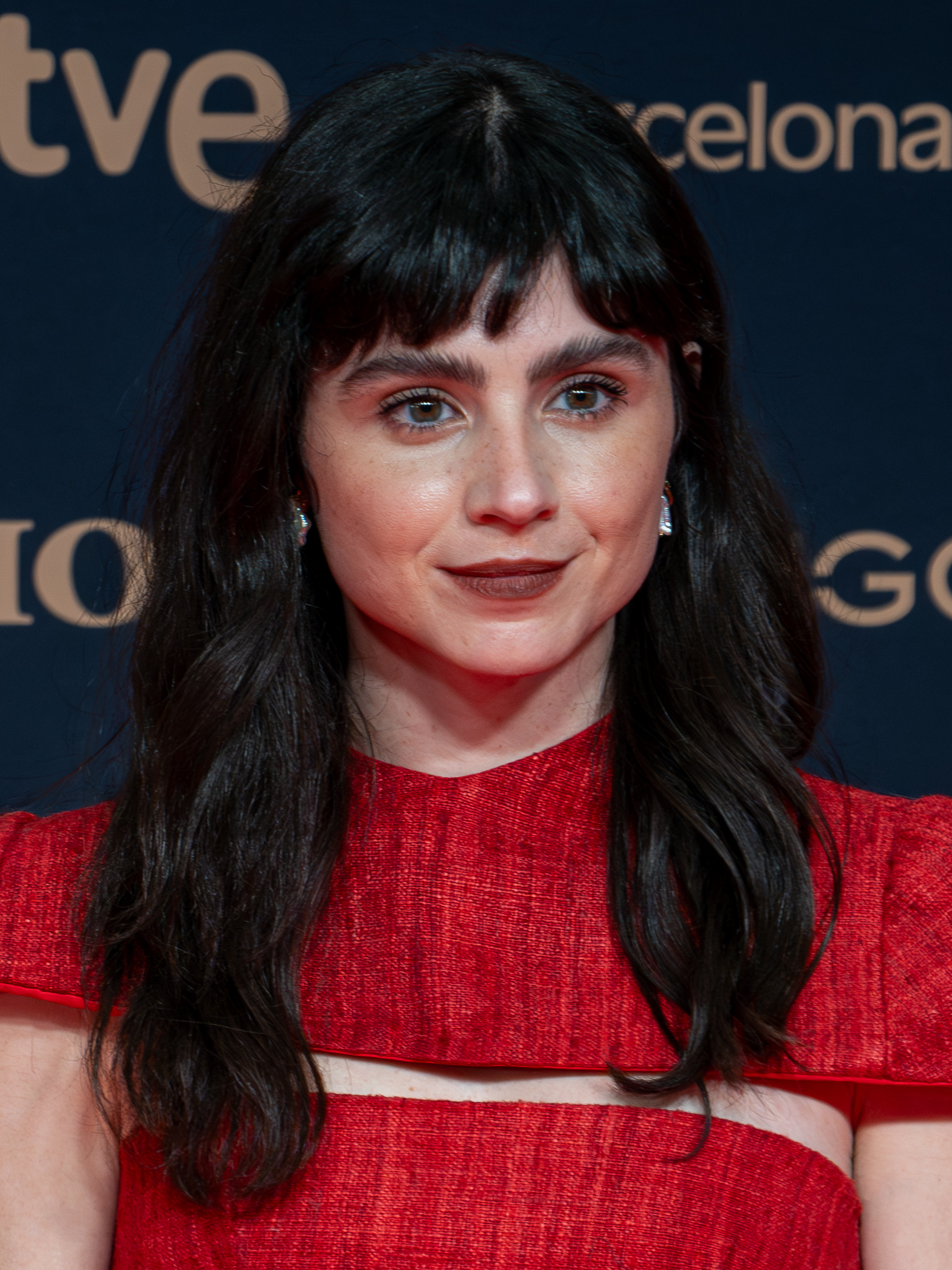
- Delcán in 2026
- Born: Olivia Delcán Román; 29 May 1992 (age 34); Menorca, Balearic Islands, Spain
- Occupations: Actress, playwright, director
- Website: www.pilargonzalez.eu/oliviadelcan.html

Olivia Delcán Román (born 29 May 1992) is a Spanish actress, playwright and director. As an actress she has appeared as Olivia in the feature film Isla bonita and Far from the Sea both in 2015. On television Delcán has played regular roles as Bambi in Locked Up in Vis a Vis (season 2), as Vicky López in Drug Squad: Costa del Sol and as Sister Camila in Warrior Nun in 2020.

== Biography ==
Olivia Delcán Román was born on 29 May 1992 in Menorca,, Balearic Islands. spending her childhood between Los Angeles, New York City, Menorca and Madrid. She studied acting at and is an alumna of the William Esper Studio for the performing arts in Manhattan.

== Acting career ==
Olivia Delcán as an actress, has appeared in two movies Isla bonita and as Anabel in Lejos del mar (Far from the Sea), which was screened at the 63rd San Sebastián International Film Festival in 2015. Delcán attended the Fotogramas Awards 2015 representing the film Isla bonita at the Joy Eslava Club, Madrid on March 7, 2016. of which, Delcán attended the closing ceremony at Kursaal in San Sebastián, Spain, to represent a special screening of the film Far from the Sea Delcán was nominated for the CEC award 'Best New Actress' (Mejor Actriz Revelación) at the 2016 Cinema Writers Circle Awards, Spain for her interpretation of Olivia in Isla bonita. In 2016, Delcán won the Turia award for 'Best New Actress' (Mejor Actriz Revelación) at the 2016 Turia Awards, Spain for her interpretation of Olivia in Isla bonita., and won the G Award for 'Best Actress' at the 2017 Giffoni Film Festival for acting in the short film El vestido (The Dress).

In 2016, Delcán has played regular roles as Bambi in nine episodes of Locked Up (Vis a Vis (season 2)) , In 2019, she played Vicky López for 13 episodes of Drug Squad: Costa del Sol.

From 2020 to 2022, she played a recurring role as Sister Camila in Warrior Nun for 2 series. In 2020, Delcán played one of six unnamed protagonists in Guillermo Benet's first feature film Los inocentes (The Innocents) which was due for release in March 2021.

== Writing and directing ==
Delcán wrote and directed the play About last night which is a ‘millennial tragedy’ about a girl who basically, parties her life away. The play was written when Delcán was aged just 24 in 2016, and brought to the stage in 2019 directed by Delcán at Café Berlin in Madrid.

== Filmography ==
=== Film ===
Year	Title	Role
2015	Criaturas de la Tierra (Creatures of the Earth) (Short)	Marisa
2015	Lejos del mar (Far from the Sea)	Anabel
2015	Isla bonita (Pretty Island)	Olivia
2015	Los últimos días del cine (The last days of Cinema) (Short)	Sol
2017	Pippermint (Short)	Julia
2017	El Vestido (The Dress) (Short)	G Award 'Best Actress' winner
2018	Los inocentes (The Innocents) (Short)	unnamed protagonist
2019	Arenal (Short)	-
2019	Gusts of Wild Life (Ráfagas de vida salvaje) (Short)	Tía
2020	Eva's comet (Cometa de Eva) (Short)	Progressive Daughter
2020	Los inocentes (The Innocents)	unnamed protagonist
2021	Josefina (Josephine)	Josi

=== Television ===
Year	Title	Role	Notes
2016	Vis A Vis – season 2 (Locked Up)	Bambi	9 episodes
2019	Drug Squad: Costa del Sol (Brigada Costa del Sol)	Vicky López	13 episodes
2021	Doctor Portuondo	Estela	6 episodes
2020–2022	Warrior Nun (Monja Guerrera) Season 2	Sister Camila	16 episodes

== Awards and nominations ==
Year	Award	Category	Nominated work	Result	Ref.
2015	23rd Solidarity Festival of Spanish Cinema of Cáceres	San Pancracio award as best new actress	Isla bonita	Won	
2016	Cinema Writers Circle Awards, Spain	CEC award - Best New Actress	Isla bonita	Nominated	
2016	Días de Cine Awards, Spain	Best Spanish Actress	Isla bonita	Nominated	
2016	Turia Awards, Spain	Best New Actress	Isla bonita	Won	
2017	Giffoni Film Festival G Awards	Best Actress (Short film)	El Vestido (The Dress)	Won	
