= Laura Sánchez (model) =

Spanish model and actress

- Born: Laura Sánchez López; 29 May 1981 (age 45); Groß-Gerau, West Germany
- Occupations: Model, actress
- Children: Naia

Laura Sánchez López (born 29 May 1981) is a Spanish model and television actress.

== Modeling ==
Sánchez began her modeling career in Huelva, and broke through when Victorio & Lucchino, fashion designers in Seville, hired her as a clothes model, although she fell down during their Spring/Summer 2001 fashion show (held in Madrid on 6 September 2000). In 1998 Sánchez won the Spanish Elite Model Look contest, in which fellow model Ariadne Artiles was also a finalist.

Agencies:

- General Services Doble Erre
- Next Model Management - Paris
- Time Models
- SS & M Model Management
- Models Stockholmsgruppen
- Why Not Model Agency
- Next Company
- Yuli Models

== Television work ==
- Los hombres de Paco (Paco's Men), 2008-2010 - a police procedural comedy on Antena 3. Sánchez portrayed Pepa Miranda, a lesbian police officer who falls in love with and marries her squad's forensic pathologist, Silvia Castro (portrayed by Marián Aguilera). She is heartbroken by the death of her wife and she seeks revenge to arrest the murderer.
- La Fuga (The Escape), 2012 - a science fiction serial on Telecinco.

== Personal life ==
Born in Groß-Gerau, West Germany, her family relocated to Huelva when she was two months old. Sánchez had a relationship with footballer Aitor Ocio, with whom she had a daughter, Naia, born on 1 August 2006, until the couple split in March 2009.
