= Veronika Moral =

Spanish actress

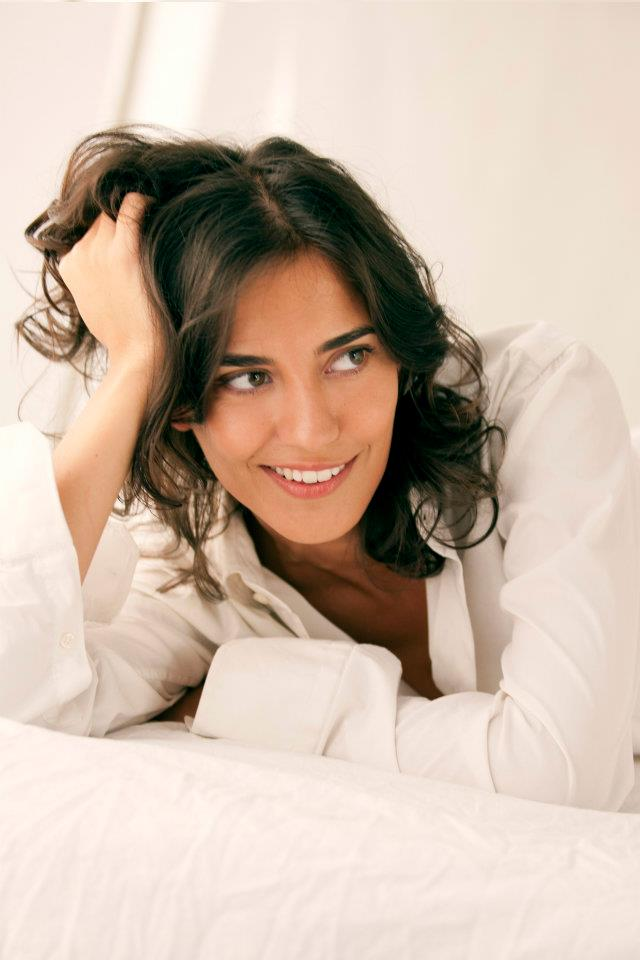
- Born: Verónica Moral; 30 August 1978 (age 48); Burgos, Spain
- Occupation: Actress
- Years active: 1999–present

Veronika Moral (born Verónica Moral; 30 August 1978) is a Spanish actress known for appearing in the telenovela Amar en tiempos revueltos and in Compañeros, Física o Química, Qué vida más triste, Ciega a citas, Vis a vis, Lejos del mar, La novia and Zipi y Zape y el club de la canica.

== Early life ==
Moral was born on 30 August 1978 in Burgos, the sixth of her sisters. She lived there until age 8 when she and her family moved to San Sebastián (Basque). She studied business.

== Career ==
Her debut was in 1999 under Eneko Olasagasti and Carlos Zabalacon. Verónica debuted in the film Sí, quiero...

In 2001, she appeared in an episode of Policías en el corazón de la calle and Ciudad Sur.

She appeared in a short-film titled Primera persona, directed by Gorka Merchán in 2002. That same year, she appeared in Compañeros (Partners) and theatrical play Federica de Bramante o las florecitas del fango directed by Pedro G. de las Heras.

TV projects included two continuing roles in the series Tres son multitud (Telecinco, 2003) and Capital (Telemadrid, 2004), including a part in Paco y Veva (TVE, 2004). She appeared in some episodes from the series Los Serranos (Telecinco, 2005).

During 2006, Moral appeared in a TV-movie, Mobbing by Sonia Sánchez. In 2007, she contributed to Tres de Ases: el secreto de la Atlántida directed by Joseba Vázquez and the serie C.I.A.: No somos ángeles.

Between 2008 and 2009, Moral appeared in Plan América, Física o Química, Los misterios de Laura, Qué vida más triste and Euskolegas in ETB 2 TV.

Moral is known for her work in Amar en tiempos revueltos from 2009 until 2010.

She appeared in films such as L'assiette de mon voisin by David Merlin-Dufey and Olivier Riche, Zipi y Zape y el club de la canica by Oskar Santos, La novia by Paula Ortiz and Lejos del mar by Imanol Uribe. She appeared in Los quién, Frágiles, Ciega a citas and Gym Tony. She Verónica also appears in Vis a vis (Locked Up) acting as a policewoman and portrayed Carmen de Icaza in the miniseries Lo que escondían sus ojos and in Mar de plástico.

In 2017, Moral appeared in the series Perdóname Señor.

== TV series ==
- Goenkale (ETB 1)
- Jaun ta Jabe (ETB 1)
- El Show de (ETB 2)
- Campus (ETB 2)
- Alquilados (ETB 2)
- Ciudad Sur (2001) (Antena 3)
- Policías, en el corazón de la calle (2001), cap. "Los últimos versos que yo escribo" Antena 3
- Compañeros (2002) (5 capítulos) as Laura (Antena 3)
- Tres son multitud (2003) as María (Telecinco)
- Qué vida más triste (2008) as herself
- Locked Up (2016) as Helena Martín (Antena 3)
- Perdóname, señor (2017) as Marta Soler

== Filmography ==
- El colchón de Roberto Perez-Toledo, Corto (2015)
- Lejos del mar de Imanol Uribe, (2014) as Asun
- La novia de Paula Ortiz, (2014) as Muchacha 2
- Una vez de María Guerra y Sonia Madrid, Short-film (2014)

== Music video ==
- Alis (2013), track "Cantos de ocasión"
