= The City of Marvels =

1986 historical fiction Spanish novel by Eduardo Mendoza Garriga

- Author: Eduardo Mendoza Garriga
- Translator: Bernard Molloy
- Publisher: Pocket Books
- Publication date: 1986
- Publication place: Spain
- English publication date: April 1, 1990
- ISBN: 9780671702342

The City of Marvels is a 1986 Spanish historical fiction novel written by Eduardo Mendoza Garriga about Barcelona and its cultural evolution during the turn of the 20th century. Its central character, Onofre Bouvila, represents a lower class character and their collective ideology.

In 1990, Bernard Molloy translated the novel into English.

== Plot ==
The protagonist of the story is Onofre Bouvila, a man who grows up in a small rural town in Catalonia. As a child, he sees his father leave the town for Cuba to become rich. Although he sends letters on his voyage, the letters soon stop. Many years later his father returns and appears to have accumulated great wealth. Soon, the family learns that he was unsuccessful and borrowed money from the mafia in Barcelona to purchase a suit.

Years later, Onofre travels to Barcelona in order to find a job. He finds an inn that is run by a father along with his daughter Delfina. As Onofre finds himself unable to get work, Delfina helps him by introducing him to a group of anarchists. His job becomes the distribution of anarchist pamphlets which puts him at odds with the city officials and the guards.

Onofre distributes these pamphlets for a while at the world trade fair construction site, however he soon realises he isn't being adequately rewarded for his efforts so he begins to sell hair restorer to tradesmen from the fair. Here he meets his right-hand man Efren who provides the muscle. After this Onofre becomes a gangster working for one of the bosses of Barcelona, through a clever plan he successfully takes over the gang and kicks out the other gangs in town.

Onofre's dealings become less violent but no more legitimate. Barcelona's expansion plan is in full swing and plots of land on the outskirts of town are rapidly changing value depending on the rumours of where metro lines will be created. Through misguiding buyers, Onofre makes his fortune here.

After this Onofre invests in the silent movie business, before having to go into exile when Primo de Rivera comes to power. After this he is forced into retirement. However, by this stage he is one of the most powerful and rich men in Spain. He obsessively renovates his Mansion while ignoring his family and spending the majority of his nights in brothels.

As the book draws to a close, Onofre becomes more pensive and meets another woman who takes his fancy. Her father is an inventor whom he had met many years ago; he agrees to support Onofre's project to build a form of a blimp. Onofre falls for the woman and has one night with her before the unveiling of their project and the next world trade fair in 1929.

Finally, Onofre dies when their Blimp crashes into the sea at the world trade fair.

== Reception ==
After discussing the various ways the novel captures and intrigues the reader, Jonathan Franzen, writing for the Los Angeles Times, states, " It’s all fairly interesting, but when the book ends ... what lingers is not the memory of a real Onofre Bouvila but only the spirit of the hard, flamboyant era he represents." Franzen further states that "though modern-day Catalonians may find fascinating his account of Barcelona’s architectural growing pains, the impartial reader working through the 10th dense page of it may be forgiven for asking: Is this book for me?" Franzen answers this question by saying,

To the extent that Mendoza tries at all to answer this question and find general truth in specific history, he does it as a cynic, highlighting in every anecdote the ugly, the venal, the ridiculous, the cruel. ... To depict an entire epoch in this way is arrogant if we’re meant to believe the world has improved since then; profoundly diminishing if we’re meant to believe it hasn’t.

Similarly, Kirkus Reviews said the novel was "[p]leasant enough reading, but no grabber; the cool, level tone ... sees to that, along with the ice-cold Onofre, who becomes progressively dwarfed by the scale of events."

Publishers Weekly added, "Unfortunately, the characterization remains opaque, though the novel entertains and informs with its panorama of Catalan politics and social life, the advent of cinema and flying machines, and amusing cameos of Rasputin and Mata Hari."

Awards for The City of Marvels
Year	Award	Result	Ref.
1989	Los Angeles Times Book Prize for Fiction	Finalist	
1988	Premio Grinzane Cavour for Narrativa Straniera	Nominee	

== Film adaptation ==
The novel was adapted into a 1999 Spanish film of the same name, with Olivier Martinez as Onofre Bouvila and Emma Suárez as Delfina.
