= Eduardo Mendoza Garriga =

Spanish novelist

Eduardo Mendoza
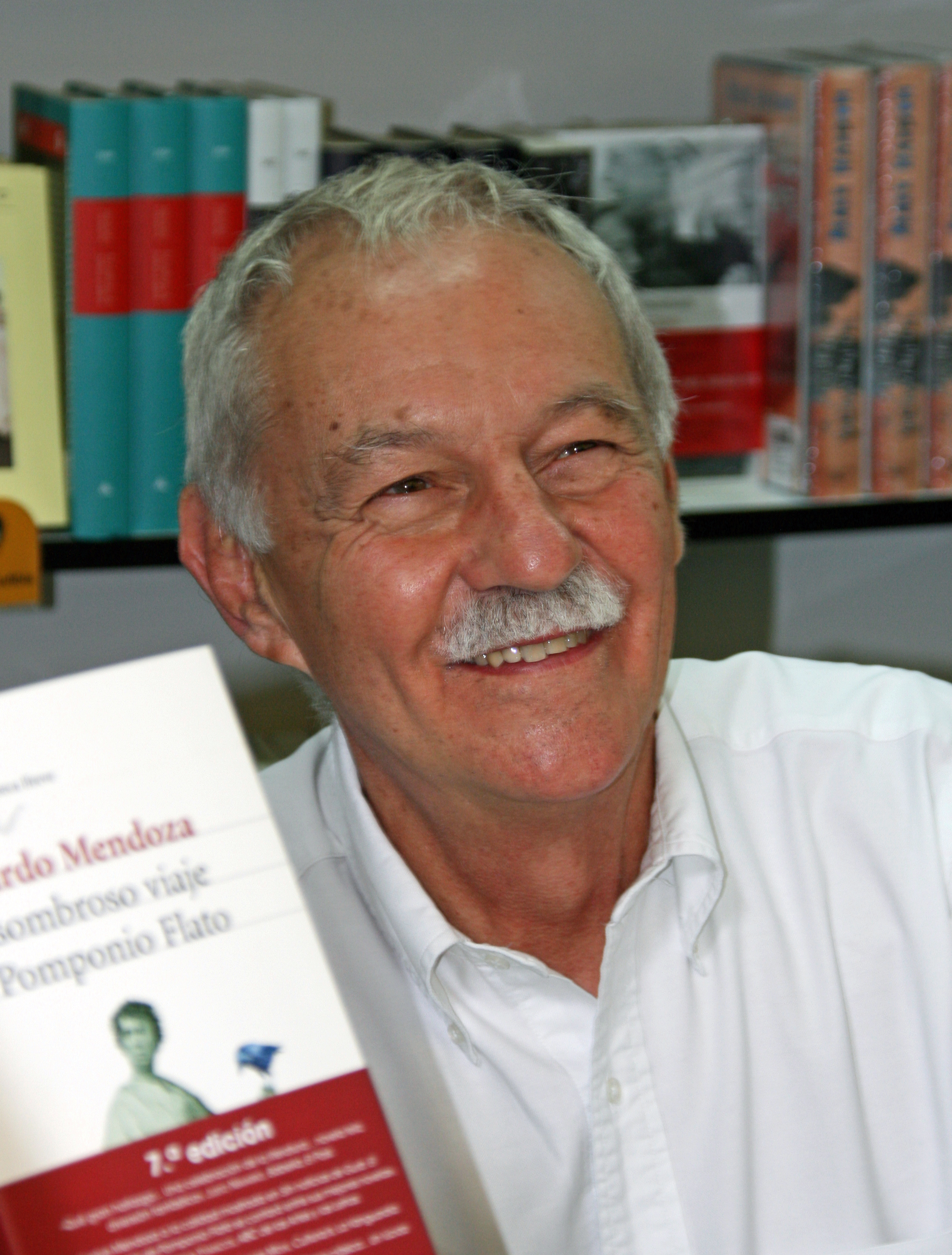
- Born: Eduardo Mendoza Garriga; 11 January 1943 (age 83); Barcelona, Spain
- Writing career
- Language: Spanish

Eduardo Mendoza Garriga (born 11 January 1943) is a Spanish novelist, playwright, and essayist. His first novel, La Verdad sobre el Caso Savolta (The Truth About the Savolta Case), published in 1975, reflected the social changes as Spain transitioned to democracy, and was very successful. His 1986 novel, La Ciudad de los Prodigios (The City of Marvels), is widely acclaimed, and he is also known for his "mad detective" parody novels, in particular El Laberinto de las Aceitunas (The Olive Labyrinth, 1982).

== Early life and education ==
Eduardo Mendoza Garriga was born on 11 January 1943 in Barcelona.

He studied law in the early 1960s and lived in New York City between 1973 and 1982, working as interpreter for the United Nations. He attempted practising as a lawyer, but realised that he wanted to be a writer. He currently lives in London.

== Career ==
In 1975, Mendoza published his very successful first novel, La Verdad sobre el Caso Savolta (The Truth About the Savolta Case), where he shows his ability to use different resources and styles. The novel is considered a precursor to the social change in the Spanish post-Franco society and the first novel of the transition to democracy. He describes the union fights at the beginning of the 20th century, showing the social, cultural and economic conditions of workers in Barcelona by that time.

His most acclaimed novel is probably La Ciudad de los Prodigios (The City of Marvels, 1986), about the social and urban evolution of Barcelona between the Universal Expositions of 1888 and 1929. It was adapted for film by Mario Camus in 1999.

In 1992, he published the novel, El Año del Diluvio (The Year of the Flood), which tells of the inner conflicts faced by Sister Consuelo after she meets and falls in love with Augusto Aixelâ, with evocative descriptions of the post-civil war prevailing deprivations in Spain by that time. In 1996, he published his third major Barcelona-related novel, this time set in the 1940s, Una Comedia Ligera (A Light Comedy).

Several of Mendoza's novels feature the "mad detective", a peculiar character, a nameless accidental-detective locked up in a mental hospital. The first of these novels, El Misterio de la Cripta Embrujada (The Mystery of the Enchanted Crypt, 1979) is a parody with hilarious moments mixing hard-boiled genre with Gothic narrative. The second novel of the saga, El Laberinto de las Aceitunas (The Olive Labyrinth, 1982) is one of his most successful works. The third novel of the saga, La Aventura del Tocador de Señoras (The Adventure of the Ladies' Dressing Table), and the fourth one, El Enredo de la Bolsa y la Vida (The Money and the Life Muddle), were published in 2001 and 2012, respectively. The 5th novel was released in 2015 under the title of El Secreto de la Modelo Extraviada (The Secret of the Missing Model) with great success.

The Spanish newspaper El País published two of his novels in instalments, Sin Noticias de Gurb (No Word from Gurb, 1990) and El Último Trayecto de Horacio Dos (The Last Journey of Horatio Dos, 2001), both of them science fiction comedy novels.

In 1993 he published his first play, Restauració (Restoration), written in Catalan and later translated into Spanish by Mendoza himself. This was followed by two other plays, with the three works published together in 2017.

In 2018 he published the novel El Rey Recibe (The King Receives), the first book in the Three Laws of Motion trilogy, which explores the major developments of the second half of the 20th century.

== Critical appraisal ==
Mendoza's narrative studies divide his work into serious or major novels, and humorous or minor ones, although recent studies have shown the seriousness, criticism and transcendence in his parodic novels, as well as the humour present in his serious ones, due to the influence of the characteristics of the postmodern novel.

== Recognition and awards ==
Mendoza is considered among the most important Spanish living writers. He is included in the so-called Spanish New Narrative.

He has won many awards, including:

- 1976: Critics Prize, for debut novel La Verdad sobre el Caso Savolta
- 2010: Premio Planeta de Novela, for his novel Riña de Gatos. Madrid, 1936 (An Englishman in Madrid)
- 2013: European Book Prize (fiction), also for An Englishman in Madrid
- 2015: Franz Kafka Prize, the first Spanish writer to win it
- 2016: Miguel de Cervantes Prize, the most prestigious prize for Spanish-written literature
- 2024: Premio Cultura (Culture Award) in the Premios Vanguardia
- 2025: Princess of Asturias Award in Literature.

== Bibliography ==
=== Novels ===
- 1975: La verdad sobre el caso Savolta
- 1979: El misterio de la cripta embrujada (1st novel from the nameless detective series)
- 1982: El laberinto de las aceitunas (2nd from the nameless detective series)
- 1986: La ciudad de los prodigios
- 1989: La isla inaudita
- 1990: Sin noticias de Gurb (published in instalments by El País)
- 1992: El año del diluvio
- 1996: Una comedia ligera
- 2001: La aventura del tocador de señoras (3rd novel from the nameless detective series)
- 2002: El último trayecto de Horacio Dos (published in instalments by El País)
- 2006: Mauricio o las elecciones primarias
- 2008: El asombroso viaje de Pomponio Flato
- 2010: Riña de gatos. Madrid 1936 (Premio Planeta)
- 2012: El enredo de la bolsa y la vida (4th novel from the nameless detective series)
- 2015: El secreto de la modelo extraviada (5th novel from the nameless detective series)
- 2018: El rey recibe (1st novel from the 'Three laws of movement' series)
- 2019: El negociado del yin y el yang (2nd novel from the 'Three laws of movement' series)
- 2021: Trasbordo en Moscú (3rd novel from the 'Three laws of movement' series)
- 2024: Tres enigmas para la Organización

=== Short stories ===
- 2009: Tres vidas de santos (La ballena, El final de Dubslav and El malentendido)
- 2011: El camino del cole (children's book)

=== Theatre ===
- 1993: Restauración
- 2000: Gloria: Comedia en un acto
- 2004: Grandes preguntas
- 2017: Teatro reunido (Restauración, Gloria and Grandes cosas)

=== Essays ===
- 1986: Nueva York
- 1989: Barcelona modernista (co-written with his sister Cristina)
- 2001: Baroja, la contradicción (biographic essay)
- 2007: ¿Quién se acuerda de Armando Palacio Valdés?
- 2017: ¿Que está pasando en Cataluña?
- 2020: Las barbas del profeta
