= Cristina Plazas =

Spanish actress

- Plazas in 2026
- Born: 30 September 1969 (age 57); Madrid, Spain
- Occupation: Actress
- Years active: 1999-present

Cristina Plazas (born 30 September 1969) is a Spanish actress. She has appeared in over 50 films since 1999. She is known for her supporting role in the Spanish crime drama television series Vis a Vis.

== Selected filmography ==
Year	Title	Role	Notes
2006	Go Away from Me	Ana	
2010	Three Steps Above Heaven		
2010	For the Good of Others		
2011	Don't Be Afraid		
2012	The Body		
2015–2016	Vis a Vis	directriz Miranda aguirre	
2016	El padre de Caín	Madre de Mercedes	
