= A Sucker's Born Every Minute =

- Theatrical release poster
- Spanish: Cada día nace un listo
- Directed by: Arantxa Echevarría
- Screenplay by: Arantxa Echevarría; Patricia Campo
- Produced by: Jaime Ortiz de Artiñano; Gonzalo Salazar-Simpson; Luis Ferrón
- Starring: Hugo Silva; Susi Sánchez; Dafne Fernández; Jaime Olías; Ginés García Millán; Diego Anido; Belén Rueda; Pedro Casablanc; Gonzalo de Castro
- Cinematography: Pilar Sánchez Díaz
- Edited by: Victoria Lammers
- Music by: Zeltia Montes Muñoz
- Production companies: Lazona; Olarizu Films AIE; Atresmedia Cine; Lazona Zinema; Lamia Producciones
- Distributed by: A Contracorriente Films
- Release dates: 13 March 2026 (Málaga); 5 June 2026 (Spain)
- Running time: 97 minutes
- Country: Spain
- Language: Spanish

A Sucker's Born Every Minute (Spanish: Cada día nace un listo) is a 2026 Spanish black comedy film co-written and directed by Arantxa Echevarría. The cast is led by Hugo Silva.

== Plot ==
Former talent show participant Toni Lomas, now at a low ebb, is contracted by Junior (the scion of a powerful businessman) via former fling Malena to steal a valuable painting from the family house, teaming up with La Mari and El Gallego.

== Cast ==
- Hugo Silva as Toni Lomas
- Susi Sánchez as la Mari
- Dafne Fernández as Malena
- Diego Anido as el Gallego
- Sofía Otero
- Jaime Olías as Junior
- Ginés García Millán
- Marcos Marín
- Marina Ostolaza
- Javier Tolosa
- Pedro Casablanc
- Gonzalo de Castro
- Belén Rueda

== Production ==
Echevarría described the film as a "satirical thriller or a black comedy". The film was produced by Atresmedia Cine, Lazona Producciones, Lazona Films and Olarizu Films AIE alongside Lamia Producciones Audiovisuales, and it had the participation of Atresmedia, EiTB, and Netflix. Shooting locations included Gipuzkoa and Biarritz. Pilar Sánchez worked as director of photography, using an Arri Alexa 35 camera and Cooke Anamorphic SF lenses.

== Release ==
The film was presented at the 29th Málaga Film Festival on 13 March 2026. Distributed by A Contracorriente Films, the film is scheduled to be released theatrically in Spain on 5 June 2026.

== See also ==
- List of Spanish films of 2026
