= Adela de la Torre de Lope =

Spanish politician

Adela de la Torre
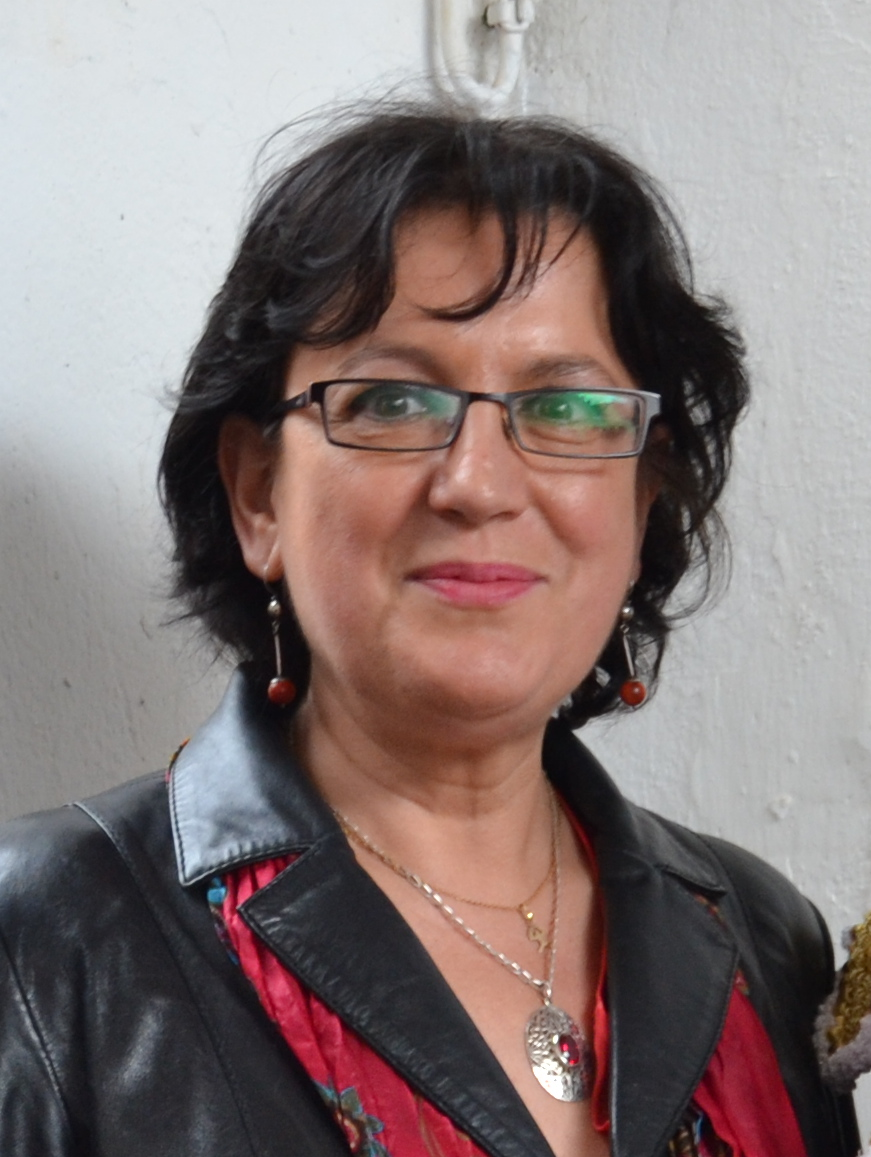

Mayor of Brihuega
- In office 16 June 2007 – 13 June 2015

Member of the Cortes of Castilla–La Mancha
- In office 15 December 2011 – 31 March 2015
- Preceded by: Antonio Román Jasanada
- Constituency: Guadalajara

Personal details
- Born: Cogollor-Brihuega, Spain
- Party: People's Party
- Occupation: Lawyer, university real estate expert, politician

Adela de la Torre de Lope is a Spanish lawyer and politician belonging to the People's Party. She served as member of the 8th Cortes of Castilla-La Mancha (2011–2015) as well as mayor of Brihuega (2007–2015).

== Biography ==
Born in Cogollor, she earned a licentiate degree in law. In her career, she specialised as real estate administrator.

She started in politics in 2007, as she stood first in the electoral list of the People's Party (PP) list vis-à-vis the 2007 Brihuega municipal election. She was invested as Mayor of Brihuega (the first female one in the history of the municipality) on 16 June 2007. She went on to command another mandate as mayor in 2011. She became a member of the regional legislature in representation of Guadalajara in December 2011, covering the vacant seat left by Antonio Román Jasanada. She was ousted from the municipal government after the 2015 municipal election, as an alliance of municipal councillors belonging to the Spanish Socialist Workers' Party and Ahora Brihuega invested Luis Viejo as new mayor on 13 June 2015, putting an end to 20 years of PP rule.
