= All in Favor =

- Theatrical release poster
- Spanish: Votemos
- Directed by: Santiago Requejo
- Screenplay by: Santiago Requejo
- Story by: Santiago Requejo; Javier Lorenzo; Raúl Barranco
- Produced by: David Naranjo; Gonzalo Gilsanz; Carlos Sanz; Santiago Requejo; Tono Escudero
- Starring: Clara Lago; Tito Valverde; Gonzalo de Castro; Raúl Fernández de Pablo; Neus Sanz; Christian Checa; Charo Reina; Pepe Carrasco
- Cinematography: Kiko de la Rica
- Edited by: Lucas Sánchez
- Music by: Morgana Acevedo
- Production companies: 02:59 Films; Pris & Batty; Votamos, AIE
- Distributed by: DeAPlaneta
- Release dates: 9 June 2025 (Kinépolis Paterna); 12 June 2025 (Spain)
- Country: Spain
- Language: Spanish

All in Favor (Spanish: Votemos, lit. 'let's vote') is a 2025 Spanish comedy-drama film directed by Santiago Requejo. Its ensemble cast features Clara Lago, Tito Valverde, Gonzalo de Castro, Raúl Fernández de Pablo, Neus Sanz, Christian Checa, and Charo Reina.

== Plot ==
Set in a building in the centre of Madrid, the plot tackles the prejudices of a neighborhood association revolting by news concerning the announced arrival of a new tenant with mental health issues.

== Cast ==
- Clara Lago as Nuria
- Tito Valverde as Fernando
- Gonzalo de Castro as Ricardo
- Raúl Fernández de Pablo as Alberto
- Neus Sanz as Maite
- Christian Checa as Lucas
- Charo Reina as Lola
- Pepe Carrasco as Joaquín

== Production ==
All in Favour is a full-length adaptation of Santiago Requejo's short film Votamos. The short film also spawned a stage version that premiered in Buenos Aires in April 2023. The film is a 02:59 Films and Pris & Batty Films production with support from the department of Culture of the Community of Madrid. It was shot in Madrid in September 2024.

== Release ==
The film was presented at Kinépolis Paterna on 9 June 2025. It was released theatrically in Spain by DeAPlaneta on 12 June 2025.

== See also ==
- List of Spanish films of 2025
