= DeAPlaneta =

Spanish film production and distribution company

DeAPlaneta S.L.

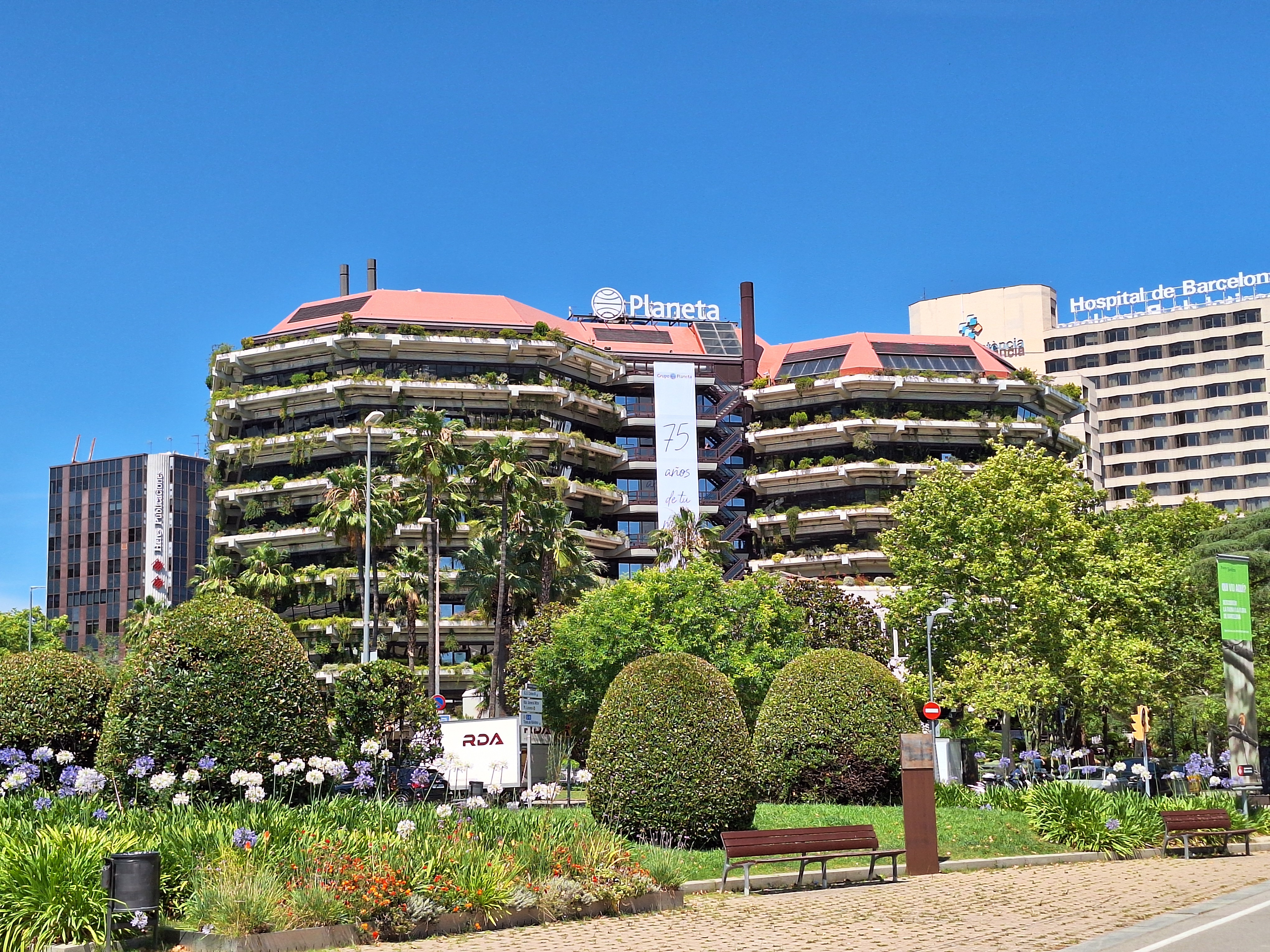
- DeAPlaneta offices in Barcelona
- Type: Sociedad limitada (S.L.)
- Industry: Entertainment
- Founded: 2000; 26 years ago
- Headquarters: Avda. Diagonal 662-664,, Barcelona, Catalonia, Spain
- Services: Film distribution; Film production; Television production; Television distribution
- Parent: Grupo Planeta; De Agostini

DeAPlaneta is an audiovisual production and distribution company based in Barcelona. It was created as the joint venture of Grupo Planeta and De Agostini.

== History ==
It opened in 2001 as a joint venture of Italian holding company DeAgostini and Spanish mass media holding Grupo Planeta with the initial intent of primarily focusing on the Spanish and Portuguese (Iberian) markets. Both groups had already joined forces with the publishing house Planeta DeAgostini. According to president Maurizio Carlotti, it was born out as a split from Planeta 2010. Upon the time of the company's rollout, its distribution arm in Spain included DeAPlaneta Home Video, Planeta Junior, Planeta D, while its production arm consisted of film production outfit Cometa PC and TV-movie production outfit Prodigius, a joint venture with Mediapro. In 2003, DeAPlaneta and Mikado created Argentinian production outfit KDM Films along with Oscar Kramer.

in April 2000 during the MIP-TV event, Planeta 2010, partnered with German childrens entertainment company EM.TV & Merchandising to expand the Junior brand into the Spain & Portugal territories announcing a joint venture production subsidiary to handle distribution of EM.TV's children's programming including those from the latter's Australian & American subsidiairies Yoram Gross-EM.TV and The Jim Henson Company in Spain and Portugal with Planeta 2010 and EM.TV forming a Madrid-based Spanish joint-venture home entertainment & distribution/production subsidiary entitled Planeta Junior, marking EM.TV's entry into the Spanish film & TV production industry. Their partnership would be extended one year later in March 2001, when Planeta 2010 formed an animation co-production partnership with German entertainment company EM.TV, under their joint-venture production subsidiary Planeta Junior to handle distribution to the then-upcoming shows from EM.TV such as Old Tom (which was produced by its Australian studio Yoram Gross-EM.TV) for the Spanish and Portuguese territories.

In March 2002, Planeta 2010 was rebranded into DeAPlaneta when its Spanish publishing parent Grupo Planeta had partnered with Italian publishing & video distribution company De Agostini to create a new traditional mulitplatform distribution company.

In December 2002 following the rebranding of Planeta 2010 to DeAPlaneta, DeAPlaneta had joined forces with Spanish mulitmedia & audiovisual company Mediapro to form a joint-venture TV movie production label called Prodigius Audiovisual to produce TV-movies with Jaume Santacana had been appointed to handle the joint-venture label Prodiguis Audiovisual via director.

In August 2004, DeAPlaneta and German media company EM.TV & Merchandising had expanded their joint venture production company Planeta Junior into Italy through Italian publishing company De Agostini.

In April 2006, the company announced the launch of an international sales division.

In March 2019, DeAPlaneta's subsidiary Planeta Junior announced the merging of its European operations into one production organisation with Planeta Junior will shift their focus into France.

In December 2021, DeAPlaneta and Planeta Junior announced the merging of the two companies including DeAPlaneta's division DeAPlaneta Kids & Families together into one production and distribution company by renaming DeAPlaneta into a new name called DeAPlaneta Entertainment as part of their strategic reorganisation with the rebranded company will focus on three genre cores

In January 2023, DeAPlaneta Entertainment acquired the film & television catalogue of Madrid-based Spanish animation production studio BRB Interactional in order for DeAPlaneta Entertainment to expand their children's entertainment portfolio.

In February 2025, DeAPlaneta Entertainment entered a European distribution and licensing partnership with American entertainment company The Jim Henson Company to handle several Henson's properties such as Fraggle Rock in European territories.

== Releases ==
Release date (Note: The listed date refers to the film's theatrical release in Spain by DeAPlaneta, not necessarily its first screening or when it premiered.)	Title	Director(s)	Ref.
26 January 2024	The Three Musketeers: Milady	Martin Bourboulon	
23 February 2024	Políticamente incorrectos	Arantxa Echevarría	
5 April 2024	Wicked Little Letters	Thea Sharrock	
19 April 2024	Civil War	Alex Garland	
17 May 2024	Disco, Ibiza, Locomía	Kike Maíllo	
3 July 2024	Boy Kills World	Moritz Mohr	
22 November 2024	Raqqa: Spy vs. Spy	Gerardo Herrero	
5 December 2024	¿Quién es quién?	Martín Cuervo	
20 December 2024	Conclave	Edward Berger	
1 January 2025	Heretic	Scott Beck, Bryan Woods	
21 February 2025	Goodrich	Hallie Meyers-Shyer	
12 June 2025	All in Favor	Santiago Requejo	
10 April 2026	An Island Away from You	Alexis Morante	
18 September 2026	Pressure	Anthony Maras	

== Television series ==
Title	Years	Network	Notes
Squish	2019–2020	Neox; Gulli & Canal J (France)	co-production with Cottonwood Media
Milo	2021–present	5 (United Kingdom)	co-production with Fourth Wall
Monster Shaker	2024–present	Clan TVE; Gulli & M6 (France); Ketnet (Belgium)	co-production with GO-N Productions and Umedia
Underdog	2025–present	Gulli & M6 (France); Rai Gulp (Italy)	co-production with Superprod Animation, Red Monk Studio and DreamWorks Classics; A reboot of the 1960s series by W. Watts Biggers
Karters	coming 2026	Cartoonito (EMEA)	co-production with Method Animation
Magic Lilly	TBA	Clan TVE & SX3; Super RTL (Germany)	co-production with B.Water Animation Studios and The Magic Lilly Company
Untitled Bernard reboot	TBA	TBA	co-production with Alpha Group
