= Who Is Who? =

- Theatrical release poster
- Spanish: ¿Quién es quién?
- Directed by: Martín Cuervo
- Screenplay by: Irene Niubó
- Based on: Le Sens de la famille by Jean-Patrick Benes, Allan Mauduit, and Martin Douaire, and Thibault Valetoux
- Produced by: Jaime Ortiz de Artiñano; Yolanda del Val; Ignacio Segura; Gonzalo Salazar-Simpson; Luis Ferrón
- Starring: Elena Irureta; Kira Miró; Salva Reina; Sofía Otero; Martí Cordero; Ana Jara
- Cinematography: Pablo Bürmann
- Edited by: Ángel Hernández Zoido
- Production companies: Atresmedia Cine; DeAPlaneta; Lazona Films; Lazona Producciones; Bruja del Este Films AIE
- Distributed by: DeAPlaneta
- Release date: 5 December 2024
- Country: Spain
- Language: Spanish

Who Is Who? (Spanish: ¿Quién es quién?) is a 2024 Spanish comedy film directed by Martín Cuervo from a screenplay written by Irene Niubó, based on the 2020 French film Le Sens de la famille. It stars Elena Irureta, Kira Miró, Salva Reina, Sofía Otero, Martí Cordero, and Ana Jara.

== Plot ==
The daily routine of the Fuentes, a dysfunctional family, is upended after the family's youngest member, Valentina, makes a wish for her ninth birthday, with the result of all family members swapping their bodies in the morning after.

== Cast ==
- Elena Irureta
- Kira Miró
- Salva Reina
- Sofía Otero
- Martí Cordero
- Ana Jara
- Gracia Olayo
- Aitor Luna
- Gonzalo de Castro
- Carlos Iglesias
- Carlos Areces
- Terelu Campos

== Production ==
The film was produced by DeAPlaneta, Atresmedia Cine, Lazona, and La Bruja del Este AIE, and it had the participation of Atresmedia, Movistar Plus+, and Netflix. Shooting locations included the Parque de Atracciones de Madrid.

== Release ==
Distributed by DeAPlaneta, the film was released theatrically in Spain on 5 December 2024.

== See also ==
- List of Spanish films of 2024
