= The Perfect Family =

The Perfect Family may refer to:

- The Perfect Family (2011 film), a comedy-drama film directed by Anne Renton
- The Perfect Family (2021 film), a Spanish comedy film directed by Arantxa Echevarría
- The Perfect Family (Flashpoint), an episode of Flashpoint
