= Irene Visedo =

Spanish actress

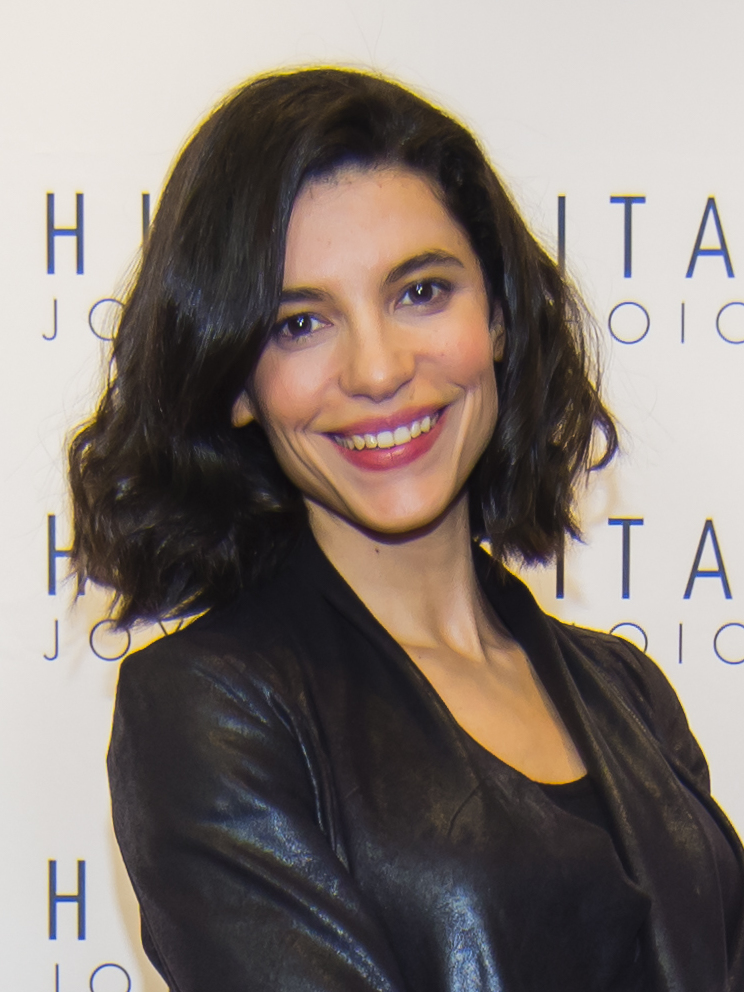
- (2010)
- Born: Irene Visedo Herrero; 16 July 1978 (age 48); Madrid, Spain
- Occupation: Actress

Irene Visedo Herrero (born 16 July 1978) is a Spanish actress who became popular in Spain for her performance as Inés Alcántara in the TV series Cuéntame cómo pasó.

== Biography ==
Born in Madrid on 16 July 1978. She started training as an actress when she was 14 years old, although her first chance at a feature film did not come until she was 18, with a performance in El ángel de la Guarda (1996).

Visedo's first leading role in a film came with Cascabel (2000), a coming-of-age story of two friends (Cascabel and Luz) who want to leave their past behind and succeed in the world of music. Her performance won her the Best New Actress Award at the Toulouse's Cinespaña Film Festival.

She starred in Guillermo del Toro's El Espinazo del Diablo (The Devil's Backbone), a 2001 Spanish-Mexican gothic horror film where she played Conchita, a young teacher. She also played the role of Mónica Erigaray in Los pasos perdidos (The Lost Steps), a Spanish-Argentine production also released in 2001.

Visedo joined the cast of the new drama series Cuéntame cómo pasó (originally set in 1968), aired on La 1 since 2001. She played the character of Inés Alcántara, the older sibling of the Alcántara family, a "nonconformist spirit" who originally worked as hairdresser. The role marked her artistic career and earned her popularity.

She starred together with Hugo Silva and María Valverde in El hombre de arena (2007), a love story set in an inverosimile location (a Francoist psychiatric hospital in Extremadura), and where she played the role of Carmen, a doctor seeking to reform the institution. In 2007, after more than one hundred episodes, Visedo decided to leave Cuéntame and to focus on her film career. Years later, in 2010, the vacant role of Inés Alcántara would be recast for Pilar Punzano, whom Visedo shares a reasonable physical resemblance and whom with Visedo had previously shared a leading role in Cascabel. (Note: In a 2008 special episode of Cuéntame, the character of Inés Alcántara had been already played by Marieta Orozco, although the actress did not show her face on-screen.) After her first spell in Cuéntame, Visedo appeared in the family film Carlitos y el campo de los sueños (2008), playing the role of Maite, a cook who helps the lead character, an orphan child who just dreams about having a family and playing football.

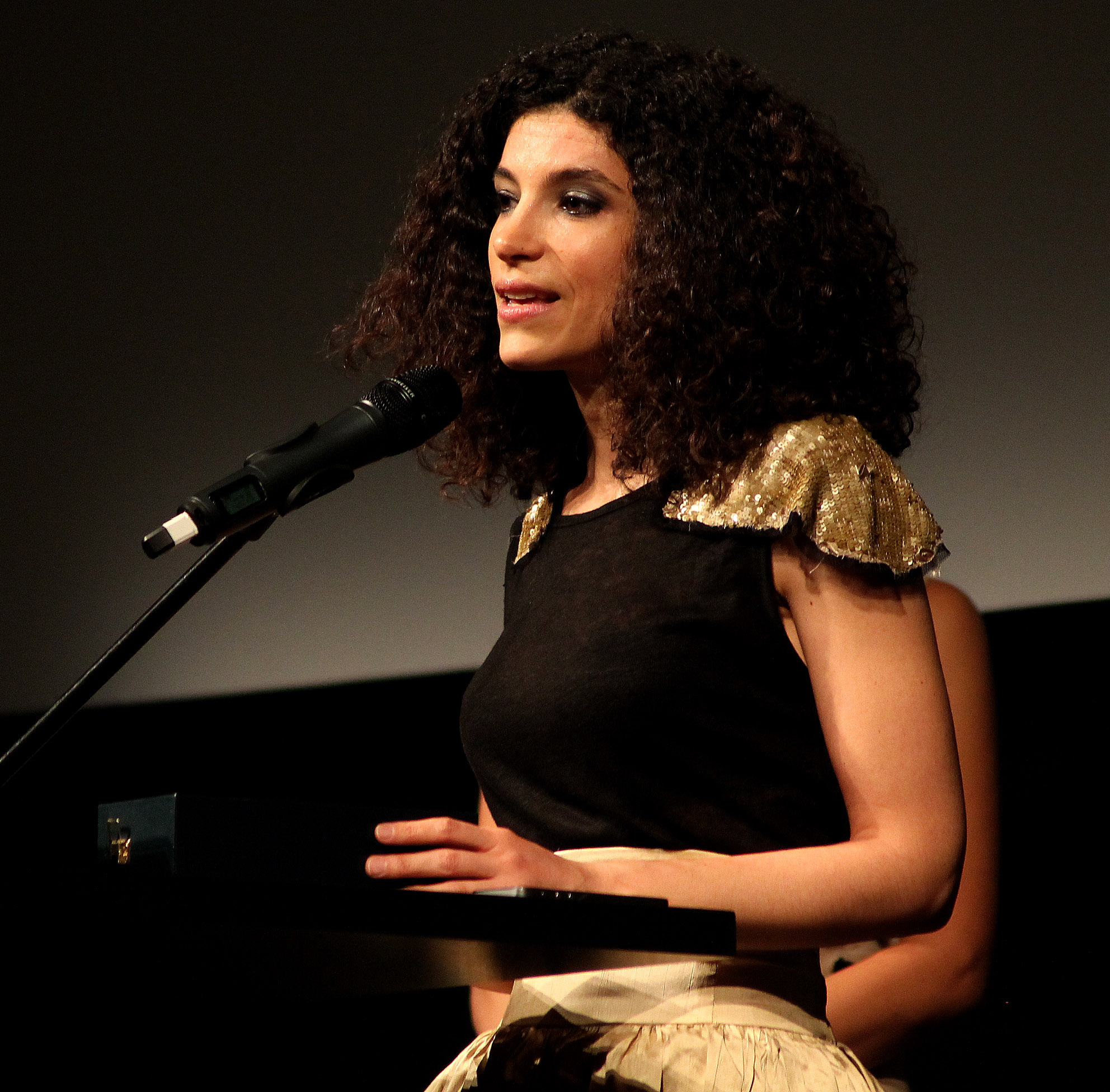
Visedo at the 59th Valladolid International Film Festival (2014)

Visedo also starred in La mujer del anarquista (The Anarchist's Wife), a romantic drama set in the Spanish Civil War and the Post-War period, where she played the adult version of Paloma (the child and teenage versions of Paloma were respectively played by Alba Barragán and Ivana Baquero). She also had a leading role in Los amores locos (2009), for which she won an award at the 14th Spanish Film Festival of Toulouse.

In 2010, she starred in La duquesa, a biopic miniseries where Visedo portrayed a young version of Cayetana Fitz-James Stuart (the older version of the Duchess of Alba was played by Adriana Ozores). She starred together with Gustavo Salmerón in the psychological thriller La Senda, were both performers play a troubled couple paying a visit to a remoted cabin in the woods in order to get their marriage back on track.

In 2015, after Pilar Punzano was not renewed in Cuéntame—not free from controversy and acrimonious crossed accusations between Punzano and the rest of the cast— Visedo was offered her former role as Inés Alcántara. She thus returned to the series, then at its 17th season, when the fiction was set in 1984.

== Filmography ==
Film

Year	Title	Role	Notes	Ref
2000	Cascabel	Cascabel		
2001	El Espinazo del Diablo (The Devil's Backbone)	Conchita		
2001	Los pasos perdidos (The Lost Steps)	Mónica Erigaray		
2007	El hombre de arena (The Sandman)	Carmen		
2008	Carlitos y el campo de los sueños	Maite		
2008	La mujer del anarquista (The Anarchist's Wife)	Paloma	Adult version of the character. Child and teenage versions played by Alba Barragán and Ivana Baquero	
2009	Amores locos (Mad Love)	Julia		
2012	La senda	Ana		

Television

Year	Title	Role	Notes	Ref
2001–2008; 2015–2021	Cuéntame cómo pasó	Inés Alcántara	The character was played between 2010 and 2015 by Pilar Punzano	
2010	La duquesa	Cayetana Fitz-James Stuart	TV Miniseries. Young version of the character. Mature version played by Adriana Ozores.	
