= The Perfect Family (2021 film) =

2021 film by Arantxa Echevarría

- Theatrical release poster
- Spanish: La familia perfecta
- Directed by: Arantxa Echevarría
- Written by: Olatz Arroyo
- Produced by: Jaime Ortiz de Artiñano; Gonzalo Salazar-Simpson; Mercedes Gamero
- Starring: Belén Rueda; José Coronado; Gonzalo de Castro; Pepa Aniorte; Carolina Yuste; Gonzalo Ramos; Jesús Vidal; Lalo Tenorio
- Cinematography: Pilar Sánchez Díaz
- Edited by: Renato Sanjuán
- Music by: Federico Jusid
- Production companies: Lazona Producciones; Atresmedia Cine; The Snake Films AIE
- Distributed by: Universal Pictures International Spain
- Release date: 3 December 2021
- Running time: 110 minutes
- Country: Spain
- Language: Spanish

The Perfect Family (Spanish: La familia perfecta) is a 2021 Spanish comedy film directed by Arantxa Echevarría and written by Olatz Arroyo. The cast features Belén Rueda, José Coronado, Gonzalo de Castro, Pepa Aniorte, Carolina Yuste, Gonzalo Ramos, Jesús Vidal and Lalo Tenorio.

== Plot ==
The plot features the clash between a well-off family and a working-class family in the wake of an unexpected wedding between Pablo and Sara set to link both families, putting the world of Lucía (the privileged groom's mother) upside down.

== Cast ==
- Belén Rueda as Lucía
- Carolina Yuste as Sara
- José Coronado as Miguel
- Pepa Aniorte as Amparo
- Gonzalo de Castro as Ernesto
- Gonzalo Ramos as Pablo
- Lalo Tenorio as Toni
- Jesús Vidal as Don Custodio
- Pepe Ocio as Miguel Ángel
- María Hervás as Olmedo

== Production ==
The film was directed by Arantxa Echevarría whereas the screenplay was penned by Olatz Arroyo. Produced by Lazona Producciones, Atresmedia Cine and The Snake Films AIE, with the participation of Atresmedia and Canal Cosmopolitan Iberia and funding from the ICAA, it was shot in 2020 in locations of Madrid, Rascafría, Guadarrama and Brihuega. Shooting wrapped in Madrid after seven weeks by October 2020.

== Release ==
The film was theatrically released in Spain on 3 December 2021 by Universal Pictures International Spain.

== Reception ==
Reviewing for Cinemanía, Rubén Romero Santos gave the film 3 out of 5 stars, considering that, some plot licenses notwithstanding, it is an "estimable comedy about female empowerment" with the bonus of a steadycam managed with a "virtuosity" unusual in that sort of films.

Raquel Hernández Luján of HobbyConsolas gave it 72 points ("good"), deeming it to be a "fun film", praising the developments around Rueda's character, while considering that some secondary characters could have been removed.

In El Periódico de Catalunya, Beatriz Martínez rated the film with 3 out of 5 stars, deeming it to be a "competent" mainstream product which, commonplaces and plot cliches notwithstanding, is endowed with a sensibility removed from conventionalisms when approaching the characters, particularly the female ones.

Miguel Anxo Fernández of La Voz de Galicia highlighted Rueda's performance, also writing that the film confirms director Arantxa Echevarría as a consolidated value, while noting that the comedy features a tendency to absurdity which may put viewers off at certain moments, reasoning that a degree of "restraint" would have benefited the film.

== See also ==
- List of Spanish films of 2021
