= The Furies (2016 film) =

- Theatrical release poster
- Spanish: Las furias
- Directed by: Miguel del Arco
- Written by: Miguel del Arco
- Starring: Pere Arquillué; Gonzalo de Castro; Elisabet Gelabert; Bárbara Lennie; Carmen Machi; José Sacristán; Mercedes Sampietro; Alberto San Juan; Macarena Sanz; Emma Suárez
- Cinematography: Raquel Fernández
- Edited by: Teresa Font
- Music by: Arnau Vilà
- Production companies: Aquí y Allí Films; Kamikaze Producciones
- Distributed by: Wanda Vision
- Release dates: 23 October 2016 (Seminci); 11 November 2016 (Spain)
- Country: Spain
- Language: Spanish

The Furies (Spanish: Las furias) is a 2016 family comedy-drama film with tragedy elements written and directed by Miguel del Arco. The ensemble cast features Pere Arquillué, Gonzalo de Castro, Elisabet Gelabert, Bárbara Lennie, Carmen Machi, José Sacristán, Mercedes Sampietro, Alberto San Juan, Macarena Sanz and Emma Suárez.

== Plot ==
Marga, the matriarch of the Ponte Alegre family, is set to sell the family's summer house, so she encourages their three children to go there to choose as many items as they wish to preserve.

== Cast ==
- Pere Arquillué as Gus
- Gonzalo de Castro as Héctor
- Elisabet Gelabert as Nekane
- Bárbara Lennie as Julia
- Carmen Machi as Casandra
- José Sacristán as Leo
- Mercedes Sampietro as Marga
- Alberto San Juan as Aki
- Macarena Sanz as María
- Emma Suárez as Ana

== Production ==
The film, Miguel del Arco's debut feature, is an Aquí y Allí Films and Kamikaze Producciones production, with participation of TVE and Movistar+. It had a €1.5 million budget. Filming began on 10 August 2015. Shooting locations included the seaside town of Suances, Cantabria.

== Release ==
The Furies was presented at the 61st Valladolid International Film Festival (Seminci) on 23 October 2016, screened as the festival's opening film. Distributed by Wanda Vision, the film was theatrically released in Spain on 11 November 2016.

== Reception ==
Jordi Costa of Fotogramas, rated the film 4 out of 5 stars, considering that "the presentation of characters and conflicts is absolutely exemplary", likewise citing the harmony between director and cast as a positive point, while warning that some viewers "will get indigestion from the final excesses".

Sergio F. Pinilla of Cinemanía rated it 3½ out of 5 stars, writing that the film, dialogue-wise, "is too intense", featuring a not quite fitting climax, standing out for "its narrative and stylistic eloquence". He found a likeness with films by Sam Mendes, P.T. Anderson and Woody Allen.

Quim Casas of El Periódico de Catalunya scored 2 out of 5 stars, considering that some of the characters "are more interesting in theory than in practice", wondering if perhaps there was no need for such stridency, concluding that "excess eventually devours intensity".

== Accolades ==
Year	Award	Category	Nominee(s)	Result	Ref.
2017	72nd CEC Medals	Best New Actress	Macarena Sanz	Nominated	
2017	26th Actors and Actresses Union Awards	Best Film Actress in a Minor Role	Emma Suárez	Nominated	

== See also ==
- List of Spanish films of 2016
