= Doctor Mateo =

Spanish television series

- Created by: Dominic Minghella
- Starring: Gonzalo de Castro; Natalia Verbeke; Rosario Pardo; Daniel Freire; Esperanza Pedreño; Álex O'Dogherty; Lulú Palomares; Ricardo de Barreiro; Gonzalo Kindelán; Ramón Pujol; Ángela Moreno; Rodrigo Castellanos; María Esteve; Xisco Segura; Lluís Villanueva; Xavi Mira
- Theme music composer: Zeno and the stoics
- Country of origin: Spain
- No. of series: 5
- No. of episodes: 54

Production
- Producer: César Rodríguez Blanco
- Running time: 70 minutes

Original release
- Network: Antena 3
- Release: February 22, 2009 – July 17, 2011

Doctor Mateo is a Spanish television comedy drama produced by Notro Films for Antena 3. It is an adaptation of the British series Doc Martin, created by Dominic Minghella.

== Characters ==
- Mateo Sancristobal (Gonzalo de Castro)

Mateo is a doctor who was living in New York City until he started suffering from hemophobia. He is always in a very bad mood. Despite his apparently aggressive personality, he is a very naîve man; in fact, he evidently has Asperger syndrome. Mateo, after leaving the hospital where he was working in NY, arrives at a little village in the province of Asturias in the north of Spain, called San Martín del Sella, where he lived when he was a child. There he meets the village's inhabitants and discovers that there is always something interesting happening.

- Adriana Pozuelo (Natalia Verbeke)

Adriana is the teacher at the school in San Martin del Sella. She's a very good person with a sharp sense of justice and morality. She falls in love with Mateo but she doesn't know how to catch his attention.

- Elena (María Esteve)

Helena is the baker of the village. She's the mother of a son whose father is Carol's husband, with whom she had an affair. She's neurotic and a hypochondriac, and she's close friend of Adriana and Carol.

- Carol (Lulú Palomares)

Carol is the owner of the publicly founded radio station of San Martín del Sella. She is very interested in the life of her neighbours in the village and always tends to get involved in their life and problems, In fact, all the village's gossips are broadcast on her radio show. Carol is married to Mario, who is the father of Elena's son. Carol is friends with Adriana and Helena.

- Alfredo Escobar (Alex O'Dogherty)

Alfredo is the village's policeman. He is a simple-minded and good-hearted person. He falls in love very easily, but he's very unsure of himself because of an affair he had before that ended sadly. He loves his work, and his motto is: "The rules are the rules and they must be obeyed". He fell in love with Elena and now lives with her and her son.

- Mario (Xavi Mira)

Mario is Carol's husband. He loves his wife and always looks after her. He is sometimes frightened by Carol's strong personality and gossiping. He previously worked in a bank, but now he's unemployed and has decided to open a hairdressing salon, his ambition from childhood. Ten years before he had an affair with Elena with whom he had a child, but he didn't know that.

- Aunt Juana (Rosario Pardo)

Juana is the Mateo's aunt. She has always lived all alone without anyone in her life. When Mateo arrived to San Martín, she helped him to get integrated with the neighbours. She is her nephew's closest confident and doesn't need words to communicate with him; in fact, she protects Mateo and loves him as if he were her son. She entered into a marriage of convenience with a Nigerian sailor who is trying to help.

- Tom Pellegrini (Daniel Freire)

Tom is the Argentinian owner of the village tavern. He was the singer of a Rock band called "Metro y los politanos", but his career came to an end and now he lives in San Martin. He is nostalgic about his music career, and the tavern is filled with the memories of past success. Recently his son David came to live in the village.

- David Pellegrini (Elio Gonzalez)

David is Tom's son. He lived in Madrid, but decided to move to San Martin del Sella to learn about his past. His relationship with his father was really hard because he felt alone when their parents divorced; this fact made him a very mature person. Anyway, they start getting emotionally closer.

- Ana (Ángela Moreno)

Ana works as a waitress in the tavern of the village. She's shy, very unsure of herself, and a compulsive money saver, to the point that her friends think that she's a banker. Although she's a very good person, she can get incredibly angry. Ana is in love with Riqui, with whom she wants to make a world tour.

- Riqui (Gonzalo Kindelan)

Riqui is the waiter of Tom's tavern. He works both in the tavern and as a sound assistant at Carol's radio station. He is a very good-looking boy with whom all the girls of the village would love to have an affair. He falls in love with Ana but their relationship tends to be a bit turbulent.
