= The Sandman (2007 film) =

- Theatrical release poster
- Spanish: El hombre de arena
- Directed by: José Manuel González-Berbel
- Screenplay by: José Manuel González-Berbel
- Starring: Hugo Silva; María Valverde; Irene Visedo; Alberto Jiménez; Samuel Le Bihan; Héctor Noas; Miguel de Lira; Mercedes Sampietro; Gabrielle Lazure; Ana Torrent; Silvia Marty
- Cinematography: Antonio González Méndez
- Music by: Cristina Pato
- Production companies: Iroko Films; Adivina Producciones; Las siete sillas
- Distributed by: Sony Pictures Releasing de España
- Release date: 9 November 2007 (Spain)
- Country: Spain
- Language: Spanish

The Sandman (Spanish: El hombre de arena) is a 2007 Spanish romantic drama film directed by José Manuel González-Berbel (in his directorial debut feature) which stars Hugo Silva and María Valverde. The plot is set in a Francoist psychiatric hospital.

== Plot ==
After being interned into a psychiatric ward in Extremadura in the late 1960s, free-spirit Mateo changes the lives of the inmates in the asylum, including Lola's.

== Cast ==
- Hugo Silva as Mateo
- María Valverde as Lola
- Irene Visedo as Carmen
- Mercedes Sampietro as Carmen mayor
- Ana Torrent as María la Cigarrona
- Alberto Jiménez as Burgos
- Samuel Le Bihan as El francés
- Héctor Noas as Luis
- Miguel de Lira as Joao
- Ana Ruiz as Silvia
- Gabrielle Lazure as Gabrielle
- Silvia Marty as Emilia

== Production ==
The film was produced by Iroko Films, Adivina Producciones, and Las siete sillas. Shooting locations included Salvaleón, Mérida, Badajoz, and Barcarrota.

== Release ==
The film screened at the 1st Tangier-Málaga Spanish Film Festival. Distributed by Sony Pictures, it was released theatrically in Spain on 9 November 2007.

== Reception ==
Javier Cortijo of ABC assessed that the love story side of the film is weighed down by the [leading] actors, whilst supporting cast members (Jiménez and Visedo, together with Torrent's brief appearance) manage to uplift the whole to a certain extent.

Alberto Luchini of El Mundo considered that, well-achieved atmosphere notwithstanding, the screenplay is a mess, with "what was supposed to be moving ends up provoking indifference".

== See also ==
- List of Spanish films of 2007
