= Nasdrovia =

Spanish comedy thriller television series

- Genre: Comedy; Thriller
- Created by: Miguel Esteban; Luismi Pérez; Sergio Sarria
- Based on: El hombre que odiaba a Paulo Coelho by Sergio Sarria
- Directed by: Marc Vigil
- Starring: Leonor Watling; Hugo Silva
- Country of origin: Spain
- Original language: Spanish
- No. of seasons: 1
- No. of episodes: 6

Production
- Running time: 30 min (approx.)
- Production companies: Movistar+; Globomedia

Original release
- Network: Movistar+
- Release: 6 November 2020

Nasdrovia is a Spanish comedy thriller television series created by Miguel Esteban, Luismi Pérez and Sergio Sarria, which stars Leonor Watling and Hugo Silva. Its first season aired on Movistar+ in 2020.

== Premise ==
The story follows two lawyers, Edurne (Leonor Watling) and Julián (Hugo Silva) - business partners and former spouses both suffering from a midlife crisis - who decide to make a change in their lives and open a restaurant, operated by Franky (Luis Bermejo). It soon becomes the favourite of Boris (Anton Yakovlev), and thus the characters become embroiled in a relationship with the Russian mafia in Madrid.

== Cast ==
- Leonor Watling as Edurne.
- Hugo Silva as Julián.
- Luis Bermejo as Franky.
- Anton Yakovlev as Boris.
- Mark Ivanir as Aleksei.
- Michael John Treanor as Sergei.
- Yan Tual as Vasilli.
- Kevin Brand as Yuri.

== Production and release ==
Nasdrovia is based on the 2016 novel El hombre que odiaba a Paulo Coelho (transl. "The Man Who Hated Paulo Coelho"), by Sergio Sarria. The series is produced by Movistar+ in collaboration with Globomedia (The Mediapro Studio).

Created by Miguel Esteban, Luismi Pérez and Sergio Sarria, and directed by Marc Vigil, the first season consisted of 6 episodes with a running time of around 30 minutes. Filming took place in Madrid, Spain in the summer of 2019. The series premiered on Movistar+ on 6 November 2020, with two episodes airing per week. In December 2020, Movistar+ announced the show would be renewed for a second season. Filming started in March 2021 in Bulgaria (which was used to portray the setting in Russia) and wrapped in April 2021. Shooting locations in Spain included Madrid and Avilés (Asturias).

| Series | Episodes | Originally released | | | Ref. |
| Series | Episodes | First released | Last released | Network | Ref. |
|---|---|---|---|---|---|
| 1 | 6 | 6 November 2020 | 20 November 2020 | Movistar+ | |

| No. overall | No. in season | Title | Directed by | Original release date |
|---|---|---|---|---|
| 1 | 1 | "Zapoi" | Marc Vigil | 6 November 2020 |
| 2 | 2 | "Tkachenko" | Marc Vigil | 6 November 2020 |
| 3 | 3 | "Proklyataya suka" | Marc Vigil | 13 November 2020 |
| 4 | 4 | "Babuska" | Marc Vigil | 13 November 2020 |
| 5 | 5 | "Politsiya" | Marc Vigil | 20 November 2020 |
| 6 | 6 | "Vor V Zakone" | Marc Vigil | 20 November 2020 |

== Awards and nominations ==
| Year | Award | Category | Nominee(s) | Result | Ref. |
|---|---|---|---|---|---|
| 2021 | 8th Premios Feroz | Best Comedy Series | | Nominated | |
