= Políticamente incorrectos =

- Film poster
- Spanish: Políticamente incorrectos
- Directed by: Arantxa Echevarría
- Written by: Olatz Arroyo
- Produced by: Jaime Ortiz de Artiñano; Gonzalo Salazar-Simpson
- Starring: Adriana Torrebejano; Juanlu González; Gonzalo de Castro; Elena Irureta; María Hervás; Raúl Cimas; Pepa Aniorte
- Cinematography: Pilar Sánchez Díaz
- Edited by: Renato Sanjuán
- Music by: Marina Herlop
- Production companies: Lazona; Atresmedia Cine; Espantapajaros Films AIE
- Distributed by: DeAPlaneta
- Release date: 23 February 2024
- Country: Spain
- Language: Spanish

Políticamente incorrectos is a 2024 Spanish comedy film directed by Arantxa Echevarría, written by Olatz Arroyo, and starring Adriana Torrebejano and Juanlu González, alongside Gonzalo de Castro, Elena Irureta, María Hervás, Raúl Cimas, and Pepa Aniorte.

== Plot ==
Set against the backdrop of a politically polarised Spain, the plot follows progressive online communications manager Laura, working for 'Nueva Izquierda' leader Alfonso Bravo and rookie political aid Pablo, working for 'España Liberal' leader Victoria Silvela. Laura and Pablo are both placed second in the electoral list of their respective parties for the upcoming election, and an attraction to each other pops up in the aftermath of a helicopter incident.

== Cast ==
- Adriana Torrebejano as Laura
- Juanlu González as Pablo
- Gonzalo de Castro as Alfonso Bravo
- Elena Irureta as Victoria Silvela
- María Hervás as Lourdes
- Raúl Cimas as Hernando
- Pepa Aniorte as Cristina

== Production ==
The film is a Lazona, Atresmedia Cine, and Espantapajaros Films AIE production, and it had the participation of Atresmedia and Netflix, funding from ICAA and backing from Ayuntamiento de Madrid. Cinematographer Pilar Sánchez shot the film with Arri Alexa 35 cameras and Hawk V-Lite anamorphic lenses.

== Release ==
Distributed by DeAPlaneta, the film is scheduled to be released theatrically in Spain on 23 February 2024.

== Reception ==
Sergio F. Pinilla of Cinemanía rated the film 3 out of 5 stars, deeming it to boast "quite amusement and cast chemistry, but no bite" in the verdict.

Juan Pando of Fotogramas rated the film 3 out of 5 stars assessing that "the result is fun; the production is careful; [and] the humor is not always subtle but effective", while citing that the film could have used a higher degree of nastiness as a negative point.

== See also ==
- List of Spanish films of 2024
