= Church of la Virgen de la Asunción (Romancos) =

- Iglesia Parroquial de la Virgen de la Asunción (Romancos) (Spanish)
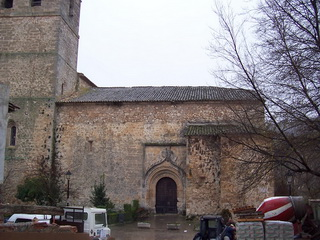

- Location within Spain
- 40.686944°N 2.884167°W
- Location: Romancos, Brihuega, Spain

Spanish Cultural Heritage
- Official name: Iglesia Parroquial de la Virgen de la Asunción (Romancos)
- Type: Non-movable
- Criteria: Monument
- Designated: 1990
- Reference no.: RI-51-0007005

The Church of la Virgen de la Asunción (Spanish: Iglesia Parroquial de la Virgen de la Asunción (Romancos)) is a church located in Romancos, Brihuega, Spain. It was declared Bien de Interés Cultural in 1990.

The church was built in the late 15th and early 16th centuries in a late-Gothic style, designated Isabelino.
