= Cuatro paredes =

- Theatrical release poster
- Directed by: Ibon Cormenzana
- Screenplay by: Roger Danès; Alfred Pérez-Fargas; Ibon Cormenzana; Manuela Vellés
- Produced by: Ibon Cormenzana
- Starring: Manuela Vellés; Sofía Otero; Roberto Álamo; Elena Irureta; Ramón Barea; Constanza Gallego
- Cinematography: Alejo Levis
- Music by: Aitor Etxebarria
- Production companies: Mundo Cero Crea; Mundo Cero Bat AIE
- Distributed by: A Contracorriente Films
- Release dates: 25 April 2025 (BCN Film Fest); 6 June 2025 (Spain)
- Running time: 82 minutes
- Country: Spain
- Language: Spanish

Cuatro paredes (transl. 'Four walls') is a 2025 Spanish drama film directed by Ibon Cormenzana. It stars Sofía Otero and Manuela Vellés.

== Plot ==
After the death of her father, 10-year-old Sofía faces the prospect of material deprivation. Her mother Juana tries to protect her while Sofía seeks refuge in theatre.

== Cast ==
- Sofía Otero as Sofía
- Manuela Vellés as Juana
- Roberto Álamo as Arturo
- Elena Irureta
- Ramón Barea

== Production ==
The film is a Mundo Cero Crea and Mundo Cero Bat AIE production with the collaboration of Save the Children's 'Impulsa' programme. It was shot in 2023 in Biscay. Filming locations included Orduña.

== Release ==
The film premiered in the official selection of the 9th BCN Film Fest on 25 April 2025. Distributed by A Contracorriente Films, it was released theatrically in Spain on 6 June 2025.

== Reception ==
Carlos Marañón of Cinemanía rated Cuatro paredes 3 out of 5 stars, declaring it a film "as simple as it is moving".

== See also ==
- List of Spanish films of 2025
