= Hugo Silva (actor) =

Spanish actor (born 1977)

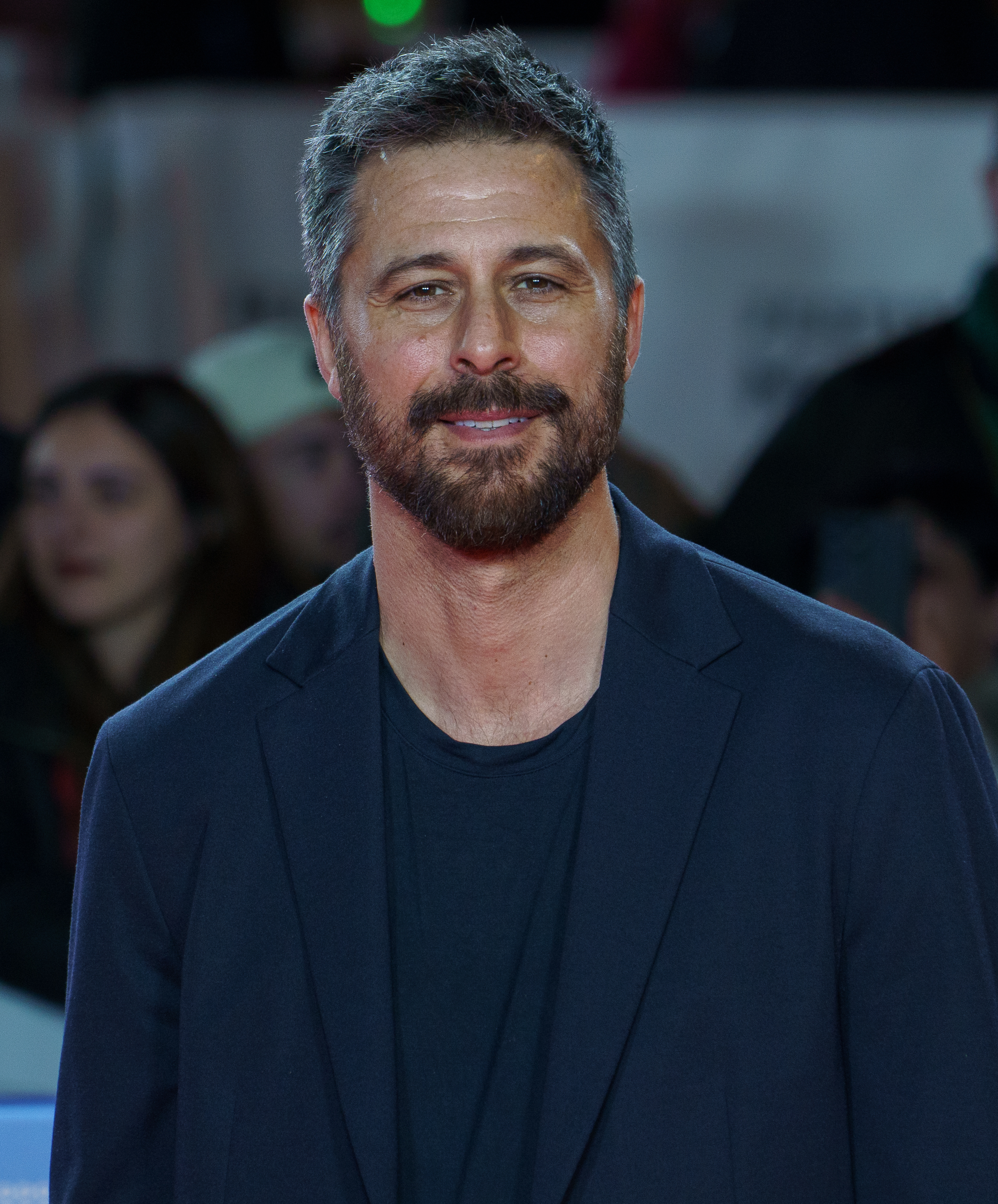
- Silva in 2025
- Born: Rafael Hugo Fernández Silva; 10 May 1977 (age 49); Madrid, Spain
- Occupation: Actor
- Years active: 1993–present

Rafael Hugo Fernández Silva (born 10 May 1977) is a Spanish actor. He attained notoriety for his portrayal of vulgar cop Lucas in television series Los hombres de Paco from 2005 to 2009.

== Early life ==
Rafael Hugo Fernández Silva was born in Madrid on 10 May 1977. He was raised in the district of San Blas. He began working as an electrician but, with his mother's encouragement, soon decided to try to be an actor. He began training in the RESAD (Real Escuela Superior de Arte Dramatico, Spain's oldest school of theater), while continuing with his vocal and guitar studies. He also joined a band called INORDEM.

== Career ==
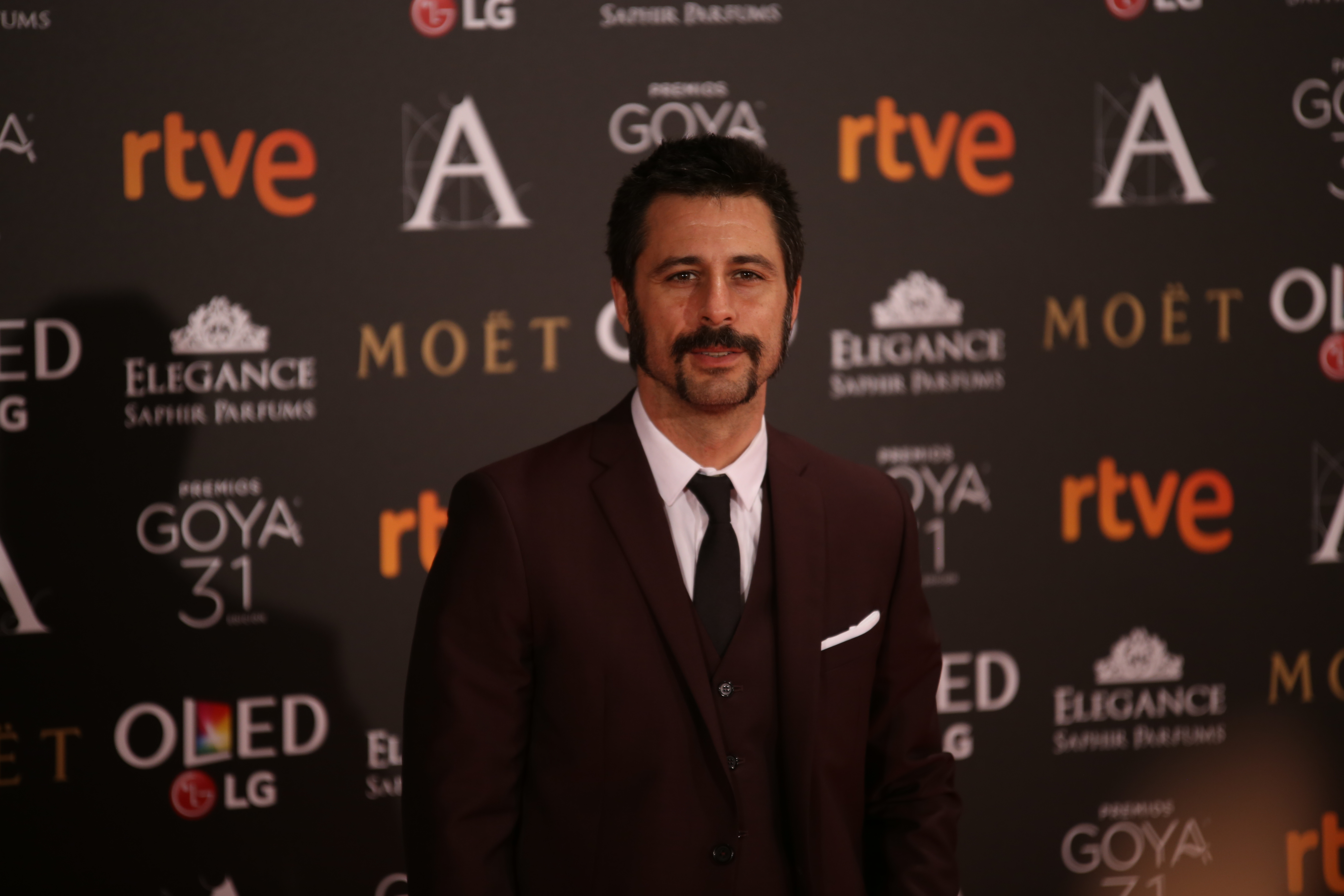
Silva attending the 31st Goya Awards in 2017

In the late 1990s, he had the opportunity to participate in the Spanish television program Crónicas marcianas, helping him obtain some recognition. He was then given a leading role hit television series Al salir de clase, based on the lives of Spanish high school students.

Silva made his feature film debut in Miserable Life (2000).

In 2005, after having played a role in the unsuccessful Paco y Veva, Hugo Silva was cast as Lucas Fernández in on Los Hombres de Paco, a show that averages nearly 4 million viewers per episode. In 2007 played the protagonist Mateo of critically acclaimed El Hombre de Arena.

In 2016 he joined the cast of El ministerio del tiempo.

In April 2025, he wrapped shooting the satire A Sucker's Born Every Minute directed by Arantxa Echevarría, portraying the protagonist, a man at a low ebb after a past popularity as a talent show celebrity. He described the character as "a very childlike and positive guy, and he always sees the bright side of life".

== Filmography ==
=== Film ===
Year	Title	Role	Notes	Ref.
2000	Terca vida (Miserable Life)		Feature film debut	
2003	Ladies' Night	Dago		
2004	Reinas (Queens)	Jonás		
2007	El hombre de arena (The Sandman)	Mateo		
2009	Agallas (Guts)	Sebas		
2009	Mentiras y gordas (Sex, Party and Lies)	Carlos		
2010	Que se mueran los feos (To Hell with the Ugly)	Román		
2011	En fuera de juego (Offside)	Hugo		
2011	Lo contrario al amor (The Opposite of Love)	Raúl		
2012	El cuerpo (The Body)	Álex Ulloa		
2013	Las brujas de Zugarramurdi (Witching & Bitching)	Jose		
2013	Los amantes pasajeros (I'm So Excited)	Benito Morón		
2014	Dioses y perros	Pasca		
2014	Musarañas (Shrew's Nest)	Carlos		
2015	Mi gran noche (My Big Night)	Roberto		
2016	Tenemos que hablar (We Need to Talk)	Jorge		
2016	El hilo rojo	Bruno		
2016	En tu cabeza	Mateo		
2017	El intercambio	Máximo		
2017	Solo se vive una vez (You Only Live Once)	Harken		
2017	Despido procedente	Sam		
2018	70 binladens (70 Big Ones)	Jonan		
2019	Sordo (The Silent War)	Vicente Roig		
2022	Un novio para mi mujer (A Boyfriend for My Wife)	Cuervo Flores		
2023	Un amor	Piter		
2023	Faro (Restless Waters, Shivering Lights)	Pablo		
2024	Buscando a Coque (Idol Affair)	César		
2024	Desmontando a Lucía (Guilty Attraction)	Simón		
2025	La buena suerte (The Good Luck)	Pablo		
2025	Un hijo (A Son)	Manuel		
2026	Cada día nace un listo (A Sucker's Born Every Minute)	Toni Lomas		

=== Television ===
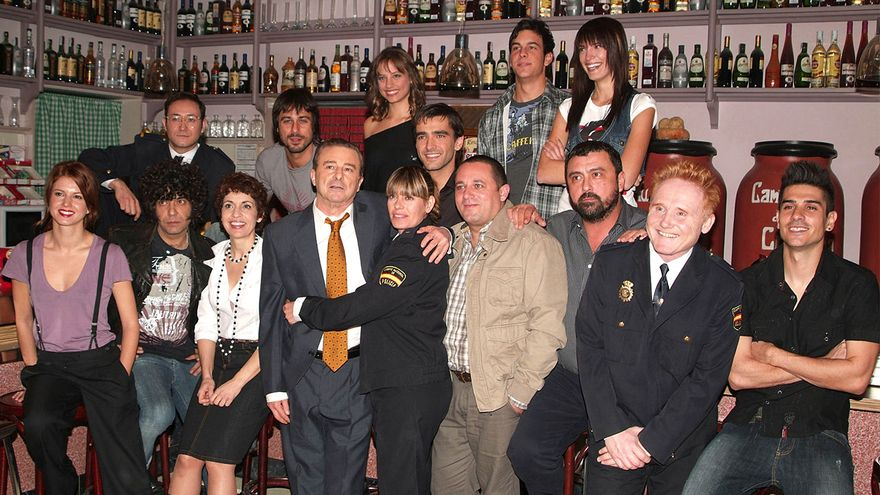
Silva (the second from the left in the back row) along with other cast members in the set of Los hombres de Paco

Title	Year	Role	Notes	Ref.
Coming Out of Class	2000	Guillermo Sierra	(TV; 2000–01) Al salir del clase	
The Commissioner	2002	Chema / Sebastián Alfaro	(TV; 2002–03) El comisario	
Paco and Veva	2004	Paco	(TV) Paco y Veva	
Los hombres de Paco	2005	Lucas Fernández	(TV; 2005–09; 2021); Nominated—Fotogramas de Plata for Best Television Actor	
Karabudjan	2010	Diego Salgado	(TV)	
The Princess of Éboli	2010	Antonio Pérez	(TV Film) La princesa de Éboli	
El corazón del océano	2011	Juan de Salazar		
Los nuestros	2015	Alberto Sánchez	TV	
El ministerio del tiempo	2016	Jesús Méndez, "Pacino"	(TV)	
Brigada Costa del Sol	2019	Bruno López	(TV)	
Nasdrovia	2020	Julián	(TV)	
La cocinera de Castamar	2021	Enrique de Arcona, Marquis of Soto and Campomedina	(TV)	
Top Boy	2022	Emilio	(TV) Series 4	
Marbella	2024–26	César Beltrán		

== Stage credits ==
- Hibrit (1993)
- Les liaisons dangereuses (1995)
- Toni in Atraco a las tres (2001–2002)
- Claudio in Hamlet (2009)

== Accolades ==
Year	Award	Category	Nominated work	Result	Ref.
2008	Fotogramas de Plata	Best Television Actor	Los hombres de Paco	Nominated	
2009	Fotogramas de Plata	Best Film Actor	The Sandman	Nominated	
2011	Fotogramas de Plata	Best Film Actor	Sex, Parties and Lies	Nominated	
2014	1st Feroz Awards	Best Actor in a Film	Witching & Bitching	Nominated	
2017	4th Feroz Awards	Best Supporting Actor in a Television Series	El ministerio del tiempo	Won	
2018	5th Feroz Awards	Best Actor in a Television Series	El ministerio del tiempo	Nominated	
2023	31st Actors and Actresses Union Awards	Best Actor in an International Production	Top Boy	Nominated	
2024	11th Feroz Awards	Best Supporting Actor in a Film	Un amor	Nominated	
2024	16th Gaudí Awards	Best Supporting Actor	Un amor	Nominated	
2024	38th Goya Awards	Best Supporting Actor	Un amor	Nominated	
2024	32nd Actors and Actresses Union Awards	Best Film Actor in a Secondary Role	Un amor	Nominated	
