= Under Your Feet =

- Theatrical release poster
- Spanish: Bajo tus pies
- Directed by: Cristian Bernard
- Screenplay by: Cristian Bernard; Ana Villar
- Produced by: Carlos Juárez; Guido Rud
- Starring: Maribel Verdú; Sofía Otero; Ibai Atanes; Urko Olazabal; Sandra Ferrús; Zorion Eguileor
- Cinematography: Juan Sebastián Vásquez
- Edited by: Paula Manzone
- Music by: Sergio Figueroa; Tomás Leonhardt
- Production companies: Basque Films; Nudista AIE
- Distributed by: VerCine
- Release dates: November 2025 (PÖFF); 6 May 2026 (Spain)
- Running time: 93 minutes
- Country: Spain
- Language: Spanish

Under Your Feet (Spanish: Bajo tus pies) is a 2025 psychological horror thriller film directed by Cristian Bernard. It star Maribel Verdú, Sofía Otero, and Ibai Atanes.

== Plot ==
Seeking for a reset, psychotherapist Isabel moves with her two children to an apartment in Bilbao with an affordable rent and a peculiar admission process, but three elder neighbors start to disturb them.

== Cast ==
- Maribel Verdú as Isabel
- Sofía Otero
- Ibai Atanes
- Urko Olazabal
- Sandra Ferrús
- Zorion Eguileor

== Production ==
The film was produced by Basque Films and Nudista AIE, and it had the participation of Netflix and RTVE. It was fully shot in Bilbao.

== Release ==
The film had its world premiere at the 27th Tallinn Black Nights Film Festival (PÖFF) in November 2025. Distributed by VerCine, it was released theatrically in Spain on 8 May 2026. FilmSharks also sold the film in Russia and other CIS countries (Nashe Kino) and Korea (Entermode) ahead of the 2026 European Film Market.

== Reception ==
In a negative 1-star rating, Manuel J. Lombardo of Diario de Sevilla judged that it is "best to avoid" the film, "if only out of respect for truly trashy horror films".

Raquel Hernández Luján of HobbyConsolas gave the film a 30-point score, lamenting that the film is not up to its cast, otherwise negatively assessing moments of unintended comedy, how it fails at "creating any sense of fear" and "makes such clumsy use of cinematic language".

Quim Casas of El Periódico de Catalunya gave the film 2 stars, writing that the story "has too many ups and downs and repetitions" and that, "never quite plunging into madness", "its plot twists are predictable".

Carmen L. Lobo of La Razón gave Under Your Feet a 3-star rating, highlighting the "great" Maribel Verdú as its best thing, while noting that it is a "quite uneven" film and its ending is "very rushed".

== See also ==
- List of Spanish films of 2026
