= Toda la suerte del mundo =

- Directed by: Esther Ortega
- Written by: Esther Ortega
- Starring: Sofía Otero; Carolina Yuste; Jaime Lorente; David Verdaguer; Fer Fraga; Antonio Molero; Óscar de la Fuente; Ignacio Mateos
- Production companies: AF Films; Match Point
- Release date: 2027
- Countries: Spain; Mexico
- Language: Spanish

Toda la suerte del mundo ('all the luck in the world') is an upcoming drama film written and directed by Esther Ortega (in her directorial debut feature). It stars Sofía Otero, Carolina Yuste, and Jaime Lorente.

== Plot ==
Set in San Blas in the 1980s, the plot explores the impact of the heroin epidemics in a family, as young Esther experiences the addiction of her parents Ali and Paco.

== Cast ==
- Jaime Lorente as Paco
- Carolina Yuste as Ali
- Sofía Otero as Esther
- David Verdaguer
- Fer Fraga
- Antonio Molero
- Óscar de la Fuente
- Ignacio Mateos

== Production ==
The director-screenwriter Esther Ortega taps from autobiographical elements, telling her story and that of her parents, heroin addicts for 14 years. Toda la suerte del mundo is a Spanish-Mexican co-production by AF and Match Point and it had the participation of Movistar Plus.

Shot in between the Canary Islands and Madrid, filming locations included Teror, that stood in for 1980s Madrid, as well as the streets of San Blas-Canillejas.

== Release ==
The release is expected for 2027.

== See also ==
- List of Spanish films of 2027
