= Mad Love (2009 film) =

- Spanish: Amores locos
- Directed by: Beda Docampo Feijóo
- Written by: Beda Docampo Feijóo
- Starring: Eduard Fernández; Irene Visedo; Carlos Hipólito; Marisa Paredes; Cuca Escribano; Marta Belaustegui
- Cinematography: Juanmi Azpiroz
- Edited by: Irene Blecua
- Music by: Juan Bardem
- Production companies: Nix Films AIE; Ángel Durández Adeva; Nada Music; Iroko Films; Quiéreme Producciones
- Distributed by: Wanda Visión
- Release dates: 20 March 2009 (Málaga); 19 February 2010 (Spain)
- Country: Spain
- Language: Spanish

Mad Love (Spanish: Amores locos) is a 2009 drama film directed and written by Beda Docampo Feijóo. It stars Irene Visedo and Eduard Fernández.

== Plot ==
The plot follows the story of a room attendant at the Prado Museum (Julia) who becomes infatuated with a visitor (Enrique), whom she identifies as being the character represented along her in a 17th-century Flemish painting exhibited at the museum. Enrique, a psychiatrist, decides to turn Julia into his patient.

== Cast ==
- Eduard Fernández as Enrique
- Irene Visedo as Julia
- Carlos Hipólito as Alfonso
- Marisa Paredes as Ana
- Cuca Escribano as Irene
- Marta Belaustegui as Susana
- Eva Pallarés as Eszter

== Production ==
The film is a Nix Films AIE, Ángel Durández Adeva, Nada Music, Iroko Films and Quiéreme Producciones production.

== Release ==
The film was presented at the 12th Málaga Film Festival in April 2009. It was released theatrically in Spain on 19 February 2010.

== Reception ==
Jonathan Holland of Variety assessed that, in the film, "a preposterous premise is skillfully crafted into enjoyable, stately romance".

Irene Crespo of Cinemanía rated the film 2 out of 5 stars, lamenting "a priori interesting" idea/film "that ends up lost between psychoanalysis sessions and scientific explanations about post-traumatic trauma".

== See also ==
- List of Spanish films of 2010
