= The Lost Steps =

2001 film by Manane Rodríguez

- Theatrical release poster
- Directed by: Manane Rodríguez
- Screenplay by: Manane Rodríguez; Xavier Bermúdez
- Produced by: Rafael Díaz-Salgado
- Starring: Irene Visedo; Luis Brandoni; Federico Luppi
- Cinematography: Juan Carlos Gómez
- Edited by: Esperanza Cobos
- Music by: Fernando Egozcue
- Production company: Anola Films S.L.
- Distributed by: United International Pictures
- Release date: August 9, 2001 (Argentina)
- Running time: 93 minutes
- Countries: Argentina; Spain
- Language: Spanish

The Lost Steps (Spanish: Los pasos perdidos) is a 2001 Argentine and Spanish drama film directed by Manane Rodríguez and written by Rodríguez and Xavier Bermúdez. The film features Irene Visedo, Luis Brandoni, Federico Luppi, among others.

== Plot ==
The film tells the story of Mónica Erigaray (Irene Visedo), who is twenty years old and lives with her parents Ernesto Erigaray (Luis Brandoni) and Inés (Concha Velasco). Seventeen years ago the Erigarays left Argentina and moved to Spain to live a peaceful and quiet life.

However, things change rather abruptly when a famous Argentinian writer named Bruno Leardi (Federico Luppi) claims that Mónica is in reality his granddaughter named Diana, daughter of his son Diego Liardi who disappeared during the Dirty War in Argentina.

At one point in the film Ernesto Erigaray and his cohorts accost Bruno and make it clear that harm will come to him if he persists with his accusations and attempts to see Mónica.

Erigaray decides to confront Bruno in his hotel room, but nothing is settled. The family ends up in a Court approved hearing and Ernesto Erigaray is accused of being the Argentine torturer known by his men as "El Sapo" ("The Toad") who did his nasty work in a place known as "the Cesspit." Subsequently, DNA tests prove that Mónica is indeed the daughter of Diego Liardi and Sara Pereira (a Spanish citizen). Mónica leaves the Erigaray's and they are arrested and tried for the murder of a Spanish citizen and Mónica's illegal abduction.

One year later Mónica travels to Buenos Aires and marches with the Mothers of the Plaza de Mayo. She drops by her grandfather's home and tells him Diana has come to call on him.

The film ends with the dedication:

To the mothers and grandmothers of Plaza del Mayo, and to those who resist the abduction of our memories.

== Cast ==
- Irene Visedo as Mónica Erigaray (Diana Leardi Pereira)
- Luis Brandoni as Ernesto Erigaray
- Concha Velasco as Inés Laroche
- Federico Luppi as Bruno Leardi
- Juan Querol as Pablo
- Jesús Blanco as Luis
- Gabriel Moreno as Gómez
- Pedro Miguel Martínez as Mélendez
- Cristina Collado as Míriam
- Amparo Valle as Matilde
- Paulina Gálvez as Abogada Leardi
- Yael Barnatán as Silvia

== Reception ==
=== Critical response ===
Jonathan Holland, film critic for Variety magazine, gave the film a mixed review, and wrote, "Built around the children of Argentina's "desaparecidos"—political victims who disappeared during the 1970s military dictatorship—The Lost Steps delivers a challenging political message in an easy-to-swallow manner. Uruguayan director Manane Rodriguez's sophomore feature—following Portrait of Woman With Man in Background (1997)—has powerful moments, but by focusing too strongly on the human interest rather than the politics, it ends up looking like a skeleton-in-the-closet family drama. Appearances in politically themed fests could be an option."

=== Awards ===
Wins

- Valladolid International Film Festival: FIPRESCI Prize - Special Mention, Manane Rodríguez; for confronting universal ambiguities in personal and social-political contexts and opting for harsh truth against convenient lies; 2001.
- Toulouse Cinespaña, Toulouse, France: Prix Cinespaña, Manane Rodríguez; 2002.

Nominations

- Argentine Film Critics Association Awards: Silver Condor, Best Actress, Irene Visedo; 2002.
- Bogota Film Festival: Golden Precolumbian Circle, Best Film, Manane Rodríguez; 2002.
- Valladolid International Film Festival: Golden Spike, Manane Rodríguez; 2001.

== See also ==
- List of Spanish films of 2001
- Maria Eugenia Sampallo
- Mothers of the Plaza de Mayo
