= The Anarchist's Wife =

- Film poster
- Directed by: Marie Noelle; Peter Sehr
- Written by: Marie Noelle; Ray Loriga
- Produced by: Marie Noelle; Norbert Llaras; Phillippe Planells; Peter Sehr; Jordi Rediu
- Starring: Juan Diego Botto; María Valverde; Ivana Baquero
- Music by: Zacarías M. de la Riva
- Release dates: June 2008 (Munich); 25 October 2008 (Seminci); 23 January 2009 (Spain)
- Languages: Spanish; French

The Anarchist's Wife (Spanish: La mujer del anarquista) is a 2008 Spanish-Franco-German film directed by Maria Noelle and Peter Sehr. It stars María Valverde, Juan Diego Botto and Ivana Baquero.

== Plot ==
The plot derives from the experience of a child's parents. Paloma's father, an anarchist, fought in Madrid against Francisco Franco's Nationalists during the Spanish Civil War. He was deported to a concentration camp, then fought for the French Resistance. His wife, with two young children, never gave up hope of seeing him again.

== Cast ==
- Juan Diego Botto as Justo Álvarez Calderón
- María Valverde as Manuela
- Alba Barragán as Paloma (child)
- Ivana Baquero as Paloma (teenager)
- Irene Visedo as Paloma (adult)
- Nina Hoss as Lenin
- Jean-Marc Barr as Pierre
- Pere Arquillué as Jaime
- Nathalie Grauwin as Marie
- Biel Durán as Luis
- Irene Montalà as Pilar
- Adrià Collado as Francisco
- Laura Morante as Lucienne

== Release ==
The film screened at the Filmfest München in June 2008, winning the festival's Bernhard Wicki Prize. It also screened at the 53rd Valladolid International Film Festival (Seminci) on 25 October 2008. The film was theatrically released in Spain, under the title La mujer del anarquista on 23 January 2019.
