= The Unnamed Zone =

La Zona (The Zone)
- Directed by: Carlos Rodriguez
- Produced by: Asun Lasarte
- Cinematography: Juantxu Beloki
- Music by: Janusz Wojtarowicz
- Release date: 2006
- Running time: 80 minutes
- Countries: Ukraine; Spain
- Language: Ukrainian with Spanish subtitles

The Unnamed Zone (Spanish: La Zona, Ukrainian: «Безіменна зона», romanized: Bezimenna zona) is a 2006 Spanish documentary film by director Carlos Rodríguez about the lives of three young Ukrainian children directly affected by the 1986 Chernobyl disaster.

== Synopsis ==
The Spanish film crew led by Carlos Rodriguez is following the life stories of three children - Lidia Pidvalna, Anastasia Pavlenko, and Andriy Kovalchuk - whose lives were drastically changed after an explosion at the Chernobyl Nuclear Power Station on April 26, 1986. Through the documentary, the children and their families "living perilously close to the exclusion zone around the destroyed station recount their fears, dreams, fantasies, and hopes for the future." Each child holds a "Chernobyl certificate" which bestows access to government grants and aid and is a gruesome reminder of their existential reality.

In the words of Nathan Southern, "through his film, Rodriguez paints a melancholic, enduring portrait of three young lives, forever damaged by falling into the path of a cataclysmic disaster that both preceded them and overtook them."

Rodriguez’ own take on the synopsis for his documentary is revealing: "after our experiences in... Ukraine, we believe that a nuclear disaster has consequences that are far more terrible and complex than its purely medical effects, as they pervade every single aspect of life in the area for several generations.
