= Carlos Rodríguez (film director) =

Spanish filmmaker (born 1966)

- Born: January 15, 1966 (age 59); Madrid, Spain
- Occupations: Film director, producer, screenwriter, editor
- Years active: 1994–present
- Spouse: Asun Lasarte

Carlos Rodríguez (born January 15, 1966) is a Spanish film director, producer, screenwriter and editor. He is the founder of Morgan Creativos, a creative studio based in Donostia-San Sebastian, specializing in audiovisual content for cultural events (museums, exhibitions, film festivals, live presentations...) and television.

== Works ==
- 1998 - Huellas de un espiritu (documentary)
- 1999 - Hitchcock: No Limit To Fiction (documentary) - Coppola, A Man And His Dreams (documentary)
- 2000 - Orson Welles In The Land Of Don Quixote (documentary)
- 2001 - Huston & Joyce, A Dialogue With The Dead (documentary)
- 2002 - Encadenados (Links) (documentary)
- 2003 - A Symphony in images (montage film)
- 2004 - Berlioz's Trip (documentary)
- 2005 - Edward Hopper, el pintor del silencio (documentary)
- 2006 - La Zona
- 2007 - Camara negra (short documentary film)
- 2009 - Ataque al poblado de La Hoya (live action-animation short film)
- 2010 - Una historia del zinemaldia (documentary TV series)
- 2011 - The Challenges (video installation) - Open Sea (video installation) - Berriro igo nauzu (shortfilm)
- 2012 - #VictoriaEugenia, The Social Network (video installation)
- 2013 - 200 - San Sebastian 1813-2013 (video installation) - Bereterretxe (animated short film)
- 2014 - Comète, the escape network (video installation)
- 2015 - #jazzaldia50 (documentary) - Dolomitas del Norte (video installation) - Ikimilikiliklik, the World of JA Artze (video installation)
- 2016 - DSS2016. The legacy (documentary) - DSS2016. Ship's Logbooks (video installation)
- 2018 - All Tomorrow's Libraries (video installation) - Uhain Berria (Documentary) - Arrietakua (short documentary film)
- 2019 - Heriotza. Facing Death (video installation) - Basque Shepherding: yesterday and today (short documentary film)
