= Brihuega =

- City and Municipality
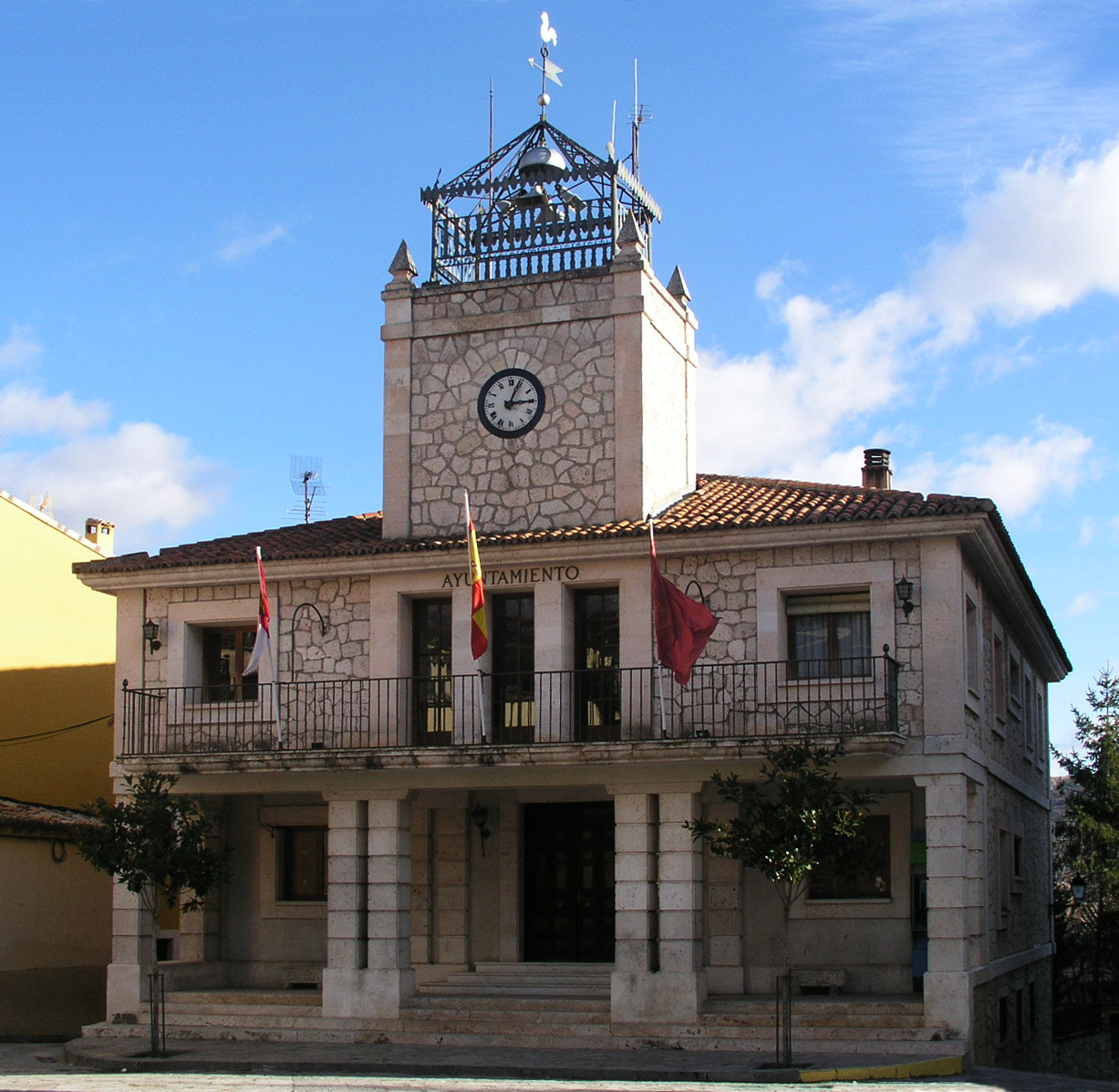

- Flag Coat of arms

- Location within Province of Guadalajara Location within Castilla-La Mancha Location within Spain
- Coordinates: 40°45′38″N 2°52′09″W
- Country: Spain
- Autonomous community: Castilla-La Mancha
- Province: Guadalajara
- Comarca: La Alcarria
- Municipality: Brihuega

Area
  - Total: 296.41 km^{2} (114.44 sq mi)
- Elevation: 920 m (3,020 ft)

Population (2025-01-01)
  - Total: 2,826
  - Density: 9.534/km^{2} (24.69/sq mi)
- Time zone: UTC+1 (CET)
  - Summer (DST): UTC+2 (CEST)
- Climate: Cfb

Brihuega is a municipality located in the province of Guadalajara, Spain. According to the 2007 census (INE), the municipality had a population of 2,835 inhabitants.

In 1710 a hard-fought battle took place in the township between Lord Stanhope's troops and the Franco-Spanish army during the War of the Spanish Succession. The town was also the scene of violent battles during the Battle of Guadalajara in the Spanish Civil War.

== Gallery ==
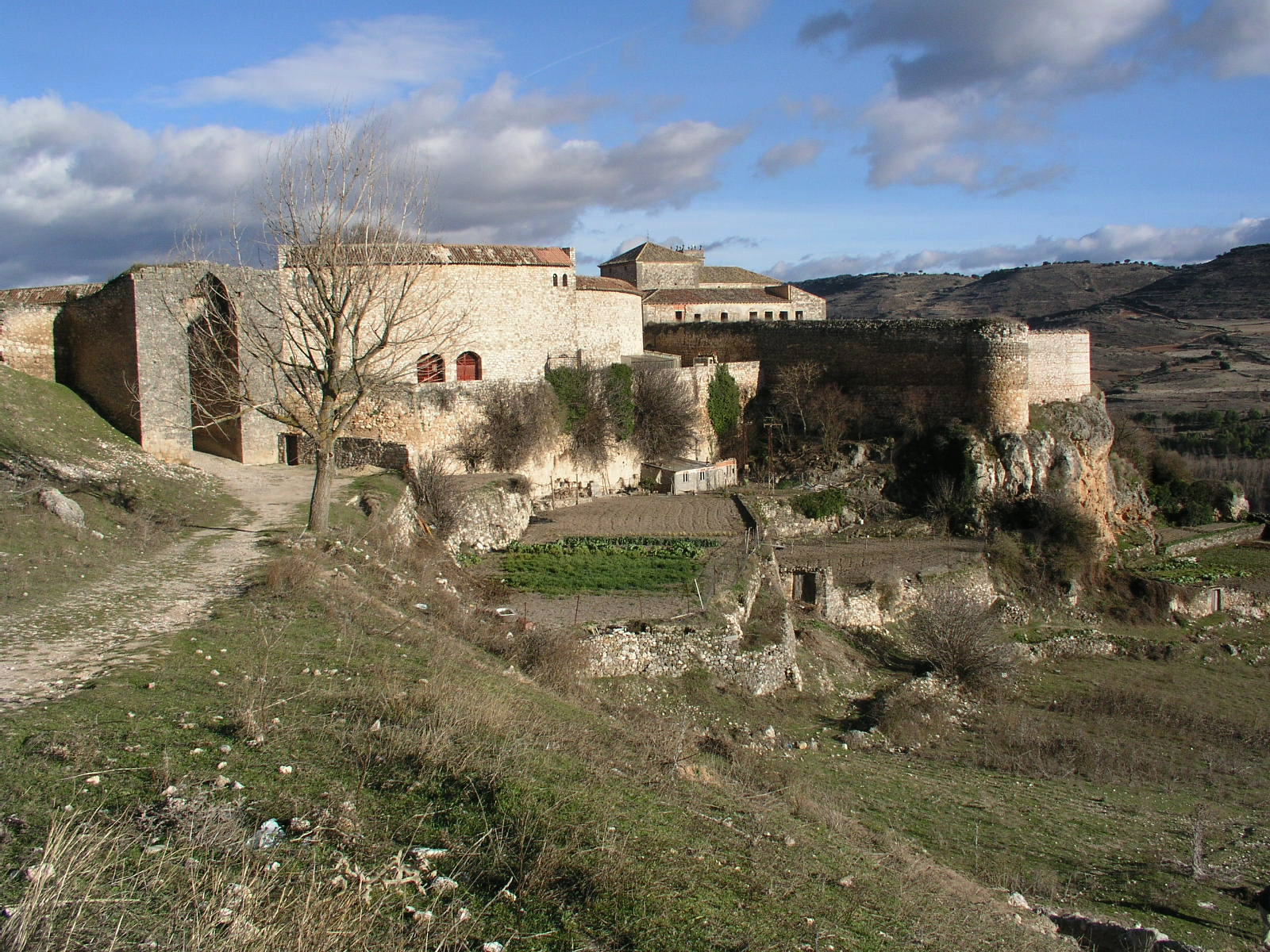
Cozagón Arch

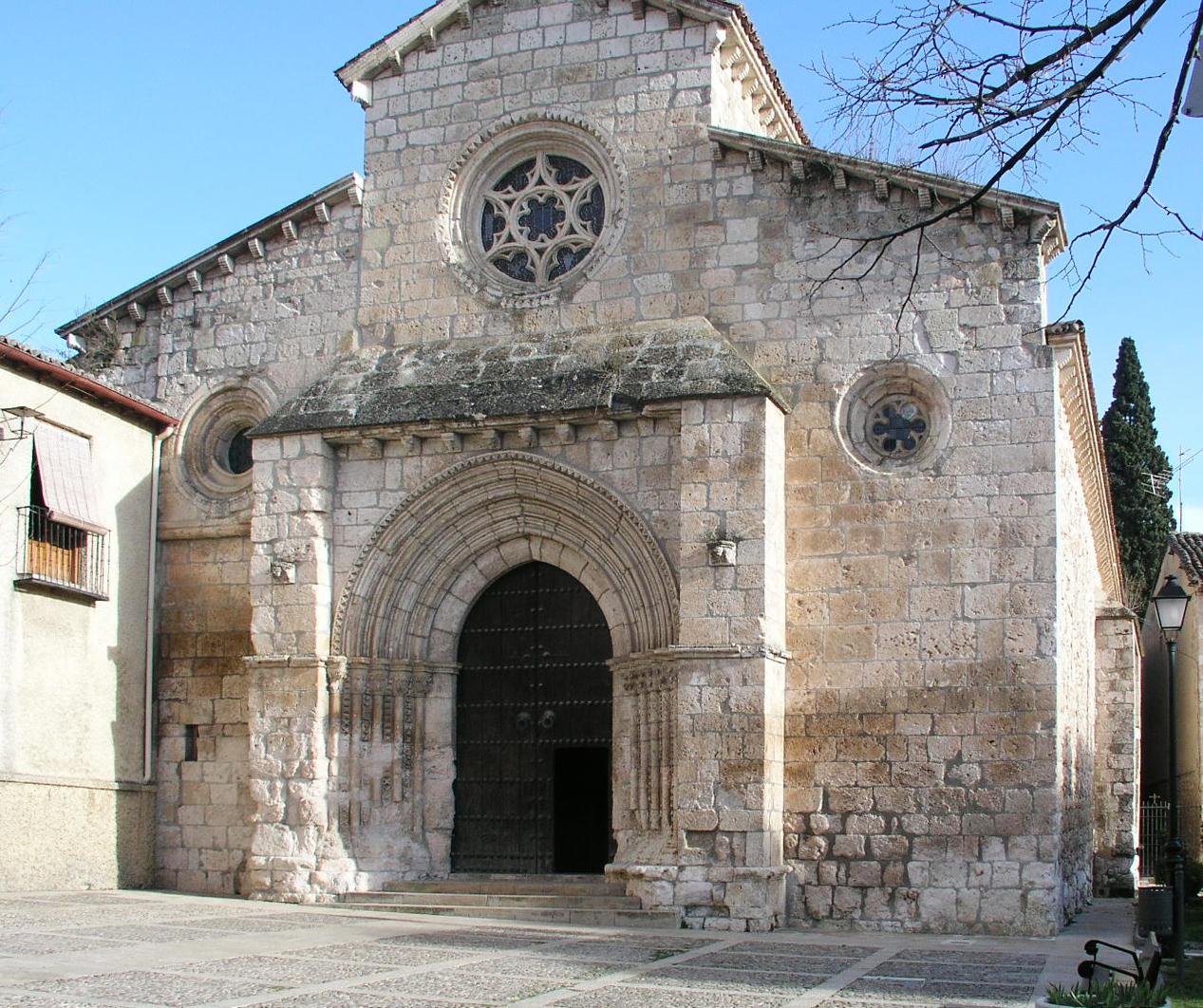
San Felipe Church

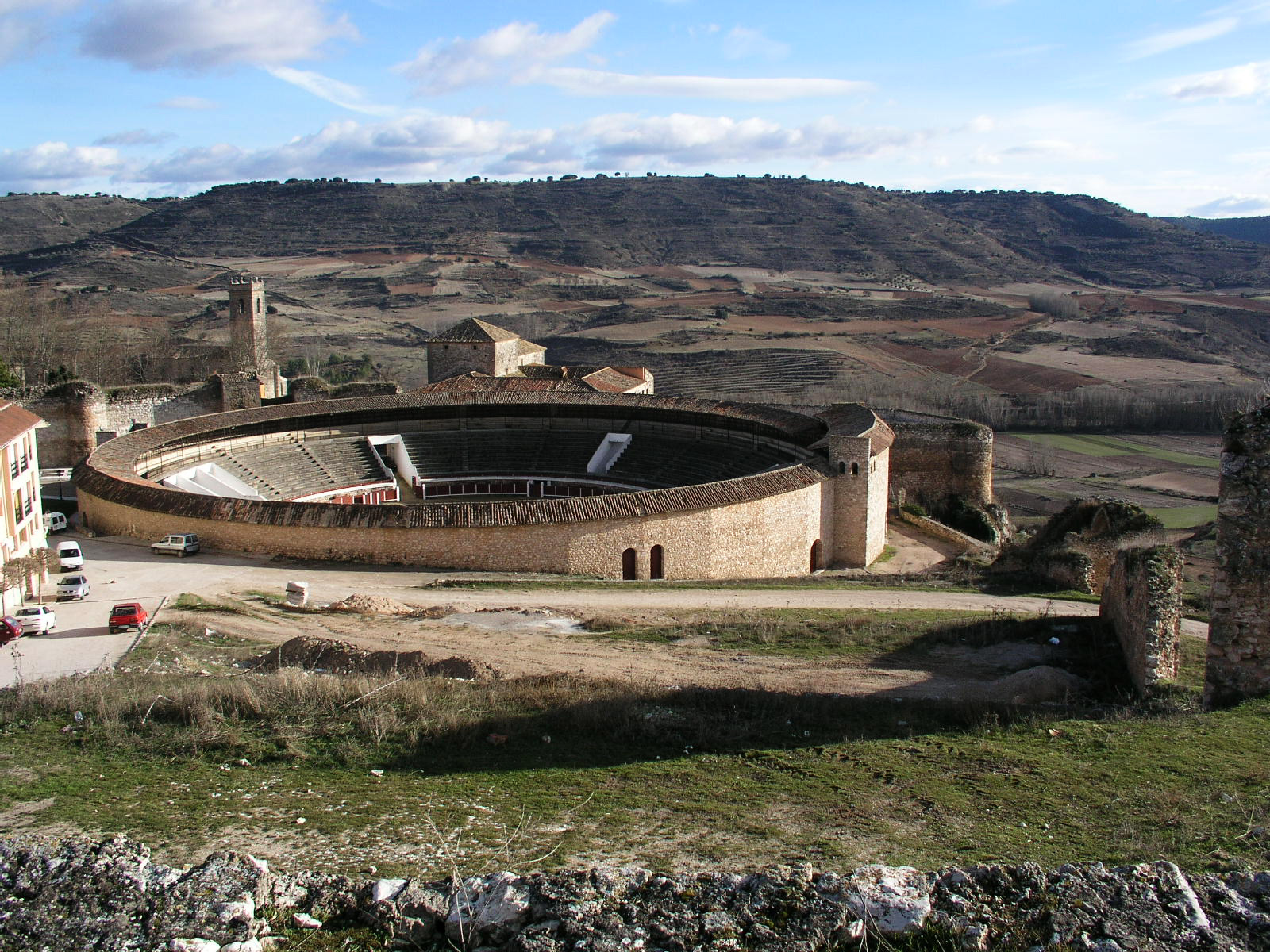
Bullring

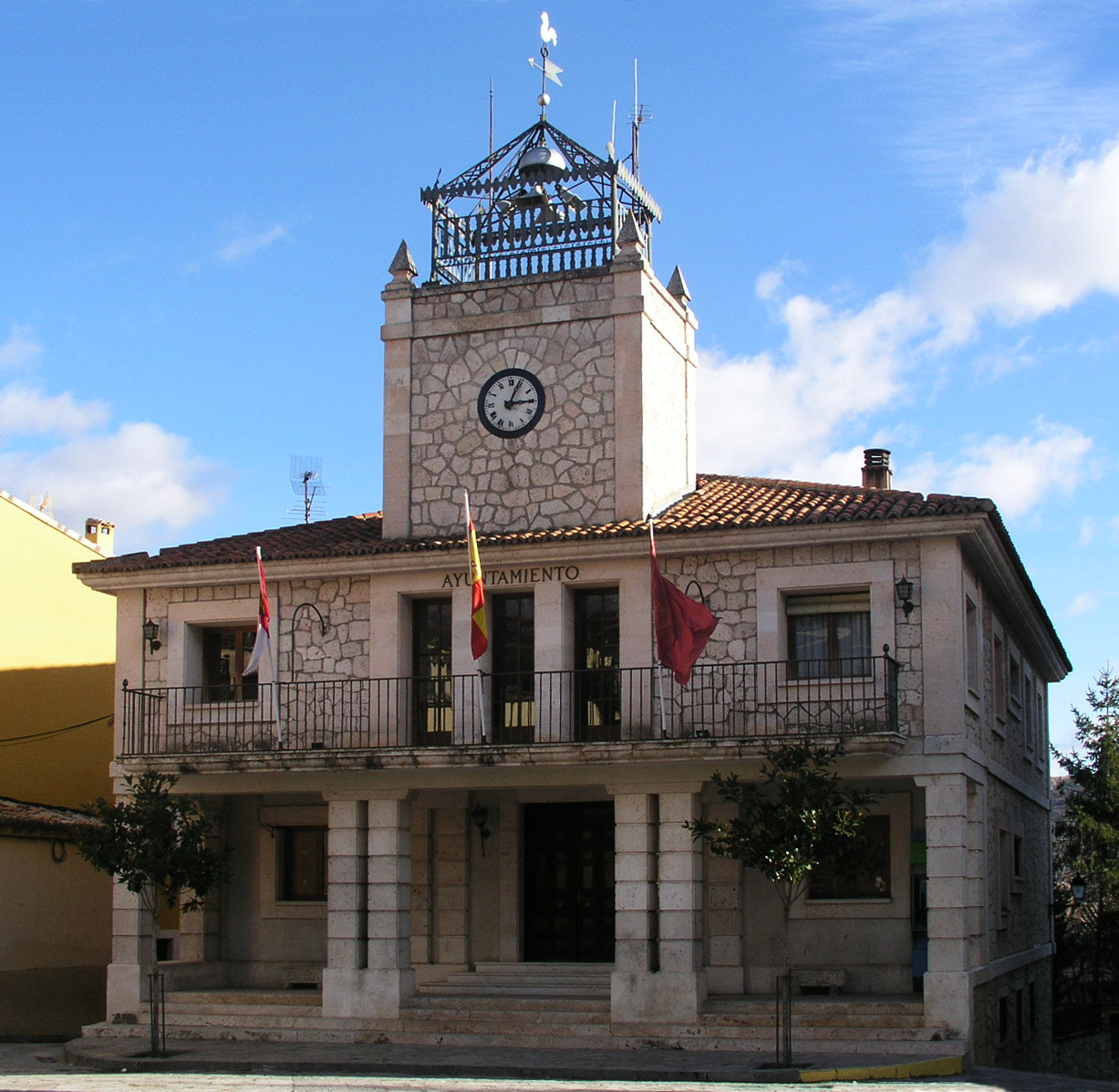
Town Hall

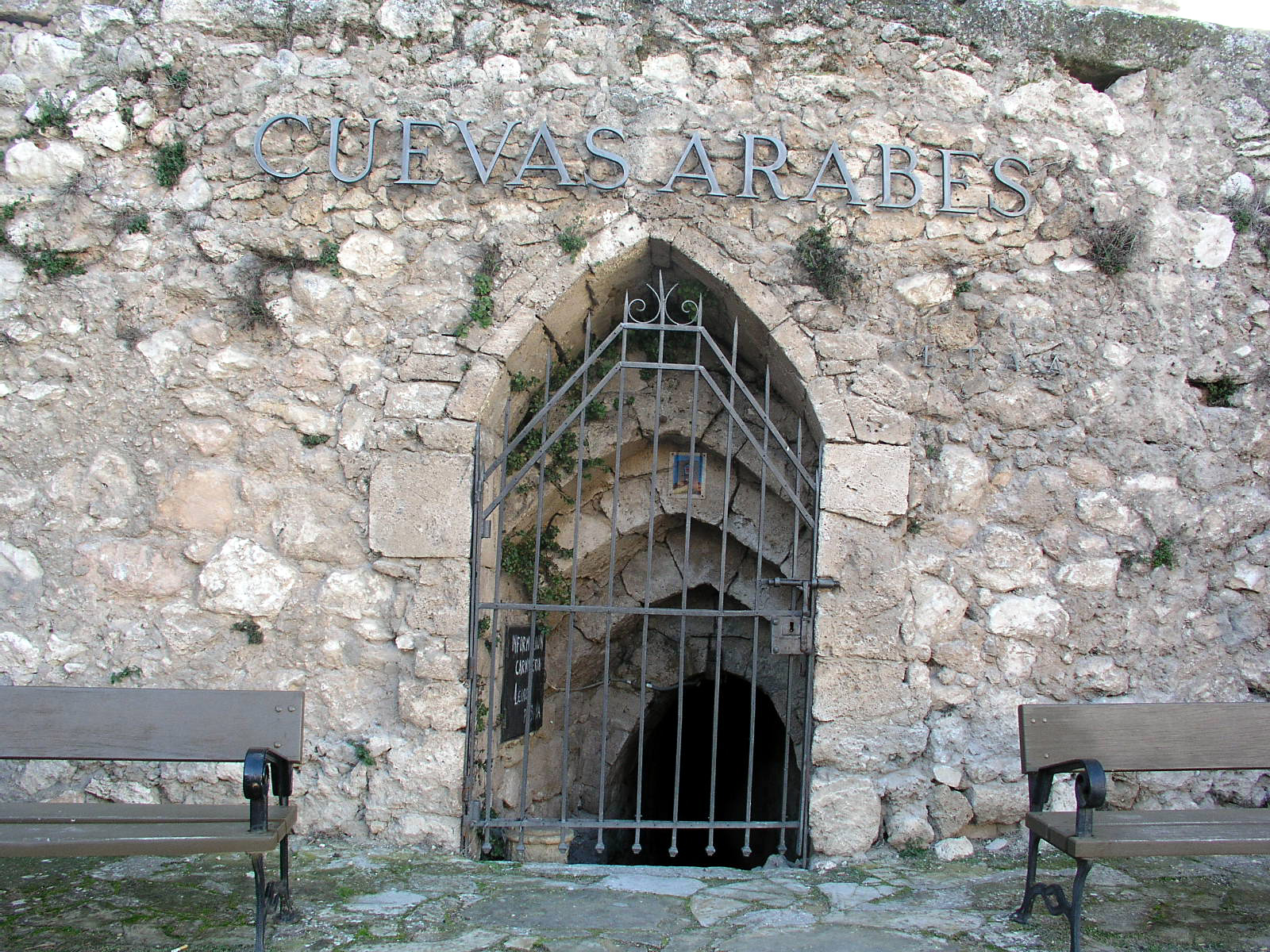
Arab Caves

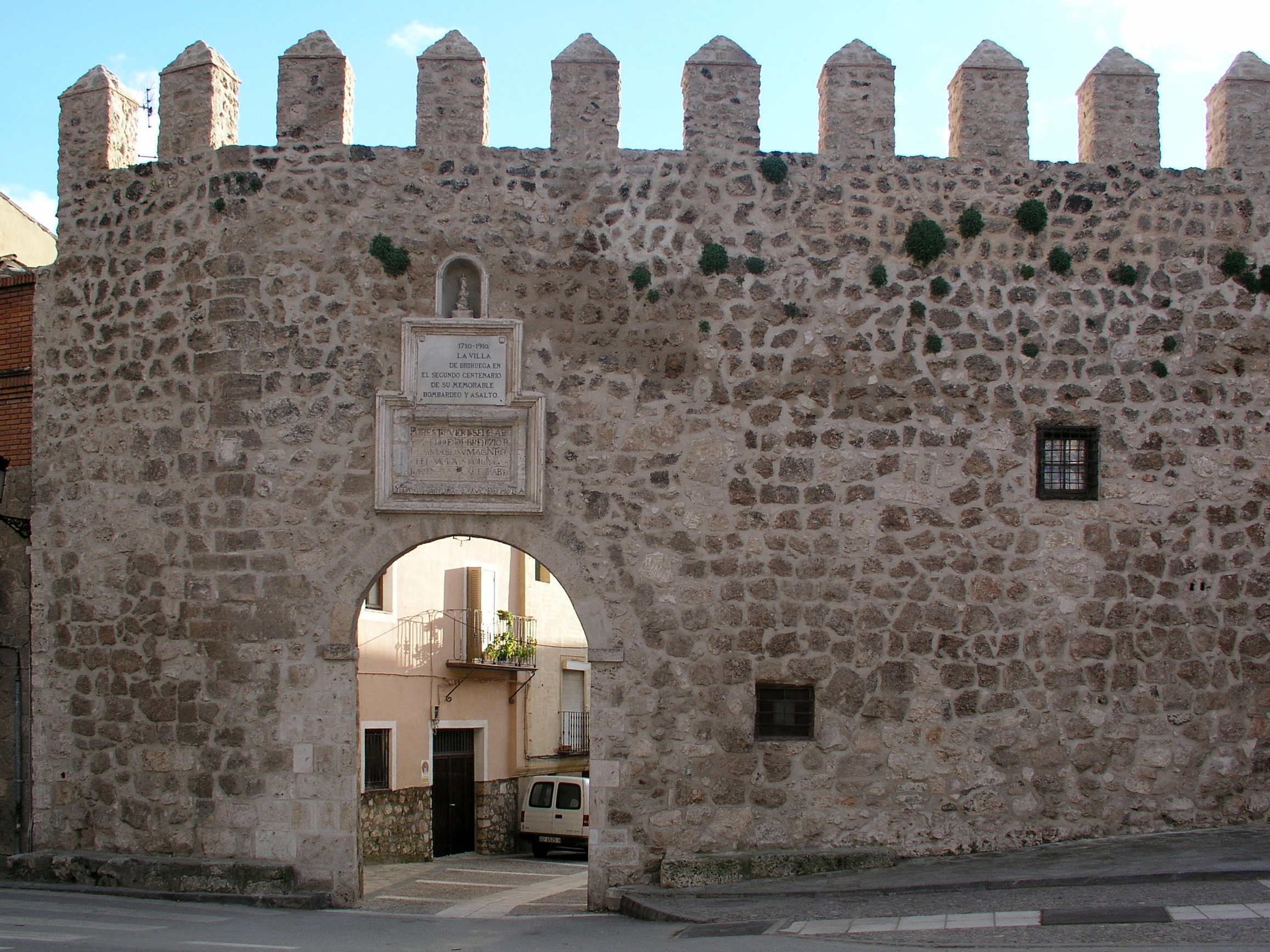
Cadena Gate

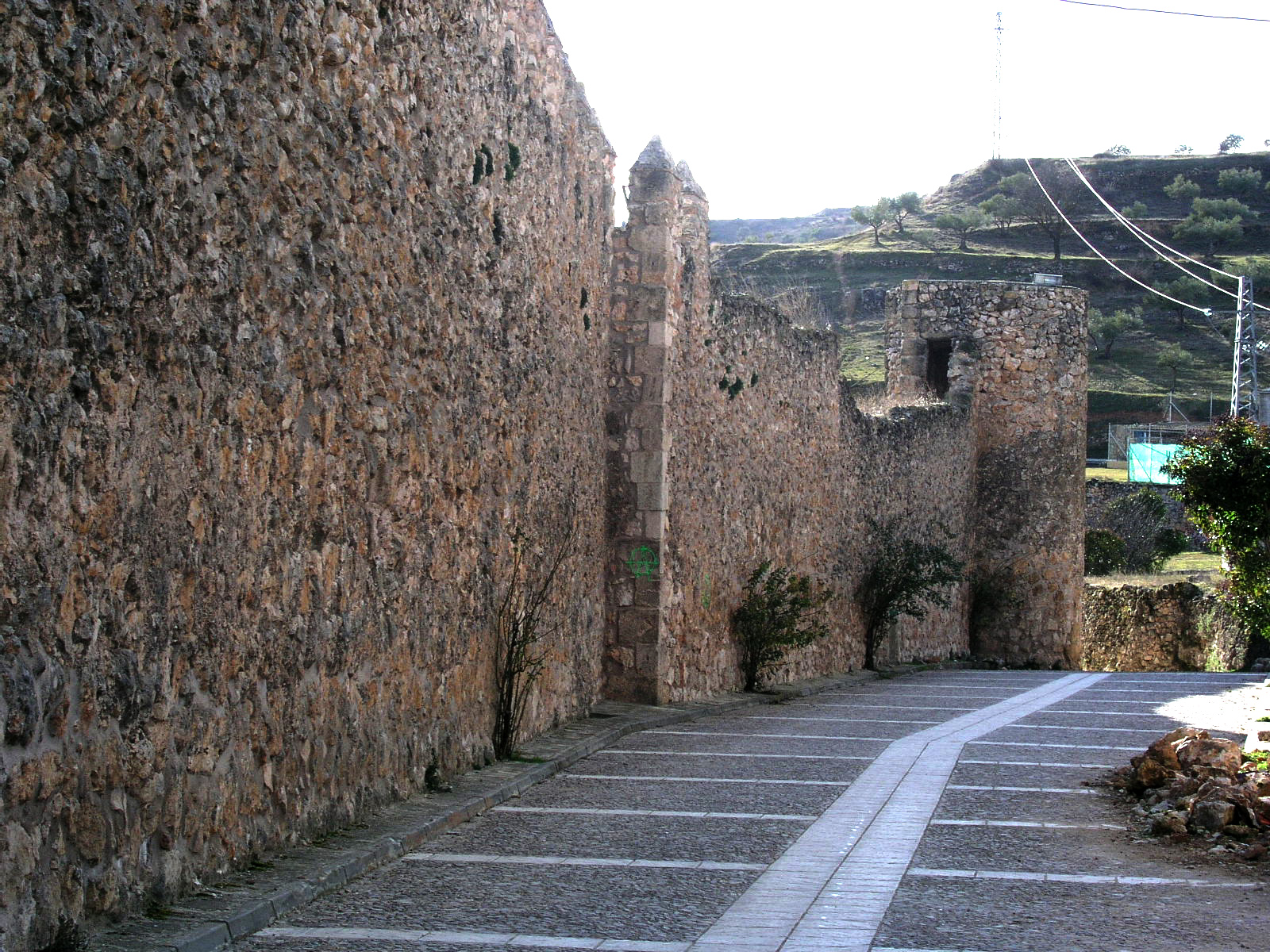
Ancient Brihuega's City Walls

== Mayors ==
- Adela de la Torre de Lope (2007–2015)

== See also ==
- Church of la Virgen de la Asunción (Romancos)
