= Cogollor =

- Municipality
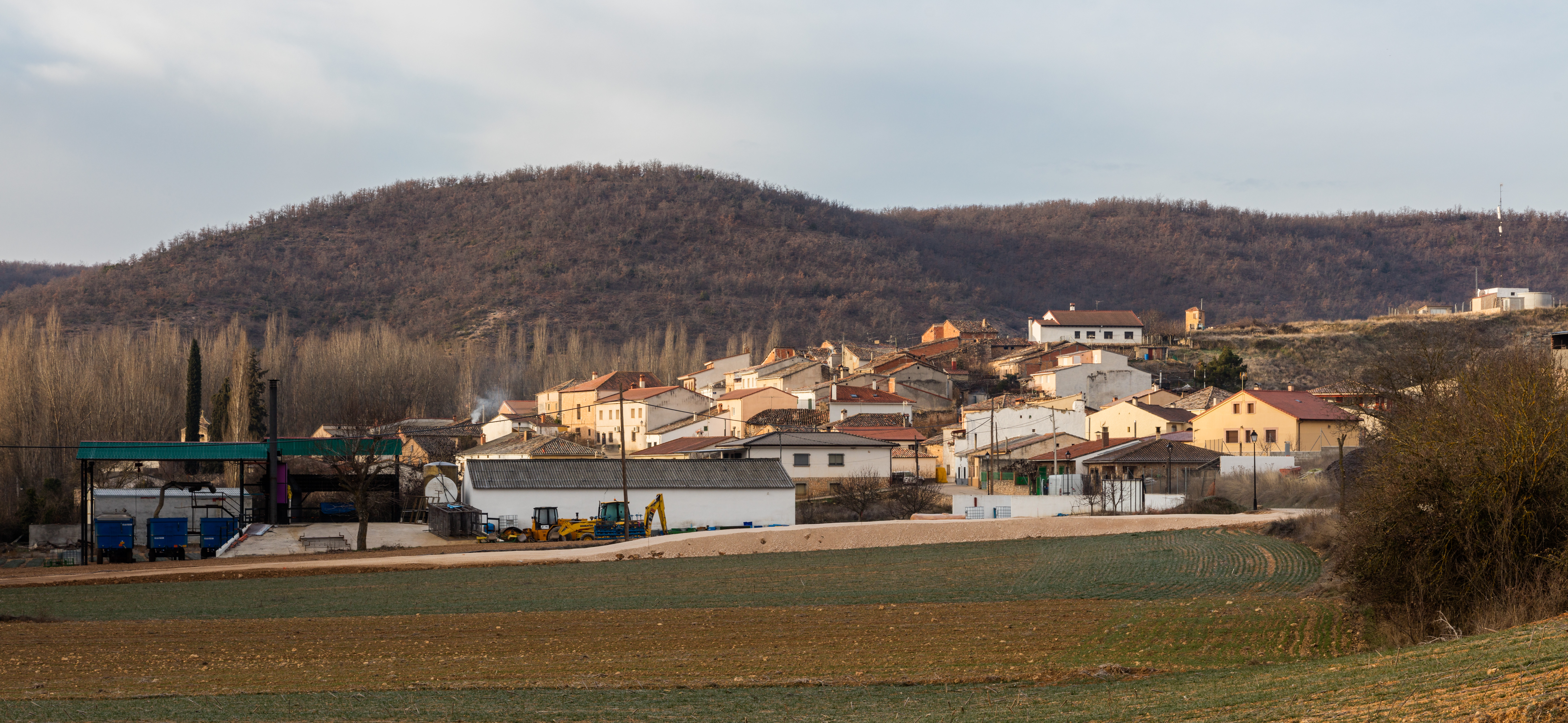

- Location within Spain Location within Castilla-La Mancha Location within Province of Guadalajara
- Country: Spain
- Autonomous community: Castile-La Mancha
- Province: Guadalajara

Area
  - Total: 8.32 km^{2} (3.21 sq mi)
- Elevation: 950 m (3,120 ft)

Population (2025-01-01)
  - Total: 19
  - Density: 2.3/km^{2} (5.9/sq mi)
- Time zone: UTC+1 (CET)
  - Summer (DST): UTC+2 (CEST)

Cogollor is a municipality located in the province of Guadalajara, Castile-La Mancha, Spain. Featuring a total area of 8.32 km, as of 1 January 2019 it has a population of 25 inhabitants. It lies at 950 metres above sea level.
