= Antonio Román Jasanada =

Spanish politician (born 1965)

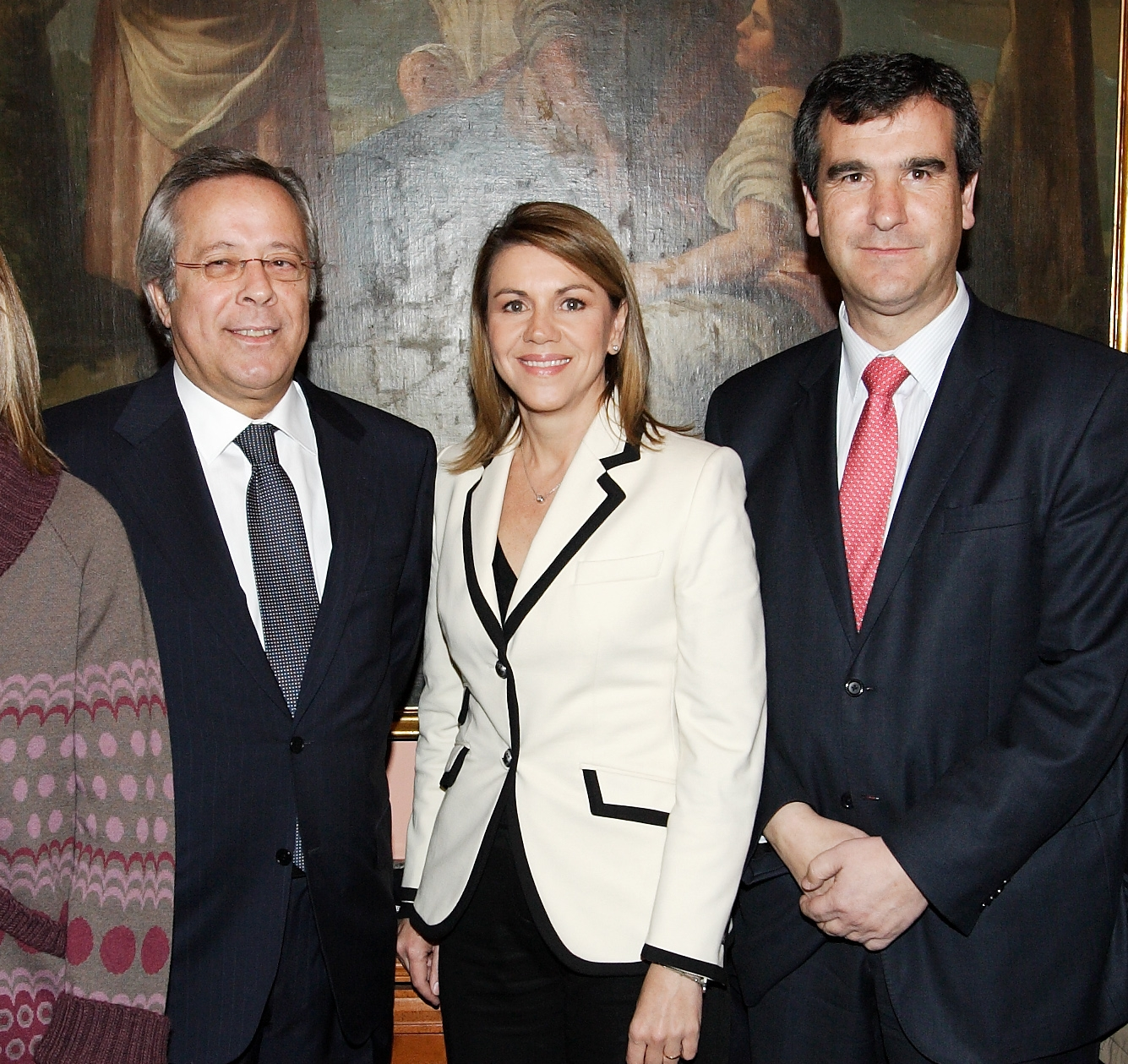

Member of the Congress of Deputies
- Incumbent
- Assumed office 17 August 2023
- Constituency: Guadalajara
- In office 13 December 2011 – 27 October 2015
- Constituency: Guadalajara
- In office 17 June 2003 – 2 April 2004
- Preceded by: Ana Guarinos López
- Constituency: Guadalajara

Member of the Senate
- In office 28 April 2019 – 30 May 2023
- Constituency: Guadalajara
- In office 2 February 2004 – 15 January 2008
- Constituency: Guadalajara

Personal details
- Born: 21 July 1965 (age 60)
- Party: People's Party

Antonio Román Jasanada (born 21 July 1965) is a Spanish politician. He has been a member of the Congress of Deputies since 2023, having previously served from 2003 to 2004 and from 2011 to 2015. He was a member of the Senate from 2004 to 2008 and from 2019 to 2023. From 2007 to 2019, he served as mayor of Guadalajara.
