= Sofía Otero =

Spanish actress (born 2013)

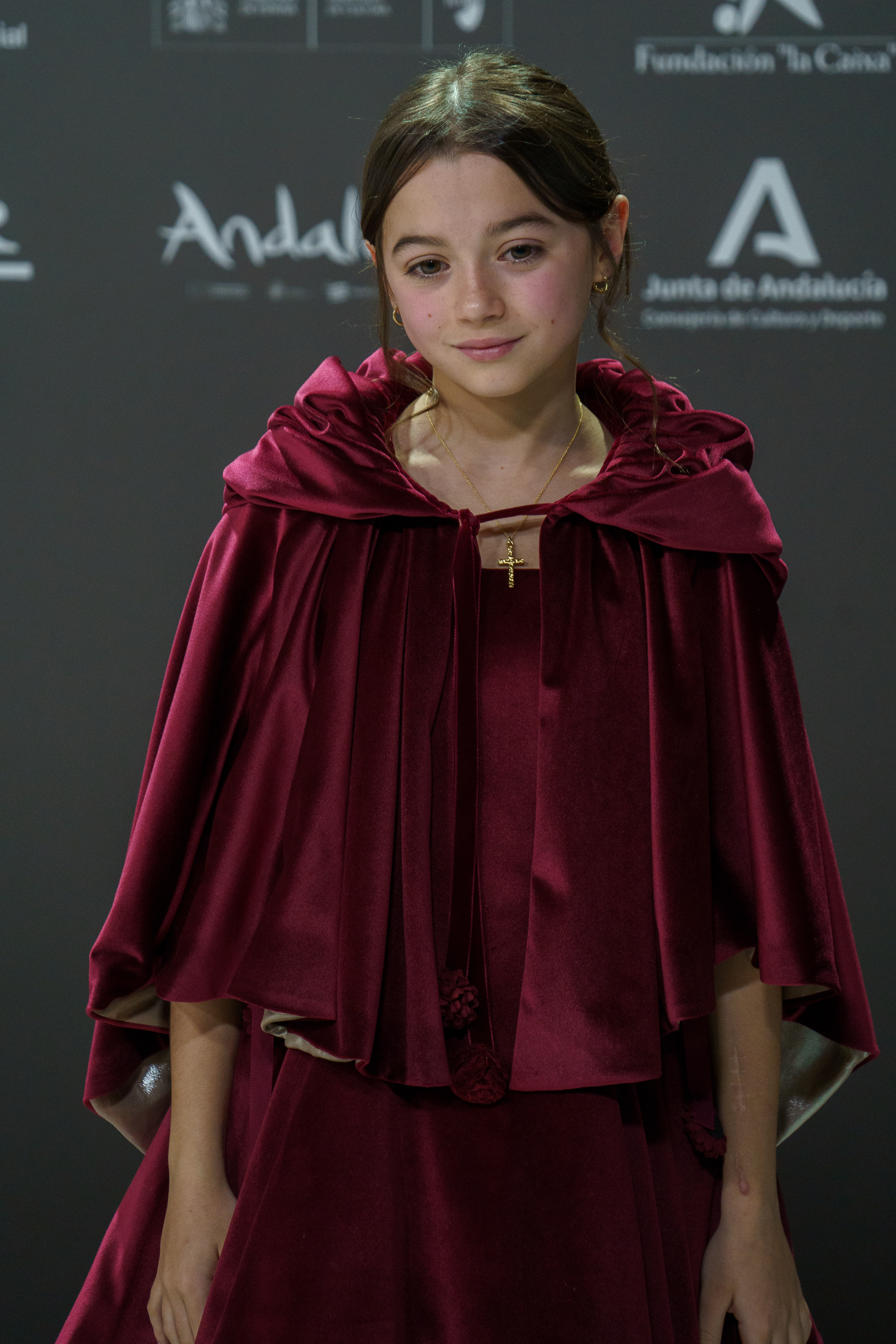
- Otero in 2025
- Born: Sofía Otero Labrador; 31 March 2013 (age 13); Barakaldo, Basque Country, Spain
- Occupation: Actress
- Years active: 2022–present
- Awards: Silver Bear for Best Leading Performance; 2023 20,000 Species of Bees

Sofía Otero Labrador (born 31 March 2013) is a Spanish child actress, who played a starring role in her film debut in 20,000 Species of Bees. The film won her the 2023 Silver Bear for Best Leading Performance at the 73rd Berlin International Film Festival, becoming the youngest person to win the award.

== Biography ==
Otero was born 31 March 2013 in Barakaldo and lives in Basauri, Spain. She made her film debut when director Estibaliz Urresola Solaguren cast her as the protagonist for 20,000 Species of Bees after auditioning 500 girls. The film tells the story of a transgender girl and her relationship with her family. To help an accurate portrayal, Naizen, a regional association for the families of transgender minors, worked with the director and provided guidance for Otero. Stephanie Bunbury of Deadline Hollywood praised Otero's performance, writing that she "shows an instinctive, unforced and generous understanding of how difficult her character's life must be." Lee Marshall of Screen Daily wrote that "Sofia Otero is never less than compelling, her face a deep pool that becomes a magnet for the audience".

In 2023, Otero joined the cast of Martín Cuervo's comedy Who Is Who?, a remake of the 2020 French film Le Sens de la famille. In 2024, she joined the cast of Borja Cobeaga's Los aitas, a comedy film set in the late 1980s about a group of fathers accompanying their daughters to a rhythmic gymnastics championship in Berlin.

She starred in the drama Cuatro paredes (2025), which premiered at the BCN Film Fest. It was filmed in 12 sequence shots. Also in 2025, she appeared in the music video for Aitana's song "Cuando hables con él". In 2025, she also featured in Under Your Feet. She appeared in the comedy series Many People Need to Die, which premiered at the 2026 Canneseries. She also played a part in Esther Ortega's film Toda la suerte del mundo.

== Awards ==
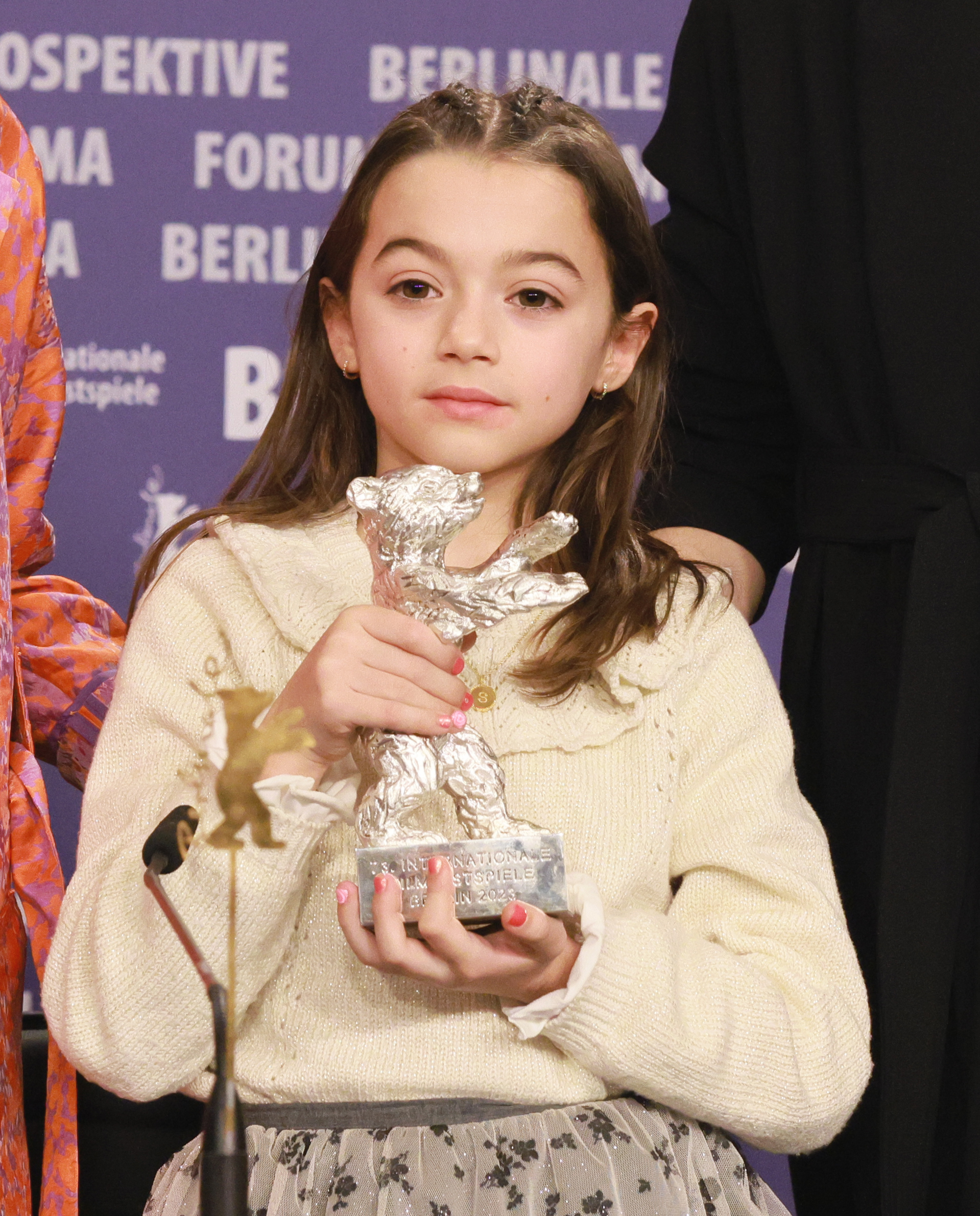
Otero with her Silver Bear for Best Leading Performance, February 2023

Otero received several honours for her work in 20,000 Species of Bees, including winning the 2023 Silver Bear for Best Leading Performance, becoming the youngest actor to have won the award. She was also part of the honorees when 20,000 Species Of Bees won the award for a female cast ensemble at the 47th Hong Kong International Film Festival and the Maguey Award for Best Performance by an Ensemble at the 2023 Guadalajara International Film Festival.

In April 2023, the Basauri City Council paid tribute to Otero for winning her Silver Bear award.
