= Arantxa Echevarría =

Spanish filmmaker and television producer

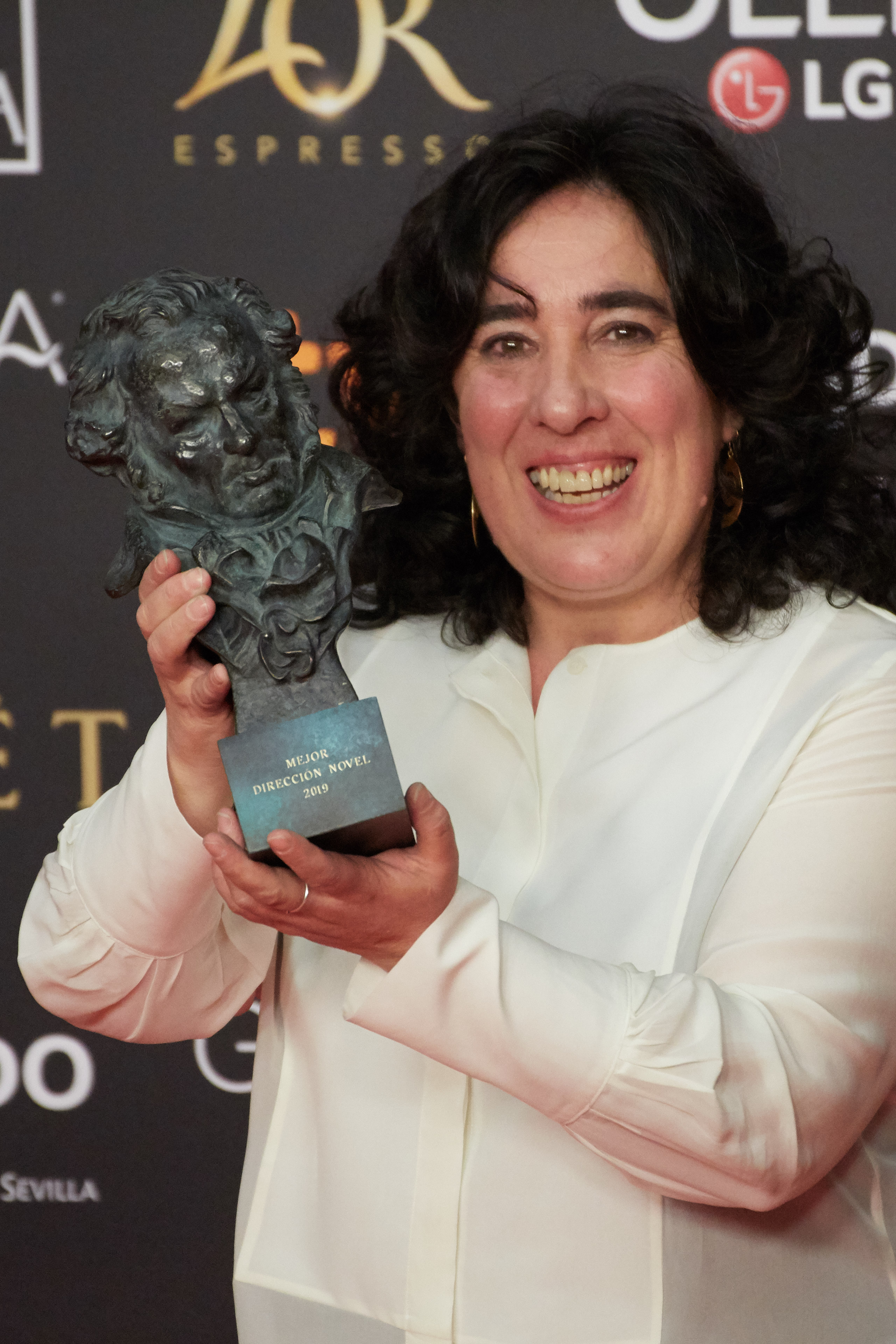
- Echevarría in 2018
- Born: Arantxa Echevarría Carcedo; 1968 (age 57–58); Bilbao, Biscay, Spain
- Occupations: Film director; television director; screenwriter; producer

Arantxa Echevarría Carcedo (born 1968) is a Spanish filmmaker and television producer.

== Biography ==
Arantxa Echevarría Carcedo was born in 1968 in Bilbao. She studied a degree in Sciences of the Image and a specialization in audiovisual production at the Complutense University of Madrid, and pursued further studies at Sydney Community College. She has worked in cinema and television since 1991.

Her short film De noche y de pronto earned a nomination to the Goya Award for Best Fictional Short Film.

Her feature debut Carmen & Lola (2018) earned her the Goya Award for Best New Director, past her fifties. It was followed by her second feature The Perfect Family (2021). She also directed one episode of El Cid's first season. In 2022, she began shooting her third feature, Chinas. Her fourth and fifth films, Políticamente incorrectos and Undercover, were both released in 2024. The latter won the Goya Award for Best Film and earned Echevarría a Best Director nomination at the 39th Goya Awards.

== Filmography ==
Year	Title	Director	Writer	Notes
2018	Carmen & Lola	Yes	Yes	Also executive producer
2021	The Perfect Family	Yes	No	
2023	Chinas	Yes	Yes	Also producer and casting
2024	Políticamente incorrectos	Yes	No	
2024	Undercover	Yes	Yes	
2026	Cada día nace un listo	Yes	Yes	
