= Gonzalo de Castro =

Spanish actor

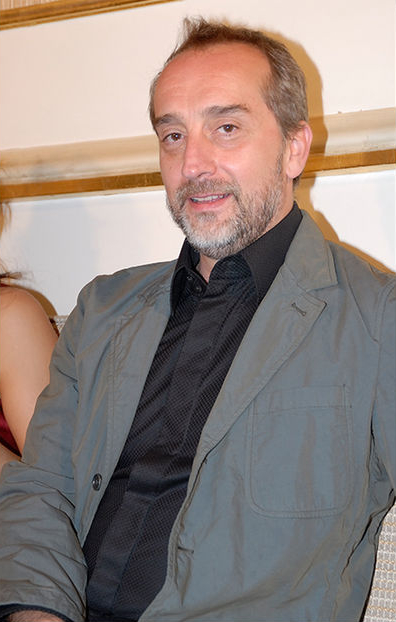
- Born: 2 February 1963 (age 63); Madrid, Spain
- Occupation: Actor

Gonzalo de Castro (born 2 February 1963, in Madrid) is a Spanish actor.

== Biography ==
He studied law and graduated at age 23, but soon he decided to pursue acting. He debuted in the theatre play Por los pelos (1992). He had small roles in films and theater. In 1999 he started working on the series Siete Vidas as a helper and assistant director. The producer chose him for episodic character (Gonzalo, the owner of the bar) and that character became one of the main ones for seven years.
Finished Siete Vidas, De Castro starred Doctor Mateo (2009–2011), the Spanish remake of Doc Martin, for which he received several awards for best television actor in 2009 and 2010.
He has been boyfriend of the actresses Nathalie Poza (until 2008) and Natalia Verbeke (2010–2013).

== Career ==
=== Television ===
- 7 vidas (1999–2006), in Telecinco
- Doctor Mateo (2009–2011), in Antena 3
- Matar al padre (2018), in Movistar+.
- The Innocent (2021), in Netflix.
- The Final Problem (2026), in Netflix.

=== Films ===
- Lisboa, faca no coração (1998), by Manuel Palacios
- Coppola: Un hombre y sus sueños (1999), by Carlos Rodríguez
- Gente pez (2001), by Jorge Iglesias
- Madagascar (2005, Spanish voice of David Schwimmer), by Eric Darnell & Tom McGrath
- La torre de Suso (2007), by Tom Fernández
- Rivales (2008), by Fernando Colomo
- ¿Para qué sirve un oso? (2011), by Tom Fernández
- Las furias (2016)
- Superlópez (2018)
- La ternura (2023)
- Políticamente incorrectos (2024)
