= Celia de Molina =

Spanish actress

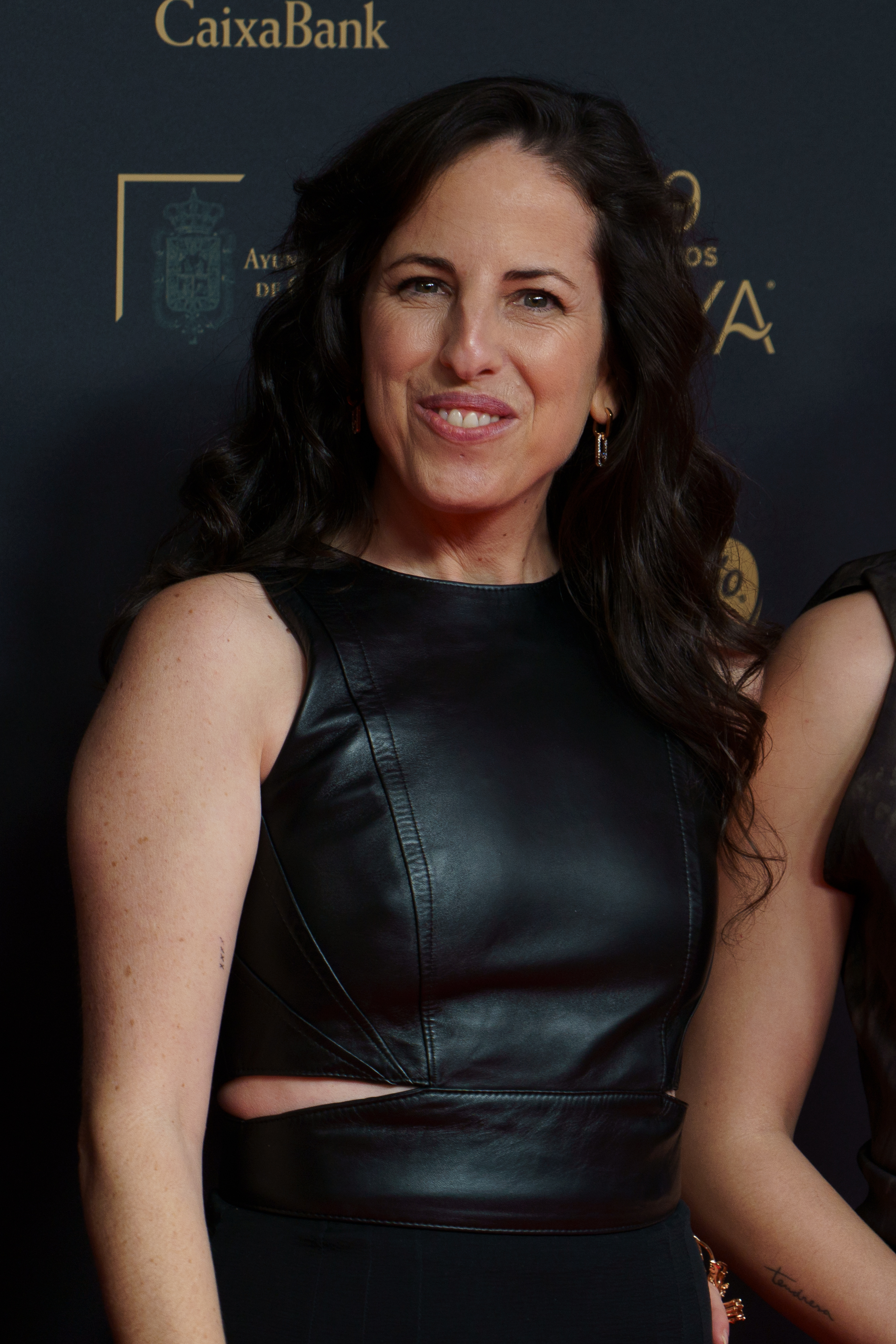
- De Molina in 2025
- Born: Celia de Molina Díaz; 31 March 1983 (age 42); Linares, Jaén, Spain
- Occupation: Actress
- Years active: 2007–present
- Relatives: Natalia de Molina (sister)

Celia de Molina Díaz (born 31 March 1983 in Linares, Jaén) is a Spanish actress and screenwriter known for starring in the film Cómo sobrevivir a una despedida and for being the creator and host of the web series El antivlog.

== Biography ==
Celia de Molina was born on March 31, 1983, in Linares, Jaén, but grew up in Granada. She is the daughter of Agustin de Molina Ortega and Emilia Diaz Quero. She is the older sister of the actress, Natalia de Molina. She has two older sisters, Isabel De Molina and Emilia De Molina. She graduated from the Escuela Superior de Arte Dramático de Sevilla y Málaga in 2007 and has taken several training courses, both in acting and in dance and singing.

== Career ==
She has developed most of her career as an actress in theater. In 2010, she created the theatrical space Garaje Lumière in Madrid, which she directed and played the role of stage programmer for three years.

Her television debut was with a small episodic role in the Canal Sur series Arrayán. We have also been able to see her in series such as Anclados, Yo quisiera and Cuerpo de Élite with episodic characters. In 2018, she appeared as a secondary in the series Lontano da te, which is currently in post-production and can be seen in Italy and Spain, and stars Megan Montaner, Pepón Nieto and Rosario Pardo, among others.

In the cinema, she has had several incursions as a supporting actress. Her big break came in 2015 when she starred in the film Cómo sobrevivir a una despedida by director Manuela Burló Moreno. She appeared in that film alongside her sister Natalia de Molina, Úrsula Corberó, Brays Efe and María Hervás.

In 2016, she created and starred in the webseries El Antivlog, which can be seen through the platform Flooxer. It is a humorous critique of the vlogger world.

In 2017, she started working on the comedy Late Motiv, directed by Andreu Buenafuente and broadcast on the pay channel #0. Also in that year, she was in the second season of the comedy show El fin de la comedia, which was led by Ignatius Farray.

She is currently developing what will be her first feature film as screenwriter and director, No es universal at the Film Academy Residencies.

== Filmography ==
=== Feature films ===
Year	Title	Directed by	Role
2009	Madre amadísima	Pilar Távora	Celia
2013	Temporal	José Luis López González	Jenifer
2015	Cómo sobrevivir a una despedida	Manuela Burló Moreno	Gisela
2016	Marica tú	Ismael Núñez	Charuca
2019	¿A quién te llevarías a una isla desierta?	Jota Linares	Celia
2021	El Cover	Secun de la Rosa	Amanda

=== Television ===
Year	Title	Channel	Role	Duration
2015	Anclados	Telecinco	Carolina González	1 episode
2016 – 2017	El antivlog	Flooxer	Celia	12 episodes
2017	El fin de la comedia	Comedy Central	Ella misma	1 episode
2018	Cuerpo de élite	Antena 3	Loli García	1 episode
2018	Yo quisiera	Divinity	Celia	1 episode
2018	Gente hablando	Flooxer	Marta	1 episode
2018	Pequeñas coincidencias	Amazon Prime Video	Cuñada de Javi	1 episode
2019	Terror y feria	Flooxer	Rosa Mari Lifante	1 episode
2020	Lejos de ti	Telecinco	Anna	7 episodes
2021	El Vecino	Netflix	Greta	3 episodes
2021	Reyes de la noche	Movistar	Concha	6 episodes

=== Television programs ===
Year	Title	Channel	Role
2017	Late motiv	#0	Collaborator
2018 – present	La hora YouTuber	Los 40	Collaborator

== Personal life ==
She is in a relationship with Italian Francesco Pozzi with whom she has a son.
