= Neox Fan Awards 2015 =

Spanish entertainment awards ceremony

4th Neox Fan Awards
- Date: October 28, 2015
- Site: Palacio Municipal de Congresos, Madrid
- Hosted by: Anna Simon and Miki Nadal
- Organized by: Atresmedia

Television coverage
- Channel: Neox
- Ratings: 2.5%

This was the fourth and last edition of the Neox Fan Awards, created in Spain by Atresmedia with the sponsorship of The Coca-Cola Company's Fanta, for teenage audiences to honor the best of the year in television, films, music and sports. The show featured musical performances by Fifth Harmony, Dvicio, Abraham Mateo and Gemeliers.

== Awards ==
=== Film ===
Best Spanish film actress
Winner	Finalists	Eliminated before final round	
Charlotte Vega - El club de los incomprendidos	Clara Lago - Ahora o nunca; Michelle Calvó - El club de los incomprendidos; Úrsula Corberó - Cómo sobrevivir a una despedida; Blanca Suárez - Perdiendo el Norte	6th	María Valverde - Ahora o nunca
Charlotte Vega - El club de los incomprendidos	Clara Lago - Ahora o nunca; Michelle Calvó - El club de los incomprendidos; Úrsula Corberó - Cómo sobrevivir a una despedida; Blanca Suárez - Perdiendo el Norte	7th	Ana Fernández - Solo química
Charlotte Vega - El club de los incomprendidos	Clara Lago - Ahora o nunca; Michelle Calvó - El club de los incomprendidos; Úrsula Corberó - Cómo sobrevivir a una despedida; Blanca Suárez - Perdiendo el Norte	8th	Natalia de Molina - Cómo sobrevivir a una despedida
Charlotte Vega - El club de los incomprendidos	Clara Lago - Ahora o nunca; Michelle Calvó - El club de los incomprendidos; Úrsula Corberó - Cómo sobrevivir a una despedida; Blanca Suárez - Perdiendo el Norte	9th	Leticia Dolera - Requisitos para ser una persona normal
Charlotte Vega - El club de los incomprendidos	Clara Lago - Ahora o nunca; Michelle Calvó - El club de los incomprendidos; Úrsula Corberó - Cómo sobrevivir a una despedida; Blanca Suárez - Perdiendo el Norte	10th	Marta Etura - Sexo fácil, películas tristes
Best Spanish film actor
Winner	Finalists	Eliminated before final round	
Alex Maruny - El club de los incomprendidos	Dani Rovira - Ahora o nunca; Patrick Criado - El club de los incomprendidos; Yon González - Perdiendo el Norte; Maxi Iglesias - Asesinos inocentes	6th	Santiago Segura - Torrente 5: Operación Eurovegas
Alex Maruny - El club de los incomprendidos	Dani Rovira - Ahora o nunca; Patrick Criado - El club de los incomprendidos; Yon González - Perdiendo el Norte; Maxi Iglesias - Asesinos inocentes	7th	Julián López - Perdiendo el Norte
Alex Maruny - El club de los incomprendidos	Dani Rovira - Ahora o nunca; Patrick Criado - El club de los incomprendidos; Yon González - Perdiendo el Norte; Maxi Iglesias - Asesinos inocentes	8th	Quim Gutiérrez - Sexo fácil, películas tristes
Alex Maruny - El club de los incomprendidos	Dani Rovira - Ahora o nunca; Patrick Criado - El club de los incomprendidos; Yon González - Perdiendo el Norte; Maxi Iglesias - Asesinos inocentes	9th	Alejo Sauras - Solo química
Alex Maruny - El club de los incomprendidos	Dani Rovira - Ahora o nunca; Patrick Criado - El club de los incomprendidos; Yon González - Perdiendo el Norte; Maxi Iglesias - Asesinos inocentes	10th	Brays Efe - Cómo sobrevivir a una despedida
Best Spanish film
Winner	Finalists	Eliminated before final round	
El club de los incomprendidos	Ahora o nunca; Perdiendo el Norte; Marshland; Cómo sobrevivir a una despedida	6th	Torrente 5: Operación Eurovegas
El club de los incomprendidos	Ahora o nunca; Perdiendo el Norte; Marshland; Cómo sobrevivir a una despedida	7th	Asesinos inocentes
El club de los incomprendidos	Ahora o nunca; Perdiendo el Norte; Marshland; Cómo sobrevivir a una despedida	8th	Requisitos para ser una persona normal
El club de los incomprendidos	Ahora o nunca; Perdiendo el Norte; Marshland; Cómo sobrevivir a una despedida	9th	Sexo fácil, películas tristes
El club de los incomprendidos	Ahora o nunca; Perdiendo el Norte; Marshland; Cómo sobrevivir a una despedida	10th	Purgatorio

=== Music ===
Best group of the year
Winner	Finalists	Eliminated before final round	
Gemeliers	Lérica; Auryn; Sweet California; Dvicio	6th	Crítika y Saik
Gemeliers	Lérica; Auryn; Sweet California; Dvicio	7th	Amelie
Gemeliers	Lérica; Auryn; Sweet California; Dvicio	8th	Clover
Gemeliers	Lérica; Auryn; Sweet California; Dvicio	9th	Bromas Aparte
Gemeliers	Lérica; Auryn; Sweet California; Dvicio	10th	El Viaje de Elliot
Best solo act of the year
Winner	Finalists	Eliminated before final round	
Abraham Mateo	Melendi; Xuso Jones; Xriz; María Parrado	6th	India Martínez
Abraham Mateo	Melendi; Xuso Jones; Xriz; María Parrado	7th	David Bisbal
Abraham Mateo	Melendi; Xuso Jones; Xriz; María Parrado	8th	Pablo López
Abraham Mateo	Melendi; Xuso Jones; Xriz; María Parrado	9th	Paula Rojo
Abraham Mateo	Melendi; Xuso Jones; Xriz; María Parrado	10th	Vanesa Martín
Hit song of the year
Winner	Finalists	Eliminated before final round	
Dvicio - Enamórate	Abraham Mateo & CD9 - Para siempre; Calum - Hey Babe; Nicky Jam & Enrique Iglesias - El perdón; Gemeliers - Grandes	6th	Dasoul - Él no te da
Dvicio - Enamórate	Abraham Mateo & CD9 - Para siempre; Calum - Hey Babe; Nicky Jam & Enrique Iglesias - El perdón; Gemeliers - Grandes	7th	Pablo López - El mundo
Dvicio - Enamórate	Abraham Mateo & CD9 - Para siempre; Calum - Hey Babe; Nicky Jam & Enrique Iglesias - El perdón; Gemeliers - Grandes	8th	Sofía Reyes & Wisin - Muévelo
Dvicio - Enamórate	Abraham Mateo & CD9 - Para siempre; Calum - Hey Babe; Nicky Jam & Enrique Iglesias - El perdón; Gemeliers - Grandes	9th	Paula Rojo - Miedo a querer
Dvicio - Enamórate	Abraham Mateo & CD9 - Para siempre; Calum - Hey Babe; Nicky Jam & Enrique Iglesias - El perdón; Gemeliers - Grandes	10th	Lucy Paradise - EIO
Best new act of the year
Winner	Finalists	Eliminated before final round	
Calum	Lérica; Benjamin; David Parejo; Dasoul	6th	Sofía Reyes
Calum	Lérica; Benjamin; David Parejo; Dasoul	7th	Bromas Aparte
Calum	Lérica; Benjamin; David Parejo; Dasoul	8th	Lucy Paradise
Calum	Lérica; Benjamin; David Parejo; Dasoul	9th	María Sagana
Calum	Lérica; Benjamin; David Parejo; Dasoul	10th	Enric Verdaguer

=== Television ===
Best television programme
Winner	Finalists	Eliminated before final round	
El Hormiguero	Zapeando; ¡Ahora caigo!; El club de la comedia; Pekín Express	6th	Al rincón de pensar
El Hormiguero	Zapeando; ¡Ahora caigo!; El club de la comedia; Pekín Express	7th	¡Boom!
El Hormiguero	Zapeando; ¡Ahora caigo!; El club de la comedia; Pekín Express	8th	Pesadilla en la cocina
El Hormiguero	Zapeando; ¡Ahora caigo!; El club de la comedia; Pekín Express	9th	Top Chef
El Hormiguero	Zapeando; ¡Ahora caigo!; El club de la comedia; Pekín Express	10th	Casados a primera vista
Best television series
Winner	Finalists	Eliminated before final round	
Allí abajo	The Simpsons; Vis a vis; Modern Family; Velvet	6th	Bajo sospecha
Allí abajo	The Simpsons; Vis a vis; Modern Family; Velvet	7th	The Big Bang Theory
Allí abajo	The Simpsons; Vis a vis; Modern Family; Velvet	8th	Sin identidad
Allí abajo	The Simpsons; Vis a vis; Modern Family; Velvet	9th	The Refugees
Allí abajo	The Simpsons; Vis a vis; Modern Family; Velvet	10th	Retorno a Lilifor
Best television actress
Winner	Finalists	Eliminated before final round	
Paula Echevarría - Velvet	María León - Allí abajo; Maggie Civantos - Vis a vis; Megan Montaner - Sin identidad; Marta Hazas - Velvet	6th	Berta Vázquez - Vis a vis
Paula Echevarría - Velvet	María León - Allí abajo; Maggie Civantos - Vis a vis; Megan Montaner - Sin identidad; Marta Hazas - Velvet	7th	Alba Flores - Vis a vis
Paula Echevarría - Velvet	María León - Allí abajo; Maggie Civantos - Vis a vis; Megan Montaner - Sin identidad; Marta Hazas - Velvet	8th	Verónica Sánchez - Sin identidad
Paula Echevarría - Velvet	María León - Allí abajo; Maggie Civantos - Vis a vis; Megan Montaner - Sin identidad; Marta Hazas - Velvet	9th	Najwa Nimri - Vis a vis
Paula Echevarría - Velvet	María León - Allí abajo; Maggie Civantos - Vis a vis; Megan Montaner - Sin identidad; Marta Hazas - Velvet	10th	Adriana Torrebejano - El secreto de Puente Viejo
Best television actor
Winner	Finalists	Eliminated before final round	
Jon Plazaola - Allí abajo	Yon González - Bajo sospecha; Miguel Ángel Silvestre - Velvet; Salva Reina - Allí abajo; Adrián Lastra - Velvet	6th	Roberto Enríquez - Vis a vis
Jon Plazaola - Allí abajo	Yon González - Bajo sospecha; Miguel Ángel Silvestre - Velvet; Salva Reina - Allí abajo; Adrián Lastra - Velvet	7th	Eloy Azorín - Sin identidad
Jon Plazaola - Allí abajo	Yon González - Bajo sospecha; Miguel Ángel Silvestre - Velvet; Salva Reina - Allí abajo; Adrián Lastra - Velvet	8th	Miguel Ángel Muñoz - Sin identidad
Jon Plazaola - Allí abajo	Yon González - Bajo sospecha; Miguel Ángel Silvestre - Velvet; Salva Reina - Allí abajo; Adrián Lastra - Velvet	9th	Daniel Grao - Sin identidad
Jon Plazaola - Allí abajo	Yon González - Bajo sospecha; Miguel Ángel Silvestre - Velvet; Salva Reina - Allí abajo; Adrián Lastra - Velvet	10th	Will Keen - The Refugees

=== Neox awards ===
LOL face of the year
Winner	Finalists	Eliminated before final round	
Arturo Valls - ¡Ahora caigo!	Frank Blanco - Zapeando; Pablo Ibáñez, "El Hombre de Negro" - El Hormiguero; Pablo Motos - El Hormiguero; Cristina Pedroche - Pekín Express	6th	Risto Mejide - Al rincón de pensar
Arturo Valls - ¡Ahora caigo!	Frank Blanco - Zapeando; Pablo Ibáñez, "El Hombre de Negro" - El Hormiguero; Pablo Motos - El Hormiguero; Cristina Pedroche - Pekín Express	7th	Alexandra Jiménez - El club de la comedia
Arturo Valls - ¡Ahora caigo!	Frank Blanco - Zapeando; Pablo Ibáñez, "El Hombre de Negro" - El Hormiguero; Pablo Motos - El Hormiguero; Cristina Pedroche - Pekín Express	8th	Juanra Bonet - ¡Boom!
Arturo Valls - ¡Ahora caigo!	Frank Blanco - Zapeando; Pablo Ibáñez, "El Hombre de Negro" - El Hormiguero; Pablo Motos - El Hormiguero; Cristina Pedroche - Pekín Express	9th	Berto Romero - En el aire
Arturo Valls - ¡Ahora caigo!	Frank Blanco - Zapeando; Pablo Ibáñez, "El Hombre de Negro" - El Hormiguero; Pablo Motos - El Hormiguero; Cristina Pedroche - Pekín Express	10th	Joaquín Reyes - El Intermedio
OMG moment of the year
Winner	Finalists	Eliminated before final round	
Alex Maruny & Charlotte Vega - El club de los incomprendidos	Jon Plazaola & María León - Allí abajo; Cristina Pedroche - Campanadas 2014 de laSexta; Michelle Calvó - El club de los incomprendidos; Paula Echevarría & Miguel Ángel Silvestre - Velvet	6th	Maggie Civantos & Berta Vázquez - Vis a vis
Alex Maruny & Charlotte Vega - El club de los incomprendidos	Jon Plazaola & María León - Allí abajo; Cristina Pedroche - Campanadas 2014 de laSexta; Michelle Calvó - El club de los incomprendidos; Paula Echevarría & Miguel Ángel Silvestre - Velvet	7th	Blanca Romero & Yon González - Bajo sospecha
Alex Maruny & Charlotte Vega - El club de los incomprendidos	Jon Plazaola & María León - Allí abajo; Cristina Pedroche - Campanadas 2014 de laSexta; Michelle Calvó - El club de los incomprendidos; Paula Echevarría & Miguel Ángel Silvestre - Velvet	8th	Boris Izaguirre & Frank Blanco - Zapeando
Alex Maruny & Charlotte Vega - El club de los incomprendidos	Jon Plazaola & María León - Allí abajo; Cristina Pedroche - Campanadas 2014 de laSexta; Michelle Calvó - El club de los incomprendidos; Paula Echevarría & Miguel Ángel Silvestre - Velvet	9th	Adryen Mehdi - Vis a vis
Alex Maruny & Charlotte Vega - El club de los incomprendidos	Jon Plazaola & María León - Allí abajo; Cristina Pedroche - Campanadas 2014 de laSexta; Michelle Calvó - El club de los incomprendidos; Paula Echevarría & Miguel Ángel Silvestre - Velvet	10th	Verónica Sánchez & Miguel Ángel Muñoz - Sin identidad
Internet breaker of the year
Winner	Finalists	Eliminated before final round	
Michelle Jenner & Hugo Silva	Carlos Latre; Paula Echevarría & David Bustamante; Cristina Pedroche & David Muñoz; Arturo Valls	6th	Nuria Roca
Michelle Jenner & Hugo Silva	Carlos Latre; Paula Echevarría & David Bustamante; Cristina Pedroche & David Muñoz; Arturo Valls	7th	Santiago Segura
Michelle Jenner & Hugo Silva	Carlos Latre; Paula Echevarría & David Bustamante; Cristina Pedroche & David Muñoz; Arturo Valls	8th	Julián López & "Bartolo"
Michelle Jenner & Hugo Silva	Carlos Latre; Paula Echevarría & David Bustamante; Cristina Pedroche & David Muñoz; Arturo Valls	9th	Berto Romero
Michelle Jenner & Hugo Silva	Carlos Latre; Paula Echevarría & David Bustamante; Cristina Pedroche & David Muñoz; Arturo Valls	10th	Ernesto Sevilla

=== Fanta awards ===
Established in the Wild (Best YouTuber)
Winner	Finalists	Eliminated before final round	
ElRubius	AuronPlay; JPelirrojo; YellowMellow; Mangel	6th	Rebeca Terán
ElRubius	AuronPlay; JPelirrojo; YellowMellow; Mangel	7th	Sr. Cheeto
ElRubius	AuronPlay; JPelirrojo; YellowMellow; Mangel	8th	Mister Jäger
ElRubius	AuronPlay; JPelirrojo; YellowMellow; Mangel	9th	Loulogio
ElRubius	AuronPlay; JPelirrojo; YellowMellow; Mangel	10th	David Suárez
