= Alison Parker =

Alison Parker may refer to:

- Alison Parker (Melrose Place), character in the television series Melrose Place
- Alison Parker, a main character of the first season of the TV show Money Heist
- Alison Bailey Parker (1991–2015), American television news reporter murdered in 2015 during a live interview
