= The Corpse of Anna Fritz =

2015 film by Hèctor Hernández Vicens

- International release poster
- Spanish: El cadáver de Anna Fritz
- Directed by: Hèctor Hernández Vicens
- Written by: Hèctor Hernández Vicens: Isaac P. Creus
- Starring: Alba Ribas; Cristian Valencia; Bernat Saumell; Albert Carbó
- Cinematography: Ricard Canyellas
- Edited by: Alberto Bernad
- Music by: Tolo Prats
- Release dates: 15 March 2015 (SXSW); 30 October 2015 (Spain)
- Running time: 75 minutes
- Country: Spain
- Language: Spanish
- Box office: €360,000

The Corpse of Anna Fritz (Spanish: El cadáver de Anna Fritz) is a 2015 Spanish thriller film co-written and directed by Hèctor Hernández Vicens. It premiered at the South by Southwest film festival in Austin, Texas on 15 March 2015.

The cast of the movie includes Alba Ribas, Bernat Saumell, Cristian Valencia, Albert Carbó, and Nico Avila.

== Plot ==
Pau works as an orderly at a hospital, a job that gives him the opportunity to watch the bodies of young women that are brought to the hospital's morgue. One day he is stunned when the body of Anna Fritz, a beautiful and desirable actress, arrives. Pau cannot resist taking a picture and sending it to one of his friends, Ivan, who quickly arrives with Javi, his other friend, at the morgue to view Anna's nude body.

Ivan ponders out loud if it is possible to rape a corpse and Pau replies that saliva must be used for lubrication. When asked whether he knows this from past experience, Pau confesses he has raped the corpse of a 17- or 18-year-old girl. Ivan soon decides that he wants to rape Anna's corpse and begins raping it, prompting Pau to suggest that he take a turn after Ivan. Javi is disgusted when they encourage him to takes a turn. During Pau's act of necrophilia, Anna returns to life and opens her eyes in terror, immobile. Pau screams when he belatedly realizes this. The others return to the room.

The men are faced with two choices: They can either report Anna's revival and face rape charges, as there was no way Anna could have consented to sex, or they can murder her. While Pau and Ivan both want to hide their crime, Javi pushes for them to save Anna and take responsibility for what they have done. The three men argue and Ivan unintentionally kills Javi. Ivan is set on killing Anna and convinces Pau that he would be an accessory to Javi's murder, and that Anna would not stay silent if left alive.

They decide to smother her with bunched up sheets so no mark is left on her body. While Ivan disposes of the evidence, Pau cleans Anna's body and covers her in a white sheet. As he is about to leave, Pau hears Anna breathe and tells her to pretend to be dead. Ivan returns and they both leave the room. As they are about to get on the elevator, Ivan checks his wallet and realizes he forgot his card in the morgue. Pau unsuccessfully tries to convince him to leave rather than get his card, saying he will pick it up the next day. Ivan opens the door to see Anna putting on a hospital gown.

Ivan furiously starts to choke Pau, accusing him of conspiring to blame all of it on him. He finally stops, announcing that he does not care anymore if Pau wants to go to jail. Anna sneaks up behind him and stabs him twice. He bleeds to death from the wound in his neck. Pau cries, saying that Ivan had already said he would leave. Silent, Anna repeatedly stabs Pau. Anna is then seen staring off with tears in her eyes and blood spatter on her face.

== Cast ==
- Alba Ribas as Anna Fritz
- Bernat Saumell as Javi
- Cristian Valencia as Ivan
- Albert Carbó as Pau
- Nico Avila as the doctor

== Release ==
The film had its world premiere at the South by Southwest film festival on 15 March 2015. It was later released in Spain on 30 October 2015, where it made €360,000 at the box office and was viewed an estimated 9,000 times. In February 2016, director Hèctor Hernández Vicens discovered that his film was popular in the Philippines, where it was illegally viewed or downloaded between 5 and 7 million times via outlets such as Facebook and YouTube. This prompted the film crew to seek out legal counsel in an attempt to stop the illegal distribution. They have since managed to get an upload of the film deleted from YouTube. Due to the film's popularity overseas, the film's crew and producers are seeking to launch an advertising and screening campaign in the Philippines.

== Reception ==
The International Business Times praised certain elements such as lighting, while stating that they felt it would have worked better as a short film. Cliff Wheatley at IGN singled out Alba Ribas's performance, the story's tense subject matter and denouement, though he felt that its 76-minute runtime was overlong, "because it relies so heavily on the shock value of the subject matter and doesn't bother to deliver any inkling of a likable character".

Review aggregator website Rotten Tomatoes gives the film a 67% rating based on nine critics, and an average of 6.4/10.

== See also ==
- List of Spanish films of 2015
- Husma, a 2019 Sinhala film with a similar plot
