= María Parrado =

Spanish singer

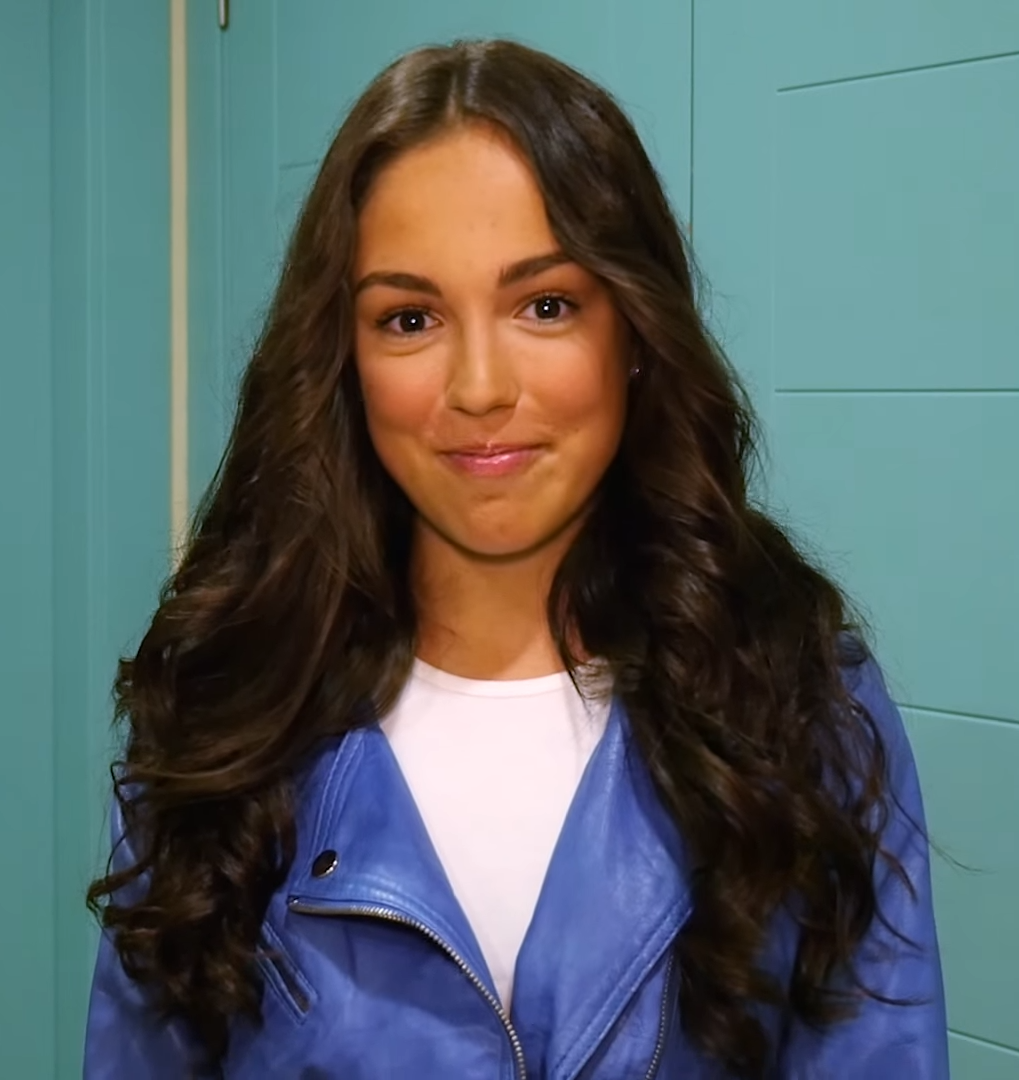
- María Parrado in 2015

Background information
- Born: 28 April 2001 (age 24); Chiclana de la Frontera, Andalusia, Spain
- Genres: Pop
- Occupation: Singer
- Years active: 2013–present
- Labels: Universal Music Spain
- Website: mariaparrado.com

María Dolores Parrado Ávila (born 28 April 2001) is a Spanish singer. She is best known as the winner of the first season of The Voice Kids Spain in 2014. She has since released two albums and has been nominated for a 2017 Kids' Choice Award.

== Biography ==
At the age of eight she participated in the TV contest Cántame una canción (on the Spanish channel Telecinco). After that she also was selected to perform on the TV show Menuda noche on Canal Sur.

In 2014, at the age of 12, she won the first season of La Voz Kids, the Spanish version of The Voice Kids (broadcast by Telecinco). She was part of Malú's team on the show.

The two songs that she sang on the final day of La Voz Kids ("Quién" by Pablo Alborán in the semifinal of nine competitors and "Lucía" by Joan Manuel Serrat in the final of three), were promptly released as singles and appeared on the Spanish national chart.

A few weeks later María Parrado released her debut album, produced by Universal Music Spain and titled simply María Parrado. It soon reached number 2 on the Spanish national album chart. The album spent 46 consecutive weeks on the chart.

Later in the year, she recorded songs for the Spanish-language version of the 2014 American musical film Annie. She performed Spanish versions of the songs sung by Quvenzhané Wallis (Annie) in the original English version. The movie was released to Spanish cinemas in January 2015.

In June 2015, she released her second album, titled April, which entered the Spanish national album chart at its peak position of number six and spent 17 consecutive weeks on the chart.

In 2016 she became a jury member on a new talent show titled Fenómeno Fan, broadcast on Canal Sur.

She also performed the Spanish version of the main theme of the Disney animated feature Moana that hit cinemas in Spain on 2 December 2016.

She has been nominated for a 2017 Kids' Choice Award for Best Spanish Music Act.

In 2018, she released her third album, titled Alas. It contained a song written by her.

== Family ==
Her mother, Mariló Ávila, is a psychologist. Her father, Salvador Parrado Díaz, died suddenly on February 16, 2017, aged 45. Her paternal grandfather is in the construction materials business, his company is the official distributor of Porcelanosa and of all the major local construction companies.

== Discography ==
=== Albums ===
Title	Album details	Charts
Title	Album details	SPA
María Parrado	Released: 2014; Label: Universal Music Spain	2
Abril	Released: 2015; Label: Universal Music Spain	6
Alas	Released: 6 April 2018; Label: Universal Music Spain	6
Conmigo	Released: 13 February 2022; Label: Universal Music / Concert Music	38

== Awards and nominations ==
Year	Award	Category	Result
2015	Neox Fan Awards 2015	Best Solo Act of the Year	Finalist
2017	Nickelodeon Kids' Choice Awards 2017	Favorite Spanish Music Act	Nominated
