= Off Course (film) =

- Theatrical release poster
- Directed by: Nacho García Velilla
- Screenplay by: Nacho García Velilla; Oriol Capel; David S. Olivas; Antonio Sánchez
- Produced by: Nacho García Velilla; Mercedes Gamero
- Starring: Yon González; Julián López; Blanca Suárez; José Sacristán; Miki Esparbé; Úrsula Corberó; Malena Alterio; Younes Bachir; Javier Cámara; Carmen Machi
- Cinematography: Isaac Vila
- Edited by: Ángel Hernández Zoido
- Music by: Baris Aryay; Juanjo Javierre
- Production company: Atresmedia Cine
- Distributed by: Warner Bros. Pictures
- Release date: 6 March 2015 (Spain)
- Running time: 104 minutes
- Country: Spain
- Languages: Spanish; German
- Box office: €10.1 million

Off Course (Spanish: Perdiendo el norte) is a 2015 Spanish comedy film directed by Nacho G. Velilla. The movie touches on the topics of youth unemployment and underemployment, economic emigration, estrangement (from family), language barriers, Alzheimer's, infertility and other subjects. It is an Atresmedia Cine production.

== Plot ==
Overeducated, underemployed professionals Hugo (Yon González, trained in the financial sector) and Braulio (Julián López, a scientist) are lured to migrate to Berlin by a TV programme showing an interview with an émigré who describes Germany as employment paradise. Hugo literally runs into Carla (Blanca Suárez), a fellow Spaniard who has finally broken through as a professional after a similar struggle with underemployment, within minutes of arriving in Berlin. Hugo and Braulio room with Carla and her drug-dealing slacker brother Rafa (Miki Esparbé), sharing a building with an older Spanish expatriate, Andrés (José Sacristán), who sees the struggles of his generation echoed in Hugo and Braulio.

A dispiriting, fruitless search for work in their trained professions ensues, as the language barrier proves insurmountable. Hugo and Braulio are eventually (under)employed by Hakan (Younes Bachir) in his Turkish café along with Rafa. After his father Próspero (Javier Cámara) loses his job, Hugo ends up sending most of his earnings (accompanied by lies about his employment status and importance) back to Spain, where his father, his mother Beni (Carmen Machi), and his fiancée Nadia (Úrsula Corberó) make a spontaneous decision after hearing his glowing stories to visit him in Berlin. Carla and Hugo have grown close after an initial mutual dislike, with Carla confessing she seems to always end up as "the other woman" in a relationship. Carla relates a story of how she attended a friend's wedding alone, since her boyfriend at the time had another commitment, finding out only at the wedding that said commitment was marrying her friend.

In a subplot, Hakan and his wife Marisol (Malena Alterio) are unable to conceive a child, despite Marisol's desperation. The doctor informs them that they will undergo tests to determine if one of them is sterile. While attempting to sell his sperm to fund German language lessons, Braulio encounters Marisol at the fertility clinic, and she suggests that she could pay for his lessons if he donates sperm "without the middleman." Although she successfully conceives a child, Hakan soon learns that he is sterile and does not believe that he could have fathered Marisol's child.

Another subplot revolves around the irascible Andrés, who is revealed to have an estranged daughter living in Spain. During the course of the movie, he is diagnosed with Alzheimer's disease.

When Hugo's parents and fiancée visit him in Berlin, Rafa, Carla, Hakan and Marisol play different roles as Hugo's employees. Carla is introduced as Hugo's secretary, and Nadia is introduced as Hugo's fiancée. Upon learning this, Carla believes that Hugo is no different than the other men she has dated, seeing herself as "the other woman", and angrily reveals the truth behind Hugo's employment. Meanwhile, Hakan catches Marisol congratulating Braulio for successfully fathering a child and cuts off contact with both of them.

Hugo returns to Spain to work for Nadia's father while they prepare for the wedding. Hugo finds Andrés's daughter and informs her of her father's diagnosis, telling her that the wrong decision can cause a lifetime of regret. On the day of the wedding, Próspero gives Hugo a speech telling him he should marry for love, not money; emboldened, Hugo jilts Nadia at the altar and flies to Berlin, where he finds Carla jogging amongst thousands in the Berlin Marathon. Hugo and Carla reconcile, as do Hakan and Marisol, who is forced to give birth in the café's delivery van (with Braulio and Andrés attending) on the way to the hospital, as they are caught in marathon-induced traffic.

As the movie closes, Braulio wins a scientific fellowship to China, Hugo's parents' home is repossessed, Carla and Hugo are living together in Berlin with their "extended" family of Hakan, Marisol, and their daughter; and Andrés's daughter has come to Berlin to care for her father.

== Cast ==
- Yon González as Hugo
- Julián López as Braulio
- Blanca Suárez as Carla
- José Sacristán as Andrés
- Miki Esparbé as Rafa
- Úrsula Corberó as Nadia
- Malena Alterio as Marisol
- Younes Bachir as Hakan
- Javier Cámara as Próspero
- Carmen Machi as Beni

== Reception ==
The film debuted to receipts of €1.25 million over its opening weekend. Gross receipts reached $11.5 million by June 2015.

== Awards and nominations ==
Awards	Category	Nominated	Result
Neox Fan Awards 2015	Best Spanish film		Nominated
Neox Fan Awards 2015	Best Spanish film actress	Blanca Suárez	Nominated
Neox Fan Awards 2015	Best Spanish film actor	Yon González	Nominated

== See also ==
- List of Spanish films of 2015
