= Husma =

2019 Sinhala drama thriller film

The Breath
- Directed by: Sudesh Wasantha Pieris
- Written by: Sudesh Wasantha Pieris
- Based on: The Corpse of Anna Fritz by Hèctor Hernández Vicens and Isaac P. Creus
- Produced by: Nihal Wikramasinghe
- Starring: Pubudu Chathuranga; Dasun Pathirana; Isuru Lokuhettiarachchi
- Cinematography: Gamini Moragollagama
- Edited by: Anura Bandara
- Music by: Keshan Perera
- Production company: FineVision Group
- Distributed by: Nilkamal Film
- Release date: 20 September 2019
- Running time: 150 minutes
- Country: Sri Lanka
- Language: Sinhala

Husma (Sinhala: හුස්ම), is a 2019 Sri Lankan Sinhala drama thriller film directed by Sudesh Wasantha Pieris and produced by Deshan Wikramasinghe for 'Nilkamal' Films. It stars Pubudu Chathuranga, Dasun Pathirana and Isuru Lokuhettiarachchi along with Chamathka Lakmini and Anjana Premaratne. Music composed by Keshan Perera. The film is a remake of 2015 Spanish film The Corpse of Anna Fritz.

== Plot ==
Kumara works as an orderly at a hospital, a job that gives him the opportunity to watch the bodies of young women brought into the morgue. One day, he is stunned when the body of Tharuka Wijesinghe, a beautiful and desirable actress, arrives. Unable to resist, Kumara takes a picture and sends it to his friend Ruwan, who quickly shows up with their other friend, Namal, to view Tharuka’s nude body.

Ruwan wonders aloud if it is possible to have sex with a corpse. Kumara replies that it is, and when asked whether he knows this from experience, he confesses he once raped the body of a 21-year-old girl. Ruwan soon decides he wants to rape Tharuka’s corpse and begins doing so, prompting Kumara to suggest he take a turn afterward. Disgusted, Namal refuses when they urge him to join.

In the middle of their act of necrophilia, Tharuka suddenly returns to life. Though she cannot move, her eyes open in terror as Kumara is raping her. Realizing this, Kumara screams, and the others rush into the room.

The men are confronted with two choices: report Tharuka’s revival and face rape charges, since there was no way she could have consented, or murder her to cover up their crimes. Kumara and Ruwan lean toward concealment, but Namal dresses Tharuka and reassures her that he will keep her safe. He urges the others to save her and insists they must take responsibility for their actions, for having been slaves to their desires.

The argument escalates, and when Namal tries to leave the morgue, he discovers the doors are locked. Realizing this, he suddenly begins shouting for help. In desperation, Ruwan tries to silence him, and in the struggle lands a punch that sends Namal crashing onto the mortuary floor, splitting his head open.

While Kumara hurriedly mops up the blood, Ruwan drags a barely conscious Namal into an inner room and begins fabricating a story. He takes Namal’s wallet, promising to return it, and pleads with him to say that a gang of thieves attacked him and stole it. But Namal’s condition worsens—he starts fading fast. Ruwan attempts CPR, but Namal succumbs to his injuries. All of this unfolds without Kumara witnessing it.

Without Namal to oppose them, Ruwan is intent on killing Tharuka. He convinces Kumara that he is now an accessory to Namal’s death, and that Tharuka would never stay silent if left alive. While Ruwan goes out to find a garbage bin to dispose of Namal’s body, Tharuka pleads with Kumara. She tells him Ruwan lied about trying to save Namal, appeals to his better nature, and promises to keep silent if he lets her go. She warns that Ruwan will pin everything on him. Kumara silences her with plaster over her mouth, but her words leave him uncertain about Ruwan.

Ruwan returns and decides to smother her with bunched-up sheets so that no marks remain on her body, much to Kumara’s reluctance. Forcing Kumara to hold one end of the sheet so both would be responsible, Ruwan presses down until Tharuka goes limp. Believing her dead, Ruwan disposes of the evidence, while Kumara quietly cleans Tharuka’s body and covers her in a white sheet. Alone with her, he whispers for her to pretend to be dead, revealing he faked the murder.

As they prepare to leave, Ruwan realizes he left his credit card in the morgue. Kumara tries to convince him to leave it and retrieve it the next day, but Ruwan insists. When he opens the door, he sees Tharuka putting on a hospital gown.

Furious, Ruwan assaults Kumara, accusing him of conspiring to pin everything on him. As he beats Kumara, Tharuka sneaks up from behind and stabs Ruwan twice, fatally wounding him in the neck. Kumara breaks down, insisting Ruwan had already said they would leave. Silent, Tharuka turns on Kumara and stabs him to death.

The film ends with Tharuka, blood-spattered and tearful, staring blankly before walking out of the morgue and wandering into the hospital.

== Cast ==
- Dasun Pathirana as Kumara
- Isuru Lokuhettiarachchi as Ruwan
- Pubudu Chathuranga as Namal
- Chamathka Lakmini as Tharuka Wijesinghe
- Anjana Premaratne as mortuary worker
- Mahinda Ihalagama as mortuary
- Nadee Darshani
- Maheshida De Silva
- Amaya Wijeesuriye
- Ahinsa Ranpathum
- Anuththara Dasanayeka
- Anushka Udayangani
- Kanchana Nandhani
- Nirojith Manorathne
- Sunil Mallikarachchi
- Vishwa Lanka as Vishwa (only voice)

== Songs ==
The film consist with only one song.

No.	Title	Lyrics	Singer(s)	Length
1.	"Awarin Nagena"	Bandula Nanayakkarawasam	Uresha Ravihari
