= Fernando Gil (actor) =

Spanish actor (born 1975)

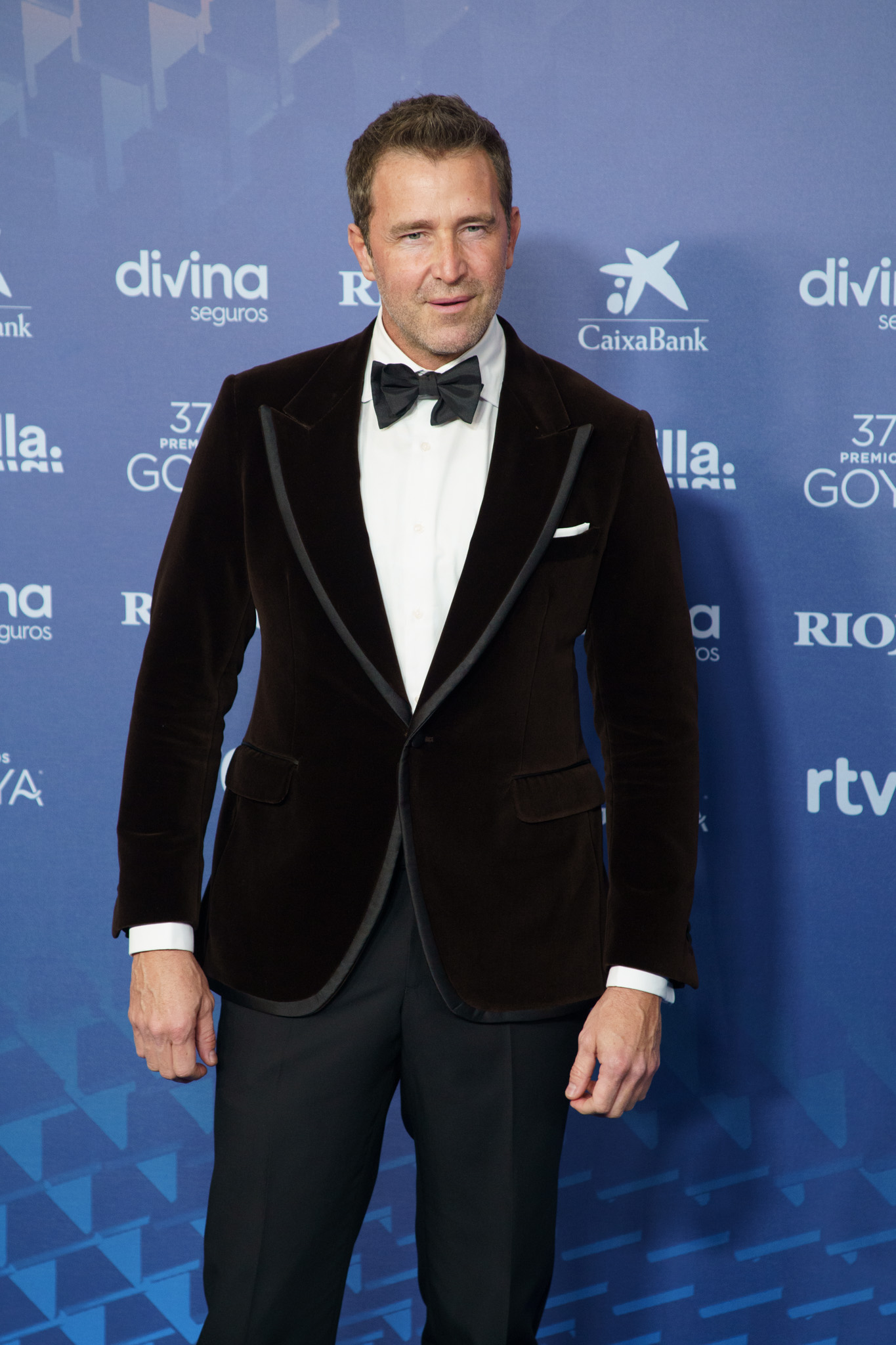
- Gil at the 37th Goya Awards
- Born: Fernando Gil Moreno; 22 February 1975 (age 50); Madrid, Spain
- Occupation: Actor
- Years active: 1997–present

Fernando Gil Moreno (born 22 February 1975) is a Spanish actor known for his roles in television series such as Anclados and Alpha Males. He also worked as a collaborator of late night talk show Noche Hache.

== Life and career ==
Fernando Gil Moreno was born on 22 February 1975 in Madrid. He dropped out of studies in sociology to pursue an acting career, joining the RESAD, from which he also dropped out. He made his feature film debut with a bit part in Juan Antonio Bardem's Resultado final (1997). After appearing in minor parts in several television series, he landed his first main cast television role in Hospital Central, followed by credits in El auténtico Rodrigo Leal, La que se avecina, Los Quién, El Príncipe, Queens: The Virgin and the Martyr, Anclados, and Alpha Males.

He starred as Prince Felipe in miniseries Felipe y Letizia (2010) and as the former's father Juan Carlos I in miniseries El Rey (2014). He also starred as Henry VIII in plays staged in London and Los Angeles.
