= Paranormal Xperience 3D =

- Theatrical release poster
- Spanish: XP3D
- Directed by: Sergi Vizcaíno
- Written by: Daniel Padró
- Produced by: Joaquín Padró; Mar Targarona; Mercedes Gamero
- Starring: Alba Ribas; Úrsula Corberó; Maxi Iglesias; Amaia Salamanca; Óscar Sinela; Luis Fernández
- Production companies: Rodar y Rodar; Antena 3 Films
- Distributed by: Sony Pictures Releasing de España
- Release dates: 9 December 2011 (Courmayeur Film Festival); 28 December 2011 (Spain)
- Running time: 90 minutes
- Country: Spain
- Language: Spanish
- Budget: €3.2 million
- Box office: €2 million

Paranormal Xperience 3D (Spanish: XP3D) is a 2011 slasher horror film, directed by Sergi Vizcaíno, written by Daniel Padró and produced by Mercedes Gamero, Joaquín Padró and Mar Targarona. It was the first Spanish horror film to be shot in 3-D.

It stars Óscar Sinela, Úrsula Corberó, Alba Ribas, Amaia Salamanca, Maxi Iglesias and Luis Fernández "Perla".

The film was produced by Rodar y Rodar and Antena 3 Films.

== Plot ==
Ángela, a psychiatry student who is skeptical of the existence of the paranormal in the world, is forced to investigate an old mining town for the purpose of proving or disproving paranormal activity. Along with her, she is accompanied by her younger sister Diana Whisper, who lends Angela her van, and a few other students. They journey to the town and go through some ancient salt mines. Aware of the danger provided by tampering with the grounds, through the legend of the sadistic Dr. Matarga, they still open a portal to the after life with disastrous consequences. Along the way they each take a journey to the sides of each of them.

== Cast ==
- Amaia Salamanca as Ángela
- Maxi Iglesias as José
- Luis Fernández as Carlos
- Úrsula Corberó as Belén
- Óscar Sinela as Toni
- Alba Ribas as Diana
- Manuel de Blas as Doctor Matarga
- Eduard Farelo – Padre

== See also ==
- List of Spanish films of 2011
