= Alba Ribas =

Spanish actress

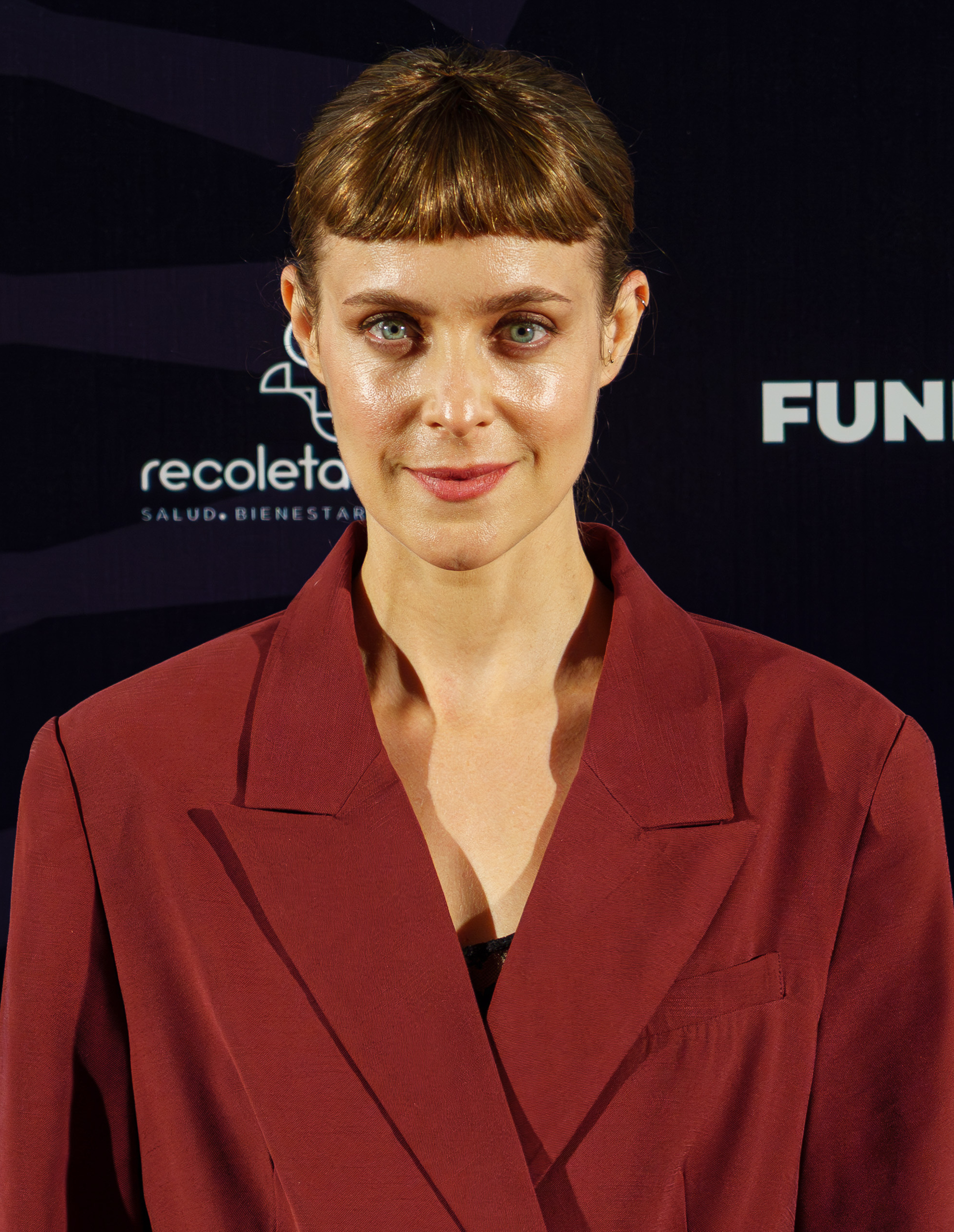
- Ribas in 2025
- Born: Alba Ribas Benaiges; 5 January 1988 (age 37); Catalonia, Spain
- Occupation: Actress
- Known for: The Corpse of Anna Fritz

Alba Ribas Benaiges (born 5 January 1988) is a Spanish actress born in Catalonia. She is best known for her role in The Corpse of Anna Fritz, in which she played the title role. In 2017, she appeared in the Netflix series Las Chicas Del Cable.

== Filmography ==
=== Films ===
- Diary of a Nymphomaniac (2008)
- Paranormal Xperience 3D (2011) as Diana
- Barcelona, noche de verano (2013) as Catherine
- The Corpse of Anna Fritz (2015) as Anna
- 100 metros (2016) as Ariadna
- Te Quiero, Imbécil (2020)

=== Television ===
- El barco (2011-2013) 11 episodes, as Sol / Elena Torres
- El ministerio del tiempo (2016) 1 episode, as Constanza
- Cites (2016) 3 episodes as Sara.
- La que se avecina (2016) 1 episode, Andrea's roommate.
- Cable Girls (2017) 2 episodes, as Jimena. Netflix series
- Derecho a soñar (2019) 130 episodes, as Julia Rojas

=== Music video ===
- El Bosc (2009) from grupo Ix!
- Mudas y Escamas (2014) from grupo Sr. Chinarro
- Ella té un cel als ulls (2015) by Roger Mas
- La Distancia (Un Nuevo Significado) (2021) of Macaco and Rozalén

=== Theater ===
- La ola (2015) as Sherry
