= Lift (2024 film) =

Film by F. Gary Gray

- Release poster
- Directed by: F. Gary Gray
- Written by: Daniel Kunka
- Produced by: Simon Kinberg; Audrey Chon; Matt Reeves; Adam Kassan; Kevin Hart; Brian Smiley
- Starring: Kevin Hart; Gugu Mbatha-Raw; Vincent D'Onofrio; Úrsula Corberó; Billy Magnussen; Jacob Batalon; Jean Reno; Sam Worthington
- Cinematography: Bernhard Jasper
- Edited by: William Yeh
- Music by: Dominic Lewis; Guillaume Roussel
- Production companies: Hartbeat; Kinberg Genre Films; 6th & Idaho Motion Picture Company
- Distributed by: Netflix
- Release date: January 12, 2024
- Running time: 107 minutes
- Country: United States
- Language: English
- Budget: $100 million

Lift is a 2024 American heist comedy film directed by F. Gary Gray and written by Daniel Kunka. The film stars Kevin Hart (also a producer), Gugu Mbatha-Raw, Vincent D'Onofrio, Úrsula Corberó, Billy Magnussen, Jacob Batalon, Jean Reno, and Sam Worthington.

The plot follows an international thief and his crew who team up with an Interpol agent to steal half a billion dollars' worth of gold bullion aboard a passenger flight.

Lift was released on Netflix on January 12, 2024, and has garnered mixed reception.

== Plot ==
Cyrus Whitaker, a renowned international thief, leads a heist crew that consists of Denton, pilot Camila, hacker Mi-Sun, safecracker Magnus, and engineer Luke. They undertake two simultaneous thefts, stealing a Van Gogh painting in London while staging the fake kidnapping of renowned NFT artist N8 in Venice.

The team staged a kidnapping for N8 and Cyrus points out that famous paintings rapidly increase in value after being stolen and he says that his crew stole the Van Gogh painting and sold it in the black market for $20 million to buy N8's NFT. After being "kidnapped", N8's NFT ballooned in value to $89 million. He decides to celebrate with the team after being promised a cut of the money.

Interpol agent Abby Gladwell, a former fling of Cyrus, uncovers evidence implicating Denton in the theft and arrests him. Rather than proceeding with charges against the crew, Abby's superior, Commander Huxley, leverages their legal predicament to force them to help capture billionaire Lars Jorgensen, who intends to make more money by working with the hacking group Leviathan to stage a massive flooding in Europe, allowing him to make billions in profit through stock manipulation.

As Leviathan requires payment in untraceable gold bullion, Jorgensen has arranged for a shipment of gold to be taken from his vault in London and flown to Leviathan's bank in Zürich via a commercial airliner. As part of the deal for clean records for Cyrus and all his members, he insists Abby join the team to provide certain cover for Interpol.

The crew determines they will only be able to steal the gold while the airliner is in mid-air. To do so, they procure a private jet from rich private art collector Molsen that Camila will fly directly underneath the airliner, allowing Mi-Sun to switch the radar signals to make it seem like the plane is still on course while the crew diverts it to a private airfield.

In exchange for loaning his private jet, Cyrus promises Molsen to persuade N8 to make a special NFT art for him. After Magnus cracks the safe and Jorgensen's henchmen are incapacitated, the crew will extract the gold via the jet.

Their timing is complicated when Jorgensen executes a mole in his organization and moves up the delivery date. Nevertheless, the crew is ready on time. After successfully diverting the plane, Jorgensen's henchmen attempt an hijack, resulting in a fight on board the plane.

Magnus, Abby, Cyrus, and Camila are captured. Magnus escapes on the ground, while the remaining three are taken aboard the jet with the gold, headed for Jorgensen's estate in Tuscany.

Desperate for the gold to not reach Jorgensen, Huxley orders the plane to be shot down by NATO. Harry, the crew's contact at air traffic control, works with Camila to get a message to the pilots that there are hostages on board, forcing them to stand down. Another fight between the crew and Jorgensen's henchmen results in the jet crash landing on the grounds of Jorgensen's villa.

Abby, Cyrus, and Camila are captured at gunpoint by Jorgensen, who also executes Leviathan's representative after they decide to cancel the deal. The Carabinieri and Huxley arrive, and Cyrus uses mounted cameras on the jet to show them a recording of Jorgensen murdering the representative. Jorgensen is arrested, while Abby punches Huxley upon learning he authorized the NATO shootdown. She resigns from Interpol and joins Cyrus.

Weeks later, Cyrus reveals to Abby that the crew stole the gold shipment during the heist on the airliner, replacing the actual shipment with iron bars painted to look like gold. Together, the crew recover their gold haul and celebrate their success while Cyrus and Abby rekindle their relationship.

== Cast ==
- Kevin Hart as Cyrus Whitaker, a good thief and leader of the heist crew
- Gugu Mbatha-Raw as Abby Gladwell, an Interpol agent
- Sam Worthington as Huxley, Abby's boss at Interpol
- Vincent D'Onofrio as Denton, an inside man, master of disguise and member of Cyrus's crew
- Úrsula Corberó as Camila, a pilot and member of Cyrus's crew
- Billy Magnussen as Magnus, a safecracker and member of Cyrus's crew
- Yun Jee Kim as Mi-Sun, a hacker and member of Cyrus's crew
- Viveik Kalra as Luke, an engineer and member of Cyrus's crew
- Jean Reno as Lars Jorgensen, a French-Italian banker and terrorist mastermind who is the target of the crew's heist
- Jacob Batalon as N8, an NFT artist
- Burn Gorman as Cormac, Jorgensen's lead henchman
- Paul Anderson as Donal, a henchman of Jorgensen
- David Proud as Harry, the crew's contact at Air Traffic Control
- Jess Liaudin as Arthur Tigue, Interpol's mole inside Jorgensen's organisation

== Production ==
In March 2021, Dan Kunka's spec script Lift was acquired by Netflix, with Simon Kinberg's Genre Pictures and Matt Reeves' 6th & Idaho set to produce. In September, F. Gary Gray was set to direct and Kevin Hart was attached to star and produce.

Principal photography took place from February to May 2022 in Italy and Northern Ireland. Filming occurred in March at Belfast's Harbour Studios. Scenes were shot in Trieste on the Miramare Castle grounds in late May. Shepperton Studios was also utilized for filming.

== Release ==
Lift was released on Netflix on January 12, 2024. It was originally scheduled to be released on August 25, 2023, however, it was postponed as a result of the 2023 SAG-AFTRA strike in the United States. Between its debut and the end of June, the film amassed 129 million views, making it the second most-watched Netflix film for the first half of 2024, behind Damsel.

== Reception ==
On the review aggregator website Rotten Tomatoes, 30% of 70 critics' reviews are positive, with an average rating of 4.6/10. The website's consensus reads: "Lift may be a passable streaming option for viewers seeking mindless entertainment, but that doesn't excuse its thinly written characters or formulaic, haphazardly written story." Metacritic, which uses a weighted average, assigned the film a score of 40 out of 100, based on 21 critics, indicating "mixed or average" reviews.
