= Anclados =

Spanish TV comedy series of 2015

- Genre: Situation comedy
- Country of origin: Spain
- Original language: Spanish
- No. of seasons: 1
- No. of episodes: 8

Production
- Running time: 60 minutes
- Production companies: Globomedia; Mediaset España

Original release
- Network: Telecinco
- Release: 25 May – 13 July 2015

Anclados (Anchored) is a Spanish sitcom produced by Globomedia for Telecinco. The show focuses on the crew of a low-cost cruise ship.

== Cast ==
- Miren Ibarguren : Marga Santaella
- Alfonso Lara : Campillo
- Joaquín Reyes : Mariano
- Úrsula Corberó : Natalia
- Miki Esparbé : Raimundo
- Fernando Gil : Gabriel
- Alberto Jo Lee : Josep Lluís
- Sara Vega : Tere
- Veki G. Velilla : Olivia
- Rossy de Palma : Palmira

== Controversy ==
The show has been criticized for its portrayal of Romani people. In June 2015, the Andalusian Federation of Female Gypsy Students sued the television series for its stereotyping of Roma as criminals.
