= Girl's Night Out (2015 film) =

- Spanish: Cómo sobrevivir a una despedida
- Directed by: Manuela Moreno
- Written by: Susana López Rubio; Manuela Moreno
- Based on: an original story by Núria Valls and Susana López Rubio
- Produced by: Mikel Lejarza; Mercedes Gamero; Núria Valls; Adrián Guerra
- Starring: Natalia de Molina; Úrsula Corberó; María Hervás; Celia de Molina; Brays Efe; Roger Berruezo
- Cinematography: Bet Rourich
- Edited by: Antonio Frutos
- Production companies: Nostromo Films; Atresmedia Cine
- Distributed by: DeAPlaneta
- Release date: 24 April 2015
- Country: Spain
- Language: Spanish
- Box office: €775,821

Girl's Night Out (Spanish: Cómo sobrevivir a una despedida) is a 2015 Spanish comedy film directed by Manuela Moreno which stars Natalia de Molina, Úrsula Corberó, María Hervás, Celia de Molina and Brays Efe.

== Plot ==
Gisela, Nora, Marta, Tania and Mateo are a group of friends who have not achieved what they dreamed of in the past: a good job, a boyfriend like the one from Fifty Shades of Gray and living in a big downtown. As mileuristas, the only thing they have achieved is sharing a flat, working as interns, going out with guys who are allergic to commitment and buying clothes only during sales. But Nora and her friends don't give in to the harsh reality. The first thing they propose is to organize an unforgettable bachelorette party for Gisela, the most responsible of the group. And the chosen destination is Gran Canaria.

== Cast ==
- Celia de Molina as Gisela
- Natalia de Molina as Nora
- Úrsula Corberó as Marta
- María Hervás as Tania
- Brays Efe as Mateo
- Jim Arnold as Roman
- Javier Bódalo as Jonathan
- Daniel Pérez Prada as Lucas
- Roger Berruezo as Rai
- José Lamuño as Yago
- Emma Bunton as herself
- Miki Nadal as talent show host

== Release ==
Distributed by DeAPlaneta, it was theatrically released in Spain on 24 April 2015.

== Reception ==
Pere Vall of Fotogramas rated Girl's Night Out 3 out of 5 stars, considering that the film starts off like a rocket and then has a hard time keeping up.

== See also ==
- List of Spanish films of 2015
