= María Hervás =

Spanish actress (born 1986)

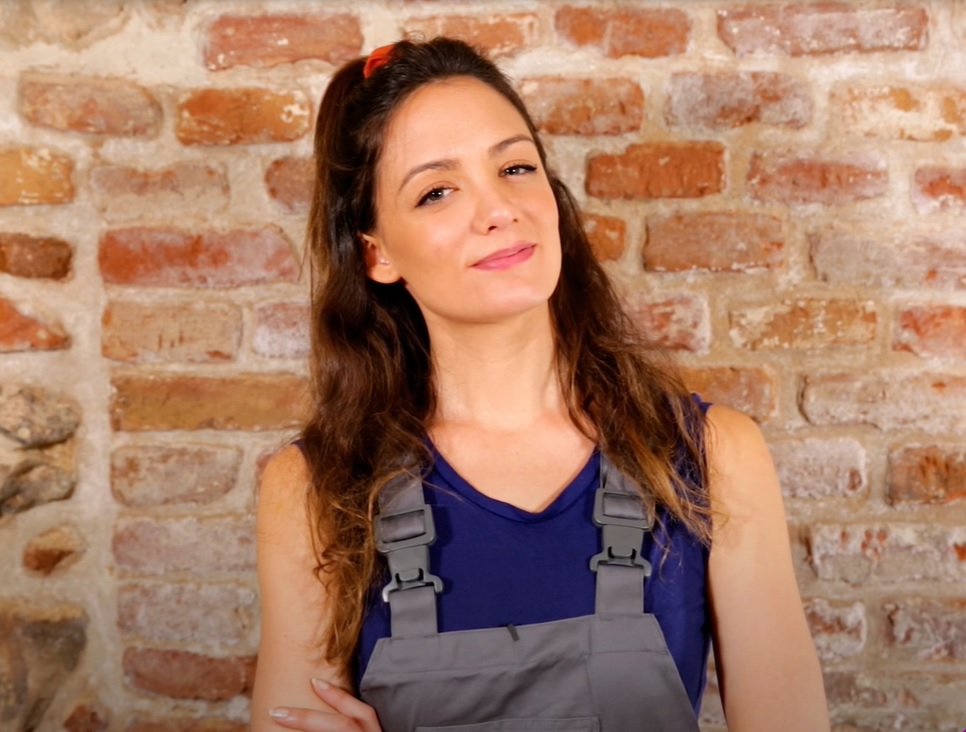
- Born: María Sanz Hervás; March 15, 1987 (age 39); Madrid, Spain
- Occupations: Actress, writer
- Years active: 2007–present

María Sanz Hervás (born March 15, 1987) is a Spanish actress, best known for her performances in television series such as Los Serrano and La que se avecina. She has also received critical acclaim for her stage performances.

== Biography ==
Hervás was born in Madrid in 1987.

In 2007, Hervás landed her debut television role performing Susana in Los Serrano. Her debut in a feature film came with a performance in the 2015 comedy film Cómo Sobrevivir a una Despedida.

She adapted Gary Owen's monologue Iphigenia in Splott into Iphigenia en Vallecas. The play earned her critical acclaim, a Max Award and an Actors and Actresses Union Award. Her other stage credits include Jauría and Confesiones a Alá.

She hosted the ceremony of the 7th Feroz Awards in 2020.

== Filmography ==
=== Television ===
Year	Title	Role	Notes	Ref.
2007	Los Serrano	Susana	Introduced in Season 6	
2010–11	La pecera de Eva	Sonia	Main	
2015	Aquí Paz y después Gloria	Melani	Main	
2015–16	Gym Tony	Miranda Lily	Introduced in Season 3	
2016	Paquita Salas	Camarera	Guest role	
2016	Seis Hermanas	Inés	Recurring	
2015–16	Carlos, Rey Emperador	Margarita de Angulema	Recurring	
2019	La que se avecina	Martina	Introduced in Season 11	
2020	Vergüenza	Maite	Introduced in Season 3	
2019–21	El pueblo	Amaya	Main	
2021	La cocinera de Castamar	Amelia Castro	Main	
2022–present	Machos alfa (Alpha Males)	Daniela Galván	Main	
2022–24	El inmortal (El Inmortal. Gangs of Madrid)	Isabel	Main	

=== Film ===
Year	Title	Role	Notes	Ref.
2015	Cómo Sobrevivir a una Despedida (Girls' Night Out)	Tania		
2017	Es por tu bien (It's for Your Own Good)	Jazmín		
2017	Call TV	Lucía		
2019	Taxi a Gibraltar (Taxi to Gibraltar)	Rosario		
2021	El cover (The Cover)	Moni		
2024	Políticamente incorrectos	Lourdes		
2026	El fantasma de mi mujer (My Wife Is a Ghost)	Julia		

== Awards and nominations ==
Year	Award	Category	Work	Result	Ref.
2018	27th Actors and Actresses Union Awards	Best Leading Actress (stage)	Iphigenia en Vallecas	Won	
2019	22nd Max Awards	Best Leading Actress	Iphigenia en Vallecas	Won	
2019	22nd Max Awards	Best Adapted Stage Play	Iphigenia en Vallecas	Nominated	
2020	70th Fotogramas de Plata	Best Stage Actress	Jauría	Won	
