= Úrsula Corberó =

Spanish actress (born 1989)

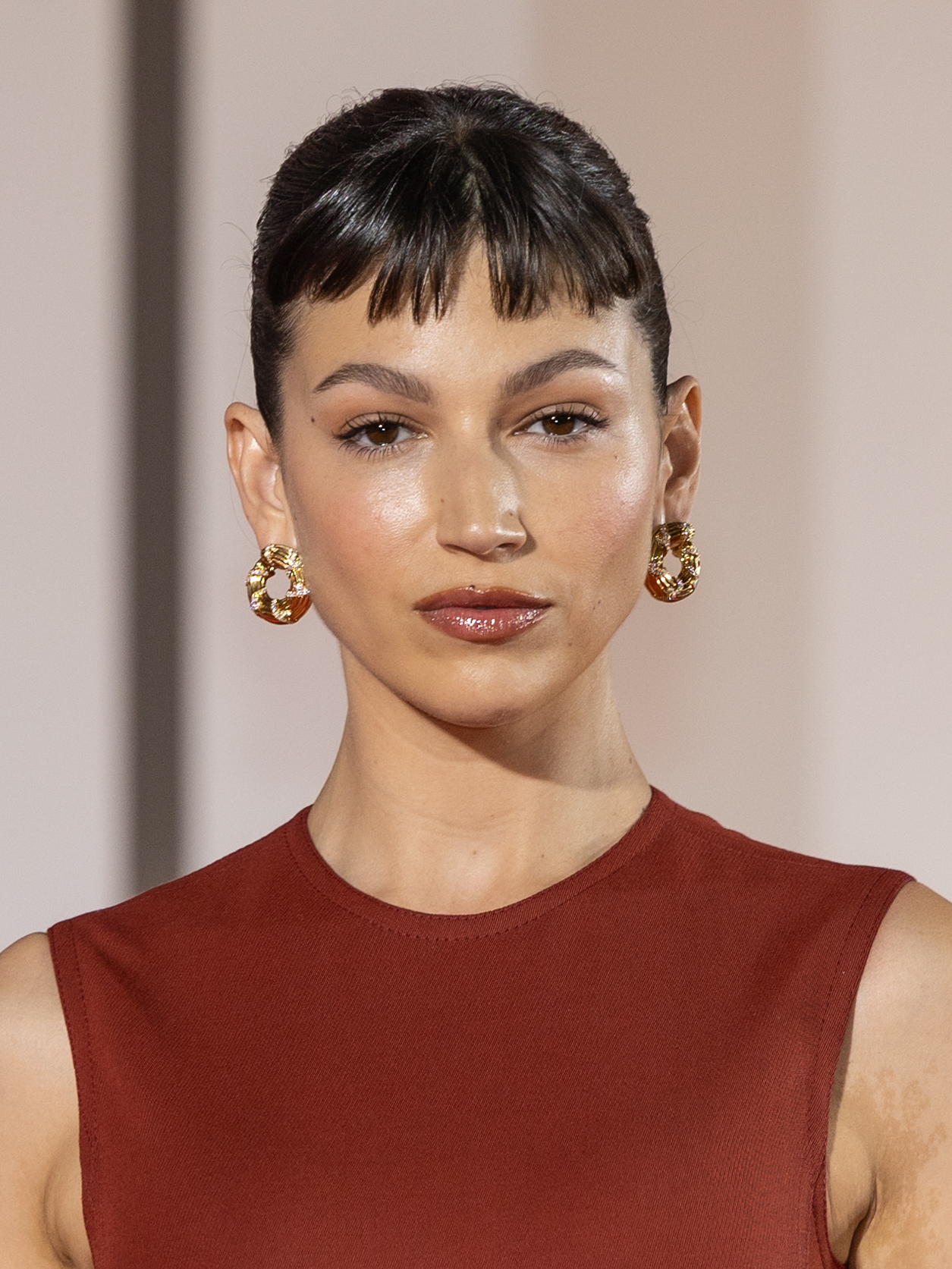
- Corberó in 2024
- Born: Úrsula Corberó Delgado; 11 August 1989 (age 37); Sant Pere de Vilamajor, Catalonia, Spain
- Occupation: Actress
- Years active: 2002–present
- Partner: Chino Darín (2016–present)
- Children: 1

Úrsula Corberó Delgado (born 11 August 1989) is a Spanish actress. She became known in Spain for playing Ruth Gómez in the teen drama series Física o Química (2008–2010), Margarita de Austria in the historical fiction series Isabel (2014), and Marta in the comedy film Girl's Night Out (2015). She gained international recognition for her role as Tokyo in the crime drama series Money Heist (2017–2021) and made her Hollywood debut in the superhero film Snake Eyes (2021).

== Early life ==
Úrsula Corberó Delgado was born in Sant Pere de Vilamajor, province of Barcelona, on 11 August 1989, the daughter of shopkeeper Esther Delgado and carpenter Pedro Corberó. She grew up in Sant Pere de Vilamajor. She has a sister named Mónica. By age six, she already knew she wanted to be an actress and later started acting in commercials. She got her first part at age 13 and took acting classes, as well as flamenco and jazz dance classes.

== Career ==
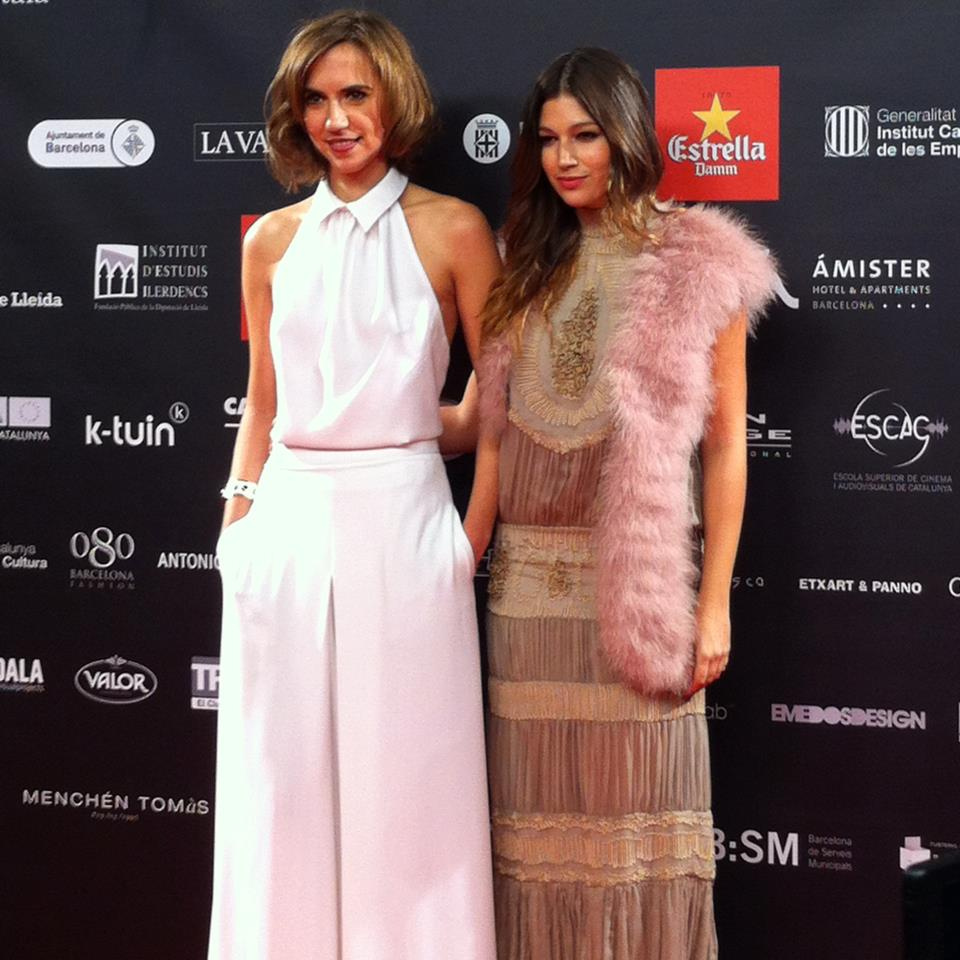
Corberó (right) with Aina Clotet in 2013.

She debuted as Maria in the television series Mirall Trencat in 2002. She appeared as Sara in Ventdelplà in 2005–06, and in the series Cuenta atrás in 2007. In 2008, she portrayed Manuela Portillo in the series El Internado and began working on the Antena 3 television series Física o química until 2010. Her character, Ruth Gomez, suffered from bulimia. The series attracted a lot of controversy but Corberó has been critically acclaimed for her performance.

After leaving Física o Química, in 2011, Corberó landed a main role in Televisión Española's drama series 14 de abril. La República. The show's second season did not air until November 2018 due to political conflicts with the People's Party. The same year, she starred in the horror film XP3D alongside her Física o Química co-star and friend Maxi Iglesias. Despite an important promotion campaign, the film failed to convince the critics.

In 2012, she shot the television movie Los días de gloria which was also postponed due to political conflicts and broadcast in July 2013. Then, she joined the third season of La 1's series Gran Reserva in the role of Julia Cortazar. The same year, she was directed by Joaquín Oristrell in the Catalan TV movie Volare. Then she participated in the horror film Afterparty, which also failed to convince both the critics and the public. At the end of the year, she flew to Colombia to shoot Crimen con vista al Mar with Carmelo Gómez.

In 2013, she starred in the comedy ¿Quién mató a Bambi? alongside actors Clara Lago and Quim Gutiérrez. The film was well received by the critics and the public. The same year, she lent her voice to Sam in Cloudy with a Chance of Meatballs 2.

In 2014, she played Margarita de Austria in the successful historical series Isabel. The same year, she became the first actress in history to receive the Untameable Award at the Sitges Film Festival, rewarding her career. Men's Health's magazine named her Woman of the Year, an award that she received from the hand of her friend and legendary actress, Rossy de Palma.

In 2015, Corberó went to Trento to shoot La Dama Velata, a Spanish-Italian coproduction starring Miriam Leone, Andrea Bosca and Aura Garrido. Later this year, she played Natalia de Figueroa y Martorell in the Spanish sitcom Anclados alongside actress Rossy de Palma.

In March 2015, she starred as Nadia in Perdiendo el Norte alongside the actors Blanca Suarez and Yon Gonzalez. This same year, she received the Ciudad de Alicante Award, an award created by the Alicante Film Festival to encourage Spanish young talents. In December 2015, she landed a main-role in the new thriller series written by the creators of Gran Hotel, La Embajada. The series was presented at Cannes during the MIPTV and bought by the American network UniMás.

In 2015, she also landed her first main role in a movie in Cómo sobrevivir a una despedida and confirmed she's one of the best comical actresses of Spain. The film was presented at the Málaga Film Festival in the official competition and was nominated for Best Picture.

In 2016, she reprised her role of Margarita de Austria in the movie La corona partida. The film is a continuation of the series Isabel and Carlos, rey emperador. The same year, she repeated the dubbing experience by lending her voice to Katie in The Secret Life of Pets.

In 2017, Corberó landed a main role in the heist television series Money Heist. She played Tokyo, the narrator of the story, a runaway robber who is scouted by the Professor to participate in his plan. The series, created by Álex Pina, who previously wrote Vis a Vis, is characterized by its dark humor, its anticapitalist discourse and the importance of women. It first aired in Spain on Antena 3 and was later made available internationally through Netflix. For the first time in her career, Úrsula Corberó is acclaimed by the critics and the audience who see in this part a "before and after" in her career, in rupture with her previous roles. She was nominated for Best Actress in a TV Series at the Premios Feroz and won an Atv Award for Best Actress. The series won Best Drama Series at the 46th International Emmy Awards. It became a worldwide hit and is the most viewed non-English speaking series on the platform.

Later that year, she was given her first main dramatic role in cinema by Julio Medem. The Tree of Blood is a thriller and Corberó is Rebecca, a mysterious woman who, along with her husband, discover secrets from her family. The actress was also directed by Isabel Coixet for the movie Proyecto Tiempo: La Llave. The film debuted at the San Sebastian Film Festival.

In 2018, she is given her first English-speaking role in the American crime-drama series Snatch. She stars alongside actors Rupert Grint and Luke Pasqualino.

In 2019, she appeared as herself in the Spanish comedy series Paquita Salas.

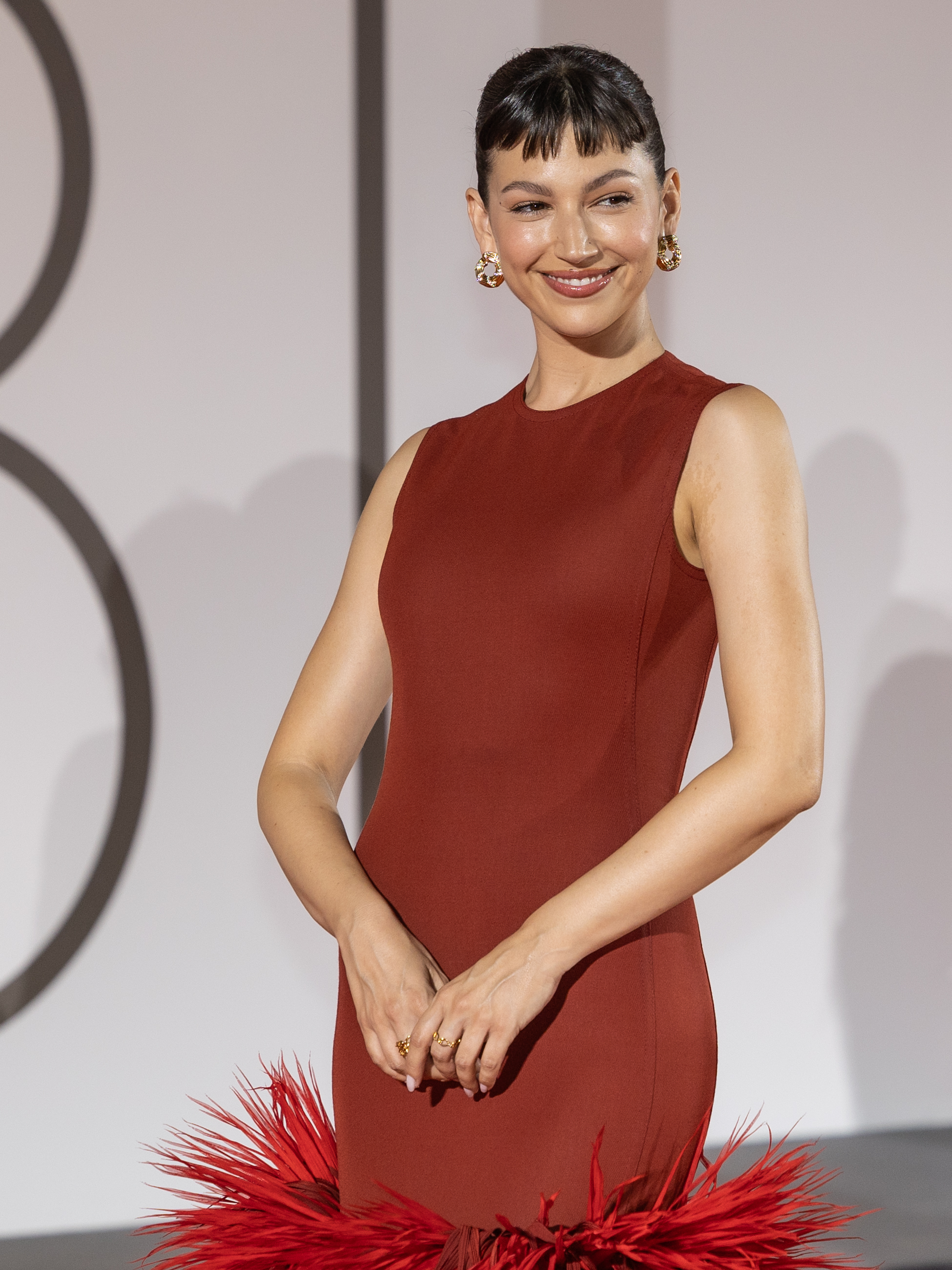
Corberó at the Venice Film Festival, 2024.

In 2020, she starred in the music video of Un Día (One Day), a song by J Balvin, Dua Lipa, Bad Bunny and Tainy.

In late 2019, Corberó was announced as playing G.I. Joe villain the Baroness in Snake Eyes, a spin-off from the G.I. Joe franchise. The film, directed by Robert Schwentke and starring actors Henry Golding, Andrew Koji and Samara Weaving, was released on 23 July 2021 in Dolby Cinema and IMAX. It was made available to stream on Paramount+ 45 days after its theatrical debut.

In April 2022, Corberó joined the cast of Netflix's action film entitled Lift, starring Gugu Mbatha-Raw, Kevin Hart, Vincent D'Onofrio and Paul Anderson, among others. The film, directed by F. Gary Gray and produced by Matt Reeves, premiered on 12 January 2023.

In September 2022, Corberó was announced as the lead of Netflix's new miniseries, based on a real story, entitled Burning Body (El cuerpo en llamas). She plays Rosa Peral, agent of the Guàrdia Urbana and wife of fellow agent Pedro Rodríguez, whose body was found carbonized in a car near Pantà de Foix in 2017. For her performance, Corberó received various accolades such as an Ondas Award for Best Actress in a TV Series.

In February 2024, the actress joined Eddie Redmayne and Lashana Lynch in Sky and Peacock's new series The Day of the Jackal. The entire cast was nominated at the 31st Screen Actors Guild Awards in the Outstanding Performance by an Ensemble in a Drama Series category but lost to the Shōgun cast.

In September 2024, Corberó starred in the comedy thriller Kill the Jockey, directed by Luis Ortega, portraying Abril, a jockey in a relationship with jockey Remo, while in a steamy affair with another racing mate played by Mariana di Girolamo. The film premiered at the 81st Venice International Film Festival in competition for the Golden Lion and the Queer Lion. Corberó's performance was praised by critics and earned her various accolades, including the Coral prize for Best Actress at the 45th edition of the Havana Film Festival and a nomination at the 72nd edition of the Silver Condor Awards.

In August 2025, Corberó joined the cast of Trudie Styler's upcoming romcom entitled Rose's Baby. The actress will star alongside Antonio Banderas, Eva Birthistle and Forest Whitaker among others.

Corberó is set to star in Jaume Balagueró's next horror feature There’s Someone in the Garden (Hay alguien en el jardín) which is slated to shoot in November 2026.

== Public image ==
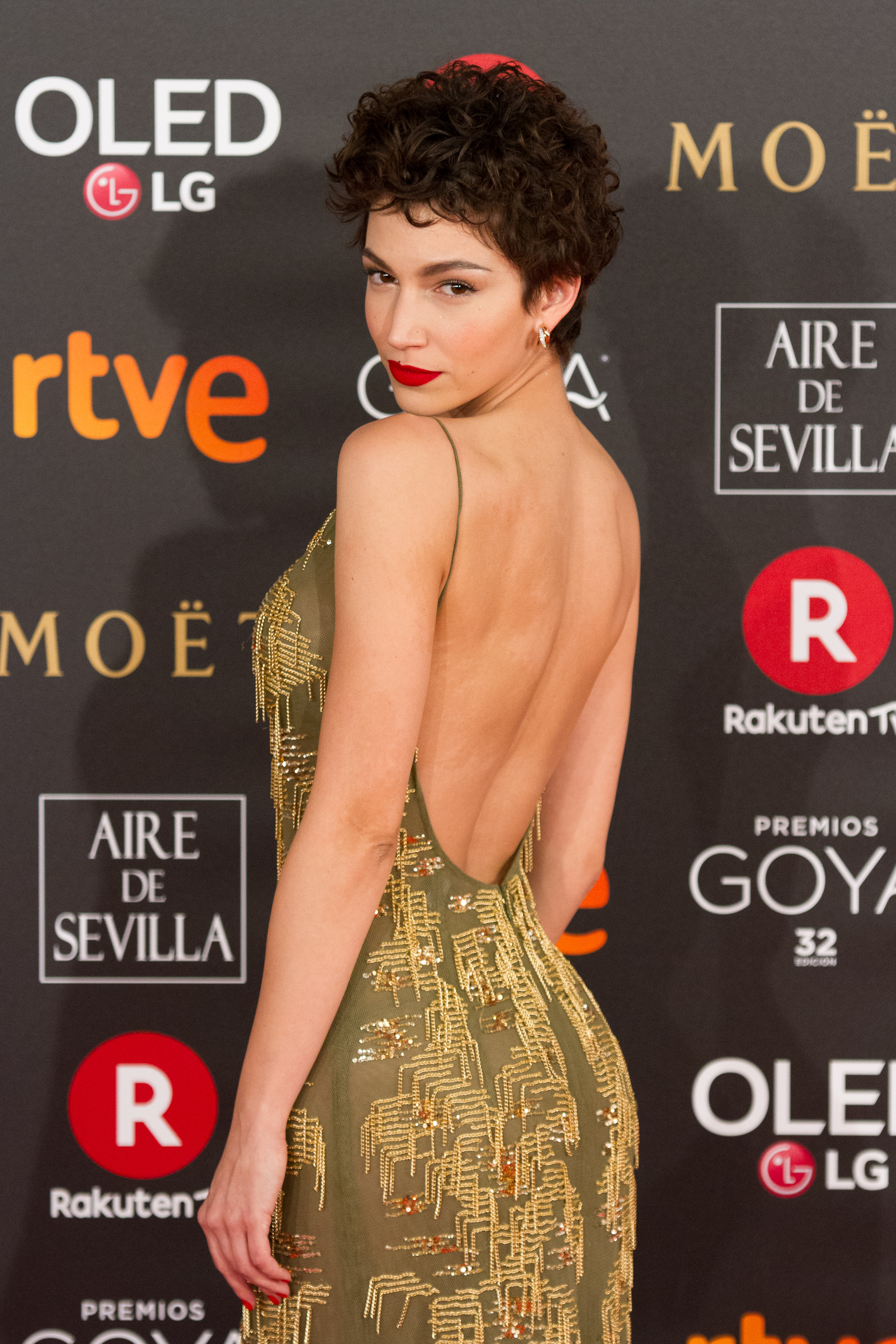
Corberó at the red carpet of the 32nd Goya Awards (February 2018).

Since October 2018, Corberó has been the ambassador of the Fiorever collection by Bulgari. She's been the face of several brands over the years such as Tampax (2011 and 2014), Stradivarius (2014), Maybelline (from 2015 to 2017), Calzedonia (2015) and Falabella (2019). She created the Harajuku collection for the eyewear brand Multiopticas in 2018.

In 2020, Corberó posed for the French fashion designer Simon Porte Jacquemus during the #JacquemusAtHome campaign. In 2021, she became the global ambassador of the Japanese cosmetics producer, Shiseido.

Corberó is considered a "fashion icon" and created buzz with her Teresa Helbig dress, which featured a lateral opening that showed her leg, at the 30th Goya Awards. She has denied rumors of anorexia, attributing her physique to a healthy diet and various forms of exercise, including pilates.

Corberó is Catalan but does not have an opinion on the Catalan independence movement. Following the outcome of the 2017 Catalan independence referendum, she tweeted that she was "heartbroken" by the ensuing police violence.

In May 2018, Corberó became the most followed Spanish celebrity on Instagram with more than 5 million followers.

== Charity work ==
Corberó is a feminist. In 2018, she participated in a video in favor of the legalization of abortion in Argentina.

Corberó is the co-founder of Ymas, a company of artists that allows people to attend film premieres, behind the scenes, and more.

Corberó has participated in several breast cancer awareness campaigns with actresses Blanca Suarez and Clara Lago. She is also committed to childhood cancer with the Atresmedia Foundation.

Corberó also uses her platform to raise awareness about climate change and was a jury member of the 4th edition of the We Art Water Film Festival. In 2020, she participated to #REInventaElSistema, a campaign launched by Greenpeace to raise awareness about climate change following the COVID-19 pandemic, alongside personalities like anthropologist Jane Goodall, singer Alejandro Sanz, and actress Elena Anaya.

In July 2023, she became the first global ambassador of the international NGO Save The Children which goal is to improve the lives of children worldwide.

== Personal life ==
Corberó dated actor Israel Rodríguez from 2009 to 2011, tennis player Feliciano López for five months in 2011, and model Andrés Velencoso from 2013 to 2016.

Since 2016, Corberó has been in a long-term relationship with Argentine actor Chino Darín, whom she met on the set of the television series The Embassy. In September 2025, Corberó announced her pregnancy on Instagram with the caption: "This isn't AI." The actress gave birth to their first child, a son named Dante on 9 February 2026 in Barcelona.

== Filmography ==
=== Film ===
Year	Movie	Character	Director	Notes
2011	Elsinor Park	Lissa	Jordi Roigé	
2011	Paranormal Xperience 3D	Belén	Sergi Vizcaíno	
2013	Afterparty	María/Laura	Miguel Larraya	
2013	Crimen con vista al mar	Sonia Torres	Gerardo Herrero	
2013	Who Killed Bambi?	Paula Larrea	Santi Amodeo	
2013	Cloudy with a Chance of Meatballs 2	Sam	Cody Cameron, Kris Pearn	Voice
2015	Off Course	Nadia	Nacho G. Velilla	
2015	Cómo sobrevivir a una despedida	Marta	Manuela Burló Moreno	
2016	La corona partida	Margaret of Austria, Duchess of Savoy	Jordi Frades	
2016	The Secret Life of Pets	Katie	Chris Renaud	Voice
2017	The Emoji Movie	Sonrisas	Tony Leondis	Voice
2017	Proyecto Tiempo. Parte I: La Llave	Alma	Isabel Coixet	
2018	The Tree of Blood	Rebeca	Julio Medem	
2021	Snake Eyes	Baroness	Robert Schwentke	
2024	Lift	Camila	F. Gary Gray	
2024	Kill the Jockey	Abril	Luis Ortega	
2026	Up Against It		Trudie Styler	
TBA	There's someone in the Garden		Jaume Balagueró	

=== Television ===
Year	Title	Character	Channel	Notes
2002	Mirall trencat	Maria	TV3	3 episodes
2005–2006	Ventdelplà	Sara	TV3	7 episodes
2007	Cuenta atrás	Daniela	Cuatro	1 episode
2007	El Internado	Manuela Portillo	Antena 3	1 episode
2008–2011	Física o Química	Ruth Gómez Quintana	Antena 3	71 episodes
2011–2019	14 de abril. La República	Beatriz de la Torre	La 1	30 episodes
2012	Volare	Lila/Malva	TV3	TV movie
2013	Mario Conde, los días de gloria	Paloma Aliende	Telecinco	2 episodes
2013	Gran Reserva	Julia Cortázar / Laura Márquez	La 1	8 episodes
2014	Isabel	Margaret of Austria, Duchess of Savoy	La 1	7 episodes
2014	Con el culo al aire	Sofía	Antena 3	1 episode
2015	Anclados	Natalia Guillén	Telecinco	8 episodes
2015	La dama velada	Anita	Rai 1	5 episodes
2016	La embajada	Ester Salinas Cernuda	Antena 3	11 episodes
2017	¿Qué fue de Jorge Sanz?	Úrsula Corberó	Movistar+	1 episode
2017–2021	Money Heist	Silene Oliveira / Tokyo	Antena 3/Netflix	41 episodes
2018	Snatch	Inés Santiago	Crackle	8 episodes
2019	Paquita Salas	Úrsula Corberó	Netflix	1 episode
2023	Star Wars: Visions	Lola (voice)	Disney+	1 episode
2023	Burning Body	Rosa Peral	Netflix	8 episodes
2024	Mr. & Mrs. Smith	Runi	Amazon Prime Video	1 episode
2024	The Day of the Jackal	Nuria	Sky/Peacock	10 episodes

=== Music video ===
Year	Artist	Song
2000	Top Junior	Ven, ven, vamonos de fiesta
2008	Cinco de Enero	El precio de la verdad
2008	Despistaos	Física o Química
2010	Angy Fernández feat. the cast of Física o Química	Cuando Lloras
2013	Auryn	Heartbreaker
2013	Pignoise	Lo importante
2015	Kiko Veneno feat. Rozalén	Mi Querida España
2018	C. Tangana	Cuando Me Miras
2020	J Balvin, Dua Lipa, Bad Bunny, Tainy	Un Día (One Day)

== Theater ==
Year	Title	Character	Director	Theater
2012	Perversiones sexuales en Chicago	Deborah	Juan Pedro Campoy	

== Awards and nominations ==
Year	Award	Category	Work	Result	Ref.
2010	Glamour Awards	Revelation of the Year	Física o Química	Won	
2011	Kapital Awards	Best Actress	Física o Química	Won	
2014	47th Sitges Film Festival	'Espíritu Indomable' Award	—N/a	Won	
2014	Men's Health	Woman of the Year	—N/a	Won	
2015	Neox Fan Awards	Best Main Actress	Girl's Night Out	Nominated	
2015	Alicante Film Festival	'Ciudad de Alicante' Award	—N/a	Won	
2017	MiM Series Festival	Best Dramatic Actress	Money Heist	Nominated	
2018	5th Feroz Awards	Best Main Actress in a Series	Money Heist	Nominated	
2018	20th Iris Awards	Best Actress	Money Heist	Won	
2020	7th Platino Awards	Best Actress in a Miniseries or TV Series	Money Heist	Nominated	
2022	Premios Juventud (Youth Awards)	'Me Enamoran' (Best Couple, shared with Miguel Herrán)	Money Heist	Nominated	
2023	70th Ondas Awards	Best Actress in a TV Series	Burning Body	Won	
2023	29th Forqué Awards	Best Actress in a TV Series	Burning Body	Nominated	
2024	11th Feroz Awards	Best Main Actress in a Series	Burning Body	Nominated	
2024	32nd Actors and Actresses Union Awards	Best Television Actress in a Leading Role	Burning Body	Nominated	
2024	74th Fotogramas de Plata Awards	Best Television Actress	Burning Body	Won	
2024	11th Platino Awards	Best Actress in a Miniseries or TV Series	Burning Body	Nominated	
2024	11th Platino Awards	Audience Award for Best Female Performance in Miniseries or Teleseries	Burning Body	Won	
2024	Havana Film Festival	Best Actress	Kill the Jockey	Won	
2025	Silver Condor Awards	Best Actress	Kill the Jockey	Nominated	
2025	12th Platino Awards	Best Actress	Kill the Jockey	Nominated	
2025	Screen Actors Guild Awards	Outstanding Performance by an Ensemble in a Drama Series	The Day of the Jackal	Nominated	
