= List of Money Heist cast members =

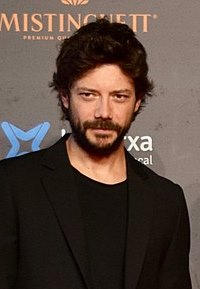
Álvaro Morte

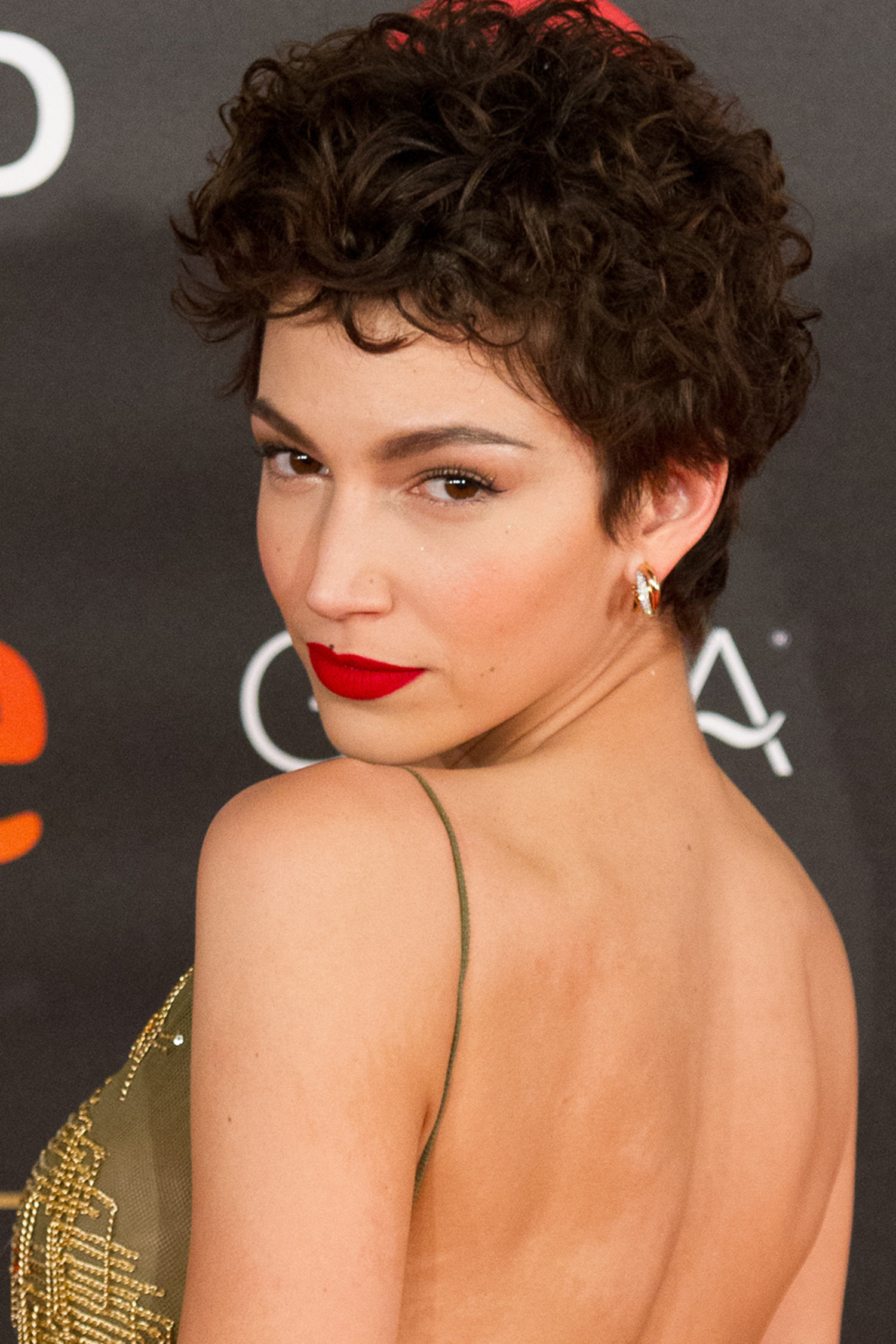
Úrsula Corberó

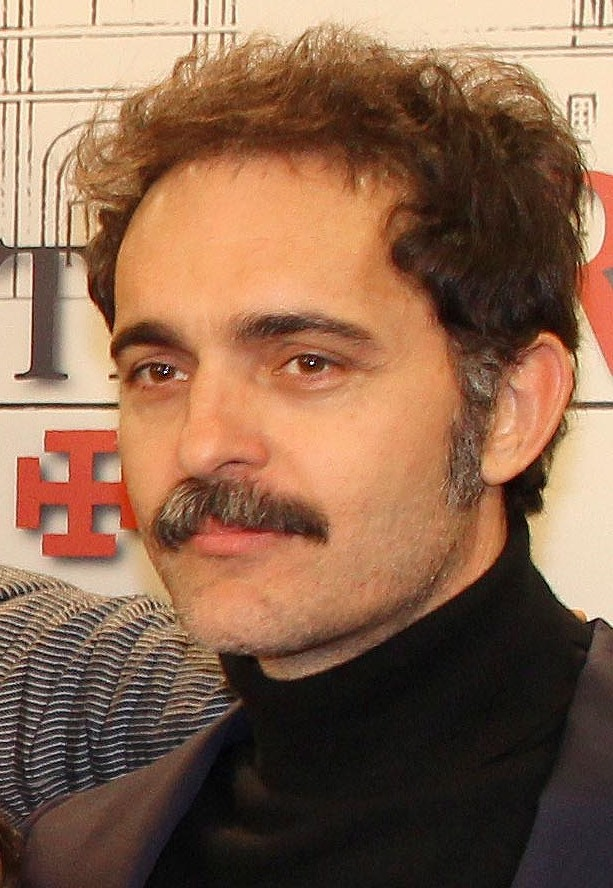
Pedro Alonso

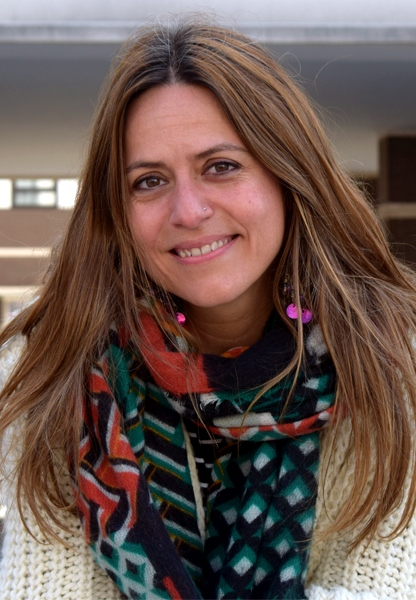
Itziar Ituño

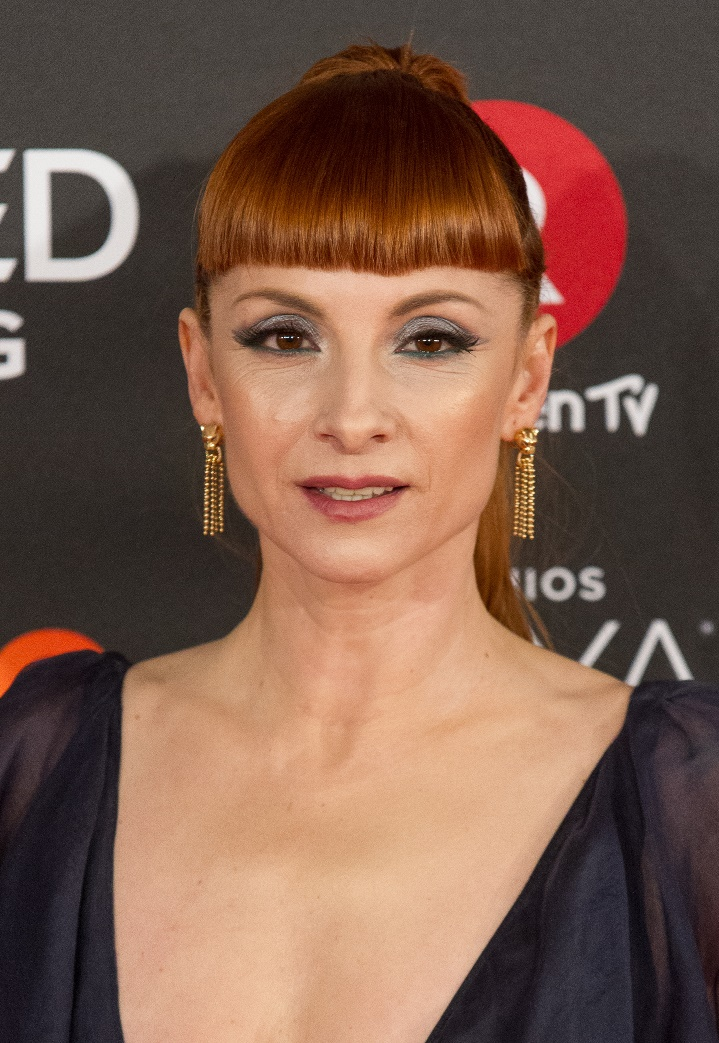
Najwa Nimri

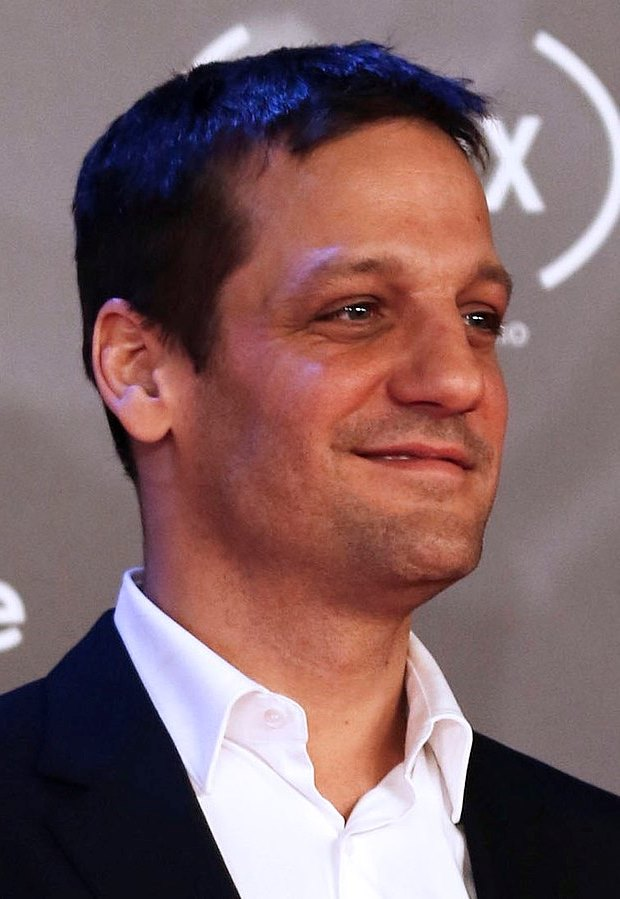
R. de la Serna

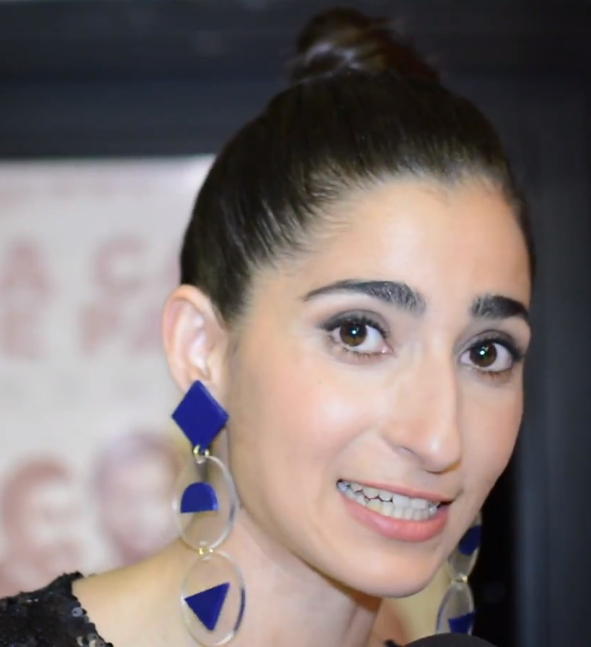
Alba Flores

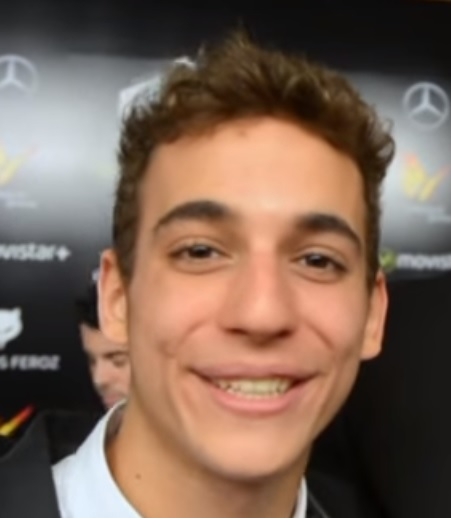
Miguel Herrán

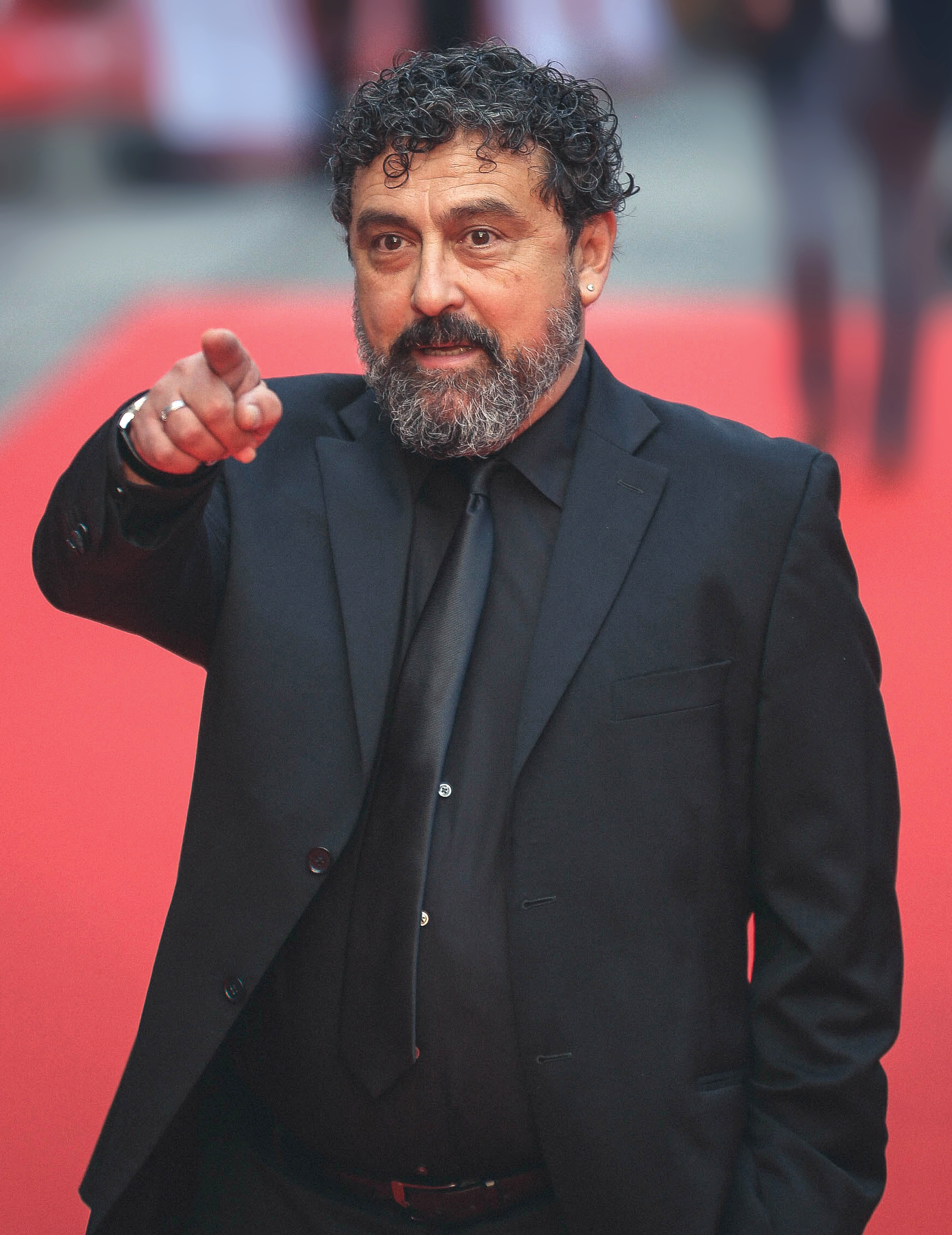
Paco Tous

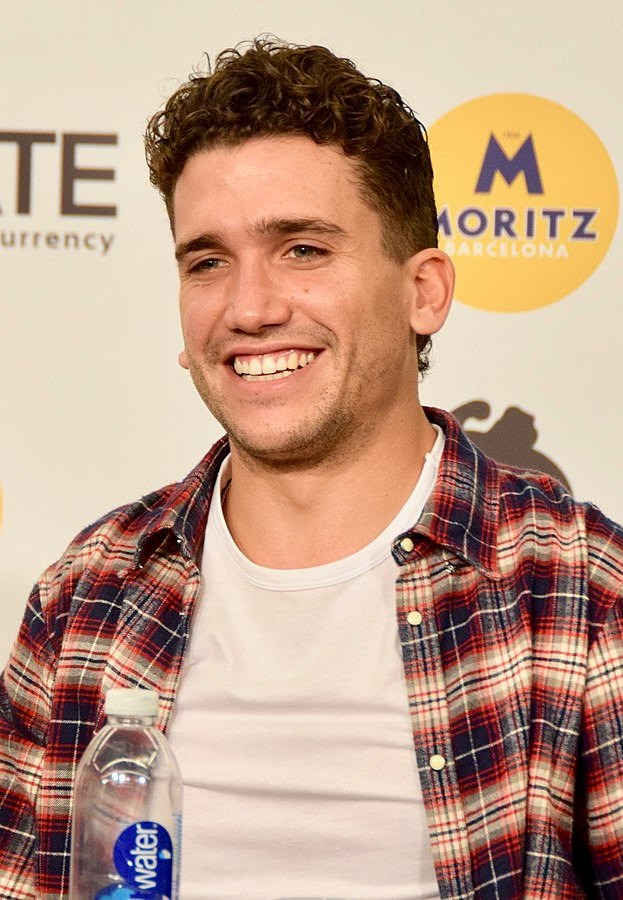
Jaime Lorente

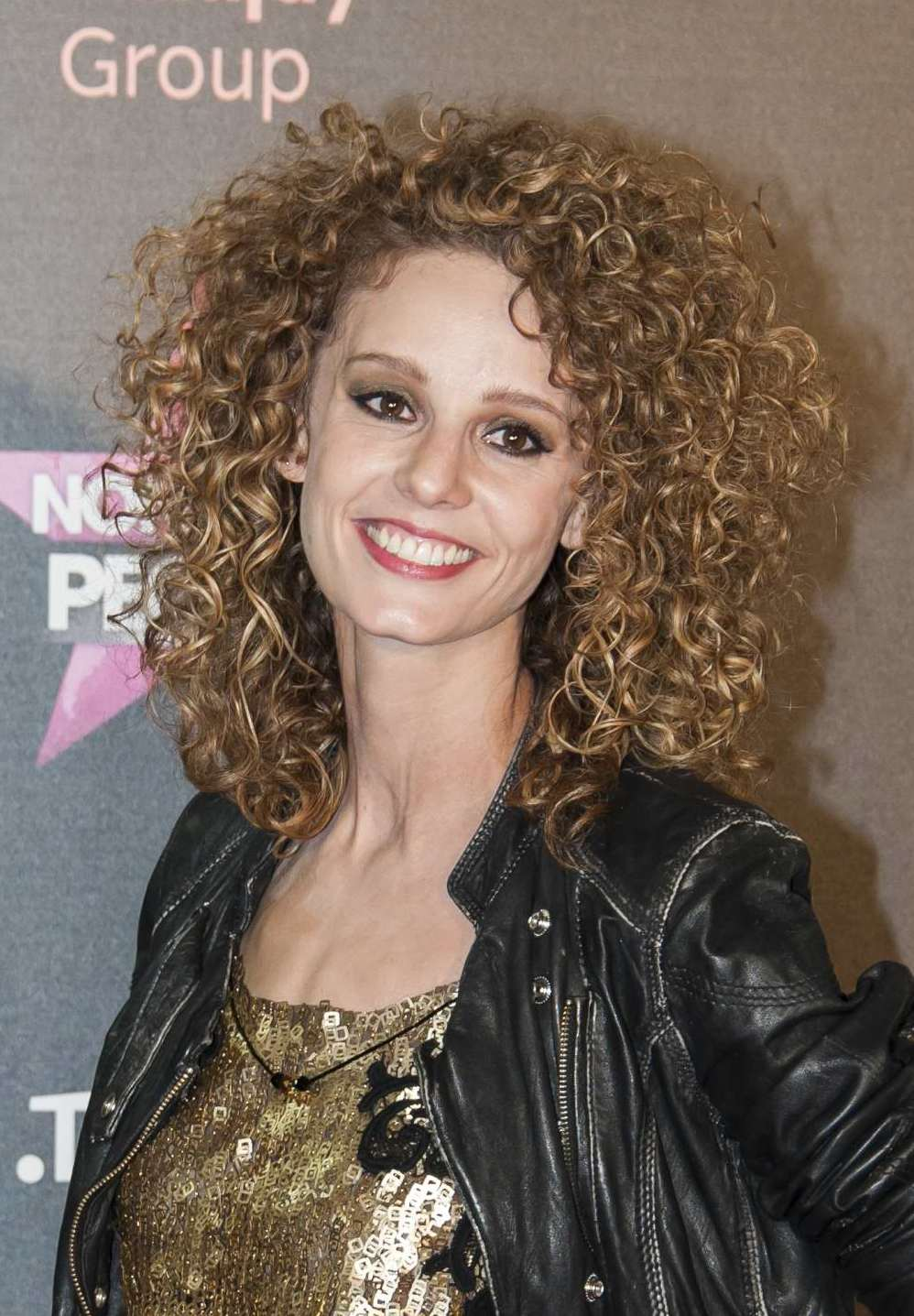
Esther Acebo

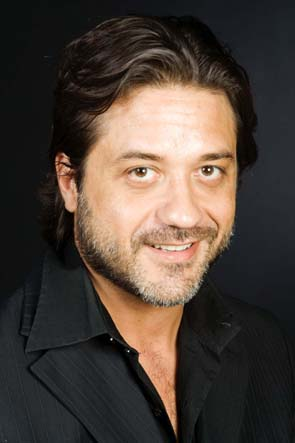
Enrique Arce

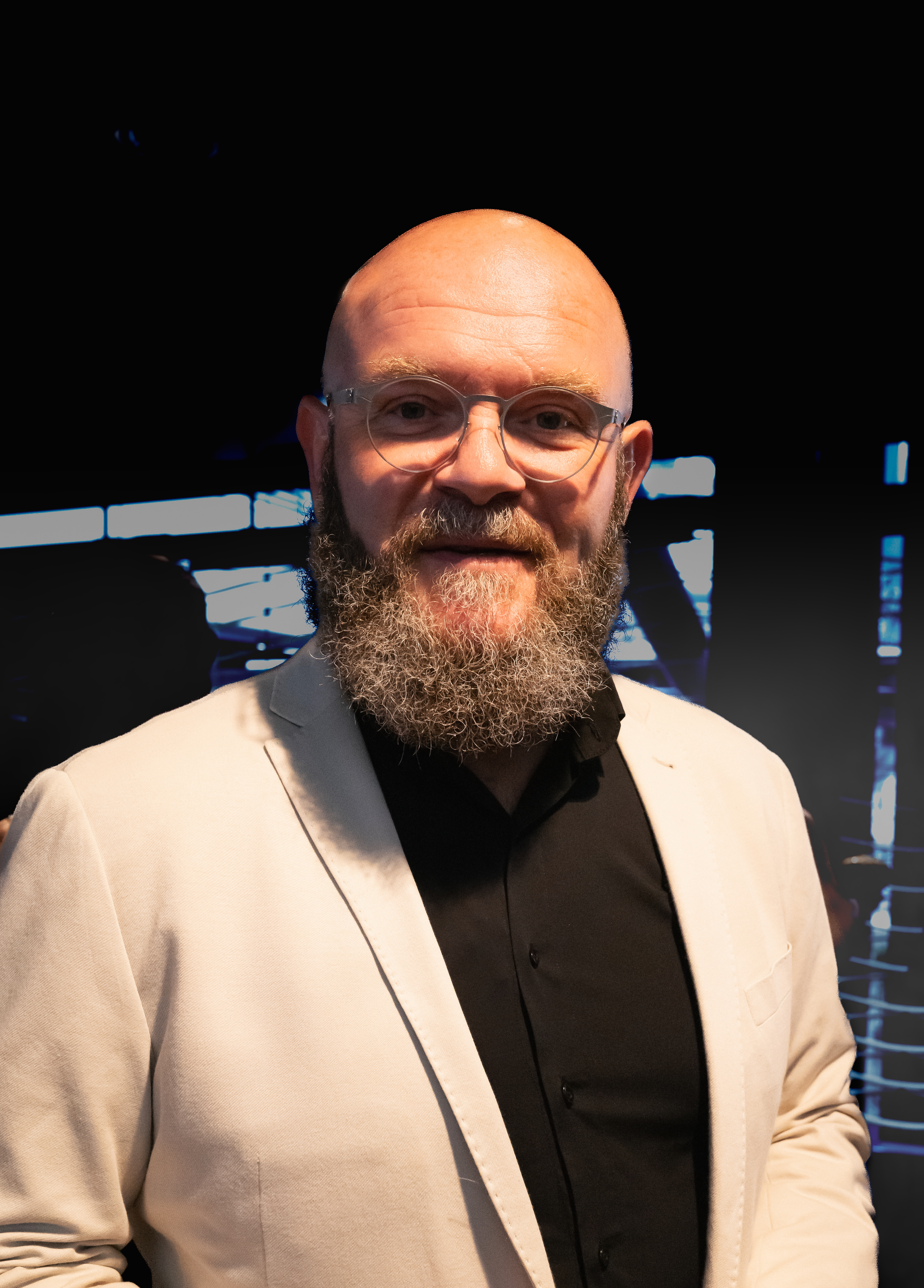
Darko Perić

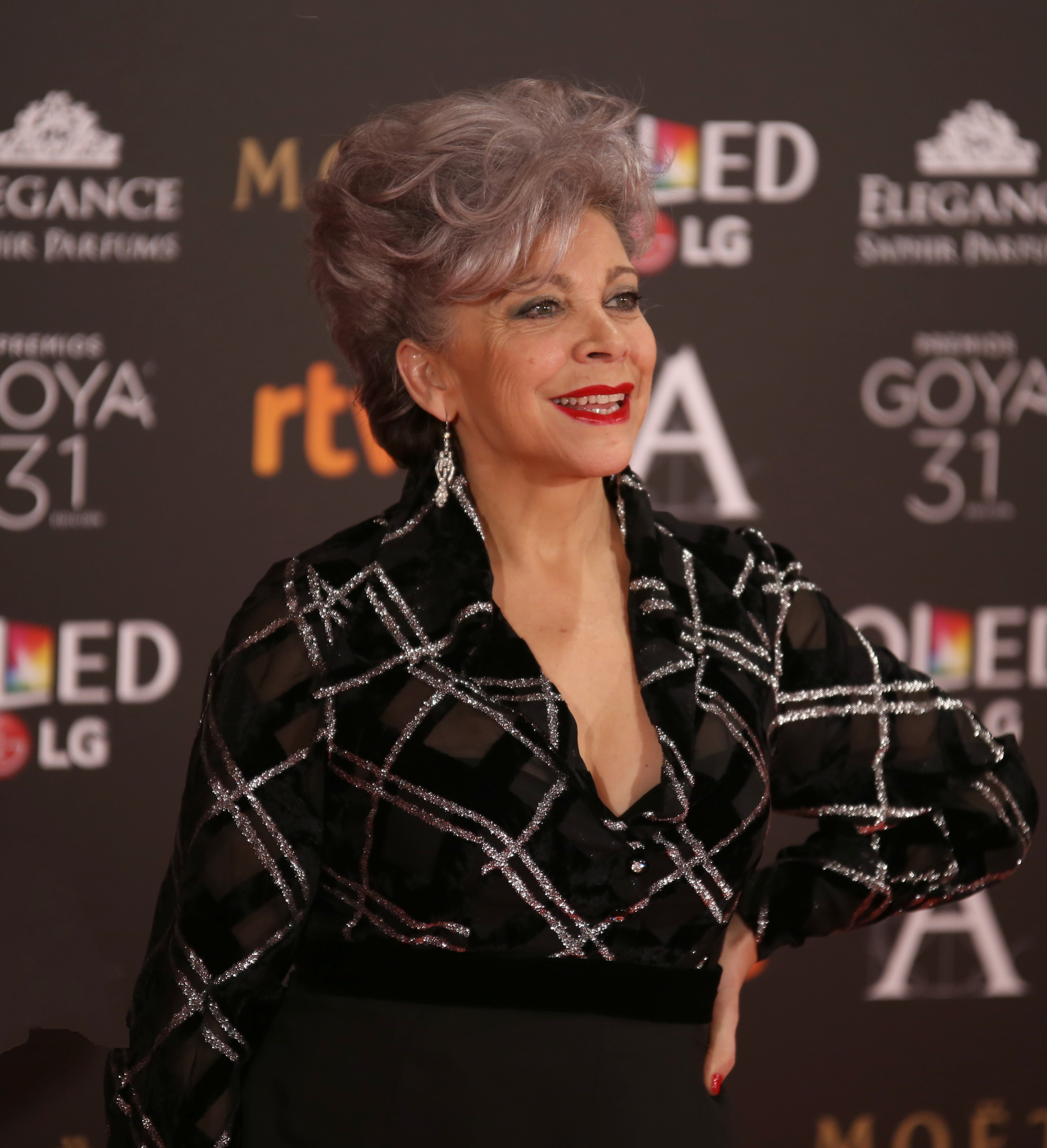
Kiti Mánver

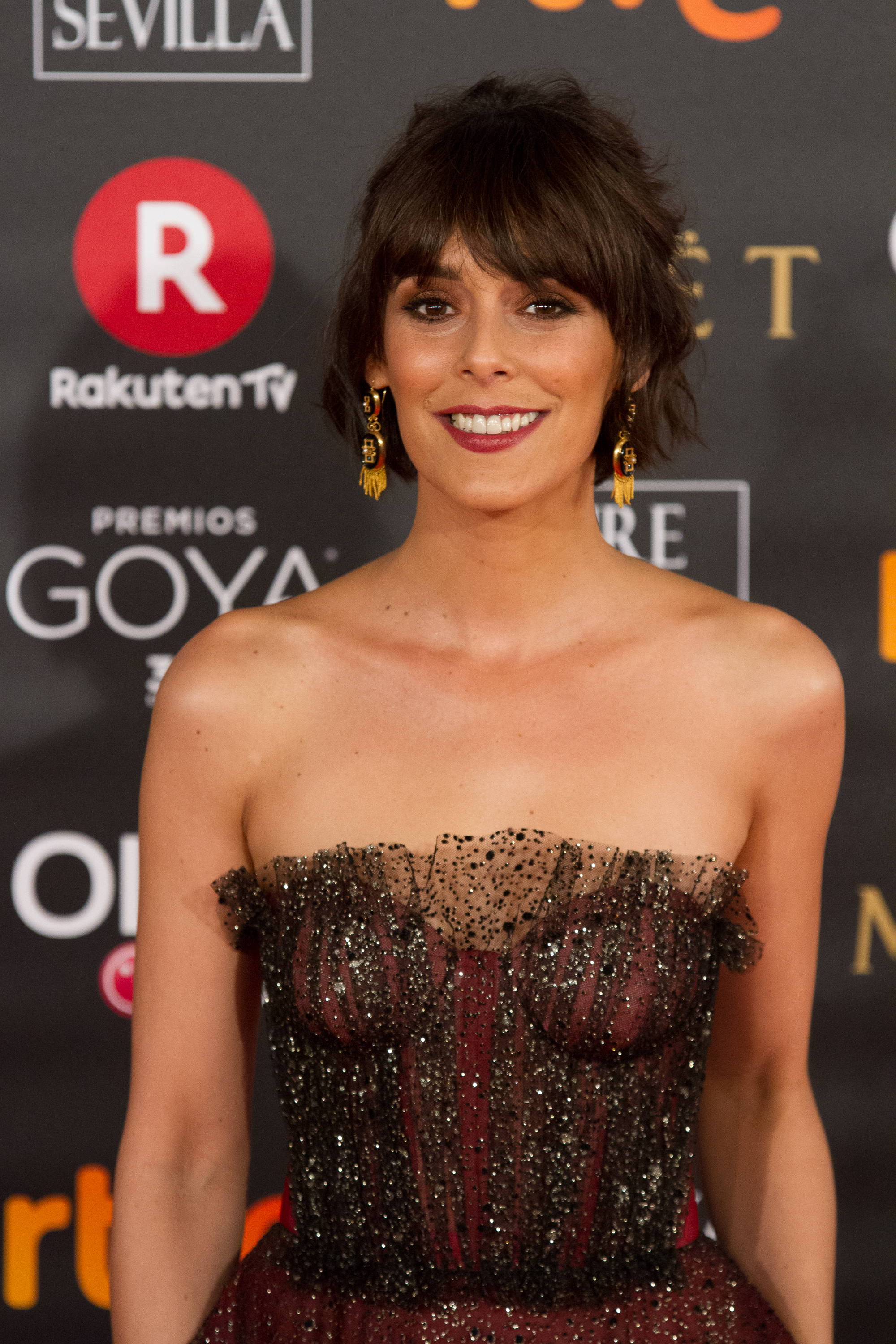
Belén Cuesta

The following is a list of actors, and the characters they played, in the Netflix series Money Heist.

== Overview ==
=== Main ===
Character	Portrayed by	Seasons					
Character	Portrayed by	Season 1		Season 2		Season 3	
Character	Portrayed by	Part 1	Part 2	Part 3	Part 4	Part 5 Vol. 1	Part 5 Vol. 2
Silene Oliveira (Tokyo)	Úrsula Corberó	Main	Main	Main	Main	Main	Main
Sergio Marquina (The Professor) / Salvador "Salva" Martín	Álvaro Morte	Main	Main	Main	Main	Main	Main
Raquel Murillo (Lisbon)	Itziar Ituño	Main	Main	Main	Main	Main	Main
Andrés de Fonollosa (Berlin)	Pedro Alonso	Main	Main	Main	Main	Main	Main
Agustín Ramos (Moscow)	Paco Tous	Main	Main	Guest	Guest	Guest	Main (Note: The actor was credited with the rest of the main cast in the final closing credits "A Family Reunion" (5x10), but did not appear in the episode.)
Ágata Jiménez (Nairobi)	Alba Flores	Main (Note: In part 5, Alba Flores is credited as a series regular in the episodes that feature her.)	Main	Main	Main	Main	Main
Aníbal Cortés (Rio)	Miguel Herrán	Main	Main	Main	Main	Main	Main
Daniel Ramos (Denver) (Note: The official website lists Denver's name as Daniel, but in the show he has called himself Ricardo, Dani and Daniel.)	Jaime Lorente	Main	Main	Main	Main	Main	Main
Mónica Gaztambide (Stockholm)	Esther Acebo	Main	Main	Main	Main	Main	Main
Arturo Román	Enrique Arce	Main	Main	Main	Main	Main	Main
Alison Parker	María Pedraza	Main	Main				
Mirko Dragić (Helsinki)	Darko Perić	Main	Main	Main	Main	Main	Main
Mariví Fuentes	Kiti Mánver	Main	Main	Guest	Guest		
Santiago Lopez (Bogotá)	Hovik Keuchkerian			Main	Main	Main	Main
Martín Berrote (Palermo / The Engineer)	Rodrigo de la Serna			Main	Main	Main	Main
Alicia Sierra	Najwa Nimri			Main	Main	Main	Main
Jakov (Marseille)	Luka Peroš			Recurring	Main	Main	Main
Juan later Julia Martinez (Manila)	Belén Cuesta			Recurring	Main	Main	Main
Colonel Luis Tamayo	Fernando Cayo			Recurring	Main	Main	Main
Benjamín Martinez (Logroño)	Ramón Agirre				Recurring	Recurring	Main (Note: The actor was credited with the rest of the main cast in the final closing credits in "A Family Reunion" (5x10).)
Matías Caño (Pamplona)	Ahikar Azcona			Recurring	Recurring	Recurring	Main
Dimitri Mostovói / Radko Dragić (Oslo) (Note: The final closing credits reveal Oslo's mug shot with the name Dimitri Mostovói, while his coffin shows the name Radko Dragic.)	Roberto García Ruiz	Recurring	Recurring	Recurring	Recurring		Main
César Gandía	José Manuel Poga			Recurring	Recurring	Recurring	Main
Ángel Rubio	Fernando Soto	Recurring	Recurring	Recurring	Recurring	Recurring	Main
Suárez	Mario de la Rosa	Recurring	Recurring	Recurring	Recurring	Recurring	Main
Colonel Alfonso Prieto	Juan Fernández	Recurring	Recurring	Recurring	Recurring		Guest

=== Recurring ===
Character	Portrayed by	Seasons					
Character	Portrayed by	Season 1		Season 2		Season 3	
Character	Portrayed by	Part 1	Part 2	Part 3	Part 4	Part 5 Vol. 1	Part 5 Vol. 2
Mercedes Colmenar	Anna Gras	Recurring	Recurring				
Pablo Ruiz	Fran Morcillo	Recurring					
Ariadna Cascales	Clara Alvarado	Recurring	Recurring				
Francisco Torres	Antonio Cuellar Rodriguez	Recurring	Recurring				
Alberto Vicuña	Miquel García Borda	Recurring	Recurring		Recurring		Guest
Paula Vicuña Murillo	Naia Guz	Recurring	Recurring	Recurring	Recurring		
Benito Antoñanzas	Antonio Romero			Recurring	Recurring	Recurring	Recurring
Tatiana Marse	Diana Gómez			Recurring	Recurring	Recurring	Recurring
Mario Urbaneja	Pep Munné			Recurring	Recurring	Recurring	Recurring
Amanda	Olalla Hernández			Recurring	Recurring	Recurring	Recurring
Paquita	Mari Carmen Sánchez			Recurring	Recurring	Guest	Guest
Miguel Fernández	Carlos Suárez			Recurring	Recurring	Recurring	Recurring
Antonio García Ferreras	Antonio García Ferreras				Recurring	Recurring	
Sagasta	José Manuel Seda					Recurring	Recurring
Rafael de Fonollosa	Patrick Criado					Recurring	Recurring
René	Miguel Ángel Silvestre					Recurring	
Ramiro	Alberto Amarilla					Recurring	Recurring
Arantxa Arteche	Jennifer Miranda					Recurring	Recurring
