= Brays Efe =

Spanish actor

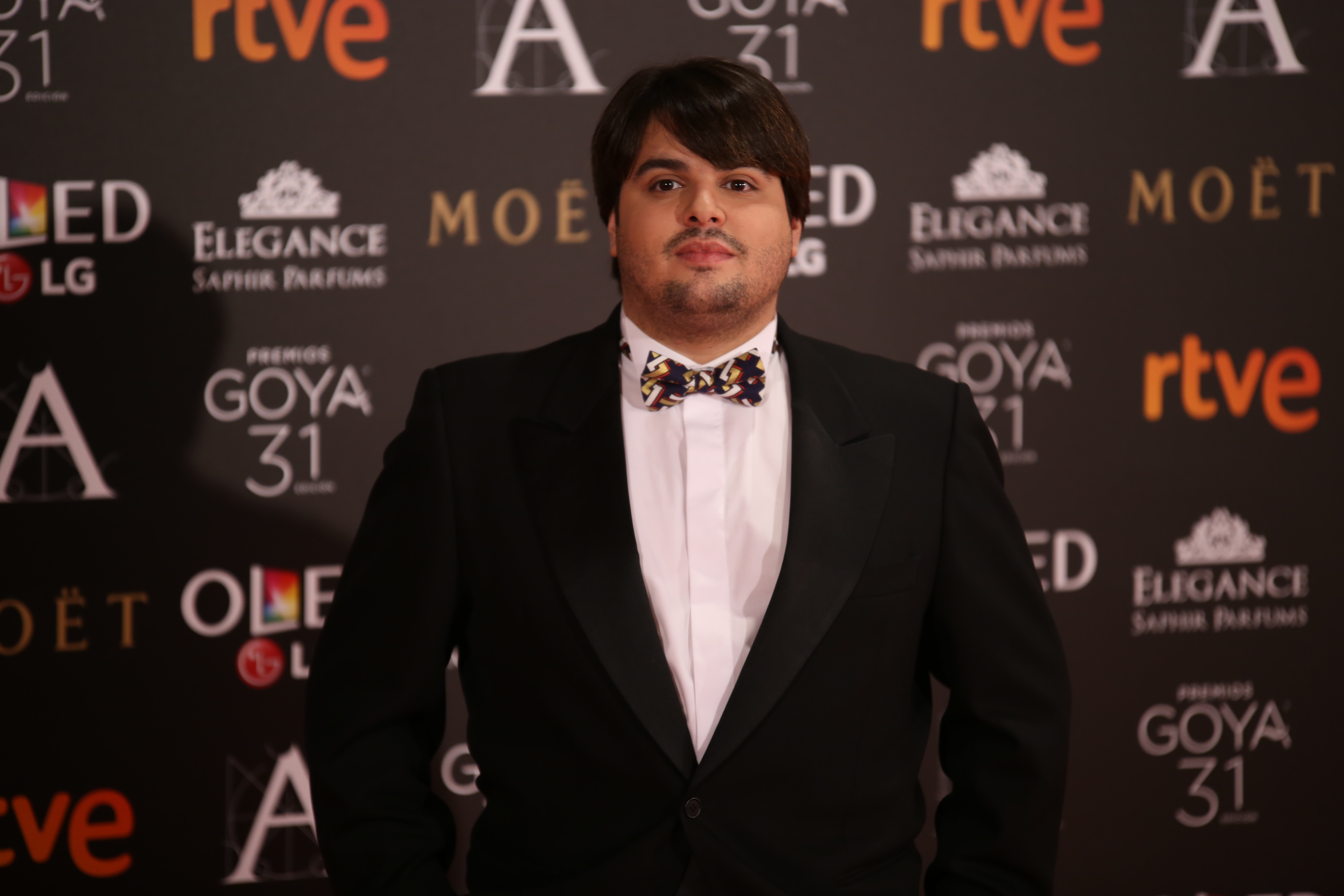
- Efe at the 2017 Goya Awards
- Born: Brays Fernández Vidal; 30 September 1988 (age 37); Las Palmas de Gran Canaria, Spain
- Occupations: Actor, television personality
- Years active: 2013–present

Brays Fernández Vidal (born 30 September 1988), best known by the stage name Brays Efe, is a Spanish actor and television personality. He became popular for his role in the comedy web series Paquita Salas.

== Biography ==
Brays Fernández Vidal was born in Las Palmas de Gran Canaria on 30 September 1988. He grew up however in a farm in Nigrán, province of Pontevedra, Galicia. He moved to Madrid to study Audiovisual Communication, but he dropped out. He has worked as a journalist, casting assistant and radio announcer. He performed the role of El mayordomo in the four initial episodes of the talk show El Tea Party de Alaska y Mario. He took part in the 7th season of the celebrity reality contest of Tu cara me suena, impersonating María del Monte, Netta, Sara Montiel, Eminem, Julio Iglesias, Chayanne and Miki Núñez. In 2021, Amazon Prime Video selected him to co-host Celebrity Bake Off together with Paula Vázquez.

== Filmography ==
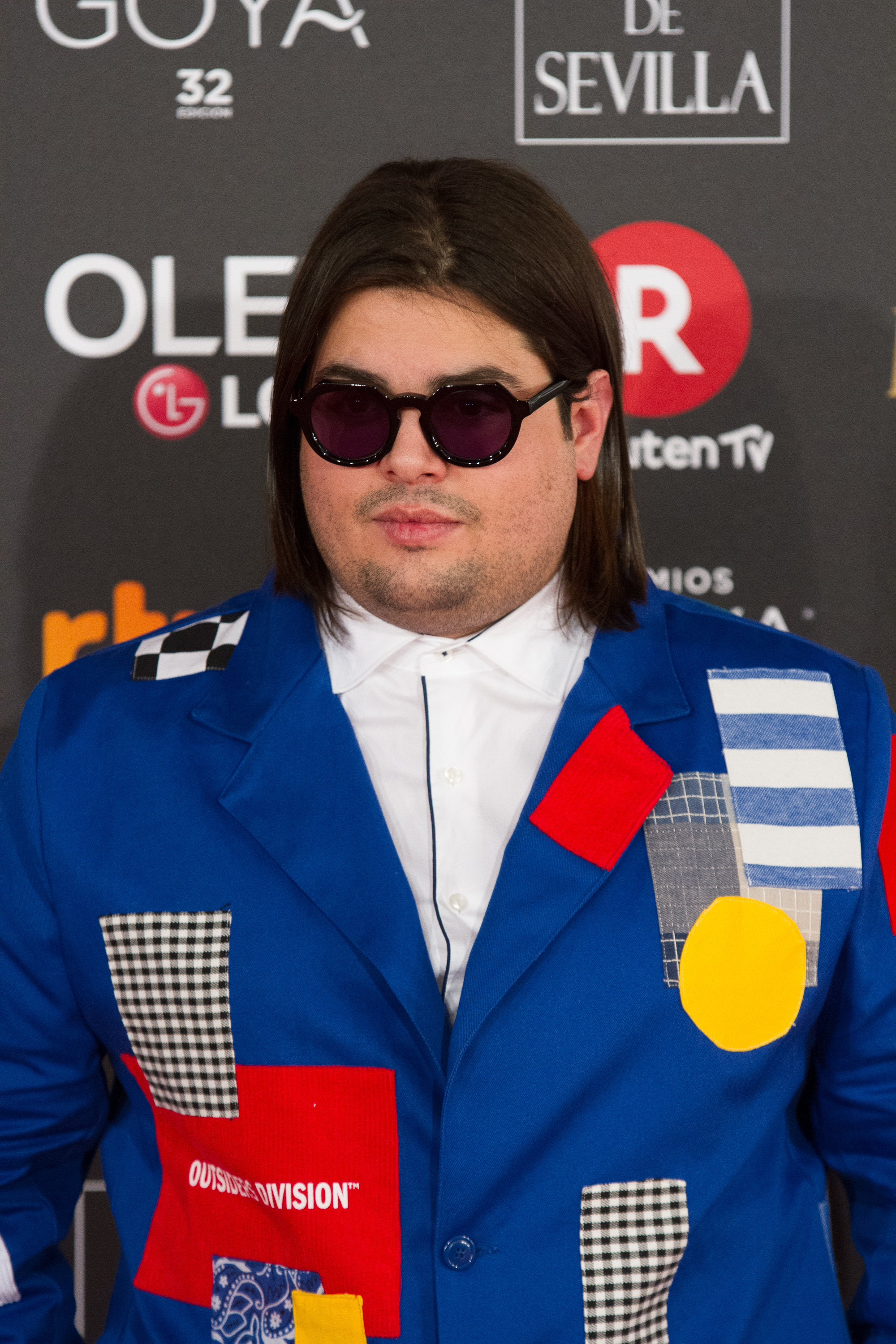
Efe at the 2018 Goya Awards

=== Film ===
| Year | Title | Role | Notes | Ref. |
|---|---|---|---|---|
| 2015 | Cómo sobrevivir a una despedida (Girl's Night Out) | Mateo | | |
| 2018 | Paella Today! | El Influencer | | |
| 2019 | El año de la plaga | Miguel | Starring role | |
| 2019 | ¿Qué te juegas? (Get Her... If You Can) | Alex | | |
| 2020 | Orígenes secretos (Unknown Origins) | Jorge Elías | Starring role | |
| 2023 | El fantástico caso del Golem (The Fantastic Golem Affairs) | Juan | | |

=== Television ===
Fiction

| Year | Title | Role | Notes | Ref. |
|---|---|---|---|---|
| 2016– | Paquita Salas | Paquita Salas | Lead character | |
| 2017 | Ella es tu padre | Presenter | Guest role. Episode 8 | |
| 2018 | Looser | Juan Paul | Recurring role | |
| 2018 | Terror y feria | | Cameo. Episode "Marifé" | |
| 2020 | Veneno | Florentino Fernández / Krispín Klander | Cameo | |
| 2020 | Por H o por B | Oli | Main | |

Nonfiction

| Year | Title | Role | Notes | Ref. |
|---|---|---|---|---|
| 2014 | Gran Hermano 15: El debate | Panelist | 1 episode | |
| 2017 | Yasss | Host | | |
| 2018–2019 | Tu cara me suena | Contestant | Season 7 | |
| 2018–2019 | Lo siguiente | Panelist | | |
| 2018–2019 | Campanadas fin de año Canarias | Host | TV special | |
| 2021 | Drag Race España | Special guest | Episode 6 | |
| 2021–present | Celebrity Bake Off España | Host | | |

== Awards and nominations ==
| Year | Award | Category | Work | Result | Ref. |
|---|---|---|---|---|---|
| 2017 | 26th Actors and Actresses Union Awards | Best New Actor | Paquita Salas | Nominated | |
| 2017 | 4th Feroz Awards | Best Main Actor in a TV Series | Paquita Salas | Won | |
| 2018 | 6th MiM Series Awards | Best Comedy Actor | Paquita Salas | Won | |
| 2019 | 6th Feroz Awards | Best Main Actor in a TV Series | Paquita Salas | Nominated | |
| 2019 | 21st Iris Awards | Best Actor | Paquita Salas | Nominated | |
| 2020 | 7th Feroz Awards | Best Main Actor in a TV Series | Paquita Salas | Nominated | |
