= List of awards and nominations received by Money Heist =

Money Heist awards and nominations
Awards and nominations
Award	Won	Nom
Unión de Actores	3	10
Premios IRIS	7	8
Premios Feroz	0	8
Zapping Awards	0	5
Fotogramas de Plata	1	4
Platino Awards	3	1
International GP of Dubbing	3	3
PRODU Awards	3	3
Camille Awards	0	3
Festival de Luchon	2	2
NF of Voices Dubbing Shadow	2	2
FesTVal	0	2
International Emmy Awards	1	1
MiM Series	1	1
Golden Nymph	1	1
Jerry Goldsmith Awards	1	1
Monte-Carlo TV Festival	1	1
Premios Fénix	0	1
Globes de Cristal Awards	0	1
- Summary
Total	29	62

Money Heist (Spanish: La casa de papel, The House of Paper) is a Spanish heist crime drama television series created by Álex Pina. Netflix acquired global streaming rights in late 2017.

In the first four programming seasons, the Spanish TV series garnered a total of 30 nominations by winning 26 times.

In 2017 the series received two Award nominations (one victory) at the Fotogramas de Plata, other two (no victories) at the FesTVal and got an Award win at the Premios Iris. In total, therefore, five nominations and two wins.

In 2018 five nominations (no victories) at the Premios Feroz, five nominations (one victory) at the Spanish Actors Union, two nominations (one victory) at the Premios Iris, and the series got a victory in three others, at 46th International Emmy Awards, at the Golden Nymph and at the MiM Series, three nominations (no victories) at the Camille Awards, two awards at the Festival de Luchon and one nomination (no victory) at the Premios Fénix. In total, therefore, twenty-one nominations and seven wins.

In 2019 five nominations (five victories) at the Premios Iris, three nominations (one victory) at the Spanish Actors Union. In total, therefore, seven nominations and six wins.

In 2020 three nominations (no victories) at the Premios Feroz, two nominations (one victory) at the Spanish Actors Union and two nominations (no victories) at the Fotogramas de Plata, four nominations (three victories) at Platino Awards. In total, therefore, eight nominations and four wins.

== By years ==
=== 2017 ===
2017 award nominations
Award	Category	Nominee(s)	Result
Premios Iris	Best screenplay	Álex Pina, Esther Martínez Lobato, David Barrocal, Pablo Roa, Esther Morales, Fernando Sancristóbal, Javier Gómez Santander	Won
FesTVal	Best direction in fiction	Jesús Colmenar, Alejandro Bazzano, Miguel Ángel Vivas, Álex Rodrigo	Nominated
FesTVal	Best fiction (by critics)	Money Heist	Nominated
Fotogramas de Plata	Audience Award – Best Spanish Series	Money Heist	Won
Fotogramas de Plata	Best TV Actor	Pedro Alonso	Nominated

=== 2018 ===
2018 award nominations
Award	Category	Nominee(s)	Result
Spanish Actors Union	Lead Performance, Male	Álvaro Morte	Nominated
Spanish Actors Union	Performance in a Minor Role, Male	Jaime Lorente	Nominated
Spanish Actors Union	Supporting Performance, Female	Alba Flores	Nominated
Spanish Actors Union	Supporting Performance, Male	Pedro Alonso	Won
Spanish Actors Union	Newcomer Award, Female	Esther Acebo	Nominated
Premios Feroz	Best Drama Series	Money Heist	Nominated
Premios Feroz	Best Lead Actress in a Series	Úrsula Corberó	Nominated
Premios Feroz	Best Lead Actor in a Series	Álvaro Morte	Nominated
Premios Feroz	Best Supporting Actress in a Series	Alba Flores	Nominated
Premios Feroz	Best Supporting Actor in a Series	Paco Tous	Nominated
Premios Iris	Best actress	Úrsula Corberó	Won
Premios Iris	Best series	Money Heist	Nominated
46th International Emmy Awards	Best drama series	Money Heist	Won
MiM Series	Best direction	Jesús Colmenar, Alejandro Bazzano, Miguel Ángel Vivas, Álex Rodrigo	Won
Golden Nymph	Best drama TV series	Money Heist	Won
Premios Fénix	Best series	Money Heist	Nominated
Festival de Luchon	Audience Choice Award	Money Heist	Won
Festival de Luchon	Jury Spanish Series Award	Money Heist	Won
Camille Awards	composer	Iván Martínez Lacámara	Nominated
Camille Awards	composer	Manel Santisteban	Nominated
Camille Awards	Production Company	Vancouver Media	Nominated

=== 2019 ===
2019 award nominations
Award	Category	Nominee(s)	Result
Premios Iris	Best fiction	Money Heist	Won
Premios Iris	Best actor	Álvaro Morte	Won
Premios Iris	Best actress	Alba Flores	Won
Premios Iris	Best direction	Jesús Colmenar, Álex Rodrigo, Koldo Serra, Javier Quintas	Won
Premios Iris	Best production	Cristina López Ferrar	Won
Spanish Actors Union	Lead Performance, Male	Álvaro Morte	Won
Spanish Actors Union	Lead Performance, Female	Alba Flores	Nominated
Spanish Actors Union	Supporting Performance, Male	Jaime Lorente	Nominated

=== 2020 ===
2020 award nominations
Award	Category	Nominee(s)	Result
Premios Feroz	Best drama series	Money Heist	Nominated
Premios Feroz	Best leading actor of a series	Álvaro Morte	Nominated
Premios Feroz	Best supporting actress in a series	Alba Flores	Nominated
Fotogramas de Plata	Audience Award – Best Spanish Series	Money Heist	Nominated
Fotogramas de Plata	Best TV Actor	Álvaro Morte	Nominated
Spanish Actors Union	Performance in a Minor Role, Male	Fernando Cayo	Won
Spanish Actors Union	Lead Performance, Female	Alba Flores	Nominated
Platino Awards	Best Miniseries or TV series	Money Heist	Won
Platino Awards	Best Male Performance in a Miniseries or TV series	Álvaro Morte	Won
Platino Awards	Best Female Performance in a Miniseries or TV series	Úrsula Corberó	Nominated
Platino Awards	Best Female Supporting Performance in a Miniseries or TV series	Alba Flores	Won
