= Joseph Wallace (animator) =

British director

- Occupation: Director
- Years active: 2007–present
- Website: josephwallace.co.uk

Joseph Wallace is a BAFTA Cymru-nominated film and animation director based in the UK. He uses stop-motion puppet and cut-out animation techniques to produce short films and music videos.

== Life and career ==
Wallace grew up in Bristol and developed an interest in animation through short films made by Aardman Animations, the Bristol-based studio known for its stop-motion clay animation techniques. He studied at Newport Film School, receiving a BAFTA Cymru nomination in the "Short Form & Animation" category for his graduation film, The Man Who Was Afraid of Falling, in 2012. He was then made a BBC Performing Arts Fellow in 2015 and included in a list of 32 "Ones to Watch". Wallace has also worked in theatre, and has likened the process of working with animators, and of animators getting to grips with puppets and the characters they represent – building an atmosphere informing the work – to directing a theatre play.

Wallace collaborated with Péter Vácz on the 2016 music video for the track "Dear John" by British band James. Wallace and Vácz had met as students on "Animation Sans Frontières", an animation course, and have collaborated on a number of projects over the years, as well as teaching stop-motion animation together.

External videos
- Sparks Edith Piaf: Behind the Scenes

In 2017, Wallace created a critically acclaimed stop-motion puppet music video for the Sparks song "Edith Piaf (Said It Better Than Me)". Depicting a surreal adventure set in 1930s' Paris, the video used wire puppets moving in cardboard scenery with painted backgrounds and was completed in just six weeks' time. Wallace was given a great amount of artistic freedom for the video and Sparks were very pleased with the result, pronouncing it a "work of art in its own right" that perfectly captured the song's mood, and "perhaps Sparks' best video ever". Wallace subsequently created animated sequences for the 2021 British-American Sparks documentary The Sparks Brothers. Directed by Edgar Wright, the film reviews the 50-year career of Ron and Russell Mael and had its world premiere at the 2021 Sundance Film Festival on January 30, 2021.

2018 saw Wallace make a music video for Parker Bossley's track "Chemicals", using cut-out animation, a technique Wallace had previously employed in a short film titled Natural Disaster. Bossley had seen Natural Disaster and was interested in a video using a similar type of collage animation technique to depict a psychedelic trip in which the lead character metamorphoses into various animals. The video won a nomination in the short film category at the 2019 Palm Springs International Animation Festival.

Wallace has also been working for some years on Salvation Has No Name, a 16-minute stop-motion tale about the refugee crisis, and was invited by Aardman Animations co-founder Peter Lord, who admired Wallace's work, to set up production in Aardman's studio. The film is part-funded by the British Film Institute and will feature the English-language debut of Itziar Ituño as well as the voice of Yasmine Al Massri. The film is executive produced by Game of Thrones star Maisie Williams and BAFTA Cymru winner Lowri Roberts through their company RAPT. Production was interrupted by the COVID-19 pandemic in March 2020, with about a third of the film's shoot completed before moving to Manchester to resume filming in 2021. The film had its world premiere at the Edinburgh International Film Festival on 13 August 2022. In 2024 Wallace collaborated with producer Yoav Segal to create videos for BBC Sounds' The Sleeping Forecast.
