= Berlin (Money Heist) =

Character in Money Heist

- Money Heist character
- First appearance: "Do as Planned" (2017)
- Last appearance: "Happiness Belongs to He Who Loves" (2026)
- Created by: Álex Pina
- Portrayed by: Pedro Alonso

In-universe information
- Full name: Andrés de Fonollosa
- Aliases: Berlin; Sìmon Martínez (in Berlin)
- Occupation: Grand Larcenist, Cracksman
- Weapon: M16; M1911
- Family: "Professor" Sergio Marquina (brother); Raquel Murillo "Lisbon" (sister-in-law)
- Spouses: Tatiana Marse (divorced); Four other wives(divorced)
- Children: Rafael de Fonollosa (son)
- Nationality: Spanish

Berlin (Andrés de Fonollosa) is a fictional character in the Netflix series Money Heist and in its prequel spin-off, Berlin, portrayed by Pedro Alonso. A terminally ill grand larcenist, jewel thief, and cracksman, he is the Professor's second-in-command and brother.

== Character biography ==
The police find out that Berlin's real name is Andrés de Fonollosa and that he is terminally ill during part 1. Meanwhile, he starts a coercive relationship with a hostage named Ariadna. In the final minutes of part 2, Berlin sacrifices himself so that the gang can escape, dying under police fire. Despite his death, he appears in a main role in part 3 through flashbacks to several years earlier, showing his original planning of the Bank of Spain heist and being married to a woman named Tatiana. Berlin is seen to be proficient in other languages than Spanish including English, Italian and Portuguese.

== Characterisation ==
La Voz de Galicia characterised Berlin as a "cold, hypnotic, sophisticated, and disturbing character, an inveterate macho with serious empathy problems, a white-collar thief who despises his colleagues and considers them inferior". Joana Oliveira of El País described Berlin in parts 1 and 2 as "obnoxious" and "a snob, a misogynist, and a bit sadistic", which La Vanguardia contrasted with the character's portrayal in the flashbacks in part 3, where he appeared "much more in love and cuddly". Actor Pedro Alonso described Berlin as "cruel, heroic, and funny at the same time" and saw Berlin's high observational skills and an unusual understanding of his surroundings, resulting in unconventional and unpredictable character behaviour. Although capable of empathy, Berlin often did not show it and was "deeply human and deeply ardent", causing chaos in his interactions with others. Alonso attributed Berlin's popularity to the character's desire to live and "enjoy everything at the moment intensely", living "life as a fantastic dream [...] with great honesty, without abiding by conventions and morals".

== Development ==
Alonso's portrayal of the character was inspired by a chance encounter Alonso had the day before receiving his audition script with "an intelligent person" who was "provocative or even manipulative" to him. Writer Esther Lobato Martinez said Berlin was designed, like all the characters, with "shades of light and dark applied to each so they are both relatable and immoral" as the story unfolded, so that Berlin could be perceived as likeable despite being oppressive to the hostages early on. Similarities between Berlin and Najwa Nimri's character Zulema in Pina's TV series Locked Up were unintentional. The family connection between the Professor and Berlin was not in the original script, but was built into the characters' backstory at the end of part 1 after Morte and Alonso had repeatedly proposed to do so. The writers decided to bring Berlin back for flashbacks in part 3, as they felt the character had gone through a sufficient redemption arc and was popular with the audience. According to writer Javier Gómez Santander, Berlin might not have been killed off at the end of part 2 if the writers had known of the series' renewal.

== Reception ==
Despite or even because of his questionable personality, Berlin was noted as a fan favorite by the producers and critics alike. Netflix's announcement that Berlin would be in part 3 raised media speculation about his role. For the role of Berlin, Alonso won the Actors and Actresses Union Award in 2018 in the category "Best supporting television actor".
