= Salvation Has No Name =

- Directed by: Joseph Wallace
- Screenplay by: Joseph Wallace
- Produced by: Loran Dunn
- Starring: Itziar Ituño; Yasmine Al Masri
- Music by: Kit Wilson
- Animation by: Alfons Mensdorff-Pouilly
- Production companies: Delaval Film; Autour De Minuit; Animation People
- Release date: 13 August 2022
- Running time: 17 minutes
- Countries: United Kingdom; France; Czech Republic
- Language: English

Salvation Has No Name is a 2022 stop motion animated short, written and directed by Joseph Wallace. Told through a dynamic mixture of color and black with a dramatic narrative and international all-female voice cast, it is a unique animated film which explores themes of xenophobia and the refugee crisis.

The film features the voices of Itziar Ituño (Netflix's Money Heist) and Yasmine Al Massri (ABC's Quantico). The short is produced by Loran Dunn for Delaval Film and Exec Produced by Maisie Williams and Lowri Roberts through their company RAPT and co-produced by Autour de Minuit in France and Animation People in Czech Republic. The film is funded by the BFI NETWORK, France Televisions, the CNC and the Czech Film Commission.

Filmed at Aardman Animations studios in Bristol and Media City in Manchester, the film features an original score by Kit Wilson, sound design by David Kamp, with casting by Heather Basten. In August 2022, the refugee organisation Choose Love was announced as the official charity partner of Salvation Has No Name with the intention to use the film as a tool to highlight the plight of refugees through their humanitarian work.

== Plot ==
A troupe of clowns gather to perform a story about a Priest and a refugee but as their misguided tale unfolds, the boundaries between fiction and reality begin to fray.

== Cast ==
- Itziar Ituño as Malabarista / Priest
- Yasmine Al Massri as Woman
- Anna Savva as Pierrot / Gossip
- Katrina Kleve as Piccolo Clown / Tailor
- Elisabetta Spaggiari as Ringmaster / Bookkeeper
- Barbara Sotelsek as Grande Clown / Boucher

== Reception ==
The project was the winner of the 2017 Visegrad Animation Forum pitching competition. The film had its world premiere at the Edinburgh International Film Festival on 13 August 2022 and the North American premiere took place at Rhode Island Film Festival. The film has been since selected at numerous film festivals worldwide including Encounters Short Film Festival, Uppsala International Short Film Festival, Aesthetica Short Film Festival, Cinanima, London International Animation Festival and Rio de Janeiro International Short Film Festival.

Salvation Has No Name was nominated for the McLaren Award for Animation at the Edinburgh Film Festival, received the Special Mention for Best Independent Short Award at Stop Motion Montréal in September 2022 and won both the Grand Prix for Best Short Film and the Best Direction award at Animage in November 2022.

In January 2023, it was announced the film was long-listed for the British Short Animation BAFTA 2023.
