= Berlin (Spanish TV series) =

Spanish heist crime drama television series

- Spanish: La casa de papel: Berlín
- Created by: Álex Pina; Esther Martínez Lobato
- Starring: Pedro Alonso; Samantha Siqueiros; Tristán Ulloa; Michelle Jenner; Begoña Vargas; Julio Peña Fernández; Joel Sánchez; Maria Isabel "Masi" Rodríguez
- Opening theme: "Bullets and Flowers" by Francis White (ft. Nikki Garcia)
- Country of origin: Spain
- Original languages: Spanish and French
- No. of seasons: 2
- No. of episodes: 16

Production
- Executive producers: Álex Pina; Esther Martínez Lobato; Albert Pintó; Cristina López Ferraz
- Production locations: Spain; France
- Camera setup: Single-camera
- Running time: 41–81 minutes
- Production company: Vancouver Media

Original release
- Network: Netflix
- Release: 29 December 2023 – 15 May 2026

Related
- Money Heist

Berlin (also known as Money Heist: Berlin, in Spanish La casa de papel: Berlín) is a Spanish television series created by Álex Pina and Esther Martínez Lobato for Netflix. A prequel to Money Heist, it focuses on the life of Andrés de Fonollosa, aka "Berlin", before the events of the first two seasons of the original series. It stars Pedro Alonso, Michelle Jenner, Tristán Ulloa, Begoña Vargas, and Julio Peña Fernández. The series premiered on 29 December 2023 and consists of eight episodes. The seasons are released as separate miniseries, with the first titled Berlin and the Jewels of Paris.

On 19 February 2024, the show was renewed for a second season, Berlin and the Lady with an Ermine, which was released on 15 May 2026.

== Premise ==
Many years before the events of Money Heist, Berlin made another heist, stealing €44 million in jewels and framing the one who provided the security for it. He was the leader of a criminal gang by then, Keila, Damián, Cameron, Bruce, and Roi. The series is primarily set in Paris. Things get complicated when, while spying on the victim to be framed, he falls in love with the victim's wife.

== Cast ==
=== Main ===
- Pedro Alonso as Andrés de Fonollosa or "Berlin"
- Samantha Siqueiros as Camille
- Tristán Ulloa as Damián
- Michelle Jenner as Keila
- Begoña Vargas as Cameron
- Julio Peña Fernández as Roi
- Joel Sánchez as Bruce
- Maria Isabel "Masi" Rodríguez as Susi

=== Supporting ===
- Itziar Ituño as Raquel Murillo
- Najwa Nimri as Alicia Sierra
- Miko Jarry as Olivier
- Martín Aslan as Alain
- Belén López as Eris (Limoncello Lady)
- Álvaro Morte as The Professor (guest, season 2)

== Episodes ==
Series	Season title	Episodes	Originally released
1	Berlin and the Jewels of Paris	8	29 December 2023
2	Berlin and the Lady with an Ermine	8	15 May 2026

=== Season 1: Berlin and the Jewels of Paris (2023) ===
No. overall	No. in season	Title	Directed by	Written by	Original release date
1	1	"The Energy of Love" (La energía del amor)	Albert Pintó, David Barrocal and Geoffrey Cowper	Álex Pina, Esther Martínez Lobato, David Barrocal and David Oliva	29 December 2023
2	2	"Anchor and Lobo" (El ancla y el lobo)	Albert Pintó, David Barrocal and Geoffrey Cowper	Álex Pina, Esther Martínez Lobato, David Barrocal and David Oliva	29 December 2023
3	3	"Full House of Embryos" (Póker de embriones)	David Barrocal, Albert Pintó and Geoffrey Cowper	Álex Pina, Esther Martínez Lobato, David Barrocal and David Oliva	29 December 2023
4	4	"An Aquarium on Your Back" (Un aquarium en la espalda)	Geoffrey Cowper, Albert Pintó and David Barrocal	Álex Pina, Esther Martínez Lobato, David Barrocal and David Oliva	29 December 2023
5	5	"After Love" (After Love)	Albert Pintó, David Barrocal and Geoffrey Cowper	Álex Pina, Esther Martínez Lobato, David Barrocal, David Oliva and Lorena G. Maldonado	29 December 2023
6	6	"Night of the Lemons" (La noche de los limones)	David Barrocal, Albert Pintó and Geoffrey Cowper	Álex Pina, Esther Martínez Lobato, David Oliva, Lorena G. Maldonado and Luis Garrido	29 December 2023
7	7	"The Last Virgin in the Western World" (La útlima virgen de Occidente)	David Barrocal, Albert Pintó and Geoffrey Cowper	Álex Pina, Esther Martínez Lobato, David Oliva, Lorena G. Maldonado and Luis Garrido	29 December 2023
8	8	"An Endangered Elephant" (Un elefante en peligro de extinción)	Albert Pintó, David Barrocal and Geoffrey Cowper	Álex Pina, Esther Martínez Lobato, David Oliva, Lorena G. Maldonado and Luis Garrido	29 December 2023

=== Season 2: Berlin and the Lady with an Ermine (2026) ===
No. overall	No. in season	Title	Directed by	Written by	Original release date
9	1	"The Collection" (La colección)	Albert Pintó	Álex Pina, Esther Martínez Lobato, David Barrocal, Lorena G. Maldonado, Itziar Sanjuán, Humberto Ortega, Luis Garrido Julve	15 May 2026
10	2	"An Ode to Life" (Un canto a la vida)	Unknown	Unknown	15 May 2026
11	3	"Stendhal Syndrome" (El síndrome de Stendhal)	Unknown	Unknown	15 May 2026
12	4	"Oranges from China" (Naranjas de la China)	Unknown	Unknown	15 May 2026
13	5	"Demolition Boys" (Demolition Boys)	Unknown	Unknown	15 May 2026
14	6	"Pomelo Loves Mandarin" (Pomelo Loves Mandarina)	Unknown	Unknown	15 May 2026
15	7	"Night of the Double Dodge" (La noche de las dos cobras)	Unknown	Unknown	15 May 2026
16	8	"Happiness Belongs to He Who Loves" (La felicidad es del que ama)	Unknown	Unknown	15 May 2026

== Production ==
In late November 2021, days before the release of the second volume of the fifth part of Money Heist, Netflix announced that it was developing a spin-off series, Berlin, for a tentative 2023 release, with Pedro Alonso expected to reprise his character Berlin from the original series, and Money Heist creator and executive producers Álex Pina and Esther Martínez Lobato at the helm. On 28 September 2022, Michelle Jenner, Begoña Vargas, Tristán Ulloa, Julio Peña Fernández and Joel Sánchez were cast to co-star alongside Alonso. In March 2023, it was announced that Itziar Ituño and Najwa Nimri would also be reprising their roles as Raquel Murillo and Alicia Sierra from Money Heist. Filming began in October 2022 in Paris, France, and continued in Madrid, Spain.

Creators Alex Pina and Esther Martínez Lobato wanted to do something "lighter" after their previous recent projects. In comparison to its parent show Money Heist, Berlin has more comedic tones and employed more actors and locations. The series was shot in a wider screen 2:1 ratio to give the characters "more of a scenic experience of their surroundings".

The second season had begun filming by 23 January 2025. The season sees the return of the Professor (Álvaro Morte) from Money Heist, who is Berlin's brother.

The series creator has announced that there will not be a third season.

== Release ==
The series premiered on Netflix on 29 December 2023 and consists of eight episodes. In the first week of its premiere, it became the most-watched series worldwide and reached the Top 10 list in 91 countries. By February 2024, it was the ninth most-watched non-English show in Netflix history, with 53.1 million views, and had remained on the Top 10 non-English TV list for seven consecutive weeks.

On 19 February 2024, the show was renewed for a second season, which was released on 15 May 2026.

Netflix separated Berlin's seasons into distinct miniseries, with season 1 titled Berlin and the Jewels of Paris and season 2 titled Berlin and the Lady with an Ermine.

== Critical reception ==
On review aggregator Rotten Tomatoes, Berlin and the Jewels of Paris has an approval rating of 70% based on 10 reviews.

The Daily Beast's Noel Murray felt the plot and new characters did not hold up to the original Money Heist.
