= The Silence of the Marsh =

2019 Spanish mystery thriller film by Marc Vigil

- Film poster
- Spanish: El Silencio del pantano
- Directed by: Marc Vigil
- Written by: Carlos de Pando; Sara Autuña
- Based on: El Silencio del pantano by Juanjo Braulio
- Produced by: Iñaki Juaristi; Antonio Asensio
- Starring: Pedro Alonso; Àlex Monner; Raúl Prieto
- Music by: Zeltia Montes
- Production companies: RTVE; TV3; Zeta Cinema
- Distributed by: Netflix
- Release dates: 15 November 2019 (SEFF); 1 January 2020 (Spain)
- Running time: 92 minutes
- Country: Spain
- Language: Spanish

The Silence of the Marsh (Spanish: El Silencio del pantano, also known as The Swamp's Silence) is a 2019 Spanish mystery thriller web film directed by Marc Vigil. The film stars Pedro Alonso, Àlex Monner and Carmina Barrios in the lead roles. The plot of the film is based on a Juanjo Braulio novel of the same name and the story revolves around a journalist-turned-crime-novelist who also commits crime. The film originally premiered at the 2019 Seville European Film Festival. It was theatrically released in Spain on 1 January 2020. The Silence of the Marsh was made available for streaming on Netflix on 22 April 2020 and opened to mixed reviews from critics.

== Cast ==
- Pedro Alonso as Q
- Carmina Barrios as La Puri
- Àlex Monner as Fran
- Raúl Prieto as Nacho
- Nacho Fresneda as Falconetti
- José Ángel Egido as Carreterro
- Maite Sandoval
- Luis Zahera as Taxista
- Javier Godino as Vicent
- Zaira Romero as Sara

== Production ==
The principal photography of the film was held for a period of seven weeks and the portions of the film were mostly filmed across Valencia.
