= Agujeros en el cielo =

2004 Spanish drama film

- Film poster
- Directed by: Pedro Mari Santos
- Screenplay by: Pedro Mari Santos
- Produced by: María Cabanas; Jennifer Nelson
- Starring: Ander Lipus; Montse Zabalza; Itziar Ituño; Aiora Sedano; Víctor Palacio; Alfonso Torregrosa
- Cinematography: Enrique Urdánoz
- Music by: Fernando Velázquez
- Production company: ITP Producciones Audiovisuales
- Distributed by: Barton Films
- Release date: 9 January 2004
- Country: Spain
- Language: Spanish

Agujeros en el cielo (lit. 'Holes in the Sky') is a 2004 Spanish drama film written and directed by Pedro Mari Santos. It stars Ander Lipus and Montse Zabalza.

== Plot ==
The film follows the mishaps of radio announcer Pablo, who is persuaded by a working colleague to pay some thugs to beat up another workmate. As the affair gets out of hand, resulting on death, Pablo moves to his birthplace, joining a local radio station and re-acquainting with his long love interest Marta.

== Cast ==
- Ander Lipus as Pablo
- Montse Zabalza as Marta
- Itziar Ituño as Elena
- Alberto San Juan
- Melani Olivares
- Saturnino García
- Ramón Barea
- Alfonso Torregrosa as Koldo
- Aiora Sedano as Leire

== Production ==
Shooting locations included Bilbao, Plentzia, Gorliz, Mundaka, Getxo, and Sopelana.

== Release ==
The film was released theatrically in Spain on 9 January 2004 by Barton Films.

== Reception ==
Javier Ocaña of El País declared that the result is "nothing more than a vain attempt at existential and cinematographic reflection", otherwise resenting the "pedantic, stiff, almost lyrical" register of the protagonist.

== See also ==
- List of Spanish films of 2004
