= Professor (Money Heist) =

Fictional character

- Money Heist character
- First appearance: "Do as Planned" (2017)
- Last appearance: "Happiness Belongs to He Who Loves" (2026)
- Created by: Álex Pina
- Portrayed by: Álvaro Morte

In-universe information
- Full name: Sergio Marquina
- Aliases: The Professor; Salvador "Salva" Martín
- Occupation: Thief (Bank Robber)
- Family: Jesús Marquina (father, deceased); Andrés de Fonollosa "Berlin" (older brother, deceased); Rafael de Fonollosa (nephew); Paula Vicuña (stepdaughter); Mariví Fuentes (mother-in-law); Marta/Laura Murillo (sister-in-law); Tatiana Marse (former sister-in-law)
- Spouse: Raquel Murillo
- Nationality: Spanish

The Professor (Sergio Marquina) is a fictional character in the Netflix series Money Heist, portrayed by Álvaro Morte. He is the mastermind of the heist who assembled the group, as well as Berlin's long lost brother.

== Character biography ==
The Professor, real name Sergio, was born in San Sebastián and mostly grew up in hospitals due to being a sick child. He leads the gang, and is the one who carefully plans and organises the heist in the Royal Mint and the Bank of Spain. The idea of the first heist is to avenge his father, whose idea it originally was. His grandfather had fought against the fascists in Italy. He was the mastermind behind the plans of the two heists. He controlled the heist through a hiding outside the Royal Mint. The Professor falls in love with Raquel Murillo, a police investigator leading the case against the heist. Under the false identity of Salvador "Salva" Martín, he was able to get closer to the lead inspector assigned to the Royal Mint robbery, Raquel Murillo, and the pair eventually fell in love. Raquel then joins the gang by the name "Lisbon". He sleeps with her and when her mother finds out about his involvement with the heist, he attempts to poison her but pulls out at the last second, opting to take advantage of her poor memory and deleting the voicemail, which contained crucial information that would expose him.. The Professor spent years of his life meticulously planning the heist, and covered aspects that most people wouldn’t think of. His tactic was to lead the police to several dead ends to buy more time for the money to be printed and the team to escape.

== Characterization ==
Elena Pita of El Mundo described the character as "enigmatic". Alvaro Morte said the character was a "workaholic". He linked the Professor to his role of Óscar in El embarcadero, both of whom "had to be demonized". He said that viewers felt close to the character because he generates empathy, and that "if the viewer does not empathize with the Professor or Oscar, the series does not work".

== Development ==
Early in development, the Professor was intended to be the narrator of the series. Writer Javier Gómez Santander compared the writing process to the Professor's way of thinking, "going around, writing down options, consulting engineers whom you cannot tell why you ask them that", but noted that fiction allowed the police to be written as dumber or more inept when necessary.

The Professor was designed as a charismatic yet shy villain who could convince the robbers to follow him and make the audience sympathetic to the robbers' resistance against the powerful banks. However, developing the Professor's role proved difficult, as the character did not follow typal conventions and the producers were uncertain about his degree of brilliance. While the producers found his "Salva" alter ego early on, they were originally looking for a 50-year-old Harvard professor type with the looks of Spanish actor José Coronado. The role was proposed to Javier Gutiérrez, who declined because he was already committed to starring in the film Campeones.

Meanwhile, the casting directors advocated for Álvaro Morte, whom they knew from their collaboration on the long-running Spanish soap opera El secreto de Puente Viejo, even though his prime time television experience was limited at that point. Going through the full casting process and approaching the role through external analysis rather than personal experience, Morte described the Professor as "a tremendous box of surprises" that "end up shaping this character because he never ceases to generate uncertainty", making it unclear for the audience if the character is good or bad. The producers also likened his appearance to that of a primary school teacher and believed this gave the character more credibility. The Professor's glasses were initially red and more prominent, but in the end the producers preferred a more discreet option and in a darker tone. The Professor's fascination with origami was proposed by Morte.

Creator Álex Pina saw Raquel's story as a formerly abused wife falling in love with the Professor "as very powerful, very romantic". That they come from two opposite sides was "intended to enhance the genre" and something that the producers "wanted to exploit". Le Monde said, "The game between Professor and Raquel, the inspector in charge of the negotiations, is brilliant. A step of two with fluidity and anticipation. To ignore one's enemy is to condemn oneself to defeat. It therefore requires to enter into his intimacy. Morte said the Professor would not necessarily prioritize love over other risks in part 3, saying that if 'he didn't have that other dark part, it wouldn't work either'. The Professor's trick that hooks us so much is that we never know what goes through his mind, what he is thinking. I try to give that ambiguity." The character's anger about Berlin's death spawned the character's motivation for part 3, and was an idea Morte gave the producers. In September 2019, Morte considered the Professor a "very interesting character" who had more of a story left to tell. Morte said about part 4, "the teacher makes a descent into hell."

== Reception ==
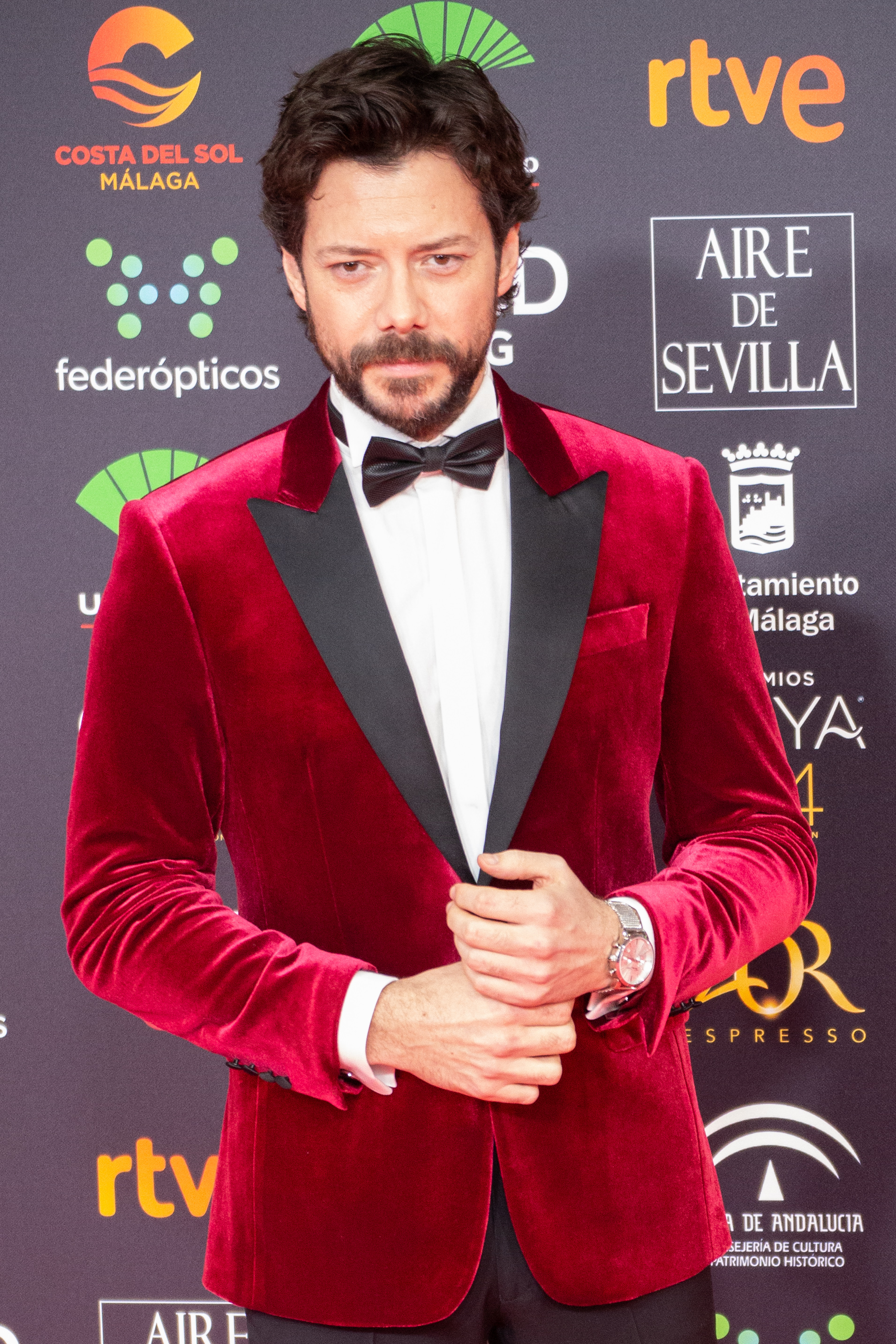
Morte at the 34th Goya Awards in 2020.

The Professor is one of the fan favorites of the series. For his role, Alvaro Morte was nominated for the Actors and Actresses Union Awards in 2018 in the category "Best television actor" and won it in 2019, won the 21st Iris Awards in 2019 for Best Actor, and was nominated for the Premios Feroz in 2020 for Best Leading Actor of a Series.
