= Pedro Alonso =

Spanish actor (born 1971)

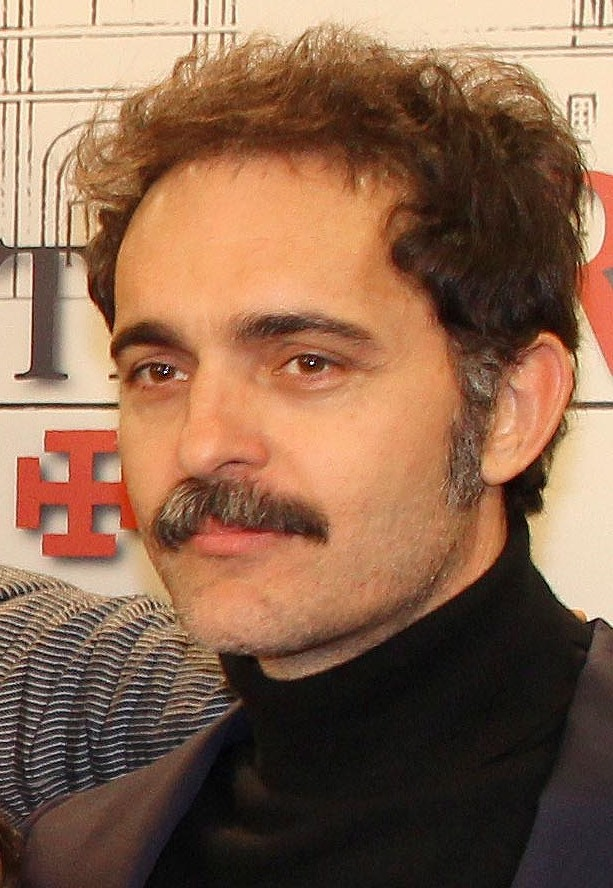
- Alonso in 2015
- Born: Pedro González Alonso; 21 June 1971 (age 55); Vigo, Galicia, Spain
- Education: RESAD
- Occupations: Actor; writer; artist
- Years active: 1995–present
- Children: 1

Pedro González Alonso (born 21 June 1971) is a Spanish actor, writer, and artist. He is best known for his role of Andrés "Berlin" de Fonollosa in the Spanish heist series Money Heist (La casa de papel) and its spin-off Berlin, and for the role of Diego Murquía in the historical drama series Gran Hotel.

== Early life ==
Pedro González Alonso was born in Vigo, Spain. He studied at Royal School of Dramatic Arts (RESAD) in Madrid, graduating in 1992, and at Teatro de la Danza (Theatre of Dance). He is also a writer and artist, publishing his work under the name Pedro Alonso O'choro.

== Career ==
Alonso is known for his performances on television in Rías Baixas (2003–2005), Maridos e mulleres (2006–2008), Padre Casares (2008–2015), and Gondar (2009) at a local level in Galicia and nationally for playing characters such as Diego Murquía / Adrián Vera Celande in historical drama Gran Hotel. He played the role of Andrés "Berlin" de Fonollosa in the crime drama series Money Heist (La casa de papel), which aired on Antena 3 in 2017 and was later broadcast on Netflix. In 2018, he was chosen as "International Star of the Year" by GQ Turkey magazine. He co-starred in Diablo Guardián, Amazon Prime Video’s first drama series in Latin America, which was released in May, 2018. In 2019, Alonso played the leading role in the mystery thriller The Silence of the Marsh. He reprised his role of Berlin in a spin-off series of the same name, which premiered in 2023. In 2025 and 2026, Alonso appeared in Alfa Romeo Junior's "Learn to Love Again" advertising trilogy, including "Salesman", "Cuore Matto", and "Interrogation".

== Personal life ==
Alonso is in a relationship with Parisian hypnotherapist and artist Tatiana Djordjevic. He also has a daughter from a previous relationship. He is ambidextrous and speaks Spanish, Galician, Catalan, and English.

== Filmography ==
=== Film ===
Year	Title	Role	Notes
1995	Hábitos		Short film
1996	Alma gitana	Antonio	
1996	Tengo una casa	Ferrari	
1996	Paranoia dixital	Guy	Short film
1997	Niño nadie	Alex	
1997	Las vacaciones de Clara	Alan	Short film
1997	El pliegue del hipocampo	Xavi	Short film
1998	Insomnio	Miguel	
2003	Noviembre	Guard	
2005	El Calentito	Marcos	
2005	La noche del hermano	Club Porter	
2010	18 Meals	Vladimir Torres	
2010	Todo lo que tú quieras	Pedro	
2011	Un día normal	Professor	Short film
2011	Onde está a Felicidade?	Ramon	
2012	O Apóstolo	Pilgrim	Voice
2013	Maldito lunes	Rafa	Short film
2015	Retribution	Contreras	Voice
2015	La playa de los ahogados	Marcos Valverde	
2019	The Silence of the Marsh	Q	
2023	Awareness	Vicente	

=== Television ===
Year	Title	Role	Notes
1997	Todos los hombres sois iguales	Raúl	5 episodes
1998	A las once en casa	Alejo	28 episodes
2000	Raquel busca su sitio		Series 1, episode 3: "David contra David"
2000	¡Qué grande es el teatro!	Gonzalo	Episode: "La hermana pequeña"
2001	Pequeno hotel		Series 1, episode 1: "Un día apurado"
2002	El comisario	Iván	Series 5, episode 9: "Cuatro, Tres, Dos..."
2003	Código fuego	Tomás	
2003–05	Rías Baixas		
2005	Hospital Central	Curro Gómez	Series 10, episode 1: "El gas de la risa"
2005	La Atlántida	Boris	Television film
2005	As leis de Celavella	Amancio	Series 3, episode 20: "Santa Teresa"
2006–08	Maridos e mulleres	Carlos	
2006	A vida por diante		Series 2, episode 4: "O roubo"
2007	R.I.S. Científica	Héctor	Series 1, episode 6: "Miedo escénico"
2008–15	Padre Casares	Father Horacio Casares	Series 1–8, 14, 16
2008	La bella Otero	Venancio Romero	
2008	El espejo	Álvaro	Television film
2009	Gondar	Pedro Sotelo	
2011	14 de abril. La República		2 episodes
2011–13	Gran Hotel	Diego Murquía / Adrián Vera Celande	
2014–15	Bajo sospecha	Roberto Vega Sánchez	8 episodes
2015	Hospital Real	Andrés Osorio	
2016	El ministerio del tiempo	Lieutenant Cerezo	2 episodes
2016	La embajada	Pablo Villar	
2017–2021	Money Heist	Andrés de Fonollosa / Berlin	41 episodes
2017–18	Traición	Roberto Fuentes del Riego	
2018	Diablo Guardián	Gallego	3 episodes

=== NetFlix ===
Year	Title	Role	Notes
2017-2021	La Casa de Papel	Andrés de Fonollosa, dit « Berlin »	5 saisons
2023–present	Berlin	Andrés de Fonollosa, dit « Berlin »	

== Awards and nominations ==
Year	Award	Category	Work	Result	Ref.
2009	Golden Nymph	Outstanding Actor	Padre Casares	Nominated	
2009	Mestre Mateo Awards	Best Actor	Padre Casares	Nominated	
2010	Mestre Mateo Awards	Best Actor	Padre Casares	Nominated	
2014	Mestre Mateo Awards	Best Supporting Actor	Gran Hotel	Nominated	
2018	Fotogramas de Plata	Best TV Actor	Money Heist	Nominated	
2018	27th Actors and Actresses Union Awards	Television: Supporting Performance, Male	Money Heist	Won	
2020	Filming Italy Best Movie Award	International Award	—N/a	Won	
2024	Premios Aura	Best Actor in Drama series	Berlin	Won	

== Bibliography ==
- Alonso O'choro, Pedro (2020). Libro de Filipo / Book of Philippus. Grijalbo Ilustrados. ISBN 978-8417752620.
