= Raquel Murillo =

Character in Money Heist

- Money Heist character
- First appearance: "Do as Planned" (2017)
- Last appearance: "An Endangered Elephant" (2023)
- Created by: Álex Pina
- Portrayed by: Itziar Ituño

In-universe information
- Alias: Lisbon; Mrs. Professor
- Occupation: Inspector (formerly); Grand Larcenist
- Spouse: Alberto Vicuña (ex-husband); Professor
- Children: Paula Vicuña Murillo (daughter)
- Relatives: Mariví Fuentes (mother) Marta/Laura Murillo (younger sister)
- Nationality: Spanish

Raquel Murillo ([raˈkel muˈɾi.ʝo], later adopting the codename "Lisbon") is a fictional character in the Netflix series Money Heist and Berlin, portrayed by Itziar Ituño. She was an inspector for the National Police Corps who was put in charge of the investigation before she was forced to resign for failing to stop the robbery at the Royal Mint. Later she joined the group of robbers to rob the Bank of Spain.

== Character biography ==
Raquel is an inspector for the National Police Corps tasked with negotiating with the robbers in parts 1 and 2. However, during the negotiations, she meets the Professor, who introduces himself to her in a bar under the name Salvador Martín, and embarks on a relationship with him. She falls in love with him to the point of choosing to follow him instead of arresting him, spurred on when she is embarrassed and shunned by her colleagues for bad decisions she made while in charge of the investigation. A year after releasing the professor, she follows him to the Philippines and becomes a member of the gang. Like the rest of the gang members, she takes the name of a city (Lisbon) to hide her identity.

== Characterisation ==
Ituño described Raquel as a "strong and powerful woman in a world of men, but also sensitive in her private life". She took inspiration from The Silence of the Lambs character Clarice Starling, an FBI student with a messy family life who develops sympathies for a criminal. Creator Álex Pina saw Raquel's story as a formerly abused wife falling in love with the Professor "as very powerful, very romantic". That they come from two opposite sides was "intended to enhance the genre" and something that the producers "wanted to exploit".
