= Camille Awards =

Belgium television awards

- European Film Composer Awards
- The logo
- Awarded for: European film music and its composers
- Country: Belgium
- Presented by: ECSA
- Formerly called: Grand Scores
- First award: 2014
- Website: camilleawards.eu

Television/radio coverage
- Directed by: Bernard Grimaldi

Camille Awards - European Film Composer Awards, are Brussels-based film awards created in 2014, named in tribute to Camille Saint-Saëns, composer of the first music to be scored for the movie The Assassination of the Duke of Guise (1908), as a celebration of European film music and its composers.

== Editions ==
=== 2016 ===
The 2016 edition took place in Berlin, Germany on 10 February 2016.

Best Orchestral Score

- Bruno Coulais (France) for Le chant de la Mer (Song of the Sea)
- Pascal Gaigne (Spain) for Loreak (Flowers)
- Gary Yershon (United Kingdom) for Mr Turner

Best Electro-Acoustic Score

- Timo Hietala (Finland) for Aikuisten Poika (Boy Upside Down)
- Trond Bjerknes (Norway) for Operasjon Arktis (Operation Arctic)
- Jonas Struck (Denmark) for Idealisten (The Idealist)

=== 2017 ===
The 2017 edition took place in Berlin, Germany on 2 February 2017.

==== Winners ====
- Best Orchestral Score – Gaute Storaas for En Man Som Heter Ove (A Man Called Ove)
- Best Orchestral Score – Clint Mansell for High Rise
- Best Electro-Acoustic Score – Sophia Ersson for Pojkarna (Girls Lost)
- Best Original Music for a Series – Víctor Reyes for The Night Manager

=== 2018 ===
The 2018 edition took place in Pula, Croatia on 19–21 October 2018.

Best Orchestral Score

- Ginge Anvik (Norway) for Askeladden: I Dovregubbens hall
- Lasse Enersen (Finland) for The Unknown Soldier
- Dario Marianelli (United Kingdom) for Paddington 2

Best Electro-acoustic Score

- Ola Fløttum (Norway) for Thelma
- Adrian Foulkes & Lucio Godoy (Spain) for La niebla y la doncella
- Jonas Struck (Denmark) for QEDA

Best Original Music for a Series

- Lorne Balfe & Rupert Gregson-Williams (United Kingdom) for The Crown second season
- Jacob Groth (Denmark) for Modus second season
- Ivan Martinez Lacámara & Manel Santisteban (Spain) for La casa de papel

=== 2020 ===
2019 edition not was disputed, 2020 took place in Brussels, Belgium on 3 February 2020.

- Lifetime Achievement: Ennio Morricone

=== 2021 ===
The 2021 edition took place online, due to the Covid-19 pandemic, on 8 April 2021. The ceremony premiered live on ECSA’s YouTube channel.

==== Winners ====
- Best Orchestral Score – Johan Ramström (Sweden) for “Sara with All Her Being”
- Best Electro-Acoustic Score – John Gürtler (Germany) for “Systemsprenger”
- Best Original Music for a Series – Labrinth (United Kingdom) for “Euphoria”

=== 2022 ===
The 2022 edition took place in Split, Croatia on 27 September 2022.

==== Winners ====
- Best Film Score – Johan Söderqvist (Sweden) for “Utvandrarna (The Emigrants)”
- Best Score for a Feature Documentary – Nainita Desai (UK) for “The Reason I Jump”
- Best Original Music for a Series – Manel Santisteban & Iván Martínez Lacámara (Spain) for “La Casa de Papel” (Season 5)

The Lifetime Achievement Award was awarded to renown Croatian film, theatre and TV music composer Alfi Kabiljo.

=== 2024 ===
The 2024 edition of the Camille Awards took place in Paris, France, on 13 November 2024.

== See also ==
- Camille Saint-Saëns
