= Itziar Ituño =

Spanish actress (born 1974)

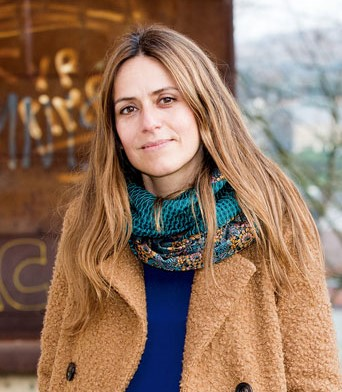
- Itziar Ituño
- Born: Itziar Ituño Martínez; 18 June 1974 (age 51); Basauri, Biscay, Spain
- Occupation: Actress
- Years active: 1996–present

Itziar Ituño Martínez (born 18 June 1974) is a Spanish actress who performs in Basque as well as in Spanish. She is best known for her role as Inspector Raquel Murillo in the television series Money Heist.

== Early life ==
Ituño was born in Basauri, on 18 June 1974. She studied acting at the Basauri Theater School and also graduated in urban-industrial and political sociology from the University of the Basque Country.

== Career ==
Ituño's first appearance was in the Basque film Agur Olentzero, agur (Goodbye Olentzero, Goodbye) which was released in 1997.

In 2001 she got a role in the soap opera Goenkale. In this television series, she played Nekane Beitia, a bisexual policewoman from the fictional village of Arralde. She played the role until 2015, when the show was canceled. This role increased her visibility in the Basque Country.

She continued to work as an actress, starring in the films Loreak (Spanish submission for the Academy Awards) and Igelak, released in 2015 and 2016 respectively. In 2017, she starred in the television series La casa de papel (broadcast on Antena 3 and then acquired by Netflix) in the role of Raquel Murillo, a police inspector.

In addition to her film, television, and theater roles, she is also a singer in three bands: Dangiliske, EZ3, and INGOT.

On 26 September 2017, she was a presenter of the Basque Film Gala and the EITB Gala for the 65th edition of the San Sebastian International Film Festival.

It was announced in May 2020 that Ituño will make her English language debut in the British animated short film Salvation Has No Name, due for release in 2020.

== Filmography ==
=== Film ===
Year	Title	Role	Notes
1996	Ricardo		Short film
1996	La lección		Short film
1996	Al, Ben & Gail		Short film
1997	Agur Olentzero, agurǃ		TV movie
1998	Otxate		Short film
2003	El final de la noche	Raquel	Main role
2004	Agujeros en el cielo	Elena	Main role
2005	Seré tus ojos		Short film
2005	Arkadia		
2007	Silencios		Short film
2008	Entereza		Short film
2010	Izarren Argia	Sor Angustias	Supporting role
2012	Bárbara		Short film
2012	Dragoi Ehiztaria	Maddalen	Main role
2014	Sabin	Paulina Arana	TV movie
2014	Loreak	Lourdes	Main role
2014	Lasa eta Zabala	Amaia	Main role
2014	El Buen Mal	Woman	Short film
2015	Un otoño sin Berlín	Sofía	Supporting role
2016	Igelak	Carmen	Supporting role
2017	Morir	Nurse	Supporting role
2017	Errementari	Ana	Supporting role
2017	For the Good Times	Ainhoa	Short film
2017	Tarde para el recreo	Mother	Short film
2018	Basque selfie	Ane	Main role
2019	Voces	Aitana	Short film
2019	Lekitxoko Etxea	Maitane	Short film
2019	El silencio de la ciudad blanca	Doctor Guevara	Supporting role
2020	Hil Kanpaiak	Karmen	Main role
2020	Ilargi guztiak		Main role
2020	Nora		
2020	Salvation Has No Name	Priest (voice)	Short film
2022	Irati	Mari	Supporting role
2023	Las buenas compañías (In the Company of Women)		

=== Television ===
Year	Title	Role	Channel	Notes	Ref
1999–2001, 2005–2015	Goenkale	Nekane Beitia	ETB 1	More than 1,500 episodes: Recurring cast (1999, 2000–2001, 2004–2005); Main cast (1999–2000, 2005–2015)	
2000	Ander eta konpainia		ETB 1	Guest role	
2000–2001	Teilatupean		ETB 1	Supporting role	
2002	Kilker dema		ETB 1	Guest role	
2002	Platos sucios		ETB 2	Guest role	
2010	Goenkale 3000	Herself	ETB 1	TV special	
2010	Euskal Kantuen Gaua	Herself	ETB 1	Christmas Eve TV special	
2011	Vaya Semanita		ETB 2	Guest role	
2012	Finlandia	Herself	ETB 1	Episodeː "Naroa Agirre eta Itziar Ituño"	
2012	30 Urte Gozaaaatzen!	Herself	ETB 1	New Year's Eve TV special	
2014	Euskal Kantuen Gaua	Herself	ETB 1	Christmas Eve TV special	
2015	Zuek hor	Herself	ETB 1	Episodeː "Itziar Ituño eta Iñigo Segurola"	
2015	Soinu ehiztaria	Herself	ETB 1	Guest (1 episode)	
2015-16	Kaixo 2016	Herself	ETB 1	New Year's Eve TV special	
2016	Pintxo & Pote	Herself	ETB 1	Brief appearance (1 episode)	
2017	Cuéntame cómo pasó	Koro Zabaleta	TVE	Guest (5 episodes)	
2017	Pulsaciones	Guest actress	Antena 3	1 episode	
2017–2021	La Casa de Papel	Raquel Murillo / Lisbon	Antena 3 / Netflix	Main role (40 episodes)	
2018	Goenkale 18	Herself	ETB 1	TV special	
2018	Gure kasa	Herself	ETB 1	Episodeː "Itziar Ituño"	
2018	Bilboko Aste Nagusia 2018	Herself	ETB 1	Guest (1 episode)	
2019	Gure doinuak	Herself	ETB 1	Episodeː "Itziar Ituño eta Nerbioi Ibarra"	
2019	Nunca es tarde	Herself	Fox Sports Sur	Guest (1 episode)	
2019	O Programa de Cristina	Herself	SIC	Guest (1 episode)	
2019	Egunak egin du	Herself	ETB 1	Collaborator (1 episode)	
2019	Gabonǃ Kantantzera gatozǃ	Herself	ETB 1	Christmas Eve TV special	
2020	Vivement dimanche	Herself	France 2	Guest (1 episode)	
2020	Barre librea	Herself	ETB 1	Guest (1 episode)	
2020	Mask Singer	The Ballerina	TF1	Guest (1 episode)	
2022	Intimacy	Malen Zubiri	Netflix	Main role (8 episodes)	
TBA	Alardea		ETB 1	Miniseries	
2023	Berlin	Raquel Murillo / Lisbon	Netflix	TBA	
2023	¿Quién es la máscara? Uruguay	Chameleon	Teledoce	Contestant; 1st. Eliminated	
2025	The Crystal Cuckoo	Marta Ruiz	Netflix	Supporting role (6 episodes)	

=== Theater ===
- Izarrak/Estrellas (2003).
- Pakitarentzat Bakarrik (2004).
- Zeta/Seda (2005).
- Jostailuen Istorioak/Historia de juguetes (2005).
- Lapurzuola/Cueva de ladrones (2007).
- Grönholm Metodoa (2008).
- AURI-AURI (2010).
- Ilunpetan/El Apagón (2010).
- Amantalaren Ahotsa (2011).
- Herioa eta Dontzeila (2012).
- Hitzak/Palabras (2013–2014).
- Koadernoa Zuri/Cuaderno en blanco (2016–2017).
- Desoxirribonucleico (2017).
- Funtzak (2017).
- Yo soy Pichichi (2018)
- La Tarara (2022)
