= Yasmine Al Massri =

Lebanese-American actress

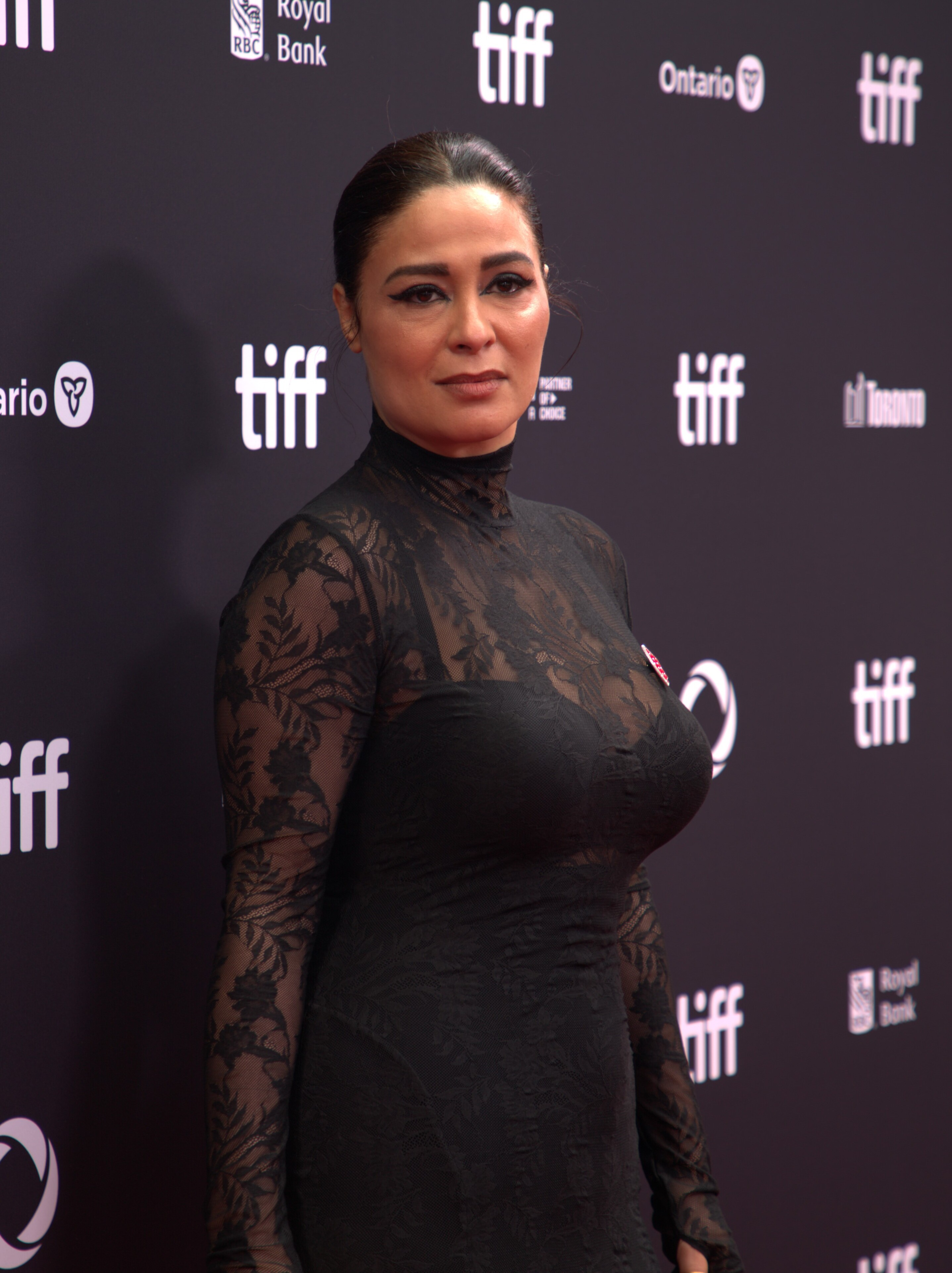
- Al Massri in 2025 at TIFF.
- Born: 1978 (age 47–48); Beirut, Lebanon
- Occupation: Actress
- Years active: 2007–present

Yasmine Al Massri (Arabic: ياسمين المصري; born 1978) is a Palestinian-French actress, dancer, video artist and human rights advocate. She made her film debut in the 2007 film Caramel. In 2015, Massri starred as Nimah Amin and Raina Amin, identical twins in the ABC thriller series Quantico.

== Early life ==
Yasmine Al Massari was born in 1978 in Beirut, Lebanon to a Palestinian refugee father and an Egyptian mother. She was initially raised during the Lebanese Civil War until her parents fled and moved to France. In 2007 she graduated from the École Nationale supérieure des Beaux-Arts in Paris and began her career as a dancer at the Souraya Baghdadi dance company. She later moved to the US.

== Career ==
Massri made her big screen début in the 2007 critically acclaimed Lebanese LGBTQ-themed comedy-drama film, Caramel, directed by Nadine Labaki. The film was presented at the 2007 Cannes Film Festival, For Caramel she received the Best Actress Award at the 2007 Abu Dhabi Film Festival, and the same year a Best Actress nomination at the Asia Pacific Screen Awards. Following Caramel, she starred in the internationally produced films Al-mor wa al rumman, Al Juma Al Akheira, and Miral.

In 2014, Massri made her debut on American television, in a starring role on the NBC drama series, Crossbones opposite John Malkovich. In 2015, she was cast alongside Priyanka Chopra and Aunjanue Ellis in the ABC thriller Quantico as two characters — identical twins Nimah and Raina Amin.

In May 2016, Massri became a citizen of the United States.

== Filmography ==
Year	Title	Role	Notes
2007	Caramel	Nisrine	Nominated — Asia Pacific Screen Award for Best Performance by an Actress
2008	Al-mor wa al rumman	Kamar	
2010	Miral	Nadia	
2011	Al Juma Al Akheira	Dalal	
2014	Crossbones	Selima El Sharad	Series regular, 9 episodes
2015–2017	Quantico	Nimah & Raina Amin	Series regular, 44 episodes
2018	Law & Order: Special Victims Unit	Tara	Episode: "Flight Risk"
2020–2021	Castlevania	Morana	Voice, 7 episodes
2020	Refugee	Amira	Short film
2022	Salvation Has No Name	Woman	Short film
2024	The Strangers' Case	Amira	
2025	Palestine 36	Khuloud Atef	
2026	Marble Hall Murders	Leila Crace / Lola	Upcoming six-part series
