= Money Heist =

Spanish heist crime drama television series

- Spanish: La casa de papel
- Genre: Heist; Crime drama; Thriller
- Created by: Álex Pina
- Starring: Úrsula Corberó; Álvaro Morte; Itziar Ituño; Pedro Alonso; Paco Tous; Alba Flores; Miguel Herrán; Jaime Lorente; Esther Acebo; Enrique Arce; Darko Perić; Kiti Mánver; Hovik Keuchkerian; Luka Peroš; Belén Cuesta; Fernando Cayo; Rodrigo de la Serna; Najwa Nimri; María Pedraza
- Theme music composer: Manel Santisteban
- Opening theme: "My Life Is Going On" by Cecilia Krull
- Composers: Manel Santisteban; Iván Martínez Lacámara
- Country of origin: Spain
- Original language: Spanish
- No. of seasons: 3 (5 parts) (Note: Some publications refer to "part" as "season.")
- No. of episodes: 41 (list of episodes)

Production
- Executive producers: Álex Pina; Sonia Martínez; Jesús Colmenar; Esther Martínez Lobato; Nacho Manubens
- Production locations: Spain; Italy; Thailand; Panama; Denmark; Portugal
- Cinematography: Migue Amoedo
- Editors: David Pelegrín; Luis Miguel González Bedmar; Verónica Callón; Raúl Mora; Regino Hernández; Raquel Marraco; Patricia Rubio
- Camera setup: Single-camera
- Running time: 67–77 minutes (Antena 3); 42–76 minutes (Netflix)
- Production companies: Atresmedia; Vancouver Media

Original release
- Network: Antena 3
- Release: 2 May – 23 November 2017
- Network: Netflix
- Release: 19 July 2019 – 3 December 2021

Related
- Money Heist: Korea – Joint Economic Area; Berlin

Money Heist (Spanish: La casa de papel, [la ˈkasa ðe paˈpel], lit. 'The House of Paper') is a Spanish heist crime drama television series created by Álex Pina. The series traces two long-prepared heists led by the Professor (Álvaro Morte), one on the Royal Mint of Spain, and one on the Bank of Spain, told from the perspective of one of the robbers, Tokyo (Úrsula Corberó). The story is told in a real-time-like fashion and relies on an unreliable narrator, flashbacks, time-jumps, and hidden character motivations for complexity.

The series was initially intended as a two-part limited series. It had its original run of 15 episodes on Spanish network Antena 3 from 2 May 2017 through 23 November 2017. Netflix acquired global streaming rights in late 2017. It re-cut the series into 22 shorter episodes and released them worldwide, beginning with the first part on 20 December 2017, followed by the second part on 6 April 2018. In April 2018, Netflix renewed the series with a significantly increased budget for 16 new episodes total. Part 3, with eight episodes, was released on 19 July 2019. Part 4, also with eight episodes, was released on 3 April 2020. A documentary involving the producers and the cast premiered on Netflix the same day, titled Money Heist: The Phenomenon (Spanish: La casa de papel: El Fenómeno). In July 2020, Netflix renewed the show for a fifth and final part, which was released in two five-episode volumes, on 3 September and 3 December 2021, respectively.

Similar to Money Heist: The Phenomenon, a two-part documentary involving the producers and cast premiered on Netflix the same day, titled Money Heist: From Tokyo to Berlin. The series was filmed in Madrid, Spain. Significant portions were also filmed in Panama, Thailand, Italy (Florence), Denmark and in Portugal (Lisbon). A South Korean remake set in an alternate universe, Money Heist: Korea – Joint Economic Area, was released in two parts on 24 June and 9 December 2022 respectively, while a direct spin-off, Berlin, with Pedro Alonso, Itziar Ituño, and Najwa Nimri reprising their roles, was released on 29 December 2023, forming a shared universe.

The series received several awards including the International Emmy Award for Best Drama Series at the 46th International Emmy Awards, as well as critical acclaim for its sophisticated plot, interpersonal dramas, direction, and for trying to innovate Spanish television. The Italian anti-fascist song "Bella ciao", which plays multiple times throughout the series, became a summer hit across Europe in 2018. By that year, the series was the most-watched non-English-language series and one of the most-watched series overall on Netflix, having particular resonance with viewers from Mediterranean Europe and the Latin American regions.

== Premise ==
Set in Madrid, a mysterious man known as the "Professor" recruits a group of eight people, who choose city names as their aliases for anonymity, to carry out an ambitious plan that involves entering the Royal Mint of Spain, and escaping with €984 million. After taking 67 people hostage inside the Mint, the team plans to remain inside for 11 days to print the money as they deal with elite police forces. In the events following the initial heist, the group members are forced out of hiding and prepare for a second heist, with some additional members, this time aiming to escape with gold from the Bank of Spain and rescuing an old friend and member of the heist, as they again deal with hostages and police forces.

== Cast and characters ==
=== Main ===
Role	Portrayed by	
Silene Oliveira (Tokyo)	Úrsula Corberó	A runaway turned robber who is scouted by the Professor, then joins his group and participates in his plans. She also acts as the narrator.
Sergio Marquina (The Professor) / Salvador "Salva" Martín	Álvaro Morte	The mastermind of the heist who assembled the group, and Berlin's younger brother
Raquel Murillo (Lisbon)	Itziar Ituño	An inspector of the National Police Corps who is put in charge of the case
Andrés de Fonollosa (Berlin)	Pedro Alonso	A terminally ill jewel thief and the Professor's second-in-command and older brother
Agustín Ramos (Moscow)	Paco Tous	(parts 1–2; featured parts 3–5): a former miner turned criminal and Denver's father
Ágata Jiménez (Nairobi)	Alba Flores	An expert in counterfeiting and forgery, in charge of printing the money and oversaw the melting of gold
Aníbal Cortés (Rio)	Miguel Herrán	A young hacker who later becomes Tokyo's boyfriend
Ricardo / Daniel Ramos (Denver)	Jaime Lorente	Moscow's son who joins him in the heist
Mónica Gaztambide (Stockholm)	Esther Acebo	One of the hostages in the Mint who is Arturo Román's secretary and mistress, carrying his child out of wedlock; during the robbery, she falls in love with Denver and becomes an accomplice to the group
Arturo Román	Enrique Arce	A hostage and the former Director of the Royal Mint of Spain
Alison Parker	María Pedraza	(parts 1–2): a hostage in the Mint and daughter of the British ambassador to Spain
Mirko Dragic (Helsinki)	Darko Perić	a Serbian army veteran and Oslo's cousin
Mariví Fuentes	Kiti Mánver	(parts 1–2; featured parts 3–4): Raquel's mother
Santiago Lopez (Bogotá)	Hovik Keuchkerian	an expert in metallurgy who joins the robbery of the Bank of Spain
Jakov (Marseille)	Luka Peroš	(parts 4–5; featured part 3): a member of the gang who joins the robbery of the Bank of Spain and serves as a liaison for the group.
Julia Martinez (formerly Juan) (Manila)	Belén Cuesta	(parts 4–5; featured part 3): godchild of Moscow and Denver's childhood friend, a trans woman, who joins the gang and poses as one of the hostages during the robbery of the Bank of Spain
Colonel Luis Tamayo	Fernando Cayo	(part 4–5; featured part 3): a member of the Spanish Intelligence who oversees Alicia's work on the case
Martín Berrote (Palermo / The Engineer)	Rodrigo de la Serna	(parts 3–5): an old Argentine friend of Berlin who planned the robbery of the Bank of Spain with him and assumed his place as commanding officer
Alicia Sierra	Najwa Nimri	(parts 3–5): a pregnant inspector of the National Police Corps put in charge of the case after Raquel departed from the force

=== Recurring ===
- Roberto García Ruiz as Dimitri Mostovói / Radko Dragić (Oslo; parts 1–2; featured parts 3–4): a veteran Serbian soldier and Helsinki's cousin
- Fernando Soto as Ángel Rubio (parts 1–2; featured parts 3–5): a deputy inspector and Raquel's second-in-command
- Juan Fernández as Colonel Alfonso Prieto (parts 1–2; featured parts 3–4): a member of the Spanish Intelligence who oversees Raquel's work on the case
- Anna Gras as Mercedes Colmenar (parts 1–2): Alison's teacher and one of the hostages in the Mint
- Fran Morcillo as Pablo Ruiz (part 1): Alison's schoolmate and one of the hostages in the Mint
- Clara Alvarado as Ariadna Cascales (parts 1–2): one of the hostages who works in the Mint and seduces Berlin
- Mario de la Rosa as Suárez: the chief of the Grupo Especial de Operaciones
- Miquel García Borda as Alberto Vicuña (parts 1–2; featured parts 4-5): Raquel's ex-husband and a forensic examiner
- Naia Guz as Paula Vicuña Murillo (parts 1–2; featured parts 3–4): Raquel and Alberto's daughter
- José Manuel Poga as César Gandía (parts 4–5; featured part 3): chief of security for the Bank of Spain who escapes from hostage and causes havoc for the group
- Antonio Romero as Benito Antoñanzas (parts 3–5): an assistant to Colonel Luis Tamayo, who is persuaded by the Professor to do tasks for him
- Diana Gómez as Tatiana (featured parts 3–5): the fifth ex-wife of Berlin who is a professional pianist and thief
- Pep Munné as Mario Urbaneja (featured parts 3–5): the governor of the Bank of Spain
- Olalla Hernández as Amanda (featured parts 3–5): the Secretary to the governor of the Bank of Spain and hostage who Arturo rapes
- Mari Carmen Sánchez as Paquita (featured parts 3–5): a hostage in the Bank of Spain and a nurse who tends to Nairobi while she recovers
- Carlos Suárez as Miguel Fernández (featured parts 3–5): a nervous hostage in the Bank of Spain
- Ahikar Azcona as Matías Caño (Pamplona; featured parts 3–5): a member of the group who largely guards the hostages in the Bank of Spain
- Ramón Agirre as Benjamín Martinez (Logroño; featured parts 4–5): father of Manila who aids the Professor in his plan
- Antonio García Ferreras as himself (featured parts 4–5): a journalist
- José Manuel Seda as Sagasta (part 5): leader of the army detail inside the bank
- Patrick Criado as Rafael (featured part 5): Berlin's son and Professor's nephew
- Miguel Ángel Silvestre (featured part 5): René, Tokyo's boyfriend before working with the Professor
- Alberto Amarilla as Ramiro (part 5): member of Sagasta's Special Forces
- Jennifer Miranda as Arteche (part 5): member of Sagasta's Special Forces
- Ajay Jethi as Shakir (featured parts 4–5): the lead Pakistani hacker that was hired by the Professor during the Bank of Spain robbery

== Production ==
=== Conception and writing ===
We wanted to make a very small project in a simple way; we wanted to cross lines we couldn't cross in previous projects, in terms of narrative and structure without any intermediaries.

— Writer Esther Martinez Lobato, October 2018

The series was conceived by screenwriter Álex Pina and director Jesús Colmenar during their years of collaboration since 2008. After finishing their work on the Spanish prison drama Locked Up (Vis a vis), they left Globomedia to set up their own production company, named Vancouver Media, in 2016. For their first project, they considered either filming a comedy or developing a heist story for television, with the latter having never been attempted before on Spanish television. Along with former Locked Up colleagues, (Note: Locked Up and Money Heist share Álex Pina, Esther Martínez Lobato, Pablo Roa, and Esther Morales as writers; and Jesús Colmenar and Alex Rodrigo as directors.) they developed Money Heist as a passion project to try new things without outside interference. Pina was firm about making it a limited series, feeling that dilution had become a problem for his previous productions.

Initially entitled Los Desahuciados (The Evicted) in the conception phase, the series was developed to subvert heist conventions and combine elements of the action genre, thrillers and surrealism, while still being credible. Pina saw an advantage over typical heist films in that character development could span a considerably longer narrative story arc. Characters were to be shown from multiple sides to break the viewers' preconceptions of villainy and retain their interest throughout the show. Key aspects of the planned storyline were written down at the beginning, while the finer story beats were developed incrementally to not overwhelm the writers. Writer Javier Gómez Santander compared the writing process to the Professor's way of thinking, "going around, writing down options, consulting engineers whom you cannot tell why you ask them that," but noted that fiction allowed the police to be written dumber when necessary.

The beginning of filming was set for January 2017, allowing for five months of pre-production. The narrative was split into two parts for financial considerations. The robbers' city-based code names, which Spanish newspaper ABC compared to the colour-based code names in Quentin Tarantino's 1992 heist film Reservoir Dogs, were chosen at random in the first part, although places with high viewership resonance were also taken into account for the new robbers' code names in part 3. The first five lines of the pilot script took a month to write, as the writers were unable to make the Professor or Moscow work as the narrator. Ultimately, Tokyo was chosen as the narrator. Flashbacks and time-jumps increased the narrative complexity and made the story more fluid for the audience. The pilot episode required over 50 script versions until the producers were satisfied. Later scripts would be finished once per week to keep up with filming.

=== Casting ===
Casting took place late in February 2016, spanning more than two months. The characters were not fully fleshed out at the beginning of this process, and took shape based on the actors' performances. Casting directors Eva Leira and Yolanda Serrano were looking for actors with the ability to play empathetic robbers with believable love and family connections. Antena 3 announced the ensemble cast in March 2017 and released audition excerpts of most cast actors in the series' aftershow Tercer Grado and on their website.

The Professor was designed as a charismatic yet shy villain who could convince the robbers to follow him and make the audience sympathetic to the robbers' resistance against the powerful banks. However, developing the Professor's role proved difficult, as the character did not follow archetypal conventions and the producers were uncertain about his degree of brilliance. While the producers found his Salva personality early on, they were originally looking for a 50-year-old Harvard professor type with the looks of Spanish actor José Coronado. The role was proposed to Javier Gutiérrez, but he was already committed to starring in the film Campeones. Meanwhile, the casting directors advocated for Álvaro Morte, whom they knew from their collaboration on the long-running Spanish soap opera El secreto de Puente Viejo, even though his prime-time television experience was limited at that point. Going through the full casting process and approaching the role through external analysis rather than personal experience, Morte described the professor as "a tremendous box of surprises" that "end up shaping this character because he never ceases to generate uncertainty," making it unclear for the audience if the character is good or bad. The producers also found that his appearance of a primary school teacher gave the character more credibility.

Pedro Alonso was cast to play Berlin, whom La Voz de Galicia would later characterize as a "cold, hypnotic, sophisticated and disturbing character, an inveterate macho with serious empathy problems, a white-collar thief who despises his colleagues and considers them inferior." The actor's portrayal of the character was inspired by a chance encounter Alonso had the day before receiving his audition script, with "an intelligent person" who was "provocative or even manipulative" to him. Alonso saw high observation skills and an unusual understanding of his surroundings in Berlin, resulting in unconventional and unpredictable character behaviour. Similarities between Berlin and Najwa Nimri's character Zulema in Pina's TV series Locked Up were unintentional. The family connection between the Professor and Berlin was not in the original script, but was built into the characters' backstory at the end of part 1 after Morte and Alonso had repeatedly proposed to do so.

The producers found the protagonist and narrator, Tokyo, among the hardest characters to develop, as they were originally looking for an older actress to play the character who had nothing to lose before meeting the Professor. Úrsula Corberó eventually landed the role for bringing a playful energy to the table; her voice was heavily factored in during casting, as she was the first voice the audience hears in the show. Jaime Lorente developed Denver's hallmark laughter during the casting process. Two cast actors had appeared in previous TV series by Álex Pina: Paco Tous (Moscow) had starred in the 2005 TV series Los hombres de Paco, and Alba Flores (Nairobi) had starred in Locked Up. Flores was asked to play Nairobi without audition when Pina realised late in the conception phase that the show needed another female gang member. For the role opposite to the robbers, Itziar Ituño was cast to play Inspector Raquel Murillo, whom Ituño described as a "strong and powerful woman in a world of men, but also sensitive in her private life". She took inspiration from The Silence of the Lambs character Clarice Starling, an FBI student with a messy family life who develops sympathies for a criminal.

The actors learned of the show's renewal by Netflix before the producers contacted them to return. In October 2018, Netflix announced the cast of part 3; the returning main cast included Pedro Alonso, raising speculation about his role in part 3. Among the new cast members were Argentine actor Rodrigo de la Serna, who saw a possible connection between his character's name and the Argentine football legend Martín Palermo, and Locked Up star Najwa Nimri. Cameo appearance scenes of Brazilian football star, and fan of the series, Neymar, as a monk were filmed for part 3, but were excluded from the stream without repercussions to the narrative until judicial charges against him had been dropped in late August 2019. A small appearance by Spanish actress Belén Cuesta in two episodes of part 3 raised fan and media speculation about her role in part 4.

=== Design ===
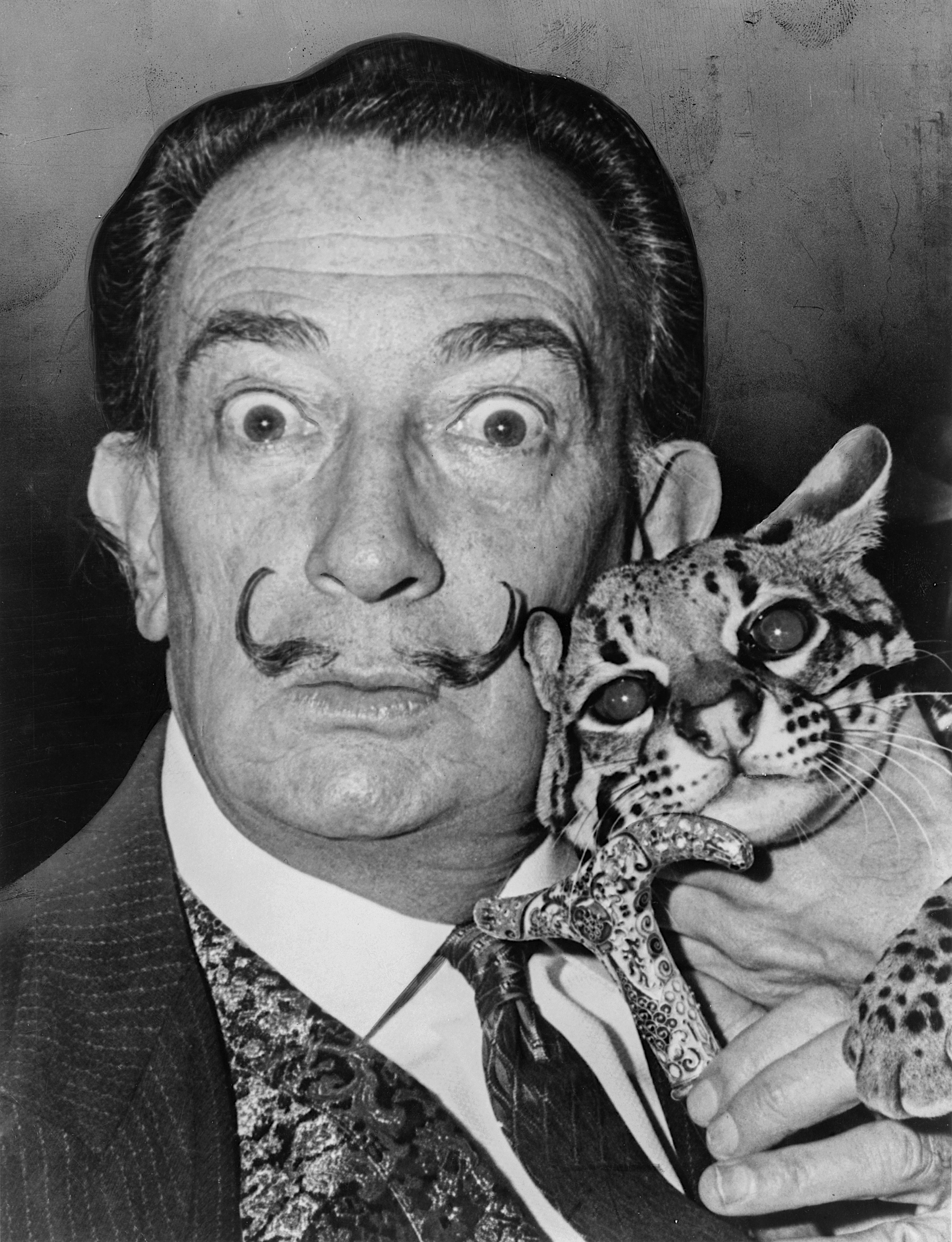
Spanish Surrealist painter Salvador Dalí was chosen as the heist team's mask design.

The show's look and atmosphere were developed by creator Álex Pina, director Jesús Colmenar, and director of photography Migue Amoedo, according to La Vanguardia "the most prolific television trio in recent years". Abdón Alcañiz served as art director. Their collaboration projects usually take a primary colour as a basis; Money Heist had red as "one of the distinguishing features of the series" that stood over the gray sets. Blue, green and yellow were marked as a forbidden colour in production design. To achieve "absolute film quality", red tones were tested with different types of fabrics, textures and lighting. The iconography of the robbers' red jumpsuits mirrored the yellow prison dress code in Locked Up. For part 3, the Italian retail clothing company Diesel modified the red jumpsuits to better fit the body and launched a clothing line inspired by the series. Salvador Dalí was chosen as the robbers' mask design because of Dalí's recognisable visage that also serves as an iconic cultural reference to Spain; Don Quixote as an alternative mask design was discarded. This choice sparked criticism by the Gala-Salvador Dalí Foundation for not requesting the necessary permissions.

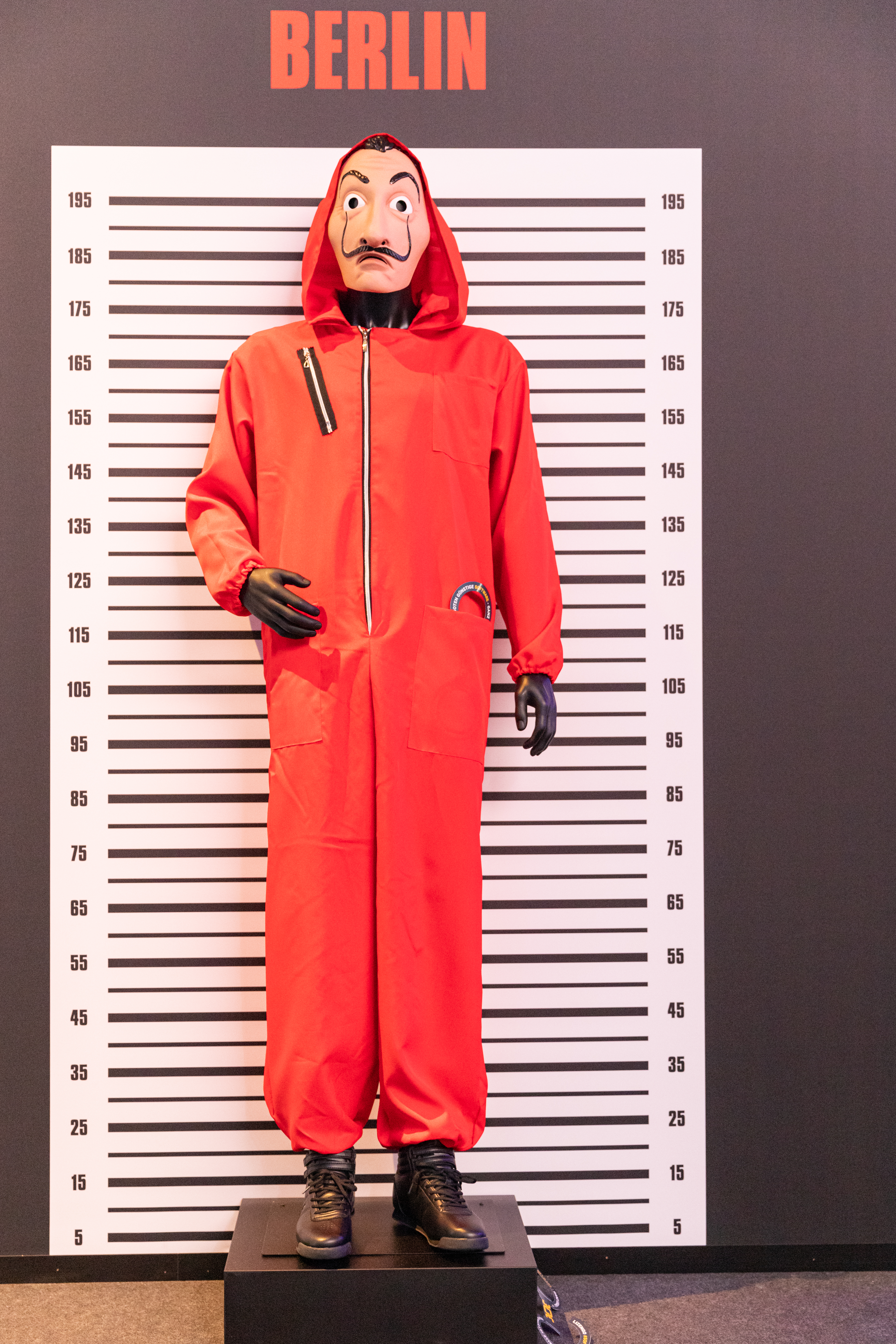
The Robbers outfits featuring the Salvador Dalí mask

To make the plot more realistic, the producers requested and received advice from the national police, civil guard, and the Spanish Ministry of Interior. The robbers' banknotes were printed with permission of the Bank of Spain and had an increased size as an anti-counterfeit measure. The greater financial backing of Netflix for part 3 allowed for the build of over 50 sets across five basic filming locations world-wide. Preparing a remote and uninhabited island in Panama to represent a robber hide-out proved difficult, as it needed to be cleaned, secured and built on, and involved hours-long travelling with material transportation. The real Bank of Spain was unavailable for visiting and filming for security reasons, so the producers recreated the Bank on a two-level stage by their own imagining, taking inspiration from Spanish architecture of the Francisco Franco era. Publicly available information was used to make the Bank's main hall set similar to the real location. The other interior sets were inspired by different periods and artificially aged to accentuate the building's history. Bronze and granite sculptures and motifs from the Valle de los Caídos were recreated for the interior, and over 50 paintings were painted for the Bank to emulate the Ateneo de Madrid.

=== Filming ===
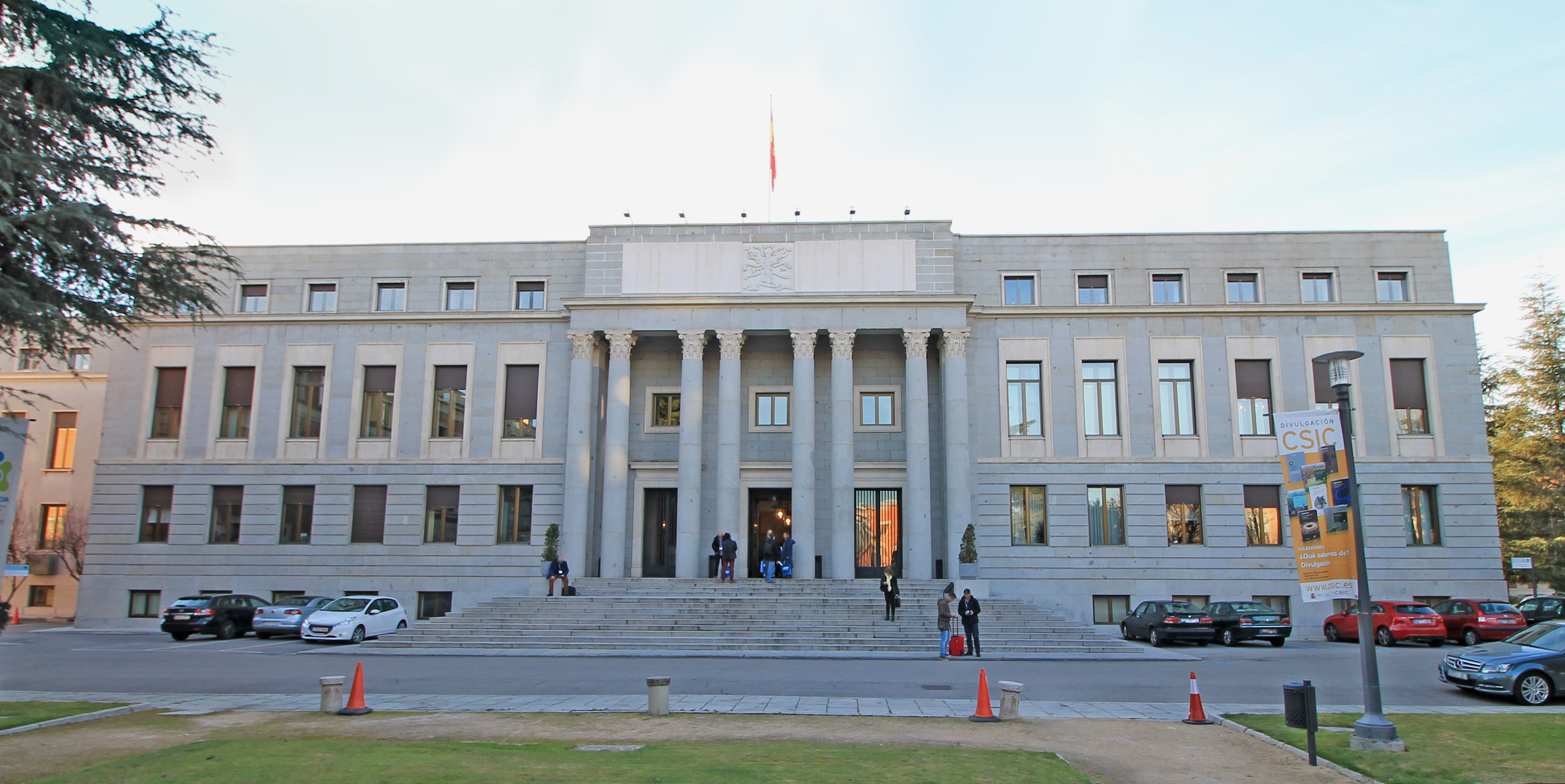
The Spanish National Research Council headquarters, the principal filming location of part 1 and 2 of Money Heist

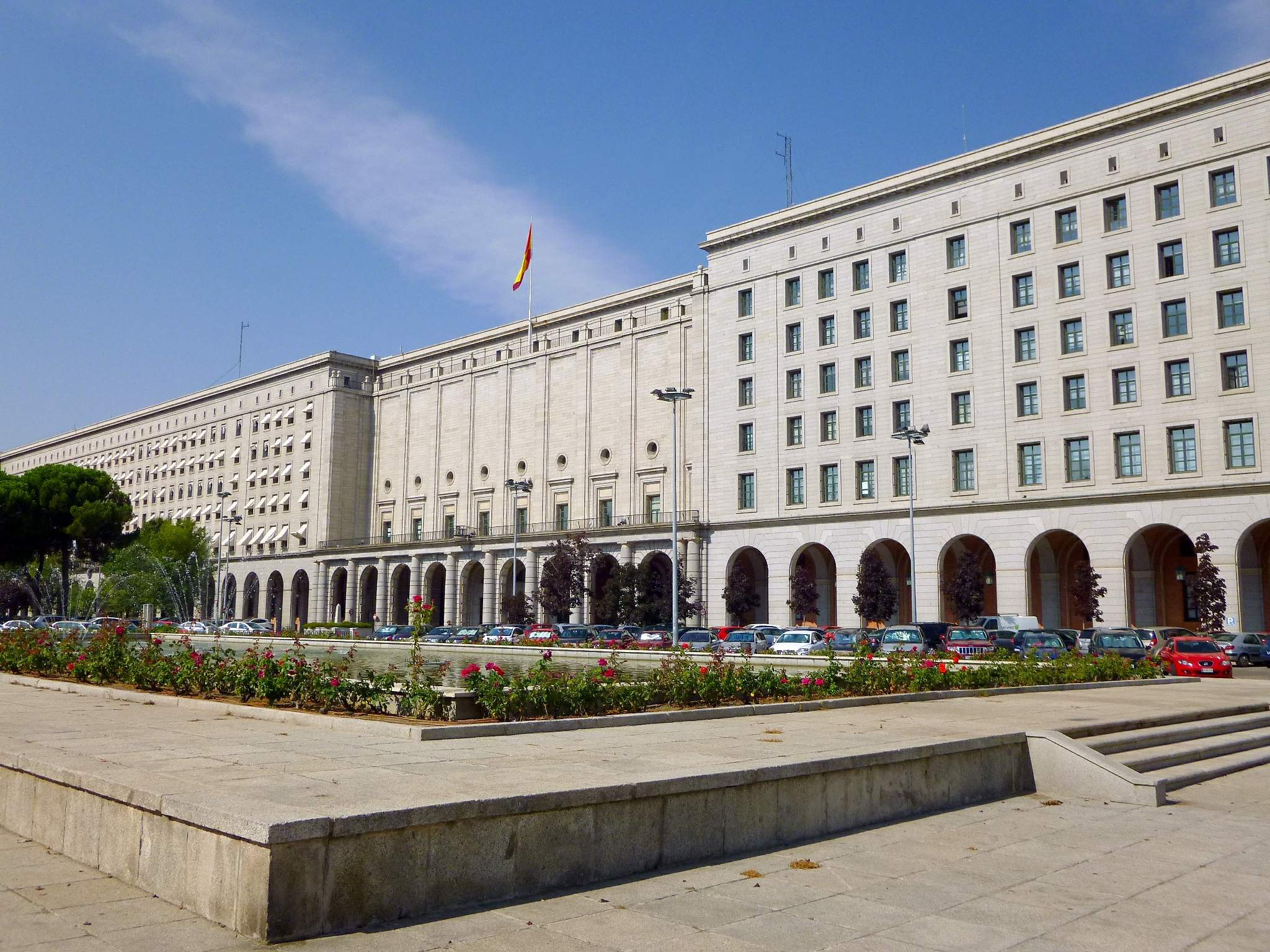
The Nuevos Ministerios, the principal filming location of part 3 to 5 of Money Heist

Parts 1 and 2 were filmed back-to-back in the greater Madrid region from January until August 2017. The pilot episode was recorded in 26 days, while all other episodes had around 14 filming days. Production was split into two units to save time, with one unit shooting scenes involving the Professor and the police, and the other filming scenes with the robbers. The main storyline is set in the Royal Mint of Spain in Madrid, but the exterior scenes were filmed at the Spanish National Research Council (CSIC) headquarters for its passing resemblance to the Mint, and on the roof of the Higher Technical School of Aeronautical Engineers, part of the Technical University of Madrid. The hunting estate where the robbers plan their coup was filmed at the Finca El Gasco farm estate in Torrelodones. Interior filming took place at the former Locked Up sets in Colmenar Viejo and at the Spanish national daily newspaper ABC in Torrejón de Ardoz for printing press scenes. As the show was designed as a limited series, all sets were destroyed once production of part 2 had finished.

Parts 3 and 4 were also filmed back-to-back, with 21 to 23 filming days per episode. Netflix announced the start of filming on 25 October 2018, and filming of part 4 ended in August 2019. In 2018, Netflix had opened its first European production hub in Tres Cantos near Madrid for new and existing Netflix productions; main filming moved there onto a set three times the size of the set used for parts 1 and 2. The main storyline is set in the Bank of Spain in Madrid, but the exterior was filmed at the Ministry of Development complex Nuevos Ministerios. A scene where money is dropped from the sky was filmed at Callao Square. Ermita de San Frutos in Carrascal del Río served as the exterior of the Italian monastery where the robbers plan the heist. The motorhome scenes of the Professor and Lisbon were filmed at the deserted Las Salinas beaches in Almería to make the audience feel that the characters are safe from the police although their exact location is undisclosed at first. Underwater scenes inside the vault were filmed at Pinewood Studios in the United Kingdom. The beginning of part 3 was also filmed in Thailand, on the Guna Yala islands in Panama, and in Florence, Italy, which helped to counter the claustrophobic feeling of the first two parts, but was also an expression of the plot's global repercussions. Filming for the fifth and final season concluded on 14 May 2021.

=== Music ===
The series' theme song, "My Life Is Going On", was composed by Manel Santisteban, who also served as composer on Locked Up. Santisteban approached Spanish singer, Cecilia Krull, to write and perform the lyrics, which are about having confidence in one's abilities and the future. The theme song is played behind a title sequence featuring paper models of major settings from the series. Krull's main source of inspiration was the character Tokyo in the first episode of the series, when the Professor offers her a way out of a desperate moment. The lyrics are in English as the language that came naturally to Krull at the time of writing.

The Italian anti-fascist song "Bella ciao" plays multiple times throughout the series and accompanies two emblematic key scenes: at the end of the first part the Professor and Berlin sing it in preparation for the heist, embracing themselves as resistance against the establishment, and in the second part it plays during the thieves' escape from the Mint, as a metaphor for freedom. Regarding the use of the song, Tokyo recounts in one of her narrations, "The life of the Professor revolved around a single idea: Resistance. His grandfather, who had fought against the fascists in Italy, taught him the song, and he taught us." The song was brought to the show by writer Javier Gómez Santander. He had listened to "Bella ciao" at home to cheer him up, as he had grown frustrated for not finding a suitable song for the middle of part 1. He was aware of the song's meaning and history and felt it represented positive values. "Bella ciao" became a summer hit in Europe in 2018, mostly due to the popularity of the series and not the song's grave themes.

== Episodes ==
Overview of Money Heist seasons
Part	Season	Episodes		Originally released		
Part	Season	Episodes		First released	Last released	Network
1	1	9 (Note: Part 1 was re-cut and released as 13 episodes on 20 December 2017 on Netflix, and Part 2 was re-cut and released as 9 episodes on 6 April 2018 on Netflix. See Money Heist § Netflix acquisition.)		2 May 2017	27 June 2017	Antena 3
2	1	6		16 October 2017	23 November 2017	Antena 3
3	2	8		19 July 2019		Netflix
4	2	8		3 April 2020		Netflix
5	3	10	5	3 September 2021		Netflix
5	3	10	5	3 December 2021		Netflix

=== Season 1: Parts 1 and 2 (2017) ===
Part 1 begins with the aftermath of a failed bank robbery by a woman using the alias "Tokyo" as a man called the "Professor" saves her from being caught by the police. He proposes to include her in a heist of massive proportions. After a brief outline of the plan, the story jumps to the beginning of a multi-day assault on the Royal Mint of Spain in Madrid. The eight robbers are code-named for cities: Tokyo, Moscow, Berlin, Nairobi, Rio, Denver, Helsinki, and Oslo. Dressed in red jumpsuits and masks depicting artist Salvador Dalí, the robbers take 67 hostages as part of their plan to print and escape with €2.4 billion through a self-built escape tunnel. The Professor heads the heist from an external location. Flashbacks throughout the series show the five months of preparation at an abandoned hunting estate in the Toledo countryside; the robbers are not to share personal information nor engage in personal relationships, and are warned that there will be casualties.

Throughout parts 1 and 2, the robbers inside the Mint have difficulties sticking to their roles and face uncooperative hostages, violence, isolation, and mutiny. Tokyo narrates events through voice-overs. While Denver pursues a love affair with hostage Mónica Gaztambide, inspector Raquel Murillo of the National Police Corps negotiates with the Professor on the outside and begins an intimate relationship with his alter ego "Salva." The Professor's identity is repeatedly close to being uncovered and Raquel eventually realizes Salva is the Professor, but she is emotionally unable to hand him over to the police. At the end of part 2, after 128 hours, the robbers escape from the Mint with €984 million, but Oslo, Moscow and Berlin are killed. One year after the heist, Raquel finds a series of postcards left by the Professor, who wrote the coordinates for a location in Palawan in the Philippines, where she reunites with him and the story comes to a conclusion.

=== Season 2: Parts 3 and 4 (2019–2020) ===
Part 3 begins three years after the heist on the Royal Mint of Spain, and restarts the story showing the robbers enjoying their lives paired-up in diverse locations. However, when Europol captures Rio with an intercepted phone, the Professor picks up Berlin's old plans to assault the Bank of Spain to force Europol to hand over Rio to prevent his torture. He and Raquel (going by "Lisbon") get the gang, including Mónica (going by "Stockholm"), back together, and enlist three new members: Palermo, Bogotá and Marseille, with Palermo in charge. Flashbacks to the Professor and Berlin outline the planned new heist and their different approaches to love. The disguised robbers sneak into the heavily guarded bank, take hostages and eventually gain access to the gold and state secrets. At the same time, the Professor and Lisbon travel in an RV and then an ambulance while communicating with the robbers and the police. The robbers thwart a police breach of the bank, forcing the police, led by Colonel Luis Tamayo and pregnant inspector Alicia Sierra, to release Rio to the robbers. Nairobi is injured by a police sniper's shot to the chest. With another police assault on the bank coming, and believing Lisbon has been executed by the police, the Professor radios Palermo and declares DEFCON 2. The robbers respond by firing a rocket at the armored police vehicle that is advancing on the bank, turning the robbers from folk heroes to killers in the eyes of the public. Part 3 concludes by showing Lisbon alive and in custody, and Tokyo narrating that the Professor had fallen for a trap. She concludes that because of the Professor's miscalculation, "the war had begun."

Part 4 begins with the robbers rushing to save Nairobi's life. While Tokyo stages a coup d'état and takes over command from Palermo, the Professor and Marseille deduce that Lisbon must still be alive and being interrogated by Sierra in the police command post tent outside the bank. They persuade Tamayo's assistant, Antoñanzas, to help them so the Professor can establish a 48-hour truce with the police. As the group manages to save Nairobi's life, the restrained Palermo attempts to reassert command by colluding with Gandía, the restrained chief of security for the Bank of Spain. Gandía escapes, begins communications with the police from within a panic room inside the bank, and participates in a violent cat-and-mouse game with the gang. Palermo reverses course, regains the trust of the group, and rejoins them. Gandía shoots Nairobi in the head, killing her instantly, but the gang later recapture him. As the police prepare another assault on the bank, the Professor exposes to the public the unlawful torture of Rio and Lisbon's detention and interrogation. Sierra is fired and begins pursuing the Professor on her own. The Professor enlists external help to free Lisbon after she is transferred from the command post tent to the Supreme Court building. Part 4 concludes with Lisbon rejoining the gang inside the bank, and with Sierra finding the Professor's hideout, then holding him at gunpoint.

=== Season 3: Part 5 Volumes 1 and 2 (2021) ===
Part 5 Volume 1 begins with Sierra finding the Professor and knocking him out, then tying him up and interrogating him. After Lisbon enters the bank, the gang prepares for an attack by troops of the Spanish army. The gang captures Gandia, then frees him rather than killing him. Gandia wants to exact revenge on the gang, so Tamayo has him join the assault by the soldiers. After finding out the Professor has been caught but that Sierra has not notified the police, Lisbon tells the gang they will not give up. Benjamin and Marseille find the Professor, and Sierra knocks them out and ties them up. When Sierra struggles to deliver her baby, she frees the Professor, Marseille, and Benjamin so they can help. Sierra gives birth to a daughter, whom she names Victoria. Arturo Roman, a hostage in both the Royal Mint and the Bank of Spain, had an affair with Stockholm before the first heist, and Arturo's reminders anger Denver. When Arturo, the governor of the bank, and other hostages start a rebellion, Stockholm shoots Arturo, who is released so he can receive medical care. In a flashback, Berlin convinces his son Rafael to help him steal 12 kilograms of gold with Tatiana, Bogota, and Marseille. In the present, the gang starts fighting the soldiers, with Helsinki sustaining a severe injury. Stockholm feels guilt over shooting Arturo, who is her son's birth father, and takes morphine while nursing Helsinki, which leaves her unable to aid in the gang's defense against the attacking soldiers. Part 5 Volume 1 concludes with Tokyo sacrificing herself to defeat Gandia and the soldiers.

In Part 5 Volume 2, Sierra runs away and the Professor and Marseille chase after her. Initially enemies, the Professor and Sierra soon become allies as they face their common enemy – the police. When they go back to the stormwater tank, they see the gold has already been delivered to them by the gang. However, the police find the stormwater tank and arrests the Professor, Sierra, Benjamin and Marseille. They escape, but find the gold missing. It is revealed that the gold is stolen by Rafael and Tatiana because she broke up with Berlin in the past to be with Rafael. In the present, Tatiana and Rafael bury the gold. Palermo and the Professor discover that it is their doing, but at this time, the army captured the gang. The Professor gives Sierra a note for Rafael, and convinces her to find the gold as that is their only hope while he drives to the bank. When he enters the bank, Tamayo taunts him and interrogates each gang member separately. Denver goes first, but does not reveal anything and is escorted to the police tent. The gang reveals to the public the gold has already been removed from the bank, leading to public panic and an economic meltdown, putting Spain in danger of bankruptcy. Sierra is able to locate the stolen gold. Outside the bank, the gold has arrived in trucks, but the Professor says it is gold-coated brass. The gang members are killed on Tamayo's orders, shocking Denver in the tent. They are taken out of the bank in body bags, and it is revealed they are alive as the Professor convinced Tamayo to stop the chase; the return of the "gold" has stabilized the country's economy. 24 hours after the heist, the gang reunite at an air base. Everyone receives new passports as Rafael and Tatiana return the gold to the gang with a promise that they will receive a share. The gang leaves the air base, having successfully robbed the Bank of Spain.

== Themes and analysis ==
The series was noted for its subversions of the heist genre. While heist films are usually told with a rational male Anglo-centric focus, the series reframes the heist story by giving it a strong Spanish identity and telling it from a female perspective through Tokyo. The producers regarded the cultural identity as an important part of the personality of the series, as it made the story more relatable for viewers. They also avoided adapting the series to international tastes, which helped to set it apart from the usual American TV series and raised international awareness of Spanish sensibilities. Emotional dynamics like the passion and impulsivity of friendship and love offset the perfect strategic crime for increased tension. Nearly all main characters, including the relationship-opposing Professor, eventually succumb to love, for which the series received comparisons to telenovelas. Comedic elements, which were compared to Back to the Future and black comedy, also offset the heist tension. The heist film formula is subverted by the heist starting straight after the opening credits instead of lingering on how the gang is brought together.

With the series being set after the 2008 financial crisis, which resulted in severe austerity measures in Spain, critics argued that the series was an explicit allegory of rebellion against capitalism, including The Globe and Mail, who saw the series as "subversive in that it's about a heist for the people. It's revenge against a government." According to Le Monde, the Professor's teaching scenes in the Toledo hunting estate, in particular, highlighted how people should seek to develop their own solutions for the fallible capitalist system. The show's Robin Hood analogy of robbing the rich and giving to the poor received various interpretations. El Español argued that the analogy made it easier for viewers to connect with the show, as modern society tended to be tired of banks and politics already, and the New Statesman said the rich were no longer stolen from but undermined at their roots. On the other hand, Esquire's Mireia Mullor saw the Robin Hood analogy as a mere distraction strategy for the robbers, as they initially did not plan to use the money from their first heist to improve the quality of life of regular people; for this reason, Mullor also argues that the large following for the robbers in part 3 was not understandable even though they represented a channel for the discontent of those bearing economic and political injustices.

The characters were designed as multi-dimensional and complementary antagonists and antiheroes whose moralities are ever-changing. Examples include Berlin, who shifts from a robber mistreating hostages, to one of the series' most beloved characters. There is also the hostage Mónica Gaztambide, as well as inspector Raquel Murillo, who eventually join the cause of the robbers. Gonzálvez of The Huffington Post finds that an audience may think of the robbers as evil at first for committing a crime, but as the series progresses it marks the financial system as the true evil and suggests the robbers have ethical and empathetic justification for stealing from an overpowered thief. Najwa Nimri, playing inspector Sierra in part 3, said that "the complex thing about a villain is giving him humanity. That's where everyone gets alarmed when you have to prove that a villain also has a heart". She added that the amount of information and technology that surrounds us is allowing us to verify that "everyone has a dark side." The series leaves it to the audience to decide who is good or bad, as characters are "relatable and immoral" at various points in the story. Pina argued that it was this ability to change the view that made the series addictive and marked its success.

With the relative number of female main characters in TV shows generally on the rise, the series gives female characters the same attention as men, which the BBC regarded as an innovation for Spanish television. While many plot lines in the heist series still relate to males, the female characters become increasingly aware of gender-related issues, such as Mónica arguing in part 3 that women, just like men, could be robbers and a good parent. Critics further examined feminist themes and a rejection of machismo in the series through Nairobi and her phrase "The matriarchy begins" in part 2, and a comparative scene in part 3, where Palermo claims a patriarchy in a moment that, according to CNET, is played for laughs. La Vanguardia challenged any female-empowering claims in the series, as Úrsula Corberó (Tokyo) was often shown scantily clad, and Esquire criticized how characters' relationship problems in part 3 were often portrayed to be the women's fault. Alba Flores (Nairobi) saw no inherent feminist plot in the series, as women only take control when it suits the story, whilst Esther Acebo (Mónica) described any feminist subtext in the show as not being vindicative.

== Broadcast and release ==
=== Original broadcast ===
Viewers per episode (millions)

Part 1 aired on free-to-air Spanish TV channel Antena 3 in the Wednesday 10:40 p.m. time slot from 2 May 2017 till 27 June 2017. Part 2 moved to the Monday 10:40 p.m. time slot and was broadcast from 16 October 2017 till 23 November 2017, with the originally planned 18 to 21 episodes cut down to 15. As the series was developed with Spanish prime-time television in mind, the episodes had a length of around 70 minutes, as is typical for Spanish television. The first five episodes of part 1 were followed by an aftershow entitled Tercer Grado (Third Grade).

Despite boycott calls after Itziar Ituño (Raquel Murillo) had protested against the accommodations of ETA prisoners of her home Basque Country in March 2016, the show had the best premiere of a Spanish series since April 2015, with more than four million viewers and the majority share of viewers in its timeslot, almost double the number of the next highest-viewed station/show. The show received good reviews and remained a leader in the commercial target group for the first half of part 1, but the viewership eventually slipped to lower figures than expected by the Antena 3 executives. Argentine newspaper La Nación attributed the decrease in viewer numbers to the change in time slots, the late broadcast times and the summer break between the parts. Pina saw the commercial breaks as responsible, as they disrupted the narrative flow of the series that otherwise played almost in real time, even though the breaks were factored in during writing. La Vanguardia saw the interest waning only among the conventional audience, as the plot unfolded too slowly at the rate of one episode per week. Writer Javier Gómez Santander regarded the series' run on Antena 3 as a "failure" in 2019, as the ratings declined to "nothing special", but commended Antena 3 for making a series that did not rely on typical stand-alone episodes.

=== Netflix acquisition ===
Part 1 was made available on Netflix Spain on 1 July 2017, like other series belonging to Antena 3's parent media group Atresmedia. In December 2017, Netflix acquired the exclusive global streaming rights for the series. Netflix re-cut the series into 22 episodes of around 50 minutes' length. Cliffhangers and scenes had to be divided and moved to other episodes, but this proved less drastic than expected because of the series' perpetual plot twists. Netflix dubbed the series and renamed it from La casa de papel to Money Heist for distribution in the English-speaking world, releasing the first part on 20 December 2017 without any promotion. The second part was made available for streaming on 6 April 2018. Pina assessed the viewer experience on Antena 3 versus Netflix as "very different", although the essence of the series remained the same.

"[Money Heist had] no promotion or anything. Netflix put it in that pile of series that it has, which is like the sock drawer that you never look in and from which only the algorithm can rescue you, and we didn't think it was a big deal."

Sin promoción ni nada. Netflix la metió en ese montón de series que tiene, que es como el cajón de los calcetines que nunca miras y de donde sólo te puede rescatar el algoritmo, y no le dimos ninguna importancia.

— Writer Javier Gómez Santander, September 2019

Without a dedicated Netflix marketing campaign, the series became the most-watched non-English language series on Netflix in early 2018, within four months of being added to the platform, to the creators' surprise. In April, it surpassed Stranger Things' streams in the U.S. and worldwide. Its success prompted Netflix to sign a global exclusive overall deal with Pina shortly afterwards. Diego Ávalos, director of original content for Netflix in Europe, noted that the series was atypical in being watched across many different profile groups. Common explanations for the drastic differences in viewership between Antena 3 and Netflix were changed consumption habits of series viewers and the binge-watching potential of streaming. Some people in Spain also only became aware of the series from Netflix, unaware of its original Antena 3 broadcast. Pina and Sonia Martínez of Antena 3 would also later say that the series, with its high demand of viewer attention, unknowingly followed the video-on-demand format from the beginning.

=== Renewal ===
In October 2017, Álex Pina said that part 2 had remote but intentional spin-off possibilities, and that his team was open to continue the robbers' story in the form of movies or a Netflix renewal. Following the show's success on the streaming platform, Netflix approached Pina and Atresmedia to produce new chapters for the originally self-contained story. The writers withdrew themselves for more than two months to decide on a direction, creating a bible with central ideas for new episodes in the process. The crucial factors in accepting Netflix's deal were the creators recognising that characters still had things to say, and having the opportunity to deviate from the perfectly orchestrated heist of the first two parts. Adamant that the story should be set in Spain again, the producers wanted to make it a sequel rather than a direct continuation, and expand on the familiarity and affection between the characters instead of the former group of strangers. Rio's capture was chosen as the catalyst to get the gang back together because he as the narrator's boyfriend represented the necessary emotional factor for the renewal not to be "suicide."

Netflix officially renewed the series for the third part with a considerably increased budget on 18 April 2018, which might make part 3 the most expensive series per episode in Spanish television history, according to Variety. As writing was in progress, Pina stated in July 2018 that he appreciated Netflix's decision to make the episodes 45 to 50 minutes of length, as the narrative could be more compressed and international viewers would have more freedom to consume the story in smaller parts. With Netflix's new push to improve the quality and appeal of its English-language versions of foreign shows, and over 70 percent of viewers in the United States choosing dubs over subtitles for the series, Netflix hired a new dubbing crew for part 3 and re-dubbed the first two parts accordingly. Part 3, consisting of eight episodes, was released on 19 July 2019; the first two episodes of part 3 also had a limited theatrical release in Spain one day before.

In August 2019, Netflix announced that part 3 was streamed by 34 million household accounts within its first week of release, of which 24 million finished the series within this period, thereby making it one of the most-watched productions on Netflix of all time, regardless of language. The viewership of part 3 increased, when Netflix reported that part 3 was viewed 44 million households during its first month and became the most popular show on Netflix during the third quarter. Netflix had an estimated 148 million subscribers world-wide in mid-2019. In October 2019, Netflix ranked Money Heist as their third-most-watched TV series for the past twelve months, and named it as the most-watched series across several European markets in 2019, including France, Spain and Italy, though not the UK. Twitter ranked the show fourth in its "Top TV shows worldwide" of 2019.

Filming of an initially unannounced fourth part of eight episodes ended in August 2019. Álex Pina and writer Javier Gómez Santander stated that unlike part 3, where the intention was to re-attract the audience with high-energy drama after the move to Netflix, the story of part 4 would unfold slower and be more character-driven. At another occasion, Pina and executive producer Esther Martínez Lobato teased part 4 as the "most traumatic [part] of all" because "this much tension has to explode somewhere". Alba Flores (Nairobi) said the scriptwriters had previously made many concessions to fans in part 3, but would go against audience wishes in part 4 and that "anyone who loves Nairobi will suffer". According to Pedro Alonso (Berlin), the focus of part 4 would be on saving Nairobi's life and standing by each other to survive. Part 4 was released on 3 April 2020; a documentary involving the producers and the cast premiered on Netflix the same day, titled Money Heist: The Phenomenon. Part 4 broke numerous viewership records for a non-English Netflix series, attracting 65 million of households during its first four weeks, and went to become the most watched non-English series at the time.

In November 2019, La Vanguardia quoted director Jesús Colmenar's statement "That there is going to be a fifth [part] can be said", and that the new part would be filmed after Vancouver Media's new project Sky Rojo. Colmenar also stated that there have been discussions with Netflix about creating a spin-off of the series, as well as Pina. On 31 July 2020, Netflix renewed the show for a fifth and final part. On 24 May 2021, it was announced that the fifth part of the show would be released in two five-episode volumes on 3 September and 3 December, respectively. Similar to Money Heist: The Phenomenon, a two-part documentary involving the producers and cast premiered on Netflix the same day, titled Money Heist: From Tokyo to Berlin. In February 2024, TheWrap reported that parts 3, 4 and 5 rank on Netflix's most popular non-English TV list, and part 4 was in second place as the most watched installment of the series, with 106 million views at the time.

== Reception ==
=== Critical reception ===
The series' beginning on Antena 3 was received well by Spanish media. Nayín Costas of El Confidencial named the premiere a promising start that captivated viewers with "adrenaline, well-dosed touches of humor and a lot of tension," but considered it a challenge to maintain the dramatic tension for the remainder of the series. While considering the pilot's voice-over narration unnecessary and the sound editing and dialogs lacking, Natalia Marcos of El País enjoyed the show's ensemble cast and the ambition, saying "It is daring, brazen and entertaining, at least when it starts. Now we want more, which is not little." Reviewing the full first part, Marcos lauded the series for its outstanding direction, the musical selection and for trying to innovate Spanish television, but criticized the length and ebbing tension. At the end of the series' original run, Nayín Costas of El Confidencial commended the series for its "high quality closure" that may make the finale "one of the best episodes of the Spanish season", but regretted that it aimed to satisfy viewers with a predictable happy ending rather than risk to "do something different, original, ambitious", and that the show was unable to follow in the footsteps of Pina's Locked Up.

After the show's move to Netflix for its international release, Adrian Hennigan of the Israeli Haaretz said the series was "more of a twisty thriller than soapy telenovela, driven by its ingenious plot, engaging characters, tense flash points, pulsating score and occasional moments of humor", but taunted the English title "Money Heist" as bland. In a scathing review, Pauline Bock of the British magazine New Statesman questioned the global hype of the series, saying that it was "full of plot holes, clichéd slow-motions, corny love stories and gratuitous sex scenes", before continuing to add that "the music is pompous, the voice-over irritating, and it's terribly edited". John Doyle of The Globe and Mail praised parts 1 and 2 for the heist genre subversions; he also said that the series could be "deliciously melodramatic at times" with "outrageous twists and much passion" like a telenovela. Jennifer Keishin Armstrong of the BBC saw the series' true appeal in the interpersonal dramas emerging through the heist between "the beautiful robbers, their beautiful hostages, and the beautiful authorities trying to negotiate with them." David Hugendick of Die Zeit found the series "sometimes a bit sentimental, a little cartoonesque," and the drama sometimes too telenovela-like, but "all with a good sense for timing and spectacle."

Review aggregator website Rotten Tomatoes gave part 3 an approval rating of 100% based on 12 reviews, with an average rating of 7/10. The site's critical consensus reads, "An audacious plan told in a non-linear fashion keeps the third installment moving as Money Heist refocuses on the relations between its beloved characters." While lauding the technical achievements, Javier Zurro of El Español described the third part as "first-class entertainment" that was unable to transcend its roots and lacked novelty. He felt unaffected by the internal drama between the characters and specifically, disliked Tokyo's narration for its hollowness. Alex Jiménez of Spanish newspaper ABC found part 3 mostly succeeding in its attempts to reinvent the show and stay fresh. Euan Ferguson of The Guardian recommended watching part 3, as "it's still a glorious Peaky Blinders, just with tapas and subtitles," while Pere Solà Gimferrer of La Vanguardia found that the number of plot holes in part 3 could only be endured with constant suspension of disbelief. Though entertained, Alfonso Rivadeneyra García of Peruvian newspaper El Comercio said the show does "what it does best: pretend to be the most intelligent boy in class when, in fact, it is only the cleverest."

=== Public response ===
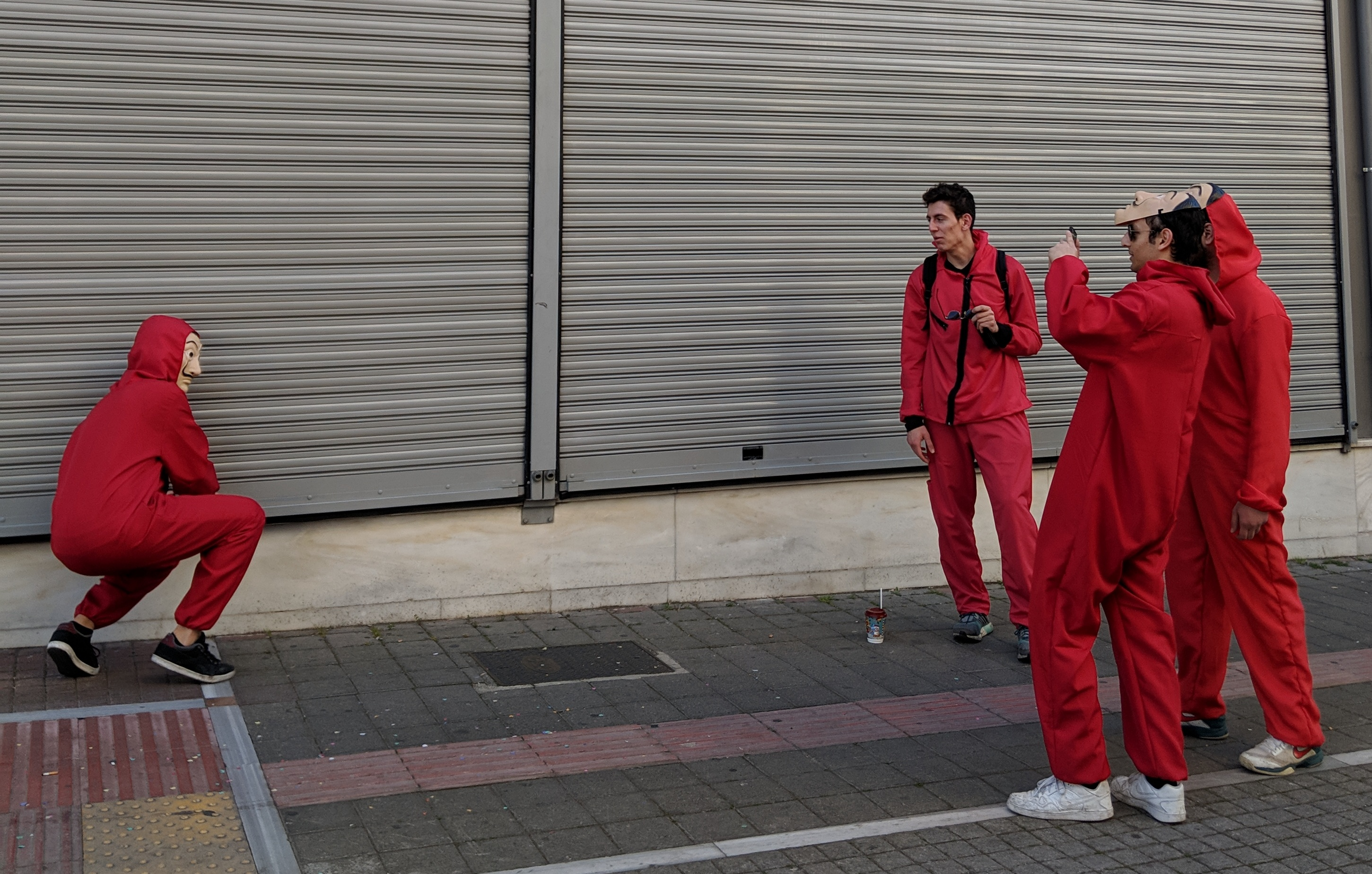
Cosplay in Patras, Greece, in 2019.

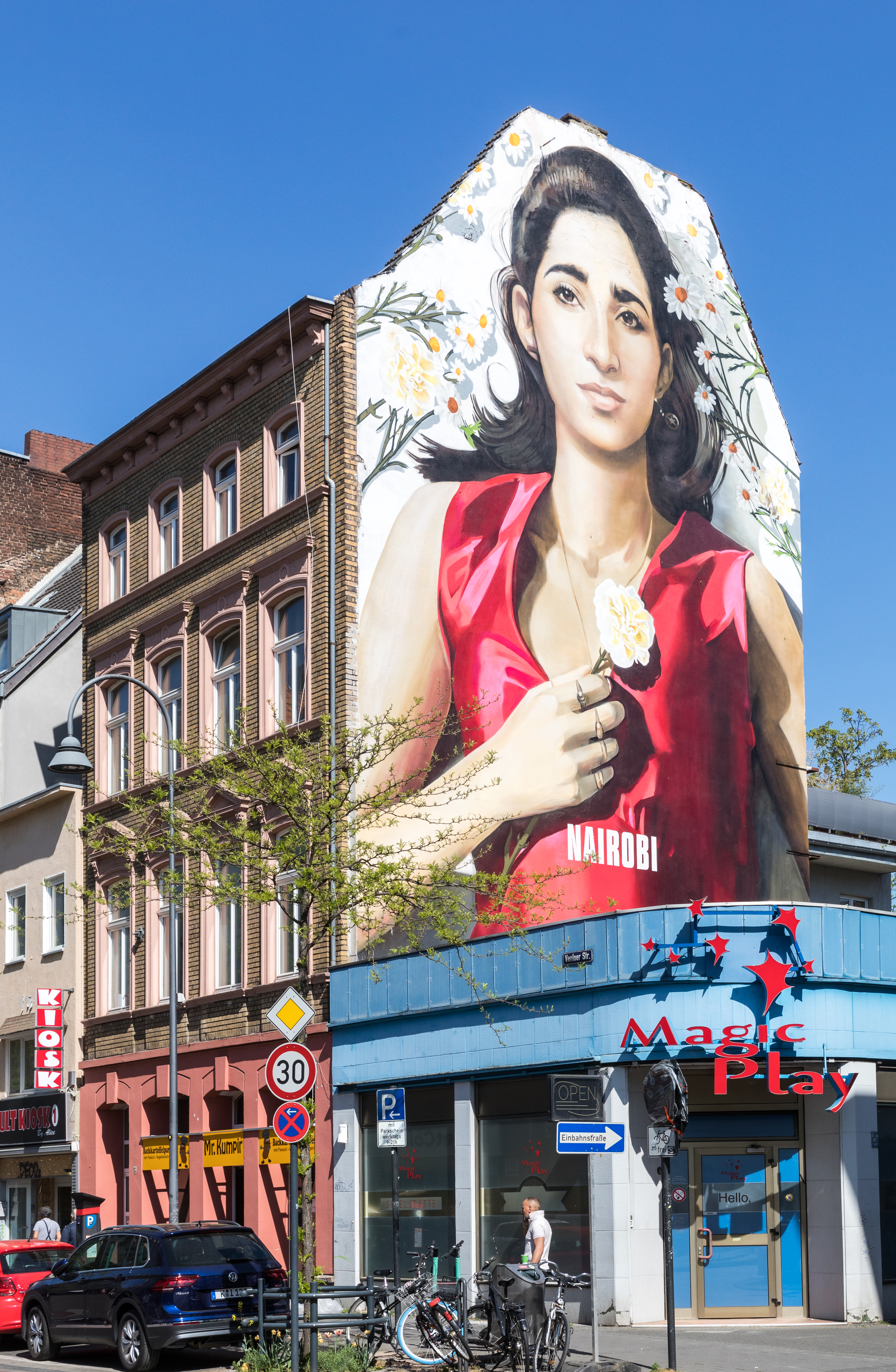
Nairobi mural in Ehrenfeld, Cologne, Germany.

After the move to Netflix, the series remained the most-followed series on Netflix for six consecutive weeks and became one of the most popular series on IMDb. It regularly trended on Twitter world-wide, largely because celebrities commented on it, such as football players Neymar and Marc Bartra, American singer Romeo Santos, and author Stephen King. While users flooded social networks with media of themselves wearing the robbers' outfit, the robbers' costumes were worn at the Rio Carnival, and Dalí icons were shown on huge banners in Saudi Arabia football stadiums. Real footage of these events would later be shown in part 3 as a tribute to the show's international success. The Musée Grévin in Paris added statues of the robbers to its wax museum in summer 2018. The show's iconography was used prominently by third parties for advertising, sports presentations, and in porn.

Although the show's first two parts were popular, the domestic market in Spain failed to convince Antena 3 to continue the series and it was shelved until international response escalated to the point where the cast and crew were called back for another two seasons.

There have also been negative responses to the influence of the show. In numerous incidents, real heist men wore the show's red costumes and Dalì masks in their attacks or copied the fictional robbers' infiltration plans. The robbers' costumes were banned at the 2019 Limassol Carnival Festival as a security measure as a result. The series was used in an attack on YouTube, when hackers removed the most-played song in the platform's history, "Despacito", and left an image of the show instead.

Spanish newspaper El Mundo saw the public response as a reflection of the "climate of global disenchantment" where the robbers represent the "perfect antiheroes", and the New Statesman explained the show's resonance with international audiences as coming from the "social and economic tensions it depicts, and because of the utopian escape it offers." Viewer response was especially high in Mediterranean Europe and the Latin world, in particular Spain, Italy, France, Portugal, Brazil, Chile and Argentina, so Spanish as a common language did not appear to be a unifying reason for the show's success. Writer Javier Gómez Santander and actor Pedro Alonso (Berlin) rather argued that the Latin world used to feel at the periphery of global importance, but a new sentiment was coming that Spain could compete with the global players in terms of media production levels and give the rest of the world a voice.

Netflix partnered with the video game Tom Clancy's Rainbow Six Siege for an in-game event, where hostages on the Bank map, wore Money Heist outfits. Outfits for two in-game characters were purchasable and the music in the background during the heist, was "Bella Ciao".

The series is one of two Spanish-language TV series to be featured in TV Time's top 50 most followed TV shows ever, currently being the fifth most followed series on the platform.

== Awards and nominations ==
Year	Award	Category	Nominees	Result	Ref.
2017	19th Iris Awards	Best screenplay	Álex Pina, Esther Martínez Lobato, David Barrocal, Pablo Roa, Esther Morales, Fernando Sancristóbal, Javier Gómez Santander	Won	
2017	FesTVal	Best direction in fiction	Jesús Colmenar, Alejandro Bazzano, Miguel Ángel Vivas, Álex Rodrigo	Nominated	
2017	FesTVal	Best fiction (by critics)	Money Heist	Nominated	
2017	Fotogramas de Plata	Audience Award – Best Spanish Series	Money Heist	Won	
2017	Fotogramas de Plata	Best TV Actor	Pedro Alonso	Nominated	
2018	46th International Emmy Awards	Best drama series	Money Heist	Won	
2018	20th Iris Award	Best actress	Úrsula Corberó	Won	
2018	20th Iris Award	Best series	Money Heist	Nominated	
2018	MiM Series	Best direction	Jesús Colmenar, Alejandro Bazzano, Miguel Ángel Vivas, Álex Rodrigo	Won	
2018	Golden Nymph	Best drama TV series	Money Heist	Won	
2018	Spanish Actors Union	Best supporting television actor	Pedro Alonso	Won	
2018	Spanish Actors Union	Best supporting television actress	Alba Flores	Nominated	
2018	Spanish Actors Union	Best television actor	Álvaro Morte	Nominated	
2018	Spanish Actors Union	Best TV cast actor	Jaime Lorente	Nominated	
2018	Spanish Actors Union	Best stand-out actress	Esther Acebo	Nominated	
2018	Premios Fénix	Best series	Money Heist	Nominated	
2018	Festival de Luchon	Audience Choice Award	Money Heist	Won	
2018	Festival de Luchon	Jury Spanish Series Award	Money Heist	Won	
2018	Camille Awards	composer	Iván Martínez Lacámara	Nominated	
2018	Camille Awards	composer	Manel Santisteban	Nominated	
2018	Camille Awards	Production Company	Vancouver Media	Nominated	
2018	5th Feroz Awards	Best Drama Series	Money Heist	Nominated	
2018	5th Feroz Awards	Best Lead Actress in a Series	Úrsula Corberó	Nominated	
2018	5th Feroz Awards	Best Lead Actor in a Series	Álvaro Morte	Nominated	
2018	5th Feroz Awards	Best Supporting Actress in a Series	Alba Flores	Nominated	
2018	5th Feroz Awards	Best Supporting Actor in a Series	Paco Tous	Nominated	
2019	21st Iris Awards	Best actor	Álvaro Morte	Won	
2019	21st Iris Awards	Best actress	Alba Flores	Won	
2019	21st Iris Awards	Best direction	Jesús Colmenar, Álex Rodrigo, Koldo Serra, Javier Quintas	Won	
2019	21st Iris Awards	Best fiction	Money Heist	Won	
2019	21st Iris Awards	Best production	Cristina López Ferrar	Won	
2019	Spanish Actors Union	Lead Performance, Male	Álvaro Morte	Won	
2019	Spanish Actors Union	Lead Performance, Female	Alba Flores	Nominated	
2019	Spanish Actors Union	Supporting Performance, Male	Jaime Lorente	Nominated	
2020	7th Feroz Awards	Best drama series	Money Heist	Nominated	
2020	7th Feroz Awards	Best leading actor of a series	Álvaro Morte	Nominated	
2020	7th Feroz Awards	Best supporting actress in a series	Alba Flores	Nominated	
2020	Fotogramas de Plata	Audience Award – Best Spanish Series	Money Heist	Nominated	
2020	Fotogramas de Plata	Best TV Actor	Álvaro Morte	Nominated	
2020	Spanish Actors Union	Performance in a Minor Role, Male	Fernando Cayo	Won	
2020	Spanish Actors Union	Lead Performance, Female	Alba Flores	Nominated	
2020	7th Platino Awards	Best Miniseries or TV series	Money Heist	Won	
2020	7th Platino Awards	Best Male Performance in a Miniseries or TV series	Álvaro Morte	Won	
2020	7th Platino Awards	Best Female Performance in a Miniseries or TV series	Úrsula Corberó	Nominated	
2020	7th Platino Awards	Best Female Supporting Performance in a Miniseries or TV series	Alba Flores	Won	
2021	Forqué Awards	Best Fiction Series	Money Heist	Nominated	
2021	71st Fotogramas de Plata	Best Television Actress	Itziar Ituño	Nominated	
2022	12th Critics' Choice Television Awards	Best Foreign Language Series	Money Heist	Nominated	
2022	30th Actors and Actresses Union Awards	Best TV Actress in a Leading Role	Úrsula Corberó	Nominated	
2022	30th Actors and Actresses Union Awards	Best TV Actress in a Secondary Role	Belén Cuesta	Nominated	
2022	30th Actors and Actresses Union Awards	Best TV Actor in a Secondary Role	Fernando Cayo	Won	
2022	30th Actors and Actresses Union Awards	Best TV Actor in a Minor Role	Alberto Amarilla	Nominated	

== Adaptation and spin-off ==
=== South Korean adaptation ===
In November 2020, Netflix announced that it would create a South Korean adaptation of the show. The 12-part production, titled Money Heist: Korea - Joint Economic Area, would be a collaboration between BH Entertainment and Contents Zium, with Kim Hong-sun set to direct.

On 29 April 2022, Netflix revealed that Money Heist: Korea – Joint Economic Area: Part 1 would be released on 24 June 2022 and Part 2 would be released on 9 December 2022.

=== Spin-off series ===
In November 2021, Netflix announced that the character of Berlin would receive his own self-titled spin-off series, which was released on 29 December 2023. The series is created by Álex Pina and Esther Martínez Lobato, who "loved the idea of introducing a new gang around Berlin in a completely different emotional state". Berlin premiered in December 2023. The first and second season consists of eight episodes.
