= Álvaro Morte =

Spanish actor (born 1975)

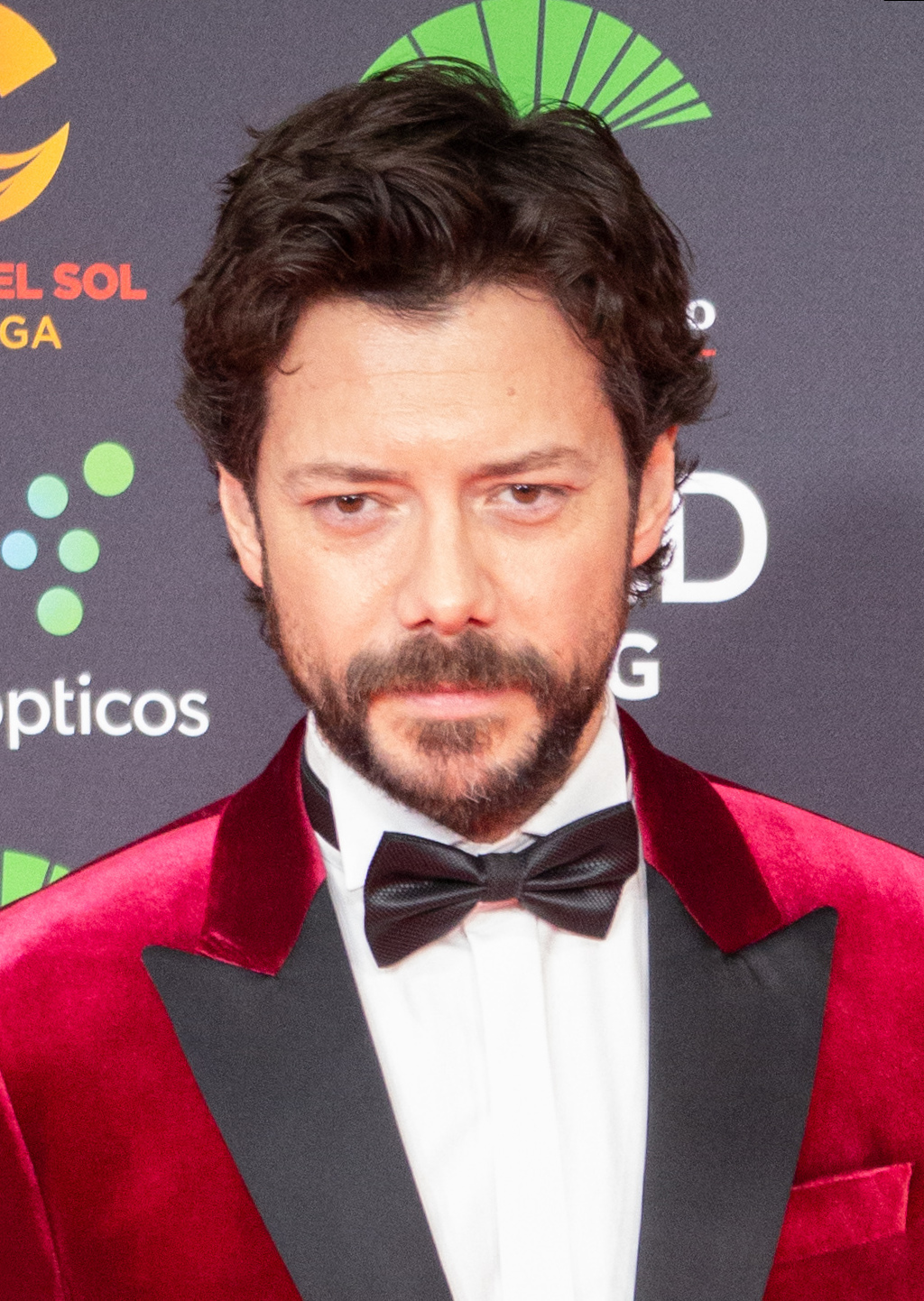
- Morte in 2020
- Born: Álvaro Antonio García Pérez; 23 February 1975 (age 51); Algeciras, Spain
- Occupation: Actor
- Years active: 2002–present
- Height: 6.1
- Children: 2

Álvaro Antonio García Pérez (born 23 February 1975), known professionally as Álvaro Morte, is a Spanish actor. He gained worldwide recognition for playing the role of 'The Professor' in the television series Money Heist. Morte briefly played Logain Ablar in the high fantasy series The Wheel of Time (2021–2023) and Adolfo Suárez in the historical drama miniseries The Anatomy of a Moment.

== Early life ==
Álvaro Antonio García Pérez was born on 23 February 1975 in Algeciras, province of Cádiz, soon relocating to Bujalance, province of Córdoba, with his family.

Originally enrolled into a degree of communications engineering, he switched to dramatic art, graduating from the Escuela Superior de Arte Dramático de Córdoba in 1999. He also took post-graduate studies for two months at the University of Tampere. After his time in Finland, he settled in Madrid. At the age of 33, he was diagnosed with a cancerous tumour in the left thigh, which he ultimately overcame.

== Career ==
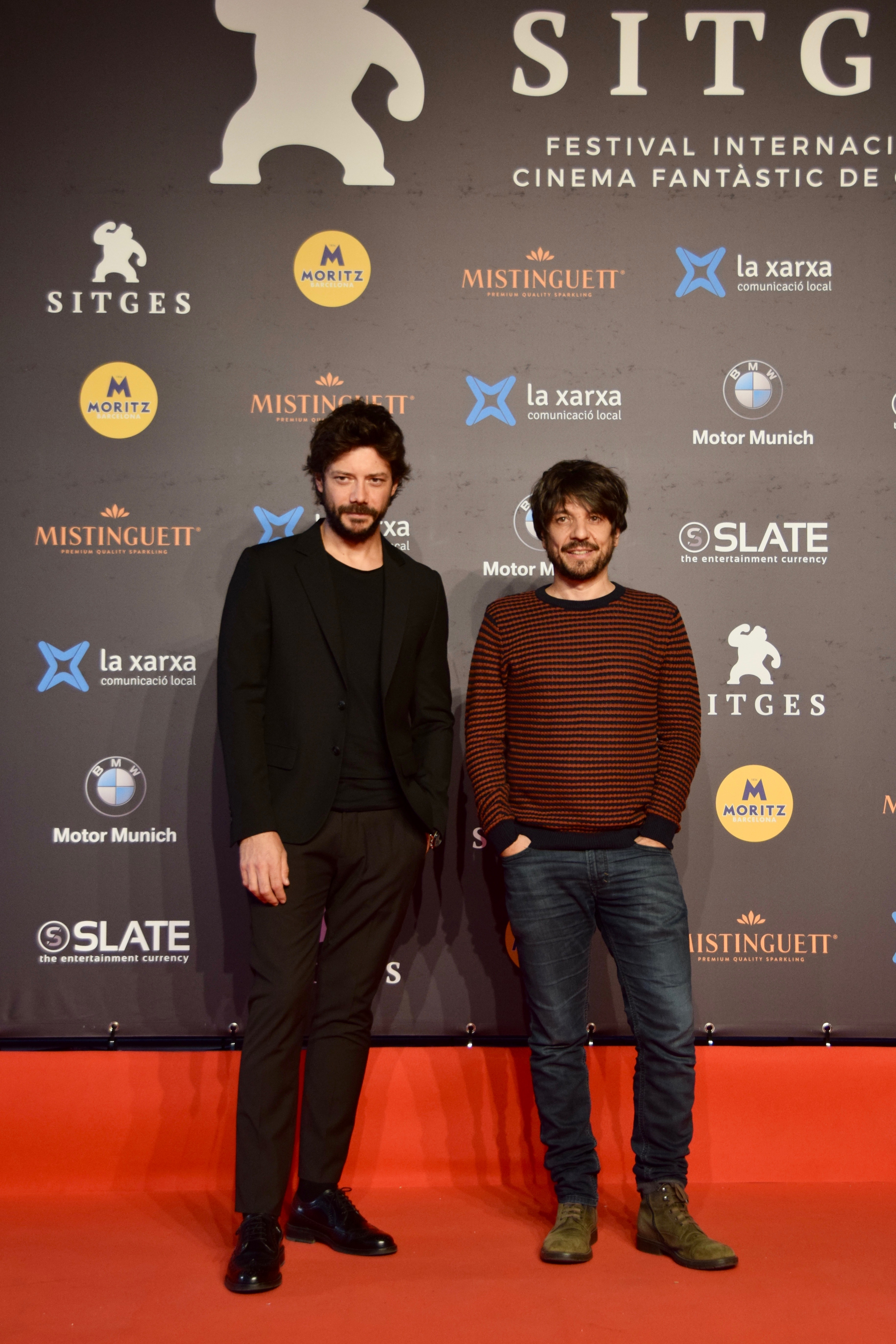
Morte with Oriol Paulo at the 2018 Sitges Film Festival

Morte began his acting career when he played a minor role in the Spanish television series Hospital Central. He landed his first main role in a TV series in Planta 25, aired on a number of Spanish regional TV broadcasters and in which he played Ray—a driver—from 2007 to 2008. He then played Adolfo Castillo in the Spanish television series Bandolera, Gabriel Areta in the soap opera Amar en tiempos revueltos.

Morte performed a minor role in Lola, la película (2007), a biopic film about the folkloric singer Lola Flores in which he briefly portrayed a bullfighter, lover of the protagonist.

In addition to his acting work, Morte owns a theatre company called 300 pistolas (English: 300 pistols), founded in 2012.

Morte joined the cast of the long-running telenovela El secreto de Puente Viejo in 2014, portraying Lucas Moliner—a small-town physician—until 2017.

Following his exit from Puente Viejo, Morte played the role of Sergio "el Profesor" Marquina in the television series La Casa de Papel. The first season aired on Antena 3 in 2017. He was heavily praised for his portrayal of the character—the meticulous criminal mastermind behind the heist plot central to the series—and has gained, along with the television series, worldwide fame. In late 2017, Netflix acquired the series and distributed it worldwide on its platform. Part two of the final season was released in December 2021.

He landed his first main role in a feature film in the Netflix film Mirage (2018).

Morte starred in the 2019 Movistar+ television series El embarcadero, playing Óscar, a man who has led a double life by, with two different women separately. In December 2019, Morte was announced to have joined the cast of the Amazon television series The Wheel of Time, an adaption of the epic fantasy novels of the same name, set to portray Logain. He appeared in nine episodes from 2021 to 2023 before the show was cancelled in early-2025.

In April 2021, he was announced to have been cast as Juan Sebastián Elcano in the miniseries Boundless. In 2024, he made his West End debut as Manuel in Bess Wohl's play, Barcelona, opposite Lily Collins at the Duke of York's Theatre, which ran through January 2025. Morte then performed a major role in the 2024 film, Immaculate, alongside Sydney Sweeney.

== Filmography ==
Key
†	Denotes films that have not yet been released

=== Film ===
Year	Title	Role	Notes	Ref.
2007	Lola, la película (Lola, the Movie)	Rafael Torres		
2018	Durante la tormenta (Mirage)	David Ortiz		
2018	Smallfoot	Gwangi (voice)	European Spanish dubbing	
2022	Objetos (Lost & Found)	Mario		
2024	Immaculate	Father Sal Tedeschi		
2024	Raqa (Raqqa: Spy vs. Spy)	Haibala		
2025	8			
2025	Aztec Batman: Clash of Empires	Hernán Cortés / Two Face		
TBA	Ana no †	Trinidad		

=== Television ===
Year	Title	Role	Notes	Ref.
2002	Hospital Central	Buzo/Bombero	Episodes: "El soldadito de plomo", credited as Álvaro A. García, "El vuelo de la suerte", credited as Álvaro Antonio García	
2002	Policías, en el corazón de la calle	—N/a	3 episodes, credited as Álvaro Antonio García	
2007–08	Planta 25	Ray	Main role; 64 episodes, credited as Álvaro Antonio García	
2008	Aída	Jefe Gasolinera	Episode: "Lleno, por favor", credited as Álvaro Antonio	
2009	¡A ver si llego!	Pablo	6 episodes	
2009–10	Cuéntame cómo pasó	Toño	4 episodes	
2010	Las chicas de oro	—N/a	Episode: "Un lecho de rosas"	
2012	Isabel	Soldado de Girón	Episode: "La negociación", credited as Alvaro Morte	
2012	La memoria del agua	—N/a	Miniseries; Episodes: "Episode #1.1", "Episode #1.2"	
2012–13	Bandolera	Adolfo Castillo	14 episodes	
2014	Bienvenidos al Lolita	—N/a	Miniseries; 4 episodes	
2014	El Príncipe	—N/a	Episode: "Haz lo que tengas que hacer"	
2014	Víctor Ros	Donato Vergel	Episode: "El misterio de la Casa Aranda"	
2014	Amar en tiempos revueltos	Gabriel Areta	Main role; 32 episodes	
2014–17	El secreto de Puente Viejo	Lucas Moliner	Main role; 92 episodes	
2017–21	La Casa de Papel	Sergio Marquina aka El Profesor	Main role; 41 episodes	
2019–20	El embarcadero	Óscar	Main role	
2020	El último show	Himself	1 episode	
2020	The Head	Ramón	Main role; 6 episodes	
2021–2023	The Wheel of Time	Logain Ablar	Main role	
2022	Sin límites (Boundless)	Juan Sebastián Elcano	Lead role	
2022	Historias para no dormir (Stories to Stay Awake)	TBA	Episode "La pesadilla"	
2025	Dos tumbas (Two Graves)	Rafael Salazar		
2025	Anatomía de un instante (The Anatomy of a Moment)	Adolfo Suárez		
2026	This City Is Ours	Felipe Guzman		

== Awards and nominations ==
Year	Award	Category	Work	Result	Ref.
2018	5th Feroz Awards	Best Main Actor in a TV Series	Money Heist	Nominated	
2018	27th Actors and Actresses Union Awards	Best Television Actor in a Leading Role	Money Heist	Nominated	
2019	28th Actors and Actresses Union Awards	Best Television Actor in a Leading Role	Money Heist	Won	
2019	21st Iris Awards	Best Actor	Money Heist	Won	
2020	7th Platino Awards	Best Actor in a Miniseries or TV Series	Money Heist	Won	
2020	25th Zapping Awards	Best Actor	Money Heist	Won	
2021	68th Ondas Awards	Best Actor in Spanish Fiction (TV)	Money Heist	Won	
2025	33rd Actors and Actresses Union Awards	Best Actor in an International Production	Immaculate	Nominated	
2025	31st Forqué Awards	Best Actor in a Series	The Anatomy of a Moment	Nominated	
2026	13th Feroz Awards	Best Main Actor in a Series	The Anatomy of a Moment	Nominated	
2026	34th Actors and Actresses Union Awards	Best Television Actor in a Leading Role	The Anatomy of a Moment	Won	
2026	13th Platino Awards	Best Actor in a Miniseries or TV Series	The Anatomy of a Moment	Nominated	
