= Money Heist (franchise) =

Spanish heist crime drama media franchise

- Official franchise logo (Spanish language)
- Created by: Álex Pina
- Original work: Money Heist (2017–2021)
- Owners: Atresmedia Televisión (2017–2018); Netflix (2018–present)
- Years: 2017–present

Films and television
- Television series: Money Heist (2017–2021); Money Heist: Korea – Joint Economic Area (2022); Berlin (2023-2026)

Games
- Video game(s): Money Heist: Ultimate Choice (2024)

Miscellaneous
- Making-of documentaries: Money Heist: The Phenomenon (2020); Money Heist: From Tokyo to Berlin (2021)

Money Heist (Spanish: La Casa de Papel, lit. 'The House of Paper') is a Spanish heist crime drama media franchise centered on the television series Money Heist, which followed two long-prepared heists led by the Professor. Created by Álex Pina, the narrative of the series is told in a real-time-like fashion, relying on flashbacks, time-jumps, hidden character motivations, and an unreliable narrator (Tokyo) for complexity.

The original series premiered on Spanish network Antena 3 on May 2, 2017, initially intended as a two-part, 15-episode limited series. With positive reviews and despite little ratings success during its initial run, it went on to become an international hit when the first part was released on Netflix in late 2017. Due to its success, Netflix bought the rights from Antena 3's parent company, Atresmedia Televisión, and ordered 26 additional episodes that were released as three subsequent parts. The fifth and final part was released in two volumes, on September 3 and December 3, 2021. Following the series' conclusion, a South Korean remake, Money Heist: Korea – Joint Economic Area, was released in two parts on June 24 and December 9, 2022, and received positive reviews. A spin-off of the original series, Berlin, premiered on 29 December 2023.

In addition to the television series, the making-of documentary films, Money Heist: The Phenomenon and Money Heist: From Tokyo to Berlin, were released between 2020 and 2021. A video game was also released in 2024.

== Background ==
The initial idea for Money Heist dates back to sometime during creator and head writer Álex Pina and director Jesús Colmenar's years of collaboration at Globomedia, where they first coincided in 2008. In spring 2016, after production of the second season of Locked Up ended, the two left Globomedia to start their own production company, Vancouver Media, and their two options for the company's debut project were a comedy project and a heist story for television, before ultimately settling for the latter. Pina and Colmenar started developing the series, then titled Los desahuciados (lit. 'The Evicted'), alongside former Globomedia and Locked Up colleagues, as a passion project to try new things without outside interference. Pina eventually pitched the series to Atresmedia's then-Head of Fiction, Sonia Martínez, who told him to "do it".

The series was first announced in November 2016 as a limited television series, something that Pina was firm about as he felt that dilution had become a problem for his previous productions. The limited series was then split into two parts, shot back-to-back due to financial necessity. Casting took place in late 2016 and filming began in late January 2017. The series premiered on Atresmedia's main television network Antena 3 on May 2, 2017, and while its first episode ended up being the most-viewed premiere for a Spanish series since Down Below in April 2015, ratings quickly declined during the show's first part, despite positive reviews, and fell even further during the second part, before ending on November 23, 2017. After the first part finished, Netflix included it in its catalogue in Spain after acquiring the series in July 2017, with plans for an international release in Autumn of that year.

On December 20, 2017, one month after Money Heist ended on Antena 3, Netflix released the first part outside Spain without any promotion, re-cutting its nine 70-minute episodes into 13 50-minute episodes. A similar recut was done to the second part of the series, with its six episodes being turned into nine, which was released outside Spain on April 6, 2018. Despite giving it no promotion, the series became an unexpected international hit on Netflix and went on to become the most-watched foreign-language series in the service's history at the time. As a result of this success, in April 2018, after the release of the second part on the service, Netflix bought the rights to Money Heist from Atresmedia and announced that it would produce a third part, which was shot back-to-back with an additional fourth part, much like the first two parts. The third and fourth parts were released on July 19, 2019, and April 3, 2020, respectively. In July 2020, Netflix renewed the series for a fifth and final part, which was itself separated in two volumes that were released on September 3 and December 3, 2021, respectively. In June 2020, BH Entertainment and Zium Content entered negotiations with Netflix for a potential South Korean remake of Money Heist. In December 2020, the remake was officially announced and greenlit with a total of 12 episodes. Much like the original series, the remake, titled Money Heist: Korea – Joint Economic Area, was split into two parts, with the first part being released on June 24, 2022, on Netflix, and the second part being released on December 9, 2022.

In November 2021, shortly before the release of Money Heist's final episodes, Netflix announced that it had commissioned a spin-off series titled Berlin, starring Pedro Alonso's character from the original series, with a 2023 release date. On September 28, 2022, Michelle Jenner, Begoña Vargas, Tristán Ulloa, Julio Peña Fernández and Joel Sánchez were cast to co-star alongside Alonso. In March 2023, it was announced that Itziar Ituño and Najwa Nimri would also be reprising their roles as Raquel Murillo and Alicia Sierra from Money Heist. Filming began in October 2022 in Paris, France, and continued in Madrid, Spain. In February 2023, the series was scheduled via a teaser trailer to be released on Netflix in December 2023. In September 2023, Netflix announced that Berlin would be released on the service on December 29, 2023. In November 2023, Netflix released the final trailer of the series.

== Television series ==
Overview of Money Heist TV series
Series	Season	Episodes	Originally released		Showrunner(s)	Status
Series	Season	Episodes	First released	Last released	Showrunner(s)	Status
Money Heist	1	9	May 2, 2017	June 27, 2017	Álex Pina	Concluded
Money Heist	2	6	October 16, 2017	November 23, 2017	Álex Pina	Concluded
Money Heist	3	8	July 19, 2019		Álex Pina	Concluded
Money Heist	4	8	April 3, 2020		Álex Pina	Concluded
Money Heist	5	10	September 3, 2021	December 3, 2021	Álex Pina	Concluded
Money Heist: Korea – Joint Economic Area	1	12	June 24, 2022	December 9, 2022	Kim Hong-sun	Concluded
Berlin	1	8	December 29, 2023		Álex Pina and Esther Martínez Lobato	Concluded
Berlin	2	8	15 May 2026		Álex Pina and Esther Martínez Lobato	Concluded

=== Money Heist (2017–2021) ===
The first two parts of Money Heist follow a mysterious man in Madrid, Sergio Marquina (Álvaro Morte), better known as "the Professor", who recruits a group of eight people, who choose city names as their aliases – Silene Oliveira "Tokyo" (Úrsula Corberó), Andrés de Fonollosa "Berlin" (Pedro Alonso), Agustín Ramos "Moscow" (Paco Tous), Ágata Jiménez "Nairobi" (Alba Flores), Aníbal Cortés "Rio" (Miguel Herrán), Daniel Ramos "Denver" (Jaime Lorente), Mirko Dragić "Helsinki" (Darko Perić) and Radko Dragić "Oslo" (Roberto García Ruiz) –, to carry out an ambitious plan that involves entering the Royal Mint of Spain, and escaping with €2.4 billion. After taking 67 people hostage inside the Mint, the team plans to remain inside for 11 days to print the money as they deal with elite police forces.

In parts three to five, after the events of the heist on the Mint, the group's members are forced out of hiding after Río is caught thanks to an intercepted phone, and prepare for a second heist, this time on the Bank of Spain, with some additional members – Martín Berrote "Palermo" (Rodrigo de la Serna), Santiago Lopez "Bogotá" (Hovik Keuchkerian) and Jakov "Marseille" (Luka Peroš)–, to force Europol to hand over Rio and prevent his torture. After entering the Bank, they aim to escape with gold, as they deal once again with hostages and police forces.

=== Money Heist: Korea – Joint Economic Area (2022) ===
As a remake of Money Heist, Money Heist: Korea – Joint Economic Area follows a similar story to that of the original series. Set in a reunified Korea that came to be due to a Joint Economic Area built at the expense of the lower classes, strategist criminal mastermind Park Sun-ho (Yoo Ji-tae), nicknamed "the Professor", enlists a group of people, who choose city names as their aliases – Lee Hong-dan "Tokyo" (Jeon Jong-seo), Song Jung-ho "Berlin" (Park Hae-soo), Oh Man-sik "Moscow" (Lee Won-jong), Sim Young-mun "Nairobi" (Jang Yoon-ju), Han Joseph "Rio" (Lee Hyun-woo), Oh Taek-su "Denver" (Kim Ji-hoon), Ko Myung-tae "Helsinki" (Kim Ji-hun) and Lee Sang-yeon "Oslo" (Lee Kyu-ho) – to pull a ₩4 trillion heist on the Mint based in the Joint Economic Area. After successfully entering the Mint and taking the hostages inside, the team attempts to remain inside for enough days to print the money while the police tries to stop them.

=== Berlin (2023-2026) ===
Set in an "undefined past" before the events of Money Heist, Berlin focuses on Berlin while at his prime, as he prepares one of his most extraordinary heists in his career as a robber: stealing €44 million in jewels as if it was an illusionism act. To do this, he has the help of one of the three gangs he has robbed with in his life, formed by Keila (Michelle Jenner), Damián (Tristán Ulloa), Cameron (Begoña Vargas), Bruce (Joel Sánchez) and Roi (Julio Peña Fernández).

== Documentaries ==
Overview of web series set in the Money Heist franchise
Series	Season	Episodes	Originally released		Showrunner(s)
Series	Season	Episodes	First released	Last released	Showrunner(s)
Money Heist: The Phenomenon	1	1	April 3, 2020		Luis Alfaro & Pablo Lejarreta
Money Heist: From Tokyo to Berlin	1	2	September 3, 2021	December 3, 2021	Luis Alfaro & Javier Gómez Santander

=== Money Heist: The Phenomenon (2020) ===
A documentary involving the producers and the cast of Money Heist, titled Money Heist: The Phenomenon (Spanish: La Casa de Papel: El Fenómeno), was released to Netflix on April 3, 2020. Looking at "how Money Heist became a global phenomenon", the series focuses on the series' "unexpected rise in popularity", its acquisition by Netflix, and its impact on culture across the world. It breaks down the production of the series, and includes interviews with the creators, cast and crew of the show.

=== Money Heist: From Tokyo to Berlin (2021) ===
A two-part sequel documentary, titled Money Heist: From Tokyo to Berlin and focusing on the production of the 26 additional episodes and the overall creation of the franchise of a whole, was released on 3 September and 3 December 2021, respectively, simultaneously with the final season of Money Heist.

== Recurring cast and characters ==
List indicators

This section includes characters who will appear or have appeared in the series.

- An empty grey cell indicates the character was not in the film, or that the character's official presence has not yet been confirmed.
- ^{A} indicates an appearance through archival footage or audio.
- ^{C} indicates a cameo role.
- ^{P} indicates an appearance in onscreen photographs.
- ^{V} indicates a voice-only role.
- ^{Y} indicates a younger version of the character.

Character	Money Heist						Money Heist: Korea – Joint Economic Area		Berlin
Character	Season 1		Season 2		Season 3		Money Heist: Korea – Joint Economic Area		Berlin
Character	Part 1	Part 2	Part 3	Part 4	Part 5 Vol. 1	Part 5 Vol. 2	Part 1	Part 2	Berlin
Tokyo Silene Oliveira / Lee Hong-dan	Úrsula Corberó	Úrsula Corberó	Úrsula Corberó	Úrsula Corberó	Úrsula Corberó	Úrsula Corberó	Jeon Jong-seo	Jeon Jong-seo	
The Professor Sergio Marquina / Salvador "Salva" Martín / Park Sun-ho	Álvaro Morte	Álvaro Morte	Álvaro Morte	Álvaro Morte	Álvaro Morte	Álvaro Morte	Yoo Ji-tae	Yoo Ji-tae	
Lisbon Raquel Murillo / Seon Woo-jin	Itziar Ituño	Itziar Ituño	Itziar Ituño	Itziar Ituño	Itziar Ituño	Itziar Ituño	Yunjin Kim	Yunjin Kim	Itziar Ituño
Berlin Andrés de Fonollosa / Song Jung-ho	Pedro Alonso	Pedro Alonso	Pedro Alonso	Pedro Alonso	Pedro Alonso	Pedro Alonso	Park Hae-soo	Park Hae-soo	Pedro Alonso
Moscow Agustín Ramos / Oh Man-sik	Paco Tous	Paco Tous	Paco Tous	Paco Tous	Paco Tous	Paco Tous	Lee Won-jong	Lee Won-jong	
Nairobi Ágata Jiménez / Sim Young-mun	Alba Flores	Alba Flores	Alba Flores	Alba Flores	Alba Flores	Alba Flores	Jang Yoon-ju	Jang Yoon-ju	
Rio Aníbal Cortés / Han Joseph	Miguel Herrán	Miguel Herrán	Miguel Herrán	Miguel Herrán	Miguel Herrán	Miguel Herrán	Lee Hyun-woo	Lee Hyun-woo	
Denver Daniel Ramos / Oh Taek-su	Jaime Lorente	Jaime Lorente	Jaime Lorente	Jaime Lorente	Jaime Lorente	Jaime Lorente	Kim Ji-hoon	Kim Ji-hoon	
Stockholm Mónica Gaztambide / Yoon Mi-seon	Esther Acebo	Esther Acebo	Esther Acebo	Esther Acebo	Esther Acebo	Esther Acebo	Lee Joo-bin	Lee Joo-bin	
Arturo Román / Cho Young-min	Enrique Arce	Enrique Arce	Enrique Arce	Enrique Arce	Enrique Arce	Enrique Arce	Park Myung-hoon	Park Myung-hoon	
Helsinki Mirko Dragic / Ko Myung-tae	Darko Perić	Darko Perić	Darko Perić	Darko Perić	Darko Perić	Darko Perić	Kim Ji-hun	Kim Ji-hun	
Ángel Rubio / Captain Cha Moo-hyuk	Fernando Soto	Fernando Soto	Fernando Soto	Fernando Soto	Fernando Soto	Fernando Soto	Kim Sung-oh	Kim Sung-oh	
Suárez	Mario de la Rosa	Mario de la Rosa	Mario de la Rosa	Mario de la Rosa	Mario de la Rosa	Mario de la Rosa			
Alberto Vicuña / Kim Sang-man	Miquel García Borda	Miquel García Borda		Miquel García Borda		Miquel García Borda	Jang Hyun-sung	Jang Hyun-sung	
Mariví Fuentes	Kiti Mánver	Kiti Mánver	Kiti Mánver	Kiti Mánver			Uncredited actress	Uncredited actress	
Oslo Dimitri Mostovói / Radko Dragić / Lee Sang-yeon	Roberto García Ruiz		Roberto García Ruiz				Lee Kyu-ho	Lee Kyu-ho	
Alison Parker / Anne Kim	María Pedraza	María Pedraza					Lee Si-woo	Lee Si-woo	
Colonel Alfonso Prieto	Juan Fernández	Juan Fernández	Juan Fernández	Juan Fernández		Juan Fernández			
Paula Vicuña Murillo	Naia Guz	Naia Guz	Naia Guz	Naia Guz					
Mercedes Colmenar	Anna Gras	Anna Gras							
Ariadna Cascales	Clara Alvarado	Clara Alvarado							
Torres	Antonio Cuellar Rodriguez	Antonio Cuellar Rodriguez							
Pablo Ruiz	Fran Morcillo								
César Gandía		José Manuel Poga	José Manuel Poga						
Bogotá Santiago Lopez			Hovik Keuchkerian	Hovik Keuchkerian	Hovik Keuchkerian	Hovik Keuchkerian			
Palermo Martín Berrote			Rodrigo de la Serna	Rodrigo de la Serna	Rodrigo de la Serna	Rodrigo de la Serna			
Alicia Sierra			Najwa Nimri	Najwa Nimri	Najwa Nimri	Najwa Nimri			Najwa Nimri
Marseille Jakov			Luka Peroš	Luka Peroš	Luka Peroš	Luka Peroš			
Manila Julia Martinez			Belén Cuesta	Belén Cuesta	Belén Cuesta	Belén Cuesta			
Colonel Luis Tamayo			Fernando Cayo	Fernando Cayo	Fernando Cayo	Fernando Cayo			
Pamplona Matías Caño			Ahikar Azcona	Ahikar Azcona	Ahikar Azcona	Ahikar Azcona			
Benito Antoñanzas			Antonio Romero	Antonio Romero	Antonio Romero	Antonio Romero			
Tatiana			Diana Gómez	Diana Gómez	Diana Gómez	Diana Gómez			
Mario Urbaneja			Pep Munné	Pep Munné	Pep Munné	Pep Munné			
Amanda			Olalla Hernández	Olalla Hernández	Olalla Hernández	Olalla Hernández			
Paquita			Mari Carmen Sánchez	Mari Carmen Sánchez	Mari Carmen Sánchez	Mari Carmen Sánchez			
Miguel Fernández			Carlos Suárez	Carlos Suárez	Carlos Suárez	Carlos Suárez			
Logroño Benjamín Martinez				Ramón Agirre Lasarte	Ramón Agirre Lasarte	Ramón Agirre Lasarte			
Antonio García Ferreras				Himself	Himself				
Sagasta					José Manuel Seda	José Manuel Seda			
Rafael					Patrick Criado	Patrick Criado			
Ramiro					Alberto Amarilla	Alberto Amarilla			
Arteche					Jennifer Miranda	Jennifer Miranda			
René					Miguel Ángel Silvestre				
Keila									Michelle Jenner
Damián									Tristán Ulloa
Cameron									Begoña Vargas
Bruce									Joel Sánchez
Roi									Julio Peña Fernández

== Reception ==
=== Critical reception ===
The first two parts of Money Heist received positive reviews from Spanish television critics. Nayín Costas of El Confidencial named the premiere a promising start that captivated viewers with "adrenaline, well-dosed touches of humor and a lot of tension," but considered it a challenge to maintain the dramatic tension for the remainder of the series. While considering the pilot's voice-over narration unnecessary and the sound editing and dialogs lacking, Natalia Marcos of El País enjoyed the show's ensemble cast and the ambition, saying "It is daring, brazen and entertaining, at least when it starts. Now we want more, which is not little." Reviewing the full first part, Marcos lauded the series for its outstanding direction, the musical selection and for trying to innovate Spanish television, but criticized the length and ebbing tension. At the end of the series' original run, Costas commended the series for its "high quality closure" that may make the finale "one of the best episodes of the Spanish season", but regretted that it aimed to satisfy viewers with a predictable happy ending rather than risk to "do something different, original, ambitious", and that the show was unable to follow in the footsteps of Pina's Locked Up.

After the series' move to Netflix for its international release, foreign critics also praised the series. Adrian Hennigan of the Israeli Haaretz said the series was "more of a twisty thriller than soapy telenovela, driven by its ingenious plot, engaging characters, tense flash points, pulsating score and occasional moments of humor", but taunted the English title "Money Heist" as bland. In a scathing review, Pauline Bock of the British magazine New Statesman questioned the global hype of the series, saying that it was "full of plot holes, clichéd slow-motions, corny love stories and gratuitous sex scenes", before continuing to add that "the music is pompous, the voice-over irritating, and it's terribly edited". John Doyle of The Globe and Mail praised parts 1 and 2 for the heist genre subversions; he also said that the series could be "deliciously melodramatic at times" with "outrageous twists and much passion" like a telenovela. Jennifer Keishin Armstrong of the BBC saw the series' true appeal in the interpersonal dramas emerging through the heist between "the beautiful robbers, their beautiful hostages, and the beautiful authorities trying to negotiate with them." David Hugendick of Die Zeit found the series "sometimes a bit sentimental, a little cartoonesque," and the drama sometimes too telenovela-like, but "all with a good sense for timing and spectacle."

The third part also received positive reviews, although they were slightly less so than those of its predecessors. On review aggregator website Rotten Tomatoes, it received an approval rating of 100% based on 12 reviews, with an average rating of 7/10. The site's critical consensus reads, "An audacious plan told in a non-linear fashion keeps the third installment moving as Money Heist refocuses on the relations between its beloved characters." While lauding the technical achievements, Javier Zurro of El Español described the third part as "first-class entertainment" that was unable to transcend its roots and lacked novelty. He felt unaffected by the internal drama between the characters and specifically, disliked Tokyo's narration for its hollowness. Alex Jiménez of Spanish newspaper ABC found part 3 mostly succeeding in its attempts to reinvent the show and stay fresh. Euan Ferguson of The Guardian recommended watching part 3, as "it's still a glorious Peaky Blinders, just with tapas and subtitles," while Pere Solà Gimferrer of La Vanguardia found that the number of plot holes in part 3 could only be endured with constant suspension of disbelief. Though entertained, Alfonso Rivadeneyra García of Peruvian newspaper El Comercio said the show does "what it does best: pretend to be the most intelligent boy in class when, in fact, it is only the cleverest."

The South Korean remake, Money Heist: Korea – Joint Economic Area, also enjoyed mixed-to-positive reviews from professional critics. On Rotten Tomatoes, it had an approval rating of 83% based on 12 reviews, with an average rating of 6.40/10. On Metacritic, the series has a weighted average score of 55 out of 100 based on 5 critics, indicating "mixed or average reviews". Joel Keller of Decider appreciated the performances of Yoo Ji-tae as the Professor, Jeon Jong-seo as Tokyo and Kim Yun-jin as Seon Woo-jin, writing, "each providing just the right tone to make the show less an over-the-top heist series and more of a layered treatise on the economic gap that everyone is suffering through at this stage in world history." Keller concluded, "If you're a fan of Money Heist, you'll like Money Heist: Korea – Joint Economic Area." Pierce Conran of the South China Morning Post rated the series with 3.5 out of 5 stars and wrote, "the purpose of Money Heist is to entertain rather than educate, and entertain it does with a story that hums along with all the thrills and twists required of a well-planned and inventively thwarted heist narrative." Daniel Hart of Ready Steady Cut graded the part 1 of season 1 with 3.5 stars out of 5 and wrote, "The production is impressive, the script is punchy, and the characters do well to represent their original counterparts." In conclusion Wilson wrote, "this remake is worth the time and investment, at least for the purely invested performances and production. Money Heist is back, so we shouldn't grumble." Kate Sánchez writing in Butwhythopodcast rated the part 1 8.5/10 and praised the cast writing, "Money Heist Korea is a phenomenal series because of its cast," Sánchez liked the chemistry between cast, writing, "chemistry that crackles between each and every cast member that pushes Money Heist Korea to be a dynamic show with uncertainty running through every scene." Concluding her review Sánchez wrote, "Ultimately Money Heist is expertly crafted to push tension and showcase action while also managing to investigate the way people interact with each other." S. Poorvaja of The Hindu wrote, "The first season of Money Heist: Korea - Joint Economic Area gets right in terms of its setting and characters, but here's hoping the makers push the envelope and take some risks in the second season."

=== Public response ===
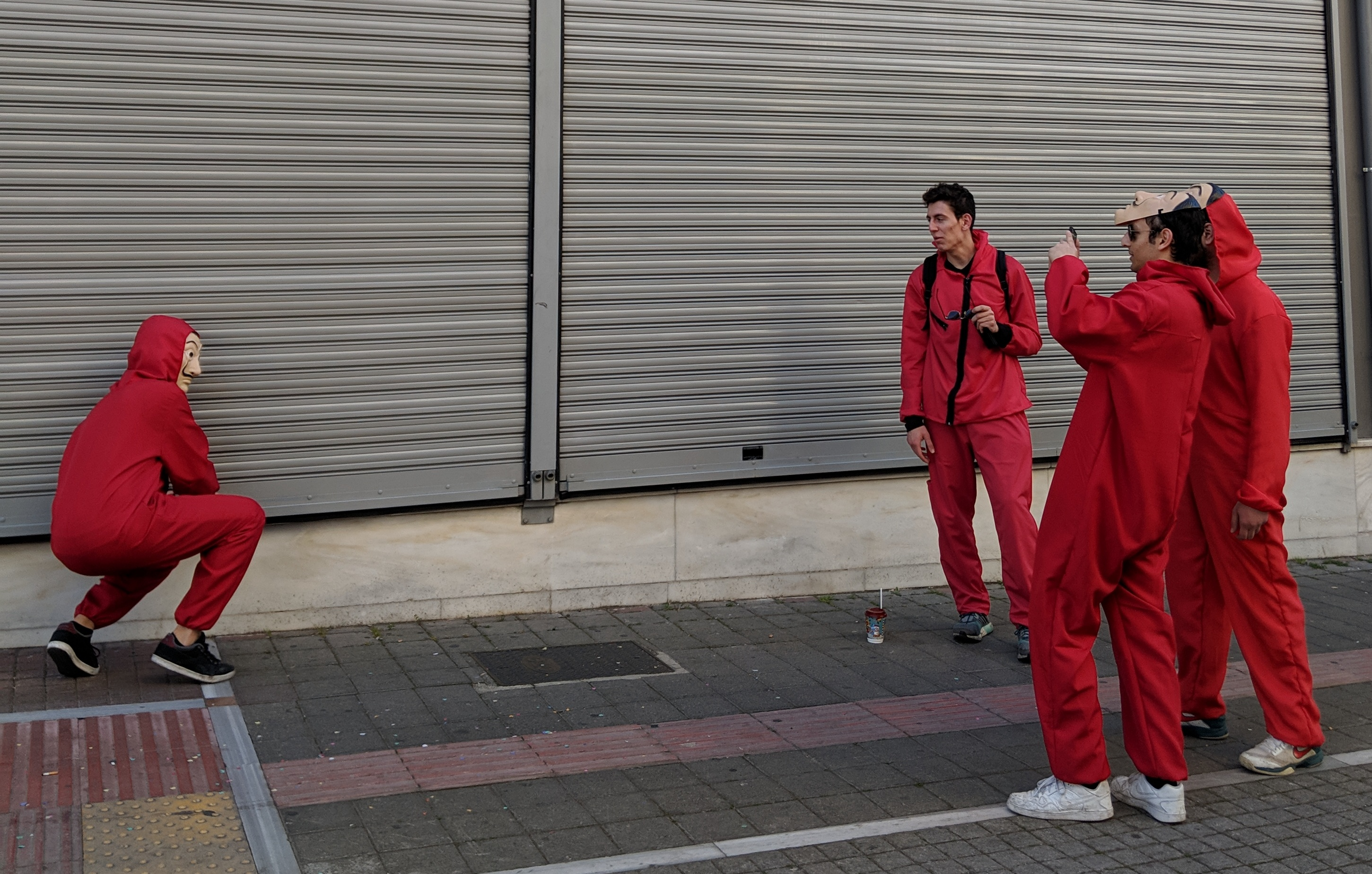
Cosplay in Patras, Greece, in 2019.

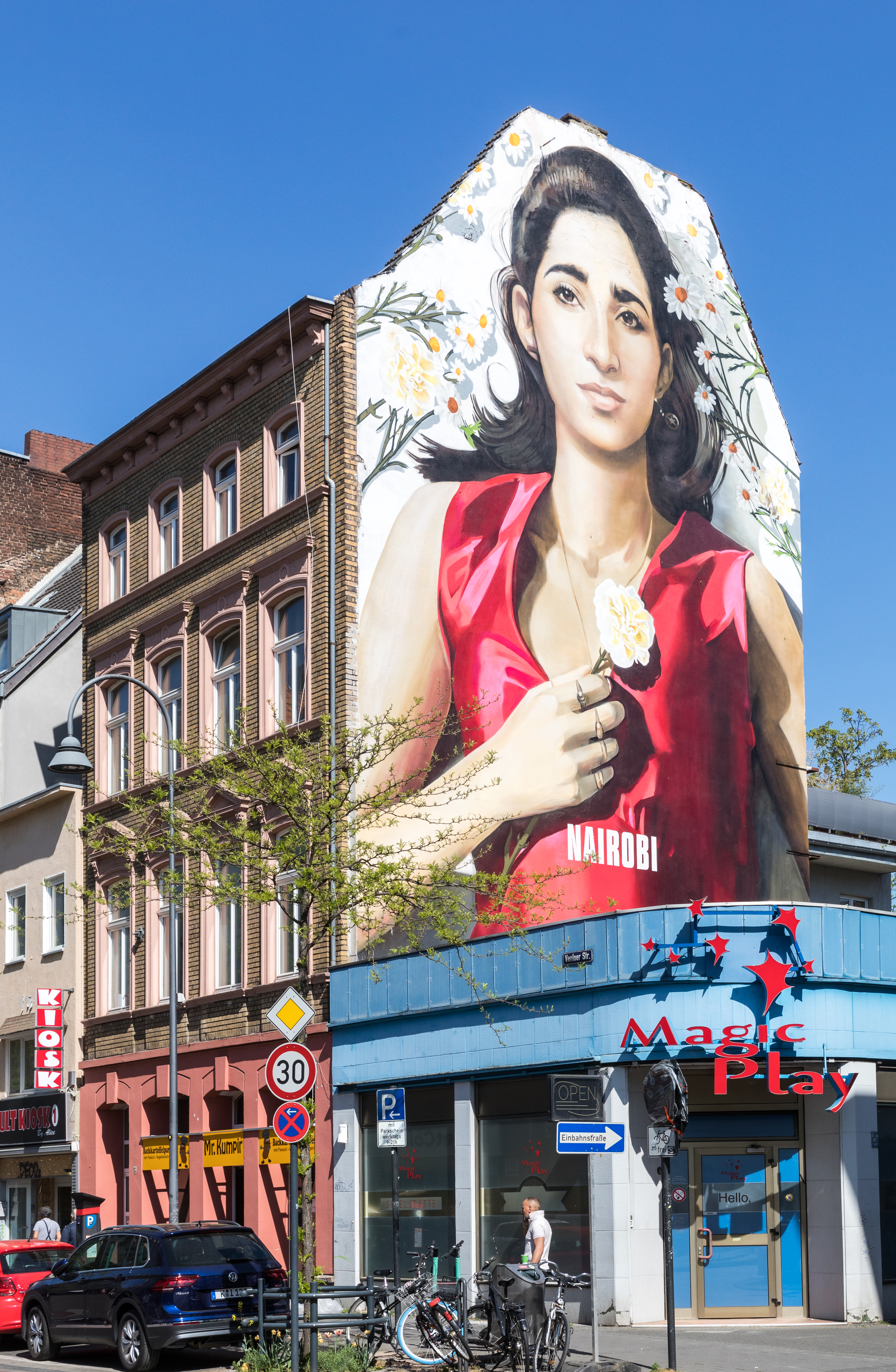
Nairobi mural in Ehrenfeld, Cologne.

After the move to Netflix, the series remained the most-followed series on Netflix for six consecutive weeks and became one of the most popular series on IMDb. It regularly trended on Twitter world-wide, largely because celebrities commented on it, such as football players Neymar and Marc Bartra, American singer Romeo Santos, and author Stephen King. While users flooded social networks with media of themselves wearing the robbers' outfit, the robbers' costumes were worn at the Rio Carnival, and Dalí icons were shown on huge banners in Saudi Arabia football stadiums. Real footage of these events would later be shown in part 3 as a tribute to the show's international success. The Musée Grévin in Paris added statues of the robbers to its wax museum in summer 2018. The show's iconography was used prominently by third parties for advertising, sports presentations, and in porn.

There have also been negative responses to the influence of the show. In numerous incidents, real heist men wore the show's red costumes and Dalì masks in their attacks or copied the fictional robbers' infiltration plans. The robbers' costumes were banned at the 2019 Limassol Carnival Festival as a security measure as a result. The series was used in an attack on YouTube, when hackers removed the most-played song in the platform's history, "Despacito", and left an image of the show instead. In unrelated reports, a journalist from Turkish TV channel AkitTV and an Ankaran politician have both warned against the show for supposedly encouraging terrorism and being "a dangerous symbol of rebellion".

Spanish newspaper El Mundo saw the public response as a reflection of the "climate of global disenchantment" where the robbers represent the "perfect antiheroes", and the New Statesman explained the show's resonance with international audiences as coming from the "social and economic tensions it depicts, and because of the utopian escape it offers." Viewer response was especially high in Mediterranean Europe and the Latin world, in particular Spain, Italy, France, Portugal, Brazil, Chile and Argentina, so Spanish as a common language did not appear to be a unifying reason for the show's success. Writer Javier Gómez Santander and actor Pedro Alonso (Berlin) rather argued that the Latin world used to feel at the periphery of global importance, but a new sentiment was coming that Spain could compete with the global players in terms of media production levels and give the rest of the world a voice. The series was one of two Spanish language TV series to be featured in TV Time's top 50 most followed TV shows ever, currently being the fifth most followed series on the platform.

=== Accolades ===
Year	Award	Category	Nominees	Result	Ref.
2017	19th Iris Awards	Best screenplay	Álex Pina, Esther Martínez Lobato, David Barrocal, Pablo Roa, Esther Morales, Fernando Sancristóbal, Javier Gómez Santander	Won	
2017	FesTVal	Best direction in fiction	Jesús Colmenar, Alejandro Bazzano, Miguel Ángel Vivas, Álex Rodrigo	Nominated	
2017	FesTVal	Best fiction (by critics)	Money Heist	Nominated	
2017	Fotogramas de Plata	Audience Award – Best Spanish Series	Money Heist	Won	
2017	Fotogramas de Plata	Best TV Actor	Pedro Alonso	Nominated	
2018	46th International Emmy Awards	Best drama series	Money Heist	Won	
2018	Iris Award	Best actress	Úrsula Corberó	Won	
2018	Iris Award	Best series	Money Heist	Nominated	
2018	MiM Series	Best direction	Jesús Colmenar, Alejandro Bazzano, Miguel Ángel Vivas, Álex Rodrigo	Won	
2018	Golden Nymph	Best drama TV series	Money Heist	Won	
2018	Spanish Actors Union	Best supporting television actor	Pedro Alonso	Won	
2018	Spanish Actors Union	Best supporting television actress	Alba Flores	Nominated	
2018	Spanish Actors Union	Best television actor	Álvaro Morte	Nominated	
2018	Spanish Actors Union	Best TV cast actor	Jaime Lorente	Nominated	
2018	Spanish Actors Union	Best stand-out actress	Esther Acebo	Nominated	
2018	Premios Fénix	Best series	Money Heist	Nominated	
2018	Festival de Luchon	Audience Choice Award	Money Heist	Won	
2018	Festival de Luchon	Jury Spanish Series Award	Money Heist	Won	
2018	Camille Awards	composer	Iván Martínez Lacámara	Nominated	
2018	Camille Awards	composer	Manel Santisteban	Nominated	
2018	Camille Awards	Production Company	Vancouver Media	Nominated	
2018	5th Feroz Awards	Best Drama Series	Money Heist	Nominated	
2018	5th Feroz Awards	Best Lead Actress in a Series	Úrsula Corberó	Nominated	
2018	5th Feroz Awards	Best Lead Actor in a Series	Álvaro Morte	Nominated	
2018	5th Feroz Awards	Best Supporting Actress in a Series	Alba Flores	Nominated	
2018	5th Feroz Awards	Best Supporting Actor in a Series	Paco Tous	Nominated	
2019	21st Iris Awards	Best actor	Álvaro Morte	Won	
2019	21st Iris Awards	Best actress	Alba Flores	Won	
2019	21st Iris Awards	Best direction	Jesús Colmenar, Álex Rodrigo, Koldo Serra, Javier Quintas	Won	
2019	21st Iris Awards	Best fiction	Money Heist	Won	
2019	21st Iris Awards	Best production	Cristina López Ferrar	Won	
2019	Spanish Actors Union	Lead Performance, Male	Álvaro Morte	Won	
2019	Spanish Actors Union	Lead Performance, Female	Alba Flores	Nominated	
2019	Spanish Actors Union	Supporting Performance, Male	Jaime Lorente	Nominated	
2020	7th Feroz Awards	Best drama series	Money Heist	Nominated	
2020	7th Feroz Awards	Best leading actor of a series	Álvaro Morte	Nominated	
2020	7th Feroz Awards	Best supporting actress in a series	Alba Flores	Nominated	
2020	Fotogramas de Plata	Audience Award – Best Spanish Series	Money Heist	Nominated	
2020	Fotogramas de Plata	Best TV Actor	Álvaro Morte	Nominated	
2020	Spanish Actors Union	Performance in a Minor Role, Male	Fernando Cayo	Won	
2020	Spanish Actors Union	Lead Performance, Female	Alba Flores	Nominated	
2020	7th Platino Awards	Best Miniseries or TV series	Money Heist	Won	
2020	7th Platino Awards	Best Male Performance in a Miniseries or TV series	Álvaro Morte	Won	
2020	7th Platino Awards	Best Female Performance in a Miniseries or TV series	Úrsula Corberó	Nominated	
2020	7th Platino Awards	Best Female Supporting Performance in a Miniseries or TV series	Alba Flores	Won	
2021	Forqué Awards	Best Fiction Series	Money Heist	Nominated	
2021	71st Fotogramas de Plata	Best Television Actress	Itziar Ituño	Nominated	
2022	12th Critics' Choice Television Awards	Best Foreign Language Series	Money Heist	Nominated	
2022	30th Actors and Actresses Union Awards	Best TV Actress in a Leading Role	Úrsula Corberó	Nominated	
2022	30th Actors and Actresses Union Awards	Best TV Actress in a Secondary Role	Belén Cuesta	Nominated	
2022	30th Actors and Actresses Union Awards	Best TV Actor in a Secondary Role	Fernando Cayo	Won	
2022	30th Actors and Actresses Union Awards	Best TV Actor in a Minor Role	Alberto Amarilla	Nominated	

== Video games ==
In November 2020, Netflix partnered with Tom Clancy's Rainbow Six Siege for an in-game Money Heist-themed event, where hostages on the Bank map, wore Money Heist outfits. Outfits for 2 in-game characters were purchasable and the music in the background during the heist, was Bella Ciao.

In June 2022, Netflix announced that a video game based on Money Heist was in development, centered around a new heist by the Professor and his team to a casino in Monaco, as part of a favor to an old friend of the Professor's. The game was being developed by Colombian studio Killasoft and was expected to be published by Netflix for mobile phones as part of the company's mobile gaming service, but was never released. A different game, Money Heist: Ultimate Choice, was released on 4 January 2024.
