= Money Heist: Korea – Joint Economic Area =

South Korean television series

- Hangul: 종이의 집: 공동경제구역
- Hanja: 종이의 집: 共同經濟區域
- Lit.: House of Paper: Joint Economic Area
- RR: Jongiui jip: gongdong gyeongje guyeok
- MR: Chongiŭi chip: kongdong kyŏngje kuyŏk
- Genre: Heist; Crime drama
- Based on: Money Heist by Álex Pina
- Developed by: Netflix
- Written by: Ryu Yong-jae; Kim Hwan-chae; Choe Sung-jun
- Directed by: Kim Hong-sun
- Starring: Yoo Ji-tae; Kim Yun-jin; Park Hae-soo; Jeon Jong-seo
- Composer: Kim Tae-seong
- Country of origin: South Korea
- Original language: Korean
- No. of episodes: 12

Production
- Camera setup: Multi camera
- Running time: 63–78 minutes
- Production companies: BH Entertainment; Zium Content

Original release
- Network: Netflix
- Release: June 24 – December 9, 2022

Related
- Money Heist

Money Heist: Korea – Joint Economic Area (Korean: 종이의 집: 공동경제구역) is a South Korean television series and second series in the Money Heist franchise, based on the original Spanish series. The Korean series directed by Kim Hong-sun and written by Ryu Yong-jae, is an original Netflix series, starring an ensemble cast led by Yoo Ji-tae, Kim Yun-jin, Park Hae-soo, and Jeon Jong-seo. It depicts a hostage crisis situation set in a unified Korean Peninsula, involving a genius strategist and people with different personalities and abilities. The first six episodes were released on June 24, 2022, on Netflix. The second part was released on December 9, 2022.

== Synopsis ==
The series follows the storyline and characters of the original Spanish series. "The Professor" (Yoo Ji-tae), a strategist criminal mastermind, plans to pull off a heist in the reunified Korean Peninsula. The operation involves strategists and desperados with different characteristics and abilities, who have to face unusual situations. Robbers overtake the mint of a unified Korea. With hostages trapped inside, the police must stop them, as well as the operation's shadowy mastermind.

== Cast ==
=== The gang ===
- Yoo Ji-tae as Professor / Park Sun-ho

The mastermind of a 4 trillion won heist. He is the boyfriend of police inspector Seon Woo-jin and the Korean version of the original Professor who is portrayed by Álvaro Morte.

- Park Hae-soo as Berlin / Song Jung-ho

A 41-year-old North Korean former prisoner of the Kaechon concentration camp, where he served 25 years' detention since age nine as a result of attempted defection. He tends to resort to violence and tries to use fear to threaten the hostages, unlike the Professor's intention to not harm anyone and is the Korean version of the original Berlin who is portrayed by Pedro Alonso.

- Jeon Jong-seo as Tokyo / Lee Hong-dan

A North Korean woman with military training who was wanted for committing armed robberies and murders of loan sharks (who extorted penniless North Korean defectors) before the Professor recruited her for the heist. She serves as the narrator of the series and is the Korean version of the original Tokyo who is portrayed by Úrsula Corberó.

- Lee Won-jong as Moscow / Oh Man-sik

An ex-convict, who raised his son Denver alone, after his wife left him. He was constantly in and out of prison prior to the heist and is the Korean version of the original Moscow who is portrayed by Paco Tous.

- Kim Ji-hoon as Denver / Oh Taek-su

Moscow's son and underground fighter, who later falls for Mi-seon, one of the hostages at the Mint and is the Korean version of the original Denver who is portrayed by Jaime Lorente.

- Jang Yoon-ju as Nairobi / Sim Young-mun

A con artist who was recruited by the Professor, she is the Korean version of the original Nairobi who is portrayed by Alba Flores.

- Lee Hyun-woo as Rio / Han Joseph

The "maknae" (the youngest person) of the heist group and skilled hacker. He is a medical school dropout and son of an affluent family and the Korean version of the original Rio who is portrayed by Miguel Herrán.

- Kim Ji-hun as Helsinki / Ko Myung-tae

Oslo's brother and former member of a gang in Yanbian, he is the Korean version of the original Helsinki who is portrayed by Darko Perić.

- Lee Kyu-ho as Oslo / Lee Sang-yeon

Helsinki's brother and former member of a gang in Yanbian, he is the Korean version of the original Oslo who is portrayed by Roberto García Ruiz.

=== Task Force ===
- Kim Yun-jin as Seon Woo-jin, a crisis negotiation team leader belonging to the National Police Agency in South Korea. She is based on Raquel Murillo, an inspector and negotiator with the Spanish National Police Corps portrayed by Itziar Ituño.
- Kim Sung-oh as Captain Cha Moo-hyuk, a former special agent from North Korea who was dispatched to handle the hostage crisis. He is based on Ángel Rubio, a deputy inspector with the Spanish National Police Corps who is Raquel's second-in-command, who he is portrayed by Fernando Soto.
- Park Soo-young as Yun Chang-su

JEA Police Chief

- Sun Woo-seong as Nam Dong-cheol

Gyeonggi Police Agency Sergeant

=== Hostages ===
- Park Myung-hoon as Cho Young-min

Director of the Mint Bureau. He only cares about his own safety and disregards the others' welfare. He has an affair with Mi-seon despite being married with two children. He is based on Arturo Román, the Director of the Royal Mint of Spain who he is portrayed by Enrique Arce.

- Lee Joo-bin as Stockholm / Yoon Mi-seon

An employee in charge of accounting at the Mint. She is Young-min's lover, and later falls for Denver. Based on the character of Mónica Gaztambide aka Stockholm who she is portrayed by Esther Acebo.

- Lee Si-woo as Anne Kim

A high school student and the daughter of the U.S. Ambassador, who came with her class for a field trip at the Mint. She is one of the hostages and is based on Alison Parker, the daughter of the British ambassador to Spain who she is portrayed by María Pedraza.

- Hong In as Hwang Hyun-ho

Deputy director of the Mint Bureau installed in JEA, a general economic zone on the Korean Peninsula.

- Gil Eun-seong as Park Chul-woo

A member of the North Korean military special operations unit who infiltrates the bandit-occupied Mint.

=== Others ===
- Lim Ji-yeon as Seoul

The leader of the mercenaries outside the mint to help the robbers.

- Lim Hyeong-guk as Jeon Yong-soo

A leader who came down from the North Korean for inter-Korean economic cooperation

- Jang Hyun-sung as Kim Sang-man

A politician who is the former husband of Woo-jin. He is quite similar to Raquel Murillo's ex-husband Alberto Vicuña, a forensic examiner with the Spanish National Police Corps, who he is portrayed by Miquel García Borda.

- Gil Eun-seong as Kim Chul-yoon

a former special agent from North Korea.

- Han Seo-jin as Kim Min-ah

Seon Woo-jin's and Kim Sang-man's daughter

- Yi Yong-nyeo as Park Pil-sun

Seon Woon-jin's mother

- Kim Jun as Nairobi's son

- Jeong Jae-seong as Marshall Kim

U.S. Ambassador to Korea and Anne Kim's father

- Lee Chang-hoon as Oh Jae-yoon

The chairman of Ohsung Group, a supporter of Kim Sang-man and a person at the pinnacle of fulfilling his desires through the establishment of an inter-Korean economic cooperation model

== Episodes ==
Series overview
Season	Episodes		Originally released
1	12	6	June 24, 2022
1	12	6	December 9, 2022

No. overall	No. in season	Title	Directed by	Written by	Original release date
Part 1
1	1	"Episode 1"	Kim Hong-sun	Ryu Yong-jae, Kim Hwan-chae, Choe Sung-jun	June 24, 2022
A female North Korean soldier, secretly a fan of South Korean K-pop boy band BTS, narrates her life before the re-unification of both North Korea and South Korea. The story begins in 2025 when the North-South border of the Korean peninsula opens to allow North Koreans and South Koreans to commute between both countries for work, as well as the South's investments in the North and the construction of the Joint-Economic Area (JEA) for economic growth of the two Koreas. The soldier, like many North Koreans, goes to the South to find work, but ends up turning to a life of crime, robbing and killing loan sharks who extorted many Northerners and poor Southerners, and becoming a nationwide fugitive. A year later, after her partner is killed, she is recruited by a man who introduced himself as the "Professor" to help commit a four trillion won money heist. She joins him and takes on the code name "Tokyo". Tokyo is also joined by former North Korean camp prisoner "Berlin", con artist "Nairobi", ex-convict "Moscow" and his son, underground fighter "Denver", skilled hacker "Rio", and brothers "Oslo" and "Helsinki" from a Yanbian gang. Together, the group goes to the Mint at JEA, where they hold the employees and visitors hostage and begin to print bank notes worth four trillion won. South Korean crisis negotiation team leader Seon Woo-jin and North Korean captain Cha Moo-hyuk are later ordered to lead a group of police officers from both Koreas to monitor and diffuse the hostage situation. Unknown to Woo-jin however, the Professor is her current boyfriend and cafe owner Park Sun-ho.
2	2	"Episode 2"	Kim Hong-sun	Ryu Yong-jae, Kim Hwan-chae, Choe Sung-jun	June 24, 2022
Not knowing the Professor's identity, Woo-jin negotiates with the Professor (who is giving orders in a secret room in his cafe) to ensure the safety of the hostages; the group (except Berlin) has promised to not hurt the hostages as long as they follow orders. Among the hostages are the Mint's director Cho Young-min, Young-min's lover and employee Yoon Mi-seon, and high school student Anne Kim, who is the daughter of the US Ambassador and part of a school field trip. As several employees of the Mint are ordered by their captors to print the notes, Young-min, who is desperate to get out, asks Mi-seon to help him take his smartwatch from his office to contact the police, since the hostages' phones were confiscated. Mi-seon pretends to be pregnant in accordance to Young-min's lies and Denver takes her away to another room, where she sneaks out and retrieves the watch with Anne's help. After a few attempts to contact the outside world, the smartwatch is discovered and Berlin, despite the Professor's orders, decides to punish Young-min by having his lover Mi-seon executed. Denver takes her to the bathroom and shoots her.
3	3	"Episode 3"	Kim Hong-sun	Ryu Yong-jae, Kim Hwan-chae, Choe Sung-jun	June 24, 2022
Tokyo discovers that Denver shot Mi-seon in the leg, and decides to help him hide her in an underground vault, where they apply first aid. Tokyo wants to have Berlin removed from his leadership role due to his violence and unpredictability, while Denver tends to Mi-seon. Young-min struggles with his sadness over Mi-seon's "death" while enduring the other hostages' condemnation for putting Mi-seon in danger in his place out of selfishness; the North Korean employees threaten to kill him if he tries to put the others in danger again. Later, Tokyo enlists Nairobi and Rio's help to subdue Helsinki and Oslo and they confront Berlin at the office, where the heist members get into a heated argument over Berlin's disobedience. During the argument, Moscow is shocked and distraught to hear that Denver killed Mi-seon, and without knowing the full truth, he recklessly exits the Mint to surrender in his son's place, willing to take the fall for Mi-seon's "murder". Denver manages to catch up and stop him, revealing that Mi-seon is alive. As there are snipers stationed outside the Mint aiming their guns at the two, Berlin sends the team and a few hostages to escort Moscow and Denver back inside while armed. Young-min tries to once again threaten Tokyo and the others to release him. Mistaking Young-min as the captor, Woo-jin gives the order for the snipers to shoot Young-min.
4	4	"Episode 4"	Kim Hong-sun	Ryu Yong-jae, Kim Hwan-chae, Choe Sung-jun	June 24, 2022
Young-min is shot in the chest and barely survives; he is brought back inside the Mint to be given first aid, but there's little the robbers can do. The police recognise Young-min and decide to negotiate with the Professor to send medics inside the Mint to treat and save Young-min. Moo-hyuk pretends to be a nurse and enters the Mint with two nurses and a surgeon. Berlin, tipped off by the Professor, confronts Moo-hyuk. Moo-hyuk states that he's a policeman sent to ensure the medics' safety. In reality, an ambush team (wearing the same attire and mask as the heist team) is secretly infiltrating the Mint while Moo-hyuk and the medics help buy them time to enter the compound. The Professor sees through this and orders the hostages and heist team to switch to another mask to differentiate themselves from the ambush team; this leads to Woo-jin ordering the team to abort their mission and retreat. Before they do, however, Rio manages to install eavesdropping software on Moo-hyuk's phone. Denver and Tokyo steal the medics' medical supplies to allow Rio, a medical school dropout, to operate on Mi-seon. Berlin detains Tokyo and Rio, and tries to kill Mi-seon; Denver stands in front of Berlin's gun, showing his growing affection for Mi-seon. Nairobi subdues Berlin, who is later tied up as punishment for defying the Professor's orders. Mi-seon, now largely improved from her injuries, rejoins the hostages, who rejoice at the truth of her survival as Nairobi and Tokyo take charge and show more lenience to the hostages under their supervision.
5	5	"Episode 5"	Kim Hong-sun	Ryu Yong-jae, Kim Hwan-chae, Choe Sung-jun	June 24, 2022
Park Chul-woo, a secret agent from the ambush team earlier on, blends in as a hostage after he fails to escape with the other agents on time. He gets into contact with Young-min, Mi-seon and Anne, devising a plan to save the hostages and subdue the captors. Woo-jin gradually realises the Professor is outside the Mint, and finds evidence that a used car sent to the junkyard was used by the Professor on the first day the hostage situation occurred. As the Professor narrowly escapes police pursuit to take away the car and destroy evidence, Chul-woo and Young-min abduct Denver to torture and interrogate him on the Professor's identity and whereabouts. Chul-woo and Anne subsequently fake a situation of a fire breaking out as a distraction, while Berlin attacks Rio to escape his bonds. Young-min, thinking that Denver and Mi-seon were in a relationship, beats up Denver, but Mi-seon, who seems to have fallen for Denver, stops him and tells Denver about Chul-woo's plan. Just as Chul-woo is about to shoot Tokyo, Denver alerts her. A gunshot is heard from the distance. Outside, Woo-jin opens up to the Professor more as the latter begins to feel guilty for his secret identity.
6	6	"Episode 6"	Kim Hong-sun	Ryu Yong-jae, Kim Hwan-chae, Choe Sung-jun	June 24, 2022
Hearing the gunshot, the police assume Chul-woo is dead. Woo-jin plans to use media attention to turn public opinion against the heist team. Berlin, who reveals his real name as Song Jung-ho, gathers the hostages and allows Woo-jin to enter the Mint with a cameraman to verify the hostages' safety and assure their loved ones. Woo-jin reveals to the public that the "hostage" Chul-woo is missing and assumed dead, lying that he was a recently hired security guard, something that Anne and Young-min confirm. She claims the heist team broke their promise to not hurt the hostages, and demands the students' release, which stirs outrage against the heist team. However, Berlin reveals that Chul-woo is still alive, as he had been wearing a vest when he was shot. Berlin accuses the police of using Chul-woo to endanger the hostages' safety, as well as only intending to save Anne (due to her father's political background), not the other hostages. Berlin declares this as proof that the heist team only wants money and never to harm the hostages, which further cements public anger against the police and government; Woo-jin leaves the Mint in defeat. As the heist team nears the end of their mission, Denver bids Mi-seon an early farewell; they have sex. On the outside, Moo-hyuk resigns, while a distressed Woo-jin goes on a date with the Professor, who realizes his love for Woo-jin. This date is cut short when Woo-jin finds a secret message left by Anne. As the Professor returns to his café, he comes face-to-face with Moo-hyuk, who earlier suspected him.
Part 2
7	7	"Episode 7"	Kim Hong-sun	Ryu Yong-jae, Kim Hwan-chae, Choe Sung-jun	December 9, 2022
Moo-hyuk probes the Professor. He steals a handcraft blade to check the Professor's fingerprints. The Professor instructs Rio to hack into Moo-hyuk's phone to frame him as a mole. Kim Sangman, a politician, broadcasts a message to the robbers that he would speak to the President to grant immunity to any robber that would bring an end to the heist. An unidentified member of the heist team contacts Sangman, and Sangman provides a condition that the US ambassador's daughter, Anne Kim, must first be killed. Anne is the only factor stopping the police from using brute force to enter the Mint. Anne is lured to the vault with a promise of escape. Woo-jin discovers Sangman's plan, and informs the Professor. The heist team frantically searches for Anne, and discover a bomb in the vault. The bomb explodes, but Anne is safe. She had not entered the vault, as she did not wish to escape alone. Moo-hyuk retrieves the results on the handcraft blade, and confirms his suspicions. The police attempt to arrest him for leaking official secrets, but he resists arrest and runs away to tell Woo-jin that Sun-ho, her boyfriend, is the Professor. Rio is blocking his phone calls, so Woo-jin never receives the message. The Professor confronts Moo-hyuk and after a struggle, knocks him out with a needle. The Professor stows him in the trunk of a car, however Woo-jin's mother witnesses the event, and runs to the phone to tell her daughter. Conscious that there can be no loose ends, the Professor enters the house with the intention of killing Woo-jin's mother. Upon entering, he overhears her call with her daughter, in which she cannot remember why she has called. The Professor realises that she suffers from dementia. He leaves the house without killing her. Woo-jin, upon hearing of Moo-hyuk's supposed betrayal, visits Sun-ho. She points a gun at him and demands he show her upstairs in his café. When they enter the room, it appears to be an ordinary storage room. Woo-jin apologises, but Sun-ho tells her to leave and ends the relationship. After realizing that the robbers are printing money, Woo-jin orders the Mint's electricity to be cut off.
8	8	"Episode 8"	Kim Hong-sun	Ryu Yong-jae, Kim Hwan-chae, Choe Sung-jun	December 9, 2022
Oslo is struck down by the hostages, who set their escape plan into motion as the lights go out in the Mint. The hostages head to the loading bay, but find the exit blocked by explosives. The robbers reach and subdue the hostages just as the police breach their way inside. The heist team fends the police off and block the entrance while the hostages head to the rooftop for rescue. Meanwhile, Park Chul-woo finds and destroys the heist team's communication equipment, and secures a vial of Berlin's medicine. Although the heist team reaches the rooftop and stops the hostages, 29 of them manage to escape. Helsinki finds Oslo and Rio tries to reanimate him, but it is too late. The remaining hostages start acting defiant towards the group. Without his medicine, a deranged Berlin is hell-bent on finding the traitor, who is revealed to be Nairobi. She called Sangman after seeing her son on television. Convinced that Tokyo is the traitor, Berlin restrains her, while a grieving Helsinki sides with Berlin and knocks Rio out. Rio confesses to be the traitor, but Berlin is sure that he is only doing so to protect Tokyo and concludes that she is the traitor. He pushes her out of the Mint tied up on a cart, to be arrested. Park Chul-woo gives Woo-jin the medicine he retrieved. Deducing that one of the robbers has a terminal disease, she has deliveries of the medicine tracked down to the resort where the robbers planned their heist. The Professor and Berlin are revealed to be brothers.
9	9	"Episode 9"	Kim Hong-sun	Ryu Yong-jae, Kim Hwan-chae, Choe Sung-jun	December 9, 2022
The police find fake evidence of political motives, planted by the Professor, at the robbers' hideout, who then detonates a bomb to destroy the "evidence" before forensic examination. Woo-jin questions Tokyo, who claims a crazed Berlin betrayed her. After Tokyo refuses to testify against the heist team, she is sent into a detention center. It is revealed that Berlin and Tokyo planned the episode at the Mint's doors so that they could narrow out who the actual traitor is. Nairobi confesses to be the traitor; Sangman is blackmailing her using her child. The team fakes their conflict in order to send Tokyo outside to communicate with the Professor. Tokyo is saved by Berlin's henchman, Seoul, while en route to the detention center. Tokyo and Seoul rescue Nairobi's child. Sangman relieves Woo-jin and instates the South Korea Counter Terrorism Unit in charge of the situation, due to the robbers' supposed political motives. At the Mint's doors, Berlin demands to meet Jeon Yong-soo, who was the warden at his concentration camp. Yong-Soo volunteers to talk with Berlin to stall for time as the team under Sangman plans to raid The Mint at all cost. As Yong-soo and Berlin talk, Yong-soo tries to portray as Berlin as an enraged killer who raped and killed his daughter, but a live broadcast reveals that she is alive and well, as she is actually Seoul. She then accuses Yong-soo of abusing her. Embarrassed and humiliated, Yong-soo leaves.
10	10	"Episode 10"	Kim Hong-sun	Ryu Yong-jae, Kim Hwan-chae, Choe Sung-jun	December 9, 2022
As the robbers prepare for the return of Tokyo into the Mint, Berlin offers the hostages a choice between freedom, or money, if they decide to help the heist team. A few hostages, including Young-min, Mi-seon, and Anne, decide to stay. After finding out about Denver's love affair with Mi-seon, Moscow reveals to him that his mother was also a hostage that fell in love with Moscow, but left him after giving birth to Denver. A devastated Denver urges Mi-seon to forget about him and leave the Mint. Woo-jin passes out from exhaustion, but Sun-ho takes her to the hospital. After recovering, she visits him, and they reconcile. While planning their future, Sun-ho reveals that his father suffered from dementia, just like Woo-jin's mother. On her way back, Woo-jin has an epiphany and goes to her mother, who confirms that she saw Sun-ho earlier that week. At the JEA Police Headquarters, Woo-jin retrieves the DNA result that Moo-hyuk requested and realizes that Sun-ho is the Professor. The group releases the hostages that chose freedom and uses them as cover while Tokyo races on a motorbike back to the Mint. Amid the chaos, Mi-seon runs back to the Mint, and Moscow is shot by a sniper, though he hides in the bathroom before anyone notices. A restrained Moo-hyuk frees himself and escapes the Professor's hideout, but the group quickly gives pursuit. Cornered, he throws himself in front of a car and falls on the road unconscious.
11	11	"Episode 11"	Kim Hong-sun	Ryu Yong-jae, Kim Hwan-chae, Choe Sung-jun	December 9, 2022
Moscow is injured due to being shot by the police snipers, which puts the robbers on edge as the escape tunnel is not finished. Kim Sangman moves the summit up a day earlier than planned, cutting the robbers' deadline to carry out their plan short. Rio questions the motives of the Professor and Berlin before being told by Tokyo that she believes in the Professor. She then tells Rio that she came back not only for the money, but that she had another reason to return, which makes Rio uncomfortable. He decides to go to the tunnel to help Denver, who has taken over digging duty. Together they finish digging the tunnel. Moscow talks with Mi-seon and finally accepts their relationship. Dying, Moscow asks Denver to take care of Mi-seon before telling the team his name with his last breath. His passing makes the mood in The Mint solemn as the remaining hostages print the last of the money. Woo-jin, having finally deduced that the Professor is her boyfriend, lures him to the hospital where Moo-hyuk is being treated. She plants a GPS tracker on him and plans to catch him as he returns to the hideout. The plan fails, as Seoul notices that Woo-jin's car is tailing the Professor. Woo-jin is suspended for internal questioning because of her relationship with the Professor. She tracks down the Professor's hideout by herself and holds him at gunpoint. He explains his reasons for the heist before subduing her.
12	12	"Episode 12"	Kim Hong-sun	Ryu Yong-jae, Kim Hwan-chae, Choe Sung-jun	December 9, 2022
The police breach the Mint. Denver fights Chul-woo and almost dies before Mi-seon shoots Chul-woo in the elbow. The heist team, now joined by Mi-seon, stall the police long enough to escape to the tunnel inside the Mint's vault. Woo-jin escapes her restraints and informs the task force of the hideout's location. The police, under orders from Sangman, capture her. The heist team's bomb malfunctions, preventing the team from closing the escape tunnel behind them. Berlin calls the Professor to say his final words as he intends to stall the pursuing police alone. Seoul returns to save him. They share a wish of staying together as Seoul shoots the bomb. Distraught over Berlin's supposed death, and with their planned escape route cornered, the Professor contemplates surrender. He then remembers the last remaining open tunnel linking North and South Korea. The police discover bombs in manhole covers in the tunnels around Peace Square. Sangman orders the police to surround the square to prevent the heist team from escaping. Moo-hyuk realises that Sangman does not intend to protect the innocent civilians from the explosions and resigns in anger. The bombs turn out to be small detonation charges, releasing balloon pigs. The balloons pop open; they are filled with the Professor's share of the money, scattering millions everywhere. Moo-hyuk frees Woo-jin from police custody so that she can chase after the heist team. The robbers pack their money onto a train to Russia. They hear from Berlin and Seoul, who have survived, and rejoice. As the train is leaving, and the Professor is stepping on, Woo-jin reaches him. Unable to bring herself to shoot him, she lets him go. A year later, Woo-jin is told by an international law firm that they will defend her in the investigation against her, and she realises that the Professor is helping her. She looks for the postcard that he gave her. Finding it, she travels to Kherson, Ukraine. She reunites with him, who asks her if she wants to join the heist of the century. In a mid-credits scene, Young-min, who has been kicked out by his wife, is packing his belongings in a moving truck. He rejects a box that he does not recognize, and when he leaves, the box is revealed to be full of cash, sent by the Professor.

== Production ==
=== Development ===
In June 2020, it was reported that BH Entertainment was planning for a remake of Money Heist co-producing it with Zium Content. They were in talks with Netflix, and it was in the development stage. On December 1, it was reported that a Korean remake of the series has been confirmed by Netflix with Kim Hong-sun as director and Ryu Yong-jae as script writer. BH Entertainment is in charge of production, with the series having 12 episodes.

=== Casting ===
On March 31, the casting line-up was confirmed by Netflix. After finalising the cast, the story and characters were formulated. The focus was to keep the narrative of the original and the attributes of the characters alive. Lim Ji-yeon joined the cast in April 2021. Lee Hyun-woo replaced Park Jung-woo due to date conflicts with the series Fly High Butterfly. The Korean cast was compared by drawing the similarities and differences among the original and the adaptation.

=== Filming ===
Filming was suspended on July 7, 2021, to accommodate guidelines intended to limit the spread of COVID-19.

On January 17, 2022, Netflix revealed the English title of the series: Money Heist: Korea – Joint Economic Area.

On April 29, 2022, it was announced that Money Heist: Korea – Joint Economic Area would be released on June 24, 2022.

On May 20, 2022, the official teaser was released.

== Reception ==
=== Critical response ===
On the review aggregator website Rotten Tomatoes, 71% of 17 critics' reviews are positive, with an average rating of 6.8/10. The website's consensus reads: "This Korean remake of Money Heist pilfers from the original to the point of holding no surprises for established fans, but the execution is slick and blueprint rock-solid." Metacritic, which uses a weighted average, assigned the series a score of 56 out of 100, based on 6 critics, indicating "mixed or average" reviews.

Joel Keller of Decider appreciated the performances of Yoo Ji-tae as the Professor, Jeon Jong-seo as Tokyo and Kim Yun-jin as Seon Woo-jin, writing, "each providing just the right tone to make the show less an over-the-top heist series and more of a layered treatise on the economic gap that everyone is suffering through at this stage in world history." Keller concluded, "If you're a fan of Money Heist, you'll like Money Heist: Korea – Joint Economic Area." Pierce Conran of the South China Morning Post rated the series with 3.5 out of 5 stars and wrote, "the purpose of Money Heist is to entertain rather than educate, and entertain it does with a story that hums along with all the thrills and twists required of a well-planned and inventively thwarted heist narrative."

S. Poorvaja of The Hindu wrote, "The first season of Money Heist: Korea - Joint Economic Area gets right in terms of its setting and characters, but here's hoping the makers push the envelope and take some risks in the second season."

=== Viewership ===
Money Heist: Korea – Joint Economic Area featuring in Global Top 10 weekly list of the most-watched international Netflix TV shows, topped the list with 33,740,000 viewing hours in the week from June 20 to June 26 and with 49,000,000 viewing hours in the week from June 27 to July 3. In the week July 4 to July 10 it was at 3rd place with 15,630,000 viewing hours. Additionally it ranked first in the Top-10 list of 51 countries.
