= Money Heist: The Phenomenon =

2020 documentary film by Luis Alfaro and Pablo Lejarreta

- Promotional poster
- Spanish: La casa de papel: El Fenómeno
- Directed by: Luis Alfaro; Pablo Lejarreta
- Written by: Pablo Lejarreta; Javier Gómez Santander
- Distributed by: Netflix
- Release date: April 3, 2020 (Spain)
- Running time: 57 minutes
- Country: Spain
- Language: Spanish

Money Heist: The Phenomenon (Spanish: La casa de papel: El Fenómeno, "The House of Paper: The Phenomenon") is a 2020 Spanish behind-the-scenes documentary film directed by Luis Alfaro and Pablo Lejarreta, and written by Lejarreta and Javier Gómez Santander. It takes a look at the global success of the Spanish TV series Money Heist (also known in Spanish as La Casa de Papel).

== Premise ==
Money Heist: The Phenomenon looks at how Money Heist became a global phenomenon, focusing on its unexpected rise in popularity, its Netflix acquisition, and its impact on culture across the world. It breaks down the production of the series, and includes interviews with the creators, cast and crew of the show.

== Cast ==
- Álex Pina: the director of the show.
- Jesús Colmenar: one of the show producers.
- Úrsula Corberó: the actress who portrays Tokyo.
- Álvaro Morte: the actor who portrays The Professor.
- Pedro Alonso: the actor who portrays Berlin.
- Alba Flores: the actress who portrays Nairobi.
- Miguel Herrán: the actor who portrays Rio.
- Jaime Lorente: the actor who portrays Denver.
- Itziar Ituño: the actress who portrays Raquel Murillo a.k.a. Lisbon.
- Esther Acebo: the actress who portrays Monica Gaztambide a.k.a. Stockholm.

== Release ==
Money Heist: The Phenomenon was released on April 3, 2020 on Netflix.
