= List of Money Heist episodes =

Money Heist (Spanish: La casa de papel, transl. The House of Paper) is a Spanish television series created by Álex Pina. The first season, consisting of two parts, premiered on 2 May 2017, on Spanish network Antena 3. The TV show portrays heists on the Royal Mint of Spain and the Bank of Spain by a group of code-named robbers, as their battle with hostages on the inside, and the police on the outside.

In late 2017, Netflix acquired the global streaming rights for the series, and re-cut the original 15 episodes into 22. Netflix officially renewed the series for a third part in 2018, which premiered on 19 July 2019. A fourth part was released on 3 April 2020. A documentary involving the producers and cast premiered on Netflix the same day, titled Money Heist: The Phenomenon. In July 2020, Netflix renewed the show for a fifth and final part, which were released in two five-episode volumes on 3 September and 3 December 2021, respectively. Similar to Money Heist: The Phenomenon, a two-part documentary involving the producers and cast premiered on Netflix the same day, titled Money Heist: From Tokyo to Berlin.

During the course of the series, 41 episodes of Money Heist (Note: Part 1 was re-cut and released as 13 episodes on 20 December 2017 on Netflix, and Part 2 was re-cut and released as 9 episodes on 6 April 2018 on Netflix. See Money Heist § Netflix acquisition.) were released over five parts, between 2 May 2017 and 3 December 2021. (Note: Some publications refer to "part" as "season.")

== Series overview ==
Overview of Money Heist seasons
Part	Season	Episodes		Originally released		
Part	Season	Episodes		First released	Last released	Network
1	1	9		2 May 2017	27 June 2017	Antena 3
2	1	6		16 October 2017	23 November 2017	Antena 3
3	2	8		19 July 2019		Netflix
4	2	8		3 April 2020		Netflix
5	3	10	5	3 September 2021		Netflix
5	3	10	5	3 December 2021		Netflix

== Episodes ==
=== Part 1 (2017) ===
Money Heist, part 1 episodes
No. overall	No. in part	Title	Directed by	Written by	Original release date	Spain viewers (millions)
1	1	"Efectuar lo acordado" "Do as Planned"	Jesús Colmenar	Álex Pina and Esther Martínez Lobato	2 May 2017	4.09
In the aftermath of a failed bank robbery by a woman named "Tokyo," a man called "the Professor" saves her from being caught by the police and proposes a heist of drastic proportions. After a brief outline of the planned heist, the Professor artfully guides a group of robbers: Tokyo, Rio, Berlin, Nairobi, Denver, Moscow, Oslo, and Helsinki to invade the Royal Mint of Spain in red jumpsuits and Salvador Dalí masks and take hold of 67 hostages, as part of their plan to print and escape with €2.4 billion. The police investigator Raquel Murillo is put in charge of the case, but she is unaware that the mastermind behind the heist is closer than she could ever have imagined.
2	2	"Imprudencias letales" "Lethal Negligence"	Miguel Ángel Vivas	Álex Pina, Esther Martínez Lobato, Javier Gómez Santander, Pablo Roa, Fernando Sancristóbal and David Barrocal	9 May 2017	3.04
The robbers begin to print the money while Arturo Román, one of the hostages, starts making escape plans, assisted by his secretary and mistress Mónica Gaztambide, who is pregnant with his child. She is caught with a concealed cell phone and Berlin orders Denver to kill her. Meanwhile, Rio makes a mistake that leads to his and Tokyo's identities being discovered by the police.
3	3	"Errar al disparar" "Misfire"	Álex Rodrigo	Álex Pina, Esther Martínez Lobato and David Barrocal	16 May 2017	2.64
Believing that Denver executed Mónica under Berlin's orders, Moscow, Denver's father, is devastated and attempts to turn himself in but is dissuaded by his son. In the meantime, Raquel's relationship with her new friend Salva becomes more intimate, totally oblivious to the fact that it is a pseudonym assumed by the Professor.
4	4	"Caballo de Troya" "Trojan Horse"	Alejandro Bazzano	Álex Pina, Esther Martínez Lobato, Javier Gómez Santander, Pablo Roa, Fernando Sancristóbal and David Barrocal	23 May 2017	2.65
Raquel sends her police partner Ángel Rubio into the Mint undercover with a medical team that is allowed to treat Arturo, who was mistakenly shot by the police. However, the Professor sees through her move and inserts a bug in Ángel's glasses.
5	5	"El día de la marmota" "Groundhog Day"	Jesús Colmenar	Álex Pina, Esther Martínez Lobato, Javier Gómez Santander, Pablo Roa, Fernando Sancristóbal and David Barrocal	30 May 2017	2.36
The Professor runs ahead of the police to get rid of an important piece of evidence that can endanger his plans, their fingerprints in a car at a scrap yard that Helsinki neglected to destroy. Meanwhile, Denver treats Mónica in a secret location after he shot her leg to fake her execution, and they end up becoming closer.
6	6	"La cálida Guerra Fría" "The Hot Cold War"	Miguel Ángel Vivas	Álex Pina, Esther Martínez Lobato, Javier Gómez Santander and Fernando Sancristóbal	6 June 2017	2.47
As the Professor rushes out of the scrap yard, a man sees him. The Professor threatens to kill the man's family if the facial composite of his description looks like him. Berlin discovers that Denver did not kill Mónica as ordered and believing that his identity was exposed because of him, comes close to executing him for his disobedience.
7	7	"Refrigerada inestabilidad" "Cool Instability"	Álex Rodrigo	Álex Pina, Esther Martínez Lobato, Pablo Roa and Esther Morales	13 June 2017	2.42
The robbers initiate a plan to use the hostages to stall the police and gain more time, but Raquel takes the chance to reveal a secret that Berlin has kept from the others—he only has a few months left to live due to a terminal illness. She also makes an attempt to convince Rio to surrender.
8	8	"Tú lo has buscado" "You Asked for It"	Alejandro Bazzano	Álex Pina, Esther Martínez Lobato, Javier Gómez Santander, Pablo Roa and Fernando Sancristóbal	20 June 2017	2.07
Raquel loses her trust in Ángel, who is unaware of the bug the robbers planted in his glasses. Arturo prepares another plan to escape, but becomes devastated upon discovering Mónica and Denver's affair. Ángel, who is taken off the case, is in a coma after a car accident while drunk. He had discovered the Professor's identity through fingerprints taken from his cider factory, a front for his hideout.
9	9	"El que la sigue la consigue" "Whoever Keeps Trying It, Gets It"	Jesús Colmenar	Álex Pina, Esther Martínez Lobato, Javier Gómez Santander, Pablo Roa, Fernando Sancristóbal and Esther Morales	27 June 2017	2.19
Thanks to Arturo's plan, 17 hostages manage to escape, seriously injuring Oslo in the process. Before his car accident, Ángel had left a voice message on Raquel's landline explaining that Salva was the one behind the heist. Raquel's mother, who has Alzheimer's disease, listens to Ángel's message, writes it down, and tries calling Raquel's phone. When Raquel does not answer, she calls Salva for him to pass along the message. The Professor believes he has no choice but to kill Raquel's mother. He goes to her home and poisons her coffee, but cannot go through with it and knocks the cup out of her hand. When she thinks it was her fault, he realizes that she has Alzheimer's disease and simply deletes the message and takes her note. Later, Raquel brings Salva along to Toledo and finds the robbers' villa, where they planned the heist.

=== Part 2 (2017) ===
Money Heist, part 2 episodes
No. overall	No. in part	Title	Directed by	Written by	Original release date	Spain viewers (millions)
10	1	"Se acabaron las máscaras" "Masked No Longer"	Álex Rodrigo	Álex Pina, Esther Martínez Lobato, Javier Gómez Santander, Pablo Roa, Fernando Sancristóbal and Esther Morales	16 October 2017	1.99
A team of police are brought to the discovered villa and search through "evidence" planted by the Professor earlier. Raquel's ex-husband Alberto is called in to lead the forensics examination, and finds burned evidence about the Professor in the chimney. In the Mint, Helsinki decides to euthanise his cousin Oslo, which he does so tearfully. Salva rides back to Madrid with Alberto and provokes him into a fight, knocking him out and erasing the evidence. When Alberto awakes, he arrests the Professor and brings him to jail. The Professor uses the bathroom at the prison and beats himself up to make it look like Alberto was the aggressor. He calls Raquel, who helps release him. Meanwhile, the robbers start losing hope after many hours without news from the Professor, and Tokyo begins a mutiny after becoming restless.
11	2	"La cabeza del plan" "The Head of the Plan"	Alejandro Bazzano	Álex Pina, Esther Martínez Lobato, Javier Gómez Santander, Pablo Roa, Fernando Sancristóbal, Esther Morales and David Barrocal	23 October 2017	1.73
Berlin exacts revenge on Tokyo for her mutiny, in which she played Russian roulette with him — he ties her to a table and rolls her out the front door to the police. Rio wants revenge. Tokyo fakes an injury to buy time, the Professor's number one rule after being captured. During interrogation, she comes face to face with Raquel, who wants the answer to one burning question, “Who is the Professor?”
12	3	"Cuestión de eficacia" "A Matter of Efficiency"	Javier Quintas	Álex Pina, Esther Martínez Lobato, Javier Gómez Santander, Pablo Roa, Fernando Sancristóbal, Esther Morales and David Barrocal	2 November 2017	1.57
By the Professor's promise that he will free Tokyo from the police, Rio rejoins the robbers and helps them stop Arturo's latest escape plan. Meanwhile, Raquel sets a trap for the Professor by creating a hoax that Ángel has awakened from his coma, in hopes it will lure him to the hospital to finish him off before he can identify the Professor. The Professor, skeptical of the announcement, posts a fake casting call for clowns at the hospital and dresses up like one, blending in with the crowd while confirming the hoax. Later, while Salva meets with Raquel at a cafe, she sees an orange hair from his clown wig on his jacket. She finally realises that Salva is the Professor.
13	4	"¿Qué hemos hecho?" "What Have We Done?"	Jesús Colmenar and Alex Rodrigo	Álex Pina, Esther Martínez Lobato, Javier Gómez Santander, Pablo Roa, Fernando Sancristóbal and David Barrocal	9 November 2017	1.53
Raquel takes the Professor into custody and interrogates him at the villa. The Professor admits that he has fallen in love with her, and she performs a polygraph test on him. Meanwhile, Arturo is punished for his multiple attempts to escape and Moscow reveals a secret to Denver: Moscow left his wife and Denver's mother when he was young because she was a drug addict. Denver is outraged and says he will cut Moscow out of his life. While Tokyo is transported to prison, she is freed by mercenaries sent by the Professor. She rides a motorcycle directly into the Mint, avoiding being shot by police as Moscow opens the door.
14	5	"A contrarreloj" "Against the Clock"	Alejandro Bazzano	Álex Pina, Esther Martínez Lobato, Javier Gómez Santander, Pablo Roa, Fernando Sancristóbal and David Barrocal	16 November 2017	1.48
Moscow is gravely injured by police gunfire and the police refuse to send aid. The robbers rush to finish their escape tunnel. Having escaped from and incapacitated Raquel, the Professor waits for her to wake up. He confronts her, using the fact that he did not escape while she was unconscious as proof of his love. He walks out of the villa held at gunpoint by Raquel, but she is emotionally unable and unwilling to stop him from escaping. Colonel Prieto, Suárez, and Alberto confront Raquel and remove her from the case after they identify the Professor as Salva (Sergio), with whom they believe Raquel is co-operating. With her gun and badge taken away, she steals Ángel's badge and starts to conduct her own investigation by looking through surveillance footage of restaurants to determine the route the Professor took from his hideout. As she leaves, Ángel awakens.
15	6	"Bella ciao" "Bye Beautiful"	Jesús Colmenar and Alex Rodrigo	Álex Pina, Esther Martínez Lobato, Javier Gómez Santander, Pablo Roa, Fernando Sancristóbal, Esther Morales and David Barrocal	23 November 2017	1.80
The police, led by Suárez, launch an attack on the Mint to liberate the hostages and capture the robbers. The robbers rush to escape with the €984 million they printed, less than half of their estimate. Raquel finds the Professor's hideout and she is tied up. Raquel and the Professor kiss passionately and he lets her go. Raquel visits Ángel in the hospital, where the police arrest her. At a moral crossroads, she initially refuses to divulge the Professor's hideout, but when Colonel Prieto threatens her with several charges that would cause her to lose custody of her daughter, she relents. As the police race to the hideout, a tactical squad inside the Mint is fought off by Berlin so the rest of the robbers can escape in time, until he is shot multiple times. The remaining robbers, with the addition of Mónica, escape to the Professor's hideout minutes before the police arrive to find it empty. One year later, Raquel has left the force and the robbers' whereabouts are still unknown. When Raquel notices coordinates on a postcard previously given to her by the Professor, she tracks him down in Palawan, Philippines.

=== Part 3 (2019) ===
Money Heist, part 3 episodes
No. overall	No. in part	Title	Directed by	Written by	Original release date
16	1	"Hemos vuelto" "We're Back"	Jesús Colmenar	Álex Pina and Javier Gómez Santander	19 July 2019
Over two years after the heist, Arturo gives a talk to a large crowd condemning the gang as "terrorists." Meanwhile, Tokyo and Rio have relocated to Guna Yala, Panama; Nairobi and Helsinki to La Pampa, Argentina; and Denver, Mónica and her baby to Java, Indonesia. Wanting a change of scenery, Tokyo leaves Rio in Guna Yala for the city. As she leaves, Rio gives her a phone he bought on the black market so that they can communicate. A call from Rio is intercepted by Europol and he is captured, while Tokyo escapes. She calls the Professor using a secure line, and is transported to Thailand where they meet. The Professor, alongside Raquel (now codenamed "Lisbon"), reunites the gang to rescue Rio who has been arrested and presumed to be undergoing torture. The Professor enlists three new members, Bogotá, Palermo and Marseille, into the gang and begins planning an assault on the Bank of Spain, from an Italian monastery.
17	2	"Aikido" "Aikido"	Jesús Colmenar	Álex Pina, Javier Gómez Santander, Juan Salvador López, Luis Moya, Alberto Úcar and David Barrocal	19 July 2019
The Professor initiates the plan to rob the Bank of Spain using airships to release money across Madrid. The government responds by mobilizing the army, which the robbers use to provide cover and entry into the Bank. In flashbacks, the Professor recruits Palermo, real name Martín Berrote, an experienced thief and former associate to replace Berlin. The Professor and Palermo explain that their strategy for this robbery is based on Aikido, a martial art that uses an enemy's force to create an advantage. As the robbers enter the Bank, public sentiment rallies to their side in the form of mass government protests and riots over the illegal imprisonment of Rio, demanding that he receive a public trial.
18	3	"48 metros bajo el suelo" "48 Meters Underground"	Jesús Colmenar	Álex Pina, Javier Gómez Santander, Juan Salvador López and Luis Moya	19 July 2019
While commandeering the Bank, the robbers engage in a series of intense conflicts with guards and government officials. Palermo, the commander in charge, is temporarily blinded by glass shrapnel in the struggle, though he retains command after Nairobi removes it. The robbers locate accomplices among the hostages who were previously planted in the Bank and go to work on opening the vault, which is rigged to flood with water once tampered with. Bogotá uses his expertise in diving and welding to overcome the lock down, granting access to the gold. In flashbacks, Berlin and Palermo explain the plan for breaking into the vault, stating that every step of the plan requires perfection to work with no room for error.
19	4	""Es Tiempo de Delfines"" "Its Dolphin Time"	Koldo Serra	Javier Gómez Santander, Álex Pina, Juan Salvador López, Luis Moya and Esther Martínez Lobato	19 July 2019
The crew begins the next phase of the robbery while the Professor addresses the new government officials from the intelligence directorate. Colonel Luis Tamayo and the heavily pregnant Inspector Alicia Sierra prove to be formidable adversaries, as they quickly realize that they must change their strategies drastically from the first robbery. Sierra tortures Rio for more information and Tamayo plans an assault on the bank with Suárez. The robbers reveal that they know about a second, secret vault behind the gold and attempt to persuade Mario Urbaneja, governor of the Bank, to open it for them. When he refuses, Denver hits him, triggering a seizure; they resuscitate him and use explosives instead.
20	5	"Boom, Boom, Ciao" "Boom, Boom, Ciao"	Koldo Serra	Javier Gómez Santander, Álex Pina, Juan Salvador López and Luis Moya	19 July 2019
A love interest between Palermo and Helsinki is revealed. Given no other option, the robbers detonate the inner vault door inside the flooded main chamber. It works and grants them access to "the red boxes"—cases filled with government secrets that were too dangerous to lock anywhere else. Tamayo's assault begins, taking the robbers and the Professor by surprise. To stall for time and prevent bloodshed, Denver runs into the line of fire with a truce flag carrying two of the red cases, which forces Tamayo to stop. He reveals to Sierra the contents of the cases and that the Professor has the advantage—an attack might force the robbers to make the secrets public. However, Sierra is able to unbalance the Professor and Lisbon with psychological taunting. Inside the bank, the team divides when Nairobi and Palermo disagree over the use of force on the unruly restrained guards. Nairobi reveals her love for Helsinki and berates Palermo for not acting on his feelings for Berlin while the latter was alive.
21	6	"Todo pareció insignificante" "Everything Seemed Insignificant"	Álex Rodrigo	Javier Gómez Santander, Álex Pina, Juan Salvador López, Luis Moya and Ana Boyero	19 July 2019
In flashbacks, the Professor discusses the plans for the bank with Martín, Andrés, and Andrés' love interest, Tatiana, where he is immediately alarmed at how much she knows. Andrés defends her, stating that he is in love, but the Professor vehemently disagrees, arguing that the first rule of the heist must be to forego personal attachments. In the present, Sierra plans to neutralize the Professor's blackmail leverage by releasing false information to the media. Tamayo agrees and organizes a second breach led by Suárez. The Professor and Lisbon have an argument and lose communication with the team inside the bank, just after learning this. Having relied on mobile transportation and broadcasting, they become stuck when a tree breaks their antenna and the wheels of their RV sink in mud. They narrowly escape detection with the help of some sympathetic local farmers. They then manage to inform the team of the breach 10 minutes before it happens, who defeat, capture, unclothe, and humiliate the breaching team by forcing them to sing "Bella ciao" on video. Given no other option, Tamayo and Sierra agree to release Rio in exchange for the breaching team and 40 hostages.
22	7	"Pequeñas vacaciones" "A Quick Vacation"	Álex Rodrigo	Javier Gómez Santander, Álex Pina, Almudena Ramírez-Pantanella, Ana Boyero, Juan Salvador López and Luis Moya	19 July 2019
The exchange proceeds smoothly and Rio rejoins the gang. While the hostages are leaving, Arturo, wanting to see Mónica, runs into the Bank of Spain and becomes a hostage. During the reunion, the police and government intelligence team listen in on their conversations, having implanted a listening device inside Rio before releasing him. In flashbacks, the Professor instructs the team, preparing them to detect and remove these devices surgically from Rio, if the time comes. He instructs Tokyo to act normally in spite of the listening device, as he hopes to use their sexual intimacy to convince the police that the listening device is working. Privately, Rio breaks up with Tokyo, believing that she will be better off with someone else. Nairobi then surgically removes the listening device. The police manage to locate the Professor and Lisbon using a drone, forcing them to separate and try to escape on foot; the Professor camouflages himself in a tree, while Lisbon is unable and takes refuge in a barn.
23	8	"La deriva" "Astray"	Jesús Colmenar	Javier Gómez Santander, Álex Pina, Almudena Ramírez-Pantanella, Emilio Díez and Luis Moya	19 July 2019
Tokyo gets drunk and insults Rio. In the forest, a massive manhunt begins for the Professor and Lisbon. Lisbon is discovered in the barn by farmers, which begins a Mexican Standoff. The robbers create a diversion to make the police think that they are escaping, drawing resources away from the manhunt. Meanwhile, Sierra brings Nairobi's son, Axel, in front of the bank, luring Nairobi to a window. Sierra gives the green light for a police sniper to shoot, and Nairobi is shot in the chest. As the robbers scramble to aid Nairobi, the police begin the assault. In the forest, Suárez and the Civil Guard find Lisbon and remove the farmers from the barn. At Sierra's orders, Suárez fakes her execution and takes her into custody; the Professor hears the charade over Lisbon's microphone and becomes despondent. Palermo radios the Professor to inform him of the incoming assault and the Professor declares DEFCON 2. Tokyo and Rio destroy the approaching armoured car with RPG-7s.

=== Part 4 (2020) ===
Money Heist, part 4 episodes
No. overall	No. in part	Title	Directed by	Written by	Original release date
24	1	"Game Over" "Game Over"	Koldo Serra	Esther Morales, Ana Boyero and Juan Salvador López	3 April 2020
The gang rushes to save Nairobi's life, but given the risks surrounding the surgery that they must perform on her, she pleads to be released to the police so that she can get proper care. Meanwhile, the Professor manages to escape the forest after Marseille lures the police away with a tracker they believe to be the Professor escaping. After an argument between gang members develops about the decision to perform surgery on Nairobi, Tokyo stages a coup d'état and leads the surgery with the video aid of a surgeon in Pakistan. The Professor negotiates a truce with Tamayo for 48 hours to assess Nairobi. In flashbacks, Nairobi convinces Tokyo that she ask the Professor to be the leader of the heist, but the Professor insists that since Palermo came up with the idea for the heist, he will be in charge.
25	2	"La boda de Berlín" "Berlin's Wedding"	Javier Quintas	Ana Boyero, Jaun Salvador López, Emilio Díez and Luis Moya	3 April 2020
Tokyo's surgery of Nairobi succeeds. With Tokyo in charge, the ego-centric Palermo is about to walk out of the bank but is quickly chained to a chair by the gang. Meanwhile, Lisbon is transported to a police tent outside the bank, where she is interrogated by Sierra. Tokyo calls the Professor, who is furious at her coup, however, Tokyo helps him deduce that the police had staged Lisbon's execution and that she is being interrogated inside the police tent. In flashbacks, as Marseille, Bogotá and the Professor celebrate Berlin's wedding to Tatiana, the Professor expresses concern to Berlin about marrying since he has a terminal illness. In the present, the Professor and Marseille break into the apartment of Tamayo's assistant, Antoñanzas, but he jumps out of his window into the pool below. Sierra tells Lisbon that if she cooperates, her probable 30 year sentence could be reduced to 10 years, and that she would be out in five years.
26	3	"Lección de anatomía" "Anatomy Lesson"	Álex Rodrigo	Ana Boyero and Juan Salvador López	3 April 2020
The Professor and Marseille help Antoñanzas out of the pool, and persuade him to do tasks for them by offering him €1 million. Antoñanzas admits that Lisbon is being held in the tent; the Professor gives him his watch to wear so she will know that the Professor is aware she is alive. Lisbon's ex-husband, Alberto finds a phone SIM card that Lisbon had attempted to destroy. The police analyze it and find one call made to Mindanao, Philippines—where Lisbon's mother and daughter are staying. Sierra allows Lisbon to call her family so they can leave before the police arrive. Just as Lisbon is about to do so, she notices Antoñanzas wearing the Professor's watch and stops. In flashbacks, the Professor raises concerns with Berlín that Palermo has more love for being in command than for the team. In the present, Palermo creates chaos to reestablish his command by colluding with Gandía, chief of security at the Bank of Spain. Gandía dislocates his thumb in order to slip through his handcuffs as counselled by Palermo, and Rio, guarding the hostages, is emotionally unable to stop Gandía from escaping. Meanwhile, Nairobi regains consciousness.
27	4	"Suspiros de España" "Pasodoble"	Jesús Colmenar	Emilio Díez and Luis Moya	3 April 2020
The gang rush to find Gandía. Gandía has already found Nairobi and attempts to suffocate her with a pillow, but she is able to stab him in the neck with a needle; he flees as the gang rush to Nairobi. Gandía almost kills Helsinki by hanging as he drops a noose around his neck from the ceiling. Bogotá and Tokyo save Helsinki. Before Gandía retreats to a secret panic room, he cuts the telecommunication cords, rendering the Professor's cameras in the bank inoperative. The panic room is equipped with weapons and a communication centre, which Gandía uses to communicate with Tamayo. Tamayo tells him that they are under a truce with the Professor, but he wants to coordinate an attack. Antoñanzas tells the Professor that Gandía is communicating with the police from a panic room, and as the Professor relays this information to Tokyo, Gandía knocks her out from behind.
28	5	"5 minutos antes" "5 Minutes Earlier"	Koldo Serra and Álex Rodrigo	Ana Boyero, Jaun Salvador López, Emilio Díez and Luis Moya	3 April 2020
In flashbacks, Denver and Moscow ask the Professor if Juan, Moscow's godchild, can join them in the heist, but the Professor is hesitant. In the present, Gandía restrains Tokyo in the panic room, then announces over the intercom that he has Tokyo, and that Palermo aided his escape. The Professor, Moscow and Denver meet Juan, who is now a trans woman who goes by Julia. In the present, she poses as a hostage in the bank, under the codename "Manila." Palermo admits to the Professor that what Gandía said is true; the Professor assures Palermo he will be punished later and orders the group to unchain him. While in the freight elevator, Bogotá and Nairobi kiss and mention they should marry after the heist. As Rio and Denver enter an elevator, Gandía throws a grenade into it just as the doors close, and the two rush to muffle the grenade with their bulletproof vests and helmets; they survive the explosion. As a shootout ensues between Gandía and the gang, Gandía escapes through a duct. The duct leads him to the bathroom where Nairobi is held.
29	6	"KO técnico" "TKO"	Javier Quintas	Esther Martínez Lobato, Emilio Díez and Luis Moya	3 April 2020
Hearing Nairobi's gunfire, the gang rush to her. Gandía shoots a hole through the door and forces her head through it while he ties her hands to the door. In flashbacks, Nairobi asks the Professor to be the father of her child by in vitro fertilisation because she believes the Professor to have good genes. Initially opposed to the idea, the Professor agrees. In the present, although the panic room is not present on the bank's blueprints, the Professor deduces the location of the panic room to be in the vicinity of the governor's office—behind the governor's bathroom. The Professor tells Palermo this and sends Marseille to Algeria, where the police tortured Rio, to gather intel. Tamayo and Suárez plan an assault on the bank. Gandía unties Nairobi and uses her to escape while the group holds him at gunpoint. As he escapes, he shoots Nairobi dead. Denver throws a grenade, which injures Gandía.
30	7	"Tumbar la carpa" "Strike the Tent"	Koldo Serra	Emilio Díez, Luis Moya, Ana Boyero and Juan Salvador López	3 April 2020
Wounded, Gandía makes it back to the panic room. The gang uncover the tunnel to the panic room behind the governor's bathroom. The Professor nationally broadcasts a video of Rio recounting his illegal detainment and torture by police. Meanwhile, the Professor enlists Benjamín, father of Manila, and his crew to participate in a plan to free Lisbon. In a press conference, Colonel Prieto denies Rio's accusations, but Marseille forces a man who had taken part in Rio's torture in Algeria to corroborate Rio's story, which is broadcast nationally via video during the press conference. This deflates Tamayo's plans, and he calls off his planned assault on the bank. Tamayo tells Sierra that she must take the blame. Meanwhile, Gandía unties Tokyo to remove the shrapnel from his back, but she knocks him unconscious and the group frees her. The Professor then nationally broadcasts a video of himself exposing the illegal detainment of Lisbon inside the police tent outside the bank. The Ministry of the Interior takes over Lisbon's custody and removes her from the tent.
31	8	"Plan París" "The Paris Plan"	Jesús Colmenar	Ana Boyero, Emilio Díez, Luis Moya and Jaun Salvador López	3 April 2020
In flashbacks, Berlín and Palermo passionately kiss; however, Berlin says they must part ways because their love would interfere with the plan. In the present, Sierra admits to several damaging acts to the press. As Sierra is fired and legal proceedings begin against her, she pursues the Professor on her own. Benjamín and Marseille construct a tunnel leading to the parking garage of the Supreme Court of Spain, where Lisbon is brought to testify. Benjamín and his crew ambush the guards as Lisbon is escorted through the parking garage. They strap them with bombs, bring in a woman disguised as Lisbon, and coerce them to take their scheduled route. The gang forces Gandía to radio to Tamayo that he is under attack and requests to be evacuated from the roof. The Professor intercepts Tamayo's request for a helicopter and sends his own, piloted by Marseille to deceptively transport a disguised Lisbon to the bank. Lisbon is reunited with the gang, and they chant "for Nairobi!" just as Sierra finds the Professor's hideout and holds him at gunpoint.

=== Part 5 (2021) ===
Money Heist, part 5 episodes
No. overall	No. in part	Title	Directed by	Written by	Original release date
Volume 1
32	1	"El final del camino" "The End of the Road"	Jesus Colmenar & Kolda Serra	Juan Savador López, Javier Gómez Santander and Álex Pina	3 September 2021
Sierra holds the Professor captive to extract informations about the gang's plan to extract the gold reserve from the bank; the Professor admits defeat and calls off the plan. Unaware of this situation, Tamayo asks for help from the military to end the hostage situation at the bank, and — in his pursuit of the Professor — to raid Benjamín's farm after the sighting there of the vehicle used in Lisbon's escape. When the vehicle is stopped, the raiding team finds out it is being driven merely by another farmer whom the Professor earlier hired as an accomplice. In flashbacks, Berlín asks his son, a cyber-security expert named Rafael, to join his heist.
33	2	"¿Crees en la reencarnación?" "Do You Believe in Reincarnation?"	Jesus Colmenar	Juan Savador López, Javier Gómez Santander and Álex Pina	3 September 2021
As the army arrives, Lisbon, Tokyo, and Stockholm bring some of the hostages outside the bank. The three come to the front of the hostages and declare to Tamayo's men their desire to negotiate the gang's surrender. When Tamayo comes out and meets the three for the negotiation, Lisbon tells him they will first release Gandía who needs medical attention. There and then she also realizes that the negotiators are unaware of Sierra's capture of the Professor, so the three buy time by going back inside the bank to supposedly 'consult with the Professor', bringing the hostages back inside with them. During a fistfight between Gandia, Tokyo and Bogota, Arturo snatches a number of weapons and escapes with his group, injuring Denver in the shootout. He and Urbaneja end up in the loading dock, where the gang's arsenal are stashed. Stockholm, outraged by Arturo's intercom conversation with her about their son, shoots him. Meanwhile, Sierra captures Benjamín and Marseille who have arrived at the hideout.
34	3	"El espectáculo de la vida" "The Spectacle of Life"	Kolda Serra	Juanjo Ramírez Mascaró, Juan Savador López, Javier Gómez Santander and Álex Pina	3 September 2021
Stockholm instantly regrets shooting Arturo and tries to revive him. Lisbon releases Arturo to a medical team outside, along with some other hostages, in order to try to record conversations on the outside. Palermo arranges a plan for the team for the final fight should the Special Forces break inside the bank. Tamayo tells the media that Sierra is a traitor who has joined the Professor's team. Sierra unties her captives when she realizes she needs their assistance to deliver her child. In flashbacks, Berlin continues to persuade his son to join him in heists while Moscow convinces Benjamín to allow Manila to join the Professor's team.
35	4	"Tu sitio en el cielo" "Your Place in Heaven"	Álex Rodrigo and Jesús Colmenar	Juanjo Ramírez Mascaró, Juan Savador López, Javier Gómez Santander and Álex Pina	3 September 2021
The Professor restarts communication with his team while Sagasta, a commander of the Special Forces, goes inside the bank with his hand-picked team and Gandía. The Professor blackmails Tamayo to stop sending more troops inside the bank after proving that he has his audio of his dirty scheming that cost Sierra her job, which was recorded by Lisbon when she freed some hostages. The Professor's team is cornered and Helsinki gets injured during a shootout with Sagasta's team. In the past, Tokyo discusses the afterlife with Nairobi while Berlin teaches his son how to plan a perfect heist.
36	5	"Vivir muchas vidas" "Live Many Lives"	Jesús Colmenar and Koldo Serra	Juanjo Ramírez Mascaró, Juan Savador López, David Barrocal, Esther Martínez Lobato, Javier Gómez Santander and Álex Pina	3 September 2021
In flashbacks it is seen how the Professor recruited Tokyo, after her boyfriend died during a bank heist, and how she later developed feelings for Rio. At the bank, snipers shoot Tokyo while her partners keep trying to find ways of attacking Sagasta's group. Despite hallucinations after shooting Arturo, Stockholm treats Helsinki and suggests to Denver the use of a service lift to escape Sagasta's team's attack. Denver and Rio devise plans to rescue Tokyo, but with Sagasta's team closing in on her, she allows them to gun her down and surround her before detonating grenades to blow them all up.
Volume 2
37	6	"Válvulas de escape" "Escape Valve"	Koldo Serra & Álex Rodrigo	Javier Gómez Santander, Álex Pina, Juanjo Ramírez Mascaró, Juan Salvador López, David Barrocal & Esther Martínez Lobato	3 December 2021
The only survivors of Tokyo's explosion are Sagasta and two soldiers with minor injuries. Meanwhile, Sierra runs out of the Professor's hideout to confront Tamayo. The Professor finds her but she takes him hostage and goes to Tamayo's apartment. During a confrontation with Tamayo, Sierra gets surrounded by police teams and the Professor helps her escape along with her newborn daughter, Victoria. And in the flashback, Berlin steals the pump required to flush out the gold from the bank, using underground pipes.
38	7	"Ciencia ilusionada" "Wishful Thinking"	Albert Pintó	Javier Gómez Santander, Álex Pina, Juanjo Ramírez Mascaró, Juan Salvador López, David Barrocal & Esther Martínez Lobato	3 December 2021
Sierra and the Professor evade police and plan to team up for the remainder of the heist. On the other hand, gold starts being pumped out from the bank to a stormwater tank, using the pump that Berlin had stolen in the past, where Benjamin's crew start melting and shaping it into gold bars.
39	8	"La teoría de la elegancia" "The Elegance Theory"	Álex Rodrigo	Javier Gómez Santander, Álex Pina, David Barrocal & Esther Martínez Lobato	3 December 2021
The Professor's team celebrates the successful transportation of the gold to their secret location, unaware of the fact that police raided that location. Meanwhile Sagasta executes a successful plan to convince Lisbon into assuming that all his team are dead and he is left with only one severely injured soldier, who needs medical attention. Lisbon agrees to allow doctors into the bank while one of Sagasta's soldiers hides and secretly defuses bombs around the entrances of the bank so special forces could easily enter. In a flashback, Berlin's wife, Tatiana, leaves him for his own son, Rafael.
40	9	"Lo que se habla en la cama" "Pillow Talk"	Koldo Serra	Javier Gómez Santander, Álex Pina, Juan Salvador López & David Barrocal	3 December 2021
Police arrest the Professor and Sierra along with Benjamin's crew. The Professor later learns that someone hoodwinked them and stole all the gold in a fake police raid. They inform the team inside the bank about the stolen bars of gold and minutes later special forces storm in and take control of bank. The Professor offers to surrender himself at the bank and ask Benjamin's crew to help Sierra in searching for the stolen gold and start "Plan Tom Thumb".
41	10	"Una tradición familiar" "A Family Tradition"	Jesús Colmenar	David Barrocal, Juan Salvador López, Esther Martínez Lobato and Álex Pina	3 December 2021
In a flashback, The Professor sees his father killed by guards during a heist. At the bank, Tamayo asks Denver to make a deal and tell him where the gold is. Denver refuses and is handed over to police outside the bank. Videos of the heist are released online by The Professor's hackers in Pakistan, showing gold being flushed out of the bank, impacting the stock market dramatically, but Tamayo does not agree to strike a deal with The Professor. Police search for the gold in the wrong locations due to fake clues left by Marseille. Sierra tracks down Rafael and Tatiana, who stole the gold bars, and gives them a message from The Professor. The Professor assures Tamayo that the gold will be returned to the bank if he releases a statement saying that the matter has been peacefully resolved. The news of the trucks bringing the gold back helps stabilize the stock market, but Tamayo discovers the blocks are gold-painted brass. The Professor tells Tamayo that the fake gold bars will save the country's economy, giving him an ultimatum to either continue the lie and let them escape, or reveal the blocks are fake which will topple the economy. Tamayo faces the press and lies that The Professor and his team died while Denver will stay in witness protection after "revealing" the location of the gold; he also announces that the hostages and gold reserves are safe, restoring confidence in the Spanish economy. The Professor and his team get new identities and use the gold that Sierra carried across the border to Portugal, and the note is revealed to be a promise to give Rafael and Tatiana a cut. The Professor and his team fly off in an army helicopter to an undisclosed location to start their new lives.
