= Romancero (TV series) =

Spanish supernatural horror television series

- Promotional release poster
- Genre: Supernatural horror
- Created by: Fernando Navarro; MANSON
- Directed by: MANSON
- Starring: Elena Matic; Sasha Cócola
- Country of origin: Spain
- Original language: Spanish
- No. of seasons: 1
- No. of episodes: 6

Production
- Executive producers: Javier Méndez; Fernando Navarro; Alejandro Flórez; Maya Maidagan

Original release
- Network: Amazon Prime Video
- Release: 3 November 2023

Romancero is a Spanish supernatural horror television series created by Fernando Navarro and MANSON based on an original idea of Karina Kolokolchykova for Amazon Prime Video.

== Plot ==
Set in Andalusia, the plot tracks two kids (Cornelia and Jordán) on the run during a nightmarish night.

== Cast ==
- Elena Matic as Cornelia
- Sasha Cócola as Jordán
- Ricardo Gómez as Sorroche
- Guillermo Toledo
- Belén Cuesta as Carmen
- Julieta Cardinali
- Alba Flores as Tábata

== Production ==
The series is a 100 Balas (The Mediapro Studio) production. Shooting locations in the province of Almería included the municipalities of El Ejido, Níjar, and Tabernas whilst footage was also shot in the Portland Valderribas quarry in Madrid. The series consists of 6 episodes featuring an average runtime of about 30 minutes.

== Release ==
The series had a presentation at the 56th Sitges Film Festival on October 13, 2023. It was released by Amazon Prime Video on 3 November 2023.
