= Lee Si-woo (actress) =

South Korean model and actress (born 1997)

- Born: September 5, 1997 (age 28); South Korea
- Occupations: Actress; model
- Years active: 2018–present
- Agent: Big Picture

Korean name
- Hangul: 이시우
- Hanja: 李施宇
- RR: I Siu
- MR: I Siu

Lee Si-woo (Korean: 이시우; born September 5, 1997) is a South Korean actress and model under Big Picture Entertainment. She is best known for her roles in Sisyphus: The Myth (2021), Be My Boyfriend (2021), Shooting Stars (2022) and Money Heist: Korea – Joint Economic Area (2022).

== Career ==
=== 2018–present: Modelling and acting debut ===
Lee made her debut as a model under Big Picture Entertainment. She made her acting debut in Sisyphus: The Myth in 2021, playing the role as Bing Bing and Lee Ji-hun. She was cast as the lead in the web series Be My Boyfriend as Oh Ji-na in 2021. She was also cast for the role of Jin Yu-Na in Sh**ting Stars (2021). In 2026, Lee had a supporting role in the fantasy romantic-comedy No Tail to Tell which aired on SBS. She played Geum-ho opposite Kim Hye-yoon and Lomon.

== Filmography ==
=== Television series ===
Year	Title	Role	Notes	Ref.
2021	Sisyphus: The Myth	Bing Bing / Lee Ji-hun		
2022	Shooting Stars	Jin Yu-na		
2022	O'pening: "Babel Syndrome"	Go Yeon-hee	One act-drama; season 5	
2023	My Lovely Liar	Syaon		
2023	Arthdal Chronicles	Nunbyeol	Season 2	
2026	No Tail to Tell	Geum-ho		

=== Web series ===
Year	Title	Role	Notes	Ref.
2021	Be My Boyfriend	Oh Ji-na		
2022	Money Heist: Korea – Joint Economic Area	Anne Kim	Part 1–2	
2022	The Fabulous	Esther		

=== Music video appearances ===
Year	Song title	Artist	Ref.
2021	"Sometimes I Cry"	Chae Yeon	
