= Arturo Román =

Character in Money Heist

Arturito Sarthak Román
- Money Heist character
- Arturo with his revamped appearance in part 3
- First appearance: "Do as Planned" (2017)
- Last appearance: "Live Many Lives" (2021)
- Created by: Álex Pina
- Portrayed by: Enrique Arce

In-universe information
- Alias: Arturito
- Occupation: Director of the Royal Mint of Spain (former); Public speaker
- Spouse: Laura Román (divorced)
- Significant other: Mónica Gaztambide (separated)
- Children: Three unnamed children Cincinnati (son)
- Nationality: Spanish

Arturo Román is a fictional character in the Netflix series Money Heist, portrayed by Enrique Arce. He is a hostage in parts 1 and 2, having been the Director of the Royal Mint of Spain, before spinning his experience into a massively successful public speaking career. Years later, in part 3, he returns to being a hostage as part of a bigger plan to undermine the gang's new robbery at the Bank of Spain.

== The character ==
In parts 1 and 2, Arturo is a major driving force of the hostages' opposition against their captors. He receives the derogatory nickname "Arturito" (English: little Arturo) from Denver in the series' first episode, which sticks for the remainder of the series. Unhappy with his life after the assault on the Mint and longing to re-establish a relationship with his former mistress Mónica, Arturo takes measures to become a hostage again during the Bank of Spain heist in part 3.

As he was focused on his acting career in the United States, Arce was originally not interested in auditioning for the role of Arturo, whom he considered "a disgusting guy". He decided otherwise after seeing a lottery advertisement as a sign and because Arturo's character arc was intended to be short-lived, with the character supposed to die after the sixth episode. Brazilian magazine Veja described the character as "loved by some and hated by others (and probably much more hated)", and Marco Almodóvar of El Economista found Arturo "a bit unbearable" at first and later a fan favorite, so the creators opted to have part 3 open with Arturo as a hero. Arce attributed this change in audience perception to the comic relief the character provides, despite contributing little to the story. Guillermo Courau of La Nación named Arturo in part 3 a prime example for the part's unnecessary substories that break the rhythm, and assumed that the character was only brought over to please fans.
