= Darko Perić (actor) =

Serbian actor

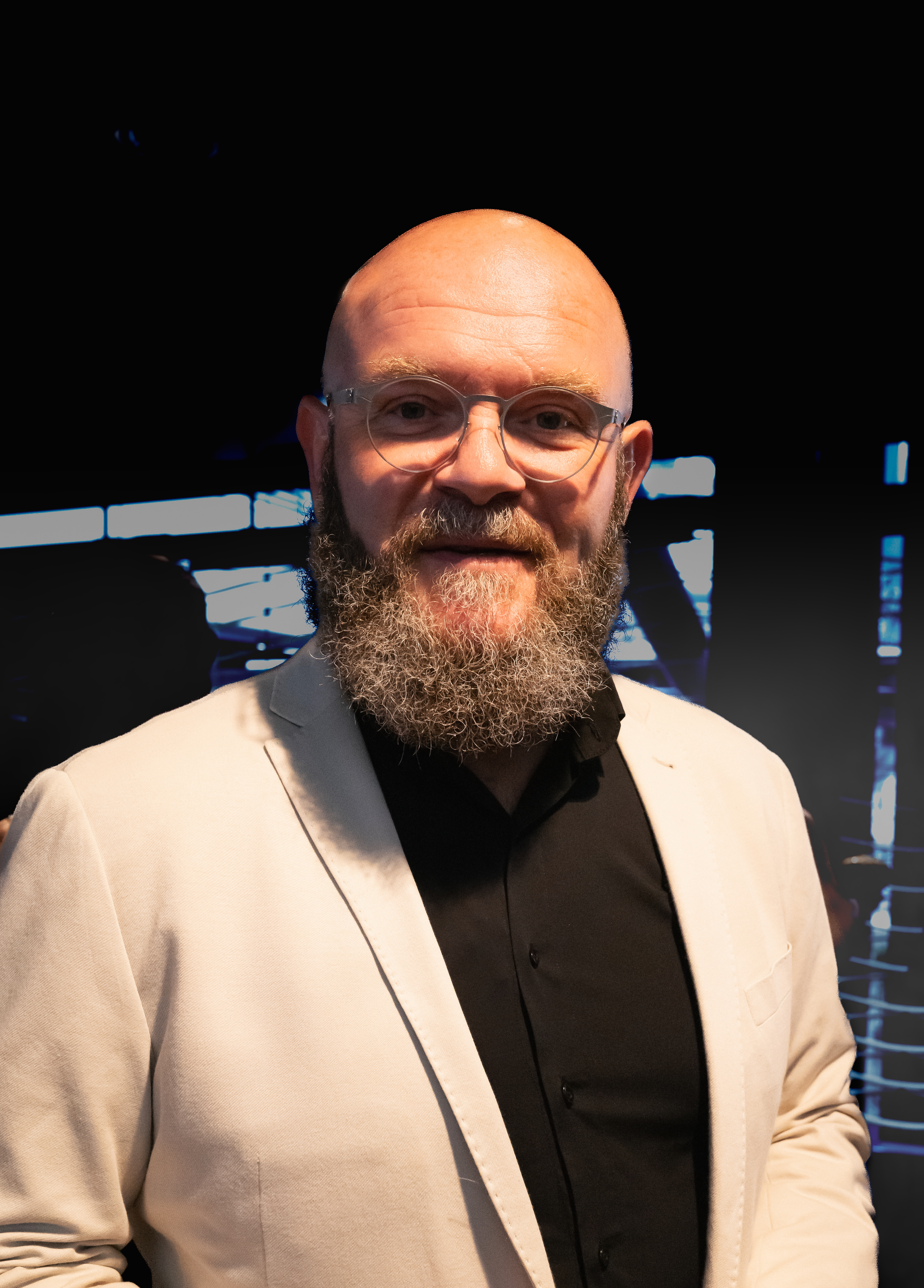
- Perić in 2022
- Born: 25 March 1977 (age 49); Kladovo, SR Serbia, Yugoslavia
- Occupation: Actor
- Years active: 2000–present

Darko Perić (Serbian Cyrillic: Дарко Перић; born 25 March 1977) is a Serbian-Spanish actor. He is best known for playing Helsinki in the Spanish crime thriller series La Casa de Papel (Money Heist).

== Early life ==
Perić was born in Kladovo. He showed interest in the arts from a very young age; his first time onstage came at the age of six, when a Cuban singer invited him to sing "Guantanamera". That moment inspired him to perform in every school play. In 1991, at the start of the Yugoslav Wars, his dreams of going to animation school in Zagreb were halted. His parents decided that he should instead become a doctor. He was sent to veterinary school in Bucharest in Romania, where he rediscovered his passion for the cinema and theatre thanks to his student friends at the Romanian Film Academy. During that time, he continued to study medicine while acting in short films.

In 1994, Perić moved to the Romanian city of Timișoara, where he continued his studies of medicine and performed in live theatre. After six years of living in Timișoara, he finished his studies and graduated with honours in veterinary medicine. While there, he had also gotten involved in the local hardcore and punk scenes, singing in bands and organizing events in the local cultural centre, where he met many international artists. This inspired him to move to Germany, where he settled in Berlin. He continued to act in short films there until 2004, when he moved to Spain and chose Barcelona as a place to live.

== Career ==
Perić was cast in his first major Spanish job in the series Crematorio for Canal + in 2010. In 2015, he performed in A Perfect Day. In 2016, he was cast in the Atresmedia produced series Sea of Plastic / Mar de plástico, in which he played Oso, a Ukrainian gangster and the main villain in the series. His best known role is of Helsinki in the crime thriller series Money Heist (2017–2021). The series was acquired by Netflix, which helped it become one of the most watched shows, winning the Best Drama at the Emmy Awards in 2018.

== Personal life ==
Perić speaks six languages and teaches Qigong around the world in masterclasses titled "Qigong: Physical and Mental Preparation for Actors". He is an avid basketball fan.

== Filmography ==
=== Film ===
Year	Film	Role	Notes
2014	Kamikaze	Jefe Protección Civil	
2015	A Perfect Day	Water Seller	
2015	It's Now or Never	Taxista Amsterdam 1	
2016	Garantía personal	Toro	
2017	Patria	Ioan	Short film
2017	Homeland		Short film
2019	Bajo el mismo techo	Chiquitin	
2019	Luces de Gas	Stan	Short film
2019	El Cerro de los Dioses	Goran	
2023	Atatürk 1881-1919	Stiliyan Kovachev	
2024	The Price of Nonna's Inheritance	Bojan	
2024	The Danube is my sea	Himself	Short film
2026	Sanctuary		

=== Television ===
Year	Title	Role	Notes
2008	13 anys i un dia		1 episode
2008	El cor de la ciutat	Home Vicky 1	1 episode
2011	Crematorio		3 episodes
2012	Kubala, Moreno i Manchón		1 episode
2014	Aída		1 episode
2014	La que se avecina	Vigilante de seguridad	1 episode
2014–2015	B&b, de boca en boca	Serbio	2 episodes
2015	Águila Roja		1 episode
2016	Buscando el norte		1 episode
2016	Mar de plástico	Oso	4 episodes
2017	El crac		1 episode
2017	Sé quién eres	Preso Cantina	1 episode
2017–2021	La casa de papel	Mirko Dragić "Helsinki"	41 episodes
2018	La verdad	Mijael Varanov	2 episodes
2020	Vallero!	Sue Savage	1 episode
