= Alba Flores =

Spanish actress (born 1986)

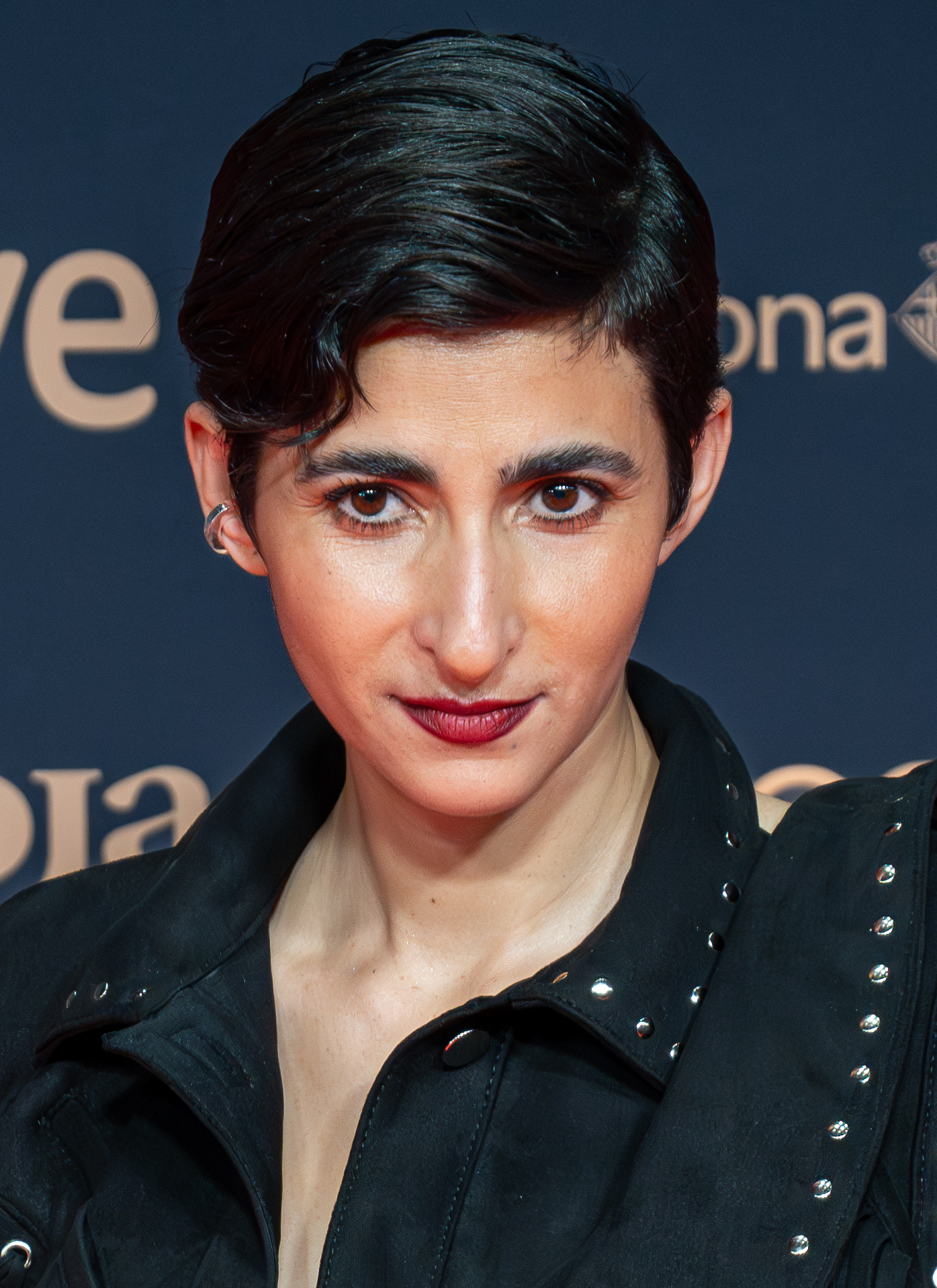
- at the Premios Goya 2026 by Pedro J Pacheco
- Born: Alba González Villa; October 27, 1986 (age 40); Madrid, Spain
- Occupation: Actress
- Years active: 2003–present
- Father: Antonio Flores
- Relatives: Lola Flores (grandmother); Lolita Flores (aunt); Rosario Flores (aunt); Elena Furiase (cousin); Quique Sánchez Flores (second uncle)

Alba González Villa (born October 27, 1986), known professionally as Alba Flores, is a Spanish actress. She is best known for her roles as Saray Vargas in the prison crime drama series Vis a Vis (2015–2019) and Nairobi in the heist series Money Heist (2017–2021).

== Early life ==
Flores is the daughter of musician and composer Antonio Flores and Ana Villa, a theatrical producer. Her family consists of Romani performers, musicians, and actors: She is the granddaughter of Lola Flores, known as "La Faraona" ("The Pharaoh"), niece of singers Lolita Flores and Rosario Flores, and cousin of actress Elena Furiase. Her paternal grandfather, Antonio González referred to as "El Pescaílla" was also a Spanish singer and guitarist, and is considered to be one of the fathers of Catalan Rumba. She is Romani. Her father composed a song dedicated for her entitled "Alba". She was nine years old when her father died.

Flores studied dramatic interpretation from the age of 13, with secondary training in piano performance. Her early roles on stage included Luna de miel en Hiroshima (Honeymoon in Hiroshima) (2005) and the Romani version of A Midsummer Night's Dream (2007).

== Career ==
=== 2005–2014: Career beginnings ===
In 2005, Alba made her film debut in Chus Gutiérrez's, El calentito, alongside Verónica Sánchez, Ruth Díaz, Macarena Gómez, Estíbaliz Gabilondo, and Lluvia Rojo. Her television debut was in an episode of the series the El comisario in 2006. In 2008, she landed a role in the Antenna 3 television series The Ulysses Syndrome. That year, she performed in the musical theater production of Enamorados anónimos (Love Anonymous: The Copla Musical in Broadway) helmed by dance choreographer Blanca Li and music composer Javier Limón.

In 2009, she recorded her father's song, "No Puedo Enamorarme de Ti (I cannot fall in love with you)", for the soundtrack of a movie by Roberto Santiago's, Al final del camino, starring Malena Alterio and Fernando Tejero.

She trained at the Corazza Acting Studio by the renowned acting coach Juan Carlos Corazza. She participated in the studio's 2011 theater play, Comedia Y Sueno (Comedia and Dream, the most beautiful lie).

Beginning in 2013, she was cast as the protagonist's Moroccan servant, Jamila, in the Antena 3 series El tiempo entre costuras (The Time in Between), set in Spain and the Northern Protectorates in Morocco, following the Spanish Civil War. She then played an Indian woman in Vincente Ferrer, a television film based on the life of Spanish Missionary Vicente Ferrer. Filming took place in Anantapur, India. This was followed by an appearance in the TVE series Cuéntame as an important witness in a plot involving corrupt police.

=== 2015–2019: Breakthrough with Vis a Vis ===
From 2015 to 2019, she played Saray Vargas de Jesús, a Romani woman who initially faced a 5-year prison sentence for Assault in the prison crime drama series Vis a Vis (Locked Up). Considered a clever and thrilling breakout out hit by critics, the show gave Flores her first breakout role in television. For this, she received her first TV Award, a shared Onda Award for Best Female Performer in Fiction with the female cast of the series, a Best Supporting Actress in a Television Series Award from the Spanish Actors Union Awards, and several other nominations. In 2017, Netflix bought Global streaming rights for the show. With a strong following, the show ran for a total of four seasons plus the spinoff fifth season Vis a vis: El Oasis (2020). Flores, who played an essential character on Vis a Vis, had a special guest appearance in the finale of El Oasis.

In 2016, she performed in the Spanish theatrical production of La Rosa Tatuada by Tennessee Williams. In 2017, she played Políxena, the daughter of the King of Troy, in production of Troyanas, based on the tragedy written by Greek playwright Euripides about the Women of Troy after the end of Trojan War. It premiered on Mérida International Classical Theatre Festival. Flores was nominated for Best Supporting Actress Award in Spanish Actors Union Awards for her performance.

=== 2017–present: International recognition with La Casa de Papel ===
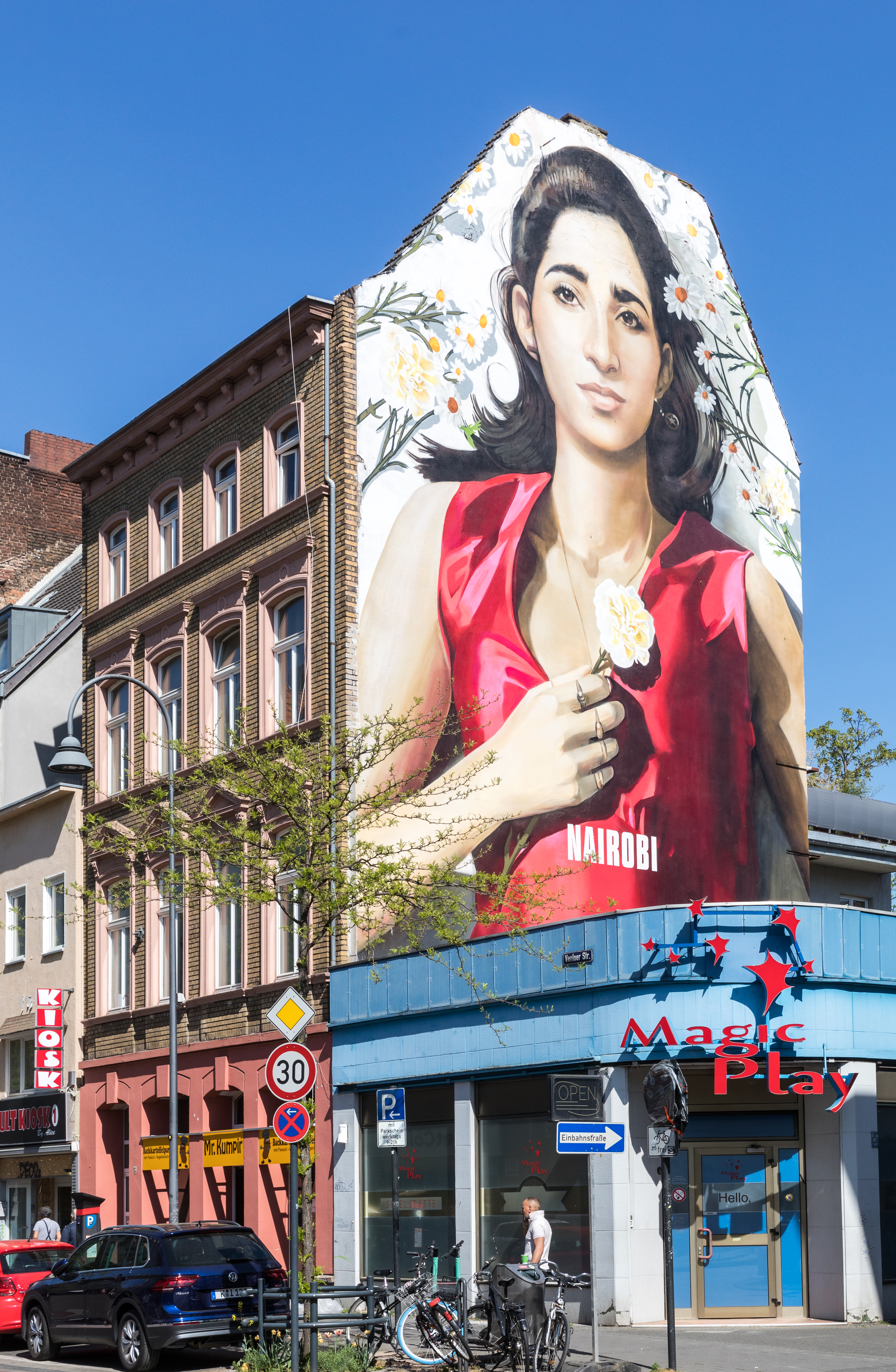
Nairobi mural in Ehrenfeld, Cologne

While working with Álex Pina in Vis a Vis, the producer asked her if she wanted to join his new show La Casa de Papel (Money Heist). She did not audition as Pina wrote a role for her as one of the bank robbers, nicknamed Nairobi, an expert in counterfeiting and forgery in charge of printing the money in Parts One and Two and overseeing the melting of gold in Parts Three and Four. After the series was cancelled after its one-season run, Netflix acquired the global streaming rights in 2017 and ordered additional seasons. Since then, it gained worldwide recognition, becoming Netflix's most viewed non-English series. It received critical praise and won several awards including best drama series at the International Emmy Awards. Her role as Nairobi brought her international recognition as well as several acting accolades, including winning an Iris Award for Best Actress.

In 2017, Flores performed in the musical play "Drac Pack" co-written by her Vis a Vis co-star and friend Najwa Nimri. In 2020, she served as the Spanish narrator for the Netflix nature documentary Night on Earth. In 2021, she performed in the Spanish theatrical production of La excepción y la regla by German Playwright Bertolt Brecht, for which she was nominated for Best Theatre Actress by Fotogramas de Plata.

== Personal life ==
Flores is vegetarian and has campaigned on behalf of the Latin division of People for the Ethical Treatment of Animals, saying that, "You have to leave the animals off the plate".

In March 2022, she was among 151 international feminists who signed the Feminist Resistance Against War: A Manifesto in solidarity with the Russian Feminist Anti-War Resistance. (Note: This manifesto was criticized by both Ukrainian feminists and members of the Feminist Anti-War Resistance themselves.)

== Acting credits ==
=== Film ===
Year	Title	Role	Director
2005	El calentito	Amaya	Chus Gutiérrez
2006	Los managers	Chica Casting	Fernando Guillén Cuervo
2013	Vicente Ferrer	Shamira	Agustín Crespi
2015	The Memory of Water	Carmen	Matías Bize
2023	Te estoy amando locamente (Love & Revolution)	Lole	

=== Television ===
Year	Title	Role	Notes
2006	El comisario	Sohara	Episode: "Y dime tonta"
2008	El síndrome de Ulises	Arabia Salazar	Episode: "Volver"
2013	Vicente Ferrer	Shamira	TV movie
2013	The Time in Between	Jamila	5 episodes
2014	Cuéntame cómo pasó	La Chelo	Episode: "En la boca del lobo"
2015–2019	Vis a vis	Saray Vargas de Jesús	Main role; 40 episodes
2017–2021	Money Heist	Ágata Jiménez / Nairobi	Main role; 34 episodes
2020	Vis a vis: El Oasis	Saray Vargas de Jesús	Episode: "¿Quién era Zulema Zahir?"
2021	Maricón perdido	Lola	
2022	Sagrada familia (Holy Family)	Caterina	
TBA	Ulterior	Ada	
TBA	Romancero	Tábata	

=== Theater ===
Year	Title	Author	Director
2005	Honeymoon in Hiroshima		Esteve Ferrer
2007	Midsummer Night's Dream	William Shakespeare	Tamzin Townsend
2008	Enamorados “Anonimos"	Olga Iglesias Durán	Blanca Li y Javier Limón
2011	Comedia Y Sueno	William Shakespeare, Federico García Lorca	Juan Carlos Corazza
2016	La Rosa Tatua	Tennessee Williams	Carme Portaceli
2016	Drac Pack	Najwa Nimri, Emilio Tomé y Carlos Dorrego	Fernando Soto
2017	Troyanas	Euripides, versión de Alberto Conejero	Carme Portaceli
2019	La excepción y la regla	Bertolt Brecht	Catalina Lladó

== Accolades ==
Year	Award	Category	Work	Result	Ref.
2015	Ondas Awards	Best Female Performer in Fiction (ex aequo female cast)	Vis a vis	Won	
2016	25th Actors and Actresses Union Awards	Best Supporting Actress in a Television Series	Vis a vis	Nominated	
2017	4th Feroz Awards	Best Supporting Actress in a Television Series	Vis a vis	Nominated	
2017	26th Actors and Actresses Union Awards	Best Supporting Actress in a Television Series	Vis a vis	Won	
2018	21st Iris Awards	Best Actress	Vis a vis	Nominated	
2018	27th Actors and Actresses Union Awards	Best Supporting Actress in Theatre	Troyanas	Nominated	
2018	6th Feroz Awards	Best Supporting Actress in a Television Series	Money Heist	Nominated	
2018	27th Actors and Actresses Union Awards	Best Supporting Actress in a Television Series	Money Heist	Nominated	
2019	21st Iris Awards	Best Actress	Money Heist	Won	
2019	28th Actors and Actresses Union Awards	Best Lead Actress in a Television Series	Money Heist	Nominated	
2019	7th MiM Series Awards	Best Drama Actress	Money Heist	Nominated	
2019	Zapping Awards	Best Actress	Money Heist	Nominated	
2019	Fotogramas de Plata	Best Theatre Actress	La Excepcion Y La Regla	Nominated	
2020	29th Actors and Actresses Union Awards	Best Lead Actress in a Television Series	Money Heist	Nominated	
2020	7th Feroz Awards	Best Supporting Actress in a Television Series	Money Heist	Nominated	
2020	7th Platino Awards	Best Supporting Actress in a Miniseries or TV series	Money Heist	Won	
2021	9th MiM Series Awards	Best Comedy Actress	Maricón Perdido	Nominated	
2022	30th Actors and Actresses Union Awards	Best Stage Actress in a Secondary Role	Shock 2 (La tormenta y la guerra)	Won	
2024	32nd Actors and Actresses Union Awards	Best Television Actress in a Minor Role	Romancero	Nominated	
