= Tokyo (Money Heist) =

Fictional character from Money Heist

- Money Heist character
- First appearance: "Do as Planned" (2017)
- Last appearance: "Pillow Talk" (2021)
- Created by: Álex Pina
- Portrayed by: Úrsula Corberó

In-universe information
- Full name: Silene Oliveira
- Aliases: Tokyo; Trouble (by Moscow); Maserati (by Denver and Rio); Little Rat (by César Gandía)
- Occupation: Thief
- Affiliation: Royal Mint of Spain robbers Bank of Spain robbers
- Weapon: Heckler & Koch MP5 Browning Hi-Power
- Significant others: René (late boyfriend); Río (boyfriend)
- Nationality: Spanish

Tokyo (Silene Oliveira, Spanish: [siˈlene oliˈβejɾa]) is a fictional character in the Netflix series Money Heist, portrayed by Úrsula Corberó. The de facto protagonist of the series, she is the narrator and a runaway robber who is scouted by the Professor to participate in his heists.

== Character biography ==
Tokyo is a young thief on the run from the police after a failed robbery in which her boyfriend was killed. Her mother tried to hand her over to the police before she was involved in the heist, but later died of cardiac arrest, potentially from stress. She was hired by the Professor to help in carrying out a heist of the Royal Mint in Madrid. Together with the other seven robbers chosen for the heist, she is taken to a secluded villa where they plan the heist for five months. The Professor asks each of the robbers to choose a city name to hide their identities during the robbery and she chooses Tokyo. Tokyo is a flirty and rebellious character, and she has a relationship with Rio, that stops and starts throughout the first heist. She shares a good friendship with Nairobi, the two having gotten drunk together many times. She doesn't like being told what to do and shows dislike for Berlin in the first series.

== Development ==
The producers found Tokyo among the hardest characters to develop, as they were originally looking for an older actress to play the character who had nothing to lose before meeting the Professor. Úrsula Corberó eventually landed the role for bringing a playful energy to the role; her voice was heavily factored in during casting, as she was the first voice the audience hears in the show. Corberó described Tokyo at the beginning of the show as "a girl who really lacks self-esteem, has been very lonely, has had a very bad time [and] has not had a father figure at home", resulting in a vulnerability that the character doesn't know how to express. Actor Álvaro Morte (the Professor) regarded Tokyo as one of the Professor's favourite gang members, since both characters confide in and confront each other like best friends despite being opposite sexes.

== Characterisation ==
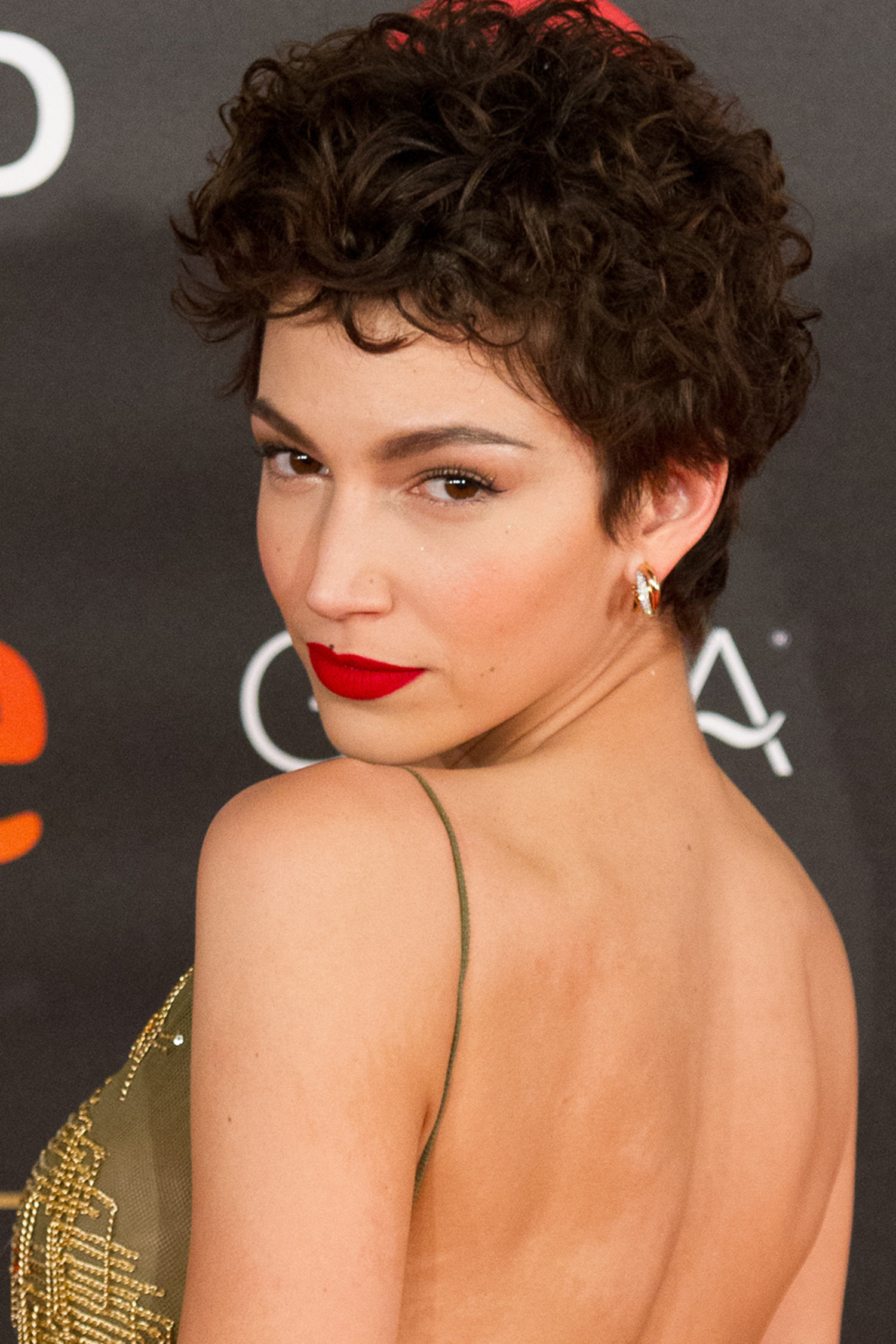
Corberó at the 32nd Goya Awards in 2018.

Sandra Faginas of Spanish newspaper La Razón praised the character, saying Tokyo was "a wonderful cocktail of passion and reason" that was "born splendidly in script". She regarded Tokyo as a "free soul touching every companion and approaching them in different ways: Rio with passionate tenderness, the Professor with cold respect, Nairobi with joy and attunement, and Berlin with challenging discipline". John Doyle of The Globe and Mail saw Corbero "as a strong female lead, her character doesn't conform to much [w]hat you'd see in an equivalent British or American crime drama". Meanwhile, Alfonso Rivadeneyra García of Peruvian newspaper El Comercio disliked the hypersexualization of Tokyo in part 3 as fan service. Keyvan Azh of German Focus regarded Tokyo as a one-dimensional protagonist relying on the "cheap stylistic device" of tell, don't show.

For the role of Tokyo, Corberó was nominated for the Premios Feroz in 2017 in the category Best Leading Actress of a Series, and won the Iris Awards in 2018 for Best Actress.
