= Nairobi (Money Heist) =

Fictional character

- Money Heist character
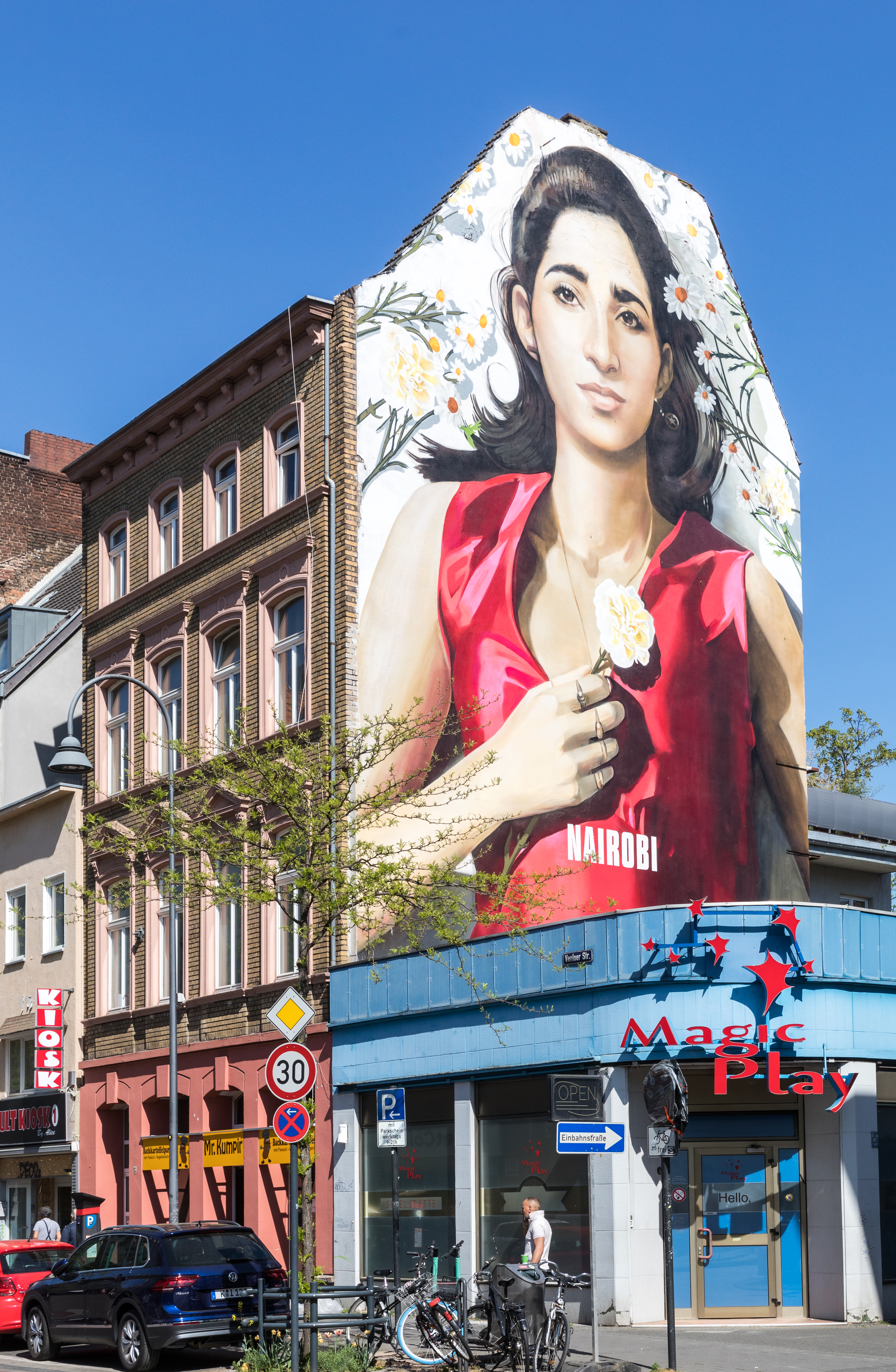
- Mural of Nairobi in Ehrenfeld, Cologne, Germany
- First appearance: "Do as Planned" (2017)
- Last appearance: "A Family Tradition" (2021)
- Created by: Álex Pina
- Portrayed by: Alba Flores

In-universe information
- Full name: Ágata Jiménez
- Occupation: Larcenist
- Children: Axel (son)
- Nationality: Spanish

Nairobi (Ágata Jiménez) is a fictional character in the Netflix series Money Heist, portrayed by Alba Flores. She is the quality manager of the group, in charge of printing money in the Royal Mint of Spain in parts 1 and 2, and overseeing the melting of gold in the Bank of Spain in parts 3 and 4.

== Character biography ==
Before she was recruited by the Professor, Nairobi was an expert counterfeiter and forger, which she learned at an early age due to poverty. She had a son named Axel, of whom she lost custody after serving time in prison for drug trafficking and counterfeiting She has become known for her energetic, charismatic, and motivational persona throughout the show. A born leader, she leads the hostages and her team with joy, passion, and enthusiasm as she uses her popular catchphrase "chikipum chikipum chikipum" (imitating a drum beat) to motivate them to work.

In a team of hotheads and big egos, Nairobi is level-headed, focused only on accomplishing the job and maintaining peace within the group, and staying alive. She is well liked by the team and even the hostages; Mr. Torres, a hostage assigned to help her print the money in parts 1 and 2, praises her as the best boss he has ever had. With her maternal instincts, she was able to sympathize with some of the hostages, such as motivating Alison Parker to stand up to her bullies and say the famous line "Soy la puta ama" ("I am the fucking boss"). Throughout the show, Nairobi shows disgust over the excessive patriarchy on the team, questioning the leadership of Berlin and Palermo's offensive actions. In part 2, when she overthrows Berlin's leadership and temporarily takes control at the Royal Mint, she proudly declares "Empieza el matriarcado" ("Let the matriarchy begin"), a now iconic line for her character.

In part three, in order to sow chaos on the team, inspector Alicia Sierra takes Nairobi's son and uses him to lure her out. Nairobi peeks out through the window to see her son and is shot by a sniper in the chest. Nairobi barely survives the opening of part 4, when the police deny the team a surgeon to help her. With the help of a Pakistani surgeon via video call, Tokyo and the rest of the team successfully operate on Nairobi, removing the bullet and extracting part of her lung.

Soon after, the head of security of the Bank of Spain, an ex-mercenary named Gandia, escapes with the help of Palermo, who had been shunned by his own team of robbers. Nairobi, still recovering from her gunshot and surgery, is taken hostage and tortured by Gandia. After several failed attempts at killing Nairobi, Gandia waits until a truce is called between the robbers and the police, at which point he executes her by shooting her point blank to the head. Her body is placed in a makeshift coffin with the label "Nairobi, La Puta Ama" and carried outside by the governor's bodyguards. In the season finale of part 4, after the Professor and the team managed to get Lisbon into the Bank of Spain, they all chant "Por Nairobi!" (For Nairobi!) in her memory and as an affirmation that they would be victorious in the heist.

=== Relationships ===
Throughout the series Nairobi is shown to be in love with her partner Helsinki, however, no romance ever blooms between them because Helsinki is gay, although they develop a close platonic relationship. Their friendship becomes very close, to the point of deciding to travel together around the world after the robbery of the Royal Mint, in addition to nickname him "osito" (little teddy) as a sign of affection. Helsinki is severely affected when she is murdered, but with the help of Palermo, he manages to appease the anger and sadness that triggers in him after her death.

In the fourth part of the series, her partner Bogotá falls in love with her and they begin a brief romance before her murder. In the Colombian city for which Bogotá is named, in 2021 Netflix placed a statue of both characters for a limited time in the well-known "Parque de los Novios" (Boyfriend's park), this as a tribute to the series and to be visited by the followers of the same.

== Development ==
In an interview, Alba Flores revealed that Nairobi did not exist in the original script. Show creator Álex Pina was writing the script and realized that the team only had one female character in Tokyo, so he called Flores, with whom he had previously worked on the series Locked Up and offered to create a role for her if she enjoyed the scripts of the first two episodes.

== Reception ==
Nairobi's quirky yet level-headed bossy character quickly became one of the favorites of the show. After the character's death in part 4, fans mourned another fan favorite being killed. Some grieved saying that Nairobi did not deserve a brutal death, especially since her character was so full of dreams and promises. A behind-the-scenes video of Flores tearfully saying goodbye to her character and castmates was included in the 2020 documentary Money Heist: The Phenomenon. For her work as Nairobi, Flores won a Best Actress Award in the Premios Iris (ATv), as well as three Best Actress nominations in the Actors and Actresses Union Awards and two Best Supporting Actress nominations for the Feroz Awards.
