= Sky Rojo =

Spanish black comedy action television series

- Genre: Action thriller; Crime drama; Black comedy
- Created by: Álex Pina; Esther Martínez Lobato
- Directed by: Jesús Colmenar; Óscar Pedraza; David Victori; Albert Pintó; Javier Quintas; Eduardo Chapero-Jackson
- Starring: Verónica Sánchez; Miguel Ángel Silvestre; Asier Etxeandia; Lali Espósito; Yany Prado; Enric Auquer; Rauw Alejandro; Catalina Sopelana; Tiago Correa
- Composers: Manel Santisteban; Iván M. Lacámara
- Country of origin: Spain
- Original language: Spanish
- No. of seasons: 3
- No. of episodes: 24

Production
- Executive producers: Álex Pina; Esther Martínez Lobato; Jesús Colmenar
- Producer: Cristina López Ferraz
- Cinematography: David Azcano; Migue Amoedo; David Acereto
- Running time: 22–31 minutes
- Production company: Vancouver Media

Original release
- Network: Netflix
- Release: 19 March 2021 – 13 January 2023

Sky Rojo (transl. Red Leatherette) is a Spanish black comedy action drama television series, created by Álex Pina and Esther Martínez Lobato. The series traces three prostitutes who flee from their pimp. According to the creators, the series shows "the impunity, ambiguity and brutal reality of prostitution, and the psychological portraits of those on both sides of the scale." Pina and Martínez Lobato have described the series as "Latin pulp."

Produced by Vancouver Media and distributed by Netflix, the series premiered on 19 March 2021. Two seasons of eight 25-minute episodes each were announced. The series' second season premiered on 23 July 2021. The third and final season was released on 13 January 2023.

== Premise ==
Coral, Wendy, and Gina, three prostitutes, go on the run in search of freedom while being chased by Romeo, their pimp from Las Novias Club in Tenerife, and his henchmen, Moisés and Christian. Together, the women embark on a chaotic journey during which they face dangers of all kinds and live every second as if it were their last, while strengthening their friendship and discovering that together they are stronger and have more options to recover their lives.

== Cast and characters ==
Legend
= Main cast (credited)
= Recurring cast (2+)
= Guest cast (1)

Character	Portrayed by	Seasons		
Character	Portrayed by	1	2	3
Main
Coral	Verónica Sánchez	Main	Main	Main
Moisés Expósito	Miguel Ángel Silvestre	Main	Main	Main
Romeo	Asier Etxeandia	Main	Main	Main
Wendy	Lali Espósito	Main	Main	Main
Carmen "Gina"	Yany Prado	Main	Main	Main
Christian Expósito	Enric Auquer	Main	Main	
Diego	Rauw Alejandro			Main
Greta	Catalina Sopelana			Main
Darwin	Tiago Correa			Main

=== Main ===
- Verónica Sánchez as Coral, a former biologist who works at Las Novias Club and sees her work as a means to escape from her dark past
- Miguel Ángel Silvestre as Moisés Expósito, one of Romeo's henchmen and Christian's older brother. He recruits women for Romeo and brings them to the club.
- Asier Etxeandia as Romeo, pimp and owner of Las Novias Club
- Lali Espósito as Wendy, a lesbian from Buenos Aires. She flees Villa 31 and becomes a sex worker in the brothel to make money so she can provide a better life for herself and her girlfriend.
- Yany Prado as Gina, a Cuban woman who was sex-trafficked to the club under the guise of accepting a waitressing job to provide for her young child and ailing mother
- Enric Auquer as Christian Expósito (seasons 1–2), one of Romeo's henchmen and Moisés's younger brother

=== Recurring ===
- Carmen Santamaría as Charlotte, the club's madam
- Cecilia Gómez as Gata, a sex worker at the club
- Godeliv Van den Brandt as Rubí, a sex worker at the club
- Penélope Guerrero as Tsunami, a sex worker at the club
- Luisa Vides as Lupe, a sex worker at the club
- Niko Verona as Cachopo, Romeo's assistant
- Chani Martín as Fernando, owner of a motel and client of the club. He has a relationship with Gina.
- Paco Inestrosa as Arcadio
- Iván Yao as Xuan
- Antonio Fdez as Tony, barman at Club Las Novias
- Daniel Prim as Walter, barman

=== Guest ===
- Luis Zahera as Alfredo, veterinarian and client of the club
- Daria Krauzo as Bambi, a sex worker at the club
- Alicia Sánchez as Dolores Expósito, mother of Moisés and Christian
- Yanet Sierra as Gina's mother
- José Manuel Poga as Fermín, a client of the club

== Production ==
Filmed on location in Madrid and Tenerife, Sky Rojo was produced by Vancouver Media for Netflix. Álex Pina and Esther Martínez Lobato are the creators and executive producers of Sky Rojo alongside Jesús Colmenar, with support from co-executive producers David Barrocal, Migue Amoedo and David Victori. The original series is directed by Jesús Colmenar, Óscar Pedraza, David Victori, Albert Pintó, Javier Quintas and Eduardo Chapero-Jackson. The scriptwriting team is made up of Álex Pina, Esther Martínez Lobato, David Barrocal, David Oliva, Javier Gómez Santander, Juan Salvador López and Mercedes Rodrigo. Migue Amoedo has taken the lead as cinematographer alongside David Azcano and David Acereto, while Juan López Olivar and Cristina López Ferraz are heading up production management.

Filming began in Madrid on 18 November 2019, and later moved to Arico, Tenerife. Filming was set to move to Castilla–La Mancha in early 2020 and take place there for approximately four months. However, the project was delayed by the COVID-19 pandemic and filming continued in October 2020 in Madrid. While set in the south of Tenerife, the shooting location of Las Novias club was an estate near Huerta de Valdecarábanos, province of Toledo.

The series is set to last two seasons of eight 25-minutes episodes each. In a joint statement, the creators said: "We wanted Sky Rojo to have the same frenetic action as always, but to use that 25-minute runtime to underline the dynamic nature of the plot: the getaway, the race for survival. The third act of a movie or an episode is where all the energy converges to produce the most vibrant explosion of all the conflicts that are being narrated. What we set out to do was to make a constant third act, to funnel our entire story through that frenzied energy".

On 19 January 2021, it was announced via a teaser trailer that the series' first season would premiere exactly two months later, on 19 March. The series' official trailer was released on 2 March 2021.

== Episodes ==
Series	Episodes	Originally released
1	8	19 March 2021
2	8	23 July 2021
3	8	13 January 2023

=== Season 1 (2021) ===
No. overall	No. in season	Title	Directed by	Written by	Original release date
1	1	"Red Leatherette Sofa" (Spanish: "Sofá de escay rojo")	Jesús Colmenar, David Victori, Óscar Pedraza & Eduardo Chapero-Jackson	Mercedes Rodrigo, Javier Gomez Santander, Esther Martínez Lobato & Álex Pina	19 March 2021
Coral, Wendy and Gina work at the Brides Club, a strip club and brothel in Tenerife owned by ruthless pimp Romeo. On the day Romeo attends his wife's funeral, he calls all the strippers and prostitutes who work at the club into work from a scheduled day of grief. He meets with Gina, who pays him over 5,000 Euros she owes him to secure passage into Tenerife. However, rather than return her passport, Romeo makes up new charges that Gina owes him and makes clear she isn't leaving his employ. Enraged, Gina attacks Romeo, and she is stabbed with a pen in the ensuing scuffle. Coral and Wendy become involved in the fight, during which Coral strikes Romeo over the head and seemingly kills him. The girls flee the club, but Coral persuades them to return and say Romeo attacked Gina. After returning, they are attacked by brothel madam Charlotte, ultimately resulting in Charlotte being accidentally struck and killed by a lorry. Fleeing for a second time, the girls then visit Alfredo, a veterinarian and client of Coral, in order to attend to Gina's wounds from the fight with Romeo. Alfredo says that Gina needs surgery and agrees to carry it out, during which Gina reveals to Alfredo that she is pregnant. Meanwhile, Christian and Moisés, Romeo's henchmen, oversee Romeo's departure in an ambulance.
2	2	"Alternate Reality" (Spanish: "La realidad paralela")	Jesús Colmenar, David Victori, Óscar Pedraza & Eduardo Chapero-Jackson	Mercedes Rodrigo, David Barrocal, Javier Gomez Santander, Esther Martínez Lobato & Álex Pina	19 March 2021
Coral, Wendy and Gina leave Alfredo's clinic after he fixes Gina's wounds, and they take refuge overnight in a furniture store. Coral receives a phone call from Romeo, who survived their assault with wounds that have paralysed the left-hand side of his body. Romeo tells Coral that he will find them and mutilate them as revenge for what happened to him. Christian and Moisés threaten the remaining prostitutes at the Brides Club and accidentally kill Bambi, a dancer misidentified as having information on where Coral, Wendy and Gina might be. Romeo reveals their GPS location to Christian and Moisés whilst the three girls are forced to fight an armed security guard who discovers them in the store. They hinder the guard and escape on a bus but are followed by Christian and Moisés.
3	3	"A Whore's Love" (Spanish: "El amor de las putas")	Javier Quintas & Eduardo Chapero-Jackson	Mercedes Rodrigo, David Barrocal, Javier Gomez Santander, Esther Martínez Lobato & Álex Pina	19 March 2021
As the three women continue their journey on the bus, Coral recalls when she started as a prostitute at Romeo's club, particularly an illicit, intimate relationship with Moisés. Upon arriving at their destination, the women discover that Christian and Moisés are following them, and they hurriedly escape them during a fight between Christian and the bus driver. They make their way to a resort owned by Fernando, a client of Gina's from the club who she says wants to start an honest relationship with her. As Gina goes to find Fernando, Coral slips unconscious after taking drugs from the veterinary surgery and once more begins dreaming about her relationship with Moisés, which ended badly when Moisés told her he shouldn't get close to her given his work for Romeo. Gina speaks to Fernando about their future together and her pregnancy by him, leading Fernando to be mysterious about his promises and instead have sex with her, causing Gina to realise that Fernando was only ever interested in her for sex. After returning to Coral and Wendy, Gina lies by saying that she didn't meet Fernando and then says they don't need his help. Coral returns to consciousness just as Christian and Moisés arrive at the resort.
4	4	"Sex and Blood" (Spanish: "Polvo y sangre")	Javier Quintas, Albert Pintó & Jesús Colmenar	Mercedes Rodrigo, Javier Gomez Santander, David Barrocal, Esther Martínez Lobato & Álex Pina	19 March 2021
Christian and Moisés confront Coral, Wendy and Gina by the pool of Fernando's resort but are forced to retreat by Moisés following a confrontation with Fernando and a security guard. The three women flee before police arrive at the resort and take Christian and Moisés hostage in their car, using weapons they picked up from their fight in the furniture store. They demand that Christian and Moisés drive them to the club so they can recover their passports and flee but en route, Coral senses that the two men are planning to ambush them, resulting in a tense stand-off where Wendy demands Moisés stop the car. It results in Moisés crashing the car and Wendy accidentally shooting her gun, which grazes Christian's neck and sends him into a rage. Christian drags Wendy from the car into a nearby field to execute her and Moisés gets out to talk him down. Gina, out of fear for her unborn baby and believing Wendy won't be killed, uses the opportunity to escape in the car with Coral. Wendy feels betrayed whilst Gina reveals her pregnancy to Coral, stating that the fear of Romeo forcing her to have an abortion prompted her to attack him. Christian attempts to hijack a car so they can pursue Coral and Gina but ends up being accidentally hit by it, leading him to shoot the driver in a drug and anxiety fuelled rage. Seeing Christian's deteriorating mental state, Wendy starts fleeing across the fields.
5	5	"The Escape" (Spanish: "La evasión")	Óscar Pedraza	Juan Salvador López, Javier Gómez Santander, David Barrocal & Álex Pina	19 March 2021
After fleeing Christian and Moisés, Wendy hides in a warehouse on a nearby farm but is soon discovered by the two henchmen. Before Christian and Moisés can kill Wendy, they are surprised and held at gunpoint by a farmer, which allows Wendy to escape, steal Christian's gun and convince the farmer of her story. She calls Coral and Gina, who then arrive at the farm to rescue Wendy. However, Wendy confronts the two for leaving her behind, resulting in a physical fight between Coral and Wendy. After the fight has finished, the women are unable to escape as their stolen car is stuck in the mud. Coral takes the gun and obtains both Moisés' car keys and the code to Romeo's safe at the club, additionally revealing her former intimate relationship with Moisés to Christian at the same time too. As the women escape the farm, Christian and Moisés overpower the farmer and escape as well before he can summon the police.
6	6	"Foxy and Hare" (Spanish: "Liebres o zorra")	Óscar Pedraza	David Oliva, David Barrocal, Esther Martínez Lobato & Álex Pina	19 March 2021
Coral, Gina and Wendy briefly celebrate their newfound freedom from their pursuers. However, as they drive away in the car they stole from Christian and Moisés, they find that Arcadio, the driver who Christian shot and placed into the trunk when stealing the car, is still alive but near death. Wendy protests that they must escape no matter the cost but Coral and Gina decide to take Arcadio to a hospital. Upon arrival, the women encounter an injured Romeo who is being released from the same hospital. An enraged Romeo hijacks an ambulance with his henchman Beefcake and pursues Coral, Wendy and Gina in a high-speed car chase. During the pursuit, the women decide they cannot run any longer and must pursue their captors instead, leading to Coral shooting out the tires of Romeo's ambulance to end the chase. Coral taunts Romeo during a subsequent phone call, with flashbacks during the car chase revealing the extent of Coral's former intimate relationship with Romeo when she acted as a tutor for his daughters during his wife's illness.
7	7	"Thinking with your D**k" (Spanish: "Pensar con la polla")	David Victori, Javier Quintas & Alex Pintó	Juan Salvador López, David Oliva, Javier Gómez Santander, David Barrocal, Esther Martínez Lobato & Álex Pina	19 March 2021
Wendy, Coral and Gina visit Alfredo's clinic again and force him to give medical assistance to the gravely wounded Arcadio. However, Arcadio dies before treatment can be administered. Romeo returns to the Brides Club and plots his next moves with Christian and Moisés, during which Fernando arrives and offers to buy Gina's freedom. Believing that Fernando knows where the women are, Romeo orders Christian and Moisés to torture him for information about their whereabouts. Wendy, Coral and Gina go to a bar near the club and devise a plan to lure Christian and Moisés away from Romeo, so that Coral can steal the club's nightly profits from Romeo's safe. The women steal a digger and motorbike from a nearby construction site as part of their plan, which is to dig a large hole at a construction site, cover it up and then lure Christian and Moisés into it during a chase.
8	8	"Bear Trap" (Spanish: "Trampa de osos")	Óscar Pedraza & David Victori	Juan Salvador López, David Oliva, David Barrocal, Esther Martínez Lobato & Álex Pina	19 March 2021
Just before leaving the bar to carry out their plan, Wendy is sexually assaulted by a former client but does not reveal this to Gina and Coral. Back at the club, Romeo confronts Moisés about sleeping with Coral in the past and demands loyalty from him, referencing a previous incident involving Christian and Moisés' father that Romeo helped cover up. When confronted about this by Christian, Moisés reveals that he killed their father for being violent with their mother, leading to tension between Christian and Moisés as they torture Fernando in a vat of acid. Their arguing results in Fernando accidentally dying during the torture and Romeo orders them to dispose of his body before going out to pursue the women, who have now turned Gina's phone back on so they can be traced. Moisés abandons Christian during the drive, as he believes Christian still has time to escape the criminal life, though Christian still runs after Moisés to join him. Coral returns to the club and is immediately taken to Romeo, who threatens her with a sword, resulting in a fight between the two that ends with Romeo being wounded and suffering a cocaine-induced heart attack. At the construction site, Wendy and Gina successfully make Moisés crash his car into the hole and subsequently bury him alive. However, Wendy is wounded by gunfire from Moisés during this. At the same time, Coral impulsively decides to administer CPR to Romeo, who wakes up and grabs her by the throat.

=== Season 2 (2021) ===
The second season of Sky Rojo was filmed before the first season even premiered. As with the former, the second season also consisted of eight episodes of around 25-five minutes each. On 29 March 2021, it was announced that the second season would premiere on 23 July 2021.

No. overall	No. in season	Title	Directed by	Written by	Original release date
9	1	"Hookers Didn't Kiss on the Lips" (Spanish: Las putas no besaban en la boca)	David Victori	Juan Salvador López, David Oliva, David Barrocal, Esther Martínez Lobato & Álex Pina	23 July 2021
10	2	"The Talent of Wretches" (Spanish: El talento de los miserables)	David Victori	David Oliva, David Barrocal, Esther Martínez Lobato & Álex Pina	23 July 2021
11	3	"Fear Weighs 10,000 Tons" (Spanish: El miedo pesa diez mil toneladas)	Albert Pintó	Marina Velázquez, David Oliva, David Barrocal, Esther Martínez Lobato & Álex Pina	23 July 2021
12	4	"The Night We Were Dead" (Spanish: La noche que estuvimos muertas)	Oscar Pedraza	David Oliva, David Barrocal, Esther Martínez Lobato & Álex Pina	23 July 2021
13	5	"Hookers' Black Boxes" (Spanish: La caja negra de las puta)	David Victori	David Oliva, David Barrocal, Esther Martínez Lobato & Álex Pina	23 July 2021
14	6	"Lobster for Death Row Inmates" (Spanish: Langosta para los condenados)	Albert Pintó	David Oliva, David Barrocal, Esther Martínez Lobato & Álex Pina	23 July 2021
15	7	"Rotten and Radiant" (Spanish: Podridas y radiantes)	Oscar Pedraza	David Oliva, David Barrocal, Esther Martínez Lobato & Álex Pina	23 July 2021
16	8	"Toxic People" (Spanish: Personas tóxicas)	David Victori	David Oliva, David Barrocal, Esther Martínez Lobato & Álex Pina	23 July 2021

=== Season 3 (2023) ===
On 12 August 2021, it was announced that the series had been renewed for a third and final season. Asier Etxeandia, who plays Romeo, confirmed that the season was scheduled to begin filming in November 2021. In February 2022, Lali Espósito, who plays Wendy, announced in El Hormiguero that Rauw Alejandro will appear on the third and final season of Sky Rojo.

No. overall	No. in season	Title	Directed by	Written by	Original release date
17	1	"Getting Into Heaven Through the Back Door" (Spanish: Entrar al cielo por la puerta de atrás)	David Barrocal	David Barrocal, Esther Martínez Lobato & Álex Pina	January 13, 2023
18	2	"The Line That Separates Us" (Spanish: La raya que nos separa)	David Barrocal	David Barrocal, Esther Martínez Lobato & Álex Pina	January 13, 2023
19	3	"The Lucky Cat" (Spanish: El gato de la suerte)	Oscar Pedraza	David Olva, David Barrocal, Esther Martínez Lobato & Álex Pina	January 13, 2023
20	4	"Diesel, Saltpeter, and Gunpowder" (Spanish: Gasoil, salitre y pólvora)	Carles Torrens	David Olva, David Barrocal, Esther Martínez Lobato & Álex Pina	January 13, 2023
21	5	"Jesus Was Right" (Spanish: Jesucristo tenía razón)	Carles Torrens	David Olva, David Barrocal, Esther Martínez Lobato & Álex Pina	January 13, 2023
22	6	"Ambushing the Embryo" (Spanish: Emboscar al embrión)	Oscar Pedraza	David Olva, David Barrocal, Esther Martínez Lobato & Álex Pina	January 13, 2023
23	7	"Helplessness and Ice Hockey" (Spanish: Desamparo y hockey sobre hielo)	David Barrocal, Jorge Calvo & Oscar Pedraza	David Olva, David Barrocal, Esther Martínez Lobato & Álex Pina	January 13, 2023
24	8	"Gold, Frankincense, and Lead" (Spanish: Oro, incienso y plomo)	David Barrocal, Oscar Pedraza	David Olva, David Barrocal, Esther Martínez Lobato & Álex Pina	January 13, 2023

== Reception ==
=== Public response ===
During its premiere weekend, Sky Rojo was the fourth most watched show on Netflix globally, and the most watched non-English language show in the world. It also was the most watched show in Argentina, Spain, Brazil, Colombia, Cyprus, the Dominican Republic, Greece, Israel, Jamaica, Paraguay, Switzerland, Turkey, Uruguay, and Venezuela, while reaching the top ten in sixty-one countries.

American business magazine Forbes reported that Sky Rojo was the most watched show in Spain the day after its release, outperforming Disney+'s The Falcon and the Winter Soldier (the platform's most-watched series premiere ever during its opening weekend) in that territory. According to TV Time, early performance data for Sky Rojo during its release weekend, from 9 March to 21 March, showed that the series entered the Top 5 for most-watched subscription video on demand originals across key European, Middle Eastern, African and Latin American markets. Sheena Scott of Forbes wrote that "with Argentine superstar Lali Espósito starring in the series, it is no surprise that Sky Rojo also topped Netflix's chart as the number one TV show in Argentina during its launching weekend". In the United States and the United Kingdom, however, Sky Rojo never entered the Top 10 TV shows chart on Netflix during its release weekend, despite receiving some favorable reviews from critics.

=== Critical response ===
Professional ratings
Aggregate scores
Source	Rating
Rotten Tomatoes	92%
Review scores
Source	Rating
Common Sense Media	4/5 stars
The Guardian	4/5 stars
LetsOTT	3.5/5 stars
NME	3/5 stars
Radio Times	4/5 stars
What To Watch	4.5/5 stars

Sky Rojo was met with a very positive response from critics. The review aggregator website Rotten Tomatoes gave Sky Rojo an approval rating of 92% for the first season based on 13 reviews, with an average rating of 7.4/10. The website's critics consensus states, "Sky Rojo's depiction of sexual exploitation sometimes blurs the lines of good taste, but magnetic performances and a propulsive pace give this pulpy series a serious kick." Multiple critics compared the series' cinematography with the films of Quentin Tarantino. Elizabeth Vincentelli of The New York Times described the series as "sheer excess" for its "simultaneously minimal and over the top" plot. Ellen E. Jones of The Guardian gave the series' first season four stars out of five and wrote: "Sky Rojo's punchy 25-minute runtime is never long enough to truly try the patience. Those wild cliffhanger endings should have you slamming "next episode" faster than Coral slams the accelerator at a busy intersection". NME's James McMahon gave the show three stars out of five and dubbed the show "cool" and "exciting", highlighting its "great music and solid performances". Juan Sanguno from El País wrote that "Sky Rojo turns every punch, every humiliation, and every threat into a triumph."

Sky Rojo often got compared to Money Heist, with which it shared creators. In her review, Keyla Cobb of Decider wrote that those who loved Money Heist will love Sky Rojo since "both dramas look gorgeously slick, perfectly crumpling their on-the-run characters enough to look worn but still sexy" while also singling out both shows' convergence in their "dedication to humanity". Cobb concluded that "Sky Rojo feels like a successor to Money Heist". The reviewer also compared the series to other TV shows like Good Girls, Big Sky and Fargo since they all revolve around "panicked people who did something wrong and are now being chased by a nefarious force far more powerful than them".

Valerie Ettenhofer of Film School Rejects highlighted Sky Rojo's "unique blend of dark humor, serious violence, and heightened drama". However, she wrote that the show is "neither as deep nor as clever as it thinks it is, but the thriller seems more concerned with being addictive than being perfect, and on that front, it succeeds". She criticized Moisés and Christian's "obnoxious amount of screen time" since "their frequent scenes are repetitive, unfocused, and not nearly as engaging as anything involving the women they're after", and that their scenes seem like mere "attempts to humanize the villains". Ultimately, Ettenhofer said that "Sky Rojo's greatest strengths are its lead [actresses and actors]". David Craig of Radio Times highlighted Verónica Sánchez's "strong" performance and gave the show four out of five stars. Craig wrote: "on paper, Sky Rojo sounds as if it should be a rather bleak affair but, for the most part, the series avoids becoming too heavy by balancing its serious themes with a pulpy sense of humour". Lali Espósito's performance was also singled out by many critics, with Trae Delellis of Miami New Times dubbing it as "mesmerizing and affecting".

=== Accolades ===
Award	Date of ceremony	Category	Recipient(s)	Result	Ref.
BreakTudo Awards	15 November 2023	International TV Series (Série Internacional)	Sky Rojo	Nominated	
