= Emika Kamieda =

Emika Kamieda 上枝 恵美加
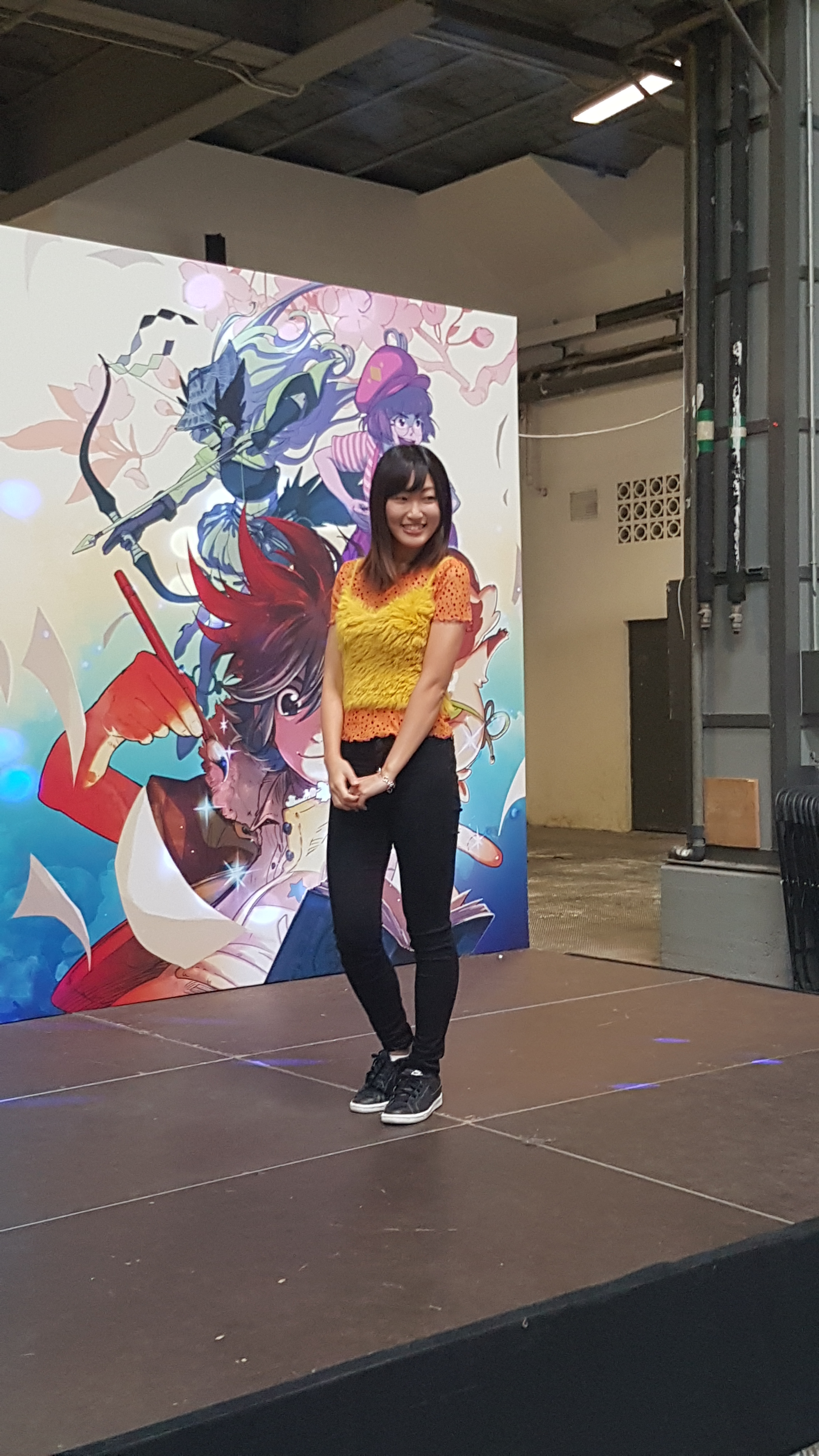
- Emika Kamieda in a fan photo event in 2017

Background information
- Also known as: えみち (Emichi)
- Born: July 13, 1994 (age 32); Osaka Prefecture, Japan
- Genres: J-pop
- Occupations: Japanese idol; singer; actress
- Instruments: Vocals; Piano
- Years active: 2012–present
- Label: King Records (AKB48)
- Formerly of: NMB48
- Website: emikakamieda.com

Emika Kamieda (上枝 恵美加, Kamieda Emika; born 13 July 1994 in Osaka) is a Japanese actress and a former member of the Japanese idol group NMB48.

== Career ==
She auditioned for AKB48 and, after becoming a reserve, she was recommended for NMB48's third-generation members. She passed the audition and became the first captain of the newly founded Team BII in 2012.

In 2013, in the Janken Taikai, she got the second position which granted her to appear in a single for AKB48.

In March 2015 she announced she would be taking a hiatus of her activities as an idol in order to focus on her studies and going abroad. After a six-month pause she joined back his team in October 2015. She graduated from community college in 2016.

After the general NMB48 shuffle of late 2016, Kamieda was appointed member of Team M.

In 2017 she started hosting a radio program twice a month with Anna Ijiri (former vice-captain of Team BII) called Unlimited.

In order to pursue her acting career, on July 2, 2017, she announced her graduation making the stage performance of July 31 her last appearance as an NMB48 member.

In March 2023, she announced that she had signed with Is.Field, which also manages former AKB48 member Aki Takajo.

== Personal life ==
Kamieda's hobbies are horse-back riding, One Piece, beatboxing, and dancing.

She can speak English fluently (as seen in co-hosting the show Tanieda English 谷枝イングリッシュ with Airi Tanigawa), and has studied on a short-term period exchange in Australia, she can use Spanish and Catalan to some extent since she is currently living in Barcelona, Catalonia, Spain.

On November 29, 2025, she announced her marriage to a Spanish man.

== Appearances ==
=== TV ===
- "NHK Rekishi Hiwa Historia" (2016)
- "Tanieda English" (2016-2017)
- "Getting Dirty in Japan" (2025)

=== Streaming Drama ===
- El Refugio Atómico（English：Billonaires' Bunker）（Japanese：ビリオネアズ･シェルター） Act as Haiku（2025 Netflix series）

=== Variety ===
- "Manubu-kun"

=== Movie ===
- "Aichaku" (2024)

=== Radio ===
- "Unlimited" (Kiss-radio) 12 programs. (2017). With Anna Ijiri.

=== Concerts ===
with NMB48

- AKB48 Request Hour Set List Best 21 (May 22, 2014)

== Bibliography ==
=== Magazines ===
- Big Comic Spirits, Shogakukan. November Issue, 2013
