= Miguel Ángel Silvestre =

Spanish actor (born 1982)

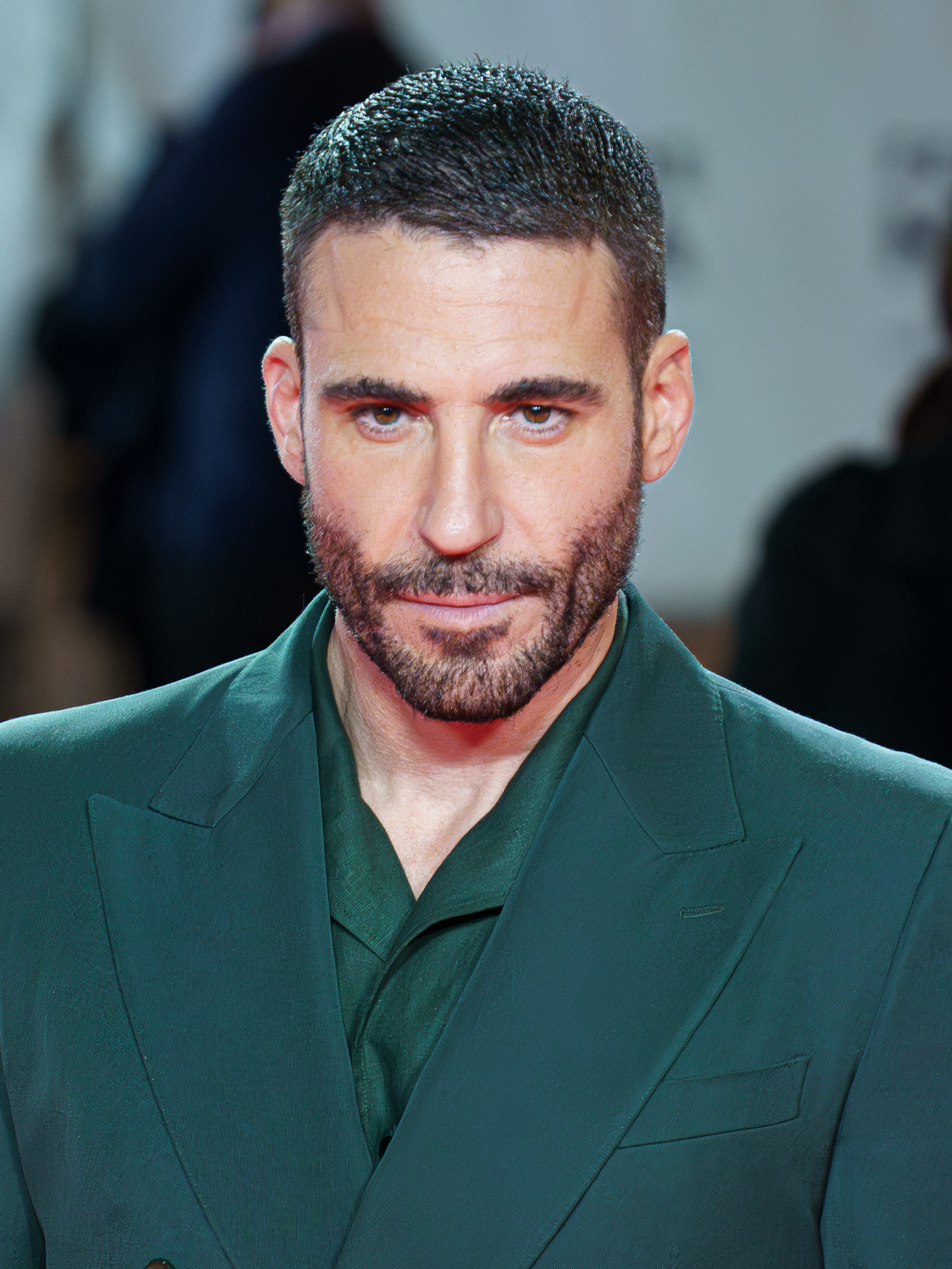
- Silvestre in 2025
- Born: Miguel Ángel Silvestre Rambla; 6 April 1982 (age 44); Castellón de la Plana, Spain
- Occupation: Actor
- Years active: 2004–present

Miguel Ángel Silvestre Rambla (born 6 April 1982) is a Spanish actor. He rose to prominence with his performance as El Duque in Sin tetas no hay paraíso.

He has since played roles in series such as Velvet, Sense8, En el corredor de la muerte, Narcos, 30 Coins and Sky Rojo.

== Early life ==
Miguel Ángel Silvestre Rambla was born in Castellón de la Plana on 6 April 1982. He is the son of a bank manager and of Miguel Ángel Silvestre Vara, a physiotherapist. He planned on becoming a professional tennis player before suffering an injury to his shoulder in a Hungarian tournament. He later decided to study physiotherapy until his aunt introduced him to the world of theatre.

He studied drama, physical theatre, modern dance and acrobatics before winning the Mister Castelló 2002 pageant.

== Career ==
Silvestre made his feature film debut in the 2005 drama Life and Colour.

He stars in the Pedro Almodóvar film I'm So Excited and in the Spanish horror thriller Verbo. He also starred in the Spanish series Velvet as Alberto Marquez.

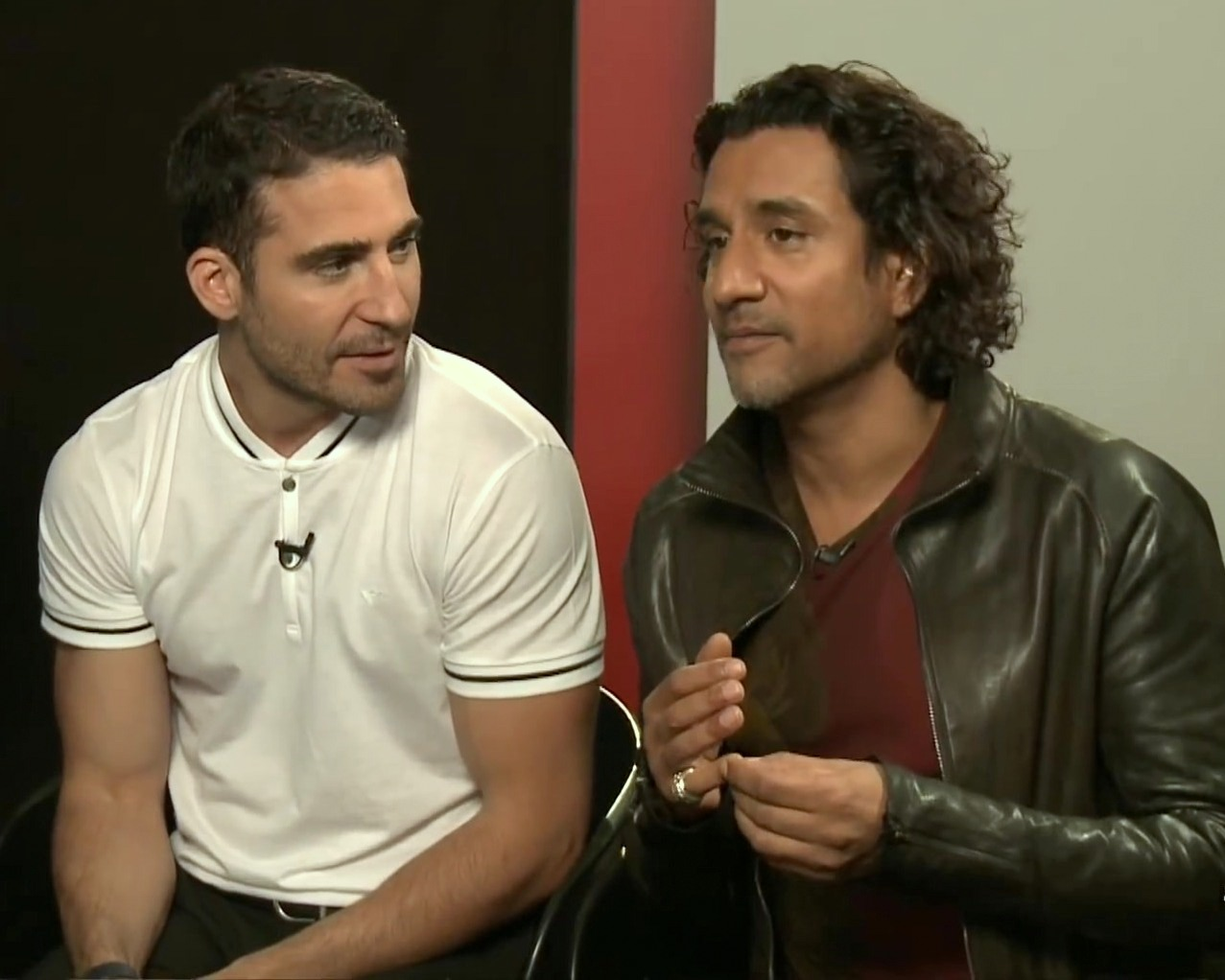
Silvestre and Sense8 co-star Naveen Andrews

In 2015, the high-profile English-language Netflix drama Sense8 was released, in which Miguel plays one of the lead characters, a closeted action movie star named Lito Rodríguez, who lives in Mexico City with his boyfriend, Hernando (played by Alfonso Herrera).

In 2017, he joined the cast of Netflix series Narcos playing recurring character and real life consultant for the Cali Cartel, Franklin Jurado.

In 2018, he acted in the film Ibiza on Netflix, in which he played Manny.

In 2019 he starred in the Mexican film La boda de mi mejor amigo (My best friend's wedding), an adaptation of the 1997 film by the same name. He also starred in the miniseries En el corredor de la muerte from Movistar+.

In 2020, he starred as one of the protagonists of the HBO blockbuster 30 monedas (30 coins), created by Álex de la Iglesia.

In 2021, he starred in both seasons of the Netflix series Sky Rojo, created by Álex Pina. Also, he confirmed that he had joined the main cast for the fifth season of La casa de papel (Money Heist), also created by Álex Pina, which was released globally on Netflix in 2021. He plays René, Tokio's (Úrsula Corberó) ex-partner. He also announced his role as the protagonist of the Mexican series Los enviados, the first series by ViacomCBS together with the Argentinian director and screenwriter Juan José Campanella.

The miniseries Weiss & Morales was filmed in 2024, a procedural series (in which the episodes are self-contained), in which he played detective Raúl Morales. The series was released on 23 May 2025 on the La 1 channel of Televisión Española.

== Filmography ==
=== Film ===
Key
†	Denotes films that have not yet been released

Year	Title	Role	Notes	Ref.
2005	Vida y color (Life and Colour)	Javi		
2005	A golpes (By Force)	Yuri		
2006	La distancia (The Distance)	Daniel		
2007	Dolly	Nacho	Short film	
2008	3:19	Ilan		
2008	Cuando caen los ídolos	Roberto, aged 27	Short film	
2008	Zhao	Martín		
2008	Reflections	Marco / Roberto		
2008	The End	Gas station attendant		
2010	La trampa de la luz	Giocondo		
2011	Verbo	Líriko		
2011	Lo mejor de Eva (Dark Impulse)	Rocco		
2012	Winning Streak	Alfredo	Spanish: The Pelayos	
2012	Todo es silencio (All Is Silence)	Brinco		
2013	I'm So Excited	Novio	Spanish: Los amantes pasajeros	
2013	Alacrán enamorado (Scorpion in Love)	Luis		
2017	Ferdinand	El Primero (voice)		
2018	Ibiza	Manny		
2019	La boda de mi mejor amigo	George		
2026	La fiera			
TBD	La reina †	Jero		

=== Television ===
Year	Title	Role	Notes
2004	Mis adorables vecinos	Monitor	Episode: "No sé decir no" (S01, E02)
2005	Motivos personales	Nacho	13 episodes
2008–2009	Sin tetas no hay paraíso	El Duque	Main role (seasons 1–2); 28 episodes
2010	Alakrana	Capitán	Miniseries, Lead role
2012	Aída	Actor	Episode: "La verdad sobre perros y cacos" (S09, E21)
2013–2016	Velvet	Alberto Márquez Navarro	Main role
2015–2018	Sense8	Lito Rodríguez	Main role
2017	Narcos	Franklin Jurado	Recurring role; 5 episodes
2019	En el corredor de la muerte	Pablo Ibar	Main role; 4 episodes
2019	Velvet Colección	Alberto Márquez Navarro	Special episode
2020–present	30 Coins	Paco	
2021–2023	Los Enviados	Simón Antequera	Main role
2021–2023	Sky Rojo	Moisés Expósito	Main role
2021	Money Heist	René	Guest role; 3 episodes
2025	Weiss & Morales	Raúl Morales	Main role

== Theater ==
Year	Title	Writer	Director
2002	Verdadero Oeste	Sam Shepard	Luis Guilera
2003	Porno	Mario Fratti	Angela Bosch
2004	Noches de amor efímero	Paloma Pedrero	Eduardo Recabarren

== Accolades ==
Year	Award	Category	Work	Result	Ref.
2009	18th Actors and Actresses Union Awards	Best New Actor	Sin tetas no hay paraíso	Nominated	
2014	23rd Actors and Actresses Union Awards	Best Film Actor in a Minor Role	Scorpion in Love	Nominated	
2020	7th Feroz Awards	Best Main Actor in a Series	En el corredor de la muerte	Nominated	
2020	29th Actors and Actresses Union Awards	Best Television Actor in a Leading Role	En el corredor de la muerte	Nominated	
2024	32nd Actors and Actresses Union Awards	Best Actor in an International Production	Los enviados	Nominated	
