= The Distance (film) =

- Theatrical release poster
- Spanish: La distancia
- Directed by: Iñaki Dorronsoro
- Screenplay by: Iñaki Dorronsoro
- Starring: Miguel Ángel Silvestre; Jose Coronado; Federico Luppi; Belén López; Lluís Homar
- Cinematography: Daniel Aranyó
- Edited by: Fernando Pardo
- Music by: Alex Martínez
- Production companies: Ábaco Movies; Madridsur Producciones; 2Y4 Films
- Distributed by: Filmax
- Release dates: 23 September 2006 (Zinemaldia); 29 September 2006 (Spain)
- Country: Spain
- Language: Spanish

The Distance (Spanish: La distancia) is a 2006 Spanish boxing-themed neo-noir thriller film directed and written by Iñaki Dorronsoro in his feature film debut. It stars Miguel Ángel Silvestre and Belén López alongside José Coronado, Federico Luppi, and Lluís Homar.

== Plot ==
The plot tracks the plight of Daniel, a young boxer (and an inmate) experiencing personal guilt for killing a man (Salgado) in prison in a hit job. He is subject to the blackmail and overarching control exercised by corrupt homosexual cop Guillermo, refractory to coming out. Upon leaving prison, Daniel falls romantically for Raquel, Salgado's widow as well as a former hooker, whilst Daniel's boxing coach and a police officer digging into the Salgado case also come into action.

== Cast ==
- Miguel Ángel Silvestre as Daniel
- Belén López as Raquel
- José Coronado as Guillermo
- Federico Luppi
- Lluís Homar
- Carlos Kaniowsky as Salgado
- Julio Vélez
- Andrés Herrera
- José Luis Santos
- Enrique Villén

== Production ==
The screenplay was penned by Iñaki Dorronsoro. The film was produced by Ábaco Movies, Madrid Sur, and 2Y4 Films, and it had the participation of TVE, and Canal+. It was shot in 2005 in Palencia's former provincial prison, the Campo de la Juventud sports center, as well as several locations in Madrid.

== Release ==
The film screened in the 'Zabaltegi-New Directors' slate of the 54th San Sebastián International Film Festival on 23 September 2006. Distributed by Filmax, it was theatrically released in Spain on 29 September 2006.

== Reception ==
Jonathan Holland of Variety deemed the film to be a "polished, well-plotted noir item that provides all the thrills, though it clings too desperately to genre stereotypes".

Mirito Torreiro of Fotogramas rated the film 3 out of 5 stars highlighting the discovery of Miguel Ángel Silvestre and the direction of actors as the best things about the film, while citing the plot playing a bit too much on the viewer's goodwill as a negative point.

Javier Ocaña of El País considered that the film, "skillfully made and with dialogues of a certain level", "is a product as entertaining as it is solvent".

== Accolades ==
| Year | Award | Category | Nominee(s) | Result | Ref. |
|---|---|---|---|---|---|
| 2007 | 16th Actors and Actresses Union Awards | Best New Actress | Belén López | Nominated | |

== See also ==
- List of Spanish films of 2006
