= El embarcadero =

Spanish television series

- Genre: Drama
- Created by: Álex Pina; Esther Martínez Lobato
- Directed by: Jesús Colmenar; Álex Rodrigo; Jorge Dorado; Eduardo Chapero-Jackson
- Starring: Álvaro Morte; Verónica Sánchez; Irene Arcos; Cecilia Roth; Roberto Enríquez; Marta Milans; Antonio Garrido; Paco Manzanedo; Miquel Fernández; Judit Ampudia
- Country of origin: Spain
- Original language: Spanish
- No. of seasons: 2
- No. of episodes: 16

Production
- Running time: variable, mostly around 50 minutes
- Production companies: Movistar+; Atresmedia Studios; Beta Film; Vancouver Media

Original release
- Network: Movistar+
- Release: 18 January 2019 – 17 January 2020

El embarcadero (The Pier) is a Spanish drama television series created by Álex Pina and Esther Martínez Lobato. It was produced by Atresmedia Studios and Vancouver Media for Movistar+. The first season was released on Movistar+ on 18 January 2019. The second and final season, consisting of 8 episodes, was released on 17 January 2020.

== Premise ==
Alejandra (Verónica Sánchez) is a high-profile architect in Valencia who is shattered by the secrets left behind by the death of Óscar, her husband of 15 years. She discovers he was leading a double-life with another woman, Veronica, in a nearby village in the Albufera lagoon. She decides to approach the woman under another identity to discover why her husband lived a lie and what really happened on the fateful night of his death.

The series is set in city of Valencia and the nearby Albufera.

== Cast ==
- Álvaro Morte as Óscar
- Verónica Sánchez as Alejandra
- Irene Arcos as Verónica
- Roberto Enríquez as Conrado
- Marta Milans as Katia
- Judit Ampudia as Ada
- Antonio Garrido as Big Boss
- Miquel Fernández as Fran
- Paco Manzanedo as Vicent
- with Cecilia Roth as Blanca

== Episodes ==
=== Season 1 ===
No.	Title	Directed by	Original release date
1	"Episodio 1"	Jesús Colmenar	January 18, 2019
Alejandra is a successful architect in Valencia and is in a loving marriage to Oscar, who goes to Frankfurt every week for work. Her whole world comes crashing down when she gets a phone call from Lieutenant Conrado that Oscar's body was found in a nearby lagoon town, Albufera. Devastated and confused, she seeks answers and finds out that Oscar had a whole other life in Albufera. Moreover, she discovers from the videos on his phone that he had loving relationship with another woman, Veronica. Furious and in mourning, she decides to scatter his ashes in Albufera and ultimately tries to find where Oscar lived in Albufera, encountering Veronica screaming out of frustration from far away. Veronica confesses that her lover of 8 years has just died, and Alejandra introduces herself as "Martina".
2	"Episodio 2"	Álex Rodrigo	January 18, 2019
Flashbacks reveal how Oscar met Veronica, and Alejandra obsessively analyses Oscar's texts with Veronica and herself, unable to accept that Oscar was in love with someone else. This gets in the way of her work, and her best friend Katia recommends that she focus on work for a big project. Blanca, Alejandra's mother, is a novelist looking for a new story. Alejandra heads to Albufera and ends up accidentally hitting Veronica's car. She brings "Martina" back to her house to clean up a minor injury, and learns that Oscar had a daughter, Sol, with Veronica.
3	"Episodio 3"	Jesús Colmenar and Álex Rodrigo	January 18, 2019
More investigations reveal how Oscar balanced two whole separate lives with suspicious means. Alejandra, encouraged to attend therapy by her friends and family, continues posing as "Martina", a bird biologist, and starts to get to know Veronica and Sol while seeing traces of Oscar's life in Albufera. Conrado finds "Martina" at Veronica's house and plays along.
4	"Episodio 4"	Álex Rodrigo	January 18, 2019
As Alejandra finds out more about Veronica's relationship with Oscar, she finds suspicious bank documents amongst his things in the house. Conrado reveals that he is a widower at group therapy. "Martina" and Veronica decide to have a ceremonial funeral for Oscar for Sol's sake. Alejandra finds herself feeling conflicted and confused that she is happy in Albufera.
5	"Episodio 5"	Jorge Dorado	January 18, 2019
Veronica tells "Martina" that she has to go into the city to hear Oscar's will. She almost goes to Oscar and Alejandra's house while Alejandra is inside, but "Martina" encourages her not to. Alejandra and Conrado investigate more of Oscar's suspicious business deals, while Veronica's home gets robbed. Alejandra finds out how much more sexually adventurous Oscar was with Veronica. Alejandra begs Katia to pretend to be her at the office when Veronica tells "Martina" that she was going to Valencia to apologise to Oscar's wife. Oscar's will gives Alejandra a horse called "Valiente", and finds a letter from him confessing about Veronica and Sol. In attempts to comfort an upset "Martina", Veronica asks if she wants to sleep in her bed.
6	"Episodio 6"	Álex Rodrigo	January 18, 2019
On edge, Alejandra finally calls her friends and mother to come pick her up at Veronica's house. Ada comforts Alejandra about Oscar's love was true for both her and Veronica. Sol wonders if "Martina" will come back. Conrado finds more information that hints Oscar's death might have been a murder.
7	"Episodio 7"	Jorge Dorado	January 18, 2019
Conrado starts interrogating Oscar's associates in Albufera for information. Katia has drama at the office for sleeping with her boss. Alejandra confronts the strip club owner, Andres, with Blanca, to talk about Oscar's business with him. Conrado has a romantic moment with Alejandra, and "Martina" returns to the house. Fran, Oscar's friend, is threatened by some thugs.
8	"Episodio 8"	Álex Rodrigo	January 18, 2019
Veronica's anguish as "the other woman" is put into perspective. For Sol's birthday, "Martina" brings Valiente the horse to Albufera and arranges a big party for her. Katia finds out that Ada is having an affair with a school teacher. Conrado upsets Veronica by revealing some hard-truths about Oscar's many secrets. Veronica storms to confront Andres to confirm suspicions about Oscar. She jumps into the sea angrily and Alejandra fears for her life and jumps in after her. They bond in bed and become intimate, only for "Martina" to reveal who she really is.

=== Season 2 ===
No.	Title	Directed by	Original release date
1	"Episodio 1"	Alex Rodrigo	January 17, 2020
After a confusing night. "Martina" finally tells Veronica who really she is. Conrad shows signs of rage, while Alejandra discovers that Blanca has taken a thinly veiled creative interpretation of recent events. Alejandra can't stay away from Albufera, and the two women reconcile. They discover that Oscar had a third life neither of them knew about in Taracuellos.
2	"Episodio 2"	Jorge Dorado	January 17, 2020
Veronica reveals she broke up with Oscar shortly before his death. There are major clients to impress at the architecture firm, and Katia tells Alejandra that she's pregnant with their boss' baby. Vicente asks Veronica for help regarding Oscar's shady dealings, especially one about Andres' blue book. Conrado wants to start a relationship with Alejandra, who lies to him about her true feelings for Veronica. Veronica and Sol repaint Oscar's car pink.
3	"Episodio 3"	Jorge Dorado	January 17, 2020
After a night of dancing with Fran, Alejandra receives a visit. Arab clients come to the firm to hear Alejandra and Katia's pitch on a high-stakes building project. Ada's suffers from cyberbullying. Blanca apologises for her insensitivity about her novel, while Fran confesses his love for Alejandra. Katia discusses her pregnancy with the father of her child, and Alejandra tries to embrace her wild side. Veronica finds secrets in a tin box regarding Taracuellos.
4	"Episodio 4"	Eduardo Chapero-Jackson	January 17, 2020
Despite being with Conrado, Alejandra's feelings for Veronica intensify. Fran and Katia wake up in bed together. Veronica finds out more about "Mario" and gives Conrado some important evidence. Both Veronica and Alejandra tell each other more about the events leading up to Oscar's death. Veronica admits that she doesn't want to be a mistress anymore. As a favour to Alejandra's friends, Conrado goes to Ada's school to scare the bullies into showing themselves. Ada promises herself she won't continue seeing her teacher. Unable to accept an open relationship, Conrado tells Alejandra he wants to be exclusive.
5	"Episodio 5"	Eduardo Chapero-Jackson	January 17, 2020
Fran and Vicente are in danger because of Veronica's rash actions. Flashbacks show important details about Oscar's relationship with his best friends and business partners. Andres threatens Conrado, who becomes suspicious of all the men involved. Jealous of Conrado and tired of being "the other woman", Veronica tells Alejandra that she must choose who is more important to her. Alejandra feels bad for lying to Conrado and confesses that she has feelings for Veronica. Respectfully, he breaks up with her, but flies into a fit of frenzy.
6	"Episodio 6"	Alex Rodrigo	January 17, 2020
Conrado beats up Vicente for unresolved past conflicts, and the two women take care of him after a mental breakdown. Alejandra is shocked to learn that Conrado is bipolar. It is revealed that Oscar had proposed to Veronica at one point, saying that they are both equally the loves of his life. Katia tells her colleagues that she is pregnant, which her boss tries to side-step. Vicente's body is found floating in the ocean. Veronica brings Alejandra to confront Andres about killing Oscar.
7	"Episodio 7"	Eduardo Chapero-Jackson	January 17, 2020
Veronica and Alejandra find that there's no turning back after a moment of rashness. Conrado discovers more about Oscar's life in Taracuellos and a large sum of money he left behind. After a series of violent interrogations with various associates of Andres and Oscar, Conrado finally gets the truth about Oscar's last night from Fran.
8	"Episodio 8"	Jorge Dorado	January 17, 2020
Authorities find Andres car on the road. Veronica and Alejandra reassure each other about their plans. Andres threatens Sol, which unsettles Veronica. They call Conrado for help, who tells them the truth about Oscar's death and kills Andres for personal revenge. Katia has a serious discussion with her boss along with Ada. Blanca decides to publish a story called "El Embarcadero". Oscar's true feelings about his relationships are revealed, and Alejandra and Veronica's lives are changed forever.

== Awards and nominations ==
Year	Award	Category	Nominee(s)	Result	Ref.
2019	7th MiM Series Awards	Best Drama Series		Won	
2019	7th MiM Series Awards	Best Drama Actress	Irene Arcos	Nominated	
2019	7th MiM Series Awards	Best Drama Actor	Álvaro Morte	Nominated	
2020	29th Actors Union Awards	Best New Actress	Irene Arcos	Won	
