= Motivos personales =

- Also known as: Personal Reasons
- Genre: Thriller
- Written by: Diana Laffond Yges; Javier Holgado; Carlos Vila
- Directed by: Salvador Calvo; Ignacio Mercero; Juan Gonzalez Gabriel; Rafael Monleon; Cesar Rodriguez Blanco
- Starring: Lydia Bosch; Marta Calvó; Daniel Freire; Pedro Casablanc; Ana Gracia; Sonia Castelo; Belén López; Toni Martinez; Elena Ballesteros; Jan Cornet; Alex Gonzalez; Begoña Maestre; Miguel Angel Silvestre; Mario Casas; With the collaboration Concha Velasco; Fernando Guillén; Ginés García Millán
- Music by: Víctor Reyes
- Country of origin: Spain
- Original language: Spanish
- No. of seasons: 2
- No. of episodes: 27

Production
- Producers: Gregorio Quintana; Diana Laffond Yges; Javier Vila; Carlos Holgado
- Cinematography: Macari Golferichs
- Running time: 70 minutes
- Production companies: Round Productions; Globomedia; Picasso's Studio

Original release
- Network: Telecinco
- Release: February 1 – December 13, 2005

Motivos Personales was a Spanish-language mystery thriller television series produced by Round Productions, Globomedia and Picasso's Studio and distributed by Warner Bros.' international unit. The show ran for 2 seasons between February 1 and December 13, 2005, and was broadcast on Telecinco for the entirety of its run.

== Synopsis ==
The story begins on the feast commemorating the 50th anniversary of the Acosta Laboratories. All seems well until the secretary of the president of the laboratories, Mara Yimou appears dead against a glass ceiling inside the building. At first, evidence indicates that the culprit is the husband of journalist Natalia Nadal, Arturo Acosta. At trial he is found guilty and thrown in prison. Natalia later learns from a video that the judgement was based on false evidence and will tell her husband in jail, but she finds that her husband had committed suicide. From this moment, Natalia begins to investigate with her friend Virginia, attorney of the laboratories, and together they're drawn into a complicated network of secrets and crimes. The causes of deaths go back many years back and are the result of a cold revenge on Natalia.

== Cast ==
=== Main characters ===
- Lydia Bosch - Natalia Nadal (Arthur Acosta's widow) (journalist) protagonist
- Marta Calvó - Virginia Palazón / Victoria Castellanos (Acosta Laboratories's attorney) antagonist
- Pedro Casablanc - Pablo Acosta (Federico's son) antagonist
- Ginés García Millán - Fernando Acosta (Federico's son)
- Fernando Guillén - Federico Acosta (President of Acosta Laboratories)
- Concha Velasco - Aurora Acosta (Federico's sister) Antagonist

=== Recurring characters ===
- Daniel Freire - Daniel Garralda (journalist Natalia's friend)
- Belén López - Maite Valcárcel (reporter Natalia's friend)
- Ana Gracia - Berta Pedraza de Acosta (Pablo Acosta's wife)
- Begoña Maestre - Tania Acosta Nadal (Natalia and Arthur's daughter)
- James Meléndez - Alberto Pazos (partner of Acosta Laboratories)
- Eugene Barona - Larranz (police)
- Jan Cornet - Jaime Acosta Pedraza (Paul and Berta's son)
- Miguel Angel Silvestre/Alex Gonzalez - Nacho Mendoza (friend of James and Tania Santos and Victoria's son)
- Tony Martinez - Ricardo Molina (director of "It's news") (first season)
- Sonia Castelo - Isabel Tejero (reporter Natalia's enemy)
- Elena Ballesteros - Silvia Márquez (financial director of Acosta Laboratories) (second season)
- Miguel Ramiro - Martin Gaínza/Miguel Ballester (New Director of "It's news") (second season)
- Asier Etxeandía - David (second season)
- Arturo Arribas - Pedro Guillén (chemist of Acosta Laboratories)

=== Episodic ===
- Menh-Wai Trinh - Mara Yimou (Federico's secretary)
- Chema Muñoz - Arturo Acosta (chemist of Acosta Laboratories)
- Paca Barrera - Adriana (forensic Natalia's friend)
- Ana Labordeta - Rosa (Federico's new secretary)
- Roberto Quintana - Mario Villar (Arturo's attorney)
- Cristina Segarra - Ana Lopez
- Manuel de Blas - Gonzalo Pedraza (Berta's father and DTV's partner)
- Liz Lobato - Arcangel
- Charo Zapardiel - Judge
- Luis Zahera - Joaquín Gálvez (witness in favor of Arturo Acosta)
- Isidoro Fernandez - Prison doctor
- Alejandro Casaseca - Cardenas (murderer)
- Eleazar Ortiz - July Velázquez (ex-lover and owner of Virginia Prolab)
- Aitor Mazo - Juan Villarroel (Acosta Laboratories's enemy)
- Chus Castrillo - Aganzo\Sandra Suner (ex-member of the White Company)
- Amparo Vega - Diana Vicente (Acosta Laboratories's counsellor)
- Arthur Querejeta - Holgado (Acosta Laboratories's counsellor)
- Marian Álvarez - Esther (Tania's friend)
- Isabel Ampudia - Teresa Forner (Pardo's widow)
- Esperanza de la Vega - Angeles Martorell\Gabriela (Santos's widow and Arcangel's bride)
- Ines Morales - Gloria Nunez (Federico's ex-lover)
- Alex O'Dogherty - Antonio Cruz (DTV's ex-employee)
- Karmele Aramburu - (provincial prison director)
- Pilar Massa - Leticia (prison doctor)
- Usun Yoon - Mara Yimou
- Ion Lion - Editor
- Manolo Solo - Fiscal

=== Special recurring guests ===
- Lluís Homar - Andrew Mercader
- Txema Blasco - Guillermo del Valle
- Alicia Borrachero - Cruz Gándara
- Angels Barceló

== Episodes ==
Season	No. episodes	Season premiere	Season finale	TV season	Avg. viewers (millions)
1	13	February 1, 2005	April 26, 2005	2005-2005	4.82
2	14	September 13, 2005	December 13, 2005	2005-2005	3.98

=== Season 1 ===
No (series)	No (temp)	Title	Date of issue	Viewers
1	1	Cincuenta aniversario (Fifty anniversary)	February 1, 2005	5.034 million (26.9%)
2	2	¿Culpable o innocente? (Guilty or innocent?)	February 8, 2005	4.767 million (27.4%)
3	3	¿Suicidio o asesinato? (Suicide or murder?)	February 15, 2005	3.622 million (26.5%)
4	4	La cuenta atrás ha comenzado (The countdown has begun)	February 22, 2005	4.75 million (26.5%)
5	5	Las víctimas se multiplican (The victims multiply)	March 1, 2005	4.343 million (23.3%)
6	6	Últimas horas (Last hours)	March 8, 2005	4.411 million (24.7%)
7	7	Secretos (Secrets)	March 15, 2005	4.687 million (26.6%)
8	8	La compañía Blanca (The White Company)	March 22, 2005	4.511 million (28.0%)
9	9	Historias del pasado (Stories from the past)	March 29, 2005	4.978 million (28.5%)
10	10	Ahorcado (Hangman)	April 5, 2005	5.12 million (29.5%)
11	11	Acosadas (Harassed)	April 12, 2005	5.006 million (29.3%)
12	12	El cerco se estrecha (The circle is closing)	April 19, 2005	5.301 million (30.2%)
13	13	El nombre del asesino (The name of the murderer)	April 26, 2005	6.199 million (35.9%)

=== Season 2 ===
No temp	No episode	Title	Date of issue	Viewers
14	1	Capítulo especial (Special Chapter)	September 13, 2005	3.13 million (22.4%)
15	2	El arcángel (The Archangel)	September 20, 2005	3.734 million (24.6%)
16	3	La pesadilla de Tania (Tania 's Nightmare)	September 27, 2005	3.448 million (21.2%)
17	4	Morir o matar (Die or Kill)	October 4, 2005	4.232 million (26.1%)
18	5	Dos días con Martorell (Two days with Martorell)	October 11, 2005	3.573 million (22.8%)
19	6	Hace quince años (Fifteen years ago)	October 18, 2005	4.044 million (24.6%)
20	7	La amante de Santos (Santos' lover)	October 25, 2005	4.101 million (24.3%)
21	8	Fuera de juego (Offside)	November 1, 2005	3.661 million (23.4%)
22	9	¿El fin de Victoria Castellanos? (The End of Victoria Castellanos?)	November 8, 2005	4.039 million (23.4%)
23	10	a423	November 15, 2005	4.055 million (24.5%)
24	11	Cuarentena (Quarantine)	November 22, 2005	3.967 million (25.9%)
25	12	Arturo...	November 29, 2005	4.021 million (23.1%)
26	13	Fantasmas del pasado (Ghosts)	December 6, 2005	4.015 million (24.8%)
27	14	Hasta siempre (Farewell)	December 13, 2005	4.854 million (28.0%)

== Awards and nominations ==
List of awards and nominations
Award	Category	Recipients and nominees	Result
Eñe TV Awards 2005	Best Series of 2005	Personal Reasons (Spanish: Motivos Personales)	Won
Eñe TV Awards 2005	Next Big Thing of 2005	Personal Reasons (Spanish: Motivos Personales)	Won
Eñe TV Awards 2005	Best Director	Salvador Calvo	Won
Eñe TV Awards 2005	Best Screenplay	Diana Laffond Yges; Carlos Vila; Javier Holgado	Won
Eñe TV Awards 2005	Best Actress	Lydia Bosch	Won
Eñe TV Awards 2005	Best Supporting Actress	Marta Calvo	Won
Eñe TV Awards 2005	Best Supporting Actor	Pedro Casablanc	Won
Eñe TV Awards 2005	Best Cast	Lydia Bosch, Marta Calvo, Daniel Freire, Pedro Casablanc, Ana Gracia, Sonia Castelo; Miguel Angel Silvestre, Belén López, Elena Ballesteros; Jan Cornet, Alex Gonzalez, Begoña Maestre, Concha Velasco, Fernando Guillén, Ginés García Millán	Won
Eñe TV Awards 2005	Best Supporting Actor	Ginés García Millán	Nominated
Eñe TV Awards 2005	Best Supporting Actress	Ana Gracia	Nominated
Eñe TV Awards 2005	Best Supporting Actress	Concha Velasco	Nominated
Silver Frames 2005; Spanish: Fotogramas de Plata 2005	Best TV Actress	Lydia Bosch	Nominated
XV Academy Awards Actors Union; Spanish: Premios de la Unión de Actore	Best Supporting Actor	Pedro Casablanc	Nominated
Zapping Awards; Spanish: Premios Zapping	Best Actress	Lydia Bosch	Won
Zapping Awards; Spanish: Premios Zapping	Best Actor	Daniel Freire	Nominated
