= Life and Colour =

- Theatrical release poster
- Spanish: Vida y color
- Directed by: Santiago Tabernero
- Written by: Santiago Tabernero
- Produced by: Loris Omedes; Gaizka Urresti; Luis Ángel Ramírez
- Starring: Junio Valverde; Silvia Abascal; Miguel Ángel Silvestre; Carmen Machi; Joan Dalmau; Nadia de Santiago; Andrés Lima
- Cinematography: José Luis Alcaine
- Edited by: José Salcedo
- Music by: Matthew Herbert
- Production companies: Imval Producciones; Bausan Films; La Filmería
- Distributed by: Alta Classics
- Release dates: 24 October 2005 (Seminci); 5 January 2006 (Spain)
- Running time: 100 minutes
- Country: Spain
- Language: Spanish

Life and Colour (Spanish: Vida y color) is a 2005 Spanish film written and directed by Santiago Tabernero in his feature length directorial debut. Its cast features Junio Valverde, Silvia Abascal, Miguel Ángel Silvestre, and Joan Dalmau, among others.

== Plot ==
Spain, 1975. Fede, a fifteen-year-old boy, is getting conscious of his environment little by little: his sister Begoña, unsatisfied with her imminent wedding; his grandfather, who stops dealing with his best friend after the Spanish Civil War; his friend Ramona, a girl with Down syndrome who was raped by her father, a young man who works with his father.

== Cast ==
- Junio Valverde as Fede
- Silvia Abascal as Bego
- Miguel Ángel Silvestre as Javi
- Joan Dalmau
- Adolfo Fernández as Angel
- Ana Wagener as Sole
- Nadia de Santiago as Sara
- Natalia Abascal as Ramona
- Carmen Machi as Leo
- Andrés Lima as Marciano

== Release ==
The film was presented at the 50th Valladolid International Film Festival (Seminci) in October 2005. Distributed by Alta Classics, it was theatrically released in Spain on 5 January 2006.

== Reception ==
Jonathan Holland of Variety deemed the film to be a "powerful, haunting and finely observed debut about life in a rural Spanish village during the last months of General Franco's life".

== Accolades ==
| Year | Award | Category | Nominee(s) | Result | Ref. |
|---|---|---|---|---|---|
| 2005 | 50th Valladolid International Film Festival | Public's Choice Award | | Won | |
| 2006 | 20th Goya Awards | Best New Director | Santiago Tabernero | Nominated | |

== See also ==
- List of Spanish films of 2006
