= La boda de mi mejor amigo =

- Directed by: Celso García
- Written by: Gabriel Ripstein
- Starring: Ana Serradilla; Carlos Ferro; Miguel Ángel Silvestre; Natasha Dupeyrón
- Distributed by: Sony Pictures Releasing
- Release date: 14 February 2019 (Mexico)
- Country: Mexico
- Language: Spanish
- Budget: $5,217,163

La boda de mi mejor amigo (transl. My best friend's Wedding) is a 2019 Mexican comedy-drama film directed by Celso García that premiered on 14 February 2019. It is an adaptation of the 1997 American film My Best Friend's Wedding. The film stars Ana Serradilla, Carlos Ferro, Miguel Ángel Silvestre, and Natasha Dupeyrón.

== Cast ==
- Ana Serradilla as Julia
- Carlos Ferro as Manuel
- Miguel Ángel Silvestre as Jorge
- Natasha Dupeyrón as Pamela
- Patricia Bernal
- Paco Rueda as Cocinero
- Minnie West as Tammi
