= Dany Saadia =

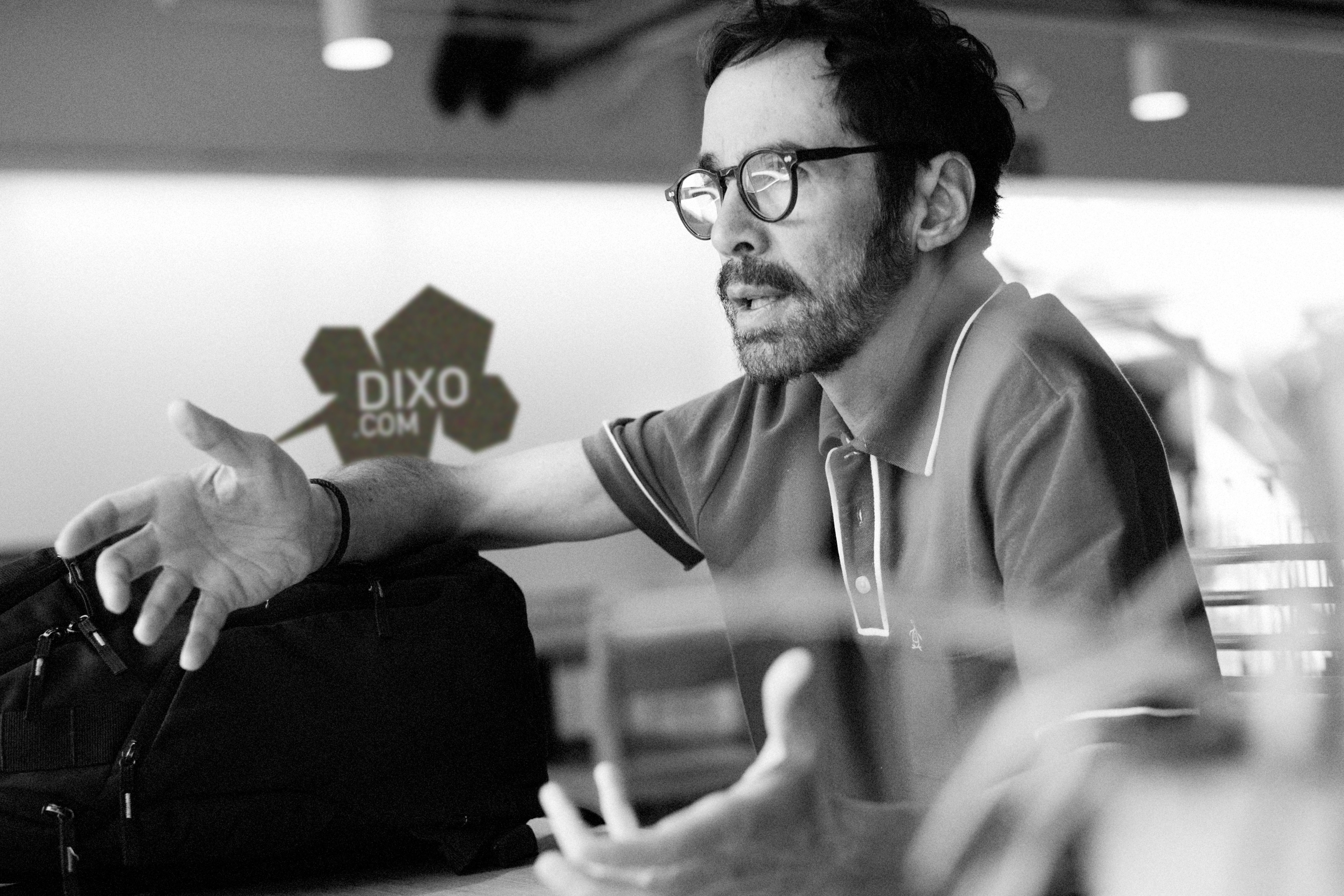
- Dany Saadia, 2019
- Born: September 19, 1973 (age 52); Mexico City, Mexico
- Occupations: Screenwriter; Film director Entrepreneur
- Known for: Films: Genesis 3:19; 3:19 Nada Es Casualidad; Businesses: 'Interfaz 401' 'Dixo' 'Substance'

Dany Saadia is a Mexican filmmaker, screenwriter, podcaster and entrepreneur who won the 2008 Best Director Malaga Festival award as well as the Best Feature Film award at the Mostra de València (Spain). As of 2026 he is the CEO of Dixo, the first podcasting production company in Mexico.

== Career ==
=== Genesis 3:19 ===
In 2003 he wrote and directed Genesis 3:19 a short film whose world premiere was at the 2004 Tribeca Film Festival. The film won 'Best Screenplay' at the 2004 Rhode Island Film Festival, and 'Best Short Film' at the 2004 Austin Film Festival.

=== 3:19 Nada Es Casualidad ===
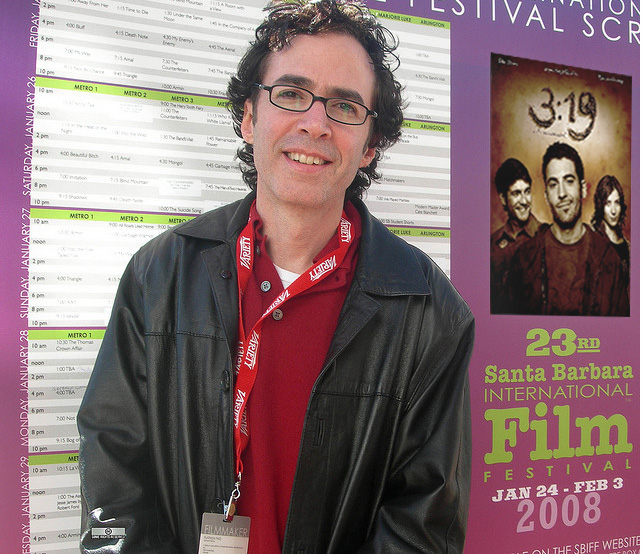
Dany Saadia at the 2008 Santa Barbara Film Festival.

In 2006 he wrote and directed his first feature film, 3:19 Nada Es Casualidad, a Spanish-Mexican production, in Valencia, Spain. It starred Miguel Angel Silvestre, Felix Gomez, Juan Diaz, Barbara Goenaga and Diana Bracho. The soundtrack was scored by Robin Guthrie, and edited by Ivan Aledo.

The world premiere of 3:19 Nada Es Casualidad was during the 2008 Santa Barbara International Film Festival. The film earned a positive review from Variety film critic Robert Koehler.

During the festival run, 3:19 Nada Es Casualidad won 'Best Director' in the 2008 Málaga Spanish Film Festival, and won for 'Best Film' and for 'Best Actor' for Miguel Angel Silvestre in the 2008 Mostra de Valencia.

=== Faust Arp ===
In 2008 he entered the Aniboom In Rainbows Contest to create a full-length animated video clip for Radiohead, and his video clip submission Faust Arp was one of the finalists of the In Rainbows Animated Music Video Contest.

=== Podcast production ===
In 2005, Saadia founded Dixo, the first network of podcasts and blogs in Mexico.

== Filmography ==
Writer / Director
| Year | Film | Other notes |
|---|---|---|
| 2004 | "Genesis 3:19" | Short film |
| 2005 | "The Perfect Date" | Short film |
| 2006 | 3:19 Nada Es Casualidad | Feature film |

== Recognition ==
In comparing 3:19 Nada Es Casualidad to Saadia's earlier work, Variety film critic Robert Koehler wrote "Saadia has built his feature on the groundwork of his 2004 short, Genesis 3:19, but the final work may be overbuilt," expanding, "Saadia's warm cast, full of youthful Spanish thesps (many direct from the Iberian tube), add a lightness of being to a film that gets a little too eager to fling ideas at the viewer." However, he granted that "Production values add considerable allure to the brainy entertainment, decked out with an interesting score by the Cocteau Twins' Robin Guthrie."

=== Awards and nominations ===
- 2004, won 'Best Screenplay' at Rhode Island Film Festival for Genesis 3:19
- 2004, won 'Best Narrative Short Film' at 'Austin Film Festival for Genesis 3:19
- 2006, shortlisted for Best Short Fiction Film Short by - Academy Awards for Genesis 3:19
- 2008, won 'Best Director' at Málaga Spanish Film Festival for 3:19 Nada Es Casualidad
- 2008, won 'Best Feature Film' at Mostra de Valencia for 3:19 Nada Es Casualidad
- 2008, won 'Best Actor' for Miguel Angel Silvestreat at Mostra de Valencia for 3:19 Nada Es Casualidad
