= Belén López (actress) =

Spanish actress

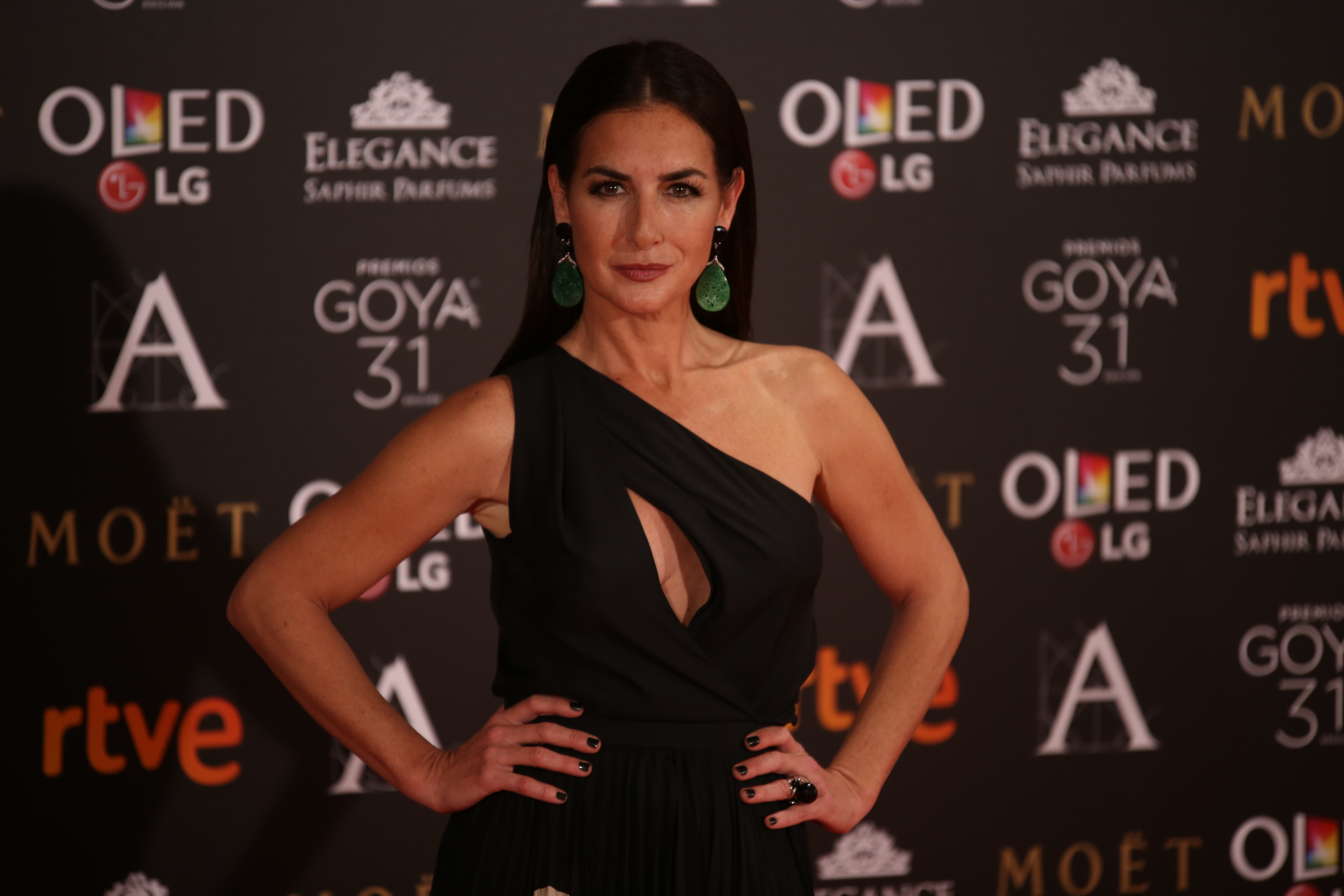
- Belén López at the 31st Goya Awards in 2017
- Born: María de Belén López; 28 March 1970 (age 56); Seville, Spain
- Occupation: Actress
- Years active: 1994–present
- Partner(s): Miguel Ángel Silvestre (2005–2010); Añil Fernández (2017–present)

María de Belén López (born 28 March 1970) better known as Belén López is a Spanish actress. She is best known for appearing in TV series such as Motivos Personales in which she played Maite Valcárcel in 2005; Pelotas (2009–10), in which she portrayed Bea, and Luna, el misterio de Calenda (2012–), in which she currently plays the role of Carola.

== Biography ==
belen López studied acting at the now defunct Centro Andaluz de Teatro [es] (CAT), along with Paco León and Paz Vega. During her first two years at the school, her parents died, but she continued to pursue her studies in music, song, dance, acrobatics and pantomime while suffering her loss.[2] During her studies, she managed to get a small role in the TV series Plaza Alta. Gaining popularity, she was given a leading role alongside José Luis Garcia Pérez in the new follow-up series Castillos en el Aire, based on Plaza Alta.[3] She had a very minor role in Pilar Távora's Yular (1998).

In 2001, López portrayed Raquel Conde in the TV series Esencia de poder. The following year, she played Bárbara in the hospital drama series, Hospital Central. In 2003, she played Lorena in Una nueva vida. Between 2000 and 2006, she sang with the actors Guillermo Rayo and Manolo Caro in the group Rayo y los Trueno, later recording with them. López had her first major role in a feature film in 2006 in La Distancia, produced by Pepe Quero and co-starring Miguel Ángel Silvestre, Federico Luppi and José Coronado. The film noir on boxing was well received and was shown at the San Sebastian Film Festival. She was subsequently nominated for Best New Actress at the Goya Awards.

She then moved to Madrid and continued working in TV and feature films. She became more popular following her role as Maite Valcárcel in the series Motivos Personales in 2005, which won her an award. She also received many awards and her role in Llévame a otro sitio was appreciated. She has since acted in numerous television serias including: RIS Cientifico (Telecinco), Pelotas (TVE), the biopic Hoy Quiero Confesar (Antena 3) and Luna, el misterio de Calenda (Antena 3). She had roles in the films Ocho Citas (2008) directed by Peris Romano and Rodrigo Sorogoyen; Holmes & Watson. Madrid Days (2012) directed by José Luis Garci; and 15 años y un dia (2013), directed by Gracia Querejeta.

== Awards ==
She won the AISGE Award for the film Take Me Somewhere Else (2004). She was nominated thrice, in 2007 for Newcomer Award for her role in The Distance (2006), in 2008 and 2001 for the award of the Spanish Actors Union for her TV series for R.I.S. Científica (2007) for supporting actress and for lead performance for the teleserial, Pelotas (2009).

== Filmography ==
=== Film ===
The films in which she has acted are:

- Recambios (2003)
- 15 días contigo (2004)
- Llévame a otro Sitio (2004)
- Ludoterapia (2006)
- Mcguffin (2005)
- La Distancia (2005)
- ¿Por qué se frotan las Patitas? (2006)
- 8 citas (2007)
- Intrusos (2007)
- Holmes & Watson. Madrid Days (2012)
- 15 años y un día (2013)

=== Television ===
She has acted in the following television series:

- Leyendas, Canal Sur (1994)
- Proyecto Seneca, Canal Sur (1995)
- Plaza Alta, Canal Sur (1998–1999)
- Castillos en el Aire, Canal Sur (1999)
- Manos a la obra, Antena 3 (2001)
- Esencia de Poder, Telecinco (2001)
- Periodistas, Telecinco (2001)
- TV-Movie Despacito y a Compás, Telecinco (2002)
- Mujeres, TVE 2 (2002)
- Hospital Central, Telecinco (2002)
- 3, 2, 1... ¡Vídeo!, Canal Sur (2002)
- Segundo Matrimonio, Telecinco (2002)
- Una Nueva Vida, Telecinco (2003)
- Ana y los 7, TVE (2004)
- Los Serrano, Telecinco (2004)
- El Camino de Víctor, Canal Sur (2004)
- La Sopa Boba, Antena 3 (2004)
- Motivos Personales, Telecinco (2004–2005)
- Masala, Telecinco (2006)
- El Comisario, Telecinco (2006)
- Los simuladores, Cuatro (2006)
- RIS Científica, Telecinco (2007)
- Pelotas, TVE 1 (2009–2010)
- Los misterios de Laura (2011)
- Hoy quiero confesar, Antena 3 (2011)
- Luna, el misterio de Calenda, Antena 3 (2012–2013)
- Mar de plástico, Antena 3 (2015)
- Traición, La 1 (2017–2018)
- White Lines (2020)
- Caronte (2020)
- Berlin (2023)
