= Weiss & Morales =

- Genre: Police procedural
- Directed by: Oriol Ferrer; Lucía Estévez
- Starring: Miguel Ángel Silvestre; Katia Fellin
- Countries of origin: Spain; Germany
- Original languages: Spanish; German
- No. of seasons: 1
- No. of episodes: 4

Production
- Production companies: RTVE; ZDF; Portocabo; Nadcon; ZDF Studios

Original release
- Network: La 1
- Release: 23 May – 13 June 2025
- Network: ZDF
- Release: 19 October – 9 November 2025

Weiss & Morales is a Spanish-German police procedural television miniseries directed by Oriol Ferrer and Lucía Estévez for Radiotelevisión Española (RTVE) and Zweites Deutsches Fernsehen (ZDF), in collaboration with Portocabo, Nadcon, and ZDF Studios. It stars Miguel Ángel Silvestre and Katia Fellin.

== Premise ==
Sergeant Raúl Morales of the Spanish Civil Guard and Inspector Nina Weiss of the German Federal Criminal Police Office are forced to collaborate in the wake of a murder case involving the German community residing in the Canary Islands.

== Cast ==
- Miguel Ángel Silvestre as Raúl Morales
- Katia Fellin as Nina Weiss
- Margarita Broich as Margarethe
- Juanjo Puigcorbé
- Thomas Heinze as Markus
- Mariam Hernández as Sara
- Yaiza Guimaré
- Valerie Huber
- Frank Feys
- Iria Santana as Vivi
- Tania Santana as Paula

== Production ==
Weiss & Morales is a Radiotelevisión Española (RTVE) and Zweites Deutsches Fernsehen (ZDF) co-production in collaboration with Portocabo, Nadcon, and ZDF Studios. Each of the four 90-minute episodes solves a different murder case. Filming took over three months in Gran Canaria and La Gomera between March and July 2024. The series was presented in June 2024 at Conecta Fiction in Toledo. It made it to the television series programme of the 28th Málaga Film Festival's official selection.
