= Yany Prado =

Cuban actress

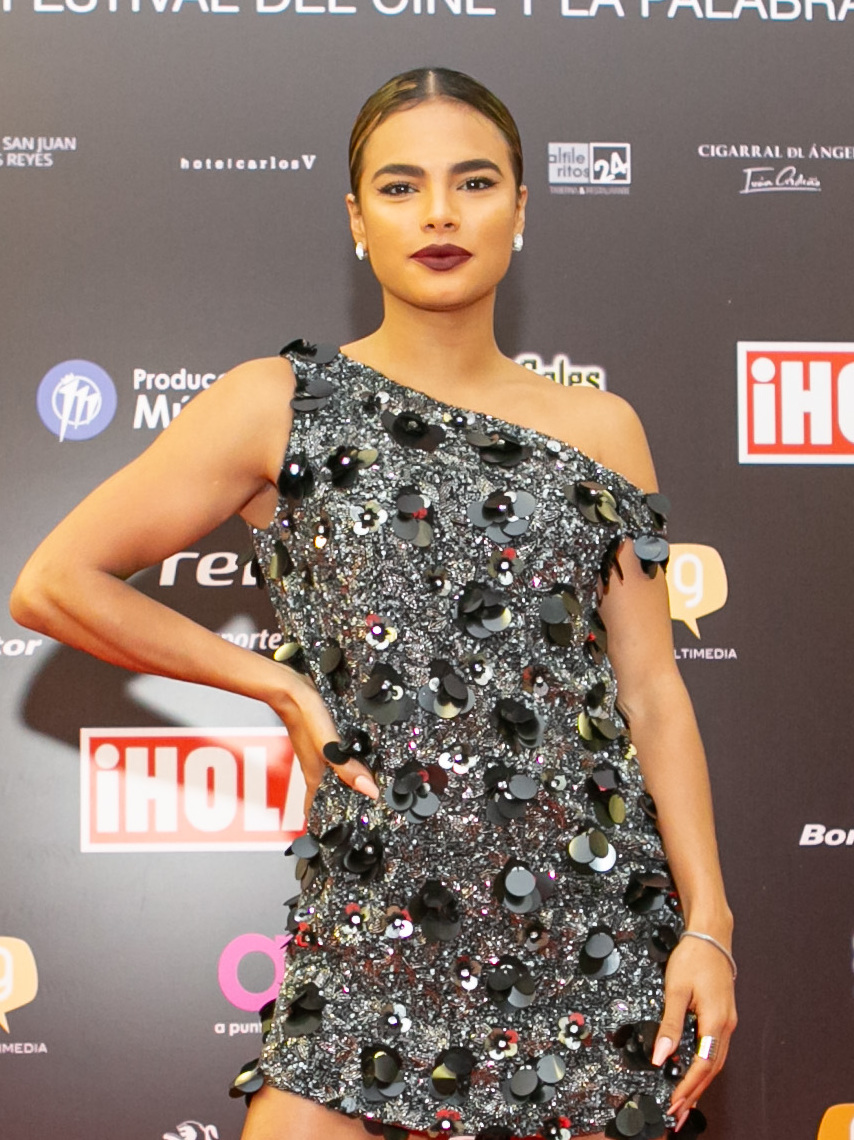
- Prado at the 13th CiBRA Festival in 2021
- Born: Yany Prado Torres; 2 January 1991 (age 34); Havana, Cuba
- Occupation: Actress
- Years active: 2010–present

Yany Prado Torres (born 2 January 1991) is a Cuban actress. She is best known for playing Génesis in La doble vida de Estela Carrillo and Irma in La reina soy yo. In 2021, Prado starred on the Netflix's series Sky Rojo as Gina.

== Life and career ==
Prado was born in Havana on 2 January 1991, but moved to Mexico at age eleven together with her family. She went to Televisa's Centro de Educación Artística where she studied acting. Her first television role was in 2010 in the Mexican series La rosa de Guadalupe as Carolina and other characters in the following years. Prado made her television comeback in 2017 in La doble vida de Estela Carrillo playing Génesis. The role gave her a nomination for Best Young Lead Actress at the 36th TVyNovelas Awards.

In 2018, she played La Negra in the Mexican TV series Tres Milagros, and, in 2019, she played La Luchis in Ringo and Irma in La reina soy yo.

In 2019, she was cast to play the role of Gina in the Netflix Spanish series Sky Rojo.

== Filmography ==
Television roles
Year	Title	Role	Notes
2010–2014	La rosa de Guadalupe	Various	4 episodes
2015	Como dice el dicho	Pamela	1 episode
2017	La doble vida de Estela Carrillo	Génesis	Main role
2018	Tres Milagros	Luz María "La Negra"	Main role
2019	Ringo	La Luchis	Recurring role
2019	La reina soy yo	Irma "El Huracán"	Main role
2021–2023	Sky Rojo	Gina	Lead role
2024	Zorro	Dr. Kohl	
2024	El Conde: Amor y honor	Violeta	
2024	Y llegaron de noche	Amelia	
2025	La Jefa	Yadira Castro	
2025	Top Chef VIP	Contestant	19 episodes

== Awards and nominations ==
=== Premios TVyNovelas ===
Year	Category	Nominated work	Result	Ref.
2018	Best Young Lead Actress	La doble vida de Estela Carrillo	Nominated	
