= White Lines (TV series) =

Netflix mystery thriller series

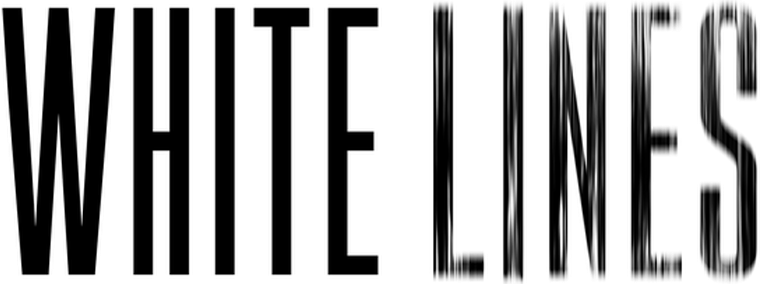
- Genre: Mystery; Thriller; Drama
- Created by: Álex Pina
- Written by: Álex Pina; Esther Martínez Lobato; Javier Gómez Santander; David Barrocal; Alberto Úcar; Nacho Sánchez Quevedo; Ed Wethered
- Directed by: Nick Hamm; Luis Prieto; Ashley Way
- Starring: Laura Haddock; Nuno Lopes; Marta Milans; Daniel Mays; Laurence Fox; Angela Griffin; Juan Diego Botto; Pedro Casablanc; Belén López; Francis Magee; Tom Rhys Harries
- Composer: Junkie XL
- Countries of origin: Spain; United Kingdom
- Original languages: English; Spanish
- No. of seasons: 1
- No. of episodes: 10

Production
- Executive producers: Álex Pina; Sharon Hughff; Andy Harries
- Producers: Chris Croucher; Mark Kinsella; Michael Eagle-Hodgson
- Cinematography: Juan Miguel Azpiroz; Kieran McGuigan; Martin Fuhrer; Álvaro Gutiérrez
- Editors: Yan Miles; Kim Gaster; Elen Pierce Lewis; Adam Green; Daniel Greenway
- Camera setup: Single-camera
- Running time: 50–63 minutes
- Production companies: Left Bank Pictures; Vancouver Media; Sony Pictures Television

Original release
- Network: Netflix
- Release: 15 May 2020

White Lines is a mystery thriller television series created by Álex Pina. The 10-episode first series was released on Netflix on 15 May 2020. In August 2020, the series was cancelled after one season.

== Premise ==
When Zoe Walker's brother Axel is found dead, 20 years after going missing while he was working as a DJ in Ibiza, she decides to travel there and investigate.

== Cast and characters ==
=== Main ===
- Laura Haddock as Zoe Walker
  - India Fowler as young Zoe
- Nuno Lopes as Duarte "Boxer" Silva
  - Rafael Morais as Young Boxer
- Marta Milans as Kika Calafat
  - Zoe Mulheims as Young Kika
- Daniel Mays as Marcus Ward
  - Cel Spellman as young Marcus
- Laurence Fox as David
  - Jonny Green as young David
- Angela Griffin as Anna Connor
  - Kassius Nelson as young Anna
- Juan Diego Botto as Oriol Calafat
- Pedro Casablanc as Andreu Calafat
- Belén López as Conchita Calafat
- Francis Magee as Clint Collins
- Tom Rhys Harries as Axel Collins

=== Recurring ===
- Jade Alleyne as Tanny Ward
- Ava Naylor as Matilda Ward
- Barry Ward as Mike Walker
- Fernando Albizu as Pepe Martínez
- Agus Ruiz as Cristobal
- Javi Coll as Juan Miguel Fonseca
- Paulo Pires as George
- Tallulah Evans as Jenny Walker
- Geena Román as Sissy
- Mariano Garmendia as Bruno
- Maggie O'Neill as Yoana
- Þorvaldur Davíð as Narco

== Episodes ==
No.	Title	Directed by	Written by	Original release date
1	"Episode 1"	Nick Hamm	Álex Pina, Esther Martínez Lobato, Javier Gómez Santander, David Barrocal, Alberto Úcar and Ed Wethered	15 May 2020
Heavy rainfall on the Almería desert unearths the body of Axel Collins, a Manchester-born DJ who went missing on Ibiza twenty years ago. His sister Zoe Walker is frustrated to learn Axel's murder will not be investigated due to Spanish prosecution laws, so she journeys to Ibiza herself in search of answers. Andreu Calafat, a powerful businessman on the island, is troubled to learn Axel's body has been discovered on his land; he tasks Boxer, his chief of security, with finding out whether his wife Conchita or son Oriol were involved in Axel's murder. Zoe and Boxer's investigations collide when they visit Marcus, Axel's former best friend.
2	"Episode 2"	Nick Hamm	Álex Pina, Esther Martínez Lobato, David Barrocal, Alberto Úcar and Ed Wethered	15 May 2020
Axel's former girlfriend Kika Calafat returns to Ibiza amidst a family civil war and quickly befriends Zoe, who has reluctantly joined forces with Boxer to learn more about her brother's death. Zoe interrogates Axel's old friends from Manchester – Marcus, his ex-wife Anna and spiritualist David – and takes drastic action to break their silence. Her actions leave Marcus in terrible danger from Romanian drug traffickers.
3	"Episode 3"	Luis Prieto	Álex Pina, Esther Martínez Lobato, David Barrocal, Alberto Úcar and Ed Wethered	15 May 2020
Zoe and Boxer are caught in a high-speed chase with the police as they try to dispose of Marcus' cocaine stash. After being brutally attacked, Marcus begs Zoe to protect his children, whilst Boxer moves against the Romanians. Andreu alienates Oriol and Conchita when he asks Kika to take over as CEO of the company. Determined to clear his name, Oriol viciously interrogates Cristóbal Martínez, but his actions could reignite a war between Ibiza's most powerful families.
4	"Episode 4"	Luis Prieto	Álex Pina, Esther Martínez Lobato, David Barrocal, Alberto Úcar and Ed Wethered	15 May 2020
Conchita's attempt to ease rising tensions between the Calafat and Martínez families fails, with horrific consequences for Andreu. Zoe's father Clint arrives on Ibiza and urges her to return to Manchester. His interference pushes her closer to Boxer, who confesses that he has murdered the Romanian traffickers to protect both her and Marcus.
5	"Episode 5"	Luis Prieto	Álex Pina, Esther Martínez Lobato and Ed Wethered	15 May 2020
Zoe wrestles with her conscience after sleeping with Boxer, and is left infuriated when her father cuts off her therapy sessions. The Calafats unite in the face of Andreu's life-changing injuries, all too aware that his accident was orchestrated by Pepe Martínez. Anna and Marcus rekindle their flame as he recuperates from his broken leg.
6	"Episode 6"	Ashley Way	Álex Pina, David Barrocal, Alberto Úcar and Ed Wethered	15 May 2020
Marcus faces financial ruin and ropes Zoe into a dangerous plan to retrieve packages of cocaine, but their actions inadvertently uncover the bodies of the Romanian traffickers during a public celebration. Zoe faces uncomfortable truths when David shows her photos of the night Axel was murdered. Tensions brew between Kika and Oriol as the Calafats deliberate the future of their family businesses.
7	"Episode 7"	Ashley Way	Álex Pina, Esther Martínez Lobato and Ed Wethered	15 May 2020
Axel's friends and family gather to remember him over a reunion dinner, but things soon turn sour. Zoe is furious when Boxer reveals their fling to the other guests, while Marcus is pushed to the brink after clashing with Anna's fiancé George. Clint continues to keep tabs on Zoe from afar.
8	"Episode 8"	Ashley Way	Álex Pina, David Barrocal, Alberto Úcar, Nacho Sánchez Quevedo and Ed Wethered	15 May 2020
Zoe's husband and daughter arrive in Ibiza, leaving her debating whether to confess her affair with Boxer. Anna's reckless behaviour puts Zoe's daughter in danger. David hosts a mediation session between the Calafats, and Kika forces Oriol to confront his sexual attraction to their mother. Clint follows a lead to Cristóbal Martínez, who reveals a vital clue that places Oriol under suspicion.
9	"Episode 9"	Nick Hamm	Álex Pina, Esther Martínez Lobato, David Barrocal and Ed Wethered	15 May 2020
Clint kidnaps Oriol and plans to take him back to England to face justice for Axel's murder. Zoe and Boxer join forces to stop him leaving Ibiza, but events soon take a tragic turn. Anna is forced to examine her past and her future after discovering that Marcus and Kika are together. In flashbacks, the relationship between Axel, Marcus and Anna takes a surprising turn.
10	"Episode 10"	Nick Hamm	Álex Pina, Esther Martínez Lobato, David Barrocal, Alberto Úcar, Nacho Sánchez Quevedo and Ed Wethered	15 May 2020
Grieving and hell-bent on revenge, Zoe makes a shocking move. Her actions derail Anna's wedding day and trigger a chain of events that finally exposes the truth about Axel's murder. Old mistakes come back to haunt Marcus just as he gets comfortable with the Calafats.

== Production ==
It was announced in October 2016 that Netflix had ordered a series created by Money Heist creator Álex Pina. In June 2019, Laura Haddock, Marta Milans, Juan Diego Botto, Nuno Lopes, Daniel Mays, Laurence Fox and Angela Griffin joined the cast of the show.

=== Filming ===
Filming commenced in June 2019 in the Balearic Islands and ended in October 2019.

== Release ==
White Lines was released on Netflix on 15 May 2020.

== Reception ==
The review aggregator website Rotten Tomatoes reported a 63% approval rating for the first series with an average rating of 6.57/10, based on 16 reviews. The website's critical consensus reads, "A tasty, self-indulgent tangle of mystery, White Lines is a sight to behold -- even if there's not much below the surface." On Metacritic, it has a weighted average score of 50 out of 100, based on 7 critics, indicating "mixed or average reviews".
