= Aichaku =

2025 film by Raito Nishizaka and Michael Williams

- Release poster
- Directed by: Raito Nishizaka; Michael Williams
- Screenplay by: Christopher McCombs
- Produced by: Christopher McCombs; Haku Inko
- Starring: Christopher McCombs; Christopher Nishizawa; Emika Kamieda; Koichi Sakaguchi; Cynthia Cheston; Naoya Gomoto; Kaori Takeshita; Yayoi Fujiwara
- Edited by: Michael Williams
- Music by: Takahiro Nomiya
- Production company: Tokyo Cowboys
- Distributed by: Amazon Prime Video
- Release date: April 22, 2025
- Running time: 118 minutes
- Country: Japan
- Languages: Japanese; English

Aichaku (Japanese: 愛着; lit.. "Affection") is a 2025 Japanese film directed by Raito Nishizaka and Michael Williams that premiered on Amazon Prime Video in April 2025. The film stars Christopher McCombs and Christopher Nishizawa as two men living in a remote area of Chiba, Japan who fall in love over the course of the three-day story.

Aichaku is additionally available in fourteen languages via Taiwan-based worldwide subscription video on demand service GagaOOLala.

== Plot ==
Lucas, an American expat, works as an English teacher at a struggling small language school in a rural town of Chiba Prefecture, Japan. He lives modestly and dreams of buying an abandoned roadside café that he often passes, but with his meager salary, it's out of reach.

Meanwhile, Ken, a half‑Japanese man raised by his uncle after his father's suicide and his mother's return to the United States, has worked since age fifteen at his uncle Nobu's construction business. Ken quietly yearns to learn English so someday he can reconnect with his mother in America.

Over the span of three days, the two meet and their lives subtly intertwine. Initially reserved and uncertain, Ken gradually warms to Lucas, and an unlikely friendship forms. They share intimate conversations that reveal their vulnerabilities and past hurts, and eventually become physically intimate. For Lucas, the connection feels transformative. Ken, on the other hand, grapples with uncertainty about his own sexuality and emotional readiness.

When Lucas unexpectedly loses his teaching job, he faces possible expulsion from Japan due to visa restrictions. To stay longer, he reluctantly agrees to a marriage of convenience with his landlady's daughter Marie—who, unbeknownst to him at first, is lesbian. This ruse allows him to maintain his residency temporarily while navigating complex emotional terrain.

Meanwhile, Ken slowly overcomes his fears and gains clarity about who he is and what he wants. Learning to accept himself enables him to take definitive action. At the climax, Ken and Lucas confess their love for one another. Empowered by their attachment—to each other and to their shared dreams—they purchase the café Lucas had long coveted. The film concludes a year later at a festive grand opening of that café, with family and friends gathered, signaling new beginnings and emotional fulfillment for both men.

== Cast ==
- Christopher McCombs as Lucas
- Christopher Nishizawa as Ken
- Emika Kamieda as Erika
- Koichi Sakaguchi as Nobu
- Cynthia Cheston as Cathy
- Naoya Gomoto as Ryosuke
- Kaori Takeshita as Yoshiko
- Yayoi Fujiwara as Marie

== Production ==
=== Development ===
Production company Tokyo Cowboys was heading into its tenth year and wanted to make something special to commemorate the anniversary. After making several streaming shows, the production company decided to return to the movie format that they had begun with.

Raito Nishizaka and Michael Williams had previously worked together on several of production company Tokyo Cowboy's projects including comedy series The Benza, Benza English, and the travel documentary show Getting Dirty in Japan. It was decided with Lucas being a foreigner and Ken being Japanese that it was important for Aichaku to have two directors with each director aligning with one of the character's perspectives.

Screenplay writer Christopher McCombs partially based the story of Aichaku off of his personal experiences living in Japan for fifteen years and partially on a series of interviews held in Chiba, Japan in 2023. Though initially Aichaku began as a short film script, McCombs realized that they weren't going to be able to tell the kind of story that he wanted to in that format. McCombs wrote the part of Ken specifically for Nishizawa after a four-hour meeting in 2022 where they discussed different project ideas they could potentially work on together.

=== Casting ===
Casting began with video auditions followed by an in-person callback. Callbacks were held for Aichaku in 2023 with Emika Kamieda and Yayoi Fujiwara in attendance. Kamieda and Fujiwara were both cast partially because they had experienced what it was like living overseas and could relate to Lucas' character. Kaori Takeshita was also in attendance, and was cast in part for her resemblance to Fujiwara.

Several actors who had appeared in previous Tokyo Cowboys projects returned for Aichaku, including Haku Inko, Masahito Kawahata, and Kosuke Imai in smaller roles. Cynthia Cheston, who had previously portrayed McCombs's mother in earlier works, was directly offered the role of Lucas's mother, Cathy. She accepted the part without reading the script, citing her positive experiences working with McCombs.

=== Filming ===
Rehearsals for Aichaku began in April 2023.

Filming for Aichaku took place during the summer months of 2023 and was shot entirely on location in Chiba, Japan and Ibaraki, Japan. Several of the shooting locations were found while shooting the travel documentary series Getting Dirty in Japan the year before. Both Chiba Prefecture Film Commission and Ibaraki Prefecture Film Commission officially supported production and provided shooting location support.

=== Postproduction ===
A crowd funding campaign was hosted by Executive Producer Max Emerson in part to help raise funds to support Aichaku's postproduction via Kickstarter with a campaign goal of $30,000. After the campaign goal was successfully reached, a portion of the funds were allocated to assist the completion of the film.

A test screening was held at Nakano Zero in Nakano-Ku of Tokyo, Japan on May 4, 2024, that was attended by the main cast as well as both directors.

Postproduction was completed on Aichaku in October 2024.

== Release ==
Aichaku was released in April 2025 on Amazon Prime Video in Japan and Spain. It was released on Amazon Prime Video France in May of the same year followed by Belgium, Italy, Mexico, Canada, Great Britain, Germany, and USA. Following its release in Japan, Aichaku reached number nine on Prime Video's best seller chart.

On September 22, 2025, Aichaku was released worldwide via streaming platform GagaOOLala with subtitles in fourteen languages including Vietnamese, Thai, Korean, and Hindi.

Aichaku was released on June 9, 2026 on Fox Corporation's streaming service Tubi.

== Reception ==
Aichaku received generally positive reviews from critics while some reviewers criticized its pacing and romantic development.

Several reviewers commented on the film's depiction of expatriate life and cultural identity. BL Watcher and BL Bliss noted challenges faced by the main characters, Lucas and Ken, while living in different cultures. French site L'Éternelle Romantique highlighted the film's exploration of identity and chosen family. BL News (Chil-Chil) wrote that the film extends beyond romance to explore friendship, family love, and belonging in addition to its discussion of LGBTQ issues in Japan.

The performances of Christopher McCombs and Christopher Nishizawa were praised by a number of reviewers. BL Xpress, G-Lad XX, and Taxi Drivers noted the chemistry between the two leads. Reviews also commented positively on supporting characters including Marie, Yoshiko, Cathy, and Nobu.

Reviews frequently discussed the film's rural Japanese setting. Abendzeitung Nürnberg praised the intimate and quiet moments between the protagonists. G-Lad XX and Taxi Drivers noted the use of the countryside setting and its contribution to the atmosphere of the film. The Brazilian site Cinematografia Queer praised the film's cinematography for its naturalistic use of rural landscapes.

The soundtrack received positive comments from several reviewers. Critics described the music as understated and noted its use in scenes involving loneliness and interpersonal relationships. Silverscreen Pallet highlighted the film's quiet tone and understated storytelling.

Several critics commented on the film's pacing and narrative structure. BL Watcher and BL Bliss observed that the romantic arc between Lucas and Ken develops too quickly. L'Éternelle Romantique suggested that the relationship could have benefited from additional tension or conflict. Cinematogrfia Queer wrote that parts of the story remain limited to romantic-comedy tropes and conventions. G-Lad XX note3d that some character interactions and language choices may not appeal to all viewers. Gay Films Review praised the film's premise and sincerity but described the pacing as uneven and was critical of some performances.

In addition to critical reviews, Aichaku has been featured in curated viewing round-ups by international outlets. The Spanish magazine Shangay recommended the film as a noteworthy LGTBIQ+ title on Prime Video. The Argentine magazine GENTE Online listed the film among “five dramatic films with happy endings” to stream. In Japan, BL News included Aichaku in a list of seven international LGBT films recommended for holiday viewing. The entertainment website Epicstream included Aichaku in its Valentine’s Day list of recommended romantic films for 2026. The film was also included as an honorable mention in the American magazine RAGE Monthly's list of notable films of 2025.

Nanahoshi Marriage published a column about the film and described it as a "quiet shock". The article discussed the film's portrayal of attachment styles, emotional connection, and intimacy, and recommended it to readers interested in contemporary relationships in Japan.

== Themes ==
Several reviewers and members of the production team have discussed themes of belonging and identity in Aichaku. The film's title derives from the Japanese word "aichaku", meaning attachment, and has been cited by writer Christopher McCombs as a reference to emotional connections between people, places, and personal identity.

Commentators have noted that both Lucas and Ken experience forms of displacement. Lucas is an American living in rural Japan, while Ken seeks to strengthen his connection to his American heritage through language study. Their experiences have been described as reflecting questions of belonging and cultural identity.

The film also addresses issues related to sexuality and mixed-race identity. Actress Yayoi Fujiwara stated that she viewed the portrayal of characters with different sexual orientations as an important aspect of the film and spoke about the importance of representing them with empathy.

McCombs has stated that conversations with LGBTQ individuals living in rural Japan influenced the screenplay.[42][43] Several supporting characters, including family members and members of the local community, contribute to the film's exploration of loneliness, connection, and interpersonal relationships.

== Soundtrack ==
The Aichaku soundtrack features fourteen original songs performed in a 1950s style. According to McCombs, the decision emerged during location scouting, as the retro sound complemented both the aging architecture and the weathered aesthetic of the film's settings He also explained that the familiarity of 1950s-style music could help viewers who might not immediately connect with the film's themes feel more welcome and at ease while watching.

The soundtrack was released in part on May 20, 2025, with a six track album entitled "Holding on to You (Songs from the Film Aichaku) by Ananda Jacobs as well as a two track EP release from Fossilize entitled "A Feeling I Get (Songs from the Film Aichaku)." On May 21, 2025, Klassix Jones released both "Dream Lover" and "Tricky Lil Thang" as singles.

"A Feeling I Get" charted in at number four on the Japanese iTunes soundtrack chart upon its release and additionally charted in Norway, Sweden, and Italy. "Holding on to You (Songs from the Film Aichaku)" peaked at number six as an album on the Japanese iTunes soundtrack chart as well as reaching number seven in Italy.

An official lyric video was released via YouTube on May 16, 2025, from Fossilize for "A Feeling I Get" that features footage from the film Aichaku.

Track no.	Title	Writer and music composer	Performed by
01.	"Where to Begin"	Josh Quat	Josh Quat
02.	"The Last Days"	Ananda Jacobs	Peter Lawrence Jacobs, Ananda Jacobs
03.	"A Feeling I Get"	Takahiro Nomiya, Christopher McCombs	Fossilize
04.	"Mary Lou"	First Day Lions	First Day Lions
05.	"Dream Lover"	Klassix Jones	DJ L Spade, Klassix Jones
06.	"Say the Word"	Andrew Kavanagh	Andrew Kavanagh
07.	"Ano Koro No Koto"	Takahiro Nomiya	Fossilize
08.	"Vibrations With You"	Ananda Jacobs	Peter Lawrence Jacobs
09.	"Fantastic Coffee"	Akiko Nakamura	Akiko Nakamura
10.	"Bonsai"	Marin Ishida, Carl-Isaak Krulewitch	Marin Ishida
11.	"Starry Sky""	Ananda Jacobs, Takeya Yoshimura	Takeya Yoshimura
12.	"Tricky Lil Thang"	Klassix Jones	DJ L Spade, Klassix Jones
13.	"Holding On to You"	Ananda Jacobs	Ananda Jacobs
14.	"Message to You"	Ananda Jacobs, Takeya Yoshimura	Ananda Jacobs
15.	"Till the End of Time"	Ananda Jacobs	Ananda Jacobs

== Potential sequel ==
Though both writer McCombs and director Nishizaka have indicated that a sequel to Aichaku would be difficult, they have both mentioned in separate interviews that the story of Aichaku 2 would follow Marie to America and would explore her life living in a small town. Ken and Lucas would appear as a more established couple and the relationship between Ken and his mother would be further explored testing the couple.

Actress Yayoi Fujiwara (Marie) has expressed personal interest in the sequel stating in an interview, "I’d love to see Marie discover more of herself in Aichaku 2— including her romantic desires, her self-expression, and her outlook on life in general."
