= Vancouver Media =

Spanish television production company

- Trade name: Vancouver Media S.L.
- Company type: Private limited company
- Industry: Mass media
- Founded: Madrid, Spain (2016)
- Founder: Álex Pina
- Headquarters: Calle Quintana 2, 14º Puerta 5 – 28008, Madrid, Spain
- Area served: Nationwide
- Key people: Álex Pina
- Services: Television, video
- Website: vancouvermedia.es

Vancouver Media Sociedad Limitada is a Spanish media group focused on the television industry. It was founded in 2016 by Álex Pina who is the creator of the Spanish television series Money Heist. They signed an exclusive production deal with Netflix in 2018.

== History ==
The first production was La Casa de Papel (Money Heist), which premiered on Antena 3 on May 2, 2017 with more than four million viewers.

== Main productions ==
- Money Heist
- The Pier
- White Lines
- Sky Rojo
- Billionaires' Bunker

== Awards and nominations ==
In 2018 was nominated at the Camille Awards as best Production Company.
