= Álex Pina =

Spanish television producer, screenwriter, and director

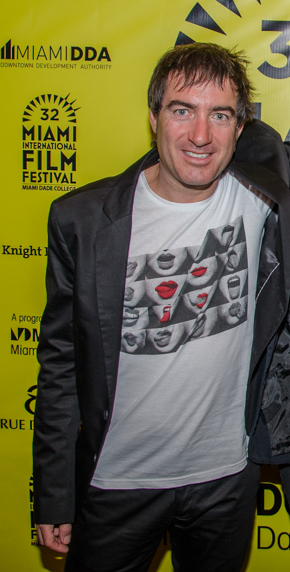
- Pina at the Miami International Film Festival in 2015
- Born: Alejandro Pina Calafi; 23 June 1967 (age 59); Pamplona, Spain
- Education: University of Navarra
- Occupations: Producer; screenwriter; director
- Years active: 1996–present

Alejandro "Álex" Pina Calafi (born 22 June 1967) is a Spanish screenwriter, television producer, and former journalist, known for creating the Spanish heist drama series La Casa De Papel (Money Heist) (2017–2021) and the prison drama series Vis a Vis (Locked Up) (2015–2020). His other shows include Los hombres de Paco (2005–2010; 2021), El embarcadero (2019–2020), White Lines (2020), Sky Rojo (2021–2023), and Billionaires' Bunker (2025). The Hollywood Reporter listed Pina in their "Top International Showrunners of 2019".

== Biography ==
Born in Pamplona in 1967, Pina began his career as a journalist, working with publications such as El Diario Vasco and Diario de Mallorca and later in the Europa Press Agency.

Between 1993 and 1996, he worked as a scriptwriter and editor for Videomedia until joining the production company Globomedia in 1996. In 1997, he started his career as a screenwriter in the television series Más que amigos and Periodistas. He later created, executive produced, and wrote for Spanish series such as Los Serrano (2003–2008), Los hombres de Paco (2005–2010; 2021), El barco (2011–2013), and Vis a Vis (Locked Up) (2015–2020). While at Globomedia, Pina founded Cangrejo Films with other creatives and producers and produced several films, including Fuga de cerebros (2009), Tres Metros Sobre el Cielo (2010), and Tengo ganas de ti (2012). He also directed and co-wrote the film Kamikaze (2014).

At the end of 2016, after the conclusion of Vis a Vis's second season, Pina left Globomedia and founded his own production company, Vancouver Media. Its first production was La Casa de Papel (Money Heist), which premiered on Antena 3 on 2 May 2017 with more than four million viewers. The series was distributed worldwide by Netflix and became the biggest success of Pina's career, leading to the signing of an exclusive contract with the streaming platform for the creation and production of an original series. In 2020, he created and co-produced White Lines. He also co-created and produced with Esther Martínez Lobato the television series Sky Rojo (2021–2013) and Berlin (2023–present), a prequel spin-off of Money Heist.

== Filmography ==
Year	Title	Director	Writer	Producer	Notes
2009	Fuga de cerebros	No	Yes	Executive	
2010	A Tres Metros Sobre el Cielo	No	No	Yes	Also song writer: "A Ras del Cielo"
2011	Fuga de cerebros 2	No	Yes	Yes	
2012	Tengo ganas de ti	No	No	Yes	
2014	Kamikaze	Yes	Yes	Yes	Also song writer: "La Rusia" and "Karadijstan libre"

=== Television ===
Year	Title	Creator	Writer	Executive Producer	Director	Notes
1997-1998	Más que amigos	No	Yes	No	No	Wrote 10 episodes
1998-2002	Periodistas	No	Yes	Yes	No	Wrote 55 episodes
2003-2008	Los Serrano	Yes	Yes	Yes	Uncredited	146 episodes; Co-created with Daniel Écija Wrote 6 episodes and directed unknown episodes
2005-2010	Los Hombres de Paco	Yes	Yes	Yes	Yes	118 episodes; Co-created with Daniel Écija Wrote 12 episodes and co-directed one
2011-2013	El Barco	Yes	Yes	Yes	No	41 episodes; Co-created with Ivan Escobar
2014	Bienvenidos al Lolita	Yes	Yes	Yes	No	TV-Miniseries; Co-created with Fernando González Molina and Esther Martínez
2015-2016	Vis a Vis	Yes	Yes	Yes	No	Co-created with Iván Escobar and Esther Martínez Lobato
2017-2021	La Casa de Papel	Yes	Yes	Yes	No	41 episodes; Wrote 33 episodes
2019-2020	El Embarcadero	Yes	Yes	Yes	No	16 episodes; Co-created with Esther Martínez Lobato
2020	White Lines	Yes	Yes	Yes	No	10 episodes
2021	Los Hombres de Paco: El Regreso	Yes	No	No	No	15 episodes
2021-2023	Sky Rojo	Yes	Yes	Yes	No	24 episodes
2023	Berlin	Yes	Yes	Yes	No	Co-created with Esther Martínez Lobato; 8 episodes
