= Billionaires' Bunker =

Spanish thriller drama television series

- Promotional poster
- Spanish: El refugio atómico
- Created by: Álex Pina; Esther Martíne Lobato
- Directed by: JeColmenar; David Barrocal; José Manuel Cravioto
- Starring: Miren Ibarguren; Joaquín Furriel; Natalia Verbeke; Carlos Santos; Montse Guallar; Pau Simón; Alícia Falcó; Agustina Bisio; Álex Villazán
- Country of origin: Spain
- Original language: Spanish
- No. of seasons: 1
- No. of episodes: 8

Production
- Production company: Vancouver Media

Original release
- Network: Netflix
- Release: 19 September 2025

Billionaires' Bunker (Spanish: El refugio atómico) is a 2025 Spanish thriller television series created by Álex Pina and Esther Martínez Lobato.

== Synopsis ==
In the face of the threat posed by an imminent nuclear war, a group of billionaires hide in a bunker called the Kimera Underground Park. Resentment between two families is fueled in the claustrophobic environment.

== Cast ==
- Pau Simón as Max Varela
- Alícia Falcó as Asia
- Miren Ibarguren as Minerva
- Agustina Bisio
- Joaquín Furriel
- Natalia Verbeke
- Carlos Santos
- Montse Guallar
- Álex Villazán

== Production ==
The series was co-created by Álex Pina and Esther Martínez Lobato. Consisting of eight episodes, it is a Vancouver Media production for Netflix.

== Release ==
The series was released on Netflix on 19 September 2025. It was canceled by Netflix after its first season.

== See also ==
- 2025 in Spanish television
