= My Best Friend's Wedding =

1997 film by P. J. Hogan

- Theatrical release poster
- Directed by: P. J. Hogan
- Screenplay by: Ronald Bass
- Produced by: Jerry Zucker; Ronald Bass; Gil Netter; Patricia Whitcher
- Starring: Julia Roberts; Dermot Mulroney; Cameron Diaz; Rupert Everett; Philip Bosco
- Cinematography: László Kovács
- Edited by: Garth Craven; Lisa Fruchtman
- Music by: James Newton Howard
- Production companies: TriStar Pictures; Zucker Brothers Productions
- Distributed by: Sony Pictures Releasing
- Release date: June 20, 1997
- Running time: 104 minutes
- Country: United States
- Language: English
- Budget: $38 million
- Box office: $299.3 million

My Best Friend's Wedding is a 1997 American romantic comedy film directed by P. J. Hogan from a screenplay by Ronald Bass who also produced. The film stars Julia Roberts, Dermot Mulroney, Cameron Diaz, and Rupert Everett. Roberts plays a woman who discovers that her longtime friend is engaged to a much younger woman. She realizes she loves him herself and sets out to prevent the two from getting married, with only days before the wedding.

My Best Friend's Wedding received positive reviews from critics upon release and emerged as a global box-office hit. The soundtrack song "I Say a Little Prayer" was covered by singer Diana King and featured heavily in the film, making it a U.S. Billboard Hot 100 hit. The soundtrack featured a number of Burt Bacharach/Hal David songs.

My Best Friend's Wedding was nominated for the Academy Award for Best Original Musical or Comedy Score (James Newton Howard), in addition to 3 Golden Globe Award nominations – Best Motion Picture – Musical or Comedy, Best Actress – Musical or Comedy (Roberts) and Best Supporting Actor – Motion Picture (Everett). Post-release, it has often been cited as one of the best romantic comedy films of the 1990s and of all time.

== Plot ==
Three weeks before her 28th birthday, New York City food critic Julianne "Jules" Potter receives a call from her lifelong friend Michael O'Neal, a Chicago sportswriter. Years earlier, the two agreed to marry each other if they were both still single at 28. Expecting a proposal, Jules instead learns that Michael is marrying Kimmy Wallace, a college student eight years his junior whose wealthy father owns the Chicago White Sox. The wedding is scheduled for four days later, and Jules is invited.

Realizing she is in love with Michael, Jules resolves to sabotage the wedding and informs her gay confidant and editor, George Downes, of her plan. Arriving in Chicago, she meets Kimmy, who asks her to be the maid of honor. Noticing differences in the couple's interests and aspirations, Jules attempts to break them up, but her effort to humiliate Kimmy at a karaoke bar backfires. She then manipulates Kimmy into asking her father to offer Michael a lucrative job, knowing the proposal will anger him, but this attempt also fails.

Frustrated, Jules asks George for help, prompting him to fly to Chicago. On his advice, she prepares to confess her feelings to Michael but instead claims to be engaged to George, hoping to make Michael jealous. George plays along but embarrasses Jules at lunch with the wedding party through fabricated stories about their relationship, culminating in a rendition of "I Say a Little Prayer" that prompts the entire restaurant to join in. After George leaves, Jules tells Michael that their supposed relationship has ended. Aboard a water taxi, Michael admits to feeling jealous, but Jules misses another opportunity to confess her feelings. They later dance as Michael sings their song, "The Way You Look Tonight".

The day before the wedding, Jules uses the email account of Kimmy's father, Walter, to forge a message asking Michael's boss to fire him so Walter can hire him instead, supposedly at Kimmy's insistence. She saves the message without sending it but later attempts to retrieve it under the pretense of needing access to Walter's office for work, only to find it locked. Unbeknownst to her, Walter's secretary sends the message after being instructed to send emails he had written earlier that day. Michael learns of the email from his boss and, furious, calls Kimmy to cancel the wedding.

The following morning, Jules discovers that neither Michael nor Kimmy has announced their breakup. Despite her further interference, the couple reconciles. At the wedding site, Jules finally confesses her love and kisses Michael, but Kimmy witnesses the kiss and flees. Michael pursues her, followed by Jules in a caterer's truck. Jules calls George, who reminds her that Michael loves Kimmy and urges her to reunite them. Finding Michael at Chicago Union Station, Jules admits to forging the email. Michael forgives her and reveals that he proposed to Kimmy at the station. They then separate to find her.

Jules finds Kimmy in a bathroom at Comiskey Park, where Kimmy confronts her about interfering with the relationship. Jules apologizes and assures Kimmy that Michael truly loves her. The three reconcile, and the wedding proceeds as planned, with Jules delivering a heartfelt speech as Kimmy's maid of honor. She arranges for the band to play "The Way You Look Tonight" for the newlyweds, offering it as their song until they find one of their own. After exchanging farewells with Michael at the send-off, Jules is surprised to find George at the reception, and the two happily share a dance to "I Say a Little Prayer".

== Cast ==
- Julia Roberts as Julianne "Jules" Potter
- Dermot Mulroney as Michael O'Neal
- Cameron Diaz as Kimberly "Kimmy" Wallace
- Rupert Everett as George Downes
- Philip Bosco as Walter Wallace
- M. Emmet Walsh as Joe O'Neal
- Rachel Griffiths as Samantha Newhouse
- Carrie Preston as Amanda Newhouse
- Susan Sullivan as Isabelle Wallace
- Charlie Trotter as himself

In addition, Christopher Masterson plays Michael's younger brother, Scotty, while Paul Giamatti briefly appears as a bellman who encounters Julianne in a hotel hallway.

== Production ==
Filming took place in Chicago during the summer of 1996.

== Reception ==
=== Box office ===
My Best Friend's Wedding opened at No. 2 at the North American box office, making $21,678,377 USD in its opening weekend, behind Batman & Robin. It stayed in the top 10 weekly U.S. box-office for six consecutive weeks, and eventually earned $127,120,029. The worldwide gross total stands at $299,288,605 (listed as one of the 10 biggest films of 1997 both domestically and worldwide).

=== Critical reception ===
On review aggregator Rotten Tomatoes, My Best Friend's Wedding holds an approval rating of 75% based on 63 reviews, with an average rating of 6.5/10. The website's critical consensus reads, "Thanks to a charming performance from Julia Roberts and a subversive spin on the genre, My Best Friend's Wedding is a refreshingly entertaining romantic comedy." On Metacritic, the film has a weighted average score of 50 out of 100 based on 23 critics, indicating "mixed or average reviews". Audiences polled by CinemaScore gave the film an average grade of "A−" on an A+ to F scale.

Total Film praised the film, giving it four stars out of five and stating "[h]ere [Roberts] banishes all memories of Mary Reilly (1996) and I Love Trouble (1994) with a lively, nay sparkling, performance. Smiling that killer smile, shedding those winning tears, delivering great lines with effortless charm, Roberts is back where she rightly belongs - not in grey period costume, but as the sexy queen of laughs." The review also called the film "a perfect date movie" that "proves Roberts isn't as crap as we all thought she was."

Peter Travers of Rolling Stone praises Roberts as "riper, more dexterous with a comic line, slyer with modulation," concluding that "Roberts puts her heart into this one." Joanna Berry of Radio Times gave it four stars out of five, observing that this "sparkling comedy" proved to be a career-resurrecting film for Julia Roberts.

Roger Ebert of the Chicago Sun-Times gave the film three out of four stars and said, "One of the pleasures of Ronald Bass' screenplay is the way it subverts the usual comic formulas that would fuel a plot like this." CNN movie reviewer Carol Buckland said Roberts "lights up the screen", calling the film "fluffy fun".

Andrew Johnston, writing in Time Out New York, observed, "The best scene occurs when Julianne's gay editor and confidant George (Everett) turns up in Chicago and poses as her fiancé, seizing control of the film for five delicious minutes. His devilish impersonation of a straight guy is priceless, and things only get better when he leads a sing-along at the rehearsal dinner. At times like this, when the film spins into pop culture overdrive it stops being a star vehicle and flirts with genuine comic brilliance." Michelle Regna of BuzzFeed, in 2015, claimed it is one of the greatest romantic comedy films of all time.

=== Awards and recognition ===
Accolade	Category	Recipient	Result	Ref.
Academy Awards	Best Original Musical or Comedy Score	James Newton Howard	Nominated	
ALMA Awards	Outstanding Individual Performance in a Crossover Role in a Feature Film	Cameron Diaz	Won	
American Comedy Awards	Funniest Supporting Actor in a Motion Picture	Rupert Everett	Won	
ASCAP Film and Television Music Awards	Top Box Office Films	James Newton Howard (also for Dante's Peak)	Won	
Awards Circuit Community Awards	Honorable Mentions	My Best Friend's Wedding	Nominated	
Blockbuster Entertainment Awards	Favorite Actress – Comedy	Julia Roberts	Won	
Blockbuster Entertainment Awards	Favorite Supporting Actor – Comedy	Rupert Everett	Won	
Blockbuster Entertainment Awards	Favorite Supporting Actress – Comedy	Cameron Diaz	Won	
Bogey Awards			Won	
British Academy Film Awards	Best Actor in a Supporting Role	Rupert Everett	Nominated	
Casting Society of America	Best Casting for Feature Film – Comedy	David Rubin	Nominated	
Chlotrudis Awards	Best Supporting Actor	Rupert Everett	Nominated	
Florida Film Critics Circle Awards	Best Supporting Actor	Rupert Everett	Won	
GLAAD Media Awards	Outstanding Film – Wide Release	My Best Friend's Wedding	Nominated	
Golden Screen Awards			Won	
Golden Globe Awards	Best Motion Picture – Comedy or Musical	My Best Friend's Wedding	Nominated	
Golden Globe Awards	Best Actress in a Motion Picture – Comedy or Musical	Julia Roberts	Nominated	
Golden Globe Awards	Best Supporting Actor in a Motion Picture	Rupert Everett	Nominated	
London Critics Circle Film Awards	British Supporting Actor of the Year	Rupert Everett	Won	
MTV Movie Awards	Best Female Performance	Julia Roberts	Nominated	
MTV Movie Awards	Best Breakthrough Performance	Rupert Everett	Nominated	
MTV Movie Awards	Best Comedic Performance	Rupert Everett	Nominated	
National Society of Film Critics Awards	Best Supporting Actor	Rupert Everett	Nominated	
Online Film & Television Association Awards	Best Picture – Comedy or Musical	Ronald Bass; Jerry Zucker	Nominated	
Online Film & Television Association Awards	Best Actor – Comedy or Musical	Rupert Everett	Nominated	
Online Film & Television Association Awards	Best Supporting Actor	Rupert Everett	Nominated	
Online Film & Television Association Awards	Best Actress – Comedy or Musical	Julia Roberts	Nominated	
Online Film & Television Association Awards	Best Title Sequences		Nominated	
Online Film & Television Association Awards	Best Music – Adapted Song	"Wishin' and Hopin' "	Nominated	
Online Film & Television Association Awards	Best Music – Adapted Song	"I Say a Little Prayer"	Won	
Online Film Critics Society Awards	Best Supporting Actor	Rupert Everett	Nominated	
Satellite Awards	Best Motion Picture – Comedy or Musical	My Best Friend's Wedding	Nominated	
Satellite Awards	Best Actress in a Motion Picture – Comedy or Musical	Julia Roberts	Nominated	
Satellite Awards	Best Supporting Actor in a Motion Picture – Comedy or Musical	Rupert Everett	Won	
Satellite Awards	Best Supporting Actress in a Motion Picture – Comedy or Musical	Cameron Diaz	Nominated	

== Soundtrack ==
My Best Friend's Wedding: Music from the Motion Picture

Soundtrack album by various artists
- Released: 17 June 1997
- Genre: Pop/Rock
- Length: 46:42
- Label: Epic Records

The soundtrack was released on June 17, 1997, and contains covers of familiar songs. It was praised by AllMusic for working "better than it should, since most of the vocalists... concentrate on the songs".

No.	Title	Writer(s)	Recording artist(s)	Length
1.	"I Say a Little Prayer"	Burt Bacharach / Hal David	Diana King	3:37
2.	"Wishin' and Hopin'"	Burt Bacharach / Hal David	Ani DiFranco	3:17
3.	"You Don't Know Me"	Eddy Arnold / Cindy Walker	Jann Arden	3:27
4.	"Tell Him"	Bert Berns	The Exciters	2:36
5.	"I Just Don't Know What to Do with Myself"	Burt Bacharach / Hal David	Nicky Holland	4:20
6.	"I'll Be Okay"	Tena Clark / Greg Wells	Amanda Marshall	4:58
7.	"The Way You Look Tonight"	Jerome Kern / Dorothy Fields	Tony Bennett	3:25
8.	"What the World Needs Now Is Love"	Burt Bacharach / Hal David	Jackie DeShannon	3:14
9.	"I'll Never Fall in Love Again"	Burt Bacharach / Hal David	Mary Chapin Carpenter	3:52
10.	"Always You"	Lars Halapi	Sophie Zelmani	2:52
11.	"If You Wanna Be Happy"	Roaring Lion / Joseph Royster / Carmella Guida / Frank Guida	Jimmy Soul	2:23
12.	"I Say a Little Prayer"	Burt Bacharach / Hal David	The Cast of My Best Friend's Wedding	2:30
13.	"Suite From My Best Friend's Wedding"	James Newton Howard	James Newton Howard	6:11
Total length:				46:42

Chart positions

Chart (1997-1998)	Peak position
Australian Albums (ARIA)	1
Austrian Albums (Ö3 Austria)	11
Canadian Albums (Billboard)	19
French Albums (SNEP)	40
German Albums (Offizielle Top 100)	34
Hungarian Albums (MAHASZ)	22
New Zealand Albums (RMNZ)	33
Swiss Albums (Schweizer Hitparade)	29
US Billboard 200	14

=== Certifications ===
Region	Certification	Certified units/sales
Australia (ARIA)	2× Platinum	140,000^{^}
Canada (Music Canada)	Gold	50,000^{^}
Hong Kong (IFPI Hong Kong)	Gold	10,000^{*}
United Kingdom (BPI)	Silver	60,000^{*}
United States (RIAA)	2× Platinum	1,930,000
^{*} Sales figures based on certification alone.^{^} Shipments figures based on certification alone.

== Remakes ==
Two official remakes with the same title have been released.

- A Chinese version was released in China on August 5, 2016.
- A Mexican remake was presented in Mexico on February 14, 2019.

In addition, the 2002 Bollywood film Mere Yaar Ki Shaadi Hai ("It's My Friend's Wedding") and the 2000 Kollywood film Parthen Rasithen were partially inspired by the film.

== Stage musical ==
A stage musical adaptation of the film featuring songs by Burt Bacharach and Hal David and a book by screenplay writer Ronald Bass and Jonathan Harvey was announced to open in September 2021 (originally due to open September 2020 but postponed due to the COVID-19 pandemic) on a UK and Ireland tour, and was due to be directed by Rachel Kavanaugh and star Alexandra Burke as Julianne Potter. However on June 30, 2021, it was announced that the production was canceled due to the impact of the COVID-19 pandemic, with the producers revealing they hope to revisit the show at a later date.

The musical made its world premiere at the Ogunquit Playhouse in Fall 2024, running from September 26 to October 27.

== Sequel ==
While promoting his Netflix show The Hunting Wives, Dermot Mulroney revealed to the New York Post that talks of a sequel are underway. On July 29, 2025, the sequel was finally announced to be in early development, with Celine Song to write the screenplay.
