= Eduardo Chapero-Jackson =

Spanish film director

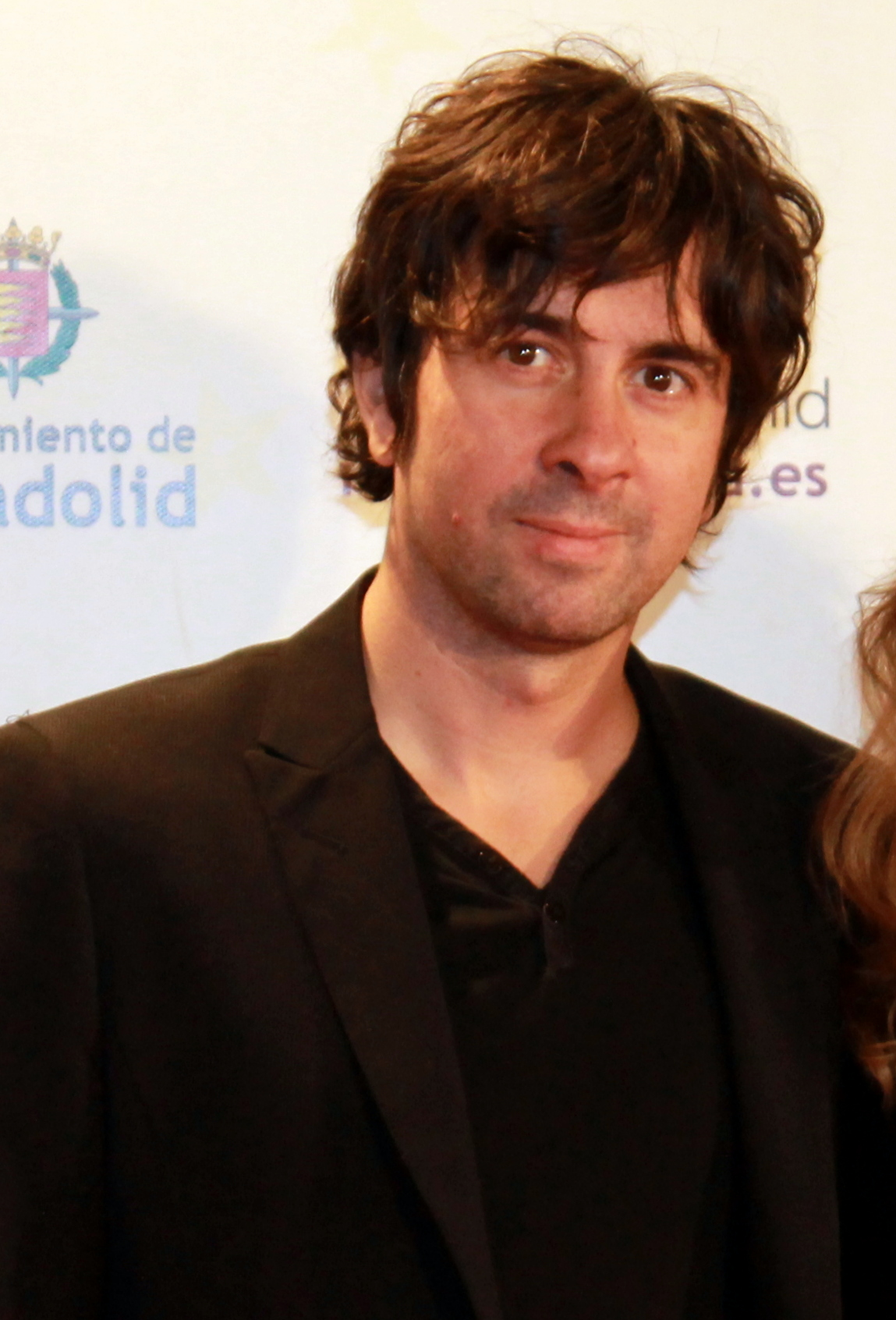
- Born: 1971 (age 54–55); Madrid, Spain
- Occupation: Film director
- Years active: 2005–present

Eduardo Chapero-Jackson (born 1971) is a Spanish film director. He is best known for his short films.
