= Acacias 38 =

Soap opera

- Genre: Soap opera; Period drama
- Created by: Susana López Rubio; Aurora Guerra; Miquel Peidró; Josep Cister Rubio
- Directed by: Humberto Miró; Luis Santamaría; Rubén Torrejón; Carlos Navarro Ballesteros; Isaac Cantero; Javier Pulido; María Pulido; David Montoya Castillo; Carlota Martínez-Pereda; David Ulloa; Carlos Navarro
- Theme music composer: Alex Conrado
- Opening theme: "Acacias 38"
- Country of origin: Spain
- Original language: Spanish
- No. of seasons: 7
- No. of episodes: 1483

Production
- Executive producers: Humberto Miró; Luis Santamaría
- Producers: Production Director: M. A. Caballero Brid
- Running time: 55 minutes (approx.) (Seasons 1-4); 50 minutes (approx.) (Seasons 5-7)
- Production company: Boomerang TV for Televisión Española

Original release
- Network: La 1
- Release: 6 January 2015 – 30 September 2021

Acacias 38 is a Spanish soap opera television series produced by Boomerang TV for Televisión Española (TVE) that originally aired on La1 from 2 April 2015 to 13 May 2021. The fiction is set in building 38 Acacias Street, in Madrid. The start of the series was set in 1899. By the fifth season, it was set in 1913. The seventh season took a 5-year time leap to 1920.

In March 2020, the filming was interrupted due to the health emergency of the COVID-19 pandemic in Spain, to then restart in mid-May. To avoid running out of chapters, TVE aired half an episode of the series every day, for a total of two and a half chapters per week. From 15 June 2020, the series will reissue the full chapters after the return of the actors to the filming. On 29 January 2021, the cancellation of the series was announced, which would end its filming in March and its broadcasts in May. Days later, TVE reported that a spin-off of the series is being studied focused on the love of Camino (Aria Bedmar) and Maite (Ylenia Baglietto) in Paris, which had already sparked a spin-off in podcast format, #Maitino: el podcast.

== Synopsis ==
It tells the history of Spain in the year 1899 to the year 1920. Spain has just suffered the disaster of the Spanish-American War. It focuses on bourgeois families and the life of a group of maids who work for them. The families are: The Álvarez-Hermoso family, The de la Serna family, The Hidalgo family, The Palacios family, The Sélers family, The Ferrero family, The Méndez family, The Quesada family, The Domínguez family, The Sacristán family and The Alday family.

=== First season (0-220) ===
In Spain in the year 1899 to the year 1900. A young pregnant woman named Carmen Blasco believes that she has ended the life of her husband Justo Núñez when he was going to beat her for the umpteenth time. Carmen flees with her mother Teresa from her home so as not to be arrested, but during the flight her waters break and she gives birth to a girl, Inocencia, whom she is sadly forced to abandon in a convent to give her a better life.

Carmen and Teresa, wanted by the police, settle in the rich Acacias neighborhood of a large Spanish city, probably Madrid, and change their identity. Carmen becomes Manuela Manzano, and Teresa becomes Guadalupe and they find work as maids in the large building on Acacias Street, portal number 38.

Manuela begins to work for the de la Serna and falls in love with Germán, her lord, but both will have to fight for their love, encountering obstacles such as Cayetana, Germán's evil wife, Justo, Manuela's husband, who is still alive and Úrsula is Doña Cayetana's faithful governess. Manuela will also discover that her daughter Inocencia is in Acacias.

At the end of the season Manuela and Germán plan to fake their death to accuse Cayetana of it. This and Úrsula discover their plans and poison Manuela, killing her. Germán, broken by grief, has no choice but to commit suicide for real. Finally, Germán and Manuela will be able to reconcile in Paradise and live together there forever.

=== Second season (221-581) ===
In Spain in the year 1900 to the year 1901. The romantic protagonists of the second season are Teresa Sierra and Mauro San Emeterio. She is a simple teacher in a convent and he is a police inspector who is sent to solve the case of the deaths of Manuela and Germán.

Mauro discovers that Teresa is the real Cayetana Sotelo-Ruz and that Germán's wife is called Anita, and is the daughter of his maid Fabiana. This exchange of people occurred when they were both girls and a disastrous fire broke out at the Sotelo-Ruz residence that killed the entire family. Fabiana only managed to save her daughter Anita from that stake, and believing that the real Cayetana was dead, she decided that her daughter would pass as Cayetana Sotelo-Ruz.

Faced with this truth, Cayetana vows to make life impossible for Mauro and Teresa. In this season he loses the help of Úrsula and begins a violent war against her. Meanwhile, Mauro and Teresa fall in love, but their relationship will be hampered by Cayetana, Humildad, Mauro's wife, and Fernando, Teresa's husband.

At the end of the season, everyone discovers the true identities of Cayetana and Teresa. Úrsula decides to take revenge on Cayetana for all the evil she did and marries Jaime Alday, her biological father. Ultimately, Úrsula ends the life of her enemy by placing a bomb in her house that causes a fire. Finally Teresa and Mauro will be free to live their love and will leave the neighborhood, going to France.

=== Third season (582-823) ===
In Spain in the year 1901 to the year 1902. The romantic protagonists of the third season are Blanca Dicenta and Diego Alday. She is Úrsula's secret daughter, locked up in an asylum for many years and he is the son of Jaime Alday, then Cayetana's stepbrother and Doña Úrsula's stepson.

After finishing with Cayetana, Úrsula moves into her apartment with her new family: now she is a lady. Blanca leaves the psychiatric hospital where her mother locked her up thanks to Samuel, Jaime's second son. The two will eventually fall in love and get married. Right after Diego arrives and Blanca realizes that she no longer loves Samuel, but her brother. Blanca ends up getting pregnant with Diego, although she lies saying that the child she is expecting is Samuel's.

Blanca and Diego will not be able to stop their passion and decide to leave the neighborhood, but during the flight Blanca gives birth to a child. Úrsula kidnaps her grandson, making Blanca believe that she gave birth to a girl and that she died after giving birth. On the other hand, she and Samuel will do everything possible to prevent the relationship between the two lovers.

At the end of the season, Úrsula will finally pay for all the crimes and misdeeds committed. Her father, Iván, locks her up in an asylum. Blanca and Diego recover their son Moisés and leave the neighborhood without looking back and leaving Samuel badly injured.

=== Fourth season (824-960) ===
In Spain in the year 1902 to the year 1903. The romantic protagonists of the fourth season are Telmo Martínez and Lucía Alvarado. He is the new priest in the neighborhood, while she is Celia's cousin.

Lucía begins a relationship with Samuel Alday after helping him forget about his wife Blanca. Úrsula leaves the sanatorium and is not well received by the neighbors: they all despise her and are not willing to forgive her. Úrsula is now a beggar, and sorry for all the damage she has caused. Telmo decides to welcome her as his maid.

Lucía and Telmo fall in love. What she doesn't know is that Telmo is in league with his prior, Espineira, to steal Lucía's inheritance. However, Telmo ends up falling in love with her for real. He leaves the talar habits for Lucia, days before her wedding with Samuel. The young woman cannot take the step and leaves Samuel at the altar. Finally, Lucía discovers that Telmo tried to cheat on her with Espineira and breaks up with him.

On the other hand, Trini and Celia both get pregnant, but Celia loses the child for running an errand for her friend. Trini gives birth to a girl, Milagros, and Celia decides to take revenge on her because she blames her for the death of her baby. Mentally obsessed with little Milagros, she ends Trini's life and will do everything possible to keep the girl. One night, Celia tries to take Milagros away but is discovered by Ramón. In the end, Celia tries to kill Ramón as well, but accidentally falls out the window and dies on the spot. They all blame Ramón.

=== Fifth season (961-1301) ===
In Spain in the year 1913 to the year 1914. Ten years have passed after Celia's death and Ramón is still in jail accused of her death. Although with the help of his son he achieves freedom, Felipe continues to believe him guilty and will do everything in his power to take him back to prison. Finally, Ramón proves his innocence to the neighborhood by telling the truth and the two friends reconcile.

Meanwhile, Lucía is unhappily married to Eduardo Torralba and has a son, Mateo, who is actually Telmo's biological son. Telmo returns to Acacias after declaring his innocence and resumes the relationship with Lucia. However, her happiness lasts very little: Lucia contracts a deadly cancer and dies. Úrsula kills Eduardo and Telmo leaves the neighborhood with his son, leaving Úrsula living on the streets.

On the other hand, Samuel Alday returns to the neighborhood with his new wife, Genoveva Salmerón, a prostitute. Samuel dies at the hands of Genoveva's former protector, Cristóbal Cabrera. The widow begins an atrocious revenge against the neighbors, because none of them helped Samuel financially before he died. In this fight, she has the help of Úrsula and Alfredo Bryce, her second husband, a famous banker. However, Genoveva falls in love with Felipe and abandons her desire for revenge against everyone, killing her husband. However, Felipe maintains a clandestine relationship with his Brazilian maid Marcia. Genoveva tries to hamper their relationship in the first place by bringing Marcia's husband, Santiago Becerra, who is actually Israel, her twin brother. Together with Becerra Genoveva ends forever with Úrsula, who had turned against her. Genoveva manages to marry Felipe, although this is not enough to separate the lovers and finally Genoveva ends up killing Marcia.

After Marcia's death, Felipe is devastated and Genoveva is accused of murder. Felipe does everything possible to incriminate his wife, but Genoveva is acquitted with the help of his lawyer, Velasco, and his maid Laura. Felipe plans to go to Cuba to find Becerra and to prevent it, Velasco tasks Laura with his murder behind Genoveva's back. Laura poisons Felipe forced by Velasco who threatens to harm her and her sister and Felipe ends up in a coma. When he wakes up, he does not remember anything about what happened, he does not remember Marcia or Genoveva and he continues to hate Ramón for having killed his wife.

Laura, after Velasco's threats, kills him, after Velasco tried to kill Genoveva. Felipe and Ramón reconcile and Genoveva tells Felipe that she is his wife. Genoveva does not want Felipe to know anything about Marcia, not her murder, or her trial, so she tells the Acacias neighbors that they cannot say anything so as not to force her memory.

At the end of the season, Santiago returns, kidnaps Felipe and Genoveva and tortures Felipe, Genoveva after seeing her husband thus reveals to Santiago and Felipe all the truth including the murder of Marcia. In the end it is revealed that everything was a plan of Felipe, who remembered everything perfectly.

=== Season six (1302-1403) ===
In Spain in the year 1914 to the year 1915. Some time later many things have changed. Genoveva ends up in jail after discovering that it was she who murdered Marcia, and from jail she will seek revenge, thanks to the movements she has made from jail, she is declared innocent for the second time of Marcia's murder, being released in a formal way imminent.

Marcos Bacigalupe returns to Acacias after his departure to Mexico. He has finally managed to seal peace with Don Salustiano Quesada, but not everything is good news: in his absence Felicia died in his Cantabrian town. Eventually Marcos begins to embark on a secret relationship with his maid Soledad.

Genoveva joins forces with the Quesada brothers and forces Marcos to modify the signed contract. Genoveva asks Natalia to seduce Felipe to culminate her revenge against him, but by doing this the young Quesada falls in love with the lawyer. Meanwhile, it is known that the person who murdered Felicia was not Natalia, but Soledad. When Marcos finds out, she decides to hide with the help of Aurelio, who wants to know, after discovering him, who Fausto Salazar is and why Soledad has dynamite. It is discovered that Soledad in the past was an anarchist and now her old colleagues want her to organize an attack in Acacias. Aurelio and Genoveva decide to participate in the attack to get rid of the neighbors, and they also want to finish off Felipe and the Bacigalupe.

Natalia confesses to Genoveva that during her stay in Mexico, she was raped by Marcos and that this traumatized her forever. Genoveva tells Felipe, who is arguing in the middle of the street with the Bacigalupe. Afterwards, Genoveva urges Natalia to kill Marcos to get revenge on him, but it will be Felipe who will be arrested for his murder. To avoid this, Natalia confesses that she is behind what happened.

Aurelio secretly marries Anabel Bacigalupe, but is not really in love with her, since his plan is to kill her to keep the entire Bacigalupe fortune.

Finally, the attack occurs and a bomb explodes in Acacias. Several neighbors, including Antoñito and Carmen, lose their lives. At the same time, Anabel is murdered by Aurelio, and Genoveva orders Natalia's death after learning of her confession.

=== Seventh season (1404-1483) ===
In Spain in the year 1920. Five years after the attack, all the residents participate in a commemorative mass in honor of the victims. Survivors remember those who are gone.

Genoveva and Aurelio return to the neighborhood, after getting married and having been away all that time.

Don Felipe after the bomb attack fell into a deep depression and is now assisted by Adoración "Dori" Navarro Bellido, a nurse who is actually a psychology student with whom he falls in love. Something similar happens with Don Ramón, who has become a dark and bitter man after the deaths of his son and of his wife.

But not everything has been unfortunate in these five years: a new couple walks the streets of the neighborhood. They are David and Valeria, a young married couple who are the envy of everyone in Acacias. However, what no one knows is that Valeria is not really David's wife, but that they are faking their marriage before the neighbors forced by Aurelio Quesada and behind Genoveva's back. Some time later, Aurelio discovers that Genoveva ordered Natalia's death in jail and he is willing to kill her, but Genoveva blackmails her husband since she has photos where Aurelio is seen killing Anabel on the day of the attack.

Shortly after, we learn that Valeria's real husband is the chemist Rodrigo Lluch, who discovered a lethal gas whose formula Aurelio wants to find. To do this, Aurelio had faked the marriage between David and Valeria, thus trying to attract the chemist. What Aurelio doesn't know is that David and Valeria have fallen madly in love, and plan to elope together from the neighborhood. However, Rodrigo suddenly appears willing to give in to the Quesada's blackmail to get his wife back.

== Seasons ==
Series	Episodes	Originally released			#	Ref.
Series	Episodes	First released	Last released	Network	#	Ref.
1	220	15 April 2015	18 February 2016	tve	1–220	-
2	361	19 February 2016	16 August 2017	tve	221–581	
3	242	17 August 2017	9 August 2018	tve	582–823	
4	137	10 August 2018	28 February 2019	tve	824–960	
5	341	1 March 2019	6 August 2020	tve	961–1301	
6	101	7 August 2020	8 January 2021	tve	1302–1402	-
7	81	8 January 2021	4 May 2021	tve	1403–1483	

== Cast ==
- Ana del Rey as Doña Trinidad "Trini" Crespo Molero de Palacios (episodes 1-940)
- Manuel Bandera as Don José Miguel Domínguez Chinarro (episodes 961–1286; episodes 1302–1483)
- Sandra Blázquez as Huertas López Valbuena (episodes 358–470; episodes 699–732)
- Gonzalo Ramos as Rodrigo Lluch (episodes 1443-1469)
- Carla Campra as Daniela Stabile (episodes 1341-1384)
- José Pastor as Don Emilio Pasamar Fonseca (episodes 961–1228; episodes 1399–1402)
- Silvia Marty as Soledad López (episodes 1251-1403)
- Elia Galera as Doña Silvia Reyes vda. de Zavala (episodes 681–823)
- David V. Muro as Servando Gallo (episodes 1-1483)
- Marc Parejo as Don Felipe Álvarez-Hermoso (episodes 1–581; episodes 632–1226; episodes 1249–1483)
- Leonor Martín as Señorita Adoración "Dori" Navarro Bellido (episodes 1416-1483)
- Alejandro Sigüenza as Don Fidel Soria (episodes 1418–1483)
- Octavi Pujades as Don Pascual Sacristán Tordera (episodes 1424–1483)
- Roser Tapias as Doña Valeria Cárdenas de Lluch (episodes 1403–1473)
- Julio Peña Fernández as Guillermo Sacristán (episodes 1404–1483)
- Inma Sancho as Doña Inmaculada "Inma" Tordera vda. de Sacristán (episodes 1404–1483)
- Iago García as Don Justo Núñez (episodes 1–206)
- Sheyla Fariña as Doña Manuela Manzano vda. de Núñez/Doña Carmen Blasco Serra vda. de Núñez (episodes 1–220)
- Roger Berruezo as Don Germán de la Serna (episodes 1–220)
- Arantxa Aranguren as Teresa Serra vda. de Blasco/Guadalupe Serra vda. de Blasco (episodes 1–400)
- Aurora Sánchez as Paciencia Infante de Gallo (episodes 1–420)
- Sara Miquel as Doña Cayetana Sotelo-Ruz vda. de la Serna/Doña Anita Alday Aguado vda. de la Serna (episodes 1–576; episodes 1131–1135)
- Jaime Olías as Don Claudio Castaño (episodes 4–130)
- Cuca Escribano as Doña Lourdes Ruzafa de Palacios (episodes 195–252)
- Alejandra Meco as Doña Teresa Sierra de San Emeterio/Doña Cayetana Sotelo-Ruz de San Emeterio (episodes 232–581)
- Jordi Coll as Don Simón Gayarre (episodes 404–676)
- Elena González as Doña Blanca Dicenta de Alday (episodes 566–820)
- Miguel Diosdado as Don Víctor Ferrero Lorza/Don Víctor Séler Lorza (episodes 1–689; episodes 925–928)
- Inés Aldea as Doña Celia Verdejo Pedró de Álvarez-Hermoso (episodes 1–960; episode 983; episodes 990–992)
- Daniel Tatay as Don Telmo Martínez (episode 817; episodes 823–1000)
- Montserrat Alcoverro as Doña Úrsula Dicenta vda. de Alday/Doña Úrsula Koval vda. de Alday (episodes 67–300; episodes 365–802; episodes 830–1171)
- Pilar Barrera as Agustina López (episodes 686–1217)
- Ylenia Baglietto as Maite Zaldúa Caballero (episodes 1132–1214; episodes 1276–1283)
- Agnès Llobet as Laura Alonso (episodes 1203–1281; episodes 1298–1301)
- Susana Soleto as Doña Felicia Fonseca de Bacigalupe, vda. de Pasamar (episodes 961–1303)
- Gurutze Beitia as Arantxa Torrealday Yurrebaso de Villar (episodes 961–1186; episodes 1226–1228; episodes 1326–1330)
- Marcial Álvarez as Don Marcos Bacigalupe (episodes 1221–1402)
- Marian Arahuetes as Doña Adela de Gayarre (episodes 513–677)
- Abril Montilla as Doña Alodia de Quiroga (episodes 1201–1286; episodes 1303–1483)
- Sandra Marchena as Doña Rosa María "Rosina" Rubio de Méndez, vda. de Hidalgo (episodes 1-1483)
- Inma Pérez-Quirós as Fabiana Aguado de Gallo (episodes 1-1483)
- Marita Zafra as Casilda Escolano Ibáñez vda. de Enraje (episodes 1-1483)
- Clara Garrido as Doña Genoveva Salmerón de Quesada, vda. de Alday y de Bryce (episodes 961-1483)
- Juanma Navas as Don Ramón Palacios Jarabo (episodes 1–761; episodes 781–1483)
- Jorge Pobes as Don Liberto Méndez Aspe (episodes 322–1483)
- María Gracia as Doña María Bella "Bellita" del Campo de Domínguez (episodes 961–1286; episodes 1315–1483)
- Rebeca Alemañy as Doña María Dolores "Lolita" Casado vda. de Palacios (episodes 1335–1483)
- Jona García as Jacinto Retuerto (episodes 617–667; episodes 693–703; episodes 742–785; episodes 924–1483)
- Raúl Cano Cano as Don Leandro Séler Ruiz (episodes 1–392; episodes 504–517)
- Marco Cáceres as Don Ignacio Quiroga del Campo (episodes 1341–1481)
- Aleix Rengel Meca as Don David Expósito (episodes 1403–1473)
- Isabel Garrido as Maruxa "Maruxiña" Corrales (episodes 1403–1483)
- Patxi Santamaría as Don Marcelo Gaztañaga (episodes 1404–1483)
- Amaia Lizarralde as Doña Hortensia Rubio vda. de Quiñonero (episodes 1405–1483)
- Judith Fernández as Señorita Azucena Quiñonero Rubio (episodes 1405–1483)
- Carlos de Austria as Don Aurelio Quesada (episodes 1286–1468; episodes 1480–1483)
- Noelia Marló as Luzdivina Suárez Rebollo (episodes 1409–1483)
- Lydia Pavón as Gabriela Salmerón (episodes 1472–1483)
- Andrea López as Carlota de la Serna Sotelo-Ruz/Carlota de la Serna Alday (episodes 1–64; episode 220)
- Sara Herranz as Rita Carrasco (episodes 1–130)
- Mariano Llorente as Don Maximiliano Hidalgo (episodes 1–270; episodes 350–368)
- María Tasende as Doña Juliana Lorza de Séler, vda. de Ferrero (episodes 1–392; episodes 504–517)
- Carlos García-Clark as Don Pablo Blasco Serra (episodes 1–411; episodes 465–586)
- Mónica Portillo as Doña Humildad Varela de San Emeterio (episodes 245–384)
- Ander Azurmendi as Don Fernando Mondragón (episodes 389–509)
- Laura Rozalén as Doña Elvira Valverde de Gayarre (episodes 404–520; episodes 611–676)
- Javi Chou as Don Martín Enraje (episodes 236–273)
- Carlos Olalla as Don Jaime Moisés Alday (episodes 556–610; episode 657; episodes 690–731)
- Manuel Regueiro as Don Arturo Valverde (episodes 404–820)
- Rubén de Eguía as Don Diego Alday Roncero (episodes 583–820)
- Adrián Castiñeiras as Don Íñigo "El Peña" Cervera (episodes 741–878)
- Cristina Abad as Doña María Luisa Palacios Ruzafa de Ferrero (episodes 1–689; episodes 925–928)
- Alba Brunet as Doña Leonor Hidalgo Rubio de Barbosa, vda. de Blasco (episodes 1–411; episodes 475–960; episode 1483)
- Alejandra Lorenzo as Flora Barbosa (episodes 686–960)
- Xoán Fórneas as Don Íñigo Cervera/Don Ignacio Barbosa (episodes 686–960)
- Paco Mora as Don Eduardo Torralba, Marqués consorte de Válmez (episodes 961–994)
- Alba Gutiérrez as Doña Lucía Alvarado vda. de Torralba, Marquesa de Válmez (episodes 779–787; episodes 802–999)
- Juan Garda as Don Samuel Alday Roncero (episodes 557–997)
- Eleazar Ortiz as Don Alfredo Bryce (episodes 1004–1064)
- Gonzalo Trujillo as Don Mauro San Emeterio Garrido (episodes 221–581; episodes 1078–1110)
- Trisha Fernández as Doña Marcia Sampaio Álvez vda. de Becerra (episodes 1029–1211; episode 1216; episode 1256)
- Antonio Lozano as Don Armando Caballero (episodes 221–581; episodes 1101–1130; episodes 1202–1275; episodes 1482–1483)
- Amparo Fernández as Doña Susana Ruiz de Caballero, vda. de Séler (episodes 1–1130; episodes 1202–1256; episodes 1202–1275; episodes 1482–1483)
- Cristina Platas as Doña Marcelina de Retuerto (episodes 703–705; episodes 902–1276)
- Aria Bedmar as Doña Camino Pasamar Fonseca vda. de Cortés (episodes 961–1283)
- Cisco Lara as Don Ildefonso Cortés (episodes 1172–1266)
- Aleix Melé as Don Santiago Becerra/Don Israel Becerra (episodes 1110–1206; episodes 1286–1301)
- Olga Haenke as Doña Anabel Bacigalupe de Quesada (episodes 1232–1403)
- César Vea as Cesáreo Villar (episodes 785–1330)
- Mikel Larrañaga as Don Roberto Olmedo (episodes 1263–1336; episodes 1351–1386)
- Ana Goya as Doña Sabina Muñiz de Olmedo (episodes 1263–1386)
- Pablo Carro as Don Miguel Olmedo (episodes 1264–1386)
- Aroa Rodríguez as Doña Cinta Domínguez del Campo de Pasamar (episodes 966–1228; episodes 1399–1402)
- María Blanco as Doña Carmen Sanjurjo/Doña Carmen Asensio de Palacios, vda. de Andrade (episodes 554–1403)
- Ástrid Janer as Señorita Natalia Quesada (episodes 1286–1403)
- Álvaro Quintana as Don Antonio "Antoñito" Palacios Ruzafa (episodes 961–1186; episodes 517–761; episodes 781–1345; episodes 1359–1403)
- David García-Intriago as Don Adolfo Méndez (episodes 502–1402)
- Óscar Ortuño as Cayetano "Tano" Gutiérrez Manchuela/Cayetano "Tano" Álvarez-Hermoso Verdejo (episodes 133–335)
- Adrián Hernández as Mateo Torralba Alvarado/Mateo Martínez Alvarado (episodes 961–1000)
- María Cordero as Inocencia Núñez Blasco/Adriana Álvarez-Hermoso Verdejo (episodes 1–206; episode 220)

== International versions ==
Region/country	Local name	Network	Date premiered	Date ended
Egypt	ليالي أوجيني Eugénie Nights مسلسل ليالي أوجيني eugenie nights مسلسل ليالي أوجيني Layali Eugenie	Beelink Productions; Eagle Films	2018	2018
