= Perdiendo el juicio (2025 TV series) =

- Promotional release poster
- Created by: Susana López Rubio; Javier Holgado; Jaime Olías
- Written by: Susana López Rubio; Javier Holgado; Jaime Olías
- Directed by: María Togores; Pablo Guerrero; Jaime Olías
- Starring: Elena Rivera; Manu Baqueiro; Miquel Fernández; Lucía Caraballo; Daniel Ibáñez; Alfonso Lara; Carol Rovira; Dafne Fernández
- Country of origin: Spain
- Original language: Spanish
- No. of seasons: 1
- No. of episodes: 10

Production
- Executive producers: Montse García; Luis Santamaría
- Cinematography: José Luis Pulido
- Production companies: Atresmedia TV; Boomerang TV

Original release
- Network: Atresplayer
- Release: 23 March 2025

Perdiendo el juicio is a 2025 Spanish legal drama television series created by Susana López Rubio, Javier Holgado, and Jaime Olías. It stars Elena Rivera alongside Manu Baqueiro and Miquel Fernández.

== Plot ==
Prestigious lawyer Amanda Torres suffers an OCD attack during an important trial. Fired from her job, her professional career hits a low, and joins an unrenowned law firm. Meanwhile, she navigates the relationship with her husband César (with whom she has to sign divorce papers) and a legal murder case defending her sister Daniela.

== Cast ==
- Elena Rivera as Amanda Torres
- Manu Baqueiro as Gabriel
- Miquel Fernández as César
- Lucía Caraballo as Barbie
- Daniel Ibáñez as Bosco
- Alfonso Lara as Rafa
- Carol Rovira as Daniela
- Dafne Fernández as Sara
- María Pujalte
- María León
- Eloy Azorín
- Luis Bermejo
- Federico Aguado
- Antonio Garrido
- Clara Garrido

== Production ==
Created by Susana López Rubio, Javier Holgado, and Jaime Olías, Perdiendo el juicio is an Atresplayer original series produced by Atresmedia TV in collaboration with Boomerang TV, with Montse García and Luis Santamaría serving as executive producers. The 10-episode series was shot from September to December 2024 in Madrid and its surroundings.

== Release ==
The series made it to the television series slate of the 28th Málaga Film Festival for its presentation. It premiered on Atresplayer on 23 March 2025.

== See also ==
- 2025 in Spanish television
