= Inés of My Soul (TV series) =

Historical drama television series

- Spanish: Inés del alma mía
- Genre: Historical drama
- Based on: Inés of My Soul by Isabel Allende
- Written by: Paco Mateo
- Directed by: Alejandro Bazzano; Nicolás Acuña
- Countries of origin: Spain; Chile
- Original language: Spanish
- No. of episodes: 8

Production
- Production companies: RTVE; Boomerang TV; Chilevisión

Original release
- Network: Amazon Prime Video
- Release: July 31, 2020

Inés of My Soul (Spanish: Inés del alma mía) is a 2020 historical drama television series produced by RTVE, Boomerang TV, and Chilevisión based on the historical novel of the same name by Isabel Allende. The filming of the series began on 2 September 2019, and concluded in December 2019. A total of 8 episodes were confirmed for the series, which premiered on 31 July 2020 on Amazon Prime Video, solely in Spain. The episodes aired weekly on La 1 from 7 October 2020 to 25 November 2020. The episodes aired on Chilevisión from 14 September 2021 to 17 September 2021.

== Cast ==
- Elena Rivera as Inés Suárez
- Eduardo Noriega as Pedro de Valdivia
- Benjamín Vicuña as Rodrigo de Quiroga
- Carlos Bardem as Diego de Almagro
- Enrique Arce as Sancho de la Hoz
- Francesc Orella as Francisco Pizarro
- Carlos Serrano as Juan de Málaga
- Daniela Ramírez as Marina Ortiz de Gaete
- Federico Aguado as Hernando Pizarro
- Ismael Martínez as Francisco de Aguirre
- Andrea Trepat as María Asunción Suárez, Inés' sister
- Antonia Giesen as Cecilia, Inca princess
- Pedro Fontaine as Juan Gómez
- Rafael de la Reguera as Monroy
- Nicolás Zárate as Alderete
- Gastón Salgado as Michimalonco
- Elvis Fuentes as Marmolejo
- Patricia Cuyul as Catalina, Inés' maid in South America
- Francisco Ossa as Don Benito
- Juan Fernández as Don Alonso.

== Episodes ==
| No. | Title | Directed by | Written by | Original release date |
|---|---|---|---|---|
| 1 | "Un nuevo mundo" | Alejandro Bazzano | Paco Mateo | July 31, 2020 |
| 2 | "La conquista de un sueño" | Alejandro Bazzano | Paco Mateo | July 31, 2020 |
| 3 | "La muerte, menos temida, da más vida" | Nicolás Acuña | Paco Mateo | July 31, 2020 |
| 4 | "La tierra prometida" | Nicolás Acuña | Paco Mateo | July 31, 2020 |
| 5 | "Sangre y fuego" | Alejandro Bazzano | Paco Mateo | July 31, 2020 |
| 6 | "Hambre de gloria" | Nicolás Acuña | Paco Mateo | July 31, 2020 |
| 7 | "Semillas de traición" | Alejandro Bazzano | Paco Mateo | July 31, 2020 |
| 8 | "Hasta el fin del mundo" | Nicolás Acuña | Paco Mateo | July 31, 2020 |

== Production ==
Shooting locations included sites in Spain (La Calahorra, Cáceres, Trujillo), Peru (Ollantaytambo, Chinchero, Pisak) and Chile (Santiago, the Atacama Desert, the Araucania and Valdivia).

== Awards and nominations ==
| Year | Award | Category | Nominee(s) | Result | Ref. |
|---|---|---|---|---|---|
| 2021 | 8th MiM Series Awards | Best Miniseries | | Nominated | |
| 2021 | 23rd Festival des créations télévisuelles de Luchon | Audience Award for the Spanish selection | | Won | |
