= Alba (TV series) =

Tv series

- Genre: Drama
- Based on: Fatmagül'ün Suçu Ne?
- Directed by: Pablo Guerrero; Carlota Martínez-Pereda; Humberto Miró
- Country of origin: Spain
- Original language: Spanish
- No. of seasons: 1
- No. of episodes: 13

Production
- Executive producers: Pablo Guerrero; Montse García; Luis Santamaría
- Running time: 50 min (approx.)
- Production companies: Atresmedia; Boomerang TV

Original release
- Network: Atresplayer Premium
- Release: 28 March 2021 – June 20, 2021

Related
- Fatmagül'ün Suçu Ne?; Kya Qusoor Hai Amala Ka?

Alba is a Spanish drama television series produced by Atresmedia and Boomerang TV, consisting of an adaptation of the Turkish series Fatmagül'ün Suçu Ne?. It premiered on Atresplayer Premium on 28 March 2021.

== Premise ==
The series is set in the Marina Baixa. Alba, a student at the university in Madrid, is in a relationship there with Bruno, a young man from her hometown. One night, after returning to her hometown for the holidays, she is the victim of gang rape and wakes up on the beach in the morning with no memory of the event. Alba soon learns that the three male perpetrators are Bruno's best friends, and that Bruno was also on the scene during the crime. Seeking justice, Alba and Bruno must resist pressure and threats from the wealthy and powerful Entrerríos family.

== Cast ==
- Elena Rivera as Alba
- Eric Masip as Bruno Costa
- Álvaro Rico as Jacobo Entrerríos
- Adriana Ozores as Mercedes Entrerríos
- Pol Hermoso as Rubén Entrerríos
- Tito Valverde as Víctor Entrerríos
- Jason Fernández as Hugo Roig
- Beatriz Segura as Clara
- Ana Wagener
- Jorge Silvestre as Tirso
- Miquel Fernández
- Franky Martín as Toño
- Caterina Mengs as Bego
- Candela Cruz as Miriam
- Antonio Gil
- Jordi Ballester
- Luis Iglesia
- Mario Santos
- Pepa Gracia

== Production and release ==
Alba is an adaptation of the popular Turkish series Fatmagül'ün Suçu Ne?, known as Fatmagül in Spain. Coproduced by Atresmedia and Grupo Boomerang, it consists of 13 episodes with a running time of roughly 50 minutes. The scriptwriting team was formed by Irma Correa, Susana López, Javier Holgado, Carlos Vila, Ignasi Rubio and Carlos Martín. Filming began in June 2020. Shooting locations included the Madrid region, Villajoyosa and other cities in the Costa Blanca such as Benidorm and Finestrat. The 6-month-long filming wrapped by December 2020. Atresmedia set the date of the premiere for 28 March 2021. Netflix acquired the series in 2022 and released it on 15 July.
