= Juan Fernández Mejías =

Spanish actor

Juan Fernández
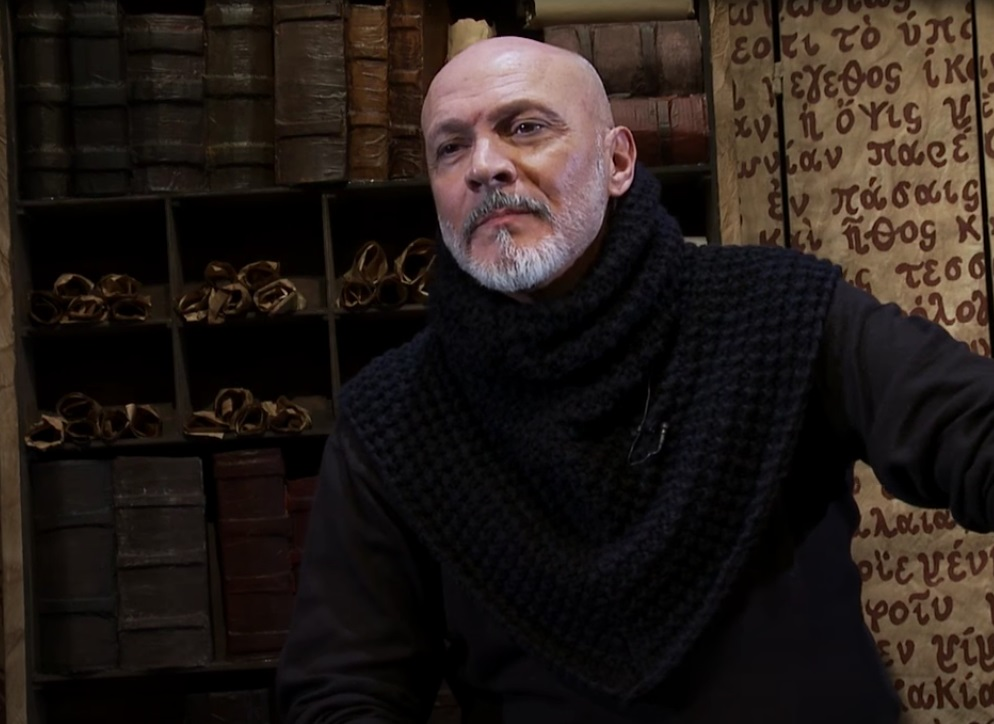
- (2014)
- Born: Juan Fernández Mejías; 1957 (age 68–69); Seville, Spain
- Occupations: Actor; character actor

Juan Fernández Mejías (born 1957), also known professionally simply as Juan Fernández, is a Spanish actor. While he has a decades-long career as stage actor, he is rather known to the public for supporting performances in film and television works.

== Biography ==
Born in 1957 in Seville.

He had his debut in a feature film with a performance as 'Juan' ("a burly truck driver") in Benito Zambrano's 1999 drama Solas, for which he earned the Actors Union Award for Best Film Performance in a Minor Role. Since then, his early filmography includes supporting appearances in feature films such as El corazón del guerrero (2000), Fausto 5.0 (2001), Lucía y el sexo (2001), El alquimista impaciente (2002), La caja 507 (2002), Hable con ella (2002), Atraco a las tres... y media (2003) and El refugio del mal (2003), whereas he also performed in guest roles in television series such as Periodistas, El comisario, Policías, Abogados, Raquel busca su sitio and Padre Coraje as well as the TV movies Jugar a matar and Diario de un skin.

Later in his career Fernández performed a recurring role in Los hombres de Paco (Tomás a.k.a. "Castresana") in 2007, and starred in the TV series Tierra de lobos, aired on Telecinco from 2010 to 2014, playing the authoritarian landlord Antonio Lobo, the main antagonist throughout the series. He performed another antagonist role in the first two parts of the popular series Money Heist, playing Colonel Prieto, the CNI representative seeking to liberate Alison Parker from the Royal Mint. In 2017, he joined the cast of Amar es para siempre to play Rodrigo Tuñón, a veteran of the Spanish civil war for the Rebel faction.

Fernández landed supporting roles in two 2020 historical drama television series, Inés del alma mía and El Cid, playing in both cases the grandfather of the lead character (Inés Suárez and Ruy Díaz).

== Filmography ==
Television

Year	Title	Role	Notes	Ref
2004	La sopa boba	Pedro		
2005–2006	7 días al desnudo	Gus Marina		
2007	Los hombres de Paco (Paco's Men)	Tomás, a.k.a. Castresana		
2007	R.I.S. Científica	Guillermo Cuevas (Ventura's mentor)		
2009	Los exitosos Pells	Franco Andrada		
2010–2013	Tierra de lobos	Antonio Lobo		
2015–2016	Víctor Ros	Comisario Buendía		
2017	El final del camino	Diego Peláez		
2017–2018	Amar es para siempre	Rodrigo Tuñón de Guevara		
2017–2020	La casa de papel (Money Heist)	Coronel Prieto		
2019	Lontano da te / Lejos de ti	Aníbal		
2020	Inés del alma mía (Inés of My Soul)	Don Alonso		
2020	El Cid	Rodrigo (Ruy's grandfather)		
2023	Memento mori	Comisario Mejía		
2024	El Marqués	Alejandro Perezagua		
