= El final del camino =

Spanish television series

- Genre: Adventure; Historical drama
- Screenplay by: Alberto Guntín; Xosé Morais; Víctor Sierra
- Directed by: Miguel Alcantud; Miguel Conde; Óscar Pedraza
- Starring: Antonio Velázquez; Javier Rey; Guillermo Barrientos
- Country of origin: Spain
- Original language: Spanish
- No. of seasons: 1
- No. of episodes: 8

Production
- Running time: 70 min (approx.)
- Production companies: RTVE; Voz Audiovisual

Original release
- Network: La 1 TVG
- Release: 11 January – 1 March 2017

El final del camino (lit. 'The Way's End') is an adventure television series set in 11th-and 12th-century Iberia, with the construction of the Santiago de Compostela Cathedral as backdrop. It aired in 2017 on La 1 and TVG.

== Premise ==
The fiction takes place between 1075 and 1120. It follows the mishaps of the three Catoira brothers, one of which (Pedro) is abducted by Muslims during a raid (aceifa) when he was a child. The other two (Gonzalo and Esteban) seek refuge in Santiago de Compostela where they are raised under the protection of Bishop Diego Peláez at the time of the construction of the Santiago de Compostela Cathedral.

== Cast ==
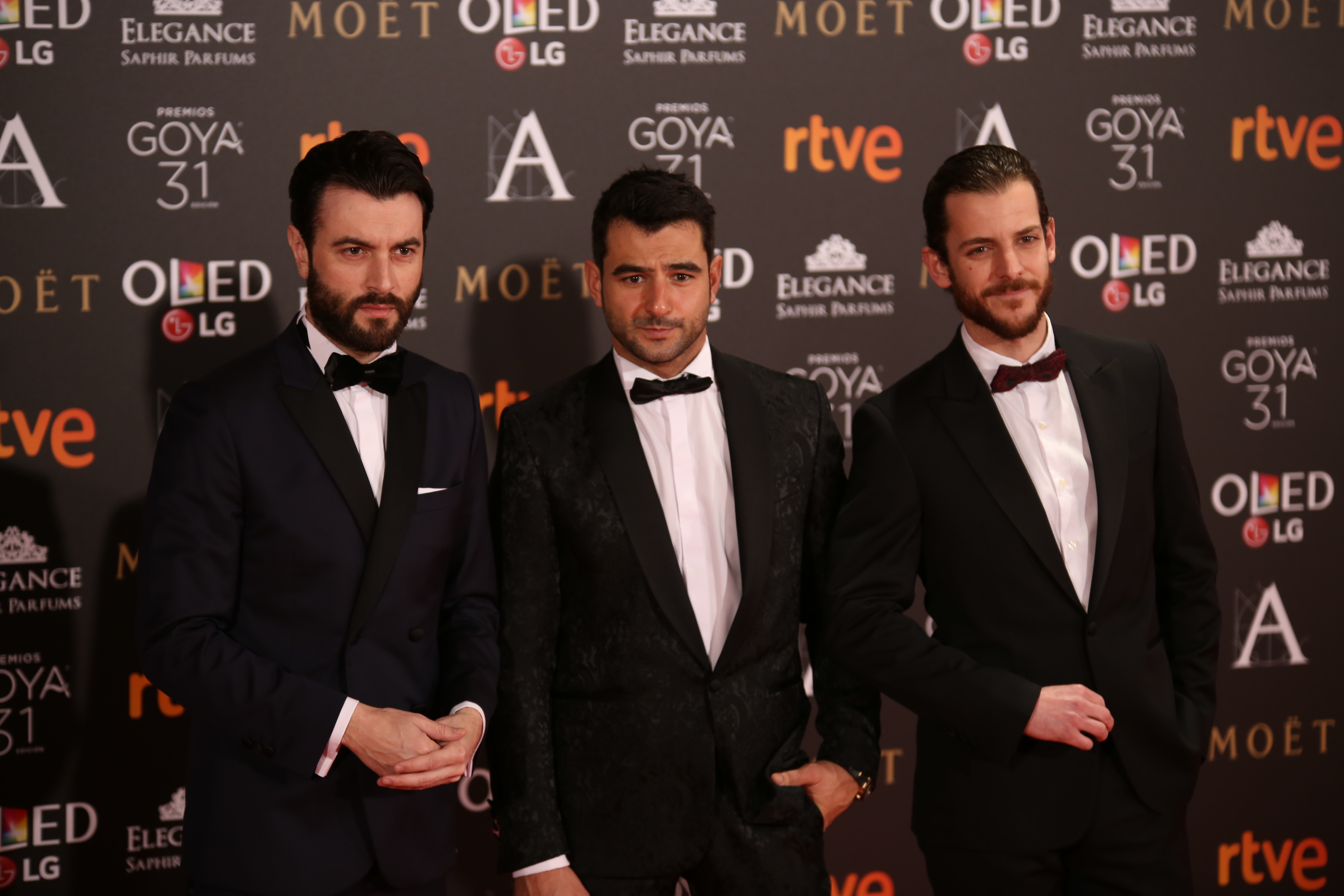
Javier Rey, Antonio Velázquez and Guillermo Barrientos, the actors playing the Catoira brothers

- Antonio Velázquez as Gonzalo de Catoira.
- Javier Rey as Pedro de Catoira.
- Guillermo Barrientos as Esteban de Catoira.
- Begoña Maestre as Elvira, Gonzalo's wife, working at a pilgrim's hospital.
- Ismael Martínez as Rodrigo de Limia, "Animal".
- Juan Fernández as Bishop Diego Peláez.
- Cristina Castaño as Constance of Burgundy.
- Asier Etxeandia as King Alfonso, the Brave.
- Patricia Peñalver as Urraca.
- Maxi Iglesias as King Alfonso, the Battler.
- Jaime Olías as Diego Gelmírez.
- Xabier Deive as Tomás.
- Tito Asorey as Simón.
- Manuel de Blas as Efraim, a Jewish physician, working at the pilgrim's hospital.
- Antonio Durán, "Morris" as Odamiro, the abbot of the Monastery of Antealtares.
- Juan Díaz as Raymond of Burgundy.
- Joan Massotkleiner as the Monk.
- Paco Manzanedo as Yusuf Ibn Tasufin.
- Abdelatif Hwidar as Nadir.
- Said El Mouden as Al-Mu Tamid.
- Inti El Meskine as Zaida.
- Fina Calleja as Jimena.
- Miguel Ángel Blanco as the King's Captain.
- Antonio Mourelos as Gelmiro.
- Déborah Vukusic as Naima.
- Manuel Regueiro as Conde Andrade.
- Héctor Carballo as Nuno.
- Fernando Morán as Maestro Bernardo.
- Carlos Villarino as Don García.

== Production and release ==
El final del camino was produced by RTVE and Voz Audiovisual. The screenplay was authored by Alberto Guntín, Xosé Morais and Víctor Sierra whereas the episodes were directed by Miguel Alcantud, Miguel Conde and Óscar Pedraza. Filming took place in Galicia, both for the Galician settings as well as for those settings in Toledo, Seville and Northern Africa. Shooting locations included a large set in Silleda, the forest of Saidres (Silleda), Escuadro, the pazo of Donfreán (Lalín), the brañas of Xextoso (Silleda), Patanín (A Estrada), the river beach of Cira (Silleda), and the Castle of San Felipe in Ferrol.

It consisted of 8 episodes with a running time of about 70 minutes. The first episode premiered on La 1 in prime time on 11 January 2017. The broadcasting run ended on 1 March 2017 with a 8.4% average audience share.

Series	Episodes	Originally released		Share (%)	Ref.
Series	Episodes	First released	Last released	Share (%)	Ref.
1	8	11 January 2017	1 March 2017	8.4	

No.	Title	Original release date
1	"Bienvenidos a Compostela"	11 January 2017
2	"Héroes anónimos"	18 January 2017
3	"Dos días"	25 January 2017
4	"Rebelión"	1 February 2017
5	"La libertad de los hombres"	8 February 2017
6	"Libertad"	15 February 2017
7	"El final de un futuro rey"	22 February 2017
8	"La catedral de Santiago"	1 March 2017
