= Trisha Fernández =

Spanish actress, model and television presenter (born 1994)

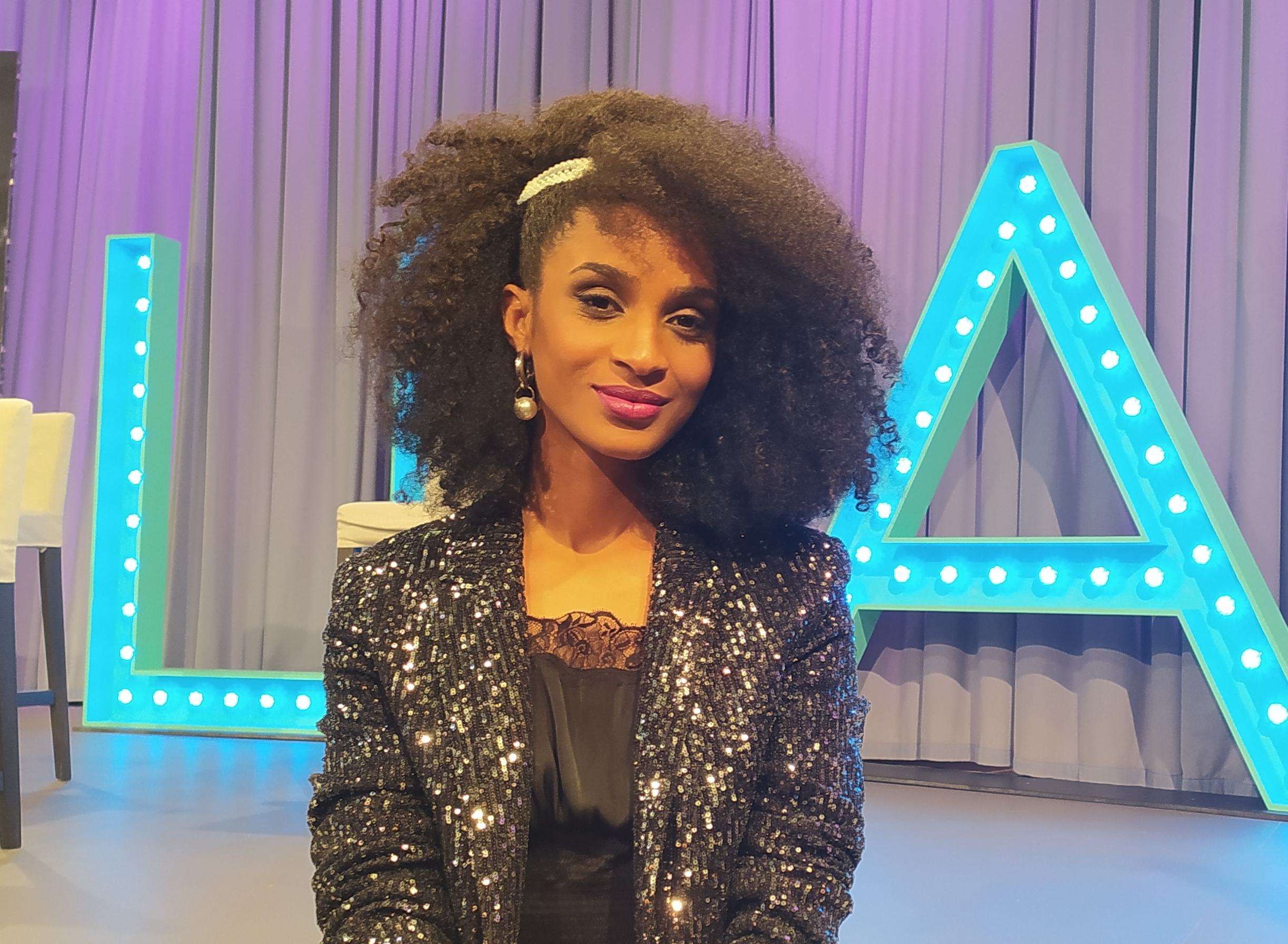
- Trisha Fernández in 2022
- Born: Trisha Fernández de Jesús; 19 November 1994 (age 31); Luanda, Angola
- Occupations: Actress, model and television presenter
- Years active: 2013–present

Trisha Fernández de Jesús (born 19 November 1994) is a Spanish actress, model and television presenter, best known for her role as Marcia Sampaio Álvez in the Spanish telenovela Acacias 38.

== Biography ==
Fernández was born in Luanda to a Spanish father of Galician descent and an Angolan mother. Her mother died when she was two years old. She moved with her father to Galicia where she was raised between the towns of Filguera, in the municipality of Crecente, and A Cañiza. After starting work as a model, as well as playing handball, she represented Galicia in Miss Spain in 2013.

She began her acting career in 2015, appearing in the short film Ocultos, directed by Carlos Cabrero. She would later star in many of his short films, including Aquelarre (where she stars as the protagonist), Chistes de amor, and Serás mi novia. She also appeared in his movies, such as Cuando florezca el cerezo and Encerrados. In 2018, she acted in Bernanda, directed by Emilio Ruiz Barrachina, interpreting the role of Angustias. In 2018 as well, she starred in the series Todo por el juego, playing Empleada Alquiler de Coches, and Fariña: Costa de Cocaína, playing Chica de la Piscina. She played Paloma in a 2019 remake of We're No Angels by Cabrero. That same year, she played the role of Saundra Wilkins in En el corredor de la muerte, as well as participating in Telepasión, broadcast by La 1.

She began her breakthrough role as Marcia Sampaio Álvez in season 5 of Acacias 38 in 2019, where she continued in that role until the death of the character. In 2020, she played Trish in No muertos, as well appearing in the televisiom program Luar, hosted by Xosé Ramón Gayoso. She had previously participated in other television programs such as Land Rover, Atrápame se podes and Comando G. In 2022, she participated in the Carlos Martín short film Quién, and later starred in the Javier Elorrieta film Delfines de plata.

== Filmography ==
=== Film ===
Year	Title	Role	Director
2018	Cuando florezca el cerezo	Patri	Carlos Cabero
2018	Bernarda	Angustias	Emilio Ruiz Barrachina
2019	We're No Angels	Paloma	Carlos Cabero
2021	Encerrados	Uno	Carlos Cabero
2022	Delfines de plata		Javier Elorrieta

=== TV series ===
Year	Title	Role	Notes
2018	Todo por el juego	Empleada Alquiler de Coches	
2018	Fariña: Costa de Cocaína	Chica piscina	
2019	En el corredor de la muerte	Saundra Wilkins	
2019–2020	Acacias 38	Marcia Sampaio Álvez	182 episodes
2020	No muertos	Trish	
2024	Skruk	Lucia	4 episodes

=== Short film ===
Year	Title	Role	Director
2015	Ocultos		Carlos Cabero
2016	Aquelarre		Carlos Cabero
2017	Chistes de amor	Elena	Carlos Cabero
2018	Serás mi novia	Ana	Carlos Cabero
2022	Quién	Camarera	Carlos Martín
