= Elena Rivera (actress) =

Spanish actress

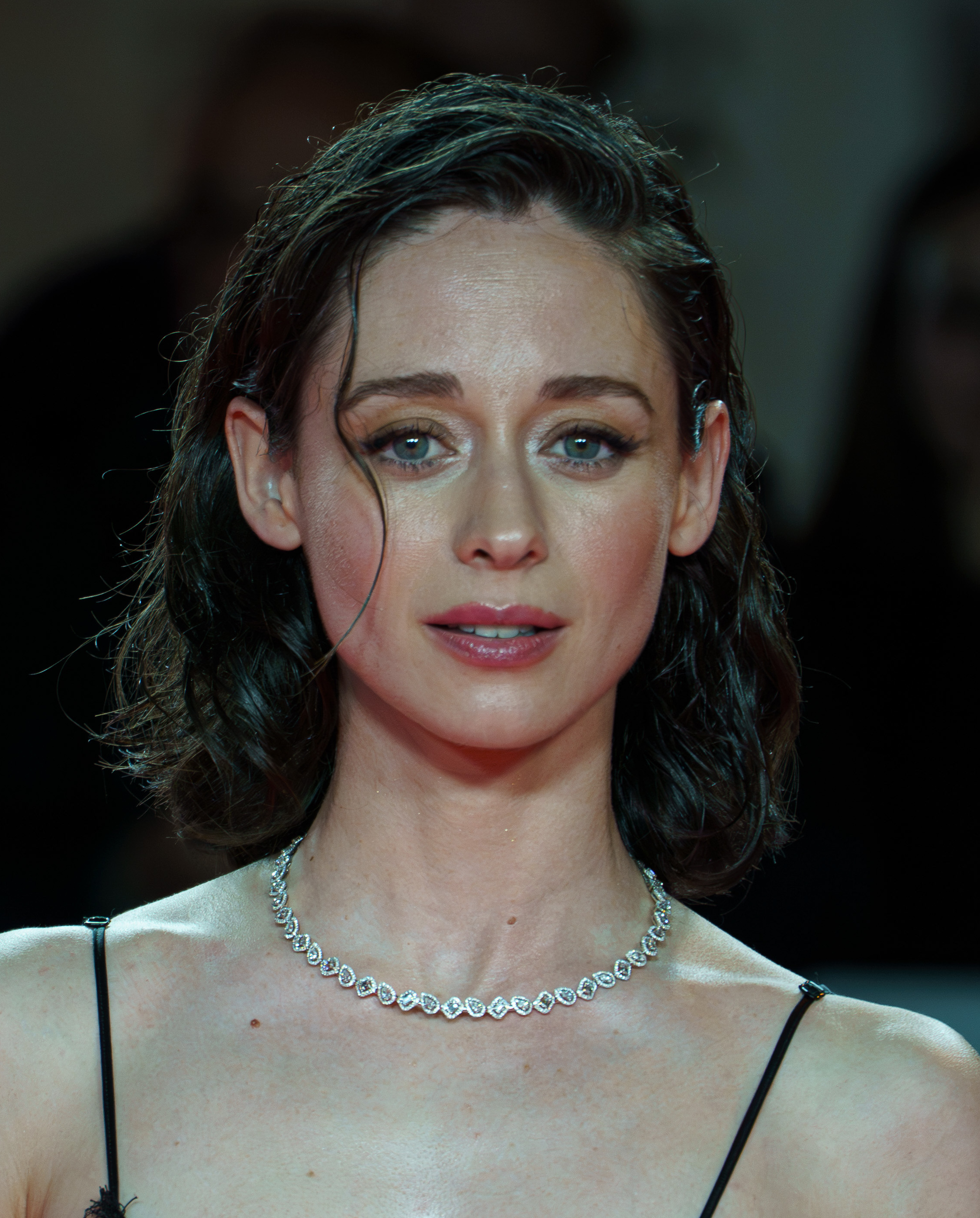
- Rivera in 2025
- Born: Elena Rivera Villajos; 29 August 1992 (age 33); Zaragoza, Aragon, Spain
- Occupations: Actress, singer

Elena Rivera Villajos (born 29 August 1992) is a Spanish actress. She became popular for her long-lasting role as Karina in Cuéntame cómo pasó.

== Biography ==
Elena Rivera Villajos was born in Zaragoza on 29 August 1992. She took part in the singing talent television show Menudas Estrellas when she was 6 years old, impersonating Paloma San Basilio and reaching the finals. She began to play Karina in Cuéntame cómo pasó in 2005, when she was 13 years old. She appeared in the TV series Los Quién (2011), Toledo, cruce de destinos (2012) and Servir y proteger (2017) and in the film Off Course (2015). After more than a decade in Cuéntame, Rivera left the series in 2018. She then finished her degree in child education and starred as Inés Suárez in the historical drama series Inés of My Soul (2020). She also featured as the lead in the Atresmedia limited series Alba and appeared in Heirs to the Land.

== Filmography ==
=== Television ===
Year	Title	Role	Notes	Ref.
2003–18	Cuéntame cómo pasó	Karina Saavedra		
2011	Los Quién	Chesca Gallego		
2012	Toledo, cruce de destinos	Beatriz de Suma Carrera		
2017	Servir y proteger	Elena Ruiz		
2017	El Ministerio del Tiempo	Margarita de Austria		
2018	La verdad	Paula García / Sara López		
2020	Inés del alma mía (Inés Of My Soul)	Inés Suárez		
2021	Alba	Alba		
2022	Sequía	Daniela Yanes		
2022	Los herederos de la tierra (Heirs to the Land)	Caterina Llor		
2025	Perdiendo el juicio	Amanda Torres		

=== Film ===
Year	Title	Role	Notes	Ref.
2015	Perdiendo el norte (Off Course)	Nuria		
2017	El dulce sabor del limón	Ilena		
