= Traición (TV series) =

Spanish drama television series produced by RTVE

- Genre: Family drama
- Created by: Ramón Campos; Gema R. Neira
- Directed by: Antonio Hernández; Lino Escalera
- Starring: Ana Belén; Pedro Alonso; Nathalie Poza; Manuela Velasco; Eloy Azorín; Antonio Velázquez; Carlos Bardem
- Country of origin: Spain
- Original language: Spanish
- No. of seasons: 1
- No. of episodes: 9

Production
- Production companies: RTVE; Bambú Producciones

Original release
- Network: La 1
- Release: 28 November 2017 – 30 January 2018

Traición (lit. 'Treason') is a Spanish drama television series produced by RTVE in collaboration with Bambú Producciones. It aired on La 1 from 2017 to 2018.

== Premise ==
Julio Fuentes (Helio Pedregal), the patriarch of the Fuentes family, has the clan gathered to announce that he is terminally ill. He also informs the family that he has an illegitimate child and that he has ordered the cancellation of plans to merge his law firm with an English firm. Then the family relations begin to fall apart.

== Cast ==
- Ana Belén as Pilar del Riego.
- Nathalie Poza as Almudena Fuentes.
- Pedro Alonso as Roberto Fuentes.
- Manuela Velasco as Isabel Fuentes.
- Natalia Rodríguez as Claudia Fuentes.
- Antonio Velázquez as Carlos Santos.
- Eloy Azorín as Rafael Sotomayor.
- Begoña Maestre as Beatriz Sánchez.
- Susana Córdoba as Miriam Márquez.
- Carlos Bardem as Julián Casas.
- Gaby del Castillo as Sergio Muñoz.
- Israel Elejalde as Víctor Ayala.
- Belén López as Manuela Pastor.
- Pepe Ocio as Jaime Maldonado.
- Raúl Mérida as David Padilla.

With the special collaboration of

- Helio Pedregal as Julio Fuentes.

== Production and release ==
Produced by RTVE in collaboration with Bambú Producciones, Traición is based on the original idea by Ramón Campos and Gema R. Neira, who co-authored the screenplay together with Daniel Martín Serrano, Curro Novallas, José Antonio Valverde and Fran Navarro. Antonio Hernández and Lino Escalera directed the episodes. The series was known as Código de familia during the pre-production phase. Filming started in August 2017. The first episode premiered on 28 November 2017. The broadcasting run ended on 30 January 2018.

| Series | Episodes | Originally released | | | Viewers | Share (%) | Ref. |
| Series | Episodes | First released | Last released | Network | Viewers | Share (%) | Ref. |
|---|---|---|---|---|---|---|---|
| 1 | 9 | 28 November 2017 | 30 January 2018 | tve | 2,038,000 | 12.2 | |

This is a caption
| No. in season | Title | Viewers | Original release date | Share (%) |
|---|---|---|---|---|
| 1 | "Una familia feliz" | 2,321,000 | 28 November 2017 | 13.7 |
| 2 | "No sé quién eres" | 2,042,000 | 5 December 2017 | 12.8 |
| 3 | "La verdad pública" | 2,088,000 | 12 January 2017 | 12.0 |
| 4 | "Padre nuestro" | 1,950,000 | 19 January 2017 | 11.6 |
| 5 | "Naturaleza muerta" | 1,993,000 | 29 December 2017 | 11.5 |
| 6 | "¿De qué lado estás?" | 1,961,000 | 9 January 2018 | 11.3 |
| 7 | "Si golpean a uno, golpean a todos" | 1,897,000 | 16 January 2018 | 11.4 |
| 8 | "180 segundos" | 1,943,000 | 23 January 2018 | 12.4 |
| 9 | "Una última verdad" | 2,054,000 | 30 January 2018 | 12.4 |
