= Begoña Maestre =

Spanish actress

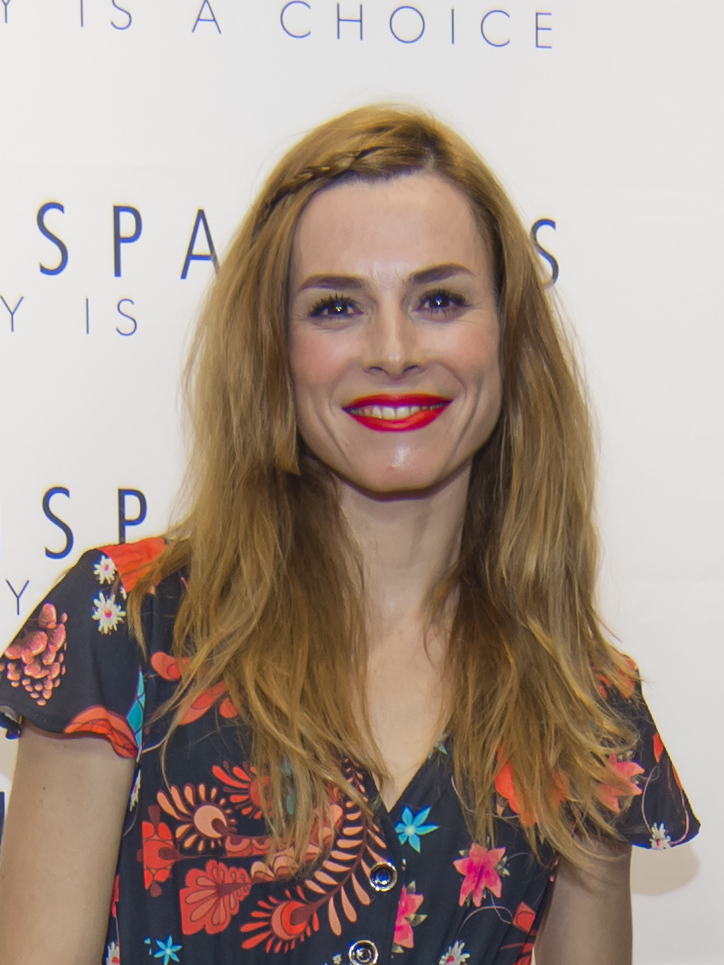
- Begoña Maestre in 2016
- Born: 1 August 1978 (age 48); Baracaldo, Vizcaya, Spain
- Occupation: Actress
- Years active: 2001-present

Begoña Maestre (Baracaldo, August 1, 1978) is a Spanish actress. She has worked in television, film and theater. She is known for her participation in the series Amar en tiempos revueltos and Hospital Central.

== Biography ==
Begoña has worked in theater, television and cinema. In the theater, she has portrayed characters in plays such as Cyrano de Bergerac, Mujeres frente al espejo, Ana en el trópico, Kyrie, el nuevo europeo or Schubert.

Her cinema debut was in 2003 with the short film Leni, by Luis García Gómez, in which Begoña played the main character, Leni. The following year, under the orders of Antonio Gárate, she shot the feature film Un año en la luna, in which she played the character of Esther, followed in 2006 by Alesio, directed by Gustavo Jiménez.

Other films in her filmography are Cuestión de química, by Juan Moya, or Soy el solitario, where she plays Silvia Pereira. In 2011 she worked in the film Arriya, by Alberto Gorritiberea. The last film in which she has participated was the film of director Benito Zambrano, in 201, La voz dormida, based on a novel by Dulce Chacón and dealing with Franco's repression during the post-war period.

She has appeared in television series including single appearances in Paco y Veva, Hospital Central and El comisario, appearing in 4 episodes in the latter.

She has also portrayed recurring characters in several series. In 2001 she worked in Ciudad-Sur, in the role of Isa, and also joined the series Compañeros, in which she was Duna Belarde. In 2004 she also worked in the thriller series Motivos personales, playing the character of Tania Acosta.

In 2006, she was hired to act in the soap opera Amar en tiempos revueltos, where she played the role of Carlota Domínguez, the mystical and puritanical sister of Elisa.

In 2009, she joined the cast of Hospital Central (where she had previously acted in a single episode), as the recurring character Raquel Castaño. In 2014 she joined the cast of Chiringuito de Pepe. Between 2019 and 2020 she was part of the series Mercado Central of TVE playing Celia Mendoza, a widowed and enterprising mother.

== Filmography ==
=== Television ===
Television series
Years	Title	Character	Channel	Episodes
2001–2002	Compañeros	Duna Belarde	Antena 3	26
2004	Paco y Veva	Novia	La 1	1
2004	El comisario	Carolina	Telecinco	4
2004	Hospital Central	Susana	Telecinco	1
2005	Motivos personales	Tania Acosta Nadal	Telecinco	27
2006–2007	Amar en tiempos revueltos	Carlota Domínguez	La 1	198
2008	Yo soy el Solitario	Silvia Pereira	Antena 3	2
2009–2012	Hospital Central	Dra. Raquel Castaño	Telecinco	56
2013	Con el culo al aire	Paula	Antena 3	5
2014	Sin identidad	Lucía	Antena 3	2
2014–2016	El chiringuito de Pepe	Laura Martín	Telecinco	26
2016	El Ministerio del Tiempo	Mujer	La 1	2
2016	Olmos y Robles	Alba Castro	La 1	2
2017	El final del camino	Elvira	La 1	8
2017	Traición	Beatriz "Bea" Sánchez	La 1	9
2019–2020	Mercado central	Celia Mendoza	La 1	240
2020	Patria	Aránzazu	HBO	2
2025–	Alpha Males	Virginia	Netflix	

=== Cinema ===
- Leni (2003), by Luis García Gómez (cortometraje). As Leni.
- Un año en la luna (2004), by Antonio Gárate. As Esther.
- Alesio (2006), by Gustavo Jiménez.
- Cuestión de química (2007) by Juan Moya.
- Soy el solitario (2008). As Silvia Pereira
- Arriya (2011) by Alberto Gorritiberea.
- La voz dormida (2011) by Benito Zambrano as Amalia.

=== Theater ===
- Schubert.
- Kyrie, el nuevo europeo.
- Ana en el trópico.
- Mujeres frente al espejo.
- Cyrano de Bergerac.
- La gata sobre el tejado de zinc (2017)
