= Alejandra Meco =

Spanish actress and dancer (born 1990)

- Born: Alejandra Meco Nahim; Madrid, Spain
- Occupations: Actress; dancer
- Years active: 2013–present
- Known for: Acacias 38 (2016–2017); El secreto de Puente Viejo (2018–2019)
- Website: Alejandra Meco

Alejandra Meco Nahim is a Spanish actress and dancer, known for playing the leading role of Teresa Sierra in the soap opera Acacias 38 and for that of Elsa Laguna in the soap opera El secreto de Puente Viejo.

== Biography ==
Born in 1990 in Madrid (Spain), Alejandra Meco studied classical dance at the conservatory in her hometown before attending university. She later decided to become an actress, so she took up acting studies. In addition to Spanish, she speaks fluent English, Italian, and French.

== Career ==
After living in Italy for a year, she returned to her hometown, where she began to gain recognition as a television actress. In 2013, she played Sara Alonso in the short film Juegos de verano directed by Agustín Montero and Luis Riesco. In 2014, she starred in the series Aída and in the short film Anillo de Amantes, directed by Javier Figuero. In 2015, she starred in the series El Caso. Crónica de sucesos (as Daughter of Garcés) and in Relájate y Goza (as Novia de Américo). The following year, in 2016, she participated in the television program Telepasión española, broadcast on La 1.

In 2016 and 2017, she was cast as Teresa Sierra in the La 1 soap opera Acacias 38, alongside actors Gonzalo Trujillo, Sara Miquel, Marc Parejo and Inés Aldea. In 2018, she played the role of Martina in the short film Desire or Desiré para los incultos, directed by Franco Audrines. That same year, she starred in the films Desire directed by Carlo Felice Audrines, and De perdidos al Río directed by Patricia Medina.

In 2018 and 2019, she was cast as Elsa Laguna in the Antena 3 soap opera El secreto de Puente Viejo, alongside actors Ibrahim Al Shami, María Lima, Iván Montes, Paula Ballesteros and Trinidad Iglesias.

In 2019, she played the role of Laura in the short film #pornovenganza directed by Ignacio López. The following year, in 2020, she played the role of Lucía Soto in the short film The Aboves and the Belows directed by Alejandro Marcos. That same year, she starred in the film Déjate llevar. In 2022, she starred in the film Venus directed by Jaume Balagueró and in the short films The Only Family and A Shame, both directed by Matthew Winters. In 2024 she played the role of Zoe Castañar in the series Muertos S.L. and that of Elena Barco in the series Sueños de libertad.

== Filmography ==
=== Film ===
Year	Title	Role	Director
2018	Desire		Carlo Felice Audrines
2018	De perdidos al Río		Patricia Medina
2020	The aboves and the bellows		Alejandro Marcos
2021	Déjate llevar		K. Shaker
2022	Venus	Nina	Jaume Balagueró

=== HTV series ===
Year	Title	Role	Notes
2014	Aída		
2015	Relájate y Goza	Novia de Américo	2 episodes
2016	El Caso. Crónica de sucesos	Daughter of Garcés	1 episode
2016–2017	Acacias 38	Teresa Sierra	346 episodes
2018–2019	El secreto de Puente Viejo	Elsa Laguna	282 episodes
2024	Muertos S.L.	Zoe Castañar	1 episode
2024	Sueños de libertad	Elena Barco	70 episodes
2025	La encrucijada	Nuria	1 episodio
2026	Lidia Poet	Consuelo	6 episodios

=== Short films ===
Year	Title	Role	Director
2013	Juegos de verano	Américo's girlfriend	Agustín Montero and Luis Riesco
2014	Anillo de Amantes		Javier Figuero
2018	Desire o Desiré para los incultos	Martina	Franco Audrines
2019	#pornovenganza		Ignacio López
2020	The Aboves and the Belows	Lucia Soto	Alejandro Marcos
2022	The Only Family		Matthew Winters
2022	A Shame		Matthew Winters

== Theater ==
Year	Title	Author	Director
2012	Dos Mujeres	Javier Dualte	Eduardo Recabarren
2012	El tartufo	Molière	Eduardo Recabarren
2013	La Casa de Bernarda Alba	Federico García Lorca	Eduardo Recabarren
2013	Lo bueno de las lores es que se marchitan pronto	José Sanchís Sinisterra	Eduardo Recabarren
2014	Cómo gustéis	William Shakespeare	Lorena Bayonas
2015	Batas Blancas		Eduardo Recabarren and Aintzane Garreta
2020	Negro		Ricardo Campelo Paravides

== Television programs ==
Year	Title	Channel
2016	Telepasión española	La 1

== Awards ==
Year	Award	Category	Result
2020	Hollywood Blood Film Festival	Best Supporting Actress	Won
