= Killing Time (2015 film) =

- Theatrical release poster
- Spanish: Matar el tiempo
- Directed by: Antonio Hernández
- Screenplay by: Antonio Hernández
- Produced by: Beatriz Bodegas; Ramiro Acero
- Starring: Ben Temple; Yon González; Aitor Luna; Esther Méndez
- Cinematography: Javier Salmones
- Edited by: Lucas Noya
- Music by: Antonio Galeano; Luis Ivars
- Production companies: Matar el tiempo AIE; La Canica Films; Kaliu y Laberinto; Mecomlys
- Distributed by: World Line Cinema
- Release dates: 19 April 2015 (Málaga); 29 May 2015 (Spain)
- Country: Spain
- Languages: Spanish; English

Killing Time (Spanish: Matar el tiempo) is a 2015 Spanish techno-thriller film written and directed by Antonio Hernández which stars Ben Temple alongside Esther Méndez, Yon González, and Aitor Luna.

== Plot ==
During an online meeting with alluring prostitute Sara via webcam, American businessman Robert H. Walton is witness to the break-in of two extorters working for an organ trade ring into the escort's apartment, forcing him to choose whether to risk his life or not.

== Cast ==
- Ben Temple as Robert H. Walton
- Esther Méndez as Sara
- Yon González as Boris
- Aitor Luna as Diego
- Frank Feys as Nicholas
- Luisa Martín

== Production ==
The film was produced by Matar el tiempo AIE, La canica Films, Kaliu y Laberinto and Mecomlys. It was shot with Spanish- and English-language dialogue.

== Release ==
The film screened at the Málaga Film Festival on 19 April 2015. Distributed by World Line Cinema, it was released theatrically in Spain on 29 May 2015.

== Reception ==
Jonathan Holland of The Hollywood Reporter deemed the film to be "a smart contemporary item" [...] with "a busy, crumpled central performance by Ben Temple that goes a long way to making up for its defects".

Mirito Torreiro of Fotogramas rated the film 3 out of 5 stars, highlighting an "efficient" Temple as the best thing about the film while negatively citing how much credulity the film demands from the viewer.

== Accolades ==
Year	Award	Category	Nominee(s)	Result	Ref.
2016	30th Goya Awards	Best Original Song	"Cómo me mata el tiempo" by Luis Ivars	Nominated	

== See also ==
- List of Spanish films of 2015
