= José Pastor (actor) =

Spanish actor, musician, dancer and model

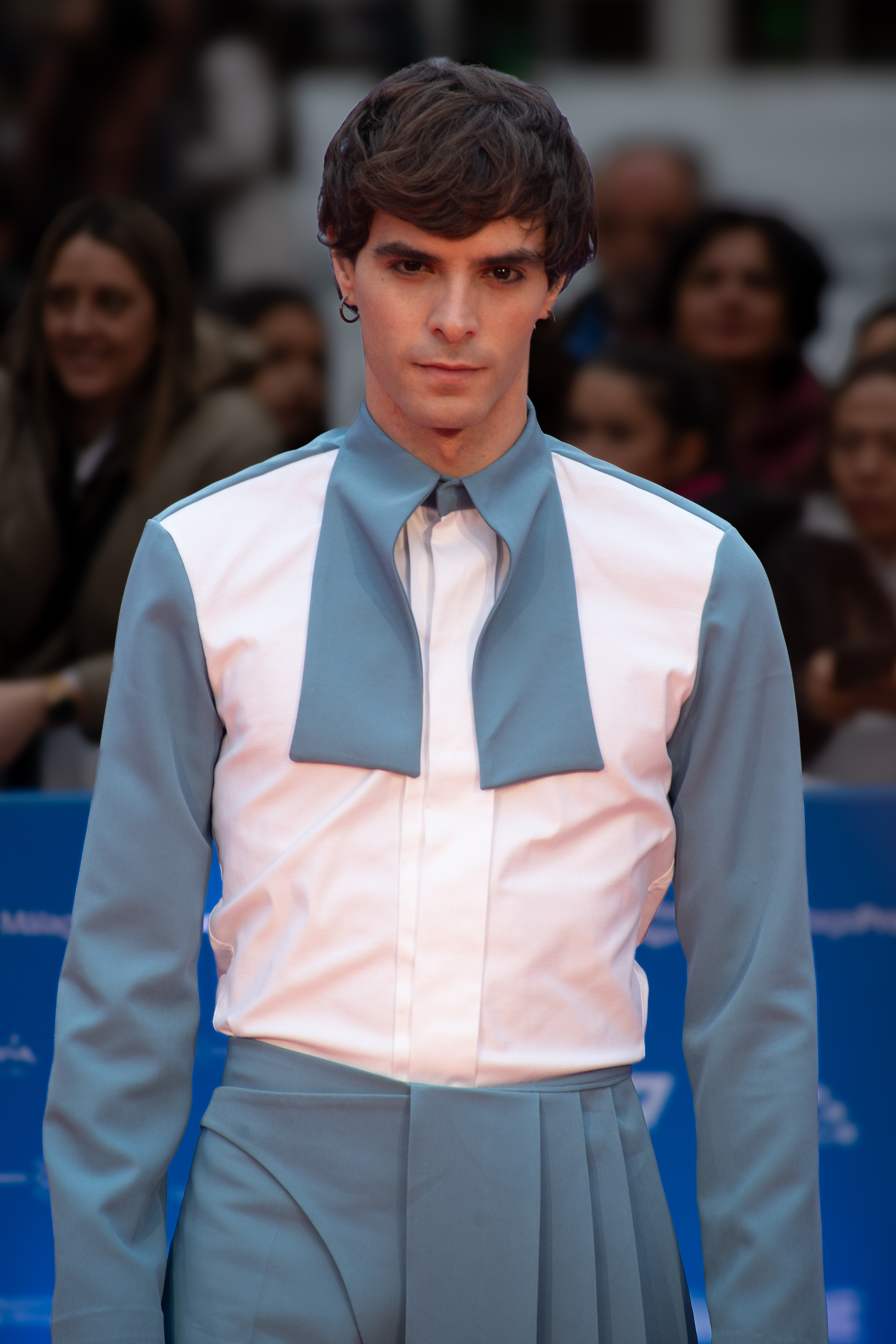
- Pastor in 2024
- Born: José Pastor Gómez; 7 February 1996 (age 30); Málaga, Andalusia, Spain
- Occupations: Actor; dancer

José Pastor Gómez (born 7 February 1996) is a Spanish actor and dancer.

== Life and career ==
José Pastor Gómez was born in Málaga on 7 February 1996. He studied at the Higher School for Dramatic Art (ESAD) of Málaga, before moving to Madrid to continue his formation. Trained as an actor, dancer, and singer, Pastor appeared in musicals such as La bella y la bestia and Chicago and television series such as A Different View, Hospital Valle Norte, and Acacias 38 in his career beginnings.

Pastor made his feature film debut in Al óleo (2019), followed by Piggy (2022). He landed his first leading television role in biographical miniseries Bosé (2022), in which he portrayed a young Miguel Bosé. His work in the series earned him a nomination for the Actors and Actresses Union Award for Best Television Actor in a Leading Role. In 2024, he starred as a young journalist opposite to Víctor Clavijo in the crime miniseries El Marqués and appeared in the teen drama series Raising Voices.

== Filmography ==
=== Television ===
Year	Title	Role	Channel	Notes
2018–19	A Different View	Rafael "Rafita" Peralta García de Blas	La 1	12 episodes
2019	Hospital Valle Norte	Guille	La 1	1 episode
2019–21	Acacias 38	Emilio Pasamar Fonseca	La 1	272 episodes
2021	The Vineyard	Gustavo Zayas	Amazon Prime Video	1 episode
2022	Bosé	Miguel Bosé	SkyShowtime / Telecinco	5 episodes
2023	De Madrid al suelo	Íñigo	YouTube	1 episode
2023–25	Valeria	Rai	Netflix	14 episodes
2024–26	El Marqués	Onofre Romera Pascual	Telecinco / Mediaset Infinity	12 episodes
2024	Raising Voices	David	Netflix	8 episodes
2026	Between Lands	Bosco	Atresplayer / Antena 3	10 episodes
2027	Hope's Corner	Darío	La 1	

=== Film ===
Year	Title	Role	Director	Notes
2019	Al óleo	Hugo	Pablo Lavado	
2022	Piggy	Pedro	Carlota Pereda	
2022	La Latina	Francisco	Jaime Gómez	Short film
2023	Blanco/ ROTO	Brother	Sandro Guerrero	Short film
2025	La tregua	Artigas	Miguel Ángel Vivas	
2026	La conexión intergaláctica	Pedro	Alberto Ortega	Short film
