= Hermanos (TV series) =

- Promotional poster
- Genre: Drama
- Directed by: Salvador Calvo; Joaquín Llamas
- Starring: María Valverde; Antonio Velázquez; Álvaro Cervantes
- Country of origin: Spain
- Original language: Spanish
- No. of seasons: 1
- No. of episodes: 6

Production
- Production companies: Mediaset España; Multipark Ficción

Original release
- Network: Telecinco
- Release: 16 September – 21 October 2014

Hermanos is a Spanish drama television series. Produced by Mediaset España in collaboration with Multipark Ficción, the 6-episode series aired on Telecinco from September to October 2014. Starring Antonio Velázquez, Álvaro Cervantes and María Valverde, the series—a generational story set in the 1980s and the 1990s— tracks the lives of three childhood friends.

== Plot ==
Starting in the mid 1980s in a working-class neighborhood of Madrid, two brothers—Juan (Antonio Velázquez) and Alberto (Álvaro Cervantes)—are in love with the same girl, their friend Virginia (María Valverde). Life takes each character to a singular path: the older brother, the brash Juan, puts aside his childhood dream of becoming a boxer and leaves Madrid for the shipyards of Vigo, becoming a trade union leader. Meanwhile, Alberto becomes a priced businessman, whereas Virginia attains her childhood goal of becoming a renowned journalist, entering the elite cultural circles, while also becoming a mother.

The friendship story (and love triangle) between the three characters intertwines with historical events such as the deindustrialization policies undertaken in Spain, the Balkan Wars, the rise of trade unionism or the so-called Movida madrileña.

== Cast ==
- Antonio Velázquez as Juan Torres.
- Álvaro Cervantes as Alberto Torres.
- María Valverde as Virginia Rodríguez.
- Carlos Hipólito as Antonio Torres.
- Sonia Almarcha as Jimena Olmedo.
- Elvira Mínguez as Julia Rodríguez.
- Aura Garrido as Pilar Yagüe.
- Fernando Cayo as Alfonso Yagüe.
- Irene Montalá as Esther Blanco.
- Ben Temple as Henry Sinclair.
- Carla Díaz as Marta.
- Víctor Clavijo as Damián Jurado.
- Roberto Álamo as Xabi Andrade.
- Daniel Grao as Víctor.
- Javier Godino as José Luis Salcedo.
- Miquel Fernández as Anxo Castro.

== Production and release ==
The series was entirely shot in Madrid (and the wider Madrid region), Guadalajara and Vigo (primarily location shots of the port and the shipyards). A substantial part of the urban outdoor scenes portraying Madrid were shot in the residential area of Fuerte de San Francisco in Guadalajara, whose architecture preserves the aesthetics of the 1980s. Guadalajara also served as set to recreate the shipyards of Vigo as well as the city of Sarajevo.

Salvador Calvo directed episodes 1, 2, 5 and 6, while Joaquín Llamas directed episodes 3 and 4.

The miniseries premiered on 16 September 2014 on Telecinco. Broadcast every Tuesday night in prime time, the last episode aired on 21 October 2014.

Starting with "promising" audience scores in the opening episode (2,615,000 viewers; 15.9% share) the series attracted a relatively stable audience during the first 5 episodes. However, the viewership took a substantial dip in the finale, down to a 9.1% share, challenged by the nudist reality show Adán y Eva aired on the sister channel Cuatro and the return of Velvet on Antena 3.

Series	Episodes	Originally released			Viewers	Share (%)	Ref.
Series	Episodes	First released	Last released	Network	Viewers	Share (%)	Ref.
1	6	16 September 2014	21 October 2014	Telecinco	2,222,000	13.5	

This is a caption
No. in season	Title	Directed by	Viewers	Original release date	Share (%)
1	"La huida"	Salvador Calvo	2,615,000	16 September 2014	15.9
2	"El reencuentro"	Salvador Calvo	2,274,000	23 September 2014	13.6
3	"El amor perdurará"	Joaquín Llamas	2,262,000	30 September 2014	14.0
4	"Crisis matrimonial"	Joaquín Llamas	2,329,000	7 October 2014	14.5
5	"El romance secreto"	Salvador Calvo	2,110,000	14 October 2014	14.0
6	"La verdad se abre paso"	Salvador Calvo	1,741,000	21 October 2014	9.1

== Accolades ==
Year	Award	Category	Nominees	Result	Ref.
2015	24th Actors and Actresses Union Awards	Best Television Actor in a Minor Role	Carlos Hipólito	Won	
2015	3rd MiM Series Awards	Best Miniseries or TV Movie		Nominated	
