= Toledo, cruce de destinos =

- Genre: Historical drama
- Created by: Emilio Díez
- Screenplay by: Emilio Díez; Alberto Úcar
- Composer: Álex Conrado
- Country of origin: Spain
- Original language: Spanish
- No. of seasons: 1
- No. of episodes: 13

Production
- Production company: Boomerang TV

Original release
- Network: Antena 3
- Release: 10 January – 3 April 2012

Toledo, cruce de destinos, or simply Toledo, is a Spanish historical drama television series, set in 13th-century Toledo. It aired on Antena 3 in 2012.

== Premise ==
The fiction follows the intrigues in the court of Alfonso X the Wise in late 13th-century Toledo as well as it attempts to depict the historical postulate about the so-called "Convivencia of the Three Cultures".

== Cast ==
- Juan Diego as King Alfonso, the Wise.
- Patricia Vico as Violante, Alfonso's queen consort.
- Maxi Iglesias as Martín Pérez de Ayala, Rodrigo Pérez de Ayala's son.
- Eduard Farelo as Rodrigo Pérez de Ayala.
- Fernando Cayo as the Count of Miranda.
- Rubén Ochandiano as Archbishop Oliva.
- Jaime Olías as Fernando.
- Miguel Barberá as Sancho, first born son of King Alfonso.
- Álex Angulo as Abraham, a Jewish merchant.
- Paula Rego as Fátima, Taliq.
- Paula Cancio as Diana, queen's first lady.
- Beatriz Vallhonrat as Blanca, Rodrigo Pérez de Ayala's daughter.
- Adrián Expósito as Cristóbal, Martín's friend.
- Daniel Holguín as Abu Bark, a Muslim warrior.
- Mario Vedoya as Taliq, leader of the Muslim community in Toledo.
- Petra Martínez as Elvira, a servant working for Rodrigo Pérez de Ayala, Cristóbal's mother.
- Elena Rivera as Beatriz de Suma Carrera.
- Carlos Serrano as Humberto Miranda, only son of the Count of Miranda.

== Production and release ==
Toledo, cruce de destinos was created by Emilio Díez. The screenplay was authored by Díez together with Alberto Úcar. Álex Conrado composed the musical score. Most of the series was shot in Pedraza, the Castle of Guadamur and the Antena 3 sets in Madrid, whereas the only real shots in the city of Toledo consisted of the outdoor shots of the Puente de Alcántara. Produced by Boomerang TV for Antena 3, the first episode premiered on 10 January 2012. The broadcasting run ended on 3 April 2012. While the average viewer figures for the season (13.5% audience share) ended up being slightly above the channel's average, the series was not renovated for a second season.

| Series | Episodes | Originally released | | | Viewers | Share (%) | Ref. |
| Series | Episodes | First released | Last released | Network | Viewers | Share (%) | Ref. |
|---|---|---|---|---|---|---|---|
| 1 | 13 | 10 January 2012 | 3 April 2012 | Antena 3 | 2,475,846 | 13.5 | |

This is a caption
| No. in season | Title | Viewers | Original release date | Share (%) |
|---|---|---|---|---|
| 1 | "El regreso" | 3,541,000 | 10 January 2012 | 19.7 |
| 2 | "El pacto" | 3,102,000 | 17 January 2012 | 16.5 |
| 3 | "Cruce de destinos" | 2,524,000 | 24 January 2012 | 13.3 |
| 4 | "Pacto de mentiras" | 2,442,000 | 31 January 2012 | 13.6 |
| 5 | "El destino" | 2,449,000 | 7 February 2012 | 13.6 |
| 6 | "El fuego de San Antonio" | 2,430,000 | 14 February 2012 | 13.1 |
| 7 | "Aquitania" | 2,287,000 | 21 February 2012 | 12.6 |
| 8 | "Tormenta de estrellas" | 2,161,000 | 28 February 2012 | 11.8 |
| 9 | "Traición" | 2,335,000 | 6 March 2012 | 12.8 |
| 10 | "El último templario" | 2,368,000 | 13 March 2012 | 13.2 |
| 11 | "La culpa" | 2,196,000 | 20 March 2012 | 12.1 |
| 12 | "Redención" | 2,267,000 | 27 March 2012 | 12.0 |
| 13 | "La última batalla" | 2,084,000 | 3 April 2012 | 11.1 |

== Critical reception ==
The historical depiction of Toledo was bashed by historians, while former mayor of Toledo Juan Ignacio de Mesa wrote in a column he felt "embarrassed" after watching a few episodes. In addition, critics also pointed out the "gratuitous" switch of the characters of Sancho and Fernando, when Fernando was the heir-apparent instead of the younger infante, as well as the condition of bastard of Sancho, and other historical anachronisms (loose hair instead of hair up for most women, the horizontal companionship between an heir apparent and his servants, errors in the representation of medieval women, Jews not abiding to kosher, soldiers "in uniform" or anachronical swords, to name a few).
