= Sequía =

Spanish–Portuguese television series

- Spanish: Sequía
- Portuguese: Crimes Submersos
- Genre: Thriller
- Screenplay by: Arturo Ruiz; Daniel Corpas
- Directed by: Joaquín Llamas; Oriol Ferrer
- Starring: Elena Rivera; Marco d'Almeida; Guilherme Filipe; Miryam Gallego; Rodolfo Sancho
- Countries of origin: Spain; Portugal
- Original languages: Spanish; Portuguese
- No. of seasons: 1
- No. of episodes: 8

Production
- Production locations: Madrid region, Province of Cáceres, Lisbon region, Leiria
- Production companies: RTVE; RTP; Atlantia Media; Coral Europa

Original release
- Release: 18 January 2022

Sequía (lit. 'Drought'), as known in Spain, or Crimes Submersos (lit. 'Underwater Crimes') in Portugal, is a Spanish–Portuguese thriller television series which stars Elena Rivera, Marco d'Almeida, Guilherme Filipe, Miryam Gallego and Rodolfo Sancho, among others. It is produced by Radiotelevisión Española (RTVE) and Rádio e Televisão de Portugal (RTP) in collaboration with Atlantia Media and Coral Europa. It premiered on La 1 and RTVE Play on 18 January 2022 and on RTP1 on 21 January 2022.

== Premise ==
The plot starts with the discovery of two skeletons at the bottom of a water reservoir as the ongoing event of severe drought has led to the unflooding of the drowned village of Campomediano. Police inspector Daniela Yanes takes over the case. The plot gets to involve two families living at different sides of the border between Portugal and Spain.

== Cast ==
- Elena Rivera as Daniela Yanes
- Marco d'Almeida as Helder, of the Polícia Judiciária
- Guilherme Filipe as Luis Barbosa, president of the hydroelectric company
- Miryam Gallego as Paula, Luis Barbosa's daughter and Martin's wife
- Rodolfo Sancho as Martín Ruiz
- Miguel Ángel Muñoz as journalist Óscar Santos
- Juan Gea
- Soraia Chaves
- Margarida Marinho
- Fernando Andina
- Nacho Nugo as Rubén, grandson of Luis Barbosa
- Paula Lobo Antunes
- Rita Loureiro
- Fanny Gautier

== Production and release ==
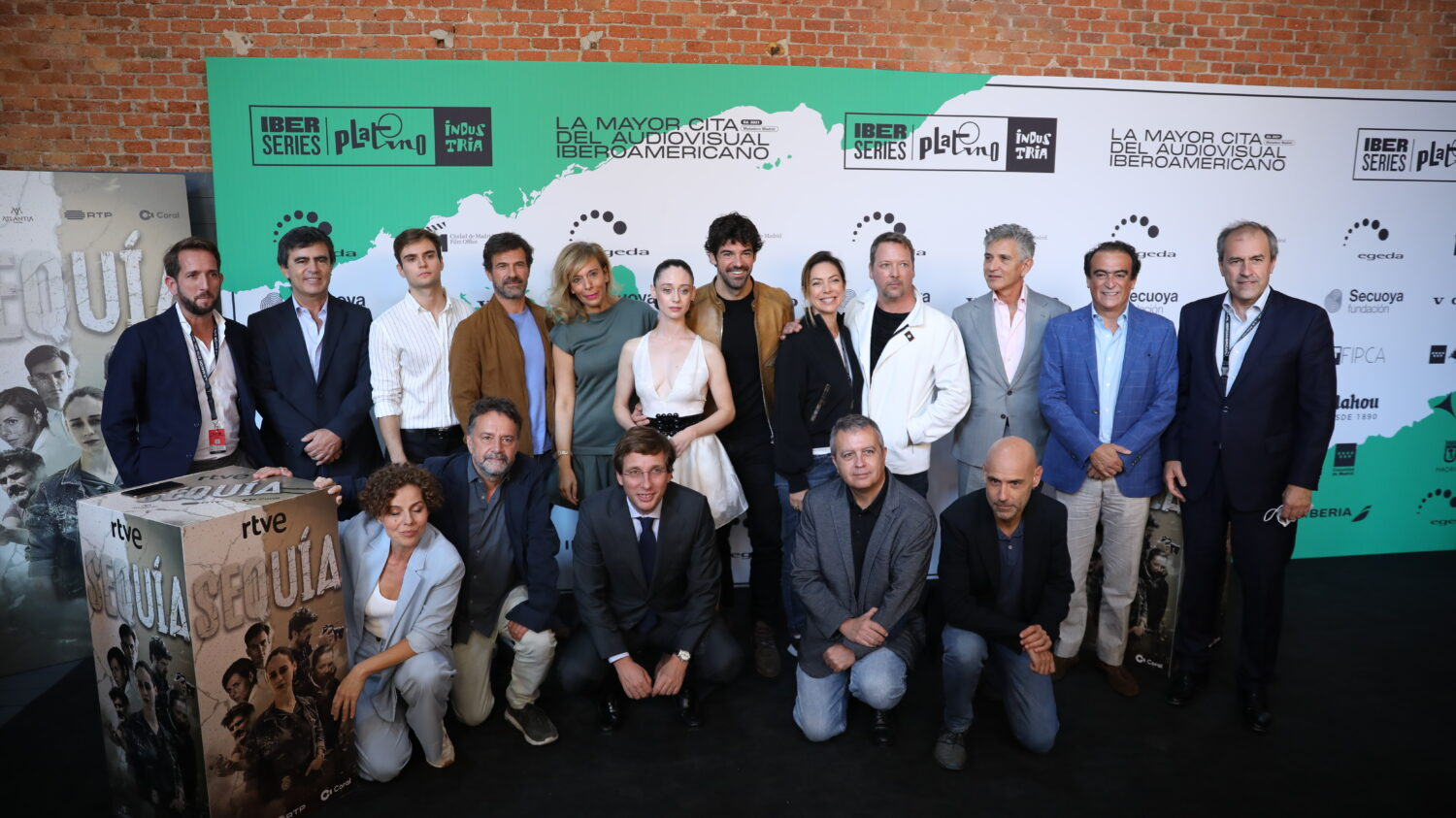
Presentation of the series at the IberSeries Platino Industria Festival on 30 September 2021.

Produced by Spanish and Portuguese public broadcasters RTVE and RTP in collaboration with Atlantia Media and Coral Europa, the series was written by Arturo Ruiz and Daniel Corpas whereas the direction was tasked to Joaquín Llamas and Oriol Ferrer. Director Joaquín Llamas described the series as a "thriller mixed with a 'family noir'". José de Castro was responsible for the score. Shooting began in the Madrid region in June 2021. The crew later moved to Cáceres, Extremadura. Filming locations in Cáceres included the old town, the sanctuary of Virgen de la Montaña, the area near the Palacio de Justicia and the old mining neighborhood of Aldea Moret. Production in Cáceres ended in late July and then moved to the Lisbon region. Production also worked in Leiria. Originally intended to consist of six 70-minute-long episodes, it was restructured to fit a format of 8 episodes of around 60 minutes.

The series was pre-screened at the "IberSeries Platino Industria" Festival on 30 September 2021.
