= RIS Científica =

- Genre: Crime drama
- Created by: Salvador Calvo
- Starring: José Coronado; Irene Montalà; Ismael Martínez; Belén López; Carlos Leal; Pedro Casablanc; Juan Fernández
- Country of origin: Spain
- Original language: Spanish
- No. of seasons: 1
- No. of episodes: 13 (list of episodes)

Production
- Production location: Madrid,
- Running time: 50'

Original release
- Network: Telecinco
- Release: September 23 – December 18, 2007

RIS Científica is a television series co-produced by Videomedia and the Spanish network Telecinco and released by the latter. It is an adaptation of the Italian series RIS Delitti Imperfetti in turn inspired by the American production CSI.

It premiered on September 23, 2007. The first two episodes were broadcast in prime time on Sunday, with a lower than average audience share, so from October 9 it was moved to Tuesday at 22: 00. On December 18, the last episode was screened, with no announcement of a second season.

== Plot summary ==
The series follows the team of forensic experts in Spain who are trying to solve crimes with the help of forensic evidence. The location of the series is Madrid. This is the first series in the RIS franchise that has been cancelled.

== Cast ==
- Ricardo Ventura (José Coronado) is the new head of the special unit of the scientific police, after replacing Cuevas.
- Ana Galeano (Irene Montalà) is the computer expert, newly incorporated into the unit.
- David Conde (Ismael Martínez), is a ballistics unit expert.
- Claudia Barrea (Belén López) is from the medical examiner Unit. She maintains a non-committal relationship with Ventura.
- Martín Orce (Carlos Leal), is the chemistry and biology specialist.
- Damián Bermejo (Pedro Casablanc) is a veteran police interrogation expert.
- Guillermo Cuevas (Juan Fernández) is the creator of this special police unit. After twenty years as its head, his superiors compel him to retire early because of a degenerative disease, a fact that will point to a dark side to his character.

== See also ==
- R.I.S, police scientifique, the French remake
- R. I. S. – Die Sprache der Toten, the German remake
