= El Marqués (TV series) =

- Promotional poster
- Genre: Crime; Period drama
- Created by: Ignacio del Moral; Begoña Álvarez
- Directed by: Begoña Álvarez; José Ramón Ayerra
- Starring: Víctor Clavijo; José Pastor; Cinta Ramírez; Lara Grube; Paco Tous; Laura Baena Torres; Óscar de la Fuente; Juan Fernández; Joaquín Núñez
- Country of origin: Spain
- Original language: Spanish
- No. of seasons: 1
- No. of episodes: 6

Production
- Production companies: Mediaset España; Unicorn Content

Original release
- Network: Telecinco
- Release: 22 May – 26 June 2024

El Marqués is a Spanish crime drama limited television series created by Ignacio del Moral and Begoña Álvarez inspired by the 1975 Crime of Los Galindos. It stars Víctor Clavijo and José Pastor. It originally aired on Telecinco from 22 May to 26 June 2024.

== Plot ==
Set in Spain, the plot is split in two different timelines in 1975 and 1977. Young journalist Onofre returns to his hometown in 1977 to write a report about the multiple murder that took place in 1975, going on to clash with the Marquis.

== Cast ==
- Víctor Clavijo as Rafael Pertierra de Medina, Marquis of Bahía and Sobrarbe
- José Pastor as Onofre Romera Pascual
- Cinta Ramírez as Chelo
- Lara Grube as Concha Perezagua
- Paco Tous as Francisco Picazo
- Laura Baena Torres as Rosita
- Óscar de la Fuente as Don Alberto Carabias
- Juan Fernández as Alejandro Perezagua
- Joaquín Núñez as Don Joaquín

== Production ==
The series was produced by Mediaset España in collaboration with Unicorn Content. It was created by Ignacio del Moral and Begoña Álvarez. The bulk of the shooting took place in a cortijo near Carmona, but footage was also shot in Huelva, Barcelona, Madrid, and Ceuta.

== Release ==
The series debuted on Telecinco on 22 May 2024. Ended on 26 June 2024, the linear television broadcasting run obtained "very positive" viewership figures.

== See also ==
- 2024 in Spanish television
