= Ben Temple =

American actor (born 1969)

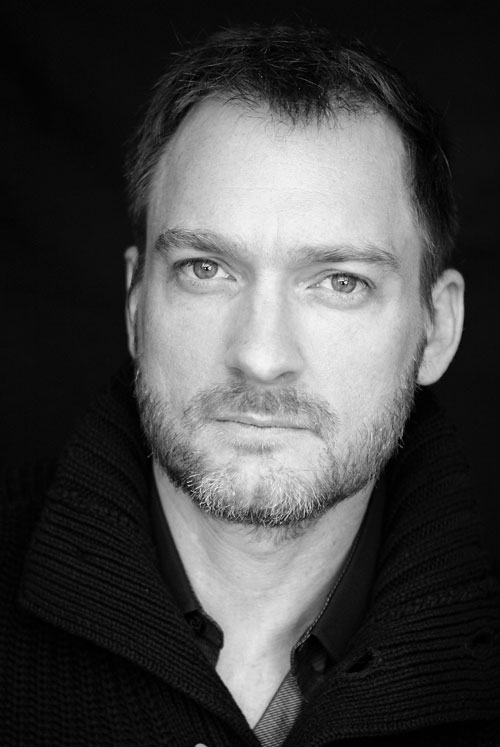
- Born: 1969 (age 56–57); New York City, U.S.
- Occupation: Actor
- Spouse: Alicia Borrachero (m. 2003)
- Children: 1

Ben Temple (born 1969) is an American-born actor who has developed his career in Spain.

== Biography ==
Ben Temple was born in 1969 in New York. After moving to Spain in 1991, he installed permanently in the country in 1999. In 2003, he married actress Alicia Borrachero, with whom he has had one child. He has developed a film and television career in Spain, including performances in series such as Policías, en el corazón de la calle, El comisario, Amar en tiempos revueltos, Cazadores de hombres, Crematorio, Hospital Central, Víctor Ros, El Ministerio del Tiempo and The Refugees and films such as Carol's Journey, The Galíndez File, Romasanta, REC, The Kovak Box and The Ignorance of Blood.

== Filmography ==
=== Film ===
Year	Title	Role	Notes	Ref.
2002	El viaje de Carol (Carol's Journey)	Robert		
2010	De mayor quiero ser soldado (I Want to Be a Soldier)	Captain Harry / Sergeant Cluster		
2015	Matar el tiempo (Killing Time)	Robert H. Walton		
2016	Anomalous	Captain		
2016	Inside	Isaac		
2018	Solo (Alone)	Nelo		
2022	Llegaron de noche (What Lucia Saw)	Father Tipton		
2022	Mamá, no enRedes	Frank		
2022	Un hombre de acción (A Man of Action)	Barrow		
2022	Upon Entry	Agent Barrett		

=== Television ===
Year	Title	Role	Notes	Ref.
2008	Cazadores de hombres			
2013	El tiempo entre costuras (The Time in Between)	Alan Hillgarth		
2014	Hermanos	Henry Sinclair		
2015	El ministerio del tiempo	Aaron Stein	Episode "Una negociación a tiempo"	
2016	La sonata del silencio (The Sonata of Silence)	Kaiser		
2016	Lo que escondían sus ojos	Samuel Hoare		
2019	En el corredor de la muerte	Clay Monroe		
2021	Madres. Amor y vida	Lorenzo	Introduced in season 3	
2022	The English	Dutch Van de Lote		
2025	When No One Sees Us	Seamus Hoopen		

== Accolades ==
Year	Award	Category	Work	Result	Ref.
2009	18th Actors and Actresses Union Awards	Best New Actor	Cazadores de hombres	Nominated	
2012	21st Actors and Actresses Union Awards	Best Film Actor in a Leading Role	I Want to Be a Soldier	Nominated	
