= Sheyla Fariña =

Spanish actress and voice actress (born 1986)

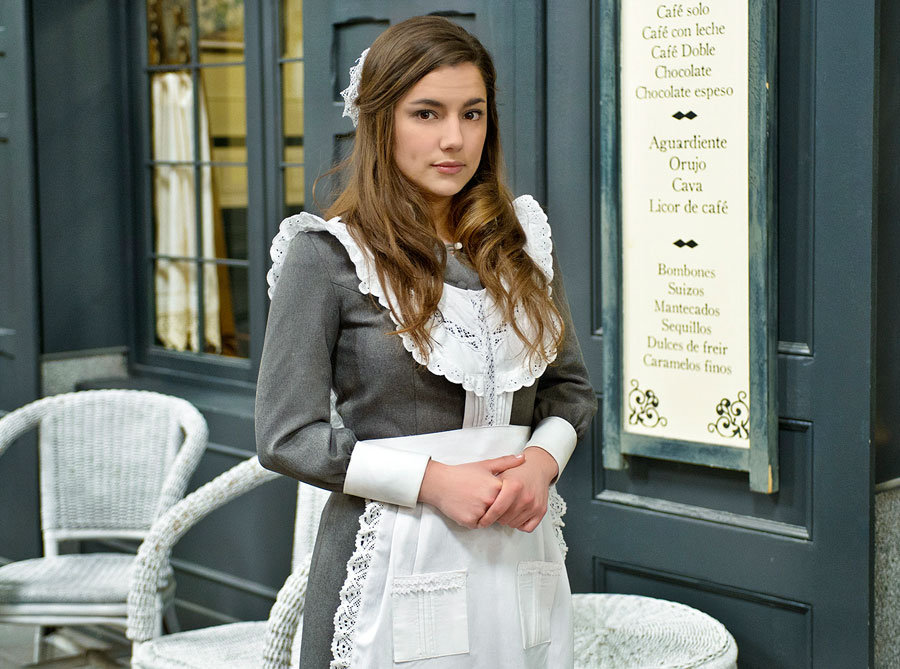
- Sheyla Fariña in 2016 on the set of the soap opera Acacias 38
- Born: Sheyla Fariña García; 12 November 1986 (age 39); Tordoia, A Coruña, Galicia, Spain
- Occupations: Actress and voice actress
- Years active: 2008–present
- Known for: Acacias 38
- Website: Sheyla Fariña

Sheyla Fariña García (born 12 November 1986) is a Spanish actress and voice actress, known for playing the leading role of Manuela Manzano / Carmen Blasco in the soap opera Acacias 38.

== Biography ==
Sheyla Fariña was born in 1986 in Tordoia, in the province of A Coruña, in the community of Galicia (Spain). In addition to Spanish, she speaks fluent English and Italian.

After graduating in drama from ESAD in Vigo, in 2007 she became known for playing the role of Xandra, one of the main characters in the telenovela Valderrei. After acting in theater groups such as Sardiña or Libélula in A Coruña, she appeared in small roles in Galician films and television series. In 2007 she starred in the short film Lúa e Leo directed by Clara García Nieto.

In 2008, she starred in the films Pradolongo (in the role of Carolina) directed by Ignacio Vilar and in Rafael directed by Xavier Bermúdez. In the same year, she starred in the short film Santiago de sangre directed by Francisco Calvelo. In 2009, she played the role of Laura in the television film O club da calceta directed by Antón Dobao. The following year, in 2010, she starred in the short film A estadea directed by Pablo Cacheda. The following year, in 2011, she starred in the film The Skin I Live In (La piel que habito) directed by Pedro Almodóvar. In 2012, she starred in the role of Elsa in the film Vilamor directed by Ignacio Vilar.

In 2014 and 2015 she played the role of Álex in the series Serramoura. In 2015 and 2016 she was chosen by TVE to play the role of Manuela Manzano in the soap opera broadcast on La 1 Acacias 38, alongside actors Roger Berruezo, Sara Miquel, Inés Aldea, Marc Parejo, Carlos Serrano-Clark and Alba Brunet. In 2016 she starred in the series Augasquentes (in the role of Elisa Pérez) and in Fontealba (in the role of Nina). The following year, in 2017, she starred in the series Pazo de Familia and in Vidago Palace. That same year she played the role of Alicia in the short film La madrina directed by Pedro Sancho. In 2018, she starred in the film Gun City directed by Dani de la Torre. The following year, in 2019, she starred in the film María Solinha directed by Ignacio Vilar. In 2020, she voiced in the short film De sangue e cristais directed by Lucía Ramiro and Bea Villar. In 2023 and 2024 he was part of the cast of the series Rapa, followed in 2024 by the film Zeta directed by Dani de la Torre.

== Filmography ==
=== Actriz ===
==== Film ====
Year	Title	Role	Director
2008	Pradolongo	Carolina	Ignacio Vilar
2011	Rafael		Xavier Bermúdez
2012	The Skin I Live In (La piel que habito)	Friend	Pedro Almodóvar
2012	Vilamor	Elsa	Ignacio Vilar
2018	La Sombra de la Ley		Dani de la Torre
2018	Gun City	Red-haired woman	Dani de la Torre
2019	María Solinha		Ignacio Vilar
2022	Os espazos en branco		Bruno Arias
2024	Zeta		Dani de la Torre

==== TV series ====
Year	Title	Role	Notes
2007	Valderrei	Xandra	90 episodes
2009	O club da calceta	Laura	TV film directed by Antón Dobao
2014–2015	Serramoura	Álex	31 episodes
2015–2016	Acacias 38	Manuela Manzano / Carmen Blasco	220 episodes
2016	Augasquentes	Elisa Pérez	1 episode
2016	Fontealba	Nina	150 episodes
2017	Pazo de familia	Nieves	12 episodes
2017	Vidago Palace	Dolores Câncio	6 episodes
2020	Xan		1 episode
2023–2024	Rapa	Lilith / Professor Stella	8 episodes

==== Short films ====
Year	Title	Role	Director
2007	Lúa e Leo		Clara García Nieto
2008	Santiago de sangre	Eva	Francisco Calvelo
2010	A estadea		Pablo Cacheda
2017	La madrina	Alicia	Pedro Sancho

=== Voice actress ===
==== Film ====
Year	Title	Director
2020	De sangue e cristais	Lucía Ramiro and Bea Villar

== Theater ==
Year	Title	Director	Theater
2014–2015, 2018–2019	Roedores	Álex Sampayo	Redrum Theatre
2018–2022	Contos do Recreo	Álex Sampayo	Redrum Theatre
2018–present	Invisibles	Marián Bañobre	Redrum Theatre
2018–2019	A nena que quería Navegar	Álex Sampayo	Redrum Theatre
2020–present	A conquista da escola de Madhubai	Xúlio Lago	Atlantic Theatre
2021–present	O home con gafas de pasta	Álex Sampayo	Redrum Theatre
2021–present	#2Pilgrims	Álex Sampayo	Redrum Theatre
2022–2023	Shakespeare en Roma	Sara Rey, Quico Cadaval, Rui Madeira, Xúlio Lago and María Barcala	Galician Drama Center
