= En el corredor de la muerte =

2019 Spanish drama television miniseries

- Genre: Drama
- Created by: Ramón Campos; Gema R. Neira; Diego Sotelo
- Based on: En el corredor de la muerte by Nacho Carretero
- Directed by: Carlos Marqués-Marcet
- Starring: Miguel Ángel Silvestre
- Country of origin: Spain
- Original languages: Spanish; English
- No. of seasons: 1
- No. of episodes: 4

Production
- Running time: 50 minutes
- Production companies: Movistar+; Bambú Producciones

Original release
- Network: Movistar+
- Release: 13 September 2019

En el corredor de la muerte is a 2019 Spanish drama television miniseries, created by Ramón Campos, Gema R. Neira and Diego Sotelo and directed by Carlos Marqués-Marcet for Movistar+, that premiered in four parts on September 13, 2019. The series is based on the same-titled nonfiction book by Nacho Carretero.

== Premise ==
The series depicts the judicial case that began in 1994 when club owner Casimir Sucharski and dancers Sharon Anderson and Marie Rodgers were found shot to death in Sucharski's house in Miramar, Florida. A poor quality surveillance video is the prosecution's main piece evidence against Pablo Ibar, a man of dual Spanish and American citizenship who had been arrested in a burglary incident. Ibar was first sentenced to capital punishment and spent sixteen years on death row, in an ongoing judicial process that has involved four trials.

== Cast ==
- Miguel Ángel Silvestre as Pablo Ibar.
- Marisé Álvarez as Tanya Ibar, Pablo's wife.
- Ramón Agirre as Cándido Ibar, Pablo's father and a former Basque pelotari who emigrated to Florida in the 1960s.
- Laura de la Uz as Cristina Casas, Pablo's mother and Cándido's ex-wife.
- Pau Poch as Michael Ibar, Pablo's brother.
- Gianpiero Cognoli as Phil Gentile, Miramar Police detective.
- Simao Cayatte as Charles Bennet, Miramar Police detective.
- Nick Devlin as Benjamin Waxman, Pablo's attorney.
- Eric Goode as Mike Rowland, prosecutor.
- Ben Temple as Clay Monroe, Pablo's first attorney.
- Erick Miranda as Michael Abernazy.
- Trisha Fernández as Saundra Wilkins.

== Production ==
En el corredor de la muerte is a Movistar+ original series produced in collaboration with Bambú Producciones. Ramón Campos, Teresa Fernández-Valdés, Diego Sotelo and Domingo Corral were credited as executive producers. The writing team was formed by Ramón Campos, Gema R. Neira, Diego Sotelo, Fran Navarro, David Moreno, Andrés Koppel and Carlos López. The episodes were directed by Carlos Marqués-Marcet.

Studio Canal handled the international sales.

== Episodes ==
No.	Title	Directed by	Original release date
1	"1993-1994"	Carlos Marqués-Marcet	September 13, 2019
2	"1994-2000"	Carlos Marqués-Marcet	September 13, 2019
3	"2000-2008"	Carlos Marqués-Marcet	September 13, 2019
4	"2008-2019"	Carlos Marqués-Marcet	September 13, 2019
