= Vulcania (film) =

- Spanish film poster
- Directed by: José Skaf
- Screenplay by: Diego Soto
- Produced by: David Matamoros; Madeleine Ekman; Eric Tavitian
- Starring: Miquel Fernández; Aura Garrido; Ginés García Millán; José Sacristán; Ana Wagener; Silvia Abril; Jaime Olías; Rubén Ochandiano
- Cinematography: Emilio Guirao
- Edited by: Ana Charte Isa; Elena Ruiz
- Music by: Arnau Bataller
- Production companies: Zentropa Spain; Zentropa Sweden; Ran Entertainment
- Distributed by: Alfa Pictures
- Release dates: 11 October 2015 (Sitges); 4 March 2016 (Spain)
- Countries: Spain; Sweden; France
- Language: Spanish

Vulcania is a 2015 dystopian drama film directed by José Skaf from a screenplay by Diego Soto which stars Miquel Fernández and Aura Garrido alongside Ginés García Millán, José Sacristán, Ana Wagener, Silvia Abril, Jaime Olías, and Rubén Ochandiano. It is a Spanish-French-Swedish international co-production.

== Plot ==
A dystopian drama set in an isolated community split in two sides working in a foundry, the plot follows Jonás and Marta, who begin to question themselves about their small universe.

== Cast ==
- Miquel Fernández as Jonás
- Aura Garrido as Marta
- Ginés García Millán as Adam
- José Sacristán as Sr. Valoquia
- Ana Wagener as Aurora
- Silvia Abril as Ruth
- Jaime Olías as Alex
- Rubén Ochandiano
- Andrés Herrera as Fran
- Jordi Gràcia as Fidel

== Production ==
The film is a Spanish-Swedish-French co-production by Zentropa Spain, Zentropa Sweden, and Ran Entertainment. It was shot in Spanish. Shooting locations in Catalonia included Tàrrega, Vall Fosca, and Lleida.

== Release ==
The film premiered at the 48th Sitges Film Festival in October 2015. Distributed by Alfa Pictures, it was released theatrically in Spain on 4 March 2016.

== Reception ==
Jonathan Holland of The Hollywood Reporter billed the film as a "low-budget dystopian tale" "stronger on atmospherics than on story", underlining as the bottom line "strong ideas and cast meet weak characters".

Paula Arantzazu Ruiz of Cinemanía rated the film 3 out of 5 stars, welcoming how the film distances itself by means its portrayal of claustrophobic oppression from the messianic tone of recent dystopian fictions catering to a teen audience.

Ricardo Aldarondo of Fotogramas rated the film 3 out of 5 stars, drawing out "the use of dystopia to talk about everyday things" as the best thing about the film, while negatively citing the "lack of resources to be more ambitious".

== Accolades ==
Year	Award	Category	Nominee(s)	Result	Ref.
2016	25th Actors and Actresses Union Awards	Best Film Actor in a Minor Role	José Sacristán	Nominated	

== See also ==
- List of Spanish films of 2016
