= Marian Arahuetes =

Spanish actress

- Born: Marian Arahuetes Castaño; 4 March 1987 (age 39); Madrid, Spain
- Occupation: Actress

Marian Arahuetes Castaño (Madrid, Spain, March 4, 1987) is a Spanish actress known for her role as Isabel Beneito in the series Gran Hotel, for the role of Pilar Lloveras in the series Amar es para siempre and for the role of Adela in the soap opera Acacias 38.

== Biography ==
Marian Arahuetes was born on March 4, 1987, in Madrid. Since she was a child, she has cultivated a passion for acting.

== Career ==
Marian Arahuetes is a Spanish actress who studied acting at the la Compañía Nacional Teatro Clásico in Madrid, the Taller Jóvenes Actores del Teatro La Abadía in Madrid, the Central de Cine in Madrid, and the Real Escuela Superior de Arte Dramático in Madrid, where she took courses in fencing, stage fighting, verse, vocal technique, and textual interpretation.

Her first appearance on the small screen was in 2006, when she played the role of Mina in the film Diente por ojo, directed by Eidvind Holmboe. In 2009, she played the role of Orpha in the film Mujeres de la Biblia, la historia de Ruth, directed by Denise M. Goodwin.

In 2011, she starred in the series 14 de abril.La República. The following year, in 2012, she played the role of Sister Beatriz in the series Bandolera.

In 2012 and 2013, she played the role of Isabel Beneito in Gran Hotel. In 2013, she played the role of Candela in the series Cosas de sofá. That same year, she played the role of Lourdes in the series Gran Reserva: El origen. In 2013, she played the role of Virginia in the cartoon V de Virginia by Máster Globomedia.

In 2013 and 2014, she played the role of Pilar Lloveras in the Amar es para siempre.

In 2015, she played the role of Lina in the film Constelación urbana directed by Luis Galán. The following year, in 2016, she starred in the feature film Le Ve, directed by herself.

In 2017, she played the role of Catalina in the series Seis hermanas. Also in the same year, she starred in the film Red de libertad.

Also in 2017, she joined the cast of the soap opera Acacias 38, where she played the role of Adela until 2018, when her character died.

== Filmography ==
=== Cinema ===
Year	Title	Character	Directed by
2006	Diente por ojo	Mina	Eidvind Holmboe
2009	Mujeres de la Biblia, la historia de Ruth	Orpha	Denise M. Goodwin
2017	Red de libertad	Suzette	Pablo Moreno
2021	Petra de San José	Petra de San José	Pablo Moreno
2023	La sirvienta		Pablo Moreno
2024	Pastoris	Justa	Pablo Moreno

=== Television ===
Year	Title	Character	Notes
2011	14 de abril. La República		TV series
2012	Bandolera	Sor Beatriz	TV series
2012–2013	Gran Hotel	Isabel Beneito	TV series
2013	Cosas de sofá	Candela	TV series
2013	Gran Reserva: El origen	Lourdes	TV series
2013–2014	Amar es para siempre	Pilar Lloveras	TV series
2016	La que se avecina	Compañera de piso	TV series
2017	Seis hermanas	Catalina	TV series
2017–2018	Acacias 38	Adela	163 episodes

=== Short films ===
Year	Title	Character	Directed by
2013	V de Virginia	Virginia	Máster Globomedia
2015	Constelación urbana	Lina	Luis Galán
2016	Le Ve	Herself	Marian Arahuetes
