= Abril Montilla =

Spanish actress and model (born 1976)

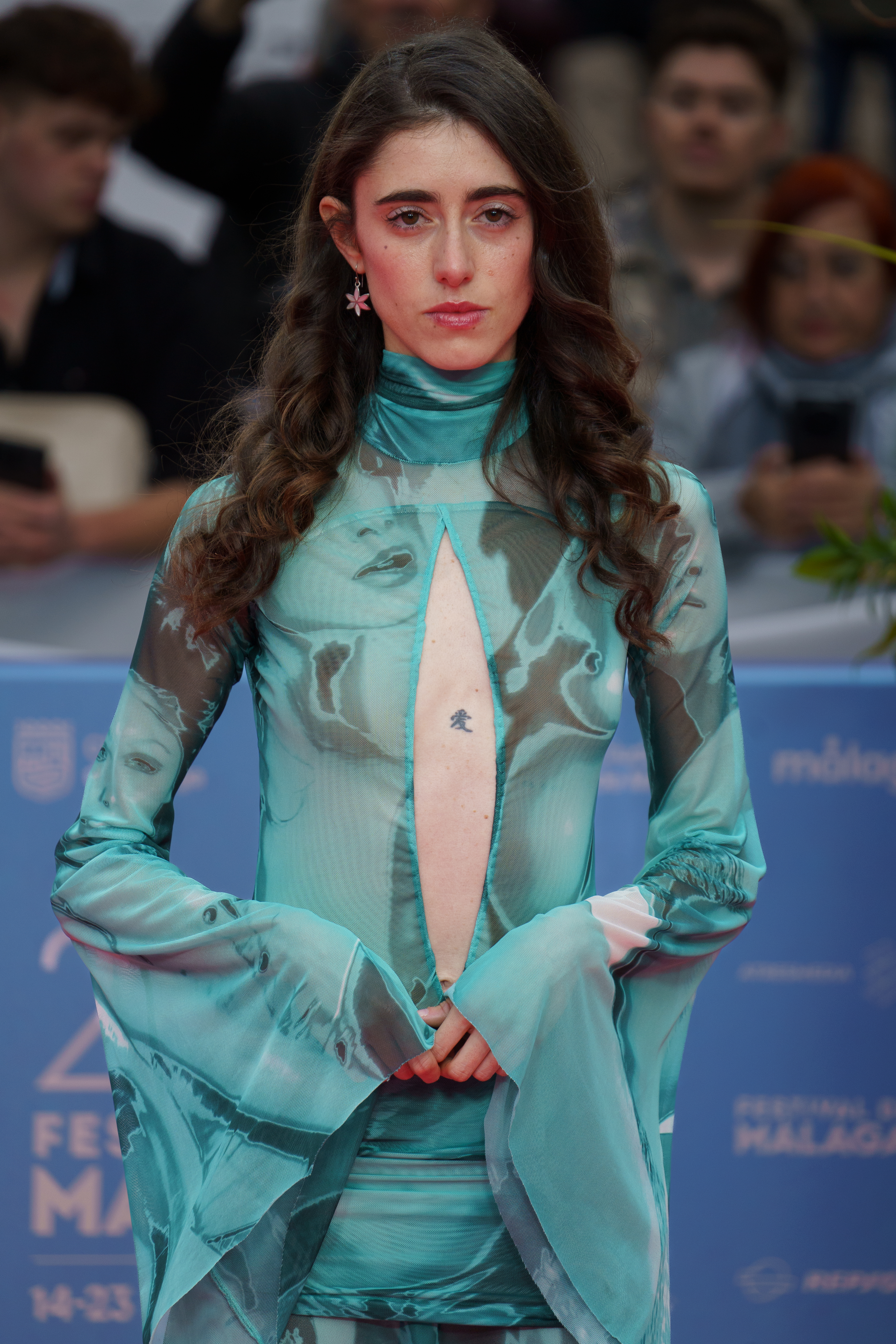
- Montilla in 2025
- Born: Abril Montilla Parra; October 3, 2000 (age 25)
- Occupation: Actress
- Years active: 2017–present
- Notable work: Nuria in Éramos pocos

Abril Montilla Parra (born October 3, 2000) is a Spanish actress. She is known for playing María Jesús in the TVE series La otra mirada and Alodia in Acacias 38.

== Biography ==
She studied at the CEIP "Luis Buñuel" in Málaga. Abril is the daughter of actress María José Parra. She received her artistic training at the Triarte artistic studies center. After performing in several theatrical productions, she participated in the Andalusian television series Éramos pocos on Canal Sur, marking her first television appearance.

In 2018, she gained popularity thanks to her role in the TVE series La otra mirada, playing one of the protagonists, María Jesús Junio Crespo.

In February 2020, she joined the main cast of the daily series Acacias 38 on Televisión Española, remaining in the series until its conclusion in May 2021. That same year, she appeared in the Netflix miniseries Someone Has to Die and in the series 30 Coins, a fiction by Álex de la Iglesia for HBO Spain.

In July 2021, it was announced that she would join the second season of the series Desaparecidos, airing on Amazon Prime Video, where she plays Estela.

In 2023, she joined the cast of Urban. La vida es nuestra playing Tania.

== Filmography ==
=== Television ===
Year	Title	Role	Network	Notes
2017	Éramos pocos	Nuria	Canal Sur	13 episodes
2018–2019	La otra mirada	María Jesús Junio Crespo	TVE	21 episodes
2019	La peste	Extra	Movistar+	1 episode
2020–2021	Acacias 38	Doña Alodia de Quiroga	TVE	267 episodes
2020	Someone Has to Die	Isabel	Netflix	3 episodes
2020	30 Coins	Elvira	HBO Spain	2 episodes
2021	Desaparecidos	Estela	Prime Video and Telecinco	4 episodes
2023	Pollos sin cabeza	Cristina	HBO Max	5 episodes
2023	Urban. La vida es nuestra	Tania	Prime Video	6 episodes
