= Antonio Velázquez =

Spanish actor

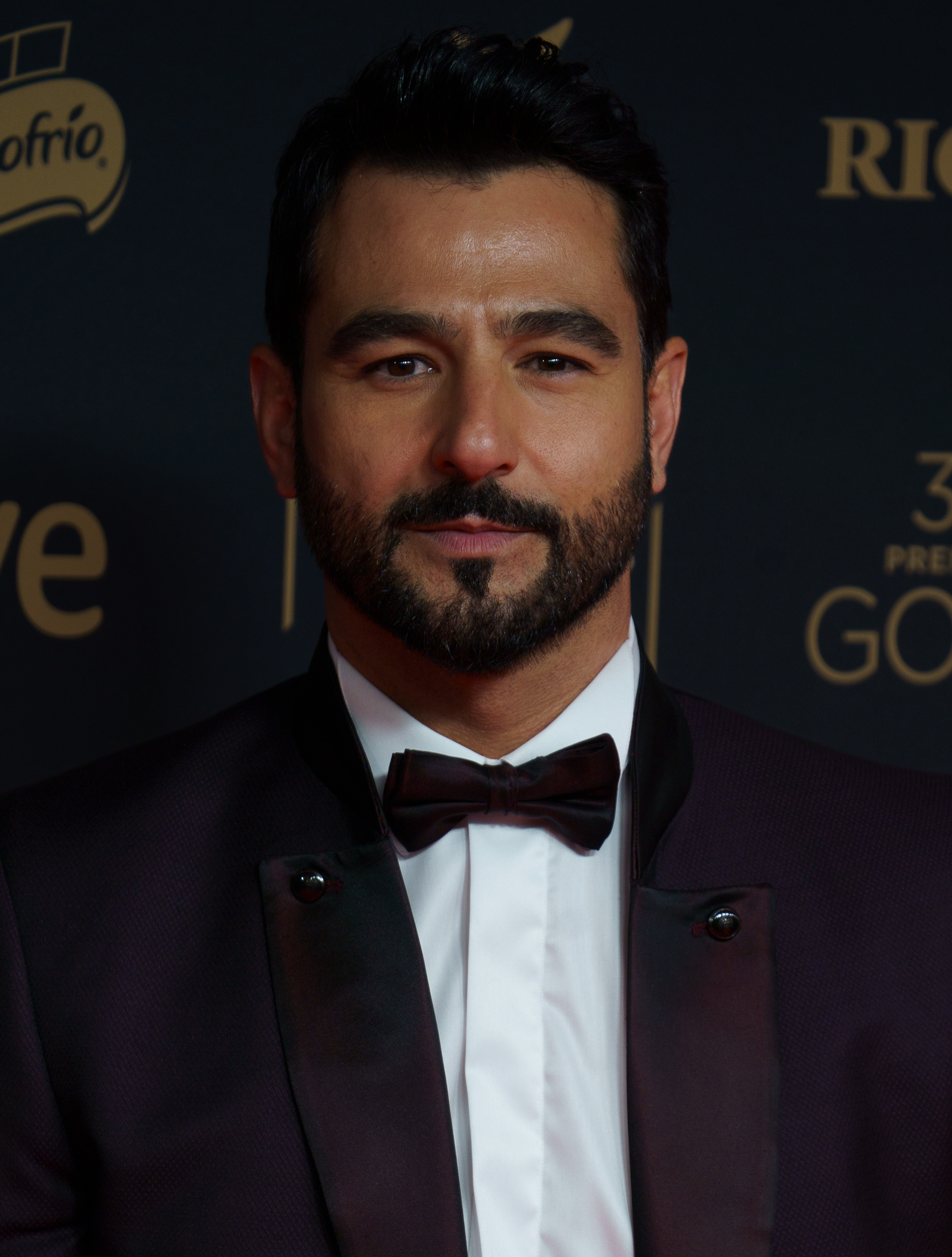
- Velázquez in 2017
- Born: Antonio Velázquez Bautista; 1981; Granada, Spain
- Occupation: Actor

Antonio Velázquez Bautista (born 1981) is a Spanish actor.

== Biography ==
Antonio Velázquez Bautista was born in 1981 in Granada. He was raised in the small village of Pinos del Valle, spending most of his childhood in the 'Venta de la Cebada' cortijo. He studied to become a sub-officer in the Spanish Armed Forces, but he switched to acting in 1999.

The first decade of his acting career featured credits in supporting and guest roles in TV series such as Arrayán, SMS: Sin Miedo a Soñar, Aída, Matrimonio con hijos, Mesa para cinco and Cuenta atrás. He landed a starring role in the ensemble cast of the comedy series ¡A ver si llego!, aired on Telecinco in 2009, performing the role of Mike, a "seductive" fishmonger. He earned early public recognition performing the lead role of Paquirri in the biopic telefilm of the same name, also broadcast in 2009. He earned further popularity for his role as Aníbal Bravo in Tierra de lobos. He has later appeared in series such as Hermanos, Cable Girls, and Traición.

== Filmography ==
Television

Year	Title	Role	Notes	Ref
2009	¡A ver si llego!	Mike	Main	
2009	Sin tetas no hay paraíso	Iván Sierra	Introduced in Season 3	
2009	Paquirri	Paquirri	TV movie	
2010–2014	Tierra de lobos	Aníbal Bravo	Main	
2014	Hermanos	Juan Torres	Lead role	
2016	El ministerio del tiempo	The true Cid	Guest role. Season 2. Episode 1	
2016	Buscando el norte	Álex	Main	
2017	El final del camino	Gonzalo de Catoira	Lead role	
2017–2018	Traición	Carlos	Main	
2017–2020	Las chicas del cable (Cable Girls)	Inspector Cueva	Main	
2020	30 monedas (30 Coins)	Roque	Recurring	
2021	Libertad	Saldaña	Miniseries. Also released in a feature film format	
2021	Grasa	Rafa		
2023	La Promesa	Mauro Moreno		

Film

Year	Title	Role	Notes	Ref
2011	Seis puntos sobre Emma (Six Points About Emma)	Jorge		
2012	Tengo ganas de ti (I Want You)	Serpiente		
2014	Cuatro lunas (Four Moons)	Hugo	Starring role	
2015	Mi gran noche (My Big Night)	Antonio		
2019	El asesino de los caprichos (The Goya Murders)	Alberto		
2019	Los Rodríguez y el más allá	Ricardo		
