= Jaime Olías =

Spanish actor and director

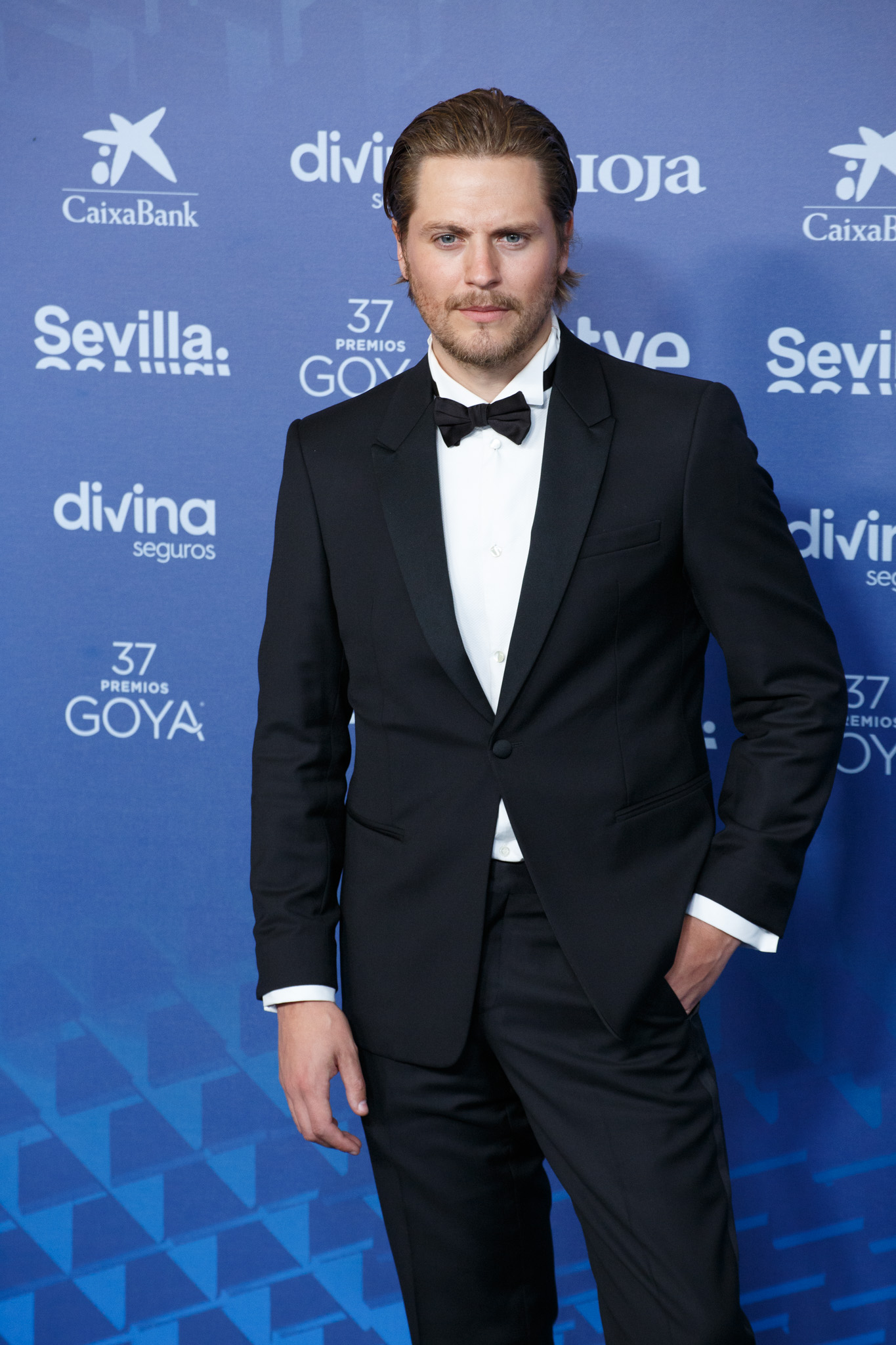
- Olías the 37th Goya Awards, 2023
- Born: Jaime Olías de Lima Pancorbo; 22 December 1989 (age 35); Torrelodones, Community of Madrid, Spain
- Occupations: Actor; director

Jaime Olías de Lima Pancorbo (born 22 December 1989) is a Spanish actor and director.

== Life and career ==
Jaime Olías de Lima Pancorbo was born in Torrelodones on 22 December 1989. He landed his acting debut in his second casting call, at age 18, to star in supernatural drama series Ángel o demonio. He later earned a degree on audivisual communication and trained in direction and screenwriting. He made his feature film debut as an actor in Ghost Graduation (2012). He co-created and directed HBO Max streaming series Cómo mandarlo todo a la mierda (2022). He has directed short films The Sound of Mine and Chaval, which earned a nomination to the Goya Award for Best Fictional Short Film.

== Filmography (actor) ==
=== Feature films ===
Year	Title	Role	Notes	Ref.
2012	Promoción fantasma (Ghost Graduation)	Jorge		
2014	Open Windows			
2015	Solo química (Just a Little Chemistry)	Hans		
2015	De chica en chica (Girl Gets Girl)			
2015	Vulcania	Alex		

=== Television ===
Year	Title	Role	Notes	Ref.
2011	Ángel o demonio	Damián		
2012	Toledo, cruce de destinos	Fernando		
2015	La dama velata	Matteo Staineri		
2015	Acacias 38	Claudio		
2015–16	Yo quisiera	Diego		
2017	El final del camino	Diego Gelmírez		
2018	Servir y proteger	Iago Narbona		
2020–21	El Cid	Alfonso		
2021	Besos al aire (Blowing Kisses)	Claudio		
2024	Beguinas	Munio de Avellaneda (Conde de Vellaví)		
