= Alex Conrado =

Alex Corrado
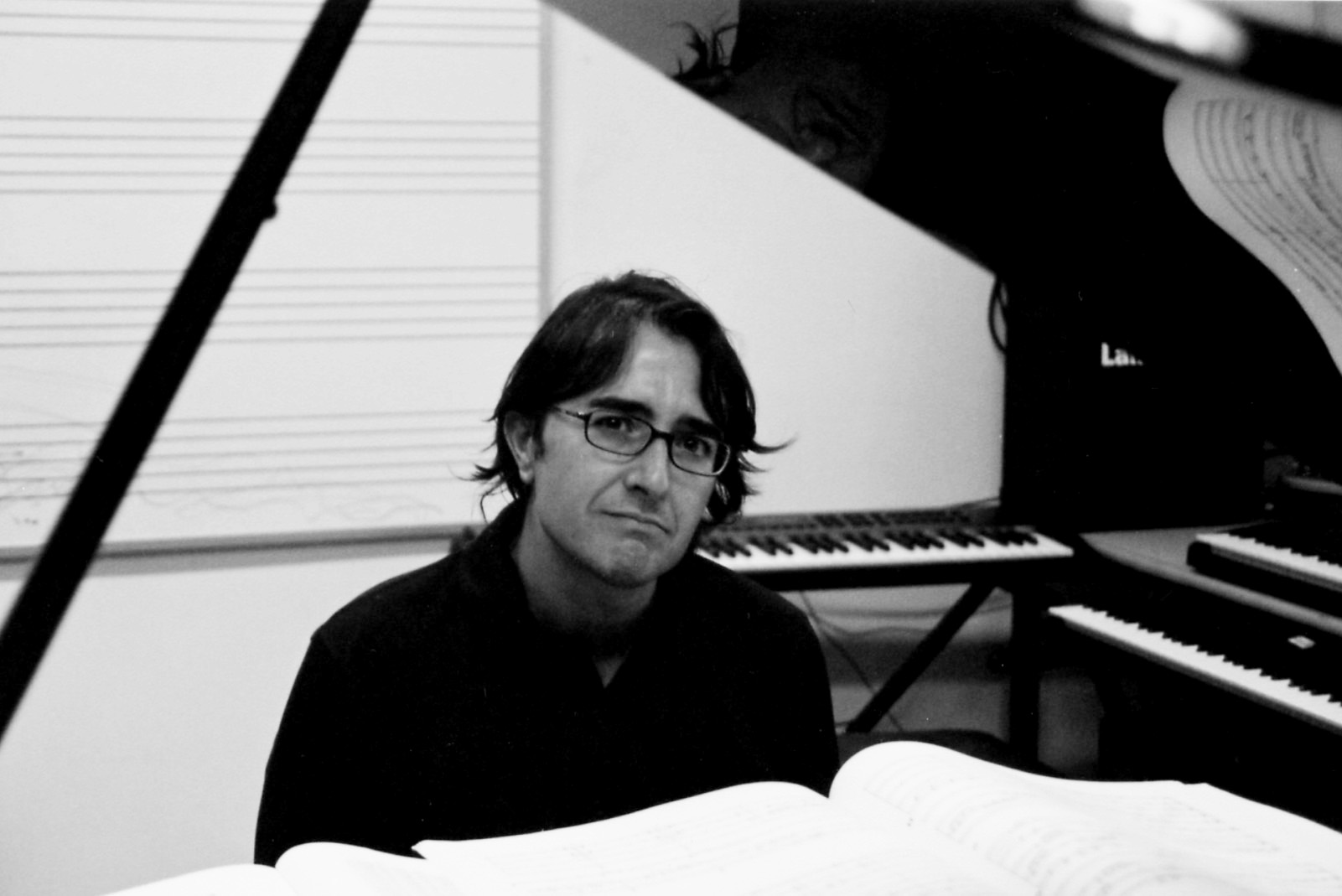
- Alex Conrado at his studio
- Born: 29 March 1969 (age 56); Madrid, Spain
- Occupations: Musician, composer

Álex Conrado (born 29 March 1969) is a Spanish soundtrack composer for TV and cinema.

== Biography ==
Born and raised in Madrid, he has been musical since an early age. At seven he learnt to play the guitar and, at twelve, he and his brother formed a band and composed, sang and performed their own songs.

He attended the Madrid Royal Conservatory, where he studied piano, orchestration and composition, and he graduated in 1996 with the Flora Prieto Award in harmony and composition.

Between 1991 and 1999, he researched and studied under famous avant-garde composers such as György Ligeti, Helmut Lachenmann, Klaus Metzger, Mathias Espahlinger, Mauricio Kagel, Franco Donatoni, and Brian Ferneyhough.

Interested in discovering new musical languages, he entered the field of electroacoustic music. In 1993 he co-founded the Laboratory of Electroacoustic Music at the Conservatorio Padre Soler, where he worked as a composer until 1996. That same year, the CDMC (Center for the Diffusion of Contemporary Music) granted Alex a scholarship that allowed him to research and work in the laboratories of the center.

In 1996 he became the director of the Conservatorio Maestro Alonso, in San Lorenzo del Escorial, Spain, and held this position until 2004.

== Film music ==
Parallel to his activity as a classic musician, and as his interest for film music grew stronger, he spent four years studying under film music composers of Spain, such as Antón García Abril, Carmelo Bernaola and José Nieto.

One of his first approaches to film music has been with Pedro Almodóvar’s film La Flor de mi Secreto (1996), in which he worked as an assistant for composer Alberto Iglesias.

In 2002, he created the course "Techniques for Film Music Composition," taught at the Conservatorio Virtual. This programme has graduated nearly two hundred students from all around the globe.

His first commissioned full-length film came in 2004 with the movie Cinemart, directed by Jordi Mollá. A year later, he created the music score for the film Viure sense por (A Life Without Fear), directed by Carlos Perez Ferré and produced by In Vitro Films, for which he was awarded the Best Film Soundtrack Award at the Mostra Cinema Valencia. Since then, Alex has worked regularly for In Vitro Films and his scores can be found in many of the company's productions.

He has recently worked with advertisements, with director Carlos Lascano for the Al Balad advertisement campaign, awarded at the 2009 Dubai Lynx International Advertising Festival. In 2011 we worked with Lascano again, this time in "A Shadow of Blue" a mixed-technique animated short film that got pre-selected to the 84th edition of the Academy Awards.

During 2011 and the beginning of 2012, Alex composed the music for two Spanish TV shows, both broadcast by Antena 3: El secreto de Puente Viejo and Toledo.

For "El Secreto de Puente Viejo", Alex received a nomination for Best Music in the XV edition of the Iris Awards of the Academia de las Ciencias y las Artes de Televisión de España.

== Works ==
- 2004 Cinemart (Directed by Jordi Mollá)
- 2005 Viure sense por (Directed by Carlos Pérez)
- 2006 Libro de familia (Directed by Ricard Figueras)
- 2006 Tirando a dar (Directed by Cesar Rodríguez)
- 2007 Para que nadie olvide tu nombre (Directed by Cesar Martínez)
- 2007 El estafador (Directed by Ricard Figueras)
- 2008 Adrenalina (Directed by Joseph Johnson and Ricard Figueras)
- 2008 Violetas (Directed by Rafa Montesinos)
- 2011 El secreto de Puente Viejo (Different directors)
- 2011 A Shadow of Blue (Directed by Carlos Lascano)
- 2011 Return (Directed by Nikita Ovsyannikov)
- 2012 Toledo (Directed byLuis Santamaría)
- 2015 "Acacias 38"
