= Diego Peláez (bishop) =

Diego Peláez was an eleventh-century bishop of Santiago de Compostela and a prominent figure in the Galician ecclesiastical nobility. He contributed to the growth of the diocese and its territories during the Middle Ages.

== Bishop of Santiago de Compostela ==
Diego Peláez was named bishop shortly after García, king of Galicia, was imprisoned by his brother Sancho II of Castile. However, the bishop continued to be suspected of supporting the former.

He undertook the reorganization of the Lands of Santiago (Tierra de Santiago) from the river Iso to the Atlantic. He improved the justice, administration, and military defense against attacks from both Normans and Iberian threats, minted coins and encouraged trade, and took measures against the decline of the clergy, making agreements with the monastery of Antealtares and limiting the expansion of the monastery of San Martín Pinario.

Around 1075, he began work on the Romanesque cathedral of Santiago which would, through its cathedral school, become an influential centre of European culture. One Master Bernardo was appointed head of the project. This marks a turning point in pilgrimage to Compostela as a wider phenomenon. Peláez is also considered one of the driving forces of the Gregorian Reform in the Spanish Christian kingdoms.

== Downfall ==
Diego Peláez's position as a noble highlights his confrontation with Alfonso VI of León. Upon Alfonso's conquest of the taifa of Toledo in 1085, he wished to counteract the appointment of Toledo, which had been the Visigoth capital, as the new ecclesiastical head of the Christian kingdoms in Spain. He aspired for Santiago de Compostela to fulfill this role, as an apostolic see and centre of the cult of St. James. However, neither the Galician see of Braga, nor the Leonese see of Toledo would allow a newly minted see to violate what they believed to be their historic right.

It appears that he was involved in the uprising of the Galician noble Rodrigo Ovéquiz, which Alfonso VI spent two years putting down, and which he attempted to resolve by splitting the Kingdom of Galicia into two feudal territories. The land north of the river Miño was given to his daughter Urraca (totia Gallecie Imperatrix) and her husband, Raymond of Burgundy. The land south of the river was given to his illegitimate daughter Teresa and her husband Enrique de Borgoña, creating the second County of Portugal.

Among this turbulent political context, Diego Peláez was accused of treason. He may have been conspiring with William of Normandy to restore Galicia as an independent kingdom. As a result, he was deposed in 1088 at the Council of Husillos and imprisoned by Alfonso VI. Pedro, the abbot of Cardeña, was appointed as his successor, as he posed no threat to the king's ambitions in Galicia. Pope Urban II declared this appointment null and illegitimate, since it had been done without papal permission, and reproached Alfonso. However, he did confirm the removal of Peláez from his see, though allowed him to maintain the title of bishop in case he was needed in another diocese. The pressures of the Leonese court and the archbishop Bernard of Toledo did not aid Peláez's efforts to be restored to his see. He escaped his imprisonment in 1094 and took refuge in the kingdom of Aragón; the same year, the Cluniac Dalmacio was named bishop of Iria and Santiago de Compostela. Dalmacio had been sent by Hugh of Cluny with the purpose of resolving a dispute between Raymond and Henry of Burgundy.

Diego Peláez died in exile. Diego Gelmírez, his protégé and future bishop of Compostela, would speak favourably of him in the Historia Compostelana. It has been suggested that Gelmírez may have played a part in the downfall of Peláez, and later felt guilty, which may have contributed to the positive portrayal of him in the history as well as Gelmírez's reluctance to travel through Aragón in the following years.
