= Boomerang TV =

Spanish production company

Grupo Boomerang TV
- Type: Subsidiary
- Industry: Entertainment
- Founded: 1998; 28 years ago
- Founders: Pepe Abril; Pedro Ricote; Juan José Diaz
- Headquarters: Madrid, Spain
- Key people: Jorge Pezzi (CEO)
- Parent: Lagardère Studios (2015–2020); Mediawan (2020–present)
- Divisions: Boomerang TV Chilé; Boomerang TV Italia
- Website: www.grupoboomerangtv.com

Boomerang TV, S.A. also known as Grupo Boomerang TV (Grupo BTV) is a Spanish independent audiovisual entertainment production company that is owned by French audiovisual production & distribution company Mediawan. It was founded in 1998 by Pepe Abril and Pedro Ricote

== History ==
In January 2008, British investment group 3i had acquired a 40% stake in the Spanish independent production studio Boomerang TV to help increase the producer's expansion.

In March 2010, Boomerang TV Group had established a joint-venture production subsidiary with the Dutch global entertainment company Talpa Media to bring Talpa Media's programming formats into Spain as part of Talpa's international expansion strategy, with the joint-venture production subsidiary would handle exclusive rights to sell, adapt, and produce Talpa’s entire global catalog of reality, gaming, and scripted formats within Spain for its Spanish television networks in the country.

In October 2010, Boomerang TV and Grupo Godó who launched a joint venture Barcalona-based production company Veranda TV four years ago in 2006, jointly established a Catalonia-based Spanish fiction & factual production company Nova Veranda with Verana's Carles Gené named CEO of the joint venture production company.

In May 2015, French entertainment production division Lagardère Entertainment alongside its parent company Lagardère Active had brought an 82% majority stake Grupo Boomerang TV including its divisions and had it placed under Lagardère Entertainment, marking Lagardère Entertainment's first international acquisition outside of France and their first expansion into the international television market along with their expansion of their operations into Spain & their entry into the Spanish television market, Grupo Boomerang TV founders Pepe Abril, Pedro Ricote and Juan José Diaz continued to run the company under Largarère Entertainment.

In 2016, Boomerang TV launch its Chilean division based in Chile,

By January 2017, Boomerang TV sold their Galician-based production company Portocabo who co-produced The Avatars with the former to its general director Alfonso Blanco

Five years later however in June 2020, French audiovisual production and distribution company Mediawan was in exclusive negotiations to acquire Largardère's entertainment production & distribution division Lagardère Studios that include their Spanish entertainment production subsidiary Grupo Boomerang TV for €100 million in order to expand Mediawan's international production output including their entry into the Spanish television market. Five months later in November of that same year, Mediawan completed its acquisition of Grupo Boomerang TV's French entertainment production & distribution parent company Lagardère Studios from Lagardère, effectively marked Mediawan's expansion into the Spanish television market with Boomerang TV became Mediawan's Spanish production subsidiary. A week later on the 11th of that same month following Mediawan's acquisition of Grupo Boomerang TV's former French entertainment production & distribution parent Lagardère Studios, Mediawan established a Spanish production hub named Mediawan Studios Spain that brings Mediawan's Spanish production companies under one group with Boomerang TV being moved under the new production division.

On March 28, 2023, Grupo Boomerang TV announced that they've hired former founder & CEO of LaCoproductora Jorge Pezzi as their new CEO of the Spanish production company with their co-founders Pedro Ricote and Juan José Diaz stepped down as co-CEOs & presidents after leading the Spanish production company for 25 years.

== Filmography ==
Title	Years	Network	Notes
Los misterios de Laura	2009–2014	La 1	
El secreto de Puente Viejo	2011–2020	Antena 3	
Toledo, cruce de destinos	2012	Antena 3	
La Voz	2012–present	Telecinco/Antena 3	co-production with Talpa (seasons 1–6) and ITV Studios (season 7–)
Top Chef España	2013–2017	Antena 3	
The Time in Between	2013–2014	Antena 3	
The Avatars	2013–2014	Clan TVE; Disney Channel Italia (Italy)	co-production with Portocabo, Fly Distribuzione TV and Brave Films
La Voz Kids	2014–present	Telecinco/Antena 3	co-production with Talpa (seasons 1–5) and ITV Studios (season 6–)
Acacias 38	2015–2021	La 1	
Top Dance	2016	Antena 3	
The Vineyard	2021	Amazon Prime Video	co-production with Atresmedia Studios
Between Lands	2023	Atresplayer	
La Moderna	2023–2025	La 1	co-production with Mediawan
¿Algo que declarar?	Summer 2025	La 1	co-production with NBCUniversal Formats
