= Esmeralda Moya =

Spanish actress

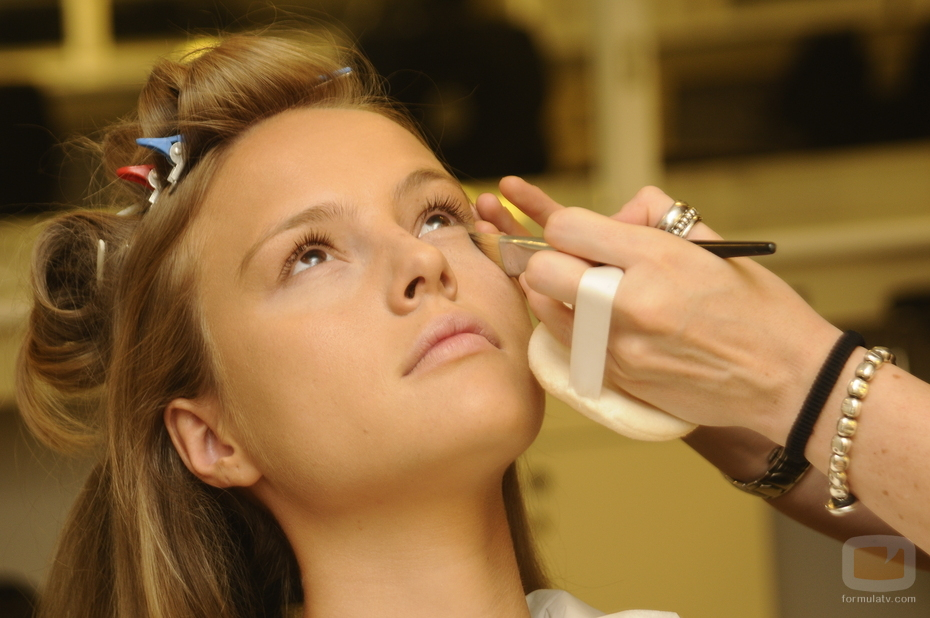
- Born: Esmeralda Moya Cañas; 31 August 1985 (age 40); Torrejón de Ardoz, Madrid, Spain
- Occupation: Actress
- Years active: 2007-present

Esmeralda Moya Cañas (Torrejón de Ardoz, Madrid, 31 August 1985) is a Spanish actress and model. She is known especially for her characters in the television series Los protegidos, 90-60-90, diario secreto de una adolescente and Tierra de lobos.

== Biography ==
At the age of 16, Moya started working as a model, participating in several campaigns and national and international magazines. For some time, she lived with her mother in different cities, such as Paris, London, Milan, New York, and Tokyo. Currently, she lives in Torrejón de Ardoz. After a time dedicated to fashion, Esmeralda considered her future, and it was then that she decided to return to Madrid and begin her acting studies at Cristina Rota's school.

She made her debut on the small screen with Circulo rojo in 2006. In 2008, she appeared in sporadic roles in series such as Desaparecida and El castigo.

In 2009, she made her debut on the big screen with Mentiras y Gordas, by Alfonso Albacete and David Menkes, which premiered on March 27 of that year. She starred in the movie with Mario Casas and Ana de Armas. During the same year, she also had regular roles in TVE's U.C.O and Antena 3's 90-60-90.

In 2009, Esmeralda joined the cast of Cuatro's series, Hay alguien ahí, where she played Amanda for two seasons.

She gained great popularity in 2010 with her character Claudia Ruano for the Antena 3 series Los protegidos, where she shared the cast with Ana Fernández and Luis Fernández. Esmeralda left the series in the third and final season of the series.

In 2011, she starred in Telecinco's mini-series La Baronesa, a biopic of the life of Baronesa Thyssen. Esmeralda played Carmen Cervera in her younger years. Also that year, she joined the filming of the Telecinco series Homicidios alongside Eduardo Noriega and Celia Freijeiro, where she played Helena.

In 2012, she was part of the cast of the film Clara No es nombre de mujer by director Pepe Carbajo.

In 2013, she joined the third season of the Telecinco series Tierra de Lobos, in which she participated until the end of the following year. In 2014, she participated in the daily series of Cuatro Ciega a citas. Also that year, she starred in the Televisión española series Víctor Ros alongside Carles Francino.

In 2015, we saw her again on the big screen in the film Solo Química, alongside Alejo Sauras and Ana Fernández. She also appeared in Sara Escudero's Te elegiría otra vez that year.

In 2016, it was announced that the TVE series Víctor Ros would be renewed for a second season, in which she would appear again.

Also in 2016, she participated in the new Telecinco series La verdad, alongside Jon Kortajarena.

Her signing for the La 1 series Servir y proteger was announced in November 2021.

== Filmography ==
=== Films ===
Films
Year	Title	Character	Role
2007	Aedea	Meletea	Short film
2009	Mentiras y gordas	Nuria	Secondary role
2012	¡Atraco!	Dependienta	Minor role
2012	Clara no es nombre de mujer	Ana	Secondary role
2012	Way out	Andrea	Short film
2015	Solo química	Susanna	Secondary role
2016	Por si me muero	Marla	Short film
2018	Sin novedad	Alba	Main role

=== Television series ===
Television series
Year	Title	Character	Channel	Role
2007	Círculo rojo	Lucía Villalobos	Antena 3	12 episodes
2007–2008	Desaparecida	Blanca Sierra	La 1	3 episodes
2008	Sin tetas no hay paraíso		Telecinco	1 episode
2008	El castigo	Eva	Antena 3	2 episodes
2009	90-60-90, diario secreto de una adolescente	Melania 'Mel' Álvarez	Antena 3	8 episodes
2009	UCO	Blanca Sierra	La 1	10 episodes
2009–2010	Hay alguien ahí	Amanda Ríos	Cuatro	17 episodes
2010–2011	Los protegidos	Claudia Ruano	Antena 3	22 episodes
2011	Homicidios	Helena Cuevas	Telecinco	11 episodes
2011	Tita Cervera, la baronesa	Tita Cervera	Telecinco	2 episodes
2013–2014	Tierra de lobos	Victoria Eugenia Montes	Telecinco	8 episodes
2014	Ciega a citas	Ana	Cuatro	11 episodes
2015–2016	Víctor Ros	Clara Alvear	La 1	7 episodes
2017	Apaches	Ana	Antena 3	3 episodes
2018	La verdad	Laura Santos	Telecinco	14 episodes
2019	45 revoluciones	Celia Vera	Antena 3	6 episodes
2022	Historias de protegidos	Claudia Ruano	Atresplayer Premium	
2022–present	Servir y proteger	Luna Requena	La 1	

=== Theater ===
Theater
Year	Title	Character	Role
2015	Te elegiría otra vez	Petunia	Main role

=== Television programs ===
Television programs
Year	Title	Channel	Role
2013–2015	Pasapalabra	Telecinco	Guest
2020–2021	Pasapalabra	Antena 3	Guest
2016–2017	Hora punta	La 1	Contributor
2017	Dani & Flo	Cuatro	Guest
2018	Viajeras con B	La Sexta	Guest
2021	El cazador	La 1	Contestant
