= Los protegidos =

Los protegidos may refer to:

- Los protegidos (Colombian TV series), a 2008–2009 telenovela
- Los protegidos (Spanish TV series), a 2010–2012 fantasy series
- Los protegidos: El regreso, a 2021–2023 Spanish fantasy TV series
