= Víctor Ros =

- Genre: Mystery; Police procedural
- Starring: Carles Francino
- Country of origin: Spain
- Original language: Spanish
- No. of seasons: 2
- No. of episodes: 14

Production
- Production companies: TVE; New Atlantis; Telefónica Studios

Original release
- Network: Movistar TV; La 1
- Release: 1 April 2014 – 22 December 2016

Víctor Ros is a Spanish crime mystery television series starring Carles Francino. It is based on the Jerónimo Tristante' novels about the namesake fictional detective set in late 19th-century Madrid. The first season was originally released on Movistar TV in 2014 before its free-to-air broadcasting on La 1 in early 2015, while the second season aired on the latter channel in late 2016.

== Premise ==
The first season, set in Madrid in 1895, follows the innovative investigations of Víctor Ros (Carles Francino), a police officer from the Brigada Metropolitana de Madrid, the first Spanish law enforcement unit employing scientific and deductive techniques. The plot of the second season, also featuring Ros as lead character, takes place three years after the events of the first season and the fiction develops in Madrid and Linares, in the province of Jaén.

== Cast ==
- Carles Francino as Víctor Ros.
- Megan Montaner as Lola la Valenciana.
- Esmeralda Moya as Clara Alvear.
- Tito Valverde como Don Armando.
- Joel Bosqued as Sánchez.
- Helio Pedregal como Roberto Aldanza.
- Tomás del Estal as Blázquez.
- Lola Marceli as Doña Rosa.
- Luis Zahera as Sarabia.
- Juan Fernández as Comisario Buendía.
- Nacho Fresneda as Fernando de la Escosura.

== Production and release ==
The project was presented to TVE in 2013 by New Atlantis. Filming started by September 2013.

Produced by TVE, New Atlantis and Telefónica Studios, the series made extensive use of green chroma key, to the point that 90% of shots required digital effects. Settings such as the Puerta del Sol and the Plaza Mayor were fully recreated in postproduction. The episodes of the first season were directed by Gracia Querejeta, Carlos Navarro and Jorge Sánchez Cabezudo.

The first season consisted of 6 episodes. Before its free-to-air broadcasting, it was released under video-on-demand on the Movistar TV platform on 1 April 2014. The first episode aired in prime time on La 1 on 12 January 2015. Starting with a good 14.5% share of audience, a decline in viewership installed in the third episode. Before the broadcasting of the last episode, the decision for the non-renovation of the series for a second season was reported in media.

However, the series was unexpectedly picked up for a 8-episode second season in order to replace La 1's Águila Roja after the latter series ended for good. New faces such as Paco Tous, Carolina Bang, Paula Prendes or Edu Soto joined the cast of the new season. The new season focused more on indoor locations (reducing the use of digital effects) as well as it lined up a season arch rather than the largely self-contained procedural episodes of the first season. The first episode of the new season aired on La 1 on 3 November 2016, obtaining a "modest" 10,1% share of the audience in prime time. The second season did not obtain better audience results than the first one. The season finale aired on 22 December 2016.

Season	No.	Title	Original date	Viewers (Spain)	Share (%)	Ref.
1	1	El misterio de la Casa Aranda	12 January 2015	2,869,000	14.5	
1	2	El anillo de Rosacruz	19 January 2015	2,647,000	13.2	
1	3	El sueño de la razón	26 January 2015	2,154,000	10.8	
1	4	Ángeles y demonios	2 February 2015	2,141,000	10.7	
1	5	Ladrones de niños	9 February 2015	2,094,000	10.3	
1	6	Las huellas del crimen	16 February 2015	2,149,000	10.6	
1	Season average			2,345,000	11.7	
2	1		3 November 2016	1,631,000	10.1	
2	2		10 November 2016	1,633,000	10.1	
2	3		17 November 2016	1,452,000	9.0	
2	4		24 November 2016	1,551,000	9.8	
2	5		1 December 2016	1,396,000	8.6	
2	6		8 December 2016	1,506,000	9.4	
2	7		15 December 2016	1,592,000	9.7	
2	8		22 December 2016	1,173,000	7.3	
2	Season average			1,492,000	9.3	
