= Just a Little Chemistry =

- Film poster
- Spanish: Solo química
- Directed by: Alfonso Albacete
- Screenplay by: Alfonso Albacete; Mireia Llinás
- Produced by: Mar Targarona; Joaquín Padró
- Starring: Ana Carlota Fernández; Alejo Sauras; Rodrigo Guirao; José Coronado; María Esteve; Bibiana Fernández; Martina Klein; Jaime Olías; Rossy de Palma; Neus Asensi; Silvia Marsó; Natalia de Molina; Miranda Makaroff; Àlex Monner; Esmeralda Moya
- Cinematography: Carles Gusi
- Edited by: Joan Manel Vilaseca
- Music by: Juan Sueiro
- Production company: Rodar y Rodar
- Distributed by: Alfa Pictures
- Release dates: 25 April 2015 (Málaga); 24 July 2015 (Spain)
- Country: Spain
- Language: Spanish

Just a Little Chemistry (Spanish: Solo química) is a 2015 Spanish romantic comedy film directed by Alfonso Albacete in his solo directorial debut which stars Ana Fernández alongside Alejo Sauras and Rodrigo Guirao.

== Plot ==
Perfume shop worker and boxing aficionado Oli falls for film and television star Eric Soto while her friend Carlos, a psychologist, tells her that love does not exist.

== Cast ==
- Ana Carlota Fernández as Oli
- Alejo Sauras as Carlos
- Rodrigo Guirao as Eric Soto
- José Coronado as Julián
- María Esteve as Berta
- Bibiana Fernández as Sabrina
- Martina Klein as Alessandra
- Jaime Olías as Hans
- Rossy de Palma
- Neus Asensi
- Silvia Marsó as Mónica
- Natalia de Molina as Melanie
- Miranda Makaroff
- Àlex Monner
- Esmeralda Moya

== Production ==
The film was produced by Rodar y Rodar with the participation of TVE, Canal+, and TVC. Shooting locations included Barcelona, Sitges, and Costa Brava.

== Release ==
The film screened in a non-competitive slot of the 18th Málaga Film Festival on 25 April 2015. Distributed by Alfa Pictures, it was released theatrically in Spain on 24 July 2015.

== Reception ==
Manuel Piñón of Cinemanía rated the film 1 out of 5 stars, deeming it to be "a romcom in which everything is missing, but above all sanity".

Javier Ocaña of El País compared negatively the film to Sex, Party and Lies (co-directed by Albacete) and wrote that it is a film "during which you pray from your seat that [everything] be a dream or a self-parodic nod".

Beatriz Martínez of Fotogramas rated the film 3 out of 5 stars, highlighting "its expressive liveliness, fearless".

== See also ==
- List of Spanish films of 2015
