= Tierra de lobos =

- Genre: Historical drama; Romance; Adventure; Western
- Created by: Rocío Martínez-Llano; Juan Carlos Cueto
- Country of origin: Spain
- Original language: Spanish
- No. of seasons: 3
- No. of episodes: 42

Production
- Executive producers: Juan Carlos Cueto; Rocío Martínez-Llano
- Production companies: Multipark Ficción; Boomerang TV

Original release
- Network: Telecinco
- Release: 29 September 2010 – 15 January 2014

Tierra de lobos (lit. 'Land of Wolves') is a Spanish television series with elements of historical drama, western, romance, adventure, action, comedy and mystery set in late 19th-century Spain. It originally aired from September 2010 to January 2014 on Telecinco.

== Premise ==
Spain. 1878. After botching a robbery in Portugal, César and Román Bravo (two outlaw brothers) flee from justice and return to the land they were born in to start a new life. But they are rejected by most of the locals, with the exception of Elena.

The powerful and authoritarian local cacique Antonio Lobo (widowed and the father of four sisters: Almudena, Isabel, Nieves and Rosa), attempts to force the Bravo brothers out of the place. But love arises between César and one of Lobo's daughters.

== Cast ==
- Álex García as César Bravo
- Junio Valverde as Román Bravo
- Silvia Alonso as Almudena Lobo
- Adriana Torrebejano as Isabel Lobo
- Dafne Fernández as Nieves Lobo
- Carla Díaz as Rosa Lobo
- Juan Fernández as Antonio Lobo
- Antonio Velázquez as Aníbal Bravo
- María Castro as Elena Valdés
- Berta Hernández as Cristina
- Elisa Mantilla as Lola
- Jordi Rico as Jean Marie Raymond
- Nicolás Coronado as Félix
- Eva Pedraza as Rosario
- Mario Pardo as Damián

Introduced in the second season

- Carolina Bang as Inés
- Sergio Peris-Mencheta as Capitán Ugarte
- José Sospedra as Teniente Ruiz
- Sandra Blázquez as Luz
- Alejandro Albarracín as Álvaro

Introduced in season 3

- Assumpta Serna as Duquesa de Gózquez
- Álex González as Don Joaquín Montes
- Raúl Mérida as Hugo Bravo
- Esmeralda Moya as Victoria Eugenia Montes
- Roberto Álvarez as Fernando Bravo

== Production and release ==
The series' creators, Juan Carlos Cueto and Rocío Martínez-Llano, served as executive producers and screenwriters. Marcelo Pacheco was charged with art direction, Federico Jusid with the score, and Pepe Reyes with costume design.

The series was produced by Multipark Ficción and Boomerang TV for Telecinco. The first episode premiered on Telecinco on 29 September 2010, with roughly 2.6 million viewers and a 15.6% share. The second season was shot in Maderuelo, province of Segovia.

The last episode aired on 15 January 2014, attracting 2,494,000 viewers (13.1% share).

The broadcasting rights for the Americas were purchased by Direct TV whereas Mediaset Italia held the rights in Italy. The lesbian romance between Isabel Lobo and Cristina was censored in the Italian airing on Mediaset's Rete4.

Series	Episodes	Originally released		Average viewership	Share (%)	Ref.
Series	Episodes	First released	Last released	Average viewership	Share (%)	Ref.
1	13	29 September 2010	28 December 2010	2,840,000	15.9	
2	13	28 September 2011	21 December 2011	2,934,000	15.7	
3	16	17 September 2013	15 January 2014	2,093,000	12.2	

=== Season 1 ===
This is a caption
No. overall	No. in season	Title	Viewers	Original release date	Share (%)
1	1	"En busca de un nuevo comienzo"	2,626,000	29 September 2010	15.6
2	2	"Un pozo para morir"	2,767,000	6 October 2010	15.8
3	3	"Hasta la última gota"	2,404,000	13 October 2010	13.1
4	4	"Luna llena"	2,077,000	20 October 2010	15.9
5	5	"El descubrimiento de Almudena"	2,764,000	2 November 2010	15.4
6	6	"Anselmo está arruinado"	2,791,000	9 November 2010	15.0
7	7	"Al amanecer"	2,940,000	16 November 2010	16.0
8	8	"Se busca"	3,109,000	23 November 2010	16.6
9	9	"Huida"	3,220,000	30 November 2010	16.7
10	10	"La feria"	2,668,000	7 December 2010	14.7
11	11	"La quebrada"	3,060,000	14 December 2010	16.5
12	12	"El penal de la torre"	3,165,000	21 December 2010	17.2
13	13	"Sí, quiero"	3,358,000	28 December 2010	18.0

=== Season 2 ===
This is a caption
No. overall	No. in season	Title	Viewers	Original release date	Share (%)
14	1	"Yo te maldigo"	2,783,000	28 September 2011	15.7
15	2	"Pueblo tomado"	2,790,000	5 October 2011	15.3
16	3	"Quiero verte sufrir"	2,588,000	12 October 2011	15.6
17	4	"Traición"	2,808,000	19 October 2011	15.0
18	5	"La leyenda de las 3 llaves"	3,029,000	26 October 2011	15.6
19	6	"Como hermanos"	3,003,000	2 November 2011	15.9
20	7	"El túnel"	2,856,000	9 November 2011	15.3
21	8	"Tierra quemada"	3,093,000	16 November 2011	16.1
22	9	"Quebrantahuesos"	3,002,000	23 November 2011	15.5
23	10	"Forajidos"	2,931,000	30 November 2011	14.9
24	11	"La misma sangre"	2,803,000	7 December 2011	15.0
25	12	"La viuda"	3,174,000	14 December 2011	16.8
26	13	"Una promesa cumplida"	3,284,000	21 December 2011	17.0

=== Season 3 ===
This is a caption
No. overall	No. in season	Title	Viewers	Original release date	Share (%)
27	1	"Fernando Bravo"	1,905,000	17 September 2013	11.6
28	2	"Vuelta a casa"	1,941,000	24 September 2013	11.6
29	3	"Polvo al polvo"	2,108,000	1 October 2013	11.7
30	4	"Hermanos de sangre"	2,001,000	8 October 2013	12.5
31	5	"La maldición de los Lobo"	2,288,000	15 October 2013	14.0
32	6	"El intercambio"	2,042,000	22 October 2013	11.2
33	7	"Fuego"	2,208,000	29 October 2013	14.0
34	8	"El visitante"	2,097,000	5 November 2013	13.1
35	9	"Una elección difícil"	2,065,000	19 November 2013	11.8
36	10	"Máscaras"	2,003,000	26 November 2013	11.8
37	11	"La señora de la casa"	2,150,000	3 December 2013	13.1
38	12	"Un camino hacia el fin"	2,095,000	10 December 2013	12.4
39	13	"La venganza del pueblo"	2,122,000	17 December 2013	12.4
40	14	"El regreso"	1,931,000	7 January 2014	10.9
41	15	"El testamento"	2,041,000	14 January 2014	10.6
42	16	"Tierra de héroes"	2,494,000	15 January 2014	13.1
