= Antonio Garrido =

Antonio Garrido may refer to:

- Antonio Garrido (golfer) (born 1944), Spanish golfer
- Antonio Garrido (actor) (born 1971), Spanish actor and TV presenter
- António Garrido (referee) (1932–2014), Portuguese football referee
