= HH6 =

HH6 or HH-6 may refer to:

- Honor Among Enemies, the sixth novel in the Honor Harrington series by David Weber, abbreviated HH6
- Fibroblast growth factor 8 (HH6)
- HH6, one of the Hamburger–Hamilton stages in chick development
- FWD HH6, an interwar U.S. military truck; see list of military trucks
- HH6, a model in the series of Honda Acty trucks

== See also ==
- H6 (disambiguation)
