= La bandera =

- Theatrical release poster
- Directed by: Martín Cuervo
- Screenplay by: Guillem Clua
- Based on: Al damunt dels nostres cants by Guillem Clua
- Produced by: Eduardo Campoy; Adolfo Blanco; Raúl Berdonés; Pablo Jimeno
- Starring: Imanol Arias; Miquel Fernández; Aitor Luna; Ana Fernández; Antón Lofer
- Cinematography: Pablo Bürmann
- Edited by: Lucía Palicio
- Music by: Iván Valdés
- Production companies: Secuoya Studios; Álamo Producciones Audiovisuales; A Contracorriente Films
- Distributed by: A Contracorriente Films
- Release dates: 7 March 2024 (Málaga); 14 June 2024 (Spain)
- Country: Spain
- Language: Spanish

La bandera (transl. 'The Flag') is a 2024 Spanish comedy-drama film directed by Martín Cuervo from a screenplay by Guillem Clua based on Clua's play Al damunt dels nostres cants. It stars Imanol Arias, Ana Fernández, Miquel Fernández, and Aitor Luna.

== Plot ==
Aging Tomás (accompanied by biographer Lina) summons his two children Jesús and Antonio, who vie for the hypothetical inheritance. As the siblings find out a huge flag erected on the garden, family strife ensues.

== Cast ==
- Imanol Arias as Tomás
- Miquel Fernández as Jesús
- Aitor Luna as Antonio
- Ana Fernández as Lina

== Production ==
The project was originally set to be directed by Guillermo Ríos, but Hugo Martín Cuervo eventually took over direction duties. The film is a Secuoya Studios, Álamo Producciones Audiovisuales, and A Contracorriente Films production. It was shot in Tenerife.

== Release ==
The film was presented in a non-competitive slot of the 27th Málaga Film Festival on 7 March 2024. Distributed by A Contracorriente Films, it is scheduled to be released theatrically in Spain on 14 June 2024.

== Reception ==
Jordi Batlle Caminal of Fotogramas rated the film 3 out of 5 stars, highlighting the "brilliant" meanness in the dialogues as the best thing about the film, while negatively citing the non-credible and annoying sentimentality pertaining the denouement.

Nuria Vidal of Cinemanía rated the film 2 out of 5 stars, underscoring it to be a "very conventional theatrical comedy that [only] works because of the actors" in the verdict.

== See also ==
- List of Spanish films of 2024
