= 90-60-90, diario secreto de una adolescente =

Spanish television series

- Genre: Drama
- Written by: David Castillo; Pau Sieiro; Guillem Clua; Xavier Guardia
- Directed by: Joan Noguera
- Starring: Esmeralda Moya; Jesús Olmedo; Ana Rujas; Assumpta Serna
- Country of origin: Spain
- Original language: Spanish
- No. of seasons: 1
- No. of episodes: 16

Production
- Production company: Diagonal TV

Original release
- Network: Antena 3
- Release: 7 September – 26 October 2009

90-60-90, diario secreto de una adolescente is a Spanish drama television series that originally aired on Antena 3 from 7 September to 26 October 2009. Set in the fashion world, the plot concerns the relationship between a 42-year-old photographer and a 16-year-old orphan. It stars Esmeralda Moya, Jesús Olmedo, Ana Rujas, and Assumpta Serna, among others.

== Premise ==
Mel, a 16-year-old girl with a younger sister (Julia), becomes an orphan and thus seeks a job. Together with her friend África, Mel approaches a fashion agency. She enters into a relationship with Bruno, a 42-year-old photographer with a daughter the same age as her.

== Cast ==
- Esmeralda Moya as Mel.
- Jesús Olmedo as Bruno.
- Ana Rujas as África.
- Assumpta Serna as Chantal.
- Eduardo Velasco como Abe.
- Isak Férriz as Doménico.
- Pablo Penedo as Lauro.
- Alex Adrover as Alberto.
- Fanny Gautier as Carmen.
- Nadia de Santiago as Luz.
- Nerea Garmendia as Silvia.
- Carla Campra as Julia.
- Marta Marco as Norma.
- Adrián Marín as Dani.
- Jordi Ballester as Luigi.
- Carmen Arévalo as Paloma.

== Production and release ==
Produced by Diagonal TV for Antena 3, and written by David Castillo, Pau Sieiro, Guillem Clua and Xavier Guardia, the series was directed by Joan Noguera. Despite actually consisting of 16 episodes featuring a running time of 55 minutes, 90-60-90 was broadcast in double-rounds. The broadcasting run lasted from 7 September 2009 to 26 October 2009.

== Awards and nominations ==
| Year | Award | Category | Nominee(s) | Result | Ref. |
|---|---|---|---|---|---|
| 2010 | 19th Actors and Actresses Union Awards | Best Actress (TV, Minor Performance) | Carmen Arévalo | Nominated | |
