= 14 de abril. La República =

Spanish period drama television series

- Genre: Period drama
- Created by: Virginia Yagüe; Jordi Frades
- Starring: Félix Gómez; Verónica Sánchez; Mariona Ribas; Alejo Sauras
- Country of origin: Spain
- Original language: Spanish
- No. of seasons: 2
- No. of episodes: 30

Production
- Production companies: RTVE; Diagonal TV

Original release
- Network: La 1
- Release: 24 January 2011 – 27 January 2019

Related
- La señora

14 de abril. La República (lit. '14 April. The Republic') is a Spanish period drama television series. Set in the Second Spanish Republic, it is a spin-off of La señora, featuring a number of characters from the latter show. Produced by RTVE in collaboration with Diagonal TV and created by Virginia Yagüe and Jordi Frades, the first season aired on La 1 in 2011. The already produced second season was put in the freeze during the seven years of rule of the People's Party, eventually airing from 2018 to 2019.

== Premise ==
The fiction starts with Ludi, a female servant, arriving to Madrid from Asturias. In the context of the proclamation of the Second Spanish Republic on 14 April 1931, the Spring of 1931 in the Spanish capital is bustling with those celebrating the advent of the Republic, while those against it prepare for armed struggle. The "De la Torre" family, a landowning family representative of the "stagnant, rancid bourgeoisie", is among those opposing the new government. The son of the family, Fernando de la Torre (Félix Gómez) is engaged to Mercedes León (Mariona Ribas). The members of the lower class "Prado" family work as rangers of the large estate owned by the De la Torre, showing feelings of submission towards their employers conflicted by their endorsement to the promises of agrarian reform brought by the Republic. The offspring of the Prado family are Jesús (Alejo Sauras) and Alejandra (Verónica Sánchez). The extremes of the ideological polarization in play are represented by characters such as Hugo de Viana (Raul Peña), a military officer opposing the Republic and Encarna (Lucía Jiménez), a strong Socialist woman.

The series features a number of characters from La señora such as Encarna, Ventura and Hugo de Viana, played by the same performers.

== Cast ==
- Félix Gómez as Fernando de la Torre.
- Alejo Sauras as Jesús Prado.
- Mariona Ribas as Mercedes León.
- Verónica Sánchez as Alejandra Prado.
- Héctor Colomé as Agustín de la Torre.
- Cristina de Inza as Leocadia.
- Úrsula Corberó as Beatriz de La Torre.
- Álex Angulo as Antonio Prado.
- Marta Belaustegui as Amparo Romero.
- Vicente Romero as Paco El Rubio.
- Guillermo Ortega as Rafael Mesa.
- Ana Villa as María Pilar.
- Lucía Jiménez as Encarna.
- Fernando Cayo as Ventura.
- Raúl Peña as Hugo de Viana.
- Carolina Lapausa as Isabel.
- Mónica Vedia as Ludi.
- Víctor Clavijo as Fernando Alcázar.

Introduced in season 2

- Sergio Mur as León.
- Elio González as Alfonso.
- María Cotiello as Nieves.
- Biel Durán as Meteo.

== Production and release ==
Created by Virginia Yagüe and Jordi Frades, the first season started filming in October 2010. It premiered on 24 January 2011. The series subsequently received harsh criticism from the People's Party (PP), then the main opposition party. The 13-episode season ended on 18 April 2011 with good viewer ratings (18.2% share) and a cliffhanger.

The second season was produced by Endemol TV. Slated to air in 2012, the second season of the series was shelved indefinitely because of the arrival of Mariano Rajoy and the PP to government, as they preferred to bury a fiction set in the Republican period. Seven years after, in 2018, only once Pedro Sánchez became prime minister, the airing of the second season was programmed again. In the meantime two of the main cast actors (Héctor Colomé and Álex Angulo) had died. The opening episode of the second season premiered on 3 November 2018 in prime time. The broadcasting run was irregular, to the point the channel sometimes scheduled back-to-back two episodes.

Mired with problems and low viewership ratings, the series ended with the back-to-back broadcasting of the last two episodes aired on 26–27 January 2019.

| Series | Episodes | Originally released | | Average viewership | Share (%) | Ref. |
| Series | Episodes | First released | Last released | Average viewership | Share (%) | Ref. |
|---|---|---|---|---|---|---|
| 1 | 13 | 24 January 2011 | 18 April 2011 | 3,515,000 | 17.0 | |
| 2 | 17 | 3 November 2018 | 26 January 2019 | 939,000 | 6.4 | |

=== Season 1 ===
This is a caption
| No. overall | No. in season | Title | Viewers | Original release date | Share (%) |
|---|---|---|---|---|---|
| 1 | 1 | "La decisión" | 4,020,000 | 24 January 2011 | 19.2 |
| 2 | 2 | "El precio del crédito" | 3,679,000 | 31 January 2011 | 17.4 |
| 3 | 3 | "Revoluciones" | 3,413,000 | 7 February 2011 | 16.5 |
| 4 | 4 | "Tiempo de cambios" | 3,370,000 | 14 February 2011 | 16.3 |
| 5 | 5 | "Lo inevitable" | 3,605,000 | 21 February 2011 | 17.5 |
| 6 | 6 | "La senda de los secretos" | 3,518,000 | 28 February 2011 | 17.0 |
| 7 | 7 | "Un tema íntimo y personal" | 3,282,000 | 7 March 2011 | 15.9 |
| 8 | 8 | "El animal interior" | 3,388,000 | 14 March 2011 | 16.6 |
| 9 | 9 | "Hermanos. Enemigos" | 3,423,000 | 21 March 2011 | 16.7 |
| 10 | 10 | "Intento frustrado" | 3,634,000 | 28 March 2011 | 17.2 |
| 11 | 11 | "Soledades, búsquedas y otras pequeñas salvaciones" | 3,400,000 | 4 April 2011 | 16.4 |
| 12 | 12 | "Encrucijadas ventajosas" | 3,457,000 | 11 April 2011 | 16.8 |
| 13 | 13 | "Quien siembra vientos…" | 3,514,000 | 18 April 2011 | 18.2 |

=== Season 2 ===
| No. overall | No. in season | Title | Original release date |
|---|---|---|---|
| 14 | 1 | "Promesas" | 3 November 2018 |
| 15 | 2 | "La última noche" | 10 November 2018 |
| 16 | 3 | "Vivir sin ti" | 17 November 2018 |
| 17 | 4 | "Lobos" | 24 November 2018 |
| 18 | 5 | "Decisiones" | 1 December 2018 |
| 19 | 6 | "Ascenso y caída" | 8 December 2018 |
| 20 | 7 | "Ojo por ojo" | 15 December 2018 |
| 21 | 8 | "Ni Dios ni amo" | 15 December 2018 |
| 22 | 9 | "Revolución" | 22 December 2018 |
| 23 | 10 | "Secretos" | 22 December 2018 |
| 24 | 11 | "Al amanecer" | 29 December 2018 |
| 25 | 12 | "Vergüenzas" | 29 December 2018 |
| 26 | 13 | "Temores" | 5 January 2019 |
| 27 | 14 | "Grandes esperanzas" | 19 January 2019 |
| 28 | 15 | "Hacia una vida nueva" | 19 January 2019 |
| 29 | 16 | "Culpables" | 26 January 2019 |
| 30 | 17 | "Palabras contra pistolas" | 26 January 2019 |
