= Hay alguien ahí =

Spanish television series

- Genre: Horror; Supernatural
- Created by: Joaquín Górriz; D. C. Torallas; Miguel Ángel Fernández
- Country of origin: Spain
- Original language: Spanish
- No. of seasons: 2
- No. of episodes: 26

Production
- Production company: Plural Entertainment

Original release
- Network: Cuatro
- Release: 16 March 2009 – 9 April 2010

Hay alguien ahí is a Spanish horror television series created by Joaquín Górriz, D. C. Torallas and Miguel Ángel Fernández. Produced by Plural Entertainment, it aired from 2009 to 2010 on Cuatro.

== Premise ==
The drivers of the story are the Pardo, a bourgeois family. Undergoing a marriage crisis, the parents of the family decide to move with their children into a new house located in an apparently ideal residential area, "La Roseta". Yet both the house and the residential area turned to be the settings for their nightmares.

== Cast ==
- Eduard Farelo as Diego Pardo, the father of the Pardo family, a pilot.
- Sonia Castelo as Clara Simón, the mother of the Pardo family, co-owner of an antique shop.
- María Cotiello as Irene Pardo, the elder daughter of the Pardo family; she studies Fine Arts.
- Guillermo Barrientos as Íñigo Pardo, the son of the Pardo family; he studies Business Sciences.
- Mónica Rodríguez as Ana Pardo, the youngest member of the Pardo family; she has an "invisible friend".
- Marina Salas as Silvia Latiegui, Íñigo's girlfriend.
- William Miller as Jorge Selvas, a medium.
- Agnes Kiraly as Nikoletta Blaskó, servant working for the Pardo Simón family.
- Esmeralda Moya as Amanda Ríos.
- Chisco Amado as Luis Latiegui, Silvia's father.
- Bárbara de Lema as Nieves Bruc, Silvia's mother.
- Jordi Dauder as Celestino Poveda.
- Mercedes Sampietro as Begoña García-Inés, Diego's mother.
- Montse Mostaza as Rebeca Santos, Diego's work colleague.
- Carlos Bardem as Justo.
- Velilla Valbuena as Marta Simón, Clara's sister.
- Laura Aparicio as Ruth Berlín, police inspector.
- José Ángel Egido as Profesor Sánchez Albo, professor of psychology, expert in hypnosis.
- Jesús Castejón as Padre Palazuelos, spiritual advisor to Begoña.
- Jan Cornet as Fausto Ladera, Silvia's friend.

== Production and release ==
Produced by Plural Entertainment, the series was created by Joaquín Górriz, D. C. Torallas and Miguel Ángel Fernández. Shooting took place in Villafranca del Castillo. The first season, consisting of 13 episodes, premiered on 16 March 2009. The last episode of the season aired on 8 June 2009. The second season began airing on 19 January 2010. After 2 seasons and 26 episodes, the broadcasting run ended on 9 April 2010.

Series	Episodes	Originally released		Average viewership	Share (%)	Ref.
Series	Episodes	First released	Last released	Average viewership	Share (%)	Ref.
1	13	16 March 2009	8 June 2009	1,818,000	10.3	
2	13	19 January 2010	9 April 2010	712,167	6.0	
