= María Cotiello =

Spanish actress (born 1982)

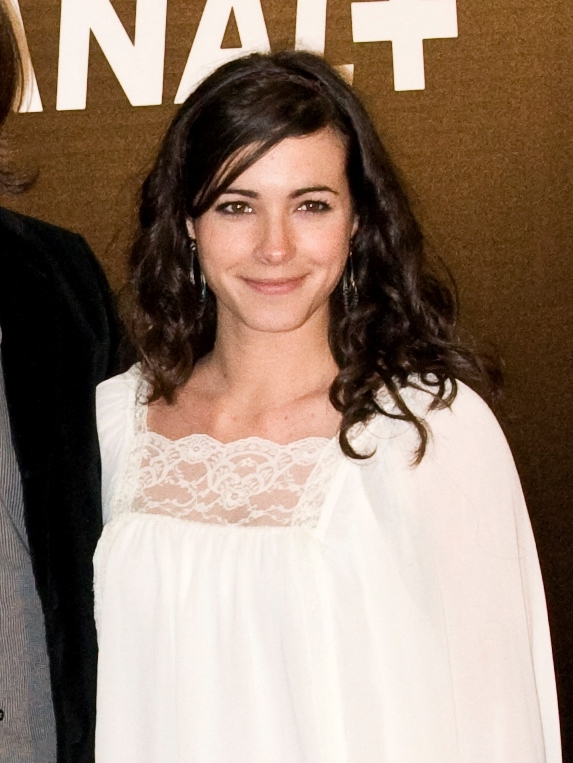
- (2010)
- Born: María Cotiello Pérez; 21 November 1982 (age 43); Mieres or Gijón, Asturias, Spain
- Occupations: Actress, activist

María Cotiello Pérez (born 21 November 1982) is a Spanish actress. She is also a visible campaigner for the officialization of the Asturian language in Asturias.

== Biography ==
María Cotiello Pérez was born on 21 November 1982 either in Mieres or Gijón, depending on sources. She began to perform as an actress when she was 15 years old, moving to Madrid in 2001 to train at the Real Escuela Superior de Arte Dramático (RESAD). She starred in the feature film 13 Roses playing one of the 13 roses, Elena. She performed in multiple television series, including, SMS, sin miedo a soñar, Amar en tiempos revueltos, Ascensores, Hay alguien ahí, Los Protegidos, Centro médico, El ministerio del tiempo, Bajo sospecha, Bandolera, 14 de abril. La República, and stage plays such as La danza de la muerte, Dios de Woddy Allen and Presas.

Also graduated in Spanish Language (specialisation in Asturian), Cotiello is also a visible campaigner for the officialization of the Asturian language in Asturias.

== Filmography ==
Film

Year	Title	Role	Notes	Ref
2007	Las 13 rosas (13 Roses)	Elena		
2008	Almas perdidas	Hija Mayor	Short	
2009	Cielo rojo al amanecer	Hermana Chico Joven	Short	
2010	Un poema	Novia	Short	
2010	Septiembre	Madre	Short	
2011	Madrid, 1987			
2012	Tan antiguo como el mundo	Narrador		
2014	Objetos perdidos	Laura	Short	
2017	Como la espuma	Marta		
2017	Agostu		Short	
2023	Infiesto	Pilar		

Television

Year	Title	Role	Notes	Ref
2006	Estudio 1	Elena	Episode: "Alesio"	
2006–2007	SMS: Sin Miedo a Soñar	Eva	76 episodes	
2007–2009	Amar en tiempos revueltos	Matilde Roldán	186 episodes	
2009–2010	Hay alguien ahí	Irene Pardo	26 episodes	
2010–2012	Los protegidos	Nuria	15 episodes	
2012	Bandolera	Sofía Serrano	41 episodes	
2014–2015	Bajo sospecha	Begoña	8 episodes	
2015	El ministerio del tiempo	Nuria Celaya	Episode: "Tiempo de venganza"	
2015	Hospital Real		2 episodes	
2016–2017	Seis hermanas	Soledad Guzmán / Úrsula	25 episodes	
2018	Serramoura		Episode: "Conto de pantasmas"	
2018–2019	Centro médico	Dr. Beatriz Reina	11 episodes	
2018–2019	14 de abril. La República	Nieves	Season 2; 5 episodes; filmed in 2011	
2021	El Cid	María, madre del Ruy	3 episodes	
2022	Tus monstruos		Episode: "La reválida"	
