= Luis Piedrahita =

Spanish artist (born 1977)

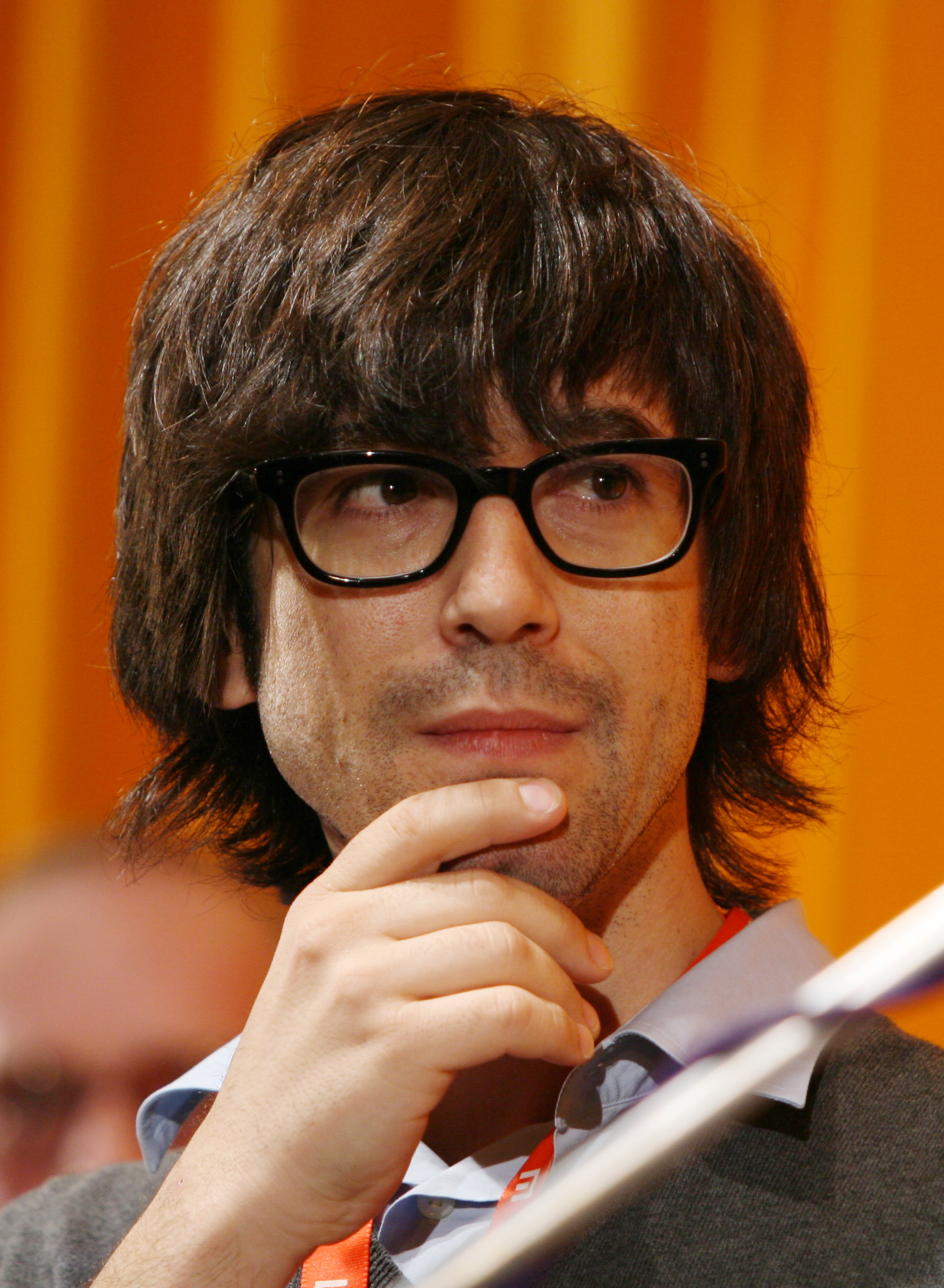
- Piedrahíta in 2008
- Born: Luis Piedrahíta Cuesta; 19 February 1977 (age 49); A Coruña, Galicia, Spain
- Other name: El rey de las cosas pequeñas (The King of little things)
- Education: University of Navarra
- Occupations: Comedian; magician; screenwriter; film director
- Website: www.luispiedrahita.com

Luis Piedrahita Cuesta (born 1977) is a Spanish stand-up comedian, magician, script writer, broadcaster and author. He is known as "El Rey de las Cosas Pequeñas" ("The King of Small Things"), due to his monologues in which he critiques the lack of regard of everyday things such as toilet lids, carnivorous plants, etc.

== Early life and education ==
He was born in A Coruña, Spain on February 19, 1977. Although his mother's family is from Pego, he went to school at "Santa María del Mar", of the Jesuits. Luis also went to the Adormideras school for a short period of time. He became a magic fanatic at a very young age and won several prizes. In 1998, he won second place in the magic contest at the congress of MagicValongo in Portugal. A year later, he was named the Magic Champion of Spain. Luis Piedrahita also won the First Contest of Monologues on the TV Spanish television show "The Comedy Club." After that, he became a script writer and actor on the show.

Luis Piedrahita studied Audiovisual Communications at the University of Navarra and specialized in script writing. After graduating, he was hired by Telecinco (one of the largest TV networks of Spain). In September 2008 he had his gallbladder removed and auctioned it off on the popular television show El Hormiguero. The profits were donated to the children affected by the West Syndrome.

== Career ==
He became widely known as scriptwriter in three seasons of the Spanish TV program El Club de la Comedia (The Comedy Club). In addition to working on the series Partners in Crime for Columbia Tri Star Pictures in Los Angeles, US, he occasionally collaborates in the Spanish TV program El Hormiguero. He has published two books: Un cacahuete flotando en una piscina ("A peanut floating in a swimming pool", 2005) and ¿Cada cuánto hay que echar a lavar un pijama? ("How often should you wash your pyjamas?", 2006)

In 1999 he won the Spanish Premio Nacional de Magia (National Magic Award).

He co-directed and co-wrote the 2007 thriller La habitación de Fermat, later released internationally as Fermat's Room.

He has been collaborating with his writing partner Rodrigo Sopeña for more than 12 years, since they went together to the university. They wrote a script for an animation Spanish studio Ilion Animation Studios and their next project will be Golpe de efecto, a heist movie "with no guns".

In 2016 he won an Academy of the Magical Arts Award.

== Bibliography ==
- Piedrahita, Luis (2005). Un cacahuete flotando en una piscina. ISBN 84-03-09646-1.
- Piedrahita, Luis (2006). ¿Cada cuánto hay que echar a lavar un pijama?. ISBN 84-03-09736-0.
- Piedrahita, Luis (2007). Dios hizo el mundo en siete días... y se nota. ISBN 978-84-03-09859-6.
- Piedrahita, Luis (2010). Diario de una pulga. ISBN 978-84-670-3260-4.
