= Elena Ballesteros =

Spanish actress

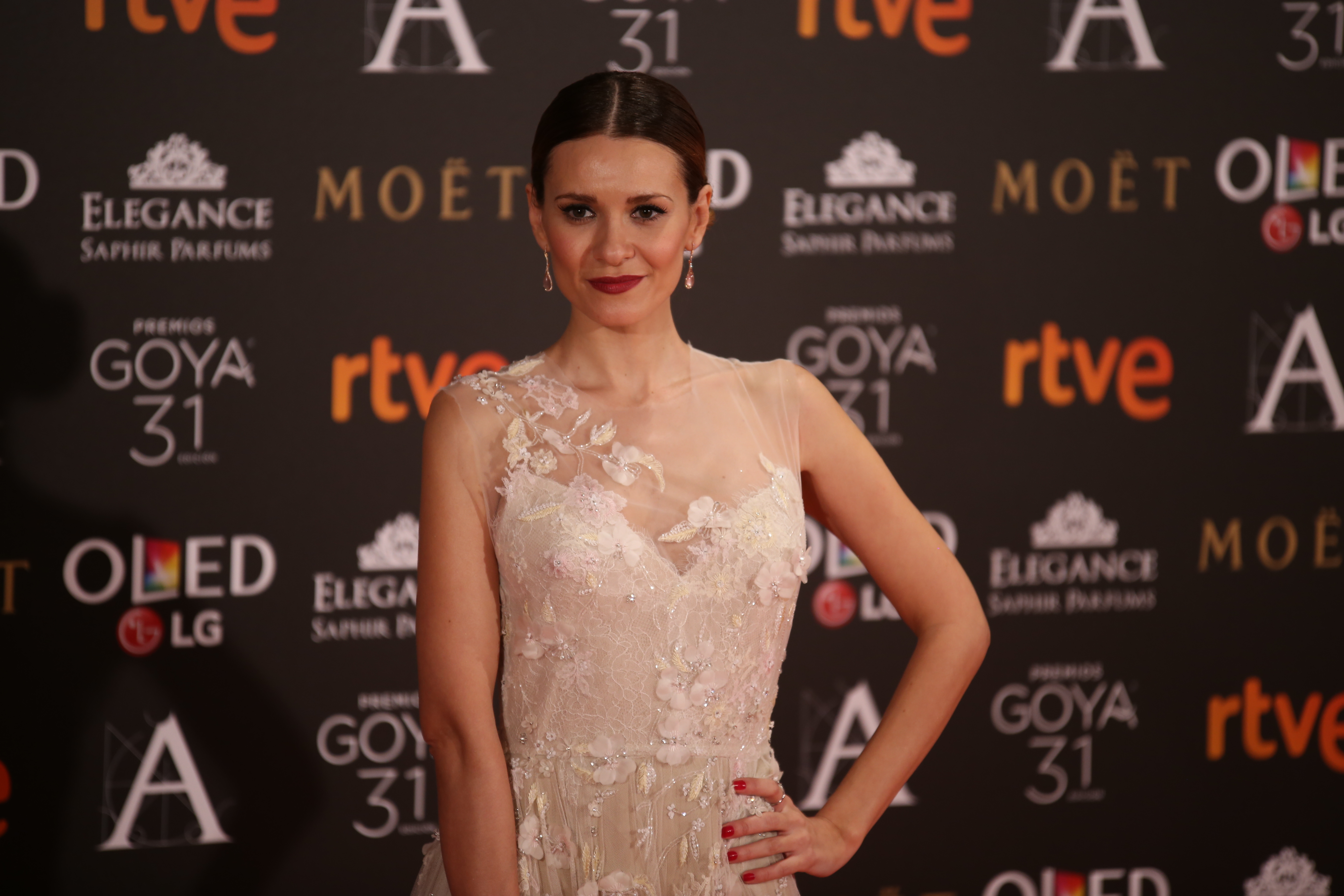
- Born: María Elena Ballesteros Triguero; 6 July 1981 (age 45)
- Occupation: actress
- Spouse(s): Paco Marin 1999 to 2006 Dani Mateo (m. 2010; div. 2016)

María Elena Ballesteros Triguero (born 6 July 1981) is a Spanish actress.

== Biography ==
Ballesteros began her career doing commercials while going to castings to achieve her dream of becoming an actress. Her first opportunity arrived with the role of Lola in the TV series More than friends in 1996.She worked with Paz Vega, Melani Olivares and Alberto San Juan, among others. At the same time, she hosted the children's program Club Disney.

Afterwards she was in the TV series Journalists, in which she played José Topped's daughter. This role made her famous and opened the doors of cinema. Since then, she has worked with directors like Manuel Iborra, Gerardo Smith, Mariano Barroso and Roger Young. She stood out in Álvaro Díaz Lorenzo's Coffee Alone or with Them, one of the more popular Spanish films of 2007. She was also in Fermat's Room which had a big international cast. In 2009, she filmed in Buenos Aires for the film All and sundry with director Manolo González, whose screenplay was rewarded by the ASGAE.

She went back to work in television, starring in the comedy-musical Paco and Veva with Hugo Silva, Table for five and an intrigue series called Personal Reasons. In the summer of 2007, she began the shooting under Antenna 3, broadcasting with the title The Family Kills, in which she had a lead role with the actor Daniel Guzmán. In July 2011, she premièred in the series Scarlet Tip on Telecinco.

Since June 2011 she has written a personal blog on Fotogramas called "Now I think ...".

== Personal life ==
She has a daughter named Jimena from her relationship with actor Paco Marín. She married comic Dani Mateo on 23 July 2010 whom she met during the shooting of The Family Kills. In July 2016, the couple announced their divorce.

== Filmography ==
Films
| Year | Title | Character | Notes |
|---|---|---|---|
| 2000 | Kasbah | Laura | Secondary |
| 2001 | Clara and Elena | Elena (Teenager) | Secondary |
| 2002 | The place where was the paradise | Ana | Protagonist |
| 2003 | Imperium: Augustus | Octavia | Film of television |
| 2004 | A year in The Moon | Sonia | Protagonist |
| 2006 | The Dreyer Cycle | Elena | Protagonist |
| 2007 | Café solo o con ellas | Alma | Protagonist |
| 2007 | Fermat's Room | Oliva | Protagonist |
| 2008 | K-117 | Chica of Red | Short film |
| 2009 | The just moment | Suck | Short film |
| 2010 | All and sundry | Sandra | Protagonist |
| 2011 | The contrary to the love | Sandra | Secondary |
| 2013 | As all the mornings | Lucía | Protagonist |
| 2015 | Reverso | Marta | Protagonist |
Television series
| Year | Title | Character | Notes |
| 1997–1998 | More than friends | Lola | 21 episodes |
| 1998–2002 | Journalists | Isabel Sanz | 82 episodes |
| 2004 | Paco and Veva | Veva | 18 episodes |
| 2005 | Personal reasons | Silvia Durán | 15 episodes |
| 2005 | Seven lives | Olivia | 1 episode |
| 2006 | Table for five | Cristina | 7 episodes |
| 2007–2009 | The family Kills | Susana Kills | 36 episodes |
| 2011 | Scarlet tip | Eva Jiménez | 9 episodes |
| 2013 | Cuéntame un cuento | Elena | 1 episode |
| 2013 | Fragile | Olga | 1 episode |
| 2014 | The mysteries of Laura | Nuria | 1 episode |
| 2014 | Blind to appointments | Rebeca of the Tower | 25 episodes |
| 2015 | B&b, de boca en boca | Maite | 3 episodes |
| 2016 | Apaches | Cris | Main cast |
Television programs
| Year | Title | Channel | Notes |
| 1996–1997 | Club Disney | TVE | Presenter/host |

== Radio ==
- Which disgust of summer (2014) with Dani Mateo in the Chain BE.
- At present collaborator of " The Dovecot" ( Oh My LOL) in the Chain Be
