= 6H =

6H or 6-H can refer to:

- IATA code for Israir Airlines
- Curtiss JN-6H
- JN-6H Jenny; see Curtiss JN-4
- Isuzu 6H Engine
- 6H-SiC, one of the Polymorphs of silicon carbide
- Hydrogen-6 (^{6}H), an isotope of hydrogen
- 6H, the production code for the 1983 Doctor Who serial Enlightenment

== See also ==
- H6 (disambiguation)
