= Mariona Ribas =

Spanish actress (born 1984)

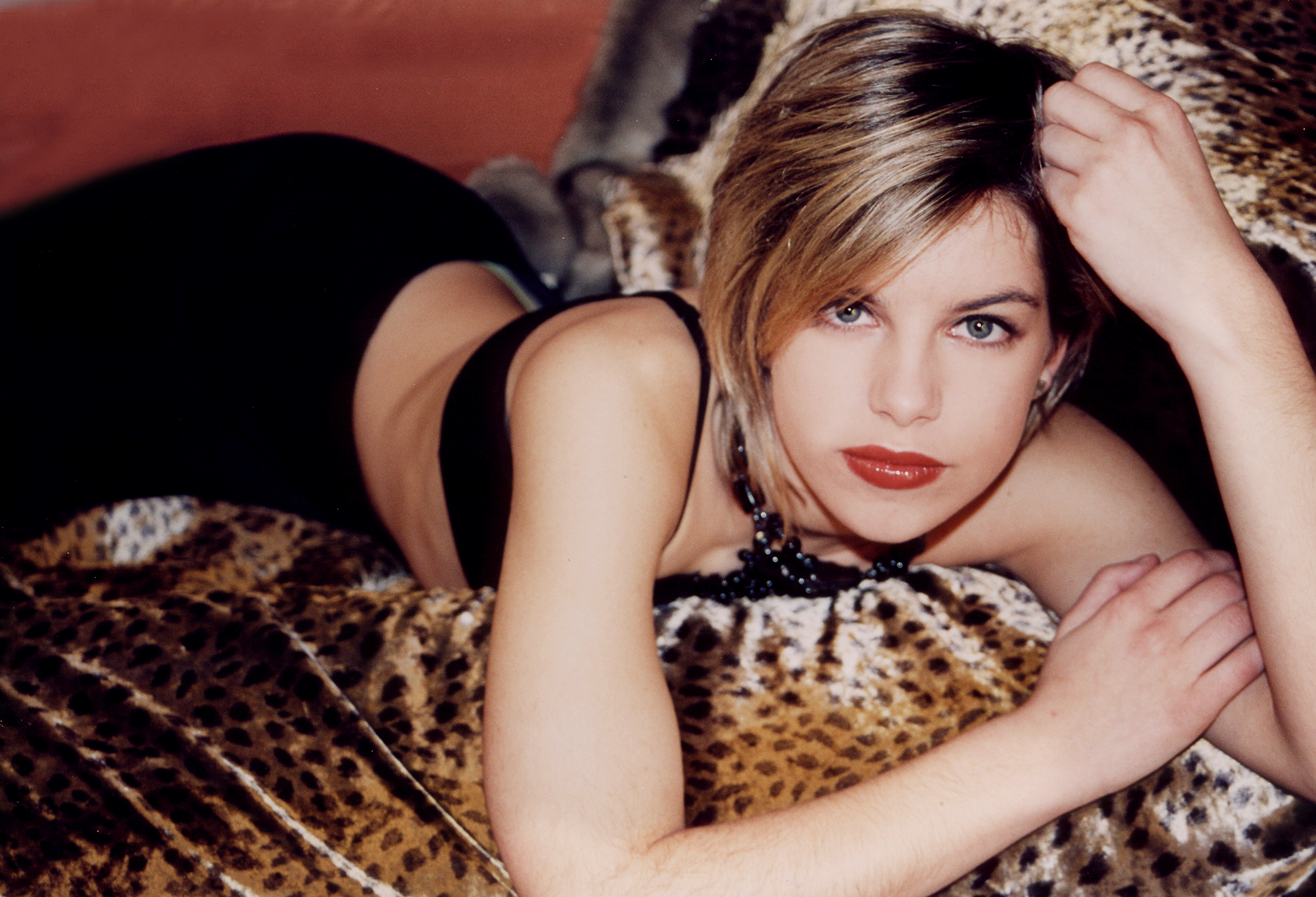
- Ribas in 2004
- Born: Mariona Ribas i Deu; 18 June 1984 (age 41); Sabadell (Barcelona), Spain

Mariona Ribas i Deu (born 18 June 1984 in Sabadell, Catalonia) is a Spanish actress.

Ribas received a musical education and studied dance and acting before her debut on television at the age of 15. On the stage, Ribas made her debut with a starring role in Manuel Veiga's Tempesta de neu at Sala Muntaner, Barcelona, in 2003. Ribas also had a leading role in Ja en tinc 30!, in 2004. She has also played a role in Jugando con Molière (2005–2006) and El poema de Nadal (2007).

Ribas is a well-known face in her native Catalonia due to the popularity of the long-running Catalan soap opera El Cor de la Ciutat, where she starred as Marta, specially during the first 5 seasons.

== Filmography ==
Year	Title	Role
2013	Mario Conde. Los días de gloria	Lourdes Arroyo
2011	14 de abril. La República	Mercedes León
2008	El Internado (TV Series)	Nora
2007	Gominolas (TV Series)	Noelia
2007	M.I.R. (TV Series)	Paz Escandón
2006	Amistades peligrosas (TV Series)	Amanda
2005	Hospital central (TV Series)	Ana
2005	Más que hermanos (TV)	Marta
2005	Gemidos	
2000–2009	El cor de la ciutat (TV Series)	Marta Vendrell
