= Martina Klein =

Argentine-Spanish model and television presenter

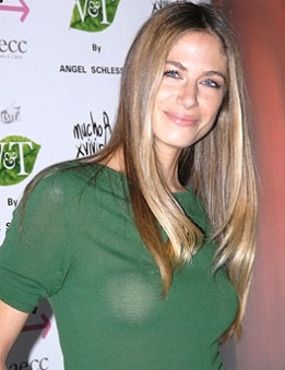
- Born: December 7, 1976 (age 49); Buenos Aires, Argentina
- Occupations: Model; TV presenter Comedian
- Spouse: Àlex Corretja

Martina Klein Korin (born Buenos Aires, December 7, 1976) is an Argentine-Spanish model, TV presenter and comedian.

== Early life ==
Klein was born in Argentina. Her family moved to Barcelona when she was 12.

== Career ==
At age 15, Klein began her modeling career in Spain. Klein appeared in the fashion events: Milan Fashion Week, Paris Fashion Week, Cibeles Madrid Fashion Week, New York Fashion Week. She appeared in advertising campaigns for brands such as Yves Rocher, El Corte Inglés, Trident, Mango, Wella, Pronovias, Don Algodón and fashion magazines (Cosmopolitan, Elle and Marie Claire).

== Personal life ==
Klein had a relationship with Spanish singer Álex de la Nuez (1999-2008), with whom she had a son in 2005. Klein had a daughter with Spanish tennis player Àlex Corretja in 2017.

== Filmography ==
=== Films ===
- 2002 Raíces de sangre
- 2011 Red Eagle (original title Águila Roja: la película - as Beatriz.
- 2015 Solo química

=== Videoclips ===
- Si tú no vuelves, Miguel Bosé, 1998

=== TV ===
- Les mil i una, 1998-1999
- Las Mañanas de Cuatro, 2006-2007
- Planeta Finito, 2007
- Celebritis, 2008
- El club del chiste, 2010-2011
- ADN MAX, 2015
