= H6 =

H6, H06, or H-6 may refer to:

== Science ==
- British NVC community H6, an ecological designation
- Sanguiin H-6, a dimeric ellagitannin found in Sanguisorba officinalis, the great burnet
- Hydrogen-6 (H-6 or ^{6}H), an isotope of hydrogen

== Transportation ==
=== Aircraft ===
- Hughes OH-6 Cayuse, a 1963 American scout helicopter
  - MD Helicopters MH-6 Little Bird, a special forces variant
- Xi'an H-6, a Chinese bomber
- Besson H-6, a French flying boat
- Sikorsky R-6, a 1943 American helicopter

=== Watercraft ===
- HMS H6, a British submarine
- USS H-6 (SS-149), a United States submarine
- HMS Hurricane (H06), a British Havant-class destroyer
- HMS Keith (H06), a British B-class destroyer

=== Other vehicles ===
- PRR H6, a steam locomotive
- Haval H6, a compact crossover SUV produced by Great Wall Motor
- Hispano-Suiza H6, an automobile
- Rely H6, a van

=== Roads ===
- H6 Childs Way, a road in England
- Highway H06, a road in Ukraine

== Other uses ==
- <h6></h6>, level 6 heading markup for HTML Web pages, see HTML element#heading
- Flat-six engine, sometimes marketed as H6
- Halloween: The Curse of Michael Myers, the sixth film in the Halloween franchise
- H6: Diary of a Serial Killer, a movie
- Composition H6, an explosive
- H6, a watch possibly made by John Harrison
- H6, the name given by the British Home Office to a Chinese businessman and alleged spy Yang Tengbo

== See also ==
- 6H (disambiguation)
