= Love Expresso =

Love Espresso
- Spanish theatrical release poster
- Spanish: Café solo... o con ellas
- Directed by: Álvaro Díaz Lorenzo
- Written by: Álvaro Díaz Lorenzo
- Produced by: Eduardo Campoy; José Manuel Lorenzo
- Starring: Alejo Sauras; Lucía Jiménez; Asier Etxeandia; Elena Ballesteros; Diego Paris; Javier Godino; Inma Cuesta; Terele Pávez
- Cinematography: Teo Delgado
- Edited by: Luisma del Valle
- Music by: Mario de Benito
- Production companies: Drive Cine; Estudios Picasso
- Distributed by: Buena Vista International
- Release dates: March 2007 (Málaga); 29 June 2007 (Spain)
- Country: Spain
- Language: Spanish

Love Espresso (Spanish: Café solo... o con ellas) is a 2007 Spanish comedy film directed and written by Álvaro Díaz Lorenzo. The cast features Alejo Sauras, Lucía Jiménez, Asier Etxeandia, Elena Ballesteros, Diego Paris, Javier Godino, Inma Cuesta and Terele Pávez.

== Plot ==
The plot concerns the dating experiences of a group of emotionally incompetent males close to their 30s.

== Cast ==
- Alejo Sauras as Pedro
- Lucía Jiménez as Bea
- Asier Etxeandia as Javi
- Elena Ballesteros as Alma
- Diego Paris as Hugo
- Javier Godino as Dani
- Inma Cuesta as Sonia
- Terele Pávez as Paca
- Pilar Abella as Ana
- Marta Nieto

== Production ==
The film was produced by Drive Cine and Estudios Picasso and it had the participation of Telecinco.

== Release ==
The film screened in March 2014 at the 10th Málaga Film Festival, where it clinched the Audience Award. It was theatrically released in Spain on 29 June 2007. It performed well at the domestic box office, grossing over €2 million upon the first month of its theatrical run and becoming the highest-grossing Spanish release of the year up to that point.

== Reception ==
Jordi Costa of El País found the film worrying in terms of its status as a debut feature (insofar it was lacking in any sort of fresh look), presenting instead "four stale sitcom archetypes" crossing paths in a "microcosm inhabited by female clichés and extras in need of motivation".

Jonathan Holland of Variety presented the film as a sort of translation to Spain of American film American Pie, featuring "a couple decent comic scenes and two good perfs" rising "above the pop soundtrack, navel-gazing and scatology".

== See also ==
- List of Spanish films of 2007
