= Alejo Sauras =

Spanish actor (born 1979)

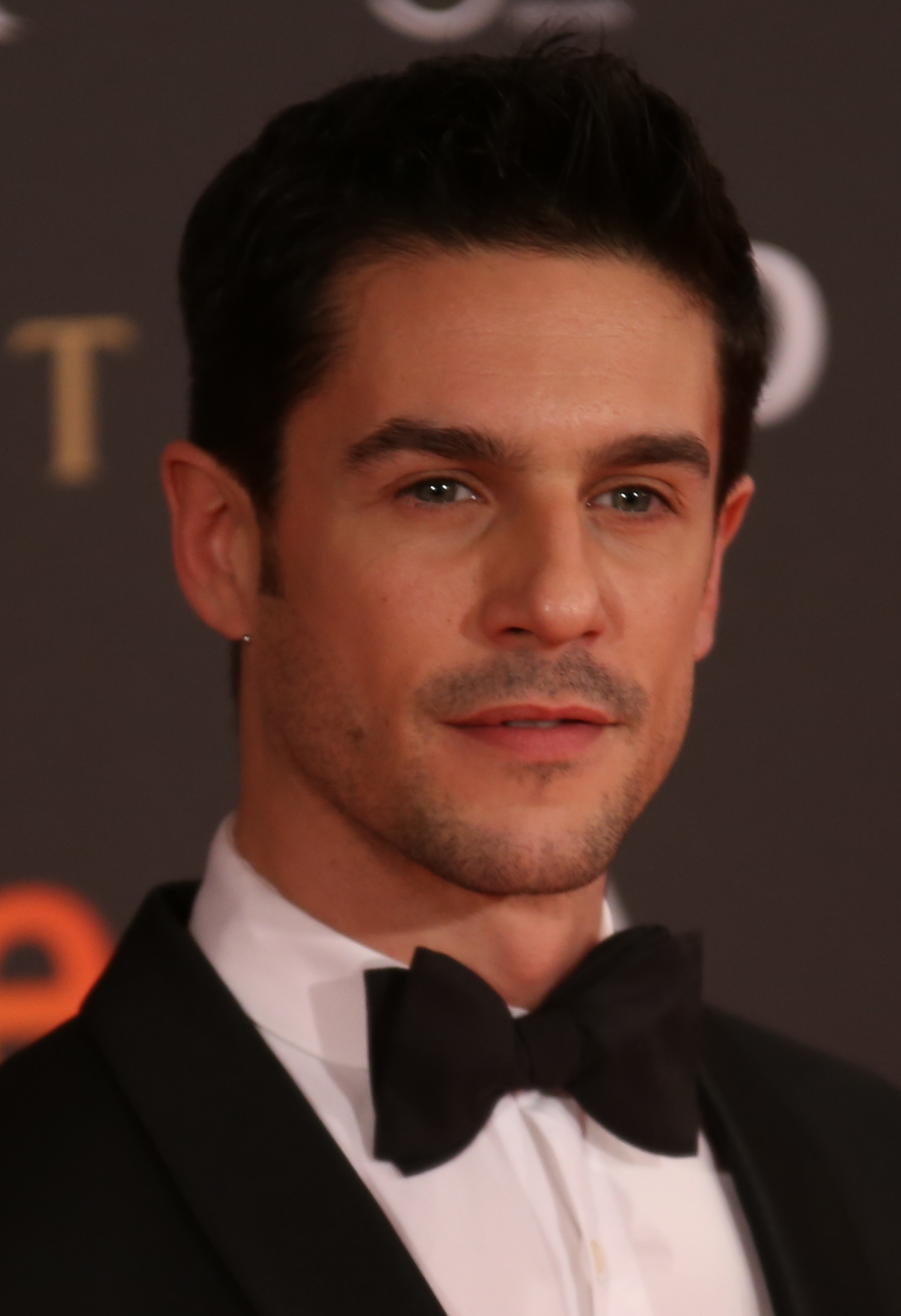
- Sauras at the 2017 Goya Awards
- Born: Alejo Martín Sauras; June 29, 1979 (age 47); Esporlas, Spain
- Years active: 1997–present

Alejo Martín Sauras (born June 29, 1979) is a Spanish actor who is best known as Raúl Martinez in Los Serrano.

== Biography ==
Sauras was born in Palma de Mallorca, Mallorca but he spend his childhood in Madrid. Sauras studied aviation electronics for a while but he left his studies to pursue acting. Along with his acting studies, he studied Japanese, which gave him two theatre roles afterward. He also studied dance with Sue Samuels of the Broadway Dance Center in 2001. Sauras begin to get small roles in television series and his breakthrough happened through the TV series Al salir de clase (1997–2001) where Sauras played a young gay man, Santi. Later, Sauras had roles in Y decirte una estupidez, por ejemplo, te quiero (2000) and Diario de una becaria (2003). He also made guest roles in television series. From 2003 to 2008 Sauras played Raúl Martínez in Los Serrano.

== Awards ==
In 2007, Sauras won a "best actor" prize for his role in the movie Bienvenido a casa.

== Filmography ==
=== Movies ===
- Mensaka (1998)
- Y decirte alguna estupidez, por ejemplo, te quiero (2000)
- La mujer de mi vida (2001)
- Diario de una becaria (2003)
- Atrapados TV movie (2003)
- Mentiras TV movie (2005)
- H6: Diario de un asesino (2005)
- Bienvenido a casa (2006)
- Lo Que Tiene El Otro (2007)
- La habitación de Fermat (2007)
- Café solo o con ellas (2007)
- Lo que tiene el otro (2007)
- Sexykiller, morirás por ella (2007)
- Mentiras y gordas (2008)
- Los abrazos rotos (2009)
- Solo química (2015)
- El jugador de ajedrez (2017), como Javier Sánchez

=== Television ===
- Al salir de clase (1999–2000) as Santi
- Javier ya no vive solo (2003) as Óscar
- Los Serrano (2003–2008) as Raúl Martínez
- Acusados (2010) as Pablo Alonso.
- 14 de abril. La República (2011–2019) as Jesús Prado.
- Estoy vivo (2017–) as El Enlace

=== Theatre ===
- La Ínsula Barataria (1996)
- Manuke Mura (1996, in Japanese)
- Tonari No Ojiisan (1997, in Japanese)
- La Gallina Ciega (2002)
