= Oliva Sabuco =

Spanish medical philosopher and writer

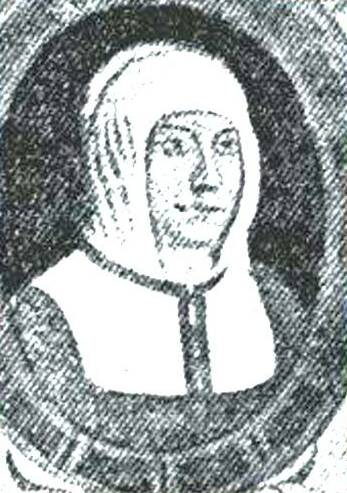
- Unknown model of Oliva Sabuco, c. 1587
- Born: Luisa Oliva Sabuco de Nantes Barrera; 2 December 1562; Alcaraz, Spain
- Died: c. 1646
- Spouse: Don Acacio de Buedo
- Scientific career
- Fields: Philosophy; Psychology

Oliva Sabuco de Nantes Barrera (2 December 1562 in Alcaraz – c. 1646) was a Spanish writer in holistic medical philosophy in the late 16th – early 17th century. She was interested in the interaction between the physical and psychological phenomena; therefore, she wrote a collection of medical and psychological treatises that target human nature and explain the effects of emotions on the body and soul. She analyzed theoretical claims of ancient philosophers and wrote an early theory of what is now considered applied psychology.

== Early life ==
Luisa Oliva Sabuco de Nantes Barrera was born in Alcaraz, Spain, in 1562 and was baptised in the Holy Trinity church on 2 December of that same year. Her mother was Francisca de Cozar and her father was Don Miguel Sabuco y Alvarez. Although not much is known about her formal education, it is evident that Oliva Sabuco was taught medicine by her father. She was well acquainted with classical and contemporary philosophy and was knowledgeable about medical theory. By 26 December 1585, at the age of 23, she married Don Acacio de Buedo. By age 25, she had already published a novel far ahead of her time.

== Theories ==
=== Mind–body coexistence ===
Sabuco combined ancient Greek and Christian philosophies, along with Aristotelian views in order to explain how the mind and body interact in a holistic manner. She believed human nature to be a single concept, where the rational soul and spiritual soul must co-occur for a human being to exist. A human being would be considered a corpse with no potential for living when it lacked either of the two souls. Sabuco agreed with Aristotle's vision of form and matter in relation to the body: they both believed the interaction between the mind and body was the formal organization of a whole living human being. Her theory differed in the sense that the human being could not exist until the divine soul/mind coexisted with the body/matter.

Her approach to the mind–body interaction mirrored that of Plato's. The mind was in charge of moral judgments and reasons, which caused the body to react in certain ways. Therefore, the body carried out the moral judgments that were processed. Sabuco placed emphasis on self-knowledge and the capacity of the mind to exercise free will. Self-knowledge and ethical decisions allowed hope, health, strength, and a natural lifespan to be placed on the human body while free will directed the passions and emotions.

=== Harmony and a healthy state ===
According to Sabuco, the soul was divided into three parts: the sensitive, the biological, and the intellectual soul, all of which would be in a harmonic balance with one another. The balance between the four humours, hot, cold, wet, and dry, must also be in harmony in order for the human organ system to be in a healthy state. Sabuco used a temperature-humidity schema, derived from Hippocrates, to evaluate illnesses and individuals’ state of health. Although her ideas originated from Hippocrates's four bodily humours, Sabuco denied the importance of his theory and insisted the focus lie on the severity of temperature and humidity. For example, illnesses, disabilities and premature death were results of disharmony among the three parts of the soul or the temperature-humidity schema. Sabuco also coined the term chilo, which was a white liquid energizing force that travelled through a complex network of anatomical channels from one organ system to another. Chilo maintained the proper temperature and humidity within the body; nonetheless, an imbalance could lead to negative states of health. The purpose of chilo was to communicate movement to the bodily organs and orient them to carry out the goal meant to be accomplished.

=== Moral philosophy ===
Sabuco's theory of moral philosophy incorporated traditional views of virtue ethics. Good and evil were intertwined in the world and could banish each other. Her theory stated how something good could be present in evil and something evil could be present in good. There was never such a concept as pure evil or pure good. Within her theory of human nature, only two evils existed: avoidable diseases and premature ageing. Sabuco promoted moderation and temperance to control emotions and passions; her theory originated from Plato's concept of sophrosyne, where self-understanding is used to obtain wisdom and virtue. However, she referenced temperance as the most important virtue that was obtained through self-knowledge. Temperance and wisdom were then labelled as the answers to evil because they sustained human life and provided peace, happiness, and contentment between emotions and the soul.

=== Cosmology ===
The second part of her work described astronomical and geological events and how they support the theory of human nature. It was important to learn how the macrocosm functions because humans were a microcosm within the broader world. Understanding how the world came to be would teach humans how to live in that world. A person's condition, whether improving or declining, was related to cosmology. Such topics included the moon, the magnitude of the Earth and its atmosphere, solar and lunar eclipses and the magnitude of the cosmos. An individual's life cycle would improve or decline just like a moon's cycle would be waxing or waning. Within the macrocosm, the moon was defined as the brain of the world, which provided moisture and growth to its waters. Microcosm, on the other hand, described the sun as the heart of the world, which gave warmth and life to the world. The emphasis was placed on the brain, making it more significant than the heart, as the moon was more vital than the sun.

=== World improvements: judicial, legislative, and social thoughts ===
Sabuco introduced smaller systems of reformation into her idea of human nature. Sabuco advocated for the creation of legislative, judicial and social reforms in the welfare rights of the powerless, people such as peasants, workers and householders. The powerless were the ones whose health was severely impacted the most by the misery and despair of everyday life. Excess and greed should be avoided because they were bad for the social and individual body.

She argued for a legal reformation of judicial laws, doctrines of appeals and better protection under the law. She reasoned that the individuals who created the laws would be the only ones who would comprehend them. Therefore, the laws would not be applicable or fair to lower socioeconomic classes who did not partake in the creation of them. Laws must be clear, written in simple language and precise so proper justice could be granted to the poor. Sabuco also argued against juridical doctrines of appeal to authority figures of Roman law. Authoritarian power was passed down through generations, and individuals' verdicts had varying interpretations from previous generations of authorities who lacked knowledge about the present case. As a result, she believed protection under the law was unequal for most of the public, and most did not receive proper justice.

Legislative reformation should include protection for farmers and peasants because their labour and production were essential in the survival of others within the nation. She was a strong proponent of preventing the authority from confiscating land, livestock, and crops.

Sabuco criticized university policies and the objectives of the education system. She mentioned the lack of proper criteria for an individual regarding admissions and recommended that examiners evaluate potential candidates' abilities when granting admission. She also denounced the importance of charging students tuition because students were admitted who could afford tuition but lacked the proper aptitude to succeed.

=== Physical medicine and remedies ===
Sabuco disagreed with the traditional medical theory and thought its failure to control medicine was due to people's ignorance of the impact of emotions on physical health. Emotions such as anger, sadness, love, excessive joy, hatred, shame and distrust caused imbalances in the bodily humours which squeezed the humour and humidity out of the brain where the soul was located. The only true appropriate medicine would comfort the brain and be in accordance with the body and the soul. Words and deeds that generated joy and hope and taking care of the stomach were the three pillars of health that could comfort the brain. If optimism, contented happiness and abdominal temperature were left unattended, they could lead to sorrow, discontent and melancholy. Another general remedy mentioned was the diversion of humour through bodily openings so it would not reach internal organs.

== Treatise ==
The book, published in Madrid in 1587, was called Nueva Filosofia de la Naturaleza del Hombre (New Philosophy of Human Nature). It consisted of seven separately titled treatises. The first five, Knowledge of One's Self, Composition of the World as It Is, Things That Will Improve This World and Its Nations, Treatments and Remedies of Proper Medicine, and Proper Medicine Derived from Human Nature' are written in the Castilian language. While the last two, Brief Exposition on Human Nature: The Foundations of the Art of Medicine, and Proper Philosophy of the Nature of Composite Things, of Humans, and of the World, Unknown to the Ancients, are written in Latin. This book, in its entirety, was dedicated to Philip II of Spain.

The first treatise within Sabuco's most famous book, New Philosophy of Human Nature, introduces a discussion between three peasants, whom she identified as shepherds and who critique the views of others. These three shepherds continue as the main characters throughout the remaining six treatises, and their discussions cover various topics of human nature. The identity of her characters represents the significance of remaining in close contact with nature and staying isolated from society so societal views will not sully the mind. She purposely included peasants as characters in order to demonstrate how philosophy and medicine are relevant regardless of social class. Sabuco believed her theory should be relevant to simple folks and applicable to their lives. The treatises emphasized the universe by describing the theory of mutual interdependence of the soul, body, and cosmos.

In the pages of her treatise, she explored many ideas, amongst which is the comparison of a human body to an upside-down tree. It is in the brain, like in the root of a tree, that all diseases begin and it is possible to cure them through various methods amongst which are words of cheerfulness, sound thought, and even to the hearing of music. The process of using wise words against violent emotions such as anger, she called "Rhetorical Insinuation" because it explored the idea of being able to persuade the will through words. She explored how emotions have an effect on the human body and how one can control their effects by focusing on the chief organ of the body, the brain. According to Father Feyjoo, much of the research she did contributed to the ability of physicians following her to develop some of the first theories around nervous diseases.

Going back to the idea of the brain as King, she wrote how during sleep the brain was fed all its necessary nutrients, which have been, throughout the day, collected in the stomach. Once the nutrients were taken to the brain and nervous fluid was created, it was allocated throughout the body by a fluid aside from red blood. Some have postulated that she was referring to a concept similar to white blood cells when she wrote this, for she makes mention of a fluid white in colour nourishing the body with information.

== Fame and influence ==
Her work has sometimes been compared with Descartes' The Passion of the Soul, for like him she imagined the seat of the soul to be in the brain. It is known that she was famous in her day because in 1604, while she was still alive, Franciscio Lopez de Uveda, a physician and poet from Toledo, expressed that a character he was working on would out fame people like Oliva Sabuco and Don Quixote, thus implying her name to be one associated with fame. In addition to this, the famous French physician Charles le Pois cited Sabuco's influence on his own views regarding diseases such as hysteria.

== Summary ==
Without definitively solving the mind-body problem, Sabuco moves philosophy a step in that direction by providing both a new chemical explanation, with white fluid as a vehicle of mind-body interaction, and an explanation of the role of emotions in physical health.

== Later life ==
Credit for her work was sometimes given to her father, Don Miguel Sabuco y Alvarez, because of a powerful letter written by him claiming the work as his own. His letter and a promissory note written by Sabuco's husband and brother were implemented a year following the publication of the book. The letter claimed Don Miguel Sabuco as the true author of New Philosophy of Human Nature and an explanation stating that her name was included in an attempt to honour her, but she had no legal interest in the volume nor authority over it. However, recent scholarship has defended her case, claiming that she was the writer. Because of the nature of her material, she incurred the attention of the inquisitors and had all her books burned. She lived out her days in the convent of Dominican nuns in Alcaraz and took on a monastic habit. There, she eventually died around the year 1646.

== Honours ==
A crater on the planet Venus was named Barrera in her honour; see List of craters on Venus.

== Bibliography ==
- Sabuco, Oliva New Philosophy of Human Nature (1587), Waithe, Mary Ellen, Vintro, Maria, Zorita, C. Angel, transls., University of Illinois Press, 2007.
- Sabuco, Oliva The True Medicine, (1587), Spain, Translated from Spanish to English by Gianna Pomata (2010). ISBN 978-0-7727-2067-2.
- Maura, Juan Francisco. “Arte de saber vivir, filosofía presocrática y oriental en la Nueva filosofía de Oliva Sabuco (1562-1622)”. Lemir (Revista de literatura medieval y del Renacimiento). Lemir 27 (2023) 359-409. https://parnaseo.uv.es/Lemir/Revista/Revista27/06_Maura_Juan.pdf

== Sources ==
- Allen, Prudence (March 1991). A History of Women Philosophers, Volume II: Medieval, Renaissance and Enlightenment Women Philosophers A.D. by Mary Ellen Waithe. The Review of Metaphysics 44 (3).
- Barona, Josep Lluís (1993). The Body Republic: Social Order and Human Body in Renaissance Medical Thought. History and Philosophy of the Life Sciences 15 (2): 176, 178.
- Brooke, Elisabeth (1995). Women Healers: Portraits of Herbalists, Physicians, and Midwives. Inner Traditions / Bear & Co. p. 80. ISBN 0892815485.
- Cannon, Mary Agnes (1916). The education of women during the renaissance. Washington D.C.: National capital press, inc.
- Flynn, Maureen (Autumn 1998). Taming Anger's Daughters: New Treatment for Emotional Problems in Renaissance Spain. Renaissance Quarterly 51 (3): 875.
- The Gentleman's magazine. London: London, F. Jefferies. pp. 239–240.
- Keitt, Andrew (Spring 2005). The Miraculous Body of Evidence: Visionary Experience, Medical Discourse, and the Inquisition in Seventeenth-Century Spain. The Sixteenth Century Journal 36 (1): 47.
- Kersey, Ethel M. Women Philosophers: a Bio-critical Source Book. NY: Greenwood, 1989.
- Pérez, Janet (2002). The Feminist Encyclopedia of Spanish Literature: N-Z. Greenwood Publishing Group. ISBN 031332445X.
- Pomata, G. (Ed.), The True Medicine. Toronto: Itler Inc. and Centre for Reformation and Renaissance Studies. 2010. p. 5-6,49.
- Waithe, M. E. A History of Women Philosophers: Medieval, Renaissance and Enlightenment Women Philosophers A.D. 500-1600. Dordrecht: Kluwer Academic Publishers. 1989. p. 264-268,270,273-274, 279.
- Waithe, Mary Ellen (2007). New Philosophy of Human Nature: Neither Known to nor Attained by the Great Ancient Philosophers, Which Will Improve Human Life and Health. University of Illinois Press. pp. 1–3, 10. ISBN 0252092317.
- Waithe, M. E., Vintro M. C., & Zorita, C. A. (Eds.), New philosophy of human nature: Neither known to nor attained by the great ancient philosophers, which will improve human life and health. Urbana and Chicago: University of Illinois Press. 2007. p. 2-3, 16–21, 27–29.
- Winter, Calvert J. (Spring 1936). Doña Oliva Sabuco de Nantes by Florentino M. Torner. Books Abroad 10 (2).
