= Lo que tiene el otro =

2008 Spanish-Venezuelan film

- Film poster
- Directed by: Miguel Perelló
- Release date: 15 August 2008
- Country: Venezuela
- Language: Spanish

Lo que tiene el otro is a Spanish-Venezuelan film co-production directed by Miguel Perelló. It premiered in Venezuela on 15 August 2008.
