= Ana Fernández García =

Spanish actress

Ana Fernández
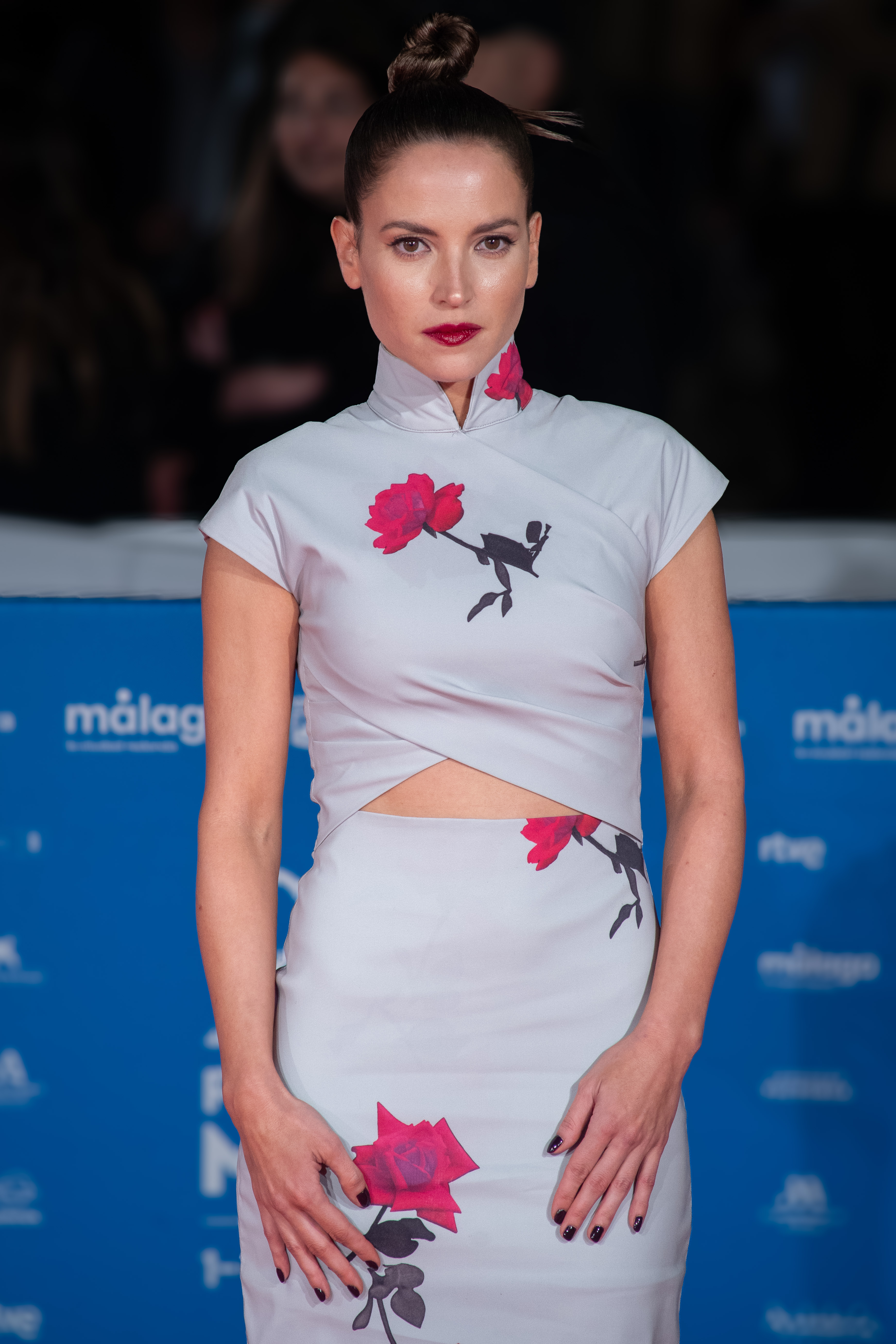
- Fernández in 2024
- Born: Ana Carlota Fernández García; 10 November 1989 (age 36); Madrid, Spain
- Occupation: Actress
- Years active: 2007–present

Ana Carlota Fernández García (born 10 November 1989) is a Spanish actress. She played Carlota in the Netflix series Cable Girls.

== Biography ==
She has two younger siblings, Carlos and María, who played the role of Sandra's sister, Marta, in The Protected. She began studying dramatic art when she was 14 years old and undertook her first role when she was aged 4 in the miniseries El Joven Picasso, directed by Juan Antonio Bardem. Her most famous appearance in the theatre was in Helena de Troya. She started studying a degree in Advertising and Public Relations, but she didn't finish it.

Fernández is mainly known for two roles on TV. The first was the role of Sofía in Cuestión de sexo between 2007 and 2009. The second was the role of Sandra in The Protected, in which she worked between 2010 and 2012. In 2011, she made a cameo in Los Quién playing the role of Mónica, Tinós sister.

Fernández was due to film her first movie, Promoción Fantasma, in the summer of 2011; but she had to reject it because of the filming of The Protected.

In March 2013, she started practicing her first stage play "¿Por qué yo?" by author and director Belén Verdugo, and she performed it in Madrid for the first time on 27 September 2013.

Between 2017 and 2020, Fernández played Carlota Senillosa on Netflix's Cable Girls.

== Filmography ==
=== Film ===
| Year | Title | Original title | Role |
|---|---|---|---|
| 2014 | Lavapiés | Historias de Lavapiés | Mónica |
| 2015 | Just a Little Chemistry | Sólo química | Olivia Romero |
| 2020 | Don't Listen | Voces | Ruth |
| 2021 | Girlfriends | Chavalas | Lili |
| 2024 | The Flag | La bandera | Lina |

=== Television ===
| Year | Title | Original title | Role | Notes |
|---|---|---|---|---|
| 2007–2009 | Cuestión de sexo | Cuestión de sexo | Sofía | Main role (37 episodes) |
| 2008–2010 | Impares | Impares | Carlota | 2 episodes |
| 2010–2012 | The Protected | Los protegidos | Sandra Olaiz | Main role (41 episodes) |
| 2010 | Physics or Chemistry | Física o química | Herself | Episode: "Segunda oportunidad" |
| 2011 | Los Quién | Los Quién | Mónica | Episode: "La lotera de Vallecas" |
| 2012 | IP | IP | Patricia Vega | Episode: "El Comienzo" |
| 2017–2020 | Cable Girls | Las chicas del cable | Carlota Rodriguez de Senillosa | Main role (42 episodes) |
| 2018 | Love Is Forever | Amar es para siempre | Carlota Hidalgo | Episode: #13.1369 |
| 2021–2023 | The Protected: The Return | Los protegidos: El regreso | Sandra | Main role (10 episodes) |
| 2024 | From Tomorrow | Desde el mañana | Amaia Ginés | |
