= Jerónimo Tristante =

Spanish novelist and mystery writer (born 1969)

Jéronimo Tristante (born 1969 Murcia, Spain) is a Spanish novelist and mystery writer.

== Biography ==
Jerónimo Salmerón Tristante studied biology at the University of Murcia. Later, he worked as a biology and geology teacher in a secondary school. His first novel was Crónica de Jufré, published in 2001 as Jerónimo Salmerón Tristante, and his second novel was El Rojo en el Azul, published as Jero Salmerón. His third novel, was his best known work El Misterio de la Casa Aranda, the first mystery by Víctor Ross, which was adapted into a television series Victor Ross. His works have been translated into Polish, French and Italian.

== Works ==
- Crónica de Jufré (2003, as Jerónimo Salmerón Tristante) ISBN 978-84-7564-263-5.
- El Rojo en el Azul (2005, as Jero Salmerón) ISBN 978-84-96364-39-4.
- El Misterio de la Casa Aranda: Víctor Ros, un detective en el Madrid de finales del siglo XIX (2008)
- El Caso de la Viuda Negra: las investigaciones del detective Víctor Ros entre Madrid y Córdoba a finales del siglo XIX (2008) ISBN 978-84-96748-33-0.
- El Tesoro de los Nazárenos (2009) ISBN 978-84-92429-48-6.
- 1969: Un extraño caso de asesinato y corrupción en el año en que el hombre llegó a la Luna (2009) ISBN 978-84-96748-95-8.
- El enigma de la calle Calabria: el detective Víctor Ros en Barcelona (2010) ISBN 978-84-92695-87-4.
- El Valle de las Sombras (2011)
- Océanos de tiempo (2012) ISBN 9788490324738
- La última noche de Víctor Ros'. (2013) ISBN 9788401354564
- Víctor Ros y el gran robo del oro español (2015) ISBN 978-84-01-01585-4
- Secretos (2019) ISBN 978-84-9189-085-0
