= Antonio Garrido (actor) =

Spanish actor

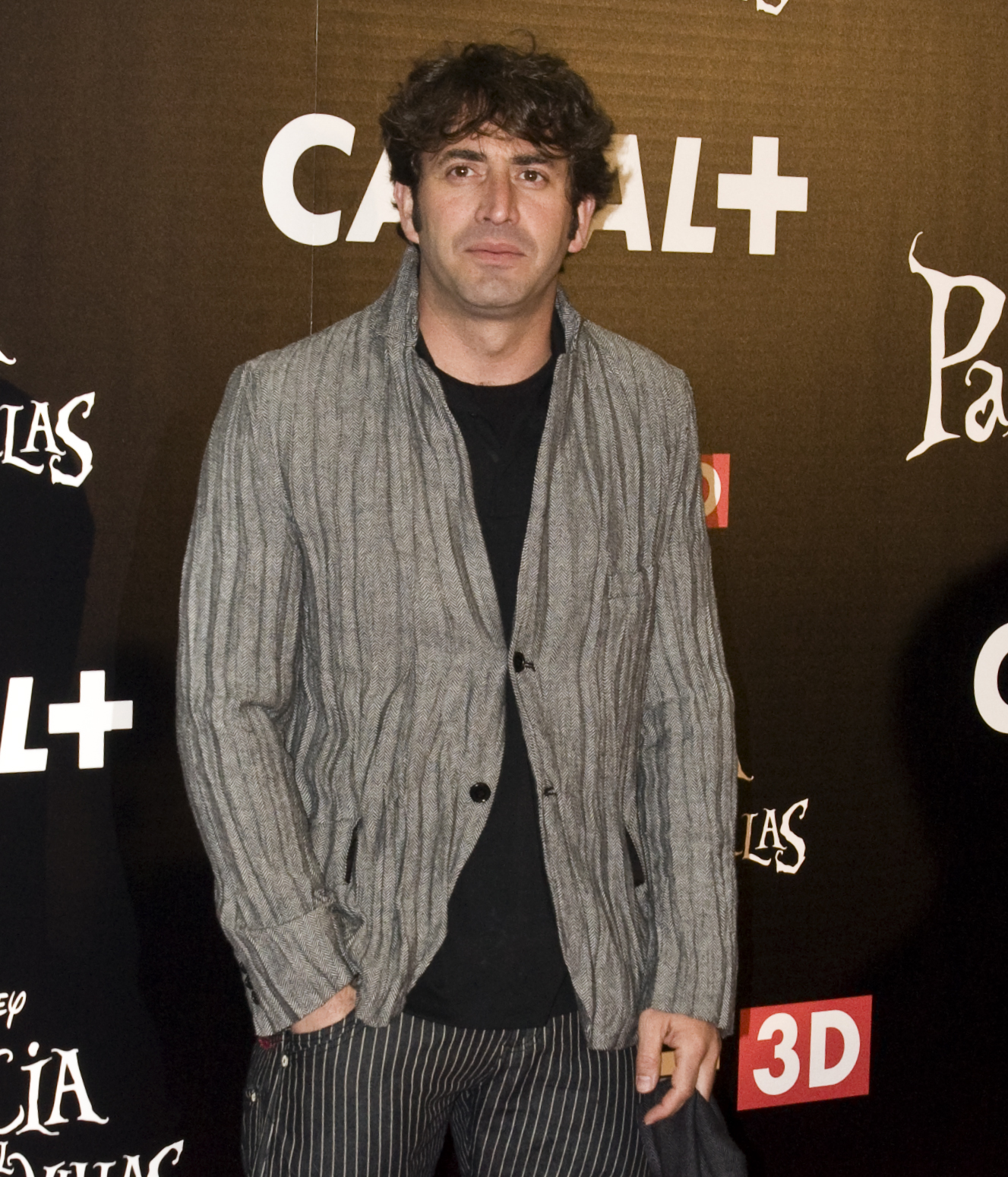
- Antonio at the photocall of Alice in Wonderland in 2010.
- Born: Joaquín Reyes; 20 August 1971 (age 53); Seville, Province of Seville, Andalusia, Spain
- Occupation(s): Actor and TV presenter

Antonio Jesús Garrido Benito (born 20 August 1971 in Seville, Province of Seville, Andalusia, Spain) is a Spanish actor and TV presenter.

He started in a theatre company, taking part in several plays like Bajarse al moro, Breve Brecht, Un nuevo mundo, El barbero de Sevilla, Réquiem de Berlín or El otro lado de la cama. He played Joaquín in La chica de ayer (2009).

== Filmography ==
- Camarón by Jaime Chávarri, 2005
- Desde que amanece apetece by Antonio del Real, 2005
- El camino de los ingleses by Antonio Banderas, 2005
- Diario de una Ninfómana by Christian Molina, 2008
- The End (2012)

== Television ==
- Al filo de la ley, TVE, 2005
- Los simuladores, Cuatro, 2006–2007
- La chica de ayer, Antena 3, 2008–2009
- Los protegidos, Antena 3, 2010–2012
- Con el culo al aire, 2013
- Isabel, 2013
- Amar es para siempre, 2013–2014
- El Caso. Crónica de sucesos, 2016
- El hombre de tu vida, 2016
- iFamily, 2016
- Cuerpo de élite, 2018
- Servir y proteger, 2018–2019
- Matadero, 2019
- El embarcadero, 2019–2020
- Mercado Central, 2019–2021
- Los protegidos: El regreso, 2021–2023
- Historias de Protegidos, 2022

== TV presenter ==
- El día D, Canal Sur
- Vamos de fiesta, Canal Sur
- Andalucía directo, Canal Sur
- Gente de mente, Cuatro, 2007
- Identity, TVE, 2007–2008
- Hijos de Babel, TVE, 2008
- ¿Quién quiere ser millonario? (Who Wants to Be a Millionaire?), Antena 3, 2009

== Prizes ==
- Premios de la Unión de Actores (Prizes of Actors' Union), Nomination for Best Theatre Actor in a Supporting Role, 2005
