= Los protegidos: El regreso =

Spanish television series

- Official poster
- Genre: Fantasy; Thriller; Drama
- Based on: the characters by Darío Madrona and Ruth García
- Screenplay by: Carlos García Miranda; Curro Serrano
- Directed by: José María Caro
- Starring: Antonio Garrido; Ana Fernández; Luis Fernández; Mario Marzo; Daniel Avilés; Maggie García
- Country of origin: Spain
- Original language: Spanish
- No. of seasons: 3
- No. of episodes: 15

Production
- Executive producers: Montse García; Curro Novallas; Jorge Redondo; Teddy Villalba
- Running time: 50 minutes
- Production companies: Atresmedia Televisión; Buendía Estudios; Boomerang TV

Original release
- Network: ATRESplayer Premium
- Release: 19 September 2021 – 11 January 2026

Related
- Los protegidos

Los protegidos: El regreso is a Spanish fantasy television series that began airing on Atresplayer Premium in September 2021. It consists of a continuation of Los protegidos, set about a decade later than the events dealt with in the original series.

The series was broadcast from 2021 to 2026, with three seasons and 15 episodes.

== Premise ==
Set a decade after the events that brought Los protegidos to a happy closure, the "Castillo Rey" family, a group of initially unrelated people empowered with supernatural abilities, teams up again to deal with a new threat.

== Cast ==
- Antonio Garrido as Mario.
- Ana Fernández as Sandra.
- Luis Fernández as Culebra.
- Mario Marzo as Lucas.
- Daniel Avilés as Carlitos.
- Maggie García as Lucía.
- Gracia Olayo as Rosa Ruano.
- Óscar Ladoire as Antonio Ruano.
- Javier Mendo as Borja Ruano.
- Maripaz Sagayo
- Carlotta Cosials as Paqui
- Eduardo Lloveras
- Cosette Silguero as Dora

== Production and release ==
The series consists of a continuation of the series Los protegidos, which aired on Antena 3 from 2010 to 2012. None of the two creators of the original series (Darío Madrona and Ruth García) were involved in the revival. The production secured the return of the main original cast members, with the exception of Priscilla Delgado (Lucía), who was replaced by Maggie García.

Produced by Atresmedia Televisión in collaboration with Buendía Estudios and Boomerang TV, Montse García, Curro Novallas, Jorge Redondo and Teddy Villalba were credited as executive producers. Consisting of 4 episodes, the series was directed by José María Caro and written by Carlos García Miranda and Curro Serrano. Shooting began in April 2021.

Atresmedia scheduled the release of the first episode for 19 September 2021.

In December 2021, Atresmedia reported the renovation of the series for a second season.

Series	Episodes	Originally released		Ref.
Series	Episodes	First released	Last released	Ref.
1	4	19 September 2021	19 December 2021	
2	6	18 December 2022	22 January 2023	
3	5	14 December 2025	11 January 2026	

== Episodes ==
=== Season 1: The Return (2021) ===
1. Start Over (Empezar de Nuevo)
2. Treason (Traición)
3. Stronger Together (Juntos somos más fuertes)
4. Memories (Recuerdos)

=== Season 2: D.N.A. (2022–23) ===
1. The Wedding (La Boda)
2. Reunions (Reencuentros)
3. Secret Mission (Misión Secreta)
4. The Power Room (La Sala de los Poderes)
5. The Plague (La Plaga)
6. Just in Time (Justo a Tiempo)

=== Season 3: A New Power (2025–26) ===
1. Episode 1
2. Episode 2
3. Episode 3
4. Episode 4
5. Episode 5
