= Los protegidos (Spanish TV series) =

- Genre: Fantasy; Thriller; Adventure; Comedy; Drama
- Created by: Darío Madrona; Ruth García
- Starring: Angie Cepeda; Antonio Garrido
- Theme music composer: Cesar Benito
- Opening theme: "Los protegidos"
- Composer: Cesar Benito
- Country of origin: Spain
- No. of seasons: 3
- No. of episodes: 41

Production
- Executive producers: Emilio A. Pina; Iñaki Mercero
- Production company: Boomerang TV

Original release
- Network: Antena 3
- Release: 12 January 2010 – 13 June 2012

Related
- Los protegidos: El regreso

Los Protegidos is a Spanish fantasy television series created by Darío Madrona and Ruth García that originally aired on Antena 3 from 2010 to 2012. The plot follows the story of the "family" Castillo Rey, a group of people that are actually unrelated to each other but must pose as that because they have one secret: the children have special powers, and there is a group of people that are going after them. It was produced by Boomerang TV.

A continuation of the series, Los protegidos: El regreso, premiered on 19 September 2021.

== Plot ==
Everything starts in a calm neighbourhood in an unnamed city. Jimena (Angie Cepeda), a married woman, is with her daughter Blanca, preparing her for bed. The girl tells her mother that she had a nightmare: two men took her in the middle of the night, and the latter could only run after the van they had taken her in. Jimena calms her worries, tells her to sleep and goes to her own bed, with her husband... and that same night, a van comes. Two men take Blanca in the middle of the night, while Jimena can only do something other than run after the van.

Nine months later, Mario (Antonio Garrido), a widower, works in a police station and takes care of his only son, Carlos (Daniel Avilés), a socially awkward boy who wears glasses and likes books. However, this is not the only problem he has: when Mario starts to talk with him, after having gotten into a fight with some kids at his school, Carlos unexpectedly reveals that he has Telekinesis, which he demonstrates by throwing a pair of scissors into the wall.

In the last nine months, Jimena has divorced, and now spends her free time looking for her missing daughter. However, it's only recently that she has started to tell the people about the dream her daughter had. When Mario hears this, he decides that maybe he could talk with Jimena in order to ascertain what to do, but Jimena, although initially spooked by his awkward manners, finally tells him that she can't do anything. The next day, Jimena also meets Silvestre Patxi López, a man who apparently knows what happened to Blanca. Silvestre brings her to meet his adopted daughter, Lucía (Priscilla Delgado), a girl that can apparently read minds, as well as a teenager he knows that lives on the street, nicknamed "Culebra" (Lucho Fernandez), meaning "Snake", who can become invisible and uses his power to steal money and support himself. Apparently, there is a group of people that are kidnapping children and teenagers that have special powers, and want to use them for unknown but clearly nefarious purposes. "Culebra" is the only one Silvestre knows that has managed to escape. Silvestre still remembers a boy he had taken in until a pair of "policemen" arrived and took him away, and is now working to find the children and free them, while at the same time preventing the knowledge of the special children from spreading into the main populace.

Meanwhile, Sandra (Ana Fernández), a teenager, gets into a fight with her younger sister and accidentally electrocutes her, knocking her out. Scared, she runs away to avoid having to face her family, and that night, while attempting to sleep in a metro station, she meets "Culebra", who, after discovering her power, takes her to see Silvestre. At the same moment, Jimena decides to call Mario, and both of them with Carlos go visit Silvestre at the same moment.

However, a pair of men from the group that looks for the special children has arrived to Silvestre's house, looking for Lucía. It is only through Lucía's power that Silvestre manages to get his daughter to leave the house. Mario, Jimena, "Culebra", Sandra and Carlos find Lucía in the park, and then they find Silvestre dead. The six are then forced to run away from the men that killed Silvestre, and find they can't go to Mario's house because the bad guys know where it is. Using a series of clues Silvestre had in a journal and that Jimena took, the six go to Valle Perdido, a suburb. There, they rent a house, posing as the "Castillo Rey" family, while they attempt to why was Valle Perdido so important, as well as hiding from those that wish to kidnap the children.

== Characters and actors ==
=== Main ===
Actor	Character	Seasons		
Actor	Character	1	2	3
Antonio Garrido	Mario Montero / Mario Castillo	Main	Main	Main
Angie Cepeda	Jimena Garcia / Jimena Rey	Main	Main	Main
Ana Fernández García	Sandra Olaiz / Sandra Castillo Rey	Main	Main	Main
Lucho Fernandez	Culebra / Poli Castillo Rey	Main	Main	Main
Daniel Avilés	Carlitos Montero / Carlitos Castillo Rey	Main	Main	Main
Priscilla Delgado	Lucía Expósito / Lucía Castillo Rey	Main	Main	Main
Gracia Olayo	Rosa Ruano	Main	Main	Main
Esmeralda Moya	Claudia Ruano	Main	Main	Absent
Mario Marzo	Lucas López / Lucas Castillo	Main	Main	Main
Javier Mendo	Borja Ruano	Main	Main	Main
Raúl Mérida	Leo	Main	Main	Main
María Cotiello	Nuria	Main	Main	Absent
Roger Coma	Andrés Soria	Main	Main	Absent
Óscar Ladoire	Antonio Ruano	Main^{2}	Main	Main
Maxi Iglesias	Ángel	Absent	Main	Absent
Alicia González Laá	Ana Aroca Rueda	Absent	Recurring	Main
Marta Torné	Julia Redondo	Absent	Absent	Main
Marta Calvó	Madre	Absent	Absent	Main
Javier Mora	Martín	Absent	Absent	Main
Natalia Rodríguez	Michelle	Absent	Absent	Main

- ^1Despite only appearing in one episode ("La Huida"), Angie Cepeda is credited as a series regular.
- ^2Despite having multiple appearances, Óscar Ladoire is only credited as a series regular in episode 13.

== Series overview ==
Season	Episodes	Originally aired		Ratings	
Season	Episodes	Season premiere	Season finale	Spain viewers (millions)	Share
1	13	12 January 2010	12 April 2010	3.36	18.1%
2	14	16 January 2011	17 April 2011	3.02	15.1%
3	14	8 March 2012	13 June 2012	2.14	12.1%

== Episodes ==
=== Season 1 (2010) ===
1. Now What? (¿Y ahora qué?)
2. The Kings Are Coming (Ya vienen los Reyes)
3. Kids Don't Lie (Los niños no dicen mentiras)
4. The Theft (El Robo)
5. The Piñata (El Piñaton)
6. The Mutant (El Mutante)
7. We Are What We Are (Somos lo que somos)
8. The Accident (El Accidente)
9. Close Your Eyes (Cierra los ojos)
10. Secrets and Lemons (Secretos y Limones)
11. Blood Ties (Lazos de Sangre)
12. Make a Wish (Pide un deseo)
13. The Last Day in Valle Perdido (El último día en Valle Perdido)

=== Season 2 (2011) ===
1. Trust Me (Confía en mi)
2. One of Us (Uno de los Nuestros)
3. The Hiding Game (El Juego del Escondite)
4. I Don't Want to Be Normal (No Quiero ser normal)
5. The Light at the End of the Tunnel (La luz al final del tunel)
6. Happy Birthday (Cumpleaños Feliz)
7. Into the Lion's Den (En la boca del Lobo)
8. I'll Never Leave You Alone (Nunca te dejaré solo)
9. The Tin Man (El Hombre de Hojalata)
10. The Witch in the Woods (La Bruja del Bosque)
11. Be careful what you wish for (Cuidado con lo que deseas)
12. Night of the Fire (La Noche del Fuego)
13. Reunion (Part One) (El Reencuentro – 1ª parte)
14. Reunion (Part Two) (El Reencuentro – 2ª parte)

=== Season 3 (2012) ===
1. The Escape (La Huida)
2. 72 Days without You (72 días sin ti)
3. The Hour of the Fairies (La Hora de las Hadas)
4. Do You Want to Be my Boyfriend? (¿Quieres ser mi novio?)
5. The Stressed Fairy (El Hada Estresada)
6. I Love You (Te quiero)
7. Life without Culebra (La Vida sin Culebra)
8. C'est à Paname (C'est à Paname)
9. Fearless (Sin miedo)
10. Wishing Star (La Estrella de los Deseos)
11. Let the Party Begin (Que Empiece la Fiesta)
12. The Power of Desires (El Poder de los Deseos)
13. Invisible Ties (Lazos Invisibles)
14. The Sacrifice (El Sacrificio)
