= H6: Diary of a Serial Killer =

- Directed by: Martín Garrido Barón
- Written by: Martín Garrido
- Produced by: Mark Albela; Denise O'Dell
- Starring: Raquel Arenas; Alejo Sauras; Antonio Mayans
- Cinematography: Sergio Delgado
- Edited by: Samuel Gómez
- Music by: Gaby Jamieson; José Sánchez-Sanz
- Production company: Kanzaman
- Distributed by: Aurum Producciones; Kanzaman
- Release date: 29 April 2005
- Running time: 92 minutes
- Country: Spain
- Language: Spanish
- Budget: € 1.2 Million

H6: Diary of a Serial Killer is a 2006 Spanish horror film directed by Martín Garrido Barón and was written by Martín Garrido.

== Plot ==
H6 tells the story of Antonio Frau, a serial killer set free after serving 25 years in jail for the violent murder of his girlfriend. After inheriting an old motel from a relative he never knew, he sees this as a signal and takes to his holy task of relieving the grief of those who have lost the will to live. He takes his victims to room Number 6 in the motel where he 'purifies' them, while, at the same time, continues his everyday life next to his wife. A mistake leads to his arrest, and his plan to become rich and famous takes relevance.

== Cast ==
- Fernando Acaso as Antonio Frau
- Ángel Alarcón as Francisca's Father
- Raquel Arenas as Rosa
- Ruperto Ares as Pablo
- María José Bausá as Francisca
- Ramón Del Pomar as Curro
- Miquel Fernandez as Antonio Frau
- Martín Garrido as Miguel Oliver
- Antonio Mayans as Dr. Planas
- Sonia Moreno as Tina
- Xènia Reguant as Marisa
- Mark San Juan as Peralta
- Alejo Sauras as Cristóbal
- Elena Seguí as Soledad Mendez
- Miquel Sitjar as Flores

== Release ==
The film premiered on 29 April 2005 as part of the Málaga Film Festival. It was on 3 November 2005 part of the San Sebastián Horror and Fantasy Film Festival and the renovated Festival de Cine Negro de Manresa on 19 November 2005. H6 had a theatrical release in Spain on 7 July 2006 and was in the United States released as direct to video on 21 November 2006.
