= Maderuelo =

- Municipality
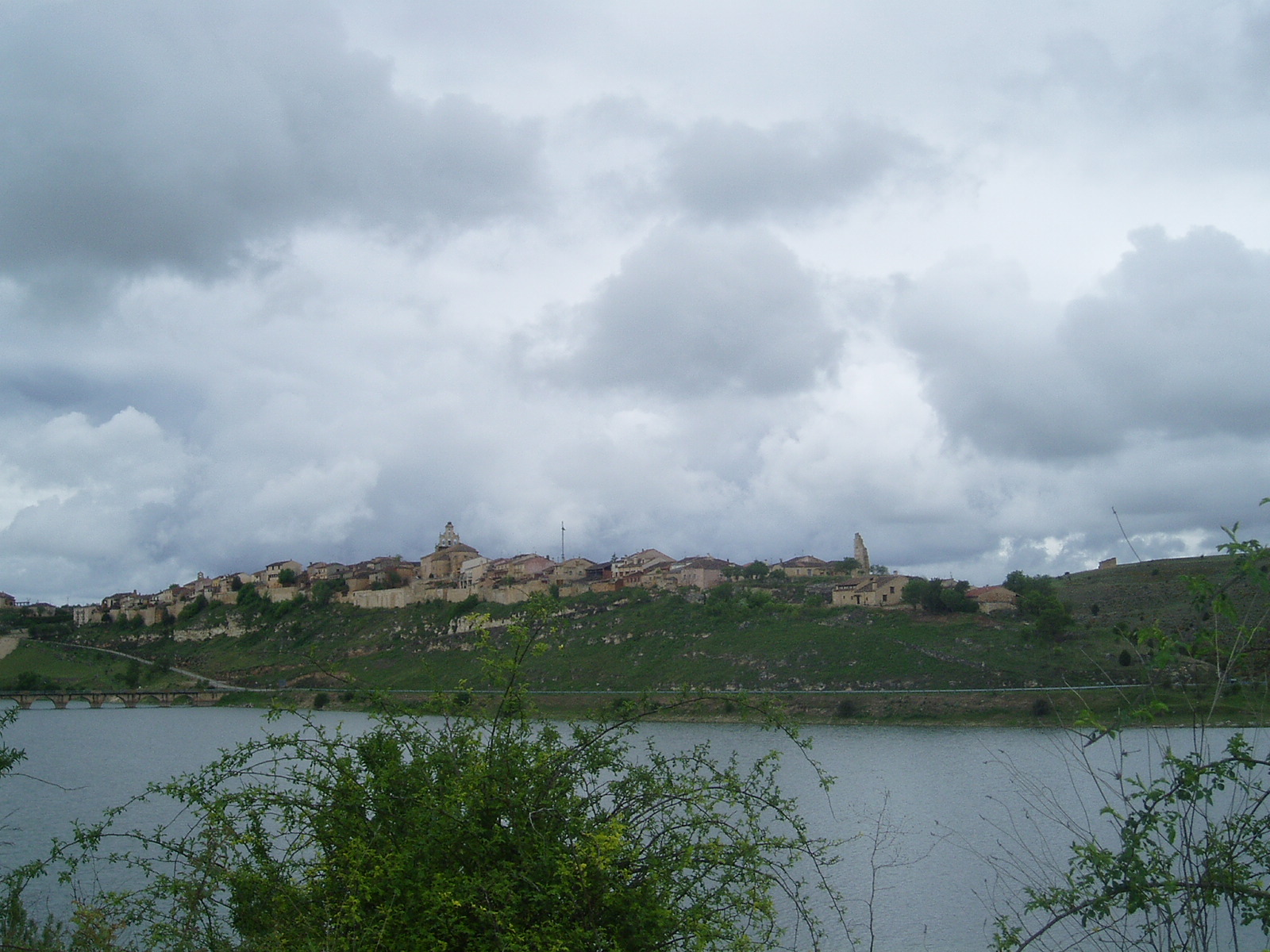
- View of Maderuelo and Pantano de Linares

- Flag Coat of arms

- Location in Spain. Maderuelo (Spain)
- Coordinates: 41°29′14″N 3°31′15″W
- Country: Spain
- Autonomous community: Castile and León
- Province: Segovia
- Municipality: Maderuelo

Area
  - Total: 93 km^{2} (36 sq mi)

Population (2025-01-01)
  - Total: 100
  - Density: 1.1/km^{2} (2.8/sq mi)
- Time zone: UTC+1 (CET)
  - Summer (DST): UTC+2 (CEST)
- Website: Official website

Maderuelo is a municipality in the province of Segovia, Castile and León, Spain. According to the 2004 census (INE), the municipality has 149 inhabitants.

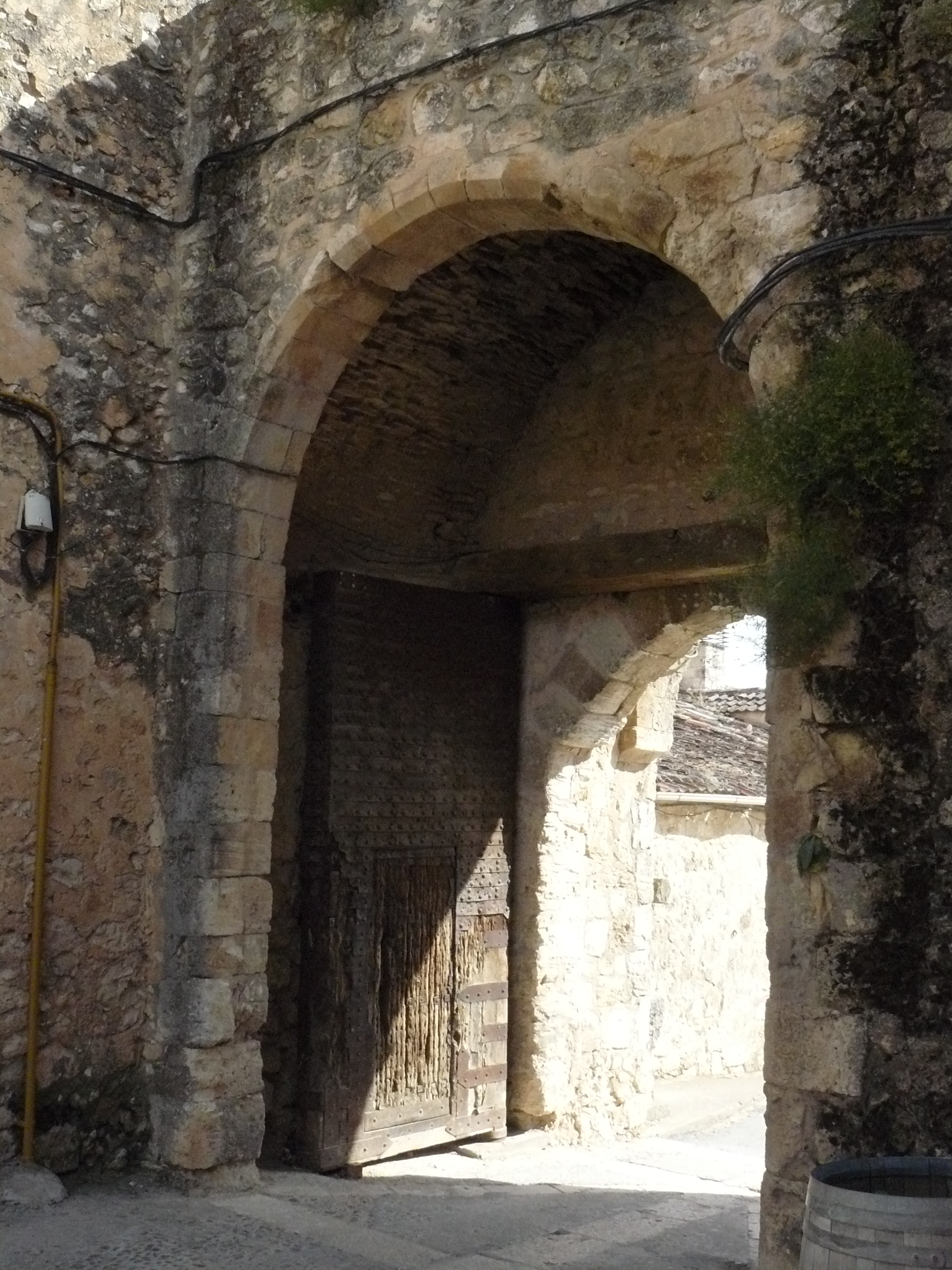
Entrance of the town.

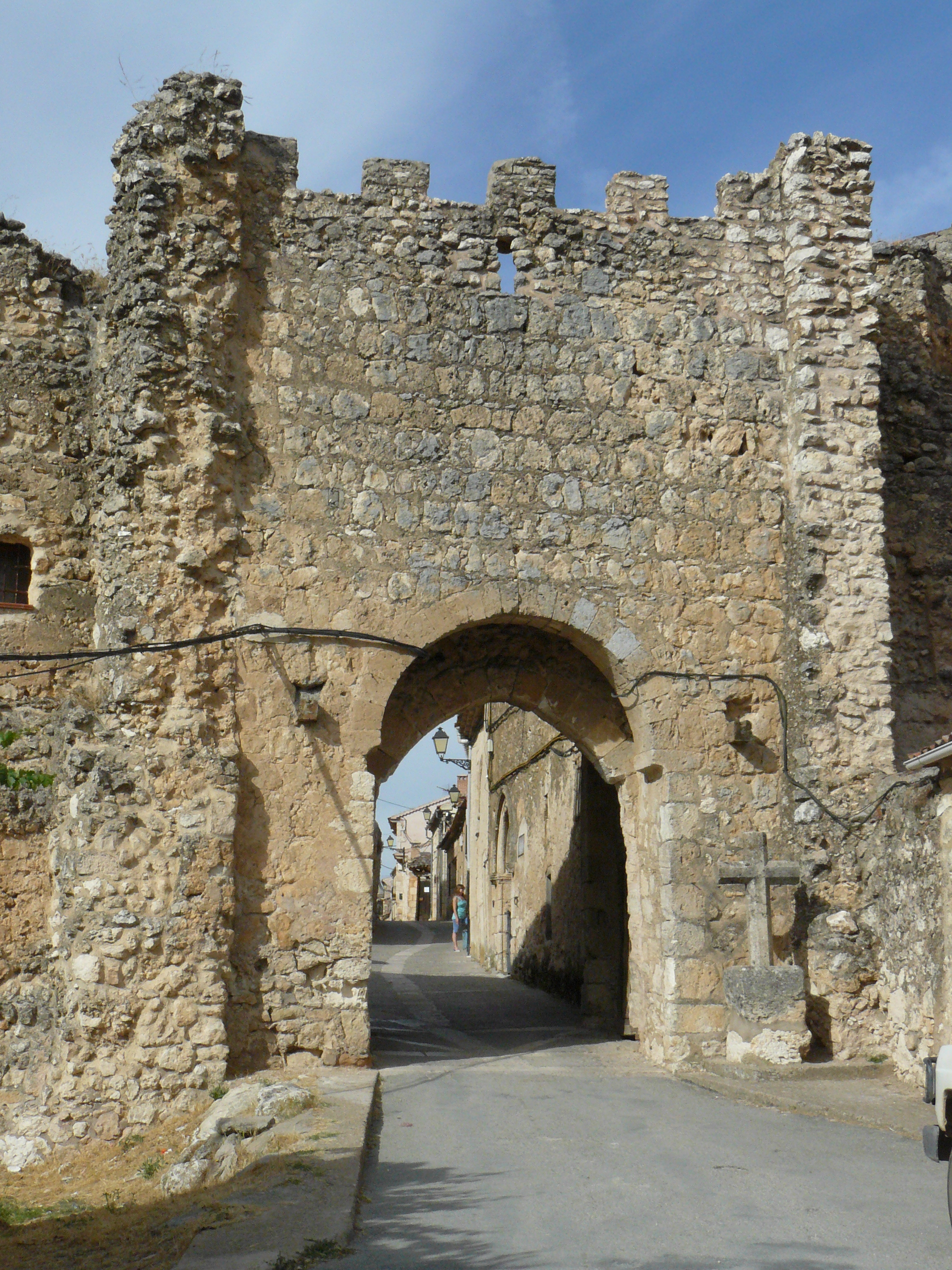
View of the entrance of the town.

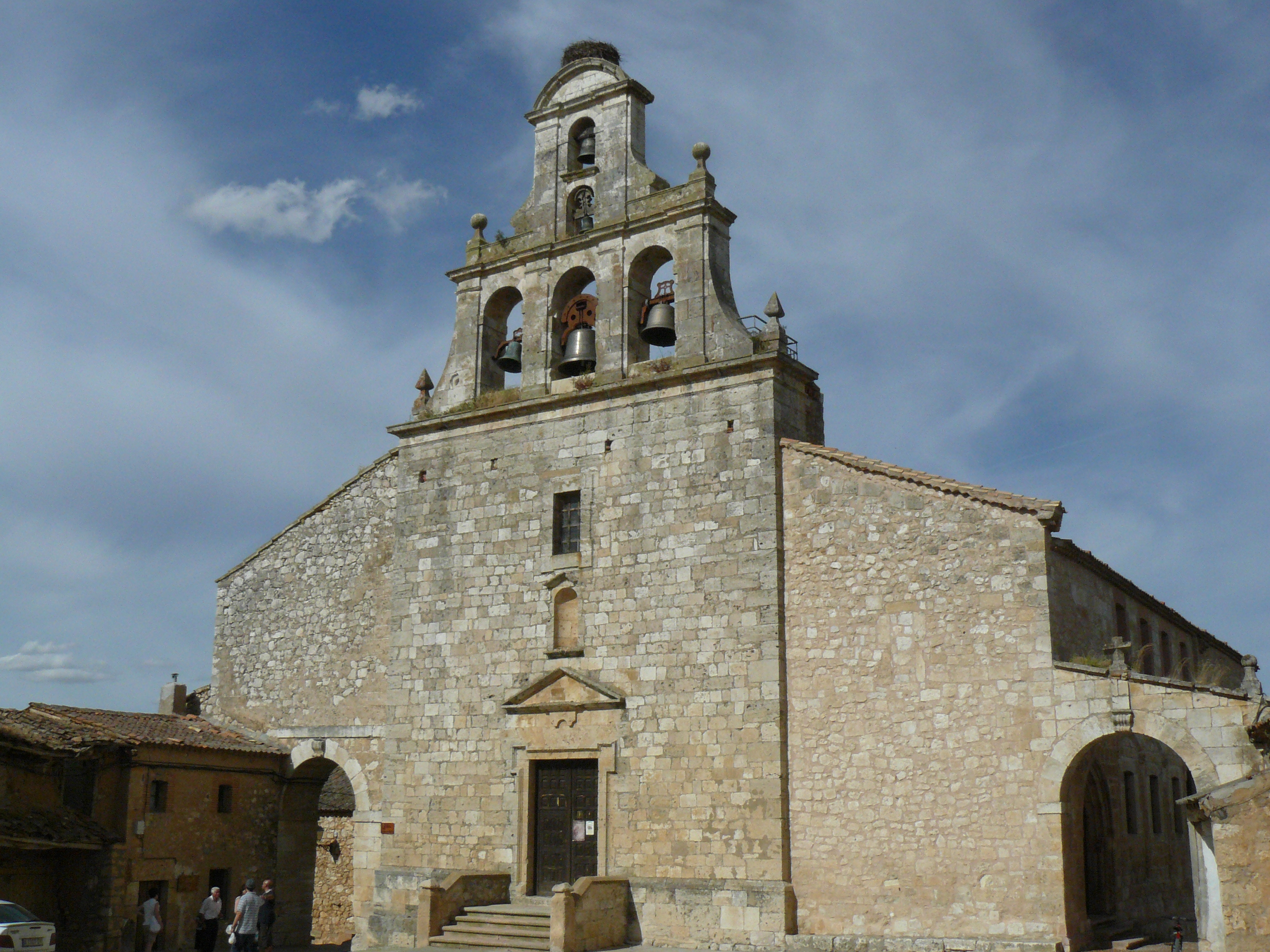
Iglesia de Santa María

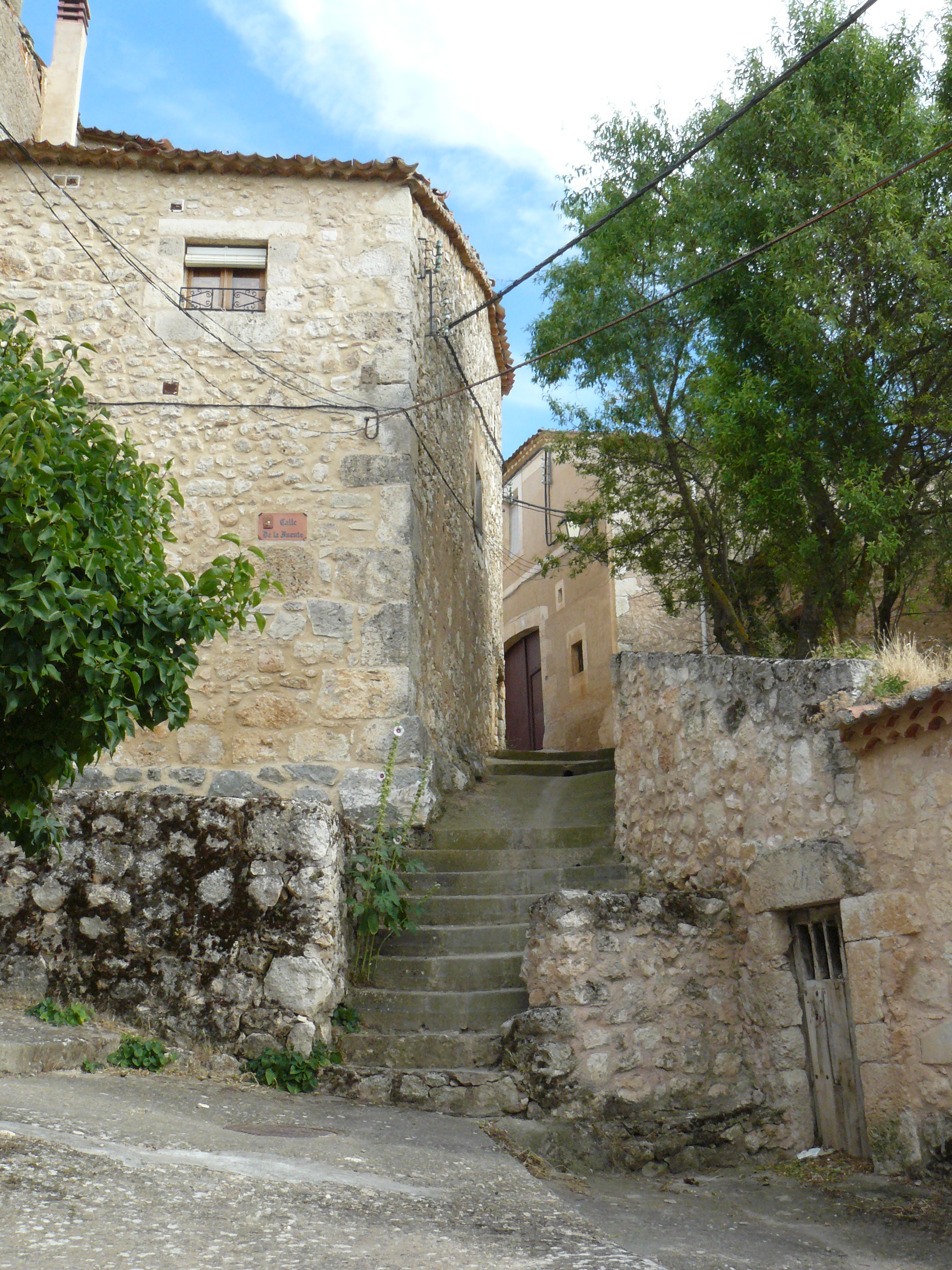
Streets of Maderuelo.

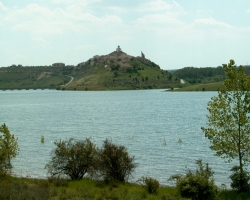
View of Maderuelo with the Linares Reservoir.
