= Sex, Party and Lies =

2009 film by Alfonso Albacete and David Menkes

- Theatrical release poster
- Spanish: Mentiras y gordas
- Directed by: Alfonso Albacete; David Menkes
- Written by: Alfonso Albacete; Ángeles González-Sinde; David Menkes
- Produced by: Gerardo Herrero
- Starring: Mario Casas; Ana de Armas; Yon González; Ana Polvorosa; Marieta Orozco; Miriam Giovanelli; Maxi Iglesias; Duna Jové; Esmeralda Moya; Asier Etxeandia; Hugo Silva; Alejo Sauras
- Cinematography: Alfredo Mayo
- Edited by: Fernando Pardo
- Music by: Juan Sueiro; Juan Carlos Molina
- Production companies: Castafiore Films; Tornasol Films
- Distributed by: Sony Pictures
- Release dates: 7 March 2009 (Las Palmas); 27 March 2009 (Spain)
- Running time: 107 minutes
- Country: Spain
- Language: Spanish
- Budget: €3 million
- Box office: $5.7 million

Sex, Party & Lies (Spanish: Mentiras y gordas, lit. 'Lies... Big Lies') is a 2009 Spanish coming-of-age comedy-drama film directed by Alfonso Albacete and David Menkes, starring Mario Casas, Yon González, Ana Polvorosa, Ana de Armas, Hugo Silva, Maxi Iglesias and Alejo Sauras.

== Plot ==
It is an ensemble film that tells the story of the relationships among a group of young people preparing for what will be the summer of their lives, immersed in a world of nightclubs and parties. Their lives intertwine in a whirlwind of secrets, lies, flings, confusion, sex, alcohol, and drugs, culminating in a tragic ending. Most of them are unaware that, once they embark on this rite-of-passage journey, there is no turning back — and that lies, when they grow, can have disastrous consequences. The backdrop is the city of Alicante, on the shores of the Mediterranean, where the entire story takes place.

== Cast ==
- Mario Casas as Tony
- Ana de Armas as Carola
- Yon González as Nico
- Ana Polvorosa as Marina
- Maxi Iglesias as Pablo
- Marieta Orozco as Sonia
- Alejo Sauras as Bubu
- Hugo Silva as Carlos
- Miriam Giovanelli as Paz
- Asier Etxeandia as Cristo
- Clara Pradas as Rosa
- Esmeralda Moya as Nuria

== Production ==
Sex, Party and Lies is a Tornasol Films and Castafiore Films production. In December 2010, the Ministry of Culture of Spain—then led by Ángeles González Sinde, who had been one of the co-screenwriters of the film five years before becoming minister—granted the film's producing companies €1 million, thus sparking a row of public scrutiny and examination.

== Release ==
The film premiered at the Las Palmas Film Festival in March 2009. Distributed by Sony Pictures, the film was theatrically released in Spain on 27 March 2009. It opened with a box office gross of €1,813,000 in its debut weekend.

== See also ==
- List of Spanish films of 2009
