= Daniel Avilés =

Spanish actor (born 2001)

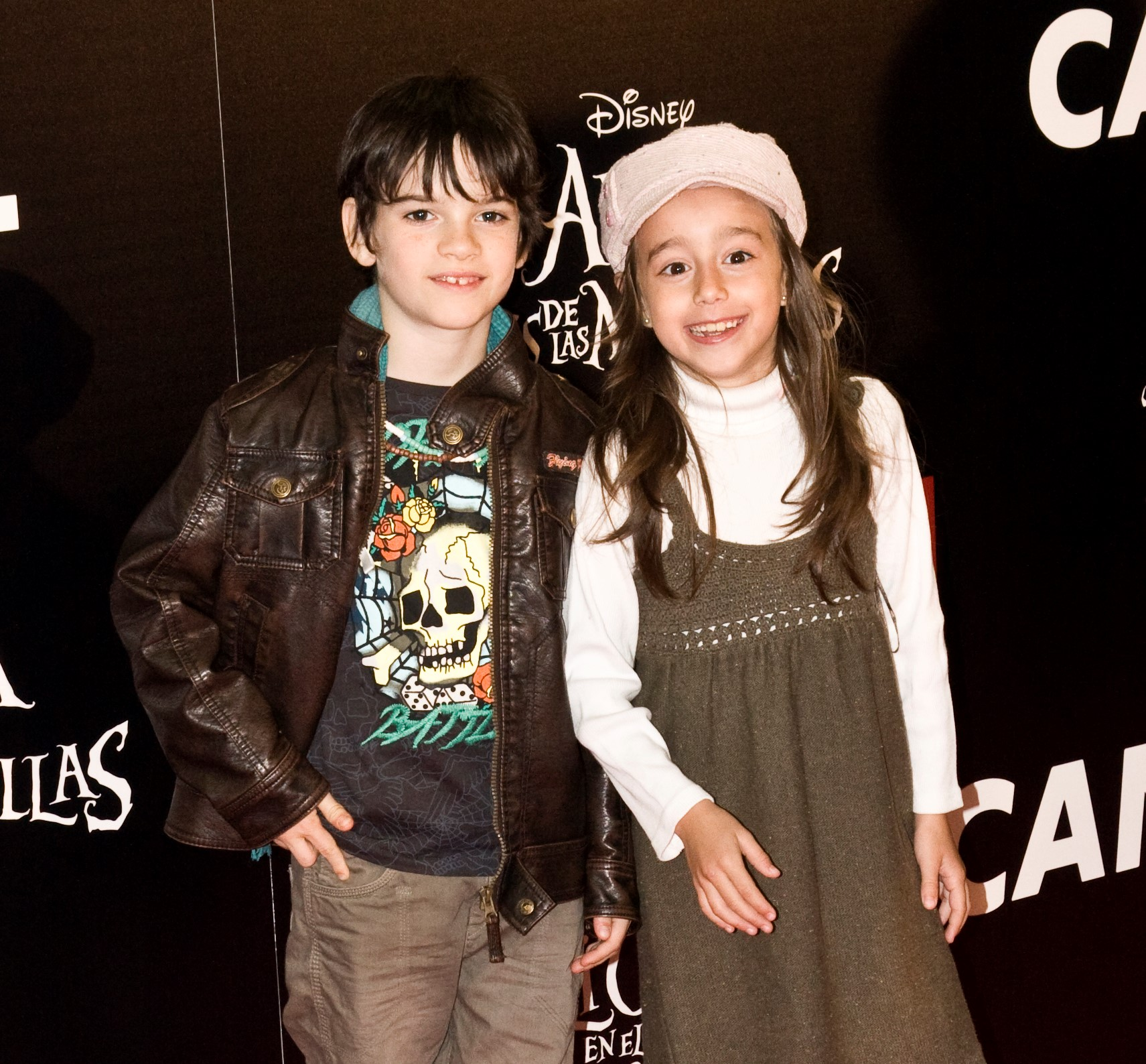
- Daniel Avilés in 2010
- Born: Daniel Avilés Valiente; 4 April 2001 (age 25); Madrid, Spain
- Occupation: actor

Daniel Avilés Valiente (born 4 April 2001) is a Spanish actor, best known for his role of Carlitos in the series Los protegidos.

== Biography ==
After 3 months he made a pilot episode of an educational science program for television, En100rra2, which was never broadcast. Shortly after, he participated in three other short films, Campo de batalla, directed by Fran Casanova, Rascacielos, directed by Mariana Torres and Miedo, directed by Luis San Román. Finally, he was chosen as part of the main cast of the series Los protegidos of Antena 3, in which he participated in the three seasons from 2010 to 2012. He traveled along with his family part of the Camino de Santiago on the French route, on the occasion of the Jacobean Holy Year 2010, for the 13-episode program Cruce de caminos. In 2013, he debuted as Simba in the famous Broadway musical The Lion King.

In April 2013, he signed again for Antena 3 to play Nacho in the series Vivo cantando.

In May 2013 he appeared in the series of Telecinco, El don de Alba acting as Dani, a dead boy who tries to save his sister.

From September 2013 to November 2014 he played Ignacio "Nacho" Ruiz Almagro in the series Vive cantando of Antena 3.

In March 2014, he was in the series Dreamland on Cuatro with a supporting role playing Dani.

In October 2014, her signing for the new comedy of the Antena 3 network, called Algo que celebrar (Something to Celebrate), was confirmed.
