= Paula Prendes =

Spanish actress

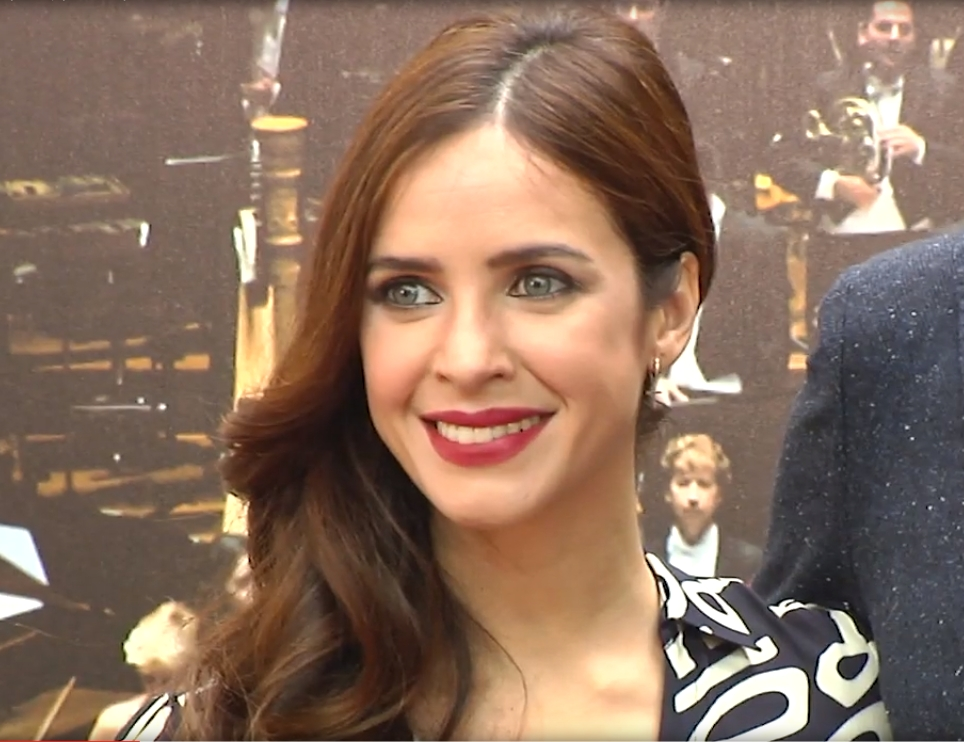
- Paula Prendes in January 2019
- Born: Paula Prendes Martínez; 21 January 1983 (age 43); Gijón, Spain
- Occupation: Actress
- Years active: 2007-present

Paula Prendes Martínez (Gijón, Asturias, January 21, 1983) is a Spanish actress, television presenter and journalist.

== Biography ==
He attended her first studies at the Cabueñes Public School. Later she went on to study at the IES El Piles, also in her hometown, Gijón.

With a degree in Audiovisual Communication from the Universidad Pontificia de Salamanca, Paula Prendes has been an editor and news anchor at SER Gijón, sports at SER Salamanca, news at Localia de Madrid and has been a reporter at El octavo mandamiento, an entertainment program directed by Javier Cárdenas at Localia de Madrid. She has also presented Electronic Arts, a program broadcast on a well-known videogame website and has collaborated as a reporter on MTV.

In television, she has starred in the series Somos cómplices (Antena 3) and Becarios (Telecinco) and has participated in others such as Bicho malo (nunca muere) (Neox), Hermanos y detectives (Telecinco), as well as in the last episode of Los hombres de Paco (Antena 3).

In Periodistas FC she worked as a presenter and reporter of the program together with the presenters Dani Mateo and Ricardo Castella. Since the cancellation of this program, she joined Sé lo que hicisteis..., also in La Sexta. In June of that same year she was on the cover of Primera Línea and in July, of the male magazine FHM.

From 2011 until 2013, she participated in the Antena 3 series Gran Hotel as Cristina Olmedo, being the sister of Julio Olmedo (Yon González). In 2012 she started a new series Imperium, the spin-off of Hispania, la leyenda with Lluís Homar, Nathalie Poza or Ángela Cremonte among others. In November of the same year, she was again on the cover of FHM magazine. In 2013, she gave life to Carolina Jiménez in Gran Reserva: El origen for TVE, prequel to the series Gran Reserva. From 2014 until 2015, she was in the series B&b, de boca en boca for the prime time of Telecinco in which she gave life to Martina.

In May 2015, it was announced her signing with La 1, to host the prime time program Cocineros al volante. In 2016 she signs for the second season of Víctor Ros as the female lead. She also participates in the fourth season of Velvet acting in three episodes. In 2017 she participates in the play La madre que me parió, renewed for a second tour premiered on August 23 of the same year. In July she signs for Zapeando, working on it until 2019, being one of the collaborators of the program.

In April 2018, her participation in the third edition of the MasterChef Celebrity contest was confirmed. The contest was premiered in September and Paula Prendes was the first eliminated. From 2019 to 2021, she presented, with Boris Izaguirre, Prodigios on TVE for three seasons. In October 2019 she joined with a fixed role in the daily series Servir y proteger playing Lara Muñoz.

== Filmography ==
=== Films ===
Year	Title	Character	Directed by	Role
2010	Hollywood	Zoe	Ramón Luque	Secondary role
2011	Fuga de cerebros 2	Sara	Carlos Therón	Main role
2017	Enterrados	Marga	Luis Trapiello	Main role

=== Television series ===
Year	Title	Character	Role
2008	Becarios	Reporter	1 episode
2009	Bicho malo (nunca muere)	Paula	1 episode
2009	Somos cómplices	Andrea Méndez	80 episodes
2010	Los hombres de Paco	Novia de Pepa	1 episode
2011 - 2013	Gran Hotel	Cristina Olmedo	10 episodes
2012	Imperium	Vera	6 episodes
2013	Gran Reserva: El origen	Carolina Jiménez	82 episodes
2013	Águila Roja	Ana	1 episode
2013	Aída	Paula Prendes	1 episode
2014 - 2015	B&b, de boca en boca	Martina Sánchez	29 episodes
2016	Velvet	Adele Lavigne	3 episodes
2016	Víctor Ros	Juana	7 episodes
2019 - 2021	Servir y proteger	Lara Muñoz	450 episodes

=== Theater ===
Year	Title	Character	Role
2013	Love Room	Marta	Main role
2017	La madre que me parió	Natalia	Main role

=== Television programs ===
Year	Title	Channel	Role
2008	El octavo mandamiento	Localia Televisión	Reporter
2010	Periodistas FC	La Sexta	Presenter
2010 - 2011	Sé lo que hicisteis...	La Sexta	Reporter
2015 - 2016	Amigas y conocidas	La 1	Collaborator
2015	Cocineros al volante	La 1	Presenter
2017 - 2019	Zapeando	La Sexta	Collaborator
2018	MasterChef Celebrity	La 1	Contestant: 3rd expelled
2019 - present	Prodigios	La 1	Presenter
2021	Atrápame si puedes	Telemadrid	Contestant: 6th expelled
2023	Maestros de la costura VIP	La 1	Contestant: 5th expelled
