= Hospital Valle Norte =

Spanish television series

- Genre: Medical fiction; Procedural drama
- Directed by: Peris Romano; Juanma Pachón; Marco Castillo
- Starring: Alexandra Jiménez; José Luis Gª Pérez; Juan Gea; Teresa Hurtado de Ory; Gorka Otxoa; Sergio Mur; Lucía Jiménez; Helena Kaittani; Dani Luque; Andreas Muñoz
- Country of origin: Spain
- Original language: Spanish
- No. of seasons: 1
- No. of episodes: 10

Production
- Production companies: RTVE; José Frade PC

Original release
- Network: La 1
- Release: 14 January – 18 March 2019

Hospital Valle Norte is a Spanish medical drama television series that originally aired on La 1 from 14 January to 18 March 2019. The ensemble cast features Alexandra Jiménez and José Luis García Pérez, among others. Produced by RTVE in collaboration with José Frade PC, it was directed by Peris Romano, Juanma Pachón and Marco Castillo.

== Premise ==
It focuses on both the professional and personal mishaps of the workers of the 'Hospital Valle Norte'. The fiction begins with the arrival of Dr. Paula García to lead the hospital's surgical department, clashing with surgeon Héctor Salgado.

== Cast ==
- Alexandra Jiménez as Paula García.
- José Luis García Pérez as Héctor Salgado.
- Juan Gea as Gerardo Valle.
- Teresa Hurtado de Ory as Marta Hoz.
- Gorka Otxoa as Pablo Fuentes.
- Sergio Mur as Jon Mercero.
- Dani Muriel as José Arriero.
- Helena Kaittani as Alejandra.
- Dani Luque as Manuel.
- Andreas Muñoz as Rodrigo.
- Lucía Jiménez as Emma.
- Ángela Cremonte
- Aitor Merino
- Javier Godino
- Natalia Sánchez as Juana.
- Veki Velilla as Alba
- Iker Mazón as Samuel.
- Gracia Olayo as Rosa.
- Rodrigo Poisón
- Adriana Torrebejano
- María Molins as Elena.
- Pilar Cano as Lola.

Guest

- Ramón Langa
- Miguel Hermoso
- Javier Collado
- Sandra Escacena
- Jaime Blanch

== Production and release ==
Hospital Valle Norte was produced by RTVE in collaboration with José Frade PC. The writing team, coordinated by Peris Romano and Xabi Puerta, also featured Ángela Obón, Clara Pérez Escrivá, Ángela Armero, Pablo Barrera, Nico Romero, Bárbara Alpuente, Maite Pérez Astorga, Yaiza Berrocal and Cristina Pons. The 10 episodes were directed by Peris Romano (1, 2, 9 and 10), Juanma Pachón (3, 4, 7 and 8) and Marco Castillo (5 and 6). Shooting began in Madrid towards July 2018. Outdoor shooting locations included Gran Vía, the Calle del Clavel, and the Plaza de Pedro Zerolo in Chueca. The series was presented at the MiM Series Festival in December 2018.

The series premiered on 14 January 2019 on La 1, earning a 9.5% audience share and 1,552,000 viewers in the first episode. Throughout its broadcasting run, the series ended up averaging an unimpressive 8.1% audience share and 1,297,000 viewers, below the channel's average.

No.	Title	Directed by	Original release date
1	"Tiempo cero"	Peris Romano	14 January 2019
2	"Segundo tiempo"	Peris Romano	14 January 2019
3	"Todos muertos"	Juanma Pachón	28 January 2019
4	"Viernes noche"	Juanma Pachón	4 February 2019
5	"Recuérdame"	Marco Castillo	11 February 2019
6	"De padres a hijos"	Marco Castillo	18 February 2019
7	"La vida y la muerte"	Juanma Pachón	25 February 2019
8	"Fantasmas"	Juanma Pachón	4 March 2019
9	"Ropa sucia"	Peris Romano	11 March 2019
10	"La última canción"	Peris Romano	18 March 2019
