= Mamen Camacho =

Spanish actress

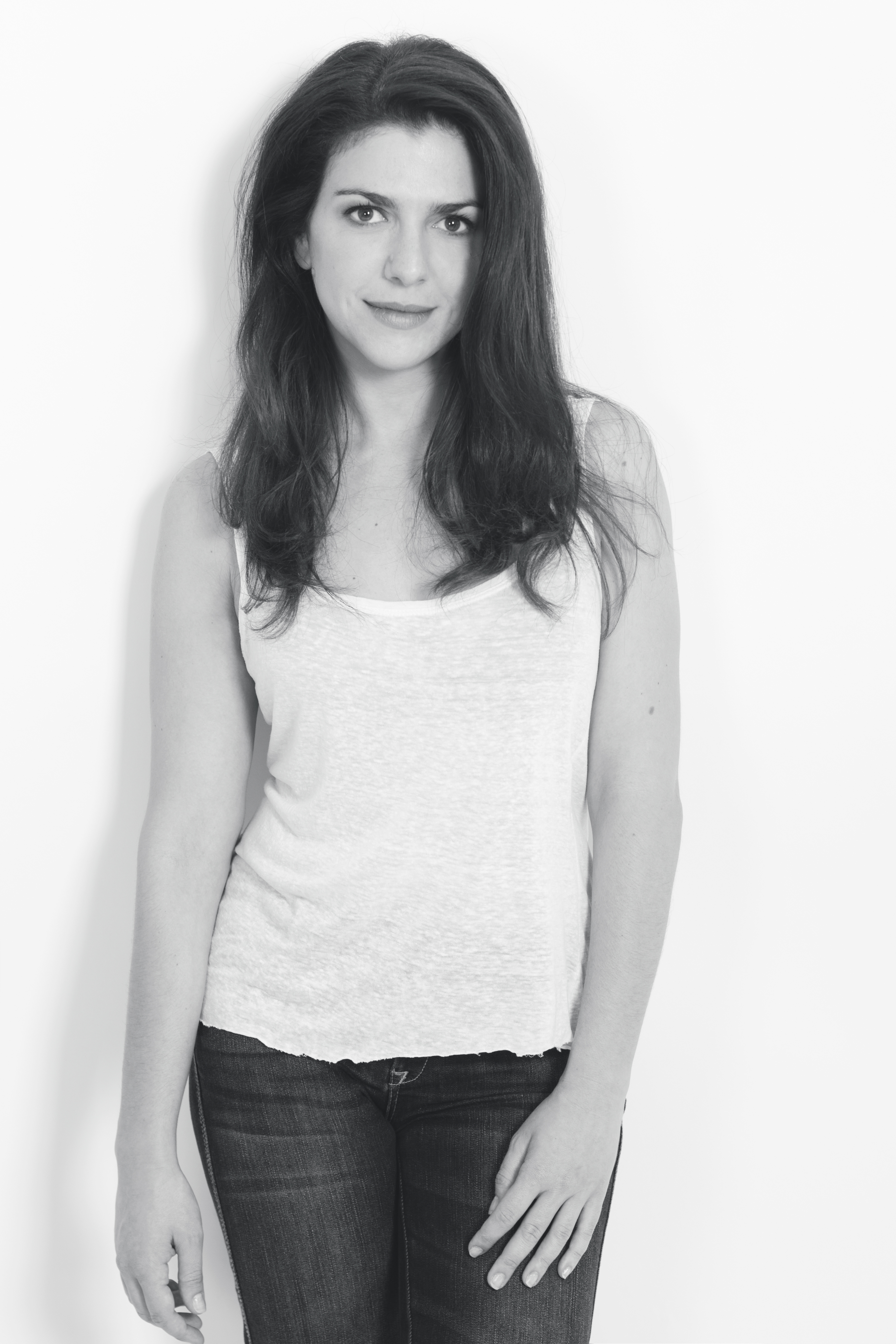
- Born: María del Carmen Camacho Ruiz; 16 December 1980 (age 45); Villacarrillo, Jaén, Spain
- Occupation: Actress
- Years active: 2011-present

Mamen Camacho (born December 16, 1980) is a Spanish actress known for her roles as Rosalía Ortiz in the television series Gran Reserva (and its prequel Gran Reserva: El origen) and Esperanza Beltrán in the daily Servir y proteger, all of them on La 1 of TVE.

In theater she has worked very actively with the Compañía Nacional de Teatro Clásico and with other independent companies such as Venezia Teatro (Casa de Muñecas, 2017), Saraband (Anna Karenina, 2016) or Iraya Producciones (Largo viaje del día hacia la noche, 2014).

== Beginnings ==
At the age of 9, Camacho began studying Spanish Dance at the Luis del Río Conservatory in Córdoba, where she finished her studies in 2003. At the age of 18 she moved to Granada to study Chemistry and in 2003 she began her studies of Textual Interpretation at the Royal School of Dramatic Art. After finishing her studies she completes her training with teachers such as Charo Amador, Will Keen, Tage Larsen, Brigid Panet, Katya Benjamín, Wajdi Mouawad, Fabio Mangolini and Vicente Fuentes.

== Professional career ==
In 2009, she became part of the second class of the Joven Compañía Nacional de Teatro Clásico, in which she starred in La moza de cántaro, by Lope de Vega, directed by Eduardo Vasco and Todo es enredos, amor, by Diego de Figueroa y Córdoba, under the direction of Álvaro Lavín. Subsequently, she has continued in the CNTC playing Plácida in Égloga de Plácida y Vitoriano by Juan del Encina directed by Nacho García and several characters in Entremeses barrocos.

After playing young Rosalía Ortiz in the prime-time series Gran Reserva (TVE), we have been able to see her in its prequel, Gran Reserva: El origen, playing the same character.

Her latest works include Anna Karenina, La vida en tiempos de guerra and Mejor historia que la nuestra, directed by Francesco Carril;the direction of Crónica de una casa real for the Almagro Classical Theater Festival; Haz click aquí, written and directed by José Padilla, at the CDN, El largo viaje del día hacia la noche, directed by Juan José Afonso and Enrique VIII y la Cisma de Inglaterra directed by Nacho García for the Compañía Nacional de Teatro Clásico.

In recent years she has worked with independent theater companies playing great characters such as Nora from Casa de Muñecas with Venezia Teatro directed by José Gómez-Friha, Anna Karenina with Teatro Saraband directed by Francesco Carril and also again with the CNTC with Tisbea in El Burlador de Sevilla, directed by Josep María Mestres.

In 2017, she signed up for the La 1 Servir y proteger in which she plays Esperanza Beltrán (in charge of citizen services and later of the UFAM). In August 2020 it was announced that she was leaving the series after four seasons and 789 episodes. In June 2021 it was announced her return to the series after her maternity leave.

== Filmography ==
=== Television series ===
Year	Title	Character	Channel	Duration
2011 - 2013	Gran Reserva	Rosalía Ortiz	La 1 (TVE)	4 episodes
2013	Gran Reserva: El origen	Rosalía Ortiz	La 1 (TVE)	82 episodes
2017 - 2021	Servir y proteger	Espe	La 1 (TVE)	316 episodes

=== Short films ===
Year	Title	Character	Role
2018	Te quiero	Ella	Main Character

== Awards and nominations ==
Year	Award	Category	Nominated work	Result	Ref.
2018	27th Actors and Actresses Union Awards	Best Television Actress in a Minor Role	Servir y proteger	Nominated	
2026	5th Carmen Awards	Best Supporting Actress	The Exiles	Nominated	
