= Lies and Deceit =

Spanish TV series

- Promotional poster
- Spanish: Mentiras
- Genre: Thriller; Drama; Mystery
- Based on: Liar by Harry Williams and Jack Williams
- Screenplay by: Marina Velázquez; Javier San Román; Tatiana Rodríguez; Camino López
- Directed by: Norberto López Amado; Curro Novallas
- Starring: Ángela Cremonte; Javier Rey
- Country of origin: Spain
- Original language: Spanish
- No. of seasons: 1
- No. of episodes: 6

Production
- Executive producers: Curro Novallas; Sonia Martínez
- Production company: Atresmedia Studios

Original release
- Network: ATRESplayer Premium
- Release: 19 April 2020

Lies and Deceit (Spanish: Mentiras; lit. 'Lies') is a Spanish thriller drama television series consisting of a remake of the British series Liar. The series stars Ángela Cremonte and Javier Rey. It aired in 2020 on Atresplayer Premium.

== Premise ==
Set in the island of Mallorca, the plot follows Laura Munar (Ángela Cremonte), a high school literature teacher who has dinner with Xavier Vera (Javier Rey), a noted surgeon. She wakes up unwell the morning after, suspecting she had been drugged and raped.

== Cast ==
- Ángela Cremonte as Laura Munar.
- Javier Rey as Xavier Vera.
- Manuela Velasco as Cata.
- Miquel Fernández as Iván
- Víctor Duplá as Sergio
- Itziar Atienza as Daniela
- Paco Tous as Silva
- Susi Sánchez as Teresa
- Óscar Ortuño as Lucas
- Sofía Oria as Amal
- Rubén de Eguía as Ricard
- Eva Llorach
- Khaled Kouka
- Clara Segura
- Alejandra Lorente
- Fran Cantos
- Agnès Llobet
- Jorge Kent
- Sara Moraleda
- Pedro Freijeiro
- Rodrigo Sáenz de Heredia

== Production and release ==
Produced by Atresmedia Studios, Mentiras is an adaptation of the British series Liar, created by Harry and Jack Williams for ITV and Sundance TV. The shooting started by November 2019 and it took place in between Madrid and Mallorca, the series consists of six 50-minute long episodes. Marina Velázquez, Javier San Román, Tatiana Rodríguez and Camino López were charged with the adapted screenplay whereas Norberto López Amado and Curro Novallas directed the episodes. The series premiered on Atresplayer Premium on 19 April 2020, ending its broadcasting run on 24 May 2020. The series began a free-to-air run on Antena 3 on 12 January 2022.

Series	Episodes	Originally released			Ref.
Series	Episodes	First released	Last released	Network	Ref.
1	6	19 April 2020	24 May 2020	Atresplayer Premium	

No. in season	Title	Original release date
1	"¿Me crees?"	19 April 2020
2	"Consecuencias"	26 April 2020
3	"No sirve de nada"	3 May 2020
4	"¿A cuántas más?"	10 May 2020
5	"La Verdad"	17 May 2020
6	"Estamos muy cerca"	24 May 2020
