= Somos cómplices =

Spanish television series

- Genre: Soap opera; Telenovela
- Based on: Cómplices by Víctor Carrasco
- Country of origin: Spain
- Original language: Spanish
- No. of seasons: 1

Production
- Production location: Province of Málaga
- Production company: Linze TV

Original release
- Network: Antena 3; Nova
- Release: 15 September 2009

Somos cómplices is a Spanish daily television series adapting the Chilean telenovela Cómplices. It began airing on 15 September 2009. The original broadcasting run on Antena 3 during the sobremesa slot was swiftly cancelled and moved to Nova.

== Premise ==
An American man, Harvey Slater, son to millionaires, is told to actually be an adopted son. He thus moves to Spain to find his biological family, only to be conned there by Soledad Méndez, who forges an entire family, the Altamirano, in order to get Harvey's money.

== Cast ==
- Cristina Peña as Soledad Méndez.
- Martijn Kuiper as Harvey Slater.
- Aleix Albareda as Gerardo Porras.
- Larry Hagman as Richard Slater.
- Paula Prendes as Andrea Méndez.
- Bruno Squarcia as Antonio García.
- Lucía Hoyos as Marta Moya.
- María Cantuel as Macarena Martí.
- Xisco Segura as Mario Palacios.
- Nuria Benet as Virginia Soler.
- María Luisa Merlo as Cecilia Rodríguez.
- Karmele Aranburu as Lía Espinoza.
- Javier Márquez as Javier Carmona.
- Belinda Washington as Susana Gónzalez-Avilés.
- María Sanz as Rita Fernández.
- Sergio Arce as Marcos García.
- Marta Eguía as Laura García.
- Sara Rivero as Amanda Múgica.
- Paloma Arimón as Alejandra Flores.
- Guadalupe Lancho as Emilia Fajardo.
- Richard Collins-Moore as Manuel Rosales.
- Jorge Roelas as Bernardo Martí.
- Cristina Molina as Juana López.

== Production and release ==
An adaptation of the Chilean telenovela Cómplices written by Víctor Carrasco, Somos cómplices was produced by Linze TV for Antena 3. Shooting locations included a film set in Coín, province of Málaga. Only two episodes aired in September 2009 on Antena 3, after which the remaining episodes were moved to Nova due to the underwhelming start in terms of viewership ratings: 853,000 viewers and a 6.8% share for the first episode broadcast on 15 September and 714,000 viewers and a 5.7% share for the second episode broadcast on 16 September.
