= Sergio Mur =

Spanish film and television actor

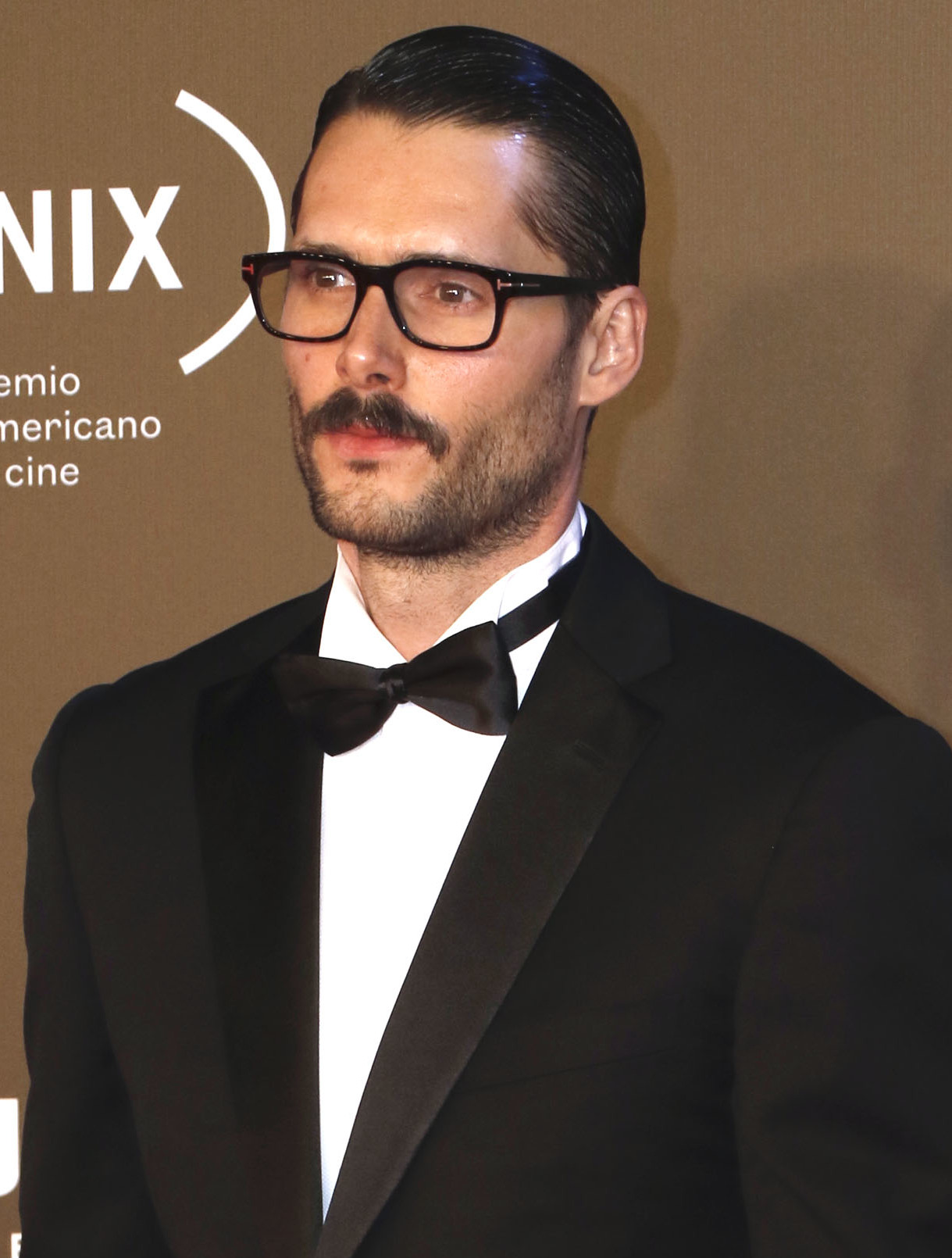
- Mur in 2017
- Born: Sergio Mur López; 23 May 1977 (age 47); Madrid, Comunidad de Madrid, Spain
- Occupation: Actor
- Years active: 2000-present
- Spouse: Olivia Molina
- Children: 2

Sergio Mur López (born 23 May 1977 in Madrid, Comunidad de Madrid, Spain), is a Spanish television actor.

== Filmography ==
=== Films ===
Year	Title	Role	Notes
2000	El grito de Munch	Pablo	Short film
2004	En Nochebuena con los Lunnis y sus amigos	Himself	Television film
2005	Interior (noche)	Alex	
2008	Connecting People		Video short
2010	Lluvia: Sóner records	José	Short film
2010	Arriba & abajo		Video short
2011	Muertos y vivientes	Héroe	Short film
2011	3,2 (lo que hacen las novias)	Él	Short film
2013	The Covered Human		Short film
2014	Shooting for Socrates	Socrates	

=== Television roles ===
Year	Title	Roles	Notes
2002–2003	20tantos	Manu Ambrán	Recurring role; 5 episodes
2003	El comisario	Unknown role	Episode: "Pasión kurda"
2005	Un paso adelante	Carlos	Episode: "El telegrama"
2006–2007	SMS, sin miedo a soñar	Pedro	Main role (seasons 1–2); 85 episodes
2008	Sin tetas no hay paraíso	Soria	Recurring role (season 2); 12 episodes
2009	Arrayán	Alberto	Recurring role; 15 episodes
2009–2010	Cuéntame cómo pasó	Javier	Recurring role (season 12); 7 episodes
2010	Los protegidos	Unknown role	Episodes: "Somos lo que somos" and "Último día en valle perdido"
2010	Física o química	Jorge	Recurring role (season 6); 21 episodes
2011	Aída	Martín	Episode: "Esta casa es una ruina"
2013	Gran Reserva: El origen	Roberto Vega	Recurring role; 82 episodes
2014	Los misterios de Laura	Daniel Molina	Episode: "Laura y el misterio del pasajero preocupado"
2014	Reina de corazones	Patricio Picasso "El Supremo" / Gregorio Pérez / Fernando San Juan	Main role; 103 episodes
2015–2016	El Señor de los Cielos	Tim Rawlings	Recurring role (seasons 3–4); 120 episodes
2017	Ella es tu padre	Damián	Episode: "Yo, mi, me, conmigo"
2017	La que se avecina	Guillermo	Episode: "Un bypass, un conserje titulado y un mayorista zulú"
2017	Cable Girls	Mario Pérez	Main role (season 2); 16 episodes
2017	Corta!	Assistente	Recurring role; 25 episodes
2017–2018	Papá a toda madre	Jorge	Main role; 96 episodes
2018–2019	14 de abril. La República	León Caneda	Main role (seasons 1–2); 7 episodes
2018	Mi propósito eres tú	Teodoro "Teo" Hidalgo Flores	Television special
2019	Hospital Valle Norte	Jon Mercero	Main role; 10 episodes
2019	Doña Flor y sus dos maridos	Teodoro "Teo" Hidalgo Flores	Main role; 70 episodes
2019-?	Servir y proteger	Miguel Herrera «Caimán»	Main role; ? episodes
2020-2021	The Idhun Chronicles	Kirtash	Main role; 10 episodes; voice
