= Lucía Hoyos =

Spanish model, actress and tv show host

Lucía Hoyos (born 5 March 1975) is a Spanish actress, TV vistes and model.

== Biography ==
She was born in Seville on March 5th 1975, and she began her career when she was chosen Miss of her hometown in 1994. From this moment on she bécame a known face both in cinemas and television.

In 1999 her actIng career launched with her role in the TV show Journalists, and later on appeared in many other shows like Petra Delicate, Paradise, Ana and the 7 or Policemen, In the Heart of the Street.

Lately she acted in some short films like You carry it (2004), #Cyclops (2009), and in films like The Syndrome of Svensson (2006) or 4000 euros (2008).

In the year 2008 she played main roles in two series of television broadcast by Channel South: Put me a cloud and Rocío, almost mother. A year later she was the protagonist of “We Are accomplices, a tv show broadcast by Antenna 3 Channel, that was cancelled in the second season for lack of audience. There were 80 extra episodios that could be seen on channel Nova. In 2015 she participated in the TV series Down there, playing Eugenia Benjumea.

In television she has collaborated in The Program of Ana Rosa, Wanna bet?, Don't Shoot the Pianist, and has been a guest on Pasapalabra many times. In 2006 she hosted at Telecinco in The program of summer, in 2001 she presented this won’t ever be a cultures tv show and in 2003 Summer 3 in Channel South.

On 7 January 2016 Lucía became a contestant in the Spanish version of Celebrity Big Brother.

== Filmography ==
=== Films ===
Year	Film	Paper	Notes
2004	You carry it	Lucía	Short film
2006	The Syndrome of Svensson	Messenger	Secondary
2008	4000 euros	Carmen	Protagonist
2009	#Cyclops	Méndez	Short film
2011	North witch	Iria	Secondary
2013	Crazy with crossbow	Ertzaintza	Short film
2013	Where they are the keys?	Mónica	Short film
2013	The Wheel	Lorraine	Protagonist

=== Series ===
Year	Series	Chain	Paper	Notes
1999	Periodistas	Telecinco	Loli	1 episode
2000	Paradise	La 1	Susana	1 episode
2002	Ana y los 7	La 1	Eugenia	1 episode
2005	Mis adorables vecinos	Antena 3	Lucía	1 episode
2008	Ponme una nube	Canal Sur	Lola	22 episodes
2008	Impares	Antena 3	Lucía	2 episodes
2008	Rocío, casi madre	Canal Sur	Lola	15 episodes
2009	Dias sin Luz	Antena 3	Choral	2 episodes (Miniseries)
2009	Somos cómplices	Antena 3	Marta Moya	80 episodes
2011	Carmina	Telecinco	Blanca	1 episode (Miniseries)
2011	Historias robadas	Antena 3	Lucía	2 episodes (Miniseries)
2013	Flaman	Canal Sur	Eva	14 episodes
2014	Malviviendo	Webserie	Inma Mountains	1 episode
2015	Allí abajo	Antena 3	Eugenia Benjumea	3 episodes

=== Programs of television ===
Year	Program	Chain	Notes
2000	Macumba Te	Telemadrid	Collaborator
2000–2001	Casi todo a cien	Telemadrid	Host
2001	Nunca seremos un programa de culto	Telemadrid	Host
2001–2014	Pasapalabra	Antena 3 / Telecinco	Guest (32 occasions)
2002	Musical 3	Antena 3	Reporter
2003	Verano 3	Antena 3	Host
2005–2006	El programa de Ana Rosa	Telecinco	Co-host
2007	XXI Annual Goya Awards	La 1	Sworn
2009	No disparen al pianista	La 2	Collaborator
2009	Password	Cuatro	Guest (3 occasions)
2016	Big Brother VIP 4	Telecinco	Contestant
