= Jesús Olmedo =

Spanish actor

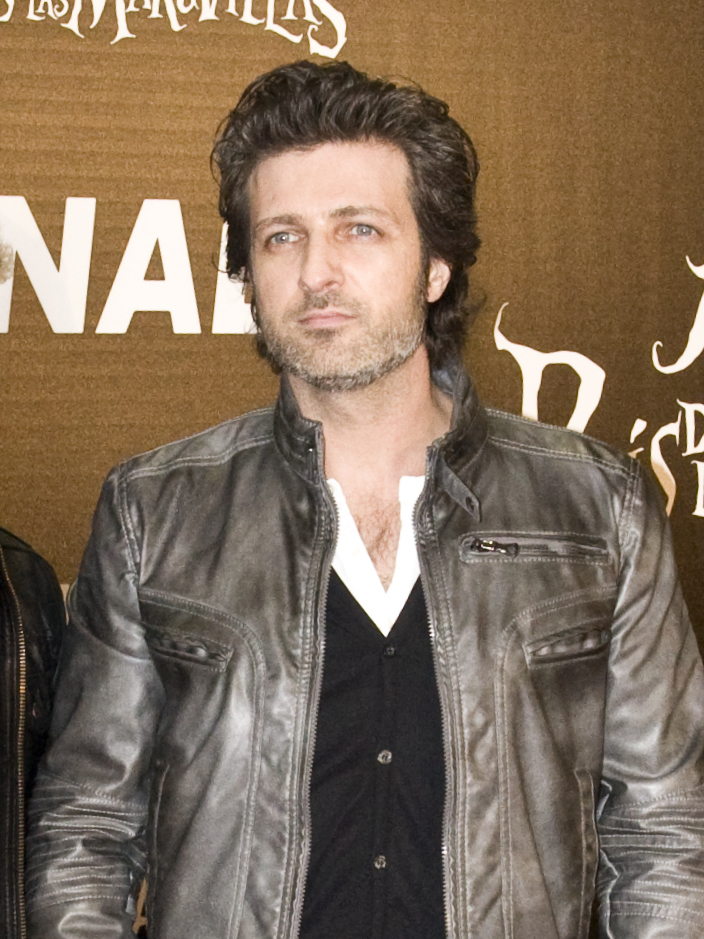
- (2010)
- Born: 6 or 7 October 1973 (age 52); Seville, Spain
- Occupation: Actor

Jesús Olmedo (born 1973) is a Spanish actor, best known for his performance in the television series Hospital Central, 90-60-90: Diario secreto de una adolescente, Hispania, la leyenda and Imperium.

== Biography ==
Born in Seville on 6 or 7 October 1973, Olmedo landed his first role in 1997 in the television series Hostal Royal Manzanares. After his performance in the former, he resumed collaboration with Lina Morgan in the series Academia de baile Gloria. His television career consolidated with his performance in the 2001 telenovela Esencia de poder, earning further popularity for his role in the television series Hospital Central. He then starred as Bruno in the 2009 series 90-60-90, diario secreto de una adolescente. (Note: His performance earned him the 2009 GQ Men Award to Best New Actor.) After performing the role of Marco in Hispania, la leyenda (2010–2012) and Imperium (2012), initially as villainous Roman general, later turned into a slave and gladiator, Olmedo starred in the daily television series Gran Reserva. El origen, Amar es para siempre, Centro médico and Mercado central.

Rather known for his television performances, his films credits include minor performances in Noviembre, Recambios, 15 días contigo, 8 citas, and the role of 'Chambelán' in the two movies of La herencia Valdemar.

== Filmography ==
Television

Year	Title	Role	Notes	Ref
1997	Hostal Royal Manzanares	Pablo	Recurring	
2001	Esencia de poder	Diego Rivera	Main	
2001	Academia de baile Gloria	Asun's (Gloria) son	Main	
2005	Aquí no hay quien viva	Ricardo	Recurring. Season 3	
2005–2009	Hospital Central	Carlos Granados	Main. 4 seasons. 118 episodes	
2009	90-60-90, diario secreto de una adolescente	Bruno Varela	Main	
2010–2012	Hispania, la leyenda	Marco	Main	
2012	Imperium	Marco	Reprise of his role in Hispania	
2013	Gran Reserva. El origen	Jesús Miranda	Main	
2015	Amar es para siempre	Dante Ranieri	Main. Season 3	
2015–2019	La que se avecina	Diego Arrivas Palomares	Recurring	
2017–2018	Centro médico	Dr. Molina	Main	
2019	Lope enamorado	Lope de Vega	TV movie	
2019–2021	Mercado central	Jorge Santos	Main	
