= Servir y proteger =

Television series

- Genre: Police drama; Soap opera
- Created by: Tirso Calero
- Starring: Luisa Martín; Roberto Álvarez; Unax Ugalde; Thais Blume; Alberto Jiménez; Natalia Rodríguez; Mamen Camacho; Jimmy Castro; Juan Díaz; Candela Serrat; Karina Kolokolchykova; Caterina Mengs; Verónika Moral; Berta Galo; Santi Marín; Jorge Silvestre; Pepa Aniorte; Juan Carlos Vellido; Guadalupe Lancho; Pablo Puyol; Elena Ballesteros; Juanjo Artero
- Music by: Paco Musulén; Juan Carlos Cuello
- Country of origin: Spain
- Original language: Spanish
- No. of seasons: 7
- No. of episodes: 1372 (13 January 2023)

Production
- Running time: 55 minutes approx.
- Production company: Plano a Plano for Televisión Española

Original release
- Network: La 1
- Release: 24 April 2017 – 16 January 2023

Servir y proteger (transl. 'Serve and protect') is a Spanish police drama soap opera produced by Plano a Plano for Televisión Española. The series premiered on La1 on 24 April 2017. It tells the daily routine of a CNP police station on Madrid.

The first season was broadcast from 24 April 2017 to 15 February 2018 and the soap opera was renewed in late 2017 for a second season which started on February 16. It was renewed for a third season in May 2018. A fourth season was approved in June 2019. It was renewed for a fifth season in August 2020. A sixth season was approved in June 2021. A seventh season was approved in May 2022. In September 2022, TVE announced that this season would be its last, and the series finale took place on 16 January 2023.

== Plot ==
The series is about the day to day of a police station in a neighbourhood south of Madrid. The cases investigated by police officers are less serious offenses, although they have a great impact on the lives of those affected: small conflicts of a social nature, with immigrants, evictions, or violence against women. With the police station as the centre of the plot, it shows the characters, their problems, anxieties, hopes and joys.

== Cast ==
Current main cast

Actor	Character	Episodes
Luisa Martín	Claudia Miralles Rodríguez	1 -
Roberto Álvarez	Antonio Torres Morales	1 -
Unax Ugalde	Matías Medina	1263 -
Thais Blume	Lidia Alonso Merino	814 -
Alberto Jiménez	Néstor Cepeda	873 -
Natalia Rodríguez	Yolanda Herrero	1003 - 1239 / 1286 -
Mamen Camacho	Esperanza "Espe" Beltrán García	1 - 789 / 1007 -
Jimmy Castro	Carlos Okoye	826 -
Juan Díaz	Gael Cruz	1256 -
Candela Serrat	Julia Riaza	1256 -
Karina Kolokolchykova	Hanna Yushenko	816 - 980 / 1031 - 1037 / 1128 -
Caterina Megs	Catalina "Cata" Cruz	1254 -
Verónika Moral	Andrea Vega	1021 -
Berta Galo	Iris Quiroga	1251 -
Santi Marín	Fabián Soto	1268 -
Jorge Silvestre	Saúl Galván Padilla	1270 -
Pepa Aniorte	María López Capellán	1 -
Juan Carlos Vellido	Isidro Galván	1268 -
Guadalupe Lancho	Noemí Padilla	1268 -
Pablo Puyol	Félix Durán	1013 -
Elena Ballesteros	Carolina "Carol" Hidalgo Rojas	1067 -
Juanjo Artero	Emilio Bremón	1 -

Departed main cast

Actor	Character	Episodes
Nausicaa Bonnín	Laura Escalada López †	2 - 137
Miguel Ortiz	Máximo "Max" Fernández	2 - 147
Miguel Hermoso	Martín Díez Prieto	4 - 199
Mina El Hammani	Salima Ben Ahmed	1 - 200
Juan José Ballesta	Roberto "Rober" Batista Vega †	1 - 200
Emilio Palacios	Jairo Batista Vega †	1 - 266
Paco Manzanedo	Cayetano "Tano" Céspedes †	204 - 319
Raúl Olivo	Alexander "Alejandro" Somoza †	207 - 345
Celia Freijeiro	Teresa Ronda Escobedo	202 - 360
Albert Baró	David Merino Lafuente	201 - 374
Adriá Collado	Jesús Merino	201 - 374
Nicolás Coronado	Sergio Mayoral †	1 - 162 / 293 - 400
Antonio Dechent	Tote Gallardo	364 - 400
Elisa Mouliaá	Dolores "Lola" Ramos Jiménez	1 - 390 / 498 - 501
Pau Colera	Pablo Baeza Rodríguez †	404 - 503
Jimmy Barnatán	Federico "Fede" Alarcón †	201 - 495 / 535
Tito Asorey	Luis Campos Soler †	401 - 589
Antonio Garrido	Damián Pérez	404 - 593
Susana Béquer	Montserrat "Montse" Ibarra Goikoetxea †	2 - 595
Samuel Viyuela	Ricardo "Ricky" Campos Soler †	402 - 600
Marta Belmonte	Silvia Orestes	408 - 654
José Lamuño	Álvaro Campos Soler	402 - 655
Marta Calvó	Elvira Soler	403 - 655
Lara Martorell	Ángela Betanzos	532 - 714
Edurne	Sara Barrios	401 - 540 / 655 - 740
Maru Valdivielso	Mercedes "Merche" Zamora	421 - 590 / 727 - 774
Patxi Freytez	Andrés Coll †	602 - 774
Chechu Salgado	Ramón Rojo Hernández †	651 - 791
Alejandra Lorente	Nerea Ocaña	203 - 369 / 802 - 804
Aníbal Soto	Marcelino Ocaña Sánchez	1 - 478 / 592 - 595 / 802 - 806
Alejandro Jato	Antonio "Toni" Ríos Gómez	404 - 820
María Molins	Verónica Figueras	601 - 785 / 825 - 830
Dani Muriel	Mateo Bremón	601 - 830
Sergio Mur	Miguel Herrera Ramos «Caimán»	604 - 861
Fernando Guillén-Cuervo	Elías Guevara Martos	1 - 872
Silvia Sanabria	Ignacia "Nacha" Aguirre Rueda †	1 - 811 / 921 - 932
Alfonso Lara	Joaquín Rodríguez	825 - 962
Diego Klein	Ángel Moreno Hernández	809 - 962
Vania Villalón	Daniela Moreno Hernández	807 - 968
Armando del Río	David Pineda Jiménez / Ramiro Infante Holgado †	958 - 1000
Cristina Abad	Paula Bremón Figueras	607 - 1005
Antonio Valero	Tomás Salgado	801 - 1006
Cayetana Cabezas	Eva Velasco Martínez †	801 - 1011 / 1016
Paula Prendes	Lara Muñoz	622 - 1072
Ignacio Montes	Jaime Bustos «Jota»	1021 - 1144
Lucía Martín Abello	Beatriz Velasco Martínez / Blanca Alonso Merino	868 - 1144
Fernando Soto	Rubén Redondo †	1043 - 1226
Luis Fernández	Iván Díaz	808 - 1238
Raquel Meroño	Martina Salvador †	1044 - 1245
Emmanuel Esparza	Víctor Salas †	1002 - 1248
Andrea del Río	Alicia Ocaña Nieto †	1 - 478 / 765 - 800 / 1247 - 1249
Eduardo Velasco	Fernando Quintero Gómez †	2 - 288 / 385 - 1249
Sandra Martín	Patricia "Paty" Fernández	7 - 147 / 201 - 1079 / 1245 - 1249
Denisse Peña	Olga Torres Miralles	1 - 182 / 267 - 500 / 703 - 710 / 730 / 803 - 806 / 1208 / 1214 / 1228 - 1255
Javier Abad	Julio Quintero	207 - 362 / 467 - 500 / 557 - 560 / 803 - 806 / 1062 - 1066 / 1235 - 1255
Esmeralda Moya	Luna Requena	1134 - 1261
Ángel de Miguel	Iker Lemos	202 - 478 / 798 / 807 / 1171 - 1261
Claudia Roset	Sheila Barroso	1025 - 1267

== Awards and nominations ==
Year	Award	Category	Nominee(s)	Result	Ref.
2021	8th MiM Series Awards	Best Daily Series		Won	

== See also ==
- Radiotelevisión Española
- Television in Spain
- Seis Hermanas
