= Briones, La Rioja =

Briones
- Municipality
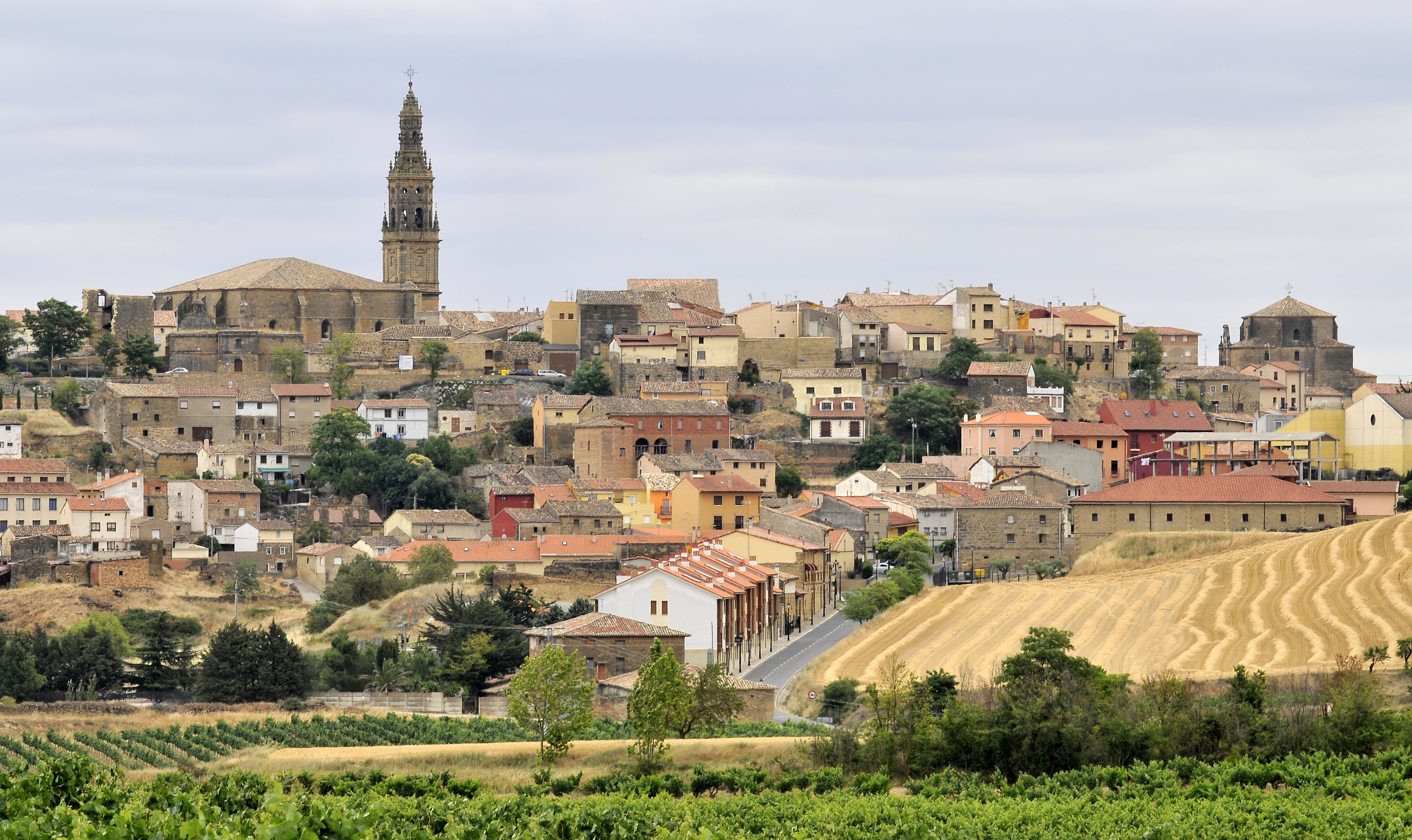
- Skyline of Briones

- Location within La Rioja, Spain Location within Spain
- Coordinates: 42°32′39″N 2°47′06″W
- Country: Spain
- Autonomous community: La Rioja
- Comarca: Haro
- Founded: c. 1st century

Government
  - Alcalde: María Carmen Ruiz Ruiz (People's Party)

Area
  - Total: 37.72 km^{2} (14.56 sq mi)

Population (2025-01-01)
  - Total: 752
  - Density: 19.9/km^{2} (51.6/sq mi)
- Demonym: brionero/ra
- Time zone: UTC+1 (CET)
  - Summer (DST): UTC+2 (CEST)
- Postal code: 26330
- Official language: Spanish
- Website: Official website

Briones is a village in the province and autonomous community of La Rioja, Spain. The municipality covers an area of 37.72 square kilometres (14.56 sq mi) and as of 2011 had a population of 873 people.

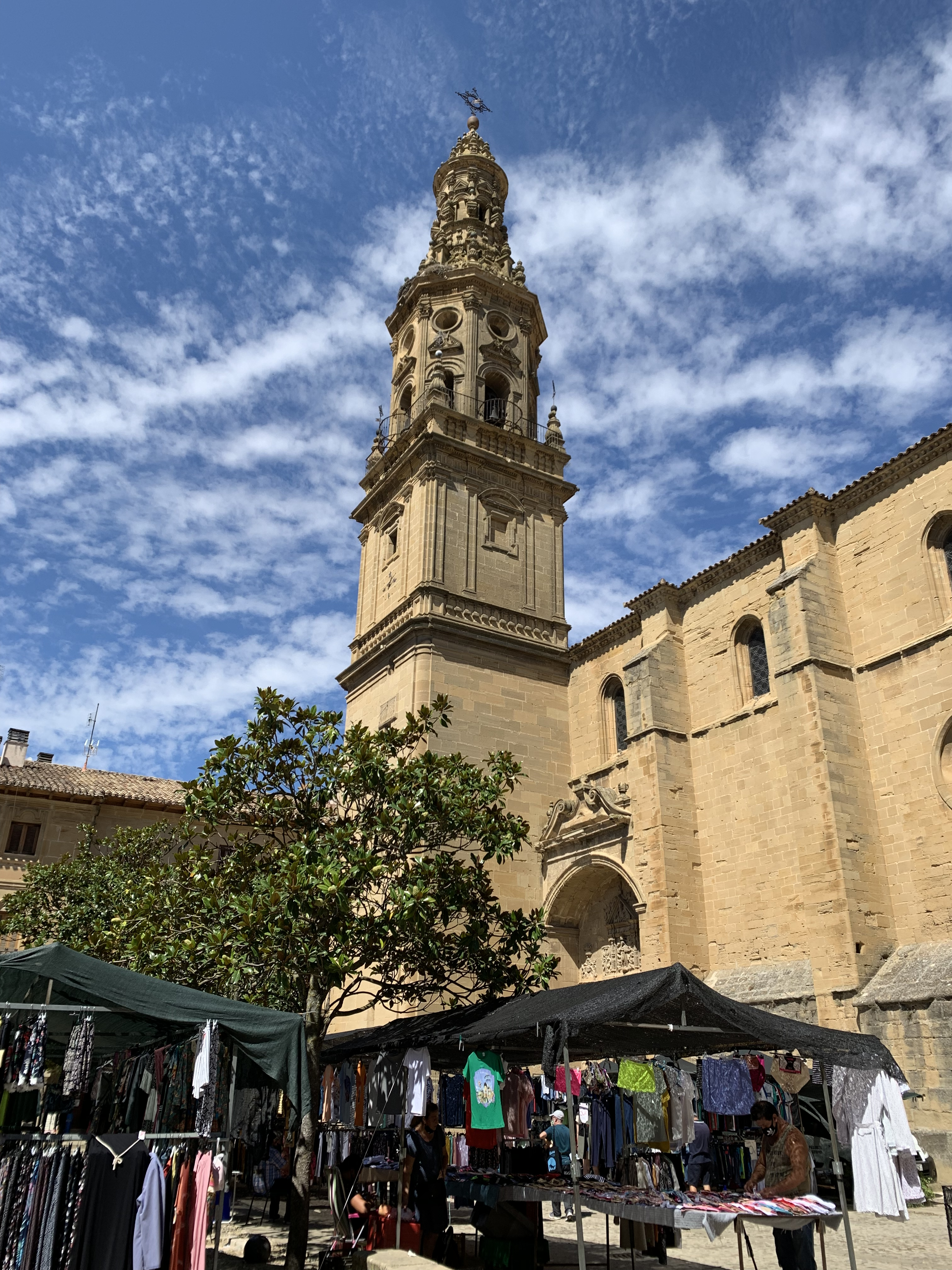
Church in Briones, Haro

== History ==
The name Briones comes from the Berones, ancient inhabitants of La Rioja, but according to a lithic site from the Bronze Age found in the path of the Santos Mártires chapel, Briones had inhabitants before the Beroners. The Albedense Chronicle (c. 883) says that Alfonso I of Asturias cut down the village of Briones and six other municipalities. Moreover, the chronicle also mentions the famous expedition led by Alphonso I, king of Asturias all the way down the Ebro river in 740. In that chronicle, these destroyed villages are mentioned: Mirandam (now Miranda de Ebro), Revedencam, Carbonariam, Abeicam (Ábalos, where the expedition crossed the Ebro river), Brunes (this might be Briones but it is uncertain), Cinissariam (now Cenicero) and Alesanco.

Briones was under Saracen control until the late 9th century, and it belonged to King Ordoño II of León since the beginnings of the 10th century. Briones also belonged to the Castilla County, which had been repopulated with Basques and was a frontier between Castilla and Navarra. After Sancho el de Peñalén was murdered 4 June 1076, Alfonso VI took over La Rioja and Briones became part of the domain of Haro. Fernando III named Don Diego López III de Haro, the monarch's nephew, first Lord of Briones. In 1240 Don Diego López rebelled against Fernando III and found shelter in Briones. The king enclosed the town and made him prisoner. Since then, Briones belonged to the crown. On 18 January 1256, Alfonso X of Castile gave Briones the regional laws from Vitoria, as a guarantee of the Castilian repopulation. In 1293 Sancho IV gave Briones royal privilege. During the Basquisation in 1536 there were thirty Basque surnames in Briones.

== Demography ==
On 1 January 2010 the population of the town was up to 867 inhabitants, 464 men and 403 women.

== Interesting places ==
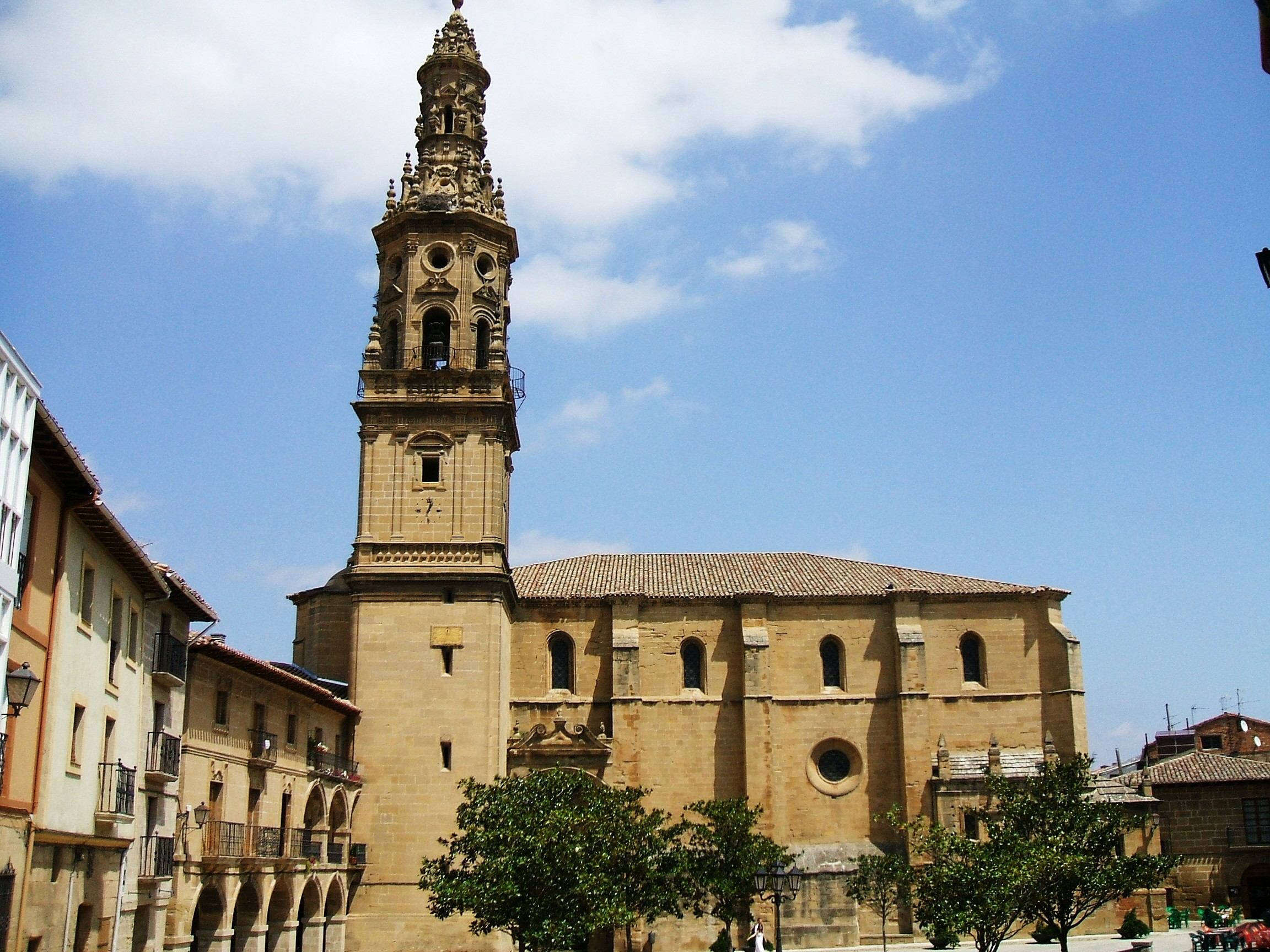
Iglesia de Nuestra Señora de la Asunción

=== Iglesia de Nuestra Señora de la Asunción ===
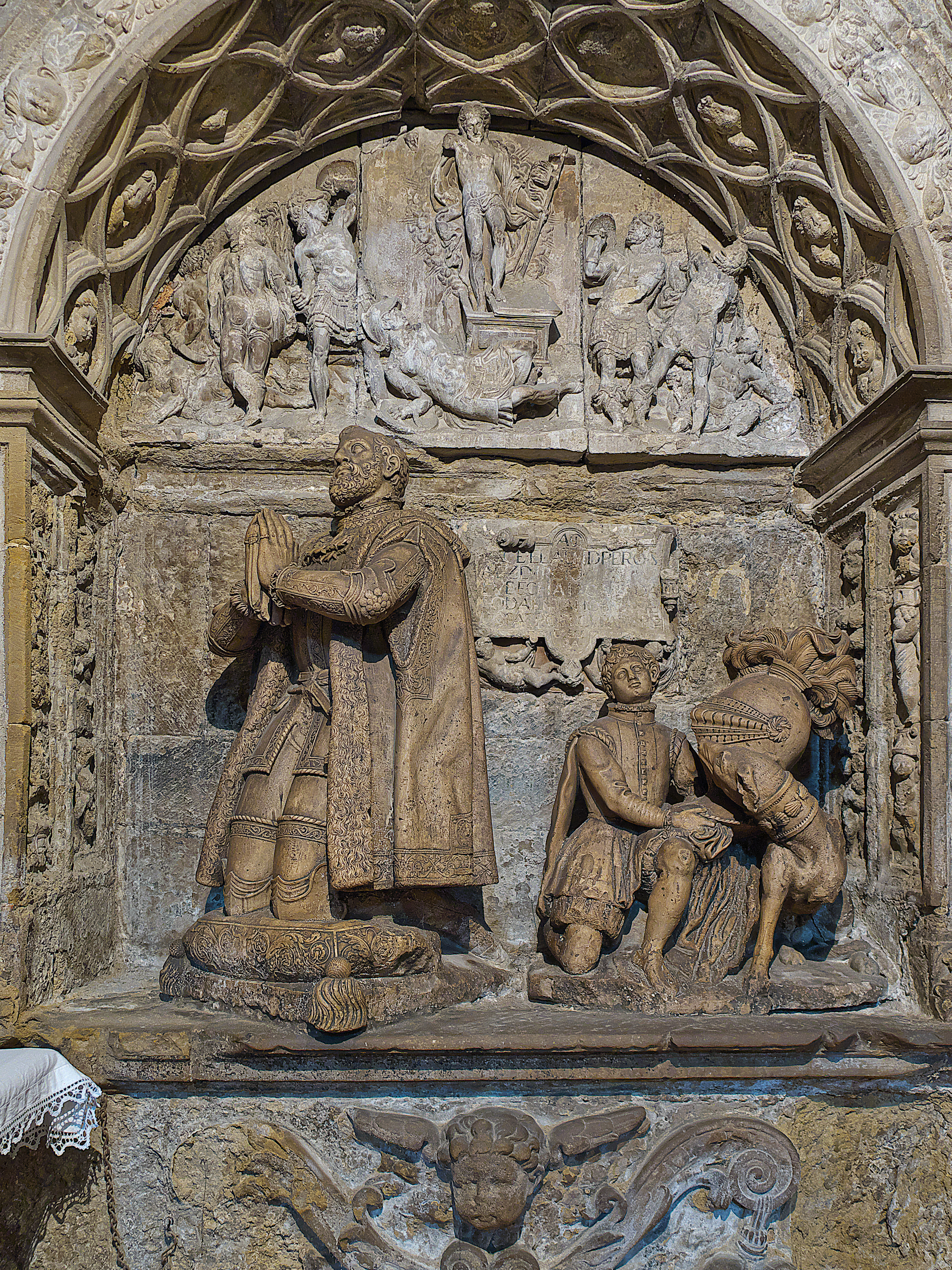
Pedro de Hircio's tomb

It was built in the 16th century using the Isabelline Gothic style and was declared Bien de Interés Cultural in the monument category on 4 September 1981.

=== Other buildings ===
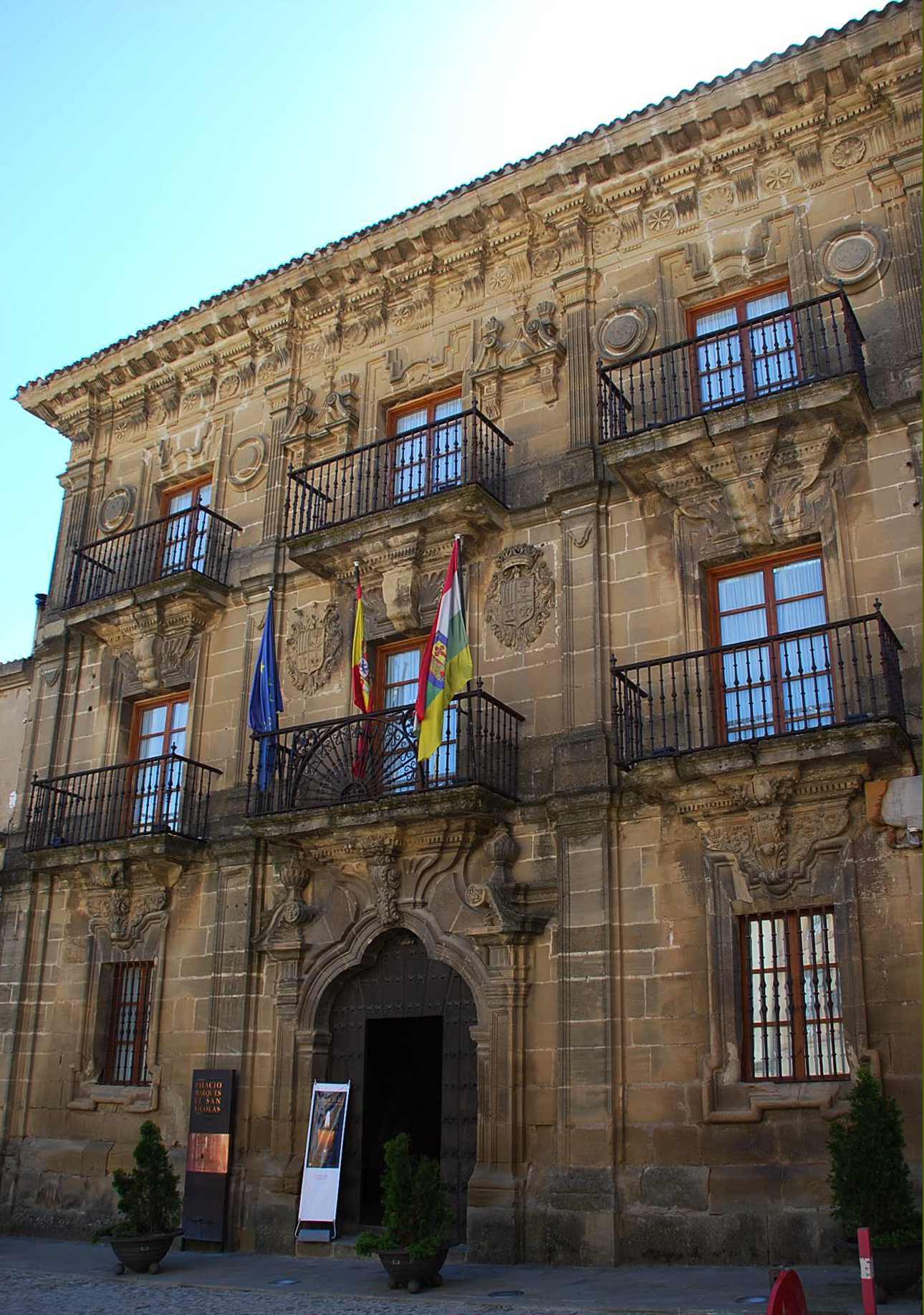
Palacio del Marqués de San Nicolás

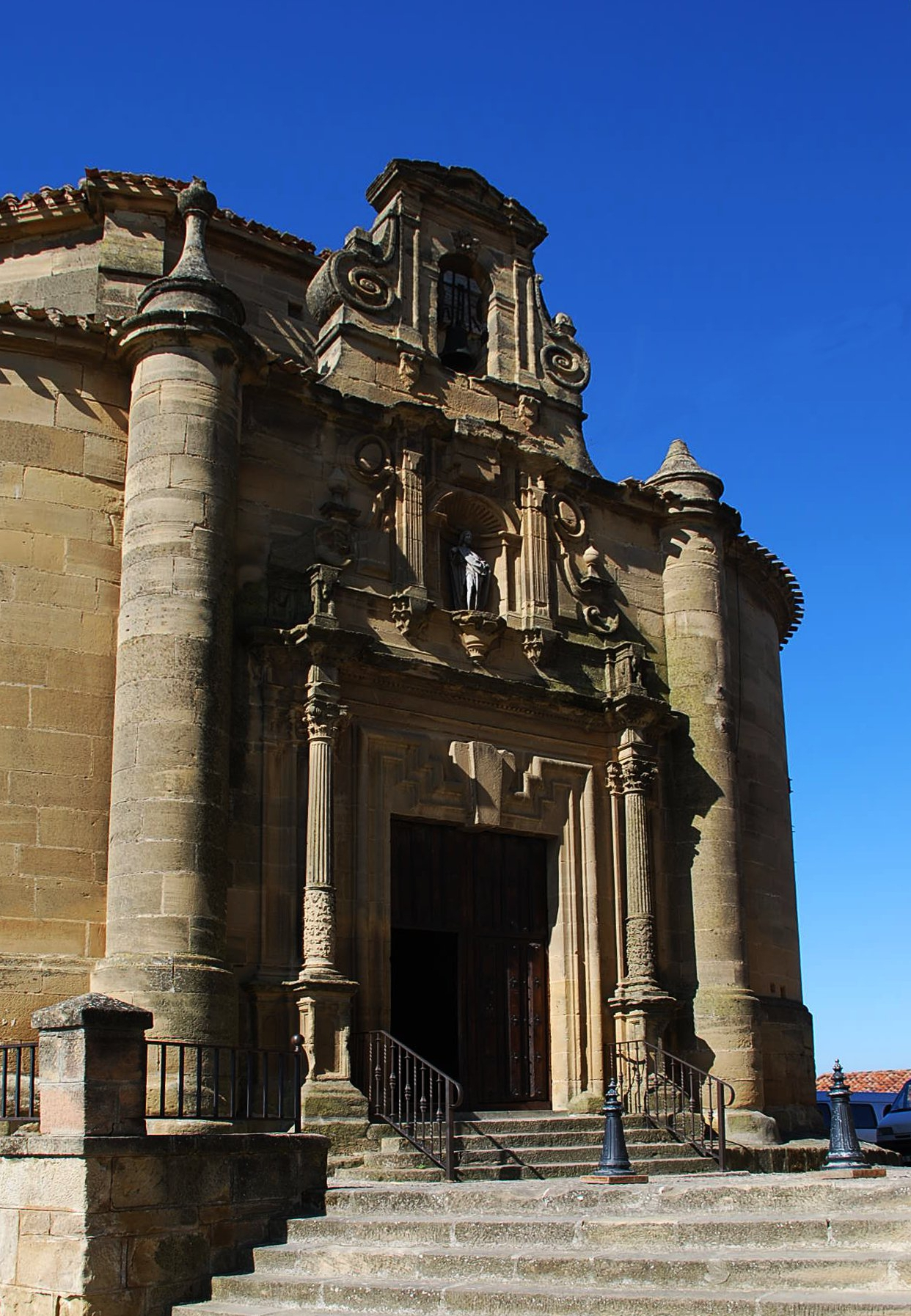
Ermita del Cristo de los Remedios

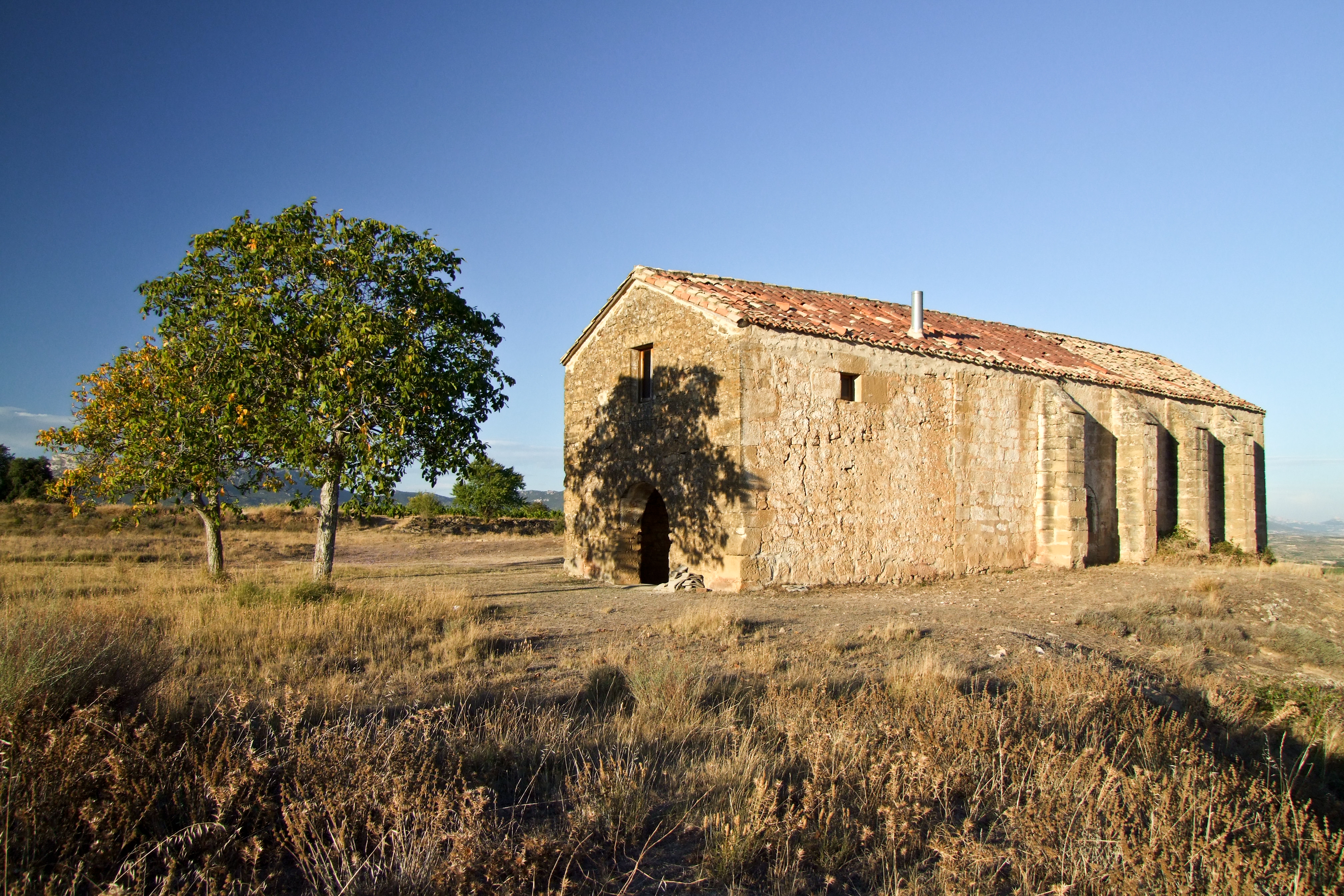
Ermita de los Santos Mártires

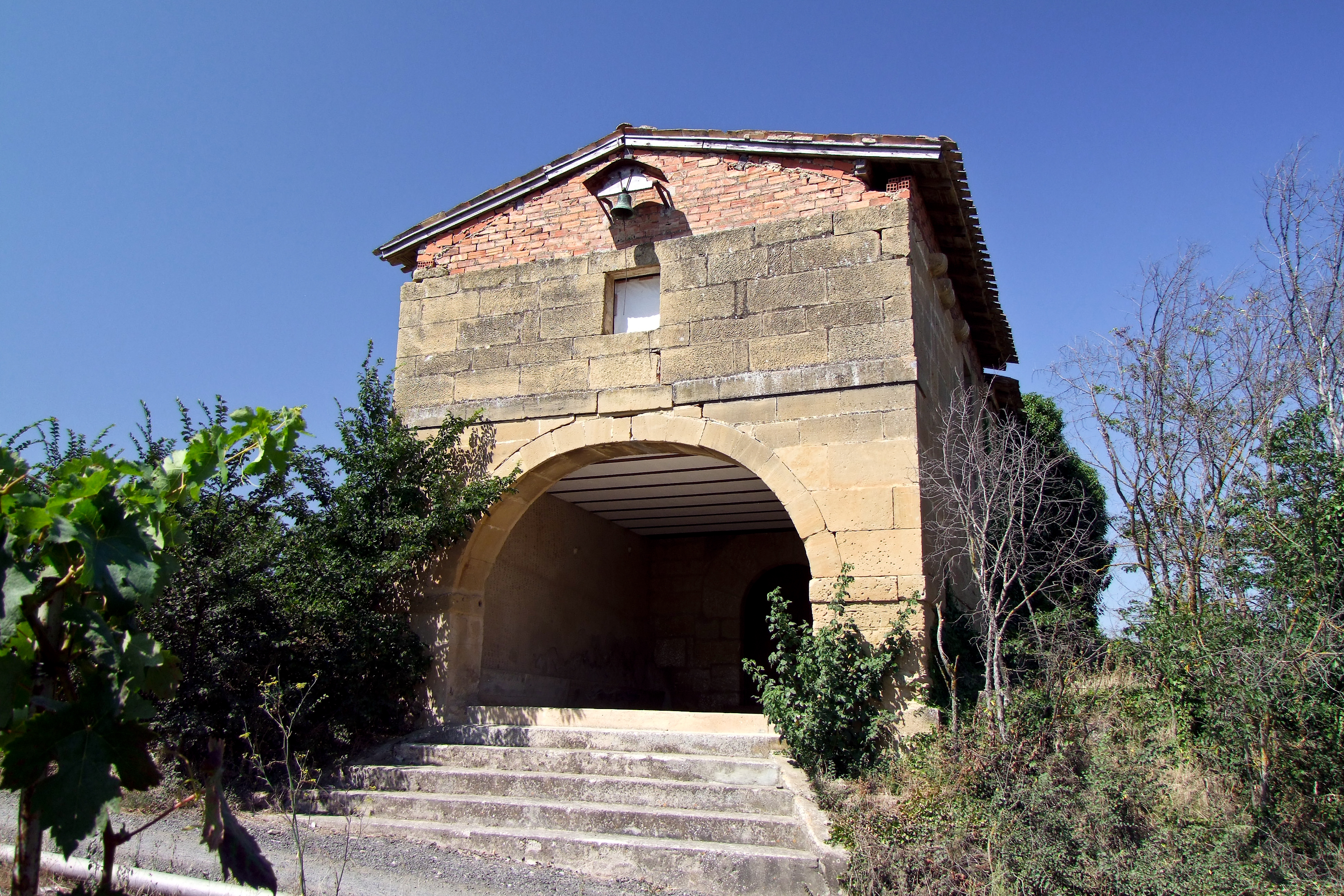
Ermita de Santa Lucía.

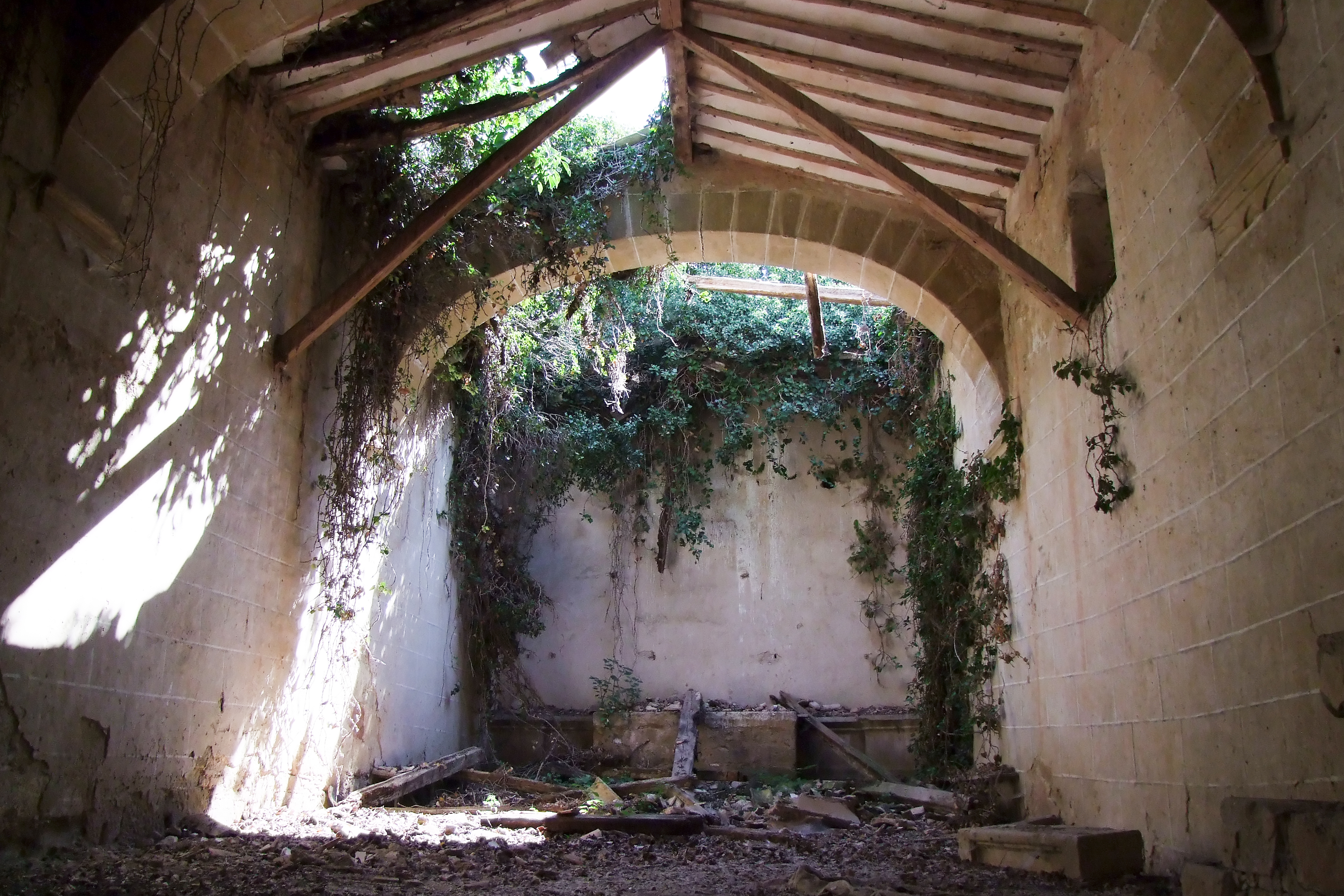
Ermita de San Andrés.

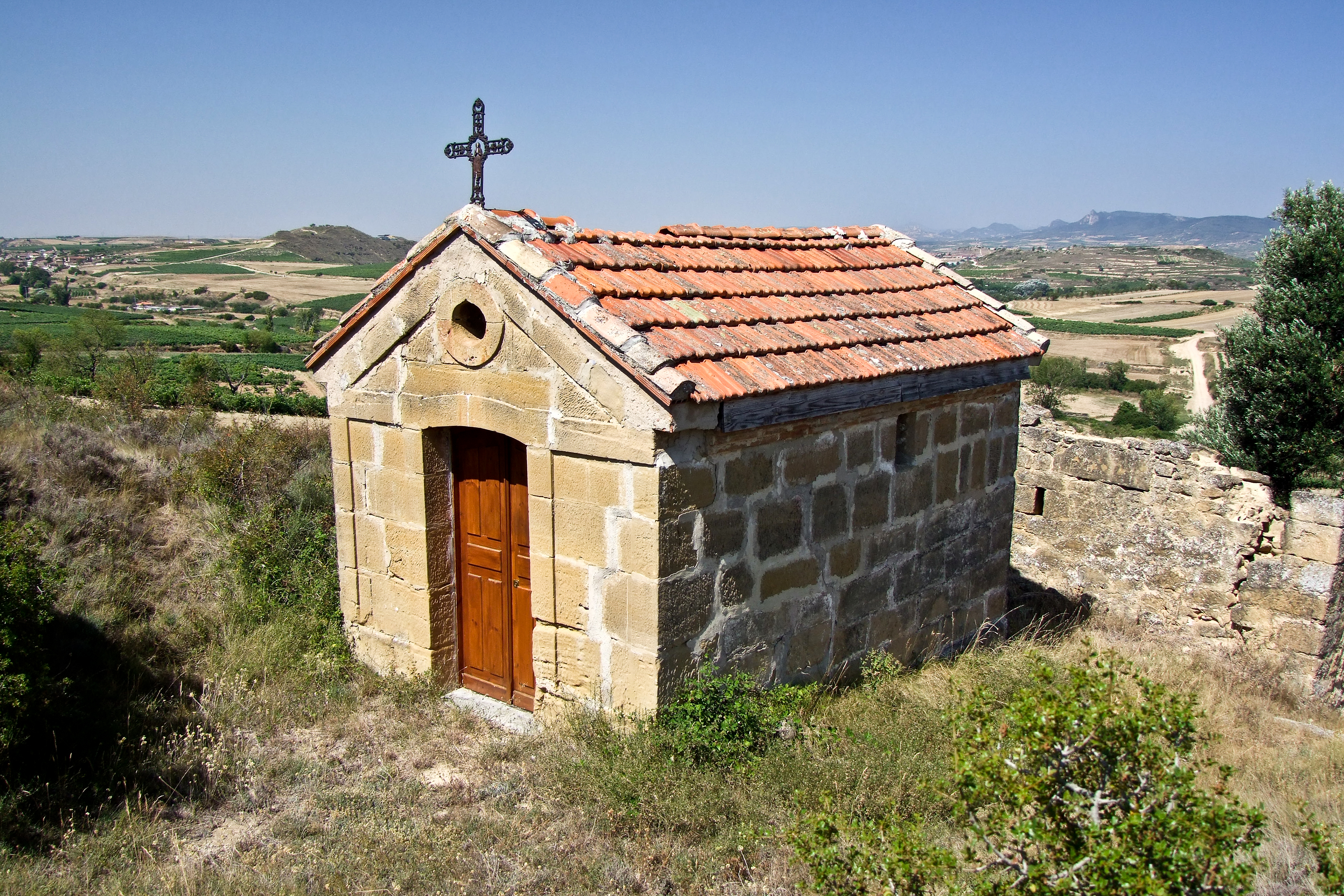
Ermita del Calvario.

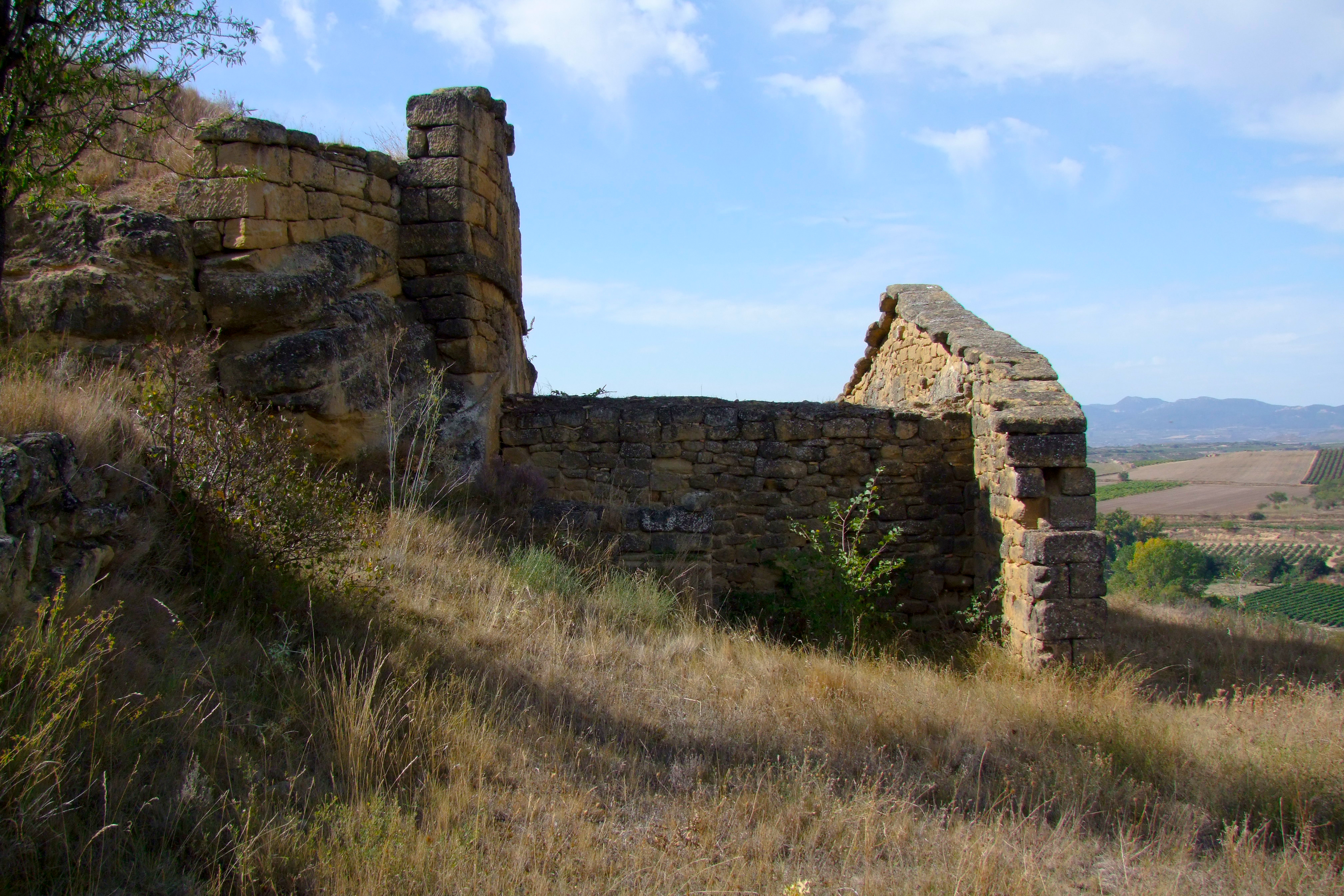
Ermita de San Bartolomé.

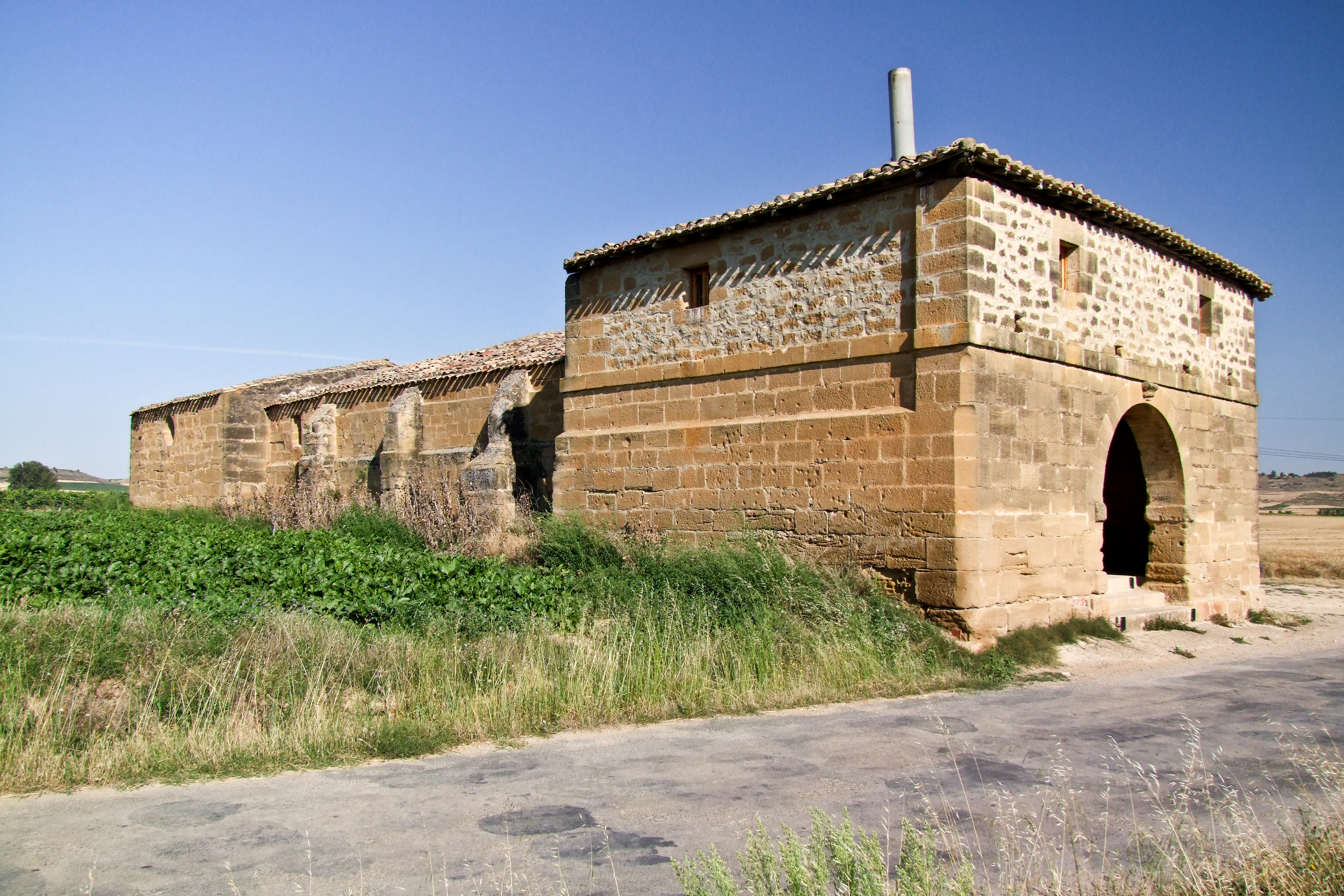
Ermita de la Concepción.

- Ermita del Cristo de los Remedios
- Ermita de los Santos Mártires
- Ermita de Santa Lucía
- Ermita de San Andrés
- Ermita de San Bartolomé
- Ermita del Calvario
- Ermita de San Bartolomé
- Ermita de la Concepción
- Palacio de Marqués de San Nicolás: From the 17th century. Now the Town Hall
- La casa de los Gadea

=== Museums ===
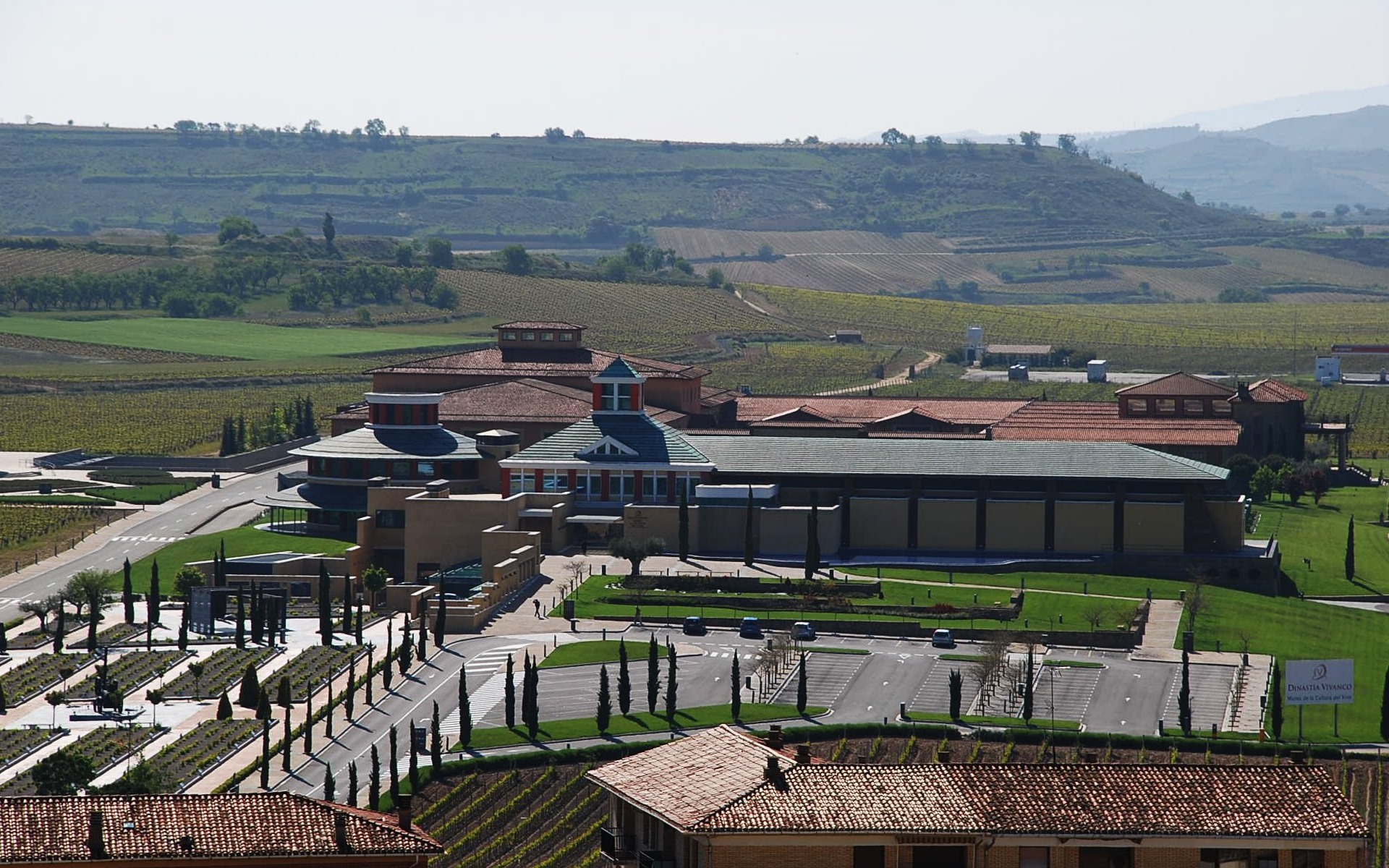
Wine Culture Museum.

- Vivanco Dinasty Wine Culture Museum
- Ethnographic Museum, aka La casa encantada

=== Historic-artistic grouping ===
Briones has been Bien de Interés Cultural in the Conjunto Histórico category since 4 July 1973.

== Patronage festivals ==
- The first Sunday after 14 September, festivity of the Vera Cruz: remembrance of the advocation of the Santo Cristo de los Remedios, patron saint of Briones.

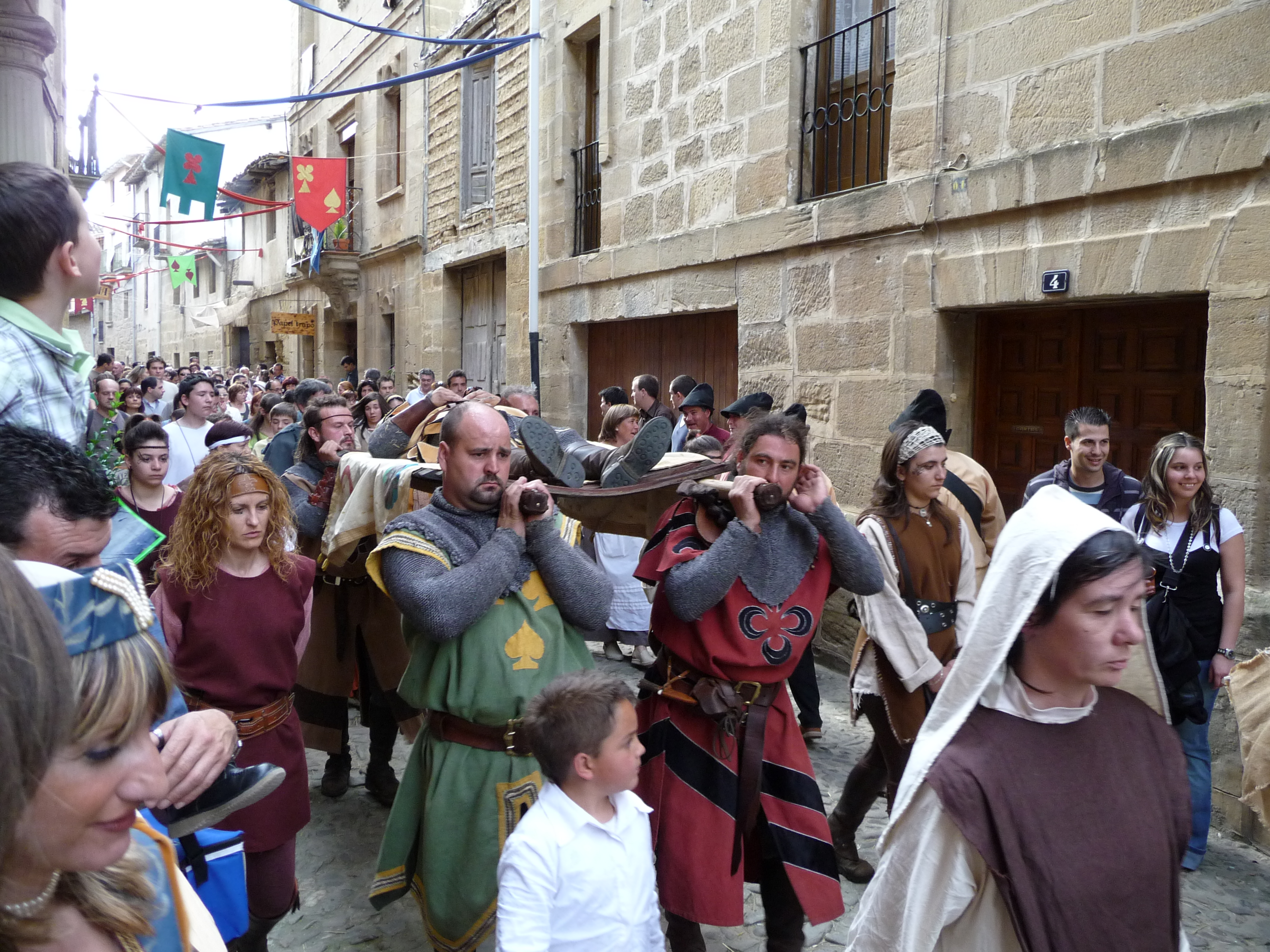
Representation of Martín Lafita's burial during the Jornadas Medievales.

- Jornadas Medievales: third weekend of June. The inhabitants reproduce the life in the village during the 14th century.

== Other interesting facts ==
In 2010 was published in TVE the TV series Gran Reserva. Part of it was filmed in Briones, but in the show it was renamed as Lasiesta.

== See also ==
- List of Bien de Interés Cultural in the Province of La Rioja
- List of municipalities in La Rioja
- La Rioja (Spain)
