= The Minions of Midas =

Spanish thriller drama television series

- Spanish: Los Favoritos de Midas
- Genre: Crime; Drama; Thriller
- Created by: Miguel Barros; Mateo Gil
- Based on: "The Minions of Midas" by Jack London
- Directed by: Mateo Gil
- Starring: Luis Tosar; Marta Belmonte; Guillermo Toledo
- Country of origin: Spain
- Original language: Spanish
- No. of seasons: 1
- No. of episodes: 6

Production
- Running time: 49–57 minutes
- Production company: Nostromo Pictures

Original release
- Network: Netflix
- Release: 13 November 2020

The Minions of Midas (Spanish: Los favoritos de Midas) is a 2020 Spanish thriller drama television limited series created by Miguel Barros and Mateo Gil and starring Luis Tosar, Marta Belmonte and Guillermo Toledo. It is loosely based on the short story of the same name by Jack London.

== Cast ==
- Luis Tosar as Víctor Genovés
- Marta Belmonte as Mónica Báez
- Guillermo Toledo as Inspector Conte
- Carlos Blanco as Luis
- Marta Milans as María José
- Goize Blanco as Natalia
- Jorge Andreu as Marcos
- Daniel Holguín as Raúl
- Bea Segura as Laura
- Adolfo Fernández as Mauro
- Juan Blanco as Daniel
- Vito Sanz as Tucho
- Elena Irureta as Teresa Jiménez
- Ana Gracia as Pilar Robles
- Miguel Ángel Solá as Sabino
- Tania Watson as Agente Udev 6
- Juanma Díez as Agente Udev 5
- Pepe Ocio as Javier

== Episodes ==
No.	Title	Original release date
1	"Dilemma" (Dilema)	November 13, 2020
2	"Random" (Azar)	November 13, 2020
3	"Guilt" (Culpa)	November 13, 2020
4	"Crack" (Grieta)	November 13, 2020
5	"Departure" (Salida)	November 13, 2020
6	"Fight" (Lucha)	November 13, 2020

== Release ==
The Minions of Midas was released on Netflix on 13 November 2020.
