= Marta Belmonte =

Spanish actress

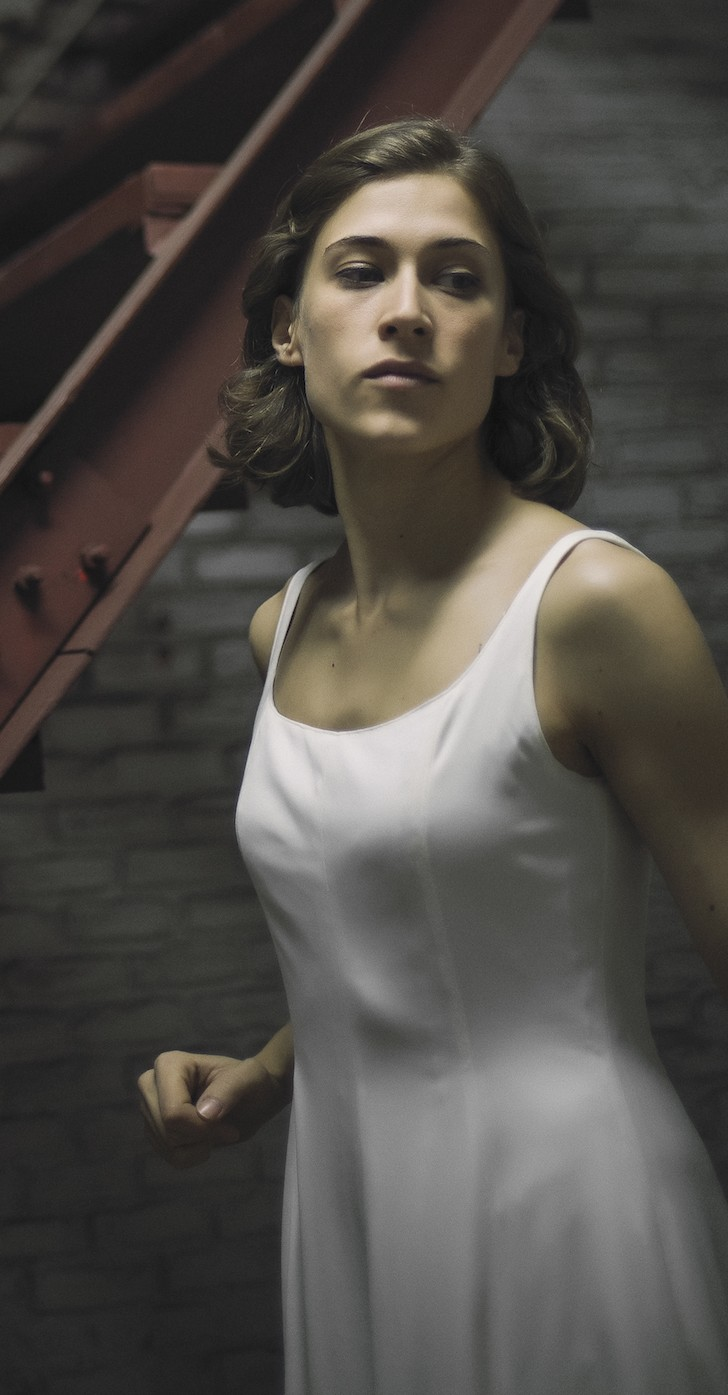
- Belmonte in 2014
- Born: Marta Belmonte Ibáñez; 27 September 1982 (age 43); Barcelona, Catalonia, Spain
- Occupation: Actress

Marta Belmonte Ibáñez (born 27 September, 1982) is a Spanish television and stage actress, also with some film work. Her television credits include performances in Servir y proteger, The Minions of Midas, and Sueños de libertad.

== Life and career ==
Born in Barcelona on 27 September 1982, Belmonte moved to Zaragoza at age 14, and then returned to her native city to train in the performing arts at the Col.legi del Teatre from 2000 to 2003. She received further training in physical theatre. She eventually moved to Madrid, where she has been based for over 18 years.

She appeared in some documentaries, such as Cineastas en acción and Cineastas contra magnates. Her work onstage include performances in plays such as Los Cenci, Juicio a Don Juan, La Celestina, and Cielos.

She appeared in series such as Hospital Central, Los misterios de Laura, Gran Reserva and Isabel. She played Rebeca Ramos in Gente que viene y bah, aka In Family I Trust.

In 2018, she joined the cast of soap opera Servir y proteger, portraying police inspector Silvia Orestes for over 200 episodes. In 2020, Belmonte portrayed journalist Mónica Baez in the Netflix miniseries The Minions of Midas.

At the end of 2023, her signing was confirmed for Sueños de libertad, a daily series on Antena 3, to play Marta de la Reina, along with Alba Brunet, Alain Hernández, Natalia Sánchez, and Dani Tatay, among others. Her character, Marta's, popular sapphic relationship with Fina (dubbed as "Mafin") earned her recognition and admiration from the public, both domestically and abroad.

== Filmography ==
=== Television ===
Year	Title	Network	Role	Notes
2003	Jet lag	TV3		1 episode
2005	Ventdelplà	TV3	Amaia	1 episode
2006	Los simuladores	Cuatro		2 episodes
2007	Hospital Central	Telecinco	María José	3 episodes
2007	Círculo rojo	Antena 3	Belén	10 episodes
2007 - 2008	Desaparecida	La 1	María	2 episodes
2009	El porvenir es largo	La 1	Natalia Echevarría	64 episodes
2009	Los misterios de Laura	La 1	Vanessa López	1 episode
2010	Valientes	Cuatro	Juana Gómez Acuña	45 episodes
2011	Ángel o demonio	Telecinco	Bárbara	1 episode
2011	Piratas	Telecinco		2 episodes
2011; 2013	Gran Reserva	La 1	Nuria Asensi	8 episodes
2012	Kubala, Moreno i Manchón	TV3		1 episode
2013	Familia	Telecinco	Marina	1 episode
2014	Isabel	La 1	Anne of Brittany	7 episodes
2015	La que se avecina	Telecinco	Bibi	1 episode
2018 - 2019	Servir y proteger	La 1	Silvia Orestes	247 episodes
2020	The Minions of Midas	Netflix	Mónica Báez	6 episodes
2021	La Fortuna	Movistar Plus+	María Esperanza	1 episode
2023	Isla brava	Vix	Samantha Cruz	7 episodes
2024	Una vida menos en Canarias	Atresplayer	Camila Salazar Turino	1 episode
2024 - presente	Sueños de libertad	Antena 3	Marta de la Reina	¿? episodes
2024	Iron Reign	Netflix	Cristina	4 episodes

=== Music videos ===
Year	Artist	Song	Ref.
2013	Melendi	"Cheque al Portamor"	
