= Gran Reserva. El origen =

2013 Spanish television series

- Genre: Period drama Soap opera
- Country of origin: Spain
- No. of seasons: 1
- No. of episodes: 82

Production
- Production companies: TVE; Bambú Producciones

Original release
- Network: La 1
- Release: 13 May – 23 August 2013

Related
- Gran Reserva

Gran Reserva. El origen is a Spanish drama television series, working as a prequel to Gran Reserva. Produced by Televisión Española in collaboration with Bambú Producciones, it aired from May 2013 to August 2013. It focuses on the events happening four decades before the original series.

== Premise ==
The plot is set in 1967 in the fictional winemaking village of Lasiesta (La Rioja).

The series deals with intrigues influencing the events of the Gran Reserva series more than forty years later, including the relations between the Cortázar and the Reverte families and the struggle between the Cortázar family and a third family, the Miranda, the dominant winemaking power in the region at the time, led by the marriage formed by Santiago Miranda (Manuel Blas) and Elvira Prieto (Silvia Marsó).

== Cast ==
- Marta Torné as Elena Cortázar.
- Jesús Olmedo as Luis Miranda.
- Verónica Sánchez as Sofía Reverte.
- Alberto San Juan as Jesús Reverte.
- Álex Angulo as Eduardo Matute.
- Sergio Mur as Roberto Vega.
- Pastora Vega as Pilar Jiménez.
- Paula Prendes as Carolina Jiménez.
- Cesáreo Estébanez as Teodoro Ortega.
- José Ángel Egido as Don Bernardo Cela, the Mayor.
- Blanca Jara as Asunción Cela.
- Álex Barahona as Andrés Guillén.
- Yolanda Ulloa as Inés Mendoza.
- Carlota Olcina as Manuela Matute.
- Silvia Marsó as Elvira Prieto.
- Manuel Blas as Santiago Miranda.
- Pablo Castañón as Adolfo Reverte.
- Carlos Álvarez-Nóvoa as Ricardo Reverte.
- Petra Martínez as Renata Ramos.
- José Manuel Cervino as Alejandro Cortázar.
- Víctor Clavijo as Vicente Cortázar.
- Mamen Camacho as Rosalía.
- Pau Roca as Rafael Cortázar.
- Javier Pereira as Gabriel Cortázar.
- Joaquín Climent as Dimas, Lasiesta's baker.
- Marta Calvó as Clotilde Ontiveros.

== Production and release ==
Gran Reserva. El origen is a prequel series to Gran Reserva. Produced by Televisión Española (TVE) in collaboration with Bambú Producciones, filming started on 5 Abril 2013. The serial premiered in the sobremesa time slot on 13 May 2013. Given the unconvincing viewership figures, TVE decided to cut the number of episodes from the initially intended 130 to 82, and to program back to back episodes to bring the series to its end sooner. The broadcasting run ended on 23 August 2013.

Series	Episodes	Originally released		
Series	Episodes	First released	Last released	Network
1	82	13 May 2013	23 August 2013	tve
