= Hispania, la leyenda =

Spanish adventure drama television series

- Genre: Adventure; Historical fiction; Drama
- Created by: Ramón Campos
- Starring: Roberto Enríquez; Lluís Homar; Ana de Armas; Juan José Ballesta; Jesús Olmedo; Manuela Vellés; Nathalie Poza
- Country of origin: Spain
- Original language: Spanish
- No. of seasons: 3
- No. of episodes: 20

Production
- Production company: Bambú Producciones

Original release
- Network: Antena 3
- Release: 25 October 2010 – 25 June 2012

Related
- Imperium

Hispania, la leyenda (transl. 'Hispania, the legend') is a Spanish adventure drama television series starring Roberto Enríquez, Lluís Homar, Ana de Armas, Juan José Ballesta, Jesús Olmedo, Manuela Vellés and Nathalie Poza, among others. Set in the 2nd century BC in the Iberian Peninsula, it consists of a retelling of the myth around Lusitanian leader Viriathus and his resistance against Roman conquest efforts. Produced by Bambú Producciones, it aired on Antena 3 from 2010 to 2012.

== Premise ==
The plot consists of the retelling of the Viriatus' resistance against the Romans during the conquest of the Iberian Peninsula in the 2nd century BC. The struggle of Viriatus (Roberto Enríquez), a humble and courageous shepherd, pits him against the Roman praetor Servius Sulpicius Galba (Lluís Homar).

== Cast ==
- Roberto Enríquez as Viriato (Viriathus).
- Manuela Vellés as Helena.
- Ana de Armas as Nerea.
- Juan José Ballesta as Paulo.
- Alfonso Bassave as Darío.
- Hovik Keuchkerian as Sandro.
- Pablo Derqui as Héctor.
- Antonio Gil as Teodoro.
- Luz Valdenebro as Bárbara.
- Lluís Homar as Galba.
- Jesús Olmedo as Marco.
- Ángela Cremonte as Sabina.
- Nathalie Poza as Claudia.
- Javier Rey as Alejo de Urso.

Introduced in season 2

- Iván Sánchez as Fabio.
- Juana Acosta as Aldara.
- Thais Blume as Gaia.
- Ana Rujas as Stena.
- Irene Arcos as Navia.

== Production and release ==
The series was created by Ramón Campos and produced by Bambú Producciones. Filming started in the northern hemisphere Summer of 2010 in La Vera, Extremadura. The 9-episode first season premiered on 25 October 2010 in prime time on Antena 3, running until 11 January 2011. The first season earned "great" viewership figures, averaging a 22.8% share. The second season aired from 10 May to 28 June 2011, whereas the third and last season (featuring 3 episodes) aired from 11 June to 25 June 2012. Along its broadcasting run, the series drew a steadily waning interest in terms of viewers, closing the series with a season finale attracting roughly 2 million viewers and a 12% share.

The series sparked a spin-off, Imperium, aired in 2012.

Series	Episodes	Originally released		Average viewership	Share (%)	Ref.
Series	Episodes	First released	Last released	Average viewership	Share (%)	Ref.
1	9	25 October 2010	11 January 11	4,768,000	22.8	
2	8	10 May 2011	28 June 2011	2,795,000	15.0	
3	3	11 June 2012	25 June 2012	2,285,000	13.0	

== Historical licenses ==
Several gross departures from historical plausibility in the fiction have been described, including the "unfortunate" onomastics chosen for the rebels, featuring Roman, Greek or even Persian names, or the notion of the inhabitants of the Iberian Peninsula sharing a sort of common "patriotic consciousness" describing themselves collectively as "Hispanos" [sic], when rather tribal societies with different languages existed at the time. Likewise, the series moves the association of the myth of Viriathus from the Lusitanian space to a "more fluid" Iberian space. Hence, in the light of a number of historical inacuraccies and the problematic nature of the recreated imaginaries, Elena Cueto Asín and David R. George argue that "Hispania, la leyenda crosses the boundaries of what is dramatically permissible in historical fiction".

According to Fernando Gil González, the series, based on "the old 'Schultenian' precepts of nationalist and romantic nature", "is an outdated soap opera based on out-of-context anachronistic events and falsified data about the figure of Viriato".

== Accolades ==
Year	Award	Category	Nominee(s)	Result	Ref.
2011	61st Fotogramas de Plata	Best TV Actor	Lluís Homar	Nominated	
2012	14th Iris Awards	Best Actor	Lluís Homar	Won	
2013	22nd Actors and Actresses Union Awards	Best Television Actor in a Leading Role	Roberto Enríquez	Won	
