= Ángela Cremonte =

Spanish-Argentine actress

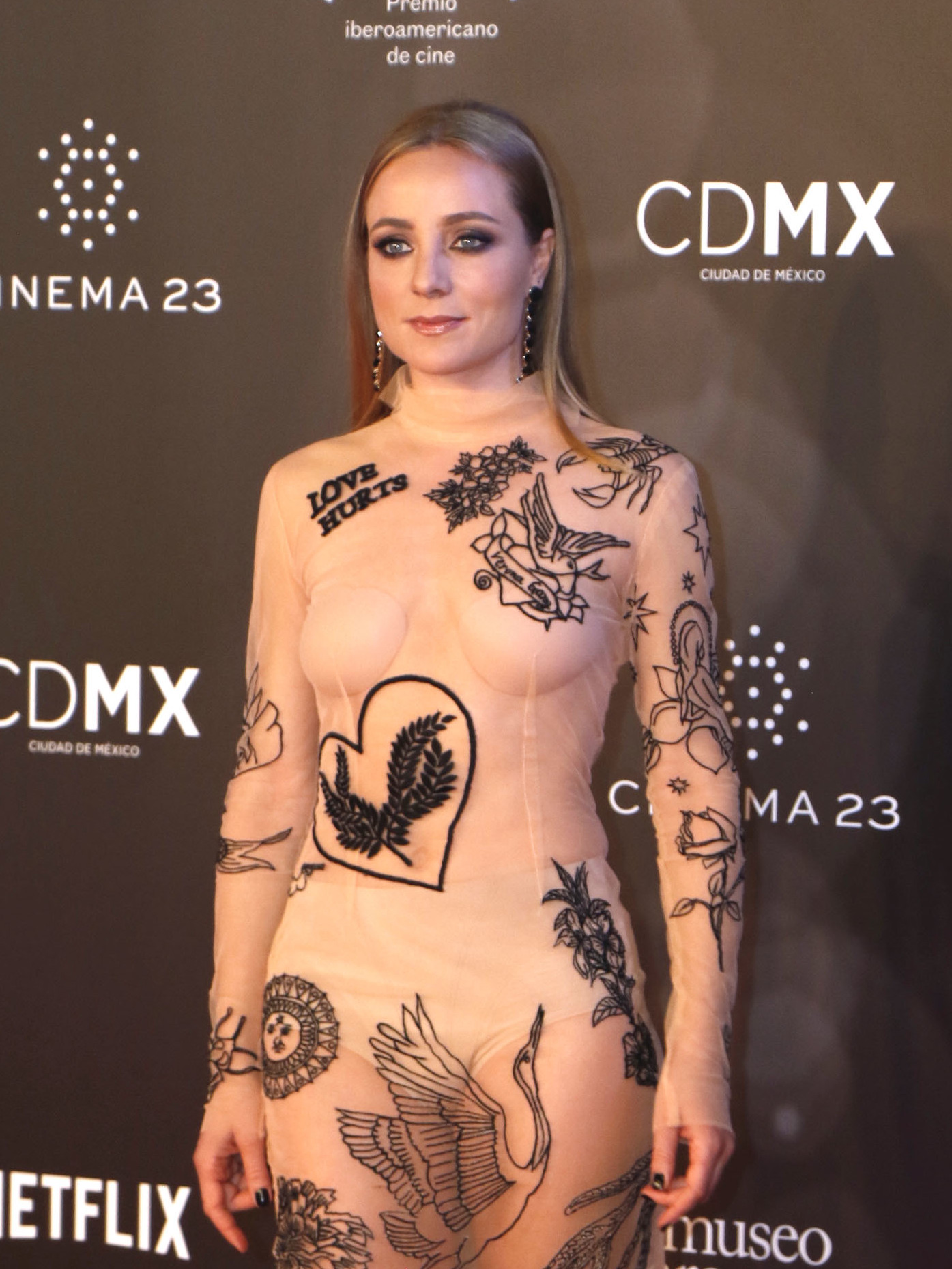
- At the 4th Fénix Awards in 2017
- Born: 1982 or 1985; Madrid, Spain
- Occupation: Actress
- Known for: Cable Girls

Ángela Cremonte is a Spanish-Argentine actress. She is best known for her performance playing Elisa in Cable Girls.

== Biography ==
Born on 3 April 1985 in Madrid, (or 1982) she is the daughter of Argentinian parents. Cremonte had her debut in a feature film at age 15, performing a minor role in No Pain, No Gain. She earned a licentiate degree in Humanities from the Charles III University of Madrid (UC3M), whereas she received training as a stage actress at La Replika school. With an early career mostly focused on theatre plays, some of her most relevant stage credits include her performances as Ismene in Antigone and Ophelia in Hamlet. In 2010, she landed three breakthrough television roles (in Los hombres de Paco, Hispania, la leyenda and Gran Reserva), which brought her public recognition. In 2021, she had her debut as a writer, with the novel Todos mienten a la noche (Editorial Planeta).

== Filmography ==
Television

Year	Title	Role	Notes	Ref
2010	Los hombres de Paco	Amaia	Introduced in Season 9	
2010–11	Gran Reserva	Paloma Olmedo		
2010–12	Hispania, la leyenda	Sabina		
2012	Imperium	Sabina	Reprise of her role in Hispania	
2013–14	Amar es para siempre	Valeria Prado	Main. Introduced in Season 2	
2015–16	Carlos, rey emperador	Mary Tudor		
2017–20	Las chicas del cable (Cable Girls)	Elisa Cifuentes	Main	
2020	Mentiras (Lies and Deceit)	Laura Munar	Lead role	
2022	Feria: la luz más oscura (Feria: The Darkest Light)	Blanca		

Film

Year	Title	Role	Notes	Ref
2001	Más pena que gloria (No Pain, No Gain)	Alexia		
2006	Vete de mí (Go Away from Me)	Irene		
2010	Todas las canciones hablan de mí (Every Song Is About Me)	Irene		
2011	La voz dormida (The Sleeping Voice)	Elvira		
2022	Venus	Rocío		
