= Imperium (TV series) =

- Genre: Historical drama
- Directed by: Carlos Sedes; Jorge Torregrossa
- Starring: Lluís Homar; José Sancho; Nathalie Poza
- Country of origin: Spain
- Original language: Spanish
- No. of seasons: 1
- No. of episodes: 6

Production
- Running time: 60 minutes
- Production company: Bambú Producciones

Original release
- Network: Antena 3
- Release: 5 September – 11 October 2012

Related
- Hispania, la leyenda

Imperium is a Spanish historical fiction television series set in Rome in the 2nd century BC. It is a spin-off of Hispania, la leyenda.

== Cast ==
- Lluís Homar - Servius Sulpicius Galba
- José Sancho - Quintus Servilius Caepio
- Nathalie Poza - Claudia Fabia Mara
- Jesús Olmedo - Marco
- Aura Garrido - Cora
- Antonio Mourelos - Octavio
- Belén Fabra - Cordelia
- Fernando Andina - Druso
