= Gran Reserva (TV series) =

Spanish drama television series

- Genre: Melodrama; Thriller
- Created by: Ramón Campos; Gema R. Neira
- Starring: Emilio Gutiérrez Caba; Ángela Molina; Paula Echevarría; Tristán Ulloa
- Country of origin: Spain
- Original language: Spanish
- No. of seasons: 3 (Note: Plus 3 special episodes added to the third season.)
- No. of episodes: 42

Production
- Production companies: RTVE; Bambú Producciones

Original release
- Network: La 1
- Release: 15 April 2010 – 29 April 2013

Related
- Gran Reserva. El origen (2013); Reserva de familia Caminos de Guanajuato

Gran Reserva is a Spanish drama television series, starring Emilio Gutiérrez Caba, Ángela Molina, Tristán Ulloa and Paula Echevarría, among others. Created by Ramón Campos and Gema R. Neira and produced by Bambú Producciones for TVE, the 42 episodes of the series aired on La 1 from 2010 to 2013. Charged with melodrama and thriller, the plot follows the conflict and intrigues between two winemaking families, the Cortázar and the Reverte, in the region of La Rioja.

== Premise ==
Heralded by Don Vicente Cortázar (Emilio Gutiérrez Caba), the patriarch, the Cortázar family embodies an aggressive and ruthless approach towards the winemaking business. Don Vicente is the father of Miguel (Tristán Ulloa), Raúl (Aitor Luna), Pablo (Francesc Garrido) and Emma (Ana Risueño), and represents the archetype of "evil character", while Raúl Cortázar and Gustavo Arístides also display "Machiavellian" masculine behaviours.

Conversely, the Reverte family, prone to the romanticisation of the business, is led by Doña Sofía Reverte (Ángela Molina), the mother of Daniel (Ricard Sales) and Lucía (Paula Echevarría), a journalist based on New York who returns to the cellars to help in the family business upon the sudden death of her father.

The attempted assassination of the first born son of the Cortázar, Miguel, is the trigger of the ensuing intrigues and feuds taking place in the series. Married to Paula (Belén Fabra), Miguel survives the attempt on his life, but loses his memory, experiencing a dramatic change in his personality.

Set in the countryside of La Rioja, the series takes place in a fictionalised version of the village of Briones rendered as "La Siesta" or "Lasiesta".

== Cast ==
- Emilio Gutiérrez Caba as Don Vicente Cortázar, the patriach of the Cortázar family, a "tyrannic" man.
- Ángela Molina as Doña Sofía Reverte, the matriarch of the Reverte family.
- Paula Echevarría as Lucía Reverte.
- Tristán Ulloa as Miguel Cortázar.
- Aitor Luna as Raúl Cortázar.
- Francesc Garrido as Pablo Cortázar.
- Ana Risueño as Emma Cortázar.
- Gloria Muñoz as Rosalía Ortiz.
- Belén Fabra as Paula Gilmado.
- Alejandra Lorente as Sara Gracián.
- Armando del Río as Gustavo Arístides.
- Ledicia Sola as Mónica Robledano.
- Ángela Cremonte as Paloma Olmedo.
- Lucía Gil as Claudia Cortázar.
- Ricard Sales as Daniel Reverte.
- Carlos Álvarez-Novoa as Jesús Reverte.
- Luisa Martín as Agente Ortega.

Introduced in season 2

- Thaïs Blume as Lorena, a waitress attracted to Daniel Reverte.
- Álvaro de Luna as Asensi, the chairman of the Council.
- Marta Belmonte as Nuria, the daughter of the chairman of the Regulatory Council.
- Yon González as Manuel "Manu" Hernández, the secretary of the Cortázar's cellars.

Introduced in season 3

- Manuel Galiana as Adolfo Reverte, Jesús Reverte's younger brother.
- Unax Ugalde as Carlos, Rosalía's son.
- Mariona Tena as Mar Azpeitia, new oenologist at Bodegas Cortázar;
- Mariam Hernández as Ana, Lorena's sister.
- Úrsula Corberó as Julia, a lawyer.

Introduced in El pago de los Cortázar special episodes

- Fernando Andina as Javier.
- Marina San José as Ainhoa.
- Jorge Bosch as Navarro.

== Production and release ==
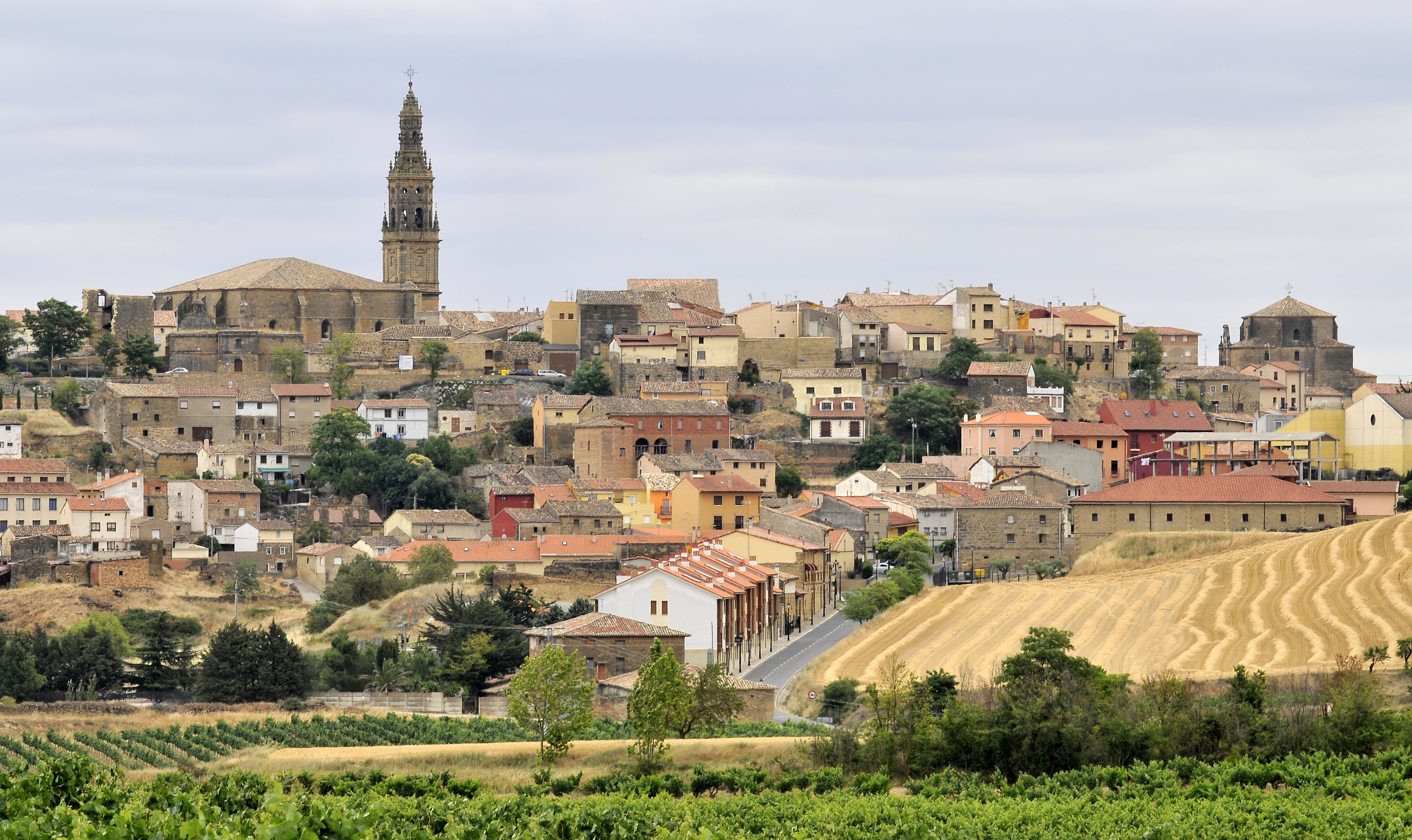
The fiction takes place in "Lasiesta", the real-life village of Briones.

Created by Ramón Campos and Gema R. Neira and produced between La Rioja and Madrid, the first season of the series was shot between August 2009 and March 2010. The series premiered on 15 April 2010.

Shot in locations of La Rioja region such as Briones, the Valpiedra estate, Cenicero, Fuenmayor, Logroño, Haro and Alfaro, as well as some scenes in El Espinar (province of Segovia), and Chinchón, Aranjuez and Moralzarzal (Community of Madrid), the 13-episode second season began airing on 24 March 2011.

The third season premiered on 7 January 2013.

Instead of filming a fullfledged fourth season, TVE decided on the run to add 3 special episodes to the third season to round off the series. These were collectively known as "El pago de los Cortázar". Aired in April 2013, the special episodes were followed by a prequel series titled Gran Reserva. El origen.

The series was remade abroad in Chile (Reserva de familia; 2012) and Mexico (Caminos de Guanajuato; 2015).

Series	Episodes	Originally released	
Series	Episodes	First released	Last released
1	13	15 April 2010	8 July 2010
2	13	24 March 2011	23 June 2011
3	13	7 January 2013	8 April 2013
S	3	15 April 2013	29 April 2013
