= Federico Jusid =

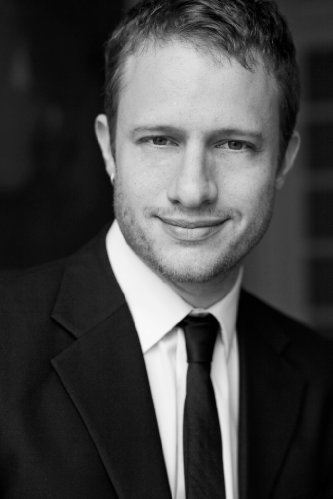

Background information
- Born: Juan Federico Jusid; Buenos Aires, Argentina
- Genres: Film score, contemporary classical, post-romanticism
- Occupations: Composer, conductor, pianist
- Instruments: Piano
- Website: federicojusid.com

Federico Jusid is an Argentine composer who resides and works between Madrid and Los Angeles. He has written the scores for more than 60 feature films and over 70 television series.

His work includes the score for the Academy Award-winner for Best Foreign Film The Secret in Their Eyes (2009, Dir. by Juan José Campanella), for which he received the nomination for the Spanish Academy Goya Award for Best Original Score.
He has recently worked with Alberto Iglesias writing additional compositions for the original score of Ridley Scott's Exodus: Gods and Kings, and he has also composed the OST for Kidnap (Luis Prieto) with Halle Berry, and Happy 140 (Gracia Querejeta). Other notable scores include The Life Unexpected (Jorge Torregrossa), Everybody Has a Plan (Anna Piterbarg), The Escape (Eduardo Mignogna), The Hidden Face (Andrés Baiz), I Want to Be a Soldier (Christian Molina), and more recently Magallanes (Salvador del Solar), Getulio (Joao Jardim), The Ignorance of Blood (Manuel Gómez Pereira), Betibu (Miguel Cohan) or Francis, Father Jorge (Beda Docampo Feijóo).
On television, his most recognised work is the soundtrack for the Spanish historical drama Isabel, with whom he won several awards, such as International Film Music Critics Association (IFMCA) Award and Reel Music Award. In 2015 he made the score for the TV series Under Suspicion and The Refugees (co-production with BBC International) and just released the historic drama Charles, King Emperor, sequel of Isabel.
He has also composed works for concert hall premiered throughout Europe and America by recognized soloist and chamber ensembles. As a pianist and composer, he has performed and toured prestigious theaters in Europe, Asia and America. He recorded for labels BMG, IRCO, Magenta Discos and Melopea.

== Early life and education ==
Federico Jusid was born in Buenos Aires, the son of well known Argentine film director Juan José Jusid and actress Luisina Brando. Jusid began studying piano and composition at age seven. Since then, he has been active as composer for the concert hall and piano soloist, performing as a soloist in numerous tours in some of the most prestigious theaters in America, Asia and Europe.

Jusid holds a Master of Music degree from The Manhattan School of Music, New York; a New England CSS, Boston; and Diplôme de Exécution Musicale with an Antorchas Foundation scholarship held at Brussels, apart from his bachelor's degree from the Buenos Aires Conservatory.

Jusid grew up among cutting rooms and film sets and soon his passion for music and film melted into a single focus that began with his first film scoring commission in 1994.

== Career ==
Jusid's works include Kidnap (Luis Prieto), with Halle Berry, Happy 140 (Gracia Querejeta), Magallanes (Salvador del Solar), Francis, Father Jorge (Beda Docampo Feijóo) based on the life of Pope Francis I, and additional compositions for the score composed by Alberto Iglesias for Ridley Scott's Exodus: Gods and Kings.

Other notable film credits include the feature films Everybody Has a Plan (starring Viggo Mortensen), The Unexpected Life (Jorge Torregrossa), Getúlio (Joao Jardim), Betibú (Miguel Cohan), The Ignorance of the Blood (Manuel Gómez Pereira), Say I Do (Columbia Pictures – Juan Calvo); The Getaway (Eduardo Mignona), The Minder (Rodrigo Moreno), Fermat's Room (Luis Piedrahíta & Rodrigo Sopeña), The Hidden Face (Twentieth Century Fox – Andrés Baiz), I Want to Be a Soldier (Warner – Dir. Christian Molina), Che, A New Man (Documentary Film, Dir. Tristán Bauer), Hold Up! (Dir. Eduard Cortés), and internationally acclaimed The Secret in Their Eyes (Dir. Juan José Campanella), Oscar winner for Best Foreign Film, and nominated for the XXIV Goya Award for Best Original Score.

His scores for television series include but are not limited to Isabel, My Queen, Charles, King Emperor, Under Suspicion, The Refugees (co-production with BBC International), Gran Reserva, La Señora, 14 de abril. La República, Los Simuladores, Hermanos y Detectives and The Mysteries of Laura.

Other distinctions for his work on cinema and television include IFMCA International Film Music Critics Association 2012 and 2013 for the Score of Isabel, My Queen which also won the Reel Music Award 2013 for Best TV Series Score; Best Original Score at the Havana Film Festival 2010, Best Original Score at the Clarin Awards 2010 in Buenos Aires, First prize Silver Condor Award from the Argentine Film Critics Association 2010, all for the film The Secret in Their Eyes; Best Original Score at the 12th Latin-American Film Festival of Trieste (Italy) 2006 for the Film Olga, Victoria Olga; First prize "Linterna" Audience award for the original soundtrack of the film Rodrigo, la película Programme El Acomodador, 2001; First Prize Pentagrama de Oro 2001, for the original soundtrack for the film The Getaway at the Mar del Plata International Film Festival; First prize Silver Condor Award for Best Film Score of the year for Bajo Bandera from the Argentine Film Critics Association 1998.

== Concerts and performances ==
Jusid shares his film-scoring activity with another passion, composing for the concert hall and performing as concerto pianist. His compositions include the piece Tango Rhapsody, for two pianos and symphonic orchestra, commissioned by the Martha Argerich Project for the International Music Festival of Lugano; Enigmas, a theatrical piece for piano and ensemble commissioned by the University of Alcalá de Henares (Madrid) in its 5th Century Anniversary; Finding Sarasate, commissioned by the University of Navarra to premiere on a Tribute Concert to Spanish composer Pablo Sarasate; and La Librería del Ingenioso Hidalgo, commissioned for the IV Centenary of Don Quixote's celebrations.
As piano interpreter Jusid has performed as a soloist in numerous tours in some of the most prestigious theaters in America, Asia and Europe, including the Carnegie Weill Hall, New York; Teatro Colón, Buenos Aires; Theater Platz, Frankfurt; Israel Philharmonic Orchestra House, Tel Aviv; St. Petersburg Philharmonic Hall, St. Petersburg; National Conservatory of China, Beijing; National Conservatory of Spain, Madrid, among others; He has also performed in Paris, Rome, Seoul, Shanghai, Sicily, Stockholm, Sofia, Helsinki, Buenos Aires, Madrid, Málaga and Aarau among other cities around the world.

Also as a resident performer of the Sonor Ensemble directed by Mtro. Luis Aguirre, Jusid has toured throughout Spain, Europe, South America and Asia.

== Works ==
=== Film music ===
Year	Title	Director
2026	Monitor	Matt Black and Ryan Polly
2024	Rest In Peace	Sebastián Borensztein
2023	Close Your Eyes	Victor Erice
2023	13 exorcisms	Jacobo Martinez
2021	The Perfect Family	Arantxa Echevarría
2020	Cross The Line	David Victori
2020	The Summer We Lived	Carlos Sedes
2020	Unknown Origins	David Galan Galindo
2019	Hernan	Norberto Lopez Amado
2019	Heroic Losers	Sebastián Borensztein
2018	Crime Wave	Gracia Querejeta
2018	Life Itself	Dan Fogelman
2018	A Twelve Year Night	Álvaro Brechner
2017	Loving Pablo	Fernando León de Aranoa
2017	The Last Suit	Pablo Solarz
2017	Kidnap	Luis Prieto
2017	The Hunter's Prayer	Jonathan Mostow
2017	Black Butterfly	Brian Goodman
2016	Neruda	Pablo Larraín
2016	Misconduct	Shintaro Shimosawa
2015	Francis, Father Jorge	Beda Docampo Feijoo
2015	Magallanes	Salvador del Solar
2015	Happy 140	Gracia Querejeta
2014	Exodus: Gods and Kings	Ridley Scott (additional music for the OST of Alberto Iglesias)
2014	The Ignorance of Blood	Manuel Gómez Pereira
2014	El Club de los incomprendidos	Carlos Sedes
2014	The Unexpected Life	Jorge Torregrossa
2014	Getulio	Joao Jardim
2014	Pancho The Millionaire Dog	Tom Fernández
2014	Betibú	Miguel Cohan
2012	Hold Up!	Eduard Cortés
2012	Everybody Has a Plan	Ana Piterbarg
2012	Audacia	Hatem Khraiche
2011	The Hidden Face	Andrés Baiz
2010	I Want to Be a Soldier	Christian Molina
2009	The Secret in Their Eyes	Juan José Campanella
2009	Che, A New Man	Tristán Bauer
2009	My Days With Gloria	Juan José Jusid
2007	Fermat's Room	Luis Piedrahíta & Rodrigo Sopeña
2007	Blinkers	Álvaro Fernández Armero
2007	Thieves	Jaime Marques
2006	The Hands	Alejandro Doria
2006	El Partido	Juan Calvo
2006	Olga, Victoria Olga	Mercedes Farriols
2005	The Minder	Rodrigo Moreno
2005	El Nexo	Sebastián Antico
2005	Los nombres de Alicia	Pilar Ruiz-Gutiérrez
2005	La Marea	Pablo Bravo
2004	Say I Do	Juan Calvo
2004	The Waiting, A Dancing Story	José Cabeza
2004	Los Años Robados	Fátima Gil & Manuel Gómez
2002	Passionate People	Juan José Jusid
2002	No Debes Estar Aquí	Jacobo Rispa
2001	The Escape	Eduardo Mignogna
2001	Rodrigo, la película	Juan Pablo Laplace
2000	Daddy Is My Idol	Juan José Jusid
1999	The Dammed Rib	Juan José Jusid
1998	An Argentinian in New York	Juan José Jusid
1997	Bajo Bandera	Juan José Jusid
1996	¿Dónde Estás Amor De Mi Vida...?	Juan José Jusid
1995	Muerte Dudosa	Juan José Jusid
1994	Peor Es Nada	Pablo Kova

=== TV series music ===
Year	Title	Season	Production company & Network
2026	Star City	Season 1	Apple TV
2025	A Thousand Blows	TV Miniseries	Disney+ / The Story Collective / Matriarch Productions / Water & Power Productions
2024	A Gentleman in Moscow	TV Miniseries	Vanity Film & TV/Popcorn Storm Pictures/ Lionsgate Television/ Paramount International
2024	The Asunta Case	TV Miniseries	Bambú Producciones / Netflix
2023	Yosi, The Regretful Spy	Season 1, 2	Amazon Prime Video
2022	The English	TV Miniseries	BBC Studios / Amazon Studios / Drama Republic / Eight Rook Productions / All3Media
2022	Santa Evita	TV Miniseries	Star+ / Hulu
2022	Now And Then	Season 1	Apple TV
2022	Boundless	TV Miniseries	Amazon Prime Video
2022	Heirs To The Land	TV Miniseries	Atresmedia / Netflix
2022	800 Meters	TV Miniseries	Bambú Producciones / Netflix
2022	Feria: The Darkest Light	TV Miniseries	Filmax / Netflix
2022	Jaguar	TV Miniseries	Bambú Producciones /Netflix
2021	Alive And Kicking	TV Miniseries	Movistar+
2020	The Head	Season 1, 2	MediaPro / Max
2019	High Seas	Season 1, 2, 3	Bambú Producciones
2019	Hernan	Season 1	Televisión Azteca Amazon Prime Video
2019	Wild District	Season 1, 2	Netflix
2019	Sitiados: México	Season 1	Star+
2019	The Alcasser Murders	TV Miniseries	Netflix
2019	14 de abril: La República	Season I, II	Diagonal TV /RTVE
2019	45 RPM	TV Miniseries	Bambú Producciones / Antena3
2018	Watership Down	TV Miniseries	42, Biscuit Filmworks / BBC
2018	Cathedral of the Sea	TV Miniseries	Diagonal TV / Antena3
2018	Fariña	TV Miniseries	Bambu Producciones / Antena3
2018	Morocco: Love in Times of War	Season 1	Bambu Producciones / Antena3
2017	El Caso Asunta: Operación Nenufar	TV Miniseries	Bambu Producciones / Antena3 Netflix
2015	Teresa	TV movie. Dir. Jorge Dorado	Televisión Española
2015	Charles, King Emperor	Season I	Diagonal Televisión / Televisión Española
2015	The Refugees	Season I	Bambú Producciones / BBC International
2015	Bajo sospecha	Season I	Bambú Producciones / A3Media
2014	Isabel, My Queen	Season III	Diagonal Televisión / Televisión Española
2014	The Mysteries of Laura	Season III	Ida Y Vuelta Pf / Televisión Española
2013	Gran Reserva	El pago de los Cortázar	Bambú Producciones / Televisión Española
2013	Gran Reserva: El origen	Season I	Bambú Producciones / Televisión Española
2013	Isabel, My Queen	Season II	Diagonal Televisión / Televisión Española
2012	Isabel, My Queen	Season I	Diagonal Televisión / Televisión Española
2012	14 de abril. La República	Season II	Diagonal Televisión / Televisión Española
2012	Gran Reserva	Season III	Bambú Producciones / Televisión Española
2012	Hispania, la leyenda	Final Season	Bambú Producciones / Antena 3
2012	The Mysteries of Laura	Season II	Ida Y Vuelta Pf / Televisión Española
2011	14 de abril. La República	Season I	Diagonal Televisión / Televisión Española
2011	Gran Reserva	Season II	Bambú Producciones /Televisión Española
2011	Hispania	Season II	Bambú Producciones / Antena 3
2011	The Mysteries of Laura	Season II	Ida Y Vuelta Pf / Televisión Española
2010	Hispania	Season I	Bambú Producciones /Antena 3
2010	Tierra de lobos	Season I	Multipark / Telecinco
2010	Gran Reserva	Season I	Bambú Producciones / Televisión Española
2010	El Gordo: Una historia verdadera	TV Miniserie	Zebra Producciones / Antena 3
2009	The Mysteries of Laura	Season I	Ida Y Vuelta Pf / Televisión Española
2009	De Repente Los Gomez	Season I	Sony Entertainment / Telecinco
2009	La Señora	Season II / III	Diagonal Televisión / Televisión Española
2009	No Estás Sola, Sara	TV movie. Dir. Carlos Sedes	Ficcionamedia/ Televisión Española
2009	La Familia Mata	Season III	Notrofilms / Antena 3
2008	Hermanos y Detectives	Season II	Cuatro Cabezas / Telecinco
2008	Hero Kids	TV Animation Series	Alma Ata International Pictures / Televisión Española
2008	Plan America	Season I	Notrofilms / Televisión Española
2008	La Familia Mata	Season II	Notrofilms / Antena 3
2008	La Señora	Season I	Diagonal Televisión / Televisión Española
2007	Hermanos y Detectives	Season I	Cuatro Cabezas / Telecinco
2007	Cuestión De Sexo	Season I	Notrofilms / Cuatro
2007	Aprendiendo A Vivir	TV movie – Dir. José Mª Caro	Grupo Ganga / Televisión Española
2007	La Familia Mata	Season I	Notrofilms / Antena 3
2007	Años Perdidos	TV movie – Dir. José Mª Caro	Grupo Ganga / Televisión Española
2006	Los Simuladores	Season I	Sony / Notrofilms / Cuatro
2003	El Pantano	Season I	Antena 3
1998	Drácula	Season I Dir. Diego Kaplan	América TV
1996	¿Dónde Estás Amor De Mi Vida...?	Season I Dir. Juan José Jusid	Canal 13

== Awards ==
Year	Film	Award	Category	Result
2024	Close Your Eyes	CEC Medals Circle of Cinematographic Writers Spain	Best Score	Nominated
2024	Close Your Eyes	11th Feroz Awards Spain	Best Original Score	Nominated
2023	The English	BAFTA TV Awards	Best Original Music, Fiction	Nominated
2023	The English	Royal Television Society Craft & Design Awards UK	Best Music Original Score – Scripted	Nominated
2023	The English	Movie Music UK Award	Best Original Score for Television	Nominated
2023	The English	International Film Music Critics Association IFMCA Award	Best Original Score for Television Series	Nominated
2022	Santa Evita	Silver Condor - First Prize Argentinean Film Critics Association Awards	Best Music in a Series	Won
2022	Yosi: The Regretful Spy	Silver Condor - First Prize Argentinean Film Critics Association Awards	Best Music in a Series	Won
2021	Federico Jusid	International Film Music Critics Association IFMCA Award	Film Composer of The Year	Nominated
2021	The Summer We Lived	35th Goya Awards	Best Original Score	Nominated
2021	Cross The Line	CEC Medals Circle of Cinematographic Writers Spain	Best Score	Nominated
2021	Cross The Line	8th Feroz Awards	Best Original Score	Nominated
2021	Unknown Origins	International Film Music Critics Association IFMCA Award	Best Original Score for an Action/Adventure/Thriller Film	Nominated
2019	Watership Down	Daytime Emmy Awards	Outstanding Music Direction and Composition	Nominated
2019	A Twelve-Year Night	6th Platino Awards	Best Original Score	Nominated
2019	Watership Down	International Film Music Critics Association IFMCA Award	Best Original Score for an Animated Film	Nominated
2019	Cathedral of the Sea	International Film Music Critics Association IFMCA Award	Best Original Score for a Television Series	Nominated
2018	A Twelve-Year Night	Uruguayan Film Critics Association Awards	Best Music	Nominated
2018	Morocco: Love in Times of War	International Film Music Critics Association IFMCA Award	Best Original Score Television	Nominated
2017	Neruda	4th Platino Awards	Best Original Music	Nominated
2016	Charles, Emperor King	International Film Music Critics Association IFMCA Award	Best Original Score Television	Won
2016	Getulio	3rd Platino Awards	Best Original Music	Nominated
2016	Magallanes	Macondo Awards	Best Original Score	Nominated
2015	Getulio	Grand Prize of Brazilian Cinema	Best Original Music	Nominated
2015	Francis, Father Jorge	Sur Award – Argentinian Academy of Arts & Cinema	Best Original Score	Nominated
2015	Isabel, My Queen S III	International Film Music Critics Association (IFMCA) Award	Best Original Score Television	Won
2015	Getùlio	Grand Prix of Brazilian Cinema – Brazilian Academy of Cinema	Best Original Score	Nominated
2015	The Unexpected Life	2nd Feroz Award – Spanish Cinematographic Informers Association	Best Original Score	Nominated
2015	Isabel, My Queen S III	Reel Music Award	Best Score Television	Won
2015	Isabel, My Queen S III	Iris Award – Spanish Television Academy	Best Original Score	Nominated
2015	Isabel, My Queen S III	Movie Music UK Award	Best Television Score	Nominated
2014	Betibú	Sur Award – Argentinian Academy of Arts & Cinema	Best Original Score	Nominated
2014	Isabel, My Queen S II	International Film Music Critics Association (IFMCA) Award	Best Original Score	Won
2014	Isabel, My Queen S II	Reel Music Award	Best Score Television	Won
2012	The Hidden Face	Macondo Awards	Best Original Score	Nominated
2010	The Secret in Their Eyes	24th Goya Award – Spanish Academy	Best Original Score	Nominated
2010	The Secret in Their Eyes	XXXI Havana Film Festival	Best Original Score	Won
2010	The Secret in Their Eyes	CEC Medals Circle of Cinematographic Writers Spain	Best Score	Nominated
2010	The Secret in Their Eyes	Sur Award – Argentinian Academy of Arts & Cinema	Best Original Score	Won
2010	The Secret in Their Eyes	XXII Clarin Award	Best Original Score	Won
2010	The Secret in Their Eyes	First Prize Silver Condor – Argentine Film Critics Association	Best Original Score	Won
2006	Olga, Victoria Olga	XXI Latin-American Film Festival of Trieste	Best Original Score	Won
2001	Rodrigo	"Linterna" Audience Award (Programme El acomodador – Argentina)	Best Original Score	Won
2001	The Escape	Pentagrama de Oro – XVI Mar de Plata International Film Festival	Best Original Score	Won
1998	Bajo Bandera	First Prize Silver Condor – Argentine Film Critics Association	Best Original Score	Won
