= Insatiable =

Insatiable may refer to:

== Music ==
- Insatiable (album) (2010), by Nadine Coyle
- Insatiable (Divide and Dissolve album) (2025)
- "Insatiable" (Prince song) (1992)
- "Insatiable" (Darren Hayes song) (2002)
- "Insatiable" (Elise Estrada song) (2007)
- "Insatiable" (Nadine Coyle song), title track and lead single

== Other ==
- Insatiable (film), a 1980 American pornographic film starring Marilyn Chambers
- Insatiable (TV series), a 2018 Netflix TV series
- The Insatiable (2006), American vampire horror film
- Diario de una ninfómana (2008), Spanish film, released in the US and Britain as Insatiable - Diary of a Nymphomaniac
- Insatiable (novel) (2003), memoir by Valérie Tasso
- "Insatiable" (Warehouse 13), an episode of the TV series Warehouse 13
