= Minglanilla (disambiguation) =

Minglanilla is a 1st class municipality in the province of Cebu, Philippines.

Minglanilla may also refer to:

- Minglanilla, Cuenca, Spain
- Minglanilla Science High School or in context simply "Minglanilla", a public science high school in Cebu, Philippines
