= Christian Molina =

Christian Molina may refer to:

- Christian Molina (director) (born 1979), Spanish director
- Christian Molina (footballer) (born 1998), Salvadorian footballer
