= The Alcàsser Murders =

Spanish-language docu-series on Netflix

- Genre: Documentary
- Directed by: Elías León
- Starring: Luisa Gómez; Martín García; Fernando García
- Country of origin: Spain
- Original language: Spanish
- No. of seasons: 1
- No. of episodes: 5

Production
- Running time: 53-66 min.

Original release
- Network: Netflix
- Release: 14 June 2019

The Alcàsser Murders (Spanish: El caso Alcàsser) is a Spanish true crime documentary television series that premiered on Netflix on 14 June 2019, directed by Elías León and starring Luisa Gómez, Martín García and Fernando García. It explores the 1992 event of three teenage girls from the small town of Alcàsser, Spain being kidnapped, raped, tortured and murdered and the media circus it created in the country at the time.

== Premise ==
The Alcàsser Murders explores the 1992 event of three teenage girls from the small town of Alcàsser, Spain being kidnapped, raped, tortured and murdered and the media circus it created in the country at the time. The series contains new interviews and archival footage of news reports and eye-witness accounts.

== Cast ==
- Luisa Gómez
- Martín García
- Fernando García
- José Manuel Alcayna
- Teresa Domínguez
- Yolanda Laguna
- Ana Sanmartín
- Elías León
- Patricia Murray
