= Antonio Anglés =

Missing Brazilian-Spanish criminal

- Born: Antonio Anglés Martins; 25 July 1966 (age 60); São Paulo, Brazil
- Disappeared: 18 March 1993 (aged 26)
- Status: Missing for 33 years and 8 months
- Occupation: Fugitive
- Height: 5 ft 9 in (1.75 m)
- Convictions: Kidnapping, rape, murder, illegal possession of weapons and unlawful burials
- Capture status: Not caught

Details
- Victims: Alcasser Girls
- Imprisoned at: 1990

Antonio Anglés Martins (born 25 July 1966) is a Brazilian-Spanish criminal and fugitive with criminal records for mugging, robbery and drug trafficking. He lived in his native Brazil for a year before moving to Spain. According to his relatives and friends, Anglés was known as a habitually violent criminal who frequently beat up his mother.

Anglés is best known for his alleged participation in the kidnappings, tortures, rapes, and murders of Desirée Hernández, Miriam García, and Antonia Gómez, collectively known as the "Alcàsser Girls", which took place in Alcàsser, Valencia.

== Life ==
Some raised doubts about the 25 July 1966 date of Anglés Martins' birth in São Paulo because the reports of the Spanish Civil Guards and the Police show different dates. Aside from this discrepancy, however, his early life has been documented. He was the fourth of nine children of Enrique Anglés and Neusa Martins, who were married in February 1959. By 1968, the family moved to Spain where they resided in a Valencia town called Catarroja. Sources show that Anglés Martins started living on his own in 1991 when he moved to 101 Camí Real in Catarroja.

He spent two years in prison for kidnapping, chaining and hitting 20-year-old Nuria Pera Mateu in January 1990, apparently for stealing some grams of heroin from him. The woman's life was saved thanks to the intervention of one of Anglés' brothers. Given a chance for social reintegration, he received penitentiary leave of six days in 1992, and he took advantage of it to escape, with the result that he didn't finish his sentence and he was from that point on an arrest warrant.

== The Alcàsser crime ==
On the night of 13 November 1992 Antonio Anglés, well known as Asukiki or "Sugar", went for a drive in the Opel Corsa of his friend Miguel Ricart Tárrega (Catarroja, 1969) who was with him. While they were driving along the road they saw three girls who were hitchhiking to a party which the Picassent High School was holding in the Coolor nightclub. Anglés asked them if they were going to Coolor and so the three girls got into the car.

When they arrived at Coolor, Anglés told Ricart to continue driving. The girls started screaming. Right after, Anglés pulled out a 9 mm short calibre Star gun. He hit them with the butt of the gun and then he tied them up. Ricart drove the car to Catadau. This was the area where Anglés used to hide when the Guardia Civil were looking for him. He suggested the half fallen hut of La Romana as a place to take the girls. Two of the girls were raped by both Anglés and Ricart. Later, they decided to tie them up and return to the town to look for food. When they came back, they raped the third girl. Then they dug a pit and forced them to go into it, where they shot and buried them. They picked up the cartridges of the gun and cleaned the car.

An intense search to find the girls began. On 27 January 1993, after heavy rains, the soil softened and the bodies appeared. Two beekeepers who were taking care of their beehives came across the pit. In the investigation, the Civil Guard found one of Ricart's gloves; a social security slip in the name of Enrique Anglés Martins, Antonio's brother; and a gun cartridge in the pit.

== Fugitive from Police ==
Anglés was not in his house when the Civil Guard went there looking for his brother Enrique. He escaped and hid for a month in a Valencian town, pursued by the Guardia Civil and the police. He was almost captured in Vilamarxant, but he managed to escape the extensive police cordon which had been set up. He appeared again in Minglanilla (Cuenca) some days later, the last place in Spain where he was seen before being subsequently spotted in Lisbon in March 1993. From this point on, there are two theories: The first says that he boarded the boat City of Plymouth as a stowaway, before jumping overboard on being discovered near the coast of Ireland. Thereafter, his trail was lost, and he is believed to have died from cold or drowning in those waters. The second theory simply assumes that in Lisbon he boarded a ship for Brazil, his native country, and he managed to get there and enter the country with his Brazilian passport since he had dual nationality (Spanish and Brazilian), but the reality is that until the present day nothing is known about his whereabouts.

In February 2021, the Court of Valencia reactivated the search for Anglés, ordering the ship's captain and a worker from a Lisbon transport company (with whom the fugitive allegedly had a telephone conversation) to be interrogated again. According to the official account, a British sailor named Jo Hannegan caught a stowaway (possibly Anglés) on the City of Plymouth container ship, which was sailing from Lisbon to Liverpool, at around 2.45 am on 23 March 1993 (five days after the ship had left Lisbon). The sailor then locked him in a cabin, but when he checked on him at 7.30 am the next morning, he found the detainee had escaped through the window. The stowaway was later spotted by a French reconnaissance aircraft drifting on a raft off the coast of Ireland, and the ship circled back to pick him up. He was again locked into a cabin until the ship docked in Dublin later that day, however, when the Irish police came aboard to arrest the man he was missing again, this time having used a rope to reach the docks from the cabin window.

After 21 years in prison, Ricart was released on 29 November 2013 and gave a series of interviews in which he still maintained his innocence, alleging a conspiracy that pinned him as a scapegoat. According to Interpol's records, Antonio Anglés Martins is still included in its most wanted criminals list. He is described in its database as 1.75 metres tall and has blue eyes. He is charged with kidnapping, rape, murder, unlawful burial, and illegal possession of weapons.

== See also ==
- List of fugitives from justice who disappeared

== Bibliography ==
- Pérez Abellán, Francisco (2002). Alcácer, punto final: toda la verdad diez años después. Barcelona: Martínez Roca. ISBN 84-270-2913-6.
- F.P.A. Libertad digital suplementos. "El asesinato de las niñas de Alcàsser, violación y más hechos".
- S.B. El País. "Catarroja pide perdón".
- M.A./S.V. El País. "Antonio Anglés, retrato de un superviviente".
- Martínez Laínez, Fernando (1993). Sin piedad. Barcelona: Ediciones B. ISBN 84-406-4178-8.
- R.B.C. ABC. "Los delitos de Anglés no prescribirán hasta 2029".
- P. Muñoz (30 November 2013). "Interpol mantiene a Antonio Anglés entre los delincuentes más buscados del mundo". ABC.
