= Alcàsser Girls =

1992 triple child murder case in Alcàsser, Valencia, Spain

Desirée Hernández Miriam García Antonia Gómez
- Poster asking for information regarding the disappearance of the Alcàsser Girls (Desirée Hernández, Miriam García, and Antonia Gómez)
- Born: Desirée: 7 February 1978; Miriam: 28 July 1978; Antonia: 25 May 1977
- Disappeared: 13 November 1992
- Died: November 1992; La Romana, near Pantano de Tous (Valencia), Spain
- Cause of death: Shooting after torture
- Body discovered: 27 January 1993

Desirée Hernández Folch, Miriam García Iborra and Antonia Gómez Rodríguez, collectively known as the Alcàsser Girls (Valencian: Les xiquetes d'Alcàsser, Spanish: Las niñas de Alcácer), were three teenage girls from Alcàsser, Valencia, Spain, who were kidnapped, raped, tortured and murdered after hitchhiking to visit a nightclub in the nearby town of Picassent on 13 November 1992. The case became notorious within Spain due to the brutality of the crimes, the highly criticised police investigation and the resulting media coverage.

Autopsies revealed the existence of seven hairs with seven distinct DNA profiles, none of them belonging to any of the girls or either of their alleged murderers, Antonio Anglés and Miguel Ricart. Of the two, Ricart was the only one jailed; the whereabouts of Anglés, still among Interpol's most wanted criminals, remains unknown.

== Disappearance ==
On 13 November 1992, Miriam García, Antonia 'Toñi' Gómez and Desirée Hernández, all from the municipality of Alcàsser, sought to attend a secondary school party scheduled to be held at Coolor, a popular discothèque located on the outskirts of Picassent, four kilometres away. Miriam asked her father, Fernando García, to pick them up and drive them to the club, but he was suffering from influenza and was unable to do so. The girls thus resorted to hitchhiking, as they had done the previous summer. A young couple from Alcàsser took the three girls to a petrol station near Picassent, where a resident witnessed them climb into a sedan – thought to be a white Opel Corsa – carrying a group of men. It was the last time the girls would be seen alive.

== Crime scene reconstruction ==
Miguel Ricart was the only person charged regarding the crime. According to his statement, he and Antonio Anglés picked up the girls at the petrol station. When the men continued driving past the nightclub the girls had requested to go to, they began to scream, resulting in Anglés pistol-whipping them with the handle of a Star Model BM handgun. They then headed to a derelict, abandoned house near a place known as Barranco de La Romana, in a very isolated and mountainous area, close to the Tous dam. Here, two of the girls were raped. Afterwards, they were taken to Catadau in-search of food but could not escape. The men then raped the third girl, over two hours later. After being tortured and toyed-with for hours throughout the night, the girls were made to enter a pit (which the men had already dug), where they were assaulted further. According to the official autopsy, Hernández suffered a traumatic, unprofessional removal of her right nipple and areola with a sharpened (yet semi-blunt) object, and was then stabbed twice in the back. The other girls were stoned and beaten with tree branches (which did not kill them) before finally being shot and buried. García's corpse showed evidence of vaginal wounds caused by a sharp-edged object, possibly from sticks or wood, and potentially inflicted postmortem. The killers attempted to retrieve their spent shell casings and clean the vehicle of any possible evidence, though several items linking them to the crime scene would be found.

== Investigation ==
From the moment the girls were reported missing, an intensive search was conducted to try to find them. Their bodies were found on 27 January 1993, 75 days after their murders, by two beekeepers in a ditch located near La Romana ravine. Previous heavy rains softened the land, causing the corpses to appear from their improvised grave. It was soon confirmed that they had apparently been tortured and murdered. At the scene, the Spanish Civil Guard found one of Ricart's gloves, a Social Security referral note on behalf of Anglés' brother Enrique, and a shell casing. Spanish television channels quickly rushed to Alcàsser to cover the grief of the girls' families and the overwhelmed town.

Anglés was not at home when the Civil Guard appeared in search of Enrique, leading to a national manhunt. The last sighting of Anglés in Spain was near Minglanilla, Cuenca, after which he went to Lisbon, and stowed away on board the container ship City of Plymouth. He is assumed to have died when he reportedly jumped overboard off the coast of Ireland, either instantly or from subsequent cold and/or drowning. Alternative theories state that Anglés evaded capture and, as a native of Brazil, is traveling under his Brazilian passport.

== Aftermath ==
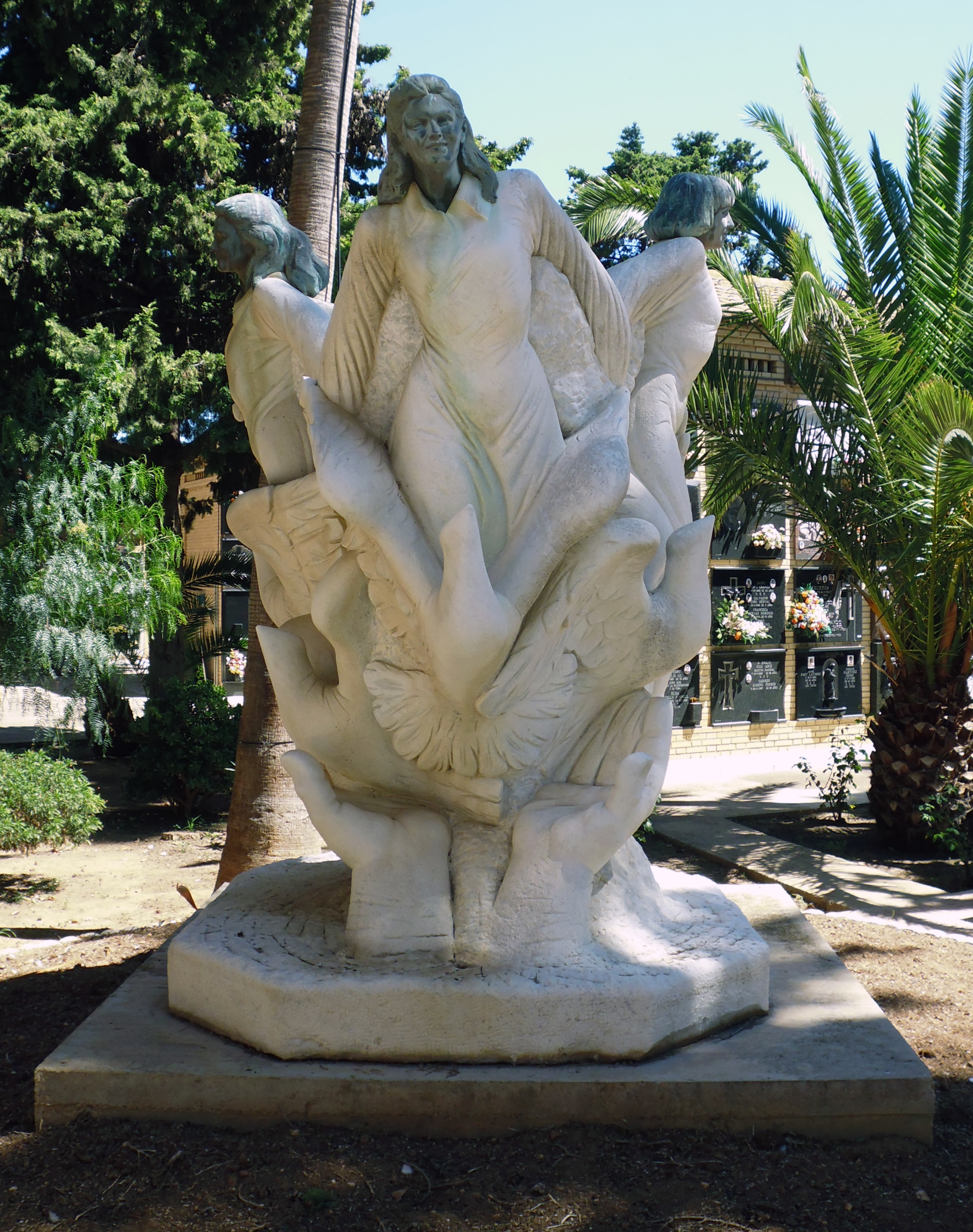
Alcàsser Girls' monument

Miguel Ricart was sentenced to 170 years in prison; however, at the time, the maximum physical prison sentence was 30 years, and this was the most time he was expected to serve behind bars. He was later released in 2013, after 21 years, following a ruling by the Court of Justice of the European Union. The Court of Justice declared that using the Parot doctrine to prevent sentence reduction for good behaviour, post-conviction, was against the principle that a prisoner's sentence "cannot be increased retroactively".

Upon his release, Ricart disappeared from the spotlight, apparently living for some time in the South of France. He was later identified in Madrid in 2020, after being caught trying to buy illicit substances in a "squat" or "drughouse".

The trial of the two arrested suspects became a primetime, sensationalistic showcase. In a rather controversial move, news and other television programs aired gruesome crime scene photos, both of the location of the girls' bodies and of the bodies themselves (preceded by televised warnings for viewing audiences). This decision was widely criticised. Many felt that publicising the graphic crime scene photos was unethical due to the girls' young ages, and that it violated not only their privacy (and that of their families), but indeed compromised the integrity of the entire case—a case which thus may never be solved.

== Books ==
- Jenny Ashford – The Faceless Villain: Volume Three
- Nerea Barjola - "The Sexist Microphysics of Power"

== Netflix documentary ==
- Netflix released a five-part documentary series entitled The Alcàsser Murders in June 2019. There are several interviews included in it: Juan Ignacio Blanco, Fernando García, Jerónimo Boloix, Paco Lobatón, Neusa Martins and Luisa Gómez.

== See also ==
- Aguilar de Campoo case
- List of fugitives from justice who disappeared
- Lists of solved missing person cases
- Marc Dutroux
