= Valérie Tasso =

French writer, lecturer and sex therapist

- Born: 23 January 1969 (age 57); Champagne-Ardenne, France
- Occupations: Writer and Sexologist

Valérie Tasso is a French writer, lecturer, research worker, and sex therapist, currently living in Barcelona, Spain. She has several university degrees (Economical Sciences, Foreign Applied languages), and in 2006, she graduated in Sex Therapy from The Institute of Sexology (IN.CI.SEX El Instituto de Sexología,) in Madrid.

In 1999, she worked as a prostitute for six months, out of curiosity. In 2003, she wrote her sexual experiences in the book Insatiable – The sexual adventures of a French Girl in Spain. This first book has been an international best-seller, and is the basis of the script for the film Diary of a Nymphomaniac directed by Christian Molina. She has written three more books.

In February 2008, and following the idea of the French philosopher Michel Foucault, she published an essay called Anti-manual of sex in which she tries to demonstrate that we never speak of sex, but of what she calls "the sexual standardized speech", made of topics and clichés. She collaborates in different Spanish media (TV, radio), and writes press articles.

Her slogan: "Whoever ignores the reasons for the rules is condemned to respect them."

== Works ==
- 2003 – Diario de una ninfómana (Plaza y Janés) translated in English in 2005 as "Insatiable: The sexual adventures of a French girl in Spain" (Corgi Books)
- 2004 – Paris la nuit (Plaza y Janés)
- 2006 – El otro lado del sexo (Plaza y Janés)
- 2008 – Antimanual de sexo (Temas de hoy)
