= Lolita's Club =

- Theatrical release poster
- Spanish: Canciones de amor en Lolita's Club
- Directed by: Vicente Aranda
- Written by: Vicente Aranda
- Produced by: Andrés Vicente Gómez
- Starring: Eduardo Noriega, Flora Martínez, Belén Fabra; Héctor Colomé
- Cinematography: José Luis Alcaine
- Edited by: Teresa Font
- Music by: José Nieto
- Production companies: Lolafilms; Trivisión
- Distributed by: Flat inema S.L
- Release date: 30 November 2007 (Spain)
- Running time: 101 minutes
- Country: Spain
- Language: Spanish
- Box office: €360,749

Lolita's Club (Spanish: Canciones de amor en Lolita's Club) is a 2007 Spanish film written and directed by Vicente Aranda and starring Eduardo Noriega and Flora Martínez. The plot follows the story of twin brothers — one a coldhearted violent police officer, the other a helpless romantic with a mental disability. The two brothers are tragically involved with a prostitute who works in the bordello that gives the film its title. The film was adapted from the novel Canciones de Amor en Lolita's Club written by Juan Marsé.

== Plot ==
Raúl Fuentes, a brooding police officer prone to violence and alcohol, is placed on unpaid leave after he has beaten Moncho Tristán, the son of a local drug trafficker. Mazuera, a snitch from a drug mafia ring, tells Raúl that members of the drug clan are looking for him to kill him. Mazuera strikes a deal with Raúl. He would give him some documents that prove the involvement of the Tristán family in drug trafficking and prostitution if Raúl agrees to reveal the story only after Mazuera has left the country. Raúl decides to leave the incident on hold and travels from Pontevedra to Alicante where his family lives.

Raúl's visit, the first in two years, takes his family by surprise. His father, José, is not thrilled to see him. Their relationship has become tense due to the fact that Olga, José’s young wife, was originally Raúl's girlfriend. With the exception of his twin brother, Valentin, Raúl does not care about anybody. Valentín, who is mentally disabled, is the opposite of his brother: sweet, soft and well liked by everyone. When Raúl finds out that his brother is working in a nightclub and has fallen in love with one of the prostitutes, he gets very upset and goes in search of Valentín at the bordello, called Lolita's Club.

In Lolita's Club, Raúl confronts Milena, the prostitute that is his brother's love interest. The beautiful Milena is an immigrant from Colombia, who has left behind her daughter under the care of her mother and works to provide them with a better life, sending them money frequently. Although only twenty five years old, Milena is the oldest and the most popular of the girls at the club. The other girls are mostly under-age, like Nancy, who is from Cuba, and Jasmina, who is from Ecuador. A hard nocturnal life of prostitution and drugs has taken its toll on Milena. She is goodhearted and really cares about Valentín. Valentín works at Lolita's Club doing the errands for the girls and is liked and protected by all.

Raúl warns Milena that she needs to break off her close attachment to his naive brother. Valentín, traumatized by the relationship that his brother had with Olga, is afraid that Raúl might get involved with Milena. Indeed, sexual tension begins to arise between Raúl and Milena. Things are further complicated with the links that the policeman and the prostitute have with the mafia. Raúl hatches a plan to have sex with Milena and have his brother catch them in the act. The scheme unfolds accordingly, with Valentin storming out of the club after he catches his brother engaged in sexual activity with Milena. Valentin gets into Raúl's car and imagines he is racing off, even though he cannot drive. At that moment, two hit men sent by the mafia pull up to the car and, mistaking Valentín for his brother, shoot and kill him.

After Valentin's funeral, Raúl is a broken man with no one to turn to for understanding. Even Olga is now indifferent towards his pain. He has joyless sex with Maria, a female coworker, who comes to inform him of the killing of Mazuera by members of the mafia ring. Raúl confronts Tristán but he is not looking for revenge. Instead, he demands Milena's passport and freedom from the net of prostitution. Back at Lolita's club, Raúl offers Milena her passport and freedom and declares his love for her. She rejects him and only retains her documents. She wants to keep making money. Raúl reminds her of Valentín's tragic end. Of the two brothers it was Valentín who she liked and loved. Later, Raúl enters Milena's room at the club just as Valentín used to do, taking over his brother's personality.

== Cast ==
- Eduardo Noriega as Raúl\Valentín
- Flora Martínez as Milena
- Héctor Colomé as José
- Belén Fabra as Olga
- Yunet Guerra as Nancy
- César Mora as Mazuera
- Carla Sanchez as Maria
- Xosé Manuel Olveira 'Pico' as Tristán
- Andrea Ramos as Rebeca
- Yohana Cobo as Djasmina
- Vicente Gil as Simón
- Lara de Miguel as Bárbara
- Irene Escolar as Jeniffer

== Production ==
The film is a Lolafilms and Trivisión production. Shooting locations included Alicante and Benidorm.

== DVD release ==
The film was released on DVD in the U.S. in March 2009 in Spanish with English subtitles, as the options offered.
