= Alcàsser =

Alcàsser Alcácer
- Municipality
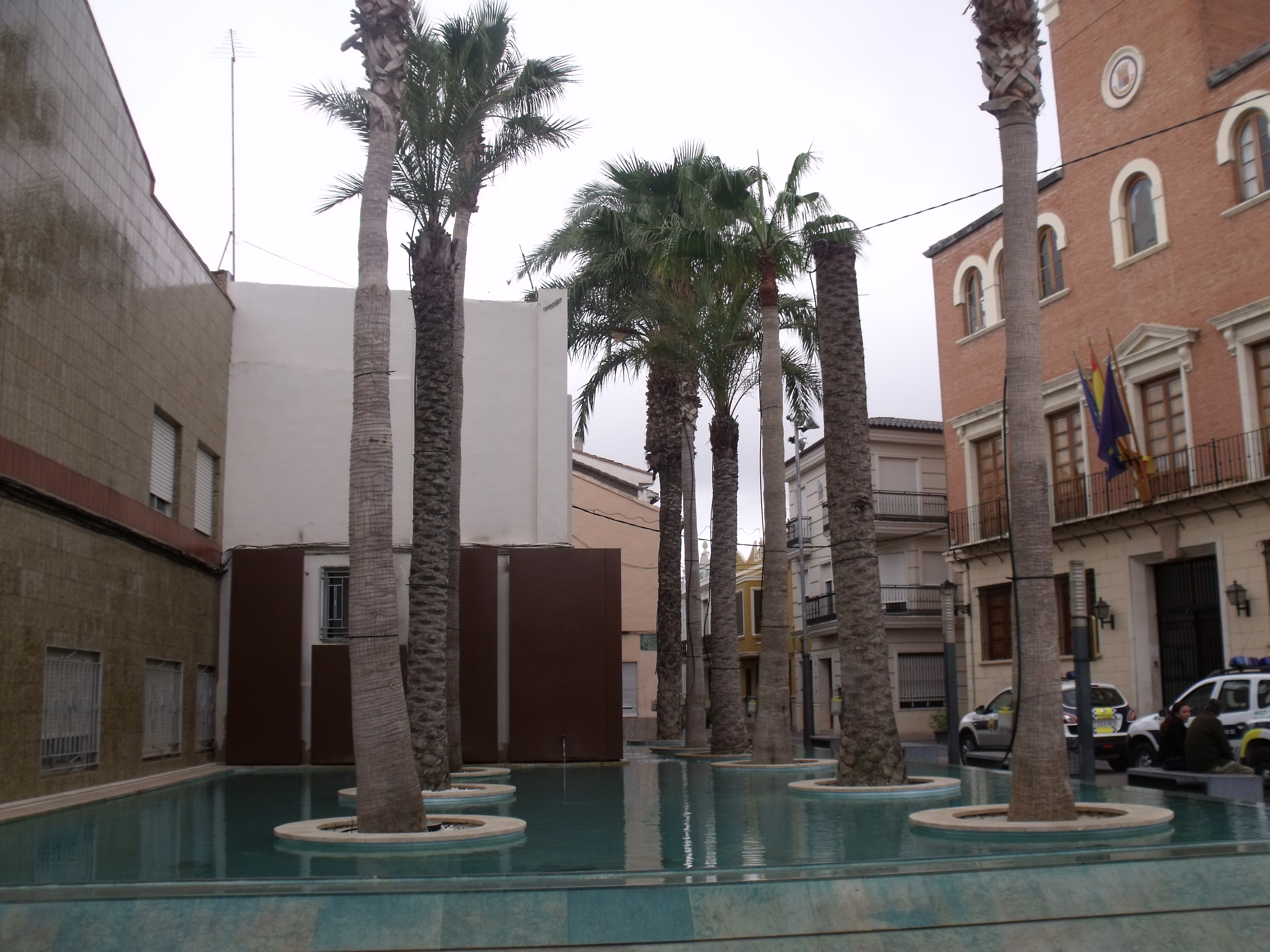

- Coat of arms

- Location in Spain Alcàsser (Valencian Community) Alcàsser (Spain)
- Coordinates: 39°22′10″N 0°26′41″W
- Country: Spain
- Autonomous community: Valencian Community
- Province: València / Valencia
- Comarca: Horta Sud
- Judicial district: Picassent

Area
  - Total: 9.01 km^{2} (3.48 sq mi)
- Elevation: 15 m (49 ft)

Population (2025-01-01)
  - Total: 10,772
  - Density: 1,200/km^{2} (3,100/sq mi)
- Demonyms: • alcasser, -a (Val.) • alcacero, -ra (Sp.)
- Time zone: UTC+1 (CET)
  - Summer (DST): UTC+2 (CEST)
- Postal code: 46290
- Official language(s): Valencian and Spanish
- Website: Official website

Alcàsser (Valencian: [alˈkaseɾ]; Spanish: Alcácer [alˈkaθeɾ]) is a municipality in the comarca of Horta Sud in the Valencian Community, Spain.

== History ==
=== Alcàsser murders ===
Between 1992 and 1993, Alcàsser attracted national attention due to the disappearance and murder of three schoolgirls Desirée Hernández, Miriam García, and Antonia Gómez. On 13 November 1992, they went missing while hitchhiking to a nightclub in the nearby town of Picassent. In January 1993, 75 days after their disappearance, their bodies were found in a ditch located near La Romana ravine.

Their alleged murderers were Antonio Anglés and Miguel Ricart. Of the two, Ricart was the only one jailed; the whereabouts of Anglés, still among Interpol's most wanted criminals, remains unknown.

A sculpture was made in memory of the girls.

== See also ==
- Alcàsser Girls
- List of municipalities in Valencia
