= Don't Listen =

- Theatrical release poster
- Spanish: Voces
- Directed by: Ángel Gómez Hernández
- Screenplay by: Santiago Díaz
- Story by: Ángel Gómez; Víctor Gado
- Starring: Rodolfo Sancho; Ana Fernández; Ramón Barea; Belén Fabra; Lucas Blas; Nerea Barros
- Cinematography: Pablo Rosso
- Edited by: Victoria Martín; Mario Sierra
- Music by: Jesús Díaz
- Production companies: Feelgood Media; Kowalski Films; LaNube; Estudio V
- Distributed by: eOne Films Spain
- Release date: 24 July 2020
- Running time: 97 minutes
- Country: Spain
- Language: Spanish

Don't Listen (Spanish: Voces, lit. 'Voices') is a 2020 Spanish supernatural horror thriller film directed by Ángel Gómez Hernández in his feature film debut. Its cast features Rodolfo Sancho, Ana Fernández, Ramón Barea, and Belén Fabra, among others.

When a family relocate to a haunted house, their lives are upended by psychophonies. Seasoned parapsychologist Germán and his daughter Ruth (a skeptical sound engineer) come in to provide help to Daniel.

== Plot ==
Daniel and Sara, who renovate and resell houses, move into a new home with their 8-year-old son Eric. He is troubled by insomnia and hearing voices which tell him to make creepy crayon drawings, so they bring in a psychologist. The doctor tells them that these disturbances are attributable to lack of stability, but that he will settle down. However, Eric draws a bloody branch, and while the psychologist drives home, a supernatural fly harasses her until she drives into a tree and is killed by a branch.

The house is so large, and Eric's bedroom so distant from his parents', that they frequently communicate via walkie-talkie. Daniel discovers that their new house is infested by flies and tries unsuccessfully to eliminate them. Unexplained events start to happen: they develop inexplicable stigmata-like scratches on their skin; a locked gate unlocks itself; Eric's toy robot starts up by itself and talks; and he thinks his father is expressing hatred for him over the walkie-talkie. One night, Daniel finds Eric drowned in the swimming pool.

Sara leaves for a few days. The hauntings focus then on Daniel: he leaves a phone message for her, then hears Eric crying for help when he replays it, and the walkie-talkie crackles with static when he goes near it. He purchases a book, Sounds from the Great Beyond (Sonidos de Más Allá), during a book signing by parapsychologist Germán Domingo and demands his help. Germán and his daughter, audio engineer Ruth, come over. Ruth's ghost hunting gear includes half a dozen computer monitors, cameras with infrared-viewing capability for the rooms used by the family, EMF meters, headphones, and thermal imagers. Almost at once she orders Daniel out of the house as he is interfering, but in fact he is outside, and her kit is detecting someone invisible in Eric's bedroom. Germán investigates in there, and Ruth begs him to leave the room, because there is a specter right in front of him; a burst of noise in his headphones convinces him to join the others.

That night, Germán is awakened by the apparition of his dead wife, Sofia; in the vision, she knifes his arm, saying he will join her. Ruth wakes him and he finds he has sleepwalked and cut himself. Meanwhile, Sara receives a phone call from Eric, who says he is hiding under his bed and begs her to help him against Germán, who wants to hurt him. She drives to the house and sees the men burying the corpses of cats which they had found hanged in a tree. She goes to Eric's bedroom, where she sees his ghost playing with his toy robot; he vanishes, and she encounters a corpse-like witch (bruja). Ruth comes in and tells them that the house is on the grounds of a courthouse used for Spanish Inquisition trials. Sara's body crashes through the window; she has hanged herself. Ruth tells Germán that they are leaving and begins to pack her equipment, but he wants to stay and learn the historical truth of the estate. In Eric's room, Daniel sees the ghosts of his wife and his son, then is attacked by an invisible malevolent force.

They realize that the evil is caused by the ghosts of those immured in the dungeon, the source of the flies, so Daniel breaks down the basement wall which he had already fixed. They find a caged skeleton of a woman upon whom the Inquisitors had used the pear of anguish to prevent her from uttering maledictions. Daniel goes to find gasoline so they can burn the skeleton and free the demon. Ruth is visited by Sofia's ghost, but refuses to approach her, and Sofia takes on her demonic wraith form and possesses her. The ghosts of Eric and Sara beg Daniel to join them and he pours the gasoline over his head to immolate himself. Ruth stabs Germán, but he burns the skeleton just in time to free her. While she bandages him, he says light-heartedly that he is looking forward to an exorcism that his priest friend has invited him to attend. Daniel visits Eric's room one last time, then sees the disturbing drawings on the walls: they each portray part of the hauntings and deaths that afflicted them. One, however, depicts him as possessed and drowning Eric; another shows him shooting himself. Daniel takes his gun down to the pool and kills himself. A post-credits scene shows Germán and Ruth watching footage of the exorcism.

== Cast ==
- Rodolfo Sancho as Daniel Velasco
- Belén Fabra as Sara Velasco
- Lucas Blas as Eric Velasco
- Ramón Barea as Germán Domingo
- Ana Fernández as Ruth Domingo
- Nerea Barros as Sofia
- Beatriz Arjona as Dr. Carol, Psicóloga
- Javier Botet as Cliente de librería
- Álvaro Fontalba as Bruja #1
- Aitor Toro as Bruja #2
- José Bermúdez as Bruja Joven

== Production ==
The screenplay was penned by Santiago Díaz, based on an original story by Ángel Gómez and Víctor Gado. The film is a Feelgood Media, Kowalski Films, LaNube, and Estudio V production, with the participation of RTVE and Canal Sur, and support from ICAA. Shooting locations included Torrelodones.

== Release ==
Distributed by eOne Films Spain, the film was theatrically released in Spain on 24 July 2020.

== Reception ==
Chad Collins of Dread Central rated the film 4 out of 5 stars, assessing that "not every jump scare in Don't Listen works, but those that do work like gangbusters", with the film managing to be "gnarly and mean in ways that most haunted house movies aren't".

Daniel Quesada of HobbyConsolas rated the film 79 out of 100 points ("good"), considering that while it is clear that the film is not precisely inventing the wheel, it turns out to be a "great bet for summer terror and has the potential to be part of something bigger". The Forbes review said similarly that the revelation that the ghosts are witches is "disappointing": "While the Inquisition, and witch trials over the centuries, have killed many innocent women, Don't Listen perpetrates the myth of the witch who torments and kills for no other reason than they are 'evil.' Don't Listen is [a] great debut feature, that uses all the well-known tropes of the haunted house horror film. It is an intriguing story, but in the end it does not quite come together."

On the review aggregator website Rotten Tomatoes, 71% of 7 critics' reviews are positive.

== See also ==
- List of Spanish films of 2020
