= Diary of a Nymphomaniac =

- Spanish theatrical release poster
- Spanish: Diario de una ninfómana
- Directed by: Christian Molina
- Screenplay by: Cuca Canals
- Based on: Insatiable: The Sexual Adventures of a French Girl in Spain by Valérie Tasso
- Produced by: Julio Fernández; Mariví de Villanueva
- Starring: Belén Fabra; Leonardo Sbaraglia; Llum Barrera; Ángela Molina; Geraldine Chaplin
- Cinematography: Javier Salmones
- Edited by: Luis de la Madrid
- Music by: Roque Baños; Mariano Marín
- Production companies: Castelao Productions; Canónigo Films
- Distributed by: Filmax Entertainment
- Release date: 17 October 2008 (Spain)
- Running time: 101 minutes
- Country: Spain
- Language: Spanish

Diary of a Nymphomaniac (Spanish: Diario de una ninfómana) is a 2008 Spanish erotic drama film directed by Christian Molina and starring Belén Fabra and Leonardo Sbaraglia. It is based on the 2005 autobiographical novel Insatiable: The Sexual Adventures of a French Girl in Spain by French author Valérie Tasso. In the United States and the United Kingdom, the film was released under the title Insatiable: Diary of a Sex Addict.

== Plot ==
Val is a 28-year-old hypersexual woman who has many sexual partners, including Alex who has a girlfriend. Alex got tired of Val's excessive sexual needs and angrily breaks up with her. Val later goes to an empty train station, where she meets a stranger and has sex with him.

Val is disturbed by her behavior and sexual needs. She discusses her sex life openly with her grandmother, who encourages her to do as she pleases. The grandmother also suggests Val keep a diary as it can help provide clarity. When an old friend, Hassan, visits Barcelona, she leaves work early in order to have sex with him. The following day, Val shows up late for work, which eventually leads to her dismissal from the job.

Val attends two job interviews. The second interviewer, Jaime, is attracted to her and asks her out; she immediately accepts. Against her usual self, Val decides not to have sex with him after their first date. Jaime quickly buys an expensive home for both of them, though Val is worried about his extravagant lifestyle. In the meantime, Val visits her grandmother, who is ill and eventually dies.

Val and Jaime move in together. Val is disappointed by Jaime's performance the first time they have sex, but she decides to ignore it. She also secures a job from her first interview. However, Val soon realizes that Jaime is bipolar and he constantly flips between kind affection and cruel abuse. One day, Jaime walks into Val's office unannounced and accuses her boss of having sex with her. On another occasion, he brings a prostitute to their house and asks Val to pay her. Val decides to leave Jaime and move out. When Val is packing her belongings with the help of her friend Sonia, Jaime shows up and threatens Val. They manage to leave and go to Sonia's house.

One day, Sonia realizes that Val left her house without informing her. Sonia tracks her down to a small run-down apartment. Unemployed and having lost all her savings to pay for Jaime's extravagant lifestyle, a depressed Val contemplates suicide by jumping from her apartment window, but eventually decides against it. Desperate for money, Val decides to work as a prostitute in a brothel, where the madam controls all the women working for her. Val meets a Brazilian woman, Cindy, who works for the same brothel and they become close.

Val starts to enjoy her work and soon attracts regular customers, including an Italian named Giovanni, with whom she falls in love. Val is excited when he books her again, but when she meets him in his hotel suite, he has decided to give her to his friend. Pedro, another customer, keeps on telling her that he loves her and wants to marry her, but he tries to control her with his money and wants to have overly aggressive sex with her. Without bothering to collect her money, Val runs away from his hotel suite. When she returns to the brothel the following day, Cindy kills herself by jumping out from a window.

Val starts to re-evaluate her life and soon decides this is not the life she wants. She informs the madam that she wants to leave the brothel. Though the madam tries to convince her to stay and then abuses her and threatens her, Val is determined and leaves the brothel.

Val goes to Sonia's house. Sonia is happily married to a man, and Val informs her that she has left the brothel. Sonia is very happy for Val. When Val returns to her apartment, she sees a man living in her apartment building who she noticed peeping on her earlier. She asks him if he wants to go to her place. He replies that he does not have any money, to which she replies, "That's okay, it's not necessary", indicating that she has resorted to her old way of free-spirited living.

== Cast ==
- Belén Fabra as Val
- Leonardo Sbaraglia as Jaime
- Ángela Molina as Cristina
- Llum Barrera as Sonia
- Antonio Garrido as Giovanni
- Geraldine Chaplin as Abuela (Grandmother)

== Reception ==
The movie received mixed reviews. Jay Seaver of eFilmCritic.com wrote: "...while I still think it hangs around those [art-porn] stereotypes enough to be somewhat hurt by them, I did find the film improving in my mind as I reflected on it".

Nathan Southern wrote for TV Guide: "Though competently acted, well scored, and lushly photographed...Christian Molina’s...erotic drama...represents an ugly and pretentious blight on the face of its chosen subgenre".

Jonathan Henderson of Cinelogue stated: "[T]he film...in its heavy-handed crudeness...plays out like a typical, manipulative melodrama. ...Another element that plagues the film is its unrealistic depictions of misogynistic men. [It] is marked by an overtly formulaic script, which too neatly follows the three-act structure with a pattern of introduction, elation, conflict, descent and recovery. The film’s pacing problems are exacerbated by a profusion of abbreviated, deficient scenes which interrupt the flow of the narrative. [Belén] Fabra’s performance during [her] emotional scenes is nearly strong enough to make me forget about the manipulative mawkishness behind them".
