= Fergus Riordan =

Scots-Irish actor

- Born: Fergus James Riordan; 22 July 1997 (age 29); Madrid
- Occupations: Actor; Photographer
- Known for: Ghost Rider: Spirit of Vengeance

Fergus James Riordan is a Scottish/Irish actor and photographer, best known for his role in Ghost Rider: Spirit of Vengeance as Daniel "Danny" Ketch. He was born in Madrid, and one of his parents is Irish and the other is Scottish.

== Career ==
At the age of 7 he accompanied his mother, her friend, and her friend's son to a casting audition. His acting career started to take form with the part of Richard in Fragile. Later he landed a major role in I Want to Be a Soldier, a supporting role in El sueño de Iván and then a main role in Ghost Rider: Spirit of Vengeance portraying Daniel "Danny" Ketch, a teenage boy who is the son of the devil.

== Personal life ==
Riordan studied photography at Leeds Arts University. He has a brother, Thomas.

== Filmography ==
=== Films ===
Year	Title	Role	Notes
2005	Fragile	Richard	
2010	I Want to Be a Soldier	Alex	
2010	El Paraísao		Short film
2011	El Sueño de Iván	Morenilla	
2011	Ghost Rider: Spirit of Vengeance	Daniel "Danny" Ketch	
2015	Don't Grow Up	Bastian	

=== Television ===
Year	Title	Role	Notes
2011	Cinema Days	Himself	1 episode
2010–2011	Cinema 3	Himself	2 episodes
