= Christian Molina (director) =

Spanish director, producer, writer and actor

- Born: 1979 (age 46–47); Barcelona
- Citizenship: Spain
- Occupations: director, producer, writer
- Years active: 1994–present

Christian Molina is a Spanish director, producer, writer and actor. He raised to popularity by the 2008 Spanish erotic drama Diario de una Ninfómana—better known as Diary of a Sex Addict.

== Early life and training ==
Christian Molina was born in 1979 at Barcelona, Spain. His training as a filmmaker was conducted in both Spanish top film schools, the ECAM in Madrid and ESCAC in Barcelona.

Molina has an extensive professional career and has supplemented his training in dozens of movies including "Airbag", "What Women Laugh" and "Memories of Fallen Angel" in which he has participated as a Focus Puller and operator, giving him broad experience in the use of image and light. Molina has worked with leading directors of photography, such as Fernando Arribas, José Luis Alcaine and Paco Femenía.

== Career ==
In 2004 he directed his first feature film, "Red Blood", narrated a story of losers swiftly and surprisingly reminiscent of the Spanish horror film of the 1970s. In 2006 and 2007 participating as associate producer on the films "Triumph" and "Chuecatown".

In 2008, Christian Molina faces his second challenge as director, Diary of a Nymphomaniac, producing higher economic level and based on the acclaimed best-selling novel by Valérie Tasso, played by actors of the caliber of Belén Fabra, Leonardo Sbaraglia, Geraldine Chaplin, Ángela Molina and Llum Barrera. This film tells the story of Val, a young attractive and intellectual curiosity about sex which will turn it into their lifestyle.

In 2009, his next film. L'Estacio de l'oblit (Station of the Forgotten), was co-directed with Sandra Serna, starring Nilo Mur, and Fermí Reixach Katia Klein, among others. The film is centered on the generation gap between an old sailor (Domingo) and a teenager (Pau).

In 2010, Molina received Marc'Aurelio Alice Nella Citta Under 12 Award for his movie I Want to Be a Soldier at International Rome Film Festival held at the Auditorium Parco Della Musica in Rome, Italy.

In 2011, he made a short movie – Intereses Mundanos Bar Mut. It is about four independent situations of life that by chance come together the same night in the same restaurant, four stories seen from the perspective of the restaurant's soul.

== Filmography ==
In Camera & Electrical Department

Title	Role	Year
Cásate conmigo, Maribel	(second assistant camera)	2002
¡Ja me maaten...!	(second assistant camera)	2000
Camino de Santiago	(assistant camera)	1999
Memorias del ángel caído (TV mini-series)	(first assistant camera)	1998
La duquesa roja	(assistant camera)	1997
Airbag	(first assistant camera:second unit, second assistant camera)	1997
¿De qué se ríen las mujeres?	(second assistant camera)	1997
Como un relámpago		1996
Gimlet	(first assistant camera)	1995
Tiempos mejores	(second assistant camera)	1994

As a director

Title	Year
Intereses Mundanos Bar Mut	2011
I Want to Be a Soldier	2010
Station of the Forgotten	2009
Diary of a Nymphomaniac	2008
Rojo sangre	2004

As a producer or associate producer

Title	Year
11 – 11 – 11	2011
Boys town	2007
El triunfo	2006
