= Belén Fabra =

Spanish actress

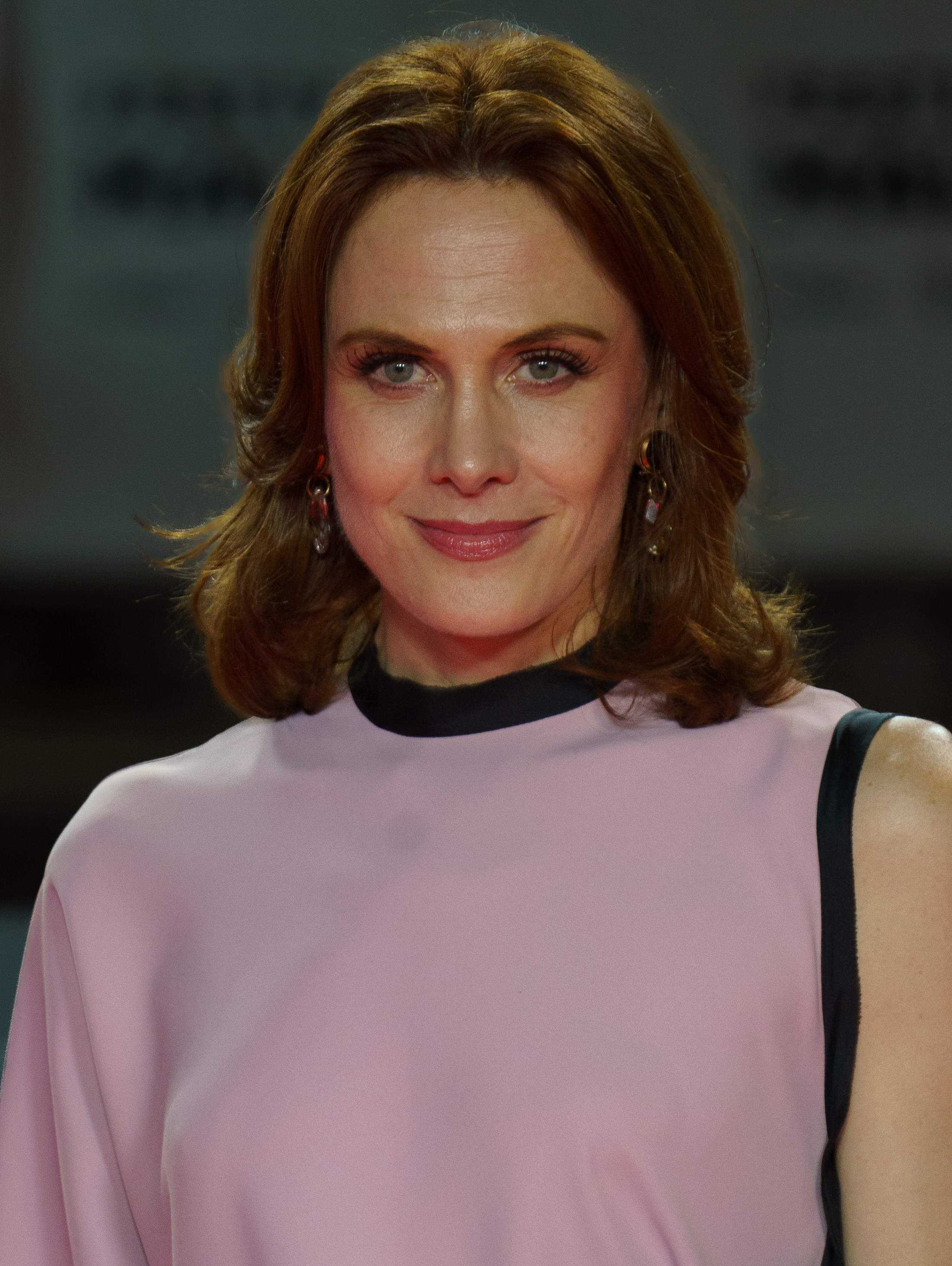
- Fabra in 2025
- Born: Belén Fabra Homedes; 3 November 1977 (age 48); Tortosa, Spain
- Occupation: Actress

Belén Fabra Homedes (born 3 November 1977) is a Spanish actress from Catalonia.

== Life and career ==
Belén Fabra Homedes was born on 3 November 1977 in Tortosa, Catalonia. She started by playing small roles in numerous theater plays, films and television series.

She made her breakthrough with the 2007 play Plataforma, for which she was nominated for the Max Awards and the Valle-Inclán de Teatro Award.

Fabra first came to prominence in the cinema with the 2007 film Canciones de amor en Lolita's Club, directed by Vicente Aranda.

She was nominated for the Gaudí Award for Best Performance by an Actress in a Leading Role for her role in the 2008 erotic film Diario de una ninfómana. She is currently working in two films, Flores negras and L'estació de l'oblit.

== Personal life ==
Fabra is fluent in Catalan, Spanish and English and she can speak Italian.

== Filmography ==
=== Film ===
- L'estratègia del cucut (2001) (TV)
- El lado oscuro del corazón 2 (2001)
- Carles, príncep de Viana (2001) (TV)
- Joc de mentides (2003) (TV)
- Mai storie d'amore in cucina (2004) (TV)
- Pactar amb el gat (2007)
- Canciones de amor en Lolita's Club (2007)
- Diario de una Ninfómana (2008)
- Flores negras (2009)
- L'estació de l'oblit (2009)
- Voces (2020)

=== Television ===
- Majoria absoluta (2002)
- Pepe Carvalho (2003)
- Hospital Central (2006)
- Planta 25 (2007)
- Positus (2007)
- Zoo (2008)
- Imperium (2012)
- Origin (2018)

=== Theater ===
- Què de què (l'actualitat a escena) (2001)
- Migracions.es (2003)
- Happy Hour (2005)
- La fam (2006)
- Tirant lo Blanc (2007)
- Plataforma (2007)
- Jugar amb un tigre (2008)

== Awards and nominations ==
- Gaudí Awards
  - 2008: Best Performance by an Actress in a Leading Role (Diario de una ninfómana) — Nominated
- Premios Max de las artes escénicas
  - 2007: Best Featured Actress in a Play (Plataforma) — Nominated
- Premios Valle-Inclán
  - 2007: Best Actress in a Supporting Role (Plataforma) — Nominated
