= Insatiable (novel) =

2003 novel by Valérie Tasso

- First edition (Spanish)
- Author: Valérie Tasso
- Original title: Diario de una ninfómana
- Translator: Nick Caistor
- Language: Spanish
- Genre: Memoir
- Publisher: Plaza & Janés
- Publication date: 2003
- Publication place: Spain
- Media type: Print (Hardback & Paperback)
- Pages: 397 pp

Insatiable is a 2003 autobiographical novel from French PR worker Valérie Tasso.

== Plot summary ==
The book begins with her as a confident and sexually adventurous senior PR worker. On a business trip to Peru she decides to have sex with a fat and unattractive man. After she loses her job and is deceived and robbed of her savings by her Spanish boyfriend Jaime, she decides to become a call-girl to pay off her debts. The book then deals with the internal politics of the brothel, the other girls and the various clients. Tasso finds the experience an interesting one, despite a few scrapes, unpleasantness of some of the other girls and ruthlessness of the manager, Manolo.

Having made the sum of money she set out to make, she falls in love with a client, Giovanni, and decides to leave the business. Ultimately her relationship with Giovanni does not last.
