= Picassent =

- Municipality
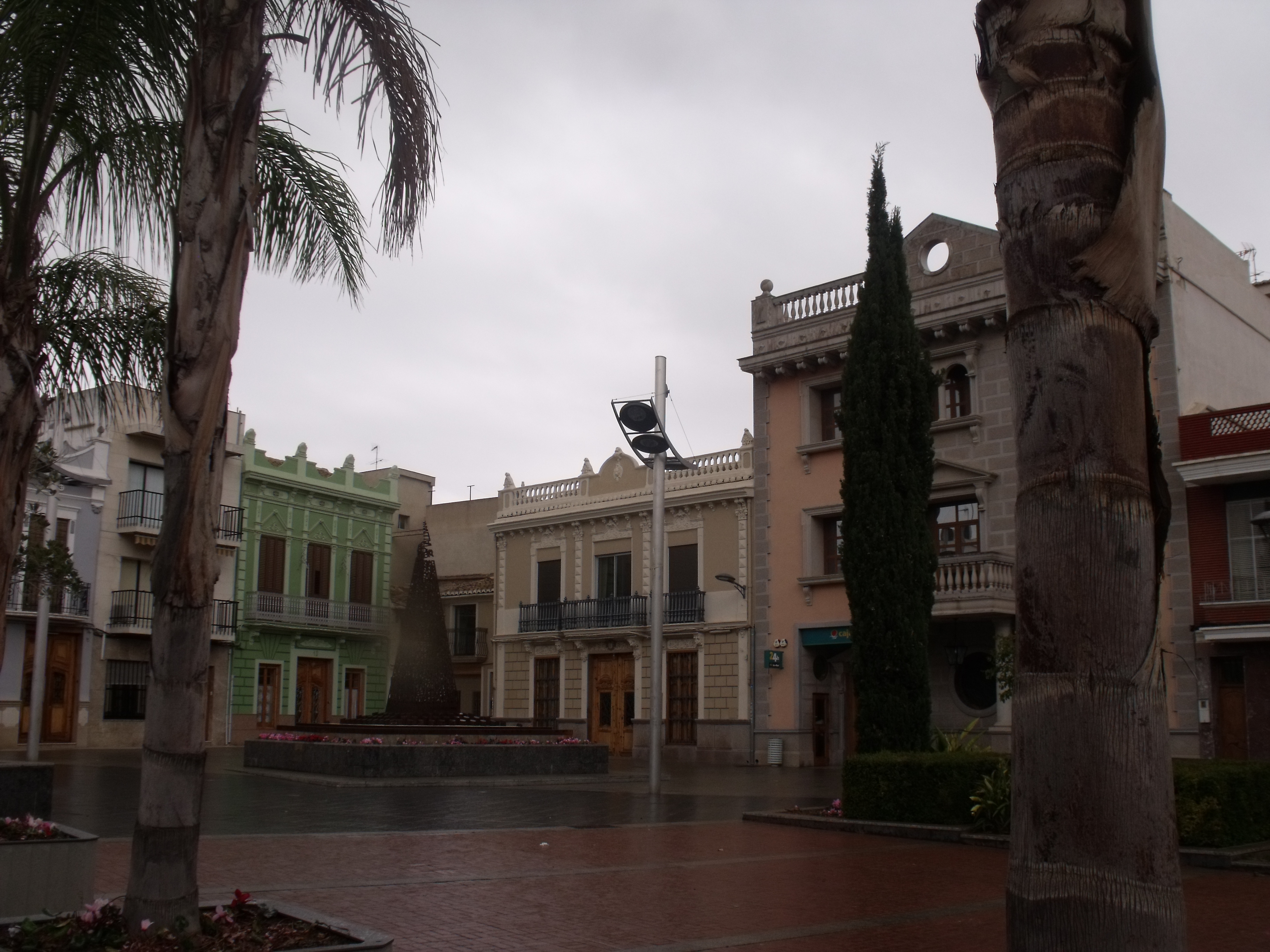

- Coat of arms

- Location in Spain
- Coordinates: 39°21′40″N 0°27′36″W
- Country: Spain
- Autonomous community: Valencian Community
- Province: Valencia
- Comarca: Horta Sud
- Judicial district: Picassent

Government
  - Mayoress: María Concepción García Ferrer (2003) (PSOE)

Area
  - Total: 85.78 km^{2} (33.12 sq mi)
- Elevation: 50 m (160 ft)

Population (2025-01-01)
  - Total: 23,202
  - Density: 270.5/km^{2} (700.5/sq mi)
- Demonym(s): Picassentí, picassentina
- Time zone: UTC+1 (CET)
  - Summer (DST): UTC+2 (CEST)
- Postal code: 46220
- Official language(s): Valencian
- Website: Official website

Picassent (Valencian pronunciation: [pikaˈsent]) is a municipality in the comarca of Horta Sud in the Valencian Community, Spain.

Picassent is a town of close to twenty thousand people. Originally the town's main economic activity was agriculture, however during the last twenty years Picassent developed two industrial areas adjacent to the city centre. The excellent communications and its distance to the main City of Valencia have converted Picassent in an ideal and cheaper location for the city workers that commute every day.

In the surrounding countryside, one of the largest of the county (comarca), the locals grow orange trees.

The municipality is composed by several neighbourhoods, some more formal than others. Traditionally these neighbourhoods were attached to the three Churches sited next to three main town squares: "San Cristobal" next to the townhall square, "Milagrosa" next to the Market square and "l´hermita de la Vallivana" next to "l'hermita" square.

The town celebrates two main festivals a year, one on 10 July in honour of "San Cristobal" and another on 8 September in honour to "Virgen de la Vallivana". During the July festival there is a week of "bous al carrer", a version of the well known "San Fermin" in Pamplona. Also in September the main day (the 8th) is surrounded by a week of multiple activities: from religious processions to classic and rock music concerts and fireworks.

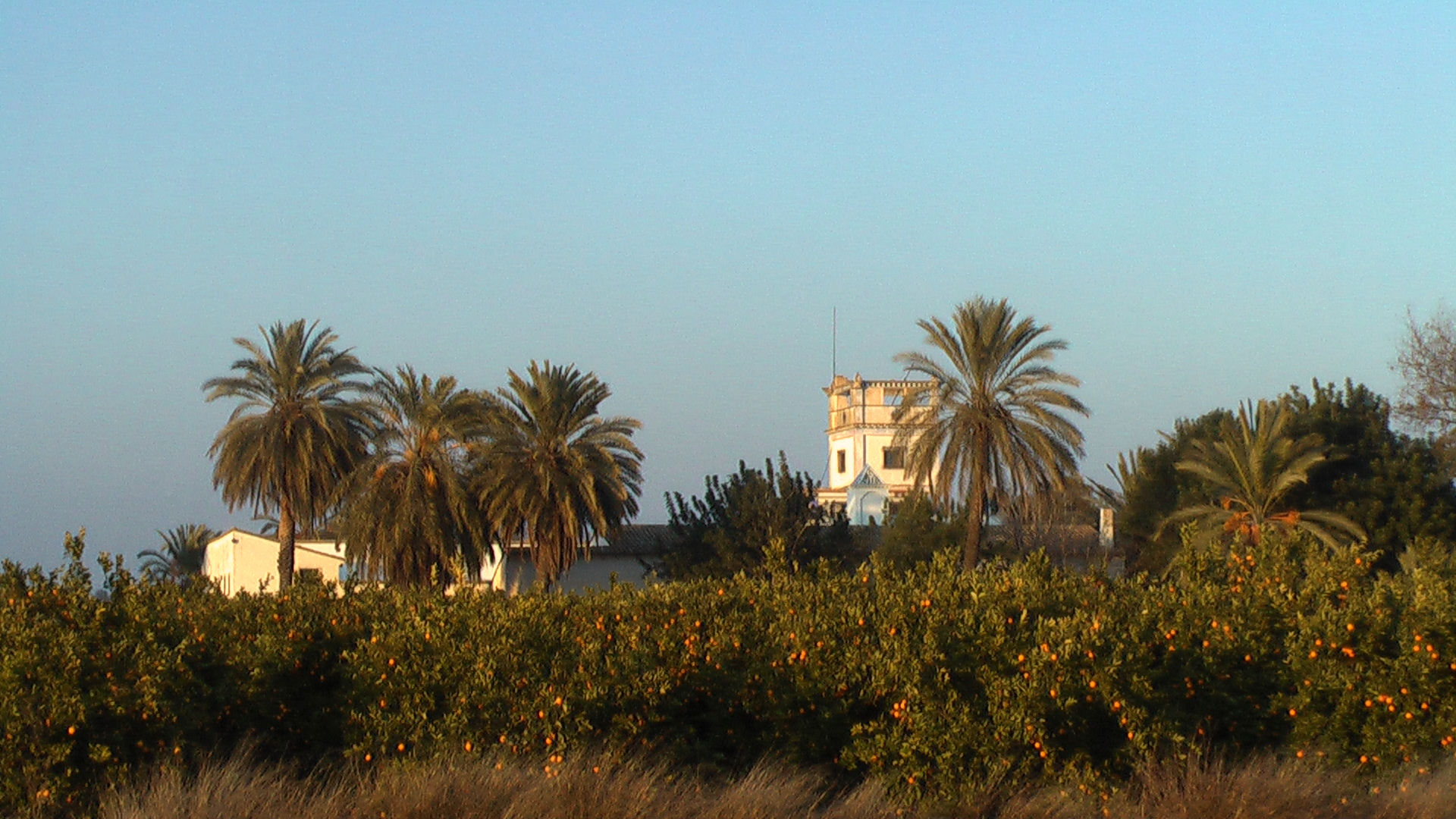
Villa behind orange and palm trees

Picassent has an Underground station (Line 1) whose name is "Picassent". This connects the city centre of the municipality with the capital València. It takes half an hour more or less going from Picassent to Valencia city centre.

It hosts the two main prisons of Valencia.

== History ==
The village origins are old. Antiques have been found from the Bronze Age. It got the entitlement of 'village' in 1324, and on 22 October 1364 it came under the control of Pere Boil Colom. Its population in 1510 was less than 400 people, around 100 families, which got halved with the expulsion of the Muslims and the general crisis in 1646 with the loss of some settlements like Ninyerola and Espioca. It didn't recover until the year 1713 when it reached 100 families again and has continued growing until now.

The older area is known as the "Carrerons" (meaning long streets in the local language).

The village kept its original walls until 1820.

Some remaining historic building are

- The Sant Cristofol church which was built over an older building between the years 1712 and 1755.
- The Espioca tower, which was built by Muslims in the 11th century and was used as a defensive point for Valencia. It has four floors and it is located near the highway A-7/AP-7.

== See also ==
- List of municipalities in Valencia
