= Minglanilla, Cuenca =

Minglanilla, Spain
- municipality
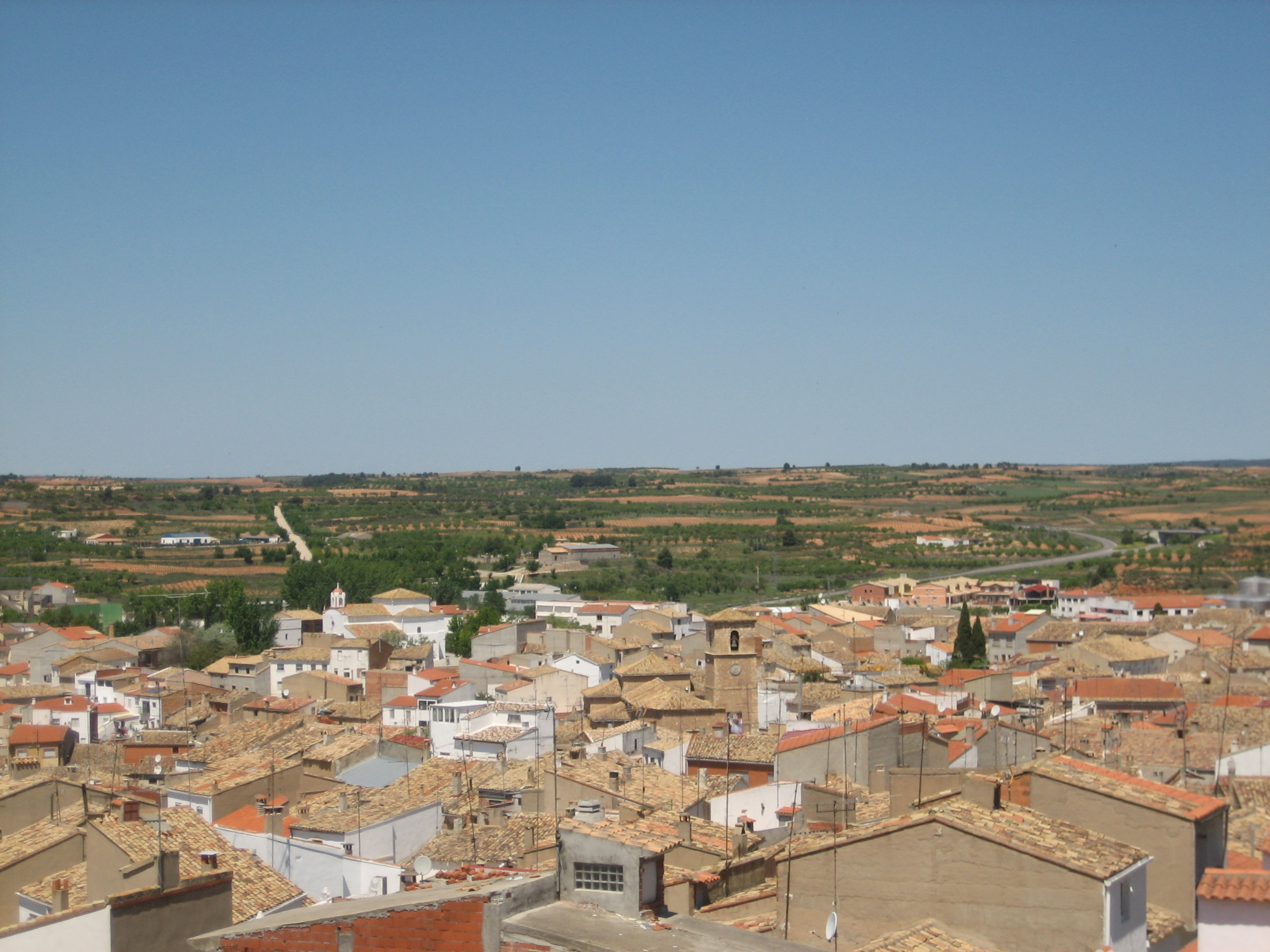
- View of Minglanilla from the castle

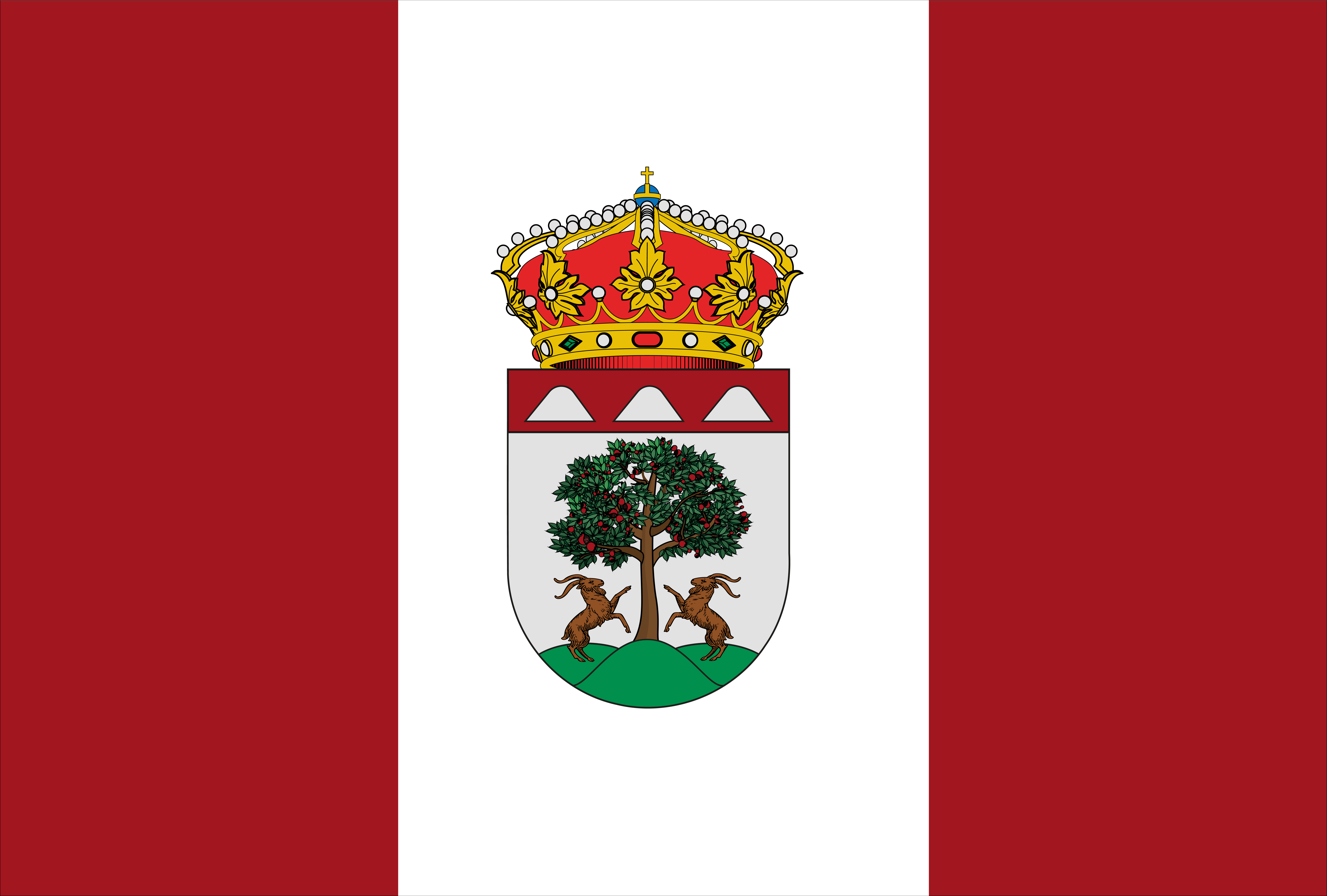
- Flag Coat of arms

- Location within Spain Location within Castilla-La Mancha
- Country: Spain
- Autonomous community: Castile-La Mancha
- Province: Cuenca
- Municipality: Minglanilla

Area
  - Total: 109.64 km^{2} (42.33 sq mi)
- Elevation: 827 m (2,713 ft)

Population (2025-01-01)
  - Total: 2,388
  - Density: 21.78/km^{2} (56.41/sq mi)
- Time zone: UTC+1 (CET)
  - Summer (DST): UTC+2 (CEST)

Minglanilla is a municipality located in the province of Cuenca, Castile-La Mancha, Spain. According to the 2006 census (INE), the municipality had a population of 2,532 inhabitants.

== Name ==
Its name derives from a pomegranate tree (minglano) that grew near a spring. However, popular tradition tells a romantic legend about a beautiful young woman named Minga, nicknamed La Galanilla, who was courted by several wealthy magnates, and from this, according to the legend, the town took its name, La Minglanilla.

== History ==
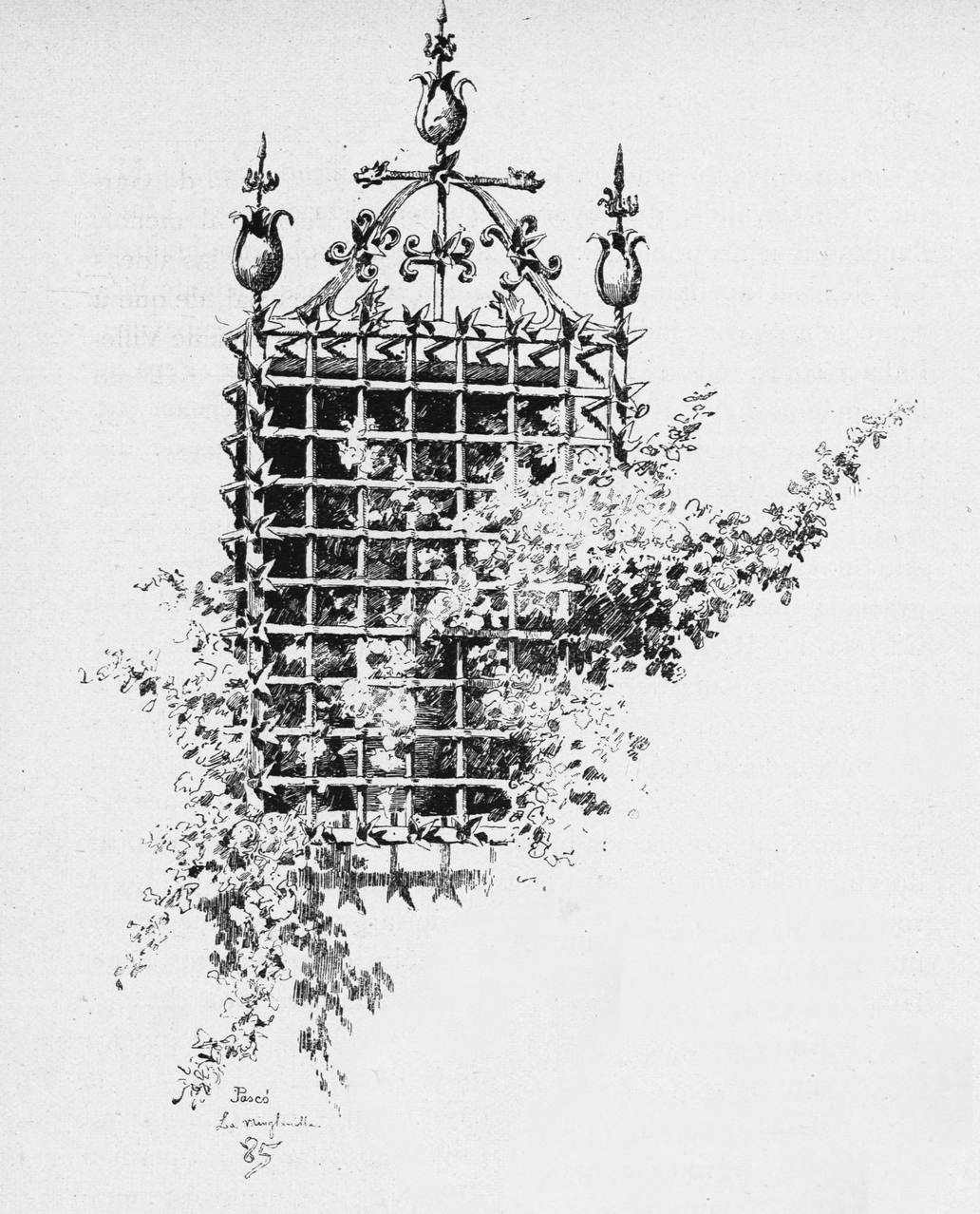
Window with a grille in Minglanilla in a drawing by Josep Pascó (1885)

The current urban center of Minglanilla was created in 1505 and belonged to Iniesta until it was granted the title of town in 1564.

In the 19th century, the salt mines that bore the town's name were very famous and constituted the town's main source of wealth. There was also a flour mill on the Cabriel River and four presses for oil extraction, soap making, and some industries producing coarse linen and rugs. In 1848, the town had 495 households, totaling 1,498 inhabitants. That same year, Father Fernando Sánchez, a native of Minglanilla, founded the town of Minglanilla on the Philippine island of Cebu. (Note: This town had a population of 155,934 inhabitants in 2024.)

The town appears under the name "Minglanillas" in the Spanish film El astronauta (1970). In 2009, Minglanilla was crowned champion in the grand final of the summer Grand Prix, presented by Ramón García.

== Sources ==
- Madoz, Pascual (1848). "Minglanilla". Diccionario geográfico-estadístico-histórico de España y sus posesiones de Ultramar. Vol. XI. Madrid: Establecimiento tipográfico de P. Madoz y L. Sagasti.
