= 68th CEC Awards =

Spanish film awards

- Date: 11 February 2013
- Site: Cine Palafox, Madrid, Spain
- Hosted by: Xenia Tostado; Jesús Olmedo
- Organized by: Círculo de Escritores Cinematográficos

Highlights
- Most awards: Snow White (8)
- Most nominations: Snow White (12)

The 68th CEC Medals ceremony, presented by the Círculo de Escritores Cinematográficos, took place on 11 February 2013 at the Cine Palafox in Madrid. The gala was hosted by Xenia Tostado and Jesús Olmedo.

== Winners and nominees ==
The winners and nominees are listed as follows:

Best Film: Snow White; The Impossible; The Artist and the Model; Unit 7	Best Animation Film: Tad, The Lost Explorer; Wrinkles; The Apostle; Daddy, I'm a Zombie
Best Director: Pablo Berger – Snow White; J.A. Bayona – The Impossible; Fernando Trueba – The Artist and the Model; Alberto Rodríguez – Unit 7	Best New Director: Enrique Gato – Tad, The Lost Explorer; Alfonso Sánchez – The World Is Ours; Isabel de Ocampo – Evelyn; Paco León – Carmina or Blow Up; Oriol Paulo – The Body; Ana Rodríguez Rosell – Buscando a Eimish
Best Original Screenplay: Pablo Berger – Snow White; Alberto Rodríguez, Rafael Cobos – Unit 7; Fernando Trueba, Jean-Claude Carrière – The Artist and the Model; Sergio G. Sánchez – The Impossible	Best Adapted Screenplay: Javier Barreira, Gorka Magallón, Ignacio del Moral, Jordi Gasull, Neil Landau – Tad, The Lost Explorer; Javier Gullón, Jorge Arenillas – Invader; Nicolás Saad – Frozen Silence; Jorge Guerricaechevarría, Sergio G. Sánchez – The End
Best Actor: Antonio de la Torre – Unit 7; Luis Tosar – Operation E; Jean Rochefort – The Artist and the Model; Daniel Giménez Cacho – Snow White; José Sacristán – Madrid, 1987	Best Actress: Naomi Watts – The Impossible; Maribel Verdú – Snow White; Aida Folch – The Artist and the Model; Verónica Echegui – Kathmandu Lullaby
Best Supporting Actor: Julián Villagrán – Unit 7; Josep Maria Pou – Snow White; Antonio de la Torre – Invader; Javier Cámara – A Gun in Each Hand	Best Supporting Actress: Ángela Molina – Snow White; Candela Peña – A Gun in Each Hand; Chus Lampreave – The Artist and the Model; María León – Carmina or Blow Up
Best New Actor: Joaquín Núñez – Unit 7; Tom Holland – The Impossible; Emilio Gavira – Snow White; Àlex Monner – The Wild Ones	Best New Actress: Macarena García – Snow White; Carmina Barrios – Carmina or Blow Up; Cati Solivellas – The Wild Ones; Estefanía de los Santos – Unit 7
Best Cinematography: Kiko de la Rica – Snow White; Óscar Faura – The Impossible; Álex Catalán – Unit 7; Daniel Vilar – The Artist and the Model	Best Editing: Fernando Franco – Snow White; Bernat Villaplana, Elena Ruiz – The Impossible; José M. G. Moyano – Unit 7; Antonio Frutos, David Pinillos – Invader
Best Music: Alfonso de Vilallonga – Snow White; Fernando Velázquez – The Impossible; Julio de la Rosa – Unit 7; Àlex Martínez, Zacarías M. de la Riva – Tad, the Lost Explorer; Antonio Escobar – Buscando a Eimish	Best Documentary Film: Sons of the Clouds; Contra el tiempo; Las constituyentes; Testigo involuntario
Best Foreign Film: Argo; In the House; The Intouchables; Under the Hawthorn Tree; Hugo

== Special awards ==
- Honorary Medal: José Sazatornil, Saza
- Medal for the Literary Merit and Journalistic Merit: Antonio Carballo
- Medal for the Promotion and Media Merit: Wanda Visión
