= List of Spanish films of 2012 =

A list of Spanish-produced and co-produced feature films released in 2012 in Spain. The domestic theatrical release date is favoured.

== Films ==
Release		Title (Domestic title)	Cast & Crew	Distribution label	Ref.
J A N U A R Y	13	As Luck Would Have It (La chispa de la vida)	Director: Álex de la Iglesia Cast: José Mota, Salma Hayek, Juan Luis Galiardo, Blanca Portillo, Fernando Tejero, Carolina Bang, Joaquín Climent, Eduardo Casanova, Santiago Segura, Manuel Tallafé, Juanjo Puigcorbé, Antonio Garrido	Alta Classics	
J A N U A R Y	20	Frozen Silence (Silencio en la nieve)	Director: Gerardo Herrero Cast: Juan Diego Botto, Carmelo Gómez, Víctor Clavijo, Francesc Orella, Andrés Gertrúdix, Sergi Calleja	Alta Classics	
J A N U A R Y	27	The Monk (El monje)	Director: Dominik Moll Cast: Vincent Cassel, Sergi López, Jordi Dauder, Déborah François	Vértice 360	(Note: Co-production Spain–France (33%–67%).)
F E B R U A R Y	3	Kathmandu Lullaby (Kathmandu, un espejo en el cielo)	Director: Icíar Bollaín Cast: Verónica Echegui, Saumyata Bhattarai, Norbu Tsering Gurun	Alta Classics	
F E B R U A R Y	3	Ghost Graduation (Promoción fantasma)	Director: Javier Ruiz Caldera Cast: Raúl Arévalo, Alexandra Jiménez, Andrea Duro, Jaime Olías, Joaquín Reyes, Carlos Areces, Aura Garrido	Hispano Foxfilm	
F E B R U A R Y	10	Dark Impulse (Lo mejor de Eva)	Director: Mariano Barroso Cast: Leonor Watling, Miguel Ángel Silvestre, Nathalie Poza, Adriana Ugarte, Helio Pedregal, Josean Bengoetxea	Tripictures	
M A R C H	2	Red Lights	Director: Rodrigo Cortés Cast: Cillian Murphy, Sigourney Weaver, Robert de Niro	Warner Bros. Pictures	(Note: Co-production Spain–United States (90%–10%).)
M A R C H	9	Chrysalis (De tu ventana a la mía)	Director: Paula Ortiz Cast: Maribel Verdú, Leticia Dolera, Luisa Gavasa, Roberto Álamo, Fran Perea, Pablo Rivero, Cristina Rota, Carlos Álvarez-Nóvoa, María José Moreno, Luis Bermejo, Julián Villagrán, Álex Angulo	Alta Classics	
M A R C H	9	Childish Games (Dictado)	Director: Antonio Chavarrías Cast: Juan Diego Botto, Bárbara Lennie, Mágica Pérez	Filmax	
M A R C H	16	La montaña rusa	Director: Emilio Martínez-Lázaro Cast: Verónica Sánchez, Ernesto Alterio, Alberto San Juan	Alta Classics	
M A R C H	30	Rec 3: Genesis (Rec 3: Génesis)	Director: Paco Plaza Cast: Leticia Dolera, Diego Martín, Àlex Monner, Ismael Martínez, Emilio Mencheta, Mireia Ros, Javier Botet	Filmax	
A P R I L	4	Unit 7 (Grupo 7)	Director: Alberto Rodríguez Cast: Antonio de la Torre, Mario Casas, Joaquín Núñez, José Manuel Poga, Inma Cuesta, Estefanía de los Santos, Alfonso Sánchez, Carlos Olalla, Lucía Guerrero, Julián Villagrán	Warner Bros. Pictures	
A P R I L	4	The Cold Light of Day (La fría luz del día)	Director: Mabrouk El Mechri Cast: Henry Cavill, Sigourney Weaver, Bruce Willis, Verónica Echegui	Aurum	
A P R I L	13	Madrid, 1987	Director: David Trueba Cast: José Sacristán, María Valverde	—N/a	
A P R I L	27	Winning Streak (The Pelayos)	Director: Eduard Cortés Cast: Daniel Brühl, Lluís Homar, Miguel Ángel Silvestre, Eduard Fernández, Blanca Suárez	Sony Pictures	
M A Y	4	Angels of Sex (El sexo de los ángeles)	Director: Xavier Villaverde Cast: Astrid Bergès-Frisbey, Álvaro Cervantes, Llorenç González	Alta Classics	
M A Y	4	Farewell, My Queen (Adiós a la reina)	Director: Benoit Jacquot Cast: Diane Kruger, Virginie Ledoyen, Xavier Beauvois, Léa Seydoux	Karma Films	
M A Y	11	Six Points About Emma (Seis puntos sobre Emma)	Director: Roberto Pérez Toledo Cast: Verónica Echegui, Álex García, Fernando Tielve	Alta Classics	
M A Y	18	Sons of the Clouds: The Last Colony (Hijos de las nubes, la última colonia)	Director: Álvaro Longoria	Wanda Visión	
J U N E	1	Orange Honey (Miel de naranjas)	Director: Imanol Uribe Cast: Iban Garate, Blanca Suárez, Karra Elejalde, Eduard Fernández, Carlos Santos, José Manuel Poga, Bárbara Lennie, Ángela Molina, Nora Navas	Alta Classics	
J U N E	1	Offside (En fuera de juego)	Director: David Marqués Cast: Fernando Tejero, Diego Peretti, José Sancho, Hugo Silva, Laura Pamplona, Carolina Peleritti, Patricia Montero	A Contracorriente Films	
J U N E	8	Diamond Flash	Director: Carlos Vermut Cast: Ángela Boix, Miquel Insua, Klaus, Rocío León, Eva Llorach, Victoria Radonic, Ángela Villar	Filmin	
J U N E	22	I Want You (Tengo ganas de ti)	Director: Fernando González Molina Cast: Mario Casas, María Valverde, Clara Lago	Warner Bros. Pictures	
J U N E	22	El mundo es nuestro	Director: Alfonso Sánchez Cast: Alfonso Sánchez, Alberto López	Festival Films	
J U L Y	5	Carmina or Blow Up (Carmina o revienta)	Director: Paco León Cast: Carmina Barrios, Paco Casaus, María León	—N/a	
J U L Y	6	El secreto de los 24 escalones	Director: Santiago Lapeira Cast: Maxi Iglesias, Ona Casamiquela	Flins y Pinículas	
J U L Y	13	Lobos de Arga	Director: Juan Martínez Moreno Cast: Carlos Areces, Gorka Otxoa, Secun de la Rosa, Manuel Manquiña, Mabel Rivera	Vértice 360	
J U L Y	13	White Elephant (Elefante blanco)	Director: Pablo Trapero Cast: Ricardo Darín, Martina Gusmán, Jérémie Renier	Alta Classics	
J U L Y	27	Poker Face (Impávido)	Director: Carlos Therón Cast: Julián Villagrán, Marta Torné, Carolina Bona, Manolo Solo, José Luis García Pérez, Víctor Clavijo, Nacho Vidal	Emon	
A U G U S T	24	Manolete	Director: Menno Meyjes Cast: Adrien Brody, Penélope Cruz	Premium Cine	
A U G U S T	31	Tad, The Lost Explorer (Las aventuras de Tadeo Jones)	Director: Enrique Gato	Paramount Pictures	
S E P T E M B E R	7	Everybody Has a Plan (Todos tenemos un plan)	Director: Ana Piterbarg Cast: Viggo Mortensen, Soledad Villamil, Daniel Fanego, Javier Godino, Sofía Gala	Hispano Foxfilm	(Note: Co-production Spain–Argentina–Germany (60%–30%–10%).)
S E P T E M B E R	7	Holmes & Watson. Madrid Days	Director: José Luis Garci Cast: Gary Piquer, José Luis García Pérez, Belén López, Víctor Clavijo, Enrique Villén, Manuela Velasco, Macarena Gómez	Alta Classics	
S E P T E M B E R	28	Snow White (Blancanieves)	Director: Pablo Berger Cast: Maribel Verdú, Daniel Giménez Cacho, Pere Ponce, José María Pou, Inma Cuesta, Ángela Molina, Sofía Oria, Macarena García	Wanda Visión	
S E P T E M B E R	28	The Artist and the Model (El artista y la modelo)	Director: Fernando Trueba Cast: Jean Rochefort, Aida Folch, Claudia Cardinale, Chus Lampreave, Götz Otto, Christian Sinniger	Alta Classics	
O C T O B E R	11	The Impossible (Lo imposible)	Director: J.A. Bayona Cast: Naomi Watts, Ewan McGregor, Tom Holland	Warner Bros. Pictures	
O C T O B E R	19	Hold-Up! (¡Atraco!)	Director: Eduard Cortés Cast: Guillermo Francella, Óscar Jaenada, Amaia Salamanca, Nicolás Cabré	Filmax	
N O V E M B E R	9	All Is Silence (Todo es silencio)	Director: José Luis Cuerda Cast: Miguel Ángel Silvestre, Quim Gutiérrez, Celia Freijeiro, Juan Diego	Filmax	
N O V E M B E R	23	The End (Fin)	Director: Jorge Torregrossa Cast: Maribel Verdú, Daniel Grao, Carmen Ruiz, Miquel Fernández, Blanca Romero, Antonio Garrido, Clara Lago, Andrés Velencoso	Sony Pictures	
N O V E M B E R	30	Invader (Invasor)	Director: Daniel Calparsoro Cast: Alberto Ammann, Antonio de la Torre, Karra Elejalde, Inma Cuesta	Buena Vista International	
D E C E M B E R	5	A Gun in Each Hand (Una pistola en cada mano)	Director: Cesc Gay Cast: Javier Cámara, Ricardo Darín, Eduard Fernández, Cayetana Guillén Cuervo, Jordi Mollà, Eduardo Noriega, Candela Peña, Alberto San Juan, Leonardo Sbaraglia, Clara Segura, Luis Tosar, Leonor Watling	Filmax	
D E C E M B E R	21	The Body (El cuerpo)	Director: Oriol Paulo Cast: Belén Rueda, José Coronado, Hugo Silva, Aura Garrido	Sony Pictures	

== Box office ==
The ten highest-grossing Spanish films in 2012, by domestic box office gross revenue, are as follows:

Highest-grossing films of 2012
Rank	Title	Distributor	Admissions	Domestic gross (€)
1	The Impossible (Lo imposible)	Warner Bros. Pictures	5,914,601	41,009,378.41
2	Tad, The Lost Explorer (Las aventuras de Tadeo Jones)	Paramount Pictures	2,720,152	18,016,633.93
3	I Want You (Tengo ganas de ti)	Warner Bros. Pictures	1,980,358	12,122,051.24
4	Wrath of the Titans (Ira de titanes)	Warner Bros. Pictures	837,056	5,938,002.88
5	Red Lights (Luces rojas)	Warner Bros. Pictures	466,868	3,012,861.08
6	The Body (El cuerpo)	Sony Pictures	416,848	2,964,834.16
7	Unit 7 (Grupo 7)	Warner Bros. Pictures	374,533	2,392,973.18
8	Rec 3: Genesis ([•REC]³: Génesis)	Filmax	369,935	2,341,730.87
9	Ghost Graduation (Promoción fantasma)	Hispano Foxfilm	274,519	1,717,203.24
10	Kathmandu Lullaby (Katmandú, un espejo en el cielo)	Alta Classics	246,674	1,537,100.53

== See also ==
- 27th Goya Awards
