= List of accolades received by The Impossible =

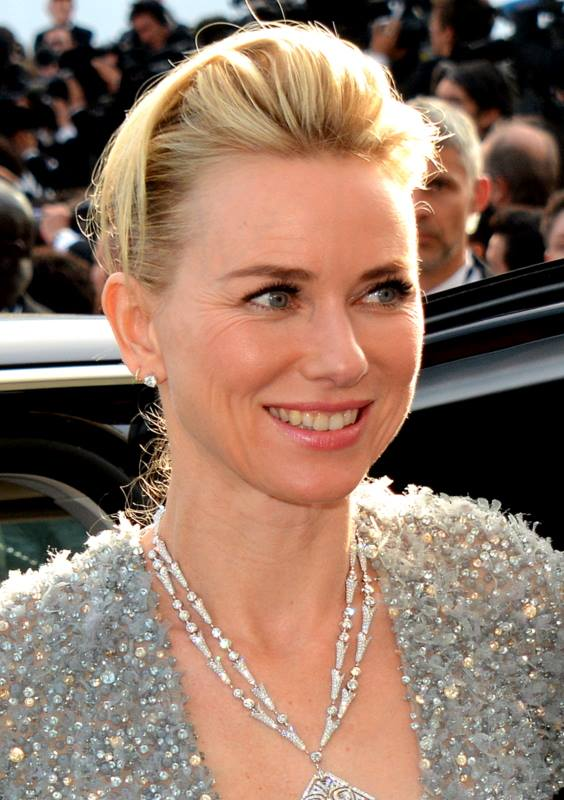
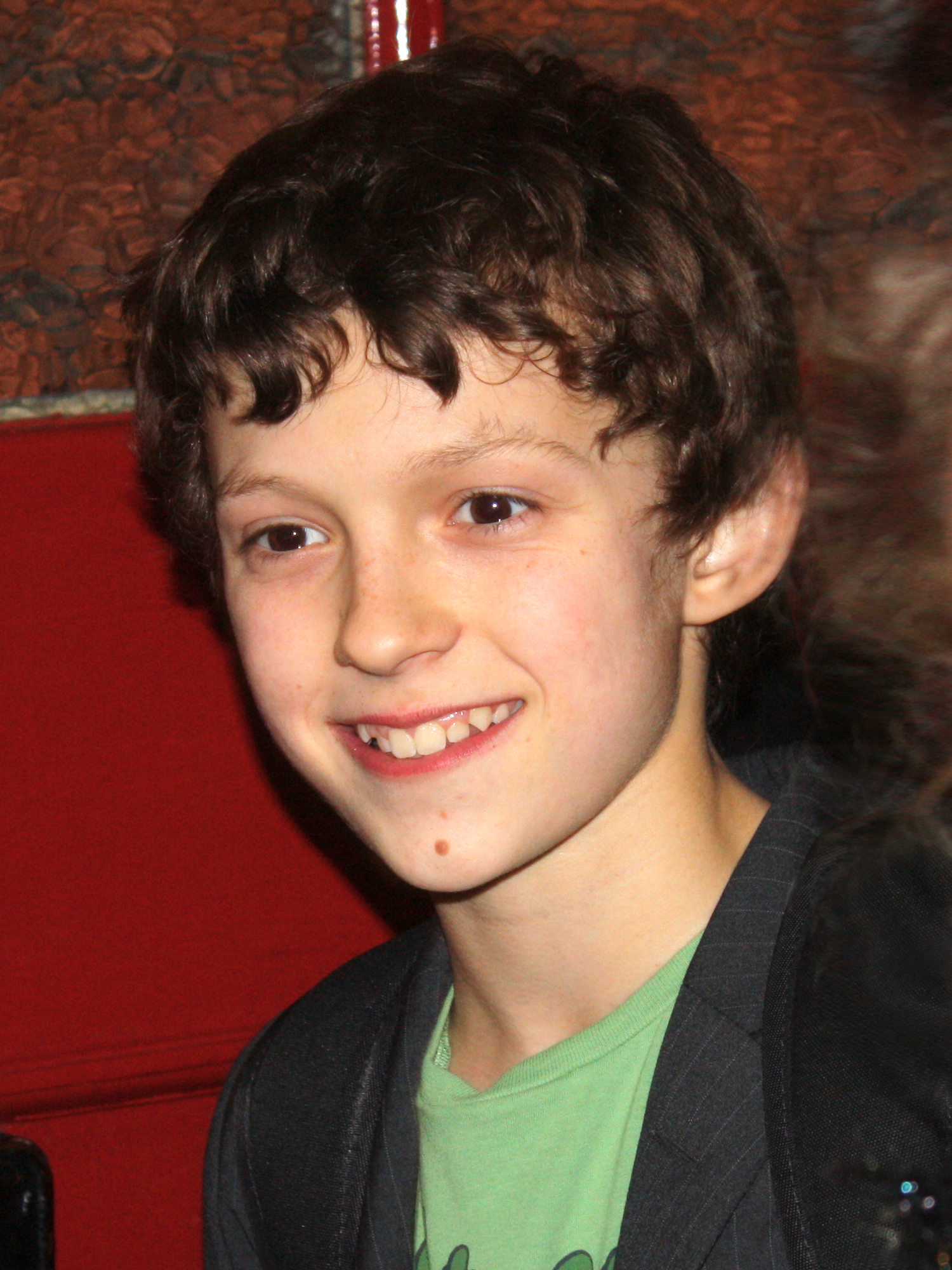
- Naomi Watts (left) and Tom Holland (right) were praised for their performances in the film, garnering many awards and nominations
Accolades
Award	Won	Nominated
Academy Awards	0	1
Golden Globe Awards	0	1
Goya Awards	5	14
- Total number of awards and nominations
Totals	24	67
- References

The Impossible (Spanish: Lo Imposible) is a 2012 English-language Spanish disaster drama directed by Juan Antonio Bayona and written by Sergio G. Sánchez. It is based on the experience of María Belón and her family in the 2004 Indian Ocean tsunami. The cast includes Naomi Watts, Ewan McGregor, and Tom Holland.

The film received positive reviews from critics for its direction and its acting, especially for Watts who was nominated for the Academy Award for Best Actress, the Golden Globe Award for Best Actress – Motion Picture Drama, and a Screen Actors Guild Award for Outstanding Performance by a Female Actor in a Leading Role.

== Accolades ==
Awards
Award	Category	Recipients	Outcome
Academy Awards	Best Actress	Naomi Watts	Nominated
AACTA Awards	Best International Actress	Naomi Watts	Nominated
Art Directors Guild	Best Excellence in Production Design for a Contemporary Film	Eugenio Caballero	Nominated
Broadcast Film Critics Association Awards	Best Actress	Naomi Watts	Nominated
Broadcast Film Critics Association Awards	Best Young Actor	Tom Holland	Nominated
Capri Awards	Capri Director Award	Juan Antonio Bayona	Won
Capri Awards	Capri European Director Award	Juan Antonio Bayona	Won
Chicago Film Critics Association Awards	Best Actress	Naomi Watts	Nominated
Chicago Film Critics Association Awards	Most Promising Performer	Tom Holland	Nominated
CEC Medals	Best Picture	The Impossible	Nominated
CEC Medals	Best Actress	Naomi Watts	Won
CEC Medals	Best New Actor	Tom Holland	Nominated
CEC Medals	Best Director	Juan Antonio Bayona	Nominated
CEC Medals	Best Original Screenplay	Sergio G. Sánchez	Nominated
CEC Medals	Best Cinematography	Óscar Faura	Nominated
CEC Medals	Best Editing	Bernat Vilaplana, Elena Ruiz	Nominated
Columbus Film Critics Association Awards	Best Actress	Naomi Watts	Nominated
Dallas-Fort Worth Film Critics Association Awards	Best Actress	Naomi Watts	Nominated
Detroit Film Critics Society	Best Film	The Impossible	Nominated
Detroit Film Critics Society	Best Director	Juan Antonio Bayona	Nominated
Detroit Film Critics Society	Best Actress	Naomi Watts	Nominated
Detroit Film Critics Society	Best Supporting Actor	Ewan McGregor	Nominated
Empire Awards	Empire Award for Best Newcomer	Tom Holland	Won
Empire Awards	Empire Award for Best Actress	Naomi Watts	Nominated
Gaudí Awards	Best Director	Juan Antonio Bayona	Won
Gaudí Awards	Best Editing	Elena Ruiz and Bernart Vilaplana	Won
Gaudí Awards	Best Cinematography	Óscar Faura	Won
Gaudí Awards	Best Sound	Oriol Tarragó and Marc Orts	Won
Gaudí Awards	Best Hair/Make-up	David Martí and Montse Ribé	Won
Gaudí Awards	Best European Film	The Impossible	Won
Golden Globe Awards	Best Actress – Motion Picture Drama	Naomi Watts	Nominated
Goya Awards	Best Film	The Impossible	Nominated
Goya Awards	Best Director	Juan Antonio Bayona	Won
Goya Awards	Best Actress	Naomi Watts	Nominated
Goya Awards	Best Supporting Actor	Ewan McGregor	Nominated
Goya Awards	Best New Actor	Tom Holland	Nominated
Goya Awards	Best Original Screenplay	Sergio G. Sánchez and María Belón	Nominated
Goya Awards	Best Cinematography	Óscar Faura	Nominated
Goya Awards	Best Editing	Elena Ruiz and Bernat Villaplana	Won
Goya Awards	Best Art Direction	Eugenio Caballero	Nominated
Goya Awards	Best Production Supervision	Sandra Hermida Muñiz	Won
Goya Awards	Best Sound	Peter Glossop, Marc Orts and Oriol Tarragó	Won
Goya Awards	Best Special Effects	Pau Costa and Félix Bergés	Won
Goya Awards	Best Makeup and Hairstyles	Alessandro Bertolazzi, David Martí and Montse Ribé	Nominated
Goya Awards	Best Original Score	Fernando Velázquez	Nominated
Hollywood Film Festival	Spotlight Award	Tom Holland	Won
Houston Film Critics Society	Best Actress	Naomi Watts	Nominated
Las Vegas Film Critics Society	Sierra Award for Best Picture	The Impossible	Nominated
London Film Critics Circle Awards	Young British Performer of the Year	Tom Holland	Won
National Board of Review USA	Best Breakthrough Actor	Tom Holland	Won
Palm Springs International Film Festival	Desert Palm Achievement Award	Naomi Watts	Won
Phoenix Film Critics Society	Best Youth Performance in a Lead or Supporting Role – Male	Tom Holland	Won
San Diego Film Critics Society Awards	Best Actress	Naomi Watts	Nominated
Sant Jordi Awards	Best Spanish Film	The Impossible	Won
Saturn Awards	Best Horror or Thriller Film	The Impossible	Nominated
Saturn Awards	Best Actress	Naomi Watts	Nominated
Saturn Awards	Best Young Actor	Tom Holland	Nominated
Saturn Awards	Best Make-up	David Martin, Montse Ribé and Vasit Suchitta	Nominated
Screen Actors Guild Awards	Outstanding Performance by a Female Actor in a Leading Role	Naomi Watts	Nominated
Teen Choice Awards	Choice Movie Drama	The Impossible	Nominated
Teen Choice Awards	Choice Movie Actress Drama	Naomi Watts	Nominated
Visual Effects Society Awards	Outstanding Supporting Visual Effects in a Feature Motion Picture	Pau Costa, Sandra Hermida, Félix Bergés	Won
Visual Effects Society Awards	Outstanding Models in a Feature Motion Picture:	The Orchid Hotel	Nominated
Washington D.C. Area Film Critics Association Awards	Best Youth Performance	Tom Holland	Nominated
Young Artist Awards	Best Performance in a Feature Film – Leading Young Actor	Tom Holland	Won
Young Artist Awards	Best Performance in a Feature Film – Supporting Young Actor	Samuel Joslin	Nominated
Young Artist Awards	Best Performance in a Feature Film – Supporting Young Actor Ten and Under	Oaklee Pendergast	Nominated

== See also ==
- List of awards and nominations received by Naomi Watts
- List of awards and nominations received by Ewan McGregor
