= 27th Goya Awards =

- Date: February 17, 2013
- Site: Madrid Marriott Auditorium Hotel, Madrid
- Hosted by: Eva Hache
- Organized by: Academy of Cinematographic Arts and Sciences of Spain

Highlights
- Best Film: Snow White
- Best Actor: José Sacristán; The Dead Man and Being Happy
- Best Actress: Maribel Verdú; Snow White
- Most awards: Snow White (10)
- Most nominations: Snow White (18)

Television coverage
- Network: TVE

The 27th Goya Awards were presented at the Madrid Marriott Auditorium Hotel in Madrid on February 17, 2013 to honour the best in Spanish films of 2012. Comedian Eva Hache was the master of ceremonies for the second year in a row. Nominees were announced on January 8, 2013. Snow White was nominated in every category for which it was eligible (except for Best Sound) and won ten awards, including Best Film, Best Actress and Best Original Screenplay.

== Winners and nominees ==
The winners and nominees are listed as follows:

Best Film: Snow White; The Artist and the Model; Unit 7; The Impossible	Best Director: Juan Antonio Bayona — The Impossible; Pablo Berger — Snow White; Fernando Trueba — The Artist and the Model; Alberto Rodríguez — Unit 7
Best Actor: José Sacristán — The Dead Man and Being Happy; Daniel Giménez Cacho — Snow White; Jean Rochefort — The Artist and the Model; Antonio de la Torre — Unit 7	Best Actress: Maribel Verdú — Snow White; Aida Folch — The Artist and the Model; Naomi Watts — The Impossible; Penélope Cruz — Twice Born
Best Supporting Actor: Julián Villagrán — Unit 7; Josep Maria Pou — Snow White; Antonio de la Torre — Invader; Ewan McGregor — The Impossible	Best Supporting Actress: Candela Peña — A Gun in Each Hand; Ángela Molina — Snow White; María León — Carmina or Blow Up; Chus Lampreave — The Artist and the Model
Best New Actor: Joaquín Núñez — Unit 7; Emilio Gavira — Snow White; Àlex Monner — The Wild Ones; Tom Holland — The Impossible	Best New Actress: Macarena García — Snow White; Carmina Barrios — Carmina or Blow Up; Cati Solivellas — The Wild Ones; Estefanía de los Santos — Unit 7
Best Original Screenplay: Pablo Berger — Snow White; Fernando Trueba, Jean-Claude Carrière — The Artist and the Model; Unit 7 — Rafael Cobos, Alberto Rodríguez; The Impossible — Sergio G. Sánchez, María Belón	Best Adapted Screenplay: Javier Barreira, Gorka Magallón, Ignacio del Moral, Jordi Gasull, Neil Landau — Tad, The Lost Explorer; Jorge Guerricaechevarría, Sergio G. Sánchez — The End; Javier Gullón, Jorge Arenillas — Invader; Ramón Salazar Hoogers — I Want You; Manuel Rivas — All Is Silence
Best Ibero-American Film: Juan of the Dead (Cuba/Spain); 7 Boxes (Paraguay/Spain); After Lucia (Mexico); Clandestine Childhood (Argentina/Spain)	Best European Film: The Intouchables; Rust and Bone; In the House; Shame
Best New Director: Enrique Gato — Tad, The Lost Explorer; Paco León — Carmina or Blow Up; Oriol Paulo — The Body; Isabel de Ocampo — Evelyn	Best Animated Film: Tad, The Lost Explorer; El corazón del roble; The Apostle; The Wish Fish
Best Cinematography: Kiko de la Rica — Snow White; Daniel Vilar — The Artist and the Model; Óscar Faura — The Impossible; Álex Catalán — Unit 7	Best Editing: Elena Ruiz, Bernat Vilaplana — The Impossible; Fernando Franco — Snow White; Marta Velasco — The Artist and the Model; José M. G. Moyano — Unit 7; David Pinillos, Antonio Frutos — Invader
Best Art Direction: Alain Bainée — Snow White; Pilar Revuelta — The Artist and the Model; Eugenio Caballero — The Impossible; Pepe Domínguez del Olmo — Unit 7	Best Production Supervision: Sandra Hermida Muñiz— The Impossible; Josep Amorós — Snow White; Angélica Huete — The Artist and the Model; Manuela Ocón — Unit 7
Best Sound: Peter Glossop, Marc Orts, Oriol Tarragó — The Impossible; Sergio Burmann, Nicolás de Poulpiquet, James Muñoz — Invader; Pierre Gamet, Nacho Royo-Villanova, Eduardo García Castro — The Artist and the Model; Daniel de Zayas Ramírez, Nacho Royo-Villanova, Pelayo Gutiérrez — Unit 7	Best Special Effects: Pau Costa, Félix Bergés — The Impossible; Reyes Abades, Ferrán Piquer — Snow White; Reyes Abades, Isidro Jiménez — Invader; Juan Ventura — Unit 7
Best Costume Design: Paco Delgado — Snow White; Lala Huete — The Artist and the Model; Fernando García — Unit 7; Vicente Ruiz — Picasso's Gang	Best Makeup and Hairstyles: Sylvie Imbert, Fermín Galán — Snow White; Sylvie Imbert, Noé Montés — The Artist and the Model; The Impossible — Alessandro Bertolazzi, David Martí, Montse Ribé; Yolanda Piña — Unit 7
Best Original Score: Alfonso de Villalonga — Snow White; Julio de la Rosa — Unit 7; Álex Martínez, Zacarías M. de la Riva — Tad, the Lost Explorer; Fernando Velázquez — The Impossible	Best Original Song: Pablo Berger, Juan Gómez "Chicuelo" — "No te puedo encontrar" (Snow White); Víctor M. Peinado, Pablo Cervantes Gutiérrez, Pablo José Fernández Brenes — "Líneas paralelas" (The Wild Ones); Alfonso Albacete, Juan Bardem Aguado — "L'as Tu Vue?" (Picasso's Gang); Juan Magán — "Te voy a esperar" (Tad, The Lost Explorer)
Best Fictional Short Film: That Wasn't Me; La boda; Ojos que no ven; Voice Over	Best Animated Short Film: El vendedor de humo; Alfred y Anna; La mano de Nefertiti; ¿Por qué desaparecieron los dinosaurios?
Best Documentary Film: Sons of the Clouds; Contra el tiempo; Los mundos sutiles; Mapa	Best Documentary Short Film: A Story for the Modlins; El violinista de Auschwitz; Las viudas de Ifni; Un cineasta en La Codorniz

== Honorary Goya ==
- Concha Velasco
