= List of Argentine films of 2012 =

This is a list of Argentine films of 2012

Argentine films of 2012
| Title | Director | Release | Genre |
A - C
| 3 | Pablo Stoll | July 5 | Comedy-drama |
| 75 habitantes, 20 casas, 300 vacas | Fernando Domínguez | May 3 | Documentary |
| Agua y sal | Alejo Taube | January 12 | Drama |
| Acorralados | Julio Bove | June 7 | |
| Alumbrando en la oscuridad | Mónica Gazpio | October 18 | |
| Amor a mares | Ezequiel Crupnicoff | November 15 | Comedy |
| Ánima Buenos Aires | María Verónica Ramírez | May 3 | Animation |
| ¡Atraco! | Eduard Cortés | August 2 | |
| Bichos criollos | Diego Lombardi | May 17 | Documentary |
| Chacú | Felipe Pigna | February 2 | Documentary |
| Cuentas del alma. Confesiones de una guerrillera | Mario Bomheker | August 9 | Documentary |
D - E
| Darío Santillán, la dignidad rebelde | Miguel Mirra | April 26 | Documentary |
| Días de vinilo | Gabriel Nesci | September 27 | |
| Las 10 últimas preguntas | Güido Simonetti | August 7 | Short |
| Domingo de Ramos | José Glusman | January 19 | Suspense |
| Dormir al sol | Alejandro Chomski | March 15 | Fantasy |
| Dos más dos | Diego Kaplan | August 16 | Comedy |
| Dulce de leche | Mariano Galperín | November 29 | |
| Errantes | Lisandro González Ursi | October 18 | |
| El etnógrafo | Ulises Rosell | September 8 | Documentary |
| El impenetrable | Daniele Incalcaterra | November 29 | Documentary |
| El gran río | Rubén Plataneo | July 5 | |
| Everybody Has a Plan | Ana Piterbarg | August 30 | Drama / Crime |
| Extraños en la noche | Alejandro Montiel | April 5 | Comedy / Mystery |
F - O
| Gone Fishing | Carlos Sorín | November 15 | Drama |
| Gricel. Un amor en tiempo de tango | Jorge Leandro Colás | November 29 | Documentary |
| Habano y cigarrillos | Diego Recalde | June 14 | |
| Historias breves 7 | Martín Salinas | August 2 | |
| Hombre bebiendo luz | Jorge Falcone | August 23 | Documentary |
| In the Open | Hernán Belón | May 3 | Drama |
| La casa | Gustavo Fontán | November 8 | |
| La cola | Enrique Liporace | September 13 | Comedy |
| La despedida | Juan Manuel D'Emilio | August 23 | |
| Las Pibas | Raúl Perrone | April 13 | Drama |
| La revolución es un sueño eterno | Nemesio Juárez | May 17 | Biographical |
| Longchamps | Andrés Andreani | November 1 | Mystery |
| Los actos cotidianos | Raúl Perrone | May 10 | Drama |
| Moacir | Tomás Lipgot | February 2 | Documentary; Musical |
| Néstor Kirchner, la película | Paula de Luque | November 22 | Documentary |
| Novias - Madrinas - 15 años | Pablo Levy y Diego Levy | February 23 | Documentary |
| Olympia | Leo Damario | February 12 | Indie |
| Penumbra | Adrián García Bogliano y Ramiro García Bogliano | February 9 | Suspense; Horror |
| Peter Capusotto y sus 3 dimensiones | Pedro Saborido | January 26 | Animation; Comedy |
| Que lo pague la noche | Néstor Mazzini | February 2 | Suspense; Drama |
| Selkirk, el verdadero Robinson Crusoe | Walter Tournier | February 2 | Animation |
| The Chosen Heaven | Víctor González | September 20 | Drama / Thriller |
| The Forbidden Education | German Doin | August 18 | Documentary |
| The German Friend | Jeanine Meerapfel | October 4 | Drama |
| The Vampire Spider | Gabriel Medina | October 4 | Drama/Horror |
| Un mundo seguro | Eduardo Spagnuolo | January 5 | Drama; Suspense |
| White Elephant | Pablo Trapero | May 21 | Drama |
| Yatasto | Hermes Paralluelo | February 16 | Documentary |
