= Hold-Up! (2012 film) =

- Theatrical release poster
- Spanish: ¡Atraco!
- Directed by: Eduard Cortés
- Written by: Eduard Cortés; Pedro Costa; Piti Español; Marcelo Figueras
- Produced by: Pedro Costa; Gerardo Herrero; Axel Kuschevatzky; Carlos Mentasti; Luis A. Scalella
- Starring: Guillermo Francella; Óscar Jaenada; Amaia Salamanca; Nicolás Cabré; Daniel Fanego; Jordi Martínez; Francesc Albiol
- Cinematography: David Omedes
- Edited by: Fernando Pardo
- Music by: Federico Jusid
- Production companies: Argentina Sono Film S.A.C.I.; Castafiore Films; Pedro Costa PC; Telefe; Tornasol Films
- Release dates: 2 August 2012 (Argentina); 19 October 2012 (Spain)
- Running time: 111 minutes
- Countries: Spain; Argentina
- Language: Spanish

Hold-Up! (Spanish: ¡Atraco!) is a 2012 Spanish-Argentine film directed by Eduard Cortés, filmed in Spain. The script was written by the director with Pedro Costa. The film stars Guillermo Francella, Nicolás Cabré, and Amaia Salamanca.

== Plot ==
In 1950s Spain, a cohort of Argentinians who remain faithful to the ousted president Peron devise a scheme to execute a heist aimed at retrieving the jewels once possessed by the president's deceased wife, Evita.

== Cast ==
- Guillermo Francella – Merello
- Nicolás Cabré – Miguel
- Amaia Salamanca – Teresa
- Daniel Fanego – Landa
- Oscar Jaenada – Ramos
- Jordi Martínez – Naranjo
- Francesc Albiol
- Félix Cubero
- Bárbara de Lema
- Jorge Suquet
- Esmeralda Moya
- Felipe Vélez
- Chechu Moltó
- Simona Ferrar
- Juan Codina

== See also ==
- List of Argentine films of 2012
- List of Spanish films of 2012
