= The Artist and the Model =

- promotional poster
- Directed by: Fernando Trueba
- Written by: Fernando Trueba; Jean-Claude Carrière
- Produced by: Angélica Huete
- Starring: Jean Rochefort; Aida Folch
- Cinematography: Daniel Vilar
- Edited by: Marta Velasco
- Production companies: Fernando Trueba P.C. Bonne Pioche
- Release dates: 23 September 2012 (2012 SSIFF); 2 August 2013 (United States)
- Running time: 104 minutes
- Country: Spain
- Language: French
- Box office: $1,492,780

The Artist and the Model (French: L'artiste et son modèle, Spanish: El artista y la modelo) is a 2012 French-language Spanish drama film directed by Fernando Trueba and written by Trueba and Jean-Claude Carrière. In 2012, Fernando Trueba was nominated for the Golden Shell and won the Silver Shell for Best Director at the San Sebastián International Film Festival. The year after, the film was nominated for 13 categories in the 27th Goya Awards, including Best Film and Best Director.

== Plot ==
In the summer of 1943 in occupied France, a famous sculptor, tired of life, finds a desire to return to work with the arrival of a young Spanish woman who has escaped from a refugee camp and becomes his muse.

== Cast ==
- Jean Rochefort as Marc Cros
- Aida Folch as Mercè
- Claudia Cardinale as Léa
- Götz Otto as Werner
- Chus Lampreave as María
- Christian Sinniger as Émile
- Martin Gamet as Pierre
- Mateo Deluz as Henri

== Reception ==
=== Critical response ===
The Artist and the Model has an approval rating of 71% on review aggregator website Rotten Tomatoes, based on 42 reviews, and an average rating of 6.4/10. Metacritic assigned the film a weighted average score of 53 out of 100, based on 18 critics, indicating "mixed or average reviews".

=== Accolades ===
List of awards and nominations
Award	Category	Nominee	Result
2012 San Sebastián International Film Festival	Golden Seashell	Fernando Trueba	Nominated
2012 San Sebastián International Film Festival	Silver Shell for Best Director	Fernando Trueba	Won
27th Goya Awards	Best Film	Fernando Trueba	Nominated
27th Goya Awards	Best Director	Fernando Trueba	Nominated
27th Goya Awards	Best Actor	Jean Rochefort	Nominated
27th Goya Awards	Best Actress	Aida Folch	Nominated
27th Goya Awards	Best Supporting Actress	Chus Lampreave	Nominated
27th Goya Awards	Best Original Screenplay	Fernando Trueba and Jean-Claude Carrière	Nominated
27th Goya Awards	Best Cinematography	Daniel Vilar	Nominated
27th Goya Awards	Best Editing	Marta Velasco	Nominated
27th Goya Awards	Best Art Direction	Pilar Revuelta	Nominated
27th Goya Awards	Best Production Supervision	Angélica Huete	Nominated
27th Goya Awards	Best Sound	Pierre Gamet, Nacho Royo-Villanova and Eduardo García Castro	Nominated
27th Goya Awards	Best Costume Design	Lola Huete	Nominated
27th Goya Awards	Best Makeup and Hairstyles	Sylvie Imbert and Noé Montés	Nominated

== See also ==
- List of Spanish films of 2012
