= Antonio Chavarrías =

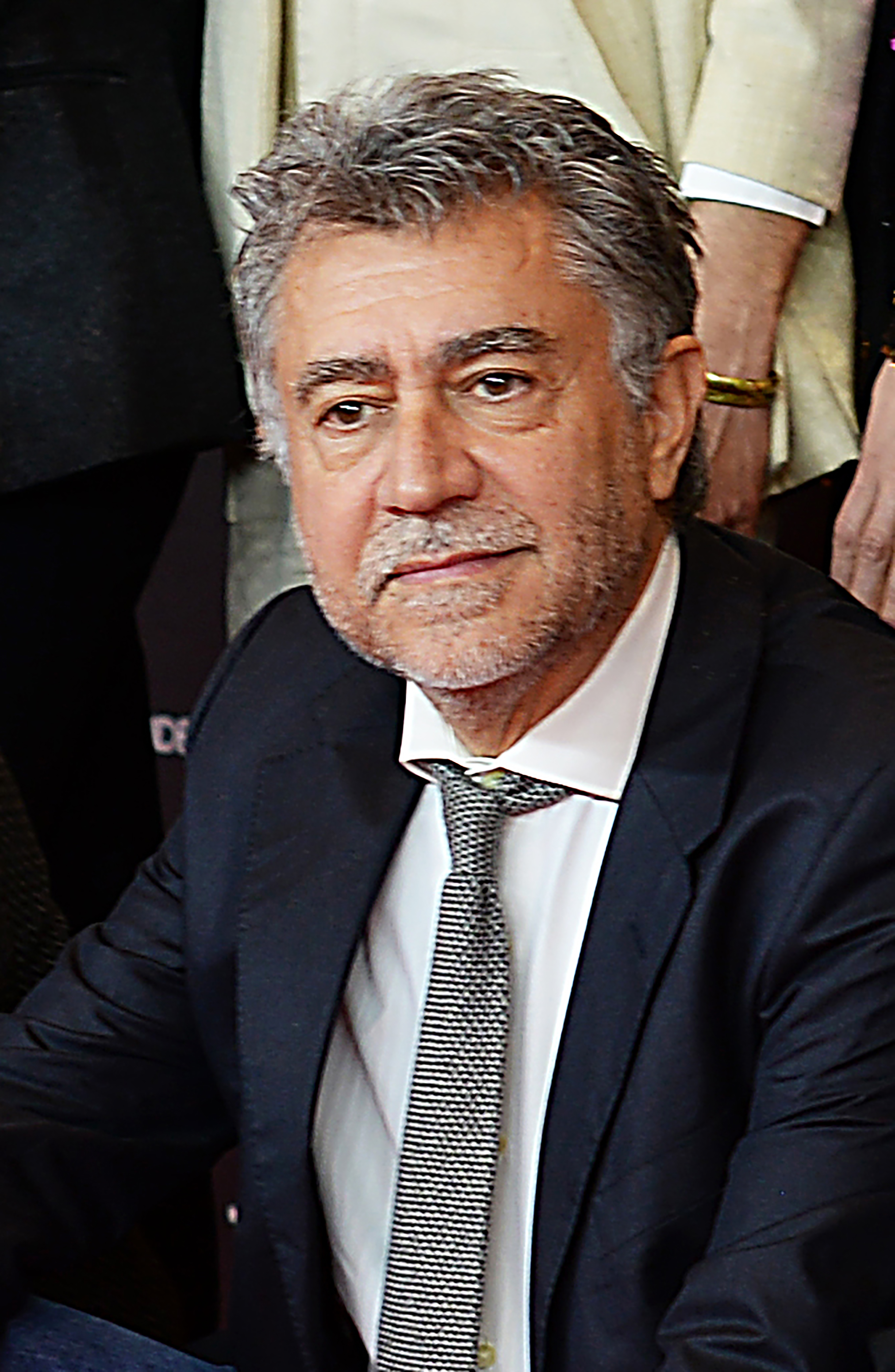
- Born: 1956 (age 68–69); L'Hospitalet de Llobregat, Spain
- Occupations: Film director, screenwriter, producer
- Years active: 1989-present
- Website: oberoncinematografica.com

Antonio Chavarrías (Hospitalet de Llobregat, Barcelona, 1956) is a Spanish filmmaker, screenwriter and film producer. Some of his most recognised films are Childish Games (2012), showed at the 2012 Berlinale (2012), Celia's Lives (2006), exhibited at the San Sebastián International Film Festival, and You'll Be Back (2002), which earned him a nomination for the Goya Awards for the Best Adapted Screenplay in 2002.

Chavarrías has produced several films some of which have been exhibited and received award nominations at festivals such as the Cannes Film Festival, the Rotterdam Film Festival, the Sundance Film Festival, and the Berlinale. In 1990, he founded his film production company, Oberon Cinematográfica.

== As screenwriter and director ==
Antonio Chavarrías is the scriptwriter and director of Childish Games (2012), a movie which was exhibited in the Official Section of the Berlin International Film Festival in 2012. The film stars Juan Diego Botto, Bárbara Lennie, Mágica Pérez and Nora Navas.

In 2006, he wrote and directed Celia's Lives, a drama which was shown in the Official Section of the San Sebastián International Film Festival (2006) and in the Marrakech International Film Festival (2006). The leading actors are: Najwa Nimri, Luis Tosar, Daniel Giménez Cacho, and Aida Folch.

Chavarrías is also the screenwriter and director of You'll be back (2002), based on Francisco Casavella's novel A Spanish Dwarf Commits Suicide in Las Vegas. The movie won the Award for Best Director in the Mar Del Plata Film Festival and won the 2004 Ariel Award for Best Adapted Screenplay and was also nominated for the Goya Award for the Best Adapted Screenplay in 2003.

Some of his other films include: Susanna (1996), Manila (1991), and A Shadow in the Garden (Una sombra en el jardin)(1989) for which Chavarrías won several awards and was screened at many festivals.

In 2015, Chavarrías was preparing a new project: The Chosen, an historical thriller about the assassination of Leon Trotsky. It was scheduled to be filmed in Barcelona and Mexico an deals with the last year of Trotsky's life in Mexico. This new project is a co-production between Oberon Cinematográfica and Alebrije Cine y Video, film producer Mónica Lozano's company known for movies such as Instructions not included (2013) or Amores Perros (Love's a Bitch) (2000).

In 2023, he shot historical drama film The Abbess.

== As producer ==
In 1990, Chavarrías founded his production company Oberon Cinematográfica which has produced over thirty films, both his own as well as films by other directors. Some of his production company's most recognised productions include:

The Milk of Sorrow (2009) by Claudia Llosa was nominated for an Oscar for Best Foreign Language Film in 2010, and won the Golden Bear of Berlin in 2009, and Madeinusa (2006) also by Llosa whose awards include the Grand Jury Award at the Sundance Film Festival.

The Fear (2013) by Jordi Cadena won the Gaudí Award for Best Supporting Actor, and his film Elisa K (2010) won the Special Jury Award at the San Sebástian International Film Festival in 2010.

Marc Recha's movie Pau and His Brother (2001) was exhibited in the Official Section of the Cannes International Film Festival in 2001 and The Cherry Tree won the FIPRESCI Award at the Locarno International Film Festival in 1998.

Chavarria's company also produced the Ariel Award winning Aro Tolbukhin. En la mente del asesino (2002) by Agustí Villaronga, Lydia Zimmermann and Isaac Pierre Racine.

== Other awards and recognition ==
In 2012, the book Filmmakers of the Film Library of Catalonia was published dedicated to Chavarria's film career. The book was written by Elisabet Cabeza, a journalist and university professor specializing in cinema.

Antonio Chavarrías was vice president of the Spanish Academy of Arts and Cinematographic Sciences from 2000 to 2003.

You'll be Back was the winner of the Best Edition Award at the Barcelona Film Awards.

Susanna was an Official Section in the Brussels International Film Festival and winner of the Best Director Award at the Verona Film Festival.

Manila was winner of the Best Director of the Cinematography Award from the Government of Catalonia.

A Shadow in the Garden was the winner of the Best Director of the Cinematography Award from the Government of Catalonia and winner of the First Work Award at the Sant Jordi Awards.
