= El Continental =

2018 Spanish-language television series

- Genre: Period drama; Crime
- Created by: Frank Ariza
- Screenplay by: Frank Ariza
- Directed by: Frank Ariza
- Starring: Michelle Jenner; Álex García; Roberto Álamo; Christian Sánchez; Fernando Tejero; Secun de la Rosa; Paz Vega; Estefanía de los Santos; María Isabel Díaz; Mariola Fuentes
- Country of origin: Spain
- Original language: Spanish
- No. of seasons: 1
- No. of episodes: 10

Production
- Running time: 70 min (approx.)
- Production companies: RTVE; Gossip Events

Original release
- Network: La 1
- Release: 17 September – 20 November 2018

El Continental is a Spanish drama television series about organised crime set in 1920s Spain. Created, written and directed by Frank Ariza, it aired from September to November 2018 on La 1. Harshly criticised during its pre-screening at the FesTVal and with dismal ratings during its free-to-air broadcasting run, the series was described as "the biggest fiasco of national (Spanish) fiction in recent times".

== Premises ==
The series, set in the 1920s Madrid, is titled after a fictional club in which illegal businesses take place. The fiction tracks both the struggle over clandestine businesses in the city and the relationship between Andrea Abascal (Michelle Jenner) and Ricardo León (Álex García).

== Cast ==
- Michelle Jenner as Andrea Abascal.
- Álex García as Ricardo León.
- Roberto Álamo as Juan Baena
- Christian Sánchez as Perico
- Fernando Tejero as Ramiro
- Secun de la Rosa as Francisco
- Paz Vega as Belice
- Estefanía de los Santos as Gloria
- María Isabel Díaz as Lisette
- Mariola Fuentes as Clara
- Franky Martín as Chano.
- Raúl Tejón as Julián.
- María Hinojosa as Rosa.
- Chanel Terrero as Julieta.
- Patxi Freytez as Ramón.
- Mario Plágaro as Lope.
- Eloy Azorín as El Rubio.
- Lucía Guerrero as Cristina.
- Manu Vega as Jorge.
- Carmina Barrios as Celeste.
- José Lamuño as Cristóbal.
- Ruth Gabriel as Maribel.
- Manuel Bandera as Comisario.

With the special collaboration of

- María Alfonsa Rosso as Mami.
- Raúl Arévalo as Andrés.
- Juan José Ballesta as Pablo.
- Manolo Solo as Alfonso.
- Luis Callejo as Benítez.
- Alexandra Jiménez as Ángela.
- Antonio de la Torre as Juan.

== Production and release ==
Created, written and directed by Frank Ariza, El Continental was produced by RTVE in collaboration with Gossip Events. Consisting of 10 episodes with a running time of around 70 minutes, the series was shot in a film set in San Sebastián de los Reyes and in the Príncipe Pío train station in Madrid.

Derided in social media already since the release of the first images as a knock-off of Peaky Blinders, the series also received harsh reviews by professional critics after its pre-screening at the FesTVal in Vitoria. It premiered on La 1 on 17 September 2018 with a "correct" 10.4% audience share in prime time, only to sink down to a 2.8% audience share in the season finale aired on 20 November 2018, when the series had been already moved to the late night slot. At the time of its closure, the series was described as "the biggest fiasco of national (Spanish) fiction in recent times".

Series	Episodes	Originally released			Viewers	Share (%)	Ref.
Series	Episodes	First released	Last released	Network	Viewers	Share (%)	Ref.
1	10	17 September 2018	20 November 2018	tve	507,000	4.6	

This is a caption
No. in season	Title	Directed by	Written by	Viewers	Original release date	Share (%)
1	"O pagas o cobras"	Frank Ariza	Frank Ariza	1,523,000	17 September 2018	10.4
2	"Primer paso aprender, segundo superar"	Frank Ariza	Frank Ariza	793,000	24 September 2018	5.7
3	"Y ¿por qué?... Por todo"	Frank Ariza	Frank Ariza	906,000	1 October 2018	5.8
4	"Por todo... O por nada"	Frank Ariza	Frank Ariza	778,000	8 October 2018	4.9
5	"Magia"	Frank Ariza	Frank Ariza	174,000	16 October 2018	3.5
6	"Matar al mensajero"	Frank Ariza	Frank Ariza	164,000	23 October 2018	3.0
7	"Réquiem... mami"	Frank Ariza	Frank Ariza	153,000	30 October 2018	3.0
8	"Truco o trato"	Frank Ariza	Frank Ariza	224,000	6 November 2018	3.5
9	"Pactos de sangre"	Frank Ariza	Frank Ariza	171,000	13 November 2018	3.4
10	"La guerra por una doncella"	Frank Ariza	Frank Ariza	189,000	20 November 2018	2.8
