= Everybody Has a Plan =

- Original theatrical release poster
- Spanish: Todos tenemos un plan
- Directed by: Ana Piterbarg
- Written by: Ana Piterbarg; Anna Cohan
- Produced by: Gerardo Herrero; Mariela Besuievski; Vanessa Ragone; Axel Kuschevatzky; Felipe Saldarriaga; Julia Solomonoff
- Starring: Viggo Mortensen; Soledad Villamil; Sofía Gala
- Cinematography: Lucio Bonelli
- Edited by: Irene Blecua; Alejandro Lázaro
- Music by: Lucio Godoy; Federico Jusid
- Production companies: Castafiore Films; Haddock Films; Telefe; Tornasol Films surDream Productions
- Distributed by: 20th Century Fox
- Release dates: 30 August 2012 (Argentina); 7 September 2012 (Spain)
- Running time: 118 minutes
- Countries: Spain; Argentina; Germany
- Language: Spanish

Everybody Has a Plan (Spanish: Todos tenemos un plan) is a 2012 Argentine crime thriller film directed by Ana Piterbarg and starring Viggo Mortensen and Soledad Villamil. It was written by Anna Cohan and Ana Piterbarg. It is an Argentine-Spanish-German co-production.

== Synopsis ==
Agustín (Viggo Mortensen) is a man desperate to abandon what has gradually become a frustrating existence after living for years in Buenos Aires. After his twin brother Pedro's death (Viggo Mortensen), Agustín sets out to begin a new life assuming Pedro's identity and returning to the mysterious Paraná Delta region, which was the childhood home of both brothers. However, shortly after his return, Agustín is involuntarily involved in the dangerous criminal world that his brother had been part of.

== Cast ==
- Viggo Mortensen as Agustín / Pedro
- Soledad Villamil as Claudia
- Daniel Fanego as. Adrián
- Javier Godino as Rubén
- Sofía Gala Castiglione as Rosa
- Oscar Alegre as Amadeo Mendizábal
- Joaquín Daniel as Forensic
- Carolina Román as Nurse with the baby
- Sergio Boris as Francisco Mendizábal
- Alberto Ajaka as Fernando Mendizábal

== Reception ==
Manuel Piñón of Cinemanía rated the "surprising" noir film 4 out of 5 stars, considering that it is "written with astounding smarts and accuracy".

Rob Nelson of Variety considered that the "tepid" Spanish-language drama is undermined by its "slow pacing, thinly drawn characters, a limp climax and humorless tone".

== See also ==
- List of Argentine films of 2012
- List of Spanish films of 2012
