= Invader (2012 film) =

- Theatrical release poster
- Spanish: Invasor
- Directed by: Daniel Calparsoro
- Screenplay by: Javier Gullón; Jorge Arenillas
- Based on: Invasor by Fernando Marías
- Produced by: Juan Gordon; Emma Lustres; Borja Pena
- Starring: Alberto Ammann; Antonio de la Torre; Karra Elejalde; Inma Cuesta; Luis Zahera; Bernabé Fernández
- Cinematography: Daniel Aranyó
- Edited by: David Pinillos; Antonio Frutos
- Music by: Lucas Vidal
- Production companies: Vaca Films; Morena Films; Mandarin Cinema
- Distributed by: Buena Vista International (es)
- Release date: 30 November 2012 (Spain)
- Countries: Spain; France
- Languages: Spanish; English; Arabic

Invader (Spanish: Invasor) is a 2012 Spanish-French action thriller film directed by Daniel Calparsoro which stars Alberto Ammann, Antonio de la Torre, Karra Elejalde and Inma Cuesta. It is based on Fernando Marías's 2003 novel Invasor.

== Plot ==
Pablo, a Spanish military physician, suffers an attack in Iraq that leaves him badly wounded. Upon returning home with his wife Ángela and daughter Pilar, a recovering Pablo begins to cast doubt on the official version of the events.

== Cast ==
- Alberto Ammann as Pablo
- Antonio de la Torre as Diego
- Inma Cuesta as Ángela
- Karra Elejalde as Baza
- Sofía Oria as Pilar
- Luis Zahera as Arturo
- Bernabé Fernández as Soldado pelirrojo
- Fran Peleteiro as Ramón
- Julio Pereira as Carlos
- Alex Hafner as American executor

== Production ==
Based on the novel Invasor by Fernando Marías, the screenplay was penned by Javier Gullón and Jorge Arenillas. The film was produced by Vaca Films and Morena Films in co-production with Mandarin, with the participation and collaboration of TVE, Canal+, Ono, TVG, and Xunta de Galicia. The film was shot in Fuerteventura and Lanzarote (in the Canary Islands) as well as in A Coruña (Galicia).

== Release ==
Distributed by Buena Vista International, the film was theatrically released in Spain on 30 November 2012.

== Reception ==
Irene Crespo of Cinemanía rated the film 3 out of 5 stars, assessing the conspiracy-heavy film to "go all in in the action side and falling halfway in the thriller side", featuring "action scenes perfectly choreographed and sized to the needs of the story, making for an enjoyable time", with the story losing credibility as it delves into the protagonist's moral dilemmas.

Pere Vall of Fotogramas rated the film 2 out of 5 stars, considering that the backdrop (involving plots and corruption) in which the mishaps of the protagonist take place is not sketched adequately enough, while citing some action scenes and the cast's soundness to be among the best things about the film.

Jonathan Holland of Variety deemed the film—"a Spanish contribution to the burgeoning genre of Iraq-themed anti-war movies"—to be a "highly charged, good-looking but deeply flawed thriller about governmental spin".

Raquel Hernández Luján of HobbyConsolas scored 70 out of 100 points ("good"), considering the "fabulous" cinematography as well as the choice of camera shots to be the best things about the film, while singling out the film's failure to thrill (or convince) in its central section and the way information is provided to be the worst things about it.

== Accolades ==
Year	Award	Category	Nominee(s)	Result	Ref.
2013	27th Goya Awards	Best Adapted Screenplay	Javier Gullón, Jorge Arenillas	Nominated	
2013	27th Goya Awards	Best Supporting Actor	Antonio de la Torre	Nominated	
2013	27th Goya Awards	Best Editing	Antonio Frutos, David Pinillos	Nominated	
2013	27th Goya Awards	Best Sound	Sergio Bürmann, Nicolás de Poulpiquet, James Muñoz	Nominated	
2013	27th Goya Awards	Best Special Effects	Reyes Abades, Isidro Jiménez	Nominated	
2013	11th Mestre Mateo Awards	Best Feature Film		Nominated	
2013	11th Mestre Mateo Awards	Best Supporting Actor	Antonio de la Torre	Nominated	
2013	11th Mestre Mateo Awards	Best Supporting Actor	Karra Elejalde	Nominated	
2013	11th Mestre Mateo Awards	Best Supporting Actress	Inma Cuesta	Nominated	
2013	11th Mestre Mateo Awards	Best Direction	Daniel Calparsoro	Nominated	
2013	11th Mestre Mateo Awards	Best Art Direction	Juan Pedro de Gaspar	Nominated	
2013	11th Mestre Mateo Awards	Best Screenplay	Javier Gullón, Jorge Arenillas	Nominated	
2013	11th Mestre Mateo Awards	Best Editing	Antonio Frutos, David Pinillos	Won	
2013	11th Mestre Mateo Awards	Best Sound	Sergio Bürmann, James Muñoz, Nicolás de Poulpiquet	Nominated	
2013	11th Mestre Mateo Awards	Best Makeup and Hairstyles	Raquel F. Fidalgo, Paco Rodríguez	Nominated	
2013	11th Mestre Mateo Awards	Best Production Supervision	Jordi Berenguer	Nominated	

== See also ==
- List of Spanish films of 2012
