= Fuego (2014 film) =

- Theatrical release poster
- Directed by: Luis Marías
- Screenplay by: Luis Marías
- Produced by: Gerardo Herrero; Javier López Blanco; Luis Marías; Ramon Vidal
- Starring: José Coronado; Aida Folch; Leyre Berrocal; Montse Mostaza; Jaime Adalid; Gorka Zufiaurre
- Cinematography: Pau Monràs
- Edited by: Ainara López Bermejo
- Music by: Aritz Villodas
- Production companies: Tornasol Films; Historias del Tío Luis; Fausto Producciones
- Distributed by: Syldavia Cinema
- Release dates: 22 November 2014 (FICXixón); 28 November 2014 (Spain)
- Country: Spain
- Languages: Spanish; Basque

Fuego is a 2014 Spanish thriller film directed by Luis Marías and starring José Coronado, Aida Folch, and Leyre Berrocal.

== Plot ==
11 years after surviving an ETA car bomb attack that killed his wife and left his 10-year-old daughter Alba mutilated, hateful former cop Carlos (now living in Barcelona and working in the security sector) only thinks about vengeance.

== Cast ==
- José Coronado as Carlos
- Aida Folch as Alba
- Leyre Berrocal as Ohiana
- Montse Mostaza as Marina
- Gorka Zufiaurre as Aritz
- Jaime Adalid as Mariusz

== Production ==
The film is a Tornasol Films, Historias del Tío Luis, and Fausto Producciones production, and it had the collaboration of TVC and EiTB, and backing from ICAA, the Basque Government, and Ayuntamiento de Bilbao. It was shot in Spanish and Basque. Shooting locations included Barcelona, Bilbao, Lekeitio, Bermeo, Gatika, and Gorliz.

== Release ==
The film was presented at the 52nd Gijón International Film Festival (FICXixón) on 22 November 2014. Distributed by Syldavia Cinema, it was released theatrically in Spain on 28 November 2014.

== Reception ==
Javier Ocaña of El País deemed the film "a challenging and very courageous attempt that, nevertheless, is shipwrecked both by a lack of complexity and by narrative and technical imbalances".

Manuel Piñón of Cinemanía justified the only star out of 5 he give to the film, because "at least a spiritual retreat is due for Marías so he can reexamine the innumerable errors of his film".

== See also ==
- List of Spanish films of 2014
