= The Violet Look =

- Theatrical release poster
- Spanish: La mirada violeta
- Directed by: Nacho Pérez de la Paz; Jesús Ruiz
- Screenplay by: Nacho Pérez de la Paz; Jesús Ruiz
- Story by: Nacho Pérez de la Paz; Jesús Ruiz
- Based on: an original story by by Daniela Fejerman, Inés París, and Cayetana Guillén Cuervo
- Starring: Cayetana Guillén Cuervo; Roberto Enríquez; Isabel Ordaz; Julieta Serrano; Asier Etxeandia; Aida Folch; Nilo Mur; Luis Hostalot; Alberto Jiménez; Adrià Collado; Chisco Amado; Mariví Bilbao; Gemma Cuervo
- Cinematography: Aitor Mantxola
- Edited by: Fernando Pardo
- Production companies: Mundo Ficción; Violeta Films
- Distributed by: Columbia TriStar Films de España
- Release dates: 23 April 2004 (Málaga); 30 April 2004 (Spain)
- Country: Spain
- Language: Spanish

La mirada violeta is a 2004 Spanish film directed by Nacho Pérez de la Paz and Jesús Ruiz which stars Cayetana Guillén Cuervo.

== Plot ==
The plot follows the plight of Violeta, torn between a stable relationship with Ari and an active and varied sexual life.

== Cast ==
- Cayetana Guillén Cuervo as Violeta
- Roberto Enríquez as Iván
- Isabel Ordaz as Berta
- Julieta Serrano as Violeta's mother
- Asier Etxeandia as Sergio
- Aida Folch as Sofía
- Nilo Mur as Andrés
- Luis Hostalot
- Alberto Jiménez as Ari
- Adrià Collado
- Chisco Amado as Raúl
- Mariví Bilbao
- Gemma Cuervo

== Production ==
The screenplay was penned by the helmers Nacho Pérez de la Paz and Jesús Ruiz, rewriting an early draft by Cayetana Guillén Cuervo, Daniela Fejerman, and Inés París. The film is Mundo Ficción and Violeta Films production. It was shot in Madrid in the Summer of 2003. It boasted a €1.3 million budget.

== Release ==
The film opened the 7th Málaga Film Festival on 23 April 2004. Distributed by Columbia TriStar Spain, it was released theatrically in Spain on 30 April 2004.

== Reception ==
Jonathan Holland of Variety assessed that "the overlong, dialogue-heavy pic remains monotone, with Guillen struggling but failing to make her charmless anti-heroine appealing".

== See also ==
- List of Spanish films of 2004
