= 25 Carat =

- Film poster
- Spanish: 25 kilates
- Catalan: 25 quirats
- Directed by: Patxi Amezcua
- Starring: Francesc Garrido; Aida Folch; Manuel Morón; Joan Massotkleiner; Héctor Colomé
- Cinematography: Sergi Gallardo
- Edited by: Lucas Nolla
- Music by: Francesc Amat
- Production companies: Icónica; Ovideo
- Distributed by: Golem
- Release dates: 2008 (Tudela); 24 April 2009 (Spain)
- Country: Spain
- Languages: Spanish; Catalan

25 Carat (Spanish: 25 kilates; Catalan: 25 quirats) is a 2008 Spanish thriller film directed by Patxi Amezcua which stars Francesc Garrido, Aida Folch, Manuel Morón, and Joan Massotkleiner. It features dialogue in Spanish and Catalan.

== Plot ==
Set in Barcelona, the plot follows former boxer turned debt collector Abel, who helps young thief Kay during one of the latter's criminal actions.

== Cast ==
- Francesc Garrido as Abel
- Aida Folch as Kay
- Manuel Morón as Sebas
- Joan Massotkleiner as Garro
- Marc Garcia as Adrian
- Héctor Colomé as Domingo
- Maria Lanau as Rocío

== Production ==
The film was produced by Icónica and Ovideo with the association of TVE and TVC. It features dialogue in Spanish and Catalan. Filming began on 14 January 2008. Shooting locations included Barcelona.

== Release ==
The film screened at the Tudela Film Festival in 2008. Distributed by Golem, the film bowed down in Spanish theatres on 24 April 2019.

== Reception ==
Jonathan Holland of Variety deemed the film to be "the real thing", in a Spanish cinema otherwise rarely throwing up thrillers worthy of the name.

Carlos Boyero of El País deemed 25 Carat to be "a solid debut film that approaches with style and credibility a genre scarcely frequented [in Spain] such as film noir".

Sergio F. Pinilla of Cinemanía rated the film 3½ out of 5 stars deeming it to be "a blunt and dry thriller".

== Accolades ==
Year	Award	Category	Nominee(s)	Result	Ref.
2009	Málaga Film Festival	Best Film (Zonazine Section)		Won	
2009	Málaga Film Festival	Best Actor (Zonazine Section)	Manuel Morón	Won	
2009	Málaga Film Festival	Best Actress (Zonazine Section)	Aida Folch	Won	
2010	11th New York International Latino Film Festival	Best Director	Patxi Amezcua	Won	

== See also ==
- List of Spanish films of 2009
