= Celia's Lives =

- Film poster
- Spanish: Las vidas de Celia
- Directed by: Antonio Chavarrías
- Screenplay by: Antonio Chavarrías
- Starring: Najwa Nimri; Luis Tosar; Daniel Giménez Cacho; Àlex Casanovas; Mentxu Romero; Aida Folch; Javier Díaz; Jimena Ayala; Nora Navas
- Cinematography: Guillermo Granillo
- Edited by: Anastasi Rinos
- Music by: Fernando Corona
- Production companies: Oberon Cinematográfica; TAU; Altavista Films
- Release dates: 26 September 2006 (Zinemaldia); 19 January 2007 (Spain)
- Countries: Spain; Mexico
- Language: Spanish

Celia's Lives (Spanish: Las vidas de Celia) is a 2006 Spanish-Mexican drama film directed and written by Antonio Chavarrías which stars Najwa Nimri and Luis Tosar.

== Plot ==
The night Celia unsuccessfully attempts suicide, a teenage girl (Melany) is raped and murdered nearby. Miguel Ángel, the police officer in charge of finding the perpetrator of the crime, digs around Celia and her closest circle, including her two sisters (Carmen and Ángela) and her husband Agustín. While the cop suspects about the girl's boyfriend (Pedro), Celia suspects about her husband.

== Cast ==
- Najwa Nimri as Celia
- Luis Tosar as Miguel Ángel
- Daniel Giménez Cacho as Agustín
- Àlex Casanovas as Jaime
- Mentxu Romero as Carmen
- Aida Folch as Ángela
- Javier Díaz as Pedro
- Jimena Ayala as Melany
- Nora Navas
- Pep Ricart
- Nausicaa Bonnín

== Production ==
A Spanish-Mexican co-production, the film was produced by Oberon Cinematográfica, TAU, and Altavista Films, and it had the participation of TVE and TVC.

== Release ==
The film was presented at the 54th San Sebastián International Film Festival's official selection in September 2006. It was also selected for the Marrakech International Film Festival's main competition. Distributed by Nirvana, it was theatrically released in Spain on 19 January 2007.

== Reception ==
Jonathan Holland of Variety considered the "cunningly-structured noir" to be Antonio Chavarrías' "finest work to date".

Nuria Vidal of Fotogramas rated the film 3 out of 5 stars, praising "the spaces and the characters", while citing "a certain confusion of times" as a negative point.

Javier Ocaña of El País considered that "with an agile, nervous production and very good performances" (especially by Tosar and Giménez Cacho) the film manages to portray a "desolate" (and perhaps a tad exaggerated) male panorama in relation to their treatment of women.

== See also ==
- List of Spanish films of 2007
