= Las constituyentes =

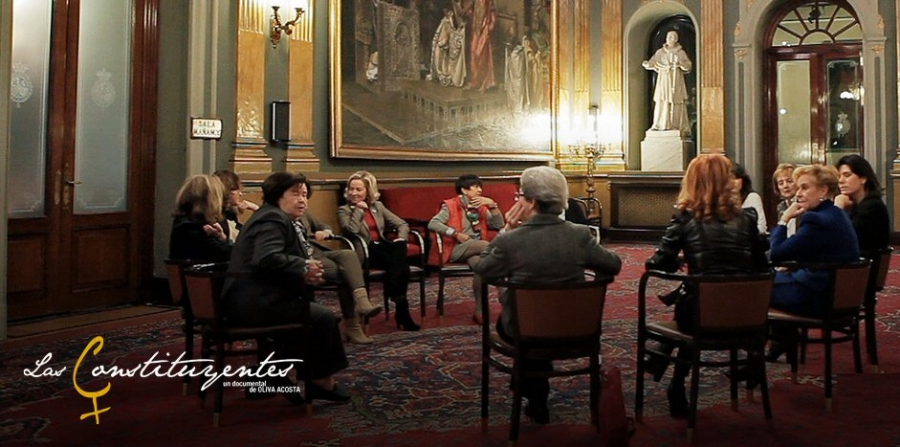
- Directed by: Oliva Acosta
- Written by: Oliva Acosta
- Produced by: Olivavá Producciones
- Cinematography: Andres Garzas
- Edited by: Mariluz Domínguez
- Music by: Alicia Aleman
- Release date: November 5, 2011 (SEFF)
- Running time: 70
- Country: Spain
- Language: Spanish

Las constituyentes is a 2011 documentary film directed by Oliva Acosta about the 27 women, deputies and senators, who participated in the Constituent Cortes. A document that recovers the voice of the first women who acceded to the Parliament after the dictatorship of Francisco Franco, it gathers the history and the political participation of women in Spain. The documentary is subtitled in Spanish, English and French.

The film premiered at the 2011 Seville European Film Festival (SEFF).

== Synopsis ==
The assembly has the testimony of 14 of the 27 parliamentarians who participated in the Constituent Legislature, because some of them have not been able to participate and seven of them have already died; among them the civil war hero Dolores Ibarruri. In their discussions they remember the reasons why they entered politics and analyze the evolution of the situation of women in Spain.

According to critics, "one of the most powerful moments of the documentary is a meeting between these veterans and a group of active politicians of different political parties such as former minister Carmen Alborch, Carmen Calvo or Bibiana Aído, deputy of the Canary Coalition, Ana Oramas, the deputy of the PP Sara Dueñas, the member of the General Council of the Judiciary Margarita Uría, Montserrat Surroca of CiU or Inés Sabanés de IU ".

== Participants ==
- Asunción Cruañes Molina
- Belén Landáburu González
- Soledad Becerril Bustamante
- María Dolores Calvet Puig
- Ana María Ruiz-Tagle
- Esther Tellado Alfonso
- Nona Inés Vilariño Salgado
- María Dolores Pelayo Duque
- Carlota Bustelo García del Leal
- Castro Garcia Virtues
- María Izquierdo Rojo
- Rosina Lajo Pérez
- Amalia Miranzo Martínez
- Mercedes Moll de Miguel

=== They could not participate ===
- Gloria Begué Cantón
- María Teresa Revilla López
- Immaculate Sabater Llorens
- Juana Arce Molina
- Elena María Moreno González

=== Those that are no longer alive ===
- Dolores Blanca Morenas Aydillo (1937-1998)
- Palmira Plá Pechovierto (1914-2007)
- Dolores Ibárruri Gómez (1895-1989)
- Marta Ángela Mata Garriga (1926-2006)
- Pilar Brabo Castells (1943-1993)
- María Victoria Fernández Spain and Fernández Latorre (1925-1999)
- Carmen García Bloise (1937-1994)
- Maria Rúbies i Garrofé (1932-1993)
