= Poker Face (2012 film) =

- Theatrical release poster
- Spanish: Impávido
- Directed by: Carlos Therón
- Screenplay by: Carlos Therón; Roberto Therón; Alfonso Aranda
- Produced by: Nacho Monge; Rafael Álvarez
- Starring: Julián Villagrán; Manolo Solo; Nacho Vidal; Carolina Bona; Selu Nieto; José Luis García Pérez; Marta Torné; Víctor Clavijo; Pepón Nieto; Pepo Oliva
- Cinematography: Antonio J. García
- Edited by: Carlos Therón
- Music by: Antonio Escobar
- Production companies: Mediagrama; Enigma Films
- Distributed by: Emon
- Release date: 27 July 2012
- Country: Spain
- Language: Spanish

Poker Face (Spanish: Impávido) is a 2012 Spanish comedy thriller film directed by Carlos Therón which stars Julián Villagrán.

== Plot ==
Car thief Rai loses a money stash owed to crime boss Mikima, thereby accepting a job offered by Manrique consisting on finding a woman named Nora, so he could get money and pay off the debt.

== Cast ==
- Julián Villagrán as Rai
- Manolo Solo as Tena
- Nacho Vidal as Mikima
- Carolina Bona as Dani
- Selu Nieto as Aaron
- José Luis García Pérez
- Marta Torné as Nora
- Víctor Clavijo as El Botas
- Pepón Nieto as Roge
- Pepo Oliva as Manrique
- Fernando Valdivieso as El Piercings

== Production ==
The film (Therón's sophomore feature) takes elements from Therón's 2007 short film of the same name and features several returning cast members. Therón claimed to have found inspiration in films such as Airbag (1997) and Snatch (2000). The film was produced by Mediagrama alongside Enigma Films. It was primarily shot in Gijón.

== Release ==
Distributed by Emon, it was released theatrically in Spain on 27 July 2012.

== Reception ==
Fausto Fernández of Fotogramas rated the film 3 out of 5 stars, considering that Villagrán nails "the anti-hero in love looking for redemption and second chances".

Irene Crespo of Cinemanía rated the film 2 out of 5 stars.

Jordi Costa of El País considered that even if it is difficult for the film to leave any indelible print on the viewer, it at least manages to deliver what it promises.

== See also ==
- List of Spanish films of 2012
