= Childish Games =

2012 film

- Theatrical release poster
- Spanish: Dictado
- Directed by: Antonio Chavarrías
- Written by: Antonio Chavarrías
- Produced by: Antonio Chavarrías
- Starring: Juan Diego Botto; Bárbara Lennie; Mágica Pérez
- Cinematography: Guillermo Granillo
- Production company: Oberon Cinematográfica
- Distributed by: Filmax
- Release dates: 11 February 2012 (Berlin); 9 March 2012 (Spain)
- Running time: 82 minutes
- Country: Spain
- Language: Spanish

Childish Games (Spanish: Dictado, also known as Dictation) is a 2012 Spanish horror film written and directed by Antonio Chavarrías which stars Juan Diego Botto, Bárbara Lennie and Mágica Pérez. The film competed at the 62nd Berlin International Film Festival in February 2012. It is an Oberon Cinematográfica production.

== Cast ==
- Bárbara Lennie as Laura
- Juan Diego Botto as Daniel
- Nora Navas as Beatriz
- Marc Rodríguez as Mario
- Àgata Roca as Luisa
- Cristina Azofra as Clara
- Mágica Pérez as Julia
- Monti Castiñeiras as Alfonso
- Maria Pau Pigem
- Celia Rico Clavellino as Canguro.

== Critics ==
The movie have mixed critics from websites as screen anarchy and Variety

== See also ==
- List of Spanish films of 2012
