= Unit 7 =

- Theatrical release poster
- Spanish: Grupo 7
- Directed by: Alberto Rodríguez
- Screenplay by: Rafael Cobos
- Story by: Rafael Cobos; Alberto Rodríguez
- Produced by: Gervasio Iglesias; José Antonio Félez
- Starring: Antonio de la Torre; Mario Casas; Joaquín Núñez; José Manuel Poga; Inma Cuesta; Estefanía de los Santos; Alfonso Sánchez; Carlos Olalla; Lucía Guerrero; Julián Villagrán
- Cinematography: Alex Catalán
- Edited by: José M. G. Moyano
- Music by: Julio de la Rosa
- Production companies: Atípica Films; La Zanfoña Producciones; Sacromonte Films
- Distributed by: Warner Bros. Pictures
- Release date: 4 April 2012
- Running time: 96 minutes
- Country: Spain
- Language: Spanish
- Budget: €3.5 million
- Box office: €2.4 million (Spain)

Unit 7 (Spanish: Grupo 7) is a 2012 Spanish crime drama-action thriller directed by Alberto Rodríguez. It was written by Rafael Cobos and Alberto Rodríguez and stars Antonio de la Torre and Mario Casas. The film was nominated for 16 Goya Awards.

== General description and themes ==
This atmospheric piece is set in Seville, Andalusia in the four years leading up to the 1992 Universal Exposition of Seville. It dramatizes the social changes experienced by the city in a major "before" and "after" the World Expo, honing in on the process of cleaning up the city, eliminating the drug dealing from the streets in preparation for the World Expo, from the point of view of four (and particularly two) police officers comprising the (fictitious) Unit 7, renowned for their exaggeratedly elevated drug bust rate.

The film discusses the concept of the end justifying the means, focusing on themes of corruption, police violence, the psychology behind the figures carrying it out, and the politics (embodied by the police chief and unseen politicians) giving them carte blanche to do so, while washing their hands of the dirty deeds, condemning their actions when scandals break and condoning them when major drug busts are successful. It also describes life in some of the (formerly) more sordid neighborhoods or slums of Seville, as well as the sense of community displayed by some of their inhabitants when they decide to fight back against. All of this is portrayed with the backdrop of the ginormous construction work being undertaken to build the World Expo grounds on the outskirts of the city, shown as an enormous, bulldozed wasteland with no construction ever being seen in action but rather idle machinery and only marginally built bridges and buildings.

It shows the police officers as people, where it is not so clear where right ends and wrong begins, people who are being both exceedingly brutal, and yet sometimes expressing great tenderness or love, and it shows how the group of four feeds from one another in an escalation of violence in the name of eliminating the drug scourge. The director states that the movie could also be seen as "the rise and fall of a band of gangsters, only our gangsters are on this side of the law".

== Plot ==
Unit 7 has a tough assignment: to clean the most dangerous drug trafficking networks out of the city and bring an end to the corrosive power that has taken hold of the streets. A detail of four, the unit is led by Ángel, a young officer aspiring to the rank of detective, and Rafael, a violent, arrogant, yet efficient cop.

But Unit 7's modus operandi is slipping outside the bounds of the law through their use of violence, coercion, lies and half-truths. For them, anything goes.

As they gain ground in their mission, the two officers head in opposite directions. Angel takes the path of ambition and police excess while Rafael will begin to change as a result of his feelings for beautiful, enigmatic Lucia.

== Cast ==
- Antonio de la Torre as Rafael
- Mario Casas as Ángel
- Joaquín Núñez as Mateo
- José Manuel Poga as Miguel
- Julián Villagrán as Joaquín
- Inma Cuesta as Elena
- Lucía Guerrero as Lucía
- Estefanía de los Santos as La Caoba
- Pedro Cervantes as Eulogio
- Alfonso Sánchez as Amador

== Production ==
The film was produced by Atípica Films, La Zanfoña and Sacromonte Films and it had the participation and support of Canal Sur Televisión, TVE, Canal+, AXN, Audiovisual SGR, Junta de Andalucía, ICO and ICAA.

== Release ==
Distributed by Warner Bros. Pictures Intl. España, the film was theatrically released in Spain on 4 April 2012.

It also screened on 20 April 2012 at the Tribeca Film Festival (TFF) in New York.

== Accolades ==
Year	Award	Category	Nominee(s)	Result	Ref.
2012	2012 Tribeca Film Festival	Best Cinematography - Special Jury Mention	Alex Catalán	Won	
2012	2012 Tribeca Film Festival	Best Narrative Feature	Alberto Rodríguez	Nominated	
2012	2012 Turia Awards	Special Award	Alberto Rodríguez	Won	
2012	Neox Fan Awards 2012	Best Spanish film		Nominated	
2012	Neox Fan Awards 2012	Best Spanish film actress	Inma Cuesta	Nominated	
2013	18th Forqué Awards	Best Film		Nominated	
2013	18th Forqué Awards	Best Actor	Antonio de la Torre	Nominated	
2013	68th CEC Medals	Best Film		Nominated	
2013	68th CEC Medals	Best Director	Alberto Rodríguez	Nominated	
2013	68th CEC Medals	Best Actor	Antonio de la Torre	Won	
2013	68th CEC Medals	Best Supporting Actor	Julián Villagrán	Won	
2013	68th CEC Medals	Best Original Screenplay	Alberto Rodríguez, Rafael Cobos	Nominated	
2013	68th CEC Medals	Best Cinematography	Alex Catalán	Nominated	
2013	68th CEC Medals	Best Editing	José M. G. Moyano	Nominated	
2013	68th CEC Medals	Best Score	Julio de la Rosa	Nominated	
2013	68th CEC Medals	Best New Actor	Joaquín Núñez	Won	
2013	68th CEC Medals	Best New Actress	Estefanía de los Santos	Nominated	
2013	27th Goya Awards	Best Film		Nominated	
2013	27th Goya Awards	Best Director	Alberto Rodríguez	Nominated	
2013	27th Goya Awards	Best Original Screenplay	Rafael Cobos and Alberto Rodríguez	Nominated	
2013	27th Goya Awards	Best Actor	Antonio de la Torre	Nominated	
2013	27th Goya Awards	Best Supporting Actor	Julián Villagrán	Won	
2013	27th Goya Awards	Best New Actor	Joaquín Núñez	Won	
2013	27th Goya Awards	Best New Actress	Estefanía de los Santos	Nominated	
2013	27th Goya Awards	Best Original Score	Julio de la Rosa	Nominated	
2013	27th Goya Awards	Best Production Supervision	Manuela Ocón	Nominated	
2013	27th Goya Awards	Best Cinematography	Álex Catalán	Nominated	
2013	27th Goya Awards	Best Art Direction	Pepe Domínguez del Olmo	Nominated	
2013	27th Goya Awards	Best Costume Design	Fernando García	Nominated	
2013	27th Goya Awards	Best Makeup and Hairstyles	Yolanda Piña	Nominated	
2013	27th Goya Awards	Best Editing	José M. G. Moyano	Nominated	
2013	27th Goya Awards	Best Sound	Daniel de Zayas Ramírez, Nacho Royo-Villanova, Pelayo Gutiérrez	Nominated	
2013	27th Goya Awards	Best Special Effects	Juan Ventura	Nominated	
2013	22nd Actors and Actresses Union Awards	Best Film Actor in a Leading Role	Antonio de la Torre	Won	
2013	22nd Actors and Actresses Union Awards	Best Film Actor in a Secondary Role	Julián Villagrán	Won	
2013	22nd Actors and Actresses Union Awards	Best Film Actor in a Minor Role	Alfonso Sánchez	Won	

== See also ==
- List of Spanish films of 2012
