= Julián Villagrán =

Spanish actor (born 1973)

- Villagrán in 2026
- Born: Julián Villagrán Aguilar; 24 May 1973 (age 53); Trebujena, Spain
- Occupation: Actor
- Years active: 1997-present
- Relatives: Aixa Villagrán (sister)

Julián Villagrán Aguilar (born 24 May 1973) is a Spanish actor. He appeared in more than sixty films and television programs since 1997.

== Biography ==
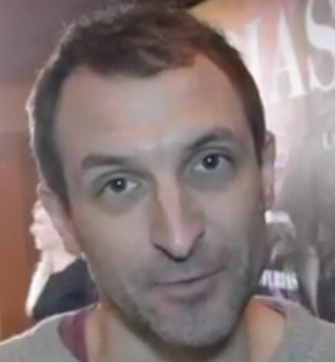
Villagrán in 2016

Julián Villagrán Aguilar was born in Trebujena, province of Cádiz on 24 May 1973. He was however raised in Seville. His sister Aixa has also pursued an acting career. He trained as an actor at Seville's CAT. He landed his feature film debut in La duquesa roja (1997).

== Selected filmography ==
=== Film ===
Year	Title	Role	Notes	Ref.
2003	Astronautas (Astronauts)	Andrés		
2004	Hipnos (Hypnos)	Ulloa		
2006	Cabeza de perro (Doghead)	Eduardo		
2007	Bajo las estrellas (Under the Stars)	Lalo		
2011	La cebra	Colonel		
2011	Extraterrestre (Extraterrestrial)	Julio		
2012	Impávido (Poker Face)	Rai		
2012	Grupo 7 (Unit 7)	Joaquín		
2014	Murieron por encima de sus posibilidades (Dying Beyond Their Means)	Julio		
2016	Gernika (Guernica)	Pierre		
2018	Cuando los ángeles duermen (When Angels Sleep)	Germán		
2018	Quién te cantará	Nicolás		
2021	Operación Camarón (Undercover Wedding Crashers)	Blas		
2023	Una vida no tan simple (Not Such an Easy Life)	Rascafría		
2023	Como Dios manda (How to Become a Modern Man)	Víctor		
2024	Tratamos demasiado bien a las mujeres (We Treat Women Too Well)	Julián		
2024	Mala persona (Mean Streak)	Juanjo		
2024	Desmontando a Lucía (Guilty Attraction)	Óliver		
2025	La buena hija (The Good Daughter)			
2026	Casi todo bien (Cool Books)	Toni		

=== Television ===
Year	Title	Role	Notes	Ref.
2015–20	El ministerio del tiempo	Diego Velázquez		
2018	Arde Madrid	Floren		
2025	Superestar (Superstar)	Arlequín		
2025	Ena. Queen Victoria Eugenia	Augusto Assía		

== Accolades ==
Year	Award	Category	Work	Result	Ref.
2008	22nd Goya Awards	Best Supporting Actor	Under the Stars	Nominated	
2009	18th Actors and Actresses Union Awards	Best Stage Actor in a Secondary Role	La taberna fantástica	Won	
2013	68th CEC Medals	Best Supporting Actor	Unit 7	Won	
2013	27th Goya Awards	Best Supporting Actor	Unit 7	Won	
2013	22nd Actors and Actresses Union Awards	Best Film Actor in a Secondary Role	Unit 7	Won	
2017	26th Actors and Actresses Union Awards	Best Television Actor in a Secondary Role	El ministerio del tiempo	Won	
2019	28th Actors and Actresses Union Awards	Best Television Actor in a Minor Role	Arde Madrid	Won	
2024	3rd Carmen Awards	Best Supporting Actor	How to Become a Modern Man	Nominated	
