= Maria Rúbies i Garrofé =

Maria Rúbies i Garrofé (November 21, 1932 in Camarasa, Noguera – January 14, 1993 in Lleida) was a teacher of Catalan politics. After the Spanish Civil War she settled in Os de Balaguer and afterwards in Lleida. She attended high school in Lleida and then graduated in 1957 with a degree in mathematics from the University of Barcelona.
