= Pilar Revuelta =

Spanish film set director

Pilar Revuelta is a Spanish Production designer, Art director and Set decorator based in Madrid. Along with production designer Eugenio Caballero, she won an Oscar for Best Achievement in Art Direction in 2007 for Film director Guillermo del Toro's movie Pan's Labyrinth. Revuelta and Caballero also received a BAFTA nomination for Production Design for Pan's Labyrinth.

Revuelta received a grant to study at the American Film Institute in Hollywood, CA. She is a member of the class of 1991 with a focus on Production Design.

She worked with Guillermo del Toro previously on The Devil's Backbone. She has worked with Pedro Almodóvar helping to achieve his trademark vivid color schemes in Bad Education (2004) and also worked with Juan Carlos Fresnadillo on his acclaimed first feature Intacto (2001).

== Filmography ==
=== Set Decorator ===
- Black Tears (1998)
- The Devil's Backbone (2001)
- Intacto (2001)
- The Shanghai Spell (2002)
- Mortadelo & Filemon: The Big Adventure (2003)
- Bad Education (2004)
- Pan's Labyrinth (2006)
- Che: Part One (2008)
- Che: Part Two (2008)
- Broken Embraces (2009)
- The Limits of Control (2009)
- The Impossible (2012)
- Exodus: Gods and Kings (2014)
- The Promise (2016)
- A Monster Calls (2016)

=== Art Department ===
- Two-Bits & Pepper (1995)
- El angel de la guarda (1996)
- Pon un hombre en tu vida (1996)
- La Buena Estrella (1997)
- Grandes Ocasiones (1998)
- El Bola (2000)
- Pan's Labyrinth (2006)
- Exodus: Gods and Kings (2014)

=== Art Director ===
- Two Over Easy ( 1994)
- Los lobos de Washington (1999)
- Kasbah (2000)
- The Weakness of the Bolshevik (2003)
- Ausentes (2005)

=== Production Designer ===
- Hotel Oasis (1995)
- Ausentes (2005)
- Shiver (2008)
- The Artist and the Model (2012)
- Living is Easy with Eyes Closed (2013)

== Awards ==
Year	Organization	Award	Result	Title	Ref
2006	Academy Awards	Best Achievement in Art Direction	Won	Pan's Labyrinth	
