= The Apostle (2012 film) =

2012 animated fantasy film

- Theatrical release poster
- Galician: O Apóstolo
- Directed by: Fernando Cortizo
- Screenplay by: Fernando Cortizo
- Music by: Xavier Font; Philip Glass; Arturo Vaquero
- Production company: Artefact Productions
- Distributed by: Film Arante; Coven Distribution
- Release date: 31 October 2012
- Running time: 84 minutes
- Country: Spain
- Languages: Spanish; Galician
- Budget: €5.2 million
- Box office: $59,810

The Apostle (Galician: O Apóstolo) is a 2012 Spanish adult stop-motion animated fantasy horror film written and directed by Fernando Cortizo (in his directorial debut). Produced by Artefact Productions, it stars Carlos Blanco Vila, Paul Naschy, Jorge Sanz, Geraldine Chaplin and Luis Tosar. It was the last film starring Naschy, who died in November 2009. Released in Spanish cinemas on 31 October 2012 by Film Arante and Coven Distribution, the critically acclaimed film received a limited theatrical release to qualify for Awards consideration.

== Plot ==
Two thieves, Ramon and Xavier, escape from prison. Xavier reveals that he stashed the jewels from a previous theft in the house of a woman named Luisa in the village of Xanaz. They split up—Xavier unwittingly re-enters the prison, while Ramon heads to Xanaz. There he finds several tourists and Xanaz's overly-welcoming inhabitants, including the priest, Don Cesareo. The villagers insist each visitor stay in a separate house and tell Ramon they'll show him Luisa's house in the morning.

Ramon is brought to the house of Dorinda, who idly mentions being "trapped" by Xanaz and tells him that Luisa is dead. She insists he drink hot milk to help him sleep; instead of sleeping, he locks her cat in his room and breaks into her attic. There he finds the belongings of people he assumes the villagers robbed. He then spies Dorinda and other villagers heading to the church, but when he follows, the building is empty. He steals a few valuables, including a golden medal, then mysteriously collapses.

Elsewhere, the vain and materialistic Archpriest of Santiago and his humble assistant Pablo make their own way to Xanaz. The Archpriest was due to receive the Medal of the Apostle, a golden medal blessed by the pope, but it didn't arrive on time. He believes it went missing along the pilgrimage route.

Ramon wakes in the morning to find the village strangely hostile. Dorinda accuses him of killing her cat and the villagers drive him away. He falls asleep in the woods and dreams of Cesareo and Dorinda celebrating amid a hoard of treasure.

Waking after dark, he returns to the village and almost reaches Luisa's house before Cesareo finds him. The priest apologises and forcefully invites Ramon to his house for a lavish meal, including a special wine. Ramon pretends to drink, then sneaks out to Luisa's house and recovers the jewels. His escape is interrupted by an entranced man parading through Xanaz holding a large cross—a supernatural force compels Ramon to take the cross, and the other man flees.

The next day, the other man returns and explains Ramon's predicament: he's cursed to lead the Holy Company, a nocturnal parade of lost souls. The leader spends each night in a trance carrying the Company's cross and guiding them to people who are about to die. The man tells Ramon he only has two nights left before the curse kills him unless he can pass on the cross. Ramon spends the second night leading the Company as it kills tourists in Xanaz, each of whom is sleeping in a villager's bed while the villagers themselves are away.

On the third day, an increasingly weak Ramon sneaks into Cesareo's house and discovers the cause of the curse in the priest's journal: long ago, a sick pilgrim passed through Xanaz with his wife, Dorinda, in search of a cure for the plague. The villagers discovered his illness and fearfully burned him alive. In return, he cursed the villagers to be sent to hell by the Holy Company. The now-immortal villagers survived by drugging pilgrims and leaving them for the Company to kill instead, while they hid in the church. When they lacked pilgrims, they sacrificed their own, such as Luisa.

The Archpriest and Pablo arrive at Xanaz as the villagers capture Ramon. They pretend he's mad and insist the visitors stay overnight. Ramon desperately explains the truth to Pablo, who rescues the Archpriest and several tourists while Ramon leads the Company on his final night. Now unable to find victims in the villagers' houses, the Company enters the church, finds the hidden villagers, and kills them. The Archpriest sees that Ramon has the Medal of the Apostle and confronts him, inadvertently receiving the Company's cross and curse, freeing Ramon. The Archpriest is not seen again.

Changed by his experiences, Ramon leaves the stolen jewels with Pablo.

== Voice cast ==
The Spanish voice cast is as follows:

- Carlos Blanco Vila as Ramon
- Paul Naschy as the Archpriest of Santiago
- Jorge Sanz as Pablo
- Geraldine Chaplin as Dorinda
- Luis Tosar as Xavier
- Xosé Manuel Olveira as Don Cesareo
- Celso Bugallo as Celso
- Manuel Manquiña as Atilano
- Isabel Blanco as Pilgrim

== Production ==
Production began in 2008. With a budget of €5.2 million, The Apostle was partially crowdfunded by 560 backers. It was filmed in stereoscopic stop-motion using clay animation being the first one made in Europe. Written and directed by Fernando Cortizo, the film was Cortizo's directorial debut. The cinematography was handled by Matthew Hazelrig, and the film was edited by Fernando Alfonsin. The soundtrack was composed by Xavier Font, Philip Glass and Arturo Vaquero, and released by Orange Mountain Music.

== Release ==
=== Box office ===
The Apostle was released theatrically in Spain on 31 October 2012. Although a release of 80 theatres was originally agreed upon by distributors Film Arante and Coven Distribution, The Apostle would ultimately be released in only thirteen theatres following various setbacks. A box office flop, the film grossed $17,061 in its opening weekend for a total box office gross of $59,810 during its entire theatrical run. The financial loss was so substantial that it brought Artefact Productions to the brink of bankruptcy. After the disappointing release, director Cortizo told Fotogramas "in Spain, I will never make a film again. I have wasted 3 years of my life for nothing, and the efforts of many people have been wasted."

=== Home media ===
In November 2014, The Apostle was released on its official website by Artefact Productions at a cost of €1.5 for a 24-hour renting period. Multiple subtitled versions were also available, including English. The DVD was priced at €10. Due to Artefact Productions's previous interactions with Film Arante and Coven Distribution, they do not intend to sell the film to a video streaming service or DVD distributor, rather selling online via their official website.

=== Accolades ===
At the 27th Goya Awards, The Apostle was nominated for Best Animated Film, but lost to Tad, The Lost Explorer.
