= The Wild Ones (film) =

- promotional poster
- Catalan: Els Nens Salvatges
- Spanish: Los Niños Salvajes
- Directed by: Patricia Ferreira
- Written by: Patricia Ferreira; Virginia Yagüe
- Starring: Marina Comas; Àlex Monner; Albert Baró
- Cinematography: Sergi Gallardo
- Edited by: Antonio Frutos
- Music by: Pablo Cervantes
- Production companies: Distinto Films; Televisió de Catalunya; Áralan Films S.L.
- Release date: April 2012 (Malága)
- Running time: 100 minutes
- Country: Spain
- Languages: Catalan; Spanish

The Wild Ones (Catalan: Els Nens Salvatges; Spanish: Los Niños Salvajes) is a 2012 Spanish drama film directed by Patricia Ferreira.

The film premiered at the 2012 Málaga Film Festival where it won Best Picture. The film was nominated for three Goya Awards (Best New Actor, Best New Actress and Best Original Song).

== Plot ==
Álex, Gabi and Oki, three teenagers who live in a big city, are completely unknown for their parents, for their teachers and for themselves. Their emotional isolation, taken to the limit have unexpected and dire consequences that will shake the society.

== Cast ==
- Marina Comas - Oki
- Àlex Monner - Àlex
- Albert Baró - Gabi
- Aina Clotet - Júlia
- Ana Fernández - Rosa
- José Luis García Pérez - Luis
- Montse Germán - Elisa
- Francesc Orella - Àngel
- Marisol Membrillo - Raquel
- Clara Segura - Laura
- Emma Vilarasau - Dir. institut
- Lluís Villanueva - Jesús
- Eduardo Velasco - Antonio
- Mercè Pons - Interrogadora

== Accolades ==
List of awards and nominations
Award	Category	Nominee	Result
2012 Málaga Film Festival	Best Picture		Won
2012 Málaga Film Festival	Best Supporting Actress	Aina Clotet	Won
2012 Málaga Film Festival	Best Supporting Actor	Álex Monner	Won
2012 Málaga Film Festival	Best Screenplay	Patricia Ferreira and Virginia Yagüe	Won
27th Goya Awards	Best New Actress	Cati Solivellas	Lost
27th Goya Awards	Best New Actor	Àlex Monner	Lost
27th Goya Awards	Best Original Song	Víctor M. Peinado, Pablo Cervantes Gutiérrez and Pablo José Fernández Brenes	Lost
