= María Belón =

Spanish physician (born 1966)

- Born: 1966 (age 59–60); Madrid, Spain
- Occupations: Spokesperson; advocate
- Known for: Surviving the 2004 Indian Ocean earthquake and tsunami
- Spouse: Enrique Álvarez
- Children: 3

María Belón (born 1966) is a Spanish physician and motivational speaker, best known for surviving the 2004 Indian Ocean earthquake and tsunami when she was on holiday in Thailand with her husband Enrique (Quique) Álvarez and three sons Lucas, Simón, and Tomás. She was severely injured during the tsunami and nearly died.

She was portrayed in the 2012 film The Impossible by Naomi Watts (with the name changed to Bennett), who was nominated for the Academy Award for Best Actress for her performance. The family's nationality was unspecified in the film.

== Depiction in media ==
Belón is credited in the cast of the 2012 film The Impossible for providing her story and working on the set in Thailand in the same locations as the original tsunami. Belón was delighted with the selection of Naomi Watts to play her in the film, stating that Watts was her favorite actress after seeing the film 21 Grams. She worked with screenwriter Sergio G. Sánchez to ensure her story was accurately told.

Belón has appeared on numerous television shows, including Charlie Rose and The View, discussing her experience of making the film and her family's experience of the tsunami. She has been outspoken regarding the fact that her story of survival is not the only one, and that she is only one of many who suffered and survived. She now works as an advocate for those still recovering from the effects of the tsunami. She has said of her experience,

The tsunami was an incredible gift. I embrace life. My whole life is extra time. There is no difference between me—a Spanish woman named María who is alive—and thousands of moms who are under the sea. I do not deserve to be alive, but life is not fair. I feel pain and compassion for so many others who didn't come back up or lost the ones they love. My whole story is on my body. And it is wonderful because it means I am alive.

== Advocacy ==
Since her recovery, Belón has become an international advocate for tsunami survivors and resilience in the face of trauma. She gives motivational talks about her experience during the 2004 tsunami and her two-year recovery process following severe injuries.

In 2013 she was a guest lecturer at the Instituto de Cervantes in Gibraltar. In 2015, she was the Spotlight Guest Speaker at the Share Iuvare Business Convention and also spoke at the World Business Forum, addressing themes of perseverance, family, and post-traumatic growth.

Her story, which took place in Khao Lak, Thailand, one of the hardest-hit areas in the 2004 disaster, has often been referenced in broader discussions about the international response, such as Operation Unified Assistance, and the long-term psychological impact on survivors featured in tsunami-related research and survivor networks.

== Personal life ==
She studied to be a physician and also previously worked as a professor of management with the ESADE Business School, and as a business consultant for companies like Pepsi. She has stated that some of her family is from the Canary Islands.
