= Fernando Marías =

Spanish writer (1958–2022)

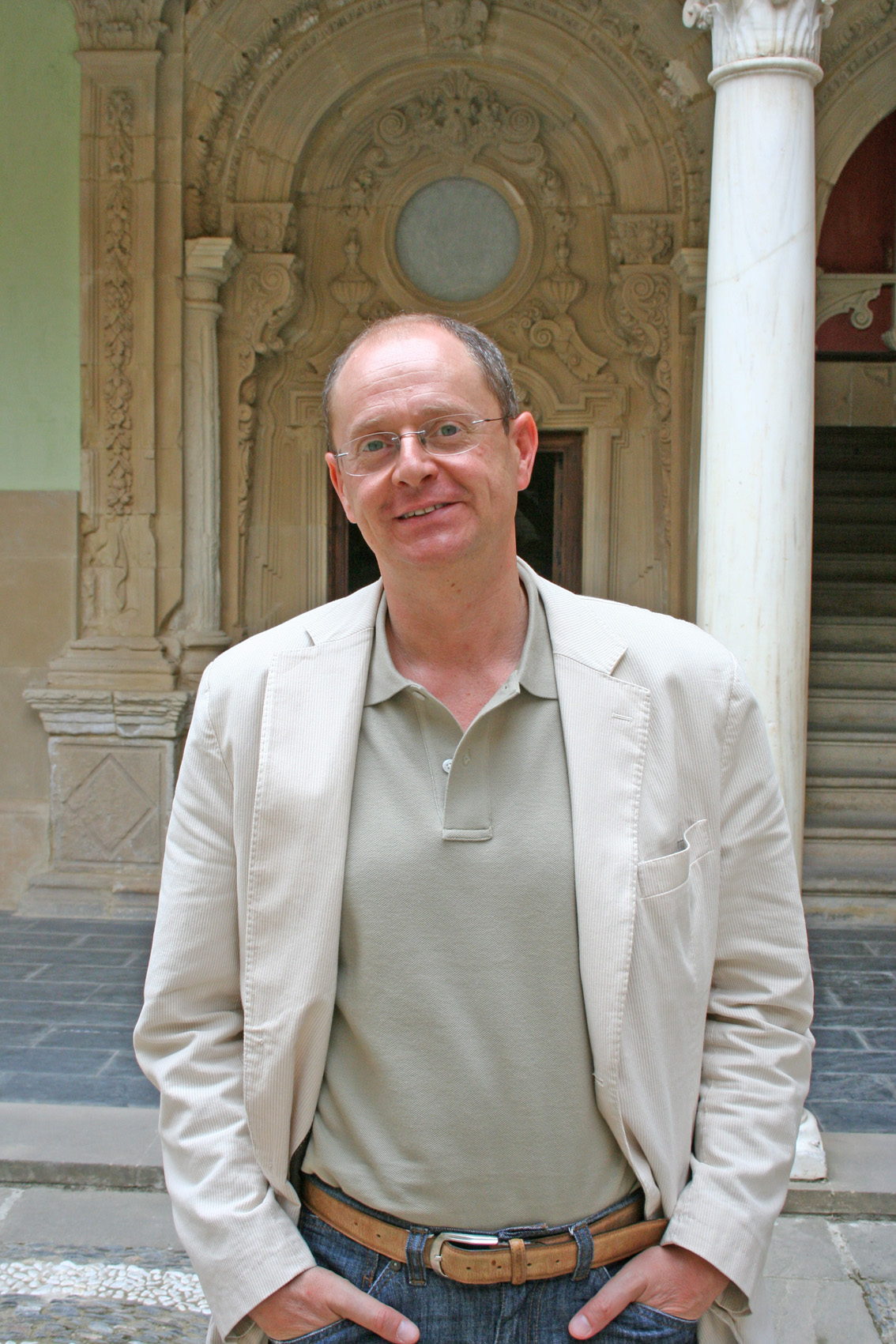
- Marías in 2007
- Born: Fernando Marías Amondo; 13 June 1958; Bilbao, Spain
- Died: 5 February 2022 (age 63); Madrid, Spain
- Occupations: Novelist; screenwriter

Fernando Marías Amondo (13 June 1958 – 5 February 2022) was a Spanish writer.

== Biography ==
Born on 13 June 1958 in Bilbao, Biscay, Marías moved to Madrid in 1975 to study cinema at the university. His debut novel (which he later adapted to a feature film screenplay for The End of a Mystery) was published in 1990. He won the 2001 Premio Nadal for El niño de los coroneles. He died in Madrid on 5 February 2022, at the age of 63.

== Works ==
Novels

- La luz prodigiosa (1990)
- Esta noche moriré (1992)
- El niño de los coroneles (2001)
- Invasor (2003)
- La mujer de las alas grises (2003)
- El mundo se acaba todos los días (2005)
- Cielo abajo (2005)
- Zara y el librero de Bagdad (2008)
- Todo el amor y casi toda la muerte (2010)
- La isla del padre (2015)
- Arde este libro (2021)
