= Ana Piterbarg =

Argentine film director and screenwriter

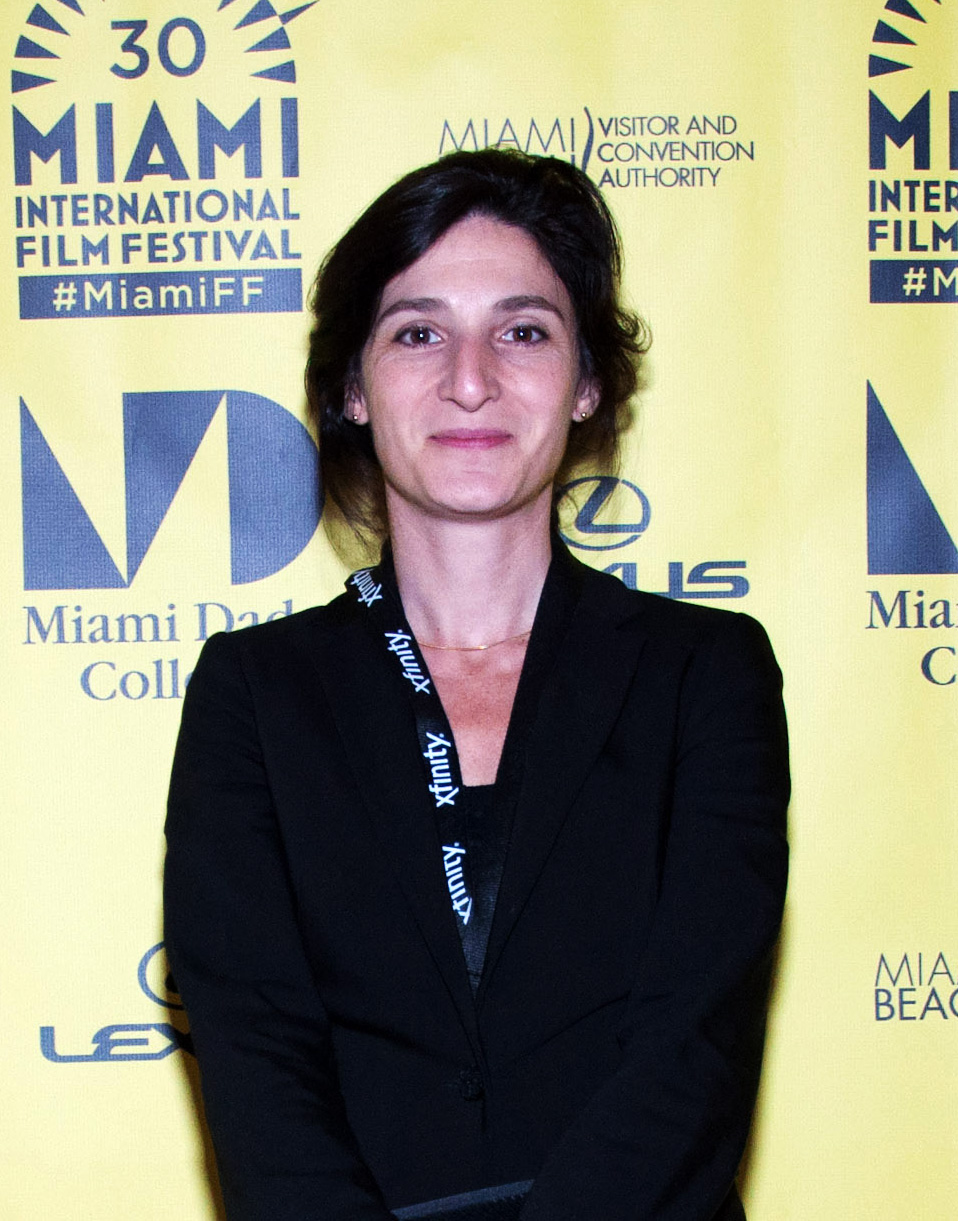
Piterbarg at the 2013 Miami International Film Festival presentation of Everybody Has a Plan at Regal South Beach on March 2nd 2013

Ana Piterbarg is an Argentine film director and screenwriter best known for her 2012 thriller Everybody Has a Plan.

== Career ==
Piterbarg had the idea to approach actor Viggo Mortensen to star in Everybody Has a Plan but was unable to reach him through his agents. Upon meeting him randomly in Buenos Aires while picking her son up from swimming lessons she pitched her film to Mortensen who eventually agreed to not only star in the film but produce it as well. The film premiered at the 2012 Toronto International Film Festival.

In 2014 Piterbarg announced her follow-up to Everybody Has a Plan would be a black and white experimental film titled Alptraum about a playwright descending into paranoia who is haunted by a krampus.
