= Estefanía de los Santos =

Spanish actress

- Born: Estefanía de los Santos Rúa; 1976; Seville, Spain
- Occupation: Actress
- Years active: 2003-present

Estefanía de los Santos (Seville, 1976) is a Spanish actress who has participated in several national fiction and feature films such as Bienvenidos al Lolita, Perdóname, Señor, El Continental or La peste. In 2012 she was nominated for a Goya Award for her performance in the feature film Grupo 7.

== Career ==
She participated for the first time in a television fiction in 2007, in the Antena 3 comedy for YouTube Chica busca chica. In 2010, she participated in the film Don Mendo Rock ¿La venganza?, but she would achieve greater popularity after starring in the feature film Grupo 7 (2012) by Alberto Rodríguez Librero, a performance for which she was nominated for the Goya Awards as best new actress.

In 2013, she joined the second season of the Antena 3 series Luna, el misterio de Calenda, where she played Marcela. In 2014, she was one of the protagonists of the series Bienvenidos al Lolita. That same year, she participated in the film Carmina y amén.

In 2017, she joined the main cast of the Telecinco series Perdóname, Señor. A year later, she also joined as the main character in Divinity's daily series Yo quisiera. That year, she was one of the protagonists of the web series Cúpido of Playz and the series broadcast on TVE El Continental, where she played Gloria. She also starred in the feature film Jaulas by Nicolás Pacheco for which she won the ASECAN award.

In 2019, she starred in Frank Ariza's feature film ¡Ay, mi madre!. She also participated in the Telecinco political series Secretos de Estado and joined the main cast of the Movistar+ series La peste. In 2020, she starred in the film Para toda la muerte and participated in the Mexican series Herederos por accidente.

In 2021, she participated in the feature film Ama, playing Rosario and starred in Vicente Villanueva's comedy Sevillanas de Brooklyn, where she played Carmen. She also began shooting the film Tras el reflejo, directed by Frank Ariza.

== Filmography ==
=== Film ===
Year	Title	Character	Directed by
2010	Dispongo de barcos	Sales assistant	Juan Cavestany
2010	Don Mendo Rock ¿La venganza?	Dulce	José Luis García Sánchez
2012	Grupo 7	La Caoba	Alberto Rodríguez Librero
2012	Miel de naranjas	Ticket agent	Imanol Uribe
2014	Carmina y amén	Fany	Paco León
2015	Hablar	The Drunkard	Joaquín Oristrell
2015	De chica en chica	Linda	Sonia Sebastián
2016	Que Dios nos perdone	Crossdresser	Rodrigo Sorogoyen
2016	Relaxing cup of coffee	Lola	José Semprún
2018	Tiempo después	Woman Mayor	José Luis Cuerda
2018	Jaulas	Concha	Nicolás Pacheco
2019	¡Ay, mi madre!	María	Frank Ariza
2020	Para toda la muerte	Pepa	Alfonso Sánchez Fernández
2021	Ama	Rosario	Júlia de Paz
2021	Sevillanas de Brooklyn	Carmen	Vicente Villanueva
2021	Las leyes de la frontera	Merche	Daniel Monzón
2022	La mesita del comedor	María	Caye Casas

=== Television ===
Year	Title	Channel	Character	Duration
2008 - 2009	Chica busca chica	YouTube	Alicia	3 episodios
2011	Cheers	Telecinco	Beatriz	1 episodio
2011	Estudio 1	La 1	Various Characters	1 episodio
2011	Marco	Antena 3	Juanota	1 episodio
2013	Luna, el misterio de Calenda	Antena 3	Marcela	8 episodios
2014	Bienvenidos al Lolita	Antena 3	Rosario «Charo» Martín	8 episodios
2017	Perdóname, Señor	Telecinco	Antonia Camacho	8 episodios
2018	Yo quisiera	Divinity	Hannah	38 episodios
2018	Cupido	Playz	Invidia	6 episodios
2018	El Continental	La 1	Gloria	10 episodios
2018	Arde Madrid	Movistar+	Campera	1 episodio
2018 - 2019	La peste	Movistar+	María de la O	7 episodios
2019	Secretos de estado	Telecinco	Francisca «Paca»	5 episodios
2020	Herederos por accidente	Claro Video	Pilar	13 episodios

== Awards and nominations ==
Year	Award	Category	Film	Result
2013	68th CEC Awards	Best New Actress	Grupo 7	Nominated
2013	Goya Awards	Best new actress	Grupo 7	Nominated
2013	Andalusian Film Award (ASECAN)	Best female performance	Grupo 7	Nominated
2015	Spanish Actors Union Awards	Best Supporting Actress in a Dramatic Role	Siempre me resistí a que terminara el verano	Nominated
2016	Spanish Actors Union Awards	Best Supporting Actress in a Dramatic Role	La distancia	Won
2019	Andalusian Film Award (ASECAN)	Best female performance	Jaulas	Won
