= Carmina or Blow Up =

- Spanish film logo
- Directed by: Paco León
- Written by: Paco León
- Starring: Carmina Barrios; María León; Paco Casaus; Ana Mª García
- Release date: July 5, 2012 (Spain)
- Running time: 70 minutes
- Country: Spain
- Language: Spanish
- Budget: 40.000 €

Carmina or Blow Up (Spanish: Carmina o revienta) is a Spanish comedy-drama film, directed and written by Paco León. The film stars his mother Carmina Barrios (Carmina), his sister, María León (María), Paco Casaus (Antonio León) and Ana Mª García (Ani). It is the first Spanish film released in cinemas, online and as a digital copy at the same time.

== Plot ==
Carmina is a 58-year-old woman who runs an inn in Seville. After being robbed several times, she comes up with an original way to get the money back and provide for her family. While she waits the outcome of her plan in her kitchen, she reflects on her life, work and miracles. She has two children, including María, a 22-year-old without a clear future ahead of her and a 4-year-old granddaughter, Marina.

Carmina herself lives with her husband, Antonio, a man who retains a fondness for alcohol, against his doctor's advice. In her inn she has a strange assistant named Basilio. She also has a friend who likes telling her about her experiences with celebrities, which are patently lies.

== Reception ==
The film has enjoyed good reviews, many of which praise its innovative, simultaneous release (at movie theaters, online, and on DVD).

== Awards and nominations ==
| Year | Award | Category | Result |
|---|---|---|---|
| 2012 | Málaga Film Festival | Best Film: Special Jury Prize | Won |
| 2012 | Málaga Film Festival | Best Film: Audience Award | Won |
| 2012 | Málaga Film Festival | Best Actress (Carmina Barrios) | Won |
| 2013 | Goya | Best New Director (Paco León) | Nominated |
| 2013 | Goya | Best Supporting Actress (María León) | Nominated |
| 2013 | Goya | Best New Actress (Carmina Barrios) | Nominated |
