= The End (2012 film) =

2012 film

- Theatrical release poster
- Spanish: Fin
- Directed by: Jorge Torregrossa
- Screenplay by: Sergio G. Sánchez; Jorge Guerricaechevarría
- Based on: Fin by David Monteagudo
- Produced by: Belén Atienza; Fernando Bovaira; Mercedes Gamero; Enrique López Lavigne; Mikel Lejarza
- Starring: Maribel Verdú; Daniel Grao; Carmen Ruiz; Miquel Fernández; Blanca Romero; Antonio Garrido; Clara Lago; Andrés Velencoso
- Cinematography: José David Montero
- Edited by: Carolina Martínez Urbina
- Music by: Lucia Godoy
- Production companies: MOD Producciones; Apache Films; Antena 3 Films; Misent Producciones
- Distributed by: Sony Pictures
- Release dates: 8 September 2012 (TIFF); 23 November 2012 (Spain)
- Running time: 90 minutes
- Country: Spain
- Language: Spanish

The End (Spanish: Fin) is a 2012 Spanish thriller film directed by Jorge Torregrossa and based on David Monteagudo's novel Fin, with a screenplay by Sergio G. Sánchez and Jorge Guerricaechevarría. The film is a MOD Producciones, Apaches Entertainment, Antena 3 Films and Misent Producciones production. It was first screened at the 2012 Toronto International Film Festival in September and later opened in Spain on 23 November of the same year. The film also marks the screen debut of model Andrés Velencoso.

== Plot ==
Félix, a man in his late 30s, is invited to a weekend reunion with a group of old friends at a remote mountain cabin owned by his friend Sergio. The gathering marks 20 years since their last meeting. Before departing, Félix encounters a disheveled man in the subway carrying cryptic drawings, though he fails to recognize him as Ángel, a former friend. Accompanied by his new girlfriend Eva, Félix drives to the cabin, evading her questions about Ángel.

Upon arrival, Eva is introduced to Sergio; his tense, secretive wife Sara; Rafa, a failed businessman; Maribel, Félix's ex-girlfriend; Hugo, a womanizing playboy; and Hugo's wife Cova. As the group reminisces, underlying tensions surface. Sara grows increasingly agitated over Ángel's absence, eventually confessing that he orchestrated the reunion, unsettling the others. That night, Eva rebuffs Hugo's advances, witnessed by Cova, while drunken arguments reveal a dark secret: during their last meeting two decades prior, the group forcibly drugged Ángel, triggering a psychotic break that led to his institutionalization.

At midnight, a blinding flash illuminates the sky, accompanied by a seismic rumble. All electronics fail, clocks freeze at 12:20 a.m., and communication with the outside world ceases. The next morning, the group discovers neighboring farms and a hikers’ campsite abandoned, with no trace of inhabitants except scavenging animals. They deduce a global phenomenon is erasing humans, sparing animals, which now behave erratically.

Descending the mountain, they traverse a cliffside path where panicked goats stampede, nearly killing Hugo. After rescuing him, they realize Cova has vanished. Further down, they find Ángel's wrecked truck in a gorge; his corpse reveals he died hours before the flash, suggesting the event only affects the living. Félix retrieves Ángel's sketchbook, filled with prophetic images of their ordeal.

Hugo later disappears during a swim, leaving Félix, Eva, Sara, and Maribel to continue. At a deserted caravan park, they flee rabid dogs on bicycles, but Sara vanishes mid-pursuit. The survivors encounter a crashed passenger jet with no crew or passengers, confirming the phenomenon's global scale.

Reaching a coastal town, they find it abandoned. In a church, Félix confesses to Maribel that Ángel's sketches foretold their fates, with only himself and Maribel depicted in the final scenes. A child's cry leads them to a girl fleeing an escaped circus lion. Cornered at a marina, the girl disappears, and Maribel—grieving her own lost children—sacrifices herself to the lion.

Félix and Eva escape on a yacht, where he reveals Ángel's final sketch page, implying only Eva survives. They sleep expecting Félix's disappearance, but both awaken the next morning. The film concludes ambiguously as their boat sails into a luminous mist, leaving their survival uncertain.

== Cast ==
- Miquel Fernández as Sergio
- Antonio Garrido as Rafa
- Daniel Grao as Félix
- Clara Lago as Eva
- Eugenio Mira as Ángel "The Prophet"
- Blanca Romero as Cova
- Carmen Ruiz as Sara
- Andrés Velencoso as Hugo
- Maribel Verdú as Maribel

== See also ==
- List of Spanish films of 2012
