= The Impossible (2012 film) =

2012 English-language Spanish film

- Theatrical release poster
- Directed by: J. A. Bayona
- Screenplay by: Sergio G. Sánchez
- Story by: María Belón
- Produced by: Álvaro Augustin; Belén Atienza; Enrique López Lavigne
- Starring: Naomi Watts; Ewan McGregor; Tom Holland
- Cinematography: Óscar Faura
- Edited by: Elena Ruiz; Bernat Vilaplana
- Music by: Fernando Velázquez
- Production companies: Apaches Entertainment; Telecinco Cinema
- Distributed by: Warner Bros. Pictures
- Release dates: 9 September 2012 (TIFF); 11 October 2012 (Spain)
- Running time: 113 minutes
- Country: Spain
- Language: English
- Budget: $45 million
- Box office: $198.1 million

The Impossible (Spanish: Lo imposible) is a 2012 English-language Spanish biographical disaster drama film directed by J. A. Bayona and written by Sergio G. Sánchez. Based on the experience of María Belón and her family in the 2004 Indian Ocean tsunami, the film features an international cast including Naomi Watts, Ewan McGregor and Tom Holland in his live-action film debut.

The film premiered at TIFF on 9 September 2012 and was released on 11 October in Spain. It received positive reviews from critics for its direction and acting, winning Best Director, Editing, Production Supervision, Sound, and Special Effects at the 27th Goya Awards. For her work in the film, Watts was nominated for the Academy Award for Best Actress, the Golden Globe Award for Best Actress – Motion Picture Drama and the Screen Actors Guild Award for Outstanding Performance by a Female Actor in a Leading Role.

== Plot ==
In December 2004, Dr. Maria Bennett, her husband Henry, and their three sons — Lucas, Thomas, and Simon — go on holiday to Khao Lak, Thailand. Arriving on Christmas Eve, they settle in and begin to enjoy the new Orchid Beach Resort. Two days later, the Indian Ocean tsunami inundates the area. Maria and Lucas manage to survive the deluge by clinging to debris, though Maria sustains serious injuries to her leg and chest. They help a toddler, Daniel, and are soon found by locals who transfer them to a hospital in the city of Takua Pa. Daniel is separated from them during the journey. At the hospital, Maria encourages Lucas to help others find their family members while she goes into surgery.

Meanwhile, Henry and the two younger boys have also survived and are together. Henry leaves Simon and Thomas with another family who are then taken to the mountains for safety by local relief crews. Henry stays behind to search for Maria and Lucas in the rubble. While out looking, injured and alone, he is picked up by a passer-by and driven to a nearby bus station with other survivors.

Communication facilities are scarce but a German tourist named Karl, who has also been separated from his family, lends Henry his cell phone. Henry calls Maria's father and promises him that he will look everywhere for Maria and Lucas. Karl volunteers to accompany Henry in his search and to look for his own family, who were at the beach when the tsunami hit.

While Maria is in surgery, her medical chart is mixed up with that of a woman named Muriel Barnes, who has died. Lucas returns to find his mother's bed empty and is then taken to a tent where children without families are kept safe. He assumes his mother is dead and is devastated by that. The mistake is discovered when Lucas cannot identify any of the dead woman's jewelry and he is subsequently reunited with his mother, who had been moved to a private room in the ICU. While he waits in the hospital, Lucas sees Daniel, who has been reunited with his father. Henry and Karl search for their families in various places before they arrive at the hospital, where Henry is given five minutes to look. Karl gives him a piece of paper with the names of his family members.

A vehicle carrying Simon and Thomas also stops outside the hospital and the boys get off so Simon can urinate. From a distance, Lucas recognizes his father and while searching for him in the chaotic crowd outside, Lucas's brothers spot him and they reunite. Henry finds the three of them together. He learns that Maria remains in the hospital, ready to undergo more surgery for her leg. As the anesthesia puts her to sleep, Maria experiences flashbacks of how she came to be injured and how she surfaced the water. While she is in surgery, Lucas tells Henry he has something really important to tell Maria.

The following day, the family boards an ambulance airplane to Singapore so Maria may receive further medical treatment. On the plane, Lucas tells his mother that he saw Daniel reunited with his father at the hospital. Maria looks out the window and cries quietly at the devastation below them.

== Cast ==
- Naomi Watts as Maria Bennett
- Ewan McGregor as Henry Bennett
- Tom Holland as Lucas, the twelve-year-old son
- Samuel Joslin as Thomas, the seven-and-a-half-year-old son
- Oaklee Pendergast as Simon, the five-year-old son
- Marta Etura as Simone
- Sönke Möhring as Karl Schweber
- Geraldine Chaplin as an old woman
- Johan Sundberg as Daniel

== Production ==
The Impossible was a co-production of Spanish film companies Apaches Entertainment and Telecinco Cinema. It employed much of the crew from The Orphanage, including its director, writer, production manager, cinematographer, composer, and editor. It was filmed in the Ciudad de la Luz studio in Alicante (Spain) and in Thailand. Principal photography began 23 August 2010 in Alicante and continued in October in Thailand.

To create a universal film in which nationality was irrelevant to the plot, director Juan Antonio Bayona decided not to specify the nationalities of the main characters.

The tsunami was recreated with a mixture of digital effects and real water. Real water surges were filmed in slow motion in a water tank in Spain using miniatures that were destroyed by a huge wave. Bayona committed to working with real water rather than a computer-generated wave because he wanted the story to be authentic. This meant Watts and Holland spent five weeks filming physically and psychologically demanding scenes in a massive water tank. Holland, aged 14 at the time of filming, later described it as a "scary environment... You can imagine how tiring and brutal that was."

== Release ==
Warner Bros. Pictures released the film in Spain on 11 October 2012. The United States distribution rights were pre-bought by Summit Entertainment. A teaser trailer was released on 26 December 2011. After a full-length English language trailer was released on 20 August 2012, a United States release date of 21 December 2012 was confirmed by Summit. It was released on 11 October 2012 in Spain and in Ireland and the United Kingdom on 1 January 2013. The film was released in the United States on 4 January 2013 and was made available by Summit Entertainment through a website streaming the film to members of SAG-AFTRA for consideration of the SAG awards.

=== Home media ===
The film was released on DVD/Blu-ray in the United States and Canada on Tuesday, 19 March 2013, with a European release 13 May 2013.

== Reception ==
=== Box office ===
The Impossible was a financial success. In Spain the film was released on 11 October 2012, and opened in 638 cinemas, grossing $11,569,306 on its opening weekend, ranking number one with a per-cinema average of $18,134, the highest-grossing opening weekend for a film in Spain. On its second weekend the film remained at number one and grossed $9,016,065 with a per-cinema average of $14,022. It spent a third weekend at number one with $5,768,184 and a per-cinema average of $9,098. The film ended up grossing $54,536,668 at the Spanish box office to become the highest grossing Spanish film of all time and $198,087,212 worldwide, compared with its estimated $45 million production budget.

=== Critical response ===
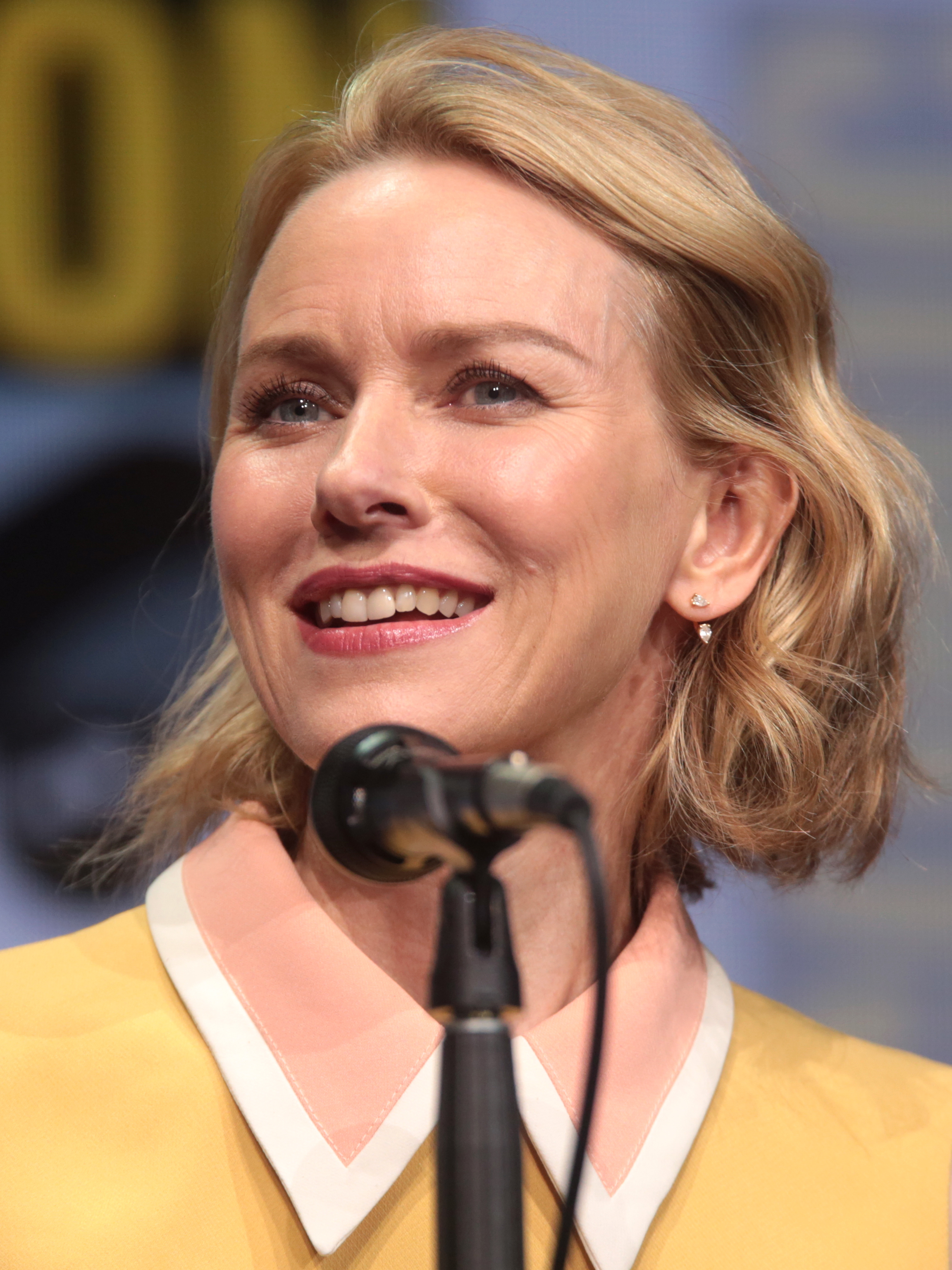
Naomi Watts' performance garnered critical acclaim and she received her second Academy Award nomination and her first Golden Globe nomination.

On the review aggregator website Rotten Tomatoes, 82% of 206 critics' reviews are positive, with an average rating of 7.3/10. The website's consensus reads: "The screenplay isn't quite as powerful as the direction or the acting, but with such an astonishing real-life story at its center, The Impossible is never less than compelling." At Metacritic, which assigns a weighted mean rating to reviews, the film had an average score of 73 out of 100, based on 42 critics, indicating "generally favourable reviews".

Roger Ebert of the Chicago Sun-Times gave a perfect four-star rating, praising the performances of Watts and McGregor, and the direction of Bayona. He called it "one of the best films of the year".

Deborah Young of The Hollywood Reporter gave a very positive review, praising the performances of the two leading stars, stating that "Watts packs a huge charge of emotion as the battered, ever-weakening Maria whose tears of pain and fear never appear fake or idealised. McGregor, cut and streaked with excessive blood he seems too distraught to wash away, keeps the tension razor-sharp as he pursues his family in a vast, shattered landscape." About the film she added, "The Impossible is one of the most emotionally realistic disaster movies in recent memory – and certainly one of the most frightening in its epic re-creation of the catastrophic 2004 Indian Ocean tsunami."

Justin Chang of Variety magazine gave a positive review, praising Bayona's directing and Sánchez's writing: "Collaborating again after their impressive 2007 debut feature, The Orphanage, Bayona and Sanchez get many things right here, starting with their decision to eschew a more panoramic view of the disaster to follow one family's journey from start to finish." About the performances of the main cast members he added, "Watts has few equals at conveying physical and emotional extremes, something she again demonstrates in a mostly bedridden role, and McGregor, in one of his better recent performances, manages to turn a simple phone call home into a small aria of heartbreak. Holland, in his live-action bigscreen debut, is wonderful as a kind, somewhat short-tempered kid who still has plenty to learn, setting the tone for similarly heartrending turns by young Joslin and Pendergast."

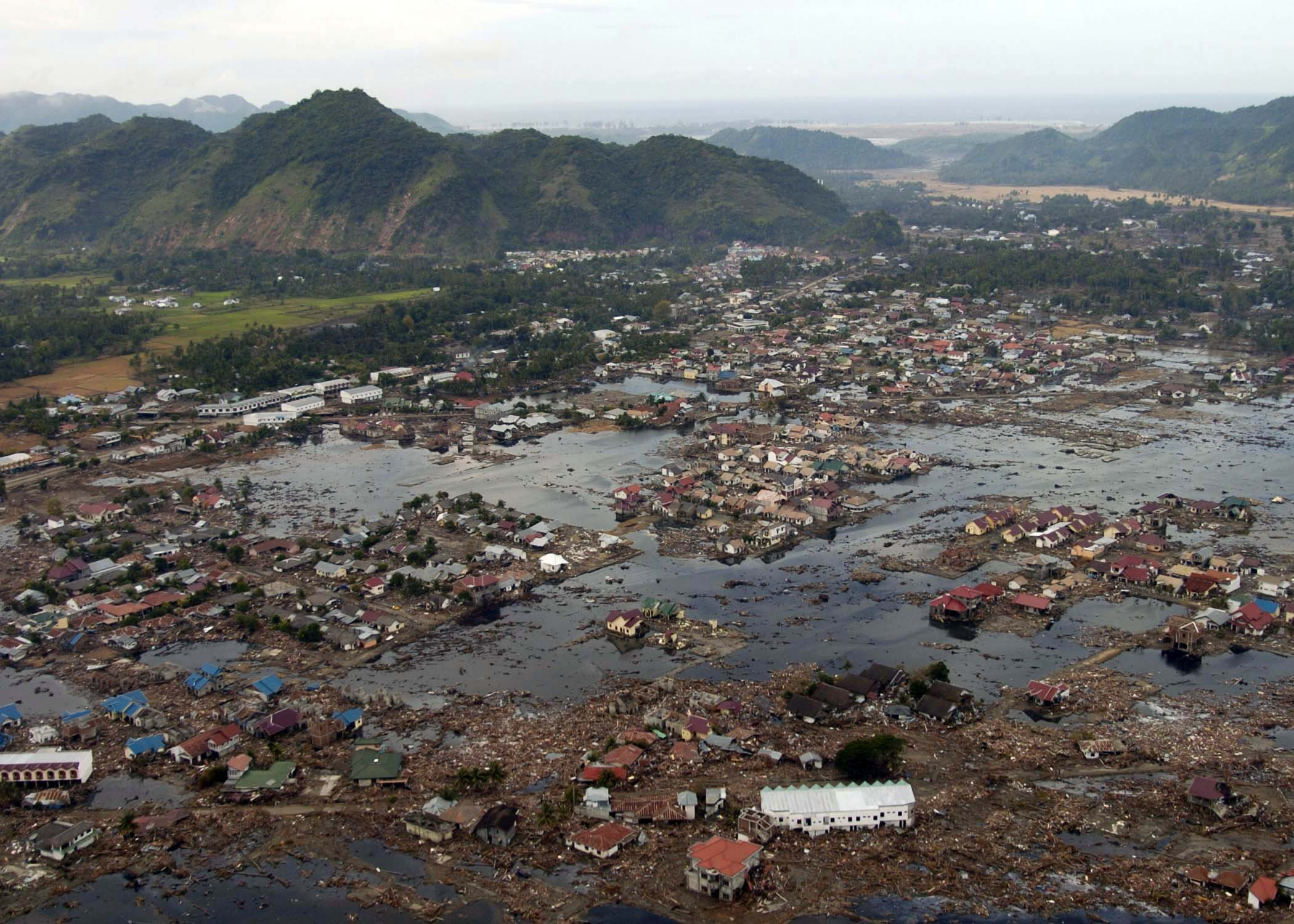
A village near the coast of Sumatra lying in ruins, seven days after the tsunami that struck South East Asia

Damon Wise of The Guardian gave the film four stars out of five. He also praised the performances, stating that "as Maria, Watts is both brave and vulnerable, and her scenes with the young Lucas (the excellent Tom Holland) are among the film's best, with adult and child now unexpected equals, the mother humbled, the son rising to the challenge. McGregor, meanwhile, gives one of his best performances as the sad and desperate Henry, trying to play the hero, the provider, while knowing his cause is almost certainly lost." About the film, he added: "Part of the appeal of this affecting and powerful drama is that it puts the viewer right in the moment at every stage, using authentic locations and tsunami survivors to hammer home the reality of this tragedy."

Eric Kohn of IndieWire gave the film a "B−" grade and stated that the film "suffers from the greater problem of emphasising a feel-good plot within the context of mass destruction."

According to The New York Times reviewer A. O. Scott, the narrowly defined cinematic framing of the disaster through European and not Thai lenses represents "a troubling complacency and a lack of compassion in The Impossible", a movie which he found to be "less an examination of mass destruction than the tale of a spoiled holiday."

Carlos Boyero of El País dismissed The Impossible as an uneven film, pointing out that the best and the worst coexist in it.

Desirée de Fez of Fotogramas rated the film 4 out of 5 star, singling out the overwhelming realism of the start as the best thing about it.

=== Victim response ===
Simon Jenkins, a British survivor from Portsmouth, wrote to The Guardian in response to critics who opined that the film was "overdramatic" and "whitewashed", stating that it was "beautifully accurate". He said, "I've never been the sort of person to revisit and analyse events of the past, but some of these articles frustrated me. Had this film been purely about the tale of a western middle class family's 'ruined' holiday then I would have agreed. For me, it was the exact opposite. Rather than concentrating on the 'privileged white visitors', the film portrayed the profound sense of community and unity that I experienced in Thailand, with this family at the centre of it. Both for my (then) 16-year-old self and the Belón family, it was the Thai people who waded through the settled water after the first wave had struck to help individuals and families… The Thai people had just lost everything – homes, businesses, families – yet their instinct was to help the tourists."

== See also ==
- List of Spanish films of 2012
- Survival film – about the film genre, with a list of related films
