= Sergio G. Sánchez =

Spanish film director

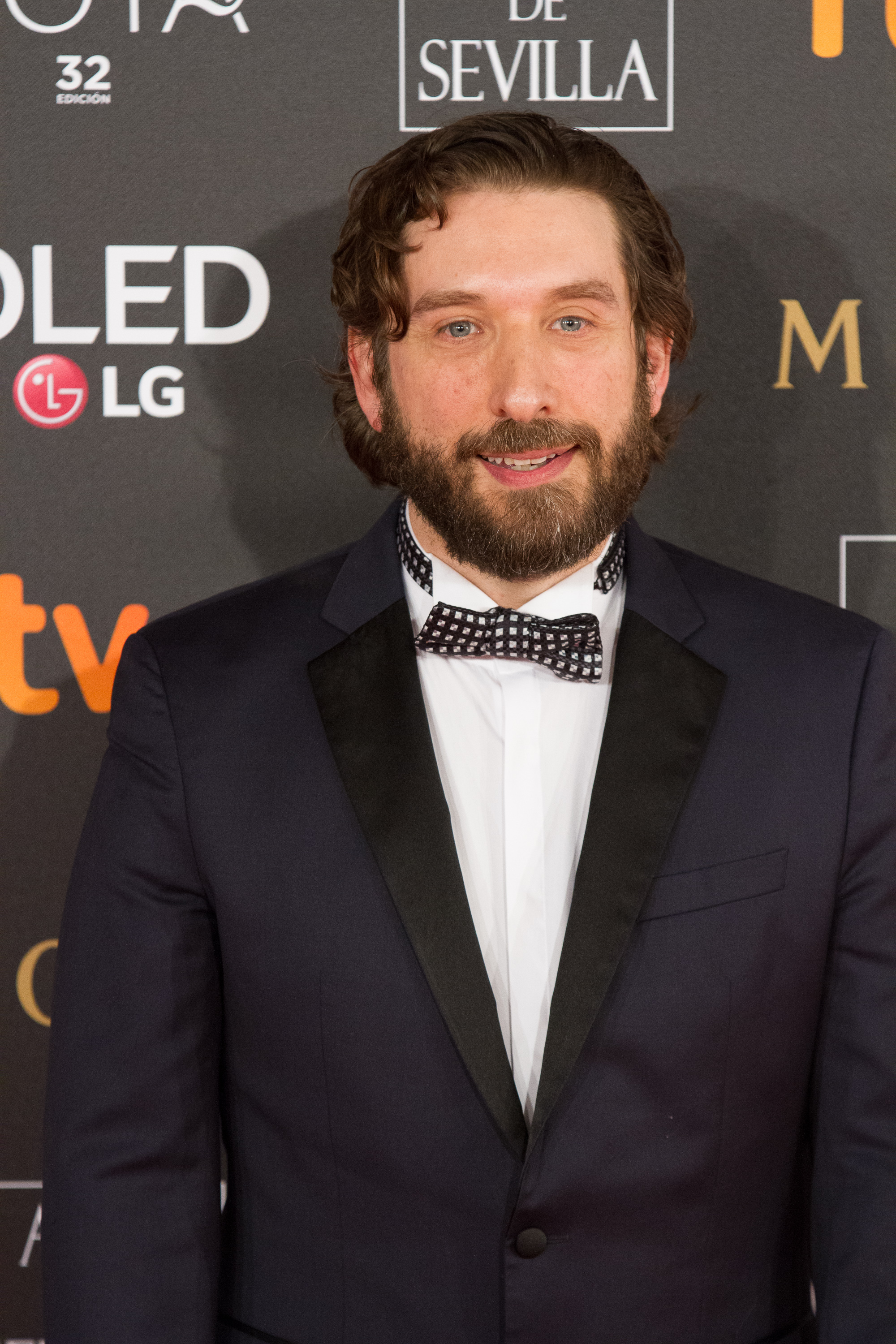
- Sánchez at the 32nd Goya Awards in 2018
- Born: Sergio Gutiérrez Sánchez; 1973 (age 52–53); Oviedo, Spain
- Occupations: Film director, screenwriter
- Years active: 2000–present

Sergio Gutiérrez Sánchez (born 1973) is a Spanish film director and screenwriter. Sánchez has written and directed his own screenplays for short films such as Temporada baja (2003) and 7337 (2000).

Born in Oviedo, Sánchez's first film script was for The Orphanage in 1996. Sánchez originally wanted to direct the script but he was repeatedly turned down by various Spanish production companies. While Sánchez was working on the short film 7337, he met with director Juan Antonio Bayona and offered him the script to direct. The Orphanage was a large hit and Sánchez was nominated for Best Screenplay at the 2008 Goya Awards in Spain.

In May 2009, Variety reported that Sánchez would re-team up with The Orphanage director Juan Antonio Bayona, on a production by Madrid-based Apaches Entertainment, Telecinco Cinema, and Spongeman, Bayona's own Barcelona-based label. Sánchez completed a first-draft screenplay in late April. The film, called The Impossible, was filmed in 2010.

== Selected filmography ==
| Year | Title | Director | Writer |
|---|---|---|---|
| 2007 | The Orphanage | No | Yes |
| 2012 | The End | No | Yes |
| 2012 | The Impossible | No | Yes |
| 2015 | Palm Trees in the Snow | No | Yes |
| 2017 | Marrowbone | Yes | Yes |
| 2022 | The Girl in the Mirror (TV series) | Yes | Yes |
