= Aida Folch =

Spanish actress

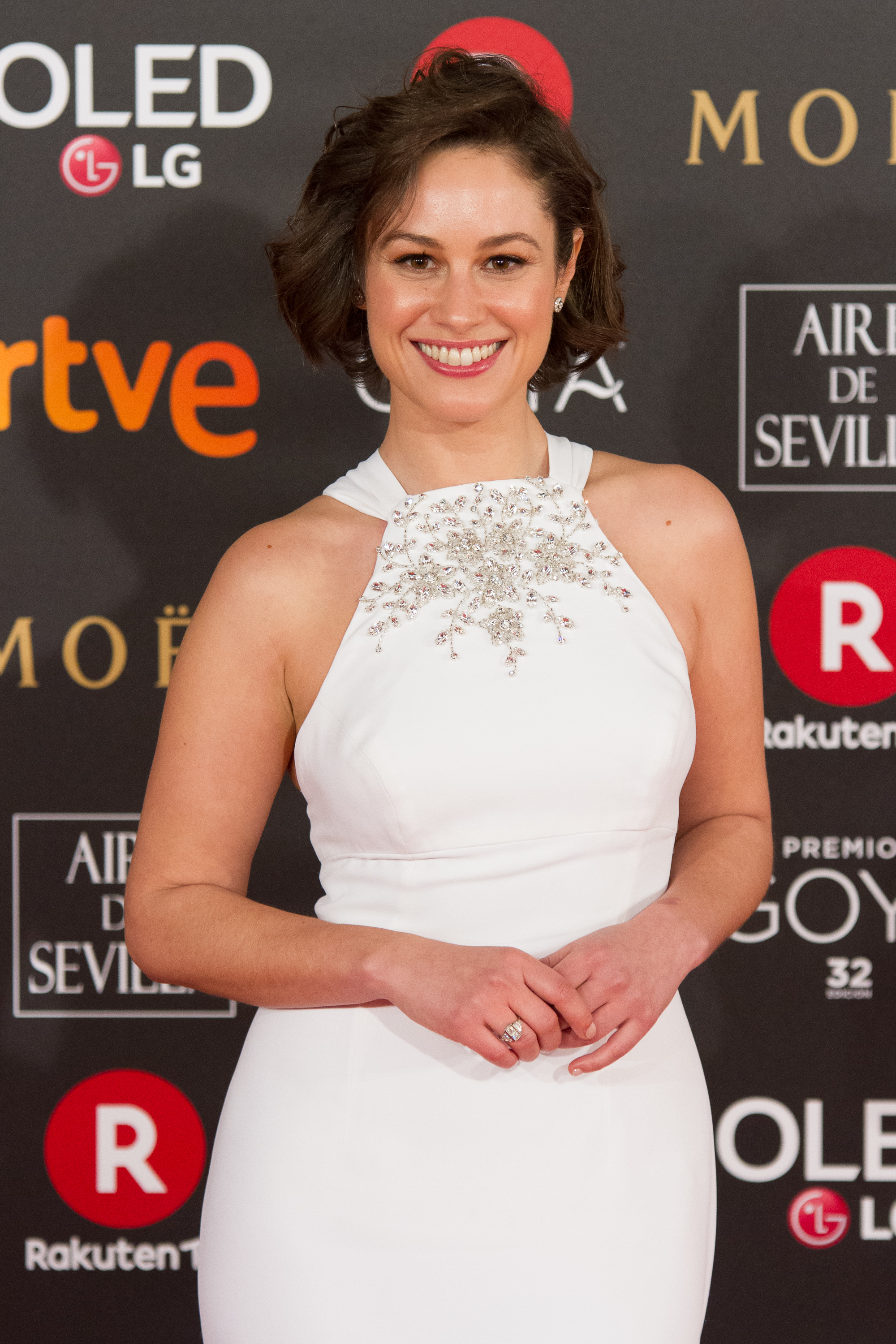
- Aida Folch, Premios Goya 2018
- Born: Aida Benítez Folch; 24 November 1986 (age 39); Reus, Catalonia, Spain
- Occupation: Actress
- Years active: 2002-present

Aida Benítez Folch (born 24 November 1986) is a Spanish actress.

== Biography ==
Aida Benítez Folch was born in Reus on 24 November 1986. After passing a two-month casting call with more than 3,000 girls throughout Spain, Folch made her film debut in Fernando Trueba's The Shanghai Spell (2002). By 2017, she had appeared in more than twenty films.

== Selected filmography ==
=== Film ===
Year	Title	Role	Notes	Ref.
2002	El embrujo de Shanghai (The Shanghai Spell)	Susana		
2002	Los lunes al sol (Mondays in the Sun)	Nata		
2004	La mirada violeta (The Violet Look)	Sofía		
2005	Fin de curso (School's Out)	Marta		
2006	Salvador (Puig Antich) (Salvador)	Marian		
2006	Celia's Lives (Las vidas de Celia)	Ángela		
2008	25 kilates (25 Carat)	Kay		
2010	Henri 4	Henriette		
2011	Mi universo en minúsculas (My Universe in Lower Case)	Aina		
2012	The Artist and the Model (L'artiste et son modèle)	Mercè		
2013	El amor no es lo que era (Love Is Not What It Used to Be)	Lucía		
2014	Fuego	Alba		
2015	Incidencias (Stranded)	Laura		
2017	La reina de España (The Queen of Spain)			
2024	Haunted Heart	Alex		

=== Television ===
Film
Year	Title	Role	Notes	Ref.
2008	Cuéntame cómo pasó (Remember When)	Francoise		
2016	Sé quién eres (I Know Who You Are)	Eva		
2019	Los nuestros 2	Montse		
2023	Amar es para siempre	Victoria Quevedo	Introduced in season 12	
