= 72nd CEC Awards =

Spanish film awards

- Date: 30 January 2017
- Site: Cine Palafox, Madrid, Spain
- Hosted by: Brays Efe; Daniel Pérez Prada
- Organized by: Círculo de Escritores Cinematográficos

Highlights
- Most awards: The Fury of a Patient Man (5)
- Most nominations: The Fury of a Patient Man (11)

The 72nd CEC Medals ceremony, presented by the Círculo de Escritores Cinematográficos, took place on 30 January 2017 at the Cine Palafox in Madrid. The gala was hosted by Brays Efe and Daniel Pérez Prada.

== Winners and nominees ==
The winners and nominees are listed as follows:

Best Film: The Fury of a Patient Man; Smoke & Mirrors; Julieta; The Olive Tree	Best Animation Film: Ozzy; Birdboy: The Forgotten Children; Elf on the Run; Pixi Post eta opari-emaileak
Best Director: Alberto Rodríguez – Smoke & Mirrors; Pedro Almodóvar – Julieta; Rodrigo Sorogoyen – May God Save Us; Icíar Bollaín – The Olive Tree	Best New Director: Raúl Arévalo – The Fury of a Patient Man; Nely Reguera – María (and Everybody Else); Salvador Calvo – 1898, Our Last Men in the Philippines; Marina Seresesky – The Open Door
Best Original Screenplay: Raúl Arévalo, David Pulido – The Fury of a Patient Man; Paul Laverty – The Olive Tree; Rodrigo Sorogoyen, Isabel Peña – May God Save Us; Andrés Duprat – The Distinguished Citizen	Best Adapted Screenplay: Alberto Rodríguez, Rafael Cobos – Smoke & Mirrors; Patrick Ness – A Monster Calls; Pedro Almodóvar – Julieta; Gerardo Olivares, Lucía Puenzo, Sallua Sehk – The Lighthouse of the Orcas
Best Actor: Eduard Fernández – Smoke & Mirrors; Antonio de la Torre – The Fury of a Patient Man; Roberto Álamo – May God Save Us; Luis Callejo – The Fury of a Patient Man; José Luis Gómez – La isla del viento	Best Actress: Emma Suárez – Julieta; Bárbara Lennie – María (and Everybody Else); Carmen Machi – The Open Door; Adriana Ugarte – Julieta; Maribel Verdú – The Lighthouse of the Orcas
Best Supporting Actor: Manolo Solo – The Fury of a Patient Man; Javier Gutiérrez – The Olive Tree; José Coronado – Smoke & Mirrors; Javier Pereira – May God Save Us	Best Supporting Actress: Ruth Díaz – The Fury of a Patient Man; Emma Suárez – The Next Skin; Terele Pávez – The Open Door; Rossy de Palma – Julieta
Best New Actor: Carlos Santos – Smoke & Mirrors; Ricardo Gómez – 1898, Our Last Men in the Philippines; Raúl Jiménez – The Fury of a Patient Man; Miki Esparbé – The One-Eyed King	Best New Actress: Anna Castillo – The Olive Tree; Ruth Díaz – The Fury of a Patient Man; Macarena Sanz – The Furies; Sílvia Pérez Cruz – At Your Doorstep
Best Cinematography: Óscar Faura – A Monster Calls; Arnau Valls Colomer – The Fury of a Patient Man; Álex Catalán – 1898, Our Last Men in the Philippines; Jean-Claude Larrieu – Julieta	Best Editing: Jaume Martí, Bernat Vilaplana – A Monster Calls; Ángel Hernández Zoido – The Fury of a Patient Man; José M. G. Moyano – Smoke & Mirrors; Alberto del Campo, Fernando Franco – May God Save Us
Best Music: Fernando Velázquez – A Monster Calls; Julio de la Rosa – Smoke & Mirrors; Alberto Iglesias – Julieta; Roque Baños – 1898, Our Last Men in the Philippines	Best Documentary Film: El Bosco. El jardín de los sueños; Nacido en Siria; J: Beyond Flamenco; La historia de Jan
Best Foreign Film: Hacksaw Ridge; Son of Saul; I, Daniel Blake; Elle; Paterson

== Special awards ==
- Honorary Medal: Emilio Gutiérrez Caba
- Medal for the Literary Merit: Diábolo Ediciones
- Medal for the Promotion of Cinema: Cine Palafox
- Medal for the Journalistic Merit: Miguel Juan Payán
