= List of Spanish films of 2016 =

A list of Spanish-produced and co-produced feature films released in Spain in 2016. When applicable, the domestic theatrical release date is favoured.

== Films ==
Release		Title (Domestic title)	Cast & Crew	Distribution label	Ref.
J A N U A R Y	1	The Academy of Muses (La academia de las musas)	Director: José Luis Guerín Cast: Raffaele Pinto, Emanuela Forgetta, Rosa Delor Muns, Mireia Iniesta, Patricia Gil, Carolina Llacher	—N/a	
J A N U A R Y	29	We Are Pregnant (Embarazados)	Director: Juana Macías Cast: Paco León, Alexandra Jiménez, Karra Elejalde	Buena Vista International	
F E B R U A R Y	19	The Broken Crown (La corona partida)	Director: Jordi Frades Cast: Rodolfo Sancho, Irene Escolar, Raúl Mérida, Eusebio Poncela, Fernando Guillén Cuervo, José Coronado	A Contracorriente Films	
F E B R U A R Y	26	We Need to Talk (Tenemos que hablar)	Director: David Serrano Cast: Hugo Silva, Michelle Jenner, Verónica Forqué, Óscar Ladoire, Ernesto Sevilla, Belén Cuesta	Warner Bros. Pictures	
M A R C H	4	To Steal from a Thief (Cien años de perdón)	Director: Daniel Calparsoro Cast: Luis Tosar, Rodrigo de la Serna, Raúl Arévalo, José Coronado	Hispano Foxfilm	(Note: Co-production Spain—France—Argentina (70%–10%–20%).)
M A R C H	4	Vulcania	Director: José Skaf Cast: Miquel Fernández, Aura Garrido, Ginés García Millán, José Sacristán, Ana Wagener, Silvia Abril, Jaime Olías, Rubén Ochandiano	Alfa Pictures	(Note: Co-production Spain—France—Sweden (70%–10%–20%).)
M A R C H	18	El pregón	Director: Dani de la Orden Cast: Andreu Buenafuente, Berto Romero, Belén Cuesta, Jorge Sanz, Goyo Jiménez	DeAPlaneta	
A P R I L	1	Kiki, Love to Love (Kiki, el amor se hace)	Director: Paco León Cast: Álex García, Natalia de Molina, Ana Katz, Belén Cuesta, Candela Peña, Luis Callejo, Luis Bermejo, Mari Paz Sayago, Alexandra Jiménez, David Mora	Vértigo Films	
A P R I L	1	Finding Altamira (Altamira)	Director: Hugh Hudson Cast: Antonio Banderas, Rupert Everett, Golshifteh Farahani, Allegra Allen, Pierre Niney, Clément Sibony, Nicholas Farrell, Henry Goodman	Hispano Foxfilm	
A P R I L	8	Julieta (Julieta)	Director: Pedro Almodóvar Cast: Adriana Ugarte, Emma Suárez, Rossy de Palma, Inma Cuesta, Michelle Jenner	Warner Bros. Pictures	
A P R I L	22	Toro	Director: Kike Maíllo Cast: Mario Casas, Luis Tosar, José Sacristán	Universal Pictures	
A P R I L	29	The Tip of the Iceberg (La punta del iceberg)	Director: David Cánovas Cast: Maribel Verdú, Carmelo Gómez, Bárbara Goenaga, Fernando Cayo, Álex García, Ginés García Millán	Syldavia Cinema	
A P R I L	29	The Night My Mother Killed My Father (La noche que mi madre mató a mi padre)	Director: Inés París Cast: Belén Rueda, Diego Peretti, María Pujalte, Fele Martínez, Patricia Montero, Eduard Fernández	Festival Films	
M A Y	6	The Olive Tree (El olivo)	Director: Icíar Bollaín Cast: Anna Castillo, Javier Gutiérrez, Pep Ambròs	eOne Films	
M A Y	6	Nacida para ganar	Director: Vicente Villanueva Cast: Alexandra Jiménez, Victoria Abril, Cristina Castaño	Sony Pictures	
M A Y	6	Tini: The Movie (Tini: El gran cambio de Violetta)	Director: Juan Pablo Buscarini Cast: Martina Stoessel, Jorge Blanco, Adrián Salzedo	Buena Vista International	
M A Y	20	The One-Eyed King (El rei borni)	Director: Marc Crehuet Cast: Alain Hernández, Miki Esparbé, Betsy Túrnez, Ruth Llopis	—N/a	
J U N E	3	Our Lovers (Nuestros amantes)	Director: Miguel Ángel Lamata Cast: Eduardo Noriega, Michelle Jenner, Fele Martínez, Amaia Salamanca, Gabino Diego	Filmax	
J U N E	3	Politics, an Instruction Manual (Política, manual de instrucciones)	Director: Fernando León de Aranoa	Betta Pictures	
J U N E	3	The Cliff (Acantilado)	Director: Helena Taberna Cast: Goya Toledo, Daniel Grao, Juana Acosta, Ingrid García-Jonsson	Alfa Pictures	
J U N E	10	Night Tales (Rumbos)	Director: Manuela Burló Moreno Cast: Pilar López de Ayala, Carmen Machi, Ernesto Alterio, Karra Elejalde, Miki Esparbé, Nora Navas, Fernando Albizu	Sony Pictures	
J U N E	17	Koblic (Capitán Kóblic)	Director: Sebastián Borensztein Cast: Ricardo Darín, Inma Cuesta, Oscar Martinez	DeAPlaneta	
J U N E	24	Pozoamargo	Director: Enrique Rivero Cast: Natalia de Molina, Jesús Gallego, Sophie Gómez	Márgenes	
J U L Y	29	Zip & Zap and the Captain's Island (Zipi y Zape y la isla del Capitán)	Director: Oskar Santos Cast: Elena Anaya, Teo Planell, Toni Gómez, Fermí Reixach, Jorge Bosch, Carolina Lapausa, Máximo Pastor, Iria Castellano	Buena Vista International	
A U G U S T	12	At the End of the Tunnel (Al final del túnel)	Director: Rodrigo Grande Cast: Leonardo Sbaraglia, Pablo Echarri, Clara Lago, Federico Luppi, Javier Godino	Warner Bros. Pictures	(Note: Co-production Spain—Argentina (60%–40%).)
A U G U S T	19	Boy Missing (Secuestro)	Director: Mar Targarona Cast: Blanca Portillo, Antonio Dechent, Vicente Romero, Josep Maria Pou, Macarena Gómez, José Coronado, Nausicaa Bonnín	Sony Pictures	
A U G U S T	26	Heroes Wanted (Cuerpo de élite)	Director: Joaquín Mazón Cast: María León, Andoni Agirregomezkorta, Miki Esparbé, Sílvia Abril	Hispano Foxfilm	
S E P T E M B E R	2	The Open Door (La puerta abierta)	Director: Marina Seresesky Cast: Carmen Machi, Terele Pávez, Asier Etxeandía, Lucía Balas, Elvira Mínguez, Paco Tous	Pirámide Films	
S E P T E M B E R	2	At Your Doorstep (Cerca de tu casa)	Director: Eduard Cortés Cast: Sílvia Pérez Cruz, Adriana Ozores, Lluís Homar, Iván Massagué	A Contracorriente Films	
S E P T E M B E R	2	Far from the Sea (Lejos del mar)	Director: Imanol Uribe Cast: Eduard Fernández, Elena Anaya	Vértice 360	
S E P T E M B E R	2	The Chosen (El elegido)	Director: Antonio Chavarrías Cast: Hannah Murray, Alfonso Herrera, Henry Goodman	Filmax	
S E P T E M B E R	9	The Fury of a Patient Man (Tarde para la ira)	Director: Raúl Arévalo Cast: Antonio de la Torre, Ruth Díaz, Luis Callejo, Manolo Solo, Alicia Rubio, Raúl Jiménez, Font García	eOne Films	
S E P T E M B E R	9	Guernica (Gernika)	Director: Koldo Serra Cast: María Valverde, James D'Arcy, Jack Davenport	Betta Pictures	
S E P T E M B E R	23	Smoke & Mirrors (El hombre de las mil caras)	Director: Alberto Rodríguez Cast: Eduard Fernández, José Coronado, Marta Etura, Carlos Santos	Warner Bros. Pictures	
S E P T E M B E R	23	Neruda	Director: Pablo Larraín Cast: Mercedes Morán, Gael García Bernal, Luis Gnecco	Wanda Visión	
S E P T E M B E R	30	The Reconquest (La reconquista)	Director: Jonás Trueba Cast: Francesco Carril, Itsaso Arana, Pablo Hoyos, Candela Recio, Aura Garrido	Cine Binario	
S E P T E M B E R	30	El tiempo de los monstruos	Director: Félix Sabroso Cast: Javier Cámara, Candela Peña, Carmen Machi, Julián López, Pilar Castro	Splendor Films	
O C T O B E R	7	A Monster Calls (Un monstruo viene a verme)	Director: J.A. Bayona Cast: Felicity Jones, Lewis MacDougall, Sigourney Weaver, Liam Neeson, Toby Kebbell, Geraldine Chaplin	Universal Pictures	
O C T O B E R	7	J: Beyond Flamenco (Jota de Saura)	Director: Carlos Saura	Sherlock Films	
O C T O B E R	16	Ozzy	Director: Alberto Rodríguez, Nacho La Casa	Buena Vista International	(Note: Co-production Spain–Canada (80%–20%).)
O C T O B E R	21	The Next Skin (La próxima piel)	Director: Isaki Lacuesta, Isa Campo Cast: Àlex Monner, Emma Suárez, Sergi López, Bruno Todeschini	Betta Pictures	
O C T O B E R	28	May God Save Us (Que Dios nos perdone)	Director: Rodrigo Sorogoyen Cast: Antonio de la Torre, Roberto Álamo, Andrés Gertrúdix	Warner Bros. Pictures	
O C T O B E R	28	7 años	Director: Roger Gual Cast: Paco León, Àlex Brendemühl, Juan Pablo Raba, Juana Acosta, Manuel Morón	Netflix	(Note: Co-production Spain—Colombia (80%–20%).)
O C T O B E R	28	The Mother (La madre)	Director: Alberto Morais Cast: Laia Marull, Nieve de Medina, Sergio Caballero	Syldavia Cinema	
N O V E M B E R	4	100 Meters (100 metros)	Director: Marcel Barrena Cast: Dani Rovira, Karra Elejalde, Alexandra Jiménez	Filmax	
N O V E M B E R	11	The Distinguished Citizen (El ciudadano ilustre)	Director: Gastón Duprat, Mariano Cohn Cast: Oscar Martínez, Dady Brieva, Andrea Frigerio	A Contracorriente Films	
N O V E M B E R	11	The Furies (Las furias)	Director: Miguel del Arco Cast: Pere Arquillué, Gonzalo de Castro, Elisabet Gelabert, Bárbara Lennie, Carmen Machi, José Sacristán, Mercedes Sampietro, Alberto San Juan, Macarena Sanz, Emma Suárez	Wanda Visión	
N O V E M B E R	11	Don't Blame the Karma for Being an Idiot (No culpes al karma de lo que te pasa por gilipollas)	Director: Maria Ripoll Cast: Verónica Echegui, Álex García, David Verdaguer, Alba Galocha	Sony Pictures	
N O V E M B E R	25	The Queen of Spain (La reina de España)	Director: Fernando Trueba Cast: Penélope Cruz, Antonio Resines, Neus Asensi, Ana Belén, Javier Cámara, Chino Darín, Loles León, Arturo Ripstein, Jorge Sanz, Rosa María Sardá, Santiago Segura, Cary Elwes, Clive Revill, Mandy Patinkin	Universal Pictures	
N O V E M B E R	25	The Death of Louis XIV (La muerte de Luis XIV)	Director: Albert Serra Cast: Jean-Pierre Léaud, Patrick d'Assumçao, Marc Susini, Irène Silvagni, Bernard Belin, Jacques Henric, Vincenç Altaió	Capricci Cine	(Note: Co-production Spain–France–Portugal (20%–58%–22%))
D E C E M B E R	2	1898, Our Last Men in the Philippines (1898: Los últimos de Filipinas)	Director: Salvador Calvo Cast: Luis Tosar, Javier Gutiérrez, Álvaro Cervantes, Karra Elejalde, Carlos Hipólito, Ricardo Gómez, Eduard Fernández	Sony Pictures	
D E C E M B E R	2	A Stroke of Luck (Villaviciosa de al lado)	Director: Nacho García Velilla Cast: Carmen Machi, Leo Harlem, Carlos Santos, Boré Buika, Arturo Valls, Antonio Pagudo, Jorge Asín, Macarena García, Corina Randazzo	Warner Bros. Pictures	
D E C E M B E R	7	María (and Everybody Else) (María (y los demás))	Director: Nely Reguera Cast: Bárbara Lennie, Julián Villagrán, Pablo Derqui	Avalon	
D E C E M B E R	16	The Lighthouse of the Orcas (El faro de las orcas)	Director: Gerardo Olivares Cast: Maribel Verdú, Joaquín Furriel	Wanda Visión	(Note: Co-production Spain—Argentina (80%–20%).)

== Box office ==
The five highest-grossing Spanish feature films in 2016, by domestic box office gross revenue, are as follows:

Highest-grossing films of 2016
Rank	Title	Distributor	Viewers	Domestic gross (€)
1	A Monster Calls (Un monstruo viene a verme)	Universal Pictures	4,584,941	26,030,151.93
2	Palm Trees in the Snow (Palmeras en la nieve) ‡	Warner Bros. Pictures	1,973,340	12,471,763.65
3	A Stroke of Luck (Villaviciosa de al Lado)	Warner Bros. Pictures	1,269,909	8,188,142.32
4	To Steal from a Thief (Cien años de perdón)	Hispano Foxfilm	1,078,360	6,634,694.12
5	Heroes Wanted (Cuerpo de élite)	Hispano Foxfilm	1,074,455	6,305,470.70
6	Kiki, Love to Love (Kiki, el amor se hace)	Vértigo Films	1,089,475	6,277,684.58
7	Spanish Affair 2 (Ocho apellidos catalanes) ‡	Universal Pictures	608,797	3,924,365.31
8	Smoke & Mirrors (El hombre de las mil caras)	Warner Bros. Pictures	417,001	2,601,906.99
9	Zip & Zap and the Captain's Island (Zipi y Zape y la isla del capitán)	Buena Vista International	472,726	2,510,130.34
10	Julieta	Warner Bros. Pictures	352,549	2,193,545.30
‡: 2015 theatrical opening

== See also ==
- 31st Goya Awards
