= 9th Gaudí Awards =

- Date: 29 January 2017
- Site: CCIB, Barcelona, Catalonia, Spain
- Hosted by: Bruno Oro
- Organized by: Catalan Film Academy

Highlights
- Best Picture: The Next Skin

The 9th Gaudí Awards ceremony, presented by the Catalan Film Academy, was held at the CCIB complex in Barcelona on 29 January 2017. The gala was hosted by Bruno Oro.

== Background ==
The nominations were read by Miranda Gas and Francesc Orella from La Pedrera on 29 December 2016. The awards ceremony took place on 29 January 2017 and it was hosted by Bruno Oro. It featured musical performances by Els Amics de les Arts, Sopa de Cabra, and Marina Rossell.

== Winners and nominees ==
The winners and nominees are listed as follows:

Best Film: The Next Skin; The One-Eyed King; Les amigues de l'Àgata; Tots els camins de Déu	Bet Non-Catalan Language Film: A Monster Calls; 100 Meters; Callback; The Death of Louis XIV
Best Director: J.A. Bayona — A Monster Calls; Albert Serra — The Death of Louis XIV; Isaki Lacuesta, Isa Campo — The Next Skin; Marc Crehuet — The One-Eyed King	Best Screenplay: Isaki Lacuesta, Isa Campo, Fran Araújo — The Next Skin; Carles Torras, Martín Bacigalupo — Callback; Marc Crehuet — The One-Eyed King; Marcel Barrena — 100 Meters
Best Actress: Emma Suárez — The Next Skin; Betsy Túrnez — The One-Eyed King; Ruth Llopis — The One-Eyed King; Sílvia Pérez Cruz — At Your Doorstep	Best Actor: Eduard Fernández — Smoke & Mirrors; Alain Hernández — The One-Eyed King; Àlex Monner — The Next Skin; Miki Esparbé — The One-Eyed King
Best Supporting Actress: Alexandra Jiménez — 100 Meters; Adriana Ozores — At Your Doorstep; Clara Segura — 100 Meters; Greta Fernández — The Next Skin	Best Supporting Actor: Karra Elejalde — 100 Meters; Bruno Bergonzini — 100 Meters; David Verdaguer — 100 Meters; Sergi López — The Next Skin
Best Production Supervision: Sandra Hermida — A Monster Calls; Toni Carrizosa — Toro; Teresa Gefaell, Alberto Álvarez — 100 Meters; Xavi Resina — The Next Skin	Best Documentary Film: Alcaldessa; Bigas x Bigas; Priorat; Sexe, maraques i chihuahues
Best European Film: Elle; Mustang; Son of Saul; The Lobster	Best Short Film: Timecode; En la azotea; Graffiti; Tiger
Best Television Film: Ebre, del bressol a la batalla; Fassman: l'increïble home radar; La Xirgu; Laia	Best Art Direction: Eugenio Caballero — A Monster Calls; Roger Bellés — The Next Skin; Sebastian Vogler — The Death of Louis XIV; Sylvia Steinbrecht — The One-Eyed King
Best Editing: Jaume Martí, Bernat Vilaplana — A Monster Calls; Albert Serra, Artur Tort, Ariadna Ribas — The Death of Louis XIV; Domi Parra — The Next Skin; Jaume Martí — Contratiempo	Best Cinematography: Óscar Faura — A Monster Calls; Arnau Valls Colomer — The Fury of a Patient Man; Diego Dussuel — The Next Skin; Jonathan Ricquebourg — The Death of Louis XIV
Best Original Music: Sílvia Pérez Cruz — At Your Doorstep; Arnau Bataller — The Chosen; Fernando Velázquez — A Monster Calls; Gerard Gil — The Next Skin	Best Costume Design: Nina Avramovic — The Death of Louis XIV; Ariadna Papió — Guernica; Mercè Paloma — The Chosen; Steven Noble — A Monster Calls
Best Sound: Oriol Tarragó, Peter Glossop, Marc Orts — A Monster Calls; Albert Manera, Xavier Mas — At Your Doorstep; Alejandro Castillo, Amanda Villavieja, Denis Séchaud — The Next Skin; Marc Orts, Carlos Alberto Lopes, Branko Neskov — 100 Meters	Best Makeup and Hairstyles: Marion Vissac, Antoine Mancini — The Death of Louis XIV; Marese Langan — A Monster Calls; Miriam Blank, Laura Pellicciotta — The Next Skin; Patricia Reyes, Alba Guillén — 100 Meters
Best Visual Effects: Félix Bergés, Pau Costa, David Martí, Montse Ribé — A Monster Calls; Alex Villagrasa — 100 Meters; Lluís Castells — The Chosen; Rafa Galdó — Toro	Best Animated Film: Ozzy

=== Honorary Award ===
Actor Josep Maria Pou was the recipient of the Gaudí honorary award.
