= 4th Feroz Awards =

2017 Spanish film and television awards

- Date: January 23, 2017
- Site: Palacete de los Duques de Pastrana, Madrid
- Hosted by: Antonio de la Torre
- Organized by: Asociación de Informadores Cinematográficos de España

Highlights
- Best Picture: The Fury of a Patient Man (Drama); Kiki, Love to Love (Comedy)
- Best Direction: Raúl Arévalo; The Fury of a Patient Man
- Best Actor: Roberto Álamo; May God Save Us
- Best Actress: Bárbara Lennie; María (and Everybody Else)
- Most awards: The Fury of a Patient Man (5)
- Most nominations: Smoke & Mirrors (10)

Television coverage
- Network: #0

The 4th award ceremony of Feroz Awards was held at the Palacete de los Duques de Pastrana in Madrid, on January 23, 2017. It was hosted by actor Antonio de la Torre and aired on #0. Awards recognizing television productions and documentary films were handed for the first time.

== Winners and nominees ==
The nominees were announced on December 1, 2016.

=== Film ===
Best Drama Film: The Fury of a Patient Man; Smoke & Mirrors; Julieta; A Monster Calls; May God Save Us	Best Comedy Film: Kiki, Love to Love; María (and Everybody Else); The Night My Mother Killed My Father; The Open Door; The One-Eyed King
Best Director: Raúl Arévalo — The Fury of a Patient Man; Pedro Almodóvar — Julieta; Juan Antonio Bayona — A Monster Calls; Alberto Rodríguez — Smoke & Mirrors; Rodrigo Sorogoyen — May God Save Us	Best Screenplay: David Pulido, Raúl Arévalo — The Fury of a Patient Man; Alberto Rodríguez, Rafael Cobos — Smoke & Mirrors; Pedro Almodóvar — Julieta; Patrick Ness — A Monster Calls; Isabel Peña & Rodrigo Sorogoyen — May God Save Us
Best Main Actor in a Film: Roberto Álamo — May God Save Us; Eduard Fernández — Smoke & Mirrors; Lewis MacDougall — A Monster Calls; Alain Hernández — The One-Eyed King; Àlex Monner — The Next Skin; Antonio de la Torre — The Fury of a Patient Man	Best Main Actress in a Film: Bárbara Lennie — María (and Everybody Else); Anna Castillo — The Olive Tree; Carmen Machi — The Open Door; Emma Suárez — Julieta; Adriana Ugarte — Julieta
Best Supporting Actor in a Film: Manolo Solo — The Fury of a Patient Man; Carlos Santos — Smoke & Mirrors; Luis Callejo — The Fury of a Patient Man; José Coronado — Smoke & Mirrors; Javier Pereira — May God Save Us	Best Supporting Actress in a Film: Ruth Díaz — The Fury of a Patient Man; Marta Etura — Smoke & Mirrors; Rossy de Palma — Julieta; Terele Pávez — The Open Door; Candela Peña — Kiki, Love to Love
Best Original Soundtrack: Fernando Velázquez — A Monster Calls; Sílvia Pérez Cruz — At Your Doorstep; Julio de la Rosa — Smoke & Mirrors; Alberto Iglesias — Julieta; Olivier Arson — May God Save Us	Best Trailer: Kiki, Love to Love; Smoke & Mirrors; Julieta; A Monster Calls; May God Save Us
Best Film Poster: Smoke & Mirrors; Julieta; Kiki, Love to Love; A Monster Calls; The Fury of a Patient Man

=== Television ===
Best Drama Series: El ministerio del tiempo (season 2); El Caso: Crónica de sucesos (season 1); Mar de plástico (season 2); Merlí (season 2); Locked Up (season 2)	Best Comedy Series: Paquita Salas (season 1); ¿Qué fue de Jorge Sanz? (5 años después) (special episode); Allí abajo (season 2); Cites (season 1); La que se avecina (season 9)
Best Main Actor in a Series: Brays Efe — Paquita Salas; Pedro Casablanc — Mar de plástico; Nacho Fresneda — El ministerio del tiempo; Rodolfo Sancho — El ministerio del tiempo; Fernando Guillén Cuervo — El Caso: Crónica de sucesos	Best Main Actress in a Series: Aura Garrido — El ministerio del tiempo; Maggie Civantos — Locked Up; Marta Etura — La sonata del silencio; Najwa Nimri — Locked Up; Verónica Sánchez — El Caso: Crónica de sucesos
Best Supporting Actor in a Series: Hugo Silva — El ministerio del tiempo; José Sacristán — Velvet; Patrick Criado — Mar de plástico; Jaime Blanch — El ministerio del tiempo; Julián Villagrán — El ministerio del tiempo	Best Supporting Actress in a Series: Belén Cuesta — Paquita Salas; Inma Cuevas — Locked Up; Cecilia Freire — Velvet; Cayetana Guillén Cuervo — El ministerio del tiempo; Alba Flores — Locked Up

=== Non competitive awards ===
- Feroz de Honor: Narciso Ibáñez Serrador
- Premio Especial: The Death of Louis XIV
- Best Documentary Film: Dead Slow Ahead

== See also ==
- 31st Goya Awards
