= 31st Goya Awards =

- Date: 4 February 2017
- Site: Madrid Marriott Auditorium Hotel, Madrid
- Hosted by: Dani Rovira

Highlights
- Best Film: The Fury of a Patient Man
- Best Actor: Roberto Álamo; May God Save Us
- Best Actress: Emma Suárez; Julieta
- Most awards: A Monster Calls (9)
- Most nominations: A Monster Calls (12)

Television coverage
- Network: TVE

The 31st Goya Awards were presented at the Madrid Marriott Auditorium Hotel in Madrid on 4 February 2017 to honour the best in Spanish films of 2016. Actor and comedian Dani Rovira was the master of ceremonies for the third time in a row.

Nominations were announced on 14 December 2016 by Javier Cámara and Natalia de Molina. A Monster Calls received the most nominations with twelve, followed by Smoke & Mirrors and The Fury of a Patient Man with eleven nominations each.

The Fury of a Patient Man won Best Film, as well as Best Supporting Actor, Best Original Screenplay and Best New Director, but A Monster Calls won the most awards, with nine awards, including Best Director. Actress Emma Suárez won two awards on the same night: Best Actress for Julieta and Best Supporting Actress for La próxima piel.

== Winners and nominees ==
| Best Film: The Fury of a Patient Man; Smoke & Mirrors; Julieta; May God Save Us; A Monster Calls | Best Director: J. A. Bayona – A Monster Calls; Pedro Almodóvar – Julieta; Alberto Rodríguez – Smoke & Mirrors; Rodrigo Sorogoyen – May God Save Us |
| Best Actor: Roberto Álamo – May God Save Us; Luis Callejo – The Fury of a Patient Man; Antonio de la Torre – The Fury of a Patient Man; Eduard Fernández – Smoke & Mirrors | Best Actress: Emma Suárez – Julieta; Penélope Cruz – The Queen of Spain; Bárbara Lennie – María (and Everybody Else); Carmen Machi – The Open Door |
| Best Supporting Actor: Manolo Solo – The Fury of a Patient Man; Karra Elejalde – 100 Meters; Javier Gutiérrez – The Olive Tree; Javier Pereira – May God Save Us | Best Supporting Actress: Emma Suárez – The Next Skin; Terele Pávez – The Open Door; Candela Peña – Kiki, Love to Love; Sigourney Weaver – A Monster Calls |
| Best New Actor: Carlos Santos – Smoke & Mirrors; Rodrigo de la Serna – To Steal from a Thief; Ricardo Gómez – 1898, Our Last Men in the Philippines; Raúl Jiménez – The Fury of a Patient Man | Best New Actress: Anna Castillo – The Olive Tree; Belén Cuesta – Kiki, Love to Love; Ruth Díaz – The Fury of a Patient Man; Sílvia Pérez Cruz – At Your Doorstep |
| Best Original Screenplay: Raúl Arévalo, David Pulido – The Fury of a Patient Man; Jorge Guerricaechevarría – To Steal from a Thief; Paul Laverty – The Olive Tree; Isabel Peña, Rodrigo Sorogoyen – May God Save Us | Best Adapted Screenplay: Alberto Rodríguez, Rafael Cobos – Smoke & Mirrors; Pedro Almodóvar – Julieta; Paco León, Fernando Pérez – Kiki, Love to Love; Patrick Ness – A Monster Calls |
| Best Spanish Language Foreign Film: The Distinguished Citizen · Argentina; Anna · Colombia; From Afar · Venezuela; The Chosen Ones · Mexico | Best European Film: Elle · France/Germany/Belgium; Genius · United Kingdom/United States; Son of Saul · Hungary; I, Daniel Blake · United Kingdom/France/Belgium |
| Best New Director: Raúl Arévalo – The Fury of a Patient Man; Salvador Calvo – 1898, Our Last Men in the Philippines; Marc Crehuet – The One-Eyed King; Nely Reguera – María (and Everybody Else) | Best Animated Film: Birdboy: The Forgotten Children; Teresa & Tim; Ozzy |
| Best Cinematography: Óscar Faura – A Monster Calls; Alex Catalán – 1898, Our Last Men in the Philippines; José Luis Alcaine – The Queen of Spain; Arnau Valls Colomer – The Fury of a Patient Man | Best Editing: Bernat Vilaplana, Jaume Martí – A Monster Calls; José M. G. Moyano – Smoke & Mirrors; Alberto del Campo, Fernando Franco – May God Save Us; Ángel Hernández Zoido – The Fury of a Patient Man |
| Best Art Direction: Eugenio Caballero – A Monster Calls; Carlos Bodelón – 1898, Our Last Men in the Philippines; Pepe Domínguez del Olmo – Smoke & Mirrors; Juan Pedro de Gaspar – The Queen of Spain | Best Production Supervision: Sandra Hermida Muñiz – A Monster Calls; Carlos Bernases – 1898, Our Last Men in the Philippines; Manuela Ocón – Smoke & Mirrors; Pilar Robla – The Queen of Spain |
| Best Sound: Peter Glossop, Oriol Tarragó, Marc Orts – A Monster Calls; Eduardo Esquide, Juan Ferro, Nicolas de Poulpiquet – 1898, Our Last Men in the Philippines; Daniel de Zayas, César Molina, José Antonio Manovel – Smoke & Mirrors; Nacho Royo-Villanova, Sergio Testón – Ozzy | Best Special Effects: Pau Costa, Félix Bergés – A Monster Calls; Pau Costa, Carlos Lozano – 1898, Our Last Men in the Philippines; Raúl Romanillos, David Heras – Guernica; Reyes Abades, Eduardo Díaz – Julieta |
| Best Costume Design: Paola Torres – 1898, Our Last Men in the Philippines; Lala Huete – The Queen of Spain; Cristina Rodríguez – Don't Blame the Karma for Being an Idiot; Alberto Valcárcel, Cristina Rodríguez – The Fury of a Patient Man | Best Makeup and Hairstyles: Marese Langan, David Martí – A Monster Calls; Milu Cabrer, Alicia López, Pedro Rodríguez "Pedrati" – 1898, Our Last Men in the Philippines; Yolanda Piña – Smoke & Mirrors; Ana López-Puigcerver, Sergio Pérez Berbel, David Martí – Julieta |
| Best Original Score: Fernando Velázquez – A Monster Calls; Julio de la Rosa – Smoke & Mirrors; Pascal Gaigne – The Olive Tree; Alberto Iglesias – Julieta | Best Original Song: "Ai, ai, ai" by Sílvia Pérez Cruz – At Your Doorstep; "Descubriendo India" by Luis Ivars – Bollywood Made in Spain; "Muerte" by Zeltia Montes – Frágil equilibrio; "Kiki" by Alejandro Acosta, Cristina Manjón, David Borràs Paronella, Marc Peña Rius and Paco León – Kiki, Love to Love |
| Best Fictional Short Film: Timecode; Bla, bla, bla; En la azotea; Graffiti; La invitación | Best Animated Short Film: Decorado; Darrel; Made in Spain; Uka |
| Best Documentary Film: Frágil equilibro; Omega; El Bosco. El jardín de los sueños; Nacido en Siria | Best Documentary Short Film: Cabezas habladoras; Esperanza; Palabras de caramelo; The Resurrection Club |

== Honorary Goya ==
- Ana Belén
