= 26th Actors and Actresses Union Awards =

2017 Spanish award ceremony

- Date: 13 March 2017
- Site: Circo Price, Madrid, Spain
- Hosted by: Cristina Medina
- Organized by: Actors and Actresses Union

Highlights
- Honorary career award: Alicia Hermida

The 26th Actors and Actresses Union Awards ceremony was held on 13 March 2017 at the Circo Price in Madrid. The gala was hosted by Cristina Medina.

In addition to the competitive awards, Jaime Lorente Acosta received the 'Mujeres en Unión' award, Alicia Hermida the 'A toda una vida' career award and Festival Internacional 16 Kilómetros La Cañada Real the Special Award. Inma Cuevas won two awards, both in television and theatre categories.

== Winners and nominees ==
The winners and nominees are listed as follows:

=== Film ===
Best Male Performance in a Leading Role: Luis Callejo – The Fury of a Patient Man; Álvaro Cervantes – 1898, Our Last Men in the Philippines; Antonio de la Torre – The Fury of a Patient Man	Best Female Performance in a Leading Role: Carmen Machi – The Open Door; Emma Suárez – Julieta; Penélope Cruz – The Queen of Spain
Best Male Performance in a Secondary Role: Carlos Santos – Smoke & Mirrors; Asier Etxeandía – The Open Door; Javier Pereira – May God Save Us	Best Female Performance in a Secondary Role: Candela Peña – Kiki, Love to Love; Adriana Ozores – At Your Doorstep; Terele Pávez – The Open Door
Best Male Performance in a Minor Role: Manolo Solo – The Fury of a Patient Man; Carlos Hipólito – 1898, Our Last Men in the Philippines; Luis Callejo – To Steal from a Thief	Best Female Performance in a Minor Role: Pilar Gómez – The Fury of a Patient Man; Emma Suárez – The Furies; Nathalie Poza – Julieta

=== Television ===
Best Male Performance in a Leading Role: Pedro Casablanc – Mar de plástico; José Sacristán – Velvet; Roberto Enríquez – Locked Up	Best Female Performance in a Leading Role: Aura Garrido – El ministerio del tiempo; Maggie Civantos – Locked Up; Najwa Nimri – Locked Up
Best Male Performance in a Secondary Role: Julián Villagrán – El ministerio del tiempo; Asier Etxeandía – Velvet; Raúl Arévalo – La embajada	Best Female Performance in a Secondary Role: Alba Flores – Locked Up; Alicia Borrachero – La embajada; María Isabel Díaz – Locked Up
Best Male Performance in a Minor Role: Adrián Lastra – Velvet; Carlos Bardem – La embajada; Carlos Hipólito – El ministerio del tiempo	Best Female Performance in a Minor Role: Inma Cuevas – Locked Up; Anna Castillo – Paquita Salas; Lisi Linder – Mar de plástico

=== Theatre ===
Best Male Performance in a Leading Role: Ángel Ruiz – Miguel de Molina, al desnudo.; Carmelo Gómez – The Mayor of Zalamea; Héctor Alterio – Le Père	Best Female Performance in a Leading Role: Consuelo Trujillo – Criatura; Aitana Sánchez-Gijón – The Rose Tattoo; Alicia Borrachero – Tierra de fuego
Best Male Performance in a Secondary Role: José Troncoso – Historias de Usera; Alberto San Juan – El rey; Víctor Clavijo – El jurado	Best Female Performance in a Secondary Role: Inma Cuevas – Historias de Usera; Ana Wagener – Hamlet; Carmen Ruiz – Bajo terapia
Best Male Performance in a Minor Role: Rubén Frías – Danzad malditos; Álex García – Incendios; Luis Rallo – Le Père	Best Female Performance in a Minor Role: Estefanía de los Santos – La distancia; Alba Enríquez – The Dog in the Manger; Zaira Montes – Le Père

=== Newcomers ===
Best New Actor: Font García – The Fury of a Patient Man; Brays Efe – Paquita Salas; Ricardo Gómez – 1898, Our Last Men in the Philippines	Best New Actress: Ruth Díaz – The Fury of a Patient Man; Anna Castillo – The Olive Tree; Camila Viyuela – La respiración
