= 100 metres (disambiguation) =

100 metres is a sprint race in track and field competitions.

100 metres may also refer to:

== Sporting events ==
- 100 metres at the Olympics
- 100 metres hurdles, track and field event
- 100 metre freestyle, swimming event
- 100 metres butterfly, swimming event
- 100 meter running deer, shooting event
- 4 × 100 metres relay, sprint relay event

== Films ==
- 100 Meters (2016 film), Spanish film
- 100 Meters (manga), Japanese manga and 2025 film
