= Flores para Antonio =

- Theatrical release poster
- Directed by: Elena Molina; Isaki Lacuesta
- Written by: Elena Molina; Isaki Lacuesta
- Produced by: Alba Flores; Ana Villa; Bruna Hernando; Sara Montoliu; Eduardo Villanueva; Clara Lago; Charli Bujosa Cortés
- Cinematography: Juana Jiménez
- Edited by: Mamen Díaz; Alicia González Sahagún
- Music by: Silvia Pérez Cruz; Alba Flores
- Production companies: Flower Power Producciones; LACOproductora; Caballo Films; Flores para Antonio la película AIE
- Distributed by: A Contracorriente Films
- Release dates: 23 September 2023 (Zinemaldia); 28 November 2025 (Spain)
- Country: Spain
- Language: Spanish

Flores para Antonio (Note: 'Flowers for Antonio' or 'Flores to Antonio'.) is a 2025 Spanish documentary film written and directed by Elena Molina and Isaki Lacuesta about the figure of musician Antonio Flores, primarily through the perspective of his daughter Alba Flores.

== Subject ==
Alba Flores explores the life of her father Antonio Flores, accompanied by Ana Villa, Lolita, and Rosario, plus the additional participation of the likes of Antonio Carmona, Ariel Rot, Joaquín Sabina, and Silvia Pérez Cruz.

== Production ==
Flores para Antonio is a Movistar Plus+ original film produced by Flower Power Producciones, LACOproductora, Caballo Films, and Flores para Antonio la película AIE. Alba Flores explained the film was "clearly made with the intention of easing the pain" about Antonio's early demise, as he was found dead in May 1995 in a cabin he built himself days after the death of his mother Lola Flores, when Alba was eight.

== Release ==
The film premiered in a non-competitive official selection slot of the 73rd San Sebastián International Film Festival on 23 September 2025. Distributed by A Contracorriente Films, it was released theatrically in Spain on 28 November 2025, followed by a streaming release on Movistar Plus+ in early 2026. It was programmed in the 'Ibero-American Documentary Feature Film' selection of the 41st Guadalajara International Film Festival.

== Reception ==
Elsa Fernández-Santos of El País assessed that the film's hallmark is Alba Flores' sincerity, "showing her pain with disarming naturalness and truth", otherwise a common trait of a family that has grown up in the public eye.

Andrea G. Bermejo of Cinemanía rated the film 4 out of 5 stars, assessing that it results into the "best posthumous tribute Antonio Flores could receive", managing to outline a "much more interesting" profile of Antonio than the one sketched by 1990s mass media.

In his 3-star rating, Manuel J. Lombardo of Diario de Sevilla deemed the film to be "a collage with a well-crafted narrative", although the reviewer declared to feel himself more interested in the parts leaning on reconstructing Antonio's career and personality than those tackling his legacy or his reflection on his daughter.

== Accolades ==
Year	Award	Category	Nominee(s)	Result	Ref.
2025	31st Forqué Awards	Best Documentary Film		Won	
2026	81st CEC Medals	Best Documentary Film		Won	
2026	40th Goya Awards	Best Documentary		Nominated	
2026	40th Goya Awards	Best Original Song	"Flores para Antonio" by Alba Flores and Sílvia Pérez Cruz	Won	
2026	9th ALMA Awards	Best Screenplay in a Documentary Film	Isaki Lacuesta, Elena Molina	Won	
2026	13th Platino Awards	Best Documentary		Pending	

== See also ==
- List of Spanish films of 2025
