= Goya Award for Best Original Song =

Annual award by the Spanish Film Academy

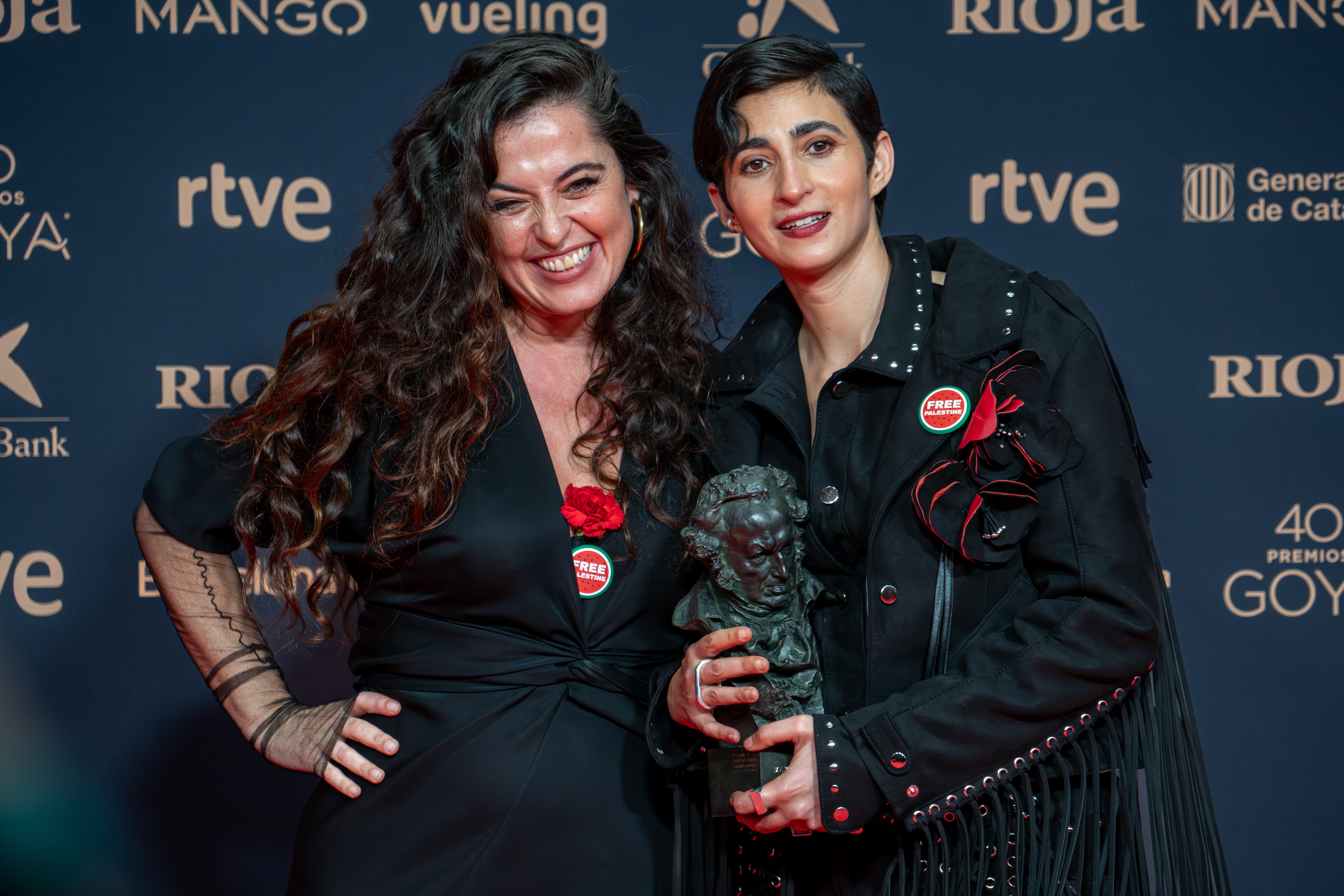
- The 2026 recipients: Sílvia Pérez Cruz and Alba Flores
- Native name: Premio Goya a la mejor canción original
- Awarded for: Best original song written specifically for a Spanish film of the year
- Country: Spain
- Presented by: Academy of Cinematographic Arts and Sciences of Spain (AACCE)
- First award: 15th Goya Awards (2000)
- Most recent winner: "Flores para Antonio" by Alba Flores and Sílvia Pérez Cruz; Flores para Antonio (2025)
- Website: Official website

The Goya Award for Best Original Song (Spanish: Premio Goya a la mejor canción original) is one of the Goya Awards presented annually by the Academy of Cinematographic Arts and Sciences of Spain (AACCE) since the 15th edition of the awards in 2000. It is presented to the songwriters who have composed an outstanding original song written specifically for a Spanish film.

Spanish singer Leiva is the only person who has won the award more than once with two wins: in 2017 for "La llamada" from the musical Holy Camp! and in 2022 for "Sintiéndolo mucho" from the documentary Sintiéndolo Mucho. Composer Roque Baños holds the record of most nominations in the category with four nominations, followed by Joaquín Sabina and Luis Ivars, each with three nominations.

Directors David Trueba, Rodrigo Cortés, Emilio Aragón, Paula Ortiz, Pablo Berger, Paco León, Paul Urkijo, Isaki Lacuesta and Antón Álvarez, all have been nominated as writers of co-writers for songs from their films, with Berger winning the award in 2012 for the song "No te puedo encontrar" from his film Blancanieves and Álvarez winning in 2025 for the song "Los almendros" from the documentary film The Flamenco Guitar of Yerai Cortés.

For the 39th ceremony, the AACCE introduced a modification consisting of the requirement of a declaration signed by the producers accrediting the non-submission of AI-generated compositions.

== Winners and nominees ==
=== 2000s ===
Year	English film title	Original film title	Song title	Recipient(s)
2000 (15th)	Fugitives	Fugitivas	"Fugitivas"	Manuel Malou, Natboccara and JJ Chaleco
2000 (15th)	The Art of Dying	El arte de morir	"El arte de morir"	Alfonso Pérez, Suso Sáiz, Cristina Lliso and Tito Fargo
2000 (15th)	Gitano		"Gitano"	Arturo Pérez Reverte and Abigail Marcet
2000 (15th)	Km. 0		"Km. 0"	Ismael Serrano
2001 (16th)	El bosque animado, sentirás su magia		"Tu bosque animado"	Luz Casal and Pablo Guerrero
2001 (16th)	Ten Days Without Love	El cielo abierto	"Again"	Olga Román
2001 (16th)	Torrente 2: Misión en Marbella		"Semos diferentes"	Joaquín Sabina
2001 (16th)	Mine Alone	Sólo mía	"Sólo mía"	Eusebio Bonilla and Clara Montes
2002 (17th)	Salomé		"Sevillana para Carlos"	Roque Baños
2002 (17th)	Arderás conmigo		"Ojos de gacela"	Eva Gancedo and Rasha
2002 (17th)	Dragon Hill, la colina del dragón		"Un lugar más allá"	Emilio Alquezar and Manuel Cubedo Fort
2002 (17th)	Guerreros		"Human Monkeys"	Najwajean
2003 (18th)	My Life Without Me	Mi vida sin mí	"Humans Like You"	Chop Suey
2003 (18th)	Atraco a las 3... y media		"Atraco a tu corazón"	Paco Ortega
2003 (18th)	Carmen		"Cuando me maten"	José Nieto
2003 (18th)	The Witch Affair	Cosa de brujas	"Just Sorcery"	Mario de Benito and Richelieu Morris
2004 (19th)	El milagro de Candeal		"Zambie Mameto"	Carlinhos Brown and Mateus
2004 (19th)	Tuna and Chocolate	Atún y chocolate	"Atunes en el paraíso"	Javier Ruibal
2004 (19th)	Swindled	Incautos	"Corre"	Bebe
2004 (19th)	Isi-Disi, Rough Love	Isi/Disi. Amor a lo bestia	"La rubia de la cuarta fila"	Joaquín Sabina
2005 (20th)	Princesas		"Me llaman calle"	Manu Chao
2005 (20th)	Sinfín		"Laura"	Dani Martín
2005 (20th)	The Night of the Brother	La noche del hermano	"Los malos amores"	Eva Gancedo and Yamil
2005 (20th)	Bagdad Rap		"Llora por tus miserias"	Mario Gaitán
2006 (21st)	The Education of Fairies	La educación de las hadas	"Tiempo pequeño"	Bebe and Lucio Godoy
2006 (21st)	DarkBlueAlmostBlack	Azuloscurocasinegro	"Imaginarte"	Alba Gárate
2006 (21st)	Welcome Home	Bienvenido a casa	"Duermen los niños"	Javier Limón, Andrés Calamaro and David Trueba
2006 (21st)	The Near East	El próximo Oriente	"Shockal Fire Ash"	Juan Bardem and Qazi Abdur Rahim
2007 (22nd)	Fados		"Fado da saudade"	Fernando Pinto do Amaral and Carlos do Carmo
2007 (22nd)	The Contestant	Concursante	"Circus Honey Blues"	Víctor Reyes and Rodrigo Cortés
2007 (22nd)	Cándida		"La vida secreta de las pequeñas cosas"	David Broza and Jorge Drexler
2007 (22nd)	The Mud Boy	El niño de barro	"Pequeño paria"	Daniel Melingo
2008 (23rd)	The One-Handed Trick	El truco del manco	"A tientas"	Woulfrank Zannou and Juan Manuel Montilla "Langui"
2008 (23rd)	My Prison Yard	El patio de mi cárcel	"Podemos volar juntos"	Raúl Sánchez Zafra and Juan Pablo Compaired
2008 (23rd)	Return to Hansala	Retorno a Hansala	"Manousal"	Tao Gutiérrez
2008 (23rd)	One Word from You	Una palabra tuya	"Entre tu balcón y mi ventana"	Javier Laguna, José Ángel Taboada and Antonio Manuel Mellado
2009 (24th)	Yo, también		"Yo, también"	Guille Milkyway
2009 (24th)	Guts	Agallas	"Agallas vs. Escamas"	Javier Echániz, Juan Antonio Gil, Xavi Font and Arturo Vaquero
2009 (24th)	Planet 51	Planeta 51	"Stick it to the Man"	Tom Cawte
2009 (24th)	Spanish Movie		"Spanish Song"	Gorka Hernando Menchaca

=== 2010s ===
Year	English film title	Original film title	Song title	Recipient(s)
2010 (25th)	Lope		"Que el soneto nos tome por sorpresa"	Jorge Drexler
2010 (25th)	Buried (Enterrado)		"In the Lap of the Mountain"	Víctor Reyes and Rodrigo Cortés
2010 (25th)	Room in Rome	Habitación en Roma	"Loving Strangers"	Russian Red
2010 (25th)	Paper Birds	Pájaros de papel	"No se puede vivir con un franco"	Emilio Aragón
2011 (26th)	The Sleeping Voice	La voz dormida	"Nana de la hierbabuena"	Carmen Agredano
2011 (26th)	Chrysalis	De tu ventana a la mía	"Debajo del limón"	Paula Ortiz, Avshalom Caspi and Pachi García "Alis"
2011 (26th)	Maktub		"Nuestra playa eres tú"	Jorge Pérez Quintero, Borja Jiménez Mérida and Patricio Martín Díaz
2011 (26th)	Verbo		"Verbo"	Pascal Gaigne and Ignacio Fornés Olmo "Nach"
2012 (27th)	Blancanieves		"No te puedo encontrar"	Pablo Berger and Juan Gómez "Chicuelo"
2012 (27th)	The Wild Ones	Els Nens Salvatges (Los niños salvajes)	"Líneas paralelas"	Pablo Cervantes Gutiérrez and Pablo José Fernández Brenes
2012 (27th)	La banda Picasso		"L'as tu vue?"	Alfonso Albacete and Juan Bardem Aguado
2012 (27th)	Tad, The Lost Explorer	Las aventuras de Tadeo Jones	"Te voy a espera"	Juan Magán
2013 (28th)	Family United	La gran familia española	"Do You Really Want to Be in Love?"	Josh Rouse
2013 (28th)	15 Years and One Day	15 años y un día	"Rap 15 años y un día"	Arón Piper, Pablo Salinas and Cecilia Fernández Blanco
2013 (28th)	A Night in Old Mexico	Una noche en el Viejo México	"Aquí sigo"	Emilio Aragón and Julieta Venegas
2013 (28th)	Alegrías de Cádiz		"De cerca del mar"	Fernando Arduán
2014 (29th)	El Niño		"Niño sin miedo"	India Martínez, Riki Rivera and David Santisteban
2014 (29th)	Haz de tu vida una obra de arte		"Me ducho en tus besos"	Fernando Merinero, Luis Ivars and Raúl Marín
2014 (29th)	Mortadelo and Filemon: Mission Implausible	Mortadelo y Filemón contra Jimmy el Cachondo	"Morta y File"	Rafael Arnau
2014 (29th)	Spanish Affair	Ocho apellidos vascos	"No te marches más"	Fernando Velázquez
2015 (30th)	Palm Trees in the Snow	Palmeras en la nieve	"Palmeras en la nieve"	Lucas Vidal and Pablo Alborán
2015 (30th)	El país del miedo		"So Far and Yet So Close"	Antonio Meliveo
2015 (30th)	Killing Time	Matar el tiempo	"Como el tiempo me mata"	Luis Ivars
2015 (30th)	Food and Shelter	Techo y comida	"Techo y comida"	Daniel Quiñones Perulero and Miguel Carabante Manzano
2016 (31st)	At Your Doorstep	Cerca de tu casa	"Ai, ai, ai"	Sílvia Pérez Cruz
2016 (31st)	Bollywood Made in Spain		"Descubriendo India"	Luis Ivars
2016 (31st)	Frágil equilibrio		"Muerte"	Zeltia Montes
2016 (31st)	Kiki, Love to Love	Kiki, el amor se hace	"KIKI - Mr.K! feat Nita"	Alejandro Acosta, Cristina Manjón, David Borràs Paronella, Marc Peña Rius and Paco León
2017 (32nd)	Holy Camp!	La llamada	"La llamada"	José Miguel Conejo "Leiva"
2017 (32nd)	The Motiv	El autor	"Algunas veces"	José Luis Perales
2017 (32nd)	The Bookshop	La librería	"Feeling Lonely on a Sunday Afternoon"	Alfonso de Vilallonga
2017 (32nd)	Rescue Under Fire	Zona hostil	"Rap Zona Hostil"	Roque Baños
2018 (33rd)	Champions	Campeones	"Este es el momento"	Coque Malla
2018 (33rd)	Carmen & Lola	Carmen y Lola	"Me vas a extrañar"	Paco de la Rosa
2018 (33rd)	The Man Who Killed Don Quixote	El hombre que mató a Don Quixote	"Tarde azul de abril"	Roque Baños and Tessy Díez Martín
2018 (33rd)	Everybody Knows	Todos lo saben	"Una de esas noches sin final"	Javier Limón
2019 (34th)	Out in the Open	Intemperie	"Intemperie"	Javier Ruibal
2019 (34th)	Klaus		"Invisible"	Caroline Pennell, Jussi Ilmari Karvinen and Justin Tranter
2019 (34th)	The Innocence	La inocencia	"Allí en la arena"	Toni M. Mir
2019 (34th)	The Night of the Two Moons	La noche de las dos lunas	"Nana de las dos lunas"	Sergio de la Puente

=== 2020s ===
Year	English film title	Original film title	Song title	Recipient(s)
2020 (35th)	Rosa's Wedding	La boda de Rosa	"Que no, que no"	María Rozalén
2020 (35th)	Adú		"Sabadoo"	Cherif Badua and Roque Baños
2020 (35th)	The Summer We Lived	El verano que vivimos	"El verano que vivimos"	Alejandro Sanz and Alfonso Pérez Arias
2020 (35th)	Schoolgirls	Las niñas	"Lunas de papel"	Carlos Naya
2021 (36th)	Mediterraneo: The Law of the Sea	Mediterráneo	"Te espera el mar"	María José Llergo
2021 (36th)	Álbum de posguerra		"Burst Out"	Àngel Leiro, Jean-Paul Dupeyron and Xavier Capellas
2021 (36th)	The Cover	El Cover	"Que me busquen por dentro"	Antonio Orozco and Jordi Colell Pinillos
2021 (36th)	Outlaws	Las leyes de la frontera	"Las leyes de la frontera"	Alejandro García Rodríguez, Antonio Molinero León, Daniel Escortell Blandino, José Manuel Cabrera Escot, Miguel García Cantero (Derby Motoreta's Burrito Kachimba)
2022 (37th)	Sintiéndolo mucho		"Sintiéndolo mucho"	Joaquín Sabina and Leiva
2022 (37th)	On the Fringe	En los márgenes	"En los márgenes"	Eduardo Cruz and María Rozalén
2022 (37th)	Irati		"Izena duena bada"	Aránzazu Calleja, Maite Arroitajauregi "Mursego" and Paul Urkijo Alijo
2022 (37th)	La vida chipén		"Un paraíso en el sur"	Paloma Peñarrubia Ruiz and Vanesa Benítez Zamora
2022 (37th)	Unicorn Wars		"Batalla"	Joseba Beristain
2023 (38th)	Love & Revolution	Te estoy amando locamente	"Yo solo quiero amor"	Rigoberta Bandini
2023 (38th)	Friends Till Death	Amigos hasta la muerte	"Eco"	Xoel López
2023 (38th)	Chinas, a Second Generation Story	Chinas	"Chinas"	Marina Herlop
2023 (38th)	Andrea's Love	El amor de Andrea	"El amor de Andrea"	Vetusta Morla (Álvaro B. Baglietto, David García, Guille Galván, Jorge González, Juan Pedro Martín "Pucho", Juanma Latorre), Valeria Castro
2023 (38th)	The Permanent Picture	La imatge permanent	"La gallinita"	Fernando Moreri Haberman, Sergio Bertran
2024 (39th)	The Flamenco Guitar of Yerai Cortés	La guitarra flamenca de Yerai Cortés	"Los almendros"	Antón Álvarez and Yerai Cortés
2024 (39th)	Buffalo Kids		"Show Me"	Fernando Velázquez
2024 (39th)	The 47	El 47	"El borde del mundo"	Valeria Castro
2024 (39th)	The Red Virgin	La virgen roja	"La virgen roja"	Maria Arnal
2024 (39th)	Saturn Return	Segundo premio	"Love Is the Worst"	Alondra Bentley, Isaki Lacuesta
2025 (40th)	Flores para Antonio		"Flores para Antonio"	Alba Flores, Sílvia Pérez Cruz
2025 (40th)	White Roses, Fall!	¡Caigan las rosas blancas!	"La Arepera"	Paloma Peñarrubia Ruiz
2025 (40th)	Hasta que me quede sin voz		"Hasta que me quede sin voz"	Leiva
2025 (40th)	The Dinner	La cena	"Y mientras tanto, canto"	Víctor Manuel
2025 (40th)	Hidden Murder	Parecido a un asesinato	"Caminar el tiempo"	Blanca Paloma Ramos, Jose Pablo Polo, Luis Ivars
