= Ramón Arroyo (athlete) =

Spanish athlete

- Born: Ramón Arroyo Prieto; 1971 (age 54–55); Bilbao, Biscay, Spain
- Citizenship: Spanish
- Occupation: Athlete
- Known for: Winning a ironman with multiple sclerosis

Ramón Arroyo Prieto (born 1971) is a Basque athlete, diagnosed with multiple sclerosis, with an extraordinary story of personal improvement, which was made into a film in 2016.

== Biography ==
After he was diagnosed with multiple sclerosis in 2004 and told by the first neurologist who treated him to "do nothing, stay at home and not ask for help from any association because they would not be able to help me", Arroyo's initial reaction was to ignore it, which "took its toll on me, both physically and mentally". Furthermore, the neurologist him that sport was counterproductive because it would raise my body temperature, which was fatal to his condition, and assured him that he would not be able to run the 100 metres. He turned his back on his illness and "stepped on the accelerator of my life to the fullest", getting married and becoming a father for the first time. After four years of denial, however, the birth of his first son helped him to see reality in a different way, when he decided to run his first 100 meters, from home to the subway station, which ended up being the catalyst for him to start training in order to be able to carry out various personal challenges in the world of athletics.

Encouraged by his brother-in-law, he ran in his first popular race and was immediately "hooked"; however, due to his physical limitations, he could not run faster, so he evolved towards the long distance. Meters gave way to kilometers and popular races to marathons, and he managed to finish his first marathon in Madrid. Encouraged by his friend and physical trainer, Julio Castells, he tried the triathlon and became "addicted" to it, because due to his physical problems, combining running with swimming and cycling was very beneficial to him, because he avoided muscle overload. The jump to Ironman began after he met a recently diagnosed boy in the hospital who had only been shown the rawest side of the disease, and in 2013 in Calella, he managed to overcome his first Ironman (an athletic test consisting of 3.86 kilometers of swimming, 180 kilometers of cycling, and 42.2 kilometers of running), which went viral. After his heroics in Calella, "they dedicated a Robinson Report program to me and, as a result of that report, they commissioned me to write a book".

In 2016, three years after overcoming that challenge, his story of personal improvement inspired the film "100 Meters", directed by Marcel Barrena and starring Dani Rovira, Alexandra Jiménez, and Karra Elejalde, with the aim of normalizing this degenerative disease. He participated in the entire process and his opinion, which was mostly to escape any sweetened version of his story, was taken into account, explaining to Dani what his limp was like. In Spain, it was released in cinemas, but in the rest of the world, it was distributed by Netflix for its international exploitation. From then on, Arroyo became a reference for those who, like him, suffer from a chronic illness. His story gave visibility to a disease as unknown as multiple sclerosis, and he even joined the Barajas Running Club to prepare for awareness of his disease about which there was little information when he first got diagnosed. He later stated that his disease changed his life "for the better. It has brought us many good things, especially the number of people we have been able to help".

After that first challenge, he participated in other similar competitions, such as the New York Marathon, the Madrid Half Marathon twice, the Lanzarote Ironman (the swimming and cycling segments), the Lanzarote Ironman 70.3 and the Half Marathon from Salou.
