= Kiki, Love to Love =

2016 Spanish comedy film directed by Paco León

- Film poster
- Spanish: Kiki, el amor se hace
- Directed by: Paco León
- Screenplay by: Paco León; Fernando Pérez
- Based on: The Little Death by Josh Lawson
- Produced by: Ghislain Barrois; Álvaro Augustin; Andrés Martín
- Starring: Alex García; Natalia de Molina; Paco León; Ana Katz; Belén Cuesta; Candela Peña; Luis Callejo; Luis Bermejo; Mari Paz Sayago; Alexandra Jiménez; David Mora
- Cinematography: Kiko de la Rica
- Edited by: Alberto de Toro
- Production companies: Telecinco Cinema; Vértigo Films
- Distributed by: Vértigo Films
- Release date: 1 April 2016
- Running time: 1h 42min
- Country: Spain
- Language: Spanish

Kiki, Love to Love (Spanish: Kiki, el amor se hace) is a 2016 Spanish sex comedy film directed by Paco León. It is a remake of the Australian film The Little Death.

== Cast ==
- Paco León as Paco
- Ana Katz as Ana
- Natalia de Molina as Natalia
- Álex García as Alejandro
- Candela Peña as María Candelaria Rodríguez Costa
- Belén Cuesta as Belén
- Luis Callejo as Antonio
- Luis Bermejo
- Alexandra Jiménez
- Mari Paz Sayago
- David Mora

== Production ==
Penned by Paco León and Fernando Pérez, the screenplay is a remake of the 2014 Australian film The Little Death by Josh Lawson. The film is a Telecinco Cinema and Vértigo Films production, and it had the participation of Mediaset España and Movistar+. Shooting started on 10 August 2015 in Madrid.

== Release ==
Distributed by Vértigo Films, the film was theatrically released on 1 April 2016.

== Reception ==
Jonathan Holland of The Hollywood Reporter summed up the film as "feel-good fun, interestingly twisted".

Andrea G. Bermejo of Cinemanía rated the film 4 out of 5 stars, finding (positively) surprising "the elegance with which Paco León tells his stories, the warm photography, the comedy, and the careful aesthetics of the film".

== Accolades ==
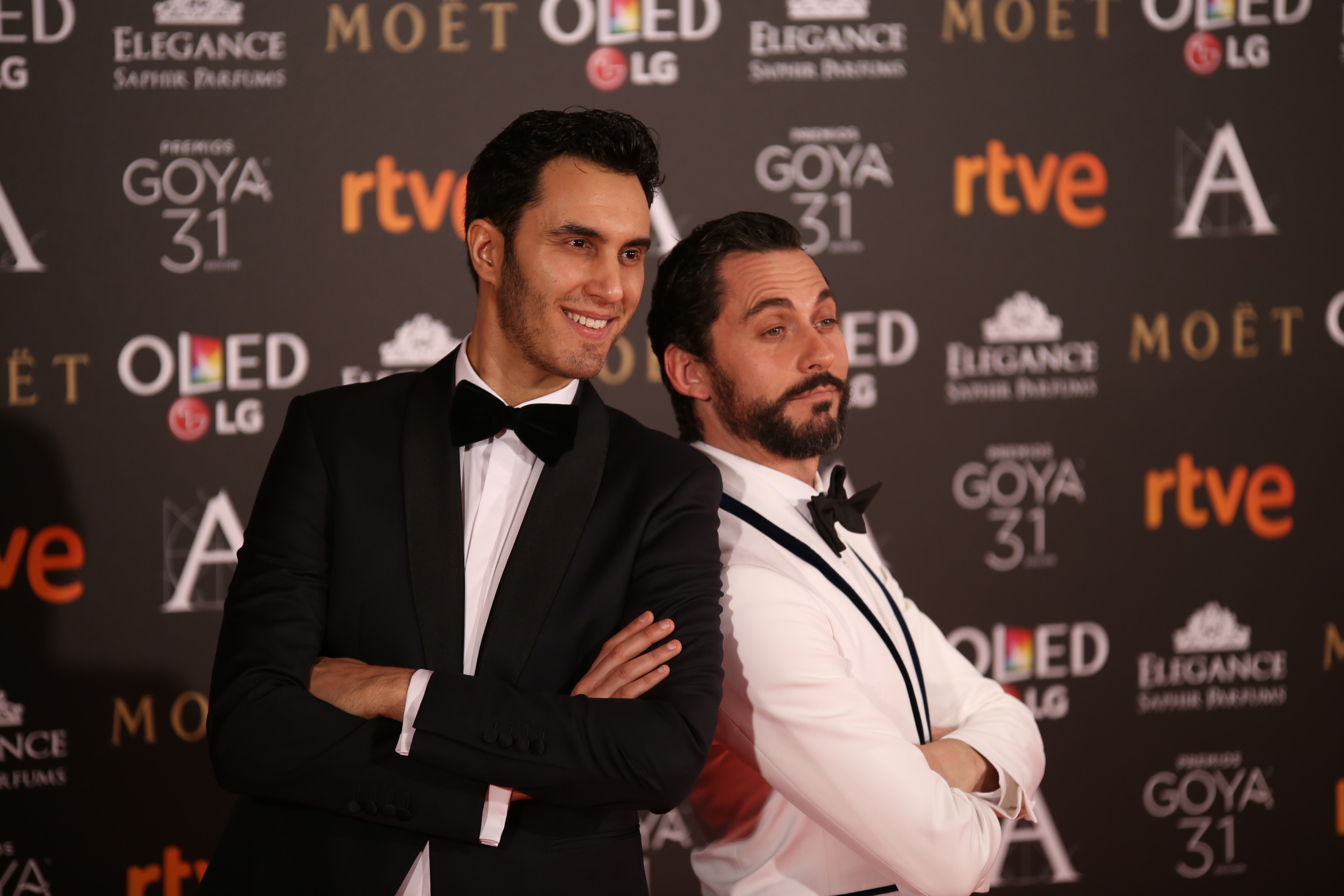
Co-writers Fernando Pérez and Paco León attending the 31st Goya Awards.

Year	Award	Category	Nominee(s)	Result	Ref.
2017	4th Feroz Awards	Best Comedy Film		Won	
2017	4th Feroz Awards	Best Supporting Actress	Candela Peña	Nominated	
2017	4th Feroz Awards	Best Trailer	Rafael Martínez	Won	
2017	4th Feroz Awards	Best Film Poster	Álvaro León Acosta, Luis León Acosta, Virginia Velasco Ramírez	Nominated	
2017	31st Goya Awards	Best Adapted Screenplay	Fernando Pérez, Paco León	Nominated	
2017	31st Goya Awards	Best Supporting Actress	Candela Peña	Nominated	
2017	31st Goya Awards	Best New Actress	Belén Cuesta	Nominated	
2017	31st Goya Awards	Best Original Song	"KIKI" - Mr.K! feat Nita; composed by Alejandro Acosta, Cristina Manjón, David Borràs Paronella, Marc Peña Rius, Paco León	Nominated	
2017	26th Actors and Actresses Union Awards	Best Film Actress in a Secondary Role	Candela Peña	Won	

== See also ==
- List of Spanish films of 2016
