= The Night My Mother Killed My Father =

- Theatrical release poster
- Spanish: La noche que mi madre mató a mi padre
- Directed by: Inés París
- Screenplay by: Inés París; Fernando Colomo (collab.)
- Produced by: Beatriz de la Gándara
- Starring: Belén Rueda; Diego Peretti; María Pujalte; Fele Martínez; Patricia Montero; Eduard Fernández
- Cinematography: Néstor Calvo
- Edited by: Ángel H. Zoido
- Music by: Arnau Bataller
- Production companies: La Noche Movie AIE; Sangam Films; Post Eng Producciones
- Distributed by: Festival Films
- Release dates: 23 April 2016 (Málaga); 29 April 2016 (Spain)
- Running time: 1h 34min
- Country: Spain
- Language: Spanish

The Night My Mother Killed My Father (Spanish: La noche que mi madre mató a mi padre) is a 2016 Spanish comedy film directed by Inés París. It stars Belén Rueda, Diego Peretti, María Pujalte, Fele Martínez, Patricia Montero, and Eduard Fernández.

== Cast ==
- Belén Rueda as Isabel Paris
- Diego Peretti as Diego Peretti
- Eduard Fernández as Ángel
- María Pujalte as Susana
- Fele Martínez as Carlos
- Patricia Montero as Álex

== Production ==
The film is a La Noche Movie AIE, Sangam Films, Post Eng Producciones production and it had the participation of TVE, Movistar+, and Crea SGR and backing from ICAA and Cultura Arts. It was shot in Valencia.

== Release ==
The film was presented in the official selection slate of the 19th Málaga Film Festival on 23 April 2016. Distributed by Festival Films, it was released theatrically in Spain on 29 April 2016.

== Critical reception ==
Jonathan Holland of The Hollywood Reporter underscored the film to be "a slick, satisfying Spanish screwballer".

== Accolades ==
Year	Award	Category	Nominee(s)	Result	Ref.
2017	4th Feroz Awards	Best Comedy Film		Nominated	

== See also ==
- List of Spanish films of 2016
