= Javier Ruibal =

Spanish musician and songwriter (born 1955)

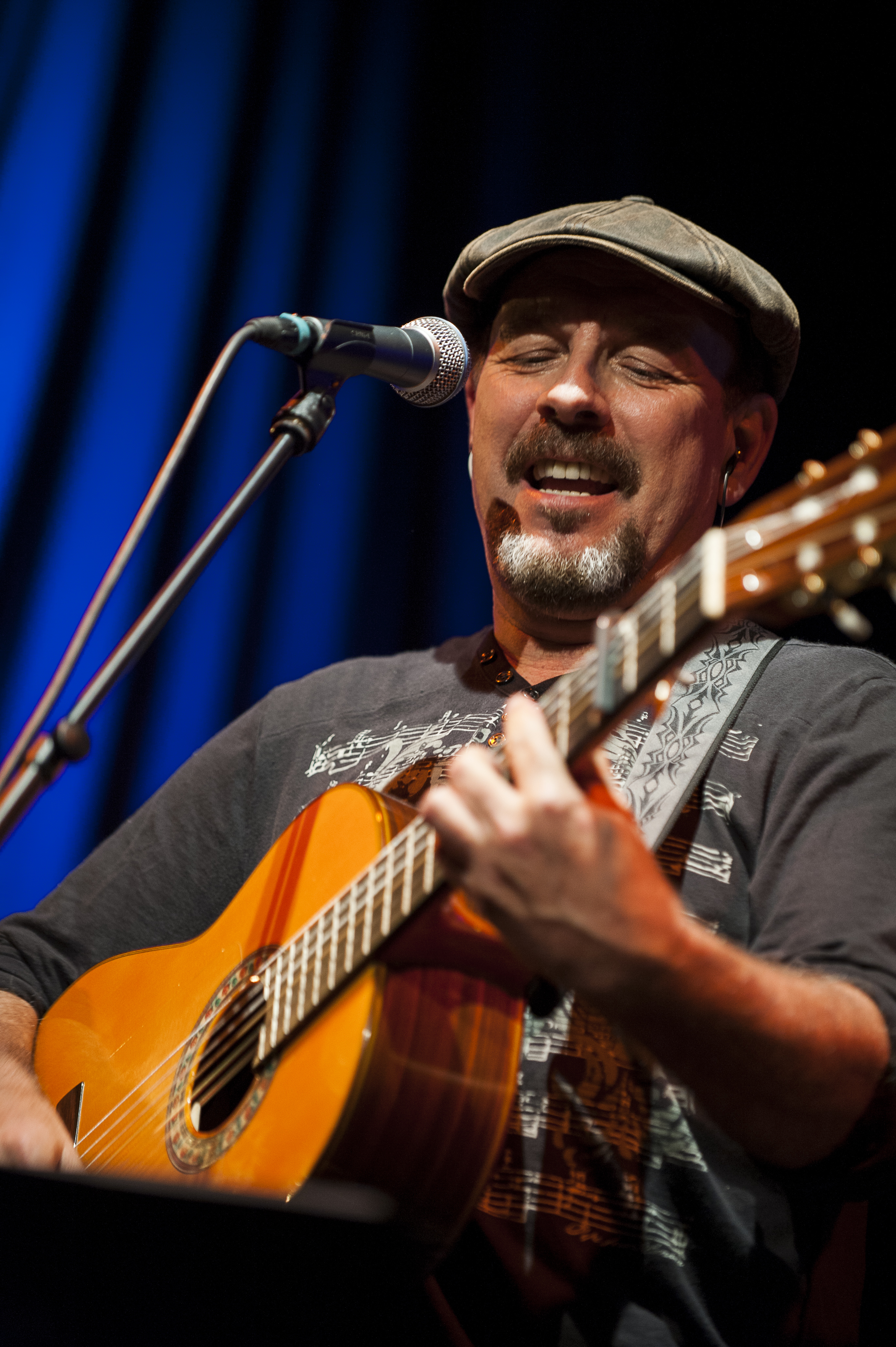

Background information
- Born: Francisco Javier Ruibal de Flores Calero; May 15, 1955; El Puerto de Santa María, Spain
- Genres: Flamenco, singer-songwriter
- Occupations: Musician, composer, poet, singer-songwriter
- Instruments: Guitar, voice
- Years active: 1980–present
- Labels: Lo Suyo S.L.
- Website: www.javierruibal.com

Francisco Javier Ruibal de Flores Calero (born May 15, 1955) is a Spanish musician and songwriter.

== Biography ==
Javier Ruibal was born in El Puerto de Santa María, in the province of Cádiz in southern Spain. His first album, called Duna, was released in 1983. He is highly regarded for his vocal talent and for blending the musical traditions of flamenco, jazz, and the Maghreb to develop his own personal style.

He plays the guitar and is usually accompanied by another guitar player, first Antonio Toledo and since around 2000 Tito Alcedo, and occasionally by more musicians such as John Parsons, Jorge Pardo and Chano Domínguez. He has ventured beyond Spain to appear at venues in Algeria, England, the West Bank, and New York City.

Ruibal has composed music for several other Spanish artists and famous singers; some, such as Ana Belén or David Broza, have sung his compositions. He also appeared on stage together with artists' such as Pablo Milanés, Joaquín Sabina, and Carlos Cano.

In 2007, he was awarded the Medal of Andalusia by the autonomous government of Andalusia. In 2009, he was chosen to give the opening address of the Cádiz Carnaval celebration. In 2020, Javier Ruibal's song Intemperie was awarded the prize for the best original song (in the movie Intemperie by Benito Zambrano) at the Goya Awards, sometimes dubbed the "Spanish Oscars".

== Works ==
- Duna (1983, Hispavox)
- Cuerpo Celeste (1986, Ariola)
- La Piel De Sara (1989, Ariola)
- Pensión Triana (1994, Lollipop)
- Contrabando (1997, PDI)
- Las Damas Primero (2001, 18 Chulos)
- Sáhara (2003, World Music Network)
- Lo Que Me Dice Tu Boca (2005, 18 Chulos)
- Pensión Triana – Special Edition (2010, 18 Chulos)
- Sueño (2011, 18 Chulos)
- Quedate Conmigo (2013, Lo Suyo)
- 35 aniversario (2016, Lo Suyo)
- Paraísos Mejores (2018, Lo Suyo)
