= At Your Doorstep =

- Theatrical release poster
- Spanish: Cerca de tu casa
- Directed by: Eduard Cortés
- Screenplay by: Piti Español; Eduard Cortés
- Produced by: Loris Omedes
- Starring: Sílvia Pérez Cruz; Adriana Ozores; Iván Massagué; Manuel Morón; Oriol Vila; Ivan Benet; Carla Fabregat; Lluís Homar
- Cinematography: David Omedes
- Edited by: Koldo Idígoras
- Music by: Sílvia Pérez Cruz
- Production company: Bausan Films
- Distributed by: A Contracorriente Films
- Release dates: 26 April 2016 (Málaga); 2 September 2016 (Spain)
- Country: Spain
- Language: Spanish

At Your Doorstep (Spanish: Cerca de tu casa) is a 2016 Spanish home eviction-themed musical drama film directed by Eduard Cortés which stars Sílvia Pérez Cruz.

== Plot ==
The plot tracks the plight of unemployed young woman Sonia, who moves in to her parents' home upon suffering a home eviction.

== Cast ==
- Sílvia Pérez Cruz as Sonia
- Adriana Ozores as Mercedes
- Iván Massagué as Dani
- Manuel Morón as Martín
- Ivan Benet as Jaime
- Oriol Vila as Pablo
- Montse Morillo as Lucía
- Victòria Pagès as directora del banco
- Lluís Homar as Tomás

== Production ==
The film is a Bausan Films production. Shooting locations included El Clot, Barcelona.

== Release ==
The film was presented at the 19th Málaga Film Festival on 28 April 2016. Distributed by A Contracorriente Films, it was released theatrically in Spain on 2 September 2016.

== Reception ==
Toni Vall of Cinemanía rated the film 3 out of 5 stars, underscoring it to be a "countercurrent allegory on the effects of the crisis.

Pere Vall of Fotogramas rated the film 3 out of 5 stars, highlighting Sílvia Pérez Cruz as the best thing about the film.

== Accolades ==
Year	Award	Category	Nominee(s)	Result	Ref.
2017	4th Feroz Awards	Best Original Score	Sílvia Pérez Cruz	Nominated	
2017	9th Gaudí Awards	Best Actress	Sílvia Pérez Cruz	Nominated	
2017	9th Gaudí Awards	Best Supporting Actress	Adriana Ozores	Nominated	
2017	9th Gaudí Awards	Best Original Score	Sílvia Pérez Cruz	Won	
2017	9th Gaudí Awards	Best Sound	Albert Manera, Xavier Mas	Nominated	
2017	31st Goya Awards	Best New Actress	Sílvia Pérez Cruz	Nominated	
2017	31st Goya Awards	Best Original Song	"Ai, ai, ai" by Sílvia Pérez Cruz	Won	
2017	26th Actors and Actresses Union Awards	Best Film Actress in a Secondary Role	Adriana Ozores	Nominated	

== See also ==
- List of Spanish films of 2016
