= The Open Door (2016 film) =

- Theatrical release poster
- Spanish: La puerta abierta
- Directed by: Marina Seresesky
- Written by: Marina Seresesky
- Produced by: Álvaro Lavín
- Starring: Carmen Machi; Terele Pávez; Asier Etxeandía
- Cinematography: Roberto Fernández
- Edited by: Raúl de Torres
- Music by: Mariano Marín
- Production companies: Meridional Producciones; Chester Media Producciones; Stop&Play; Babilonia Films; MilCiclos
- Distributed by: Pirámide Films
- Release dates: March 2016 (FICG); 2 September 2016 (Spain)
- Country: Spain
- Language: Spanish

The Open Door (Spanish: La puerta abierta) is a 2016 Spanish tragicomedy film written and directed by Marina Seresesky which stars Carmen Machi, Terele Pávez and Asier Etxeandia.

== Plot ==
Rosa (a prostitute), lives with her mother (a former prostitute which whom she does not get along) in a flat in Madrid. They are torn about adopting the daughter of another prostitute who died because of an overdose.

== Cast ==
- Carmen Machi as Rosa.
- Terele Pávez as Antonia.
- Asier Etxeandía as Lupita.
- Lucía Balas as Lyuba.
- Paco Tous as Paco.
- Sonia Almarcha as Juana.
- Yoima Valdés as Teresa.
- Hugo Ndiaye as Eduardito.
- Emilio Palacios as Yuri.
- Mar Saura as Policía Isabel.
- Christian Sánchez as Policía Carlos.
- Monika Kowalska as Masha.

== Production ==
Written and directed by Marina Seresesky, The Open Door is her feature film's directorial debut. The film was produced by Meridional Producciones and Chester Media Producciones alongside Stop&Play, Babilonia Films and MilCiclos, with the participation of Telemadrid. Shooting took place in Madrid, specifically in a corrala in the Calle de Santa Brígida from December 2014 to February 2015.

== Release ==
Prior to its theatrical release, the film screened at the Guadalajara Film Festival (FICG), the Sofia International Film Festival (SIFF) and the Transilvania International Film Festival (TIFF), among others. Distributed by Pirámide Films, The Open Door was theatrically released in Spain on 2 September 2016.

== Reception ==
Reviewing for The Hollywood Reporter, Jonathan Holland deemed the film to be "an admirably abrasive by-women-for-women drama that works just fine until it starts to pull its punches later on".

Pere Vall of Fotogramas gave the film 3 out of 5 stars, writing about the talented and (carefully directed) cast.

Quim Casas of El Periódico de Catalunya gave the film 2 out of 5 stars, considering that, good intentions notwithstanding, it belongs to a type of cinema that is already outdated, "solidarity between people on the edge (hookers, transvestites, drug addicts) and very little else".

Sergio F. Pinilla of Cinemanía gave it 3 out of 5 stars, noting an evolution from previous shorts films by Seresesky, who is right on betting on a less neutral than voyeuristic point of view.

== Awards and nominations ==
Year	Award	Category	Nominee(s)	Result	Ref.
2017	22nd Forqué Awards	Best Actress	Carmen Machi	Nominated	
2017	4th Feroz Awards	Best Comedy Film		Nominated	
2017	4th Feroz Awards	Best Actress (film)	Carmen Machi	Nominated	
2017	4th Feroz Awards	Best Supporting Actress (film)	Terele Pávez	Nominated	
2017	72nd CEC Medals	Best New Director	Marina Seresesky	Nominated	
2017	72nd CEC Medals	Best Actress	Carmen Machi	Nominated	
2017	72nd CEC Medals	Best Supporting Actress	Terele Pávez	Nominated	
2017	31st Goya Awards	Best Actress	Carmen Machi	Nominated	
2017	31st Goya Awards	Best Supporting Actress	Terele Pávez	Nominated	
2017	67th Fotogramas de Plata	Best Film Actress	Carmen Machi	Nominated	
2017	26th Actors and Actresses Union Awards	Best Film Actress in a Leading Role	Carmen Machi	Won	
2017	26th Actors and Actresses Union Awards	Best Film Actress in a Secondary Role	Terele Pávez	Nominated	
2017	26th Actors and Actresses Union Awards	Best Film Actor in a Secondary Role	Asier Etxeandia	Nominated	

== See also ==
- List of Spanish films of 2016
