= Smoke & Mirrors (2016 film) =

- Theatrical release poster
- Spanish: El hombre de las mil caras
- Directed by: Alberto Rodríguez
- Screenplay by: Rafael Cobos; Alberto Rodríguez
- Based on: Paesa, el espía de las mil caras by Manuel Cerdán
- Produced by: Antonio Asensio; José Antonio Félez; Mercedes Gamero; Gervasio Iglesias; Mikel Lejarza; Francisco Ramos
- Starring: Eduard Fernández; José Coronado; Marta Etura; Carlos Santos; Enric Benavent; Alba Galocha; Philippe Rebbot; Pedro Casablanc; Israel Elejalde; Tomás del Estal; Jons Pappila; Luis Callejo; Mireia Portas; Craig Stevenson; Emilio Gutiérrez Caba
- Cinematography: Alex Catalán
- Edited by: José M. G. Moyano
- Music by: Julio de la Rosa
- Production companies: Zeta Cinema; Atresmedia Cine; Atípica Films; Sacromonte
- Distributed by: Warner Bros. Pictures
- Release dates: 17 September 2016 (San Sebastián); 23 September 2016 (Spain)
- Running time: 123 minutes
- Country: Spain
- Language: Spanish

Smoke & Mirrors (Spanish: El hombre de las mil caras) is a 2016 Spanish thriller film directed by Alberto Rodríguez based on the 2006 non-fiction book Paesa, el espía de las mil caras by Manuel Cerdán. The film stars Eduard Fernández as Francisco Paesa, a former agent of the Spanish secret service who faked his own death after an infamous corruption scandal.

== Plot ==
Francisco Paesa — an ex-secret agent for the Spanish government who was instrumental in the most important operation against the Basque terrorist group ETA — is framed by his own government and forced to leave the country. When he is finally able to return to Spain, he is broke and his personal life is falling apart. It is then he receives a visit from Luis Roldán, the powerful former Commissioner of Police who offers him one million dollars for help with safeguarding twelve million dollars embezzled by Roldán from the police budget. Paesa plans revenge in order to seize Roldán's money, fooling an entire country in a brilliant and intricate operation worthy of the best illusionist.

== Cast ==
- Eduard Fernández as Francisco Paesa
- José Coronado as Jesús Camoes
- Marta Etura as Nieves Fernández Puerto
- Carlos Santos as Luis Roldán
- Enric Benavent as Casturelli
- Alba Galocha as Beatriz
- Philippe Rebbot as Jean-Pierre Pinaud
- Pedro Casablanc as Abogado de Paesa
- Israel Elejalde as González
- Tomás del Estal as Bermejo
- Jons Pappila as Arlauckas
- Luis Callejo as Juan Alberto Belloch
- Mireia Portas as Gloria
- Craig Stevenson as Georges Starckman
- Emilio Gutiérrez Caba as Osorno
- Christian Stamm as Hans
- Ramón Rados as Rafael Vera
- Agustín Galiana as Tipo Filatelia

== Release ==
The film premiered at the 64th San Sebastián International Film Festival, where it was awarded the Silver Shell for Best Actor for Eduard Fernández. It was also screened at the 2016 London Film Festival. Distributed by Warner Bros. Pictures, it was released theatrically in Spain on 23 September 2016.

== Reception ==
Fausto Fernández of Fotogramas rated the film 4 out of 5 stars, singling out "the precision with which it is narrated and executed" as its hallmark.

Carlos Marañón of Cinemanía rated the film 4 out of 5 stars, assessing that "Rodriguez takes [the] Spanish political thriller [genre] to another level".

Jonathan Holland of The Hollywood Reporter deemed the film to be "quick-thinking, showy, ambitious and stylish in its manipulations; but also, for most of the duration, it's as soulless as a briefcase full of used banknotes".

Guy Lodge of Variety billed the film as a "slick-as-Brylcreem political thriller".

Lee Marshall of ScreenDaily underscored that "this overlong, over-detailed story never seems entirely sure what it's trying to say".

== Accolades ==
Year	Award	Category	Nominee(s)	Result	Ref.
2016	64th San Sebastián International Film Festival	Golden Shell for Best Film		Nominated	
2016	64th San Sebastián International Film Festival	Silver Shell for Best Actor	Eduard Fernández	Won	
2017	22nd Forqué Awards	Best Film		Nominated	
2017	22nd Forqué Awards	Best Actor	Eduard Fernández	Nominated	
2017	4th Feroz Awards	Best Drama Film		Nominated	
2017	4th Feroz Awards	Best Director	Alberto Rodríguez	Nominated	
2017	4th Feroz Awards	Best Screenplay	Alberto Rodríguez, Rafael Cobos	Nominated	
2017	4th Feroz Awards	Best Main Actor in a Film	Eduard Fernández	Nominated	
2017	4th Feroz Awards	Best Supporting Actor in a Film	Carlos Santos	Nominated	
2017	4th Feroz Awards	Best Supporting Actor in a Film	José Coronado	Nominated	
2017	4th Feroz Awards	Best Supporting Actress in a Film	Marta Etura	Nominated	
2017	4th Feroz Awards	Best Original Soundtrack	Julio de la Rosa	Nominated	
2017	4th Feroz Awards	Best Trailer		Nominated	
2017	4th Feroz Awards	Best Film Poster		Won	
2017	9th Gaudí Awards	Best Actor	Eduard Fernández	Won	
2017	31st Goya Awards	Best Film		Nominated	
2017	31st Goya Awards	Best Director	Alberto Rodríguez	Nominated	
2017	31st Goya Awards	Best Actor	Eduard Fernández	Nominated	
2017	31st Goya Awards	Best New Actor	Carlos Santos	Won	
2017	31st Goya Awards	Best Adapted Screenplay	Alberto Rodríguez, Rafael Cobos	Won	
2017	31st Goya Awards	Best Editing	José M.G. Moyano	Nominated	
2017	31st Goya Awards	Best Art Direction	Pepe Domínguez del Olmo	Nominated	
2017	31st Goya Awards	Best Production Supervision	Manuela Ocón	Nominated	
2017	31st Goya Awards	Best Sound	Daniel de Zayas, César Molina, José Antonio Manovel	Nominated	
2017	31st Goya Awards	Best Best Makeup and Hairstyles	Yolanda Piña	Nominated	
2017	31st Goya Awards	Best Original Score	Julio de la Rosa	Nominated	
2017	26th Actors and Actresses Union Awards	Best Film Actor in a Secondary Role	Carlos Santos	Won	
2017	4th Platino Awards	Best Ibero-American Film		Nominated	
2017	4th Platino Awards	Best Screenplay	Alberto Rodríguez, Rafael Cobos	Nominated	
2017	4th Platino Awards	Best Actor	Eduard Fernández	Nominated	
2017	4th Platino Awards	Best Sound	Daniel de Zayas, César Molina, José Antonio Manovel	Nominated	

== See also ==
- List of Spanish films of 2016
