= A Monster Calls (film) =

2016 dark fantasy drama film by J. A. Bayona

- Theatrical release poster
- Directed by: J. A. Bayona
- Screenplay by: Patrick Ness
- Based on: A Monster Calls by Patrick Ness (from an idea by Siobhan Dowd)
- Produced by: Belén Atienza
- Starring: Lewis MacDougall; Sigourney Weaver; Felicity Jones; Toby Kebbell; Liam Neeson
- Cinematography: Óscar Faura
- Edited by: Bernat Vilaplana; Jaume Martí
- Music by: Fernando Velázquez
- Production companies: Participant Media; River Road Entertainment; Apaches Entertainment; Telecinco Cinema; Peliculas La Trini
- Distributed by: Universal Pictures (Spain); Entertainment One Films (United Kingdom and Australia); Focus Features (United States); Lionsgate (International)
- Release dates: September 10, 2016 (TIFF); October 7, 2016 (Spain); January 1, 2017 (United Kingdom)
- Running time: 108 minutes
- Countries: Spain; United Kingdom; United States
- Language: English
- Budget: $43 million
- Box office: $47.3 million

A Monster Calls is a 2016 dark fantasy drama film directed by J. A. Bayona and starring Lewis MacDougall, Sigourney Weaver, Felicity Jones, Toby Kebbell, and Liam Neeson. Featuring a screenplay adapted by Patrick Ness from his own 2011 novel of the same name, the film follows a boy grappling with his mother's terminal illness who is visited and told stories by a giant anthropomorphic yew tree.

The film rights to Ness' novel were acquired by Focus Features in March 2014, after which he was hired as screenwriter and Bayona signed on as director. Jones was cast that April, Fanny joined the film in May, and the rest of the main roles were cast by September. Principal photography began on 30 September, with filming taking place primarily in West Yorkshire, Derbyshire, and Lancashire in England, as well as in Bayona's native Spain.

After premiering on 10 September 2016 at the Toronto International Film Festival, the film was theatrically released on 7 October in Spain by Universal Pictures, on 1 January 2017 in the United Kingdom by Entertainment One, and five days later in the United States by Focus Features. It received positive reviews from critics, with praise for Bayona's direction, the acting, the visual effects, and the thematic content, but underperformed at the box office, grossing $47 million worldwide.

== Plot ==
In rural England, 12-year-old Conor O'Malley has a close bond with his seriously ill mother. She asks his grandmother for help following her regular chemotherapy treatments, but Conor does not like his strict grandmother and is troubled by the plan for him to go live with her in the event of his mother's death, as his father lives in the United States and has a new wife and daughter.

At school, Conor is regularly tormented by his classmate Harry. He is also plagued by a nightmare in which the old church near his house collapses into a hole, and he tries desperately to hold on to his mother to prevent her from plummeting to her death. Conor vents his emotions by drawing, a skill he learned from his mother.

One night, at exactly seven minutes past midnight, Conor sees the large yew tree next to the church transform into a gnarled Monster and approach his home. The Monster says it will tell Conor three stories during their next meetings, after which Conor must tell the Monster the truth of his nightmare.

In the Monster's first story, a prince flees from his step-grandmother, the supposedly-evil queen. He then kills his sleeping beloved and scapegoats the queen so the people turn against her and make him king, where he rules benevolently. The Monster, knowing the truth, takes the innocent queen and hides her far away.

As Conor's mother worsens, he moves in with his grandmother. His father comes for a visit and takes Conor to an amusement park. He invites Conor to come spend Christmas with him, but Conor is disappointed, as he had hoped his father would ask him to move to America.

That evening, Conor summons the Monster by making the hands of his grandmother's prized grandfather clock display 12:07. In the Monster's second story, a hard-hearted parson forbids an apothecary from extracting medicine from an old yew tree, only to change his mind when his own children become ill. The apothecary refuses to help him, and the Monster begins to destroy the parson's house as punishment for giving up on his beliefs. Conor enthusiastically joins in on the destruction, and really destroys his grandmother's sitting room in a fit of frustration. When she returns, his grandmother, while shocked and upset, does not punish Conor.

The doctors try a final treatment. As it is derived from the yew, Conor implores the Monster to heal his mother, but the Monster dismisses the matter as outside of his responsibility, though he assures him if anything can cure his mother, it is the yew. At school, after Harry tells Conor he will no longer bother him because he "no longer sees him", the Monster tells his third story, a brief tale about a man no one sees who cannot stand it anymore, and calls a monster to punish everyone, only to end up more alone than ever. Conor angrily attacks Harry, hospitalizing him. To his disappointment, the head teacher, aware of his current home situation, refrains from punishing Conor.

When it becomes clear his mother will die despite the yew treatment, Conor runs to confront the Monster, who forces him to relive his recurring nightmare. His mother dangles from Conor's hand over the edge of the enormous sinkhole and then falls, disappearing into the void. The Monster repeatedly demands that Conor tell his story, saying it is the only way for him to be set free, but Conor steadfastly refuses, fearing the truth will kill him.

Eventually, Conor admits that in his nightmare he purposely lets go of his mother's hand when he could have held on for longer. He says he has long suspected his mother will not survive, and secretly hoped she would die to end their suffering, although, at the same time, he did not want her to die. The Monster commends Conor for his bravery in telling the truth and tells him that it is human to feel as he does.

Conor's grandmother finds him asleep under the tree and they come to an understanding as she takes him to the hospital. Conor embraces his mother, and they are joined by the Monster, whom his mother is also able to see. She dies at exactly seven minutes past midnight. Back at his grandmother's house, Conor learns his grandmother has refurbished his mother's old room for him. He finds his mother's childhood art book, which includes pictures of characters from the stories the Monster told him, as well as a drawing of his mother as a child on the Monster's shoulder.

== Cast ==
- Lewis MacDougall as Conor O'Malley
- Sigourney Weaver as Grandma, Conor's strict grandmother
- Felicity Jones as Conor's mother, who is undergoing treatment for an unspecified terminal illness
- Toby Kebbell as Conor's father, who is divorced from Conor's mother and now lives in the United States with his new wife and daughter
- James Melville as Harry, a school bully who frequently targets Conor
- Geraldine Chaplin as the principal at Conor's school
- Liam Neeson as the Monster, a giant humanoid yew tree. Neeson provided the Monster's voice and motion capture performance, while Tom Holland served as the stand-in for the Monster on set. Additionally, Neeson appears in the film in a photograph as Conor's grandfather.

== Production ==
Focus Features bought the rights to Patrick Ness' book in March 2014. Ness served as the film's screenwriter, with J. A. Bayona hired as director. Felicity Jones was cast on 23 April 2014, Liam Neeson was cast on 8 May, Sigourney Weaver was cast on 18 August, and Toby Kebbell was cast on 19 August. On 3 September, Ness tweeted that Lewis MacDougall had been cast in the lead role. Geraldine Chaplin joined the cast of the film on 30 September.

=== Filming ===
Principal photography began on 30 September 2014, and took place in Spain and Britain. On 9 October, filming began on location in Glossop, Preston, Lancashire (Ramsbottom), Rivington Pike (Chorley/Horwich), Blackpool Pleasure Beach, Colne Valley High School, Linthwaite, Huddersfield and Marsden, West Yorkshire.

Liam Neeson, who voices the film's titular tree creature, was not on set throughout the shooting process, having completed his motion-capture performance, with MacDougall in the room, during a two-week period beforehand. Actor Tom Holland, who had previously worked with Bayona on The Impossible (2012), worked on set as the stand-in for the Monster.

== Release ==
In the United States, the film was originally scheduled for an October 2016 release, before being rescheduled for a limited rollout on 23 December 2016, followed by a wide release on 6 January 2017. It was released in the United Kingdom on 1 January 2017 by Entertainment One and Lionsgate, and in India on 6 January 2017 by Relativity B4U.

== Reception ==
=== Box office ===
A Monster Calls grossed $3.7 million in the United States and Canada and $43.5 million in other territories for a worldwide total of $47.2 million, against a production budget of $43 million.

In North America, the film had its wide release alongside the opening of Underworld: Blood Wars and the wide expansions of Hidden Figures and Lion, and was initially expected to gross around $10 million from 1,523 theaters over the weekend. However, after making just $659,000 on its first day, weekend projections were lowered to $2 million, which it ended up grossing, finishing 13th at the box office. In its second weekend of wide release, the film grossed $537,262 (a drop of 74.2%), and in its third week, it made just $19,080 (a drop of 96.4%) after being pulled from all but 42 theaters, one of the biggest third week theater drops in history.

=== Critical response ===
On the review aggregator website Rotten Tomatoes, 86% of 266 critics' reviews are positive, with an average rating of 7.6/10. The website's consensus reads: "A Monster Calls deftly balances dark themes and fantastical elements to deliver an engrossing and uncommonly moving entry in the crowded coming-of-age genre." On Metacritic, the film has a weighted average score of 76 out of 100 based on reviews from 40 critics, indicating "generally favorable" reviews. Audiences polled by CinemaScore gave the film an average grade of "A" on an A+ to F scale.

=== Accolades ===
List of awards and nominations
Award	Date of ceremony	Category	Recipient(s)	Result	Ref(s)
AARP Annual Movies for Grownups Awards	6 February 2017	Best Supporting Actress	Sigourney Weaver	Nominated	
AARP Annual Movies for Grownups Awards	6 February 2017	Best Intergenerational Film	A Monster Calls	Nominated	
Camerimage	19 November 2016	Golden Frog Award for Best Cinematography	Óscar Faura	Nominated	
Critics' Choice Awards	11 December 2016	Best Young Performer	Lewis MacDougall	Nominated	
Critics' Choice Awards	11 December 2016	Best Visual Effects	A Monster Calls	Nominated	
Detroit Film Critics Society	19 December 2016	Best Supporting Actress	Felicity Jones	Nominated	
Empire Awards	19 March 2017	Best Sci-Fi/Fantasy	A Monster Calls	Won	
Empire Awards	19 March 2017	Best Male Newcomer	Lewis MacDougall	Nominated	
Evening Standard British Film Awards	8 December 2016	Breakthrough of the Year	Lewis MacDougall	Nominated	
Gaudí Awards	29 January 2017	Best Non-Catalan Language Film	A Monster Calls	Won	
Gaudí Awards	29 January 2017	Best Director	J. A. Bayona	Won	
Gaudí Awards	29 January 2017	Best Production Supervision	Sandra Hermida	Won	
Gaudí Awards	29 January 2017	Best Art Direction	Eugenio Caballero	Won	
Gaudí Awards	29 January 2017	Best Editing	Jaume Martí and Bernat Vilaplana	Won	
Gaudí Awards	29 January 2017	Best Original Music	Fernando Velázquez	Nominated	
Gaudí Awards	29 January 2017	Best Cinematography	Oscar Faura	Won	
Gaudí Awards	29 January 2017	Best Costume Design	Steven Noble	Nominated	
Gaudí Awards	29 January 2017	Best Sound	Oriol Tarragó, Peter Glossop, Marc Orts	Won	
Gaudí Awards	29 January 2017	Best Visual Effects	Félix Bergés, Pau Costa, David Martí, Montse Ribé	Won	
Golden Tomato Awards	12 January 2017	Best British Movie 2016	A Monster Calls	2nd Place	
Golden Tomato Awards	12 January 2017	Best Kids/Family Movie 2016	A Monster Calls	3rd Place	
Goya Awards	4 February 2017	Best Film	A Monster Calls	Nominated	
Goya Awards	4 February 2017	Best Director	J. A. Bayona	Won	
Goya Awards	4 February 2017	Best Supporting Actress	Sigourney Weaver	Nominated	
Goya Awards	4 February 2017	Best Adapted Screenplay	Patrick Ness	Nominated	
Goya Awards	4 February 2017	Best Original Score	Fernando Velázquez	Won	
Goya Awards	4 February 2017	Best Cinematography	Óscar Faura	Won	
Goya Awards	4 February 2017	Best Editing	Jaume Martí and Bernat Vilaplana	Won	
Goya Awards	4 February 2017	Best Production Supervision	Sandra Hermida Muniz	Won	
Goya Awards	4 February 2017	Best Art Direction	Eugenio Caballero	Won	
Goya Awards	4 February 2017	Best Makeup and Hairstyles	Marese Langan and David Martí	Won	
Goya Awards	4 February 2017	Best Sound	Peter Glossop, Marc Orts and Oriol Tarragó	Won	
Goya Awards	4 February 2017	Best Special Effects	Felix Bergés and Pau Costa	Won	
London Film Critics' Circle	22 January 2017	Young British/Irish Performer of the Year	Lewis MacDougall	Won	
Premios Feroz	23 January 2017	Best Drama Film	A Monster Calls	Nominated	
Premios Feroz	23 January 2017	Best Director	J. A. Bayona	Nominated	
Premios Feroz	23 January 2017	Best Screenplay	Patrick Ness	Nominated	
Premios Feroz	23 January 2017	Best Main Actor	Lewis MacDougall	Nominated	
Premios Feroz	23 January 2017	Best Original Soundtrack	Fernando Velázquez	Won	
Premios Feroz	23 January 2017	Best Trailer	A Monster Calls	Nominated	
Premios Feroz	23 January 2017	Best Film Poster	A Monster Calls	Nominated	
San Diego Film Critics Society	12 December 2016	Best Visual Effects	A Monster Calls	Nominated	
Saturn Awards	28 June 2017	Best Fantasy Film	A Monster Calls	Nominated	
Saturn Awards	28 June 2017	Best Performance by a Younger Actor	Lewis MacDougall	Nominated	
St. Louis Gateway Film Critics Association	18 December 2016	Best Visual Effects	A Monster Calls	Nominated	
Washington D.C. Area Film Critics Association	5 December 2016	Best Youth Performance	Lewis MacDougall	Nominated	
Washington D.C. Area Film Critics Association	5 December 2016	Best Adapted Screenplay	Patrick Ness	Nominated	
Washington D.C. Area Film Critics Association	5 December 2016	Best Voice Performance	Liam Neeson	Won	
Washington D.C. Area Film Critics Association	5 December 2016	Best Motion Capture Performance	Liam Neeson	Nominated	

== See also ==
- I Kill Giants
