= Betsy Túrnez =

Spanish actress

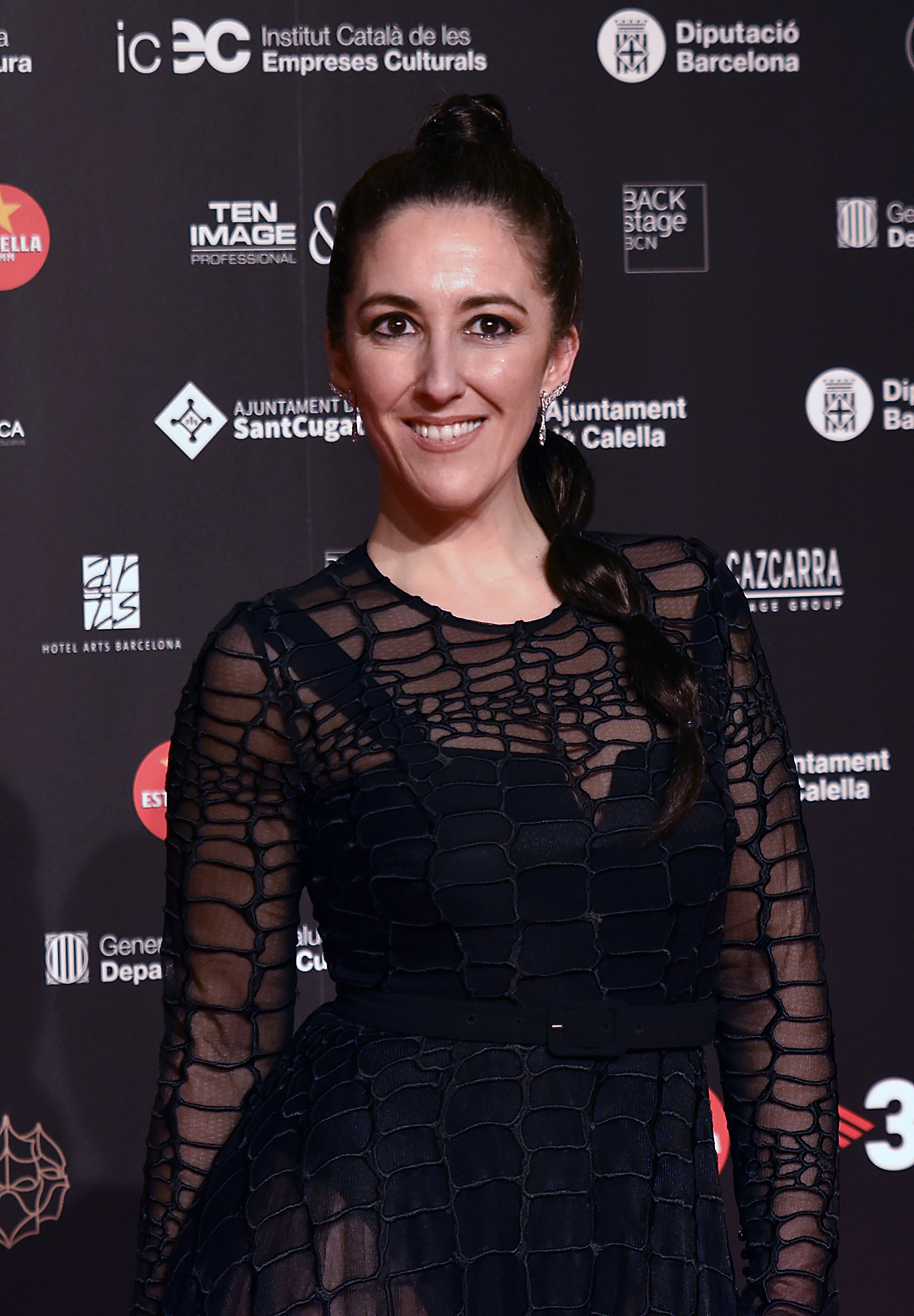
- Betsy Túrnez in 2022
- Born: 13 October 1974 (age 50); Barcelona, Spain
- Occupation: Actress

Betsy Túrnez (born 13 October 1974, Barcelona) is a Spanish actress and film producer, nominated for a Gaudí Award in the category "best leading actress" for her participation in the film El rey tuerto.

== Career ==
=== Beginnings ===
In the early 1990s, she made some minor appearances in films such as Escenes d'una orgia a Formentera by Francesc Bellmunt (1994) and En brazos de la mujer madura by Manolo Lombardero (1996). Between 1999 and 2000, she appeared in some episodes of the soap opera Calle nueva.

In the 2000s, the actress was very active in film and television, besides working as a theater teacher, assistant director, and actor trainer. In 2001, she was part of the cast of three television productions: El cor de la ciutat, Esencia de poder and Periodistas. In 2002 she played the character of Mariola in the series Policías, en el corazón de la calle, and a year later she played a nurse in El pantano. She returned to film in 2004 as part of the cast of Semen, una historia de amor, a film directed by Inés París and Daniela Fejerman. That same year, she appeared in the police TV series El comisario. She closed the 2000s by participating in the film Los ojos de Julia in the role of a receptionist.

=== Recognition ===
Although up to that point, Trnez's appearances in film and television had consisted of minor roles, the 2010s would bring greater national recognition for the actress. After appearing in the series Kubala, Moreno i Manchón, she joined the cast of the series Pop Rapid, where she played the regular role of Gina. After the recognition obtained with this production, she showed her versatility as an actress by playing a variety of characters in the humorous program José Mota presenta.... In 2015, she played the role of Mar in the comedy film Ocho apellidos catalanes. In 2016, she played Lídia, a leading character in Marc Crehuet's film El rey tuerto. Her said performance earned her a Gaud Award nomination in 2017 in the "best female lead" category, losing to Emma Suárez. In 2016, she appeared in the films Contratiempo and 100 metros, before joining the cast of the television series Cuéntame cómo pasó and El fin de la comedia in 2017. Since 2018, she has played the character of Adela in the series Benvinguts a la família.
