= The Next Skin =

- Poster
- Spanish: La próxima piel
- Directed by: Isa Campo; Isaki Lacuesta
- Written by: Isa Campo; Isaki Lacuesta; Fran Araújo
- Produced by: Isa Campo; Isaki Lacuesta; Dan Wechsler
- Starring: Àlex Monner; Emma Suárez; Sergi López; Bruno Todeschini
- Cinematography: Diego Dussuel
- Edited by: Domi Parra
- Music by: Gerard Gil
- Release dates: 28 April 2016 (Málaga); 21 October 2016 (Spain)
- Running time: 103 minutes
- Countries: Spain; Switzerland
- Languages: Catalan; Spanish; French

The Next Skin (Spanish: La próxima piel; Catalan: La propera pell) is a 2016 Spanish-Swiss thriller film co-directed by Isa Campo and Isaki Lacuesta, starring Àlex Monner and Emma Suárez.

Suárez won the Goya Award for Best Supporting Actress at the 31st Goya Awards.

== Cast ==
- Àlex Monner as Gabriel
- Emma Suárez as Ana
- Sergi López as Enric
- Bruno Todeschini as Michel
- Igor Szpakowski as Joan
- Sílvia Bel as Glòria
- Greta Fernández as Clara
- Rick Baster

== Awards ==
Awards	Category	Nominated	Result
Goya Awards	Best Supporting Actress	Emma Suárez	Won
Feroz Awards	Best Actor	Àlex Monner	Nominated

== See also ==
- List of Spanish films of 2016
