= To Steal from a Thief =

- Spanish: Cien años de perdón
- Directed by: Daniel Calparsoro
- Written by: Jorge Guerricaechevarría
- Produced by: Juan Gordon; Emma Lustres; Borja Pena; Ghislain Barrois; Álvaro Augustin
- Starring: Luis Tosar; Rodrigo de la Serna; Raúl Arévalo; José Coronado; Patricia Vico; Marian Álvarez; Joaquín Furriel; Luciano Cáceres
- Cinematography: Josu Incháustegui
- Edited by: Antonio Frutos
- Music by: Julio de la Rosa
- Production companies: Kramer& Sigman Films; Vaca Films; Morena Films; Telecinco Cinema
- Distributed by: 20th Century Fox
- Release dates: 3 March 2016 (Argentina); 4 March 2016 (Spain)
- Countries: Spain; Argentina; France
- Language: Spanish

To Steal from a Thief (Spanish: Cien años de perdón, lit. 'One Hundred Years of Forgiveness') is a Spanish-Argentine thriller film directed by Daniel Calparsoro and written by Jorge Guerricaechevarría. The film had its premiere on 3 March 2016 in Argentina and on 4 March 2016 in Spain.

== Plot ==
A group of thieves led by El Uruguayo is set to rob a bank in Valencia. Their purpose is to steal as many safety boxes as possible and then flee through a dug tunnel that connects with an abandoned subway terminal. However, the press officer of the Prime Minister discovers the thieves are actually after politically compromising information deposited by Gonzalo Soriano, a former member of the government who is in a coma after a severe accident.

The gang's plans start to go awry as the tunnel is flooded by heavy rain, leaving them with little room for escape. The thieves recruited by El Uruguayo were under the impression that this was a simple robbery. But later the heist members learn the truth that he was contracted by the governing party to get a box from safe 314 where Soriano kept the data.

Things aggravate further when Loco messes up twice, by deleting the data from the hard disk retrieved from 314 and under anxiety gives away their cover in an exit. El Gallego and El Uruguayo plan to use the hard disk as leverage, even though it's empty. They negotiate with Mellizo, Security Head from the Spanish secret services. Things don't seem to go well. Suddenly rain clears and the heist members, under the pretense of coming out through the front door using hostages, escape through the tunnel.

The bank manager, who is about to lose her job, is given diamonds by Gallego. Loco provides stolen money to a girl with whom he is instantly smitten to solve her financial troubles. Everyone from the team goes their separate ways with their share. A police personnel involved with the negotiation leaks information to the press about Soriano's hard disk and the governing party's involvement.

== Cast ==
- Luis Tosar as El Gallego, a thief from Galicia.
- Rodrigo de la Serna as El Uruguayo, a thief leader from Uruguay.
- Raúl Arévalo as Ferrán, a political officer.
- José Coronado as Mellizo, an intelligence officer.
- Joaquín Furriel as Loco ("Crazy"), a junior thief.
- Patricia Vico as Sandra, a bank branch director.
- Marian Álvarez as Cristina
- Luciano Cáceres as Varela, a thief.

== Awards and nominations ==
| Awards | Category | Nominated | Result |
|---|---|---|---|
| 31st Goya Awards | Best New Actor | Rodrigo de la Serna | Nominated |
| 31st Goya Awards | Best Original Screenplay | Jorge Guerricaechevarría | Nominated |

== See also ==
- The Bank Job, a 2008 British film with similar plot elements.
