= 100 Meters (2016 film) =

- Original title: 100 metros
- Directed by: Marcel Barrena
- Written by: Marcel Barrena
- Produced by: Tino Navarro; Carlos Fernández; Laura Fernández
- Starring: Dani Rovira; Karra Elejalde; Alexandra Jiménez; Maria de Medeiros; Clara Segura; David Verdaguer; Alba Ribas; Bruno Bergonzini; Andrés Velencoso
- Cinematography: Xavi Giménez
- Edited by: Nacho Ruiz Capillas
- Production companies: Castelao Pictures; MGN Filmes
- Distributed by: Filmax
- Release date: 4 November 2016
- Running time: 108 minutes
- Countries: Spain; Portugal
- Language: Spanish

100 Meters (Spanish: 100 metros) is a 2016 comedy-drama film directed by Marcel Barrena, starring Dani Rovira alongside Karra Elejalde, Alexandra Jiménez, and Maria de Medeiros.

== Plot ==
The plot is based on the true story of a Ramón Arroyo, a Spanish man with multiple sclerosis who tried to finish an Ironman triathlon –3,8 km swimming, 180 km cycling and 42 km running– after he received his diagnosis and was told that he would not be able to walk 100 meters within a year.

== Cast ==
- Dani Rovira as Ramón
- Karra Elejalde as Manolo
- Alexandra Jiménez as Inma
- David Verdaguer as Mario
- Clara Segura as Dra. Berta
- Alba Ribas as Ariadna
- Bruno Bergonzini as Bernat
- Ricardo Pereira as Marcos
- Manuela Couto as jefa de Ramón
- Marc Balaguer as Pau
- Gael Díaz as Borja
- Maria de Medeiros as Noelia
- Andrés Velencoso as Monitor

== Production ==
The film was produced by Castelao Pictures and MGN Filmes. Shooting locations included Sant Just Desvern.

== Release ==
Distributed by Filmax, the film was released theatrically in Spain on 4 November 2016.

== Reception ==
Javier Ocaña of El País pointed out that the film replicates all the tropes of the U.S. cinema of stories about overcoming adversity.

Sergio F. Pinilla of Cinemanía rated the film 3½ out of 5 stars, declaring it a "a compelling, exciting, and true story of a hero" in the verdict.

== Accolades ==
Year	Award	Category	Nominee(s)	Result	Ref.
2017	22nd Forqué Awards	Cinema and Education in Values		Nominated	
2017	31st Goya Awards	Best Supporting Actor	Karra Elejalde	Nominated	

== See also ==
- List of Spanish films of 2016
