= The Death of Louis XIV =

- Film poster
- French: La Mort de Louis XIV
- Directed by: Albert Serra
- Written by: Albert Serra; Thierry Lounas
- Produced by: Thierry Lounas
- Starring: Jean-Pierre Léaud
- Cinematography: Jonathan Ricquebourg
- Edited by: Ariadna Ribas; Artur Tort; Albert Serra
- Music by: Marc Verdaguer
- Production companies: Capricci Films; Rosa Filmes; Bobi Lux; Andergraun Films
- Distributed by: Capricci Films (France)
- Release dates: 19 May 2016 (Cannes); 2 November 2016 (France)
- Running time: 115 minutes
- Countries: France; Portugal; Spain
- Language: French
- Box office: $209,715

The Death of Louis XIV (French: La Mort de Louis XIV) is a 2016 historical drama film directed by Albert Serra and starring Jean-Pierre Léaud. Set in 1715, it depicts the final days of Louis XIV of France. The film had its world premiere at the 2016 Cannes Film Festival on 19 May 2016. It was released in France on 2 November 2016 and received positive reviews from critics.

== Plot ==
After returning from the hunt on 9 August 1715, Louis XIV lies in his bed. Due to his deteriorating cardiovascular health, an embolism in his leg becomes gangrenous. From that point on, he becomes increasingly frail and unable to perform his royal duties. Although he temporarily rallies, he relapses rapidly and acquires a fever due to the infection. Word of the King's worsening medical condition spreads through the Court at Versailles, from which his chief physician forbids further travel. The Royal Family tries to censor the flow of information about the King's deterioration. Four doctors from the University of Paris medical faculty are then summoned to provide diagnosis and care for the ailing monarch, but gangrene is only diagnosed when his chief doctor, Georges Mareschal, makes an incision in his diseased leg and diagnoses it from his subsequent analysis of the wound site. Although Mareschal advises amputation, the King refuses to contemplate it and starts preparation for his imminent death instead. He receives the last sacraments of confession and the rite of final unction, while also organizing a subsequent regency for his young great-grandson, the future King Louis XV with the assistance of his wife Madame Maintenon and Louis Auguste, Duke of Maine, one of his older illegitimate children, who is appointed regent until the five year old Louis XV reaches maturity. François de Neufville, 2nd Duke of Villeroy is appointed Louis XV's legal guardian until his maturity, after which the dying monarch provides his successor with advice about how to rule wisely after his death. Several quacks attempt to 'heal' the King, but he is now succumbing rapidly as his gangrene worsens. On 30 August, he lapses into a coma, before his eventual death on 1 September 1715, at 8.15 am. After a post mortum medical autopsy, his heart and intestines are separated from the rest of his body as his earlier wishes dictated. On 9 September 1715, after lying in state, his body is interred within the Basilica of Saint-Denis

== Cast ==
- Jean-Pierre Léaud as Louis XIV
- Patrick d'Assumçao as Fagon
- Marc Susini as Blouin
- Bernard Belin as Mareschal
- Jacques Henric as Le Tellier
- Irène Silvagni as Madame de Maintenon
- Olivier Cadiot as Doctor

== Production ==
Director Albert Serra and producer Thierry Lounas wrote the screenplay for the film. Jean-Pierre Léaud played the lead role. For the film, Albert Serra did not have any rehearsals. Filming took place in the surroundings of the Château de Hautefort in 2015. It took 15 days to shoot the film in total.

== Release ==
The film had its world premiere at the 2016 Cannes Film Festival on 19 May 2016. It was released in France on 2 November 2016.

== Reception ==
=== Critical response ===
On review aggregator website Rotten Tomatoes, the film holds an approval rating of 88% based on 56 reviews, and an average rating of 6.9/10. The website's critical consensus reads, "The Death of Louis XIV will frustrate viewers out of sync with its deliberate pace, but those with the patience to settle in may be rewarded with a thoughtful, finely detailed drama." On Metacritic, the film has a weighted average score of 76 out of 100, based on 16 critics, indicating "generally favorable reviews".

Boyd van Hoeij of The Hollywood Reporter called the film "[Albert Serra's] most accessible work to date." Glenn Kenny of The New York Times wrote, "As for Mr. Serra, while he often enjoys playing the foppish provocateur in his interviews, his film is sober, meticulous and entirely convincing in its depiction of period and mortality." Ben Kenigsberg of Variety wrote, "As minimalist as Serra's films can be, they are rarely boring, and often given to wry wit."

Peter Bradshaw of The Guardian gave the film 5 out of 5 stars, writing, "At 73, Jean-Pierre Léaud gives what could be the performance of his career as Louis XIV." Allan Hunter of Screen International also commented that "It is easily the actor's best role and most noteworthy performance in some time."

=== Accolades ===
Award	Year of ceremony	Category	Recipient(s)	Result	Ref(s)
Prix Jean Vigo	2016	Best Film	The Death of Louis XIV	Won	
Jerusalem Film Festival	2016	Wilf Family Foundation Award for Best International Film	The Death of Louis XIV	Won	
Louis Delluc Prize	2016	Best Film	The Death of Louis XIV	Nominated	
Gaudí Awards	2017	Best Non-Catalan Language Film	The Death of Louis XIV	Nominated	
Gaudí Awards	2017	Best Director	Albert Serra	Nominated	
Gaudí Awards	2017	Best Cinematography	Jonathan Ricquebourg	Nominated	
Gaudí Awards	2017	Best Editing	Albert Serra, Artur Tort, Ariadna Ribas	Nominated	
Gaudí Awards	2017	Best Art Direction	Sebastian Vogler	Nominated	
Gaudí Awards	2017	Best Costume Design	Nina Avramovic	Won	
Gaudí Awards	2017	Best Makeup and Hairstyles	Marion Vissac, Antoine Mancini	Won	
Lumière Awards	2017	Best Film	The Death of Louis XIV	Nominated	
Lumière Awards	2017	Best Director	Albert Serra	Nominated	
Lumière Awards	2017	Best Actor	Jean-Pierre Léaud	Won	
Lumière Awards	2017	Best Cinematography	Jonathan Ricquebourg	Won	
