= Bernat Vilaplana =

Spanish film editor

- Occupation: Film editor

Bernat Vilaplana is a Spanish film editor. He is best known for his collaborations with J.A. Bayona and Guillermo del Toro, having worked with Bayona on The Impossible, A Monster Calls and Jurassic World: Fallen Kingdom and with del Toro on Pan's Labyrinth, Hellboy II: The Golden Army and Crimson Peak.

== Filmography ==
Films
Year	Title	Position
2023	Society of the Snow	Screenwriter
2018	Jurassic World: Fallen Kingdom	Editor
2016	A Monster Calls	Editor
2015	Crimson Peak	Editor
2012	Lo imposible	Editor
2008	Hellboy II: The Golden Army	Editor
2007	La ZONA	Editor
2007	Lo mejor de mí	Editor
2006	Pan's Labyrinth	Editor
2004	Morir En San Hilario	Editor
2002	Beyond Re-Animator	Editor
2001	Fausto 5.0	2nd Assistant Editor
