= Peter Glossop (sound engineer) =

British sound engineer

- Occupation: Sound engineer
- Years active: 1971-present

Peter Glossop is a British sound engineer. He was nominated for an Academy Award in the category Best Sound for the film Shakespeare in Love. He has worked on over 70 films since 1971.

In 1964, Glossop visited the U.S. as part of a pop band called The Minets of England. The band spent much of the next year performing at Caeser's Monticello in Framingham, Massachusetts. Glossop was the bass player in the band. They had two local hits in Massachusetts, "The Secret of Love" and "My Love is Yours." Members included were Peter Glossop, Ashton DeMello, Harry Kotchie, George Warne, and Bobby Allen.The band broke up in 1965.

== Selected filmography ==
- Shakespeare in Love (1998)
