= María (and Everybody Else) =

- Spanish: María (y los demás)
- Directed by: Nely Reguera
- Written by: Nely Reguera; Eduard Sola; Valentina Viso; Roger Sogues; Diego Ameixeiras
- Produced by: Luisa Romeo
- Starring: Bárbara Lennie; José Ángel Egido; Pablo Derqui; Vito Sanz; María Vázquez; Miguel de Lira; Marina Skell; Julián Villagrán
- Cinematography: Aitor Echeverría
- Edited by: Aina Calleja
- Music by: Nico Casal
- Production companies: Frida Films; Promo Allanda; Avalon PC
- Distributed by: Avalon Distribución
- Release dates: 17 September 2016 (SIFF); 7 December 2016 (Spain)
- Running time: 1h 30min
- Country: Spain
- Language: Spanish

María (and Everybody Else) (Spanish: María (y los demás)) is a 2016 Spanish comedy film directed by Nely Reguera starring Bárbara Lennie.

== Cast ==
- Bárbara Lennie as María
- José Ángel Egido as Antonio
- Pablo Derqui as Jorge
- Vito Sanz as Toni
- María Vázquez
- Miguel de Lira as Sergio
- Marina Skell as Cachita
- Julián Villagrán as Dani
- Rocío Leon
- Aixa Villagrán
- Xúlio Abonjo

== Production ==
The film is a Frida Films, Promo Allanda and Avalon P.C. production.

== Release ==
Distributed by Avalon Distribución, the film was theatrically released in Spain on 7 December 2016.

== See also ==
- List of Spanish films of 2016
