= 1898, Our Last Men in the Philippines =

2016 film

- Film poster
- Spanish: 1898: Los últimos de Filipinas
- Directed by: Salvador Calvo
- Written by: Alejandro Hernández
- Produced by: Enrique Cerezo; Pedro Costa; Miguel Angel Gómez
- Starring: Luis Tosar; Javier Gutiérrez; Álvaro Cervantes; Karra Elejalde; Carlos Hipólito; Ricardo Gómez; Eduard Fernández
- Cinematography: Alex Catalán
- Edited by: Jaime Colis
- Music by: Roque Baños
- Production companies: 13 TV; CIPI Cinematografica S.A. Instituto de la Cinematografía y de las Artes Audiovisuales; Televisión Española
- Distributed by: Sony Pictures Releasing de España
- Release date: 2 December 2016
- Running time: 129 minutes
- Country: Spain
- Language: Spanish
- Box office: €1.8 million

1898, Our Last Men in the Philippines (Spanish: 1898, Los últimos de Filipinas) is a 2016 Spanish war drama film directed by Salvador Calvo. The film depicts the Siege of Baler from 1898 to 1899, where 54 Spanish soldiers defended themselves in the San Luis Obispo de Tolosa church against Philippine revolutionaries. It was shortlisted as one of the three films to be selected as the potential Spanish submission for the Academy Award for Best Foreign Language Film at the 90th Academy Awards. However, it was not selected, with Summer 1993 being selected as the Spanish entry.

== Plot ==
During the Philippine Revolution in October 1897, Tagalog revolutionaries allied with the Katipunan attack a Spanish garrison in Baler, Aurora, killing 37 out of 50 soldiers stationed there. Three months later, the 2nd Expeditionary Battalion led by Captain Enrique de las Morenas y Fossí and Lieutenant Martín Cerezo is sent from Manila to retake the village. Despite being informed by Brother Carmelo of the San Luís Obispo de Tolosa church in Baler that the rebels have left, Cerezo takes no chances and orders his men to proceed with caution. Upon their arrival, they meet Sergeant Jimeno Costa, a survivor of the massacre, and Teresa, a villager who claims to have no qualms with the Spanish Empire. As the battalion consists of new recruits, they are warned by de las Morenas that the humidity, diseases, typhoons, and wildlife are the rebels' closest allies. Among the cadets is Carlos, an artist from Fuenlabrada de los Montes hoping to study at the Real Academia de Bellas Artes de San Fernando after the war. He confides with Brother Carmelo, who shares opium with him to relieve their pain.

Some time later, a wounded messenger delivers news that the United States has declared war on Spain and subsequently destroyed the Spanish fleet in Cavite. As Manila is under siege, supplies to the battalion have been cut off. Morenas orders his men to fortify the church against a possible attack. On 30 June 1898, Tagalog rebels attack the battalion, forcing them to retreat into the church. The next morning, Calixto Villacorta, speaking for Commander Teodoro Novicio Luna of the Filipino forces, offers a one-day truce for each side to bury their own. As both sides gather their dead, Spanish cadet Juan defects to the rebels.

By 10 October, several cadets fall victim to beriberi due to contamination in the food rations from Manila. As Juan attempts to convince the battalion that they are fighting for a lost cause, Morenas succumbs to beriberi that night, leaving Cerezo in charge of the men. Teresa and the village women bring oranges and the latest newspapers to the church as a peace offering, leading to an argument between Cerezo and Costa over the fate of the battalion. On 31 December, Brother Carmelo dies of beriberi. Days later, upon hearing Teresa singing in the village, Cerezo shoots her, prompting the Tagalog forces to shell the church with artillery in retaliation. Cerezo leads Costa and some cadets to sabotage the rebels' cannon, but an erratic Carlos goes further by stealing the village's food and burning the surrounding houses before retreating back to the church. The next day, Carlos is locked in the basement after Brother Carmelo's opium pipe is found and he is experiencing withdrawal symptoms.

On 18 May 1899, after Carlos emerges from his rehabilitation, Lieutenant Colonel Cristóbal Aguilar y Castañeda, on behalf of Governor-General Diego de los Ríos, arrives at the church to deliver newspapers and orders for the battalion to lay down their arms. Cerezo, however, is still not convinced that Spain has lost its colonies to the U.S., believing that the documents he received are false. Carlos offers to travel back to Manila to verify the news they were receiving, but he is captured by Tagalog forces and brought to Luna, who tells him that Spain had sold the Philippines to the Americans for $20 million, leading to the Philippine–American War. He returns to the church to tell Cerezo what he has learned, but Cerezo still refuses to stand down. That night, Carlos, José, and Carvajal attempt to flee the church, but are caught by Costa, who chops off Carlos' right arm while Cerezo has the other two cadets executed. As his men lay wounded from another gun battle, Cerezo realizes the truth when he reads a personnel transfer article on a newspaper indicating that his friend Francisco Díaz was posted to Málaga.

On 2 June, Cerezo has Carlos wave the white flag at the church tower, marking the end of the siege. He then hands over his formal surrender to Luna, who agrees not to take the battalion prisoner and to leave their fate to the American forces. He gives them a guard of honor, and they part with the words "it has been four centuries, lieutenant." Carlos is given a letter of exemplary conduct by Cerezo, but he threatens to tell the Spanish authorities what his superior did to his battalion. Disillusioned by the ordeal he faced, he throws away his art book before he and the surviving members of the battalion leave the church.

The siege lasted for 337 days, with 17 Spanish casualties and more than 700 Filipino deaths. It also marked the end of the Spanish Empire. Of the survivors of the 2nd Expeditionary Battalion, Cerezo received the Laureate Cross and in the historical events the enlisted men received the Cross of Military Merit and a pension for life.

== Cast ==
- Luis Tosar as Lieutenant Martín Cerezo
- Javier Gutiérrez as Sergeant Jimeno Costa
- Álvaro Cervantes as Carlos
- Karra Elejalde as Brother Carmelo
- Carlos Hipólito as Doctor Vigil
- Ricardo Gómez as José
- Patrick Criado as Juan
- Eduard Fernández as Captain Enrique de las Morenas y Fossí
- Miguel Herrán as Carvajal
- Emilio Palacios as Moisés
- Alexandra Masangkay as Teresa
- Pedro Casablanc as Lieutenant Colonel Cristóbal Aguilar y Castañeda
- Raymond Bagatsing as Commander Teodoro Novicio Luna

== Production ==
1898, Our Last Men in the Philippines was shot in the Canary Islands and Equatorial Guinea as stand-ins for the Philippines.

== Reception ==
=== Critical response ===
Jonathan Holland of The Hollywood Reporter called the film "Spectacular and striking, but none too subtle."

=== Accolades ===
Year	Award / Film Festival	Category	Recipient(s)	Result	Ref(s)
2017	2017 Goya Awards	Best New Actor	Ricardo Gómez	Nominated	
2017	2017 Goya Awards	Best New Director	Salvador Calvo	Nominated	
2017	2017 Goya Awards	Best Production Supervision	Carlos Bernases	Nominated	
2017	2017 Goya Awards	Best Cinematography	Alex Catalán	Nominated	
2017	2017 Goya Awards	Best Art Direction	Carlos Bodelón	Nominated	
2017	2017 Goya Awards	Best Costume Design	Paola Torres	Won	
2017	2017 Goya Awards	Best Makeup and Hairstlyes	Milu Cabrer, Alicia López & Pedro Rodríguez "Pedrati"	Nominated	
2017	2017 Goya Awards	Best Sound	Eduardo Esquide, Juan Ferro & Nicolas de Poulpiquet	Nominated	
2017	2017 Goya Awards	Best Special Effects	Pau Costa & Carlos Lozano	Nominated	

== See also ==
- Last Stand in the Philippines – a 1945 Spanish film.
- Baler – a 2008 Philippine film.
