= Sílvia Pérez Cruz =

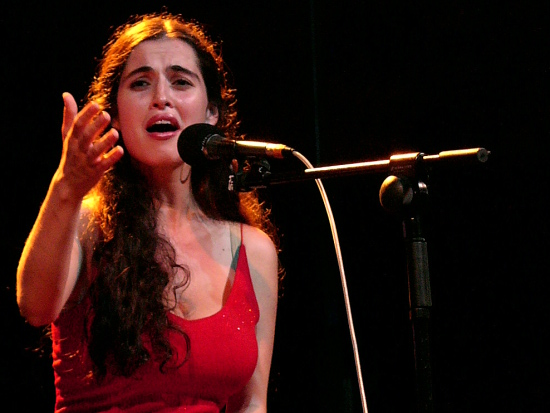
- Sílvia Pérez Cruz in 2008

Background information
- Born: 15 February 1983 (age 43); Palafrugell, Catalonia, Spain
- Genres: Flamenco; jazz; classical; folk; contradanza; fado; tonada
- Occupation: Singer
- Website: www.silviaperezcruz.com

Sílvia Pérez Cruz (born in Palafrugell, 15 February 1983) is a Spanish singer and composer. In 2012, she recorded her first solo album, 11 de Novembre, which was nominated for album of the year in both Spain and France. A song performed by her, "No te puedo encontrar", received a Goya Award for Best Original Song for 2012. In 2014, she released her album Granada. Both releases have been in collaboration with Raül Fernández Miró. She received another Goya Award for best original song, for the song "Ai, ai, ai", composed and performed by her, for the film At Your Doorstep (2016). In 2022, the Spanish Government awarded her the "Premio Nacional de la Músicas Actuales" ("National Prize for contemporary music"). In her latest album, Toda la vida, un día (2023), Cruz "recreated her whole life in a single album, embarking on what would become a year-long work recorded in Barcelona, Pontós, Madrid, Jerez, Buenos Aires, Coatepec and Havana." On July 1, 2024, she performed on NPR's "Tiny Desk Concert."

== Background ==
Cruz's parents were both singers who sang together. Her mother, Glòria Cruz i Torrellas, taught her to play the saxophone and piano as well as how to dance and sculpt. Her father, Càstor Pérez Diz, was a self-taught guitarist. She has a daughter, Lola.

She went to Catalonia College of Music in Barcelona, where she received classical training studying the piano and saxophone and receiving a degree in vocal jazz. While she was at Catalonia College of Music, she and three other women founded a flamenco group called Las Migas. They combined their different musical approaches to create a new type of flamenco. It was not long after this that she became well known in the Spanish music scene.

Cruz told NPR that a song must have a story. She believes that her view of songs as stories comes from her mother who was a singer and storyteller. Her mother, she said, also viewed songs as stories.

== 11 de Novembre ==
In 2012, Cruz released her album 11 de Novembre with Raül Refree. She met Miró in 2006 and they toured together in Mexico, Argentina, and Brazil. Miró was both guitarist and producer for the album. Their songs have been described as a blend of music genres including Fado, jazz improvisation, and flamenco. Cruz won a Goya Award, Spain's most prestigious film award, for best original song "No Te Puedo Encontrar" in the film Blancanieves. The album received a Gold Award disc.

== Granada ==
In 2014, Cruz released her second album Granada, again collaborating with Raül Refree. It reflects Cruz's practice of singing in multiple languages: French, German, English, and four Iberian languages. Included on the album is the song "El Cant Dells Ocells," a Catalan folk song previously made famous by Pablo Casals. Another song is "Gallo Rojo, Gallo Negro", a well-known song from the Spanish Civil War. Cruz first understood the story in the song when she was part of a concert honoring the remaining veterans of the International Brigades who fought against the Nationales in the civil war. Cruz told NPR that she saw tears in the veterans' eyes when they sang the song in their own language. She said, "These people have lived through so much. It's good that I can sing and help them remember." As journalist Betto Arcos concluded, this example illustrates how Cruz comes to understand the stories in the songs she sings.

== Discography ==
	Year	Title	Notes	Release and special editions
As member of other groups	2005	Llama	With Ravid Goldschmidt	
As member of other groups	2006	Unas voces	As member of Las Migas	
As member of other groups	2007	Immigrasons	With Ernesto Snajer y Raül Fernández	Reissued in 2015
As member of other groups	2008	We sing Bill Evans	With Joan Díaz Trío	
As member of other groups	2010	Un sordo s'ho escoltava	As member of Xalupa	
As member of other groups	2010	Reinas del matute	As member of Las Migas	
As member of other groups	2011	En la imaginación	With Javier Colina Trío	Reissued in 2016
As member of other groups	2011	Rompiendo aguas	As member of Llama with Ravid Goldschmidt	
Solo	2012	11 de novembre	Special edition in 2012 and Portuguese release in 2013.	
Solo	2014	Granada	With Raül Fernández Miró	Special edition in 2014
Solo	2016	Domus	Original soundtrack of At Your Doorstep	Special edition in 2016
Solo	2017	Vestida de nit	With string quintet	
Solo	2018	Joia	Double compilation album released only in Japan	
Solo	2020	MA. Live in Tokyo	With Marco Mezquida, recorded live in Blue Note	
Solo	2020	Farsa (género imposible)	Compilations of themes composed for movies, theater and dance.	
Solo	2023	Toda la vida, un día		
Solo	2026	Oral_Abisal		

== Awards and nominations ==
Award	Year	Category	Nominated work	Result	Ref.
Feroz Awards	2017	Best Original Score	At Your Doorstep	Nominated	
Gaudí Awards	2017	Best Actress	At Your Doorstep	Nominated	
Gaudí Awards	2017	Best Original Score	At Your Doorstep	Won	
Goya Awards	2017	Best New Actress	At Your Doorstep	Nominated	
Goya Awards	2017	Best Original Song	"Ai, Ai, Ai" (from At Your Doorstep)	Won	
Latin Grammy Awards	2024	Song of the Year	"313" (with Residente & Penélope Cruz)	Nominated	
Latin Grammy Awards	2024	Best Short Form Music Video	"313" (with Residente & Penélope Cruz)	Won	
Premios de la Academia de Música	2024	Artist of the Year	Herself	Nominated	
Premios de la Academia de Música	2024	Album of the Year	Toda la Vida, un Día	Nominated	
Premios de la Academia de Música	2024	Best Singer-Songwriter Album	Toda la Vida, un Día	Won	
Premios de la Academia de Música	2024	Best Recording Package	Toda la Vida, un Día	Won	
Premios de la Academia de Música	2024	Best Music Video	"Toda la Vida, un Día"	Nominated	
Premios de la Academia de Música	2024	Best Catalan/Valencian/Aranese Song	"Ell no vol que el món s'acabi"	Won	
Premios Max	2018	Best Musical Composition for Stage Performance	Grito Pelao	Won	
