= Guernica (2016 film) =

- Directed by: Koldo Serra
- Screenplay by: Barney Cohen; Carlos Clavijo
- Story by: Barney Cohen; Carlos Clavijo; José Alba; Daniel Dreifuss
- Produced by: José Alba; Daniel Dreifuss
- Starring: James D'Arcy; María Valverde; Jack Davenport
- Cinematography: Unax Mendia
- Edited by: Jose Manuel Jiménez
- Music by: Fernando Velázquez
- Production companies: Pecado Films; Travis Producciones; Sayaka Producciones
- Distributed by: Betta Pictures (Spain); Sony Pictures (worldwide)
- Release dates: 26 April 2016 (Málaga); 9 September 2016 (Spain)
- Running time: 110 minutes
- Countries: Spain; United Kingdom; United States
- Languages: English; German; Basque; Spanish
- Budget: €6 million
- Box office: $396,764

Guernica (Spanish/Basque: Gernika) is a 2016 Spanish-British-American war romance drama film directed by Koldo Serra, starring James D'Arcy, María Valverde and Jack Davenport. It is the first feature film made about the 1937 bombing of Guernica.

The film centres on an American journalist (D'Arcy) covering the Spanish Civil War, and the bombing of Guernica, who falls in love with a censor (Valverde) for the Spanish Republican government. The journalist's character is loosely based on George Steer, a British reporter who covered the war and bombing for the UK media, as well as Ernest Hemingway and Robert Capa.

== Cast ==
- James D'Arcy as Henry Howell
- María Valverde as Teresa
- Jack Davenport as Vasyl, her Soviet supervisor
- Ingrid García Jonsson as Marta, French photographer
- Álex García as Marco, Portuguese journalist
- Bárbara Goenaga as Carmen
- Joachim Paul Assböck as Wolfram Freiherr von Richthofen
- Burn Gorman as Soviet consul
- Markus Oberhauser as German captain

== Production ==
Filming took place in the summer of 2015 in and around Bilbao.

== Release ==
The film premiered at the Málaga Film Festival on 26 April 2016, the 79th anniversary of the bombing of Guernica. On the review aggregator website Rotten Tomatoes, 86% of 7 critics' reviews are positive.

== See also ==
- Guernica (1950 film)
- Guernica (1937 Picasso painting)
