= Ozzy (film) =

- Spanish theatrical release poster
- Directed by: Alberto Rodríguez; Nacho La Casa
- Screenplay by: Juan Ramón Ruiz de Somavía
- Story by: Juan Ramón Ruiz de Somavía
- Produced by: Jeff Bell; Ibón Cormenzana; Phyllis Laing; Nacho La Casa; Ignasi Estapé; Ken Zorniak
- Music by: Fernando Velázquez
- Production companies: Arcadia Motion Pictures; Tangent Animation
- Distributed by: Buena Vista International (Spain); Entertainment One Films (Canada)
- Release date: October 14, 2016 (Spain)
- Running time: 90 minutes
- Countries: Spain; Canada
- Language: English
- Budget: $8.5 million

Ozzy (also known as Ozzy: The Great Furscape) is a 2016 animated comedy film. The film stars Guillermo Romero, José Mota, Fernando Tejero, and Michelle Jenner.

The English dub consists of Jeff Foxworthy, Rob Schneider, Frankie Quinones, and introducing Lexi Walker.

== Plot ==
Ozzy, a Beagle, lives with the Martins and his best friend, Paula. When the family receives an invitation to a Comic Festival in Japan, quarantine rules prevent them from bringing Ozzy along. With no help from relatives, they take Ozzy to Blue Creek, a dog hotel where owners can leave their pets while they travel.

Susan and Ted decide to leave Ozzy in Mr Robbins’s care when he impresses them with the hotel's luxuries. After they leave, Mr Robbins and his assistant, Dominic, secretly transport Ozzy and the other dogs to the real Blue Creek, a dog prison. Ozzy tries to escape, but they catch him and bring him to Grunt, the St. Bernard warden. Grunt ignores Ozzy's protests, removes his collar, and assigns him number 463. Ozzy shares a cell with Fronky, a near-sighted Dachshund; Fronky shares that their owners left the dogs behind. Ozzy still hopes for their return, while Fronky invites him to join his escape plan.

While sorting toy saucers, Ozzy creates a mess on the conveyor belt and is punished by being shoved into a washing machine. He befriends Fronky, and eventually forms connections with elderly fox terrier Chester, who delivers comics and shares feelings of abandonment, and mute sheepdog Doc. Despite Chester's advice to give up, Ozzy remains hopeful his family will return.

The next day, inmates celebrate the release of Vito, a tiny Chihuahua leader. He confronts Ozzy for comments about his appearance, prompting Chief Guard Decker to warn him about solitary confinement. Vito ominously assures Ozzy they will meet again. Later, Ozzy notices Fronky is missing; he returns after a failed escape attempt, revealing he was once a guide dog for a blind man named Bob. Radar tells Ozzy that Vito wants to meet him. After racing Flash, Vito offers Ozzy a chance to be his runner, giving him 24 hours to decide.

Fronky, Chester, and Doc warn Ozzy against entering the races, fearing it would lead to trouble. Despite Vito's threats, Ozzy refused to compete or throw the race. When Grunt offered to take his place and intentionally lose for Vito, Ozzy declined. As Vito and Grunt's harassment intensified, Ozzy's friends faced repercussions for supporting him. Devastated by Decker's words that no one was coming for him, Ozzy realized he needed to make things right. When the Martins returned, Mr. Robbins falsely claimed that Ozzy had died, leaving the family heartbroken.

The group plans to hide in boxes of toy saucers to sneak onto a delivery truck, but first, they need a blueprint from the warden's office. Chester reluctantly helps after Fronky threatens his comics. While Grunt is away, Ozzy, Chester, and Doc sneak in to grab the blueprint. Doc sees photos of himself with his owner, Mike, and Ozzy reassures him they'll reunite. They escape just as Grunt returns. Ozzy then prepares for the race Vito and Grunt have arranged. If Ozzy wins, the prisoners get better food. If he loses, they'll face harsh conditions. On race day, Chester warns of the dangers of escaping, and Ozzy considers focusing on the race instead of the escape plan.

During a racetrack showdown against the guards' champion, Jock, Ozzy vanishes when the lights go out. Vito's henchmen are unable to locate him due to locked exits. Ozzy escapes with his friends, Chester, Fronky, and Doc, through the vents and hides in a delivery truck. Decker catches them, leading to Chester's confession about leaving an oil stain in Grunt's office, which results in Fronky, Chester, and Doc being sent to solitary confinement. When an enraged Grunt confronts Ozzy, he locks Grunt and Decker out and reveals that the race was rigged, restoring the prisoners' memories by tossing their collars aside. The dogs unite, overpower the guards, and capture Mr. Robbins. Ozzy rescues Fronky and Chester, takes down Decker with Fronky's help, and frees Doc. Meanwhile, Vito defeats Grunt and unlocks the gate, allowing everyone to escape.

Upon returning home, Ozzy reunites Fronky and Doc with their families, while Chester is adopted by the Martins, who are also happy to have Ozzy back. Mr. Robbins faces 20 years for animal cruelty, and all the prison dogs are reunited with their families. Ozzy learns to face his fears and stands up to the neighborhood paperboy.

== Voice cast ==
- Guillermo Romero as Ozzy
- Dani Rovira as Fronki
- José Mota as Vito
- Carlos Areces as Nathaniel Robbins
- Michelle Jenner as Paula
- Fernardo Tejero as Radar
- Elsa Pataky as Madden
- Pablo Espinosa as Mike
- Selu Nieto as Dominic

=== English dub ===
- Jeff Foxworthy as Grunt
- Rob Schneider as Vito
- Frankie Quinones as Radar
- Lexi Walker as Paula
- Jeff Espinoza as Jeff
- Stephen Hughes as Ted, Nathaniel Robbins, Twin #1, Carlin, Mike
- Robbie K. Jones as Tex, Dominic, Twin 2
- José Luis Martinez as Remy, Afghan Commentator, Additional Voices
- Jonathan D. Mellor as Chester
- Benjamin Nathan-Serio as Ozzy, Eddie, Fronky
- Amanda J. Nolan as Susan
- Kurt Schiller as Bob
- Jimmy Shaw as Decker
- Colleen Terry as Maddie (Ozzy's girlfriend), Reporter
- Garrett Wall as Flash

Additional voices by Jeff Espinoza, Stephen Hughes, Robbie K. Jones, José Luis Martinez, Kurt Schiller, and Garrett Wall

== Crew ==
=== English dub ===
- Joseph Wilka - Voice Director

== Production ==
The film was co-produced by Spain's Arcadia Motion Pictures, Capitán Araña, and Pachacamac, and Winnipeg's Tangent Animation. Pre-production was done in Spain, and animation was produced in Canada using Blender software.

Executive producer, Jeff Bell described the movie as a "Pixar-like quality that falls into the prison movie genre with funny tributes to the great prison classics. It's a story about friendship, loyalty, courage and the ability to find the best in ourselves when facing a tough situation".

The film had a budget of 8.5 million dollars.

== Release ==
Disney released the film in Spain on 14 October 2016. The film was released by Signature in the U.K. on 21 October 2016, and Entertainment One in Canada.
