= The One-Eyed King =

2016 film

- Film poster
- Directed by: Marc Crehuet
- Starring: Alain Hernández; Miki Esparbé
- Release date: 24 April 2016 (MFF)
- Running time: 87 minutes
- Country: Spain
- Languages: Spanish; Catalan

The One-Eyed King (Catalan: El rei borni) is a 2016 Spanish comedy film based on play by Marc Crehuet.
