= Crimson Peak (soundtrack) =

Crimson Peak (Original Motion Picture Soundtrack)

Film score by Fernando Velázquez
- Released: October 16, 2015 (digital); October 23, 2015 (physical)
- Recorded: 2014–2015
- Studio: Abbey Road Studios, London
- Genre: Film score
- Length: 74:46
- Label: Quartet Records
- Producer: Fernando Velázquez

Fernando Velázquez chronology
Colonia (2015)	Crimson Peak (2015)	Pride and Prejudice and Zombies (2015)

Crimson Peak (Original Motion Picture Soundtrack) is the soundtrack to the 2015 film of the same name directed by Guillermo del Toro and starred Mia Wasikowska, Jessica Chastain and Tom Hiddleston. The soundtrack features 36 tracks from the original score composed by Fernando Velázquez and was released by Quartet Records digitally on October 16, 2015 and in physical formats on October 23. The soundtrack was further published in vinyl by Waxwork Records and released on June 2, 2023.

== Development ==
In October 2013, Fernando Velázquez was announced as the music composer. He earlier associated with del Toro in The Orphanage (2007) and Mama (2013) where the latter served as the producer, but it would be the first time scoring for del Toro as the director. During pre-production, he wrote an "incredibly creepy lullaby" and a "beautiful waltz" that sets the tone for the film which would be mostly melancholic. del Toro used temp music to edit the sequences. The score was recorded at the Abbey Road Studios in London.

== Track listing ==
No.	Title	Length
1.	"Edith's Theme"	1:56
2.	"My Mother's Funeral"	0:50
3.	"Buffalo"	2:08
4.	"After the Ghost"	0:36
5.	"Soft Hands"	0:46
6.	"McMichael"	1:05
7.	"Valse sur une berceuse anglaise"	1:18
8.	"Ghost I"	1:41
9.	"I Desperately Need Your Help"	0:54
10.	"The Butterfly"	0:52
11.	"Optician"	1:26
12.	"Return to Your Ghost"	3:55
13.	"Allerdale Hall"	6:19
14.	"The House"	1:48
15.	"What Was That"	0:41
16.	"Lullaby Variation"	1:41
17.	"The Book"	0:53
18.	"The Attic"	1:47
19.	"Ghost II"	0:51
20.	"Crimson Peak"	0:54
21.	"Ghost III"	1:42
22.	"I Have to Get Away from Here"	1:22
23.	"Letter from Italy"	0:38
24.	"I'm Here"	3:02
25.	"The Machine / The Box"	1:28
26.	"Bubbling Up"	0:22
27.	"Key's Chase"	0:57
28.	"You Didn't Drink Your Tea"	0:58
29.	"The Gramophone"	3:04
30.	"You Are Awake"	1:40
31.	"Let Me Help You"	0:53
32.	"We Stay Together"	1:15
33.	"I Know Who You Are"	8:15
34.	"Lucille & Showdown"	10:46
35.	"Finale"	1:52
36.	"Credits"	4:11
Total length:		74:46

== Reception ==
Music critic Jonathan Broxton of Movie Music UK wrote, "Fernando Velázquez has crafted a beautiful celebration of Gothic romance, which expertly balances the love story with the more horrific moments, complements director del Toro’s stylish visuals, and features a truly exquisite central theme." Tim Grierson of Screen International said that the composer, in collaboration with the other principal crew "have produced such an absorbing, enveloping world that the very fabric of the sound and images generates sufficient dread". Peter Debruge of Variety and Mark Kermode of The Guardian described it as "wonderfully eerie" and "yearning". Pete Simons of Synchrotones described it as a "perfect example of a ‘gothic’ score".

== Accolades ==
Award	Category	Recipient(s)	Result	Ref.
Fangoria Chainsaw Awards	Best Score	Fernando Velázquez	Runner-up	
Saturn Awards	Best Music	Fernando Velázquez	Nominated	
