= Francisco Bosch =

Spanish actor and dancer

- Born: October 5, 1982 (age 42); Valencia, Spain
- Other names: Fran
- Occupation(s): Actor, Ballet dancer

Francisco Bosch (born 5 October 1982) is a Spanish actor and dancer. He was known for playing as Bagoas in the 2004 Oliver Stone film Alexander.

His interest in dance began when his grandmother took him to a meeting of her flamenco group when he was five years old. He began his dance training at Conservatorio Professional de Danza in Valencia and continued study at the Conservatorio de Danza in Madrid before joining Nacho Duato's Compania Nacional de Danza. In 2002, he joined the English National Ballet.

He played Bagoas opposite Colin Farrell in the 2004 Oliver Stone film Alexander.

Francisco has also completed filming in the 2006 films Nina's Heavenly Delights and Russell Mulcahy's The Curse of King Tut's Tomb TV series. Francisco appeared in The Magic Flute 2006 adaptation of Mozart's opera by Kenneth Branagh. He was next in Layke Anderson's House of Boys, written by Jean-Claude Schlinger.

In a 2013 interview with Out in the City magazine, Bosch confirmed that he is gay.
