= The Legacy of the Bones =

2019 Spanish supernatural crime-thriller film by Fernando González Molina

- Film poster
- Spanish: Legado en los huesos
- Directed by: Fernando González Molina
- Screenplay by: Luiso Berdejo
- Based on: Legado en los huesos by Dolores Redondo
- Produced by: Adrián Guerra; Mercedes Gamero; Mikel Lejarza; Peter Nadermann
- Starring: Marta Etura; Carlos Librado "Nene"; Leonardo Sbaraglia; Francesc Orella; Imanol Arias; Benn Northover; Itziar Aizpuru; Elvira Mínguez; Colin McFarlane; Susi Sánchez
- Music by: Fernando Velázquez
- Production companies: Nostromo Pictures; Mantecadas Salazar AIE; Atresmedia Cine; Nadcon Film; ZDF; ARTE
- Distributed by: DeAPlaneta
- Release dates: 10 October 2019 (Sitges); 5 December 2019 (Spain)
- Running time: 119 minutes
- Countries: Spain; Germany
- Languages: Spanish; Basque; English

The Legacy of the Bones (Spanish: Legado en los huesos) is a 2019 Spanish supernatural crime-thriller film directed by Fernando González Molina. The film is the second in the Baztán Trilogy and is an adaptation based on the eponymous novel by Dolores Redondo. It is a sequel to the 2017 thriller film The Invisible Guardian and is followed by Offering to the Storm.

== Plot ==
Amaia Salazar returns to the Baztán Valley to investigate suicides that have a mysterious and jarring pattern. She believes that the suicide cases are linked to a murder case that she solved in Northern Spain a year before. Salazar, who is pregnant and about to give birth to a baby boy, returns as the detective from The Invisible Guardian and leads the investigation. She also has to confront the challenges of her mentally ill and disturbed mother Rosario.

At the City Court, Amaia Salazar and her team await the trial of Jason Medina who has been accused of the rape, mutilation and murder of his stepdaughter, Johana Márquez. Just before the trial starts, Medina is found dead in the court's bathroom having committed suicide by slashing his wrists, and leaving a little note in a pocket of his pants with just one word written: "Tartalo".

This event causes Amaia's water to break and she gives birth to a boy, Ibai, in the hospital. Amaia and her American husband James celebrate the birth of their first child. Reinstated to the active service four months later, Amaia is called by her superior to lead investigation into two different cases. First, Monseñor Landero and Padre Sarasola requested Amaia specifically to investigate with secrecy the profanation of a little church where a baby's amputated arm was found in the altar and second, a man incarcerated in Logroño for the murder of his wife, calls for Amaia with the message that he will reveal only to her the location of his wife's corpse. The man commits suicide after giving a note to a prison guard, where only "Tartalo" is written. Amaia links the "Tartalo" message to the pile of bones that her team had found the year before. She finds that "Tartalo" refers to an old pagan legend told by the Spanish Inquisition where a giant eats Christian babies to stop them from growing up religious.

In the meantime, Amaia and her family move to Elizondo after her Aunt Engrasi mentions the abandoned house that her grandmother left behind. Amaia meets the groundskeeper, but finds it odd when he does not greet her back after waving at him. Engrasi mentions that he does not speak much and is estranged from his son.

Amaia video calls her former mentor and FBI agent Aloisius Dupree, asking for help; at the same time Aunt Engrasi uses tarot cards to predict what could happen, warning Amaia to be careful because there's evil around her. Judge Javier Markina follows the investigation with great attention. Amaia's constant calls to work cause a rift in her relationship with James, despite him moving to Elizondo in hopes of growing the family. However, the case makes a dramatic twist by double-entry: the baby with an amputated arm shares Amaia's DNA and is revealed to be Amaia's twin sister she never knew existed.

Amaia dreams of her child self and her twin sister in the woods and we see a flashback to when Rosario attempts to kill her twin babies, it is only when Amaia's father intervenes that Amaia is saved, but it is too late for the other twin.

Amaia finds the courage to visit her mother to confront her about this attack but is instead called in after it is reported that Rosario attacked a nurse with a scalpel. A blood-written message of "Tartalo" is found under the bed, causing the reappearance of the enigmatic psychiatrist Padre Saralosa who, interested in Rosario, tries to convince Amaia to move Rosario to Saralosa's university hospital in which he is the director.

Forced to look into her family's past, Amaia discovers the relation between her mother and a sect dedicated to a pagan cult that included human sacrifices, and that all the crimes are connected to her.

Amaia asks for the psychiatric interviews, which were all filmed, between the doctor and her mother. She discovers that the doctor is in fact the groundskeeper's estranged son, who is involved in the pagan acts. She also then realizes that her mother intends to kill her son, Ibai. She immediately calls Rosaura to save Ibai but Elizondo is flooded and Rosaura arrives too late to save him, finding an unconscious Engrasi and Ibai gone. Jonan and Amaia drive on and find Rosario and Doctor Berasategui ready to sacrifice the baby. Amaia shoots to stop the sacrifice. Rosario then realises that Amaia’s child is a boy and not a girl as intended. She tells Amaia that although she was successful in sacrificing her sister, she is not done with Amaia. She then disappears.

Amaia puts her twin sister's bones to rest in the backyard of the large house, but her mother is still at large.

== Cast ==
- Marta Etura as Amaia Salazar
- Elvira Mínguez as Flora Salazar, Amaia's oldest sister
- Francesc Orella as Fermín Montés
- Miren Gaztanaga as Rosario, Amaia's mother
- Marta Larralde as Yolanda Berrueta
- Leonardo Sbaraglia as Juez Markin
- Álvaro Cervantes as Doctor
- Itziar Aizpuru as Tía Engrasi
- Carlos Librado "Nene" as Jonan Etxaide
- Miquel Fernández as Padre de Amaia
- Pedro Casablanc as Comisario General
- Colin McFarlane as Aloisius Dupree
- Benn Northover as James
- Paco Tous as Dr. San Martín
- Manolo Solo as Doctor Basterra
- Ramón Barea as Alfonso Álvarez de Toledo
- Patricia López Arnaiz as Rosaura Salazar

== Production ==
The film is a Nostromo Pictures and Mantecadas Salazar AIE production, produced in association with Atresmedia Cine, Nadcon Film, ZDF and ARTE. It had the participation of Atresmedia and Cosmopolitan TV.

== Release ==
The Legacy of the Bones premiered at the 52nd Sitges Film Festival on 10 October 2019. Distributed by DeAPlaneta, it was theatrically released in Spain on 5 December 2019. The film streaming was made available via Netflix on 17 April 2020. Netflix unveiled the official trailer of the film on 12 April 2020 and the film release was opened to mixed reviews from critics.

== Sequel ==
The sequel to this film titled Offering to the Storm was planned to be released on 27 March 2020, but the release was put on hold due to the COVID-19 pandemic in Spain. It is the last film in the Baztán Trilogy and was released on 24 July 2020 on Netflix.

== See also ==
- List of Spanish films of 2019
