= Elvira Mínguez =

Spanish actress

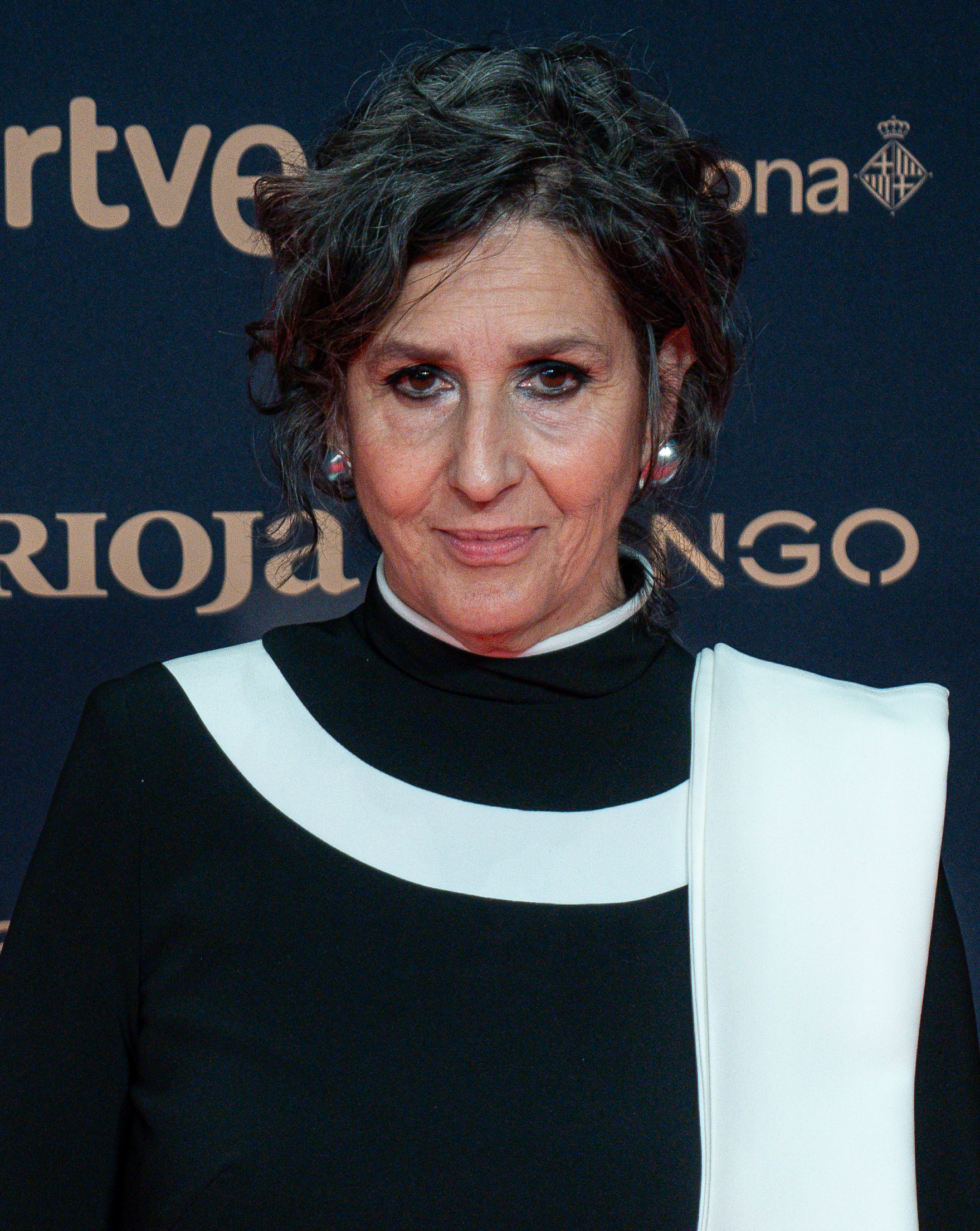
- Mínguez in 2026
- Born: 23 July 1965 (age 61); Valladolid, Spain

Elvira Mínguez (born 23 July 1965) is a Spanish actress. Mínguez has appeared in such films as Running Out of Time (1994), The Lucky Star (1997), Tapas (2005) and El desconocido (2015). Her television credits include Abuela de verano, Mar de dudas, Imperium and El tiempo entre costuras.

== Life and career ==
Mínguez was born in Valladolid on 23 July 1965. She has stated that she was the victim of sexual abuse from her father since she was very young. After developing an early acting career on stage, she made her big screen debut in Running Out of Time (1994), landing a nomination for the Goya Award for Best New Actress for her performance in the film portraying an ETA member.

In 2023, she published her debut novel La sombra de la tierra, a "rural Western" set in 1896 in Villaveza del Agua. She developed, in direction and writing duties, a television series (also titled La sombra de la tierra) for Atresplayer based on her own novel.

For her supporting role as an anarcho-syndicalist chef in the ensemble period comedy The Dinner (2025), she earned another Goya Award nomination.

== Filmography ==
=== Films ===
- Días contados (1994) - Lourdes
- Historias del Kronen (1995) - Camarera
- Cachito (1996) - Nati
- Calor... y celos (1996) - Gaby
- The Lucky Star (1997) - Ana Mari
- Em dic Sara (1998) - Sara
- Lágrimas negras (1998) - Marta
- Diario para un cuento (1998) - Dolly
- El invierno de las anjanas (2000) - María
- El portero (2000) - Úrsula
- Sólo mía (2001) - Andrea
- The Dancer Upstairs (2002) - Llosa
- Canícula (2002) - Isabel
- Trece campanadas (2002) - Carmen
- The Reckoning (2002) - Martha
- Grimm (2003) - Teresa
- Los abajo firmantes (2003) - Carmen
- Tapas (2005) - Raquel
- El buen destino (2005) - Esmeralda
- La caja (2006) - Isabel
- Pudor (2007) - Julia
- Cobardes (2008) - Merche
- Che (2008) - Celia Sánchez
- El desconocido (2015) - Belén
- Truman (2015) - Gloria
- The Chosen (2016) - Caridad Mercader
- Pasaje al amanecer (2016) - Carmen
- Don't Blame the Karma for Being an Idiot (2016) - Úrsula
- The Invisible Guardian (2017) - Flora Salazar
- Everybody Knows (2018) - Mariana
- The Legacy of the Bones (2019) - Flora Salazar
- Mi Vida (2019) - Andrea Cruz
- Ofrenda a la tormenta (2020) - Flora Salazar

=== TV ===
- Mar de dudas (1995) - Charo
- Abuela de verano (2005) - Carmen
- Clara Campoamor. La mujer olvidada (2011) - Clara Campoamor (TV movie)
- Imperium (2012) - Antonia
- El tiempo entre costuras (2013) - Dolores
- Hermanos (2014) - Julia Rodríguez.
- Los nuestros (2019) - Teniente Coronel Iborra
- Instinto (2019) – Doctora Villegas.
- Desaparecidos (2020–) – Carmen Fuentes.
- Ena. Queen Victoria Eugenia (2025) – Maria Christina of Austria
