= The Impossible (soundtrack) =

The Impossible (Original Motion Picture Soundtrack)

Film score by Fernando Velázquez
- Released: 13 November 2012
- Studio: Abbey Road Studios, London
- Genre: Film score
- Length: 52:29
- Label: Quartet Records
- Producer: Stephen McLaughlin

Fernando Velázquez chronology
Sons of the Clouds: The Last Colony (2012)	The Impossible (2012)	All That Matters Is Past (2012)

The Impossible (Original Motion Picture Soundtrack) is the film score composed by Fernando Velázquez to the 2012 film The Impossible directed by J. A. Bayona and starring Ewan McGregor, Naomi Watts and Tom Holland. The score was recorded at the Abbey Road Studios in London. It was released through Quartet Records on 13 November 2012 followed by a limited edition vinyl LP pressed in 600 copies was released on 11 December 2012.

== Development ==
The original score for The Impossible is composed by Fernando Velázquez whom he had worked with Bayona in The Orphanage (2007). Velázquez received inputs from María Belón, the survivor of the 2004 Indian Ocean earthquake and tsunami, on whom the film is based, as she visited the Abbey Road Studios when he was recording the important cues with the musicians. He considered it "beautiful how she summarized simply with some words what the music means in the film" something which cannot be told in awards and understood the importance of music.

Velázquez and Bayona were conscious on balancing the film's emotional musical cues, by calculating the amount of music, its placement, style and the number of players in each cue. He added that going a little too much will spoil the story, and little too less might not be enough to express the emotional quotient which was a challenges. Velázquez felt he and his team were happy because people went through tragedies like this can say that they can recognize themselves in the score which he considered to be rewarding enough.

== Reception ==
Jonathan Broxton of Movie Music UK described it as "one of the finest scores of 2012" which makes listeners "impressed, entertained, and deeply moved" and recommended it for those who like "orchestral, theme-driven scores with powerful emotional cores". James Southall of Movie Wave called it an "an extremely beautiful, very affecting score featuring a main theme that is truly outstanding"; he added that despite the repetition, "the theme never loses its power, its ability to be quite profoundly moving".

Deborah Young of The Hollywood Reporter wrote "Fernando Velazquez’s score is not afraid to step in operatically to push the emotions even farther but at times feels unnecessarily manipulative when everything onscreen is already at a fever pitch." Justin Chang of Variety stated that Velázquez's score has "increasingly operatic surges". Jeff Meyers of Metro Times wrote "Fernando Velázquez's histrionic score [puts] an unfortunate exclamation point on every heart-breaking scene." Reema Moudgil of The New Indian Express wrote "Fernando Velázquez’s music gathers symphonic terror and gentle compassion, thundering and ebbing along with the story". James Croot of Stuff wrote "Fernando Velazquez delivers a truly haunting score".

== Track listing ==
No.	Title	Length
1.	"The Impossible Main Title"	5:11
2.	"The Best Holiday Season Ever"	2:27
3.	"Is It Over?"	0:53
4.	"Even If It's the Last Thing We Do"	1:28
5.	"Kem Kang Noi"	2:02
6.	"My Boys, I Cannot See Them"	3:53
7.	"Go and Help People"	1:37
8.	"I Will Bring Your Pappa Here"	1:23
9.	"Is There Somebody We Could Call?"	1:21
10.	"We'll Drive You Somewhere Safer"	1:17
11.	"I Won't Stop Looking Until I Find Them"	1:31
12.	"But She'll Be OK, Right?"	1:52
13.	"Mom, Guess What I Just Saw Outside?"	5:50
14.	"Let's Go, No Need to Wait"	4:45
15.	"Am I Dead?"	2:36
16.	"I Have a Family Too"	1:31
17.	"He Looked so Happy"	5:02
18.	"The Impossible End Titles"	7:50
Total length:		52:29

== Accolades ==
Award	Category	Nominee	Result	Ref.
Goya Awards	Best Original Score	Fernando Velázquez	Nominated	
International Film Music Critics Association	Film Score of the Year	Fernando Velázquez	Nominated	
International Film Music Critics Association	Film Music Composition of the Year	Fernando Velázquez – ("The Impossible Main Title")	Won	
International Film Music Critics Association	Best Original Score for a Drama Film	Fernando Velázquez	Nominated	
