= Zip & Zap and the Marble Gang =

2013 film by Óskar Santos

- Film poster
- Directed by: Oskar Santos
- Screenplay by: Jorge Lara; Francisco Roncal
- Story by: Oskar Santos; Jorge Lara
- Based on: Comics Zipi y Zape by José Escobar Saliente
- Produced by: Mercedes Gamero; Mikel Lejarza; Francisco Ramos; Koldo Zuazua
- Starring: Raúl Rivas; Daniel Cerezo; Javier Gutiérrez
- Cinematography: Josu Inchaustegui
- Edited by: Carolina Martínez Urbina
- Music by: Fernando Velázquez
- Production companies: Zeta Audiovisual; Mod Producciones; Antena 3 Films; Kowalski Films
- Distributed by: Buena Vista International
- Release dates: 8 September 2013 (TIFF); 4 October 2013 (Spain)
- Running time: 97 minutes
- Country: Spain
- Language: Spanish
- Budget: €6 million

Zip & Zap and the Marble Gang (Spanish: Zipi y Zape y el club de la canica) is a 2013 Spanish adventure film directed by Oskar Santos. It is based on the comic book series Zipi y Zape, created by José Escobar Saliente.

The film had its premiere at the 2013 Toronto International Film Festival on 8 September 2013. It was well received at Festival de San Sebastián on 21 September 2013. The film had a theatrical release in Spain on 4 October 2013. The film later screened at 2014 Sundance Film Festival, in the newly introduced category Sundance Kids on 18 January 2014.

A sequel, Zip & Zap and the Captain's Island, was released in 2016.

== Plot ==
Twin brothers Zip and Zap are sent to the summer school Hope, a re-education centre ran by strict Falconetti, who forbids all forms of recreation and entertainment. When Zap gets in trouble for disrupting a class, he is locked in the "Isolation Room" where he is told to think about what he has done. While there, he finds a bag of marbles hidden in the room, and forms the "Marble gang" with several other students in the school: Filo, Micro, and Matilda, who is Falconetti's niece; the gang performs a variety of pranks, including the vandalising of the statue of Sebastian Hope, the school's founder. They always leave a single marble at the site of their prank.

When Falconetti attempts to stop the vandalism, he accidentally breaks the part of the statue, revealing a map that shows a path to hidden diamonds under the school. Zip and Zap steal the map from his office and follow the map's clues while they are pursued by Falconetti. The Marble Gang end up in a room full of toys, and Zap considers that the "diamonds" in the map were really just a reference to Sebastian Hope's diamonds – his toys. Falconetti finds them, then reveals that the school was originally a school of play and toys ran by Hope, until Falconetti bought over the school and transformed it to please his father. Falconetti locks them in the room of toys, but Micro notices a machine where they insert several toys they picked up while exploring the school (to insert into the word TOYS: wooden mallet - T, steeringwheel - O, Slingshot - Y, duvk toy - S). Music starts playing around the school and the students and teachers discover it is coming from the statue of Hope. The underground room Zip and Zap were locked in starts spiralling up into the main garden in front of the school, where all the students and teachers are gathered. The other students start cheering on the Marble Gang, and another teacher punches Falconetti and tells the other teachers to lock Falconetti until the police arrives. The movie ends with Zap recollecting how "we never found the diamonds, but it was the best summer we ever had," and the five members of the Marble Gang all holding their last marble together, than tossing it into the air. The diamonds are revealed to have been hidden in the marble.

== Cast ==
- Raúl Rivas as Zipi (called Zip in the English version of this movie)
- Daniel Cerezo as Zape (called Zap in the English version of this movie)
- Javier Gutiérrez as Falconetti
- Claudia Vega as Matilde
- Fran García as Filo
- Marcos Ruiz as Micro
- Christian Mulas as Heidi
- Aníbal Tártalo as Piojo
- Alberto López as PeloCohete
- Javier Cifrián as GriGrillo
- Álex Angulo as Sebastián Esperanza
- Juan González as Flipao
- Joseba Apaolaza as Padre Falconetti
- Iñake Irastorza as Bibliotecaria

== Reception ==
Zip & Zap and the Marble Gang received positive reviews from critics. Jonathan Holland in his review for The Hollywood Reporter said that "A slice of wholesome, family-friendly entertainment whose main interest lies in its lavish often spectacular visuals." Jaime Winston of Salt Lake magazine, praised the film by saying that "The dialogue's witty, the special effects are seamless and the story is pretty smart." Matthew Blevins in his review for Next Projection said that "Zip & Zap and the Marble Gang will entrance kids and speak to their intrinsic rebelliousness with its charms and message to never underestimate the value of fun, even if reactionary parents and cruel taskmasters have forgotten the best parts of youth."

== Accolades ==
Year	Award	Category	Recipient	Result	Ref.
2014	Goya Awards	Best Adapted Screenplay	Jorge A. Lara and Francisco Roncal	Nominated	
2014	Goya Awards	Best Art Direction	Juan Pedro de Gaspar	Nominated	
2014	Goya Awards	Best Production Supervision	Koldo Zuazua	Nominated	
2014	Goya Awards	Best Production Supervision	Best Special Effects	Nominated	
2014	Neox Fan Awards	Best Spanish film		Finalist	
2014	Neox Fan Awards	Best Spanish film actor	Javier Gutiérrez	9th	
2014	Neox Fan Awards	Best Spanish film actor	Daniel Cerezo	10th	
