= Adrián Guerra =

Spanish film producer

Adrián Guerra Armas (born 1984) is a Spanish film producer. Born in Las Palmas, he is known mostly for his collaborations with Rodrigo Cortés. He is currently at his production company "Nostromo". He is also spearheading a project to develop Spain's largest virtual film studio, to be called "Orca Studios".

== Filmography ==
- Maquillando: Los cronocrímenes, (2008, short)
- Cómo se hizo: Los cronocrímenes, (2008, short)
- Buried, (2010)
- Guest, (2010)
- Apartment 143, (2012)
- Red Lights, (2012)
- Grand Piano, (2013)
- The Gunman, (2015)
- Cómo Sobrevivir a una Despedida, (2015)
- Palm Trees in the Snow, (2015)
- Penny Dreadful, (2016, TV, 6 episodes)
- The Invisible Guest, (2016)
- Inside, (2016)
- The Invisible Guardian, (2017)
- The Titan, (2018, executive)
- Down a Dark Hall, (2018)
- Life Itself, (2018, executive)
- Paradise Hills, (2019)
- The Kill Team, (2019)
- Wasp Network, (2019, executive)
- The Legacy of the Bones, (2019)
- The Occupant, (2020)
- Offering to the Storm, (2020)
- The Minions of Midas, (2020, TV, executive)
- The Map That Leads to You, (2025)
- Rule of Three, (TBA)
- The Last Druid, (TBA)
