= The Invisible Guardian =

2017 film by Fernando González Molina

- Original title: El guardián invisible
- Directed by: Fernando González Molina
- Screenplay by: Luiso Berdejo
- Based on: El guardián invisible by Dolores Redondo
- Produced by: Mercedes Gamero; Mikel Lejarza; Peter Naderman; Núria Valls; Adrián Guerra
- Starring: Marta Etura; Elvira Mínguez; Carlos Librado "Nene"; Francesc Orella; Itziar Aizpuru; Benn Northover
- Cinematography: Flavio Labiano
- Edited by: Verónica Callón
- Music by: Fernando Velázquez
- Production companies: Nostromo Pictures; Atresmedia Cine
- Distributed by: DeAPlaneta
- Release date: 3 March 2017
- Running time: 129 minutes
- Country: Spain
- Languages: Spanish; Basque; English

The Invisible Guardian (Spanish: El guardián invisible) is a 2017 Spanish thriller film directed by Fernando González Molina based on the eponymous novel by Dolores Redondo. It was followed by two sequels, The Legacy of the Bones and Offering to the Storm.

== Plot ==
Policía Foral inspector Amaia Salazar, a former FBI agent, lives in Pamplona with her American husband, James, an artist. She returns to her hometown of Baztan, in Navarre, which she hoped never to set foot in again, to investigate the murder of a girl, 13-year-old Ainhoa Elizasu. Ainhoa was found naked and posed in the woods, her face scrubbed clean of makeup and her hair neatly arranged, and a cake placed on her shaved pubis, with her heels taken off. Amaia links this with the death six weeks earlier of Carla Huarte, who was strangled with the same type of rope, and fears a serial killer may be at work. Both bodies were covered with hair from multiple animals, an oddity as none of the bodies show marks from any animals.

Amaia and James move in with her Aunt Engrasi, who raised her for most of her life. She is greeted warmly by her sister Rosaura, who is staying with Engrasi because of a fight with her husband, Freddy. Amaia's relationship is strained with her sister Flora, who, with Rosaura, now runs the family business, a commercial bakery. Flora is divorced from her ex-husband, Victor, and is resentful of Amaia, who is trying to start a family. Flora accuses Amaia of abandoning their mentally ill and abusive mother, Rosario, now in a nursing home, even though she has a pathological hatred for Amaia. James is shocked to learn that Rosario is not dead, as Amaia claimed.

Amaia instructs police officer Jonan Etxaide to look back 20 years for similar crime patterns and other events occurring in Baztan. He connects several murders she believes could have been committed by the same killer. She believes she is looking for a male who was likely sexually repressed in his youth and who would be familiar to the girls, making it likely they would go willingly with him.

The serial killer is dubbed El Basajaún ("Lord of the Woods") by the media after a Basque mythological creature. Engrasi insists that the basajaún is real and a protector of the forest, and that one saved Engrasi's life when she was a little girl by stopping her from falling into a cavern.

Another girl, Anne Arbizu, goes missing. Amaia is convinced she sees Anne outside her window late one night, but the next day her body is discovered in the forest, her body arranged in the same ritualized manner, dead for 24 hours. Amaia discovers Anne was having an affair with a married man — Amaia's brother-in-law, Freddy. Freddy attempts suicide because of his anguish, but after exonerating him, Amaia does not reveal the affair to the police.

The cake placed on the bodies is local txantxigorri cake. Flora states that it is of the highest quality, meaning it could come from only a handful of bakeries. When Amaia requests a sample of the flour for analysis, Flora gives her different flour than the bakery uses. Flora is arrested for obstruction but insists she was merely taking precautions as workers frequently take home flour. The lab also matches the flour from the cakes to the flour in Rosaura's home, which she takes from the bakery, but Amaia does not reveal this either.

Another girl disappears, but Amaia is removed from the case after her captain discovers her secrecy. Detective Montés replaces her, even though Amaia suspects him of having a personal relationship with Flora. Aloisius Dupree, an FBI friend, encourages her to remove herself from the case and look at it in its entirety. Amaia thinks back to her early life, when Rosario, in a psychotic rage, attempted to murder her at the bakery, at which point Amaia was taken to live with Engrasi.

Amaia goes to visit Rosario, who calls Amaia a bitch and attempts to bite her. She learns that Rosario, now restrained, had attacked a nurse and bitten her while calling her Amaia and that her brother-in-law visits Rosario weekly.

Amaia and Jonan drive to Victor's house but Jonan arrives first and finds it empty while Amaia flips her car into a ravine during a thunderstorm on her way to the house. She wakes up on the ground away from her car and sees a large hairy creature in the distance and follows him. The pursuit leads her to an abandoned house, where she is attacked by Victor. When she confronts him about the murders, he admits it was his doing so that he could cleanse the valley of the filth. Amaia stabs him with a pair of scissors and runs to free the missing girl whom he has chained up. Victor follows and just as he is about to kill Amaia, Flora shoots him.

Several weeks later, Flora's book, which she dedicated to her mother, was published, while Amaia and James inform Rosaura and Engrasi that they are expecting a child together. From a distance, a large hairy creature looks over the valley before going back into the forest.

== Cast ==
- Marta Etura as Amaia Salazar
  - Idurre Puertas as young Amaia
- Elvira Mínguez as Flora Salazar, Amaia's sister
- Francesc Orella as Fermín Montés
- Itziar Aizpuru as Tía Engrasi
- Carlos Librado "Nene" as Jonan Etxaide
- Miquel Fernández as Padre de Amaia
- Pedro Casablanc as Comisario General
- Colin McFarlane as Aloisius Dupree
- Benn Northover as James
- Paco Tous as Dr. San Martín
- Manolo Solo as Doctor Basterra
- Ramón Barea as Alfonso Álvarez de Toledo
- Patricia López Arnaiz as Rosaura Salazar

== Production ==
An adaptation of the eponymous novel by Dolores Redondo, the screenplay was penned by Luiso Berdejo. The film was produced by Atresmedia Cine, Nostromo Pictures and El Guardián Invisible AIE alongside Nadcon. It had the participation of Atresmedia.

== Release ==
Distributed by DeAPlaneta, the film was theatrically released in Spain on 3 March 2017.

== See also ==
- List of Spanish films of 2017
