= Cell 211 (novel) =

2003 novel by Francisco Pérez Gandul

Cell 211 (Spanish: Celda 211) is a Spanish novel by Francisco Pérez Gandul that tells the story of a prison guard named Juan Oliver who, before beginning work, is swept up in a prison riot.

== Synopsis ==
A new prison guard arrives at a prison Seville on the same day that a riot is incited by prisoners led by a prisoner named Malamadre. The guard is forced to convince the prisoners that he is one of them to escape as soon as possible.

== Adaptations ==
In 2009 a film of the same name based on the novel premiered, in which the setting was changed from Seville to Zamora. The film was a box office success and won eight Goya Awards, including Best Picture. After the success of the film, the publisher re-edited the book.
