= Zip & Zap and the Captain's Island =

- Film poster
- Spanish: Zipi y Zape y la isla del capitán
- Directed by: Oskar Santos
- Written by: Jorge Lara; Oskar Santos
- Based on: Zipi y Zape by José Escobar Saliente
- Produced by: Fernando Bovaira; Simón de Santiago; Urko Errazquin; Eneko Gutiérrez; Rosa Pérez; Francisco Ramos; Judit Stalter; Koldo Zuazua
- Starring: Teo Planell; Toni Gómez; Elena Anaya
- Cinematography: Daniel Sosa Segura
- Edited by: Carolina Martínez Urbina
- Music by: Fernando Velázquez
- Production companies: Mod Producciones; Kowalski Films; Atresmedia Cine; Movistar+; Zeta Cinema
- Distributed by: Buena Vista International
- Release date: 29 July 2016 (Spain)
- Running time: 105 minutes
- Country: Spain
- Language: Spanish

Zip & Zap and the Captain's Island (Spanish: Zipi y Zape y la isla del capitán) is a 2016 Spanish adventure film directed by Oskar Santos and starred by Teo Planell, Toni Gómez and Elena Anaya. This is the sequel to Zip & Zap and the Marble Gang.

== Plot ==
The two siblings, Zip and Zap break into a toy store of a relative to steal some toys, in revenge of a punishment. They upset a fire, which quickly engulfs the whole store after they escaped. Thus, the duo was given a whole array of punishments, with their parents continuously inventing new ones. They expected punishment to be bad, but to their surprise, they landed on a picturesque island, where their novelist father's editor reputedly lives. They take their car and drive through a road to find a house. But their car breaks down in front of the Orphanage, where Pamela (Miss Pam) lets them stay. They are fascinated by the life the children are allowed to live there, but they still disapproved of it, since they hadn't any parents. They went to sleep at night, but found their parents missing in the morning, coming to the conclusion that they went away, leaving them there. Then in another part, they start teasing the nun, while they sang, and slowly grew accustomed to the life. Then, it is shown that the parents were kidnapped by Ms. Pam, who turned out to be the fictional editor, who converted parents to children, to keep herself company. The children, along with Flecky and Macky, their parents younger forms, find out about the kidnapping. they make run to escape, with Pipi, who is the younger form of Ms. Pam, who traps them. The intelligent gorilla, who Salomon intended to kill, saved them, and took them to his den, where they see that Pamela was obsessed with book characters, and all the helpers of her were named after characters, and were manic or criminal. They also found out that the gorilla was a detective, who was sent to investigate the disappearances, and was turned into a gorilla. Miss Pam captures them, with the help of a person who has become invisible. They are locked in a dungeon, when the butler reveals that he is the father of Pamela. then he begins the backstory of Pamela. She had lost her mom, and her father wanted to atone for that, by giving Pam all she wanted. He gave her two submarines, a tool that takes her anywhere, and the shape/age shifting machine, which only worked inside the machine. She became angry, and hated her father. He kept on laboring on the machine, and made the dome bigger. They are helped to escape, and devise a plan to steal the key fragments to escape through a submarine. They escape from the mansion, but are caught and sunk by the other submarine, after she converts her father to a frog, and told him where she kept the key which destroyed the dome. While, in the submarine, they escaped by the teleporting device, and landed in the lab. Then a scuffle ensues, and Pam captures Flecky and Macky, and shows them that they were their parents. But before she could catch the duo, they escaped, and smashed the key to destroy the dome, then indicated by the frog. The duo converts their parents back, along with all other parents, and they reunite with family finally.

== Cast ==
- Elena Anaya as Ms. Pam
- Carolina Lapausa as the mother
- Aidan Cook as Principal Gorilla Performer
- Jorge Bosch as Pantuflo Zapatilla
- Teo Planell as Zipi (called Zip in the English version of this movie)
- Goizalde Núñez as Sor Enriqueta
- Toni Gómez as Zape (called Zap in the English version of this movie)
- Máximo Pastor as Maqui
- Tom Wilton as Gorilla
- Fermí Reixach as Jaime
- Ana Blanco de Córdova as Pipi
- Iria Castellano as Flequi
- Trinidad Iglesias
- Juan Codina as Salomón
