= Dolores Redondo =

Spanish writer (born 1969)

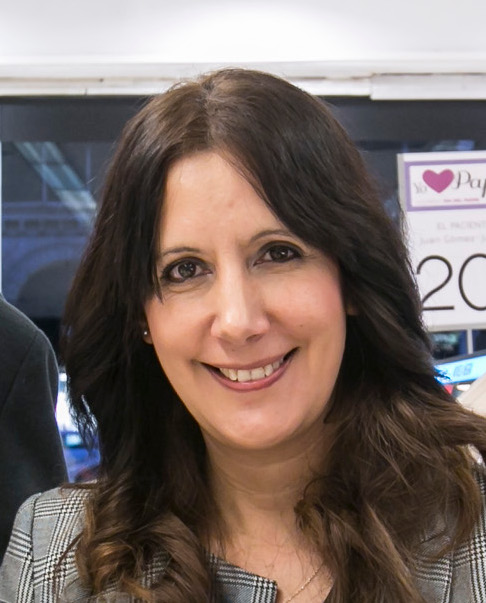
- In Zaragoza, March 2014
- Born: Dolores Redondo Meira; 1 February 1969 (age 57); San Sebastián, Spain
- Occupation: Writer

Dolores Redondo Meira (born 1 February 1969) is a Spanish writer of noir novels, author of the Baztán Trilogy, and winner of the 2016 Premio Planeta de Novela literary prize.

== Biography ==
Dolores Redondo began studying for her law degree at the University of Deusto, though she did not complete it. She studied gastronomy in San Sebastián, worked in several restaurants, and had her own before devoting herself professionally to literature. She has lived in the comarca of Ribera Navarra in Cintruénigo since 2006.

Redondo began writing literature with short stories and children's stories. In 2009 she published her first novel, Los privilegios del ángel, and in January 2013 she published El guardián invisible, the first volume of the Baztán Trilogy (Spanish: Trilogía del Baztán).

The second part, titled Legado en los huesos, followed in November of that year, and it finished in November 2014 with Ofrenda a la tormenta. The trilogy has gone on to sell more than 700,000 copies and has been translated into more than 15 languages.

The German producer Peter Nadermann, responsible for films of the Millennium series of Stieg Larsson, acquired the rights to its film adaptation almost immediately after the publication of the first novel. The film premiered in 2017.

Redondo is the winner of the 2016 Premio Planeta de Novela for the manuscript of Todo esto te daré, which was presented to the contest under the pseudonym Jim Hawkins with the false title Sol de Tebas.

== Works ==
=== Todo esto te daré ===
Winner of the Planeta Prize. Published by Planeta. Made into a French television mini-series (Tout cela je te le donnerai), the six-part miniseries was directed by Nicolas Guicheteau, co-production of Incognita, Las Niñas Pictures, Room 237, HDC and France Télévisions for France 2, produced with the participation of RTBF (Belgian television) and RTS (Swiss Radio Television), created and written by Pascal Fontanille, Françoise Charpiat, and Karine Lollichon.

=== El guardián invisible (The Invisible Guardian) ===
The first title of the trilogy begins with the discovery of the naked body of a local teenage girl on the banks of the river Baztán. Amaia Salazar, homicide inspector with the Policía Foral, is put in charge of the investigation, which leads her to return to Elizondo, the hometown she always wanted to escape from. Amaia faces an increasingly complicated case while struggling with her own familiar ghosts. Her investigation proves to be a race against time to catch a murderer demonstrating the horrific nature of reality while also evoking the most unsettling beings from the legends of the North.

The story moves between two fronts – professional, focused on solving a series of murders, and personal, which in this case becomes as important and surprising as the outcome of the investigation.

A film adaptation was released on 3 March 2017.

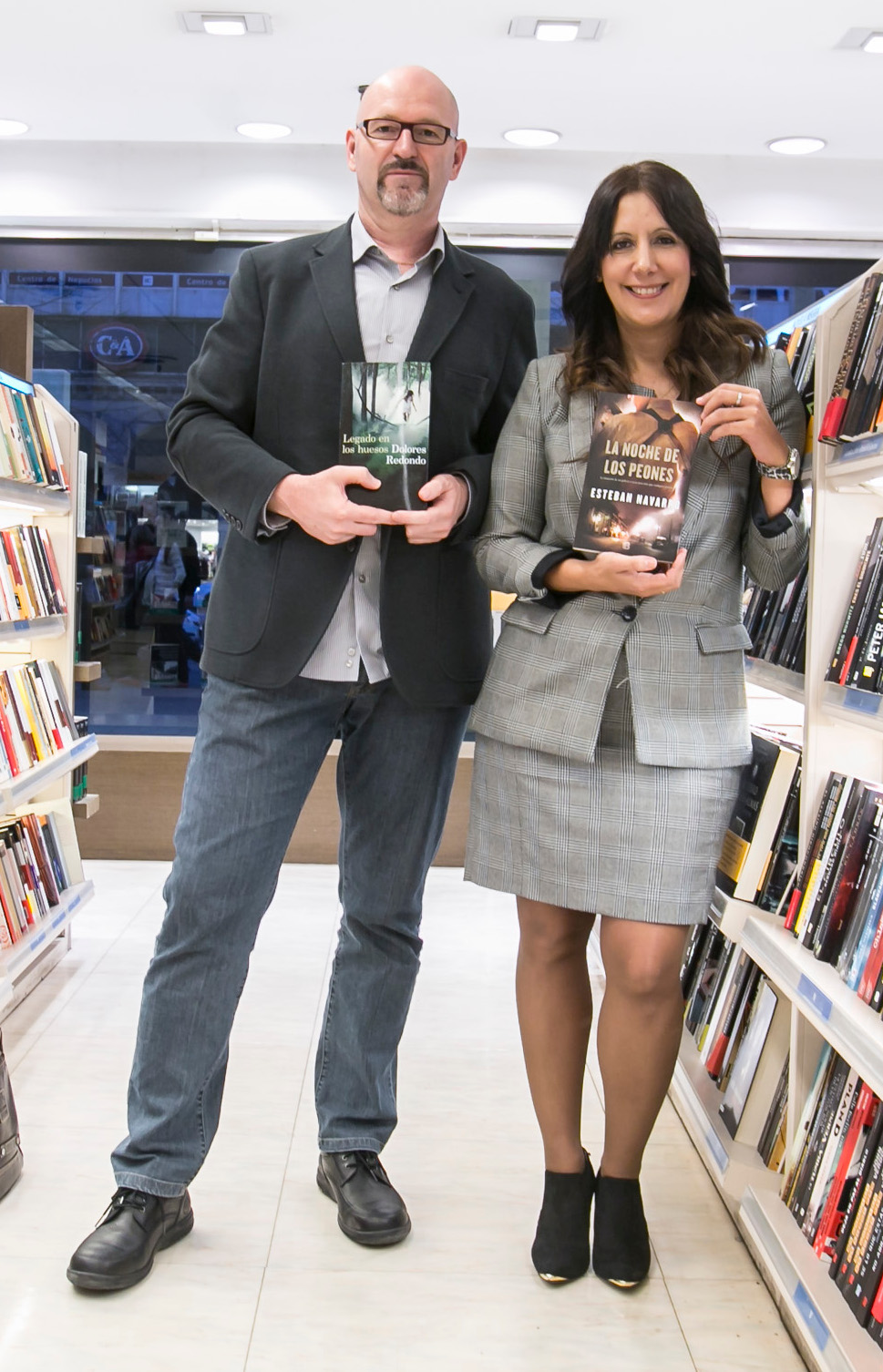
Dolores Redondo and Esteban Navarro in Zaragoza, March 2014

=== Legado en los huesos (The Legacy of the Bones) ===
Although the first volume completed the plot of the investigation, the second installment begins with the trial of the stepfather of a young woman, Johana Márquez. Amaia Salazar is called on by the police just after the accused has committed suicide in the bathroom of the courthouse and left a note with a single word: "Tarttalo". Amaia must discover its meaning and at the same time uncover disturbing details of her past.

A film adaptation was released in October 2019.

=== Ofrenda a la tormenta (Offering to the Storm) ===
The last entry in the trilogy was presented to the public on 25 November 2014.

During the presentation, the author admitted that the idea which inspired the whole story was for readers to understand that "even though many magical elements appear, the novel is very real and current."

A film adaptation was released in July 2020.

=== La cara norte del corazón (The North Face of the Heart) ===
Published 10 December 2019 by Planeta Publishing, La cara norte del corazón is a prequel to the Baztán Trilogy novels and explains Amaia Salazar's youth and education in FBI in United States.

In 2021, NBC Universal acquired the rights to adapt the novel into a television series format, to be produced by Heyday Films.

=== Other works ===
- Los privilegios del ángel (2009, republished in 2021)
- Esperando al diluvio (2022)
- Las que no duermen NASH (2024)

== Txantxigorri cakes ==
One of the peculiarities of the novels of Dolores Redondo is the appearance of txantxigorri cakes. The novels have made them better known outside of Navarre, where they are a popular dessert.
