= Carlos Librado =

Spanish actor and comedian (born 1976)

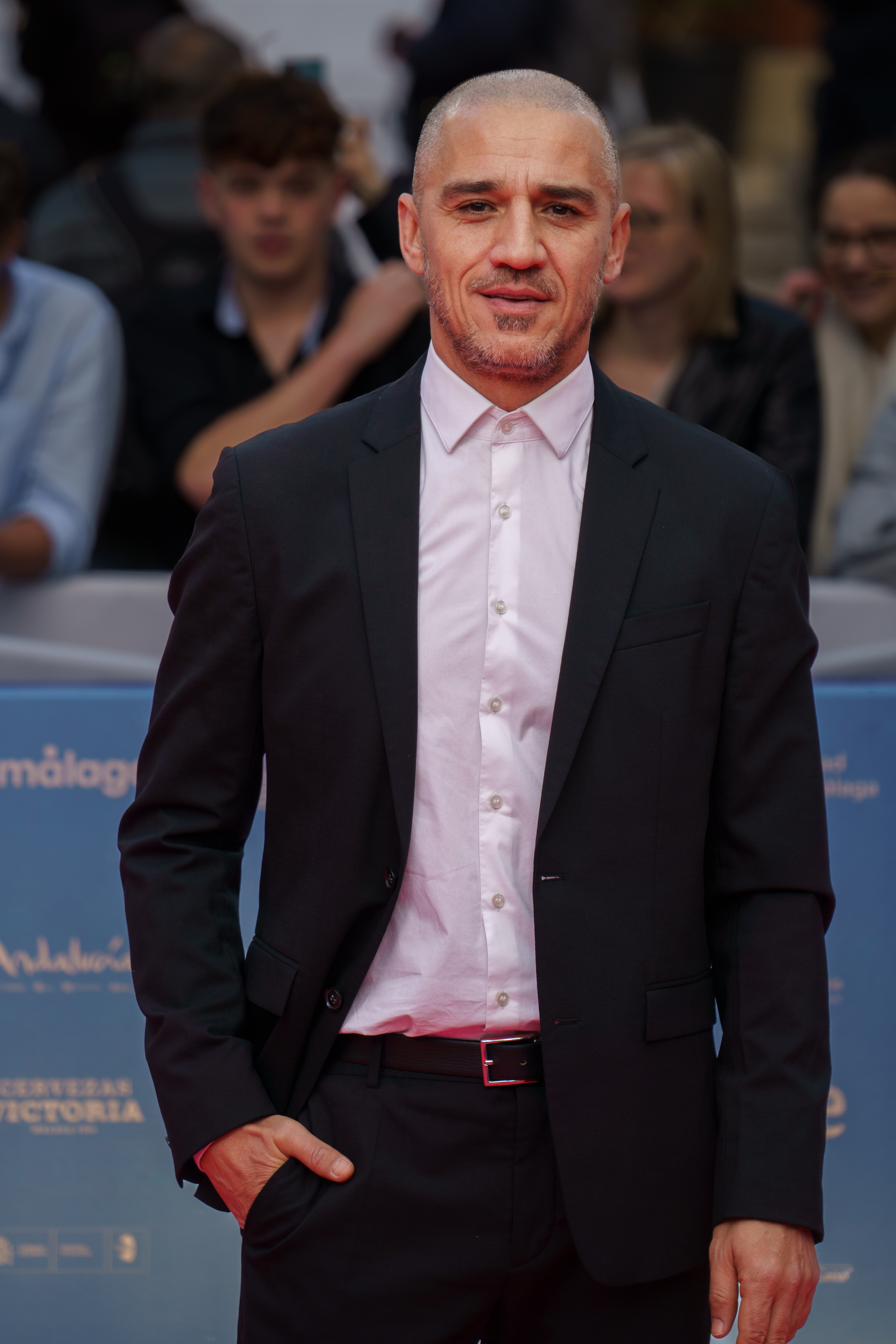
- Librado in 2025
- Born: Juan Carlos Librado Gallego; 9 August 1976 (age 48); Madrid, Spain
- Occupations: Actor; stand-up comedian; footballer

Juan Carlos Librado Gallego (born 9 August 1976), also known as Nene, is a Spanish actor and comedian.

== Life and career ==
Juan Carlos Librado Gallego was born in Madrid on 9 August 1976. Prior to his acting career, Librado developed a ten-year spell as a professional footballer, playing for lower-league sides RSD Alcalá, CD Badajoz, Alicante CF, and UD Lanzarote. He trained his acting chops in a theatre group of the University of Alicante. He has performed in stand-up TV and live comedy shows, and collaborated in El club de la comedia, Zapeando, and Pasapalabra.

Librado landed his screen debut with a minor role in the sitcom Aída.

He starred alongside Daniel Grao and Isak Férriz as Clemente "Clemen" Guerrero in the narcoseries Gigantes. He also appeared in Lejos de ti, Los relojes del diablo, Señor, dame paciencia, Dos años y un día, and La Moderna.

He made his feature film debut in The Invisible Guardian (2017), followed by performances in the subsequent installments of the saga, The Legacy of the Bones and Offering to the Storm. His film career also include roles in Undercover Wedding Crashers, Very Bald Trip, The Champion, and From Good to the Hood.
