= Thomas E. Sanders =

American production designer

- Born: c. 1953; San Pedro, California, United States
- Died: July 6, 2017 (aged 63)
- Occupation: Production designer
- Years active: 1990–2016

Thomas E. Sanders (often simply credited as Tom Sanders, sometimes Thomas Sanders) (1953 – July 6, 2017) was an American production designer. He has been nominated for two Academy Awards in the category Best Art Direction.

His filmography includes Hook (1991), Bram Stoker's Dracula (1992), Braveheart (1995), Saving Private Ryan (1998), Apocalypto (2006), and Crimson Peak (2015). Sanders died of cancer on July 6, 2017, aged 63.

== Filmography ==
- Revenge (1990)
- Days of Thunder (1990)
- Naked Tango (1991)
- Hook (1991)
- Bram Stoker's Dracula (1992)
- Maverick (1994)
- Braveheart (1995)
- Assassins (1995)
- Father's Day (1997)
- Saving Private Ryan (1998)
- Mission: Impossible 2 (2000)
- We Were Soldiers (2002)
- Rumor Has It (2005)
- Apocalypto (2006)
- Eagle Eye (2008)
- Edge of Darkness (2010)
- Venom in Vegas (2010, TV documentary)
- Secretariat (2010)
- Red Riding Hood (2011)
- After Earth (2013)
- Crimson Peak (2015)
- Star Trek Beyond (2016)

== Personal Life ==
Married Mariana Sanders in 2010, in 2012 they had a son Lucas Sanders.
