= Marta Etura =

Spanish actress

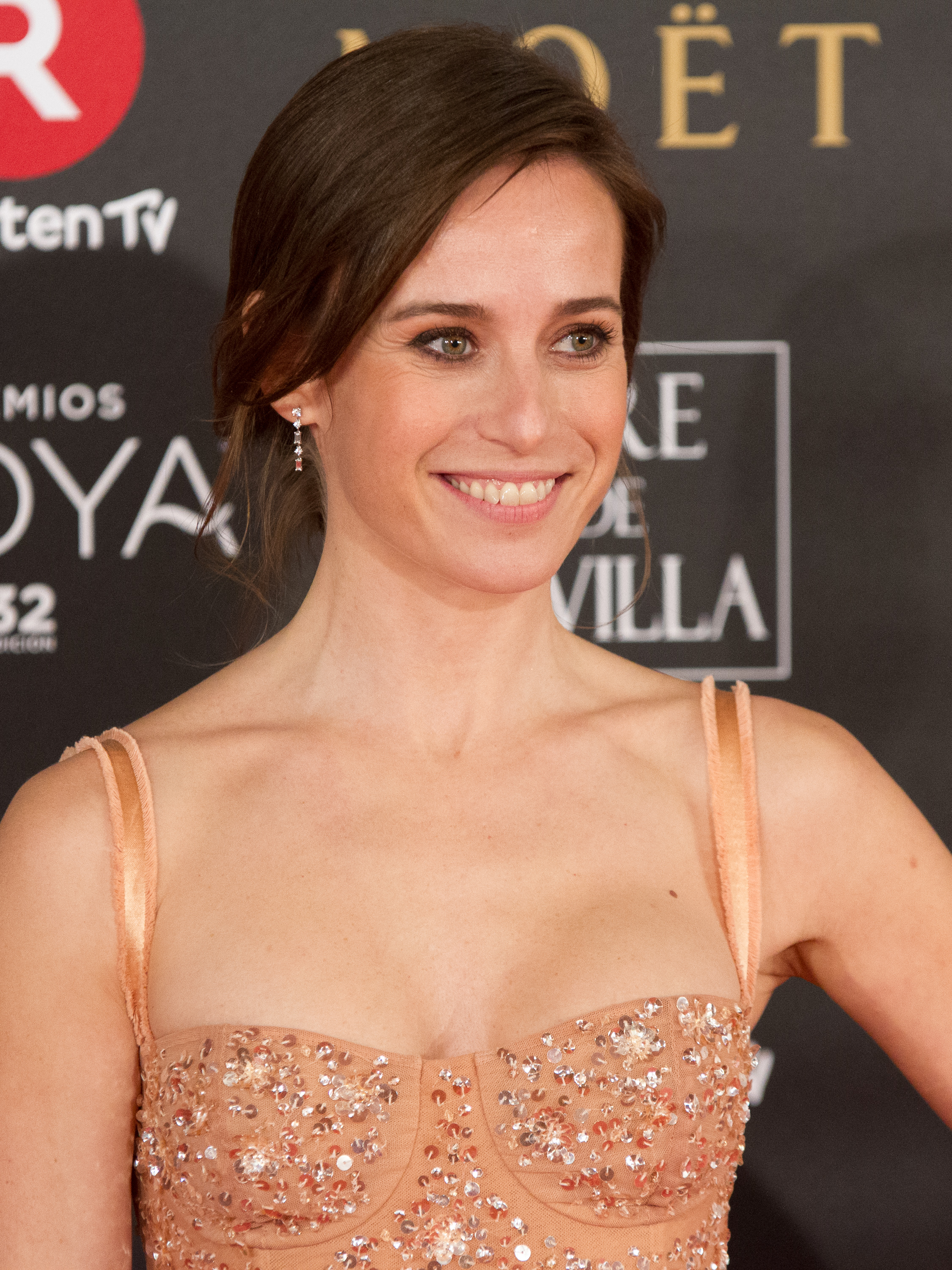
- Etura in 2018
- Born: Marta Etura Palenzuela; 28 October 1978 (age 47); San Sebastián, Gipuzkoa, Spain
- Occupation: Actress
- Years active: 2001–present
- Children: 1

Marta Etura Palenzuela (born on 28 October 1978) is a Spanish film and television actress. She is known for Your Next Life (2004), Cell 211 (2009), Sleep Tight (2011), and The Invisible Guardian (2017).

== Biography ==
Etura was born in 1978 in San Sebastián, where she studied at the French Lyceum. Willing to develop a career as an actress, she moved to Madrid and graduated from the acting school of Cristina Rota. She made her feature film debut as an actress in the 2001 comedy-drama film No Shame.

== Filmography ==
=== Film ===
Year	Title	Role	Notes	Ref.
2001	Sin vergüenza (No Shame)	Belén		
2002	El caballero Don Quijote (Don Quixote, Knight Errant)	Dulcinea		
2002	Thirteen Chimes (Trece campanadas)	María		
2002	La vida de nadie (Nobody's Life)	Rosana		
2003	La vida que te espera (Your Next Life)	Val		
2004	¡Hay motivo!		Segment "Por tu propio bien"	
2004	Frío sol de invierno (Cold Winter Sun)	Mimo		
2004	Entre vivir y soñar			
2005	Para que no me olvides (Something to Remember Me By)	Clara		
2006	Remake	Laura		
2006	Azuloscurocasinegro (Dark Blue Almost Dark)	Paula		
2007	Desierto Sur			
2007	Las trece rosas (13 Roses)	Virtudes González		
2007	Casual Day	Inés		
2008	Siete minutos			
2009	Celda 211 (Cell 211)	Elena		
2011	Mientras duermes (Sleep Tight)	Clara		
2011	Eva	Lana		
2012	The Impossible	Simone		
2013	Presentimientos (Inside Love)	Julia		
2013	Los últimos días (The Last Days)	Julia		
2014	Sexo fácil, películas tristes (Easy Sex, Sad Movies)	Marina		
2015	Hablar			
2016	El hombre de las mil caras (Smoke & Mirrors)	Nieves Fernández Puerto		
2017	El guardián invisible (The Invisible Guardian)	Amaia Salazar		
2019	El legado de los huesos (The Legacy of the Bones)	Amaia Salazar		
2020	Ofrenda a la tormenta (Offering to the Storm)	Amaia Salazar		
2022	El color del cielo	Olivia Bronte		
2025	Calle Málaga	Clara		

=== Television ===
- 2016: La sonata del silencio
- 2013: Águila Roja
- 2006: Vientos de agua
- 2003: La vida de Rita
- 2000: Raquel busca su sitio

=== Theatre ===
- 2012: Antígona
- 2008: Hamlet
- 2007: Despertares y celebraciones

== Accolades ==
- Shooting Stars Award 2006 by European Film Promotion

Goya Awards

Year	Category	Film	Result
2009	Best Supporting Actress	Celda 211	Won
2006	Best actress	Azuloscurocasinegro	Nominated
2005	Best Supporting Actress	Para que no me olvides	Nominated
2002	Best New Actress	La vida de nadie	Nominated

== Views ==
Etura has stated that "extremes, whether on the right or the left, are bad". She has been ofted labelled as a "right-wing actress", and she has claimed that that reputation may have damaged her career. After the 2016 Spanish general election, she defended that Mariano Rajoy should be allowed to form a government, since he had obtained a plurality.
