= Lotus Eaters (film) =

- Film poster
- Directed by: Alexandra McGuinness
- Written by: Alexandra McGuinness; Brendan Grant
- Produced by: Mark Lee
- Starring: Antonia Campbell-Hughes; Johnny Flynn; Benn Northover
- Cinematography: Gareth Munden
- Edited by: Herbert Hunger; Emer Reynolds
- Music by: Birger Clausen
- Production companies: McGuinnessLee; Fastnet Films; Irish Film Board
- Distributed by: Meneret Productions
- Release date: 21 April 2011 (Tribeca)
- Running time: 78 minutes
- Country: United Kingdom
- Language: English

Lotus Eaters is a 2011 British drama film directed by Alexandra McGuinness and starring Antonia Campbell-Hughes, Johnny Flynn and Benn Northover. It is McGuinness' directorial debut.

== Cast ==
- Antonia Campbell-Hughes as Alice
- Johnny Flynn as Charlie
- Benn Northover as Felix
- Liam Browne as Benedict
- Amber Anderson as Suzi
- Jay Choi as Lulu
- Gina Bramhill as Bella
- Daisy Lewis as Saskia
- Cynthia Fortune Ryan as Orna
- Katrena Rochell as Leni
- Alex Wyndham as Marlon
- Chloe Jenden as Casting Agent
- Anna Bondareva as Lottie
- Nicola Wren as Indira

== Reception ==
As of June 2020, the film holds an 8% approval rating on Rotten Tomatoes, based on thirteen reviews with an average rating on 4.92 out of 10.
