= Cell 211 =

- Theatrical release poster
- Spanish: Celda 211
- Directed by: Daniel Monzón
- Screenplay by: Jorge Guerricaechevarría; Daniel Monzón
- Based on: Celda 211 by Francisco Pérez Gandul
- Produced by: Emma Lustres; Borja Pena; Juan Gordon; Álvaro Augustin
- Starring: Luis Tosar; Alberto Ammann; Antonio Resines; Manuel Morón; Carlos Bardem; Luis Zahera; Vicente Romero; Fernando Soto; Marta Etura
- Cinematography: Carles Gusi
- Edited by: Mapa Pastor
- Music by: Roque Baños
- Production companies: Vaca Films; Morena Films; Telecinco Cinema; La Fabrique 2; Televisión de Galicia
- Distributed by: Paramount Pictures (Spain); La Fabrique de Films (France)
- Release dates: 4 September 2009 (Venice); 6 November 2009 (Spain)
- Running time: 113 minutes
- Countries: Spain; France
- Languages: Spanish; Basque; English

Cell 211 (Spanish: Celda 211) is a 2009 prison film directed by Daniel Monzón from a screenplay by Monzón and Jorge Guerricaechevarría and based on the 2003 novel of the same name by Francisco Pérez Gandul. The film stars Luis Tosar, Alberto Ammann, Antonio Resines, Manuel Morón, Carlos Bardem, Luis Zahera, Vicente Romero, Fernando Soto, and Marta Etura. In the film, rookie prison guard Juan Oliver (Ammann) is forced to go undercover as a prisoner after he becomes embroiled in a riot led by Malamadre (Tosar).

== Plot ==
Juan Oliver reports to work as a prison guard a day early. During his tour of the prison, a falling projectile knocks him unconscious and he is rushed to Cell 211. The projectile is revealed to be a diversion to allow the convicts to riot and hijack control of the prison. Aware of the impending violence, Juan's colleagues flee and leave him in the cell.

When Juan awakens in the midst of the chaos, he pretends to be a new inmate convicted of homicide. He is brought to the leader of the riot, Malamadre, who takes Juan under his wing after Juan suggests variations to the riot which will better equip the prisoners for negotiation. In reality, Juan seeks to keep channels of communication alive with the other guards and an incoming GEO team, who are preparing to storm the prison.

Malamadre discovers that Basque terrorists associated with ETA are being held in the prison, and seeks to use them as a political bargaining chip during negotiation. As news of the riot become public, a succession of other riots and demonstrations in the Basque Country follow. Afraid of political ramifications within the Basque Country, Spanish ministers hold back on exercising GEO interference, leaving Juan alone in the prison.

Juan's pregnant wife, Elena, learns about the riot and heads for the prison; there, protestors related to the inmates fight with police, causing Elena to be hit by an officer. A television inside the prison shows the news footage to the prisoners, revealing to Juan that Elena was at the protest. Fearful for her safety, Juan attempts to contact the guards, while Malamadre demands information of all those injured. The authorities respond with a list of four names; infuriated, Malamadre decide to kill one of the ETA prisoners. However, Juan intervenes and suggest they cut off an ear, an act he is forced to perform.

The authorities then provide additional information on the injured and Juan is told Elena is in the hospital, but recovering. Juan insists on talking to her but is rebuffed. Utrilla, the police guard who hit Elena, is suspended. Apache, an inmate close to Malamadre, learns the truth about Juan after contacting a friend in the police through a smuggled cell phone. He tells Juan he will give him a chance to defend himself before letting Malamadre know.

Later, Malamadre has Apache tell Juan that he needs to speak to him. He shows Juan footage from a protestor's cell phone, showing Elena being beaten by Utrilla. Juan insists Utrilla be brought in the prison, where he is confronted by Juan. Juan again insists on talking to Elena, but he learns she and her unborn child have died. In response, the prisoners viciously beat Utrilla until he reveals Juan is a prison guard. He asks Juan to tell the truth; instead, Juan slits Utrilla's throat.

Malamadre goes against advice to kill Juan, stating he does not believe Utrilla and that Juan's murder of Utrilla showcases his commitment to the prisoner's fight. Juan fails in a suicide attempt in his cell. Malamadre receives a call from the police negotiator, who gives him Juan's employment records, confirming Utrilla's claim, and asks him to work with them in exchange for release. Malamadre still refuses to kill Juan.

The government tell Malamadre they agree to his demands. Juan drags Utrilla's corpse in front of the government liaison and insists the government publicly agree, or they will kill the ETA prisoners. Malamadre tells Juan if the GEO team invades instead of a public agreement, he will either die, or kill Juan for his betrayal. As the GEO team quench the riot once they storm the prison, Apache kills Juan and severely injures Malamadre, who then works with the government against Apache.

== Cast ==
- Luis Tosar as Malamadre
- Alberto Ammann as Juan "Calzones" Oliver
- Antonio Resines as Utrilla
- Marta Etura as Elena
- Carlos Bardem as Apache
- Manuel Morón as Almansa
- Luis Zahera as Releches
- Vicente Romero as Tachuela
- Patxi Bisquert as Jon Arteaga
- Manolo Solo as the Prison Director
- Josean Bengoetxea as Antxon Elorza, "El Profesor"
- Anartz Zuazua as Asier Urruticoechea
- Fernando Soto as Armando Nieto
- David Selvas as Ernesto Dueñas
- Ricardo de Barreiro as Julián
- Antonio Durán Morris as Borrego
- Jesús Carroza as Elvis
- Ramiro Alonso as Geo ordenador

== Production ==
The screenplay was adapted from the homonymous novel by Francisco Pérez Gandul set during a prison riot. The film was produced by Vaca Films, Morena Films and Telecinco Cinema alongside Le Fabrique 2 and TVG. The film was fully shot in Zamora, most notably in the old prison of Zamora, unused since the 1980s and revamped for the occasion.

== Reception ==
=== Critical response ===
The film has received highly positive reviews from international film critics. Cell 211 has an approval rating of 98% on review aggregator website Rotten Tomatoes, based on 45 reviews, and an average rating of 7.6/10. The website's critical consensus states: "A uniquely sharp, well-acted prison drama, Cell 211 avoids exploitative thrills in favor of expertly ratcheted tension.

=== Accolades ===
An artistic success, the film won eight Goya Awards, including Best Picture, Best Director, Best Actor (Luis Tosar) and Best Adapted Screenplay.

Year	Award	Category	Nominee(s)	Result	Ref.
2010	Goya Awards	Best Film		Won	
2010	Goya Awards	Best Director	Daniel Monzón	Won	
2010	Goya Awards	Best Actor	Luis Tosar	Won	
2010	Goya Awards	Best Supporting Actress	Marta Etura	Won	
2010	Goya Awards	Best Supporting Actor	Carlos Bardem	Nominated	
2010	Goya Awards	Best Supporting Actor	Antonio Resines	Nominated	
2010	Goya Awards	Best Adapted Screenplay	Jorge Guerricaechevarría, Daniel Monzón	Won	
2010	Goya Awards	Best New Actor	Alberto Ammann	Won	
2010	Goya Awards	Best Original Score	Roque Baños	Nominated	
2010	Goya Awards	Best Production Supervision	Alicia Tellería	Nominated	
2010	Goya Awards	Best Cinematography	Carles Gusi	Nominated	
2010	Goya Awards	Best Editing	Mapa Pastor	Won	
2010	Goya Awards	Best Art Direction	Antón Laguna	Nominated	
2010	Goya Awards	Best Makeup and Hairstyles	Raquel Fidalgo, Inés Rodríguez	Nominated	
2010	Goya Awards	Best Sound	Sergio Burmann, Jaime Fernández, Carlos Faruolo	Won	
2010	Goya Awards	Best Special Effects	Raúl Romanillos, Guillermo Orbe	Nominated	
2010	19th Actors and Actresses Union Awards	Best Film Actor in a Leading Role	Luis Tosar	Won	
2010	19th Actors and Actresses Union Awards	Best Film Actor in a Secondary Role	Carlos Bardem	Won	
2010	19th Actors and Actresses Union Awards	Best Film Actress in a Minor Role	Marta Etura	Nominated	
2010	19th Actors and Actresses Union Awards	Best Film Actor in a Minor Role	Luis Zahera	Nominated	
2010	19th Actors and Actresses Union Awards	Best New Actor	Alberto Ammann	Won	

== See also ==
- List of Spanish films of 2009
