= Offering to the Storm =

2020 film

- Film poster
- Spanish: Ofrenda a la tormenta
- Directed by: Fernando González Molina
- Written by: Luiso Berdejo; Dolores Redondo
- Starring: Marta Etura; Leonardo Sbaraglia; Carlos Librado; Francesc Orella; Imanol Arias; Álvaro Cervantes; Susi Sánchez
- Cinematography: Xavi Giménez
- Edited by: Verónica Callón
- Music by: Fernando Velázquez
- Production companies: ARTE; Atresmedia Cine; Nadcon Film
- Distributed by: Netflix
- Release date: July 24, 2020
- Running time: 139 minutes
- Countries: Spain; Germany
- Languages: Spanish; French; English

Offering to the Storm (Spanish: Ofrenda a la tormenta) is a 2020 crime thriller film directed by Fernando González Molina, written by Luiso Berdejo and Dolores Redondo starring Marta Etura, Leonardo Sbaraglia and Paco Tous. It is the third and final installment in the Baztán Trilogy, following The Invisible Guardian and The Legacy of the Bones. The first two films in trilogy were also adapted from Redondo's novels.

== Premise ==
Inspector Amaia Salazar confronts the origins of her nightmares as she unfolds the darkest secrets of the Baztán valley.

== Cast ==
- Marta Etura as Amaia Salazar
- Leonardo Sbaraglia as Judge Markina
- Paco Tous as Dr. San Martín
- Álvaro Cervantes as Dr. Berasategui
- Pedro Casablanc as Comisario General
- Marta Larralde as Yolanda Berrueta
- Ana Wagener as Fina Hidalgo
- Elvira Mínguez as Flora Salazar
- Carlos Librado as Jonan Etxaide
- Imanol Arias as Father Sarasola
- Susi Sánchez as Rosario Salazar
- Benn Northover as James
- Alicia Sánchez as Elena Ochoa
- Colin McFarlane as Aloisius Dupree
- Alfredo Villa as Inspector Clemos
- Eduardo Rosa as Sub-Inspector Goñi

== Release ==
Offering to the Storm was released on July 24, 2020, on Netflix.
