= Benn Northover =

British actor and director (born 1981)

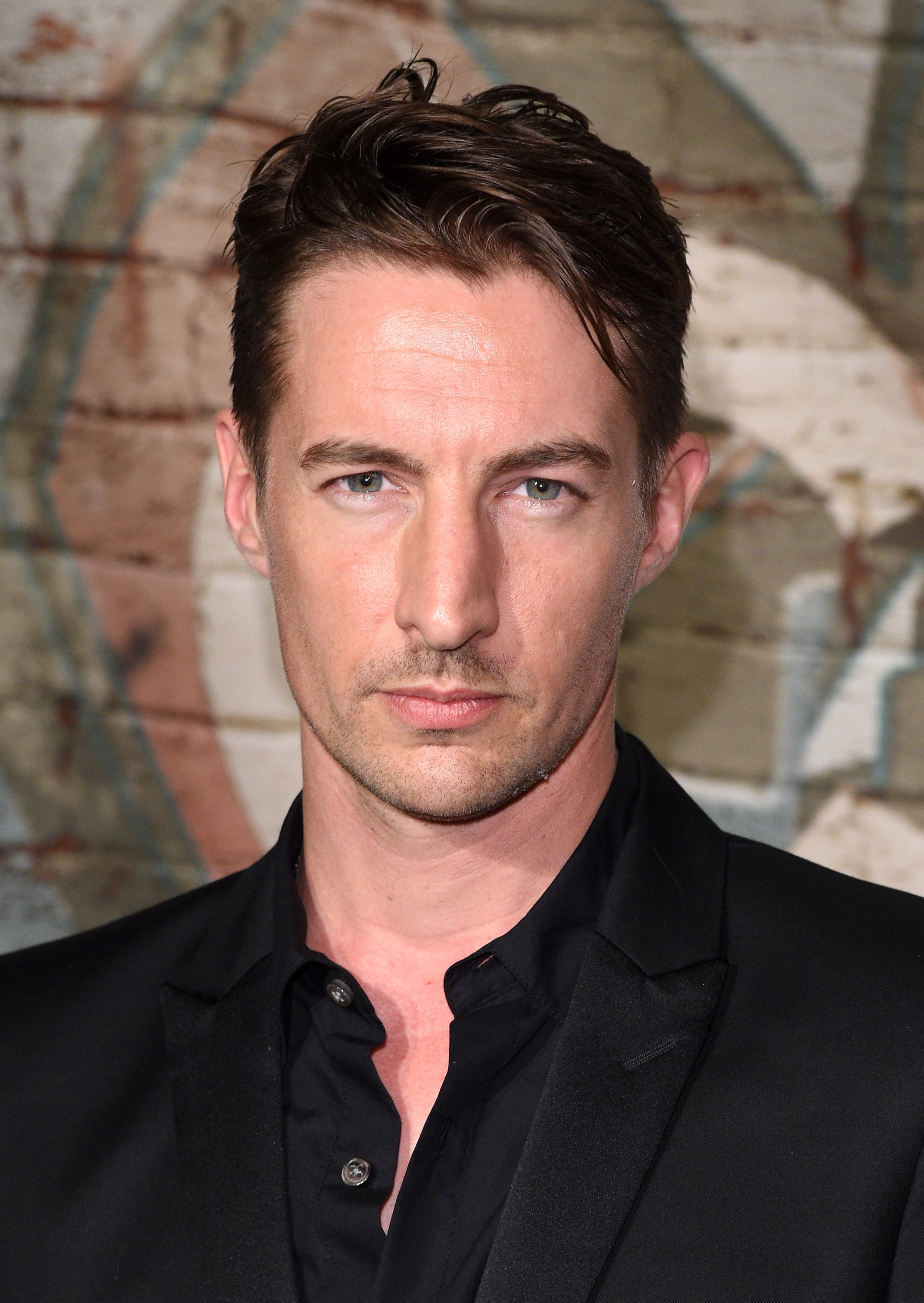
- Northover in 2014
- Born: 3 January 1981 (age 45); Ipswich, Suffolk, England
- Occupations: Actor, artist
- Years active: 2002–present

Benn Northover (born 3 January 1981) is an English-Irish actor, director and artist.

He made his screen debut in the drama Hostage to Terror. Northover's other notable film roles include Harry Potter and the Deathly Hallows, The Baztan Trilogy, Lotus Eaters, House of Boys, crime thriller Tutti i rumori del mare and director Mike Figgis' Lucrezia Borgia.

As a filmmaker his work includes documentary, fiction, and art film. Credits include Either Way starring Jodie Comer and the film series Mind Mapping starring Emma Corrin.

== Early life ==
Northover was born in Ipswich, Suffolk. After high school he studied art and film before moving to New York to study drama at The Stella Adler Studio.

== Acting career ==
Northover's early screen appearances included dramas Ultimate Force and Silent Witness. His first lead role was in gritty TV drama, Hostage to Terror, for which he received The Times Critics Choice. He later reunited with director Finn McGough on Avalanche of Terror about British climber Ken Jones. The series received critical acclaim around the world.

In 2010 Northover made his feature film debut in the hard-hitting AIDS drama House of Boys opposite Stephen Fry and Udo Kier, shedding 40 lbs to play the film's lead character, a young street hustler living with AIDS in the early 1980s. The film went on to receive several international awards. Northover then appeared in the 7th installment of the Harry Potter franchise, Harry Potter and the Deathly Hallows. In an interview with Paper Magazine, he described his experience on the production as "the biggest machine I have ever encountered."

In 2012 he starred in the hit indie feature Lotus Eaters opposite Antonia Campbell-Hughes and Johnny Flynn and the film adaptation of Donizetti's opera Lucrezia Borgia by director Mike Figgis.

In 2013 Italian director Federico Brugia cast Northover as the villain in his feature debut Tutti i rumori del mare. Set in the bleak underworld of the Hungarian human trafficking business. In an interview with AnOther Magazine Northover commented on his character in the film, saying "It's his personal demons that keep his conscience at a safe distance and eventually it's his human weaknesses that get the better of him." The film went on to win the special jury prize at the Annecy Italian Film Festival.

In 2014 Northover appeared in Je m'appelle Hmmm..., the directorial debut by agnès b., and in Frédéric Auburtin's epic ensemble film United Passions as Max Kahn, one of the founding members of FIFA, alongside Gérard Depardieu and Tim Roth.

In 2015 Northover narrated the feature documentary Marlon Brando: An Actor Named Desire, alongside Robert Duvall and Bernardo Bertolucci.

In 2017 Northover was cast in the Nostromo Pictures/Netflix screen adaptation of Dolores Redondo's best-selling three-part crime thriller The Baztán Trilogy directed by Fernando González Molina. The first installment of the trilogy The Invisible Guardian was released in 2018. Northover stars opposite Spanish actress Marta Etura.

In 2018 Northover also starred in Pelleas, artist Josephine Meckseper's highly political modern adaptation of Maurice Maeterlinck's play, Pelleas et Melisande. Northover played the title role of Pelleas opposite actress Alice Eve. The film premiered at The Whitney Museum of Art in New York.

It was announced in the spring of 2018 that production would begin that year on the next two films in The Baztán Trilogy; Legacy of the Bones and Offering to the Storm, with Etura and Northover reprising their roles and Molina returning to direct the two sequels for release in 2020.

== Art, cinema and cultural projects ==
Northover has directed several film and video projects, including the short film Either Way starring Jodie Comer and the film series ‘For Real’ starring Megan Rapinoe, music videos for artists such as Nick Drake and The The, and film projects for brands such as Loewe, Louis Vutton, Miu Miu, Marc Jacobs and Dior Homme.

He was invited to create a live video performance for David Bowie's Melt Down Festival, performed on stage at London's Queen Elizabeth Hall.

His photographic and written work has appeared in various publications including Italian Vogue, Dazed and Confused, AnOther Magazine, and the Mississippi press ‘conversations with filmmakers‘ book series. Northover interviewed fellow actor Kristen Stewart for the cover story of the S/S16 15th anniversary issue of AnOther Magazine.

Northover's published writings have included subjects as diverse as The Punk Rock movement, Human rights, The Bauhaus Movement and Avant Garde Cinema and interviews with filmmakers and artists such as Jonas Mekas, Jim Jarmusch, Quentin Crisp and David Bailey.

For over two decades, Northover was a close collaborator with legendary artist and filmmaker Jonas Mekas, leading to several film and video projects and a number of international gallery exhibitions at institutions including the Centre Pompidou and agnès b.'s Galerie du Jour in Paris. In 2012 Northover co-curated a landmark exhibition of underground cinema, with work by Mekas at the Serpentine Gallery in London alongside Hans-Ulrich Obrist.

Northover was an executive producer on the Douglas Gordon directed feature film I Had Nowhere to Go. The film was met with critical acclaim at the 2016 Locarno Film Festival, Toronto Film festival and the London BFI Film Festival.

Northover is a long time supporter and board member of the Anthology Film Archives, the legendary archive and cinema dedicated to the preservation and exhibition of independent cinema. In March 2017 Northover co-hosted a landmark benefit event in aid of the Archive alongside Steve Buscemi, Greta Gerwig, Michael Stipe and Patti Smith.

In April 2019, in memory of his longtime friend and collaborator Jonas Mekas, Northover read Mekas’ poem Remnants of a Journey, live on stage as part of the EarthFest festival held at the American Museum of Natural History in New York City. The concert was hosted by the global climate change organization Pathway to Paris. Northover was joined on stage by musicians Jesse Paris Smith and Rebecca Foon. Other performers included Patti Smith, Michael Stipe and the Harlem Gospel Choir. In 2020 Northover co-curated a group exhibition, dedicated to Mekas titled, ‘To Jonas With Love’. The exhibition involved mixed media work by a wide range of artists and filmmakers including Mike Figgis, Douglas Gordon, Lee Ranaldo, Stephen Shore and Jem Cohen.

A longtime advocate for AIDS awareness, Northover has hosted several fundraising events for the AIDS charity Acria. In 2015 he took part in a gala charity event, honouring playwright and activist Larry Kramer alongside fellow actors Joel Grey and Judith Light. Northover read Kramer's landmark AIDS awareness essay "1,112 and Counting"

Northover was invited to become the face of Italian couture fashion house Ermenegildo Zegna for their fall/winter 2015 and spring/summer 2016 campaigns, following in the steps of Adrien Brody and Sam Riley.

Northover was named one of Tatler magazine's 134 hottest people of 2014.

== Filmography ==
Title	Year	Role
Offering to the Storm	2020	James
Legacy of the Bones	2020	James
Pelléas	2019	Pelléas
The Invisible Guardian	2017	James
Marlon Brando: An Actor Named Desire	2015	Narrator
United Passions	2014	Max Kahn
Je m'appelle Hmmm…	2013	British Truck Driver
Tutti I Rumori del Mare	2012	Thomas
Harry Potter and the Deathly Hallows – Part 2	2011	Hogsmeade Death Eater
Lotus Eaters	2011	Felix
Lucrezia Borgia	2011	Pedro Calderon
Harry Potter and the Deathly Hallows – Part 1	2010	Hogsmeade Death Eater
House of Boys	2010	Jake
Abyss	2010	Elwood
oTripoli	2010	War Photographer
I Shouldn't Be Alive	2010	Ken Jones
Banged Up Abroad	2008	Rhys Partridge
A Letter From Greenpoint	2005	Benn
Ultimate Force	2005	PC Betts
Silent Witness	2004	Michael Otty
