= Chanchigorri cake =

Spanish and Basque savory pastry

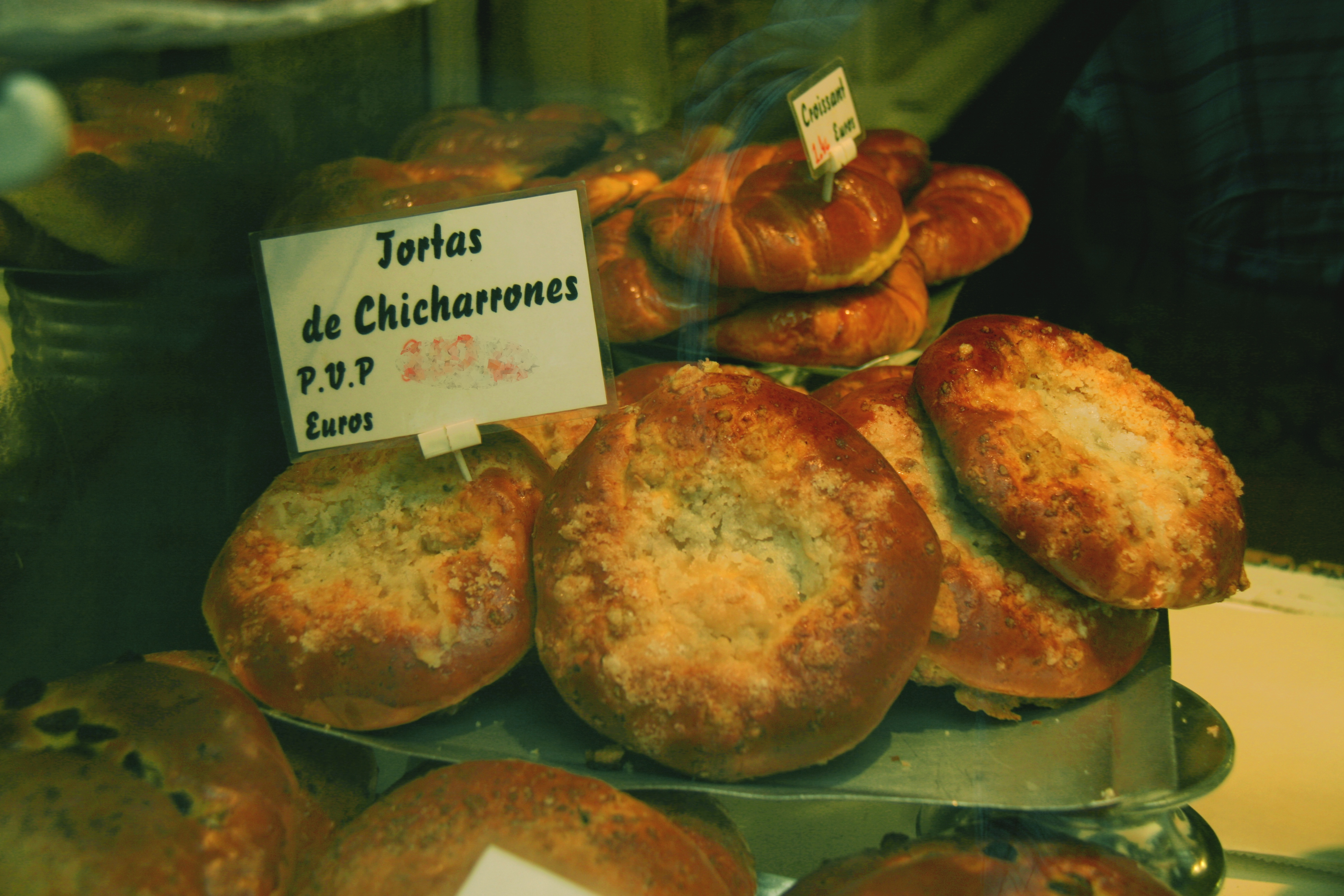
Chanchigorri cakes in a shop window.

A chanchigorri cake (Spanish: torta de chanchigorri, Basque: txantxigorri opila), also spelled txantxigorri or chalchigorri, is a Spanish pastry, common in the cuisine of Navarre. These desserts have a rounded shape. They are traditionally made at the time of pig slaughter, and their main ingredients are fried pork, lard, bread dough and sugar. They are usually served warm and are mainly marketed in the autumn months.

== Mentions in literature ==
Chanchigorri cakes appear in the Baztán Trilogy by writer Dolores Redondo.
