= House of Boys =

- Official theatrical poster
- Directed by: Jean-Claude Schlim
- Written by: Jean-Claude Schlim; Christian Thiry
- Produced by: Bob Bellion
- Starring: Layke Anderson; Benn Northover; Udo Kier
- Cinematography: Carlo Thiel
- Edited by: Katharina Schmidt
- Music by: Gast Waltzing
- Production companies: Delux Productions; Elsani Film
- Distributed by: Filmlichter (Germany)
- Release dates: 20 November 2009 (Luxembourg); 2 December 2010 (Germany)
- Running time: 117 minutes
- Countries: Luxembourg; Germany
- Languages: English, French, German, Luxembourgish

House of Boys is a 2009 Luxembourgish-German drama film directed and written by Jean-Claude Schlim, starring Layke Anderson, Benn Northover and Udo Kier. The film follows the story of Frank, a gay teenager in the 1980s who runs away from his home to start a new life and later struggles with a recent AIDS diagnosis.

== Plot ==
Gay teenager Frank (Layke Anderson) is part of a typical bourgeois family in Luxembourg in 1984. For unknown reasons, he decides to run away with his best friend, Rita. They settle in Amsterdam, where Frank starts enjoying life. When Rita leaves with her boyfriend, Frank is left with nowhere to go. He goes to a gay cabaret bar called the "House of Boys" in which young, attractive men dance and provide sexual services for older men. The place is run by the mysterious performer and drag queen Madame (Udo Kier), who takes Frank in and employs him. In the club he meets Angelo, who aspires to transition from male to female, and raises funds for her gender reassignment surgery; and Jake (Benn Northover), a veteran performer and favorite of customers, who considers himself to be straight. Frank falls in love with him, but struggles with Jake's claim of heterosexuality in light of his male-hustler lifestyle. Jake's long time girlfriend steals his money and uses it to have an abortion. He breaks up with her and finds comfort in Frank's arms. They start a relationship which for both seems to transcend superficial sex into love. Soon Jake begins to fall ill, faints, and develops spots on his skin. He's diagnosed with AIDS. Meanwhile, Europe sees the start of the AIDS epidemic. The remainder of the film chronicles Jake's decline and eventual death while the "House of Boys" closes. The closing scenes show Frank travelling to Morocco to scatter Jake's ashes over the sea.

== Critical reception ==
The film received mixed to positive reviews from critics. Review aggregation website Rotten Tomatoes gives the film a score of 56% based on reviews from 9 critics, with a rating average of 6.3 out of 10.

Critics agreed the film starts slowly but later develops into a deeper story. Jeannette Catsoulis from the New York Times wrote a positive review about the film, and said that it "conveys an emotional honesty that overrides its dated style."

== Music ==
The film soundtrack uses music from a number of renowned artists like Cockney Rebel, Jimmy Somerville, Roy Orbison, Spandau Ballet, Soft Cell and ends with "Là-bas" (Somewhere) (music by Cyril Collard and lyrics by Corine Blue) and performed by Nyco Lilliu.

== Awards and prizes ==
- 2009, "Best Film award" at the Lëtzebuerger Filmpräis
- 2011, Critics award for best film and audience award for best film at the Inside Out LGBT Film and Video Festival
