= Crimson Peak =

2015 film by Guillermo del Toro

- Theatrical release poster
- Directed by: Guillermo del Toro
- Written by: Guillermo del Toro; Matthew Robbins
- Produced by: Thomas Tull; Jon Jashni; Guillermo del Toro; Callum Greene
- Starring: Mia Wasikowska; Jessica Chastain; Tom Hiddleston; Charlie Hunnam; Jim Beaver
- Cinematography: Dan Laustsen
- Edited by: Bernat Vilaplana
- Music by: Fernando Velázquez
- Production companies: Legendary Pictures; Double Dare You
- Distributed by: Universal Pictures
- Release dates: September 25, 2015 (Fantastic Fest); October 16, 2015 (United States)
- Running time: 119 minutes
- Countries: United States; Mexico; Canada
- Language: English
- Budget: $55 million
- Box office: $74.7 million

Crimson Peak is a 2015 gothic romance supernatural horror film directed by Guillermo del Toro, and written by del Toro and Matthew Robbins. The film stars Mia Wasikowska, Tom Hiddleston, Jessica Chastain, Charlie Hunnam, and Jim Beaver. The story, set in Victorian-Era England, follows an aspiring author who is settled in a remote Gothic mansion in Cumberland, England—accompanied by her new husband and his sister—where she seeks to decipher the mystery behind the ghostly visions that haunt her new home.

In 2006, a spec script written by Del Toro and Robbins was sold to Universal Pictures, with Del Toro set to direct. Development was delayed due to scheduling conflicts. The film was described as a "ghost story and gothic romance" heavily inspired by other horror films, such as The Haunting, The Innocents and The Shining. Principal photography began at Pinewood Toronto Studios in Toronto, Ontario on February 10, 2014, with additional filming in Hamilton, and ended on May 16 that year. The film was produced by Legendary Pictures and Del Toro's production company Double Dare You.

Crimson Peak premiered at Fantastic Fest on September 25, 2015, and was released in the United States on October 16, 2015, in standard and IMAX formats. The film received generally positive reviews from critics but underperformed at the box-office, grossing $74 million worldwide. The film received three nominations at the 21st Empire Awards, including Best Horror. It received nine nominations at the 42nd Saturn Awards, winning three, including Best Horror Film, Best Supporting Actress for Chastain and Best Production Design for Thomas E. Sanders.

== Plot ==
In 1887 Buffalo, New York, American heiress Edith Cushing, daughter of wealthy businessman Carter Cushing, is visited by her mother's ghost who warns, "Beware of Crimson Peak."

In 1901, Edith is now a budding author, and meets English baronet Sir Thomas Sharpe and his sister, Lucille. Thomas seeks investors for his invention, a digging machine to revive his family's clay mines, but Mr. Cushing rejects his proposal. Thomas and Edith become romantically attached, leading her father to hire a private detective who uncovers unsavory facts about the Sharpe siblings. Mr. Cushing bribes them to leave America, forcing Thomas to "break Edith's heart" by disparaging her and her novel.

Thomas returns Edith's manuscript with a letter explaining his actions, and they reconcile. Mr. Cushing is brutally murdered, raising the suspicions of Edith's childhood friend, Dr. Alan McMichael. Thomas marries Edith—giving her a ring taken from Lucille—and they arrive at Allerdale Hall, the Sharpes' dilapidated Cumberland mansion, which is sinking into the red clay mine below. Lucille plies Edith with tea made from "firethorn berries" and Thomas persuades her to put her father's fortune toward his machine.

Edith begins to notice Thomas's absence from their shared bedroom during the night. She is plagued by nightmares and continually visited by gruesome red ghosts around Allerdale, one of which tricks her into opening a closet, where she discovers wax phonograph cylinders, before chasing her into the cellars, where she finds a locked trunk engraved with the name "Enola". Soon after this, Thomas tells Edith that the estate is referred to as "Crimson Peak" due to the warm clay from the mine leaching up from the ground and staining the winter snow, turning it bright red. Thomas takes Edith on a trip to the local post office for some fresh air after Edith demands to leave, where she receives a letter addressed to E. Sharpe. Snowed in for the night, they finally have sex, which Lucille is infuriated to learn.

Edith steals a key from Lucille bearing the inscription "Enola" and unlocks the trunk to find a gramophone and secret documents. Using the gramophone to listen to the audio recordings on the wax cylinders, and while reading the paper documents, Edith learns that Thomas previously married three other wealthy women—including Enola Sciotti, the letter's intended recipient—and that Lucille has been poisoning Edith with tea as part of the siblings' "marriage and murder" scheme to finance Thomas's inventions. Edith confronts her husband and sister-in-law, catching them in an incestuous embrace, and Lucille pushes her from a balcony.

Alan has learned what Mr. Cushing uncovered about the Sharpes: Thomas's multiple marriages and Lucille's time in a mental institution. He travels to Allerdale Hall to rescue Edith, arriving just after she has been pushed. Tending to her injuries, Alan prepares to leave with Edith, but Lucille stabs him and demands that Thomas finish the job. Thomas, instead, inflicts an intentionally nonfatal stab wound to Alan before hiding him in the cellar.

Lucille forces Edith to sign a transfer deed granting the Sharpes ownership of her estate, and confesses to having murdered Thomas's previous wives and having borne a child with Thomas that soon died—these are the ghosts who have appeared to Edith. Lucille admits to murdering Edith's father, as well as her own mother when she discovered Lucille and Thomas's sexual relationship. Edith stabs Lucille with her pen and flees, but is confronted by Thomas, who has truly fallen in love with her. He burns the deed and begs his sister to join him and Edith in a new life together, but an enraged Lucille fatally stabs him. She pursues Edith with the cleaver she used to kill her mother, but is halted by Thomas's ghost, allowing Edith to kill her with a shovel. Edith silently bids Thomas farewell before he vanishes.

Edith and Alan are rescued by the villagers, and Lucille becomes the ghost of Allerdale Hall, playing her piano for eternity. Some time later, Edith writes a novel titled Crimson Peak.

== Cast ==
- Mia Wasikowska as Edith Cushing
- Jessica Chastain as Lucille Sharpe
- Tom Hiddleston as Thomas Sharpe
- Charlie Hunnam as Dr. Alan McMichael
- Jim Beaver as Carter Cushing
- Burn Gorman as Holly
- Leslie Hope as Mrs. McMichael, Alan's mother
- Jonathan Hyde as Ogilvie
- Doug Jones as the ghosts of Edith's mother and of Lady Sharpe

== Production ==
=== Pre-production ===
[B]asically what it is, is a really, really, almost classical Gothic romance ghost story, but then it has two or three scenes that are really, really disturbing in a very, very modern way. Very, very disturbing, it's a proper R rating. And it's adult.

— Guillermo del Toro

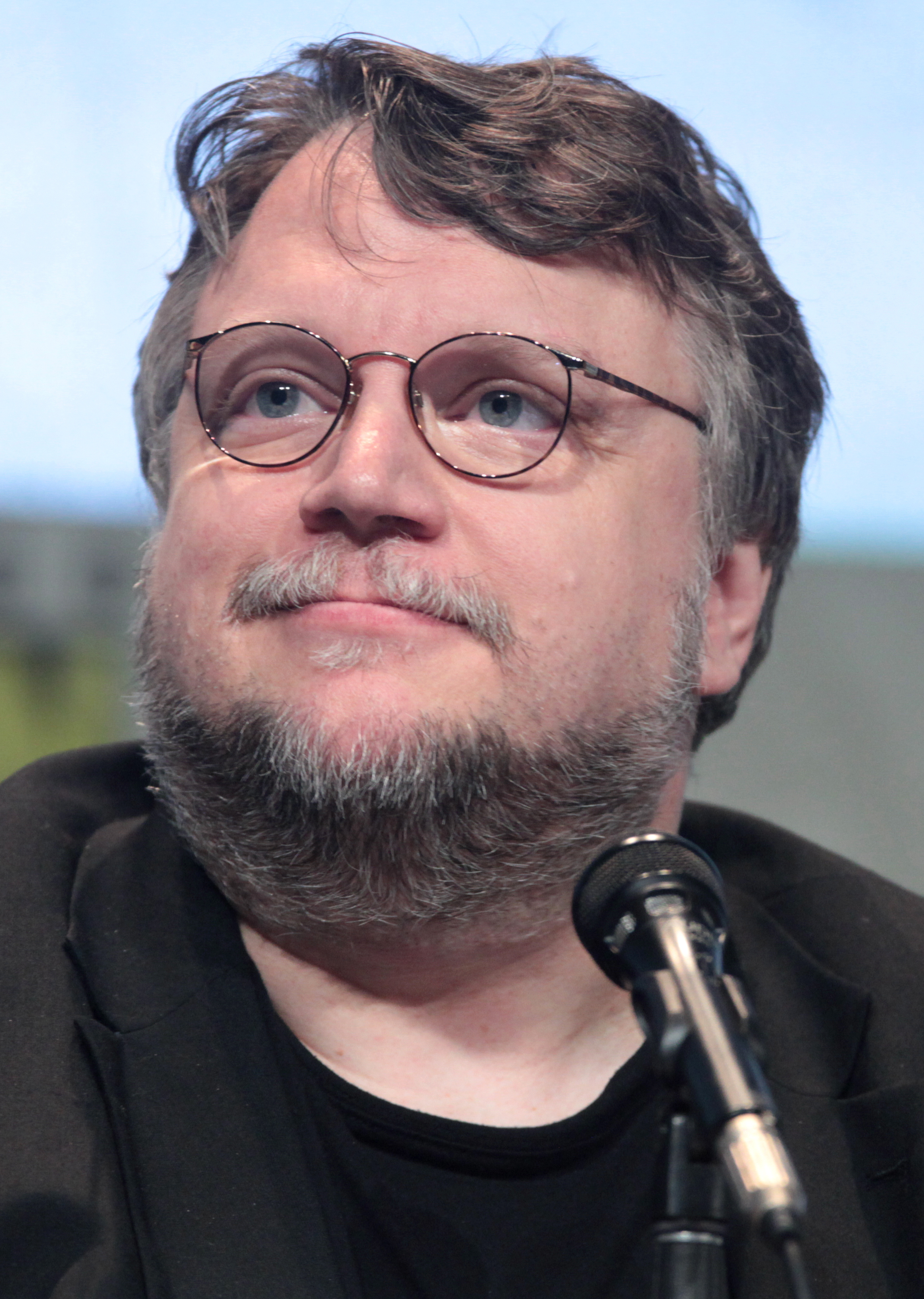
Guillermo del Toro at the 2015 San Diego Comic-Con promoting the film

Del Toro and Robbins wrote the original spec script after the release of Pan's Labyrinth in 2006. It was sold quietly to Donna Langley at Universal. Del Toro planned to direct the film, but postponed the project to make Hellboy II: The Golden Army, and then again to work on The Hobbit films. Langley suggested that del Toro produce the film for another director, but he could not find one he deemed suitable. While directing Pacific Rim, del Toro developed a good working relationship with Legendary Entertainment's Thomas Tull and Jon Jashni, who asked what he wanted to do next. Del Toro sent them his screenplays for a film adaptation of At the Mountains of Madness, a Western adaptation of The Count of Monte Cristo, and Crimson Peak. The producers deemed the last of these "the best project for us, just the right size". Universal allowed del Toro to move the project to Legendary, with the caveat that they could put up money for a stake in the film.

Del Toro called the film a "ghost story and gothic romance". He has described it as "a very set-oriented, classical but at the same time modern take on the ghost story", and said that it would allow him to play with the genres' conventions while subverting their rules. He stated, "I think people are getting used to horror subjects done as found footage or B-value budgets. I wanted this to feel like a throwback."

Del Toro wanted the film to honor the "grand dames" of the haunted house genre, namely Robert Wise's The Haunting and Jack Clayton's The Innocents. The director intended to make a large-scale horror film in the tradition of those he grew up watching, such as The Omen, The Exorcist, and The Shining. He cited the latter as "another Mount Everest of the haunted house movie", praising the high production values and Stanley Kubrick's control over the large sets.

British playwright Lucinda Coxon was enlisted to rewrite the script with del Toro, in hopes of bringing it a "proper degree of perversity and intelligence", but she is not credited on the finished film.

Benedict Cumberbatch and Emma Stone were originally cast, but both dropped out of the production. Tom Hiddleston and Mia Wasikowska took over their respective roles, making this film their second collaboration after Only Lovers Left Alive. Crimson Peak is also the second collaboration between Wasikowska and Chastain after starring together in Lawless. The film was titled Haunted Peak while under production, a title used only for the studio booking. In the summer of 2013, Burn Gorman joined the cast in a cameo role.

In October 2013, Chastain went through a full-body cast process for the film. She posted pictures on her Facebook of her getting her head, torso, and fists cast. Composer Fernando Velázquez composed the film's score. Callum Greene, Jon Jashni and Thomas Tull helped produce the film.

=== Filming ===
Principal photography began in Toronto at Pinewood Toronto Studios on February 10, and ended on May 16, 2014. On April 28, filming started on Queen Street South, between Main Street and King Street in Hamilton, Ontario. That section of roadway was closed to traffic and covered in topsoil to assist in the look of the setting. The building to the west figured prominently. Filming also took place in Kingston, Ontario on April 14, 2014. The trailer features PJ Harvey's cover of "Red Right Hand".

== Release ==
Crimson Peak held its world premiere at Fantastic Fest, in Austin, Texas, on September 25, 2015, with Del Toro in attendance, and was held as a "secret screening". The film was also screened at the UGC Cine Cite Bercy on September 28 in Paris, France. The film premiered at Lincoln Square in New York on October 14, 2015. The film was released theatrically in the United States on October 16, 2015, in standard and IMAX formats.

=== Promotion ===
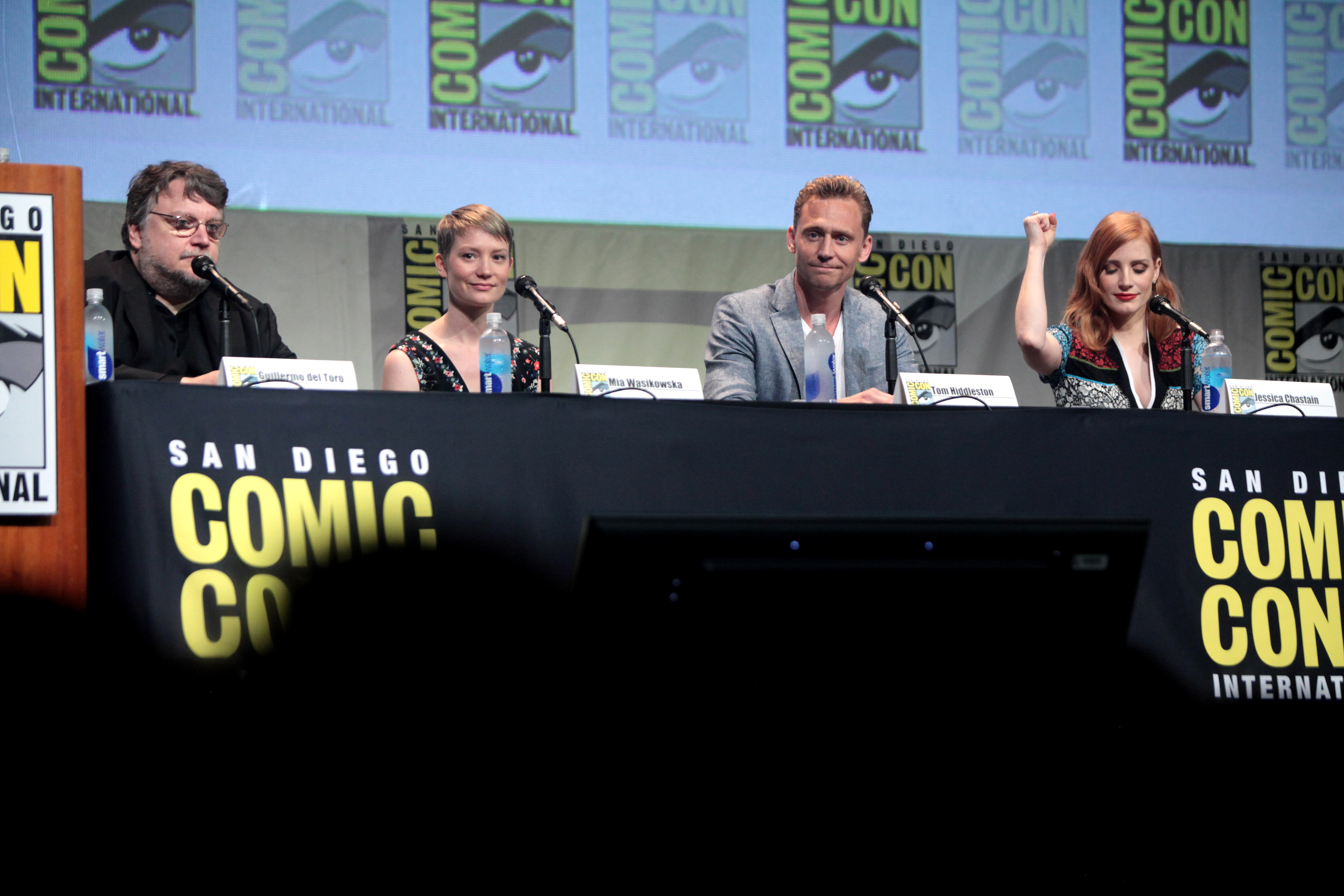
The cast and crew of Crimson Peak at the 2015 San Diego Comic-Con to promote the film.

At San Diego Comic-Con on July 23, 2014, del Toro helped create props for the Legendary Pictures booth by allowing fans to walk through snow-covered gates, and a gallery of props from the set and costumes from the film, including a bloody knife and moth print in the wallpaper that spell out the word "fear". On February 13, 2015, the first trailer for the film was released online. On May 13, 2015, the second trailer was released online, together with an international trailer featuring alternate material.

On June 16, 2015, four character posters were released, featuring the four main cast members. On July 6, 2015, four alternate character posters were released, less than a week prior to Legendary Pictures' Crimson Peak panel at San Diego Comic-Con.

On July 11, 2015, John Murdy, creative director of Universal Studios Hollywood's Halloween Horror Nights, announced that the film would be adapted into a maze for the 2015 season. A novelization of the film, by Nancy Holder, was released on October 20, 2015. Publisher Titan Books had previously published the novelization of del Toro's film Pacific Rim.

== Reception ==
=== Box office ===
Crimson Peak grossed $31.1 million in North America and $43.6 million in other territories for a worldwide total of $74.7 million, against a budget of $55 million.

In the United States and Canada, the film opened simultaneously with Bridge of Spies, Goosebumps, and Woodlawn, on October 16, 2015, in 3,501 theaters, as well as IMAX and premium large formats. Pre-release tracking projected the film to open to around $15–20 million. It made $855,000 from its early Thursday night showings at 2,178 theaters and $5.2 million on its opening day. It ended up opening to $12.8 million, with IMAX comprising $2.3 million from 365 IMAX theaters. The film suffered from a very competitive PG-13 adult market where such films as The Martian and Bridge of Spies were overperforming. Women represented 60% of the film's audience with 55% 25 or older.

Outside North America, Crimson Peak opened in 66 countries. It earned $13.6 million in its opening weekend from 55 territories. It opened at No. 2 in Russia and the CIS ($2.6 million; behind The Martian) and Spain ($1.1 million) and No. 5 in the U.K., Ireland and Malta ($1.5 million). It opened in Belgium, Greece, Israel, Italy, Poland, Portugal, and Trinidad around October 22–23.

=== Critical response ===
Crimson Peak received positive reviews from critics. On Rotten Tomatoes, the film has a 72% approval rating based on 284 reviews, with an average rating of 6.60/10. The site's critical consensus reads, "Crimson Peak offers an engaging – albeit somewhat slight – diversion driven by a delightfully creepy atmosphere and director Guillermo del Toro's brilliant knack for unforgettable visuals." Metacritic gives the film a score of 66 out of 100, based on 38 critics, indicating "generally favorable" reviews. On CinemaScore, audiences gave the film an average grade of "B−" on an A+ to F scale.

After attending an early screening, horror writer Stephen King called the film "gorgeous and just fucking terrifying", and said it "electrified" him like Sam Raimi's The Evil Dead, whose distribution he helped secure with a rave review in 1982. King's son, writer Joe Hill, called Crimson Peak "del Toro's blood-soaked Age of Innocence, a gloriously sick waltz through Daphne du Maurier territory". IGN reviewer Scott Collura gave the film an 8.5 out of 10 score, saying, "Featuring memorable performances, amazing production design, and a hard edge that is too often lacking in horror films these days, it nonetheless also manages to subvert some long-standing tropes about the gothic romance genre which inspired it." Writing on Roger Ebert's official website and giving the movie four stars out of four, Sheila O'Malley said "Watching del Toro's films is a pleasure because his vision is evident in every frame. Best of all, though, is his belief that 'what terrifies him will terrify others.' He's right." Robbie Collin of The Daily Telegraph wrote that "Its sombre sincerity and hypnotic, treasure-box beauty make Crimson Peak feel like a film out of time – but Del Toro, his cast and his crew carry it off without a single postmodern prod or smirk. The film wears its heart on its sleeve, along with its soul and most of its intestines." The Guardian lead film critic Peter Bradshaw gave the film four stars out of five, wrote that "Guillermo del Toro's gothic fantasy-romance Crimson Peak is outrageously sumptuous, gruesomely violent and designed to within an inch of its life." Observer critic Mark Kermode considered it the director's best film since Pan's Labyrinth and noted the various gothic and horror influences - including Sheridan Le Fanu, Robert Stevenson's Jane Eyre, and Hitchcock's Rebecca - on "one of the year's most handsomely mounted productions."

Dan Jolin of Empire wrote that "It may be a little overwrought for some tastes, borderline camp at points, but if you're partial to a bit of Victorian romance with Hammer horror gloop and big, frilly night-gowns, GDT delivers an uncommon treat." Bilge Ebiri of Vulture wrote that "It doesn't always seem to know what it wants to be. But it's still full of marvels." Sara Stewart of the New York Post wrote that "Chastain and Wasikowska take center stage while Hiddleston flutters around like one of Allerdale's huge black moths. Watching the women square off within del Toro's eye-popping, painterly palette is a feast for the eyes, if not particularly substantial fare for the mind." A.O. Scott of The New York Times wrote that "The film is too busy, and in some ways too gross, to sustain an effective atmosphere of dread. It tumbles into pastiche just when it should be swooning and sighing with earnest emotion." Michael O'Sullivan of The Washington Post wrote that "The film by the stylish fantasist Guillermo del Toro looks marvelous, but has a vein of narrative muck at its core." Tom Huddleston of Time Out London wrote that "All three actors work hard... and when the melodrama hits fever pitch, Crimson Peak lurches into life. But overall this lacks weight and intensity: a Brontë-esque bauble smeared in twenty-first-century slickness." Peter Debruge of Variety wrote that "Aflame with color and awash in symbolism, this undeniably ravishing yet ultimately disappointing haunted-house meller is all surface and no substance, sinking under the weight of its own self-importance into the sanguine muck below." Chris Nashawaty of Entertainment Weekly wrote that "Crimson Peak is a cobwebs-and-candelabras chamber piece that's so preoccupied with being visually stunning it forgets to be scary."

=== Accolades ===
Award	Category	Recipient(s)	Result	Ref.
Empire Awards	Best Horror	Crimson Peak	Nominated	
Empire Awards	Best Costume Design	Crimson Peak	Nominated	
Empire Awards	Best Make-Up and Hairstyling	Crimson Peak	Nominated	
Empire Awards	Best Production Design	Crimson Peak	Nominated	
Fangoria Chainsaw Awards	Best Wide Release Film	Crimson Peak	Runner-up	
Fangoria Chainsaw Awards	Best Screenplay	Guillermo del Toro and Matthew Robbins	Nominated	
Fangoria Chainsaw Awards	Best Actor	Tom Hiddleston	Runner-up	
Fangoria Chainsaw Awards	Best Supporting Actor	Jim Beaver	Nominated	
Fangoria Chainsaw Awards	Best Supporting Actress	Jessica Chastain	Won	
Fangoria Chainsaw Awards	Best Score	Fernando Velázquez	Runner-up	
Golden Trailer Awards	Best Horror	"House"	Nominated	
Golden Trailer Awards	Best Horror TV Spot	"Blood"	Nominated	
Golden Trailer Awards	Best Motion/Title Graphics	"House"	Nominated	
Saturn Awards	Best Horror Film	Crimson Peak	Won	
Saturn Awards	Best Director	Guillermo del Toro	Nominated	
Saturn Awards	Best Writing	Guillermo del Toro and Matthew Robbins	Nominated	
Saturn Awards	Best Actress	Mia Wasikowska	Nominated	
Saturn Awards	Best Supporting Actress	Jessica Chastain	Won	
Saturn Awards	Best Music	Fernando Velázquez	Nominated	
Saturn Awards	Best Production Design	Thomas E. Sanders	Won	
Saturn Awards	Best Costume Design	Kate Hawley	Nominated	
Saturn Awards	Best Make-up	David Martí, Montse Ribé and Xavi Bastida	Nominated	
