= Layke Anderson =

British film director and former actor

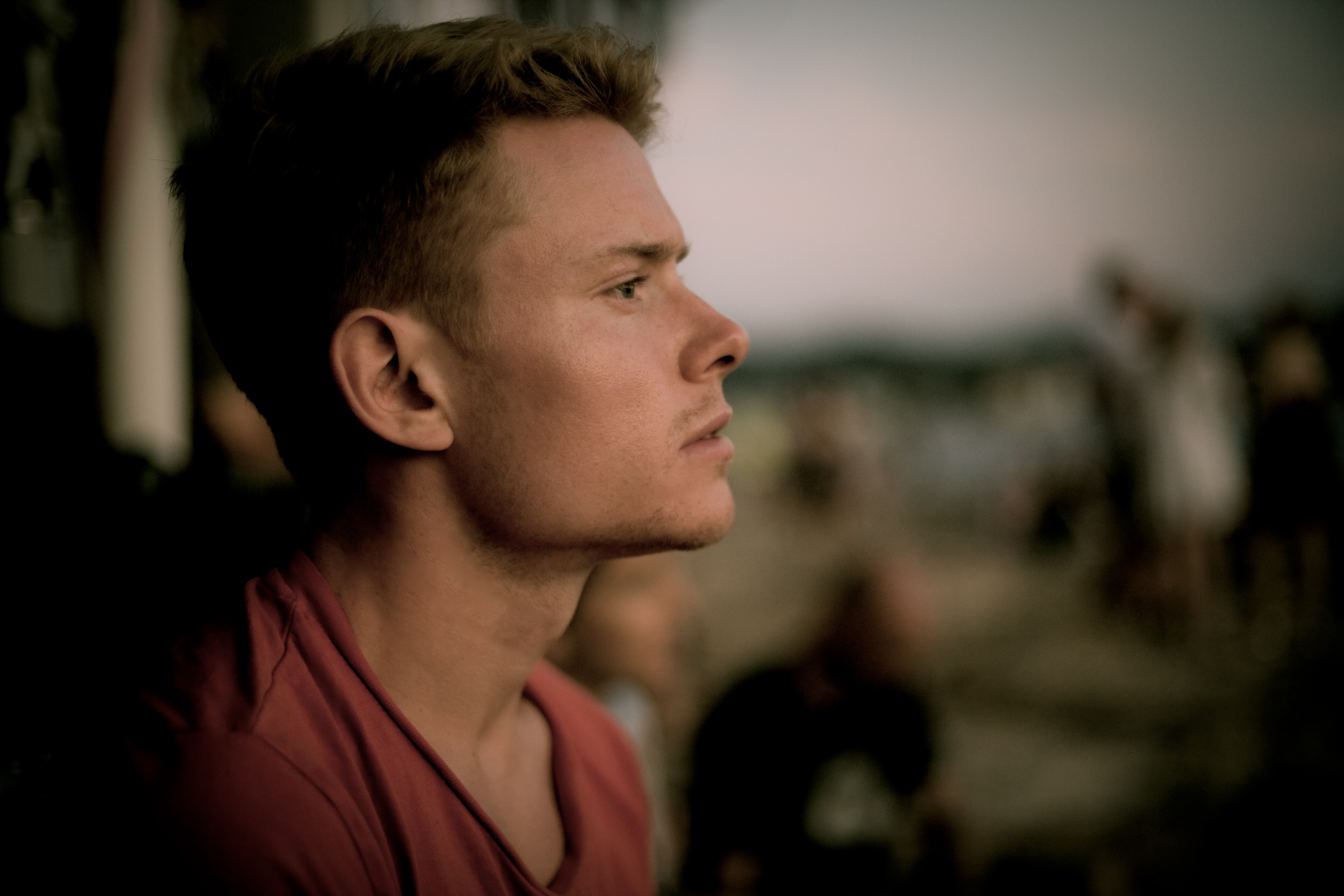
- Anderson in 2015
- Born: Layke Anderson; 10 October 1983 (age 43); London, England
- Years active: 2003–present

Layke Anderson (born 10 October 1983) is a British film director and former actor.

== Career ==
Anderson starred opposite Udo Kier and Stephen Fry in the 2009 Luxembourgian-German drama House of Boys, though left acting behind shortly after to explore working behind the scenes. Other acting credits include Richard Attenborough’s Closing the Ring, action-horror Re-Kill, and Babylon directed by Danny Boyle.

Anderson's directorial debut Dylan's Room, starring Joanna Scanlan, screened at over thirty international film festivals winning multiple awards, and was later nominated for a British Independent Film Award. Dylan's Room was followed by the experimental film Happy Thoughts.

== Filmography ==
Director / Writer / Editor

- 2012: Dylan's Room (short)
- 2014: Happy Thoughts (short)
- 2016: Shopping (short)
- 2017: Epilogue (short)
- 2018: London Unplugged, Directed Shopping segment
- 2019: Mankind (short)

Actor

- 2003: X2 as Cypher (Douglas Aaron Ramsey) (uncredited)
- 2004: Almost Strangers as Heath
- 2006: Communism and Football as Eduard Streltsov
- 2007: Dolphins as Lawrence
- 2007: Popcorn as Cool Guy
- 2007: Closing the Ring as Army Corporal
- 2008: The Chef's Letter as The Young Man
- 2009: House of Boys as Frank
- 2012: The Equestrian as Freddie Forester
- 2013: Babylon
- 2015: Re-Kill as Tom Falkirk

== Awards ==
For Dylan's Room:

- "Best Short Film" Cambridge Film Festival 2012
- "Best Short Drama" Isle of Wight Film Festival 2012
- "Best Drama" Aesthetica Short Film Festival 2012
- "Media Award" Tirana International Film Festival 2012
- "Special Mention" Leeds International Film Festival 2012
- "Highly Commended" Scottish Mental Health Arts and Film Festival 2012
- "Best Drama" The Van d'Or Independent Film Awards 2013

The film was also long-listed for Best UK Short by BAFTA in 2012.

For Happy Thoughts:

- "Online Award" Tirana International Film Festival 2014
- "Palmares Social Action - Experimental & Ficción" International Euro Film Festival 2014
- "Best Editing" Grand OFF World Independent Film Awards 2015

For Shopping:

- "Best Short Film" Ramsgate International Film & TV Festival (UK) 2017
- "Best Short Film" East Coast Film Festival (UK) 2016
- "Special Mention" Anon Film Festival (UK) 2016
