= Villaveza del Agua =

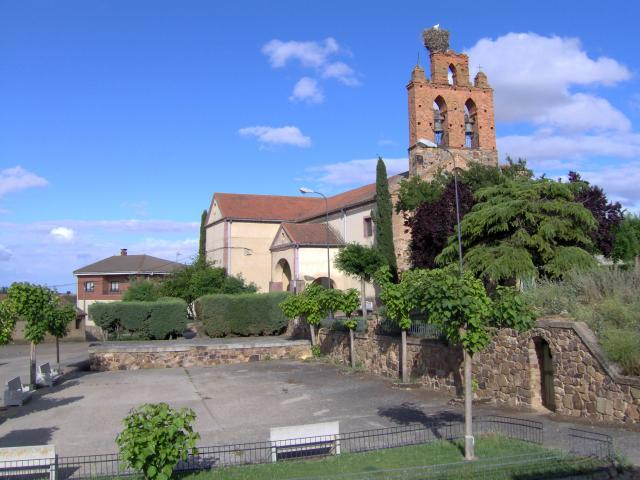
- Villaveza Church

- Location within Spain
- Coordinates: 41°55′N 5°41′W
- Country: Spain
- Autonomous community: Castile and León
- Province: Zamora
- Municipality: Villaveza del Agua

Area
  - Total: 26.26 km^{2} (10.14 sq mi)
- Elevation: 711 m (2,333 ft)

Population (2025-01-01)
  - Total: 162
  - Density: 6.17/km^{2} (16.0/sq mi)
- Time zone: UTC+1 (CET)
  - Summer (DST): UTC+2 (CEST)

Villaveza del Agua is a municipality located in the province of Zamora, Castile and León, Spain. According to the 2004 census (INE), the municipality had a population of 266 inhabitants.
