= Fernando Velázquez (composer) =

Spanish film score composer

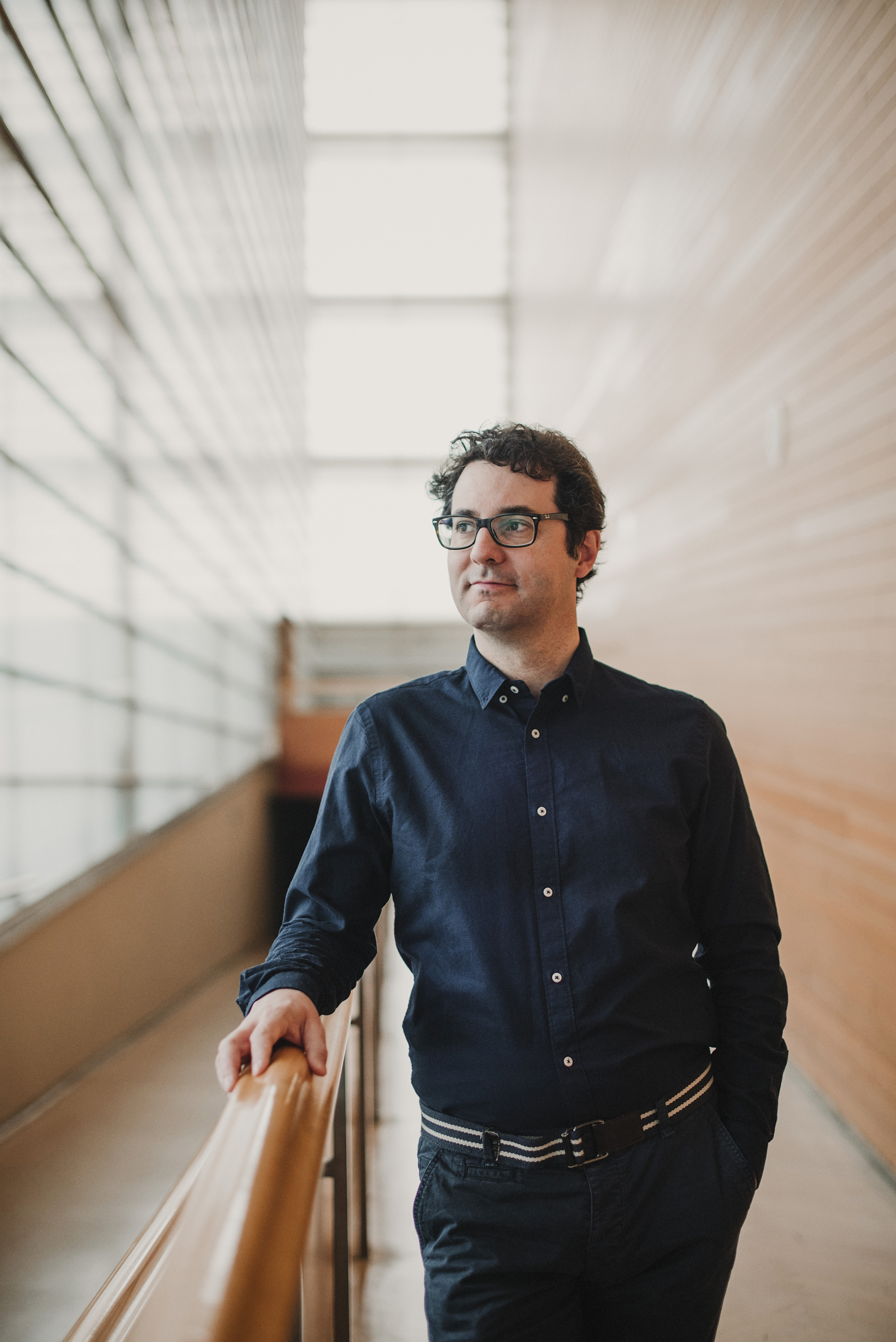
- Born: 22 November 1976 (age 49); Getxo, Biscay, Spain
- Occupations: Composer, Conductor, Cellist,
- Years active: 1995 - present
- Website: https://fernandovelazquez.com/

Fernando Velázquez Saiz (born 22 November 1976) is a Spanish concert, film and TV composer. Among his best known works are the film soundtracks for Juan Antonio Bayona’s films: The Orphanage, The Impossible and A Monster Calls, for which he won the Goya Film Award for Best Original Composition in 2017. He also composed, under the pseudonym Spinny Walder, the music for the spanish movie Campamento Flipy (2010), directed by Flipy.

== Life and career ==
He studied cello at a number of different musical conservatories, including, from 1990 to 1993, Andrés Isasi in Getxo, Juan Crisóstomo Arriaga in Bilbao (1993–1997) and the Conservatory of Music Jesús Guridi in Vitoria, where he won the Excellence Award at the end of his studies. He then travelled to Paris to continue his education. He studied composition at the Royal Conservatory of Madrid from 2003 to 2007, and also holds a degree in Contemporary History from the University of Deusto (1994–1998).

From these studies came a number of opportunities for collaboration including a two year stint as a cellist for the Classical Orchestra of Santa Cecilia (1995–1997), Edinburgh University's Music Society Symphonic Orchestra in 1998, and at the Basque Country's Young Orchestra between 1999 and 2004.

In 1999, Velázquez started his career as a film composer, working with directors such as Koldo Serra for his short film Amor de Madre as well as El Trabajo, by Igor Legarreta and Emilio Pérez Pérez. He continued composing for other short films such as Torre (Óskar Santos, 2000); Hauspo Soinua (Inaz Fernández, 2000); Retruc (Francesc Talavera, 2001); Loops (Tucker Dávila, 2001); Amor, dinero y salud, por este orden (Marc Vigil, 2001); El hombre esponja (J. A. Bayona, 2002); El tren de la bruja (Koldo Serra, 2004); A las 7:35 de la mañana (Nacho Vigalondo, 2004); Temporada baja, (Sergio G. Sánchez, 2003); El soñador (Óskar Santos, 2004); El gran Zambini (Igor Legarreta y Emilio Pérez, 2005) and Dime que yo (Mateo Gil, 2008), which won the Goya Film Award for Best Short Film.

Among his compositions for feature films, which now number more than 50, it is possible to find films such as Agujeros en el cielo (Pedro Santos, 2004); The Birthday (Eugenio Mira, 2004), El síndrome de Svensson (Kepa Sojo, 2006); The Backwoods (Koldo Serra, 2006); Savage Grace (Tom Kalin, 2007); The Orphanage (J.A. Bayona, 2007), the latter film which earned Velázquez a nomination for Best Original Score at the Goya Film Awards of 2008. Additional titles include The Zone (Rodrigo Plá, 2007), Shiver (Isidro Ortiz, 2008); Sexy Killer (Miguel Martí, 2008); Spanish Movie (Javier Ruiz Caldera, 2009); For the Good of Others (Oskar Santos, 2010); Lope (Andrucha Waddington, 2010); Julia's Eyes (Guillem Morales, 2010); Devil (John Dowdle, 2010); Campamento Flipy (2010), 5 metros cuadrados (Max Lemke, 2011); BabyCall (Pål Sletaune, 2011); The Impossible (J.A. Bayona, 2012), which saw him earn his second nomination for Best Original Film Score in the Goya Film Awards of 2013. Mama (Andrés Muschietti, 2013); The Last Days (David Pastor and Álex Pastor, 2013); Zip & Zap and the Marble Gang (Oskar Santos, 2013); The Adventurer: The Curse of the Midas Box (Jonathan Newman, 2013); Spanish Affair (Emilio Martínez-Lázaro, 2014); Hercules (Brett Ratner, 2014); Crimson Peak (Guillermo del Toro, 2015); Pride and Prejudice and Zombies (Burr Steers, 2016); Gernika (Koldo Serra, 2016); Zip & Zap and the Captain's Island (Oskar Santos, 2016). A Monster Calls (J.A. Bayona, 2017) winner of the Goya Film Award for Best Original Score in 2017. The Invisible Guest (Oriol Paulo, 2016); Ozzy (Alberto Rodríguez y Nacho La Casa, 2016); The Invisible Guardian (Fernando González Molina, 2017); Deep (Julio Soto Gurpide, 2017); Submergence (Wim Wenders, 2017); Marrowbone ( Sergio G. Sánchez, 2017); Thi Mai, rumbo a Vietnam (Patricia Ferreira, 2017); Que baje Dios y lo vea (Curro Velázquez, 2017); Las leyes de la termodinámica (Mateo Gil, 2017); Los futbolísimos (Miguel Ángel Lamata, 2017), Superlópez (Javier Ruiz Caldera, 2018), Durante la tormenta (2018), Sergio (2020), Poderoso Victoria (2022) o Los renglones torcidos de Dios (2022).

He has also composed music for Documentaries such Sons of the Clouds (Álvaro Longoria, 2012) and Garbo: The Spy (Edmon Roch, 2009), winner of the Goya Film Award for Best Documentary; and TV series such Karabudjan (2010), Gominolas (2007) and Apaches (2017), Diablero (2018), Patria (2020), El inocente (2021), Alma (2022) and music for theatre: Continuidad de los parques, de Jaime Pujol; Macbeth (Eusebio Poncela y María Ruiz, 2004); He has collaborated with the playwright Alfredo Sanzol since 2008 for theatre productions such as Sí pero no lo soy, Días estupendos, En la Luna, Aventura, La ternura, La respiración, El Gollem, El bar que se tragó a todos los españoles, .... In 2015, he composed music for Hacia la alegría-vers la joie, a theatrical production for the Festival d'Avignon, written by Olivier Py.

He also composes concert pieces such Humanity at music, the Christmas cantata Gabon dut anuntzio and Viento del Oeste for the symphony orchestra, commissioned by the Bilbao Symphony Orchestra. Amongst his upcoming projects are a cello concerto composed for the Navarra Symphony Orchestra and Asier Polo as well as a concerto for two flutes for the Asturias Symphony Orchestra. Some of these compositions has been published on his first concert music album "Viento", published in 2022 by Pentatone.

He has also produced albums and live concerts for artists such as Pasión Vega, Ken Zazpi, Amancio Prada, Raphael, Doctor Deseo, among others.

As conductor he has conducted, among others, The Euskadiko Orkestra, The Community of Madrid Orchestra, The London Philharmonic Orchestra, The RTVE Symphony Orchestra, London Metropolitan Orchestra, Malaga Symphony Orchestra, Budapest Symphony Orchestra, Royal Seville Symphonic Orchestra, Bilbao Symphony Orchestra, Extremadura Symphony Orchestra, Navarra Symphony Orchestra, Czech National Orchestra, Asturias Symphony Orchestra and Galicia Symphony Orchestra. In recent years, he has taken time to record the majority of his productions with State funded Spanish orchestras.

== Awards and nominations ==
In 2008 Velázquez was nominated for Best Original Film Score at the Goya Film Awards for his work in The Orphanage, which awarded him the Cinema Writers Circle Medal and the Musical Award given by the Spanish General Society of Authors and Publishers. In 2012, he was awarded with the Ojo Crítico Award from RTVE in light of his "capacity to compose music specifically created for cinema that has the ability to transcend and reach its own entity". He was again nominated at the Goya Film Awards with The Imposible' (2013) and A Monster Calls (2017). He won the Goya for the latter for Best Original Score and received the Feroz Award and the Cinema Writers Circle Award. Velázquez has also been nominated as the 2016 composer by the International Association of Musical Film Writers.

He is also a member of the America Motion Picture Arts and Sciences

=== World Soundtrack Awards ===
- 2008: The Orphanage (nomination)

=== International Film Music Critics Association Awards ===
- 2007: Best New Composer of the Year (nomination)
- 2007: The Orphanage (nomination, Best Horror/Thriller Score)
- 2009: Garbo: The Spy (nomination, Best Documentary Score)
- 2012: The Impossible (win, Film Music Composition of the Year, for "Main Titles")
- 2012: The Impossible (nomination, Film Score of the Year)
- 2012: Film Composer of the Year (nomination)
- 2012: The Impossible (nomination, Best Drama Score)

=== Barcelona Film Awards ===
- 2007: The Orphanage (nomination)

=== Cinema Writers Circle Awards, Spain ===
- 2011: Lope (nomination)
- 2008: The Orphanage (win)

=== European Film Awards ===
- 2008: The Orphanage (nomination)

=== Goya Awards ===
- 2008: The Orphanage (nomination)
- 2013: The Impossible (nomination)
- 2017: A Monster Calls (win)

=== Feroz Awards ===
- 2017: A Monster Calls (win)

=== Spanish Music Awards ===
- 2008: The Orphanage (win)

== Original Soundtracks ==
=== Films ===
Year	Title	Notes
2026	Deep Water	
2022	Inspector Sun and the course of the black widow	
2022	La contadora de películas	
2022	Mummies	
2022	Los renglones torcidos de Dios	
2022	Poderoso Victoria	
2022	El vasco	
2022	El test	
2020	Campanadas a muerto	
2020	Ofrenda a la tormenta	
2020	La guerra más larga	
2020	Sergio	
2019	El silencio de la ciudad blanca	
2019	Legado en los Huesos	Soundtrack released by Atresmúsica.
2019	Lo nunca visto	
2018	El hijo del acordeonista	
2018	Mirage	Soundtrack released by Atresmúsica.
2018	70 Binladens	Soundtrack released by Quartet Records.
2018	Superlópez	Soundtrack released by Atresmúsica.
2018	Los futbolísimos	Soundtrack released by Atresmúsica.
2018	Sanctuary	Documentary. Soundtrack released by Quartet Records.
2018	The laws of thermodinamics	Soundtrack released by Quartet Records.
2017	Que baje Dios y lo vea	Soundtrack released by Quartet Records.
2017	Thi Mai. Rumbo a Vietnam	Soundtrack released by Quartet Records.
2017	Marrowbone	Soundtrack released by Mira Mi Música.
2017	Submergence	Soundtrack released by Varèse Sarabande Records.
2017	Deep	Soundtrack released by Quartet Records.
2017	The invisible guardian	Soundtrack released by Atresmúsica.
2016	Ozzy	Soundtrack released by Quartet Records.
2016	Contratiempo	Soundtrack released by Sony ATV.
2016	A Monster Calls	Soundtrack released by Back Lot Music.
2016	Zip & Zap and the Captain island	Soundtrack released by Quartet Records.
2016	Gernika	
2016	Pride and Prejudice and Zombies	Soundtrack released by Starr Score Holdings, LLC.
2015	Crimson Peak	Soundtrack released by Quartet Records.
2015	The propaganda game	Documentary.
2015	Colonia	
2014	Out of the dark	
2014	Hercules	Soundtrack released by Sony Classical.
2014	321 Days in Michigan	
2014	Ocho apellidos vascos	
2013	The Adventurer: The Curse of the Midas Box	
2013	Zip & Zap and the Marble Gang	
2013	The last days	
2013	Mama	Soundtrack released by Quartet Records.
2012	Uskyld	
2012	The Impossible	Soundtrack released by Quartet Records.
2012	Sons of the Clouds: The Last Colony	Documentary.
2011	The Monitor	
2011	Cinco metros cuadrados	
2010	Última sesión	
2010	Devil	Soundtrack released by Varèse Sarabande.
2010	Julia's Eyes	
2010	Lope	Soundtrack released by Warner Bros. Records.
2010	Campmento Flipy (film)	under the pseudonym Spinny Walder.
2010	For the Good of Others	
2009	Spanish Movie	
2009	Garbo: The Spy	Documentary, Soundtrack released by MovieScore Media.
2008	Sexykiller	
2008	Shiver	Soundtrack released by MovieScore Media.
2007	The Orphanage	Soundtrack released by Rhino Records.
2007	Savage Grace	
2007	The zone	
2006	El síndrome de Svensson	
2006	The Backwoods	

=== TV Series ===
Año	Película	Notas
2022	Alma	
2021	El inocente	
2020	Patria	
2020	Scott y Milá	
2018-19	La otra mirada	
2018	Diablero	
2015-17	Apaches	
2015	Aitaren etxea	
2013-14	Cuéntame un cuento	
2010	Karabudjan	
2009	Go!azen	
2007	Gominolas	
