= Mercedes Gamero =

Spanish film producer

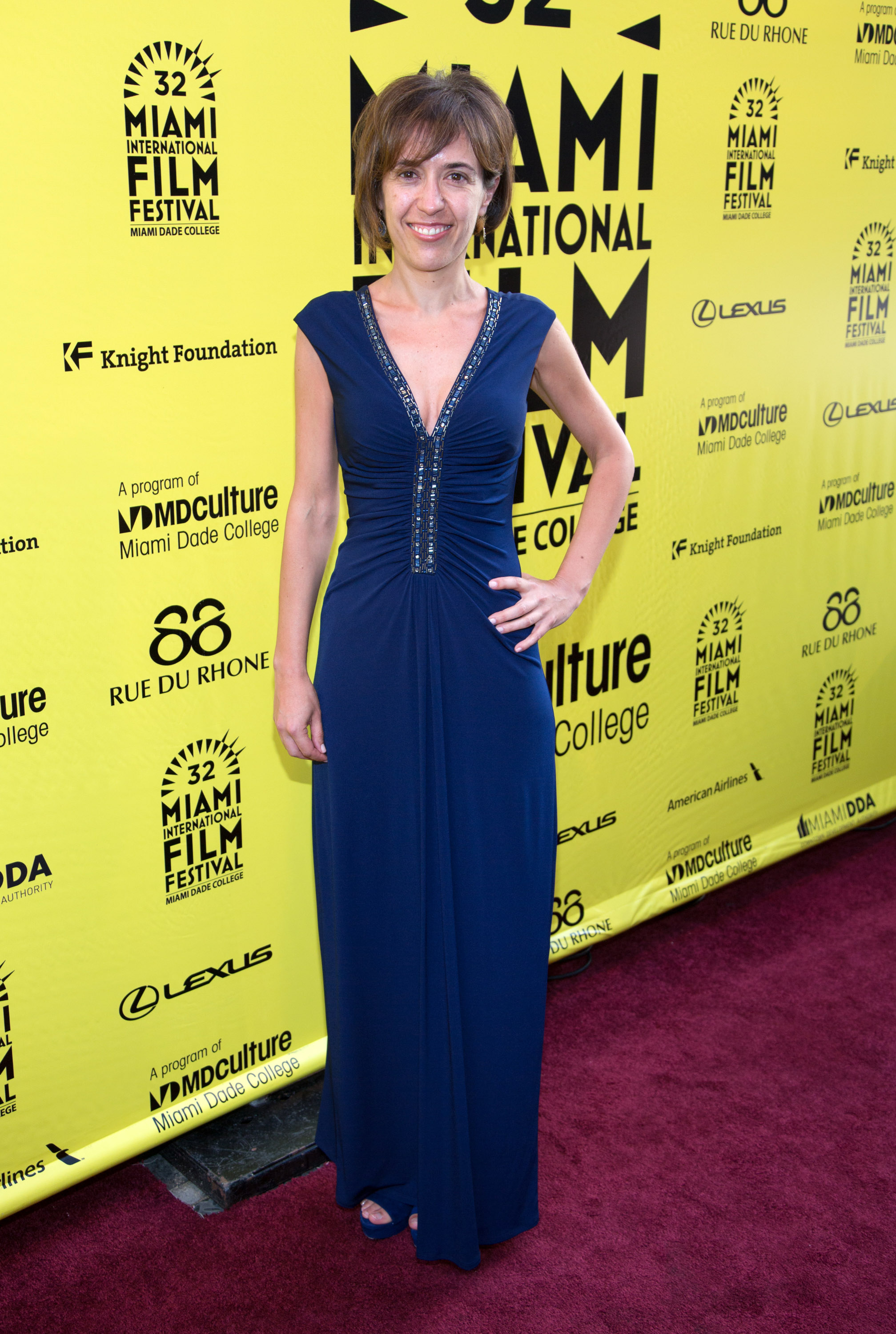
Gamero attending the 2015 Miami International Film Festival

Mercedes Gamero is a Spanish film producer and the head of Beta Fiction Spain since 2022. From 2009 to 2022, she served as general manager of Antena 3 Films/Atresmedia Cine.

== Biography ==
She is from Viladecans, Catalonia and the daughter of actor Antonio Gamero. She earned a licentiate degree in German philology and a master's degree in audivisual production from the Complutense University of Madrid (UCM). Early in her career, she worked for Telemadrid, AXN Canal España, and Sogecable. She joined Grupo Antena 3 (later Atresmedia) in 2004, becoming the CEO of its film production arm Antena 3 Films (later Atresmedia Cine) in 2009. While working for the aforementioned mass media group, she has been responsible for over 150 films, including Palm Trees in the Snow, The Invisible Guardian, Marshland, and The Invisible Guest. In 2022, Gamero left Atresmedia Cine after 18 years employed by Atresmedia, to head the newly created Spanish subsidiary of Beta Fiction.
