= 22nd Actors and Actresses Union Awards =

2013 Spanish award ceremony

- Date: 3 June 2013
- Site: Teatro Coliseum, Madrid, Spain
- Hosted by: Javier Botet, Raúl Jiménez, Ignatius Farray, David Pareja
- Organized by: Actors and Actresses Union

Highlights
- Honorary career award: Julieta Serrano

The 22nd Actors and Actresses Union Awards ceremony was held on 3 June 2013 at the Teatro Coliseum in Madrid. The gala was directed by Juan Cavestany and hosted by Javier Botet, Raúl Jiménez, Ignatius Farray and David Pareja.

In addition to the competitive awards Ada Colau received the 'Mujeres en Unión' award, Julieta Serrano the 'Toda una vida' career award and Antonio Malonda the Special Award.

== Winners and nominees ==
The winners and nominees are listed as follows:

=== Film ===
Best Male Performance in a Leading Role: Antonio de la Torre — Unit 7; Daniel Giménez-Cacho — Snow White; Luis Tosar — Operation E	Best Female Performance in a Leading Role: Maribel Verdú — Snow White; Aida Folch — The Artist and the Model; Sonia Almarcha — Orson West
Best Male Performance in a Secondary Role: Julián Villagrán — Unit 7; Eduard Fernández — A Gun in Each Hand; Víctor Clavijo — Holmes & Watson. Madrid Days	Best Female Performance in a Secondary Role: Candela Peña — A Gun in Each Hand; Ángela Molina — Snow White; Chus Lampreave — The Artist and the Model
Best Male Performance in a Minor Role: Alfonso Sánchez — Unit 7; Pere Ponce — Snow White; Ramón Barea — Snow White	Best Female Performance in a Minor Role: Amparo Baró — Maktub; Inma Cuesta — Snow White; Goya Toledo — Maktub

=== Television ===
Best Male Performance in a Leading Role: Roberto Enríquez — Hispania, la leyenda; Ginés García Millán — Isabel; Pablo Derqui — Isabel	Best Female Performance in a Leading Role: Adriana Ozores — Gran Hotel; Itziar Miranda — Amar en tiempos revueltos; Michelle Jenner — Isabel
Best Male Performance in a Secondary Role: Pedro Casablanc — Isabel; Juan Gea — Amar en tiempos revueltos; Sergio Peris-Mencheta — Isabel	Best Female Performance in a Secondary Role: Concha Velasco — Gran Hotel; Bárbara Lennie — Isabel; Luz Valdenebro — Gran Hotel
Best Male Performance in a Minor Role: Joaquín Climent — Amar en tiempos revueltos; Canco Rodríguez — Aída; Paco Manzanedo — La fuga	Best Female Performance in a Minor Role: Mariví Bilbao — La que se avecina; Clara Sanchís — Isabel; Luisa Martín — Frágiles

=== Theatre ===
Best Male Performance in a Leading Role: Carlos Hipólito — Follies; Alberto San Juan — Hamlet; Juan Diego Botto — Un trozo invisible de este mundo	Best Female Performance in a Leading Role: Blanca Portillo — Life Is a Dream; Amparo Baró — Agosto; Vicky Peña — El diccionario
Best Male Performance in a Secondary Role: Alberto Berzal — Los últimos días de Judas Iscariote; Germán Torres — Iván-Off; Alberto Amarilla — Lúcido	Best Female Performance in a Secondary Role: Malena Alterio — Los hijos se han dormido; Marta Poveda — Life Is a Dream; Inma Cuevas — Los últimos días de Judas Iscariote
Best Male Performance in a Minor Role: Alberto Iglesias — Of Mice and Men; Ángel Ruiz — Follies; Israel Frías — Los últimos días de Judas Iscariote	Best Female Performance in a Minor Role: Asunción Balaguer — Follies; Ana Villa — Hamlet; Rocío Calvo — Ivan-Off

=== Newcomers ===
Best New Actor: Álex García — Entre esquelas; Andoni Hernández — Maktub}; Fran Nortes — Frágiles	Best New Actress: Elena Rayos — Farsas y églogas; Aránzazu Garrástazul — 12+1, una comedia metafísica; Carmina Barrios — Carmina or Blow Up
