= 5th Gaudí Awards =

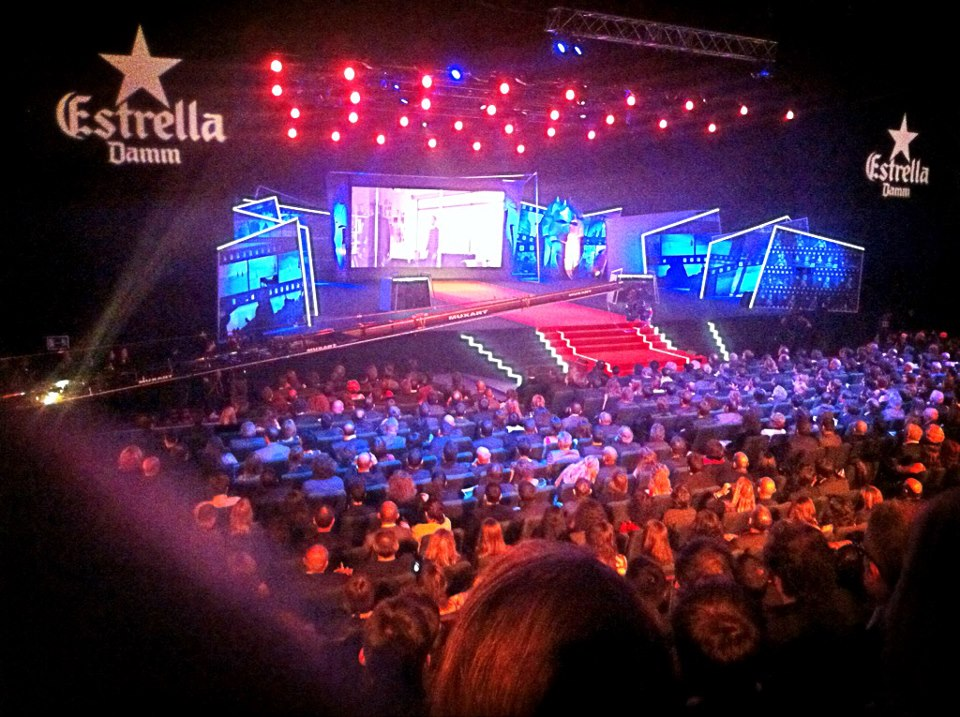
- Date: 3 February 2013
- Site: Barcelona Teatre Musical, Barcelona, Spain
- Hosted by: Andreu Buenafuente
- Organized by: Catalan Film Academy

Highlights
- Most awards: The Impossible (6)
- Most nominations: Snow White (12)

Television coverage
- Network: TV3
- Viewership: 0.51 million (17.4%)

The 5th Gaudí Awards ceremony, presented by the Catalan Film Academy, was held at the Barcelona Teatre Musical in Barcelona on 3 February 2013. The gala was hosted by Andreu Buenafuente.

== Background ==
The nominations were read by Santi Millán and Leticia Dolera from La Pedrera on 7 January 2013. The awards ceremony took place on 3 February 2013 at the Barcelona Teatre Musical (BTM) and it was hosted by Andreu Buenafuente.

The linear television broadcast on TV3 commanded 506,000 viewers (17.4% audience share).

== Winners and nominees ==
The winners and nominees are listed as follows:

Best Film: Snow White; The Forest; The Wild Ones; Fènix 11·23	Bet Non-Catalan Language Film: A Gun in Each Hand; Rec 3: Genesis; Red Lights; Winning Streak
Best Director: Juan Antonio Bayona — The Impossible; Pablo Berger — Snow White; Cesc Gay — A Gun in Each Hand; Joel Joan, Sergi Lara — Fènix 11·23	Best Screenplay: Tomàs Aragay, Cesc Gay — A Gun in Each Hand; Pablo Berger — Snow White; Patricia Ferreira, Virginia Yagüe — The Wild Ones; Albert Sánchez Piñol — The Forest
Best Actress: María Molins — The Forest; Marina Comas — The Wild Ones; Ángela Molina — Snow White; Maribel Verdú — Snow White	Best Actor: Àlex Monner — The Wild Ones; Àlex Brendemühl — The Forest; Nil Cardoner — Fènix 11·23; Àlex Casanovas — Fènix 11·23
Best Supporting Actress: Candela Peña — A Gun in Each Hand; Aina Clotet — The Wild Ones; Clara Segura — The Wild Ones; Ana Wagener — Fènix 11·23	Best Supporting Actor: Eduard Fernández — A Gun in Each Hand; Francesc Orella — The Wild Ones; Pere Ponce — The Forest; Lluís Villanueva — Fènix 11·23
Best Production Supervision: Eduard Vallès — Winning Streak; Josep Amorós — I Want You; Ander Sistiaga — The Forest; Anna Vilella — Fènix 11·23	Best Documentary Film (Note: Pepe & Rubianes was originally entered as one of the four nominations in the category, but it was removed on the initiative of the film's producers, and its vacant was covered by Volar.): Jordi Dauder, la revolució pendent; Al fossat; Hollywood Talkies; Volar
Best European Film: The Impossible; In the House; Le Havre; The Intouchables	Best Short Film: Luisa no está en casa; Cartas desde la locura; Coup de grâce; Elefante
Best Television Film: Tornarem; Atrapats; Germanes; Mar de plàstic	Best Art Direction: Alain Bainée — Snow White; Gemma Fauria — Rec 3: Genesis; Balter Gallart — Winning Streak; Irene Montcada — The Forest
Best Editing: Elena Ruiz, Bernat Vilaplana — The Impossible; Fernando Franco — Snow White; David Gallart — Rec 3: Genesis; Bernat Vilaplana — The Forest	Best Cinematography: Óscar Faura — The Impossible; Kiko de la Rica — Snow White; Sergi Gallardo — The Wild Ones; David Omedes — Winning Streak
Best Original Music: Alfonso de Vilallonga — Snow White; Lluís Llach — Jordi Dauder, la revolució pendent; Zacarías M. de la Riva — Tad, the Lost Explorer; Marc Vaillo — Orson West	Best Costume Design: Paco Delgado — Snow White; Elena Ballester — Any de gràcia; María Gil, Sonia Segura — The Forest; Anna Güell — A Gun in Each Hand
Best Sound: Oriol Tarragó, Marc Orts — The Impossible; Carlos Faruolo, Kiku Vidal, Jaime Fernández — Tad, the Lost Explorer; Xavi Mas, Gabriel Gutiérrez, Marc Orts — Rec 3: Genesis; Albert Manera, James Muñoz, José A. Manovel — Red Lights	Best Makeup and Hairstyles: David Martí, Montse Ribé — The Impossible; David Ambit, Patricia Reyes — Rec 3: Genesis; Fermín Galán, Sylvie Imbert — Snow White; Saturnino Merino, Alma Casal — The Forest
Best Digital/Special Effects: José María Aragonés — Tad, The Lost Explorer; Reyes Abades, Ferran Piquer — Snow White; David Ambit, Patricia Reyes, Àlex Villagrasa — Rec 3: Genesis; Cesc Biénzobas, Joan Amer — The Forest	Best Animated Film: Tad, The Lost Explorer; Pet Pals: Marco Polo's Code; Daddy, I'm a Zombie

=== Films with multiple nominations and awards ===
Films with multiple nominations
Nominations	Film
12	Snow White
11	The Forest
8	The Wild Ones
7	Fènix 11·23
6	A Gun in Each Hand
6	The Impossible
6	Rec 3: Genesis
4	Winning Streak
4	Tad, The Lost Explorer
2	Red Lights
2	Jordi Dauder, la revolució pendent

Films with multiple awards
Awards	Film
6	The Impossible
4	Snow White
4	A Gun in Each Hand
2	Tad, The Lost Explorer

== Honorary Award ==
Actress Montserrat Carulla was the recipient of the Gaudí honorary award.
