= Manolo Solo =

Spanish actor (1964–2026)

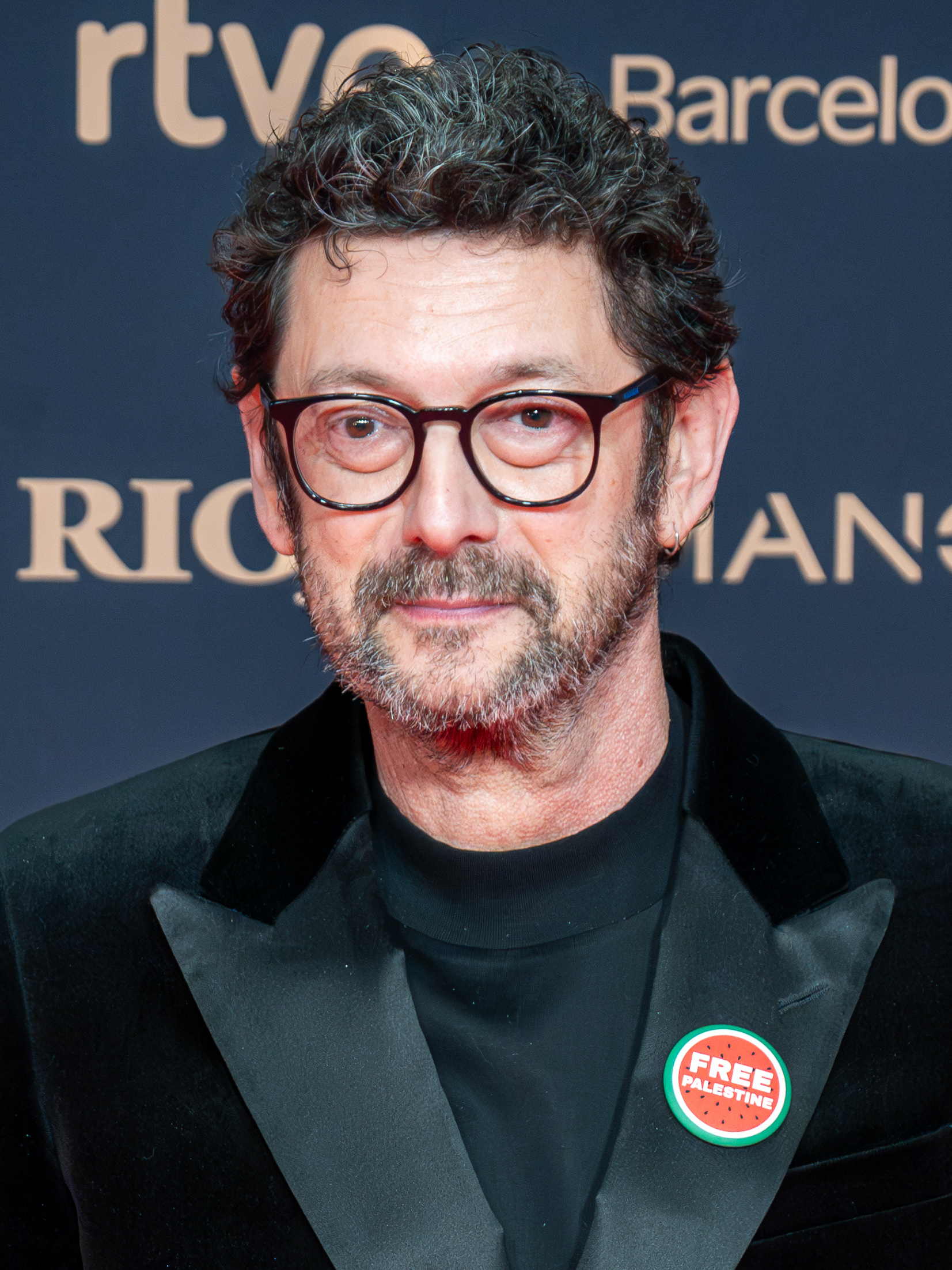
- Solo in 2026
- Born: Manuel Jesús Fernández Serrano; 11 January 1964; Algeciras, Spain
- Died: 30 July 2026 (aged 62); Madrid, Spain
- Education: University of Seville
- Occupation: Actor

Manuel Jesús Fernández Serrano (11 January 1964 – 30 July 2026), better known as Manolo Solo, was a Spanish actor.

Solo started off as a musician in the Sevillian rock scene, and later turned to acting. He achieved a late recognition as a leading actor after persevering in many middle and minor roles in tens of features, shorts and series, including his portrayals of Judge Ruz in B, la película (2015) and a small-time dealer in The Fury of a Patient Man (2016), for which he won the Goya Award for Best Supporting Actor. After his performance in Close Your Eyes (2023) he landed other leading roles in his final years in The Portuguese House (2025) and Nothing Personal (2025). His television work includes performances in 30 Coins, Celeste, and The Anatomy of a Moment.

He was the recipient of multiple accolades, including a Goya Award and four Actors and Actresses Union Awards.

== Early life and education ==
Manuel Jesús Fernández Serrano was born in Algeciras on 11 January 1964. His parents were teachers. His father died when he was a toddler. He was raised in neighbouring Los Barrios until age 6, later moving to Seville with his family. The missing of his father influenced on the choices of the stage name Manolo Solo ('alone') when he started a musical career when he was 16–17 and on his university degree, even if he never worked as a teacher.

Part of the Sevillian musical scene in his youth, he was bassist-singer of Hacienda Somos Todos and Libertad Provisional. He later joined Arden Lágrimas and became the vocalist of rock band Los Relicarios, sharing stage with Santi Amodeo. In 1991, Los Relicarios released the album Detentebala.

Solo earned a licentiate degree in Education Sciences from the University of Seville and trained his acting chops at the Seville's Instituto de Teatro.

== Acting career ==
After debuting as a stage actor in 1989 and making a number of television appearances, he landed his feature film debut in the drama Everything in Place, released in 2002.

In addition to screen performances, he also worked as a dubbing actor in Dragon Ball, providing the voices for characters such as Tao Pai Pai, Mr. Popo, Android 17, and Beerus.

He appeared as the subordinate of the cruel Captain Vidal in Pan's Labyrinth (2006).

In 2011, he appeared in 17 Hours, a film about the 1981 coup attempt in Spain, portraying Fernando Castedo the then director of Radiotelevisión Española.

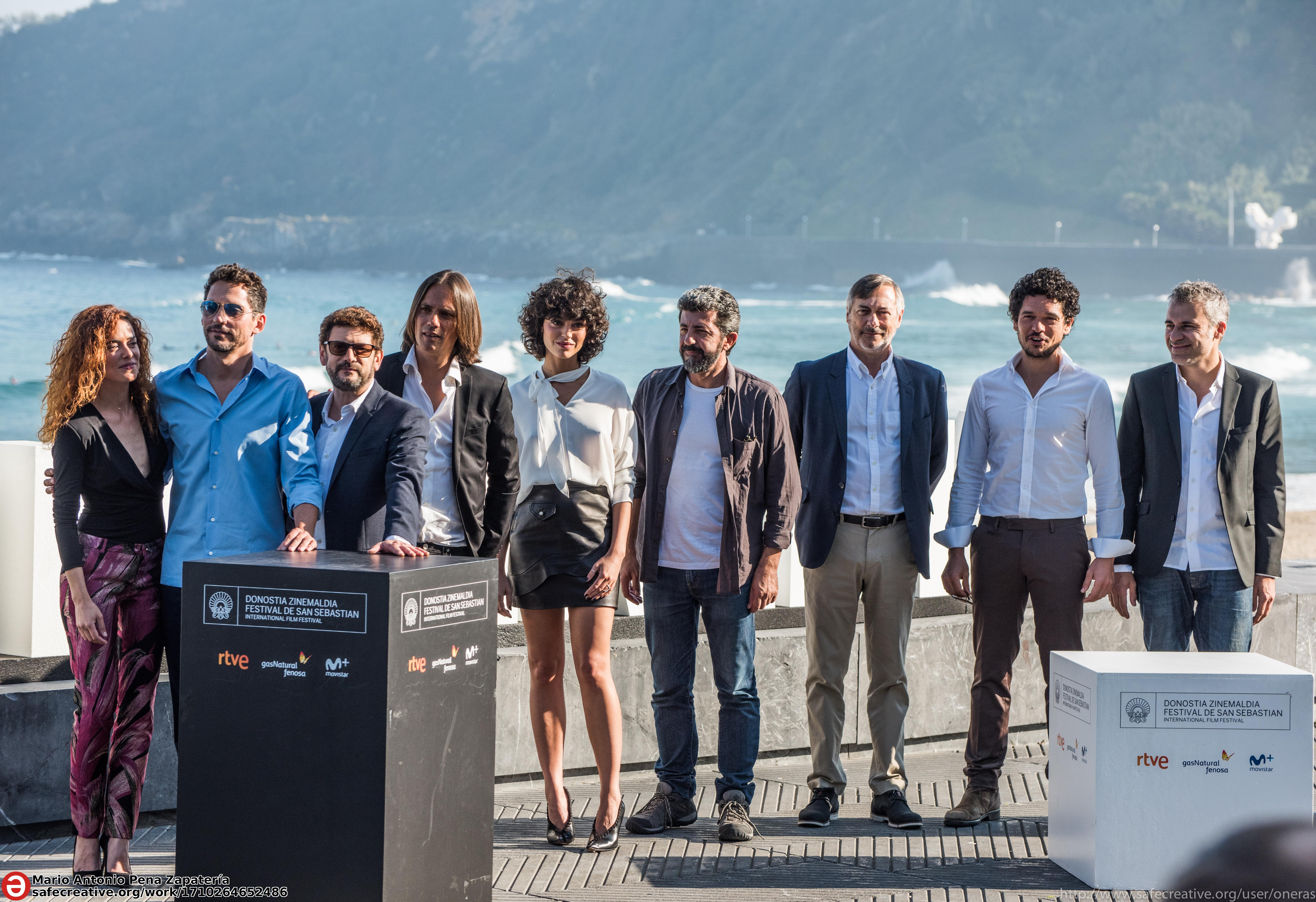
Solo (third from the left) in a group picture during the presentation of The Plague at the 2017 San Sebastián International Film Festival.

Under the direction of fellow Andalusian Alberto Rodríguez, he appeared in supporting roles as a director of a youth detention center in 7 Virgins (2005), as a journalist for El Caso during the Transition in the thriller film Marshland (2014) and as inquisitor general Celso de Guevara in the 16th century-set series The Plague.

In the legal drama B (2015), Solo portrayed Pablo Ruz, the judge of Spain's Audiencia Nacional who presided over the Gürtel case and the Bárcenas case, opposite to Pedro Casablanc (Luis Bárcenas).

His only Goya Award came for his supporting performance as El Triana, a small-time dealer, in The Fury of a Patient Man (2016). He employed a dysphonic voice he improvised during one of the first readings of his lines that the director Raúl Arévalo liked so much that he was asked to keep it.

Solo featured in the play Smoking Room, a stage adaptation of the 2002 film by Roger Gual and Julio D. Wallovits. It debuted at the Teatro Pavón Kamikaze on 12 October 2017 and won Solo the Actors and Actresses Union Award for Best Theatre Actor in a Secondary Role. Solo's career onstage continued with his participation in Mrs. Dalloway, based on the novel by Virginia Woolf, portraying Peter. It debuted at the Teatro Español on 28 March 2019.

For his role in the comedy film The Good Boss (2021) as Miralles, the right hand of businessman Julio Blanco (played by Javier Bardem) and working as a sort of conscience for the latter, he landed another nomination for the Goya Award for Best Supporting Actor.

Víctor Erice's Close Your Eyes (2023) earned him recognition as a leading actor. His role was that of film director Miguel Garay (described as an "obvious Erice stand-in"), so shaken by the missing of a friend that he quit filmmaking. Critic Glenn Kenny observed that, in the film, his "deep-set eyes convey universes of worry and sadness". The performance landed him his first nomination for the Goya Award for Best Actor.

In 2025, he collaborated again with Alberto Rodríguez in the miniseries The Anatomy of a Moment (another exploration of the February 1981 coup attempt), portraying General Gutiérrez Mellado. According to Solo, the greatest challenge he faced in order to play the role was understanding Gutiérrez Mellado's complex evolution "from being someone who helped carry out the coup d'état in '36 to becoming someone who tries to stop another coup 40 or 50 years later".

He starred in the drama film Nothing Personal (2025) opposite Sonia Almarcha as an embittered online hater who meets in person the celebrity television host he abuses online. He describe his character as "a person who deeply despises himself and is in a process of regression".

Solo died in Madrid on 30 July 2026, at the age of 62, after a prolonged illness caused by cancer. He was shooting Las vecinas. His wake was held at the funeral home of San Isidro in Madrid and was attended by colleagues such as Raúl Arévalo, Melina Matthews, Malena Alterio, Álex de la Iglesia, and Carolina Bang.

== Selected filmography ==
=== Film ===
Year	Title	Role	Notes	Ref.
2002	Cuando todo esté en orden (Everything in Place)	Juan		
2003	Astronautas (Astronauts)	Lorenzo		
2003	La flaqueza del bolchevique (The Weakness of the Bolshevik)	Francisco		
2006	El laberinto del fauno (Pan's Labyrinth)	Garcés		
2007	Lola, la película (Lola, the Movie)	Joaquín Romero		
2007	Pudor (Modesty)	Hombre X		
2009	Celda 211 (Cell 211)	José María Roca		
2009	El cónsul de Sodoma (The Consul of Sodom)	Meler		
2010	El gran Vázquez (The Great Vazquez)	Ibáñez		
2010	Amador			
2011	La cebra	"The one-eyed"		
2011	23-F: La película (17 Hours)	Fernando Castedo		
2011	Verbo	Professor		
2012	Impávido (Poker Face)	Tena		
2013	La herida (Wounded)	Jaime		
2014	La isla mínima (Marshland)	Periodista		
2015	B, la película	Juez Ruz ('Judge Ruz')		
2016	Tarde para la ira (The Fury of a Patient Man)	El Triana		
2016	Los del túnel (The Tunnel Gang)	José Manuel		
2017	Es por tu bien (It's for Your Own Good)	Juan		
2019	El silencio de la ciudad blanca (Twin Murders: The Silence of the White City)	Mario Santos		
2021	Competencia oficial (Official Competition)	Matías		
2021	Josefina (Josephine)	Rafael		
2021	Sevillanas de Brooklyn (When Brooklyn Met Seville)	Antonio		
2021	El buen patrón (The Good Boss)	Miralles		
2022	Girasoles silvestres (Wild Flowers)	Roberto		
2022	La fortaleza (The Fortress)	Amigo de Jorge ('Jorge's friend')		
2023	La desconocida (Girl Unknown)	Leo		
2023	Cerrar los ojos (Close Your Eyes)	Miguel Garay		
2023	El hombre del saco (The Boogeyman: The Origin of the Myth)	Quino Aguirre		
2025	El cielo de los animales (The Heaven of Animals)	Benicio		
2025	Una quinta portuguesa (The Portuguese House)	Fernando / Manuel		
2025	A la cara (Nothing Personal)	Pedro	reprise of short film role	
2026	Aquí	Simón		
2026	La desconocida (The Marked Woman)	Leo Falcó		

=== Television ===
Year	Title	Role	Notes	Ref.
2014	Prim, el asesinato de la calle del Turco	Nandín	TV movie	
2018-19	La peste (The Plague)	Celso de Guevara		
2020-23	30 monedas (30 Coins)	Cardenal Fabio Santoro	Primarily Italian-speaking performance	
2024	Celeste	Toni		
2025	Anatomía de un instante (The Anatomy of a Moment)	Manuel Gutiérrez Mellado		

== Accolades ==
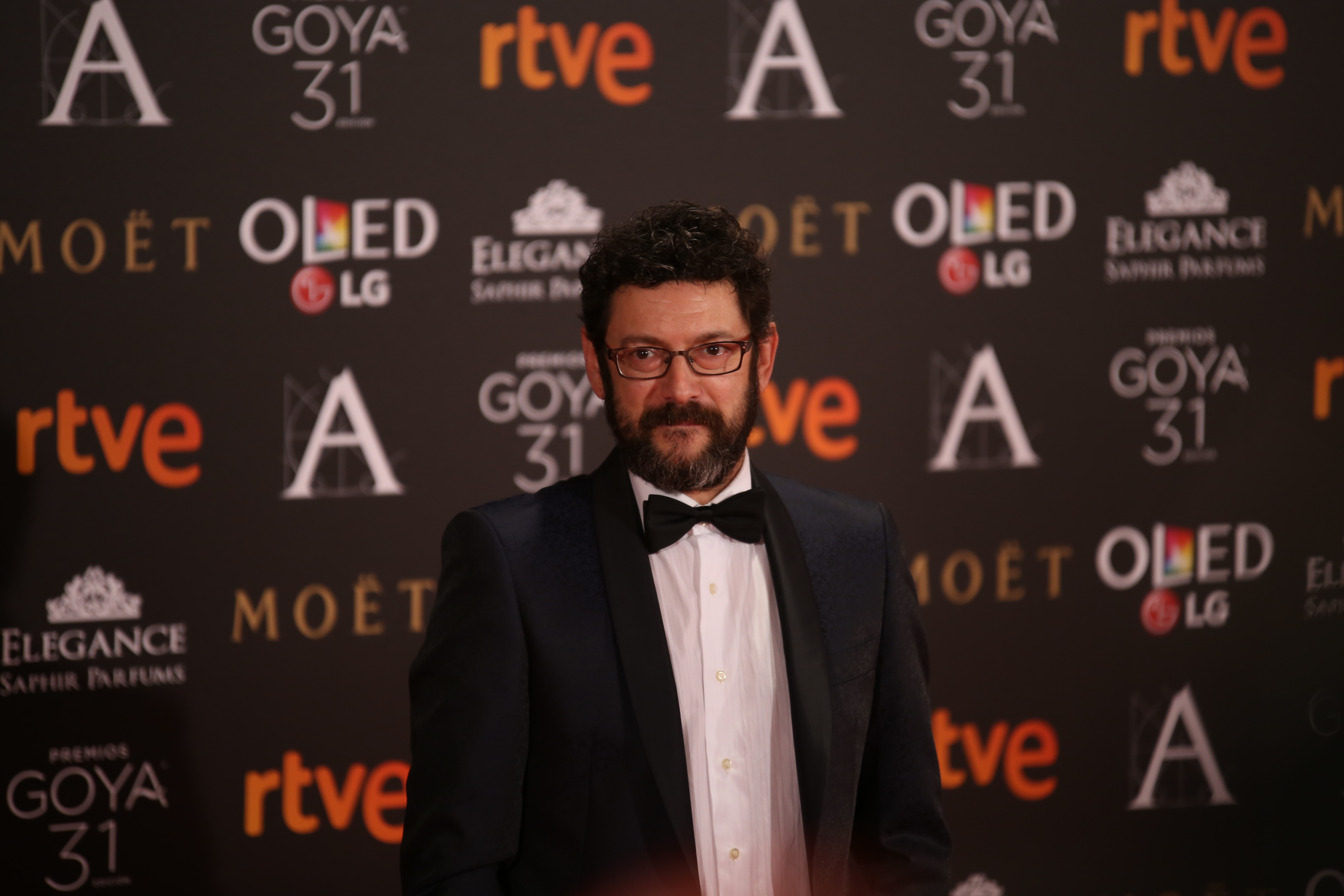
Solo attending the 31st Goya Awards gala in which he won Best Supporting Actor for The Fury of a Patient Man

Year	Award	Category	Work	Result	Ref.
2015	24th Actors and Actresses Union Awards	Best Film Actor in a Minor Role	Marshland	Won	
2016	71st CEC Medals	Best Supporting Actor	B, the Movie	Nominated	
2016	30th Goya Awards	Best Supporting Actor	B, the Movie	Nominated	
2016	25th Actors and Actresses Union Awards	Best Film Actor in a Minor Role	B, the Movie	Won	
2017	4th Feroz Awards	Best Supporting Actor in a Film	The Fury of a Patient Man	Won	
2017	72nd CEC Medals	Best Supporting Actor	The Fury of a Patient Man	Won	
2017	31st Goya Awards	Best Supporting Actor	The Fury of a Patient Man	Won	
2017	26th Actors and Actresses Union Awards	Best Film Actor in a Minor Role	The Fury of a Patient Man	Won	
2018	27th Actors and Actresses Union Awards	Best Theatre Actor in a Secondary Role	Smoking Room	Won	
2019	6th Feroz Awards	Best Supporting Actor in a Series	The Plague	Nominated	
2021	8th Feroz Awards	Best Supporting Actor in a Series	30 Coins	Nominated	
2022	9th Feroz Awards	Best Supporting Actor in a Film	The Good Boss	Nominated	
2022	1st Carmen Awards	Best Supporting Actor	The Good Boss	Won	
2022	1st Carmen Awards	Best Supporting Actor	When Brooklyn Met Seville	Nominated	
2022	77th CEC Medals	Best Supporting Actor	The Good Boss	Nominated	
2022	36th Goya Awards	Best Supporting Actor	The Good Boss	Nominated	
2022	30th Actors and Actresses Union Awards	Best Film Actor in a Secondary Role	The Good Boss	Nominated	
2022	9th Platino Awards	Best Supporting Actor	The Good Boss	Nominated	
2023	78th CEC Medals	Best Supporting Actor	Wild Flowers	Nominated	
2023	31st Actors and Actresses Union Awards	Best Film Actor in a Minor Role	Wild Flowers	Nominated	
2023	29th Forqué Awards	Best Actor in a Film	Close Your Eyes	Nominated	
2024	11th Feroz Awards	Best Actor in a Film	Close Your Eyes	Nominated	
2024	3rd Carmen Awards	Best Actor	Close Your Eyes	Nominated	
2024	79th CEC Medals	Best Actor	Close Your Eyes	Nominated	
2024	38th Goya Awards	Best Actor	Close Your Eyes	Nominated	
2024	21st International Cinephile Society Awards	Best Actor	Close Your Eyes	Runner-up	
2024	32nd Actors and Actresses Union Awards	Best Film Actor in a Leading Role	Close Your Eyes	Nominated	
2024	11th Platino Awards	Best Supporting Actor in a Miniseries or TV series	30 Coins	Nominated	
2025	12th Feroz Awards	Best Supporting Actor in a Series	Celeste	Nominated	
2025	8th Lola Gaos Awards	Best Actor	The Portuguese House	Won	
2026	13th Feroz Awards	Best Supporting Actor in a Series	The Anatomy of a Moment	Nominated	
2026	5th Carmen Awards	Best Actor	The Portuguese House	Nominated	
2026	18th Gaudí Awards	Best Actor	The Portuguese House	Nominated	
2026	81st CEC Medals	Best Actor	The Portuguese House	Won	
2026	40th Goya Awards	Best Actor	The Portuguese House	Nominated	
2026	32nd Forqué Awards	Best Actor in a Series	Celeste	Pending	
