= Roberto García Ruiz =

Spanish actor

- Born: 5 March 1974 (age 52); Cantabria, Spain
- Occupation: Actor
- Years active: 1999-present

Roberto García Ruiz (born 5 March 1974) is a Spanish actor best known for the role of Oslo in Money Heist.

García Ruiz is a former bodybuilder.

== Selected filmography ==
- 2017-2020 : Money Heist (La Casa de Papel) (TV Series) : Dimitri Mostóvoi / Radko « Oslo » Dragić
- 2022 : In From the Cold (TV Series) : Tiago Vento
- 2022 : Sayen by Alexander Witt
