= The Fortress (2022 film) =

- Theatrical release poster
- Spanish: La fortaleza
- Directed by: Chiqui Carabante
- Screenplay by: Chiqui Carabante; Salvador S. Molina; David Orea
- Starring: Fernando Cayo; Goya Toledo; José Manuel Poga; Fernando Tejero; Vito Sanz; Carla Nieto; Lola Casamayor; Manuel Zarzo
- Cinematography: Juan Hernández
- Edited by: Cristina Laguna
- Music by: Dario Valderrama
- Production companies: Lolita Films; Womack Studios; Featurent; Un Fin De Semana Juntos AIE
- Distributed by: Syldavia Cinema
- Release dates: 5 November 2022 (Seville); 23 June 2023 (Spain)
- Country: Spain
- Language: Spanish

The Fortress (Spanish: La fortaleza) is a 2022 Spanish black comedy thriller film directed by Chiqui Carabante which stars Fernando Cayo, Goya Toledo, José Manuel Poga, Fernando Tejero, Vito Sanz, Carla Nieto, and Lola Casamayor.

== Plot ==
Upon the death of their father Arturo Viaplana, the Viaplana siblings (Arturo, Mónica, Jorge, Eduardo, and Paula) meet at the reading of the testament to find out about the recipient of the hefty inheritance, only to find out that their deceased father has set a macabre game.

== Cast ==
- Fernando Cayo as Arturo
- Goya Toledo as Mónica
- José Manuel Poga as Jorge
- Carla Nieto as Paula
- Vito Sanz as Eduardo
- Fernando Tejero as notario ('notary')
- Lola Casamayor as Gertrudis
- Manuel Zarzo as Arturo padre
- Nacho Fresneda as marido de Mónica ('Mónica's husband')
- Manolo Solo as amigo de Jorge ('Jorge's friend')

== Production ==
The film is a Lolita Films, Womack Studios, Featurent and Un Fin De Semana Juntos AIE production. Produced in association with Glow, it also has the participation of Canal Sur Radio y Televisión and Canal Extremadura and backing and sponsoring from ICAA, Ayuntamiento de Madrid, Crea SGR, Diputación de Badajoz and Ayuntamiento de Almendralejo. Shooting locations in the province of Badajoz (Extremadura) included Mérida, Almendralejo, and Palomas.

== Release ==
The film had its world premiere at the 19th Seville European Film Festival in November 2022. Distributed by Syldavia Cinema, the film was released theatrically in Spain on 23 June 2023.

== Reception ==
Sergio F. Pinilla of Cinemanía rated the "grotesque, macabre, and even a little bit coarse" film 3 out of 5 stars, underscoring it to be "a vernacular whodunit with more Glass Onion than Buñuel and Berlanga".

Raquel Hernández Luján of HobbyConsolas rated the film with 60 points ('acceptable'), pointing out that the efficiency of its best assets (the black humour and the broadsides) wanes as the film progressively deflates.

== See also ==
- List of Spanish films of 2023
