= Winning Streak (film) =

- Theatrical release poster
- Spanish: The Pelayos
- Directed by: Eduard Cortés
- Written by: Eduard Cortés; Piti Español
- Produced by: Daniel Hernández; Loris Omedes
- Starring: Daniel Brühl; Lluís Homar; Miguel Ángel Silvestre; Eduard Fernández; Blanca Suárez
- Cinematography: David Omedes
- Edited by: Koldo Idígoras
- Music by: Micka Luna
- Production companies: Alea Docs & Films; Bausan Films
- Distributed by: Sony Pictures Releasing de España
- Release dates: 21 April 2012 (Málaga); 27 April 2012 (Spain)
- Running time: 100 minutes
- Country: Spain
- Languages: Spanish; French; Mandarin
- Box office: $1,969,150 (Spain)

Winning Streak (Spanish: The Pelayos) is a 2012 Spanish comedy-drama film co-written and directed by Eduard Cortés. It stars an ensemble cast that includes Daniel Brühl, Lluís Homar, Miguel Ángel Silvestre, Eduard Fernández and Blanca Suárez. It is based on the exploits of the García-Pelayo family. The film premiered on 21 April 2012 at the 15th Málaga Film Festival.

== Background ==
The film is based on the life story and multifaceted personality of Gonzalo García-Pelayo Segovia, a Spanish citizen who had a diverse career as a film director, TV host, music producer, professional gambler, games expert, sponsor for professional poker players and creator of the online CRYPT-FIAT platform Mind.Capital, dedicated to buying and selling in the cryptocurrency exchange market.

Pelayo's great leap to fame came when he developed a legal statistics-and-betting system that allowed him to win more than €1.2 million in the game of roulette, in the early 1990s, with the help of his family. García-Pelayo is currently remembered throughout the world for having made "jump the bank" in different world casinos with the mentioned system. During the 1990s, "the Pelayos" were the public enemy of different casinos inside and outside Europe. His formula led them to earn as much as 13 million pesetas in a single night, something that did not sit well with some of the big casinos: in Las Vegas, the group was even threatened at gunpoint to stop them playing.

Years after making the headlines, Pelayo and his family chose to bet on online poker, launching an academy where they explained new methods that helped win it. One of his school's apprentices, Carlos Mortensen, became a poker world champion in 2001, sponsored by Pelayo. However, according to Pelayo, the new gaming regulations were limiting the profits, and as a result "all the good players we had decided to leave". As of 2017 Pelayo is still banned from entering casinos in France and Denmark.

== Plot synopsis ==
Gonzalo García Pelayo has been trying for years to work out a system to legally win money in a local casino, which is run by the infamous The Beast. When he realizes he has succeeded in doing so, using a system based on wheel bias, he drags his family in to help — son Iván, daughter Vanessa, their cousins Marcos and muscle-bound Alfredo, and family friend Balón.

Driven by Ivan's desire to give his father a decent old age, the gang sets to work, at first unsuccessfully. But when they start winning, the Beast's suspicions are aroused, and he puts a private detective onto them. Alfredo compromises the plan by getting involved with croupier Ingrid, who is summarily fired by the Beast. Next, Iván starts a romance with Chinese wild girl Shui, whose friends turn out to be quite handy later on.

== Cast ==
- Daniel Brühl as Iván
- Lluís Homar as Gonzalo García Pelayo
- Miguel Ángel Silvestre as Alfredo
- Eduard Fernández as The Beast
- Oriol Vila as Marcos
- Vicente Romero as Balón
- Blanca Suárez as Ingrid
- Marina Salas as Vanessa
- Huichi Chiu as Shui

== Production ==
The film is an Alea Docs & Films and Bausan Films and production. Shooting locations included the casinos of Lloret de Mar and Mallorca as well as Girona's Barri Vell.

== Release ==
Winning Streak premiered at the 15th Málaga Film Festival on 21 April 2012, and began its theatrical run in Spain on 27 April 2012. The film was also released in theatres in Russia and Poland, and in Canada it was shown at both the Ottawa European Union Film Festival—on 16 November 2012—and the Vancouver European Union Film Festival on 23 November 2013. It was released straight-to-DVD in Brazil, Germany, Greece and Japan.

The film was on the program of the 2014 edition of Thailand's EU Film Festival, shown in the cities of Khon Kaen, Chiang Mai and Bangkok. Advertised as The Pelayos, the film was one of seven films that were shown in all three cities.

== Reception ==
=== Critical response ===
The film received mixed to negative reviews from film critics. Jonathan Holland of the Variety wrote, "Ocean's Eleven tries to become a Hispanic Magnificent Seven in Winning Streak a disappointingly straight-ahead take on one family's high-risk attempt to get rich by beating the casinos. Despite its terrific real-life storyline, a couple of fine perfs and slick visuals, the pic stumbles in its eagerness to please all comers, failing to generate much real tension and leaving its characters as flat as poker chips". Sonia Sanz of Cultture.com criticized actors Daniel Brühl, Lluís Homar, Oriol Vila, Eduard Fernández and Blanca Suárez for their "underwhelming" performances, and called the film itself "disappointing". Emilio Luna of the El Antepenúltimo Mohicano gave the film a rather negative review and awarded it with four out of ten stars.

In a more positive review of the film, Patrick Mullen of Cinemablographer.com wrote, "Brühl and Homar's work is worth noting since they manage to draw out characters that don't seem to be part of the film's thin script. [...] Winning Streak is a fun little caper all the same, slight as it may be. Winning Streak probably won't break the bank, but it should at least break even", and gave the film three out of five stars.

=== Awards and nominations ===
Year	Award	Category	Nominee(s)	Result	Ref.
2012	15th Málaga Film Festival	Best Film Editing	Koldo Idígoras	Won	
2012	Neox Fan Awards 2012	Best Film Actress	Blanca Suárez	Won	
2012	Neox Fan Awards 2012	Best Film	Winning Streak	Nominated	
2013	5th Gaudí Awards	Best Production Manager	Eduard Vallès	Won	
2013	5th Gaudí Awards	Best Art Direction	Balter Gallart	Nominated	
2013	5th Gaudí Awards	Best Cinematography	David Omedes	Nominated	
2013	5th Gaudí Awards	Best Film not in the Catalan Language	Winning Streak	Nominated	

== See also ==
- List of Spanish films of 2012
