= Arón Piper =

German-Spanish actor and singer-songwriter (born 1997)

- Piper in 2026
- Born: Arón Julio Manuel Piper Barbero; 29 March 1997 (age 29); Berlin, Germany
- Citizenship: Germany; Spain
- Occupations: Actor; singer
- Years active: 2004–present

Arón Julio Manuel Piper Barbero (Spanish: [aˈɾom ˈpipeɾ], (Note: In isolation, Arón is pronounced [aˈɾon].) German: [ˈpiːpɐ]; born 29 March 1997) is a German-Spanish actor and singer-songwriter, best known for his starring role as Ander Muñoz in the Netflix teen drama series Elite (2018–2021). In April 2020, Piper released his debut single "Sigo", under the mononym Aron (stylized in all caps). His debut album En tus sueños (Vol. 1) was released in March 2023.

== Early and personal life ==
Piper was born in 1997 in Berlin, Germany, to a German father and a Spanish mother. When Piper was five years old, they moved to Spain. After residing in Catalonia for some years (namely in Barcelona and Garrotxa), his family relocated to Asturias (where he lived in Avilés and Luarca).

Piper started to write music at the age of 12. With his father being a film editor, he had an interest in acting since childhood, which he went on to study. He is fluent in both German and Spanish, as well as knowing some English and Catalan. As of January 2024, he lives in Madrid.

== Filmography ==
=== Film ===
Year	Title	Role	Notes	Ref.
2004	The Gunman			
2011	Maktub	Iñaki		
2013	15 Years and One Day	Jon		
2016	La corona partida	Ferdinand I, Holy Roman Emperor		
2019	Los Rodríguez y el más allá	Jacobo		
2021	Érase una vez en Euskadi (Once Upon a Time in Euskadi)	Maserati		
2022	Código emperador	Fernando		
2023	Fatum	Alejo		
2023	Sayen	Antonio Torres		
2024	El correo (The Courier)	Iván		
2025	La tregua (The Truce)	Telmo Reyes		
2026	Hugo 24	Hugo		
2027	Day Drinker †		Post-production	

=== Television ===
Year	Title	Role	Notes	Ref.
2016	Centro médico	Rubén Santos	1 episode	
2017	Centro médico	Adrián Muriana García	1 episode	
2018–21	Elite	Ander Muñoz	32 episodes	
2019	Derecho a soñar	Luis Rojas	28 episodes	
2020	The Mess You Leave Behind	Iago Nogueira	8 episodes	
2021	Élite: historias breves	Ander Muñoz	3 episodes	
2023	Muted	Sergio Ciscar	6 episodes	

== Discography ==
=== Albums ===
- En tus sueños (Vol. 1) (2023)
- Arón Piper (2025)

=== EPs ===
- Nieve (2021)
- Desahogo (2022) – with Papi Trujillo

=== Singles ===
- "Sigo" (2020) – with Moonkey & Mygal
- "Prendiendo fuego" (2020) – with Maximiliano Calvo & Soleá Morente
- "Mal" (2020)
- "Rosé" (2020) – with Moonkey
- "Todo" (2020) – with Mygal
- "Friends" (2020)
- "Errada ela não tá" (2021) – with Jottapê & Kevinho
- "Me reces" (2021)
- "Cu4tro" (2021) – with Polimá Westcoast & Pablo Chill-E
- "Bon Voyage" – with Polimá Westcoast
- "Ojalá" (2022)
- "Desahogo" (2022) – with Papi Trujillo
- "Calma" (2022) – with MC Dede, Lyvinte & Omizs
- "London Calling" (2022) – feat. Mygal
- "Serotonina" (2022) – with Big Soto & Mora
- "En tus sueños" (2023)
- "Invisibilidad" (2024)
- "Especial" (2024)
- "Pirata espacial" (2025)

==== As a featured artist ====
- "Diamantes" (2020) – Chill Chicos feat. Aron
- "RIP" (2021) – Zizzy feat. Aron, Omizs & Selene
- "Vie de rêve" (2022) – Omizs feat. Aron
- "Cadillac" (2022) – Omizs feat. Aron
- "Big Drip" (2022) – Jok'Air feat. Aron & LineMa
- "Que Dios me perdone" (2022) – Lucho SSJ feat. Aron
- "Vamo pa el cuarto" (2022) – Frijo feat. Papi Trujillo & Aron

== Awards and nominations ==
Award	Year	Category	Nominated work	Result	Ref.
Goya Awards	2014	Best Original Song	15 Years and One Day	Nominated	
