= Sayen =

- Amazon Prime Video release poster
- Directed by: Alexander Witt
- Written by: Carla Stagno, Julio Rojas
- Produced by: Pablo Larraín; Juan de Dios Larraín; Rocío Jadue
- Starring: Rallen Montenegro; Arón Piper; Enrique rce
- Production company: Fábula
- Distributed by: Amazon MGM Studios
- Release date: March 3, 2023
- Country: Chile
- Language: Spanish

Sayen is a 2023 Chilean action thriller film directed by Alexander Witt and written by Patricio Lynch and Carla Stagno. It stars Rallen Montenegro, Arón Piper, and Enrique Arce. It had its international premiere on March 3, 2023, on Amazon Prime Video.

== Plot ==
Sayen (Rallen Montenegro) is a young Mapuche woman who lives in the Araucanía Region with her grandmother, the last of her family. One day, she discovers a dangerous conspiracy led by a corporation seeking to take over her community's lands to extract a valuable mineral. When her grandmother is killed by the company's hitmen, Sayen decides to avenge her death and stop the plan. To do so, she will use her training and knowledge of nature, becoming a Mapuche warrior who will pursue the culprits to the end.

== Cast ==
- Rallen Montenegro as Sayen
- Arón Piper as Antonio Torres
- Enrique Arce as Máximo Torres
- Loreto Aravena as Miranda
- Alejandro Trejo as Lira
- Roberto García Ruiz as Bykov
- Eduardo Paxeco as Rubén

== Production ==
In May 2021, Fabula received the green light from Amazon to produce Sayen, a trilogy of movies to be directed by Alexander Witt, with Juan de Dios Larraín, Pablo Larraín, and Rocío Jadue as executive producers. In August, Rallen Montenegro was chosen for the role of Sayen from 250 candidates, along with the announcement of Roberto García Ruiz, Alejandro Trejo, Loreto Aravena, and Eduardo Paxeco in supporting roles.
