= The Truce (2025 film) =

- Theatrical release poster
- Spanish: La tregua
- Directed by: Miguel Ángel Vivas Moreno
- Screenplay by: Fran Carballal; Ignasi Rubio; Miguel Ángel Vivas Moreno; Olzhas Zhahaydarov
- Produced by: César Benítez; Emilio Amaré; Álvaro Benítez
- Starring: Miguel Herrán; Arón Piper; Javier Pereira; Fernando Valdivielso; Alejandro Jato; Federico Pérez Rey; José Pastor; Manel Llunell; Sergey Ufimtsev; Dina Tasbulatova; Diego Montejo; Sara Robisco; Altinay Nogerbeck; Farabi Akkozov; Daniel Horvath
- Cinematography: Rafa García
- Edited by: Ángel Armada
- Music by: Víctor Reyes
- Production companies: Spassks99 AIE; Amanat Capital; Umaifilm
- Distributed by: Tripictures (Spain) Ascar Cinema (Kazakhstan)
- Release dates: 25 September 2025 (Zinemaldia); 10 October 2025 (Spain); 30 October 2025 (Kazakhstan)
- Countries: Spain; Kazakhstan
- Languages: Spanish; Russian; Kazakh

The Truce (Spanish: La tregua, Kazakh: Бітім) is a 2025 war drama film co-written and directed by Miguel Ángel Vivas, starring Miguel Herrán and Arón Piper.

== Plot ==
Set in Karlag, the plot follows two military officers who were at opposing sides of the Spanish Civil War, now forced to join efforts in a Soviet gulag during World War II.

== Cast ==
- Miguel Herrán as Salgado
- Arón Piper as Telmo Reyes
- Javier Pereira as Páter
- Fernando Valdivielso as Junqueras
- Alejandro Jato as Freire
- Federico Pérez Rey as Hermida
- José Pastor as Artigas
- Manel Llunell as Palau
- Sergey Ufimtsev as Nazarov
- Dina Tasbulatova as Aisulu
- Diego Montejo
- Sara Robisco
- Altinay Nogerbeck
- Farabi Akkozov
- Daniel Horvath
- Algis Arlauskas as Lavrenti Beria

== Production ==
The film is a Spanish-Kazakh co-production by Spassks99 AIE, Amanat Capital, and Umaifilm and it had the participation of RTVE and Plano a Plano and the collaboration of Netflix. Shooting locations included the Dima aerodrome, that stood in for the Karlag corrective labor camp, the Lucía mine in Atauri, and the Pamplona Airport.

== Release ==
The film was presented at the 73rd San Sebastián International Film Festival in 24 September 2025. It is scheduled to be released theatrically in Spain on 10 October 2025 by Tripictures.

== Reception ==
Manuel J. Lombardo of Diario de Sevilla lamented that the film fails "due to repetition and schematism".

== Accolades ==
Year	Award	Category	Nominee(s)	Result	Ref.
2026	40th Goya Awards	Best Makeup and Hairstyles	Sarai Rodríguez, David Moreno, Óscar del Monte	Nominated	

== See also ==
- List of Spanish films of 2025
