= The Courier (2024 film) =

- Theatrical release poster
- Spanish: El correo
- Directed by: Daniel Calparsoro
- Screenplay by: Patxi Amezcua; Alejo Flah
- Produced by: Borja Pena; Emma Lustres
- Starring: Arón Piper; María Pedraza; Luis Tosar; Laura Sépul; Nourdin Batán; José Manuel Poga; Luis Zahera
- Cinematography: Tommie Ferreras
- Edited by: Antonio Frutos
- Music by: Carlos Jean
- Production companies: Vaca Films; Panache Productions; La Compagnie Cinématographique
- Distributed by: Universal Pictures International Spain
- Release date: 19 January 2024 (Spain)
- Countries: Spain; Belgium; France
- Language: Spanish

The Courier (Spanish: El correo) is a 2024 crime thriller film directed by Daniel Calparsoro from a screenplay by Patxi Amezcua and Alejo Flah which stars Arón Piper alongside María Pedraza and Luis Tosar.

== Plot ==
The plot is set in 2002 against the backdrop of the beginning of circulation of the euro. It follows the rise of a young valet from Vallecas (Iván) through the ranks of an international cartel dedicated to money laundering.

== Cast ==
- Arón Piper as Iván
- María Pedraza as Leticia
- Luis Tosar as Escámez
- Laura Sépul as Anne Marie
- Nourdin Batan as Yannick
- José Manuel Poga as Javier Ocaña
- Luis Zahera as comisario Roig
- Hervé Falciani as himself

== Production ==
The film was produced by Vaca Films alongside Panache Productions and La Compagnie Cinématographique, in association with Playtime and the participation of Netflix, RTVE, Movistar Plus+, Canal+, and Ciné+. The shooting locations included Madrid, Brussels, Marbella, Geneva, and Hong Kong.

== Release ==
Distributed by Universal Pictures International Spain, the film was released theatrically in Spain on 19 January 2024.

== Reception ==
On the review aggregator website Rotten Tomatoes, 40% of 5 critics' reviews are positive, with an average rating of 5.8/10.

Raquel Hernández Luján of HobbyConsolas rated the film with 78 points ('good') citing the "spectacular" score by Carlos Jean and Calparsoro's direction as positive points while negatively citing the "somewhat poor" choice pertaining the use of the protagonist's voice-over as a narrative guiding resource.

Javier Ocaña of El País deemed the film to be "a product with an unblemished appearance", with Calparsoros's usual "energy and colorfulness", although "without complexity and without any significant reflections".

Eduard Castaño of Diari de Tarragona wrote that El correo is "in short, a film to enjoy and not so much to delve into its protagonists", featuring some of the elements that turned The Wolf of Wall Street into a successful film.

== See also ==
- List of Spanish films of 2024
