= Everything in Place =

- Theatrical release poster
- Spanish: Cuando todo esté en orden
- Directed by: César Martínez Herrada
- Screenplay by: Carlos Pérez Merinero; Ion Arretxe
- Starring: Santiago Ramos; Daniel Guzmán; Miguel Rellán; Cristina Plazas; Mario Zorrilla; Antonio Dechent
- Cinematography: Ángel Luis Fernández
- Edited by: Luis Villar
- Music by: Pablo Cervantes
- Production companies: Dexiderius Producciones; Caligari Films
- Distributed by: Nirvana Films; Wanda Visión
- Release dates: 2002 (Málaga); 17 May 2002 (Spain)
- Country: Spain
- Language: Spanish

Everything in Place (Spanish: Cuando todo esté en orden) is a 2002 Spanish drama film directed by César Martínez Herrada from a screenplay by Carlos Pérez Merinero and Ion Arretxe starring Daniel Guzmán and Santiago Ramos alongside Miguel Rellán, Cristina Plazas, Mario Zorrilla, and Antonio Dechent.

== Plot ==
The plot tracks the uneasy reunion between widower (and early retiree) Ignacio and his recovering drug addict son Pablo.

== Cast ==
- Santiago Ramos as Ignacio
- Daniel Guzmán as Pablo
- Cristina Plazas as Maribel
- Manolo Solo as Juan
- Celeste Rodríguez as Sandra
- Mario Zorrilla as Esteban
- Miguel Rellán as Gerardo
- Antonio Dechent as director coro ('choir director')
- Julián Villagrán as Santi
- José Luis García Pérez as tipo duro ('tough guy')

== Production ==
The film is a Dexiderius and Caligari production and it had the participation of Canal Sur and backing from Junta de Andalucía and the Spanish Ministry of Education, Culture and Sport. Shooting locations included Alcalá de Guadaíra, Camas, Mairena del Alcor, and Seville.

== Release ==
The film made it to the competitive slate of the 5th Málaga Film Festival. Distributed by Nirvana and Wanda Visión, the film was released theatrically in Spain on 17 May 2002.

== Reception ==
Jonathan Holland of Variety wrote that "built around a trio of well-observed perfs, pis is a finely scripted take on a family destroyed by a drug-addict son".

Casimiro Torreiro of El País considered that despite some difficulties that the film manifests, it is necessary to watch a film like this one because of "its honesty", and "disarming humanity".

== Accolades ==
Year	Award	Category	Nominee(s)	Result	Ref.
2002	5th Málaga Film Festival	Best Music	Pablo Cervantes	Won	
2002	5th Málaga Film Festival	Jury Special Mention for Best Male Performance	Daniel Guzmán	Won	

== See also ==
- List of Spanish films of 2002
