= Orson West =

- Directed by: Fran Ruvira
- Screenplay by: Fran Ruvira
- Produced by: Ferran Monje; Xavier Crespo; Juan Carlos Claver
- Starring: Sonia Almarcha; Frank Feys; Jorge Yamam; Montserrat Carulla
- Cinematography: Carles Gusi
- Edited by: Ariadna Ribas
- Music by: Marc Vaillo
- Production companies: Canónigo Films; Dacsa Produccions; Black Flag Cinema
- Release dates: 28 April 2012 (D'A); 22 June 2012
- Running time: 87 minutes
- Country: Spain
- Language: Spanish

Orson West is a 2012 drama film written and directed by Fran Ruvira. It stars Sonia Almarcha, Frank Feys, Jorge Yamam, and Montserrat Carulla.

== Plot ==
A film crew arrives in the arid lands straddling the provinces of Murcia and Alicante to shoot a low-budget Western, half a century after Orson Welles attempted to shoot The Survivors, marking the lead actress' return to her homeland while also disrupting the lives of the local folks.

== Cast ==
- Sonia Almarcha
- Frank Feys
- Jorge Yamam
- Montserrat Carulla

== Production ==
The film was produced Canónigo Films and Dacsa Produccions alongside Black Flag Cinema, with backing from TV3, ICAA, ICIC, and ICF. Shooting locations included El Pinós, Novelda, Villena, and Alicante.

== Release ==
The film was presented in the 'Autoria Catalana' slate of the Barcelona-based D'A Film Festival on 28 April 2012. It was released theatrically in Spain on 22 June 2012.

== Reception ==
Nuria Vidal of Fotogramas rated the film 3 out of 5 stars, billing it as "a thought-provoking experiment that goes beyond the boundaries of conventional cinema".

Salvador Llopart of La Vanguardia described the film as "a complex work", "told with visual flair" yet noting the presence unwoven narrative elements.

== Accolades ==
Year	Award	Category	Nominee(s)	Result	Ref.
2013	5th Gaudí Awards	Best Original Music	Marc Vaillo	Nominated	
2013	22nd Actors and Actresses Union Awards	Best Film Actress in a Leading Role	Sonia Almarcha	Nominated	

== See also ==
- List of Spanish films of 2012
