= José Manuel Poga =

Spanish actor (born 1979)

José Manuel Rivera "Poga" (born 10 May 1979) is a Spanish actor from Andalusia. He is best known for his villain role playing Gandía in Money Heist.

== Biography ==
José Manuel Rivera "Poga" was born in Jerez de la Frontera on 10 May 1979. He made his television acting debut in 2007 as an extra in comedy television series La que se avecina. His performance in Orange Honey (2012) earned him a Best Actor nomination at the 2013 Andalusian Film Critics' Awards ASECAN.

He gained notoriety for his work in action thriller television series Money Heist, playing villainous César Gandía, the hateful, racist, homophobic, and violent chief security officer of the Bank of Spain.

== Filmography ==
=== Film ===
Year	Title	Role	Notes	Ref
2012	Miel de naranjas (Orange Honey)	Leopoldo		
2013	Grupo 7 (Unit 7)	Mateo		
2014	321 días en Míchigan (321 Days in Michigan)	El Rubio		
2014	El Niño	Mario		
2015	Palmeras en la nieve (Palm Trees in the Snow)			
2015	La luz con el tiempo dentro	Rafael Alberti		
2016	Toro	Ginés		
2017	Oro (Gold)			
2018	La sombra de la ley (Gun City)			
2019	Taxi a Gibraltar (Taxi to Gibraltar)	Manchester		
2019	La trinchera infinita (The Endless Trench)	Rodrigo		
2022	La fortaleza (The Fortress)	Jorge		
2023	Infiesto	El Demonio		
2024	El correo (The Courier)	Javier Ocaña		

=== Television ===
Year	Title	Role	Notes	Ref
2015	Aquí Paz y después Gloria	Roque		
2016	Bajo sospecha	Marcos Lara	Introduced in season 2	
2016	Víctor Ros	El Estepeño		
2018	Fugitiva	Tobías		
2018	Gigantes	Alfonso		
2017	El ministerio del tiempo	William Martín		
2019–21	La casa de papel (Money Heist)	César Gandía	Introduced in part 3. Main antagonist in part 4	
2021	Grasa	El Fati	Introduced in season 2	
2021	Sky Rojo	Fermín		
2023	Tú también lo harías	Dante Bazán		
2023	El cuerpo en llamas (Burning Body)	Pedro		

== Accolades ==
Year	Award	Category	Work	Result	Ref.
2024	11th Feroz Awards	Best Supporting Actor in a Series	Burning Body	Nominated	
2024	3rd Carmen Awards	Best Actor	The Fortress	Nominated	
2026	5th Carmen Awards	Best Supporting Actor	Enemies	Nominated	
