= Blancanieves =

2012 film

- Theatrical release poster
- Directed by: Pablo Berger
- Screenplay by: Pablo Berger
- Based on: Snow White by Jacob Grimm; Wilhelm Grimm
- Produced by: Ibon Cormenzana; Jérôme Vidal; Pablo Berger
- Starring: Maribel Verdú; Daniel Giménez Cacho; Pere Ponce; José María Pou; Inma Cuesta; Ángela Molina; Sofía Oria; Macarena García
- Cinematography: Kiko de la Rica
- Edited by: Fernando Franco
- Music by: Alfonso de Vilallonga
- Production companies: Arcadia Motion Pictures; Mama Films; Nix Films; Sisifo Films; The Kraken Films; Noodles Production; Arte France Cinéma
- Distributed by: Wanda Distribución Cinematográfica de Films S.A. (Spain); Rézo Films (France)
- Release dates: 8 September 2012 (TIFF); 28 September 2012 (Spain)
- Running time: 105 minutes
- Countries: Spain; France
- Box office: $240,310 (US)

Blancanieves (known as Blancaneu in Catalan and Snow White in English) is a 2012 black-and-white silent drama film written and directed by Pablo Berger. A Spanish-French co-production based on the 1812 fairy tale Snow White by the Brothers Grimm, the story is set in a romantic vision of 1920s Andalusia. However, the film approaches storytelling through the integration of Spanish culture from characters' names to traditions they follow. Additionally, the film alludes to other fairy tales including Cinderella and Little Red Riding Hood. While it retells stories originally told through tales based in fantasy, it derails from the traditional storytelling method that ends with a happily ever after. Instead, the film is rather dark and ends in tragedy. Berger calls it a "love letter to European silent cinema."

Blancanieves was Spain's 85th Academy Awards official submission to Best Foreign Language category, but it did not make the shortlist. The film won the Special Jury Prize and an ex-aequo Best Actress "Silver Shell" Award for Macarena García at the 2012 San Sebastián International Film Festival. It was also nominated in every category for which it was eligible at the 27th Goya Awards (except for Best Sound), winning ten Goya Awards, including the Best Film.

== Plot ==
As a Spanish adaptation of the Brothers Grimm fairytale, Snow White, the film Blancanieves follows the life of Carmen. Her mother died during childbirth, and her father was left paralyzed after a traumatic bullfighting incident shortly before her birth. Her grandmother cares for her, but after her death, she is left in the care of her stepmother, who married her father for his fame and riches he accumulated as a bull fighter. She mistreats Carmen's father, as he is often left helpless in a room, however Carmen spends time communicating as best as she can with her father.

After consistent abuse and mistreatment, Carmen is fearful for her safety and well-being. One day, she is sent out into the woods to gather flowers. The huntsman is sent out after her, where he assaults her, attempts to drown her, and leaves her for dead. She is unconscious, floating downstream, when a group of bullfighters find her and carry her to their home. When she comes to consciousness, she is unable to remember her history, including her name. They begin referring to her as Blancanieves, which translates to Snow White, because of her fair appearance. She grows close to the group of men, who are a traveling spectacle of bull fighters with dwarfism. Eventually, she begins bullfighting herself, unaware that her natural skill comes from the time she spent practicing with her father as a child.

Carmen's stepmother learns of Carmen's work as a bullfighter and is left in disbelief, as she thought Carmen had been killed many years ago. She attends a fight, masked in a veil. After a successful fight in the bullfighting ring, the audience is throwing flowers at Carmen. The stepmother reaches out and offers her a poisoned apple. Carmen unsuspectingly takes it and takes a bite. She instantly falls to the ground, and the audience begins to panic. She is transferred into a glass coffin, as they are all under the impression she has died. Rather than laying her to rest, they create a spectacle out of her. They begin charging the public for an opportunity to kiss the famous bullfighter, Blancanieves. In the end, the focus shifts to Carmen lying in the casket, where a single tear runs down her cheek.

== Cast ==
- Macarena García as Carmen Villalta / Blancanieves
- Maribel Verdú as Encarna, the evil stepmother
- Daniel Giménez Cacho as Antonio Villalta, the father
- Ángela Molina as Doña Concha, the grandmother
- Inma Cuesta as Carmen de Triana, the mother
- Sofía Oria as Carmencita, little Carmen
- Josep Maria Pou as Don Carlos, the impresario
- Ramón Barea as Don Martín, Antonio's manager
- Pere Ponce as Genaro Bilbao, Encarna's chauffeur
- Emilio Gavira as Jesusín

== Production ==
The inspiration for the film began when writer-director Pablo Berger saw a photograph of bullfighting dwarves in España Oculta (1989, ISBN 8477820686), by Cristina García Rodero. By 2003, Berger had written Blancanieves and was working to raise funds for it soon after his film Torremolinos 73 was appearing at festivals. In May 2011, he was working on the storyboards for Blancanieves, a film he had in the works for eight years, and he was about to begin principal photography when news reached him that The Artist had been shown at the 2011 Cannes Film Festival:

"Nobody knew about The Artist until it appeared in Cannes. It was completely out of the blue. I was in my office in Madrid, doing the storyboards for my film, when a producer friend sent me a text message from the festival saying, 'I've just seen The Artist, it's black and white and silent and it's going to be huge.' I almost threw my phone against the wall. The high concept was gone."

According to Berger, Blancanieves is a "love letter to European silent cinema, ... especially French. Abel Gance for me is God. Movies like Napoleon, J'Accuse!, La Roue are extraordinary."

Pablo Berger emphasized the idea that his silent film adaptation of the fairytale, Snow White, takes a much darker approach than traditional tellings of the tale. Even on the cover of the Blancanieves DVD, there is text that reads, "They never told you the story like this before ..." emphasizing the idea that this interpretation is different from the others.

While the silent, black and white aesthetic was applied to the film as an homage to films from the 20th century, it additionally used modern techniques to give the film a unique look. The cinematic techniques and style included depth throughout many shots. The styling of each shot provides a dynamic effect on the visuals in the film. Techniques like this were not possible during the time when silent films were popular. The film works to address and include various technologies throughout the past century. While the camera work and aspects of the picture are modern, there are also techniques and styles used that reflect film from the 20th century.

2012 saw the screening of two other loose adaptations of Snow White: Mirror, Mirror and Snow White and the Huntsman.

== Reception ==
On review aggregator Rotten Tomatoes, Blancanieves holds an approval rating of 95%, based on 112 reviews, and an average rating of 7.8/10. Its consensus reads: "Smartly written and beautiful to behold, Blancanieves uses its classic source material to offer a dark tale, delightfully told." On Metacritic, the film has a weighted average score of 82 out of 100, based on 21 critics, indicating "Universal acclaim".

The Guardian's Peter Bradshaw called it "extraordinarily enjoyable", awarding it five stars out of five and saying Pablo Berger "finds new life and heart in the old myth – certainly more than the recent Hollywood retreads – and daringly locates possibilities for both evil and romance in the ranks of the dwarves themselves"; the director "takes inspiration from Hitchcock, with hints of Rebecca and Psycho, Buñuel, Browning and Almodóvar, and conjures a fascinatingly ambiguous ending: melancholy, eerie and erotic. A film to treasure."

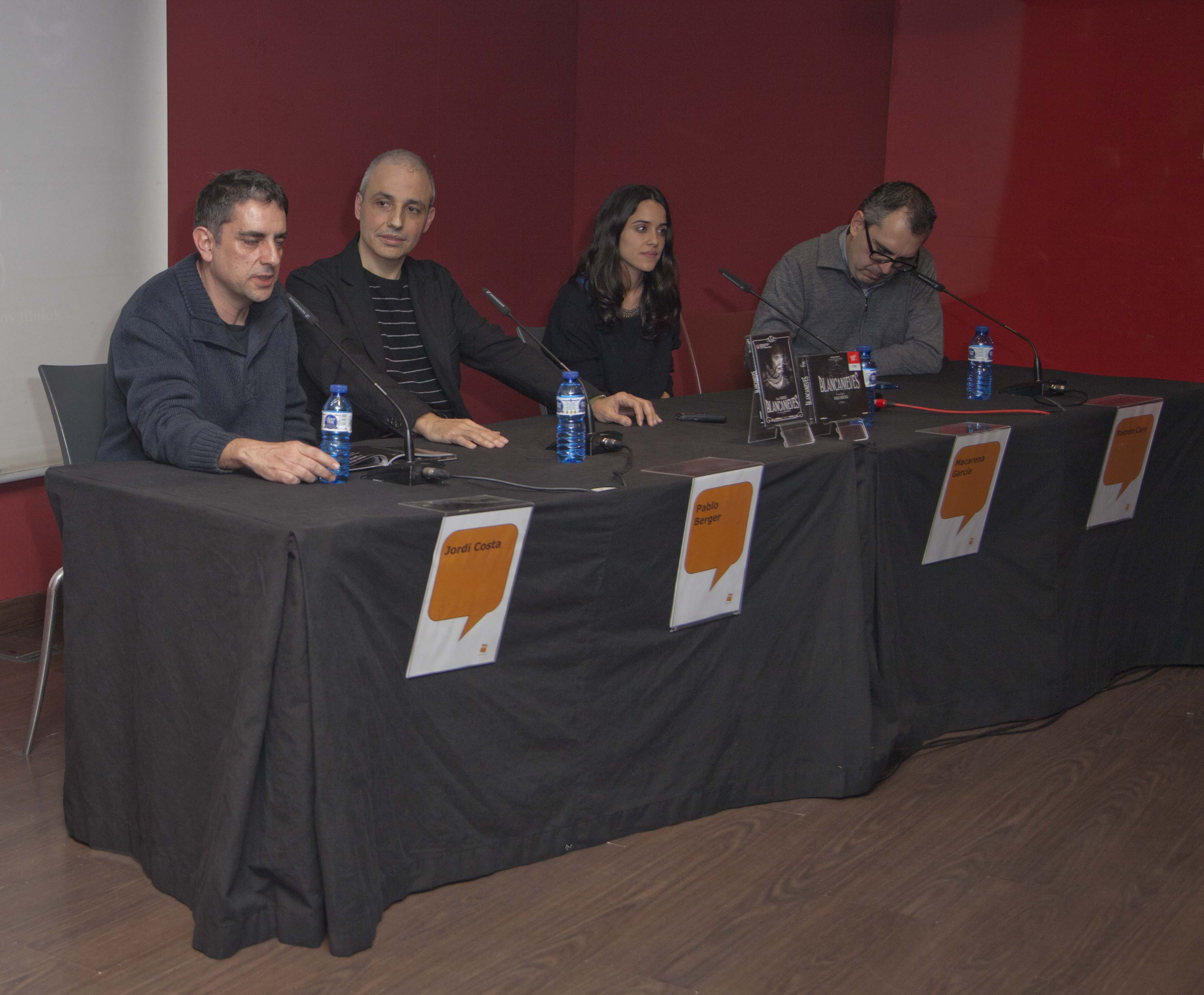
Director Pablo Berger and actress Macarena García participate in a panel in Spain.

Chicago Sun-Times film critic Roger Ebert gave the film four out of four stars, writing that the film "Is a full-bodied silent film of the sort that might have been made by the greatest directors of the 1920s, if such details as the kinky sadomasochism of this film's evil stepmother could have been slipped past the censors." Later, he chose it to be shown at the 2013 Roger Ebert's Overlooked Film Festival.

The film, while resembling styles of the 20th century, focused on the story of a female lead. The main character's name, Carmen, emphasizes the importance of the character's divinity, as it means "song" or "garden". However, she fits into the mold of traditional beauty standards set up for women, which have been present since much earlier than just films in the 20th century. This form of representation is often critiqued, as are minimal forms of diversity represented, yet they still adhere to most traditional beauty norms.

=== Accolades ===
Year	Award	Category	Nominee(s)	Result	Ref.
2012	60th San Sebastián International Film Festival	Special Jury Prize		Won	
2012	60th San Sebastián International Film Festival	Silver Shell for Best Actress	Macarena García	Won	
2013	18th Forqué Awards	Best Film		Won	
2013	18th Forqué Awards	Best Actress	Maribel Verdú	Won	
2013	18th Forqué Awards	Best Actress	Macarena García	Nominated	
2013	5th Gaudí Awards	Best Film		Won	
2013	5th Gaudí Awards	Best Director	Pablo Berger	Nominated	
2013	5th Gaudí Awards	Best Screenplay	Pablo Berger	Nominated	
2013	5th Gaudí Awards	Best Female Lead	Ángela Molina	Nominated	
2013	5th Gaudí Awards	Best Female Lead	Maribel Verdú	Nominated	
2013	5th Gaudí Awards	Best Cinematography	Kiko de la Rica	Nominated	
2013	5th Gaudí Awards	Best Art Direction	Alain Bainée	Won	
2013	5th Gaudí Awards	Best Costume Design	Paco Delgado	Won	
2013	5th Gaudí Awards	Best Film Editing	Fernando Franco	Nominated	
2013	5th Gaudí Awards	Best Make-Up and Hairstyles	Fermín Galán, Sylvie Imbert	Nominated	
2013	5th Gaudí Awards	Best Original Score	Alfonso de Villalonga	Won	
2013	5th Gaudí Awards	Best Special/Visual Effects	Reyes Abades, Ferrán Piquer	Nominated	
2013	Latin ACE Awards	Best Film		Won	
2013	Latin ACE Awards	Best Actress	Maribel Verdú	Won	
2013	Latin ACE Awards	Best Supporting Actor	Daniel Giménez Cacho	Won	
2013	27th Goya Awards	Best Film		Won	
2013	27th Goya Awards	Best Director	Pablo Berger	Nominated	
2013	27th Goya Awards	Best Actor	Daniel Giménez Cacho	Nominated	
2013	27th Goya Awards	Best Actress	Maribel Verdú	Won	
2013	27th Goya Awards	Best Supporting Actor	Josep Maria Pou	Nominated	
2013	27th Goya Awards	Best Supporting Actress	Ángela Molina	Nominated	
2013	27th Goya Awards	Best New Actor	Emilio Gavira	Nominated	
2013	27th Goya Awards	Best New Actress	Macarena García	Won	
2013	27th Goya Awards	Best Original Screenplay	Pablo Berger	Won	
2013	27th Goya Awards	Best Cinematography	Kiko de la Rica	Won	
2013	27th Goya Awards	Best Editing	Fernando Franco	Nominated	
2013	27th Goya Awards	Best Art Direction	Alain Bainée	Won	
2013	27th Goya Awards	Best Production Supervision	Josep Amorós	Nominated	
2013	27th Goya Awards	Best Special Effects	Reyes Abades, Ferrán Piquer	Nominated	
2013	27th Goya Awards	Best Costume Design	Paco Delgado	Won	
2013	27th Goya Awards	Best Makeup and Hairstyles	Sylvie Imbert, Fermín Galán	Won	
2013	27th Goya Awards	Best Original Score	Alfonso de Villalonga	Won	
2013	27th Goya Awards	Best Original Song	"No te puedo encontrar" by Pablo Berger and Juan Gómez "Chicuelo"	Won	
2013	55th Ariel Awards	Best Ibero-American Film	Pablo Berger	Won	
2013	22nd Actors and Actresses Union Awards	Best Film Actress in a Leading Role	Maribel Verdú	Won	
2013	22nd Actors and Actresses Union Awards	Best Film Actor in a Leading Role	Daniel Giménez Cacho	Nominated	
2013	22nd Actors and Actresses Union Awards	Best Film Actress in a Secondary Role	Ángela Molina	Nominated	
2013	22nd Actors and Actresses Union Awards	Best Film Actress in a Minor Role	Inma Cuesta	Nominated	
2013	22nd Actors and Actresses Union Awards	Best Film Actor in a Minor Role	Ramón Barea	Nominated	
2013	22nd Actors and Actresses Union Awards	Best Film Actor in a Minor Role	Pere Ponce	Nominated	
2013	26th European Film Awards	Best Film		Nominated	
2013	26th European Film Awards	Best Director	Pablo Berger	Nominated	
2013	26th European Film Awards	Best Costume Designer	Paco Delgado	Won	
2013	26th Chicago Film Critics Association Awards	Best Original Score	Alfonso de Villalonga	Nominated	
2014	14th Vancouver Film Critics Circle Awards	Best Foreign Language Film		Nominated	
2014	39th César Awards	Best Foreign Film		Nominated	
2014	40th Saturn Awards	Best International Film		Nominated	
2015	Argentinean Film Critics Association Awards	Best Ibero-American Film	Pablo Berger	Nominated	

== See also ==
- List of Spanish films of 2012
- List of black-and-white films produced since 1970
- Cinema Europe: The Other Hollywood, a 1995 documentary on the origin of European cinema
- List of submissions to the 85th Academy Awards for Best Foreign Language Film
- List of Spanish submissions for the Academy Award for Best Foreign Language Film
- Grimm's Snow White, another 2012 film based on the tale of Snow White.
- Mirror Mirror, another 2012 film based on the tale of Snow White.
- Snow White and the Huntsman, another 2012 film based on the tale of Snow White.
- Snow White: A Deadly Summer, an horror film also released on 2012 inspired by the tale of Snow White.
