= Maktub (2011 film) =

- Theatrical release poster
- Directed by: Paco Arango
- Screenplay by: Paco Arango
- Produced by: Paco Arango; María José Martínez
- Starring: Diego Peretti; Aitana Sánchez-Gijón; Goya Toledo; Andoni Hernández; Rosa María Sardá; Amparo Baró; Mariví Bilbao; Arón Piper; Sara Jiménez; Laura Esquivel; Enrique Villén; Oriol Tarrasón; Fátima Baeza; Jorge García
- Cinematography: Carlos Suárez
- Edited by: Teresa Font
- Music by: Nathan Wang
- Production company: Sonrisas que Hacen Magia Producciones AIE
- Distributed by: Warner Bros. Pictures
- Release date: 16 December 2011
- Country: Spain
- Language: Spanish

Maktub is a 2011 Spanish comedy-drama film directed by Paco Arango (in his directorial debut feature). Its cast features Diego Peretti, Aitana Sánchez-Gijón, Goya Toledo, Andoni Hernández, Laura Esquivel, and Jorge Garcia, among others.

== Plot ==
A couple in marital crisis formed by Manolo and Beatriz meet Antonio, a Canarian boy with cancer full of zest for life, thereby changing Manolo's life forever.

== Cast ==
- Diego Peretti as Manolo
- Aitana Sánchez-Gijón as Beatriz
- Goya Toledo as Mariluz
- Andoni Hernández as Antonio
- Rosa María Sardá as Guadalupe
- Amparo Baró as Merche
- Mariví Bilbao as Puri
- Arón Piper as Iñaki
- Sara Jiménez as Elena
- Laura Esquivel as Linda
- Enrique Villén as Raimundo
- Oriol Tarrasón
- Fátima Baeza
- Jorge Garcia as Carlos

== Production ==
The film is a Sonrisas que Hacen Magia Producciones AIE production, with the collaboration of Antena 3. Shooting locations included El Guincho (Garachico).

== Release ==
Distributed by Warner Bros. Pictures, the film was released theatrically in Spain on 16 December 2011.

== Critical reception ==
Jordi Costa of El País wrote that "the worst thing about 'Maktub' is not only its aggressive combination of television aesthetics and sentimentality" "but its thinly disguised status as promotional fiction".

Irene Crespo of Cinemanía rated the film 2 out of 5 stars deeming it to be a "family fable crammed with carols and faith".

== Accolades ==
Year	Award	Category	Nominee(s)	Result	Ref.
2012	26th Goya Awards	Best New Director	Paco Arango	Nominated	
2012	26th Goya Awards	Best Supporting Actress	Goya Toledo	Nominated	
2012	26th Goya Awards	Best Original Song	"Nuestra playa eres tú" by Jorge Pérez Quintero, Borja Jiménez Mérida, Patricio Martín Díaz	Nominated	
2013	22nd Actors and Actresses Union Awards	Best Film Actress in a Minor Role	Amparo Baró	Won	
2013	22nd Actors and Actresses Union Awards	Best Film Actress in a Minor Role	Goya Toledo	Nominated	
2013	22nd Actors and Actresses Union Awards	Best New Actor	Andoni Hernández	Nominated	

== See also ==
- List of Spanish films of 2011
