= Orange Honey =

- Theatrical release poster
- Spanish: Miel de naranjas
- Portuguese: Doce Amargo Amor
- Directed by: Imanol Uribe
- Written by: Remedios Crespo
- Starring: Iban Garate; Blanca Suárez; Karra Elejalde; Eduard Fernández; Carlos Santos; José Manuel Poga; Bárbara Lennie; Ángela Molina; Nora Navas
- Cinematography: Gonzalo Berridi
- Edited by: Buster Franco
- Music by: Nuno Malo
- Production companies: Alta Producción; Fado Filmes
- Distributed by: Alta Classics (es)
- Release dates: 22 April 2012 (Málaga); 1 June 2012 (Spain); 9 October 2014 (Portugal)
- Countries: Spain; Portugal
- Language: Spanish

Orange Honey (Spanish: Miel de naranjas; Portuguese: Doce Amargo Amor) is a 2012 Spanish-Portuguese period drama film directed by Imanol Uribe which stars Iban Garate, Blanca Suárez and Karra Elejalde alongside Eduard Fernández, Carlos Santos, José Manuel Poga, Bárbara Lennie, Ángela Molina and Nora Navas.

== Plot ==
Set in Andalusia in the 1950s, during the Francoist dictatorship, the plot concerns the switch towards clandestinity of Enrique, a young conscript engaged to Carmen.

== Cast ==
- Iban Garate as Enrique
- Blanca Suárez as Carmen
- Karra Elejalde as Don Eladio
- Eduard Fernández as Vicente
- Carlos Santos as Ramos
- José Manuel Poga as Leopoldo
- Bárbara Lennie as Ana
- Ángela Molina as María
- Nora Navas as Miel
- Marcantonio Del Carlo as Miguel
- Jesús Carroza
- Fernando Soto as Don José
- Marco D'Almeida

== Production ==
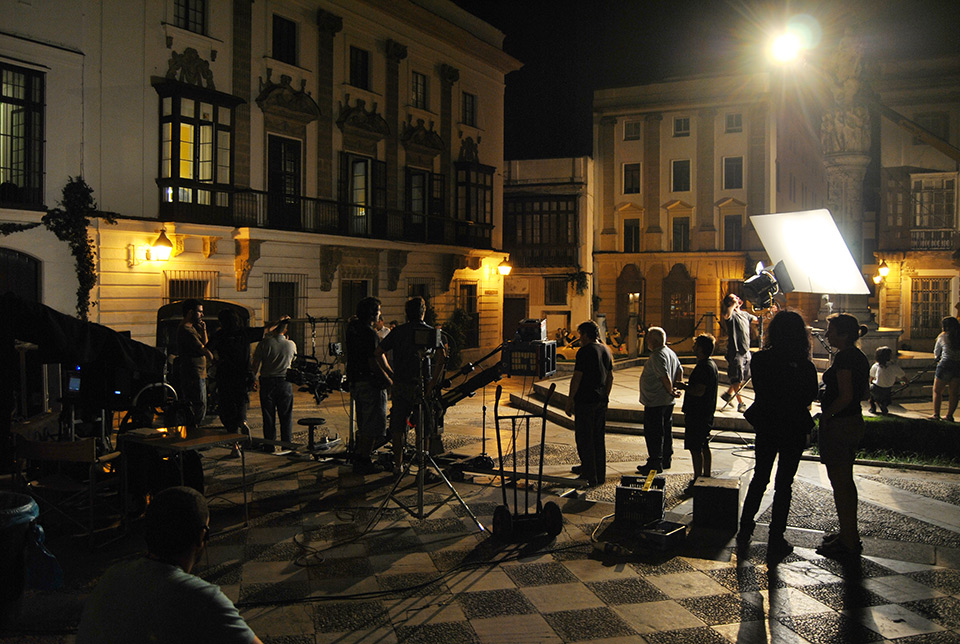
Film set in Plaza de la Asunción, Jerez, in September 2011.

Orange Honey is a joint Spanish-Portuguese co-production by Alta Producción and Fado Filmes, with participation of TVE. Shooting locations included Jerez and Madrid.

== Release ==
The film screened at the 15th Málaga Film Festival on 22 April 2012. Distributed by Alta Classics, the film had a wide release in Spanish theatres on 1 June 2012. Likewise, the release in Portuguese theatres was scheduled for 9 October 2014.

== Reception ==
Javier Ocaña of El País assessed that the writing by Remedios Crespo, "has flair, affection for his characters and a surprising naturalness in bringing together stories from both sides", even if possibly missing more dialogues concerning a deeper political-social reflection, while considering Uribe's direction to be professional and neat yet lacking any punch or surprise, hence the fresh elements in the film rather come from the combination of some script lines and some of the performances.

Jonathan Holland of Variety underscored the film to be a "well-appointed but unexciting historical thriller", with the film mixing politics, history and passion "into plodding fare", even if there are "a couple of memorable, touching scenes" towards the end of the film.

Fausto Fernández of Fotogramas scored 2 out of 5 stars, writing about the film's "languishing" tone and lack of passion, underpinning "a mechanical illustration", while pointing out that, within its "atonic" formal correctness, there are however sequences where Karra Elejalde shines as a villainous military judge.

== Accolades ==
Year	Award	Category	Nominee(s)	Result	Ref.
2012	15th Málaga Film Festival	Silver Biznaga for Best Direction	Imanol Uribe	Won	
2012	15th Málaga Film Festival	Silver Biznaga for Best New Screenwriter	Remedios Crespo	Won	
2015	4th Sophia Awards	Best Original Score	Nuno Malo	Nominated	

== See also ==
- List of Spanish films of 2012
- List of Portuguese films of 2014
