= Ángela Molina =

Spanish actress

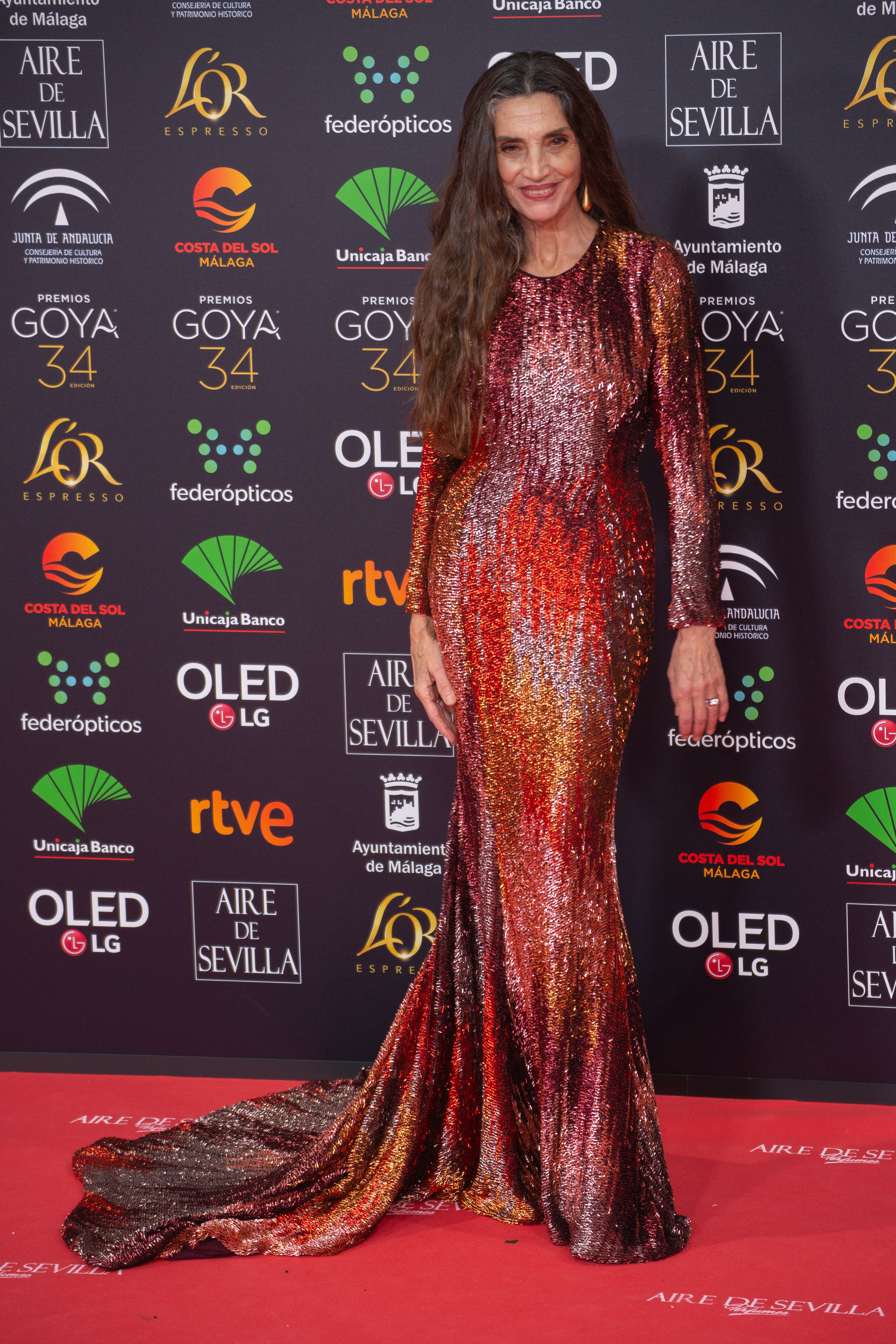
- Molina in 2020
- Born: Ángela Molina Tejedor; 5 October 1955 (age 71); Madrid, Spain
- Occupation: Actress
- Years active: 1975–present
- Children: 5, including Olivia
- Father: Antonio Molina
- Relatives: Mónica Molina (sister)

Ángela Molina Tejedor (born 5 October 1955) is a Spanish actress. Aside from her performances in Spanish films, she has starred in multiple international productions, particularly in a number of Italian films and television series.

== Family ==
Molina was born in Madrid on 5 October 1955, the daughter of singer Antonio Molina and Ángela Tejedor. Her siblings Paula, Mónica and Miki have also pursued an acting career. Another of her siblings, Noel, is a composer.

== Career ==
She studied dance and theatre art in the Escuela Superior de Madrid. She made her film debut in 1975 with César Fernández Ardavín's No matarás. Another early major credit is her performance as Rosa (a sexually provocative woman and unwed mother) in Black Brood (1977), a film portraying fascist violence in post-Francoist Spain. She rose to international prominence after starring in Luis Buñuel's last film That Obscure Object of Desire (1977).

She has worked with such directors as Luis Buñuel, the Taviani brothers, Jaime Chávarri, Pedro Almodóvar, Fernando Colomo, Jaime Camino, José Luis Borau, Manuel Gutiérrez Aragón, Giuseppe Tornatore, Bigas Luna, Alain Tanner, Julio Medem, Ridley Scott, Lina Wertmüller, Luigi Comencini, Sergio Castellitto and Jaime de Armiñán.

In 1985, she became the first foreign actress to win the Italian cinematographic David di Donatello prize for her role in Lina Wertmüller's Camorra. She was awarded the prize for Best Actress at the Donostia-San Sebastian International Film Festival in 1987 for her role in Half of Heaven. She was also repeatedly nominated for the Goya Awards (Spanish cinematographic awards).

In 1999, she was the Head of the Jury at the 49th Berlin International Film Festival.

She was awarded with the Gold Medal of Merit in the Fine Arts in 2002 and the Spanish National Prize of Cinematography in 2016.

== Selected filmography ==
=== Film ===
Key
†	Denotes films that have not yet been released

Year	Title	Role	Notes	Ref.
1974	No matarás			
1975	No quiero perder la honra			
1975	Las protegidas			
1976	La ciutat cremada (The Burned City)	Roser Palau		
1976	Las largas vacaciones del 36 (The Long Vacation of '36)	Encarna		
1977	Viva/muera Don Juan Tenorio			
1977	Nunca es tarde (It's Never Too Late)			
1977	Camada negra (Black Brood)	Rosa		
1977	Ese oscuro objeto del deseo (That Obscure Object of Desire)	Conchita	Character also played by Carole Bouquet	
1977	A un dios desconocido (To an Unknown God)	Soledad		
1978	La portentosa vida del padre Vicente (The Prodigious Life of Father Vincent)	María		
1978	El hombre que supo amar (The Man Who Knew Love)	Jazmin		
1979	El corazón del bosque (Heart of the Forest)	Amparo		
1979	Operación Ogro (Ogro)	Amaiur		
1979	L'ingorgo, una storia impossibile (Traffic Jam)	Martina		
1979	Buone notizie (Good News)	Fedora		
1979	La Sabina	Pepa		
1980	Kaltgestellt (Put on Ice)	Franziska		
1982	Gli occhi, la bocca (The Eyes, the Mouth)	Wanda		
1982	Demonios en el jardín (Demons in the Garden)	Ángela		
1983	Bearn o la sala de las muñecas	Xima		
1985	Un complicato intrigo di donne, vicoli e delitti (Camorra (A Story of Streets, Women and Crime))	Annunziata		
1985	Fuego eterno (Eternal Fire)	Gabrielle		
1986	La sposa era bellissima (The Bride Was Beautiful)	Maria		
1986	Streets of Gold	Elena		
1986	El río de oro	Laura		
1986	Lola	Lola		
1986	La mitad del cielo (Half of Heaven)	Rosa	Young Rosa played by Mónica Molina	
1987	Laura a la ciutat dels sants	Laura		
1988	Luces y sombras (Lights and Shadows)	Charo		
1988	Via Paradiso	Giulia		
1989	Barroco	Sefardita		
1989	Esquilache	Fernandita		
1989	Las cosas del querer (The Things of Love)	Pepita		
1989	La Sabina (Sabina)	Pepa		
1990	Volevo i pantaloni	Zia Vannina		
1990	Los ángeles (Angels)	Natacha		
1990	Sandino	Teresa Villatoro		
1991	Le voleur d'enfants (The Children Thief)	Despossoria		
1992	Una mujer bajo la lluvia (A Woman in the Rain)	Mercedes		
1992	1492: Conquest of Paradise	Beatriz Enríquez de Arana		
1993	Mal de amores	Carmen		
1994	El baile de las ánimas	Adela		
1994	Con gli occhi chiusi (With Closed Eyes)	Rebecca		
1995	Las cosas del querer 2	Pepita	Reprise of role in Las cosas del querer	
1995	¡Oh, cielos!	Silvia		
1995	Gimlet	Julia		
1996	Edipo alcalde (Oedipus Mayor)	Yocasta		
1997	Carne trémula (Live Flesh)	Clara		
1998	El viento se llevó lo qué (Wind with the Gone)	Doña María		
2000	One of the Hollywood Ten	Rosaura Revueltas		
2000	El mar (The Sea)	Carmen Onaindia		
2001	Malefemmene (Bad Women)	Nunzia		
2002	Piedras (Stones)	Isabel		
2002	Carnages (Carnage)			
2003	Al sur de Granada (South from Granada)	Doña Felicidad		
2006	El triunfo	Chata		
2006	Los Borgia (The Borgia)	Vanozza Cattanei		
2006	La sconosciuta (The Unknown Woman)	Lucrezia		
2006	La caja (The Wooden Box)	Eloisa		
2007	La masseria delle allodole (The Lark Farm)	Ismene		
2008	14, Fabian Road	Palmira		
2008	Diario de una ninfómana (Diary of a Nymphomaniac)	Cristina		
2009	Baarìa	Sarina		
2009	Los abrazos rotos (Broken Embraces)	Madre de Lena		
2009	Barbarossa	Hildegard von Bingen		
2010	The Way	Angelica		
2010	Carne de neón (Neon Flesh)	Pura		
2010	Vidas pequeñas (Small Lives)	Celeste		
2012	Blancanieves (Snow White)	Doña Concha		
2012	Miel de naranjas (Orange Honey)	María		
2012	Memoria de mis putas tristes	Casilda (old)	Young version of Casilda Armenia played by Olivia Molina	
2015	Nessuno si salva da solo (You Can't Save Yourself Alone)	Lea		
2016	Tini: El gran cambio de Violetta (Tini: The Movie)	Isabella		
2017	El otro hermano (The Lost Brother)	Marta		
2017	El último traje (The Last Suit)	María		
2018	El árbol de la sangre (The Tree of Blood)	Julieta		
2018	The Man Who Bought the Moon	Teresa		
2019	Me llamo Gennet	Pilar Gómez		
2021	Charlotte	Charlotte		
2022	La piedad (Piety)	Libertad		
2023	The Order of Time			
2024	Yo no soy esa			
2024	The Return	Eurycleia		
2024	Polvo serán (They Will Be Dust)	Claudia		
2024	Le Dernier Souffle (Last Breath)	Estrella		
TBA	Ana no †	Ana Paucha		

Other

- Tre giorni di Natale (2019)
- Nowhere (2002)
- Anna's Summer (2001)
- Sagitario (2001)
- Jara (2000)
- Daughter of Her Son (2000)
- Trouble in Love (1993)
- Poor Jorge (1993)
- Krapatchouk (1992)
- The Man Who Lost His Shadow (1991)
- Drums of Fire (1990)
- Black River (1990)
- The Savage (1989)
- Bras de fer (1985)
- Dies rigorose Leben (1983)
- The Remains from the Shipwreck (1978)

=== Television ===
Year	Title	Role	Notes	Ref
1985	Quo Vadis?	Acte	Miniseries	
2006	The Holy Family			
2010–2013	Gran Reserva	Sofía Ruiz de Reverte		
2020	La valla (The Barrier)	Emilia Noval		
2022	A Private Affair	Doña Asuncion		

== Awards and nominations ==
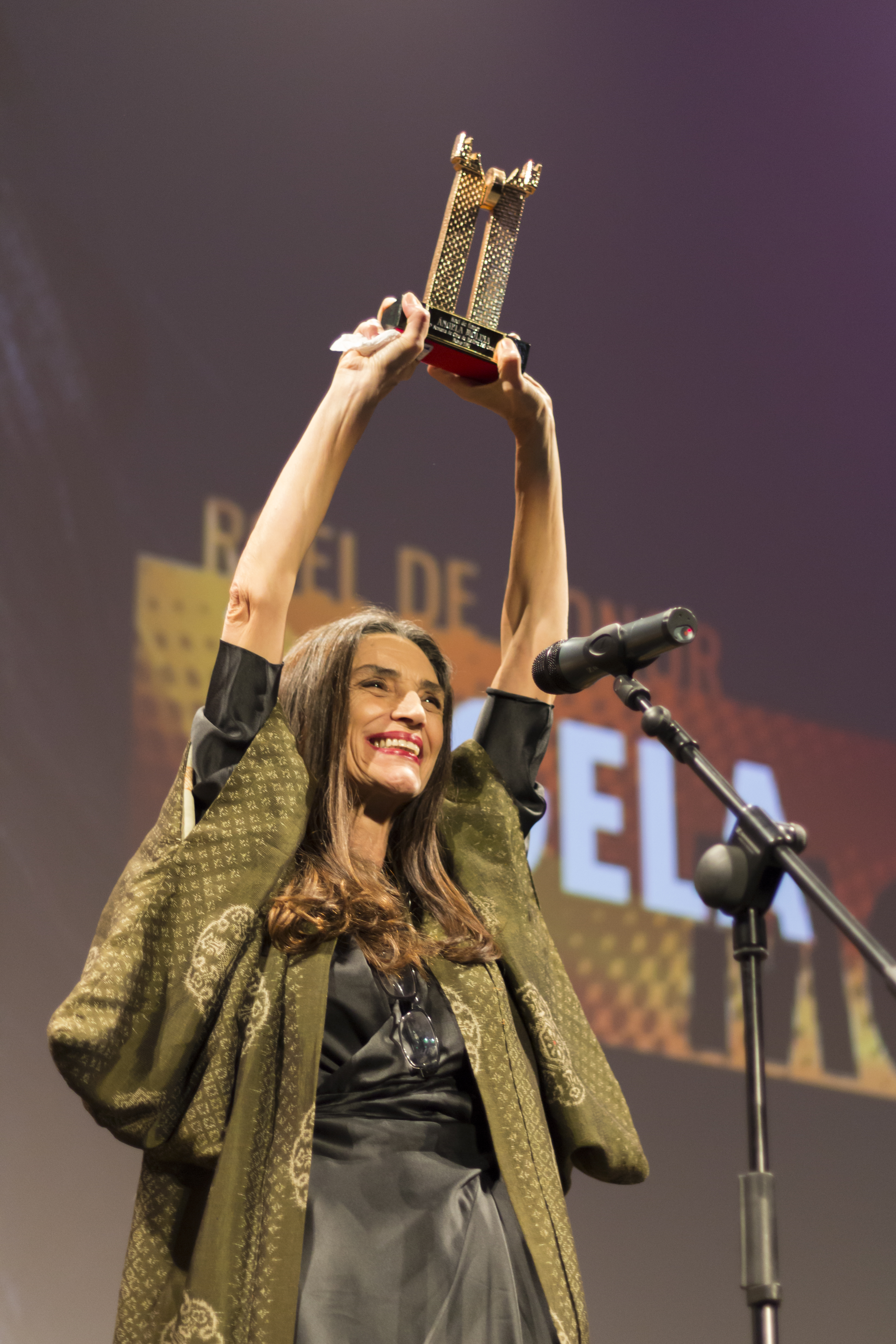
Molina holding a trophy during the 30th International Medina del Campo Film Week in 2017

Year	Award ceremony	Category	Work	Result	Ref.
1986	31st David di Donatello Awards	Best Actress	Camorra	Won	
1987	1st Goya Awards	Best Actress	Half of Heaven	Nominated	
1989	3rd Goya Awards	Best Actress	Luces y sombras	Nominated	
1990	4th Goya Awards	Best Actress	The Things of Love	Nominated	
1998	12th Goya Awards	Best Supporting Actress	Live Flesh	Nominated	
2013	5th Gaudí Awards	Best Actress	Snow White	Nominated	
2013	68th CEC Medals	Best Supporting Actress	Snow White	Won	
2013	27th Goya Awards	Best Supporting Actress	Snow White	Nominated	
2013	22nd Actors and Actresses Union Awards	Best Film Actress in a Secondary Role	Snow White	Nominated	
2021	35th Goya Awards	Honorary Goya Award	—N/a	Won	
2021	52nd International Film Festival of India	IFFI Best Actor Award (Female)	Charlotte	Won	
2022	9th Platino Awards	Best Actress	Charlotte	Nominated	
2023	2nd Carmen Awards	Best Actress	Piety	Nominated	
2024	19th Rome Film Festival	Best Actress	They Will Be Dust	Won	
2025	17th Gaudí Awards	Best Actress	They Will Be Dust	Nominated	
