= A Gun in Each Hand =

- Film poster
- Spanish: Una pistola en cada mano
- Directed by: Cesc Gay
- Screenplay by: Tomàs Aragay; Cesc Gay
- Produced by: Marta Esteban
- Starring: Javier Cámara; Ricardo Darín; Eduard Fernández; Jordi Mollà; Eduardo Noriega; Alberto San Juan; Leonardo Sbaraglia; Luis Tosar; Cayetana Guillén Cuervo; Candela Peña; Clara Segura; Leonor Watling
- Cinematography: Andreu Rebés
- Production company: Impossible Films
- Distributed by: Filmax
- Release dates: 17 November 2012 (Rome); 5 December 2012 (Spain)
- Country: Spain
- Language: Spanish

A Gun in Each Hand (Spanish: Una pistola en cada mano) is a 2012 Spanish comedy film directed by Cesc Gay.

== Cast ==
- Javier Cámara as S.
- Ricardo Darín as G.
- Eduard Fernández as E.
- Jordi Mollà as M.
- Eduardo Noriega as P.
- Leonor Watling as Maria
- Alberto San Juan as A.
- Leonardo Sbaraglia as J.
- Luis Tosar as L.
- Cayetana Guillén Cuervo as Sara
- Candela Peña as Mamen
- Clara Segura as Elena

== Production ==
A Gun in Each Hand is an Impossible Films production, with the participation of TVE, TVC, Canal+ and support from ICAA, and ICEC. The screenplay was penned by Gay alongside recurring co-scribe Tomas Aragay. Marta Esteban took over production duties whereas Andreu Rebés worked as cinematographer.

== Release ==
The film was selected for screening as the closing film of the 7th Rome Film Festival on 17 November 2012. Distributed by Filmax, it was theatrically released on 5 December 2012.

== Reception ==
Jonathan Holland of Variety deemed the film to be a "a witty, perceptive dissection of midlife masculine insecurities that’s all about dialogue and what some fine thesps can do with it".

== Accolades ==
Year	Award	Category	Nominee(s)	Result	Ref.
2013	5th Gaudí Awards	Best Non-Catalan language Film		Won	
2013	5th Gaudí Awards	Best Director	Cesc Gay	Nominated	
2013	5th Gaudí Awards	Best Screenplay	Tomàs Aragay, Cesc Gay	Won	
2013	5th Gaudí Awards	Best Supporting Actress	Candela Peña	Won	
2013	5th Gaudí Awards	Best Supporting Actor	Eduard Fernández	Won	
2013	5th Gaudí Awards	Best Costume Design	Anna Güell	Nominated	
2013	27th Goya Awards	Best Supporting Actress	Candela Peña	Nominated	
2013	22nd Actors and Actresses Union Awards	Best Film Actress in a Secondary Role	Candela Peña	Won	
2013	22nd Actors and Actresses Union Awards	Best Film Actor in a Secondary Role	Eduard Fernández	Nominated	

== See also ==
- List of Spanish films of 2012
