= List of Spanish films of the 2010s =

Films produced in Spain in the 2010s ordered by year of release on separate pages:

== List of films by year ==
- Spanish films of 2010
- Spanish films of 2011
- Spanish films of 2012
- Spanish films of 2013
- Spanish films of 2014
- Spanish films of 2015
- Spanish films of 2016
- Spanish films of 2017
- Spanish films of 2018
- Spanish films of 2019
