= Fragments (2025 film) =

Spanish drama film

- Theatrical release poster
- Spanish: Fragmentos
- Directed by: Horacio Alcalá
- Screenplay by: Frank Ariza
- Produced by: Francisco E. Cordero; Carmen Aguado; Frank Ariza
- Starring: Emma Suárez; Manu Vega; Asia Ortega; Sonia Almarcha; José Luis García Pérez
- Cinematography: Elías M. Félix
- Edited by: Pablo Gómez-Pan
- Music by: María Vértiz
- Production company: La Noria Producciones
- Distributed by: AF Pictures
- Release dates: September 2025 (Zinemaldia); 12 December 2025 (Spain)
- Running time: 91 minutes
- Country: Spain
- Language: Spanish

Fragments (Spanish: Fragmentos) is a 2025 Spanish drama film directed by Horacio Alcalá and written by Frank Ariza. It stars Emma Suárez, Manu Vega, Asia Ortega, and José Luis García Pérez.

== Plot ==
The married and deeply damaged couple formed by Alba and Diego embark on a trip to an isolated resort run by an older couple (Irene and Ben) whose stability also begins to crumble when they cross paths.

== Cast ==
- Manu Vega as Diego
- Asia Ortega as Alba
- Emma Suárez as Irene
- José Luis García Pérez as Ben
- Sonia Almarcha as Anna
- Ciro Miró as Aarón

== Production ==
The film was produced by La Noria Producciones, with the association of AF Films, BTF Media, Match Point, and E-Media Canary Project. It was shot in Lanzarote with Elías M. Félix working as director of photography.

== Release ==
Fragments premiered in the 'Made in Spain' section of the 73rd San Sebastián International Film Festival. Distributed by AF Pictures, it was released theatrically in Spain on 12 December 2025.

== Reception ==
Pere Vall of Fotogramas rated the film 3 out of 5 stars praising the leading four cast members and the original gaze to the landscape but questioning about the ability to connect with the slow pace of the film.

Enid Román Almansa of Cinemanía rated the film 4 out of 5 stars, writing that the four leads "are equally unsettling and mesmerizing with every glance".

== See also ==
- List of Spanish films of 2025
