= Nothing Personal (2025 film) =

- Spanish: A la cara
- Directed by: Javier Marco
- Screenplay by: Javier Marco; Belén Sánchez-Arévalo
- Based on: A la cara (short film) by Belén Sánchez-Arévalo
- Starring: Sonia Almarcha; Manolo Solo
- Cinematography: Anna Franquesa-Solano
- Music by: Margaret Hermant
- Production companies: Pecado Films; LaCima Producciones; Odessa Films; Langosta Films; Biograf Capital AIE
- Distributed by: Sideral Cinema
- Release dates: 17 November 2025 (FICX); 22 May 2026 (Spain)
- Country: Spain
- Language: Spanish

Nothing Personal or Face to Face (Spanish: A la cara) is a 2025 drama film directed by Javier Marco and co-written by Belén Sánchez-Arévalo based on the short film of the same name. It stars Sonia Almarcha and Manolo Solo.

== Plot ==
Exploring the issue of hateful content on social media, the plot tracks the meeting between online hater Pedro and the popular female television presenter targeted by him (Lina), as the woman presents at Pedro's residence by surprise asking for explanations for what he wrote about her on social media.

== Cast ==
- Manolo Solo
- Sonia Almarcha
- Roberto Álamo
- Daniel Pérez Prada
- Helena Zumel

== Production ==
Expanding on the short film of the same name, the picture was produced by Pecado Films, LaCima Producciones, Odessa Films, Langosta Films, and Biograf Capital AIE, with the participation of À Punt, and financial backing from ICAA, IVC, the Madrid regional administration, and Creative Europe MEDIA. It was shot in the Madrid region and Castilla–La Mancha, including Casarrubios del Monte. It was lensed by Anna Franquesa-Solano.

== Release ==
The film had its world premiere in the 'Albar' main competition section of the 63rd Gijón International Film Festival (FICX) on 17 November 2025. Distributed by Sideral Cinema, it is scheduled to be released theatrically in Spain on 22 May 2026.

== Reception ==
Toni Vall of Cinemanía wrote that the films results into "a stunning chamber piece about the hiding places of loneliness, [the] pain that is impossible to swallow, guilt, and the terror of facing reality".

Javier Ocaña of El País wrote that "the harshness of the inner lives and behaviour of its two protagonists take the film into the raw and sombre realm of Fernando Franco's films".

Manuel J. Lombardo of Diario de Sevilla gave the film a 3-star rating, assessing that Almarcha and Solo bodily carry the film, "that navigates its obstacles with ease, giving substance to the pain, breathing life into the silent emotion and opening the door to redemption".

Alfonso Rivera of Cineuropa noted that the film "feels at times static, claustrophobic and repetitive", otherwise comparing the lead actors' face-off to Michael Caine and Laurence Olivier in Sleuth.

== Accolades ==
Year	Award	Category	Nominee(s)	Result	Ref.
2025	8th Lola Gaos Awards	Best Actress	Sonia Almarcha	Nominated	
2025	8th Lola Gaos Awards	Best Supporting Actor	Roberto Álamo	Nominated	

== See also ==
- List of Spanish films of 2026
