= Hugo 24 =

- Theatrical release poster
- Directed by: Luc Knowles
- Written by: Luc Knowles
- Starring: Arón Piper; Marco Cáceres; Marta Etura; Greta Fernández; Javier Pereira
- Cinematography: Iván Sánchez
- Edited by: Rocío Pérez
- Music by: Hernán González; Gabriel Casacuberta; Álex de Lucas
- Production companies: Clapham Films; RV Entertainment; Dadá Films; Lágrima Films; NonStop Studios; Caramel Films
- Distributed by: Caramel Films
- Release dates: 8 March 2026 (Málaga); 15 May 2026 (Spain)
- Country: Spain
- Language: Spanish

Hugo 24 is a 2026 Spanish thriller drama film written and directed by Luc Knowles. It stars Arón Piper along with Marco Cáceres, Marta Etura, Greta Fernández, and Javier Pereira.

== Plot ==
Taking place over the course of 24 hours in Tetuán, 24 year-old Hugo rushes to gather the money for the rent with the help of his best friend and thus avoid his and his sister's eviction, while navigating the relationship with his new girlfriend.

== Cast ==
- Arón Piper as Hugo
- Marco Cáceres
- Marta Etura
- Greta Fernández
- Javier Pereira

== Production ==
The film was produced by Clapham Films, RV Entertainment, Dadá Films, Lágrima Films, NonStop Studios, and Caramel Films. Shooting locations in Tetuán included Calle de Teruel (Cuatro Caminos).

== Release ==
Cast and crew members attending the 2026 Málaga Film Festival

The film was presented on 8 March 2026 at the 29th Málaga Film Festival, in an out of competition official selection slot. Distributed by Caramel Films, it is scheduled to be released theatrically in Spain on 15 May 2026.

The film's international festival run included a selection for screening at the 42nd Warsaw International Film Festival.

== Reception ==
Pere Vall of Fotogramas rated the film 4 out of 5 stars, highlighting "an excellent cast; [the] vibrant production; [and] a blend of drama and lyricism" as the best things about the film.

Javier Ocaña of El País assessed that the film possesses "a certain tenderness that suits the story well", "but it never quite captures the true spirit of the street".

== See also ==
- List of Spanish films of 2026
