= Red Lights (2012 film) =

2012 film by Rodrigo Cortés

- Theatrical release poster
- Directed by: Rodrigo Cortés
- Written by: Rodrigo Cortés
- Produced by: Rodrigo Cortés; Adrian Guerra
- Starring: Cillian Murphy; Sigourney Weaver; Robert De Niro; Toby Jones; Joely Richardson; Elizabeth Olsen; Leonardo Sbaraglia
- Cinematography: Xavi Giménez
- Edited by: Rodrigo Cortés
- Music by: Victor Reyes
- Production companies: Nostromo Pictures; Cindy Cowan Entertainment; Antena 3 Films; Televisió de Catalunya
- Distributed by: Millennium Entertainment (United States); Warner Bros. Pictures (Spain)
- Release dates: 20 January 2012 (Sundance); 2 March 2012 (Spain); 13 July 2012 (United States)
- Running time: 114 minutes
- Countries: Spain; United States
- Language: English
- Budget: €14 million
- Box office: $14.1 million

Red Lights is a 2012 psychological supernatural thriller film written, directed, produced and edited by Rodrigo Cortés and starring Cillian Murphy, Sigourney Weaver, Robert De Niro, Toby Jones, Joely Richardson and Elizabeth Olsen. The plot focuses on a physicist (Murphy) and a university psychology professor (Weaver), both of whom specialise in debunking supernatural phenomena, and their attempt at discrediting a renowned psychic (De Niro) whose greatest critic mysteriously died 30 years prior.

The film premiered at the Sundance Film Festival in January 2012, and received a limited release in the United States on 13 July 2012.

== Plot ==
University professor and psychologist Margaret Matheson and her assistant Tom Buckley, a physicist, investigate claims of paranormal phenomena. They observe a seance and later debunk the tricks used by the pretend psychic. At the same time, famous blind psychic Simon Silver announces he will begin performing again. Silver spent decades away from the limelight after his most vocal skeptical critic died suddenly while confronting Silver at one of his performances. The news garners lots of media attention and Silver begins making television appearances to promote his shows.

Buckley suggests that he and Matheson, along with fellow skeptic and eager student Sally Owen, go after Silver, but Matheson is against the idea. Instead, they monitor the performance of a "faith healer" and former student of Silver's and, by using sophisticated surveillance equipment, are able to expose him as a fraud who uses an earpiece and is fed information from assistants elsewhere in the theater. Buckley suggests they go after Silver next but Matheson again rebuffs him, admitting that years prior she had tried to expose Silver only to be left shaken when Silver seemed to contact her comatose son. Frustrated, Buckley attempts to monitor Silver's show on his own with the same equipment as before, but his attempt is immediately noticed by Silver and the equipment mysteriously breaks down. Buckley returns to Matheson only to find her collapsed on the floor. She dies shortly after from a chronic vascular disease.

Following Matheson's death, Buckley becomes increasingly obsessed with investigating Silver, but his efforts are interrupted by a series of seemingly inexplicable events; electronic devices explode, dead birds keep appearing, and Buckley's laboratory is vandalized. As the media frenzy continues, Silver agrees to participate in an investigation proposed by an academic from the same university that employed Matheson, even though she previously pointed out flaws in their testing methods. Buckley joins the observation team but is not allowed to participate in the tests and can only review recorded footage with his assistants. Though most results are inconclusive, one test, which uses two isolation booths in an attempt to record telepathy, shows Silver succeeding at a rate far beyond random chance. The results of the testing seem to confirm that Silver has genuine psychic powers, and Shackleton is set to publish these findings prior to Silver's final show.

An increasingly agitated Buckley attends the show while his assistants continue to review the footage of Silver's testing. After being spotted in the crowd, Buckley is brutally beaten in the bathroom during intermission by one of Silver's assistants. At the same time, Sally discovers Silver and the person in the other isolation booth were wearing perfectly synchronized analog watches and using a pattern based on the time to cheat the telepathy test. Additionally, she determines that Silver is faking his blindness as he never touches his watch's hands to check the time.

Bloodied and pushed to his limit, Buckley storms the auditorium to confront Silver. As the two argue, more electrical disturbances occur and the stage begins to shake. However, Silver is confused by the occurrences and it is revealed Buckley is telekinetic and the destruction around him has been a side effect of his emotional state. Buckley reveals that he has been working as a paranormal debunker in hopes of finding someone else like him or another explanation. Buckley tosses a coin at Silver's face, which he instinctively catches, revealing to the audience that he can see.

Buckley leaves the theater, and through narration expresses regret for not telling Matheson the truth about his abilities while she was alive, as it could have comforted her to know that "there is more." Hoping she and her son can be together again in death, Buckley goes to the hospital and turns off the life-support machine that is keeping Matheson's son alive. As he does, he admits to himself that he can't deny what he is forever.

== Cast ==
- Cillian Murphy as Thomas "Tom" Buckley
- Sigourney Weaver as Margaret Matheson
- Robert De Niro as Simon Silver
- Joely Richardson as Monica Handsen
- Elizabeth Olsen as Sally Owen
- Craig Roberts as Ben
- Toby Jones as Dr Paul Shackleton
- Burn Gorman as Benedict Cosell
- Garrick Hagon as Howard McColm
- Leonardo Sbaraglia as Leonardo "Leo" Palladino
- Lynn Blades as Dana
- Jeany Spark as Traci Northrop
- Julius Cotter as Dr. Jennings
- Adriane Lenox as Rina

== Production ==
=== Development ===
Cortés spent a year and a half researching and writing the screenplay, studying both sides of the psychic powers issue offered by skeptics and believers. He came to the conclusion that some on each side exclude evidence that does not support their position. He further stated that he does not intend Red Lights to represent his own position on the subject, as it is just an entertainment movie; however, he personally does not believe in the supernatural (ghosts, demons, etc.) because, in his view, nothing can exceed natural laws, but the paranormal (psychic powers, etc.), which he differentiates from the supernatural, could be phenomena in some cases for which science has yet to find an explanation.

He scripted the character of skeptical psychologist Margaret Matheson specifically with actress Sigourney Weaver in mind for the role, but with no advance commitment from her, though to his relief, she did sign on to the project after reading the script.

Robert De Niro researched and met with psychics for his role and developed the cautious belief that there is something to the phenomenon based on allegedly psychically obtained information they were able to tell him that he insists only he knew: "There's no way they could have known certain things and they said them, so in that sense, I have no answer than to say that I have to believe that there's something there that they pick up psychically. I don't know what it is".

=== Filming ===
Filming occurred in Spain and Canada, with ten of the filming locations based in Barcelona, Spain; a week of filming was undertaken at the Fairmont Royal York in Toronto, Canada and significant shots were taken on James Street North in nearby Hamilton, Canada. The filming process for Red Lights commenced in February 2011 and concluded in April 2011.

== Release ==
=== Critical reception ===
Red Lights received mainly negative reviews from critics. The review aggregator website Rotten Tomatoes reported that 30% of critics have given the film a positive review based on 91 reviews, with an average rating of 4.85/10. The site's critics consensus reads, "Wasting the talents of an impressive cast on a predictable mystery, Red Lights lacks the clairvoyance to know what audiences want." On Metacritic, the film has a weighted average score of 36 out of 100 based on 22 critics, indicating "generally unfavorable reviews".

In The New York Times, Jeannette Catsoulis praised the early section of the film for its "smart, talky screenplay and tense direction," but criticized the end for being "derailed by elaborate pyrotechnics and a bathroom brawl."

Michael Nordine of Slant Magazine gave the film one and a half stars out of a possible four, and wrote, "Red Lights implodes so spectacularly that it’s almost worth the price of admission." Similarly to Catsoulis, Nordine wrote positively of film's first hour, but concluded, "its official jumping-the-shark moment is so jarringly ill-conceived as to immediately erase nearly every trace of good faith Cortés has thus far inspired."

William Goss gave a more positive review in IndieWire, writing, "while Red Lights isn’t terrifically scary, it is thrilling in other ways, constantly playful and often tongue-in-cheek as it works through the hokey conventions of the genre." Yet, Goss believed that the ending "[would] divide audiences." He compared Red Lights' tone to Scanners, Unbreakable, and The Prestige.

For Vulture, Bilge Ebiri gave the film a negative review, writing that it was "a genre film that aspires to so much more...even as it flounders in its own silliness," and that "Red Lights borders on so-bad-it’s-good-ness in a way that makes you wonder if it might be an intentional goof," but he ultimately found it "merely exhausting."
