= Alexander Witt =

Chilean film director and cinematographer (b. 1952)

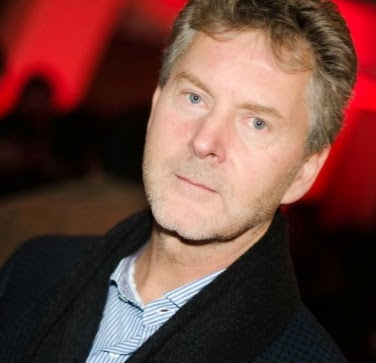
- Witt in 2016
- Born: April 10, 1952 (age 74); Santiago, Chile
- Occupations: Film director, cinematographer

Alexander B. Witt, ASC, ACC (born 1952) is a Chilean film director and cinematographer. He is primarily known for his second unit work, and has frequently collaborated with director Ridley Scott.

== Life and career ==
Witt was born in Santiago in 1952, to German Chilean parents. He was raised in Chile and Mexico, and in 1973 he moved to Munich, West Germany to work at Arri. "I was there for a year and I did kind of a trainee type of year where I was in the sound department, in the lab, in the studio working with the actual productions and also assembling cameras."

Witt's first film credit was as a camera assistant on the German-shot American television film 21 Hours at Munich. He worked as a focus puller and camera assistant for Jan de Bont, and in the late 1980s moved to the United States. Starting in the late 1980s, he began shooting and directing commercials.

Witt works mostly as a second unit director and cinematographer and has worked on a plethora of films ranging from Gladiator to Cinderella. He is a frequent collaborator of director Ridley Scott, and served as the director of photography on his 2008 film Body of Lies. He made his directorial debut in 2004 with the video game adaptation Resident Evil: Apocalypse. Witt also served as the second unit director on the James Bond films Casino Royale (2006), Skyfall (2012), Spectre (2015) and No Time to Die (2020).

He was a member of the jury of the 2012 Santiago International Film Festival.

He is a member of the American Society of Cinematographers (ASC) and the Chilean Society of Cinematographers (ACC).

== Filmography ==
Key
†	Denotes titles that have not yet been released

=== Director ===
- Resident Evil: Apocalypse (2004)
- Sayen (2023)
- Sayen: Desert Road (2023)
- Sayen: The Huntress (2024)

=== Cinematographer ===
- Die Nacht des Schicksals (1981, dir. Helmer von Lützelburg)
- Body of Lies (2008, dir. Ridley Scott)
- The Border (2022, dir. Jayro Bustamante)

=== Second unit ===
Year	Title	Functioned as		Director	Notes
Year	Title	2nd unit director	2nd unit DoP	Director	Notes
1985	The Jewel of the Nile	No	Yes	Lewis Teague	
1990	The Hunt for Red October	No	Yes	John McTiernan	
1992	Lethal Weapon 3	No	Yes	Richard Donner	
1992	Chaplin	No	Yes	Richard Attenborough	as 'Alex Witt'
1994	Speed	Yes	No	Jan De Bont	
1995	Money Train	Yes	Yes	Joseph Ruben	New York unit
1996	Twister	Yes	Yes	Jan De Bont	
1997	Speed 2: Cruise Control	Yes	Yes	Jan De Bont	
1997	The Postman	Yes	No	Kevin Costner	
1998	The X-Files	Yes	Yes	Rob Bowman	Creature unit
1999	Forces of Nature	Yes	Yes	Bronwen Hughes	
1999	Inspector Gadget	Yes	Yes	David Kellogg	Uncredited
2000	Gladiator	Yes	Yes	Ridley Scott	
2000	Remember the Titans	Yes	Yes	Boaz Yakin	
2001	Hannibal	Yes	Yes	Ridley Scott	
2001	Black Hawk Down	Yes	No	Ridley Scott	
2002	The Bourne Identity	Yes	Yes	Doug Liman	
2002	XXX	Yes	Yes	Rob Cohen	
2003	Daredevil	Yes	Yes	Mark Steven Johnson	
2003	The Italian Job	Yes	No	F. Gary Gray	
2003	Hollywood Homicide	Yes	Yes	Ron Shelton	Additional photography
2003	Pirates of the Caribbean: The Curse of the Black Pearl	Yes	Yes	Gore Verbinski	
2004	Hidalgo	Yes	No	Joe Johnston	
2005	Æon Flux	Yes	No	Karyn Kusama	
2006	She's the Man	Yes	No	Andy Fickman	
2006	Casino Royale	Yes	Yes	Martin Campbell	
2007	American Gangster	Yes	Yes	Ridley Scott	
2008	Fool's Gold	Yes	No	Andy Tennant	
2009	The Taking of Pelham 123	Yes	Yes	Tony Scott	
2010	Prince of Persia: The Sands of Time	Yes	Yes	Mike Newell	
2010	Robin Hood	Yes	Yes	Ridley Scott	
2010	The Town	Yes	Yes	Ben Affleck	
2011	Fast Five	Yes	Yes	Justin Lin	Train heist sequence
2011	X-Men: First Class	Yes	Yes	Matthew Vaughn	
2012	Safe House	Yes	Yes	Daniel Espinosa	
2012	Skyfall	Yes	Yes	Sam Mendes	
2012	Code Name Oracle	Yes	No	Max Bartoli	
2014	Hercules	Yes	Yes	Brett Ratner	
2015	Cinderella	Yes	Yes	Kenneth Branagh	
2015	Terminator Genisys	Yes	Yes	Alan Taylor	
2015	Spectre	Yes	Yes	Sam Mendes	
2017	First They Killed My Father	No	Yes	Angelina Jolie	
2018	Avengers: Infinity War	Yes	Yes	Anthony and Joe Russo	
2018	Bird Box	Yes	Yes	Susanne Bier	
2021	No Time to Die	Yes	Yes	Cary Joji Fukunaga	
2021	Jungle Cruise	Yes	Yes	Jaume Collet-Serra	
2023	Fast X	Yes	Yes	Louis Leterrier	
2023	Ferrari	Yes	Yes	Michael Mann	
2027	The Legend of Zelda †	Yes	Yes	Wes Ball	Post-production
