= Sonia Almarcha =

Spanish actress (born 1972)

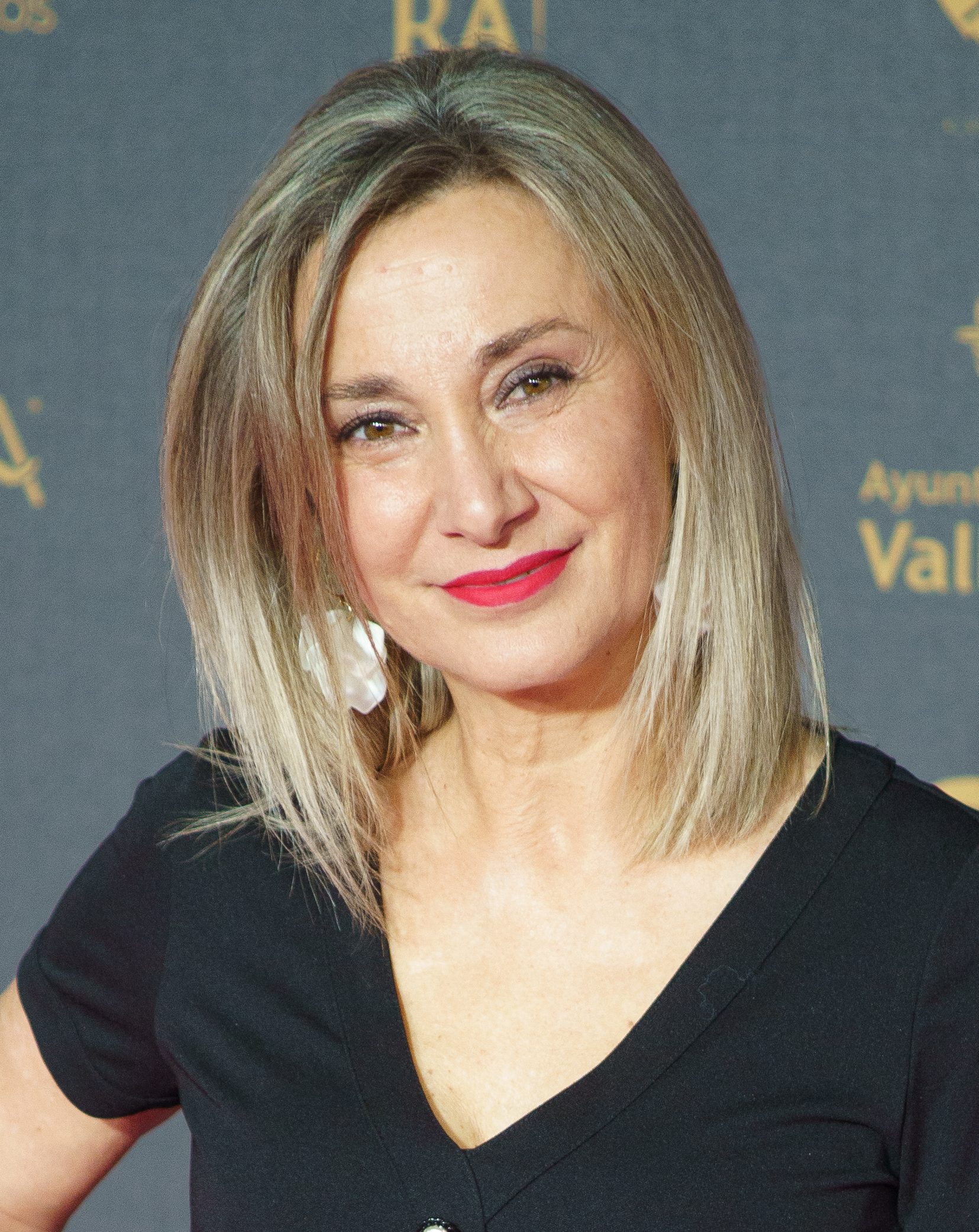
- Almarcha in 2024
- Born: 1972 (age 53–54); Pinoso, Spain
- Occupation: Actress

Sonia Almarcha (born 1972) is a Spanish actress.

== Early life and education ==
Born in Pinoso, province of Alicante, in 1972, Almarcha studied at and graduated from Valencia's Dramatic Art School (1986–1989). She further trained as an actress at the William Layton lab, also taking diverse acting courses.

== Career ==
She landed her television debut role in 1995 in the series ¡Ay, Señor, Señor!, and her debut in a feature film in the 1996 film Suburbs.

Her film performance in Jaime Rosales' Solitary Fragments (2007) earned her a Best New Actress award at the 17th Actors and Actresses Union Awards.

For her work in Orson West, where she played a lead actress returning to her birthplace, she earned a nomination for Best Film Actress in a Leading Role at the 22nd Actors and Actresses Union Awards.

== Filmography ==
=== Television ===
| Year | Title | Role | Notes | Ref. |
|---|---|---|---|---|
| 2006–07 | Génesis: en la mente del asesino | Laura | | |
| 2010 | Acusados | Teresa Llorente | Introduced in season 2 | |
| 2011 | Crematorio | Lola | | |
| 2014 | Hermanos | Jimena Olmedo | | |
| 2015 | Vis a vis (Locked Up) | Lidia | | |
| 2017–18 | Amar es para siempre | Matilde Velázquez | Introduced in season 6 | |
| 2021 | Reyes de la noche | Almudena | | |
| 2022 | Heridas (Wounds) | Olga Escudero | Supporting character | |
| 2024 | La ley del mar (The Law of the Sea) | Pepi | | |

=== Film ===
| Year | Title | Role | Notes | Ref. |
|---|---|---|---|---|
| 2004 | Muertos comunes (Common Dead) | Charo | Also casting director | |
| 2007 | La soledad (Solitary Fragments) | Adela | | |
| 2010 | Amador | Yolanda | | |
| 2018 | El reino (The Realm) | Susana | | |
| 2019 | La innocència (The Innocence) | Remedios Naturales | | |
| 2021 | El buen patrón (The Good Boss) | Adela | | |
| 2024 | Marco, la verdad inventada (Marco, the Invented Truth) | Clara | | |
| 2024 | El llanto (The Wailing) | Mercedes | | |
| 2025 | V/H/S/Halloween | Jueza | Segement: "Ut Supra Sic Infra" | |
| 2025 | Fragmentos (Fragments) | Anna | | |
| 2025 | Subsuelo | Mabel | | |
| 2025 | A la cara (Face to Face) | | | |
| 2026 | Yo no moriré de amor (I Won't Die for Love) | | | |

== Accolades ==
| Year | Award | Category | Work | Result | Ref. |
|---|---|---|---|---|---|
| 2008 | 17th Actors and Actresses Union Awards | Best New Actress | Solitary Fragments | Won | |
| 2013 | 22nd Actors and Actresses Union Awards | Best Film Actress in a Leading Role | Orson West | Nominated | |
| 2019 | 28th Actors and Actresses Union Awards | Best Film Actress in a Minor Role | The Realm | Nominated | |
| 2022 | 77th CEC Medals | Best Supporting Actress | The Good Boss | Nominated | |
| 2022 | 36th Goya Awards | Best Supporting Actress | The Good Boss | Nominated | |
| 2022 | 30th Actors and Actresses Union Awards | Best Film Actress in a Secondary Role | The Good Boss | Won | |
