= Goya Toledo =

Spanish actress and model

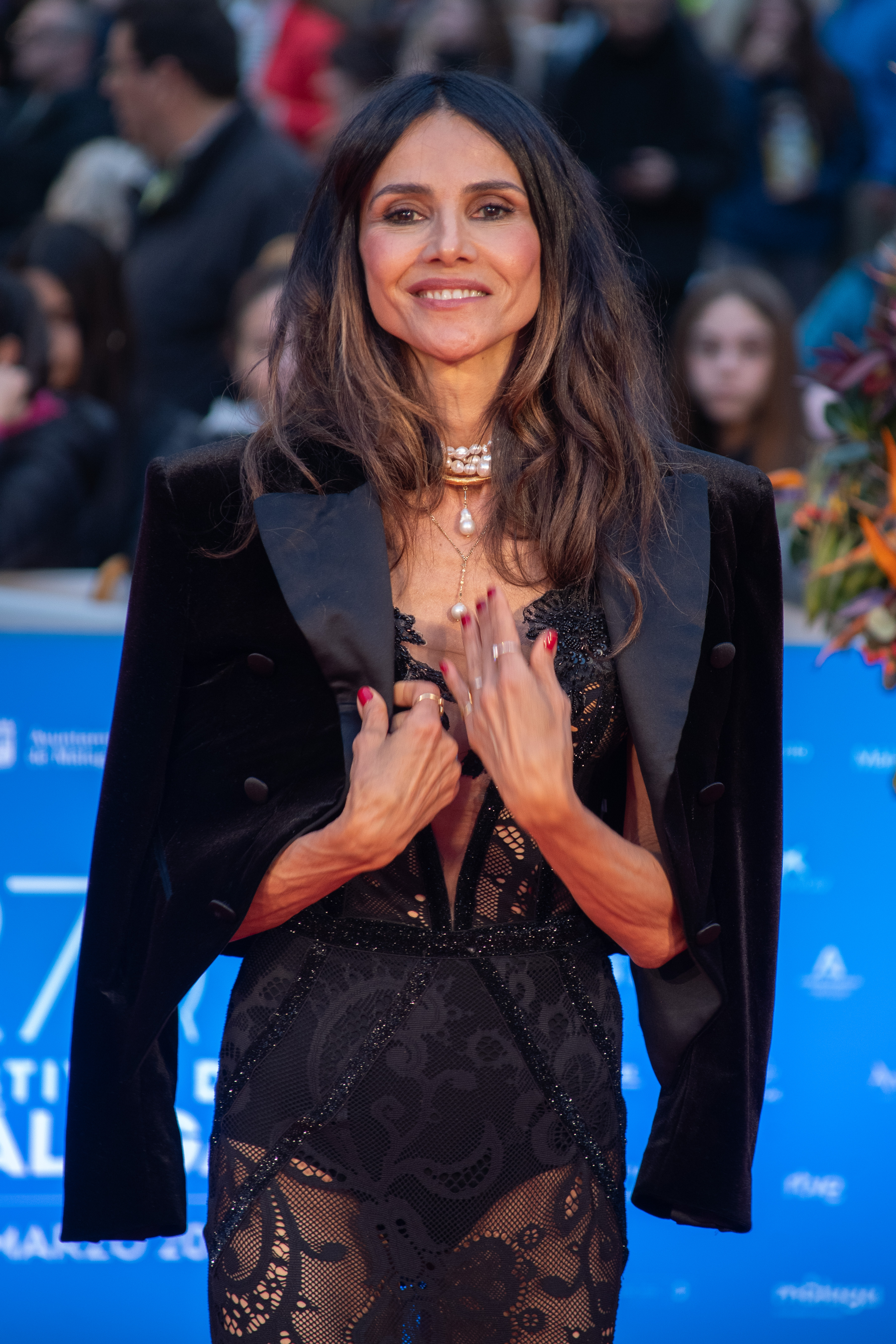
- Toledo in 2024
- Born: Gregoria Micaela Toledo Machín; 24 September 1969 (age 56); Arrecife, Spain
- Education: Cristina Rota School of Dramatic Arts
- Occupations: Actress, model
- Years active: 1993–present
- Spouse: Craig Ross (m. 2014)
- Partner: Olivier Martinez (2007–2010)

Gregoria Micaela Toledo Machín (born 24 September 1969) professionally known as Goya Toledo, is a Spanish actress and model. She has appeared in Amores perros, Killing Words, and 13 Roses.

== Early life and career ==
Gregoria Micaela Toledo Machín was born in Arrecife, Lanzarote, on 24 September 1969 but was raised in Las Palmas. Before venturing into acting, Toledo had worked as a model. She made her debut in 1993, and has since performed in Spanish, Italian and German productions. At the 13th Goya Awards, Toledo was nominated for Best New Actress for her performance in Mararía. In 2003, at the 53rd Berlin International Film Festival, she was one of several young European actors that were presented the Shooting Stars Award by the European Film Promotion.

== Personal life ==
Toledo is a close friend of fellow actress Penélope Cruz, whom she met while studying acting in the school of Cristina Rota. In 2015, she confirmed her marriage to guitarist Craig Ross, with whom she had been engaged since the prior year.

== Filmography ==
Title	Original Title	Year	Role	Notes
The Thieves Go to the Office	Los ladrones van a la oficina	1993	Unknown	(TV) 1993–94; 6 episodes
Delighted by Life	Encantada de la vida	1994	Unknown	(TV) 1 episode
Brothers by Milk	Hermanos de leche	1994	Unknown	(TV) 1994–96
Everyone Abroad	Todos a bordo	1995	Unknown	(TV Film)
Tell Laura that I Love You	Dile a Laure que la quiero	1996	Eva	
Diary of a Violated Love	Cronaca di un amore violato	1996	Sonia	
Beyond the Garden	Más allá del jardín	1997	Teresa	
Mararía	Mararía	1998	Mararía	
Amores Perros	Amores perros	2000	Valeria	
The Stranger	Die Fremde	2000	Mercedes	
Box 507	La caja 507	2002	Mónica Vega	
Knots	Nudos	2003	Silvia	
Killing Words	Palabras encadenadas	2003	Laura	
Stork Day	È già ieri	2004	Rita	
Body Confusion	Fuera del cuerpo	2004	Bárbara / Julia	
Dancing Chachacha	Bailando chachacha	2005	Alicia	
Somne	Somne	2005	Andrea	
Films to Keep You Awake: A Real Friend	Películas para no dormir: Adivina quién soy	2006	Angela	(TV Film)
The Countess of Castiglione	La contessa di Castiglione	2006	Eugénie de Montijo	(TV Film)
The Last of the Just	El último justo	2007	Victoria	
13 Roses	Las 13 rosas	2007	Carmen Castro	
Rivals	Rivales	2008	Maribel	
Rated R	Rated R	2008	Lina Mora	
Sandrine in the Rain	Sandrine nella pioggia	2008	Giuliana	
Accused	Acusados	2009	Beatriz Montero	(TV) 13 episodes
Plans for Tomorrow	Planes para mañana	2010	Inés	
Paco's Men	Los hombres de Paco	2010	Reyes	(TV) 13 episodes
Friends...	Amigos...	2011	Carolina	
Maktub	Maktub	2011	Mari Luz	
The Cliff	Acantilado	2016	Santana	

== Awards and nominations ==
Award	Year	Category	Nominated work	Result
Goya Awards	1998	Best New Actress	Mararía	Nominated
European Film Promotion Shooting Stars Awards	2003	Shooting Star	—	Won
GQ Magazine Awards	2009	Best Actress	Accused	Won
