= 66th CEC Awards =

Spanish film awards

- Date: 31 January 2011
- Site: Cine Palafox, Madrid, Spain
- Hosted by: Miriam Giovanelli; Rubén Ochandiano
- Organized by: Círculo de Escritores Cinematográficos

Highlights
- Most awards: Even the Rain (6)
- Most nominations: Even the Rain (8)

The 66th CEC Medals ceremony, presented by the Círculo de Escritores Cinematográficos, took place on 31 January 2011 at the Cine Palafox in Madrid. The gala was hosted by Miriam Giovanelli and Rubén Ochandiano.

== Winners and nominees ==
The winners and nominees are listed as follows:

Best Film: Even the Rain; Ways to Live Forever; Biutiful; Forever Young	Best Director: Icíar Bollaín – Even the Rain; Rodrigo Cortés – Buried; Gustavo Ron – Ways to Live Forever; Alejandro González Iñárritu – Biutiful
Best Original Screenplay: Paul Laverty – Even the Rain; Chris Sparling – Buried; Albert Espinosa, Pau Freixas – Forever Young; Alejandro González Iñárritu, Armando Bó, Nicolás Giacobone – Biutiful	Best Adapted Screenplay: Gustavo Ron – Ways to Live Forever; Agustí Villaronga – Black Bread; Emilio Estevez – The Way; Michel Gaztambide, Rodrigo Rodero – The Impossible Language
Best Actor: Javier Bardem – Biutiful; Luis Tosar – Even the Rain; Unax Ugalde – Bon appétit; Alberto Ammann – Lope	Best Actress: Petra Martínez – Born to Suffer; Belén Rueda – Julia's Eyes; Magaly Solier – Amador; Leonor Watling – Lope
Best Supporting Actor: Karra Elejalde – Even the Rain; Celso Bugallo – Amador; Sancho Gracia – Among Wolves; José Luis Gómez – Anything You Want; Àlex Brendemühl – Forever Young	Best Supporting Actress: Eva Santolaria – Forever Young; Laia Marull – Black Bread; Carmen Machi – Paper Birds; Esperanza Pedreño – 18 Meals
Best New Artist: Juana Macías – Plans for Tomorrow; Manuel Camacho – Among Wolves; David Pinillos – Bon appétit; Aura Garrido – Plans for Tomorrow	Best Music: Alberto Iglesias – Even the Rain; Fernando Velázquez – Lope; Roque Baños – The Last Circus; César Benito – Ways to Live Forever
Best Cinematography: Álex Catalán – Even the Rain; Miguel Pérez Gilaberte – Ways to Live Forever; Eduard Grau – Buried; Juan Miguel Azpiroz – Bruc	Best Editing: Rodrigo Cortés – Buried; Ángel Hernández Zoido – Even the Rain; Juan Sánchez – Ways to Live Forever; Alejandro Lázaro – The Last Circus
Best Documentary Film: La última cima; María y yo; How Much Does Your Building Weigh, Mr. Foster?; Bicicleta, cullera, poma	Best Foreign Film: Toy Story 3; The King's Speech; Inception; The Social Network

== Special awards ==
- Honorary Medal: Tony Leblanc
- Medal for the Journalistic and Literary Merit: Emilio Carlos García Fernández
