= List of Spanish films of 2010 =

A list of Spanish-produced and co-produced feature films released in Spain in 2010. When applicable, the domestic theatrical release date is favoured.

== Films ==
Release		Title (Domestic title)	Cast & Crew	Distribution label	Ref.
J A N U A R Y	8	The Consul of Sodom (El cónsul de Sodoma)	Director: Sigfrid Monleón Cast: Jordi Mollà, Bimba Bosé, Àlex Brendemühl	Rodeo Media	
J A N U A R Y	15	Hierro	Director: Gabe Ibáñez Cast: Elena Anaya, Bea Segura, Mar Sodupe	Paramount Pictures	
J A N U A R Y	22	The Valdemar Legacy (La herencia Valdemar)	Director: José Luis Alemán Cast: Laia Marull, Daniele Liotti, Paul Naschy, Silvia Abascal, Ana Risueño, Óscar Jaenada	Universal Pictures	
J A N U A R Y	29	Woman Without Piano (La mujer sin piano)	Director: Javier Rebollo Cast: Carmen Machi, Nadia de Santiago, Pep Ricart, Jan Budař	Avalon	
F E B R U A R Y	5	Luna caliente	Director: Vicente Aranda Cast: Eduard Fernández, Thaïs Blume, Emilio Gutiérrez Caba, José Coronado, Mary Carmen Ramírez, Carla Sánchez, Empar Ferrer	Paramount Pictures	
F E B R U A R Y	12	Nacidas para sufrir	Director: Miguel Albaladejo Cast: Adriana Ozores, Petra Martínez, Alfonsa Rosso, Malena Alterio, Mariola Fuentes	Alta Classics	
F E B R U A R Y	19	Mad Love (Amores locos)	Director: Beda Docampo Feijóo Cast: Eduard Fernández, Irene Visedo, Marta Belaustegui, Marisa Paredes	Wanda Visión	
M A R C H	5	El corredor nocturno	Director: Gerardo Herrero Cast: Leonardo Sbaraglia, Miguel Ángel Solá, Érica Rivas	.	
M A R C H	12	Paper Birds (Pájaros de papel)	Director: Emilio Aragón Cast: Imanol Arias, Lluís Homar, Roger Príncep, Carmen Machi	Hispano Foxfilm	
M A R C H	18	Unresolved Sexual Tension (Tensión sexual no resuelta)	Director: Miguel Ángel Lamata Cast: Norma Ruiz, Pilar Rubio, Salomé Jiménez, Miguel Ángel Muñoz, Fele Martínez, Amaia Salamanca, Adam Jezierski, Santiago Segura, Samuel Miró, Joaquín Reyes	Paramount Pictures	
M A R C H	18	For the Good of Others (El mal ajeno)	Director: Oskar Santos Cast: Eduardo Noriega, Belén Rueda, Angie Cepeda	Alta Classics	
M A R C H	26	The Widows of Thursdays (Las viudas de los jueves)	Director: Marcelo Piñeyro Cast: Ernesto Alterio, Juana Viale, Gabriela Toscano, Ana Celentano, Gloria Carrá, Juan Diego Botto, Pablo Echarri, Leonardo Sbaraglia, Adrián Navarro	Alta Classics	(Note: Co-production Spain–Argentina (64.80%–35.20%).)
A P R I L	9	The Island Inside (La isla interior)	Director: Dunia Ayaso, Félix Sabroso Cast: Candela Peña, Alberto San Juan, Cristina Marcos, Geraldine Chaplin, Celso Bugallo, Antonio de la Torre	Alta Classics	
A P R I L	9	The Orange Girl (La joven de las naranjas)	Director: Eva Dahr Cast: Annie Dahr Nygaard, Mikkel Bratt Silset	—N/a	
A P R I L	23	To Hell with the Ugly (Que se mueran los feos)	Director: Nacho G. Velilla Cast: Javier Cámara, Carmen Machi	Warner Bros. Pictures	
A P R I L	23	Oceans (Océanos)	Director: Jacques Perrin, Jacques Cluzaud	Vértice 360	
A P R I L	23	E.S.O (entidad sobrenatural oculta)	Director: Santiago Lapeira Cast: Sergi Mateu, Mercè Llorens, Rosana Pastor, Fernando Guillén	Flins y Pinículas	
A P R I L	23	El discípulo	Director: Emilio Ruiz Barrachina Cast: Joel West, Ruth Gabriel, Juanjo Puigcorbé, Jorge Bosso, Marisa Berenson, Juan del Santo	Pirámide Films	
A P R I L	30	Ingrid	Director: Eduard Cortés Cast: Elena Serrano, Eduard Farelo	—N/a	
M A Y	7	Magic Journey to Africa (Viaje mágico a África)	Director: Jordi Llompart Cast: Eva Gerretsen, Raymond Mvula, Verónica Blume, Adrià Collado, Leonor Watling	Filmax	
M A Y	7	Room in Rome (Habitación en Roma)	Director: Julio Medem Cast: Elena Anaya, Natasha Yarovenko, Enrico Lo Verso, Najwa Nimri	Paramount Pictures	
M A Y	28	Rage (Rabia)	Director: Sebastián Cordero Cast: Martina García, Concha Velasco, Gustavo Sánchez Parra, Xabier Elorriaga, Icíar Bollaín, Alex Brendemühl	Wanda Visión	
J U N E	11	Campamento Flipy	Director: Rafa Parbus Cast: Pablo Carbonell, Pedro Reyes, Carlos Areces, Eloi Yebra, Rosario Pardo, Marta Belmonte, Ernesto Sevilla, Flipy	Buena Vista International	
J U N E	18	La venganza de Ira Vamp	Director: Álvaro Sáenz de Heredia Cast: Florentino Fernández, Josema Yuste, Chiquito de la Calzada, Javivi, Mireia Canalda	Sony Pictures	
J U N E	25	La vida empieza hoy	Director: Laura Mañá Cast: Pilar Bardem, Rosa María Sardá, Mariana Cordero, María Barranco	Filmax	
J U L Y	16	With or Without Love (Una hora más en Canarias)	Director: David Serrano Cast: Quim Gutiérrez, Angie Cepeda, Juana Acosta, Miren Ibarguren, Eduardo Blanco, Kiti Mánver, Isabel Ordaz	Vértice 360	
J U L Y	23	El diario de Carlota	Director: José Manuel Carrasco Cast: Andrea Ros, Maxi Iglesias, Lorena Mateo, Lidia Fayren, David Castillo	Aurum	
A U G U S T	27	You Will Meet a Tall Dark Stranger (Conocerás al hombre de tus sueños)	Director: Woody Allen Cast: Antonio Banderas, Josh Brolin, Anthony Hopkins, Gemma Jones, Freida Pinto, Naomi Watts	Alta Classics	
S E P T E M B E R	3	Lope: The Outlaw (Lope)	Director: Andrucha Waddington Cast: Alberto Ammann, Leonor Watling, Pilar López de Ayala	Hispano Foxfilm	(Note: Co-production Spain–Brazil (77.50%–22.50%).)
S E P T E M B E R	10	Anything You Want (Todo lo que tú quieras)	Director: Achero Mañas Cast: Juan Diego Botto, José Luis Gómez, Ana Risueño, Pedro Alonso, Najwa Nimri, Alberto Jiménez, Ana Wagener, Paloma Lorena, Lucía Fernández	Wanda Visión	
S E P T E M B E R	24	The Great Vazquez (El gran Vázquez)	Director: Óscar Aibar Cast: Santiago Segura, Mercè Llorens, Álex Angulo, Enrique Villén, Jesús Guzmán, Manolo Solo, Itziar Aizpuru, Albert Vidal, Pep Sais	Alta Classics	
S E P T E M B E R	24	Awaking from a Dream (Amanecer de un sueño)	Director: Freddy Mas Franqueza Cast: Héctor Alterio, Alberto Ferreiro, Mónica López, Sergio Padilla, Aroa Gimeno	—N/a	(Note: Co-production Spain–Poland (80%–20%).)
S E P T E M B E R	24	Elisa K	Director: Jordi Cadena, Judith Colell Cast: Aina Clotet, Lydia Zimmermann, Clàudia Pons, Hans Richter, Nausicaa Bonnín	Wanda Visión	
O C T O B E R	1	Buried (Enterrado)	Director: Rodrigo Cortés Cast: Ryan Reynolds, Robert Paterson, José Luis García Pérez, Stephen Tobolowsky, Samantha Mathis, Warner Loughlin, Ivana Miño, Erik Palladino	Warner Bros. Pictures	
O C T O B E R	8	Amador	Director: Fernando León de Aranoa Cast: Magaly Solier, Celso Bugallo, Pietro Sibille, Sonia Almarcha, Fanny de Castro	Alta Classics	
O C T O B E R	15	Black Bread (Pa negre)	Director: Agustí Villaronga Cast: Roger Casamajor, Nora Navas, Laia Marull, Eduard Fernández, Sergi López	Emon	
O C T O B E R	15	Di Di Hollywood	Director: Bigas Luna Cast: Elsa Pataky, Peter Coyote, Paul Sculfor, Giovanna Zacaría, Luis Hacha, Flora Martínez, Jean-Marie Juan, Leonardo García	Warner Bros. Pictures	
O C T O B E R	22	Heroes (Herois)	Director: Pau Freixas Cast: Eva Santolaria, Alex Brendemühl, Emma Suárez, Nerea Camacho, Lluís Homar	Alta Classics	
O C T O B E R	22	Izarren argia	Director: Mikel Rueda Cast: Bárbara Goenaga, Itziar Ituño, Maite Arrese, Klara Badiola, Maite Bastos, Aitor Beltrán, Teresa Calo, Sara Cozar	Barton Films	
O C T O B E R	29	Julia's Eyes (Los ojos de Julia)	Director: Guillem Morales Cast: Belén Rueda, Lluís Homar, Pablo Derqui, Francesc Orella, Joan Dalmau, Julia Gutiérrez Caba, Boris Ruiz	Universal Pictures	
O C T O B E R	29	The Happets (La tropa de trapo en el país donde siempre brilla el sol)	Director: Alex Colls	Alta Classics	
O C T O B E R	29	14 Days with Victor (14 días con Víctor)	Director: Román Parrado Cast: Fernando Tielve, Joe Dixon, Margo Stilley	—N/a	
O C T O B E R	29	Retornos	Directo: Luis Avilés Baquero Cast: Xavier Estévez, Manuela Vellés, Xosé Manuel Olveira, María Bouzas, Emilio Gutiérrez Caba, María Tasende, Sabrina Praga, Luis Zahera, Solange Freitas, Antonio Durán, Yoima Valdés	Vértice 360	
O C T O B E R	29	Ways to Live Forever (Vivir para siempre)	Director: Gustavo Ron Cast: Robbie Kay, Ben Chaplin, Emilia Fox, Alex Etel, Phyllida Law, Natalia Tena, Greta Scacchi, Ella Purnell	European Dreams Factory	(Note: Co-production Spain–United Kingdom (56%–44%).)
N O V E M B E R	5	Agnosia	Director: Eugenio Mira Cast: Eduardo Noriega, Sergi Mateu, Bárbara Goenaga, Félix Gómez, Martina Gedeck, Jack Taylor	Aurum	
N O V E M B E R	5	The Mosquito Net (La mosquitera)	Director: Agustí Vila Cast: Eduard Fernández, Emma Suárez, Fermí Reixach, Geraldine Chaplin, Martina García, Anna Yzcobalzeta	Baditri	
N O V E M B E R	12	Bon appétit	Director: David Pinillos Cast: Unax Ugalde, Nora Tschirner, Herbert Knaup	Vértice 360	
N O V E M B E R	12	Cruzando el límite	Director: Xavi Giménez Cast: Marcel Borràs, Adolfo Fernández, Fernando Guillén Cuervo, Irene Escolar, Elena Furiase, Adam Jezierski, Gonzalo Ramos, Emma Vilarasau	Filmax	
N O V E M B E R	19	The Way (El camino)	Director: Emilio Estevez Cast: Martin Sheen, Deborah Kara Unger, Joaquim de Almeida, Tchéky Karyo, James Nesbitt, Ángela Molina, Emilio Estevez	Filmax	
N O V E M B E R	19	Plans for Tomorrow (Planes para mañana)	Director: Juana Macías Cast: Carme Elias, Goya Toledo, Ana Labordeta, Aura Garrido	A Contracorriente Films	
N O V E M B E R	19	Flamenco, Flamenco	Director: Carlos Saura	Alta Classics	
N O V E M B E R	26	Among Wolves (Entrelobos)	Directo: Gerardo Olivares Cast: Juan José Ballesta	Wanda Visión	
N O V E M B E R	26	The Impossible Language (El idioma imposible)	Director: Rodrigo Rodero Cast: Andrés Gertrúdix, Irene Escolar, Helena Miquel	Barton Films	
N O V E M B E R	26	18 Meals (18 comidas)	Director: Jorge Coira Cast: Luis Tosar, Sergio Peris-Mencheta, Cristina Brondo, Víctor Clavijo, Esperanza Pedreño, Pedro Alonso, Juan Carlos Vellido	Festival Films	
N O V E M B E R	26	Las aventuras de Don Quijote	Director: Antonio Zurera	Premium Cine	
D E C E M B E R	3	Three Steps Above Heaven (Tres metros sobre el cielo)	Director: Fernando González Molina Cast: Mario Casas, María Valverde, Diego Martín, Luis Fernández, Álvaro Cervantes, Nerea Camacho, Andrea Duro, Marina Salas, Clara Segura	Warner Bros. Pictures	
D E C E M B E R	3	Biutiful	Director: Alejandro González Iñárritu Cast: Javier Bardem, Maricel Álvarez, Eduard Fernández	Universal Pictures	(Note: Co-production Spain–Mexico (45%–55%).)
D E C E M B E R	10	Every Song Is About Me (Todas las canciones hablan de mí)	Director: Jonás Trueba Cast: Oriol Vila, Bárbara Lennie, Bruno Bergonzini, Valeria Alonso, Ángela Cremonte, Miriam Giovanelli, Ramon Fontserè	Alta Classics	
D E C E M B E R	17	The Last Circus (Balada triste de trompeta)	Director: Álex de la Iglesia Cast: Carlos Areces, Carolina Bang, Antonio de la Torre, Sancho Gracia, Juan Luis Galiardo, Enrique Villén, Manuel Tallafé, Manuel Tejada, Gracia Olayo, Santiago Segura, Fernando Guillén Cuervo, Fran Perea	Warner Bros. Pictures	
D E C E M B E R	17	Don Mendo Rock ¿La venganza?	Director: José Luis García Sánchez Cast: Paz Vega, Fele Martínez, Manuel Bandera, Antonio Resines, María Barranco, Elena Furiase, Juanjo Cucalón	Aurum	
D E C E M B E R	22	Bruc, el desafío	Director: Daniel Benmayor Cast: Juan José Ballesta, Astrid Bergès-Frisbey, Vincent Perez, Santi Millán, Nicolas Giraud	Universal Pictures	
D E C E M B E R	29	Exorcismus (La posesión de Emma Evans)	Director: Manuel Carballo Cast: Sophie Vavasseur, Stephen Billington, Douglas Bradley	Filmax	

== Box office ==
The ten highest-grossing Spanish films in 2010, by domestic box office gross revenue, are as follows:

Highest-grossing films of 2010
Rank	Title	Distributor	Admissions	Domestic gross (€)
1	Three Steps Above Heaven (Tres metros sobre el cielo)	Warner Bros. Pictures	1,331,895	8,464,994.39
2	Julia's Eyes (Los ojos de Julia)	Universal Pictures	1,088,368	6,867,364.82
3	To Hell with the Ugly (Que se mueran los feos)	Warner Bros. Pictures	1,127,131	6,766,147.71
4	You Will Meet a Tall Dark Stranger (Conocerás al hombre de tus sueños)	Alta Classics	697,946	4,456,770.47
5	Cell 211 (Celda 211) ‡	Paramount Pictures	669,741	4,065,687.33
6	Lope. The Outlaw (Lope)	Hispano Foxfilm	601,166	3,696,923.18
7	Biutiful	Universal Pictures	409,930	2,728,684.58
8	Among Wolves (Entrelobos)	Wanda Visión	424,883	2,686,146.90
9	Buried (Enterrado)	Warner Bros. Pictures	377,597	2,387,317.12
10	Unresolved Sexual Tension (Tensión sexual no resuelta)	Paramount Pictures	334,287	2,051,567.60
‡: 2009 theatrical opening

== See also ==
- 25th Goya Awards
- List of 2010 box office number-one films in Spain
