= 25th Goya Awards =

- Date: 13 February 2011
- Site: Teatro Real, Madrid
- Hosted by: Andreu Buenafuente
- Organized by: Academy of Cinematographic Arts and Sciences of Spain

Highlights
- Best Film: Black Bread
- Best Actor: Javier Bardem; Biutiful
- Best Actress: Nora Navas; Black Bread
- Most awards: Black Bread (9)
- Most nominations: The Last Circus (15)

Television coverage
- Network: La 1
- Viewership: 4.34 million (25.4%)

The 25th Goya Awards ceremony, presented by the Academy of Cinematographic Arts and Sciences of Spain, took place on 13 February 2011 at the Teatro Real. Black Bread by Agustí Villaronga won nine awards, including Best Film and Best Director. Broadcast on La 1, the gala saw returning host Andreu Buenafuente. Mario Camus was the recipient of the Honorary Goya Award.

== Winners and nominees ==
The winners and nominees are listed as follows:

Best Film: Black Bread; The Last Circus; Buried; Even the Rain	Best Director: Agustí Villaronga – Black Bread; Álex de la Iglesia – The Last Circus; Rodrigo Cortés – Buried; Icíar Bollaín – Even the Rain
Best Actor: Javier Bardem – Biutiful; Antonio de la Torre – The Last Circus; Ryan Reynolds – Buried; Luis Tosar – Even the Rain	Best Actress: Nora Navas – Black Bread; Elena Anaya – Room in Rome; Emma Suárez – The Mosquito Net; Belén Rueda – Julia's Eyes
Best Supporting Actor: Karra Elejalde – Even the Rain; Eduard Fernández – Biutiful; Álex Angulo – The Great Vazquez; Sergi López – Black Bread	Best Supporting Actress: Laia Marull – Black Bread; Terele Pávez – The Last Circus; Ana Wagener – Biutiful; Pilar López de Ayala – Lope
Best New Actor: Francesc Colomer – Black Bread; Manuel Camacho – Among Wolves; Juan Carlos Aduviri – Even the Rain; Oriol Vila – Every Song Is About Me	Best New Actress: Marina Comas – Black Bread; Carolina Bang – The Last Circus; Natasha Yarovenko – Room in Rome; Aura Garrido – Plans for Tomorrow
Best Original Screenplay: Chris Sparling – Buried; Álex de la Iglesia – The Last Circus; Alejandro González Iñárritu, Armando Bó, Nicolás Giacobone – Biutiful; Paul Laverty – Even the Rain	Best Adapted Screenplay: Agustí Villaronga – Black Bread; Jordi Cadena – Elisa K; Julio Medem – Room in Rome; Ramón Salazar – Three Steps Above Heaven
Best Ibero-American Foreign Film: The Life of Fish · Chile; Undertow · Peru; The Man Next Door · Argentina; Hell · Mexico	Best European Film: The King's Speech · United Kingdom; A Prophet · France; The Ghost Writer · France/Germany/United Kingdom; The White Ribbon · Germany
Best New Director: David Pinillos – Bon Appétit; Emilio Aragón – Paper Birds; Juana Macías – Plans for Tomorrow; Jonás Trueba – Every Song Is About Me	Best Animated Film: Chico and Rita; El tesoro del rey Midas; The Happets; Las aventuras de Don Quijote
Best Cinematography: Antonio Riestra – Black Bread; Kiko de la Rica – The Last Circus; Rodrigo Prieto – Biutiful; Eduard Grau – Buried	Best Editing: Rodrigo Cortés – Buried; Alejandro Lázaro – The Last Circus; Stephen Mirrione – Biutiful; Ángel Hernández Zoido – Even the Rain
Best Art Direction: Ana Alvargonzález – Black Bread; Edou Hydallgo – The Last Circus; Brigitte Broch – Biutiful; César Macarrón – Lope	Best Production Supervision: Cristina Zumárraga – Even the Rain; Yousaf Bhokari – The Last Circus; Edmon Roch Colom, Toni Novella – Lope; Aleix Castellón – Black Bread
Best Sound: Urko Garai, Marc Orts, James Muñoz – Buried; Charly Schmukler, Diego Garrido – The Last Circus; Dani Fontrodona, Fernando Novillo, Ricard Casals – Black Bread; Emilio Cortés, Nacho Royo-Villanova, Pelayo Gutiérrez – Even the Rain	Best Special Effects: Reyes Abades, Ferrán Piquer – The Last Circus; Gabriel Paré, Álex Villagrasa – Buried; Raúl Romanillos, Marcelo Siqueira – Lope; Gustavo Harry Farias, Juanma Nogales – Even the Rain
Best Costume Design: Tatiana Hernández – Lope; Paco Delgado – The Last Circus; Mercè Paloma – Black Bread; Sonia Grande – Even the Rain	Best Makeup and Hairstyles: José Quetglas, Pedro Rodríguez "Pedrati", Nieves Sánchez Torres – The Last Circus; Karmele Soler, Martín Trujillo Macías, Paco Rodríguez – Lope; Alma Casal, Satur Merino – Black Bread; Karmele Soler, Paco Rodríguez – Even the Rain
Best Original Score: Alberto Iglesias – Even the Rain; Roque Baños – The Last Circus; Gustavo Santaolalla – Biutiful; Víctor Reyes – Buried	Best Original Song: "Que el soneto nos tome por sorpresa" by Jorge Drexler – Lope; "In The Lap of The Mountain" by Víctor Reyes and Rodrigo Cortés – Buried; "Loving Strangers" by Russian Red – Room in Rome; "No se puede vivir con un franco" by Emilio Aragón Álvarez – Paper Birds
Best Fictional Short Film: Una caja de botones; Adiós papá, adiós mamá; El orden de las cosas; Zumo de limón	Best Animated Short Film: La bruxa; Exlibris; The Tower of Time; Vicenta
Best Documentary Film: Bicicleta, cuchara, manzana; Ciudadano Negrín; How Much Does Your Building Weigh, Mr Foster?; María y yo	Best Documentary Short Film: Memorias de un cine de provincias; El cine libertario: cuando las películas hacen historia; El pabellón alemán; Un dios que ya no ampara

=== Films with multiple nominations and awards ===
Films with multiple nominations
Nominations	Film
15	The Last Circus
14	Black Bread
13	Even the Rain
10	Buried
8	Biutiful
7	Lope
4	Room in Rome
2	Plans for Tomorrow
2	Every Song Is About Me
2	Paper Birds

Films with multiple awards
Awards	Film
9	Black Bread
3	Even the Rain
3	Buried
2	The Last Circus
2	Lope

== Honorary Goya ==
- Mario Camus
