= 3rd Gaudí Awards =

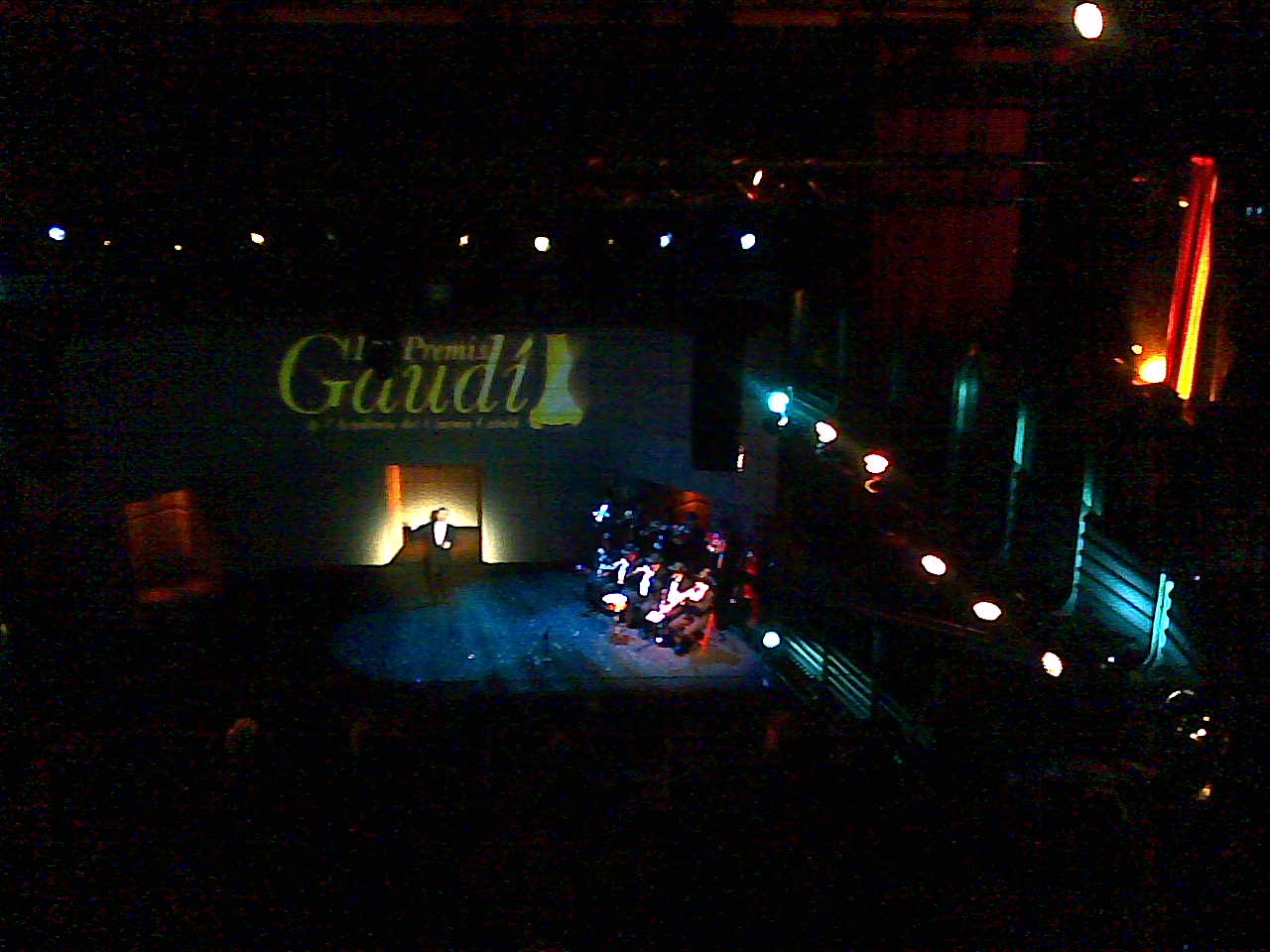
- Date: 17 January 2011
- Site: Teatre Arteria Paral·lel, Barcelona, Spain
- Hosted by: Quim Masferrer
- Organized by: Catalan Film Academy

Highlights
- Most awards: Black Bread (13)
- Most nominations: Black Bread (15)

Television coverage
- Network: TV3

The 3rd Gaudí Awards ceremony, presented by the Catalan Film Academy, was held at the Teatre Arteria Paral·lel in Barcelona on 17 January 2011. The gala was hosted by Quim Masferrer.

== Background ==
The nominations were read by Xavi Lite and Cristina Brondo from La Pedrera on 22 December 2010. The awards ceremony took place on 17 January 2011 at the Teatre Arteria Paral·lel and it was hosted by Quim Masferrer.

An alleged plot of vote buying involving Salomón Shang and his production company Producciones Kaplan was revealed. Reportedly, votes were irregularly solicited for the feature films La llegenda de l'innombrable and Uruguay and the short film Fuck War. In the wake of the allegations, the Catalan Film Academy announced the opening of an "internal briefing report". Whatever the case, none of the aforementioned films won any award.

== Winners and nominees ==
The winners and nominees are listed as follows:

Best Film: Black Bread; Elisa K; Forever Young; The Mosquito Net	Bet Non-Catalan Language Film: Buried; The Great Vazquez; Julia's Eyes; Uruguay
Best Director: Agustí Villaronga — Black Bread; Rodrigo Cortés — Buried; Judith Colell, Jordi Cadena — Elisa K; Pau Freixas — Forever Young	Best Screenplay: Agustí Villaronga — Black Bread; Chris Sparling — Buried; Albert Espinosa, Pau Freixas — Forever Young; Agustí Vila — The Mosquito Net
Best Actress: Nora Navas — Black Bread; Aina Clotet — Elisa K; Clara Galí — La llegenda de l'Innombrable; Emma Suárez — The Mosquito Net	Best Actor: Eduard Fernández — The Mosquito Net; Ryan Reynolds — Buried; Jordi Mollà — The Consul of Sodom; Francesc Colomer — Black Bread
Best Supporting Actress: Marina Comas — Black Bread; Esther Bové — ¿Dónde se nacionaliza la marea?; Lydia Zimmermann — Elisa K; Alba Yáñez — Uruguay	Best Supporting Actor: Roger Casamajor — Black Bread; Lluís Homar — Forever Young; Fermí Reixach — The Mosquito Net; Rubén Jiménez — Uruguay
Best Production Supervision: Aleix Castellón — Black Bread; Inés Font — Forever Young; Víctor H. Torner — La llegenda de l'Innombrable; Reyes Matabuena — Julia's Eyes	Best Documentary Film: Bicicleta, cuchara, manzana; ¿Dónde se nacionaliza la marea?; Familystrip; María y yo
Best European Film: The White Ribbon; Le Concert; The Ghost Writer; Inception	Best Short Film: Les bessones del carrer ponent; Fuck War; Lo siento, te quiero; Mi amigo invisible
Best Television Film: Quatre estacions; El viatge vertical; La Mari. Tornar a començar i l'únic camí; Ull per ull	Best Art Direction: Ana Alvargonzález — Black Bread; María de la Cámara, Gabriel Paré — Buried; Joan Sabaté — Forever Young; Balter Gallart — Julia's Eyes
Best Editing: Rodrigo Cortés — Buried; David Gallart — Elisa K; Jaume Martí — Forever Young; Raúl Román — Black Bread	Best Cinematography: Antonio Riestra — Black Bread; Eduard Grau — Buried; Julián Elizalde — Forever Young; Óscar Faura — Julia's Eyes
Best Original Music: José Manuel Pagán — Black Bread; Xavier Oró, Pep Solórzano — ¿Dónde se nacionaliza la marea?; Arnau Bataller — Forever Young; Santos Martínez — La llegenda de l'Innombrable	Best Costume Design: Mercè Paloma — Black Bread; Ariadna Papió — Agnosia; Maria Gil — The Great Vazquez; Tatiana Hernández — Lope
Best Sound: Dani Fontrodona, Fernando Novillo, Ricard Casals — Black Bread; Urco Garai, James Muñoz, Marc Orts — Buried; Ferran Mengod, Marc Orts, Marisol Nievas — Forever Young; Albert Manera, Oriol Tarragó, Marc Orts — Julia's Eyes	Best Makeup and Hairstyles: Satur Merino, Alma Casal — Black Bread; Blanca Sánchez, Pepe Quetglas — The Great Vazquez; Laura Zamacois — La llegenda de l'Innombrable; Paco Rodríguez, Martín Macías, Karmele Soler — Lope
Best Digital/Special Effects: Josep Maria Aragonès — Viaje mágico a África; Mónica Alarcón, María de la Cámara, Gabriel Paré, Àlex Villagrasa, Salvador Santana — Buried; Apunto Lapospo — The Great Vazquez; David Martí, Montse Ribé, Jordi San Agustín, Lluís Castells — Julia's Eyes	Best Animated Film: The Happets; Rovelló. El carnaval de la Ventafocs

=== Films with multiple nominations and awards ===
Films with multiple nominations
Nominations	Film
15	Black Bread
10	Forever Young
9	Buried
6	Julia's Eyes
5	Elisa K
5	The Mosquito Net
4	The Great Vazquez
4	La llegenda de l'Innombrable
3	Uruguay
3	¿Dónde se nacionaliza la marea?
2	Lope

Films with multiple awards
Awards	Film
13	Black Bread
2	Buried

== Honorary Award ==
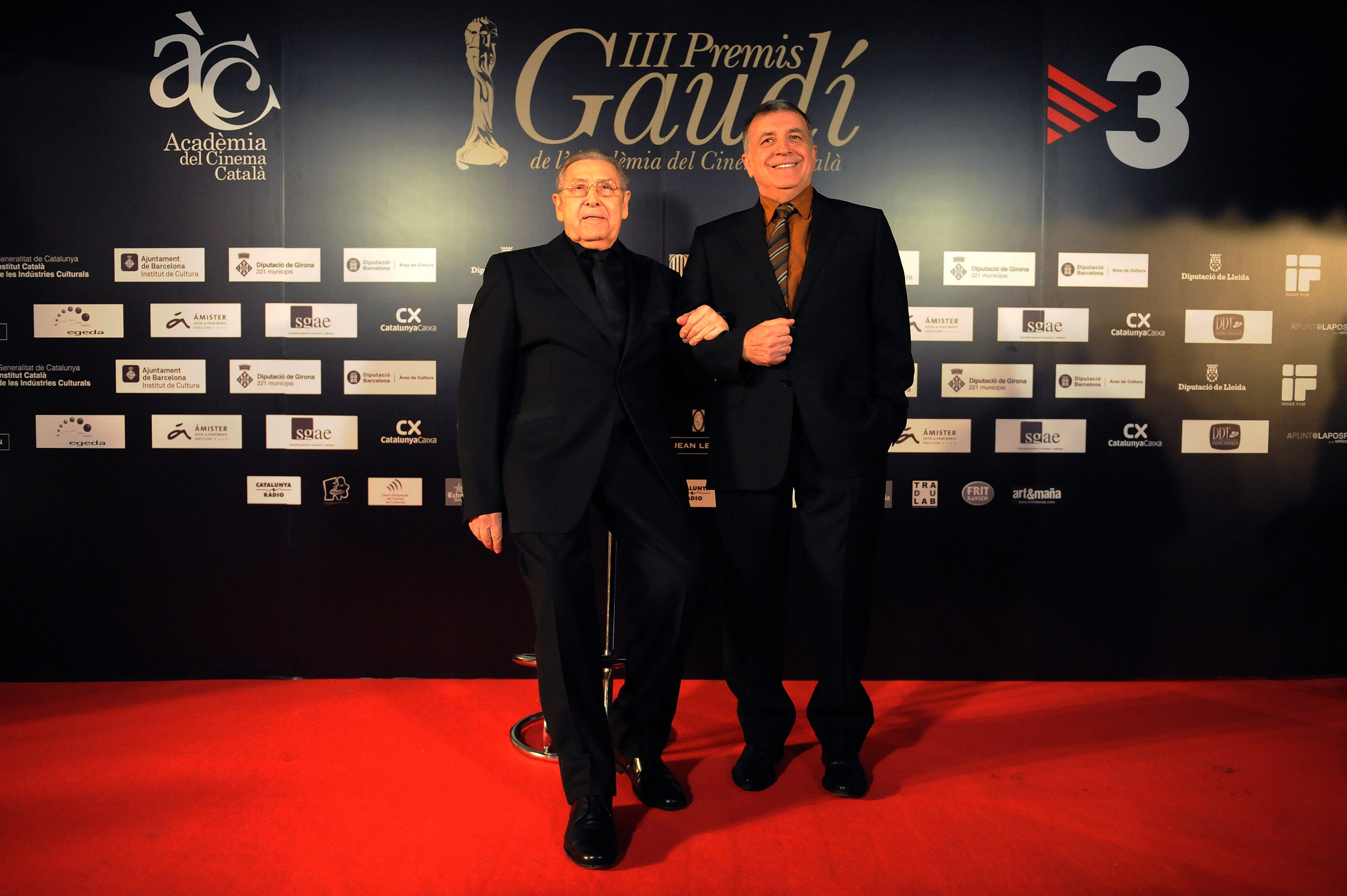
Honorary Gaudí Award recipient Jordi Dauder (left) attending the gala

Actor Jordi Dauder was the recipient of the Gaudí honorary award.
