= Forever Young (2010 film) =

- Catalan: Herois
- Directed by: Pau Freixas
- Screenplay by: Albert Espinosa; Pau Freixas
- Starring: Eva Santolaria; Alex Brendemühl; Emma Suárez; Nerea Camacho; Lluís Homar; Ferran Rull; Àlex Monner; Mireia Vilapuig; Joan Sorribes; Marc Balaguer
- Cinematography: Julián Elizalde
- Edited by: Jaume Martí
- Music by: Arnau Bataller
- Production companies: Media Films; Televisió de Catalunya
- Distributed by: Alta Classics
- Release dates: 22 April 2010 (Málaga); 22 October 2010 (Spain)
- Country: Spain
- Language: Catalan

Forever Young (Catalan: Herois) is a 2010 Spanish drama film directed by Pau Freixas, who also co-wrote it alongside Albert Espinosa. It stars Eva Santolaria, Alex Brendemühl and Emma Suárez alongside Nerea Camacho and Lluís Homar.

== Plot ==
The plot concerns a journey back to childhood (during the Summer of 1984) by means of a flashback brought by the memories of a disenchanted publicist (Sala) upon meeting with Cristina, that runs parallel to the subplot in the present time.

== Cast ==
- Eva Santolaria as Cristina
- Alex Brendemühl as Sala
- Emma Suárez as Gloria
- Nerea Camacho as Elena
- Lluís Homar as Luis
- Ferran Rull as Javi
- Àlex Monner as Ekaitz
- Mireia Vilapuig as Cristo
- Joan Sorribes as Roth
- Marc Balaguer as Colo
- Constantino Romero as Yoda
- Anna Lizaran as Iaia Men
- Albert Adrià as Òscar

== Production ==
The film is a Media Films and Televisió de Catalunya production. Shooting locations included Palamós, the Sau Reservoir, Gavà, and Dosrius. It was shot primarily in Catalan.

== Release ==
The film premiered at the 13th Málaga Film Festival's official selection on 22 April 2010. It was theatrically released in Spain on 22 October 2010.

== Reception ==
Mirito Torreiro of Fotogramas rated the film 3 out of 5 stars, highlighting "the clarity (and ability) with which it seeks its audience", while citing its certain sappiness as a negative point.

Andrea G. Bermejo of Cinemanía rated it 4 out of 5 stars, welcoming a Spanish film taking a deep dive into a childhood that is neither marginal nor traumatic.

Jordi Costa of El País wrote that even if Freixas and Espinosa's work dives into sheer cliché and cheesiness, it ends up emerging as "a solid commercial product".

Jonathan Holland of Variety considered that "more emotion than sentimentality comes through, despite some string-pulling" in a picture otherwise "all about laughter, tears and kids on bicycles riding through dappled forests".

== Accolades ==
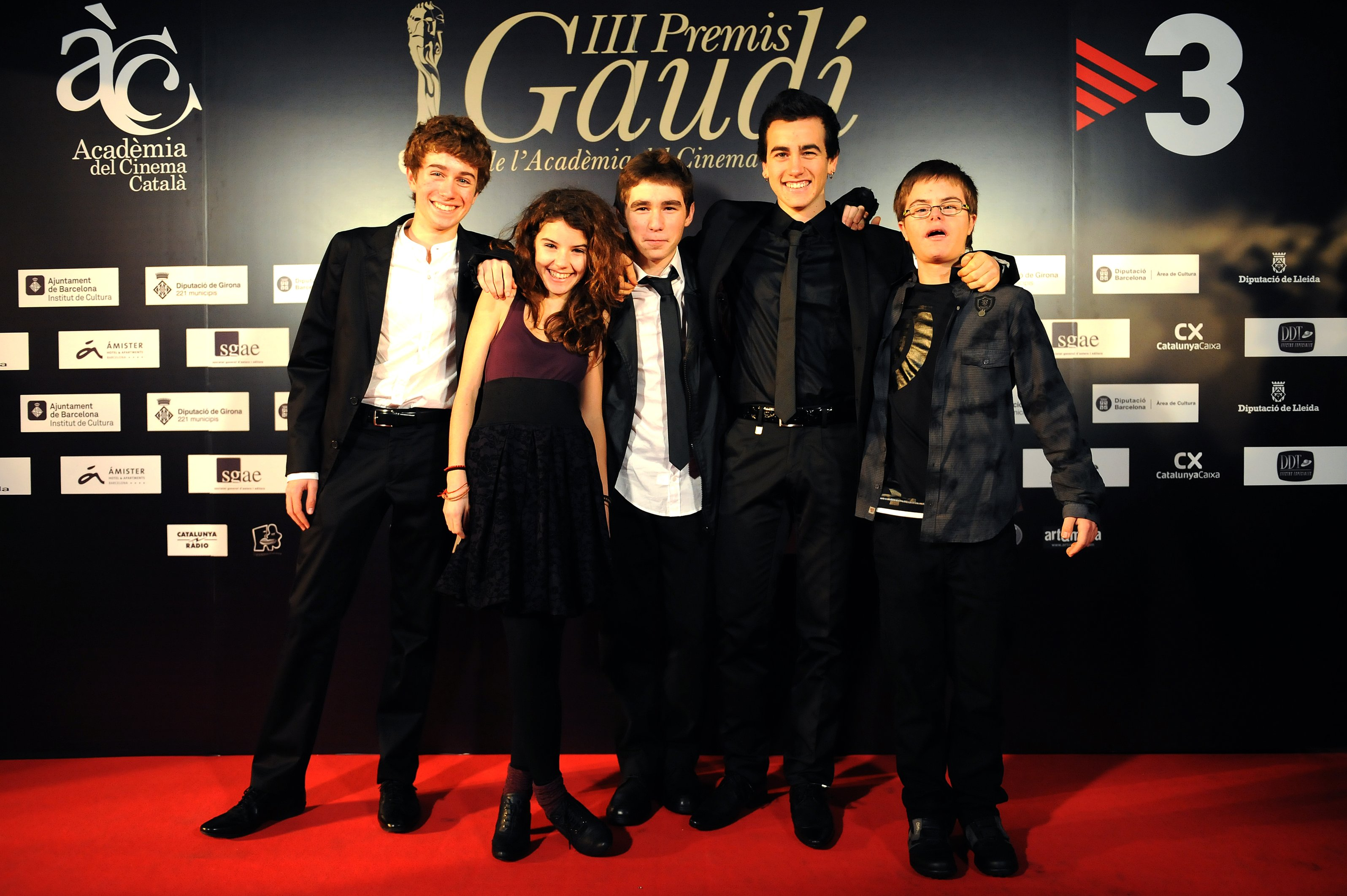
Rull, Vilapuig, Balaguer, Monner, and Sorribes attending the photocall of the 3rd Gaudí Awards in 2011

Year	Award	Category	Nominee(s)	Result	Ref.
2010	13rd Málaga Film Festival	Silver Biznaga for Audience Award		Won	
2010	13rd Málaga Film Festival	Best Costume Design	Nuria Anglada	Won	
2011	3rd Gaudí Awards	Best Catalan-language Film		Nominated	
2011	3rd Gaudí Awards	Best Director	Pau Freixas	Nominated	
2011	3rd Gaudí Awards	Best Screenplay	Albert Espinosa, Pau Freixas	Nominated	
2011	3rd Gaudí Awards	Best Production Supervision	Inés Font	Nominated	
2011	3rd Gaudí Awards	Best Art Direction	Joan Sabaté	Nominated	
2011	3rd Gaudí Awards	Best Supporting Actor	Lluís Homar	Nominated	
2011	3rd Gaudí Awards	Best Editing	Jaume Martí	Nominated	
2011	3rd Gaudí Awards	Best Original Score	Arnau Bataller	Nominated	
2011	3rd Gaudí Awards	Best Cinematography	Julián Elizalde	Nominated	
2011	3rd Gaudí Awards	Best Sound	Ferran Mengod, Marc Orts, Marisol Nievas	Nominated	
2011	66th CEC Medals	Best Film		Nominated	
2011	66th CEC Medals	Best Supporting Actress	Eva Santolaria	Won	
2011	66th CEC Medals	Best Supporting Actor	Alex Brendemühl	Nominated	
2011	66th CEC Medals	Best Original Screenplay	Albert Espinosa, Pau Freixas	Nominated	

== See also ==
- List of Spanish films of 2010
