= Lola Beccaria =

Spanish writer

- Born: 22 February 1963 (age 63); Ferrol, Spain

Lola Beccaria is a Spanish writer who is based in Madrid.

== Life ==
Beccaria was born in Ferrol in Galicia in 1963. She has a doctorate in Hispanic studies. She has written several novels which have been translated into a number of different languages. She has created a musical based on "The Little Match Girl" as well as some film scripts. The Happets (2010), which she wrote the script for, won Best Animated Film at the 3rd Gaudí Awards.

She has written about the bias that she has observed in the publishing industry which has been dominated by men who have chosen books by men for a male audience.

In 2001 she was a runner up finalist for the Premio Nadal award and in 2009 she was awarded the Premio Azorín award for El arte de perder.
