= HWG =

HWG may refer to:

- Harlem Writers Guild
- Hostage Working Group, organized by the United States Department of State during the Iraq War
