= The Great Vazquez =

- Theatrical release poster
- Spanish: El gran Vázquez
- Directed by: Óscar Aibar
- Written by: Óscar Aibar
- Produced by: Gerardo Herrero; Miriam Porté
- Starring: Santiago Segura; Álex Angulo; Mercè Llorens; Enrique Villén
- Cinematography: Mario Montero
- Edited by: Fernando Pardo
- Music by: Nacho Mastretta
- Production companies: Tornasol Films; Distinto Films; Castafiore Films
- Distributed by: Alta Classics
- Release dates: September 2010 (SSIFF); 24 September 2010 (Spain)
- Country: Spain
- Language: Spanish

The Great Vazquez (Spanish: El gran Vázquez) is a 2010 Spanish biographical comedy-drama film directed and written by Óscar Aibar which stars Santiago Segura as the title character alongside Álex Angulo, Mercè Llorens and Enrique Villén.

== Plot ==
Set in 1960s Barcelona, the plot follows the vicissitudes of Vázquez, a cartoonist and wastrel whose rogue way of living is threatened by the arrival of a foe, Peláez, an accountant hellbent on setting things right in the publishing house.

== Cast ==
- Santiago Segura as Vázquez
- Álex Angulo as Peláez
- Mercè Llorens as Rosa
- Enrique Villén as González
- Jesús Guzmán
- Manolo Solo as Ibáñez
- Itziar Aizpuru
- Albert Vidal
- Pep Sais
- Pere Ponce
- Ernesto Sevilla
- Carlos Areces

== Production ==
The film is a Distinto Films, Tornasol Films and Castafiore Films production, with the participation of TVE, TVC and Canal+ España. Shooting locations included Barcelona and the Ciudad de la Luz studio in Alicante.

== Release ==
The Great Vazquez was presented at the 58th San Sebastián International Film Festival in September 2010, screened as part of the festival's main competition. It was theatrically released in Spain on 24 September 2010.

== Reception ==
In the view of Mark Adams, of ScreenDaily, the film constitutes "a delightful mixture of genial period comedy mixed with comic strip characters bouncing out of the screen".

Carlos Marañón of Cinemanía gave the film 3 out of 5 stars, presenting it as a "Lopezvazquez-esque version of Catch Me If You Can full of city guards", considering that the imbrication of the setting with the lead character's spirit is so-so, while the supporting cast performs well.

Sergi Sánchez of Fotogramas score 3 out of 5 stars, considering that the "faithful portrayal" of the working environment in Franco era and Santiago Segura's "spectacular performance", balancing "tenderness and cynicism", make the film a "pleasant surprise", while considering the animated segments to be "expendable".

== Accolades ==
| Year | Award | Category | Nominee(s) | Result | Ref. |
|---|---|---|---|---|---|
| 2011 | 3rd Gaudí Awards | Best Non-Catalan Language Film | | Nominated | |
| 2011 | 3rd Gaudí Awards | Best Costume Design | Maria Gil, Sonia Segura | Nominated | |
| 2011 | 3rd Gaudí Awards | Best Special/Digital Effects | Josep Maria Aragonés | Nominated | |
| 2011 | 3rd Gaudí Awards | Best Makeup and Hairstyles | Blanca Sánchez, Pepe Quetglas | Nominated | |
| 2011 | 25th Goya Awards | Best Supporting Actor | Álex Angulo | Nominated | |

== See also ==
- List of Spanish films of 2010
