= The Happets =

2010 Spanish animated film

The Happets in the Kingdom of the Sun
- Theatrical release poster
- Spanish: La tropa de trapo en el país donde siempre brilla el sol
- Directed by: Àlex Colls
- Written by: Lola Beccaria (script)
- Produced by: Àlex Colls
- Edited by: Guillermo Represa
- Music by: Zeltia Montes
- Production companies: Anera Films; Continental Animacion; Abano Productions
- Distributed by: Alta Classics
- Release dates: 22 June 2010 (Madrid); 29 October 2010 (Spain)
- Running time: 76 minutes
- Country: Spain
- Language: Spanish

The Happets in the Kingdom of the Sun (Spanish: La tropa de trapo en el país donde siempre brilla el sol, lit. 'The rag troop in the country where the sun always shines'; also shortened to La tròpa de trapo) is a 2010 Spanish animated film directed and produced by Àlex Colls from a script by Lola Beccaria, loosely based on a Catalan children's preschool show of the same name that aired on the Catalan TV3. It was released on 29 October 2010 in Spain, and won Best Animated Film at the 3rd Gaudí Awards.

== Premise ==
Mumu, a little cow, abandons her non-glam friends to become a star with very cool sheep, however, she soon comes to rue her decision.

== Release ==
The film had its world premiere at the 5th Madrid de Cine-Spanish Film Screenings in Madrid on 22 June 2010. It was released theatrically in Spain on 29 October 2010 by Alta Films.

=== Accolades ===
- Won Best Animated Film at the Gaudí Awards.
- Nominated for the Goya Award for Best Animated Film at the 25th Goya Awards.

== See also ==
- List of 3D films (2005 onwards)
