= 7 vidas =

Spanish TV sitcom

- Created by: Nacho García Velilla
- Starring: Amparo Baró; Toni Cantó; Paz Vega; Gonzalo de Castro; Anabel Alonso; Santi Millán; Blanca Portillo; Carmen Machi; Javier Cámara; Santi Rodríguez; Guillermo Toledo; María Pujalte; Eva Santolaria; Cristina Peña; Yolanda Ramos; Marina Gatell; Leandro Rivera; Pau Durá; Florentino Fernández
- Countries of origin: Spain; Italy
- No. of seasons: 15
- No. of episodes: 204

Production
- Running time: 30 minutes per episode

Original release
- Network: Telecinco
- Release: 17 January 1999 – 16 April 2006

Related
- Aída

7 Vidas is a Spanish television series set in Madrid that aired on Telecinco from 1999 to 2006. Its title translates as "7 Lives" and the symbol of the sitcom is a cat, in reference to the belief that cats have 7 Lives (in contrast to English-speaking countries, where they are believed to have nine lives).

Originally inspired by the American blockbuster Friends, it was not a big ratings hit initially, but over time, the show gained in popularity, ultimately becoming the most popular Spanish TV series of all time. By the end of its run, the show was totally different from its original source.

It was in 7 Vidas that the now internationally famous actress Paz Vega and Javier Cámara first became household names in Spain.

The sitcom tells the story of a group of friends in Madrid. David (Toni Cantó) awakes from a coma after more than 18 years, and starts discovering the new world in which he lives. His neighbour, Sole (Amparo Baró) is an old woman with a penchant for slapping round the back of the neck anyone who behaves in a way she dislikes. Her sexually frustrated son, Paco (Javier Cámara) is David's best friend, Carlota (Blanca Portillo) David's single sister and Laura (Laurita to her friends) (Paz Vega), their cousin from Seville (with her colourful Sevillian accent), initially Paco's principal love interest and then David's.

Characters came and went, and by the end of the sitcom the only character who had appeared in the first series and lasted until its end was Sole. Other long-standing characters, and the two most popular, in addition to Sole, were Gonzalo (Gonzalo de Castro), a waiter who later became a main character and Carlota's husband (although they were later divorced), and Diana (Anabel Alonso), a frustrated actress, and a naïve lesbian. She was the first homosexual character in Spanish television who did not follow stereotypes.

The script of the show was well known for poking fun at current events, politicians and celebrities and often contained a lot of risqué jokes.

Scenes were generally set in Sole's house, Carlota's house, or in Gonzalo's café "Casi Ke No" - the equivalent of Friends' Central Perk café. Like its inspiration, the cafe's name was a pun: the logo makes the expression, meaning "maybe not", appear to read "casino".

7 Vidas was also known for its multiple cameos of famous people, including Shakira, El Canto del Loco, politician Santiago Carrillo and footballer Samuel Eto'o. Hugh Grant was pencilled in to appear in one chapter, but the actor subsequently declined the offer.

By the show's final season, it had moved considerably away from its Friends inspiration, and celebrated its final, 204th, episode with a plot featuring all of the 19 main characters who had appeared over the series' history, including a video from Paz Vega, who was busy filming in the United States and unable to appear in person. A live performance of the main theme was also performed by El Canto del Loco, a Spanish pop group. The episode was recorded and transmitted live without interruptions, bar a few minutes for commercials, which were used to change clothes and represent the passing of the time.

ANT1 channel in Greece picked up the rights to 7 Vidas for a Greek remake of the show, premiering in its fall 2008 lineup and entitled 7 Zωές (7 Lives).

== Main ==
Actor	Character	Seasons														
Actor	Character	1	2	3	4	5	6	7	8	9	10	11	12	13	14	15
Toni Cantó	David Pérez Pérez	Main	Main	Main	Main	Main	—N/a	—N/a	Special Guest	—N/a	—N/a	—N/a	—N/a	—N/a	—N/a	Special Guest
Javier Cámara	Francisco "Paco" Gimeno Huete	Main	Main	Main	Main	Main	Main	Main	Guest	—N/a	—N/a	—N/a	—N/a	—N/a	—N/a	Guest
Blanca Portillo	Carlota Pérez Pérez	Main	Main	Main	Main	Main	Main	Main	Main	Main	Main	Main	Main	—N/a	—N/a	Guest
Amparo Baró	Soledad "Sole" Huete de Jaran	Main	Main	Main	Main	Main	Main	Main	Main	Main	Main	Main	Main	Main	Main	Main
Paz Vega	Laura Arteagabeitia Pérez	Main	Main	Main	Main	Special Guest	—N/a	—N/a	Special Guest	—N/a	—N/a	—N/a	—N/a	—N/a	Special Guest	Special Guest
Gonzalo de Castro	Gonzalo Montero / Antonio "Toni" Martínez López	—N/a	Recurring	Recurring	Recurring	Main	Main	Main	Main	Main	Main	Main	Main	Main	Main	Main
Guillermo Toledo	Ricardo "Ríchard" Sáez de Vidales	—N/a	Guest	Guest	Guest	—N/a	—N/a	—N/a	Main	Main	—N/a	—N/a	—N/a	—N/a	—N/a	—N/a
Anabel Alonso	Diana Freire	—N/a	—N/a	—N/a	Guest	Main	Main	Main	Main	Main	Main	Main	Main	Main	Main	Main
Marina Gatell	Esther Martín	—N/a	—N/a	—N/a	—N/a	—N/a	Main	Special Guest	—N/a	—N/a	—N/a	—N/a	—N/a	—N/a	—N/a	—N/a
Pau Durà	Alejandro "Álex" Cape	—N/a	—N/a	—N/a	—N/a	—N/a	Main	Main	—N/a	—N/a	—N/a	—N/a	—N/a	—N/a	—N/a	—N/a
Florentino Fernández	Félix Gimeno Huete	—N/a	—N/a	—N/a	—N/a	—N/a	—N/a	—N/a	Main	Main	—N/a	—N/a	—N/a	—N/a	—N/a	Special Guest
Eva Santolaria	Verónica "Vero" Montero	—N/a	—N/a	—N/a	—N/a	—N/a	—N/a	—N/a	Guest	Main	Main	Main	Main	Main	Main	Special Guest

== Spin-off Aída ==
The popularity of 7 vidas led in 2005 to a spin-off, Aída, which came to an end in 2014 after 237 episodes, surpassing the record of its parent series. It centred around Aída, a recurring supporting 7 vidas character, known for her vulgarity and for representing a "typical" working class Spanish woman. The series was set in a new context, with entirely new characters, though some characters from 7 vidas appeared in some episodes, and others, mentioned in 7 vidas but never shown, were introduced as regulars of the new show. In 2009, when Carmen Machi, the actress who played Aída, left the series, new characters appeared and the series continued under the same basic premise with, among others, Paco León.
