= Santi Rodríguez =

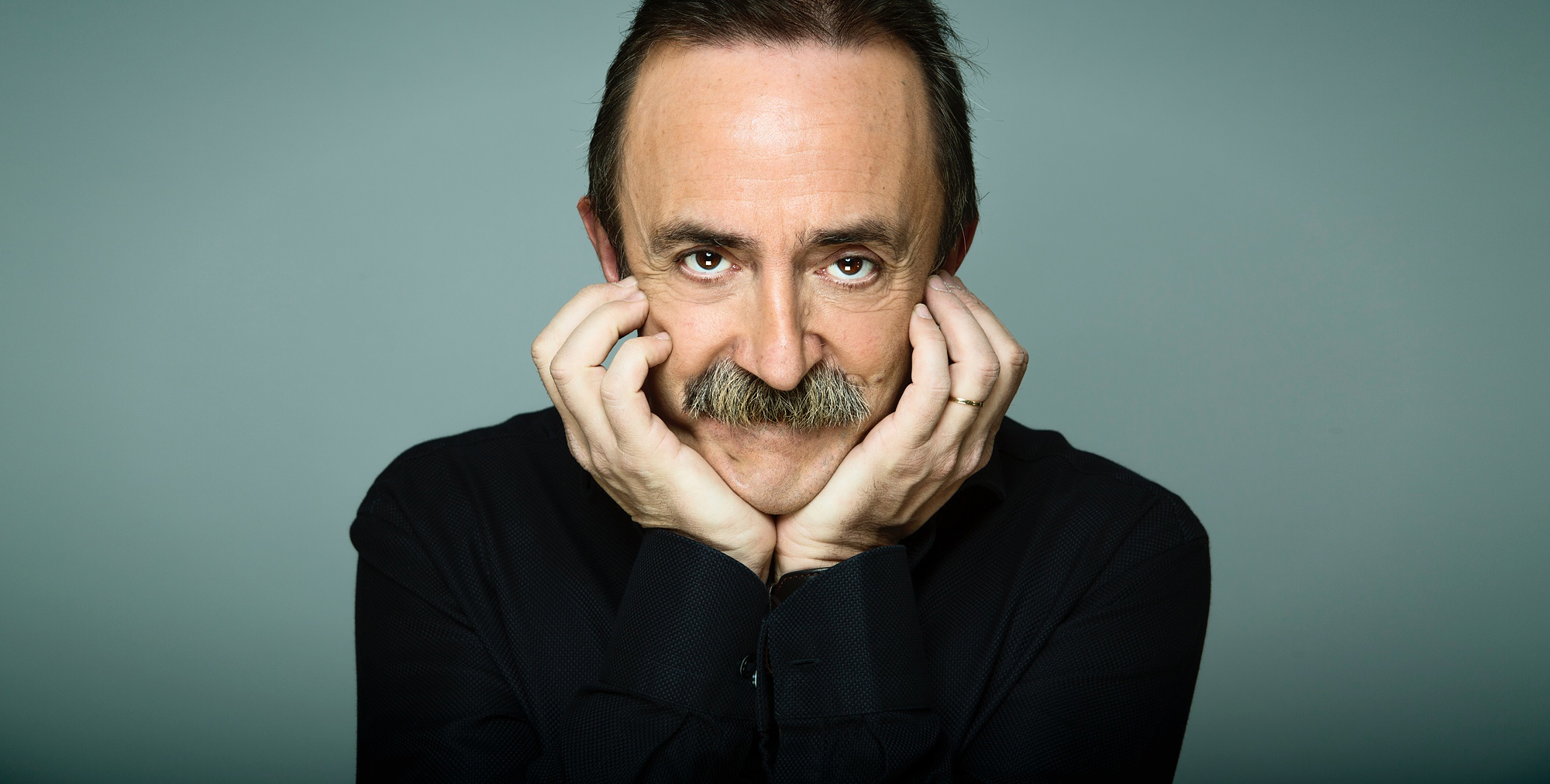
- Rodríguez, in 2008.
- Born: July 27, 1968 (age 57); Jaén, Spain
- Occupations: Actor, comedian

Santiago Rodríguez Ramiro (born 27 July 1968 in Jaén), professionally known as Santi Rodríguez, in a Spanish actor and comedian.

== Biography ==
He was born in Málaga, but after a month his family went to Jaén. He studied laws in the University of Granada, but he loved the comedia and the interpretation.

He achieved fame when he participated in El club de la comedia and was hired to participate in the TV series 7 vidas (where he interpreted El Frutero, the fruiterer). Also, he collaborated in the late night La Noche con Manel Fuentes y Compañía.

He starred in some theatre plays with the producer Globomedia (e.g. 5hombres.com).

He was sworn in the eighth edition of the TV program ¡Más que baile! (Telecinco).

He is collaborator an ambassador for the Down Syndrome Association of Jaen.
