= Anything You Want (film) =

- Theatrical release poster
- Spanish: Todo lo que tú quieras
- Directed by: Achero Mañas
- Written by: Achero Mañas
- Starring: Juan Diego Botto; José Luis Gómez; Ana Risueño; Pedro Alonso; Najwa Nimri; Alberto Jiménez; Ana Wagener; Paloma Lorena; Lucía Fernández
- Cinematography: David Omedes
- Edited by: José Manuel Jiménez
- Music by: Leiva
- Production companies: Bellatrix Films; Todo lo que tú quieras AIE
- Distributed by: Wanda Vision
- Release date: 10 September 2010
- Country: Spain

Anything You Want (Spanish: Todo lo que tú quieras) is a 2010 Spanish family drama film directed and written by Achero Mañas. The cast features Juan Diego Botto, José Luis Gómez, Ana Risueño, Pedro Alonso, Najwa Nimri and Lucía Fernández.

== Plot ==
Alicia, the mother figure of the Velasco family, dies in the wake of a seizure, leaving her widowed husband Leo (a homophobic and conservative lawyer) in charge of the 4 year-old Dafne. With support from Alex (a client), Pedro (a business associate) and Marta (a former girlfriend), Leo does his best to take care of his daughter. In order to please young Dafne, Leo is not averse to cross-dressing as a mother.

== Cast ==
- Juan Diego Botto as Leo
- José Luis Gómez as Alex
- Najwa Nimri as Marta
- Ana Risueño as Alicia
- Lucía Fernández as Dafne
- Pedro Alonso as Pedro
- Ana Wagener
- Alberto Jiménez
- Paloma Lorena

== Production ==
The film was produced by Bellatrix Films and Todo lo que tú quieras AIE, with the participation of TVE. Shooting took place in Madrid and lasted for seven weeks. Shooting locations in Madrid included the Centro, Moncloa-Aravaca, and Ciudad Lineal districts. David Omedes took over cinematography duties.

== Release ==
Distributed by Wanda Vision, Anything You Want was theatrically released in Spain on 10 September 2010. The film was also added to the lineup of the 35th Toronto International Film Festival's Contemporary World Cinema section.

== Reception ==
Andrea G. Bermejo of Cinemanía scored 4 out of 5 stars, deeming Anything You Want to be "an extremely risky film" (starting by the cast of a 4-year-old girl in a non-supporting role), considering the parent-child relationship featured in the film to be a "luminous" counterpart to the one present in Pellet, likewise writing that working mothers would love the film.

Pere Vall of Fotogramas also gave the film 4 out of 5 stars, assessing the risk (taken) and Juan Diego Botto to be the best things about the film, considering that the story grows as it sidesteps writing tropes, building its "own indomitable personality".

Jonathan Holland of Variety deemed the film to be "a searching, quietly subversive inquiry into family gender roles".

== Accolades ==
Year	Award	Category	Nominee(s)	Result	Ref.
2011	66th CEC Medals	Best Supporting Actor	José Luis Gómez	Nominated	

== See also ==
- List of Spanish films of 2010
