= Facto delafé y las flores azules =

Spanish indie pop and hip hop band

Delafé y las Flores Azules
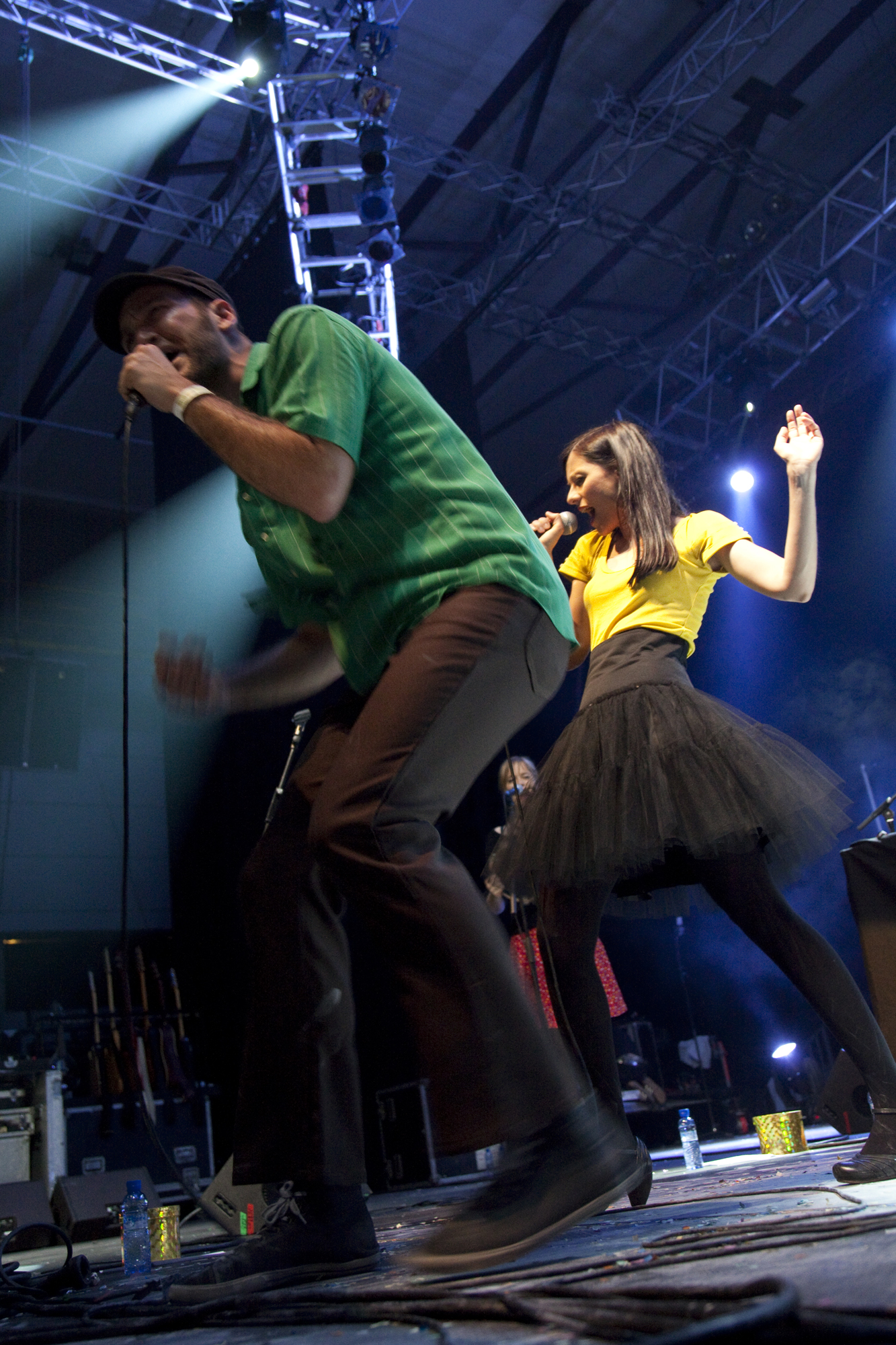
- Delafé y las flores azules at Escena BCN 2010

Background information
- Origin: Barcelona, Spain
- Genres: Indie pop, Trip hop, Hip hop
- Years active: 2003–present
- Labels: Music Bus/Warner Music
- Members: Oscar D'Aniello; Helena Miquel
- Past members: Marc Barrachina
- Website: Official site

Delafé y las Flores Azules (Spanish for "Delafé and the Blue Flowers") is a Spanish indie pop and hip hop band based in Barcelona (Spain), formerly known as Facto delafé y las flores azules.

The band was formed in November 2002 by Marc Barrachina "Facto" (former member of band Songstore) and Oscar D'Aniello "delafé" (also a member of Mishima). In June 2003, they started recording in a studio and in September of that year they won the Joven Promesa (Young Promise) contest organized by El Masnou. In May 2004, their song Mar el poder del Mar was chosen song of the month by RNE Radio 3 program Disco Grande. Helena Miquel "las flores azules", who made the chorus for the song, joined the band indefinitely. In January 2005, their demo El Monstruo de las Ramblas was chosen Best 2004 Demo by the listeners of Disco Grande. In November 2005, they released their first album, vs. El Monstruo de las Ramblas on the Music Bus label. By the end of 2006, they recorded several songs for Bigas Luna's Yo soy la Juani soundtrack. In October 2007, they released their second album, La Luz de la Mañana.

The music of Facto delafé y las flores azules is halfway between indie pop and hip hop, with melodies and structures more characteristic of rock, soul or electronic music. Although the lyrics contain a certain level of criticism, they are more poetic than aggressive.

== Discography ==
- Facto delafé y las flores azules vs. el monstruo de las ramblas (Music Bus, 2005)
- Facto delafé y las flores azules en la luz de la mañana (Warner Music Spain/Music Bus, 2007)
- Delafé y las Flores Azules vs. las trompetas de la muerte (Warner Music Spain, 2010)
- Delafé y las Flores Azules: "De ti sin mí - De mí sin ti (Warner Music Spain, 2013)
- Estonosepara (Warner Music Spain, 2014)
