= Buried (film) =

2010 film by Rodrigo Cortés

- Spanish theatrical release poster
- Directed by: Rodrigo Cortés
- Written by: Chris Sparling
- Produced by: Adrian Guerra; Peter Safran
- Starring: Ryan Reynolds
- Cinematography: Eduard Grau
- Edited by: Rodrigo Cortés
- Music by: Víctor Reyes
- Production companies: Versus Entertainment; The Safran Company; Dark Trick Films; Kinology; Studio 37
- Distributed by: Warner Bros. Pictures (Spain); Icon Film Distribution (UK/IRL/AU); Lionsgate (North America); Rézo Films (France)
- Release dates: 23 January 2010 (Sundance); 1 October 2010 (Spain)
- Running time: 95 minutes
- Countries: Spain; Australia; United States; France
- Language: English
- Budget: $2 million
- Box office: $21.3 million

Buried is a 2010 English-language survival psychological thriller film directed by Rodrigo Cortés. It stars Ryan Reynolds and was written by Chris Sparling.

The film follows Iraq-based American civilian truck driver Paul Conroy (Reynolds), who, after being attacked, finds himself buried alive in a wooden coffin, with only a lighter, flask, flashlight, knife, glowsticks, pen, pencil, and a mobile phone. Since its premiere at the 2010 Sundance Film Festival, the film has received a positive critical reception.

== Plot ==
On October 23, 2006, Paul Conroy, an American civilian working in Iraq, wakes up to find himself bound, gagged, and buried six feet underground in a wooden coffin with only a Zippo lighter in hand. As he struggles in his binds, he spies a nail in the coffin and uses it to free his hands. He tries to find an escape amidst his panic, yet the only thing he can see in the dark are his own feet.

After testing to see if he can push his way out of the coffin, he is startled by a missed call to a BlackBerry phone tucked near his ankles. He shuffles the phone to his hands and calls 911, where he is connected to an operator in Youngstown, Ohio (Rocha). She tries to get information from Conroy about his circumstances, and eventually concludes that she cannot help him from her location. He hangs up and tries to call home to be greeted by his own answering machine. He then attempts to call his wife, Linda (Mathis), at her cell phone. She does not pick up.

After a moment, Conroy tries to get ahold of the FBI by calling 411, where he is greeted by a particularly brisk operator (Birdsong) who chides him for losing his temper. She gives him the phone number to the Chicago field office, where he is connected to Special Agent Harris (Palladino). As Conroy pieces together what has happened to Harris, he recalls that he and several others in his convoy were ambushed by terrorists and that he passed out after being hit by a rock. Harris wastes Conroy's time by asking for his social security number, and as Conroy asks him what he needs the information for, the call drops.

Conroy reaches out to his employer, CRT, who had initially contracted him to come to Iraq. He is transferred to the voicemail of CRT's Director of Personnel, Alan Davenport (Tobolowsky), where Conroy tells him he believes he's trapped somewhere out near Baqubah in the province of Diyala. When the call drops again, Conroy launches into a fit of rage, and he thrashes against the walls of the coffin until he exhausts himself. In a pithy attempt to get help, Conroy tries the number he had missed a call from earlier—only to have his call answered by his kidnapper, Jabir (García Pérez).

Conroy tries to convince Jabir that he is not a soldier, but a truck driver working for CRT. Jabir refuses to believe him and demands that he pay a ransom of $5 million by 9:00 PM or he will be left in the coffin to die. In an effort to acquire the phone number to the State Department, he calls his sister-in-law Donna (Loughlin), whom he gets into a brief argument with. After explaining to her the gravity of his circumstances, she finally gives him the number, which he uses to reach to reach Rebecca Browning (Loughlin). Conroy pleads for the funds to pay his ransom and Browning tells him that, due to the government policy of not negotiating with terrorists, the State Department will not pay Jabir but will try to rescue him. She connects him with Dan Brenner (Paterson), head of the Hostage Working Group, who tells Conroy they are working as fast as they can to find him.

Jabir calls Conroy again to remind him that he is running out of time. He demands Conroy film himself reading a ransom note in a bag that Jabir left near his feet. Conroy insists that no one will pay $5 million for him, so Jabir drops the amount to $1 million and hangs up. As Conroy struggles to reach for the bag, distant explosions shake the area, which crack his coffin, causing it to slowly fill with sand. He successfully retrieves the bag after a great deal of effort, to find that the bag contains two glowsticks, a faulty flashlight, a folding knife, and the ransom note Jabir demanded he read. Conroy attempts to call home again to no avail.

Conroy calls Brenner again and shares Jabir's number, confessing to him that Jabir wants him to film a ransom video. Brenner advises Conroy to hold out for as long as he can, saying that he doesn't want Conroy's kidnapping to turn into "an international incident." Brenner tells him that dozens before him have been kidnapped like him, and only few have been successfully recovered. Conroy pleads for Brenner to recount any of the victims he's saved, and Brenner informs Conroy that a man named Mark White was rescued from a similar situation three weeks prior and is now home safe with his family. Conroy hangs up the call with a shred of relief, only to be startled by another call from Jabir, demanding the ransom video from him. This launches Conroy into a panic attack.

He takes a breather to swallow a handful of pills before calling Mountain View Nursing Home, where he speaks with his mom, Maryanne Conroy (Loughlin), who is suffering from memory loss. She tells him that she's been playing gin rummy with his father, and Conroy is forced to remind her that his father has passed away. He tries to get her to tell him that she loves him, but she doesn't take his cues and he hangs up. Shortly thereafter, Conroy misses a call from Jabir and receives a photo from him of Conroy's last colleague to survive the attack, Pamela Lutti (Miño), tied up in another location. Conroy calls Jabir to beg for a chance to save her, and Jabir gives him three minutes to send the video to him. Conroy finally caves and films himself reading Jabir's ransom note, which he sends off before falling asleep.

Conroy wakes up to the sensation of a kingsnake crawling down his leg. He attempts to set fire to the kingsnake by flicking lighter fluid onto it, but instead sets fire to the coffin. The kingsnake slithers away through a crack in the coffin as Conroy misses a call to his phone. He puts out the fire and lays in the dark, listening to someone singing a call to prayer over a PA in the distance as he realizes how to switch the language of his phone from Arabic to English. He uses the new settings to obtain his phone number, which he eagerly shares with Linda's voicemail. His joy is short-lived, however—despite his compliance in making the ransom video for Jabir, his kidnappers execute Lutti anyway and sends him video of her killing. Conroy throws up and contemplates suicide until he remembers the sound of his son's voice.

Conroy calls Brenner to accuse him of "playing babysitter" and tells him that he's figured out the number he's calling from. Brenner attempts to console him, but he is interrupted by the blasts heard earlier in the distance, which are now immediately overhead. They strike the ground around Conroy, causing major damage to the coffin that allows more sand to pour inside. As he attempts to repair the cracks in the splintering wood, Conroy finally receives a call from CRT's Alan Davenport, who calls to ensure that Conroy hasn't spoken to the media directly yet. After Conroy confirms that he hasn't made contact, Davenport switches on a recorder and informs him that he has been terminated from his job due to an alleged prohibited relationship with the deceased Pamela Lutti, which Conroy vehemently denies. However, despite his denial, Davenport informs him that CRT will not be held liable for any injuries that could happen to him, and that his family will not be receiving any death benefits if he doesn't make it out alive.

Conroy calls Brenner, who says that the explosions that damaged his coffin earlier were in fact F-16 bombings and that his kidnappers may have been killed. Brenner offers to track his signal again, but eventually admits that Conroy is a lost cause. Conroy hangs up, having lost hope, and makes a last will and testament in video form. In the video, he leaves his wife the $700 in his savings and the rest of his annuity and he leaves his son his clothes, taking time to apologize to Linda for not listening to her. Jabir calls a couple seconds later, demanding the $1 million from Conroy again. Since Conroy hasn't provided the funds yet, Jabir forces Conroy to record himself cutting off a finger, and threatens to harm Conroy's family back home if he refuses. Conroy tries to call Linda and Brenner unsuccessfully, and after rewatching Lutti's ransom video, Conroy complies with Jabir's demand.

As he loses blood from his severed finger, he imagines being rescued. Brenner interrupts his daydream to tell Conroy an insurgent has given details of where to find a man buried alive, and that they are driving out to rescue him. Conroy finally receives a tearful call from his wife Linda, and he assures her deliriously that he is going to be okay. As sand continues to fill the coffin to dangerous levels, giving Conroy seconds left to live, Brenner calls and tells him that he and the rescue team have arrived at the burial site. While Conroy can hear digging through the phone, he cannot hear any digging happening above him. The team digs up a coffin and opens it, but it is revealed with great shock that the insurgent led them to Mark White's coffin, the man Brenner claimed had been rescued. The film ends with Brenner profusely apologizing to Conroy as the sand fills the coffin completely. Conroy, having accepted his grim fate, suffocates to death.

== Cast ==
- Ryan Reynolds as Paul Conroy
- José Luis García Pérez (voice) as Jabir
- Robert Paterson (voice) as Dan Brenner
- Stephen Tobolowsky (voice) as Alan Davenport
- Cade Dundish (voice) as Shane Conroy
- Samantha Mathis (voice) as Linda Conroy
- Ivana Miño (voice) as Pamela Lutti
- Warner Loughlin (voice) as Maryanne Conroy / Donna Mitchell / Rebecca Browning
- Kali Rocha (voice) as 911 Operator
- Mary Birdsong (voice) as 411 Operator
- Erik Palladino (voice) as Special Agent Harris

== Production ==
The film was produced by Barcelona-based Versus Entertainment, in association with The Safran Company and Dark Trick Films. It was shot in Barcelona over 16 days.

Lead actor Ryan Reynolds stated that he suffered from claustrophobia while filming— much like the character he plays. The coffin he was in was gradually filled with sand as filming went on such that he was actually buried while shooting the film's climactic moments. Ryan described the last day of shooting as "unlike anything I experienced in my life, and I never ever want to experience that again." The production crew had a team of paramedics waiting on standby.

Director Rodrigo Cortés' inspirations included the Alfred Hitchcock films Rope and Lifeboat.

== Release ==
Buried premiered at the Sundance Film Festival on 23 January 2010. Shortly after, Lionsgate acquired North American distribution rights to the film after a bidding war with other distributors including Fox Searchlight Pictures and Screen Gems; the deal was initially estimated at $3.2 million, reports stated that the price would ultimately come to $10 million including Lionsgate's marketing commitments.

The film received a limited theatrical release in the United States on 24 September 2010 and a wider release two weeks later on 8 October. The film's first trailer premiered with A Nightmare on Elm Street. The second trailer premiered at the 2010 San Diego Comic-Con, and was attached with select prints of Dinner for Schmucks, Resident Evil: Afterlife, The Expendables and The Last Exorcism. Buried was released theatrically in Spain on 1 October 2010 by Warner Bros. Pictures.

The film won the Best European Feature Film of the Year award at the Strasbourg European Fantastic Film Festival in September 2010. It was presented at the Deauville American Film Festival, in competition, and the Toronto International Film Festival, out of competition, in September 2010.

== Critical reception ==
On review aggregation website Rotten Tomatoes, the film holds an approval rating of 87% based on 157 reviews with an average rating of 7.3/10. The site's critics consensus reads: "Wringing a seemingly impossible amount of gripping drama out of its claustrophobic premise, Buried is a nerve-wracking showcase for Ryan Reynolds' talent." Metacritic assigned the film a weighted average score of 65 out of 100 based on 29 critics, indicating "generally favorable reviews".

Film critic Roger Ebert awarded the film three and a half out of four stars and wrote that "Rodrigo Cortés, the Spanish filmmaker behind this diabolical, Hitchcock-influenced narrative stunt, makes merry mischief with camera angles and lighting". Scott Mantz of Access Hollywood called it "a brilliantly twisted suspense thriller that would have made Alfred Hitchcock proud." Chris Tilly at IGN gave the film a perfect 10 out of 10.

Peter Travers of Rolling Stone awarded the film two out of four stars, commenting: "Ninety minutes of being buried alive with Ryan Reynolds: Didn't we all suffer that in The Proposal?"

=== Industry reception ===
Film director John Waters named Buried as one of the ten best films of 2010, stating, "The most excruciatingly painful date movie imaginable comes complete with a very smart feel-bad ending. See it with someone you hate."

== Accolades ==
Award	Category	Subject	Result	Ref.
Gaudí Awards	Best Actor	Ryan Reynolds	Nominated	
Gaudí Awards	Best Visual Effects	Mònica Alarcón, María de la Cámara, Gabriel Paré and Àlex Villagrassa	Nominated	
Gaudí Awards	Best Art Direction	Maria de la Cámara and Gabriel Paré	Nominated	
Gaudí Awards	Best Editing	Rodrigo Cortés	Won	
Gaudí Awards	Best Director	Rodrigo Cortés	Nominated	
Gaudí Awards	Best Sound	Urko Garai, James Muñoz, Marc Orts	Nominated	
Gaudí Awards	Best Original Screenplay	Chris Sparling	Nominated	
Gaudí Awards	Best Film in non-Catalan language	Adrián Guerra and Peter Safran	Won	
Goya Awards	Best Film	Buried	Nominated	
Goya Awards	Best Director	Rodrigo Cortés	Nominated	
Goya Awards	Best Original Screenplay	Chris Sparling	Won	
Goya Awards	Best Actor	Ryan Reynolds	Nominated	
Goya Awards	Best Cinematography	Eduard Grau	Nominated	
Goya Awards	Best Editing	Rodrigo Cortés	Won	
Goya Awards	Best Original Score	Víctor Reyes	Nominated	
Goya Awards	Best Original Song	"In the Lap of the Mountain" by Rodrigo Cortés and Víctor Reyes	Nominated	
Goya Awards	Best Sound	Urko Garai, James Muñoz, Marc Orts	Won	
Goya Awards	Best Special Effects	Gabriel Paré, Àlex Villagrasa	Nominated	
IGN Movie Award	Best Performance	Ryan Reynolds	Nominated	
Méliès International Festivals Federation	Méliès d'Or		Won	
MTV Movie Award	Best Scared-As-S**t Performance	Ryan Reynolds	Nominated	
National Board of Review Award	Best Original Screenplay	Chris Sparling	Won	
Saturn Award	Best Actor	Ryan Reynolds	Nominated	
Fangoria Chainsaw Awards	Best Actor	Ryan Reynolds	Won	
Fangoria Chainsaw Awards	Best Limited-Release/Direct-to-Video Film		Nominated	
Fangoria Chainsaw Awards	Best Screenplay	Chris Sparling	Nominated	
Fangoria Chainsaw Awards	Best Score	Víctor Reyes	Nominated	
Strasbourg European Fantastic; Film Festival Award	Best European Film	Adrián Guerra and Peter Safran	Won	

== See also ==
- Survival film, about the film genre, with a list of related films
- List of Spanish films of 2010
- Locke, 2013 British film with Tom Hardy as the only on-screen character, driving a car while he talks to others via speakerphone
