= Àlex Monner =

Spanish actor (born 1995)

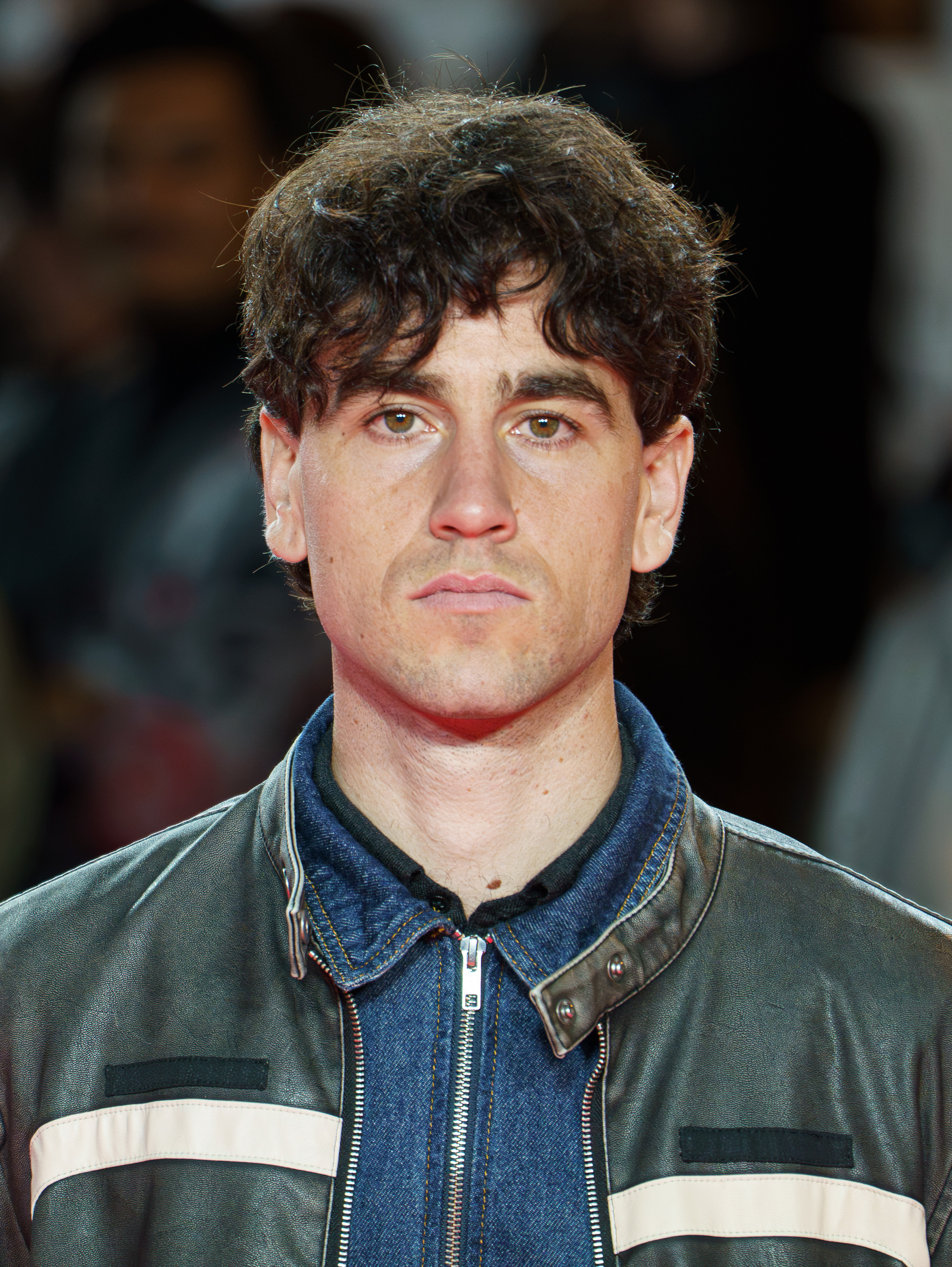
- Monner in 2025
- Born: Alejandro Monner Zubizarreta; 27 January 1995 (age 31); Barcelona, Spain
- Occupation: Actor
- Years active: 2010–present
- Known for: Polseres vermelles
- Awards: Best actor Gaudí 2013

Àlex Monner Zubizarreta (born 27 January 1995) is a Spanish actor. He is known for his role as Lleó in the Catalan television series Polseres vermelles.

Monner was born in Barcelona. He debuted in Pau Freixa's film Herois, and then had a television role in the TV3 series Polseres vermelles, scripted by Albert Espinosa and again directed by Freixa. He played Lleó, a young man who lost a leg because of cancer.

In 2012, he featured in REC 3: Génesis as Adrián.

He has collaborated with Freixas several times in recent years, in the Telecinco series Sé quién eres, the first Spanish drama to be shown on the BBC, and in Cites, the Catalan version of the British series Dates.

He has appeared in roles on Televisió de Catalunya, TNT, Antena 3, the Telefe channel of Argentina, and Monte Carlo TV of Uruguay.

== Filmography ==
=== Feature films ===
| Year | Title | Character | Director | Notes | Ref. |
|---|---|---|---|---|---|
| 2010 | Héroes (Heroes) | Ekaitz | Pau Freixas | Leading role | |
| 2012 | REC 3: Génesis | Adrián | Paco Plaza | Supporting | |
| 2012 | Els nens salvatges (The Wild Ones) | Àlex | Patricia Ferreira | Leading role | |
| 2013 | Barcelona, nit d'estiu (Barcelona, Summer Night) | Jordi | Dani de la Orden | Leading role | |
| 2014 | La fossa | Adrià | Pere Vilà i Barceló | Leading role | |
| 2014 | Marsella | Nacho | Belén Macías | Supporting | |
| 2015 | Summer Camp | Marcos | Alberto Marini | Cast | |
| 2015 | Solo química | El Tirillas | Alfonso Albacete | Supporting | |
| 2015 | L'artèria invisible | Dani | Pere Vilá i Barceló | Leading role | |
| 2015 | La propera pell (The Next Skin) | Gabriel | Isaki Lacuesta | Leading role | |
| 2018 | Life Itself | Rodrigo | Dan Fogelman | | |
| 2020 | Gang | | Alex Sardà | Short film | |
| 2021 | El cover (The Cover) | Dani | Secun de la Rosa | | |
| 2022 | Centauro | | | | |

=== Television ===
| Year | Title | Character | Director | Channel | Notes |
|---|---|---|---|---|---|
| 2011–13 | Polseres vermelles | Lleó | Pau Freixas | TV3 | Leading role (28 chapters) |
| 2014 | El cas dels catalans | Felip V | Ventura Durall | TV3 | Leading role (TV movie) |
| 2015 | Cites | Isma | Pau Freixas | TV3 | |
| 2016 | Sé quién eres | Pol | Pau Freixas | Telecinco | |
| 2018 | Vivir sin permiso (Unauthorized Living) | Carlos Bandeira | Marc Vigil | Telecinco | |
| 2021 | Elite: historias breves: Phillipe Caye Felipe | Felipe Ciprian | Carlos Montero | Netflix | Main cast, 3 episodes |
| 2022 | Elite | Felipe Ciprian | Carlos Montero | Netflix | Recurring cast, 3 episodes (season 5) |

=== Theatre ===
- Jo mai, of Iván Morales. Dir.: Iván Morales. Festival Grec (2013). Teatre Lliure (2014)

== Awards and nominations ==
Goya Awards

| Year | Category | Film | Result |
|---|---|---|---|
| 2012 | Goya Award for Best New Actor | Los niños salvajes | Nominated |

- Spanish Movies Festival of Málaga: Biznaga of Silver to the best cast actor because of Los niños salvajes (2012).
- Gaudí Awards Winner the best revelation actor Els nens salvatges (2013)
- Fotogramas Awards Winner the best TV actor for his role as Lléo in Polseres Vermelles (2013)
- Turia Awards Winner the best revelation actor Els nens salvatges (2013)
- Cinematographic Writers' Circle CEC Awards Nominated to the best revelation actor Els nens salvatges (2013)

== Bibliography ==
- http://www.elperiodico.cat/ca/noticias/tele/20110207/alex-monner-quan-vaig-arribar-casa-rapat-meva-mare-plorar/694120.shtml
- https://www.imdb.com/name/nm3856284/
- http://www.antena3.com/series/pulseras-rojas/noticias/descubriendo-alex-monner-joven-promesa-cine-television_2012071200067.html
