= Sé quién eres (TV series) =

Spanish television drama series

- Also known as: I Know Who You Are
- Genre: Drama; Mystery; Psychological thriller
- Created by: Pau Freixas
- Directed by: Pau Freixas
- Starring: Francesc Garrido; Blanca Portillo; Aida Folch; Nancho Novo
- No. of seasons: 1
- No. of episodes: 16

Production
- Production location: Province of Barcelona
- Running time: 70 minutes approx.
- Production company: Mediaset España

Original release
- Network: Telecinco
- Release: January 16 – May 1, 2017

Sé quién eres (English: I Know Who You Are) is a single-season, 16-episode Spanish television drama series created by Pau Freixas for Telecinco. It premiered on January 16, 2017 and stars Blanca Portillo, Francesc Garrido, Carles Francino, Eva Santolaria and Aida Folch. The series was given the highest rating for TV fiction in 2017 by the WIT at MIPTV. The series was shot in Barcelona and its metropolitan area.

== Plot ==
The series revolves around Juan Elías, a prestigious lawyer who suffers a complete loss of memory after what seems to be a car crash. With the help of his wife, Judge Alicia Castro, he tries to reconstruct the events when the vehicle is found; but things take a darker turn when traces of the blood of Ana Saura, a niece of Juan who has been missing for days, are found in it. Ana's father, Ramón, tries to prove Juan has killed her and hires a private legal firm which includes a female lawyer Eva Duran who was the lover of Juan Elias. The series is based in Barcelona, contains many descriptions of the Spanish legal system and concentrates on the bonds of love, friendship and family.

== Cast ==
=== Main ===
- Francesc Garrido as Juan Elías
- Blanca Portillo as Alicia Castro
- Àlex Monner as Pol Elías
- Susana Abaitua as Ana Saura
- Martiño Rivas as Marc Castro
- Aida Folch as Eva Durán
- Nancho Novo as Ramón Saura
- Pepón Nieto as Alberto Giralt
- Eva Santolaria as Marta Hess
- Carles Francino as David Vila
- Antonio Dechent as Ricardo Heredia
- Mar Sodupe as Silvia Castro
- Noa Fontanals as Julieta Elías
- Blanca Apilánez as Judge Muñoz
- Montse Germán as Susana Martín
- Montserrat Carulla as Eva's grandmother
- Nausicaa Bonnín as Charry

=== Secondary/guest ===
- Diana Gómez as Mónica
- Susana Bequer as Cristina Guerrero
- Biel Durán as Adrián
- Carlos Olalla as Prosecutor Sales
- Pep Ferrer as Flavà
- Txell Aixendri as Chloe
- Jordi García as a gas station employee
- Jordi Buch as Dr. Cervera
- David Cantero as himself
- Julius Cotter as Dr. Van der Meyde

== Episodes ==
No.	Title	Directed by	Original release date	Spain viewers (millions)	Viewers share
1	"Kilómetro cero"	Pau Freixas	January 16, 2017	3.176	18.9%
2	"Memoria selectiva"	Pau Freixas	January 23, 2017	2.777	15.9%
3	"Matar al padre"	Pau Freixas	January 30, 2017	2.533	15.9%
4	"La ley de la permanencia"	Pau Freixas	February 6, 2017	2.753	17%
5	"La habitación 218"	Silvia Quer	February 13, 2017	2.483	15.1%
6	"Secretos del pasado"	Silvia Quer	February 20, 2017	2.350	15.3%
7	"Punto de no retorno"	Jorge Coira	February 27, 2017	2.089	13.1%
8	"La pista falsa"	Jorge Coira	March 6, 2017	2.428	15.2%
9	"Mil veces mejor que tú"	Joaquín Llamas	March 13, 2017	2.496	15.5%
10	"Necesito ayuda"	Joaquín Llamas	March 20, 2017	2.258	15.8%
11	"La vida en un suspiro"	Pau Freixas	March 27, 2017	2.283	13.6%
12	"Duda razonable"	Joaquín Llamas	April 3, 2017	2.233	14.2%
13	"El precio del silencio"	Pau Freixas	April 10, 2017	2.092	14%
14	"Julieta"	Joaquín Llamas	April 17, 2017	2.106	14.1%
15	"La esposa abandonada"	Joaquín Llamas	April 24, 2017	2.307	15.4%
16	"El factor de la culpabilidad"	Pau Freixas	May 1, 2017	2.118	14.5%

== International broadcast ==
On April 9, 2017, the series premiered in Poland on Ale Kino+ under the title Wiem, kim jesteś (I Know Who You Are). In the United Kingdom the BBC acquired the rights to air the series under the title I Know Who You Are. The first ten episodes series premiered on July 15, 2017 on BBC Four and finished in September 2017. The final six episodes were shown in November 2017. In The Netherlands, a remake was created under the title Ik weet wie je bent (I Know Who You Are), for the Dutch public broadcaster KRO-NCRV on NPO 3. The first episode aired on 26 August 2018.
