= The Impossible Language =

- Theatrical release poster
- Spanish: El idioma imposible
- Directed by: Rodrigo Rodero
- Screenplay by: Michel Gaztambide; Rodrigo Rodero
- Based on: El idioma imposible by Francisco Casavella
- Produced by: Raquel Colera; Xabier Berzosa; Iñigo Obeso
- Starring: Andrés Gertrúdix; Irene Escolar; Helena Miquel; Isabel Ampudia; Tony Zenet; Juanlu Escudero; Karra Elejalde
- Cinematography: Luis Bellido
- Edited by: Fernando Franco
- Music by: José Sánchez-Sanz
- Production companies: Skapada Films; Irusoin; Pato Films; Marela Films; Encanta Films
- Distributed by: Barton Films
- Release dates: 20 April 2010 (Málaga); 26 November 2010 (Spain)
- Country: Spain
- Language: Spanish

The Impossible Language (Spanish: El idioma imposible) is a 2010 Spanish drama film directed by Rodrigo Rodero from a screenplay by Rodero and Michel Gaztambide based on the novel by Francisco Casavella which stars Andrés Gertrúdix, Irene Escolar, and Helena Miquel.

== Plot ==
Set in 1980 in El Raval, the plot follows drug dealer Fernando, who comes across self-destructive and heroin-addicted Elsa, whom with he enters a relationship. Fascinated by her, Fernando abandons her nonetheless and begins a relationship with artist Victoria.

== Cast ==
- Andrés Gertrúdix as Fernando
- Irene Escolar as Elsa
- Helena Miquel as Victoria
- Isabel Ampudia as La Negra
- Tony Zenet
- Juanlu Escudero
- Karra Elejalde as camarero
- Roger Pera as Antonio

== Production ==
The screenplay was penned by Michel Gaztambide and Rodrigo Rodero. It adapts Francisco Casavella's novel El idioma imposible, part of the book trilogy El día del Watusi. The film is a Skapada Films, Irusoin, Pato Films, Marela Films, and Encanta Films production, with backing from ETB, TV3, ICAA, and Junta de Comunidades de Castilla-La Mancha. Shooting locations included Barcelona, Girona, and Madrid.

== Release ==
The film was presented at the Málaga Film Festival on 20 April 2010. Distributed by Barton Films, it was released theatrically in Spain on 26 November 2010.

== Reception ==
Jonathan Holland of Variety deemed The Impossible Language to be "a striking if uneven first film for Rodrigo Rodero", with a "quietly seductive" "blend of grunge and lyricism".

== See also ==
- List of Spanish films of 2010
