= Among Wolves (2010 film) =

2010 Spanish adventure-drama film

- Theatrical release poster
- Spanish: Entrelobos
- Directed by: Gerardo Olivares
- Screenplay by: Gerardo Olivares
- Produced by: José María Morales
- Starring: Juan José Ballesta; Sancho Gracia; Carlos Bardem; Alex Brendemühl; Dafne Fernández; Eduardo Gómez; Antonio Dechent; Luisa Martín; Vicente Romero; José Manuel Soto; Agustín Rodríguez; Francisco Conde; Manuel Camacho
- Cinematography: Oscar Durán
- Edited by: Iván Aledo
- Music by: Klaus Badelt
- Production companies: Wanda Visión; Arakako Films; Sophisticated Films
- Distributed by: Wanda Visión
- Release date: 26 November 2010 (Spain)
- Countries: Spain; Germany
- Language: Spanish

Among Wolves (Spanish: Entrelobos) is a 2010 adventure drama film written and directed by Gerardo Olivares. It is based on the true story of feral child Marcos Rodríguez Pantoja.

== Cast ==
- Manuel Camacho as Marcos (child)
- Juan José Ballesta as Marcos (adult)
- Sancho Gracia as Atanasio
- Carlos Bardem as Ceferino
- Àlex Brendemühl as Balilla
- Dafne Fernández as Pizquilla
- Eduardo Gómez as Caragorda
- Luisa Martín as Isabel
- Antonio Dechent as sergeant
- Marcos Rodríguez Pantoja as himself
- Vicente Romero as Hocicotocino
- José Manuel Soto
- Francisco Conde
- Agustín Rodríguez

== Reception ==
Jonathan Holland of Variety write about a "simply told, visually sumptuous take on a boy's years spent living alone in the Spanish wild in the 1960s".

== Accolades ==
- 2011: 25th Goya Awards, Manuel Camacho nominated for Best New Actor
- 2011: White Camel Award, Sahara International Film Festival

== See also ==
- List of Spanish films of 2010
