= Plans for Tomorrow =

- Theatrical release poster
- Spanish: Planes para mañana
- Directed by: Juana Macías
- Written by: Juana Macías; Juan Moreno; Alberto Bermejo
- Produced by: Guillermo Sempere
- Starring: Carme Elías; Goya Toledo; Ana Labordeta; Aura Garrido
- Cinematography: Guillermo Sempere
- Edited by: Juana Macías; Yago Muñiz
- Music by: Ignacio Pérez Marín
- Production companies: Teoponte PC; Monte Film; Viernes Producciones
- Distributed by: A Contracorriente Films
- Release dates: 18 April 2010 (FMCE); 19 November 2010 (Spain)
- Country: Spain
- Language: Spanish

Plans for Tomorrow (Spanish: Planes para mañana) is a 2010 Spanish drama film directed by Juana Macías (her feature debut). The cast features Carme Elias, Goya Toledo, Ana Labordeta and Aura Garrido.

== Plot ==
Set in an indeterminate Spanish city, the plot follows four women at a time their lives are facing radical changes.

== Cast ==
- Goya Toledo as Inés
- Carme Elias as Antonia
- Ana Labordeta as Marian
- Aura Garrido as Mónica
- Christophe Miraval as Alberto
- Brendan Price as Bryan
- Pablo Viña as Ernesto
- Jorge Bosch as Julio
- Adrián Marín as Raúl
- Maite Blasco as madre de Inés

== Production ==
The film was produced by Teoponte PC, Monte Film and Viernes Producciones, with support from Junta de Extremadura. Shooting locations included the city of Cáceres, in Extremadura.

== Release ==
On 18 April 2010, the film screened at the Málaga Spanish Film Festival (FMCE), where it was met with acclaim. Distributed by A Contracorriente Films, it was theatrically released in Spain on 19 November 2010.

== Reception ==
Jonathan Holland of Variety deemed the film to be "a quietly engrossing debut for helmer/co-writer Juana Macias that unpacks the crosscut lives of four women in crisis".

Reviewing for El País, Javier Ocaña considered the film to be a "notable debut" for Macías, highlighting as virtues the subtlety of the script, the magnificent performances, and the agile staging.

Both Ocaña and Holland observed a resemblance in several ways to the 2000 film Amores perros (which also stars Goya Toledo).

Fausto Fernández of Fotogramas gave the film 3 out of 5 stars, highlighting the teen contrast offered by Aura Garrido's performance, whereas he cited the presence of egalitarian cliches as a negative point.

== Accolades ==
| Year | Award | Category | Nominee(s) | Result | Ref. |
|---|---|---|---|---|---|
| 2010 | 13th Málaga Spanish Film Festival | Silver Biznaga for Best Direction | Juana Macías | Won | |
| 2010 | 13th Málaga Spanish Film Festival | Silver Biznaga for Best Supporting Actress | Aura Garrido | Won | |
| 2010 | 13th Málaga Spanish Film Festival | Silver Biznaga for Best New Screenwriter | Juana Macías, Juan Moreno, Alberto Bermejo | Won | |
| 2011 | 25th Goya Awards | Best New Director | Juana Macías | Nominated | |
| 2011 | 25th Goya Awards | Best New Actress | Aura Garrido | Nominated | |
| 2011 | 20th Actors and Actresses Union Awards | Best New Actress | Aura Garrido | Nominated | |

== See also ==
- List of Spanish films of 2010
