= Helena Miquel =

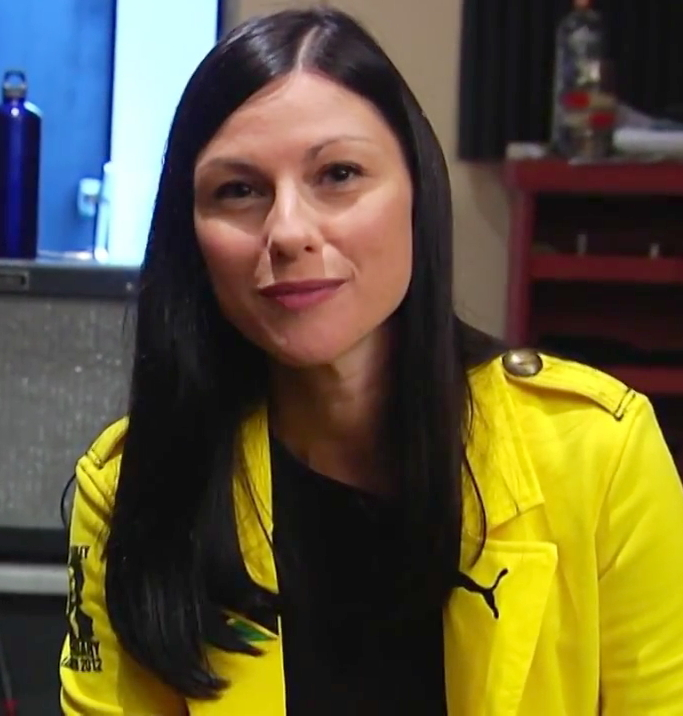
Miquel in 2014

Helena Miquel (born 1972) is a journalist, singer, and actress from Barcelona.

Miquel was born in Barcelona in 1972. In addition to her artistic career, she has worked in Catalunya Ràdio. From a musical standpoint, she has been a member of Delafé y las flores azules (along with Oscar D'Aniello) and indie-pop band Élena. Miquel left Delafé in 2015, but the group was reunited in 2022. She made her solo debut with El sol en la sombra in 2017.

Miquel became involved with the film industry upon composing four songs for My Name Is Juani (2006). After her film acting debut in The Impossible Language (2010) as Victoria, she has featured in acting roles in films such as No Rest for the Wicked (2011) as Judge Chacón, and Close Your Eyes (2023), and in the Catalan soap opera La Riera as Tània.
