= Rodrigo Cortés =

Spanish filmmaker

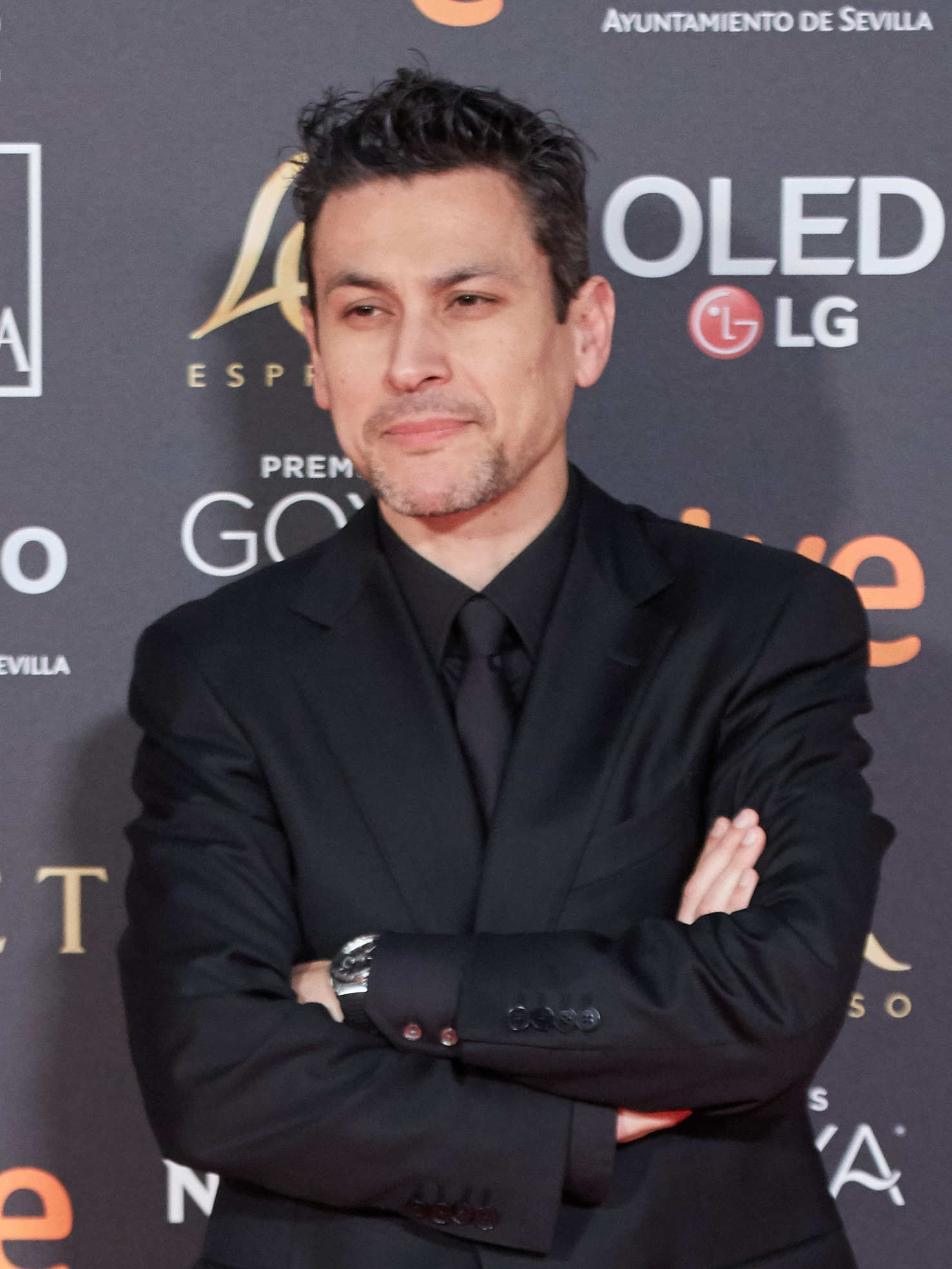
- At the 33rd Goya Awards in 2019
- Born: Rodrigo Cortés Giráldez; 31 May 1973 (age 52); Cenlle, Galicia, Spain
- Occupations: Film director, producer, screenwriter, editor, actor

Rodrigo Cortés Giráldez (born 31 May 1973) is a Spanish film director, producer, screenwriter, editor, writer and occasional actor. He is best known for directing the 2010 psychological thriller Buried.

== Early life ==
Rodrigo Cortés was born in Pazos Hermos (Cenlle, province of Ourense) on 31 May 1973, but soon moved to Salamanca, where he spent most of his childhood and his early 20s.

== Career ==
Cortés's fondness for filmmaking started at an early age. At 16, he had already directed his first short film in Super 8. In 1998, he directed the short Yul that won over 20 awards and in 2001, he released 15 Days, a fake documentary in the form of a large short film that earned over 57 awards at festivals, becoming the most awarded Spanish short film of the time.

In 2007, he directed The Contestant, his first feature film that was released with critical applause and earned several awards, including the Critic's prize at the Málaga Film Festival. He directed and edited the 2010 thriller Buried, starring Ryan Reynolds. The film premiered at the Sundance Film Festival, and has received considerable acclaim.

In 2012 Cortés released Red Lights, a film about a physicist and a psychology professor who specialise in debunking supernatural phenomena, it stars Robert De Niro, Sigourney Weaver, Cillian Murphy and Elizabeth Olsen.

He reunited with Buried screenwriter Chris Sparling for his 2018 movie Down a Dark Hall, based on the novel of the same name by Lois Duncan and produced by Twilight writer Stephenie Meyer.

== Philosophy ==
In a 2012 interview, following the release of Red Lights, Cortés explained his perspective on independent filmmaking in an online interview:

... I don’t believe in indie or studio as labels. As an audience member, what I want is to hear strong voices and clear personalities and to feel challenged; not to feel reaffirmed on my own decisions or whatever... it’s never about where you shoot. It’s about what and about how. I mean that. This is not a pro-Hollywood or anti-Hollywood position. I learned to love cinema via the studio movies and of course Scorsese films, Spielberg films, and Hitchcock. All of them did studio pictures with very strong voices. It’s about finding this margin of expressing and exploring the things that touch your sensitive points.

== Filmography ==
=== Film ===
Year	Title	Director	Writer	Producer	Editor	Musical director	Notes
2007	The Contestant	Yes	Yes	No	Yes	Yes	Also songwriter: "Cyrus Honey Blues" and "Cajas"
2010	Buried	Yes	No	Executive	Yes	Yes	Also songwriter: "In the Lap of the Mountain"
2011	Apartment 143	No	Yes	Yes	Yes	Yes	Also Music editor and second unit director
2012	Red Lights	Yes	Yes	Yes	Yes	Yes	
2013	Grand Piano	No	No	Yes	Uncredited	No	Also second unit director
2018	Down a Dark Hall	Yes	No	No	Yes	Yes	Also additional voices (credited as Gonzalo Giráldez)
2021	Love Gets a Room	Yes	Yes	Executive	Yes	Yes	Also songwriter "Without You", "Little Bride" and "Little Bride-Stefcia Solo"
2024	Escape	Yes	Yes	Yes	Yes	Yes	

=== Short films ===
Year	Title	Director	Writer	Producer	Editor	Notes
1998	Yul	Yes	Yes	Yes	Yes	
2000	15 días	Yes	Yes	Yes	Yes	Also composer
2000	La Ley de Murphy	No	No	No	Yes	Also dialogue supervisor
2001	Dentro	Yes	Yes	No	Yes	Segment of Diminutos del calvario Also composer and sound designer
2002	Los 150 metros de Callao	Yes	Yes	Yes	Yes	Also sound, sound designer and sound editor
2003	El Niño Millon	Yes	No	No	No	Documentary short film Co-directed with Abril Balderrama and Ricardo Díaz
2003	Interruptus	No	No	No	Yes	Also dialogue supervisor
2007	Dirt Devil	Yes	Yes	Yes	Yes	Also sound designer and sound editor
2007	Impavido	No	No	No	Yes	Aldo dialogue supervisor
2010	Alone	No	Original Idea	No	No	
2013	Por activa y por pasiva	Yes	Yes	Yes	Yes	
2014	1:58	Yes	Yes	No	Yes	Advertising short
2022	Tierra Nueva	Yes	No	No	No	Advertising short

Acting roles

Year	Title	Role
1998	Yul	Narrador (as "Gonzalo Giraldez")
2000	15 días	Ruben Salas
2000	La Ley de Murphy	El Holandés (voice)
2002	Los 150 metros de Callao	Narrador #1 (voice)
2003	Interruptus	Hombre Calvo #1
2007	Dirt Devil	Narrador

=== Television ===
Year	Title	Director	Writer	Editor	Musical Director	Notes
2021	Stories to Stay Awake	Yes	Yes	Yes	Yes	Wrote, directed, edited and produced music for episode "La Broma"; Co-wrote and co-edited episode "El Asfalto"

== Awards and nominations ==
Year	Work	Award	Category	Result	Ref.
2000	15 Days	Ourense Independent Film Festival	Canal+ Audience Award	Won	
2000	15 Days	Alcalá de Henares Short Film Fesrtival	Pixel Coop Award - Special Mention	Won	
2000	15 Days	Zaragoza Film Festival	Best Editing	Won	
2001	15 Days	Medina Film Festival	Youth Jury Award	Won	
2001	15 Days	Medina Film Festival	Best Editing	Won	
2001	15 Days	L'Alfàs del Pi Film Festival	Best Short Film	3rd award	
2007	The Contestant	Málaga Film Festival	Golden Biznaga for Best Spanish Film	Nominated	
2007	The Contestant	Málaga Film Festival	Critic's Award	Won	
2008	The Contestant	Goya Awards	Best Original Song for "Circus Honey Blues"	Nominated	
2008	The Contestant	Mestre Mateo Awards	Best Director	Nominated	
2008	The Contestant	Mestre Mateo Awards	Best Screenplay	Nominated	
2008	The Contestant	Mestre Mateo Awards	Best Editing	Won	
2010	Buried	Méliès International Festivals Federation	Méliès d'Or	Won	
2011	Buried	Gaudí Awards	Best Director	Nominated	
2011	Buried	Gaudí Awards	Best Editing	Won	
2011	Buried	CEC Medals	Best Director	Nominated	
2011	Buried	CEC Medals	Best Editing	Won	
2011	Buried	Goya Awards	Best Director	Nominated	
2011	Buried	Goya Awards	Best Editing	Won	
2011	Buried	Goya Awards	Best Original Song for "In the lap of the mountain"	Nominated	
2013	Red Lights	Gaudí Awards	Best Non-Catalan Language Film	Nominated	
2014	Grand Piano	Feroz Awards	Best Drama	Nominated	
2014	Grand Piano	Gaudí Awards	Best Non-Catalan Language Film	Nominated	
2015	Grand Piano	Saturn Awards	Best Independent Film	Nominated	
2022	Love Gets a Room	Feroz Awards	Best Director	Won	
2022	Love Gets a Room	Feroz Awards	Best Screenplay	Nominated	
2022	Love Gets a Room	CEC Medals	Best Director	Won	
2022	Love Gets a Room	CEC Medals	Best Original Screenplay	Won	
2022	Love Gets a Room	CEC Medals	Best Editing	Won	
