= Hostage Working Group =

Hostage Working Group was organized by the U.S. Department of State at the US Embassy in Baghdad in the summer of 2004 to monitor hostages in Iraq. Reported as meeting "weekly to bring together officials from the FBI, the Defense Department, the State Department and the Iraqi government. Officials do not publicly discuss the actions they can take against kidnappers."1

In an interview in the magazine, Talk Through, of the UK's Ministry of Defence Police, April/May 2005, PC Peter Anderson, who was working with the Hostage Working Group (HWG) describes himself as: "the only non-American in this 30-strong group."

Erik Rye was identified as the director of the Hostage Working Group at the US Embassy in Baghdad in an editorial 3 in the International Herald Tribune on May 17, 2006. Rye's work in Baghdad was featured in the book "The Forever War" by Dexter Filkins. He then became the Advisor for Hostage Affairs for the U.S. State Department. That position was replaced by the Special Presidential Envoy for Hostage Affairs (SPEHA). Based in part on his experiences in Baghdad, he went on to author a book that addressed the underpinnings of extremist violence and existential conflict, called "Death Sickness and the Need to Believe".

Rye wrote an Op-Ed in the New York Times in May 2006 while director of the hostage working groups that provided details about the nature of kidnappings in Iraq A similar story appeared in the New York Times, also in May, 2006, that provided additional details about the tactics of hostage crises. Rye was also cited in a 2007 State Department publication, written by a State Department translator.

A statement issued September 7, 2006 by the White House 4 identified another group working out of the US Embassy in Baghdad, the Office of Hostage Affairs. This is an alternative name for the Hostage Working Group.
