= Eva Santolaria =

Spanish actress

- Born: 2 May 1975 (age 51); Barcelona, Spain
- Occupation: Actress
- Years active: 1996-presents

Eva Santolaria Millán (born 2 May 1975) is a Spanish actress born in Barcelona.

She left law school to make her début as an actress in the TV3 series Nissaga de poder. Her starring role in Compañeros, a TV series of Antena 3, and in 7 Vidas of Telecinco made her one of the most popular young Spanish actresses.

== Filmography ==
=== Movies ===
==== Films ====
Year	Movie	Director
2010	Herois	
2005	Ruido	Marcelo Bertalmío
2005	A Mario	Papick Lozano
2003	Días de fútbol	David Serrano
2001	No te fallaré	Manuel Ríos San Martín
2000	Nosotras	Judith Colell
1998	Bomba de relojería	Ramón Grau
1998	El pianista	Mario Gas
1996	Susanna	Antonio Chavarrías

==== Short films ====
Year	Película	Director
2005	El último viaje	F. Aymerich
2000	Fuego	Marcos Navarro Narganes
1998	El accidente	Jordi Bueno

=== Television ===
Year	Series	Director
2021	Todos mienten	Yolanda
2017	Sé quién eres	Marta Hess
2016	Cites	Gilda
2004	Maigret: L'ombra cinese	Renato De Maria
2004	Maigret: La trappola	Renato De Maria
1996	Nissaga de Poder	Josep Maria Benet i Jornet and Xavier Berraondo
1994	Estació d'enllaç	Xavier Berraondo and Eduard Cortés
1998	Menudo es mi padre	
1998	Compañeros	Pablo Barrera and Guillermo Fernández Groizard
1998	7 Vidas	Ricardo A. Solla and Mario Montero
