= Lope (film) =

2010 film directed by Andrucha Waddington

Lope: The Outlaw
- Spanish theatrical release poster
- Spanish: Lope
- Directed by: Andrucha Waddington
- Written by: Jordi Gasull; Ignacio del Moral
- Produced by: Mercedes Gamero; Jordi Gasull; Tadeo Villalba; Andrucha Waddington
- Starring: Alberto Ammann; Leonor Watling; Pilar López de Ayala; Luis Tosar; Selton Mello; Antonio de la Torre; Miguel Ángel Muñoz; Ramón Pujol; Carla Nieto; Sonia Braga; Antonio Dechent; Juan Diego
- Cinematography: Ricardo Della Rosa
- Edited by: Sergio Mekler
- Music by: Fernando Velázquez
- Production companies: Antena 3 Films; Conspiração Filmes; Ikiru Films; El Toro Pictures
- Distributed by: Hispano Fox Film (Spain, via 20th Century Fox); Warner Bros. Pictures (Brazil)
- Release date: 3 September 2010 (Spain)
- Running time: 106 minutes
- Countries: Spain; Brazil
- Language: Spanish

Lope: The Outlaw (Spanish: Lope) is a 2010 Spanish-Brazilian adventure drama film directed by Andrucha Waddington which stars Alberto Ammann, Leonor Watling and Pilar López de Ayala. The film is a co-production between Spain and Brazil, inspired in the youth of Lope de Vega.

== Plot ==
This is a biopic of the poet and playwright Lope de Vega. Set in 1588, Lope is a young soldier who has just arrived in Madrid from the war. The city is still under construction and he, like many others, still does not know which path to follow. While struggling with his restlessness and ambition, two women come into his life. One, a liberal and successful businesswoman who can help Lope with his career, and the other, an aristocrat who ends up being his true lover.

== Cast ==
- Alberto Ammann as Lope.
- Leonor Watling as Isabel.
- Pilar López de Ayala as Elena.
- Antonio de la Torre as Juan.
- Juan Diego as Jerónimo Velázquez.
- Luis Tosar as Fray Bernardo.
- Ramón Pujol as Claudio.
- Selton Mello as Marqués de Navas.
- Sonia Braga as Paquita.
- Jordi Dauder as Porres.
- Miguel Ángel Muñoz as Perrenot.
- Antonio Dechent as Salcedo.
- Carla Nieto as María.
- Héctor Colomer as Urbino.
- Joaquín Notario as criado Velázquez.

== Production ==
The screenplay was penned by Ignacio del Moral and Jordi Gasull. The film was produced by Antena 3 Films, El Toro Pictures, Ikiru Films and Conspiraçao Filmes. Ricardo Della Rosa was responsible for cinematography and Sergio Mekler for film editing. Shooting locations included the Madrid region, Toledo and the Atlantic coast of Morocco (Essaouira and Safi).

== Release ==
Distributed by Twentieth Century Fox, the film premiered on 3 September 2010.

== Awards and nominations ==
Year	Award	Category	Nominee(s)	Result	Ref.
2011	16th Forqué Awards	Best Film		Nominated	
2011	25th Goya Awards	Best Original Song	"Que el soneto nos tome por sorpresa" by Jorge Drexler	Won	
2011	25th Goya Awards	Best Supporting Actress	Pilar López de Ayala	Nominated	
2011	25th Goya Awards	Best Production Supervision	Edmon Roch, Toni Novella	Nominated	
2011	25th Goya Awards	Best Art Direction	César Macarrón	Nominated	
2011	25th Goya Awards	Best Costume Design	Tatiana Hernández	Won	
2011	25th Goya Awards	Best Makeup and Hairstyles	Karmele Soler, Martín Macías Trujillo, Paco Rodríguez H.	Nominated	
2011	25th Goya Awards	Best Special Effects	Raúl Romanillos, Marcelo Siqueira	Nominated	
2011	20th Actors and Actresses Union Awards	Best Film Actress in a Minor Role	Pilar López de Ayala	Won	
2011	20th Actors and Actresses Union Awards	Best Film Actor in a Minor Role	Antonio de la Torre	Won	
2011	20th Actors and Actresses Union Awards	Best Film Actor in a Minor Role	Juan Diego	Nominated	

== See also ==
- List of Spanish films of 2010
- List of Brazilian films of 2010
