= Antonio Riestra =

Antonio Riestra, ASC, AČK. (born 1969), is a Mexican-born cinematographer, working in both North America and Europe. He won a Goya Award, and a Gaudí Award for Best Cinematography for his work on Augustí Villaronga's Black Bread (Spain's official entry for the 84th Academy Awards).

== Early life ==
Riestra was born in Mexico in 1969. He worked as a still photographer for the National Indigenous Institute in Mexico, and later with the Cree and Carrier Nations in British Columbia before moving back to Mexico City and beginning a career in film.

== Career ==
Riestra began his career in film working as an assistant cameraman with Pierre Beccu French Director/DP on a documentary about Guatemalan refugees going back home after living in Mexico. After this job, he was hired to do the making of documentary of the Swedish film "Pumas daughter" shot in southern Mexico. Riestra climbed the ladder in the film industry on several projects as a focus puller like Rough Magic Directed by Claire Peploe, starring Russell Crow and Bridget Fonda and then on Amores Perros as a camera operator and with Emmanuel Lubezki in commercials. Riestra's first opportunity to be a cinematographer came on an American commercial shooting in Mexico which later opened the doors to working with the best Mexican commercial directors, and also to shooting 2nd Unit on Frida (2002) alongside Rodrigo Prieto, AMC, ASC. From there Riestra worked as director of photography on several films including: Normal the Düsseldorf Ripper (2009), which earned him a nomination for Best Cinematography at the Czech Lion Awards, Black Bread (2010) for which he won best cinematography at both the Goya Awards and Gaudi Awards, Lidice (2011), which earned him another nomination for best cinematography at the Czech Lion Awards, Katmandú: A Mirror in the Sky (2011), earning him a nomination for best cinematography at the Gaudi Awards, and Mama (2013), for which he was nominated for Best Cinematography at the Canadian Screen Awards.

Riestra recently worked on the upcoming film Eloise directed by Rob Legato, Stephanie directed Akiva Goldsman. He is a member of the American Society of Cinematographers (ASC), the Czech Assoc. of Cinematographers (AČK), the European Film Academy, the Catalan Film Academy, and IATSE 600.

== Filmography (partial) ==
Year	Film	Director	Other notes
2000	Los Baños de Celeste	Yury Tacher	
2004	Mr. Blue	Lars C. Steinmeyer	
2009	Normal the Düsseldorf Ripper	Julius Sevcik	Nominee, Best Cinematography- Czech Lion Awards, 2009
2010	Black Bread (Pa Negre)	Agusti Villaronga	Winner, Best Cinematography- Goya Awards, 2011 Winner, Best Cinematography- Gaudi Awards, 2011
2011	Czech-Made Man	Tomás Rehorek	
2011	Lidice	Petr Nikolaev	Best Cinematography- Czech Lion Awards, 2012
2011	Katmandú: A Mirror in the Sky	Iciar Bollain	Nominee, Best Cinematography- Gaudi Awards, 2012
2013	Mama	Andres Muschietti	Nominee, Best Cinematography - 2nd Canadian Screen Awards, 2014
2013	The Face of Love	Arie Posin	
2015	Last Knights	Kazuaki Kiriya	
2015	Eloise	Robert Legato	
2016	Stephanie	Akiva Goldsman	
