= 18 Meals =

- Film poster
- Spanish: 18 comidas
- Directed by: Jorge Coira
- Starring: Luis Tosar; Federico Pérez Rey
- Release dates: 12 June 2010 (TFF); 19 November 2010
- Running time: 101 minutes
- Country: Spain
- Languages: Spanish; Galician; English; Macedonian

18 Meals (Spanish: 18 comidas) is a 2010 Spanish comedy film directed by Jorge Coira and starring Luis Tosar and Federico Pérez Rey.

== Cast ==
- Luis Tosar as Edu
- Federico Pérez Rey as Tuto
- Víctor Fábregas as Fran
- Esperanza Pedreño as Sol
- Gael Nodar Fernández as Gael
- Pedro Alonso as Vladimir Torres
- Mario Zorrilla as Teo
