= Paper Birds =

- Film poster
- Spanish: Pájaros de papel
- Directed by: Emilio Aragón Álvarez
- Written by: Emilio Aragón Álvarez; Fernando Castets
- Starring: Imanol Arias; Lluís Homar; Fernando Cayo; Carmen Machi; Roger Príncep; Javier Coll; Diego Martín; Oriol Vila; Cristina Marcos; José Ángel Egido; Emilio Aragón; Luis Varela; Asunción Balaguer; Pedro Civera; Francisco Merino; Lola Baldrich
- Edited by: José Salcedo
- Music by: Emilio Aragón Álvarez
- Distributed by: Hispano Fox Film (via 20th Century Fox)
- Release date: 12 March 2010
- Running time: 110 minutes
- Country: Spain
- Language: Spanish
- Budget: 3.5 million €

Paper Birds (Spanish: Pájaros de papel) is a 2010 Spanish drama film directed by Emilio Aragón Álvarez, starring Imanol Arias. The film tells the story of a group of vaudeville artists in the hard times after the Spanish Civil War. This film, translated into Russian by Andrey Efremov, was shown in Moscow in June 2011 as part of the Moscow International Film Festival.

== Plot ==
Jorge and Enrique are two performers in post-Civil War Spain who adopt an orphan child called Miguel. With a variety company that travels around the country, Jorge and Enrique see the horrors left by the war, while Nationalists watch Jorge and the rest of the company, suspecting that some of them collaborate with the Republicans opposing Franco's regime.

== Cast ==
- Imanol Arias as Jorge del Pino.
- Lluís Homar as Enrique Corgo.
- Roger Príncep as Miguel Puertas Maldonado.
- Carmen Machi as Rocío Moliner.
- Fernando Cayo as Capitán Montero.
- Diego Martin as Teniente Quiroga.
- José Ángel Egido as Ricardo Ubieto.

== See also ==
- List of Spanish films of 2010
