= Juana Macías =

Spanish film director and screenwriter

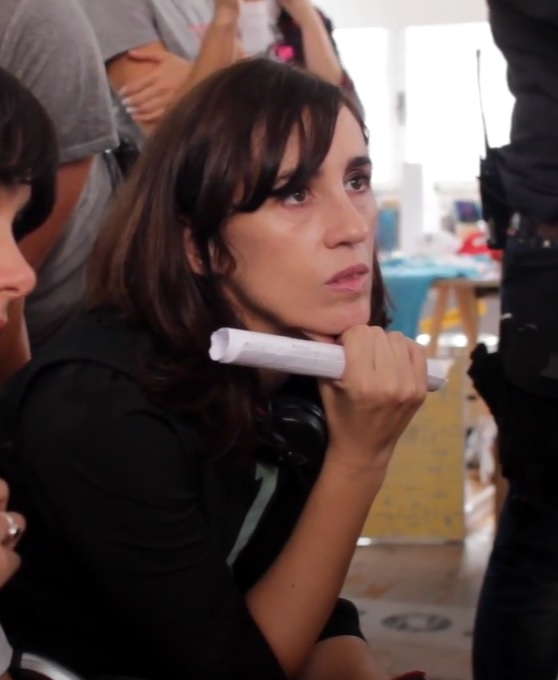
- Macías in 2014
- Born: Juana Macías Alba; 1971 (age 53–54); Madrid, Spain
- Occupations: Film director; screenwriter

Juana Macías Alba (born 1971) is a Spanish filmmaker.

== Life and career ==
Juana Macías Alba was born in Madrid in 1971. She earned a licentiate degree in audiovisual communication from the Complutense University of Madrid (UCM). Her short film Siete cafés for semana won the Goya Award for Best Fictional Short Film. After making seven short films, she shot her full-length directorial debut Plans for Tomorrow. It earned her Best Direction and Best New Screenplay awards at the 2010 Málaga Film Festival as well as a nomination to the Goya Award for Best New Director.

Her sophomore feature, the comedy Embarazados was released in 2016. It was followed by comedy Under the Same Roof (2019), romantic comedy Sounds Like Love (2021), screwball family comedy El favor (2023), and drama The Girls at the Station (2024).

She is a member of the Academy of Cinematographic Arts and Sciences of Spain and the European Film Academy.
