= Julia's Eyes =

- Theatrical release poster
- Spanish: Los ojos de Julia
- Directed by: Guillem Morales
- Written by: Guillem Morales; Oriol Paulo
- Produced by: Joaquín Padró; Mar Targarona; Guillermo del Toro; Mercedes Gamero
- Starring: Belén Rueda; Lluís Homar; Pablo Derqui; Francesc Orella; Joan Dalmau; Julia Gutiérrez Caba
- Cinematography: Óscar Faura
- Edited by: Joan Manel Vilaseca
- Music by: Fernando Velázquez
- Production companies: Rodar y Rodar; Antena 3 Films
- Distributed by: Universal Pictures International
- Release dates: 11 September 2010 (TIFF); 29 October 2010 (Spain)
- Running time: 117 minutes
- Countries: Spain; Mexico
- Language: Spanish
- Box office: $16.9 million

Julia's Eyes (Spanish: Los ojos de Julia) is a 2010 horror and psychological thriller film directed by Guillem Morales and written by Morales and Oriol Paulo. It was produced by Guillermo del Toro, Joaquín Padró and Mar Targarona. The film is an international co-production between Spain and Mexico.

== Plot ==
Tormented by an unseen presence, a blind woman, Sara, prepares to hang herself in her basement, but changes her mind. As she tries to remove the noose, the stool beneath her is kicked away, leaving her to die. Miles away, Sara's twin sister, Julia, collapses, sensing something amiss.

Julia, who has the same degenerative disease but can still see, is tormented by Sara's death and by the feeling of another presence nearby. She insists Sara was not depressed as she was awaiting surgery to restore her vision. Her husband, Isaac, insists she stop investigating, as her doctor has informed him that Sara had eye surgery that was not successful.

Julia meets Sara's elderly blind neighbor Soledad, who has a pessimistic view that Isaac will leave her, as even Soledad's own son, Ángel, abandoned her after she went blind. After hearing that Sara had a boyfriend and they visited a hotel nearby, Julia goes there with Isaac. She is approached by an elderly janitor, Créspulo, who warns her of "men who live in shadows," who are dangerous because they are tired of being ignored.

Isaac disappears and Julia is convinced that the "invisible man" has kidnapped him, though the police are skeptical. Someone kills Créspulo, but police rule it an accident. Julia's eyesight continues to deteriorate. When Julia and the inspector return to Sara's house, the inspector discovers a suicide note and Isaac's body. Julia, now fully blind, cannot see anything.

A grieving Julia learns Isaac's suicide note declared he loved Sara, with whom he had been having an affair for six months. However, an eye donor is found, so the operation to save Julia's sight goes ahead. She is told she must wear bandages to protect her eyes from light for two weeks, and the morgue agrees to keep Isaac's body so she can see him to say goodbye. She returns to Sara's house with the daily help of a home nursing aid, Iván.

Julia is plagued by disorientation and convinced that somebody is lurking in the house; but Iván's patience helps her regain her independence. Four days before Julia is due to remove her bandages, an unseen man almost succeeds in drugging her while she sleeps; however, she wakes, panicked, and accidentally hits the intruder. She flees to a neighbor, Blasco, who makes advances on her. She escapes, calling Iván, who finds her hiding outside in the rain and escorts her to his apartment.

While Iván is out, Julia hears the voice of Blasco's shy daughter, Lía, who tells her that Iván is the "invisible man" who tormented and blinded Sara by ruining her operation, forced Isaac to write the fake suicide note before killing him, and has walls covered with photographs of Julia and Sara. Julia hides in the bathroom where, four days early, she tears off her bandages, desperate to see. Julia exits the bathroom and sees Iván's walls covered with photographs of the twins as well as Lía's bloodied body.

Iván returns to the apartment, where Julia pretends that she is crying because her operation has failed. He believes her momentarily before leading her to the body of the real Iván; Julia's scream betrays the fact that she can see. "Iván" tells her he loves her and wants them to be together as long as her sight is gone, since blind women are the only ones who need him.

"Iván" drives Julia back to Sara's, where she flees to Soledad's. "Iván" chases her and addresses Soledad as Mom, revealing himself as her missing son, Ángel. A candle and glasses betray the fact that Soledad is not really blind as she knocks Julia out, at which point an enraged Ángel attacks his mother and blinds her. Julia escapes and manages to contact the police. She uses a flashlight to show the police a bloodied Ángel hiding in a corner of the room. Finally visible, he slits his own throat.

At the hospital, Julia is told the damage to her new eyes is irreversible. Using her last few hours of vision, she finally says goodbye to Isaac's corpse, as it is revealed that he donated his eyes to her.

== Cast ==
- Belén Rueda as Julia Levin/Sara
- Lluís Homar as Isaac
- Francesc Orella as Inspector Dimas
- Pablo Derqui as Ángel
- Julia Gutiérrez Caba as Soledad
- Daniel Grao as Dr. Román
- Boris Ruiz as Mr. Blasco
- Joan Dalmau as Créspulo
- Andrea Hermosa as Lía Blasco
- Carlus Fàbrega as Subinspector
- Dani Codina as Iván
- Clara Segura as Mina
- Laura Barba as Dela

== Production ==
Guillermo del Toro worked a second time as producer for a Spanish genre production and co-produced the film with Joaquín Padró and Mar Targarona for Rodar y Rodar Cine y Televisión. The film starred Belén Rueda and Lluís Homar. Guillem Morales wrote the screenplay co-authored with Oriol Paulo. The film was co-financed by Focus Features International.

== Soundtrack ==
The score was created by Barcelona-based film composer Fernando Velázquez.

== Release ==
The film had its world premiere at the 35th Toronto International Film Festival on 11 September 2010. It opened the 43rd Sitges Film Festival on 7 October 2010. It was released theatrically in Spain on 29 October 2010 by Universal Pictures. It was released in the United Kingdom as Julia's Eyes by Optimum Releasing. In Australia it was released as Julia's Eyes by Umbrella Entertainment on 2 June 2011.

== Reception ==
Julia's Eyes received mostly positive reviews. On the review aggregator website Rotten Tomatoes, 90% of 39 critics' reviews are positive, with an average rating of 6.54/10. The website's consensus reads: "Smart, suspenseful, and visually distinctive, Julia's Eyes marks another modern Spanish thriller that quickens the pulse while engaging the mind."

Philip French of The Guardian wrote, "Using blindness as a plot device, a metaphor for social awareness and as a numinous experience that romantically links minds, it's a fascinating, broken-backed picture full of riveting twists and dubious psychology." Charlotte O'Sullivan of the London Evening Standard praised the film and Rueda in particular, writing, "Rueda is a fantastic actress, tightly wound, but never brittle. From the minute she's on screen we identify with Julia's plight."

Philippa Hawker of The Age wrote, "Julia's Eyes becomes a little incoherent as it plunges towards resolution, but it's unerringly stylish and whole-heartedly suspenseful along the way. Morales toys with red herrings, references Hitchcock, amps up the tension, spills blood; he also plays with the camera's ability to reveal and conceal simultaneously. In the end, although the film takes on the traits of a classic 'don't go back inside the house' slasher movie, it's the quiet, slowly-building confrontations, one on one, that linger in the memory."

== Remake ==
The film was remade in India four times (in Hindi as Blurr (2022), in Marathi as Adrushya (2021), in Tamil as Unpaarvaiyil (2025), and in Telugu as Divya Drushti (2025)) and in South Korea as The Eyes (2026).

== See also ==
- List of Spanish films of 2010
