= Alta Films =

Spanish film company

- Type: Sociedad anónima
- Industry: Entertainment
- Founded: 1969
- Founders: Juan Miguel López Iglesias; Yelena Samarina
- Defunct: 2013
- Headquarters: Madrid, Spain
- Products: Motion pictures
- Services: Film distribution; production
- Divisions: Alta Classics; Alta Producción; Cines Renoir

Alta Films S.A. was a Spanish film distribution company based in Madrid. It also operated in film exhibition through the Cines Renoir chain and later expanded into film production. Established in 1969, the company initially specialised in bringing Soviet cinema to Spanish audiences before becoming one of Spain's leading independent film distributors. Its distribution business ceased operations in 2013.

== History ==
=== Founding and Soviet film distribution ===
Alta Films was founded in 1969 by the painter Juan Miguel López Iglesias and his wife, the Russian-born actress Yelena Samarina. López Iglesias, the son of Spanish Republican exiles who had lived in the Soviet Union, had established contacts with Sovexportfilm, the Soviet agency responsible for the international distribution of films. The company's name was formed from the first two syllables of the names of the couple's children, Alejandro and Tatiana.

Although founded in 1969, Alta Films began regular distribution activity in 1973. Its early catalogue consisted predominantly of Soviet films, initially shown through film clubs and cultural associations. It included works by Sergei Eisenstein, Vsevolod Pudovkin, Alexander Dovzhenko, Mikhail Kalatozov and Andrei Tarkovsky, many of whose films had previously received little or no commercial distribution in Spain.

Following López Iglesias's death, Enrique González Macho purchased Alta Films from Samarina in 1984 for three million pesetas. He retained the company's name and expanded its commercial operations. During the 1980s, Alta continued to distribute both classical and contemporary Soviet cinema, including Battleship Potemkin, Andrei Rublev, Solaris, Stalker, The Ascent and Repentance. It subsequently broadened its catalogue to include independent films from Spain, Western Europe, Latin America, Africa and elsewhere.

Alta also helped export Spanish films to the Soviet Union. In 1989 it joined Sovexportfilm and a private investor in establishing the Spanish–Soviet company Alsov. Between 1990 and 1993, the company jointly managed Moscow's historic Khudozhestvenny Cinema, where it presented Spanish films to Soviet and Russian audiences.

=== Exhibition and production ===
González Macho expanded into exhibition with the opening of the Renoir Princesa cinemas in Madrid in May 1986. These became the basis of the Cines Renoir chain, which specialised in Spanish and international films, frequently shown in their original languages with subtitles. The circuit later operated in several Spanish cities and, at its height, comprised nearly 200 screens.

The company began producing films in the early 1990s and worked on projects associated with filmmakers including Ken Loach, Icíar Bollaín and Tomás Gutiérrez Alea. According to González Macho, Alta Films handled approximately 35 to 40 percent of the Spanish films distributed domestically during part of the late 1990s. Across its history, the company worked with 215 Spanish films, including more than 60 directorial debuts.

=== Closure ===
In April 2013, Paramount Home Media Distribution announced an agreement to distribute titles from Alta Films' catalogue on DVD and Blu-ray. Later that month, however, González Macho announced that Alta Films would cease film distribution. He attributed the decision to falling cinema attendance, the decline of the DVD market, reduced support for independent cinema from Televisión Española, the effects of the Spanish financial crisis and an increase in the value-added tax applied to cultural goods.

The Argentine comedy 2+2, released in Spain on 1 May 2013, was the company's final theatrical release. Alta Films ended its distribution activity later that month, while a smaller number of Renoir cinemas continued operating in Madrid and Barcelona.
