= List of Spanish films of 2009 =

A list of Spanish-produced and co-produced feature films released in Spain in 2009. When applicable, the domestic theatrical release date is favoured.

== Films ==
Release		Title (Domestic title)	Cast & Crew	Distribution label	Ref.
J A N U A R Y	9	Quarantine	Director: John Erick Dowdle Cast: Jennifer Carpenter, Jay Hernandez, Columbus Short, Greg Germann	Filmax	
J A N U A R Y	16	The One-Handed Trick (El truco del manco)	Director: Santiago A. Zannou Cast: Juan Manuel Montilla "El Langui", Ovono Candela, Javier Iglesias, Elio Toffana, Mala Rodríguez	Alta Classics	
J A N U A R Y	23	The Anarchist's Wife (La mujer del anarquista)	Director: Marie Noëlle, Peter Sehr Cast: Juan Diego Botto, María Valverde, Ivana Baquero, Adrià Collado	Alta Classics	
J A N U A R Y	30	The Hanged Man (El juego del ahorcado)	Director: Manuel Gómez Pereira Cast: Clara Lago, Álvaro Cervantes, Adriana Ugarte	Sony Pictures	(Note: Co-production Spain–Ireland (80%–20%).)
F E B R U A R Y	6	Mediterranean Food (Dieta mediterránea)	Director: Joaquín Oristrell Cast: Olivia Molina, Paco León, Alfonso Bassave, Carmen Balagué, Roberto Álvarez	Alta Classics	
F E B R U A R Y	13	The Milk of Sorrow (La teta asustada)	Director: Claudia Llosa Cast: Magaly Solier, Susi Sánchez, Efraín Solís, Mariano Ballón	Wanda Visión	(Note: Co-production Spain–Peru (80%–20%).)
F E B R U A R Y	27	Che (Che. Guerrilla)	Director: Steven Soderbergh Cast: Benicio del Toro, Carlos Bardem, Demián Bichir, Joaquim de Almeida, Eduard Fernández, Óscar Jaenada, Jordi Mollá, Jorge Perugorría, Franka Potente, Rodrigo Santoro	Hispano Foxfilm	(Note: Co-production Spain–United States (25%–75%).)
M A R C H	13	Los muertos van deprisa	Director: Ángel de la Cruz Cast: Neus Asensi, Chete Lera, Manuel Manquiña, María Castro	Buena Vista International	
M A R C H	18	Broken Embraces (Los abrazos rotos)	Director: Pedro Almodóvar Cast: Penélope Cruz, Lluís Homar, Blanca Portillo, José Luis Gómez, Rubén Ochandiano, Tamar Novas	Warner Bros. Pictures	
M A R C H	27	Sex, Party and Lies (Mentiras y gordas)	Director: Alfonso Albacete, David Menkes Cast: Mario Casas, Ana de Armas, Hugo Silva, Yon González, Ana Polvorosa, Maxi Iglesias	Sony Pictures	
M A R C H	27	Return to Hansala (Retorno a Hansala)	Director: Chus Gutiérrez Cast: José Luis García Pérez, Antonio de la Torre, Farah Hamed, Cuca Escribano, Antonio Dechent	Wanda Visión	
A P R I L	3	La casa de mi padre	Director: Gorka Merchán Cast: Carmelo Gómez, Verónica Echegui, Juan José Ballesta, Emma Suárez	Filmax	
A P R I L	8	Road to Santiago (Al final del camino)	Director: Roberto Santiago Cast: Fernando Tejero, Malena Alterio, Javier Gutiérrez, Diego Peretti, Javier Mora, Cristina Alcázar, Jorge Monje, Luis Callejo, Alberto Jo Lee, Ma-Anne Valmeo, Irene Escolar, Ana Milán	Warner Bros. Pictures	
A P R I L	24	Brain Drain (Fuga de cerebros)	Director: Fernando González Molina Cast: Mario Casas, Amaia Salamanca, Alberto Amarilla, Carlos Santos	Hispano Foxfilm	
A P R I L	24	25 Carat (25 kilates)	Director: Patxi Amezcua Cast: Francesc Garrido, Aida Folch, Manuel Morón, Joan Massotkleiner, Hector Colomé	Gólem Distribución	
A P R I L	24	Esperpentos	Director: José Luis García Sánchez Cast: Juan Diego, Juan Luis Galiardo, Julio Diamante, Adriana Ozores, María Pujalte, Jesús Franco	Gona	
A P R I L	30	A Good Man (Un buen hombre)	Director: Juan Martínez Moreno Cast: Tristán Ulloa, Emilio Gutiérrez Caba, Nathalie Poza, Alberto Jiménez	Alta Classics	
A P R I L	30	The Shame (La vergüenza)	Director: David Planell Cast: Alberto San Juan, Natalia Mateo, Norma Martínez, Marta Aledo, Brandon Lastra, Esther Ortega	Avalon	
M A Y	8	Little Ashes (Sin límites)	Director: Paul Morrison Cast: Robert Pattinson, Matthew McNulty, Javier Beltrán	Sorolla Films	
M A Y	15	Insignificant Things (Cosas insignificantes)	Director: Andrea Martínez Crowther Cast: Carmelo Gómez, Lucía Jiménez, Bárbara Mori, Arturo Ríos	Notro Films	
J U N E	12	7 minutos	Director: Daniela Fejerman Cast: Luis Callejo, Marta Etura, Toni Acosta, Antonio Garrido, Pilar Castro, Asier Etxeandia	Alta Classics	
J U N E	12	The Haunting (NO-DO)	Director: Elio Quiroga Cast: Ana Torrent, Fran Boira, Héctor Colomé	Baditri	
J U N E	26	Tetro	Director: Francis Ford Coppola Cast: Vincent Gallo, Maribel Verdú, Alden Ehrenreich, Carmen Maura, Klaus Maria Brandauer	Alta Classics	(Note: Co-production Spain–Italy–Argentina (35%–20%–45%).)
J U N E	26	Three Days With the Family (Tres dies amb la família)	Director: Mar Coll Cast: Nausicaa Bonnín, Eduard Fernández, Philippine Leroy-Beaulieu, Francesc Orella, Ramon Fontserè	Wanda Visión	
J U L Y	3	Friend Zone (Pagafantas)	Director: Borja Cobeaga Cast: Gorka Otxoa, Sabrina Garciarena, Óscar Ladoire, Julián López, Michel Brown, Ernesto Sevilla	Vértice 360	
J U L Y	10	V.O.S	Director: Cesc Gay Cast: Àgata Roca, Paul Berrondo, Andrés Herrera, Vicenta Ndongo	Alta Classics	
J U L Y	10	Paintball	Director: Daniel Benmayor Cast: Brendan Mackey, Neil Maskell, Claudia Bassols, Anna Casas, Peter Vives Newey, Iaione Perez, Patrick Regis, Jennifer Matter	Filmax	
J U L Y	17	Parlami d'amore (Háblame de amor)	Director: Silvio Muccino Cast: Aitana Sánchez-Gijón, Silvio Muccino, Andrea Renzi, Geraldine Chaplin, Giorgio Colangeli, Carolina Crescentini	On Pictures	
J U L Y	17	199 Tips to Be Happy (199 recetas para ser feliz)	Director: Andrés Waissbluth Cast: Pablo Macaya, Tamara Garea, Andrea García-Huidobro	—N/a	
J U L Y	24	Imago Mortis	Director: Stefano Bessoni Cast: Geraldine Chaplin, Oona Chaplin, Alberto Amarilla, Leticia Dolera, Álex Angulo	Aurum	
J U L Y	24	Paisito	Director: Ana Díez Cast: Pablo Arnoletti, María Botto, Andrea Davidovics, Mauricio Dayub, Ricardo Fernández Blanco, Emilio Gutiérrez Caba	Alta Classics	
J U L Y	31	Acne (Acné)	Director: Federico Veiroj Cast: Verónica Perrotta, Alejandro Tocar, Yoel Bercovici, Igal Label, Gustavo Melnik, Julia Català	Avalon	
A U G U S T	7	My Life in Ruins (Mi vida en ruinas)	Director: Donald Petrie Cast: Nia Vardalos, Richard Dreyfuss, Caroline Goodall, María Adánez, María Botto, Brian Palermo, Alistair McGowan, Rachel Dratch	Vértice 360	
A U G U S T	28	Map of the Sounds of Tokyo (Mapa de los sonidos de Tokio)	Director: Isabel Coixet Cast: Rinko Kikuchi, Sergi López, Min Tanaka, Ideo Sakari, Takeo Nakahara, Manabu Oshio	Alta Classics	
S E P T E M B E R	4	Guts (Agallas)	Director: Samuel Martín Mateos & Andrés Luque Pérez Cast: Hugo Silva, Carmelo Gómez, Carlos Sante, Celso Bugallo, Mabel Rivera, Xavier Estévez, Rula Blanco, Tomás Lijó, Pepo Suevos, Alfonso Agra, Yoima Valdés	Sony Pictures	
S E P T E M B E R	11	Fat People (Gordos)	Director: Daniel Sánchez Arévalo Cast: Antonio de la Torre, Roberto Enríquez, Verónica Sánchez, Raúl Arévalo, Leticia Herrero, Fernando Albizu, María Morales, Pilar Castro, Adam Jezierski, Marta Martín, Teté Delgado	Alta Classics	
S E P T E M B E R	18	Pájaros muertos	Director: Guillermo Sempere, Jorge Sempere Cast: Eduardo Blanco, Silvia Marsó, Alberto Jiménez, Claudia Fontán	Premium Cine	
S E P T E M B E R	18	Flores negras	Director: David Carreras Cast: Tobias Moretti, Maximilian Schell, Eduard Fernández, Marta Etura, Maria Grazia Cucinotta	Filmax	
S E P T E M B E R	25	The Secret in Their Eyes (El secreto de sus ojos)	Director: Juan José Campanella Cast: Ricardo Darín, Soledad Villamil, Pablo Rago, Javier Godino	Alta Classics	(Note: Co-production Spain–Argentina (54%–46%).)
O C T O B E R	2	[REC] 2	Director: Paco Plaza, Jaume Balagueró Cast: Manuela Velasco, Juli Fàbregas, Pep Molina, Àlex Batllori	Filmax	
O C T O B E R	2	La felicidad perfecta	Director: Jabi Elortegui Cast: Anne Igartiburu, Alberto Berzal	Barton Films	
O C T O B E R	9	Agora (Ágora)	Director: Alejandro Amenábar Cast: Rachel Weisz, Max Minghella, Oscar Isaac, Ashraf Barhom, Rupert Evans, Homayoun Ershadi, Michael Lonsdale, Sammy Samir	Hispano Foxfilm	
O C T O B E R	16	Me, Too (Yo, también)	Director: Álvaro Pastor, Antonio Naharro Cast: Lola Dueñas, Pablo Pineda	Gólem Distribución	
O C T O B E R	23	After	Director: Alberto Rodríguez Cast: Guillermo Toledo, Tristán Ulloa, Jesús Carroza, Ricardo de Barreiro, Valeria Alonso, Alicia Rubio, Maxi Iglesias, Álvaro Monje, Marta Solaz	Alta Classics	
O C T O B E R	23	Bullying	Director: Josetxo San Mateo Cast: Albert Carbó, Laura Conejero, Carlos Fuentes, Yohana Cobo	Filmax	
O C T O B E R	30	Paper Castles (Castillos de cartón)	Director: Salvador García Ruiz Cast: Adriana Ugarte, Nilo Mur, Biel Durán	Alta Classics	
N O V E M B E R	6	Cell 211 (Celda 211)	Director: Daniel Monzón Cast: Luis Tosar, Alberto Ammann, Antonio Resines, Manuel Morón, Marta Etura, Carlos Bardem	Paramount Pictures	
N O V E M B E R	20	The Damned (Los condenados)	Director: Isaki Lacuesta Cast: Daniel Fanego, Arturo Goetz, Leonor Manso, María Fiorentino, Bárbara Lennie	Barton Films	
N O V E M B E R	27	Planet 51	Director: Jorge Blanco, Javier Abad, Marcos Martínez	DeAPlaneta	
N O V E M B E R	27	The Dancer and the Thief (El baile de la victoria)	Director: Fernando Trueba Cast: Ricardo Darín, Abel Ayala, Miranda Bodenhöfer, Ariadna Gil	Vértice 360	
N O V E M B E R	27	Looking for Eric (Buscando a Eric)	Director: Ken Loach Cast: Gerard Kearns, Stephanie Bishop, Eric Cantona, Steve Evets	Alta Classics	
D E C E M B E R	4	Spanish Movie	Director: Javier Ruiz Caldera Cast: Alexandra Jiménez, Carlos Areces, Silvia Abril, Joaquín Reyes	Hispano Foxfilm	
D E C E M B E R	4	Las 2 vidas de Andrés Rabadán	Director: Ventura Durall Cast: Alex Brendemühl, Clara Segura, Mar Ulldemolins	—N/a	
D E C E M B E R	11	Bad Day to Go Fishing (Mal día para pescar)	Director: Álvaro Brechner Cast: Gary Piquer, Jouko Ahola, Antonella Costa, César Troncoso	Vértice 360	

== Box office ==
The ten highest-grossing Spanish films in 2009, by domestic box office gross revenue, are as follows:

Highest-grossing films of 2009
Rank	Title	Distributor	Admissions	Domestic gross (€)
1	Agora (Ágora)	Hispano Foxfilm	3,318,399	20,405,735.32
2	Planet 51	DeAPlaneta	1,643,634	9,929,692.82
3	Cell 211 (Celda 211)	Paramount Pictures	1,400,422	8,723,484.75
4	Brain Drain (Fuga de cerebros)	Hispano Foxfilm	1,176,069	6,863,216.54
5	Spanish Movie	Hispano Foxfilm	1,072,280	6,635,295.96
6	The Secret in Their Eyes (El secreto de sus ojos)	Alta Classics	851,133	5,250,183.21
7	Rec 2 ([•REC]²)	Filmax	835.747	5,109,880.56
8	Sex, Party and Lies (Mentiras y gordas)	Sony Pictures	719,428	4,282,941.41
9	Broken Embraces (Los abrazos rotos)	Warner Bros. Pictures	686,581	4,115,027.34
10	Road to Santiago (Al final del camino)	Warner Bros. Pictures	449,844	2,655,379.75

== See also ==
- 24th Goya Awards
- List of 2009 box office number-one films in Spain
