= 19th Actors and Actresses Union Awards =

2010 Spanish award ceremony

- Date: 29 March 2010
- Site: Teatro Circo Price, Madrid, Spain
- Organized by: Actors and Actresses Union

Highlights
- Honorary career award: Aurora Bautista

The 19th Actors and Actresses Union Awards ceremony was held on 29 March 2010 at the Teatro Circo Price in Madrid.

In addition to the competitive awards Sahrawi activist Amainetu Haidar received the 'Mujeres en Unión' award, Aurora Bautista the 'Toda una vida' career award and the Special Award went to the Instituto Cervantes.

== Winners and nominees ==
The winners and nominees are listed as follows:

=== Film ===
Best Male Performance in a Leading Role: Luis Tosar — Cell 211; Antonio de la Torre — Fat People; Lluís Homar — Broken Embraces	Best Female Performance in a Leading Role: Lola Dueñas — Yo, también; Penélope Cruz — Broken Embraces; Soledad Villamil — The Secret in Their Eyes
Best Male Performance in a Secondary Role: Carlos Bardem — Cell 211; Raúl Arévalo — Fat People; José Luis Gómez — Broken Embraces	Best Female Performance in a Secondary Role: Verónica Sánchez — Fat People; Marta Aledo — The Shame; Blanca Portillo — Broken Embraces
Best Male Performance in a Minor Role: Fernando Albizu — Fat People; Juan Jesús Valverde — El libro de las aguas; Luis Zahera — Cell 211	Best Female Performance in a Minor Role: Pilar Castro — Fat People; Lola Dueñas — Broken Embraces; Marta Etura — Cell 211

=== Television ===
Best Male Performance in a Leading Role: Roberto Enríquez — La señora; Gonzalo de Castro — Doctor Mateo; Antonio Chamizo — Días sin luz	Best Female Performance in a Leading Role: Adriana Ugarte — La señora; María Isasi — Días sin luz; Blanca Portillo — Acusados
Best Male Performance in a Secondary Role: Víctor Clavijo — La señora; Javier Collado Goyanes — Amar en tiempos revueltos; Raúl Peña — La señora	Best Female Performance in a Secondary Role: Carmen Conesa — La señora; Inma Cuesta — Águila Roja; Ana Wagener — La señora
Best Male Performance in a Minor Role: Juan Meseguer — La señora; Alberto Amarilla — Acusados; Alberto Rubio — La señora	Best Female Performance in a Minor Role: Pepa Pedroche — Amar en tiempos revueltos; Carmen Arévalo — 90-60-90, diario secreto de una adolescente; Inma Cuevas — La señora

=== Theatre ===
Best Male Performance in a Leading Role: Nicolás Dueñas — Toc toc; Juan Diego Botto — Hamlet; Israel Frías — Blood Wedding	Best Female Performance in a Leading Role: Rosa María Sardá — The House of Bernarda Alba; Nuria Espert — The House of Bernarda Alba; Consuelo Trujillo — Blood Wedding
Best Male Performance in a Secondary Role: Rafa Castejón — Don Carlos; José Luis Alcobendas — La tortuga de Darwin; Luis Rallo — Blood Wedding	Best Female Performance in a Secondary Role: Nathalie Poza — Titus Andronicus; Ana Goya — La cena de los generales; Ana Labordeta — Noviembre
Best Male Performance in a Minor Role: Carlos Álvarez-Nóvoa — Blood Wedding; José Ramón Iglesias — La estrella de Sevilla; Eduardo Mayo — Hamlet	Best Female Performance in a Minor Role: Lucía Bravo — La cena de los generales; Pilar Gil — Blood Wedding; Ana Malaver — Blood Wedding

=== Newcomers ===
Best New Actor: Alberto Ammann — Cell 211; Javier Godino — The Secret in Their Eyes; Daniel Grao — Acusados	Best New Actress: Leticia Herrero — Fat People; Carolina Lapausa — La señora; Amaia Salamanca — Sin tetas no hay paraíso
