= List of awards and nominations received by Pedro Almodóvar =

Pedro Almodóvar awards and nominations
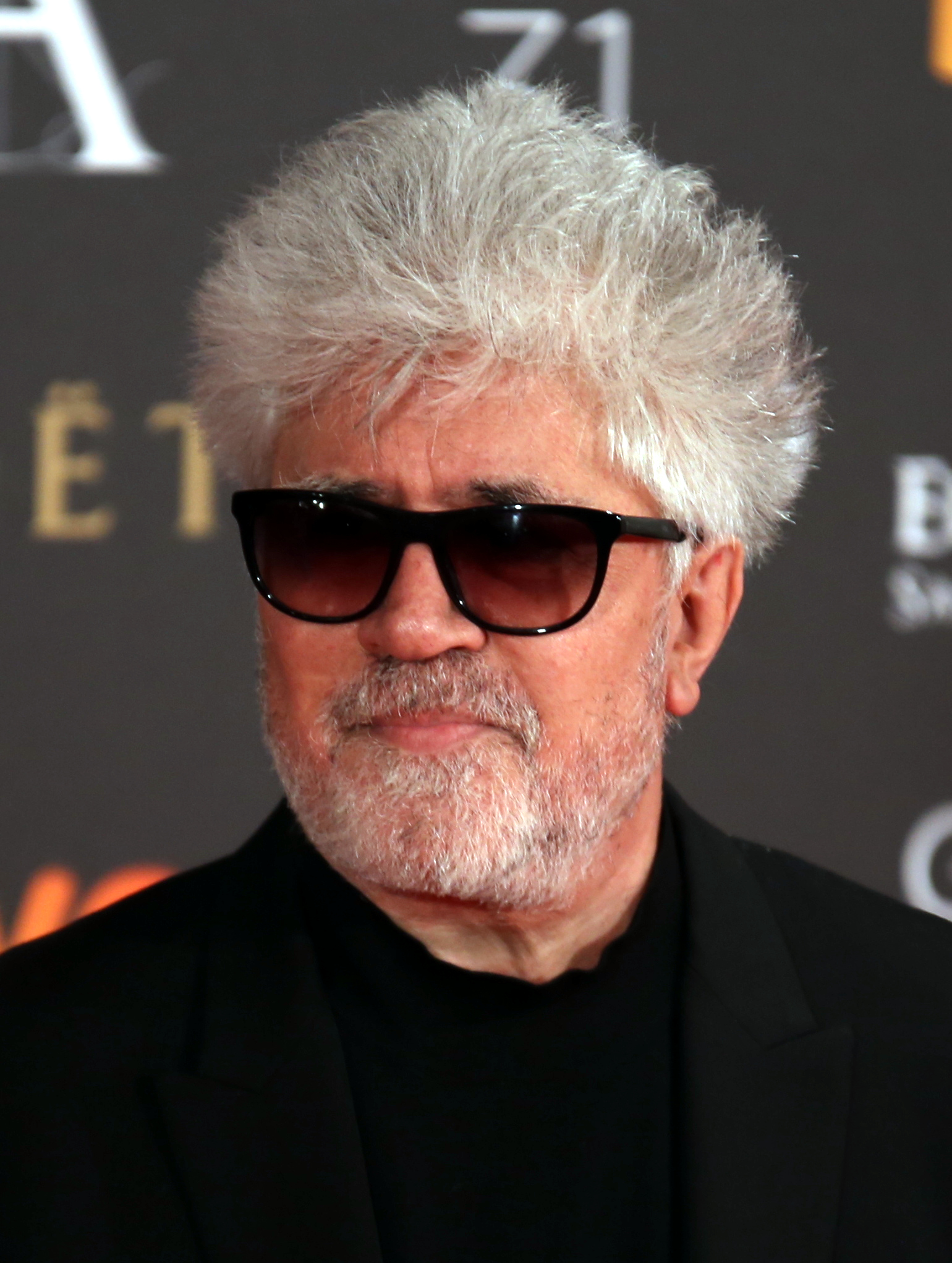
- Almodóvar in 2017.
Award	Wins	Nominations
Totals
Academy Awards	2	3
BAFTA Awards	4	5
Berlin Film Festival	1	2
Cannes Film Festival	2	9
César Awards	3	6
Critics' Choice Movie Awards	2	7
Golden Globe Awards	2	8
Goya Awards	5	21
European Film Awards	6	18
Independent Spirit Awards	0	2
News & Documentary Emmy Awards	2	2
Platino Awards	4	5
Various awards	4	10
Critics associations	28	59
Wins	67
Nominations	158

Pedro Almodóvar is a Spanish filmmaker, director, screenwriter, producer, and former actor. He has received various accolades including an Academy Award, two British Academy Film Awards, three César Awards, two Critics' Choice Awards, two Golden Globe Awards, six Goya Awards, six European Film Awards, and two News and Documentary Emmy Awards. He has also received prizes from the Cannes Film Festival, Berlin International Film Festival and Venice Film Festival. He won the Honorary César in 1999 and the Honorary Golden Lion in 2019.

Acclaimed as one of the most internationally successful Spanish filmmakers, with his filmography gaining worldwide interest and developing a cult following. Known for his distinctive style of black-comedies and melodramas that explore themes like family, passion and desire, he has received several awards and nominations both in Spain and worldwide throughout his career.

He achieved international recognition for his black comedy-drama film Women on the Verge of a Nervous Breakdown (1988), which was nominated for the Academy Award for Best Foreign Language Film as well as the Golden Globe Award for Best Foreign Language Film. His next movies Tie Me Up! Tie Me Down! and The Flower of My Secret would continue his success at his home country, with both being nominated for the Goya Award for Best Director. In 1999 he released All About My Mother followed by Talk to Her in 2002, both received critical acclaim and won Academy Awards, the former won the Academy Award for Best Foreign Language Film, the BAFTA Award for Best Film not in the English Language and the Golden Globe Award for Best Foreign Language Film while the latter won the Academy Award for Best Original Screenplay and he was nominated for Best Director.

Through the 2000s and the 2010s he released several films, Volver in 2006, Broken Embraces in 2009, The Skin I Live In in 2011, Julieta in 2016 and Pain and Glory in 2019, the latter being the third nomination for the Academy Award for Best International Feature Film for one of his films. In 2019 he won the Golden Lion for Lifetime Achievement at Venice Film Festival.

== Major associations ==
=== Academy Awards ===
Year	Category	Nominated work	Result	Ref.
1999	Best Foreign Language Film	All About My Mother	Accepted	
2002	Best Director	Talk to Her	Nominated	
2002	Best Original Screenplay	Talk to Her	Won	

Directed Academy Award performances
Under Almodóvar's direction, these actors have received Academy Award nominations for their performances in their respective roles.

Year	Performer	Film	Result
Academy Award for Best Actor
2019	Antonio Banderas	Pain and Glory	Nominated
Academy Award for Best Actress
2006	Penélope Cruz	Volver	Nominated
2021	Penélope Cruz	Parallel Mothers	Nominated

=== BAFTA Awards ===
Year	Category	Nominated work	Result	Ref.
British Academy Film Awards
1999	Best Film Not in the English Language	All About My Mother	Accepted	
1999	Best Direction	All About My Mother	Won	
1999	Best Original Screenplay	All About My Mother	Nominated	
2002	Best Original Screenplay	Talk to Her	Won	
2002	Best Film Not in the English Language	Talk to Her	Accepted	
2011	Best Film Not in the English Language	The Skin I Live In	Accepted	

=== Critics' Choice Awards ===
Year	Category	Nominated work	Result	Ref.
Critics' Choice Movie Awards
1999	Best Foreign Language Film	All About My Mother	Won	
2002	Best Foreign Language Film	Talk to Her	Nominated	
2006	Best Foreign Language Film	Volver	Nominated	
2009	Best Foreign Language Film	Broken Embraces	Won	
2011	Best Foreign Language Film	The Skin I Live In	Nominated	
2016	Best Foreign Language Film	Julieta	Nominated	
2019	Best Foreign Language Film	Pain and Glory	Nominated	

=== Emmy Awards ===
Year	Category	Nominated work	Result	Ref.
News & Documentary Emmy Awards
2021	Outstanding Politics and Government Documentary	The Silence of Others	Won	
2021	Best Documentary	The Silence of Others	Won	

=== Golden Globe Awards ===
Year	Category	Nominated work	Result	Ref.
1988	Best Foreign Language Film	Women on the Verge of a Nervous Breakdown	Nominated	
1991	Best Foreign Language Film	High Heels	Nominated	
1999	Best Foreign Language Film	All About My Mother	Won	
2002	Best Foreign Language Film	Talk to Her	Won	
2006	Best Foreign Language Film	Volver	Nominated	
2009	Best Foreign Language Film	Broken Embraces	Nominated	
2011	Best Foreign Language Film	The Skin I Live In	Nominated	
2019	Best Foreign Language Film	Pain and Glory	Nominated	
2021	Best Foreign Language Film	Parallel Mothers	Nominated	

=== Goya Awards ===
Year	Category	Nominated wok	Result	Ref
1988	Best Director	Women on the Verge of a Nervous Breakdown	Nominated	
1988	Best Original Screenplay	Women on the Verge of a Nervous Breakdown	Won	
1990	Best Director	Tie Me Up! Tie Me Down!	Nominated	
1990	Best Original Screenplay	Tie Me Up! Tie Me Down!	Nominated	
1995	Best Director	The Flower of My Secret	Nominated	
1999	Best Director	All About My Mother	Won	
1999	Best Original Screenplay	All About My Mother	Nominated	
2002	Best Director	Talk to Her	Nominated	
2002	Best Original Screenplay	Talk to Her	Nominated	
2004	Best Director	Bad Education	Nominated	
2006	Best Director	Volver	Won	
2006	Best Original Screenplay	Volver	Nominated	
2009	Best Original Screenplay	Broken Embraces	Nominated	
2011	Best Director	The Skin I Live In	Nominated	
2011	Best Adapted Screenplay	The Skin I Live In	Nominated	
2015	Best Film	Wild Tales	Nominated	
2016	Best Director	Julieta	Nominated	
2016	Best Adapted Screenplay	Julieta	Nominated	
2019	Best Director	Pain and Glory	Won	
2019	Best Original Screenplay	Pain and Glory	Won	
2021	Best Director	Parallel Mothers	Nominated	
2024	Best Director	The Room Next Door	Nominated	
2024	Best Adapted Screenplay	The Room Next Door	Won	

== Festival awards ==
=== Berlin Film Festival ===
Year	Category	Nominated work	Result	Ref.
1987	Teddy Award	Law of Desire	Won	
1990	Golden Bear	Tie Me Up! Tie Me Down!	Nominated	

=== Cannes Film Festival ===
Year	Category	Nominated work	Result	Ref.
1999	Palme d'Or	All About My Mother	Nominated	
1999	Best Director	All About My Mother	Won	
2006	Best Screenplay	Volver	Won	
2006	Palme d'Or	Volver	Nominated	
2009	Palme d'Or	Broken Embraces	Nominated	
2011	Palme d'Or	The Skin I Live In	Nominated	
2016	Palme d'Or	Julieta	Nominated	
2019	Palme d'Or	Pain and Glory	Nominated	
2019	Queer Palm	Pain and Glory	Nominated	
2026	Palme d'Or	Bitter Christmas	Nominated	
2026	Queer Palm	Bitter Christmas	Nominated	

=== Venice Film Festival ===
Year	Category	Nominated work	Result	Ref.
1988	Golden Lion	Women on the Verge of a Nervous Breakdown	Nominated	
1988	Best Screenplay	Women on the Verge of a Nervous Breakdown	Won	
2019	Golden Lion for Lifetime Achievement		Won	
2021	Golden Lion	Parallel Mothers	Nominated	
2021	Queer Lion	Parallel Mothers	Nominated	
2024	Golden Lion	The Room Next Door	Won	
2024	Brian Award	The Room Next Door	Won	

== Miscellaneous awards ==
Organizations	Year	Category	Work	Result	Ref.
British Independent Film Award	1997	Best International Independent Film Award	Live Flesh	Nominated	
British Independent Film Award	1999	Best International Independent Film Award	All About My Mother	Won	
British Independent Film Award	2002	Best International Independent Film Award	Talk to Her	Nominated	
British Independent Film Award	2006	Best International Independent Film Award	Volver	Nominated	
British Independent Film Award	2011	Best International Independent Film Award	The Skin I Live In	Nominated	
César Awards	1991	Best Foreign Film	Tie Me Up! Tie Me Down!	Nominated	
César Awards	1993	Best Foreign Film	High Heels	Won	
César Awards	1999	Honorary César		Won	
César Awards	2000	Best Foreign Film	All About My Mother	Won	
César Awards	2003	Best Film from the European Union	Talk to Her	Won	
César Awards	2005	Best Film from the European Union	Bad Education	Nominated	
César Awards	2007	Best Foreign Film	Volver	Nominated	
César Awards	2020	Best Foreign Film	Pain and Glory	Nominated	
César Awards	2022	Best Foreign Film	Parallel Mothers	Nominated	
David di Donatello	1988	Best Foreign Director	Women on the Verge of a Nervous Breakdown	Won	
David di Donatello	1988	Best Foreign Film	Women on the Verge of a Nervous Breakdown	Nominated	
David di Donatello	1999	David di Donatello for Best Foreign Film\	All About My Mother	Won	
David di Donatello	2002	David di Donatello for Best Foreign Film	Talk to Her	Nominated	
European Film Awards	1988	Young European Film of the Year	Women on the Verge of a Nervous Breakdown	Won	
European Film Awards	1999	Best Film	All About My Mother	Won	
European Film Awards	2002	Best Film	Talk to Her	Won	
European Film Awards	2002	Best Director	Talk to Her	Won	
European Film Awards	2002	Best Screenwriter	Talk to Her	Won	
European Film Awards	2004	Best Film	Bad Education	Nominated	
European Film Awards	2004	Best Director	Bad Education	Nominated	
European Film Awards	2004	Best Screenwriter	Bad Education	Nominated	
European Film Awards	2006	Best Film	Volver	Nominated	
European Film Awards	2006	Best Director	Volver	Won	
European Film Awards	2009	Best Director	Broken Embraces	Nominated	
European Film Awards	2013	Best Comedy	I'm So Excited	Nominated	
European Film Awards	2016	Best Film	Julieta	Nominated	
European Film Awards	2016	Best Director	Julieta	Nominated	
European Film Awards	2019	Best Film	Pain and Glory	Nominated	
European Film Awards	2019	Best Director	Pain and Glory	Nominated	
European Film Awards	2019	Best Screenwriter	Pain and Glory	Nominated	
European Film Awards	2019	Audience Award (People's Choice)	Pain and Glory	Nominated	
European Film Awards	2024	Best Film	The Room Next Door	Nominated	
European Film Awards	2024	Best Director	The Room Next Door	Nominated	
European Film Awards	2024	Best Screenwriter	The Room Next Door	Nominated	
Guldbagge Award	1999	Best Foreign Film	All About My Mother	Won	
Independent Spirit Awards	1999	Best International Film	All About My Mother	Nominated	
Independent Spirit Awards	2004	Best International Film	Bad Education	Nominated	
Independent Spirit Awards	2021	Best International Film	Parallel Mothers	Nominated	
Platino Awards	2017	Best Ibero-American Film	Julieta	Nominated	
Platino Awards	2017	Best Director	Julieta	Won	
Platino Awards	2020	Best Ibero-American Film	Pain and Glory	Won	
Platino Awards	2020	Best Director	Pain and Glory	Won	
Platino Awards	2020	Best Screenplay	Pain and Glory	Won	
Toronto International Film Festival	2023	Jeff Skoll Award in Impact Media	Himself	Won	

== Critics associations ==
Year	Nominated work	Association	Category	Result
1988	National Board of Review	Best Foreign Language Film	Women on the Verge of a Nervous Breakdown	Won
1988	New York Film Critics Circle Award	Best Foreign Language Film	Women on the Verge of a Nervous Breakdown	Won
1999	Boston Society of Film Critics Award	Best Foreign Film	All About My Mother	Won
1999	Chicago Film Critics Association Award	Best Foreign Language Film	All About My Mother	Won
1999	London Film Critics Circle Award	Foreign Language Film of the Year	All About My Mother	Won
1999	Los Angeles Film Critics Association Award	Best Foreign Language Film	All About My Mother	Won
1999	National Board of Review	Best Foreign Language Film	All About My Mother	Won
1999	New York Film Critics Circle Award	Best Foreign Language Film	All About My Mother	Won
1999	Online Film Critics Society Award	Best Film Not in the English Language	All About My Mother	Nominated
2002	Bangkok International Film Festival	Best Film	Talk to Her	Won
2002	Los Angeles Film Critics Association Award	Best Foreign Language Film	Talk to Her	Nominated
2002	Los Angeles Film Critics Association Award	Best Director	Talk to Her	Won
2002	National Board of Review	Best Foreign Language Film	Talk to Her	Won
2002	San Diego Film Critics Society Award	Best Foreign Language Film	Talk to Her	Won
2002	Vancouver Film Critics Circle Award	Best Non-English Language Feature	Talk to Her	Won
2002	Chicago Film Critics Association Award	Best Foreign Language Film	Talk to Her	Nominated
2002	London Film Critics Circle Award	Director of the Year	Talk to Her	Nominated
2002	London Film Critics Circle Award	Foreign Language Film of the Year	Talk to Her	Nominated
2002	New York Film Critics Circle Award	Best Film	Talk to Her	Nominated
2002	New York Film Critics Circle Award	Best Director	Talk to Her	Nominated
2002	New York Film Critics Circle Award	Best Foreign Language Film	Talk to Her	Nominated
2002	Online Film Critics Society Award	Best Film Not in the English Language	Talk to Her	Nominated
2004	National Board of Review	Best Foreign Language Film	Bad Education	Won
2004	New York Film Critics Circle Award	Best Foreign Language Film	Bad Education	Won
2004	London Film Critics Circle Award	Foreign Language Film of the Year	Bad Education	Nominated
2006	London Film Critics Circle Award	Foreign Language Film of the Year	Volver	Won
2006	National Board of Review	Best Foreign Language Film	Volver	Won
2006	Vancouver Film Critics Circle Award	Best Non-English Language Feature	Volver	Won
2006	Boston Society of Film Critics Award	Best Foreign Film	Volver	Nominated
2006	Chicago Film Critics Association Award	Best Foreign Language Film	Volver	Nominated
2006	Dallas-Fort Worth Film Critics Association Award	Best Foreign Language Film	Volver	Nominated
2006	London Film Critics Circle Award	Film of the Year	Volver	Nominated
2006	London Film Critics Circle Award	Director of the Year	Volver	Nominated
2006	Los Angeles Film Critics Association Award	Best Foreign Language Film	Volver	Nominated
2006	New York Film Critics Circle Award	Best Foreign Language Film	Volver	Nominated
2006	Online Film Critics Society Award	Best Film Not in the English Language	Volver	Nominated
2006	Toronto Film Critics Association Award	Best Foreign Language Film	Volver	Nominated
2009	Phoenix Film Critics Society Award	Best Foreign Language Film	Broken Embraces	Won
2009	Chicago Film Critics Association Award	Best Foreign Language Film	Broken Embraces	Nominated
2009	Dallas-Fort Worth Film Critics Association Award	Best Foreign Language Film	Broken Embraces	Nominated
2009	New York Film Critics Circle Award	Best Foreign Language Film	Broken Embraces	Nominated
2009	Online Film Critics Society Award	Best Film Not in the English Language	Broken Embraces	Nominated
2009	Vancouver Film Critics Circle Award	Best Non-English Language Feature	Broken Embraces	Nominated
2009	Washington D.C. Area Film Critics Association Award	Best Foreign Language Film	Broken Embraces	Nominated
2011	Florida Film Critics Circle Award	Best Foreign Language Film	The Skin I Live In	Won
2011	Phoenix Film Critics Society Award	Best Foreign Language Film	The Skin I Live In	Won
2011	Washington D.C. Area Film Critics Association Award	Best Foreign Language Film	The Skin I Live In	Won
2011	Chicago Film Critics Association Award	Best Foreign Language Film	The Skin I Live In	Nominated
2011	Dallas-Fort Worth Film Critics Association Award	Best Foreign Language Film	The Skin I Live In	Nominated
2011	London Film Critics Circle Award	Foreign Language Film of the Year	The Skin I Live In	Nominated
2011	New York Film Critics Circle Award	Best Foreign Language Film	The Skin I Live In	Nominated
2011	Online Film Critics Society Award	Best Film Not in the English Language	The Skin I Live In	Nominated
2016	National Board of Review	Best Foreign Language Film	Julieta	Won
2016	San Diego Film Festival Award	Best International Film	Julieta	Won
2016	Chicago Film Critics Association Award	Best Foreign Language Film	Julieta	Nominated
2016	Washington D.C. Area Film Critics Association Award	Best Foreign Language Film	Julieta	Nominated
2019	Los Angeles Film Critics Association Award	Best Foreign Language Film	Pain and Glory	Won
2019	National Board of Review	Top 5 Foreign Films	Pain and Glory	Won
