= Broken Embraces (soundtrack) =

Film score by Alberto Iglesias
- Released: 11 August 2009
- Genre: Film score
- Length: 57:17
- Labels: EMI; Parlophone
- Producers: Alberto Iglesias; Javier Casado

Alberto Iglesias chronology
Che (2009)	Broken Embraces (2010)	Even the Rain (2011)

Broken Embraces (Spanish: Los abrazos rotos) is the soundtrack album to the 2009 Spanish romantic drama film of the same name directed by Pedro Almodóvar starring Penélope Cruz and Lluís Homar. The album consisted of the film score composed by Alberto Iglesias, and was released through EMI and Parlophone on 11 August 2009.

== Background ==
Broken Embraces is the sixth collaboration between Almodóvar and Iglesias. The score utilizes Spanish jazz elements with the use of electric guitar in the noir sequences and flamenco piano, highlighting the jazz structure. Spanish flamenco singer Miguel Poveda had performed vocals for few songs of the film. He accepted the offer, as he was in contact with the composer; Poveda recalled that Almodóvar had decided the music to be intense and elegant, which Iglesias followed. The singer also worked with the composer at his studio and the song "A Ciegas" was featured in the film.

== Reception ==
Kirk Honeycutt of The Hollywood Reporter wrote the "score by longtime collaborator Alberto Iglesias evokes the many movies the director embraces in Broken Embraces." Omar Moore of RogerEbert.com wrote "beautiful music score". Jonathan Holland of Variety wrote "Iglesias superbly evokes the moods and movies Embraces is so in thrall to." Adrian Edwards of Gramophone wrote, "Broken Embraces – or, to give the film its Spanish title, Los abrazos rotos – is a compelling soundtrack to relish."

Eric Calderwood of Paste called it a "haunting" score. Robert Barry of The Quietus wrote "Alberto Iglesias's music recalls neo-noirs like The Last Seduction". Jake Coyle of Today called it a "sensuous score". Amy Biancolli of SFGate wrote "Alberto Iglesias' score mutters and swells, portending sexy doom in minor keys [adding] up to an entertaining combination of suspense and melodrama." Critic based at Santa Barbara Independent wrote "a musical score of uncommon, cliché-free grace is supplied by the director's right-hand composer, Alberto Iglesias." Stephanie Zacharek of Salon.com wrote Iglesias's score "carries conscious echoes of the vortex of strings Bernard Herrmann created for Vertigo."

== Track listing ==
No.	Title	Length
1.	"Títulos De Crédito"	1:31
2.	"Tema de Amor Ciego" (1)	1:15
3.	"La Visita de Ray X"	1:13
4.	"El Cajón Abierto"	1:34
5.	"El Espía Atrapado"	1:44
6.	"Llamadas Telefónicas"	1:39
7.	"Caida, Recogida y Rayos X"	3:54
8.	"Habitación Con Amante"	1:33
9.	"Final y "a Ciegas" por Miguel Poveda"	7:37
10.	"El Sabor de Tu Boca"	1:10
11.	"Werewolf" (Cat Power)	4:08
12.	"Tema de Amor Ciego" (2)	1:07
13.	"Famara"	2:35
14.	"Peeping Tom"	3:02
15.	"Pasillo del Tiempo"	1:53
16.	"Encuentro"	1:27
17.	"La Noche"	0:54
18.	"Retake"	1:23
19.	"Dona Sangre"	2:41
20.	"Chicas y Maletas"	0:51
21.	"El Documental"	1:52
22.	"Hospital y Famara"	2:08
23.	"Los Abrazos Rotos"	3:01
24.	"Vitamin C" (Remastered 2004) (Can)	3:34
25.	"Robot Oeuf" (Uffie)	3:31
Total length:		57:17

== Accolades ==
List of awards and nominations
Year	Award	Category	Recipients and nominees	Result	Ref.
2009	European Film Awards	Best Composer	Alberto Iglesias	Won	
2010	Goya Awards	Best Original Score	Alberto Iglesias	Won	

== Personnel ==
Credits adapted from liner notes:

- Music composer, director, producer, conductor and concertmaster – Alberto Iglesias
- Co-producer – Javier Casado
- Concertmaster – Perry Montague-Mason
- Music coordinator – Ana Eusa, Javier Martín
- Orchestra contractor – Charlotte Matthews
- Recording, mixing and programming – José Luis Crespo
- Assistant mixing – Carlos Alberich, Carlos Del Río
- Music editor, assistant composer and copyist – David Cerrejón
- Score technical engineer – Chris Barrett, Laurence Greed
- Liner notes – Alberto Iglesias

Instruments

- Cello, violoncello – Anton Gakkel
- Double bass – Chris Laurence, Pablo Martín
- Electric guitar – Javier Crespo
- Harp – Skaila Kanga
- Kora – Samba Hamari Sy, Male, Maya Jobarteh
- Piano – Javier Casado
- Solo violin – Ara Malikian
- Tenor saxophone, duduk – Martin Robertson
- Viola – Julia Málkova, Peter Lale
- Violin – Egor Vasilenko, Laurentin Gregoresko, Laurentiu Gregoresko, Perry Montague-Mason
