= Leni Alexander =

German-Chilean composer (1924–2005)

- Born: Helene Sara Alexander; 8 June 1924; Breslau, Province of Lower Silesia, Free State of Prussia, Weimar Republic (now Poland)
- Died: 7 August 2005 (aged 81); Santiago, Chile
- Other name: Helene Sara Alexander Pollack
- Citizenship: German (1924–1940); Chilean (from 1951)
- Education: University of Chile, 1942; Conservatoire de Paris
- Occupation: Composer
- Spouse: Ernst Bodenhöfer (m. 1941)
- Children: 3, including Bastián Bodenhöfer
- Relatives: Miranda Bodenhöfer (granddaughter)

Helene Sara Alexander Pollack (née Alexander; 8 June 1924 – 7 August 2005) was a German-Chilean modernist composer who was among the first to experiment with electronic music in Chile. She fled to Chile in 1939 to escape the Nazi regime in Germany and eventually became a naturalised Chilean citizen in 1951. Alexander was also known for her efforts to promote Chilean and Latin American music across Europe, in addition to her musical educational schemes in Chile.

== Early life and education ==
Helene Sara Alexander was born on 8 June 1924 in Breslau, Province of Lower Silesia (present-day Wrocław, Poland) to a Jewish family. Alexander's father, Max Alexander (1898–1962), was a publishing executive and her mother, Ilse Pollack (1894–1964), was an opera singer. Alexander grew up in Hamburg where she first studied piano.

In 1938, the family survived Kristallnacht and Alexander's stepfather Siegfried Urias (1895–1953), a lawyer and chairman of the Reichsbund jüdischer Frontsoldaten in Hamburg, was stripped of his law credentials by the Nazi regime. In April 1939, Alexander, her mother and step-father fled Nazi Germany on one of the last German ships destined to Santiago. On 28 October 1940, Nazi regime stripped Alexander of her German citizenship.

In Santiago, Alexander studied piano under Rudy Lehmann (1913–1975), the cello under Hans Loewe and harmony and counterpoint under Lucila Césped. Alexander later studied psychology at the University of Chile, where she specialized Montessori method of teaching for children with disabilities. In 1942, Alexander graduated and beginning working with young people and children with disabilities. During this period Alexander developed her interest in composition.

Between 1949 and 1953, Alexander studied with Dutch composer Fré Focke. To further her musical studies, she travelled to Paris to study with Olivier Messiaen at the Conservatoire de Paris, then tutored with Rene Leibowitz. She would later also be taught by Bruno Maderna and Luigi Nono.

== Career ==
In 1955, Alexander returned to Chile. New York Symphony Orchestra conductor Dimitri Mitropoulos commissioned Alexander to compose a piece for the orchestra in 1959. She represented Chile at the International Society for Contemporary Music in Cologne in 1960. Whilst she was in Germany, she used the West German Radio's electronics studio to experiment with the electronic genre, becoming one of the first Chilean composers to do so. Between 1963 and 1968, she continued to focus on electronic music, composing a number of pieces.

In 1969, Alexander was awarded the Guggenheim Fellowship and moved to Paris, where she befriended Pierre Boulez and John Cage. That same year, she also began working for a year at the electronic studio at Columbia University. Following the 1973 Chilean coup d'état, Alexander remained in Paris as a supporter of the Unidad Popular.

Alexander was heavily invested in promoting Chilean and Latin American music abroad, and once stated that the "permanent cultural exchange between Latin America and Europe seems essential". One of the ways she did this was creating pieces to be played on West German Radio. She also focused on improving public knowledge about contemporary music within Chile via multiple educational projects.

Besides her modernist work, Alexander also composed for film, television and the theatre.

== Personal life ==
In 1941, Alexander married the architect Ernst Bodenhöfer. Alexander and Bodenhöfer had three children including Andreas Alexander Bodenhöfer, a composer, and Bastián Bodenhöfer, an actor, theater director, musician and cultural manager. Alexander was the grandmother of Miranda Bodenhöfer, a ballet dancer and actress, Maira Bodenhöfer, an actress, and Damian Bodenhöfer, a model and actor.

In 1951, Alexander officially gained Chilean citizenship. In later life, she split her time living in Chile, Cologne and Paris.

On 7 August 2005 Alexander died in Santiago, aged 81.

== Works ==
Selected works include:

- String Quartet (1957)
- Cantata of death in the morning (1960)
- Aulicio
- Aulicio II
- Méralo for guitar (1972) (dedicated and premiered by Leo Brouwer)
- Ellos se perdieron en el espacio estrellado for orchestra (1975)
- Chacabuco: Ciudades fantasmas, hörspiel (1994)
- Cuando aún no conocía tu nombre (1996)

== Discography ==
- Jezira Santiago de Chile: Proyecto FONDART 2000.
- Homenaje Santiago de Chile: Proyecto FONDART 2009.
