= 24th Goya Awards =

- Date: 14 February 2010
- Site: Palacio Municipal de Congresos de Madrid
- Hosted by: Andreu Buenafuente

Highlights
- Best Film: Cell 211
- Best Actor: Luis Tosar; Cell 211
- Best Actress: Lola Dueñas; Me, Too
- Most awards: Cell 211 (8)
- Most nominations: Cell 211 (16)

Television coverage
- Network: La 1
- Viewership: 4.6 million (26.4%)

The 24th Goya Awards ceremony, presented by the Academy of Cinematographic Arts and Sciences of Spain, took place at the Palacio Municipal de Congresos in Madrid on 14 February 2010. The gala was hosted by Andreu Buenafuente.

Cell 211 won the award for Best Film. Antonio Mercero was recognised with the Honorary Goya Award although, suffering from an advanced stage of Alzheimer's disease, he did not attend the ceremony.

== Winners and nominees ==
The winners and nominees are listed as follows:

| Best Film: Cell 211; Agora; The Dancer and the Thief; The Secret in Their Eyes | Best Director: Daniel Monzón – Cell 211; Alejandro Amenábar – Agora; Fernando Trueba – The Dancer and the Thief; Juan José Campanella – The Secret in Their Eyes |
| Best Actor: Luis Tosar – Cell 211; Jordi Mollà – The Consul of Sodom; Ricardo Darín – The Secret in Their Eyes; Antonio de la Torre – Fat People | Best Actress: Lola Dueñas – Me, Too; Rachel Weisz – Agora; Penélope Cruz – Broken Embraces; Maribel Verdú – Tetro |
| Best Supporting Actor: Raúl Arévalo – Fat People; Carlos Bardem – Cell 211; Antonio Resines – Cell 211; Ricardo Darín – The Dancer and the Thief | Best Supporting Actress: Marta Etura – Cell 211; Vicky Peña – The Consul of Sodom; Pilar Castro – Fat People; Verónica Sánchez – Fat People |
| Best Original Screenplay: Alejandro Amenábar, Mateo Gil – Agora; Rafael Cobos, Alberto Rodríguez – After; Daniel Sánchez Arévalo – Fat People; Pedro Almodóvar – Broken Embraces | Best Adapted Screenplay: Jorge Guerricaechevarría, Daniel Monzón – Cell 211; Antonio Skármeta, Fernando Trueba, Jonás Trueba – The Dancer and the Thief; Miguel Dalmau, Miguel Ángel Fernández, Joaquín Górriz, Sigfrid Monleón – The Consul of Sodom; Juan José Campanella, Eduardo Sacheri – The Secret in Their Eyes |
| Best New Actor: Alberto Ammann – Cell 211; Fernando Albizu – Fat People; Gorka Otxoa – Friend Zone; Pablo Pineda – Me, Too | Best New Actress: Soledad Villamil – The Secret in Their Eyes; Blanca Romero – After; Leticia Herrero – Fat People; Nausicaa Bonnin – Three Days With the Family |
| Best Spanish Language Foreign Film: The Secret in Their Eyes · Argentina; Dawson Isla 10 · Chile; Giant · Uruguay; The Milk of Sorrow · Peru | Best European Film: Slumdog Millionaire · United Kingdom; The Class · France; Let the Right One In · Sweden; Welcome to the Sticks · France |
| Best New Director: Mar Coll – Three Days With the Family; David Planell – The Shame; Borja Cobeaga – Friend Zone; Antonio Naharro, Álvaro Pastor – Me, Too | Best Animated Film: Planet 51; Animal Channel; Pérez, el ratoncito de tus sueños 2; The Aviators |
| Best Cinematography: Xavi Giménez – Agora; Álex Catalán – After; Carles Gusi – Cell 211; Félix Monti – The Secret in Their Eyes | Best Editing: Mapa Pastor – Cell 211; Nacho Ruiz Capillas – Agora; David Pinillos, Nacho Ruiz Capillas – Fat People; Carmen Frías – The Dancer and the Thief |
| Best Art Direction: Guy Hendrix Dyas – Agora; Antón Laguna – Cell 211; Verónica Estudillo – The Dancer and the Thief; Marcelo Pont – The Secret in Their Eyes | Best Production Supervision: José Luis Escolar – Agora; Alicia Tellería – Cell 211; Cristina Zumárraga – Che Part 2: Guerrilla; Eduardo Castro – The Dancer and the Thief |
| Best Sound: Sergio Burmann, Jaime Fernández, Carlos Faruolo – Cell 211; Peter Glossop, Glenn Freemantle – Agora; Pierre Gamet, Nacho Royo-Villanova, Pelayo Gutiérrez – The Dancer and the Thief; Aitor Berenguer, Marc Orts, Fabiola Ordoyo – Map of the Sounds of Tokyo | Best Special Effects: Chris Reynolds, Félix Bergés – Agora; Raúl Romanillos, Guillermo Orbe – Cell 211; Salvador Santana, Àlex Villagrasa – REC 2; Pau Costa, Lluís Castells – Spanish Movie |
| Best Costume Design: Gabriella Pescucci – Agora; Lala Huete – The Dancer and the Thief; Cristina Rodríguez – The Consul of Sodom; Sonia Grande – Broken Embraces | Best Makeup and Hairstyles: Jan Sewell, Suzanne Stokes-Munton – Agora; Raquel Fidalgo, Inés Rodríguez – Cell 211; José Antonio Sánchez, Paquita Núñez – The Consul of Sodom; Ana Lozano, Massimo Gattabrusi – Broken Embraces |
| Best Original Score: Alberto Iglesias – Broken Embraces; Dario Marianelli – Agora; Roque Baños – Cell 211; Federico Jusid – The Secret in Their Eyes | Best Original Song: "Yo también" by Guille Milkyway – Me, Too; "Agallas vs. Escamas" by Hugo Silva – Guts; "Stick It to the Man" by Tom Cawte – Planet 51; "Spanish Song" by Alameda Do Soulna – Spanish Movie |
| Best Fictional Short Film: Dime que yo; La Tama; Lala; Terapia | Best Animated Short Film: The Lady and the Reaper; Alma; Margarita; Tachaaan! |
| Best Documentary Film: Garbo: The Spy; Cómicos; La mirada de Ouka Leele; Últimos testigos: Fraga Iribarne – Carrillo, comunista | Best Documentary Short Film: Flores de Ruanda; Doppelgänger; En un lugar del cine; Luchadoras |

=== Films with multiple nominations and awards ===
Films with multiple nominations
| Nominations | Film |
|---|---|
| 16 | Cell 211 |
| 13 | Agora |
| 9 | The Dancer and the Thief |
| 9 | The Secret in Their Eyes |
| 8 | Fat People |
| 5 | Broken Embraces |
| 5 | The Consul of Sodom |
| 4 | Me, Too |
| 3 | After |
| 2 | Friend Zone |
| 2 | Three Days With the Family |
| 2 | Planet 51 |
| 2 | Spanish Movie |

Films with multiple awards
| Awards | Film |
|---|---|
| 8 | Cell 211 |
| 7 | Agora |
| 2 | The Secret in Their Eyes |
| 2 | Me, Too |

== Honorary Goya ==
- Antonio Mercero
