= Brain Drain (film) =

- Theatrical release poster
- Spanish: Fuga de cerebros
- Directed by: Fernando González Molina
- Written by: Curro Velázquez; Álex Pina
- Produced by: Daniel Écija; Mercedes Gamero; Pablo Olivares
- Starring: Mario Casas; Amaia Salamanca; Alberto Amarilla; Canco Rodríguez; Gorka Lasaosa; Pablo Penedo
- Cinematography: Sergio Delgado
- Edited by: Irene Blecua
- Music by: Manel Santiesteban; Cecilia Krull
- Production company: A3 Films
- Distributed by: Hispano FoxFilm
- Release date: 24 April 2009
- Running time: 104 minutes
- Country: Spain
- Languages: Spanish; English
- Box office: €7 million

Brain Drain (Spanish: Fuga de cerebros) is a 2009 Spanish romantic comedy film directed by Fernando González Molina and starring Mario Casas and Amaia Salamanca. The film is an A3 Films production.

The production started on 14 July 2008 in Madrid and Gijón, and its premier was on 24 April 2009. Due to great success at the Spanish box office, the film spawned off a sequel, Brain Drain 2 (2011) and an Italian remake Fuga di Cervelli (2013).

== Plot ==
The film begins with an 18 year old Emilio (Mario Casas) who credits his amorous misadventures with Natalia (Amaia Salamanca) to his physical problems (orthodoncy, orthosis, etc.) When he is 18, he finally gets rid of all his dental paraphernalia and has a chance to confess to Natalia his love. But when she gets a student grant to attend Oxford University (England), all his friends try to help him by going to Oxford too with fake grants.

However, once there, the group must confront several problems, such as their poor English and their disabilities and quirks (one of Emilio's friends is blind, another is paraplegic and the last one is a drug dealer). Despite their impediments, they do their best to help Emilio get closer to Natalia, with disastrous results.

== Cast ==
- Mario Casas as Emilio Carbajosa Benito
- Amaia Salamanca as Natalia
- Alberto Amarilla as José Manuel "Chuli" Sánchez Expósito
- Gorka Lasaosa as Rafael "Ruedas" Garrido Calvo
- Pablo Penedo as Felipe "Corneto" Roldán Salas
- Canco Rodríguez as Raimundo "Cabra" Vargas Montoya
- Blanca Suárez as "Angelical voice"/Speaker
- Sarah Mühlhause as Claudia
- Simon Cohen as Edward Chamberlain
- Carlos Santos as Potro
- Reg Wilson as Professor
- Asunción Balaguer as Emilio's grandmother
- Joan Dalmau as Emilio grandfather
- Álex Angulo as Cecilio Garrido
- Loles León as Rita Calvo
- David Fernández Ortiz as Loren Sánchez
- José Luis Gil as Manuel Roldán
- Mariano Peña as Julián Roldán
- Fernando Guillén as Natalia's grandfather
- Antonio Resines as Natalia's father
- Óscar Casas as Young Emilio Carbajosa Benito (11 years old)
- Oliver Vigil as Young Emilio Carbajosa Benito (8 years old)
- Andrea Diaz as Young Natalia

== Reception ==
In its first week at the Spanish theaters, the film reached €1.22 mill at the office box and nearly 200,000 spectators saw it. With those takings, Brain Drain was the first on the Spanish box and a hit forward to State of Play.

Meanwhile, in the international box office: in United States, the film got $1,614,121 in its first weekend at cinemas.

The total income amounted to almost €7 million, becoming the biggest blockbuster Spanish film in 2009.

The film itself, however, was panned by critics. On Letterboxd the movie has a 2-star rating.

== See also ==
- List of Spanish films of 2009
