= The Shame (film) =

- Theatrical release poster
- Spanish: La vergüenza
- Directed by: David Planell
- Starring: Alberto San Juan; Natalia Mateo; Norma Martínez; Marta Aledo; Brandon Lastra; Esther Ortega
- Cinematography: Charly Planell
- Edited by: David Pinillos
- Music by: Christopher Slaski
- Production company: Avalon PC
- Distributed by: Avalon
- Release dates: 17 April 2009 (Málaga); 30 April 2009 (Spain)
- Country: Spain
- Language: Spanish

The Shame (Spanish: La vergüenza) is a 2009 Spanish film directed by David Planell in his feature debut. It stars Alberto San Juan and Natalia Mateo.

== Plot ==
An upper-middle class couple formed by Pepe and Lucía decide to "return" a child originally from Peru (Manu) whom they have fostered.

== Cast ==
- Alberto San Juan as Pepe
- Natalia Mateo as Lucía
- Norma Martínez as Rosa
- Marta Aledo as Irene
- Brandon Lastra as Manu
- Esther Ortega

== Production ==
The film is an Avalon Films production, with the collaboration of TVE and support from ICAA.

== Release ==
The Shame screened as the first film in competition at the 12th Málaga Film Festival in April 2009. Distributed by Avalon, it was theatrically released in Spain on 30 April 2009.

== Reception ==
Jonathan Holland of Variety deemed the "thought-provoking" debut film to be a "solid drama" "buoyed by a well-observed script and alert perfs", although "much good work is undone by a rushed, soapy final reel".

Irene Crespo of Cinemanía rated the film 3½ out of 5 stars, writing that Planell manages to "stir with anger our social and family conscience".

Pere Vall of Fotogramas rated the film 3 out of 5 stars, deeming it to be a "lucid naturalistic chronicle of a couple in ideological crisis".

== Accolades ==
Year	Award	Category	Nominee(s)	Result	Ref.
2009	12th Málaga Film Festival	Golden Biznaga		Won	
2009	12th Málaga Film Festival	Best Original Screenplay	David Planell	Won	
2010	24th Goya Awards	Best New Director	David Planell	Nominated	
2010	19th Actors and Actresses Union Awards	Best Film Actress in a Secondary Role	Marta Aledo	Nominated	

== See also ==
- List of Spanish films of 2009
