= Gominolas =

- Genre: Comedy
- Directed by: Nacho G. Velilla
- Starring: Fernando Tejero; Arturo Valls; Kira Miró; Gorka Lasaosa
- Composer: Fernando Velázquez
- Country of origin: Spain
- Original language: Spanish
- No. of seasons: 1
- No. of episodes: 7

Production
- Executive producer: Nacho G. Velilla
- Running time: 30 min (approx.)
- Production company: Globomedia

Original release
- Network: Cuatro
- Release: 6 November – 18 December 2007

Gominolas (lit. 'Gummies') is a Spanish comedy television series. Produced by Globomedia, it aired on Cuatro from November to December 2007. It was presented as featuring an "acid and corrosive" brand of humour.

== Premise ==
The fiction follows the lives of Benja, Bruno, Susana and Tinín, four of the five members of Gominolas (a fictional teen pop band popular in the 1980s, somewhat reminiscent of the real band Parchís) but in their thirties, 20 years later, meeting on the occasion of the death of Ingrid (the fifth member), when all of them have broken, failed lives, both at the professional and personal level.

== Cast ==
- Fernando Tejero as Benja.
- Arturo Valls as Bruno.
- Kira Miró as Susana.
- Gorka Lasaosa as Tinín.
- Lluís Homar as Jimmy Star, Benja's father.
- Mariona Ribas as Noelia, Benja's sister.
- Fernando Otero as Moncho, Susana's husband.
- Fernando Albizu as Richi, a fan of the group.
- Borja Sicilia as Samuel, son of Ingrid, the deceased member of Gominolas whose death brings the group together.

== Production and release ==
Produced by Globomedia, the series was created by Nacho García Velilla, credited as executive producer, director and screenplay coordinator. The musical score was a work by Fernando Velázquez. Episodes featured a length of 30 minutes, an unusual format for Spanish series. The series pioneered the use of single-camera setup in Spain. Extensively promoted by the channel, the first episode premiered on 6 November 2007, earning the best viewership figures in the history of the channel, with over 3 million viewers and a 17.1% audience share. Interest in the series rapidly waned and the broadcasting run ended on 18 December with a meagre 6.7% share. While the average figures (1,985,000 viewers, 10.4% share) were above the channel's average, the series was not renovated.

Series	Episodes	Originally released		Average viewership	Share (%)	Ref.
Series	Episodes	First released	Last released	Average viewership	Share (%)	Ref.
1	7	6 November 2007	18 December 2007	1,985,000	10.4	
