= Fat People =

- Theatrical release poster
- Spanish: Gordos
- Directed by: Daniel Sánchez Arévalo
- Written by: Daniel Sánchez Arévalo
- Produced by: José Antonio Félez; Antón Reixa
- Starring: Antonio de la Torre; Roberto Enríquez; Verónica Sánchez; Raúl Arévalo; Leticia Herrero; Fernando Albizu; María Morales; Pilar Castro; Adam Jezierski; Marta Martín; Teté Delgado; Kaarny Thomas
- Cinematography: Juan Carlos Gómez
- Edited by: David Pinillos; Nacho Ruiz Capillas
- Music by: Pascal Gaigne
- Production companies: Tesela P.C.; Filmanova Invest
- Distributed by: Alta Films
- Release dates: 11 June 2009 (Santander); 11 September 2009 (Spain)
- Running time: 110 minutes
- Country: Spain
- Language: Spanish

Fat People (Spanish: Gordos) is a 2009 Spanish comedy-drama film written and directed by Daniel Sánchez Arévalo. The ensemble cast features Antonio de la Torre, Roberto Enríquez, Verónica Sánchez, Raúl Arévalo, Leticia Herrero, Fernando Albizu, María Morales, Pilar Castro, Adam Jezierski, Marta Martín and Teté Delgado.

== Plot ==
The plot tracks five personal stories connected to a therapy group managed by Abel that helps people with a condition of obesity.

== Cast ==
- Antonio de la Torre as Enrique
- Roberto Enríquez as Abel
- Verónica Sánchez as Paula
- Raúl Arévalo as Álex
- Leticia Herrero as Sofía
- Fernando Albizu as Andrés
- María Morales as Leonor
- Pilar Castro as Pilar
- Adam Jezierski as Luis
- Marta Martín as Nuria
- Teté Delgado as Beatriz

== Production ==
The film was produced by Filmanova and Tesela Producciones Cinematográficas and had the participation of TVE and Canal+.

== Release ==
The film received a pre-screening on 11 June 2009 at the Sala Argenta of the Palacio de Festivales de Cantabria in Santander. It also screened at the Venice Days. Distributed by Alta Films, it was theatrically released in Spain on 11 September 2009.

== Accolades ==
Year	Award	Category	Nominee(s)	Result	Ref.
2010	24th Goya Awards	Best Actor	Antonio de la Torre	Nominated	
2010	24th Goya Awards	Best Supporting Actor	Raúl Arévalo	Won	
2010	24th Goya Awards	Best Supporting Actress	Pilar Castro	Nominated	
2010	24th Goya Awards	Best Supporting Actress	Verónica Sánchez	Nominated	
2010	24th Goya Awards	Best Original Screenplay	Daniel Sánchez Arévalo	Nominated	
2010	24th Goya Awards	Best New Actor	Fernando Albizu	Nominated	
2010	24th Goya Awards	Best New Actress	Leticia Herrero	Nominated	
2010	24th Goya Awards	Best Editing	David Pinillos and Nacho Ruiz Capillas	Nominated	
2010	9th Mestre Mateo Awards	Best Feature Film		Nominated	
2010	9th Mestre Mateo Awards	Best Director	Daniel Sánchez Arévalo	Nominated	
2010	9th Mestre Mateo Awards	Best Supporting Actress	Teté Delgado	Nominated	
2010	9th Mestre Mateo Awards	Best Art Direction	Curru Garabal	Won	
2010	19th Actors and Actresses Union Awards	Best Actor in a Leading Role (film)	Antonio de la Torre	Nominated	
2010	19th Actors and Actresses Union Awards	Best Actor in a Secondary Role (film)	Raúl Arévalo	Nominated	
2010	19th Actors and Actresses Union Awards	Best Actress in a Secondary Role (film)	Verónica Sánchez	Won	
2010	19th Actors and Actresses Union Awards	Best Actor in a Minor Role (film)	Fernando Albizu	Won	
2010	19th Actors and Actresses Union Awards	Best Actress in a Minor Role (film)	Pilar Castro	Won	

== See also ==
- List of Spanish films of 2009
