= Che (soundtrack) =

2008 film score

Che (Original Motion Picture Soundtrack)

Film score by Alberto Iglesias
- Released: 16 December 2008
- Recorded: 2008
- Studios: Air Studios, London; Cata Studios, Madrid; Red Led Studios, Madrid
- Genre: Film score
- Length: 58:14
- Label: Varèse Sarabande
- Producer: Alberto Iglesias

Alberto Iglesias chronology
The Kite Runner (2007)	Che (2008)	Broken Embraces (2009)

Che (Original Motion Picture Soundtrack) is the film score composed by Alberto Iglesias to the 2008 two-part epic biographical film Che directed by Steven Soderbergh, with Benicio del Toro as the Argentine Marxist revolutionary Ernesto "Che" Guevara. The film score was released through Varèse Sarabande on December 16, 2008.

== Background ==
Alberto Iglesias composed the film score in his first and only collaboration with Soderbergh. Iglesias noted that Soderbergh wanted the film to not have any score, but eventually decided that music should be the only way to underline the psychological aspects. The score for Part 1: The Argentine was designed in a triumphant and energetic manner, while Part 2: Guerrilla had an increasingly tense and dissonant score that sparsely used to heighten the tensions of the war and revolution. The score was recorded at the AIR Studios in London, Cata Studios and Red Led Studios in Madrid, with an 80-piece orchestra, conducted and orchestrated by Iglesias himself. Varèse Sarabande released the score album on 16 December 2008.

== Reception ==
Jonathan Broxton of Movie Music UK noted that "there is clearly a great deal of intelligence and great craftsmanship on display here" but the "lack of tangible element" in the score left him distracted. In contrast, James Southall of Movie Wave called it "one of the year's best albums" and added "The subtlety, the nuance—it's rare in film music these days to find such qualities, rarer still in a comparatively high-profile film."

Todd McCarthy of Variety wrote "Alberto Iglesias' score comes and goes in abrupt fashion, sometimes to oddly melodramatic effect." A. O. Scott of The New York Times called it an "excellent score, less austere in its moods and effects". Tom Lynch of Newcity wrote "Too much cannot be said about Alberto Iglesias' remarkable, beautiful score, which provides emotional undercurrent and patches of mood to sometimes-austere passages." Alonso Duralde of Today wrote "Alberto Iglesias' score never swells up so we know we're supposed to be moved." Amy Taubin of The Criterion Collection wrote "the jagged undercurrent of Alberto Iglesias's score is a great tension builder".

== Track listing ==
No.	Title	Length
1.	"Ese Hombre Es El Che Guevara"	2:53
2.	"Ten Years Earlier (December 1, 1956)"	1:59
3.	"Sierra Maestra"	4:59
4.	"Landscape"	1:34
5.	"I Want To Take The Revolution To Latin America"	2:08
6.	"New York, December 1964"	1:02
7.	"Across Mount Turquino"	2:51
8.	"March"	2:35
9.	"Some Craziness Is Good"	3:04
10.	"Luces Y Sombras"	2:15
11.	"Ambush"	3:43
12.	"Political Skills"	2:26
13.	"Military Skills"	1:41
14.	"Camino A La Habana"	2:01
15.	"Nancahuazu Canyon, March 23, 1967"	2:57
16.	"Doctor Guevara"	1:43
17.	"Santa Clara"	1:59
18.	"Patria O Muerte"	3:54
19.	"La Higuera, October 9, 1967"	5:38
20.	"Balderrama"	3:57
21.	"Fusil Contra Fusil"	2:55
Total length:		58:14

== Personnel ==
Credits adapted from liner notes:

- Composer and producer – Alberto Iglesias
- Programming and arrangement – Javier Casado, Jorge Magaz
- Sound engineer – Fiona Cruickshank, Jake Jackson
- Assistant sound engineer – Diego Balduque, Joaquín Pizarro, Rafael Soler
- Recording – José Luis Crespo, Raúl Quílez
- Mixing – José Luis Crespo
- Mastering – Patricia Sullivan Fourstar
- Executive producer – Robert Townson, Ana Eusa, Javier Martín
- Musical assistance – David Cerrejón

Orchestra

- Conductor – Alberto Iglesias
- Orchestrator – Alberto Iglesias, Perry Montague-Mason
- Orchestra leader – Perry Montague-Mason
- Orchestra contractor – Isobel Griffiths
- Assistant orchestra contractor – Charlotte Matthew

Instruments

- Accordion – Javier Casado
- Alto flute – Helen Keen
- Bass flute – Anna Noakes
- Cello – Julia Mallova
- English horn – Jane Marshall
- Guitar – Alfredo Marugan, Javier Crespo
- Harp – Skaila Kanga
- Piccolo flute – Jonathan Snowden
- Saxophone – Andrés Gomis
- String ensemble – Fatum String Trio
- Trumpet –Andrew Crowley
- Viola – Peter Lale
- Violin – Anton Gakkel, Mariano Moraru
- Vocals – Mercedes Sosa, Silvio Rodríguez
- Woodwinds – Andres Gomis, Javier Paxariño

== Accolades ==
Awards	Category	Recipient(s)	Result	Ref.
CEC Awards	Best Score	Alberto Iglesias	Nominated	
Goya Awards	Best Original Score	Alberto Iglesias	Nominated	
International Film Music Critics Association	Best Original Score for a Drama Film	Alberto Iglesias	Nominated	
