= The Dancer and the Thief =

- Theatrical release poster
- Spanish: El baile de la victoria
- Directed by: Fernando Trueba
- Screenplay by: Fernando Trueba; Jonás Trueba; Antonio Skármeta
- Based on: El baile de la victoria by Antonio Skármeta
- Produced by: Jessica Berman
- Starring: Ricardo Darín; Abel Ayala; Miranda Bodenhöfer; Ariadna Gil; Julio Jung; Mario Guerra
- Cinematography: Julián Ledesma
- Edited by: Carmen Frías
- Production company: Fernando Trueba PC
- Distributed by: Notro Films
- Release date: 27 November 2009 (Spain)
- Running time: 127 minutes
- Countries: Spain; Chile
- Language: Spanish

The Dancer and the Thief (Spanish: El baile de la victoria) is a 2009 drama film directed by Fernando Trueba. It is an adaptation of the novel of the same name by author Antonio Skármeta. It was selected as the Spanish entry for the Best Foreign Language Film at the 82nd Academy Awards, but it was not nominated.

== Plot ==
Following the 1988 national plebiscite and the arrival of democracy in Chile, the president declares a general amnesty for all prisoners who were convicted of non-violent crimes.

Among these released prisoners are the young Ángel Santiago and the veteran Vergara Grey, a notorious thief. The two have different aspirations: while Vergara Grey only wishes to reunite with his family and start anew, Ángel dreams of seeking revenge against the prison warden and carrying out a major heist with Grey. However, Ángel's plans change when he meets the young Victoria, a ballet dancer who hasn't spoken since losing her parents as a child during the Chilean dictatorship.

The lives of all three characters are irreversibly transformed as they face a new future.

== Cast ==
- Ricardo Darín as Vergara Grey
- Abel Ayala as Ángel Santiago
- Miranda Bodenhöfer as Victoria Ponce
- Ariadna Gil as Teresa Capriatti
- Julio Jung as warden Santoro

== Production ==
Adapting the Antonio Skármeta's novel El baile de la Victoria, Fernando Trueba, Jonás Trueba and Skármeta himself collaborated in the writing of the screenplay. The film was produced by Fernando Trueba P.C. Shooting started in Chile in July 2008.

Trueba said of the film: “I am proud of how I have portrayed [Santiago], I believe it is very interesting visually. This is above all a romantic film, but with elements of comedy and film noir. It’s film-noir and it is western, it’s realist and very romantic. Definitively Latin American.”

== Release ==
Distributed by Notro Films, the film was theatrically released in Spain on 27 November 2009. The film was selected as the Spanish entry for the Best Foreign Language Film at the 82nd Academy Awards, but it was not nominated.

== Reception ==
=== Accolades ===
Year	Award	Category	Nominee(s)	Result	Ref.
2010	24th Goya Awards	Best Film		Nominated	
2010	24th Goya Awards	Best Director	Fernando Trueba	Nominated	
2010	24th Goya Awards	Best Adapted Screenplay	Antonio Skármeta, Fernando Trueba, Jonás Trueba	Nominated	
2010	24th Goya Awards	Best Supporting Actor	Ricardo Darín	Nominated	
2010	24th Goya Awards	Best Production Supervision	Eduardo Castro	Nominated	
2010	24th Goya Awards	Best Editing	Carmen Frías	Nominated	
2010	24th Goya Awards	Best Art Direction	Carmen Frías	Nominated	
2010	24th Goya Awards	Best Costume Design	Lala Huete	Nominated	
2010	24th Goya Awards	Best Sound	Pierre Gamet, Nacho Royo-Villanova, Pelayo Gutiérrez	Nominated	

== See also ==
- List of Spanish films of 2009
- Cinema of Chile
- List of submissions to the 82nd Academy Awards for Best Foreign Language Film
- List of Spanish submissions for the Academy Award for Best Foreign Language Film
