= After (2009 film) =

- Theatrical release poster
- Directed by: Alberto Rodríguez
- Screenplay by: Rafael Cobos
- Story by: Rafael Cobos; Alberto Rodríguez
- Produced by: José Antonio Félez
- Starring: Guillermo Toledo; Tristán Ulloa; Blanca Romero; Jesús Carroza; Ricardo de Barreiro; Valeria Alonso; Alicia Rubio; Maxi Iglesias; Álvaro Monje; Marta Solaz
- Cinematography: Alex Catalán
- Edited by: José Manuel Moyano
- Music by: Julio de la Rosa
- Production companies: Tesela PC; La Zanfoña Producciones
- Distributed by: Alta Classics
- Release dates: 17 October 2009 (Rome); 23 October 2009 (Spain)
- Country: Spain
- Language: Spanish

After is a 2009 Spanish drama film directed by Alberto Rodríguez which stars Guillermo Toledo, Tristán Ulloa and Blanca Romero.

== Plot ==
The plot tracks three friends (Julio, Manuel and Ana) nearing their forties with a sort of Peter Pan syndrome and lives full of full of dissatisfaction and loneliness. After they meet up, they embark on an attempt to enjoy the night full of sex, drugs and alcohol.

== Cast ==
- Guillermo Toledo as Julio
- Tristán Ulloa as Manuel
- Blanca Romero as Ana
- Jesús Carroza
- Marta Solaz
- Maxi Iglesias
- Daniel Grao
- Álvaro Monje
- Raúl del Pozo
- Valeria Alonso
- Ricardo de Barreiro
- Antonio Navarro
- Alicia Rubio
- Oliver Morellón
- Héctor Mora

== Production ==
The film is a Tesela PC and La Zanfoña Producciones production. Featuring a budget of around €2.5 million, filming began on 23 June 2008 and wrapped in September 2008. It was fully shot in Seville.

== Release ==
After screened at the 4th Rome Film Festival on 17 October 2009. Distributed by Alta Films, it was theatrically released in Spain on 23 October 2009.

== Reception ==
Javier Ocaña of El País wrote that Rodríguez's remarkable fourth feature film, consisting of "a journey into the depths of the night", and "led by three superb performances", is a collection of highly effective (even if sometimes overly marked) symbols.

Sergio F. Pinilla of Cinemanía scored 4 out of 5 stars, summing the film to be "a new generational portrait that revolves around the vertices of an isosceles triangle fumigated by sex, drugs and alcohol", knowing "how to transmit the uneasiness, sensuality and truth of a generation that is emotionally hopeless".

Robert Koehler of Variety assessed that the "aggressively vapid" film "is acid noir with a flashy surface", offering "little except examples of how not to live".

Manuel J. Lombardo of Diario de Sevilla wrote that Rodríguez's realistic style is blurred (Seville "never looked so ghostly"), while, vis-à-vis the performances, he pointed out that Guillermo Toledo's lysergic excesses are offset by Tristán Ulloa's neat academic restraint", while Blanca Romero comes out successful of her portrayal of chronic dissatisfaction.

== Accolades ==
Year	Award	Category	Nominee(s)	Result	Ref.
2010	24th Goya Awards	Best Original Screenplay	Rafael Cobos, Alberto Rodríguez	Nominated	
2010	24th Goya Awards	Best New Actress	Blanca Romero	Nominated	
2010	24th Goya Awards	Best Cinematography	Alex Catalán	Nominated	

== See also ==
- List of Spanish films of 2009
