= Three Days With the Family =

- Film poster
- Catalan: Tres dies amb la família
- Directed by: Mar Coll
- Screenplay by: Mar Coll; Valentina Viso
- Starring: Nausicaa Bonnín; Eduard Fernández; Philippine Leroy-Beaulieu; Francesc Orella; Ramon Fontserè
- Cinematography: Neus Ollé
- Edited by: Elena Ruiz
- Music by: Maikmaier
- Production company: Escándalo Films
- Release dates: 23 April 2009 (Málaga); 26 June 2009 (Spain)
- Languages: Catalan; Spanish; French

Three Days With the Family (Catalan: Tres dies amb la família) is a 2009 Spanish drama film directed by Mar Coll (in her directorial debut feature) which stars Nausicaa Bonnín alongside Eduard Fernández, Philippine Leroy-Beaulieu, Francesc Orella, and Ramon Fontserè.

== Plot ==
The plot tracks the three days in the life of a young woman based in Bourdeaux upon her return to Girona on occasion of her grandfather's funeral, thereby meeting with her relatives, members of the Catalan haute bourgeoisie.

== Cast ==
- Nausicaa Bonnín as Léa
- Eduard Fernández as Josep Maria
- Philippine Leroy-Beaulieu as Jöelle
- Ramon Fontserè as Pere
- Francesc Orella as Toni
- Amâlia Sancho as Virgínia
- Aida Oset as Mar
- Artur Busquets as Pau
- Isabel Rocatti as Montse
- Maria Ribera as Laia
- Greta Fernández as Bet
- Cristina Gamiz as Aurora
- Abel Zamora as Pere Jr.
- David Verdaguer as Jordi
- Mercè Compte as Maria
- Dafnis Balduz as Andreu

== Production ==
The film was produced by Escándalo Films in association with TVE and TVC.

== Release ==
The film was presented at the Málaga Film Festival in April 2009. It was released theatrically in Spain on 26 June 2009.

== Critical reception ==
Jonathan Holland of Variety deemed the film to be an "evocative portrait of a Catalan clan being unhappy in its own way".

Fernando Méndez-Leite of Fotogramas rated the film 4 out of 5 stars, hailing "the director's rigor and fine cruelty" as the film's best.

Cliff Doerksen of Chicago Reader described the film as a "rote domestic drama about an emotionally stunted upper-bourgeois Catalan clan".

== Accolades ==
Year	Award	Category	Nominee(s)	Result	Ref.
2010	2nd Gaudí Awards	Best Catalan-language Film		Won	
2010	2nd Gaudí Awards	Best Director	Mar Coll	Won	
2010	2nd Gaudí Awards	Best Screenplay	Mar Coll, Valentina Viso	Nominated	
2010	2nd Gaudí Awards	Best Actress	Nausicaa Bonnín	Won	
2010	2nd Gaudí Awards	Best Actor	Eduard Fernández	Nominated	
2010	24th Goya Awards	Best New Director	Mar Coll	Won	
2010	24th Goya Awards	Best New Actress	Nausicaa Bonnín	Nominated	

== See also ==
- List of Spanish films of 2009
