= Rachel Handlin =

American artist and photographer

Rachel Handlin (born 1995) is an American artist and photographer, recognized as "possibly" the first person with Down syndrome to earn a Master of Fine Arts degree. She graduated with a Bachelor of Fine Arts from the California Institute of the Arts and an M.F.A. from Pratt Institute. Her first solo exhibition, "strangers are friends I haven't met yet," was presented at White Columns in Manhattan in 2024, showcasing her work in photography, sculpture, and video art with a focus on community and disability visibility.

== See also ==
- Pablo Pineda
