= Nicolás Dueñas =

Spanish actor (1941–2019)

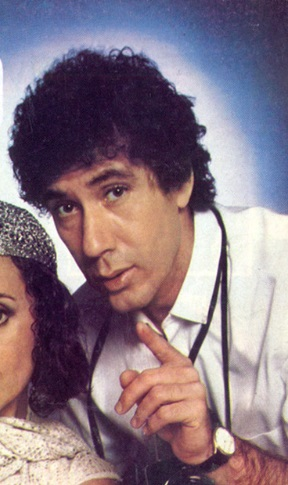
- Dueñas in 1984.
- Born: Nicolás Dueñas Navarro; 18 June 1941; Madrid, Spain
- Died: 2 November 2019 (aged 78); Madrid, Spain
- Occupation: Actor

Nicolás Dueñas Navarro (18 June 1941 – 2 November 2019) was a Spanish actor. He shot to fame with the theatre play 'Toc Toc'. Later, he became a regular actor in Spanish films and appeared in films like The Crime of Cuenca (1980), Gary Cooper, Who Art in Heaven (1980), Divinas palabras (1987) and Your Name Poisons My Dreams (1996). He also acted in a Television series named Aquí no hay quien viva.

He was the father of Goya Award-winning actress Lola Dueñas.
