= Alberto Amarilla =

Spanish actor (born 1980)

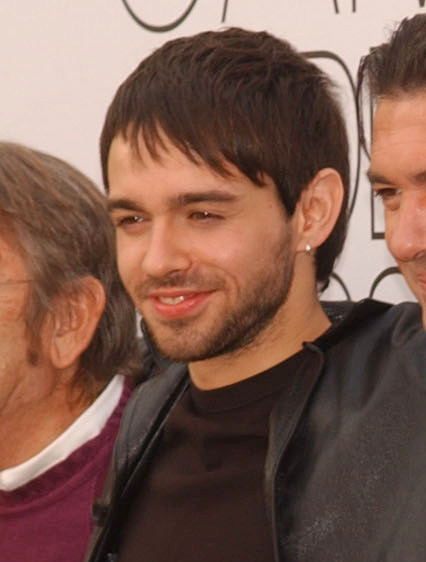
- Amarilla in 2006
- Born: Alberto Amarilla Bermejo; 20 October 1980 (age 44); Cáceres, Spain
- Occupation: Actor

Alberto Amarilla Bermejo (born 20 October 1980) is a Spanish actor.

== Life and career ==
Alberto Amarilla Bermejo was born in Cáceres on 20 October 1980. He received training as an actor at Málaga's Escuela Superior de Arte Dramático. His acting career began with minor credits in television series such as Arrayán, El comisario, and 7 vidas.

He made his film debut in Alejandro Amenábar's The Sea Inside (2004). Also in 2004, he joined the cast of comedy television series Mis adorables vecinos. He went on to star as Miguelito Dávila (a young man missing a kidney) in Antonio Banderas' Summer Rain (2006). His performance in the film earned him a nomination to the Goya Award for Best New Actor. He appeared in television series Acusados as Alex de la Torre, whereas he also landed film credits in Brain Drain (as Chuli), and Imago Mortis (as Bruno Márquez).

He joined season 5 of Money Heist to portray soldier Ramiro. He appeared in Amazon Prime Video series The Boarding School: Las Cumbres as Latin teacher and friar Elías, who died as he was pushed from the top of the bell tower in the end of season one.

In 2021, he joined season 10 of long-running soap opera Amar es para siempre to portray Marcos Salaverría, the Marquis of Benamazara's son-in-law. In 2024, he joined the cast of soap opera La Moderna to portray businessman and producer Agustín Comas Ferrer.

== Accolades ==
Year	Award	Category	Work	Result	Ref.
2007	21st Goya Awards	Best New Actor	Summer Rain	Nominated	
2010	19th Actors and Actresses Union Awards	Best Television Actor in a Minor Role	Acusados	Nominated	
2013	22nd Actors and Actresses Union Awards	Best Stage Actor in a Secondary Role	Lúcido	Nominated	
2022	30th Actors and Actresses Union Awards	Best Television Actor in a Minor Role	Money Heist	Nominated	
2025	33rd Actors and Actresses Union Awards	Best Stage Actor in a Secondary Role	Lorca por Saura	Won	
