= Marta Aledo =

Spanish actress (born 1978)

- Born: Marta González de Aledo; 2 May 1978 (age 47); Madrid, Spain
- Occupations: Actress; screenwriter; television director

Marta González de Aledo (born 2 May 1978) is a Spanish actress, screenwriter, and television director.

She is known for her participation in the series Locked Up on Antena 3 and FOX Spain in the role of Teresa "Tere" González, a young woman sentenced to 6 years in prison.

== Biography ==
Marta Aledo graduated in image and sound from the Facultad de Ciencias de la Información (Universidad Complutense de Madrid). She completed her academic training with several dance and interpretation courses. She debuted as an actress on television in 1997 with Al salir de clase. She has also been seen in highly regarded series on Spanish television such as Médico de familia, 7 vidas, Hospital Central and Águila Roja with supporting roles.

She starred in her debut in 1997 in the film Airbag by director Juanma Bajo Ulloa. She became best known in 2015, when she began playing the character "Tere" in the Spanish television series Locked Up. Her work as a director on the short film Seattle won several awards in 2018, such as the award for best screenplay at the Fugaz Awards for Spanish short films, a competition in which she received three nominations.

== Filmography ==
=== Film ===
- Airbag (1997)
- Talk show (2000)
- Kisses for Everyone (2000)
- El gran marciano (2000)
- The Hidden (2005)
- Something to Remember Me By (2005)
- Princesas (2005)
- Queens (2005)
- Dark Blue Almost Black (2006)
- Women in the Park (2006)
- 13 Roses (2007)
- Touch the Sky (2007)
- The Shame (2009)
- Broken Embraces (2009)
- I'm So Excited! (2013)
