= Fernando Albizu =

Spanish actor

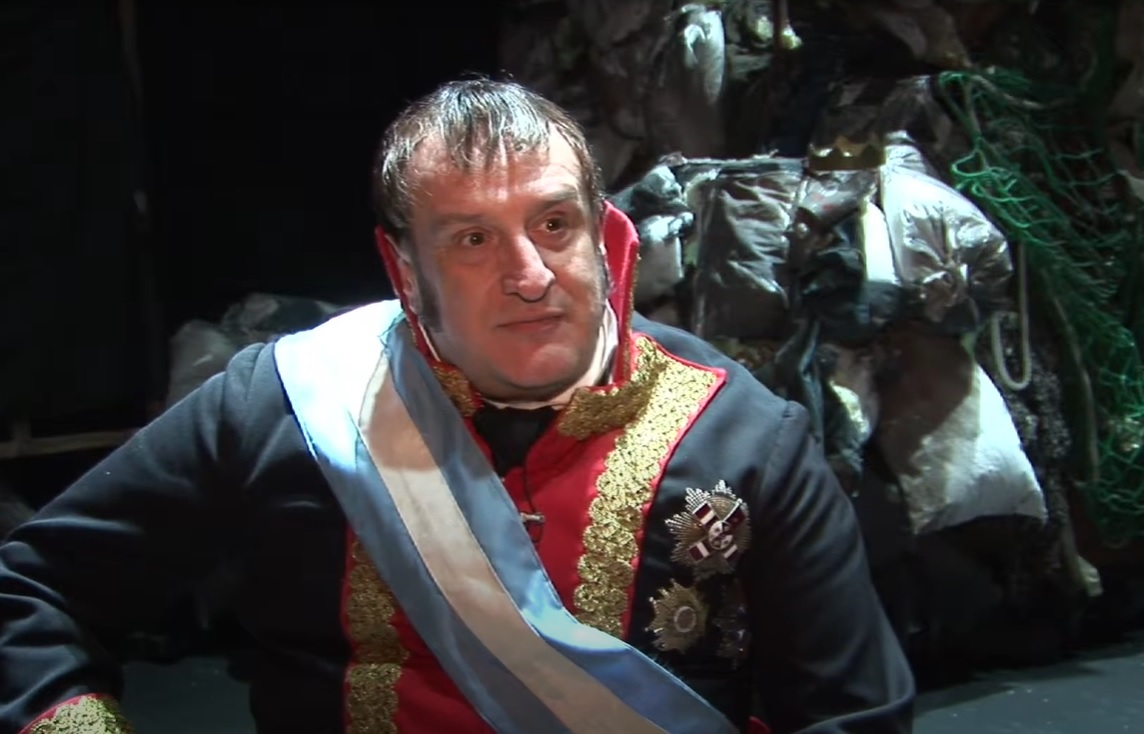
- Interviewed in 2015 at the Teatro Nuevo Apolo
- Born: 1963 (age 62–63); Vitoria-Gasteiz, Álava, Spain
- Occupation: Actor

Fernando Albizu (born 1963) is a Spanish television, film and stage actor.

== Biography ==
Albizu was born in Vitoria-Gasteiz, Álava, in 1963. Prior to starting a career as an actor, Albizu studied architecture and fashion design and worked as teacher of design and anatomy. Once he moved to Madrid, he came into contact with acting while he was working as a costume designer in a cabaret group, beginning to perform in stage thereafter. After 1994, he made his early film performances in short films. He also took part in stand-up comedy television shows such as Los irrepetibles and El club de la comedia.

Cast in episodic roles in television series such as Cuéntame, Hospital Central and Mis adorables vecinos, he landed a main role in the sitcom Casi perfectos (2004–2005), playing Manolo, one of siblings of the character played by Emilio Aragón. He starred as the evil Aníbal Torres in the telenovela El auténtico Rodrigo Leal, also featuring in Gominolas, playing a somewhat eccentric gay man and strong fan of the band giving name to the series. His role as Andrés in the film Fat People earned him a Goya award nomination for Best New Actor at age 46. His role as the security guard Román in the 2021 film The Good Boss earned him a nomination for Best Supporting Actor at the 36th Goya Awards.

== Filmography ==
=== Television ===
Year	Title	Role	Notes	Ref
2004–05	Casi perfectos	Manolo	Main	
2005	El auténtico Rodrigo Leal	Aníbal Torres	Main	
2007	Gominolas	Richi	Main	
2009–11	Doctor Mateo	Don Alejandro	Main	
2018–19	Amar es para siempre	Alfonso Álvarez de Tudela	Main. Season 7	
2020	White Lines	Pepe Martínez	Recurring	

=== Film ===
Year	Title	Role	Notes	Ref.
2003	Los novios búlgaros (Bulgarian Lovers)	Mogambo		
2009	Gordos (Fat People)	Andrés		
2021	El buen patrón (The Good Boss)	Román		
2023	Honeymoon	Andrés		
2024	The Price of Nonna's Inheritance	Luis		
2024	Deviant	Oscar		

== Accolades ==
Year	Award	Category	Work	Result	Ref.
2010	24th Goya Awards	Best New Actor	Fat People	Nominated	
2010	19th Actors and Actresses Union Awards	Best Film Actor in a Minor Role	Fat People	Won	
2022	36th Goya Awards	Best Supporting Actor	The Good Boss	Nominated	
