= Imago Mortis =

- Promotional poster
- Directed by: Stefano Bessoni
- Written by: Luiso Berdejo; Richard Stanley
- Produced by: Álvaro Augustín; Sonia Raule; Javier Ugarte
- Starring: Geraldine Chaplin; Oona Chaplin; Alberto Amarilla; Leticia Dolera
- Cinematography: Arnaldo Catinari
- Edited by: Raimondo Aiello
- Music by: Zacarías M. de la Riva
- Release date: 16 January 2009
- Running time: 113 minutes
- Countries: Italy; Spain
- Budget: €3 million

Imago Mortis is a 2009 Italian-Spanish film directed by Stefano Bessoni. The supernatural thriller stars Geraldine Chaplin and is the first major screen appearance of her daughter, Oona. Richard Stanley, one of the film's scriptwriters, described the film as a "sort of a neo-giallo taking off from Dario Argento's Four Flies on Grey Velvet by way of Umberto Lenzi's Spasmo and DaVinci Code." Speaking about his hopes for the film, Bessoni said; “My film aspires to del revive fantasy cinema, as is happening in Spain”. It was released in Italy on 16 January 2009.

== Plot ==
Bruno (Amarilla), a student at the rundown FW Murnau Film School comes across the thanatoscope, an ancient instrument of death. The instrument, created by scientist Girolamo Fumagalli immortalises on a plate the last image seen by the victim’s retina. The school's teachers, led by Countess Orsini (Geraldine Chaplin) are involved in a secretive plot concerning the instrument.

== Cast ==
- Geraldine Chaplin as Countess Orsini
- Oona Chaplin as Arianna
- Alberto Amarilla as Bruno
- Leticia Dolera as Leilou
- Álex Angulo as Caligari
- Jun Ichikawa as Aki
- Silvia De Santis as Elena

== Reception ==
The film debuted at no. 5 in Spain, grossing $309,175 in its first week. The film took nearly €460,000 on its opening weekend in Italy.

Zacarías M. de la Riva was nominated by the International Film Music Critics Association for Best Original Score for a Horror/Thriller film.
