= Guts (2009 film) =

- Theatrical release poster
- Directed by: Samuel Martín Mateos; Andrés Luque Pérez
- Written by: Javier Félix Echániz; Juan Antonio Gil Bengoa
- Produced by: Carlos Amoedo; Felipe Salas
- Starring: Hugo Silva; Carmelo Gómez
- Cinematography: Juan Carlos Gómez
- Music by: Xabi Font; Arturo Vaquero
- Production companies: Continental Producciones; Mucho Ruido Producciones; Agallas AIE
- Distributed by: Sony Pictures Releasing España
- Release date: August 4, 2009
- Running time: 99 minutes
- Country: Spain
- Language: Spanish
- Budget: €2.5 million

Guts (Spanish: Agallas) is a 2009 Spanish crime drama film starring Hugo Silva and Carmelo Gómez.

== Plot ==
Guts (Agallas) follows Sebas, a petty criminal recently released from prison. Instead of returning to a life of crime, he decides to seek legitimate employment at a small company in Galicia. However, his motivation is not purely honest—he suspects the company’s custodian, Regueira, has not built his wealth through legal means, especially not by selling crabs. When Sebas finally gets hired, Regueira quickly recognizes that the young man has "guts" and decides to take him under his wing as an assistant. The story unfolds around the world of drug trafficking in Spain’s Galician region, revealing the complex and dangerous dynamics between the characters.

== Cast ==
- Hugo Silva as Sebas
- Carmelo Gómez as Regueira
- Celso Bugallo as Raúl
- Carlos Sante as Antonio
- Mabel Rivera as Aunt Elvira
- Xavier Estévez as Couto
- Rula Blanco as Isolina
- Tomás Lijó as Manu
- Pepe Suevos as Domingo
- Alfonso Agra as Severo
- Yoíma Valdés as Rosa

== Production ==
The film was shot on location in Galicia in August and September 2008.

== Reception ==
The film's premiere was held at the Proyecciones Cinema in Madrid, Spain on September 3, 2009. Agallas opened in 180 theaters across Spain on August 4, 2009, and the film ranked ninth at the weekend box office with an opening gross of €280,000.

== See also ==
- List of Spanish films of 2009
