= Lola Dueñas =

Spanish actress

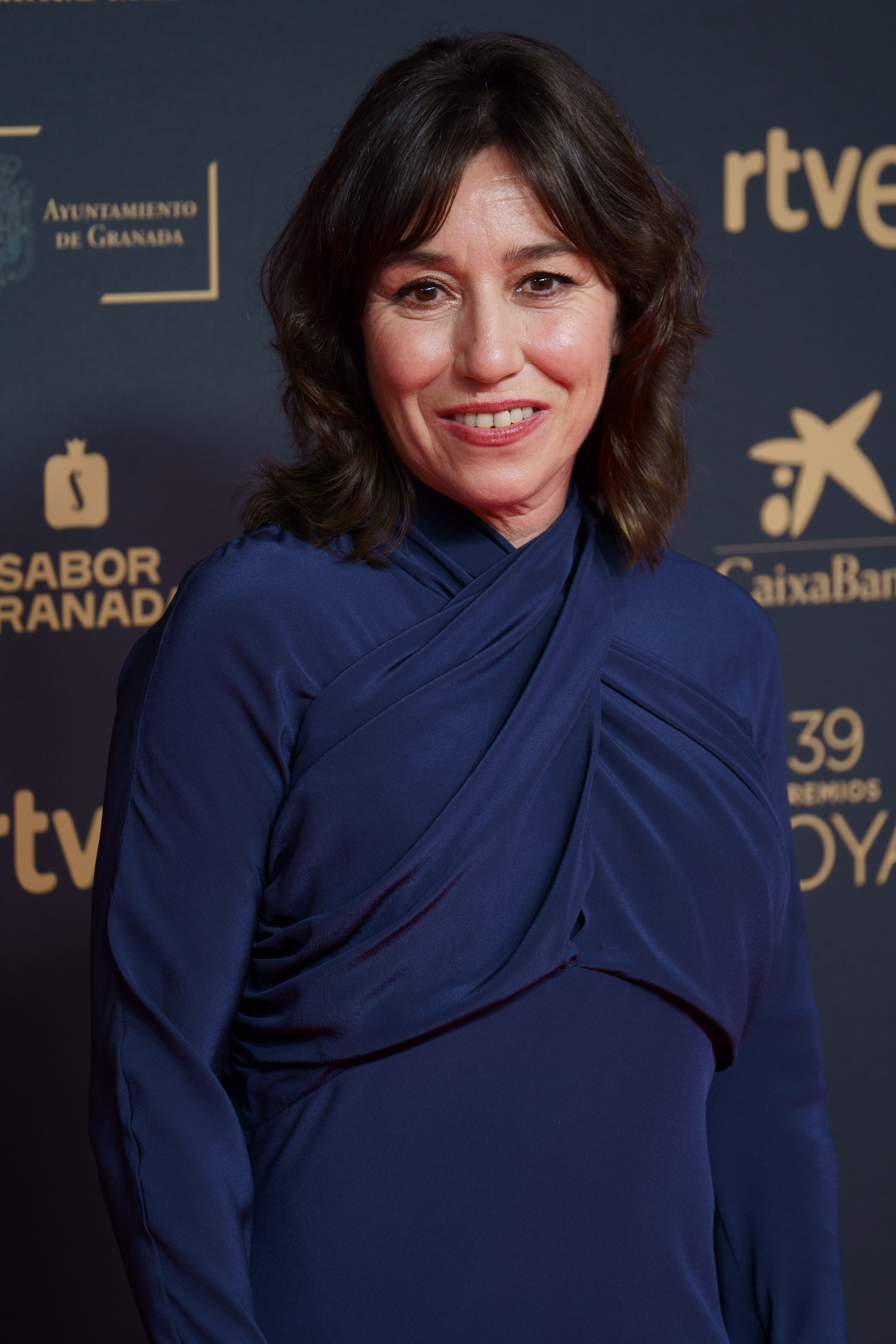
- Dueñas in 2025
- Born: María Dolores Dueñas Navarro; 6 October 1971 (age 55); Madrid, Spain
- Occupation: Actress
- Father: Nicolás Dueñas

María Dolores Dueñas Navarro (born 6 October 1971), better known as Lola Dueñas, is a Spanish actress. She is the recipient of several accolades, including two Goya Awards for Best Actress. In addition to her contributions to Spanish cinema and television, she has also worked in the French film industry.

== Early life and education ==
María Dolores Dueñas Navarro was born in Madrid on 6 October 1971, (Note: Wikipedia has wrongfully displayed an inaccurate birthplace in Barcelona, which was propagated afterwards by other publications.) to Nicolás Dueñas (an actor) and María Navarro (the longtime manager and confidant of Isabel Pantoja). Her great-grandfather was El Rubio de Telde, a noted Canarian wrestler. She trained at the Teatro de La Abadía.

== Acting career ==
Dueñas made her feature film debut in Mensaka (1998), which earned her an Actors Union Award for Best New Performance. She gained early recognition to a television audience for her performance in police drama series Policías, en el corazón de la calle. She then featured in films such as The Sea Inside (2003), Volver (2006), and Me Too (2009). She decided to relocate to Paris, France, in 2011.

In 2012, she joined the sitcom Aída for a three-episode arc to portray the flighty ex of Chema (Pepe Viyuela) and mother of Fidel (Eduardo Casanova).

For her leading performance as a recently widowed woman opposite Anna Castillo in the mother-daughter drama Journey to a Mother's Room (2018), she earned a Goya Award nomination and a Gaudí Award.

After France, she lived for several years in a country house in Dois Portos (Portugal) and, in 2023, she relocated to the Canary Islands, settling in La Palma.

== Filmography ==
=== Feature film ===
Year	Title	Role	Notes	Ref.
1998	Mensaka, páginas de una historia (Mensaka)	Cristina	Feature film debut	
1999	Marta y alrededores (Marta and Surroundings)	Elisa		
2000	Las razones de mis amigos (Friends Have Reasons)	Ainhoa		
2000	Terca vida (Miserable Life)	Esther		
2001	Todo me pasa a mí (Everything Happens to Me)	Txell		
2002	Piedras (Stones)	Daniela		
2002	Hable con ella (Talk to Her)	Matilde		
2003	Días de fútbol (Football Days)	Macarena		
2004	Mar adentro (The Sea Inside)	Rosa		
2005	20 centímetros (20 Centimeters)	Rebeca		
2006	Volver	Sole		
2006	Lo que sé de Lola (Lola)	Lola		
2008	Fuera de carta (Chef's Special)	Alex		
2009	Los abrazos rotos (Broken Embraces)	Lectora de labios ('lip reader')		
2009	Yo, también (Me, Too)	Laura		
2010	Angèle et Tony (Angel & Tony)	Anabel		
2010	Les femmes du 6e étage (The Women on the 6th Floor)	Carmen		
2010	Sin ella (Without Her)	Carmen		
2013	Los amantes pasajeros (I'm So Excited)	Bruna		
2013	10.000 noches en ninguna parte (10,000 Nights Nowhere)	The 'friend'		
2013	Suzanne	Irène		
2013	La Pièce manquante	Paula		
2014	Alleluia	Gloria		
2014	Os fenómenos (Aces)	Neneta		
2014	Stella cadente (Falling Star)	Cocinera ('kitchener')		
2014	Tiens-toi droite	Marguerite		
2015	Les Ogres (Ogres)	Lola		
2015	Incidencias (Stranded)	Nuria		
2015	La Fille du patron (The Boss's Daughter)	Virginia		
2017	No sé decir adiós (Can't Say Goodbye)	Blanca		
2017	Zama	Lucía Piñares de Luenga		
2018	Il se passe quelque chose (Something Is Happening)	Dolores		
2018	Viaje al cuarto de una madre (Journey to a Mother's Room)	Estrella		
2019	Love Me Not	Herodías		
2023	Bird Box Barcelona	Isabel		
2023	Sobre todo de noche (Foremost by Night)	Vera		
2026	La bola negra	Teresa		

=== Television ===
- Policías, en el corazón de la calle

Key
†	Denotes television productions that have not yet been released

Year	Title	Role	Notes	Ref.
2012	Aída	Marisa		
2019	Instinto	Laura		
2020	Veneno	Faela Sainz		
2023	La Mesías	Montserrat		
TBD	Un perfecto extraño †			

== Awards and nominations ==
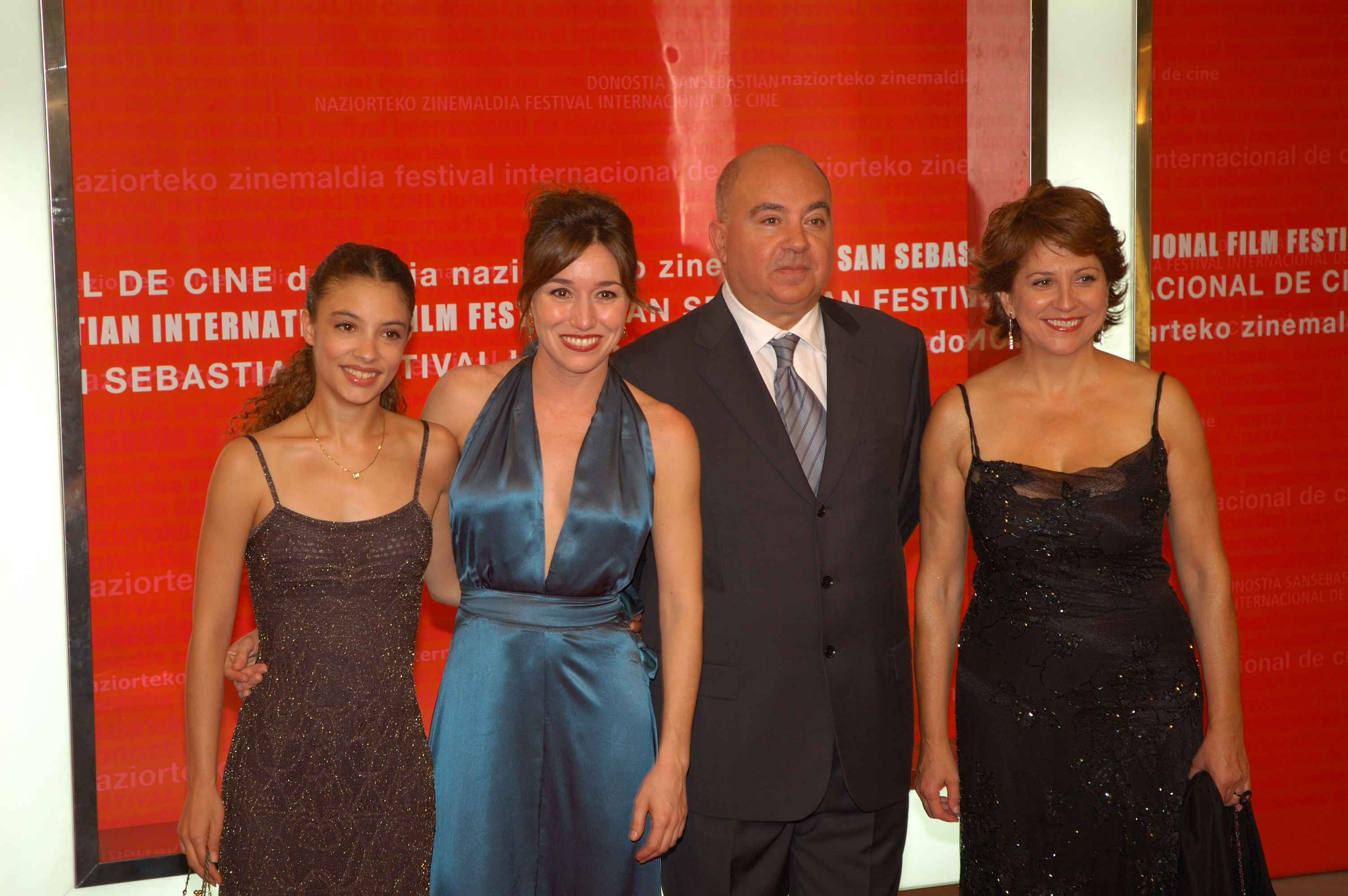
Dueñas attending the San Sebastián International Film Festival along with Yohana Cobo, Agustín Almodóvar, and Esther García in 2006.

Year	Award	Category	Work	Result	Ref.
1999	8th Actors Union Awards	Best New Performance	Mensaka	Won	
2005	19th Goya Awards	Best Actress	The Sea Inside	Won	
2006	59th Cannes Film Festival	Best Actress	Volver	Won	
2007	21st Goya Awards	Best Supporting Actress	Volver	Nominated	
2007	16th Actors and Actresses Union Awards	Best Film Actress in a Secondary Role	Volver	Nominated	
2009	57th San Sebastián International Film Festival	Silver Shell for Best Actress	Me, Too	Won	
2010	24th Goya Awards	Best Actress	Me, Too	Won	
2010	19th Actors and Actresses Union Awards	Best Film Actress in a Leading Role	Me, Too	Won	
2010	19th Actors and Actresses Union Awards	Best Film Actress in a Minor Role	Broken Embraces	Nominated	
2014	23rd Actors and Actresses Union Awards	Best Film Actress in a Secondary Role	10,000 Nights Nowhere	Nominated	
2018	5th Feroz Awards	Best Supporting Actress	Can't Say Goodbye	Nominated	
2018	32nd Goya Awards	Best Supporting Actress	Can't Say Goodbye	Nominated	
2019	6th Feroz Awards	Best Actress	Journey to a Mother's Room	Nominated	
2019	11th Gaudí Awards	Best Actress	Journey to a Mother's Room	Won	
2019	74th CEC Awards	Best Actress	Journey to a Mother's Room	Won	
2019	33rd Goya Awards	Best Actress	Journey to a Mother's Room	Nominated	
2023	29th Forqué Awards	Best Television Actress	La mesías	Won	
2024	11th Feroz Awards	Best Main Actress in a Series	La mesías	Won	
2024	32nd Actors and Actresses Union Awards	Best Television Actress in a Leading Role	La mesías	Won	
2024	11th Platino Awards	Best Actress in a Miniseries or TV series	La mesías	Won	
2026	32nd Forqué Awards	Best Actress in a Film	La bola negra	Pending	
