= Spanish Movie =

- Theatrical release poster
- Directed by: Javier Ruiz Caldera
- Written by: Paco Cabezas
- Produced by: Alvaro Augustín; Eneko Lizarraga; Francisco Sánchez Ortiz; Javier Méndez
- Starring: Joaquín Reyes; Alexandra Jiménez; Silvia Abril; Carlos Areces; Leslie Nielsen
- Music by: Fernando Velázquez
- Production companies: Telecinco Cinema; Think Studio
- Distributed by: Hispano Foxfilm (released through 20th Century Fox)
- Release date: 4 December 2009
- Running time: 85 minutes
- Country: Spain
- Language: Spanish
- Budget: $4.2 million
- Box office: $11.1 million

Spanish Movie is a 2009 Spanish parody film directed by Javier Ruiz Caldera and written by Paco Cabezas. The film was conceived as a Spanish version of the spoof films that were appearing at the time, continuing the trend begun by the Scary Movie franchise.

The production parodies several successful Spanish horror/drama films including: The Others, The Orphanage, Alatriste, Open Your Eyes, Mondays in the Sun, Volver, The Sea Inside, Pan's Labyrinth and REC. It features a cameo by Leslie Nielsen in his last theatrical film appearance.

Production started on 23 February 2009 in Barcelona and the film was released in cinemas on 4 December of that year.

== Plot ==
Ramira (Alexandra Jiménez) works as maid and nanny to Laura (Silvia Abril) and her children: Simeón and Ofendia (Óscar Lara and Laia Alda). Unfortunately, Ramira kills the boy, who suffers from photodermatitis, within minutes of meeting him, when she insists he goes out and gets some sun.

Ramira tries to hide her crime and lies to Laura about Simeón's death. She then meets Laura's brother Pedro San Antón, who is paraplegic like Ramón Sampedro (or at least claims to be).

The house is full of supernatural visitors, including a Fairy (Michelle Jenner) and a Faun (Joaquín Reyes), most of which fall foul of the psychotic Ofendia. One who escapes Ofendia's attentions is Maligna Escobero, a terrifying woman who suggests Laura should make Simeón wear a sack mask to protect himself from the sun.

Ramira enlists the help of Jose (Joselito), who convinces Laura that he is Simeón, despite the disadvantage of being a middle-aged man. She inadvertently kills her alcoholic unemployed husband Antonio and declares her love for Pedro.

Laura becomes suspicious that something is wrong when Simeón does not appear even on his birthday, and pursues a figure wearing a sack mask through the house.

When she hears the figures tell-tale party horn, she runs out to find him in the woods outside her house, only to find her long-lost husband Diego (Eduardo Gómez). After a brief but sexually active reunion, Diego leaves her again.

Pedro insists that he cannot leave his sister until he knows the truth about Simeón. Ramira returns to her village to seek the help of a local mystic. They arrive just in time to see Maligna Escobero die in a fatal accident, as not even Doctor Nielsen (Leslie Nielsen) is able to save her.

With local medium Gerarda unable to help them, the gang return home. Pedro opts to end his life, but the process is complicated by the difficult director he finds to make his goodbye video.

Ramira rushes to Pedro's bedside after learning he has taken cyanide, and is joined by the Fairy and the Faun. The Faun explains the convoluted reality: Pedro exists in the year 3028 and his current reality is all a dream. He has to choose between staying with Ramira, or throwing himself from the top of a building in order to wake up in the future. He opts to stay with Ramira. When the Faun turns violent, Ramira mesmerises him with a song and pushes him off the building. She runs to embrace him, only to accidentally release the brake on his hospital bed, sending him careering off the building. Pedro, falling through infinity, manages to concentrate and control his dream world. He flies to the top of the building and embraces Ramira.

Meanwhile, Laura is still convinced Simeón is around her, as she finds a trail of phallic toys left around the house. She is eventually visited by the boy in the sack mask, who directs her to a hole in the wall. It turns out to be Ofendia, who leads her to Simeón's mutilated remains. Laura, disconsolate, takes a large handful of pills, only to realise that they are laxatives. She is visited by Pedro, who tells her that if she concentrates, she can make Simeón return. Simeón is revived, and Laura opens the doors of the house, telling him he has nothing to fear. With his mother otherwise engaged in the bathroom, Simeón goes to leave the house with Ramira and Pedro, although not all of him makes it out.

== Cast ==
- Alexandra Jiménez as Ramira
- Silvia Abril as Laura
- Carlos Areces as Pedro
- Joaquín Reyes as Faun
- Eduardo Gómez as Diego
- Michelle Jenner as Fairy
- Laia Alda as Ofendia
- José Jiménez Fernández as Himself
- Belén Rueda as Laura García Rodríguez (reprising her role from The Orphanage)
- Leslie Nielsen as Dr. Nielsen
- Alex de la Iglesia as Thimblerig (Shell game hustler) in Alpedetre de los Almodovares
- Miguel Ángel Jenner as Voice over in Los lunes alcohol (spoof of Los lunes al sol)
- José María del Río as Voice in parody of Movistar commercial
- Alejandro Amenábar as Himself (in parody scene of Open Your Eyes)
- Bastien Maimbourg as Sanchez
- Jaume Balagueró and Paco Plaza as Firefighters
- Leticia Dolera as Ángela Vidal
- Berto Romero as Smurf
- Andreu Buenafuente as David the Gnome
- David Fernández as Police in Alpedrete de los Almodóvares
- Nacho Vidal as Himself in the Porno Wii scene (uncredited)
- Chiquito de la Calzada as Himself (in the end credits)

== See also ==
- List of Spanish films of 2009
