= Stefano Bessoni =

Italian filmmaker (born 1965)

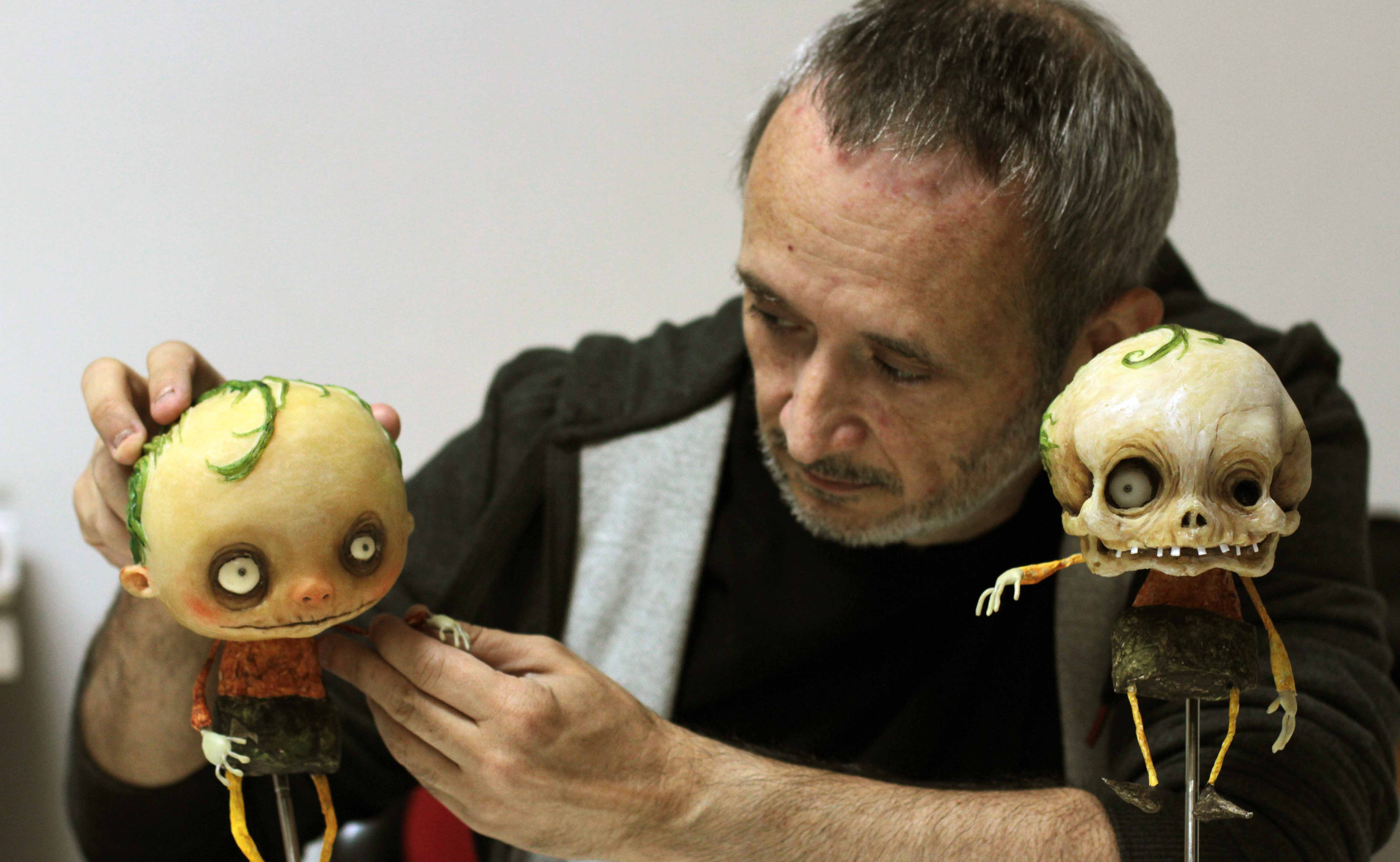
- Stefano Bessoni, Italian filmmaker, illustrator, stop-motion animator working on Gallows Songs (2014)
- Born: 14 September 1965 (age 60); Rome, Italy
- Occupations: Filmmaker, stop-motion animator, illustrator
- Website: http://stefanobessoni.blog.tiscali.it/

Stefano Bessoni (born 14 September 1965) is an Italian filmmaker, stop-motion animator and illustrator.

== Life and career ==
Bessoni was born in Rome in 1965. He studied visual arts under the teaching of the Neapolitan engraver Mario Scarpati. After a detour in zoology and natural sciences, he left the Faculty of Biology and later graduated at the Academy of Fine Arts in Rome.

Since 1989 he has made many experimental films, video and theatre installations and documentary films. In the 1990s he worked for many TV production companies as camera operator, cinematographer and film editor. From 1998 to 2001 he collaborated with the Italian director Pupi Avati as assistant, storyboard artist and digital effect artist.

In 1995, he was awarded the "Claudio Pastori" Prize by the Italian FEDIC, for his work as a filmmaker, "for the consistency of his commitment, the peculiarity of his research, the culture and the passion expressed through his work and in the in-depth analysis of the relationships between cinema, painting, history, and popular traditions and beliefs."

Bessoni is also active as a teacher, both in Italy and abroad. From 2000 to 2007 he taught direction at the NUCT (Roma Film Academy) in Cinecittà, Rome. From 2010 to 2013 he held lectures at the Griffith Academy in Rome.

He has held many workshops on illustration and stop-motion animation at schools and festivals including Ars in Fabula (Macerata, Italy), Giffoni Film Festival (Salerno, Italy), Future Film Festival (Bologna, Italy), Bologna Children's Book Fair – Expopixel (Bologna, Italy), Fantaspoa (Porto Alegre, Brazil), and Estación Diseño (Granada, Spain).

The 2014 book Stop-motion. La fabbrica delle meraviglie (Stop Motion. The Marvel Factory,), with a preface by Barry J.C. Purves was born out of his long-time experience as a teacher and as a stop-motion animator.

"Enchanted by the imaginary dimension of fairy tales" and "fascinated by anything gruesome and disturbing, ominous or deadly", he has also published many illustrated books inspired by the world of Wunderkammer, old fairy tales and macabre rhymes, among which are Homunculus (2011), Wunderkammer (2011), Alice Underground (2012), Gallows Songs (2013) and Pinocchio (2014).

He currently coordinates the undergraduate course in Illustration and Animation at the IED in Rome.

== Filmography ==
Feature films

- 2011 Krokodyle
- 2009 Imago Mortis
- 2005 Frammenti di scienze inesatte
- 2001 The Knights of the Quest (directed by Pupi Avati) (storyboard artist)
- 1999 Midsummer Night's Dance (directed by Pupi Avati) (sketch artist)

Medium-length films, short films, documentaries

- 2013 Gallows Songs
- 2002 Kokocinski
- 2000 Il catturatore
- 1998 Galgenlieder. Canti patibolari
- 1997 Pinocchio apocrifo. Storia di un burattino in dieci quadri
- 1996 Asterione
- 1995 Grimm e il teatro della crudeltà
- 1994 Totentanz
- 1993 Gregor Samsa
- 1993 Tulp
- 1992 Il principe delle ombre. Ritratto di Mario Scarpati
- 1991 La favola del bambino mai nato

== Bibliography ==
- Homunculus, Modena: #logosedizioni (2011)
- Wunderkammer, Modena: #logosedizioni (2011)
- Alice Under Ground, Modena: #logosedizioni (2012)
- Gallows Songs, Modena: #logosedizioni (2013)
- Pinocchio, Modena: #logosedizioni (2014)
- Oz, Modena: #logosedizioni (2016)
- Mr Punch, Modena: #logosedizioni (2015)
- Stop-motion, The Marvel Factory, Modena: #logosedizioni (2015)
- Stop-motion Workshop. First Level, Modena: #logosedizioni (2016)
- Stop-motion Workshop. Second Level: The Puppet, Modena: #logosedizioni (2016)
- Rachel, Series Le scienze inesatte, Modena: #logosedizioni (2017)
- Rebecca, Series Le scienze inesatte, Modena: #logosedizioni (2018)
- Giona, Series Le scienze inesatte, Modena: #logosedizioni (2018)
- SPOON – 27 giorni da bombo (written by Varla Del Rio), Roma: Bakemono Lab (2018)
- Theo, Series Le scienze inesatte, Modena: #logosedizioni (2019)
- Lombroso, Modena: #logosedizioni (2019)
- Darwin, Modena: #logosedizioni (2020)
- Memorie di un boia che amava i fiori (written by Nicola Lucci), Roma: Bakemono Lab (2020)
- Alice Sotto Terra. White Rabbit Edition, Modena: #logosedizioni (2021)
- Struwwelpeter. La vera storia di Pierino Porcospino, Modena: #logosedizioni (2022)
- The Tribulations of Tommy Tiptop. LE TRIBOLAZIONI DI TOMMY, Modena: #logosedizioni (2024)

== Awards and recognition ==
- 2013 Gallows Songs: Grant from the Italian Ministry of Cultural Heritage and Activities as a "film of national cultural interest"
- 2011 Krokodyle: Silver Méliès Special Mention at the Sitges – Festival Internacional de Cinema Fantàstic de Catalunya, Spain; Best International Film at the Puerto Rico Horror Fest, Puerto Rico, USA; Best Fantasy Film at the São Paulo CineFantasy, Brazil
- 2006 Imago Mortis: Grant of 500.000 euros for the film's production by the Italian Ministry of Cultural Heritage and Activities as a "film of national cultural interest"
- 2006 Frammenti di scienze inesatte: Best Feature Film at the Fano International Film Festival; Young Jury Award at the Valdarno Cinema Fedic, San Giovanni Valdarno
