= Yo, también =

2009 film

- Directed by: Antonio Naharro, Álvaro Pastor
- Written by: Antonio Naharro, Álvaro Pastor
- Produced by: Manuel Gómez Cardeña
- Starring: Pablo Pineda; Lola Duenas
- Cinematography: Alfonso Postigo
- Edited by: Nino Martínez Sosa
- Music by: Guille Milkyway
- Release date: 16 October 2009
- Running time: 1 hour 43 minutes
- Country: Spain
- Language: Spanish

Yo, también (English: Me, too) is a 2009 Spanish drama film. It shows the life of Daniel with Down syndrome and his friendship with Laura. Daniel's role has been played by Pablo Pineda, who has Down Syndrome in real life.

== Cast ==
- Pablo Pineda as Daniel
- Lola Duenas as Laura Valiente
- Isabel Garcia Lorca as Ma Angeles
- Antonio Naharro as Santi
- Pedro Alvarez-Ossorio as Bernabe

== Accolades ==
Platforms, Year	Winner/Nominee	Category
ASECAN, 2010	Nominee	Best Male Performance – Pablo Pineda
Brussels European Film Festival, 2010	Winner	Best Film
Cinema City, 2010	Winner	Best Actress – Lola Duenas; Best Actor – Pablo Pineda
Cinema Writers Circle Awards, Spain, 2010	Nominee	Best Actress – Lola Duenas
Lecce European Film Festival, 2010	Winner - Audience Award & Special Jury Award	Best Film
Goya Awards, 2010	Winner	Best Lead Actress – Lola Duenas; Best Original Song – Guille Milkyway
José María Forqué Awards, 2010	Winner	Best Actress – Lola Duenas
Nantes Spanish Film Festival, 2010	Winner	Best First Work – Alvaro Pastor & Antonio Naharro
Rotterdam International Film Festival, 2010	Winner of Audience Award	Best Film
San Sebastián International Film Festival, 2009	Winner	Best Actress – Lola Duenas; Best Actor – Pablo Pineda
Spanish Actors Union Awards, 2010	Winner	Lead Performance, Female – Lola Duenas
Sundance Film Festival, 2010	Nominee for Grand Jury Prize	Film

== See also ==
- List of Spanish films of 2009
