= Miranda Bodenhöfer =

Chilean ballet dancer (born 1990)

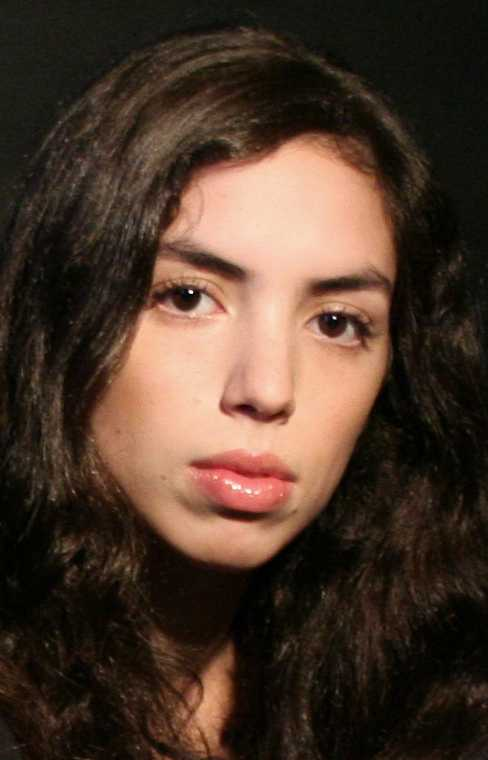
- Born: Miranda Bodenhöfer; May 17, 1990 (age 35); Santiago
- Occupations: Ballet dancer and actress
- Years active: 13
- Known for: The Dancer and the Thief

Miranda Bodenhöfer (born Santiago, Chile on 17 May 1990) is a Chilean ballet dancer and actress, known for her role in the Spanish film The Dancer and the Thief.

== Biography ==
Belonging to an artistic family, Miranda is the daughter of musician Andreas Bodenhöfer and actress Verónica González, and niece of television actor Bastián Bodenhöfer. At the age of 12, she began classes in classical dance and two years later, took classes in the Cuban National Ballet. Later on, she attended other dance schools: the John Cranko school in Stuttgart, Germany and the Houston Ballet's Ben Stevenson Academy in Houston, United States.

Bodenhöfer was 16 years old when Spanish director Fernando Trueba discovered her in a ballet class at the Municipal Theatre of Santiago. Two years later, following auditions with many dancers, Trueba returned to Santiago looking for her to play Victoria in his film The Dancer and the Thief. “Something rather magical happened. When I came to view locations and passed by the Municipal Theatre, among a group of girls studying there I saw a child of about 16 years old. I saw her from afar and thought, ‘that’s Victoria’, but as that seemed silly to me, I forgot about it and we went ahead with casting in a series of countries. In the end, that girl who I had said was Victoria, was indeed ‘my Victoria’”.

== See also ==
- Cinema of Chile
