= Pablo Pineda =

Spanish actor

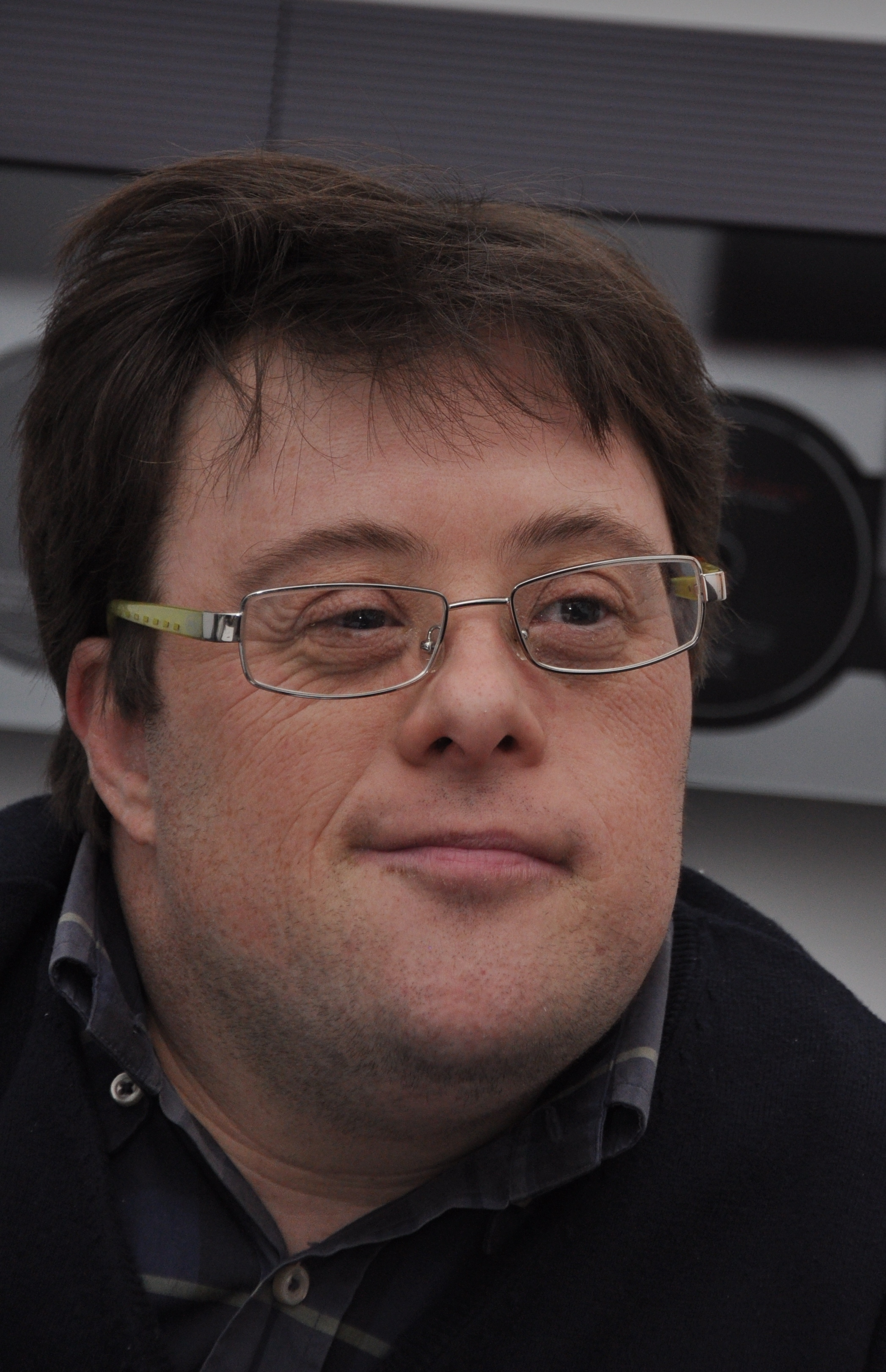
- Born: Pablo Pineda; Málaga, Spain
- Awards: Silver Shell award at 2009 San Sebastián International Film Festival

Pablo Pineda (born 5 August 1974) is a Spanish actor who received the Concha de Plata Award at the 2009 San Sebastián International Film Festival for his performance in the film Yo, también. In the film, he plays the role of a university graduate with Down syndrome, which is quite similar to his real life.

Pineda lives in Málaga and has worked at the municipality. He holds a diploma in Teaching and a BA in educational psychology. He was the first student with Down syndrome in Europe to obtain a university degree. In September 2009, he signalled his intention to forge a career in teaching instead of acting.

Upon his arrival back to Málaga, Francisco de la Torre, the mayor of the city, welcomed him with the "Shield of the City" award on behalf of the city council. At the time he was promoting his film and giving lectures on incapacity and education, as he has been doing for many years.

Pineda currently works with the Adecco Foundation in Spain, giving presentations at conferences on the labour-integration plan that the foundation is carrying out with him.

In 2011, Pablo talked in Colombia (Bogota, Medellin), demonstrating the social inclusion of people with disabilities.

Pineda wrote his first book in 2013, titled El Reto de Aprender ("The Challenge of Learning").

Pineda also collaborates with the "Lo que de verdad importa" Foundation (What Really Matters Foundation).

== See also ==
- Rachel Handlin
