= Broken Embraces =

- Theatrical release poster
- Spanish: Los abrazos rotos
- Directed by: Pedro Almodóvar
- Written by: Pedro Almodóvar
- Produced by: Esther García; Agustín Almodóvar
- Starring: Penélope Cruz; Lluís Homar; Blanca Portillo; José Luis Gómez; Rubén Ochandiano; Tamar Novas
- Cinematography: Rodrigo Prieto
- Edited by: José Salcedo
- Music by: Alberto Iglesias
- Production company: El Deseo
- Distributed by: Warner Bros. Entertainment España
- Release date: 18 March 2009
- Running time: 128 minutes
- Country: Spain
- Languages: Spanish; English
- Budget: $18 million
- Box office: $37.4 million

Broken Embraces (Spanish: Los abrazos rotos) is a 2009 Spanish romantic drama film written, produced, and directed by Pedro Almodóvar. Led by an ensemble cast consisting of many Almodóvar regulars, it stars Lluís Homar as a blind Madrilenian screenwriter who recalls his tragic love for Lena, played by Penélope Cruz, the deceased lead actress in his last directional feature Girls and Suitcases, who was also the mistress of a powerful, obsessive businessman (José Luis Gómez). Blanca Portillo co-stars as his agent Judit, while Tamar Novas portrays her son and Caine's co-writer Diego.

Inspired by darkness and by a photo of a couple that Almodóvar took of El Golfo beach in Lanzarote in the late 1990s, the film serves as an homage to filmmaking, cinema and its various film genres. Stylistically, the film has been described as a hybrid of film noir and melodrama. Thematically, Broken Embraces addresses themes like voyeurism, repression, prostitution, death, vengeance, fixation, illness, and drugs.

Broken Embraces was one of the films competing for the Palme d'Or at the 2009 Cannes Film Festival. Dubbed "purest Almodóvar" by The New Yorker, the film was noted for the director's characteristic "bright primary colors," erotic subject matter, and meticulous, "visually pulsating" cinematography. The picture was nominated for Best Foreign Language Film at both the 2009 British Academy Film Awards and the 67th Golden Globe Awards.

== Plot ==
"Harry Caine" is a blind writer who shares his life with his agent Judit and her adult son, Diego. Slowly, events in the present begin to bring back memories of the past. Harry hears that millionaire Ernesto Martel has died; a young filmmaker, Ray X, appears and turns out to be Martel's son, Ernesto Jr. After Diego is hospitalized for an accidental drug overdose in a Madrid nightclub, Harry collects Diego from the hospital and looks after him to avoid worrying his traveling mother. The main storyline is told in flashback as Harry reluctantly tells Diego a tragic tale of fate, jealousy, abuse of power, betrayal, and guilt.

The first flashback is to 1992, which introduces Magdalena "Lena" Rivero, Martel's beautiful young secretary, an aspiring actress. She becomes close to Martel, a millionaire financier, in order to find the money to help meet her dying father's medical bills. By 1994, she has become Martel's mistress. At this time, Harry is still living under his real name, Mateo Blanco, a well-respected film director. Martel is excessively possessive of Lena, but she is determined to become an actress and manages to win the main role in Blanco's film Chicas y maletas (Girls and Suitcases) by bringing Martel in as financier/producer. Martel spies on Lena and Mateo by sending his inhibited, effeminate gay son, Ernesto Jr., to videotape the production of the film, ostensibly for a "making of" feature, then hiring a lip-reader to interpret the conversations. Martel, seething with jealousy, screens the videos as the lip-reader narrates the furtive whispers of Lena and Mateo's passionate affair.

Furious, Martel confronts Lena, and when she threatens to leave him, he pushes her down the stairs. But when she survives the fall, he relents and nurses her back to health. Lena makes a bargain with Martel agreeing to stay with him provided he allows Mateo to finish shooting the film and decide the final edit. Reluctantly Mateo accepts this arrangement and finishes the shooting, but as soon as this is completed he escapes with Lena to Lanzarote using the name 'Harry Caine' to avoid detection.

Lena takes a job as a hotel receptionist to pass the time. When she and Blanco read in El País that Chicas y maletas has received terrible reviews from critics, likely the end of Blanco's directing career, they decide to start over again together far from Madrid. Fate intervenes when Blanco is seriously injured and Lena is killed in a car accident, which is immortalized by Ernesto Jr., who has been trailing them with his camcorder. Mateo loses his sight permanently. Judit, his long-time production assistant, and an 8-year-old Diego arrive to help Blanco pick up the pieces and return to Madrid, where he eventually writes screenplays in braille under the pseudonym Harry Caine, represented by his agent, Judit.

The story picks up where it began in 2008: Harry shares his birthday in a bar with Judit and Diego. Judit becomes drunk on gin and, stricken with guilt, confesses to Harry that she sold out to Martel in 1994 because of her fury at Harry for abandoning the film to run away with Lena; she also tells him of her involvement in providing Martel the phone number of the hotel in Lanzarote where Lena and Mateo were hiding. She confirms that Martel sabotaged the release of Chicas y maletas by using the worst take from each scene in order to destroy Mateo's reputation. The next morning, she reveals to Diego that Harry is actually his father, a fact both men were unaware of. Having exorcised some of his demons, Harry decides to return to his life as Mateo Blanco. Though believed lost, the original reels of Chicas y maletas and Ernesto Jr.'s camcorder footage are recovered: Judit had ignored Martel's order to destroy them and instead had hidden them away. Mateo and Diego re-edit the film for its long-delayed release as the director envisioned it.

== Cast ==
- Penélope Cruz as Magdalena "Lena" Rivas
- Lluís Homar as Mateo Blanco / Harry Caine
- Blanca Portillo as Judit García
- José Luis Gómez as Ernesto Martel
- Rubén Ochandiano as Ray X / Ernesto Martel Jr.
- Tamar Novas as Diego
- Ángela Molina as Mrs. Rivas
- Chus Lampreave as Portera
- Kiti Mánver as Madame Mylene
- Lola Dueñas as Lectora de labios
- Mariola Fuentes as Edurne
- Carmen Machi as Chon
- Kira Miró as Modelo
- Rossy de Palma as Julieta
- Alejo Sauras as Álex

== Reception ==
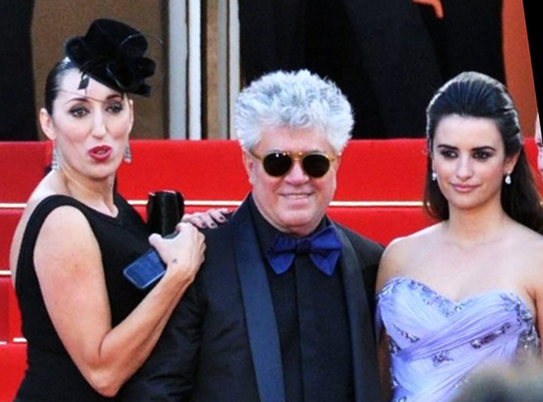
Pedro Almodóvar with actresses Rossy de Palma and Penélope Cruz presenting the film at the 2009 Cannes Film Festival

The film has received generally positive reviews by critics; review aggregator website Rotten Tomatoes reported that 82% of critics gave the film a positive rating, based on 158 reviews. Its consensus states "Pedro Almodóvar's fourth film with Penélope Cruz isn't his finest work, but he brings his signature visual brilliance to this noirish tale, and the cast turns in some first-class performances." It currently holds a score of 76 (generally favorable reviews) on Metacritic. Chicago Sun-Times film critic Roger Ebert gave the film four out of four stars, and wrote that "Broken Embraces is a voluptuary of a film, drunk on primary colors, caressing Penélope Cruz, using the devices of a Hitchcock to distract us with surfaces while the sinister uncoils beneath." The Guardian included the film in its "Top 10 films of 2009" list.

The film was accepted into the main selection at the 2009 Cannes Film Festival in competition for the prestigious Palme d'Or, Almodóvar's third to do so, and fourth to screen at the festival. Broken Embraces was nominated for the 2010 Golden Globe Award for Best Foreign Language Film, Almodóvar's sixth film to be nominated in this category. It was also nominated for the Satellite Award for Best Foreign Language Film, as well as the Satellite Award for Best Actress for Penélope Cruz's performance.

=== Accolades ===
List of awards and nominations
Award	Category	Recipients and nominees	Result
Actors and Actresses Union Awards	Lead Performance, Female	Penélope Cruz	Nominated
Actors and Actresses Union Awards	Lead Performance, Male	Lluís Homar	Nominated
Actors and Actresses Union Awards	Performance in a Minor Role, Female	Lola Dueñas	Nominated
Actors and Actresses Union Awards	Supporting Performance, Female	Blanca Portillo	Nominated
Actors and Actresses Union Awards	Supporting Performance, Male	José Luis Gómez	Nominated
British Academy Film Awards	Best Film Not in the English Language	Agustín Almodóvar; Pedro Almodóvar	Nominated
Cannes Film Festival	Palme d'Or	Pedro Almodóvar	Nominated
Cinema Writers Circle Awards	Best Actress	Penélope Cruz	Nominated
Cinema Writers Circle Awards	Best Cinematography	Rodrigo Prieto	Nominated
Cinema Writers Circle Awards	Best Original Screenplay	Pedro Almodóvar	Nominated
Cinema Writers Circle Awards	Best Supporting Actress	Blanca Portillo	Nominated
Cinema Writers Circle Awards	Best Actress	Penélope Cruz	Nominated
Critics' Choice Movie Awards	Best Foreign Language Film	—N/a	Won
Dallas-Fort Worth Film Critics Association Awards	Best Foreign Language Film	—N/a	Nominated
European Film Awards	Best Actress	Penélope Cruz	Nominated
European Film Awards	Best Composer	Alberto Iglesias	Won
European Film Awards	Best Director	Pedro Almodóvar	Nominated
European Film Awards	People's Choice Award for Best Film	Pedro Almodóvar	Nominated
Golden Globe Awards	Best Foreign Language Film	—N/a	Nominated
Goya Awards	Best Actress	Penélope Cruz	Nominated
Goya Awards	Best Costume Design	Sonia Grande	Nominated
Goya Awards	Best Make-Up and Hairstyles	Massimo Gattabrusi; Ana Lozano	Nominated
Goya Awards	Best Original Score	Alberto Iglesias	Won
Goya Awards	Best Original Screenplay	Pedro Almodóvar	Nominated
Irish Film & Television Awards	Best International Actress	Penélope Cruz	Nominated
New York Film Critics Circle Awards	Best Foreign Language Film	—N/a	Nominated
Online Film Critics Society Awards	Best Foreign Language Film	—N/a	Nominated
Phoenix Film Critics Society Awards	Best Foreign Language Film	—N/a	Won
Satellite Awards	Best Foreign Language Film	—N/a	Won
Satellite Awards	Satellite Award for Best Actress	Penélope Cruz	Nominated
Silver Condor	Best Foreign Film	Pedro Almodóvar	Nominated
São Paulo International Film Festival	Best Foreign-Language Film	Pedro Almodóvar	Won
Vancouver Film Critics Circle Awards	Best Foreign Language Film	—N/a	Nominated
Washington D.C. Area Film Critics Association Awards	Best Foreign Language Film	—N/a	Nominated

== Soundtrack ==
The film includes an original soundtrack album composed entirely by Alberto Iglesias, which was released in Spain on CD format to coincide with the film's release. The film also includes two English tracks from American artists: "Robot Oeuf" by Uffie, and a cover of Michael Hurley's "Werewolf" by Cat Power.

== See also ==
- List of Spanish films of 2009
