= 4th Gaudí Awards =

Film award ceremony organised by the Catalan Film Academy

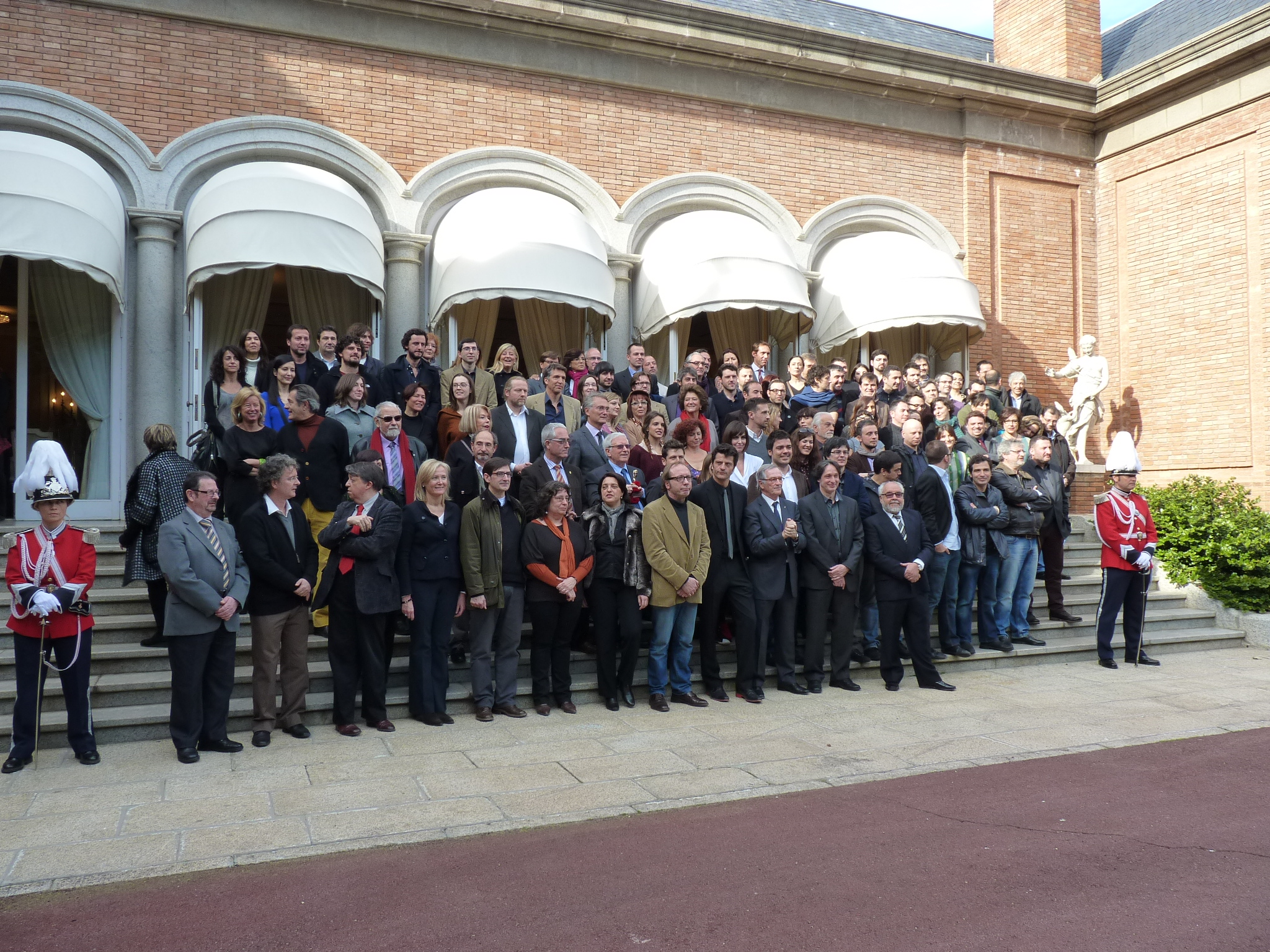
Gaudí Awards, 2012

The 4th Gaudí Awards, overseen by the Catalan Film Academy (Acadèmia del Cinema Català), were presented on 6 February 2012 at the Arteria Theater Paral·lel in Barcelona, Catalonia.

== Winners and nominees ==
Winners are listed first and highlighted in boldface.

**Best Film in Catalan language**: **Eva – Escándalo Films S.L. and Televisió de Catalunya (TVC)**; Bruc, the Manhunt – Televisió de Catalunya (TVC), Mesfilms, and Ikiru Films; Open 24h – Zabriskie Films and Televisió de Catalunya (TVC); Catalunya über alles! – Televisió de Catalunya (TVC), and Segarra Films	**Best Film Not in the Catalan language**: **Sleep Tight – Filmax and Televisió de Catalunya (TVC)**; Katmandú, un espejo en el cielo – Televisió de Catalunya (TVC), and Media Films; The Double Steps – Televisió de Catalunya (TVC), and Tusitala Producciones Cinematográficas S.L.; I Want to Be a Soldier – Canonigo Films
**Best Actor in a Leading Role**: **Luis Tosar –** **Sleep Tight**; Daniel Brühl – Eva; Amadís de Murga – Open 24h; Juan José Ballesta – Bruc, the Manhunt	**Best Actress in a Leading Role**: **Verónica Echegui –** **Katmandú, un espejo en el cielo**; Marta Etura – Sleep Tight; Àstrid Bergès-Frisbey – Bruc, the Manhunt; Claudia Vega – Eva
**Best Supporting Actor**: **Lluís Homar –** **Eva**; Alberto San Juan – Sleep Tight; José María Blanco – Open 24h; Jordi Dauder – Catalunya über alles!	**Best Supporting Actress**: **Vicky Peña** – **Catalunya über alles!**; Anne Canovas – Eva; Belén Fabra – Catalunya über alles!; Judit Uriach – Open 24h
**Best Director**: **Jaume Balagueró –** **Sleep Tight**; Kike Maíllo – Eva; Carles Torras – Open 24h; Javier Mariscal, Tono Errando, Fernando Trueba – Chico and Rita	**Best Screenplay**: **Alberto Marini –** **Sleep Tight**; Ignacio Martínez de Pisón, Fernando Trueba – Chico and Rita; Daniel Faraldo, Ramon Térmens – Catalunya über alles!; Cristina Clemente, Sergi Belbel, Martí Roca, Aintza Serra – Eva
**Best Cinematography**: **Arnau Valls Colomer –** **Eva**; Juan Miguel Azpiroz – Bruc, the Manhunt; Antonio Riestra –Katmandú, un espejo en el cielo; Pablo Rosso – Sleep Tight	**Best Art Direction**: **Laia Colet –** **Eva**; Javier Alvariño – Sleep Tight; Javier Mariscal –Chico and Rita; Antxón Gómez – Bruc, the Manhunt
**Best Costume Design**: **Ariadna Papió –** Bruc, the Manhunt; Pere Abadal – Mil cretins; Maria Gil – Eva; Marian Coromina – Sleep Tight	**Best Sound**: **Oriol Tarragó, Jordi Rossinyol Colomer, David Calleja –** Sleep Tight; Pelayo Gutiérrez, Nacho Royo – Chico and Rita; Oriol Tarragó, Jordi Rossinyol Colomer, Marc Orts – Eva; Xavier Mas, Glenn Freemantle, Mike Dowson – Bruc, the Manhunt
**Best Film Editing**: **Guillermo de la Cal –** Sleep Tight; Marc Soria – Bruc, the Manhunt; Emanuele Tiziani, Sara López – Open 24h; Elena Ruiz – Eva	**Best Special/Visual Effects**: **Lluís Castells, Arturo Balseiro, Javier García –** Eva; Montse Ribé, David Martí, Cesc Biénzobas – Sleep Tight; Félix Bergés, Reyes Abades – Bruc, the Manhunt; David Martinez, Montse Ribé, David Martí, Iván Valero, Bruno López, Oriol Tarrida – Floquet de Neu
**Best Original Score**: **Bebo Valdés** – **Chico and Rita**; Xavier Capellas – Bruc, the Manhunt; Sacha Galperine, Evgueni Galperine – Eva; Lucas Vidal – Sleep Tight	**Best Short Film**: **Ahora no puedo –** **Roser Aguilar (Ahora Puedo Producciones)**; Odysseus' Gambit – Àlex Lora; El barco pirata – Fernando Trullols (Bastian Films); El somriure amagat – Ventura Durall (Nanouk Films)
**Best Documentary**: **Barcelona, abans que el temps ho esborri – Mireia Ros (Promarfi Futuro 2010, Televisió de Catalunya (TVC))**; Al final de la escapada – Albert Solé (Minimal Films, Televisió de Catalunya (TVC)); Enxaneta – Paulí Subirà (Televisió de Catalunya (TVC)); La maleta mexicana – Trisha Ziff (Televisió de Catalunya (TVC), Paco Poch AV, Mallerich Films, Televisión Española (TVE), 212 Berlin)	**Best Make-Up and Hairstyles**: **Caitlin Acheson, Amparo Sánchez** – **Bruc, the Manhunt**; Alma Casal, Satur Merino – Sleep Tight; Anna Merino, Ignasi Ruiz – Mil cretins; Jesús Martos, Concha Rodríguez – Eva
**Best Production Manager**: **Jordi Berenguer, Victòria Borrás – Bruc, the Manhunt**; Carla Pérez de Albéniz, Teresa Gefaell –Sleep Tight; Carlos González de Jesús –Katmandú, un espejo en el cielo; Toni Carrizosa – Eva	**Best European Film**: **The King's Speech – Tom Hooper**; Pina – Wim Wenders; No Rest for the Wicked – Enrique Urbizu; Melancholia – Lars von Trier
**Best Animated Feature**: **Chico and Rita – Fernando Trueba, Tono Errando, Javier Mariscal (Televisió de Catalunya (TVC), Estudio Mariscal, Fernando Trueba Producciones Cinematográficas S.A.)**; Wrinkles – Ignacio Ferreras (Perro Verde Films, Cromosoma TV produccions); Floquet de Neu – Andrés G. Schaer (Filmax, Televisió de Catalunya (TVC), Muf Animation, Utopia Global)	**Best TV-Movie**: **14 d'abril. Macià contra Companys – Manuel Huerga (Minoria Absoluta, TVC)**; Barcelona, ciutat neutral – Sònia Sánchez (Prodigius Cinema, Televisió de Catalunya (TVC)); Ermessenda – Lluís Maria Güell (Ovídeo TV S.A., Televisió de Catalunya (TVC)); Clara Campoamor. La mujer olvidada – Laura Mañá (Televisión Española (TVE), Distinto Films, Televisió de Catalunya (TVC))

== Honorary Gaudí Awards ==
- Pere Portabella
