= 26th Goya Awards =

- Date: 19 February 2012
- Site: Palacio Municipal de Congresos, Madrid
- Hosted by: Eva Hache
- Organized by: Academy of Cinematographic Arts and Sciences of Spain

Highlights
- Best Film: No Rest for the Wicked
- Best Actor: José Coronado; No Rest for the Wicked
- Best Actress: Elena Anaya; The Skin I Live In
- Most awards: No Rest for the Wicked (6)
- Most nominations: The Skin I Live In (16)

Television coverage
- Network: TVE
- Viewership: 4.16 million (23.3%)

The 26th Goya Awards ceremony, presented by the Academy of Cinematographic Arts and Sciences of Spain, took place on 19 February 2012. The gala was hosted by comedian Eva Hache. On 10 January 2012, the nominees were announced. No Rest for the Wicked won six awards, including Best Film, Best Director and Best Actor.

== Winners and nominees ==
The winners and nominees are listed as follows:

Best Film: No Rest for the Wicked; Blackthorn; The Skin I Live In; The Sleeping Voice	Best Director: Enrique Urbizu – No Rest for the Wicked; Pedro Almodóvar – The Skin I Live In; Mateo Gil – Blackthorn; Benito Zambrano – The Sleeping Voice
Best Actor: José Coronado – No Rest for the Wicked; Antonio Banderas – The Skin I Live In; Daniel Brühl – Eva; Luis Tosar – Sleep Tight	Best Actress: Elena Anaya – The Skin I Live In; Inma Cuesta – The Sleeping Voice; Verónica Echegui – Kathmandu Lullaby; Salma Hayek – As Luck Would Have It
Best Supporting Actor: Lluís Homar – Eva; Raúl Arévalo – Cousinhood; Juanjo Artero – No Rest for the Wicked; Juan Diego – 17 Hours	Best Supporting Actress: Ana Wagener – The Sleeping Voice; Pilar López de Ayala – Intruders; Goya Toledo – Maktub; Maribel Verdú – Chrysalis
Best New Actor: Jan Cornet – The Skin I Live In; Marc Clotet – The Sleeping Voice; Adrián Lastra – Cousinhood; José Sánchez Mota – As Luck Would Have It	Best New Actress: María León – The Sleeping Voice; Alba García – Verbo; Michelle Jenner – Don't Be Afraid; Blanca Suárez – The Skin I Live In
Best Original Screenplay: Enrique Urbizu, Michel Gaztambide – No Rest for the Wicked; Miguel Barros – Blackthorn; Martí Roca, Sergi Belbel, Cristina Clemente, Aintza Serra – Eva; Woody Allen – Midnight in Paris	Best Adapted Screenplay: Ángel de la Cruz, Ignacio Ferreras, Paco Roca, Rosanna Cecchini – Wrinkles; Icíar Bollaín – Kathmandu Lullaby; Pedro Almodóvar – The Skin I Live In; Benito Zambrano, Ignacio del Moral – The Sleeping Voice
Best Ibero-American Film: Chinese Take-Away · Argentina; Ticket to Paradise · Cuba; Miss Bala · Mexico; Violeta · Chile	Best European Film: The Artist · France; Jane Eyre · United Kingdom; Melancholia · Denmark; Carnage · France
Best New Director: Kike Maíllo – Eva; Paco Arango – Maktub; Eduardo Chapero-Jackson – Verbo; Paula Ortiz – Chrysalis	Best Animated Film: Wrinkles; Cartago Nova; Daddy, I'm a Zombie; The Little Wizard
Best Cinematography: Juan Antonio Ruiz Anchía – Blackthorn; Arnau Valls Colomer – Eva; José Luis Alcaine – The Skin I Live In; Unax Mendia – No Rest for the Wicked	Best Editing: Pablo Blanco – No Rest for the Wicked; David Gallart – Blackthorn; Elena Ruiz – Eva; José Salcedo – The Skin I Live In
Best Art Direction: Juan Pedro de Gaspar – Blackthorn; Laia Colet – Eva; Antxón Gómez – The Skin I Live In; Antón Laguna – No Rest for the Wicked	Best Production Supervision: Andrés Santana – Blackthorn; Toni Carrizosa – Eva; Toni Novella – The Skin I Live In; Paloma Molina – No Rest for the Wicked
Best Sound: Marcos de Oliveira, Nacho Royo-Villanova – No Rest for the Wicked; Daniel Fontrodona, Marc Orts, Fabiola Ordoyo – Blackthorn; Jordi Rossinyol, Oriol Tarragó, Marc Orts – Eva; Iván Marín, Marc Orts, Pelayo Gutiérrez – The Skin I Live In	Best Special Effects: Arturo Balseiro, Lluís Castells – Eva; Raúl Romanillos, David Heras – Intruders; Reyes Abades, Eduardo Díaz – The Skin I Live In; Raúl Romanillos, Chema Remacha – No Rest for the Wicked
Best Costume Design: Clara Bilbao – Blackthorn; Paco Delgado – The Skin I Live In; María José Iglesias García – The Sleeping Voice; Patricia Monné – No Rest for the Wicked	Best Makeup and Hairstyles: Karmele Soler, David Martí, Manolo Carretero – The Skin I Live In; Ana López-Puigcerver, Belén López-Puigcerver – Blackthorn; Concha Rodríguez, Jesús Martos – Eva; Montse Boqueras, Nacho Díaz, Sergio Pérez – No Rest for the Wicked
Best Original Score: Alberto Iglesias – The Skin I Live In; Lucio Godoy – Blackthorn; Evgueni Galperine, Sacha Galperine – Eva; Mario de Benito – No Rest for the Wicked	Best Original Song: "Nana de la hierbabuena" by Carmen Agredano – The Sleeping Voice; "Debajo del limón" by Paul Ortiz and Pachi García 'Alis' – Chrysalis; "Nuestra playa eres tú" by Jorge Pérez Quintero, Borja Jiménez Mérida and Patricio Marín Díaz – Maktub; "Verbo" by Pascal Gaigne and Ignacio Fornés – Verbo
Best Fictional Short Film: El barco pirata; El premio; Matar a un niño; Meine Liebe	Best Animated Short Film: Birdboy; Ella; Zeinek gehiago iraun; Rosa
Best Documentary Film: Escuchando al juez Garzón; 30 años de oscuridad; El cuaderno de barro; Morente. El barbero de Picasso	Best Documentary Short Film: Regreso a Viridiana; Alma; Nuevos tiempos; Virgen negra

== Honorary Goya ==
- Josefina Molina
