= Oriol Tarragó =

Spanish sound designer

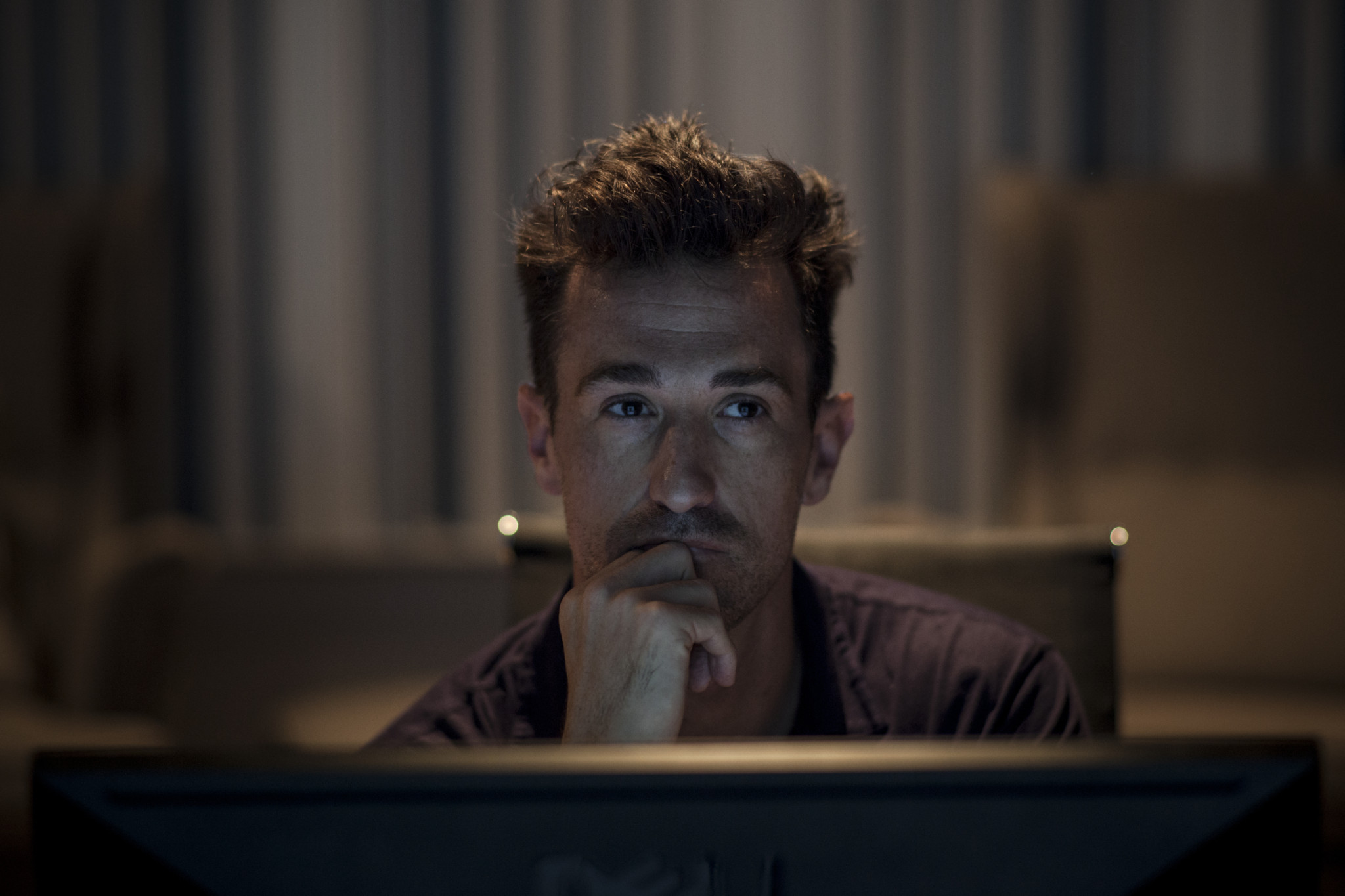
- Oriol Tarragó
- Born: Reus, Tarragona, Spain
- Occupations: Sound designer and Sound post-production supervisor
- Website: orioltarrago.com

Oriol Tarragó (Reus, Tarragona), is a film post-production supervisor and sound designer. He is also a teacher at the Escuela Superior de Cine y Audiovisuales de Cataluña (ESCAC), attached to the University of Barcelona.

He has designed the sound design of many Spanish and international films such as [REC], The Orphanage (2007), The Impossible (2012), Enemy (2013) Crimson Peak (2015), Penny Dreadful (2014), A Monster Call (2018), Jurassic World: Fallen Kingdom(2018) and Society of the snow (2023). He won six Goya Awards from the Spanish Film Academy, eight Gaudí Award from the Catalan Film Academy and two Golden Reel Awards from the Motion Sound Picture Editors. In 2018 he was awarded Best European Sound Designer by the European Film Academy.

He is a member of the Spanish Film Academy and the Academy of Motion Picture Arts and Sciences.

== Biography ==
He graduated from the Escola Superior de Cinema i Audiovisuals de Catalunya - (Cinema and Audivisuals School of Catalonia), with the documentary Pura (1999) after receiving a scholarship for a six-month stay at the Singapore`s Ngee Ann Polytechnic.

== Career ==
Upon his return from Singapore, he worked with Guillermo del Toro on The Devil’s Backbone (2001) and with fellow graduate from Escola Superior de Cinema, Juan Antonio Bayona on Bayona´s first short films.

He then moved to New York, where he studied film postproduction at New York University (NYU), and on to London to work as a sound editor.

He returned to Barcelona to do The Orphanage (2007) with Bayona and began to work for directors such as Jaume Balagueró, Kike Maíllo, Denis Villeneuve or Daniel Monzón, Edmón Roch, as well as for Juan Antonio Bayona’s subsequent films.

He currently works from his studio Coser y Cantar in central Barcelona and is teaching sound design at Escola Superior de Cinema Film School. He is also involved in several projects with studios in San Francisco, Toronto and London.

== Filmography (selection) ==
Sound Department
Year	Movies
2025	Wolfgang (Extraordinari)
2025	Un fantasma en la batalla
2025	Deep water
2024	L`homme au piano
2024	Dos tumbas (3 Episodios)
2024	La Joia: Bad Gyal
2024	The Penguin Lessons
2024	Buffalo Kids
2024	Casa en flames
2024	A través de tu mirada
2023	Això no és Suècia (8 Episodes)
2023	El último día
2023	Society of the Snow
2023	Bird Box: Barcelona
2023	A través del mar
2023	Fauna
2023	Mummies
2022	A man of action
2022	El Crédito
2022	Tad, the Lost Explorer and the Emerald Tablet
2022	A través de mi ventana
2022	Feria: La luz más oscura (TV Series)
2021	Tres
2021	L'homme au piano
2021	Las leyes de la frontera
2021	Xtremo
2021	Way Down
2020	Cosmética del enemigo
2019	Malnazidos
2019	Hogar
2019	4×4
2019	Premios Goya 33 edición
2018	Paradise Hills
2018	La Noria
2018	Superlópez
2018	Yucatán
2018	Jurassic World: Fallen Kingdom
2018	Another Day of Life
2017	Marrowbone
2017	Tadeo Jones 2: El Secreto del Rey Midas
2016	Don't Blame the Karma for Being an Idiot
2016	The Invisible Guest
2016	A Monster calls
2015	Crimson Peak
2015	Capture the flag
2015	[REC] 4: Apocalypse
2014	El Niño
2014	Out of the Dark
2013	The Innocents
2013	Enemy
2013	Mamá
2012	The Body
2012	The Impossible
2011	Mientras duermes
2011	Eva
2010	The Julia's Eyes
2009	Spanish Movie
2009	[Rec]²
2007	Fermat's Room
2007	[Rec]
2007	The Orphanage
2006	Moscow zero
2005	The Nun
2004	Whore
2003	Beyond Re-Animator
2001	Stranded
2001	The Devil's Backbone

== Awards and nominations == 27 Awards and 17 nominations
Year	Award	Category	Result	Work
2022	International Cinephile Society Awards	Award - Best Sound	2º Place	Tres
2022	Mestre Mateo Awards	Award - Best Sound	Winner	Tres
2020	SITGES International Fantastic Film Festival of Catalonia	Honorary Maria Award for a lifetime career in sound design	Winner	
2020	Madrid Film Festival-PNR	Award - Best Sound	Winner	El Infierno
2019	Fugaz Awards	Award - Best Sound	Nominated	La Noria
2018	Cortogenia	Best Sound Award	Winner	La Noria
2018	Emile Awards	Award for Best Sound Design in a Feature Film Production.	Nominated	Another day of life
2024	Latino Entertainment Journalists Association Film Awards (LEJA Awards)	Best Sound Award	Nominated	Society of the Snow
2024	Motion Picture Sound Editors	Golden Reel Award for Outstanding Achievement in Sound Editing - Foreign Language Feature Film	Winner	Society of the Snow
2020	Motion Picture Sound Editors	Outstanding Achievement in Sound Editing - Sound Effects, Foley, Music, Dialogue and ADR for live-action broadcast media under 35 minutes	Nominated	Battle at Big Rock
2015	Motion Picture Sound Editors	Golden Reel Award - Best Sound Montage, Best Sound Effects, Best Room Effects on television	Nominated	Chapter: «Penny Dreadful: Night Work»
2008	Motion Picture Sound Editors	Golden Reel Award - Best Sound Montage, Best Room Effects, Best Editing of Dialogues in a non-English speaking film	Winner	The Orphanage
2017	European Film	European Sound Design Award	Winner	A Monster Call
2024	Goya	Goya Award - Best Sound	Winner	Society of the Snow
2022	Goya	Goya Award - Best Sound	Winner	Tres
2017	Goya	Goya Award - Best Sound	Winner	A Monster Call
2016	Goya	Goya Award - Best Sound	Nominated	Anacleto, agente secreto
2015	Goya	Goya Award - Best Sound	Winner	El Niño
2013	Goya	Goya Award - Best Sound	Winner	The Impossible
2012	Goya	Goya Award - Best Sound	Nominated	Eva
2008	Goya	Goya Award - Best Sound	Winner	The Orphanage
2024	CinEuphoria	Best Sound / Sound effects in international competition	Winner	Society of the Snow
2014	CinEuphoria	Best Special Effects (sound or visual) in International Competition	Winner	The Impossible
2024	Platino	Award - Best Sound Direction	Winner	Society of the Snow
2017	Platino	Award - Best Sound Direction	Winner	A Monster Call
2024	International Online Cinema Awards (INOCA)	Best Sound Award	Nominated	Society of the Snow
2022	The Catalan Film Academy	Gaudí Award - Best Sound	Nominated	Las Leyes de la frontera
2022	The Catalan Film Academy	Gaudí Award - Best Sound	Nominated	Tres
2019	The Catalan Film Academy	Gaudí Award - Best Sound	Nominated	Jurassic World
2019	The Catalan Film Academy	Gaudí Award - Best Sound	Nominated	Super López
2017	The Catalan Film Academy	Gaudí Award - Best Sound	Winner	A Monster Call
2016	The Catalan Film Academy	Gaudí Award - Best Sound	Winner	Anacleto, agente secreto
2016	The Catalan Film Academy	Gaudí Award - Best Sound	Winner	Capture the flag
2015	The Catalan Film Academy	Gaudí Award - Best Sound	Winner	El Niño
2014	The Catalan Film Academy	Gaudí Award - Best Sound	Nominated	[REC] 4: Apocalypse
2014	The Catalan Film Academy	Gaudí Award - Best Sound	Winner	Los últimos días
2014	The Catalan Film Academy	Gaudí Award - Best Sound	Nominated	El cuerpo
2013	The Catalan Film Academy	Gaudí Award - Best Sound	Winner	The Impossible
2012	The Catalan Film Academy	Gaudí Award - Best Sound	Winner	Mientras duermes
2012	The Catalan Film Academy	Gaudí Award - Best Sound	Nominated	Eva
2011	The Catalan Film Academy	Gaudí Award - Best Sound	Nominated	The Julia's Eyes
2010	The Catalan Film Academy	Gaudí Award - Best Sound	Winner	[Rec]²
2007	Barcelona	Barcelona Award - Best Sound	Winner	The Orphanage
2017	Fenix	Award - Best Sound	Winner	A Monster Call
2019	Fugaz Spanish Short Film Awards	Best Sound award	Nominated	La Noria
