= Roser Aguilar =

Spanish film director and screenwriter

- Born: 1971 (age 54–55); Barcelona, Spain
- Education: Cinema and Audiovisual School of Catalonia
- Occupations: Film director, screenwriter
- Notable work: Lo mejor de mí
- Awards: Critical Eye Award (2008); Sant Jordi Award (2008)
- Website: www.roseraguilar.com

Roser Aguilar (born 1971) is a Spanish film director and screenwriter.

== Biography ==
Roser Aguilar earned a licentiate in journalism from the Autonomous University of Barcelona and a degree in film direction from the Cinema and Audiovisual School of Catalonia (ESCAC), as part of the school's first graduating class. She specialized in management, and completed her studies with courses in screenwriting from Fernando Trueba and Joaquim Jordà, directing from Bob McAndrew and Juan José Campanella, and photography from Manuel Laguillo, Antonio Corral, and Pepe Baeza.

In 2008 she received the Critical Eye Award for Cinema from Radio Nacional de España, the City of Barcelona Award for Audiovisuals, and the Sant Jordi Award for Best New Director for her film Lo mejor de mí. Produced by Escándalo Films (linked to ESCAC) and starring Marian Álvarez, Juan Sanz, Lluís Homar, Alberto Jiménez, Marieta Orozco, and Carmen Machi, the film gained Aguilar widespread recognition in Spain. It also received multiple international awards, including the 2007 Silver Leopard (award for the best performer) for Marian Álvarez, and was nominated for the Golden Leopard for best director at the Locarno Festival, where it also won Boccalino D'Oro for Best Film of the festival, according to the Independent Review. At the Schermi d'amore festival it won the public award, the critics' award, and the special jury award, and at the Latin Film Festival it received the public award in Tuebingen and Stuttgart, Germany.

In 2011, she directed Ahora no puedo, which won Best Short Film at the Gaudí Awards.

In 2017, Aguilar released Brava, a film starring Laia Marull which explores the feeling of loneliness, misunderstanding, and shame that torments victims of sexual violence after the aggression is reported. She began writing its script in 2009. It was presented in March at the Málaga Film Festival and reached theaters in July 2017.

== Filmography ==
=== Director ===
- 1997 – El llimoner, short
- 1999 – Cuando te encontré, short
- 2007 – Lo mejor de mí, feature
- 2008 – Mapa'08 Fosc, documentary
- 2009 – Clara no lo esperaba, short
- 2011 – Ahora no puedo, short
- 2017 – Brava, feature

=== Screenwriter ===
- 1997 – El llimoner, short
- 1999 – Cuando te encontré, short
- 2003 – Tarasca, TV
- 2005 – Idéntics, TV
- 2007 – Lo mejor de mí, feature
- 2009 – Clara no lo esperaba, short
- 2016 – Brava, feature

=== Assistant director ===
- 1997 – En brazos de la mujer madura
- 1999 – Discotheque
- 2000 – Una bella inquietud

=== Actress ===
- Cinemacat.cat by Antoni Verdaguer
