= No Rest for the Wicked (2011 film) =

- Theatrical release poster
- Spanish: No habrá paz para los malvados
- Directed by: Enrique Urbizu
- Written by: Enrique Urbizu; Michel Gaztambide
- Produced by: Álvaro Augustín; Gonzalo Salazar-Simpson
- Starring: José Coronado; Juanjo Artero; Helena Miquel
- Cinematography: Unax Mendía
- Edited by: Pablo Blanco
- Music by: Mario de Benito
- Production companies: Telecinco Cinema; Lazona Films; Manto Films
- Distributed by: Warner Bros. Pictures
- Release dates: 17 September 2011 (Zinemaldia); 23 September 2011 (Spain)
- Country: Spain
- Language: Spanish
- Box office: €4.5 million

No Rest for the Wicked (Spanish: No habrá paz para los malvados) is a 2011 Spanish neo-noir thriller film directed by Enrique Urbizu, written by Urbizu and Michel Gaztambide and starring José Coronado, Juanjo Artero, and Helena Miquel.

The film won six Goya Awards, including Best Picture, Director, Original Screenplay, and Leading Actor (Coronado).

== Plot ==
Santos Trinidad, a corrupt policeman and disgraced former GEO member, goes binge drinking late at night. He is thrown out of a bar and aggressively demands a drink from a waitress in another bar despite the fact that they are closed. The manager attempts to defuse the situation by offering Trinidad a free drink, but his physical proximity is deemed too invasive by Trinidad, whose training and instincts suddenly rouse him from his drunken stupor; he breaks the manager's nose, the bouncer draws a pistol, and Trinidad shoots both of them dead. As Trinidad cleans up the evidence, an eyewitness escapes. After Trinidad studies their wallets for clues on the identity of the eyewitness, he destroys all identifying papers.

Chacón and Leiva investigate the crime. Without any way to identify the victims, their investigation proceeds slowly, though they initially suspect a gangland hit. After using the police's resources to identify the witness' license plates, Trinidad searches his apartment and car. Trinidad takes the man's GPS device, which he uses to identify common locations. Though he attempts to disguise himself, he is caught on a surveillance camera. Trinidad later tracks the man down and pursues him to the subway, where he attempts to kill him, only to be stabbed by an accomplice that the witness calls.

Trinidad and Chacón separately come to realize that the murder victims had ties to Colombian drug cartels. Each seek out Rachid, a police informer who was previously involved with the same groups. Chacón, through her contacts with anti-terrorism intelligence, finds him first. Rachid tells her that his former acquaintances have moved from drugs to Islamist militancy, though he has lost track of where they were based. Chacón questions Trinidad after seeing his egress from the apartment on the apartment complex's surveillance camera, but without any solid evidence she is forced to let him go free.

By threatening Rachid's ex-girlfriend, Trinidad tracks down Rachid, whom he also threatens. Rachid takes Trinidad through Madrid, where they attempt to track down the Islamist terrorist cell to which the witness belongs. Meanwhile, the cell purchases and sets a series of bombs in a Madrid shopping mall hidden as fire extinguishers. Trinidad arrives at their headquarters while they place the bombs. Trinidad kills all of the terrorists, including the witness, before they can remotely detonate the bombs. However, he is again stabbed, this time fatally. Chacón and Leiva arrive at the scene after his death. The film ends with several scenes of crowds of people at the mall, none of whom know that the bombs are still active.

== Cast ==
- José Coronado as Santos Trinidad
- Helena Miquel as Chacón
- Juanjo Artero as Leiva
- Rodolfo Sancho as Rodolfo
- Pedro María Sánchez as Ontiveros
- Younes Bachir as Rachid
- Karim El-Kerem as Young Handsome Guy

== Release ==
The film was presented at the 59th San Sebastián International Film Festival on 17 September 2011. Distributed by Warner Bros., it was released theatrically in Spain on 23 September 2011. After its success at the 26th Goya Awards, the film received a second threatrical run, opening in 112 screens.

== Reception ==
Jonathan Holland of Variety called Coronado's performance "grippingly visceral" and described the film as "credible, fast-moving, hard-nosed fare". Deborah Young of The Hollywood Reporter wrote that the film, while conventional, is "a tense, briskly paced genre thriller". Fionnuala Halligan of Screen Daily called it "a deliciously complicated and gritty Spanish thriller".

In March 2012, American actor Sylvester Stallone expressed interest in making an American adaptation of the film.

=== Accolades ===
Year	Award	Category	Nominee(s)	Result	Ref.
2012	4th Gaudí Awards	Best European Film		Nominated	
2012	26th Goya Awards	Best Film		Won	
2012	26th Goya Awards	Best Director	Enrique Urbizu	Won	
2012	26th Goya Awards	Best Actor	José Coronado	Won	
2012	26th Goya Awards	Best Original Screenplay	Enrique Urbizu, Michel Gaztambide	Won	
2012	26th Goya Awards	Best Editing	Pablo Blanco	Won	
2012	26th Goya Awards	Best Sound	Licio Marcos de Oliveira, Ignacio Royo-Villanova	Won	
2012	26th Goya Awards	Best Original Score	Mario de Benito	Nominated	
2012	26th Goya Awards	Best Supporting Actor	Juanjo Artero	Nominated	
2012	26th Goya Awards	Best Production Supervision	Paloma Molina	Nominated	
2012	26th Goya Awards	Best Cinematography	Unax Mendía	Nominated	
2012	26th Goya Awards	Best Art Direction	Antón Laguna	Nominated	
2012	26th Goya Awards	Best Costume Design	Patricia Monné	Nominated	
2012	26th Goya Awards	Best Makeup and Hairstyles	Montse Boqueras, Nacho Díaz, Sergio Pérez	Nominated	
2012	26th Goya Awards	Best Special Effects	Raúl Romanillos, Chema Remacha	Nominated	
2012	21st Actors and Actresses Union Awards	Best Film Actor in a Leading Role	José Coronado	Won	
2012	21st Actors and Actresses Union Awards	Best Film Actor in a Secondary Role	Juanjo Artero	Nominated	

== See also ==
- List of Spanish films of 2011
