= Kathmandu Lullaby =

- Film poster
- Spanish: Katmandú. Un espejo en el cielo
- Directed by: Icíar Bollaín
- Screenplay by: Icíar Bollaín
- Based on: Una maestra en Katmandú by Victòria Subirana
- Starring: Verónica Echegui
- Cinematography: Antonio Riestra
- Edited by: Nacho Ruiz Capillas
- Music by: Pascal Gaigne
- Production companies: Media Films; Es.docu
- Release date: 3 February 2012
- Running time: 96 minutes
- Country: Spain
- Languages: Spanish; English

Kathmandu Lullaby (Spanish: Katmandú. Un espejo en el cielo; transl. 'Katmandu, A Mirror in the Sky'), is a 2012 Spanish drama film directed by Icíar Bollaín. The film received four Gaudí Awards nominations (Verónica Echegui won for best lead actress) and two Goya Awards nominations. It is based on the book Una maestra en Katmandú by Victòria Subirana.

== Plot ==
The plot follows Laia, a teacher working in a school in Kathmandu. She marries a local man, Tshiring, so she can remain in Nepal once her visa expires.

== Cast ==
- Verónica Echegui as Laila
- Saumyata Bhattarai as Sharmila
- Norbu Tsering Gurung as Tshiring

== Production ==
The film is a Media Films and Levinver/Es.docu production, and it had the collaboration of TVC, TVE and Canal+.

== Accolades ==
Year	Award	Category	Nominee(s)	Result	Ref.
2013	4th Gaudí Awards	Best Film Not in the Catalan Language		Nominated	
2013	4th Gaudí Awards	Best Actress	Verónica Echegui	Won	
2013	4th Gaudí Awards	Best Production Supervision	Carlos González de Jesús, Larry Levene, Anna Casinna	Nominated	
2013	4th Gaudí Awards	Best Cinematography	Antonio Riestra	Nominated	
2013	26th Goya Awards	Best Original Screenplay	Icíar Bollaín	Nominated	
2013	26th Goya Awards	Best Actress	Verónica Echegui	Nominated	
