= Verano azul =

Spanish TV series

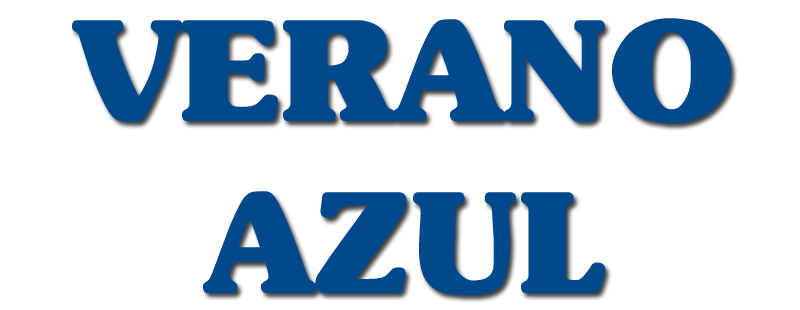
- Genre: Comedy drama; Teen drama
- Created by: Antonio Mercero
- Written by: Horacio Valcárcel; José Ángel Rodero; Antonio Mercero
- Directed by: Antonio Mercero
- Starring: Antonio Ferrandis; María Garralón; Pilar Torres; Cristina Torres; Juan José Artero; José Luis Fernández; Gerardo Garrido; Miguel Ángel Valero; Miguel Joven
- Theme music composer: Carmelo Bernaola
- Country of origin: Spain
- Original language: Spanish
- No. of seasons: 1
- No. of episodes: 19

Production
- Producer: Eduardo Esquide
- Production location: Nerja (Málaga)
- Running time: 60 minutes
- Production company: Televisión Española

Original release
- Network: TVE1
- Release: 11 October 1981 – 14 February 1982

Verano azul (English: Blue Summer) is a Spanish television drama series created and directed by Antonio Mercero. It was first broadcast on La Primera Cadena of Televisión Española (TVE) from 11 October 1981 to 14 February 1982.

The series tells the adventures of a group of youngsters between the ages of 9 and 17, while on summer vacation in a small, unnamed coastal town on the Spanish Mediterranean Costa del Sol. The series was mainly filmed in Nerja, but the name of the town where the story takes place is never mentioned.

With 19 episodes, it drew up to 20 million viewers in Spain (TVE was the only television network available in Spain until 1983) and has been re-run multiple times since then. It was also broadcast in Hispanic America, Portugal, Brazil, France, Yugoslavia, Bulgaria, Poland, and Czechoslovakia.

== Characters ==
=== Main ===
- Chanquete (Antonio Ferrandis), a sailor who lives in La Dorada 1ª, a fishing boat set up as a house on land near a cliff. He was born in 1924.
- Julia (María Garralón) is a lonely painter on vacation in the town. In the chapter "The Rainbow Smile" the reason for her loneliness is revealed. She was born in 1948.
- Bea (Pilar Torres), Tito's sister, is the beautiful official of the group, whose love Javi and Pancho dispute throughout the series. She was born in 1966.
- Desi (Cristina Torres), an inseparable friend of Bea and the daughter of separated parents, which at the time was a novelty: such a scandal is a common comment among the other boys' parents. She was born in 1967.
- Javi (Juan José Artero) is the leader of the gang. Proud, haughty and independent, he often clashes with his father, a defender of a strong hand and old values. He was born in 1967.
- Pancho García (José Luis Fernández) is from the town and works as a delivery man for a grocery store run by his uncles, with whom he lives. He is the character with the most personality in the gang, that is because his parents died. He was born in 1965.
- Quique (Gerardo Garrido), is Javi's best friend, located between the two older boys and the two younger ones, he is a somewhat blurred character. We know he even has a sister, but she isn't part of the gang. He was born in 1968.
- Piraña (Miguel Ángel Valero), his name is Manuel (his parents know him as Manolito), but they call him Piraña because of his passion for eating, bordering on voracity. He is witty and cultured, and Tito's comrade-in-arms. He was born in 1972.
- Tito (Miguel Joven), brother of Bea and is the smallest of the gang. Piraña's partner in arms. He was born in 1973.

=== Recurring ===
- Agustín (Manuel Tejada) is the father of Bea and Tito, calm and always open to dialogue with his children.
- Carmen (Elisa Montés) is the mother of Bea and Tito.
- Javier (Manuel Gallardo) is Javi's father, an authoritarian who cares a lot about business.
- Luisa (Helga Liné) is Javi's mother.
- Jorge (Carlos Larrañaga) is Desi's father. He only appears in one chapter, "The Visitor".
- Pilar (Concha Cuetos) is Desi's mother, who is separated from Jorge, her husband. Cuetos and Larrañaga later worked together again playing a divorced couple in the series Farmacia de guardia (1990-1995), also directed by Mercero.
- Cosme (Manuel Brieva) is Piraña's father.
- Nati (Ofelia Angélica) is Piraña's mother.
- Enrique (Fernando Hilbeck) is Quique's father.
- Mercedes (Concha Leza) is Quique's mother.
- Frasco (Fernando Sánchez Polack) is the owner of the bar where Chanquete usually goes to play dominoes and drink slugs. He is also one of his best friends. In one of the chapters he comes to use force, shotgun in hand, when he believes Chanquete has been killed.
- Buzo (Antonio P. Costafreda) is one of Chanquete's friends. He is characterized by his constant sadness and his weary resignation.
- Epifanio (Roberto Camardiel) is the mayor of the town. He almost always smokes Havana cigars.
- Don José (Emilio Rodríguez) is the town doctor.
- Mari Luz (Esther Gala) is Desi's aunt, who lives with her sister Pilar and her niece. She can't stand her brother-in-law.
- Floro (Lorenzo Ramírez) is a municipal police officer.
- Barrilete (Ricardo Palacios) is another municipal police officer, immensely plump and good-natured.
- Hospital Director (Antonio Mercero) is the Director of the hospital where Chanquete is admitted.
- Woman in a beach (Carmen Martínez Sierra).

== Production ==
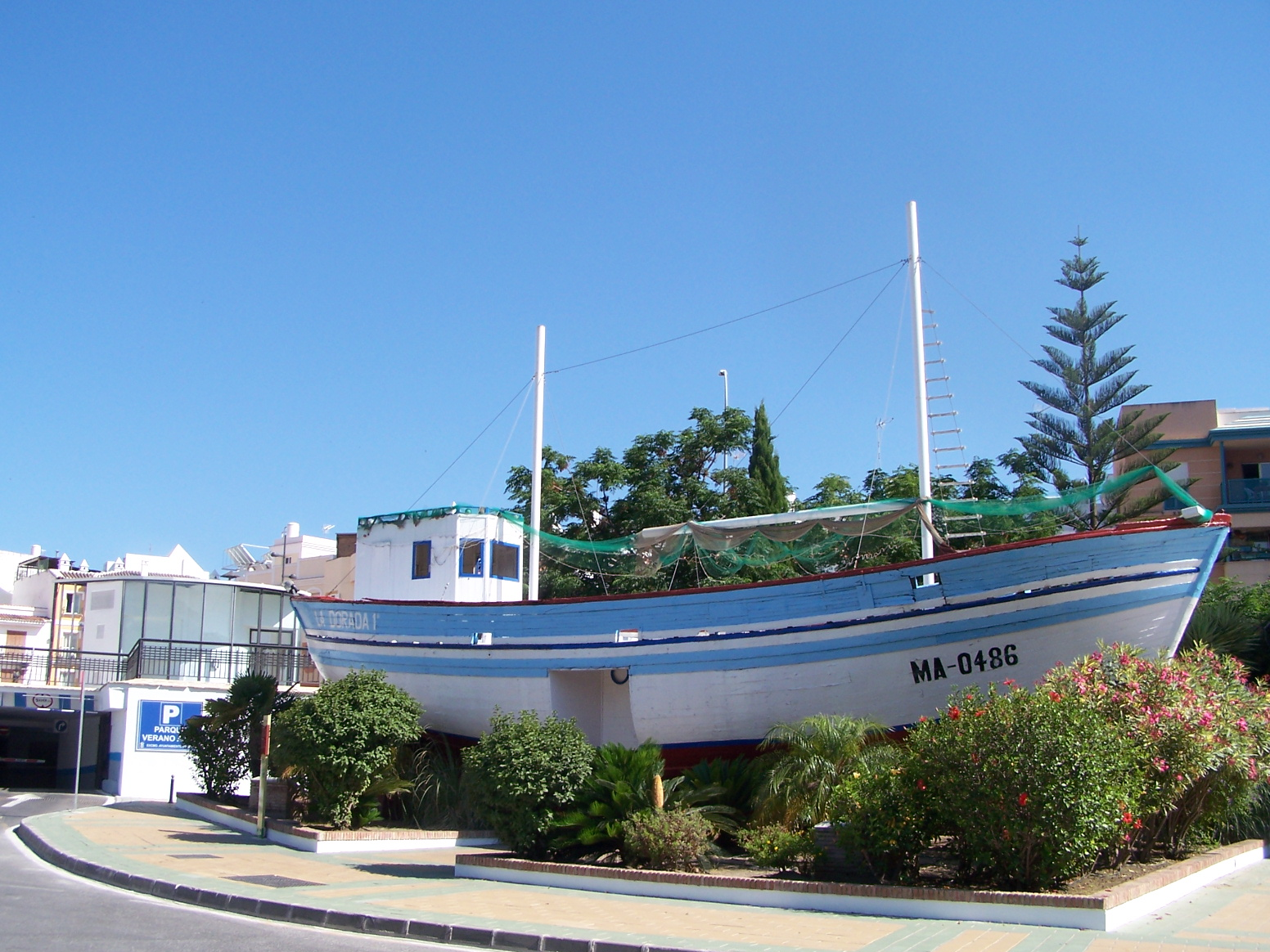
Replica of La Dorada 1ª at the Verano Azul Park in Nerja (in 2010).

Created and directed by Antonio Mercero, and produced by Televisión Española (TVE), the series was filmed in 16 months, between August 1979 and December 1980, mainly in Nerja in the Province of Málaga with additional footage filmed in Motril and Almuñécar in the Province of Granada. There were 20 episodes initially planned but one of the episodes (titled "The Excursion") had to be cancelled during filming due to difficulties in its production.

== List of episodes ==
The order is based on original air date. In later releases, the order of episodes is 1, 2, 7, 9, 3, 5, 4, 6, 17, 13, 11, 8, 10, 12, 14, 15, 16, 18, 19.

No.	Title	Original release date
1	"Encounter"	11 October 1981
Julia, a lonely painter, comes to the coastal town in search of tranquillity. There she meets a group of kids spending their summer vacation in town. After which they meet Pancho, a kid who works in his uncle's store. Finally they meet an old retired sailor named Chanquete. A bond of friendship is created. At first Javi and Pancho compete to win Bea's affections, until Javi gets trapped by the tide in some rocks and Pancho risks his life to save him.
2	"Do not kill my planet, please"	18 October 1981
Tito and Piraña find many dead fish on the beach and run to tell Chanquete. He thinks it is the work of a chemical factory that every so often pollutes the river. Together they go to the city hall to tell the mayor to send a complaint to the factory. The boys form a clean-up patrol with the slogan, "Operation Clean Our Planet" to educate people not to pollute the beach.
3	"Maybe"	25 October 1981
The kids are upset by their parents' rules and punishments, and decide to do something. They agree to go on strike and keep silent, not saying a word to their parents. But with this method they get punished repeatedly. They change tactics several times to no avail until they hit upon the idea of speaking in reverse. After an incident on the beach sees them run into the police, the parents are reconciled with their children.
4	"Beatriz, Mon Amour"	1 November 1981
Bea falls for an older guy and goes for a ride on his bike. Pancho and Javi are jealous and do everything possible to boycott the events and are joined by the other members of the gang. Bea's parents worry that their daughter goes out with an older boy and prohibit her but she does not agree.
5	"Rainbow Smile"	8 November 1981
Julia is depressed by the rain and locks herself in her home without responding to calls from the boys when they go to see her. Later, Chanquete seeks her out after being alerted by Javi and Pancho who heard her crying. He gets into the house by breaking a window. Julia tells him about her past. Her husband and daughter were killed in a car accident two years ago, on a rainy day, just like that one. Chanquete tries to comfort Julia and reminds her that after the storm comes the rainbow.
6	"The Visitor"	15 November 1981
Desi's father visits her and brings a gift, a motorcycle. Desi is excited by the possible reconciliation of her parents. However, the relationship deteriorates anew and she suffers for it. Meanwhile, Tito and Piraña think having separated parents is a great idea because of the many gifts they may get and plan on how to make Piraña's parents separate.
7	"Pancho Panza"	22 November 1981
Tito tells Pancho about a dream Bea had, where a masked rider rescued her from bandits. Pancho thinks about making the dream come true by getting a horse and disguising himself as the masked rider. Meanwhile, Pancho hurts himself and cannot deliver milk. The boys decide to help him make his route. Pancho, unable to use his bike, has to ride a donkey, earning him the nickname "Pancho Panza", by which he is not at all amused.
8	"The slap"	29 November 1981
Javi goes with his parents to the house of a wealthy man. His father intends to do business with this man but Javi embarrasses him, and his father slaps him. Javi, angry, goes to Chanquete and asks him for money and so he can run away. Chanquete gives him the money with one condition: he spends one last night at home and reflects before taking the money. Javi spends all day thinking it over. At night a conversation between his parents makes him change his mind.
9	"Eva"	6 December 1981
A group of hippies leave the beach, with only a girl named Eva staying behind. Javi is attracted by Eva's beauty and asks her to stay with the gang. Eva has been abandoned by her boyfriend because she is pregnant and has decided to have the baby despite his lack of support. The children, Julia and Chanquete help her not to feel lonely. Meanwhile, Tito and Piraña are curious about what it is like to have a child without being married and turn to Chanquete for an explanation.
10	"The knife"	13 December 1981
Some thugs come to town causing commotion with their bikes and breaking telephone booths. Later two other boys fight in Frasco's tavern and one of them pulls a knife. Aggression hovers over the village. Chanquete gets sick and Julia takes care of him.
11	"Bottles"	20 December 1981
A bottle with a message inside appears on the Cala Chica beach while the kids are playing. The message says "I love you Beatriz." Each day a bottle arrives on the beach with the same message. Bea is happy but the boys are jealous. Javi discovers that Pancho is leaving the bottles for Bea. In the end the two boys fight on the beach.
12	"The last performance"	27 December 1981
The kids play dress up for performances at Javi's home. Pancho is making his milk route when he passes by an abandoned house and sees a figure leaning on a window. Running scared to tell the others, together they explore the house. Bea sees the figure of man in the mirror and gets scared and runs away. Later the kids go back with Chanquete and find out that the man, the son of former owner, is a great magician who wants to invite the whole group to dinner and perform his last show for them.
13	"The Green Cat Cave"	3 January 1982
The kids walk alone on a trip to La Cueva del Gato Verde. Pancho gets trapped in the cave while exploring. Quique and Desi go in search of Chanquete and the Civil Guard so to rescue Pancho. As they are taking their time coming, Javi goes into the cave attached to a kite string and rescues Pancho. The boys unwittingly uncover new caves of great geological value. For his part Chanquete helps Julia to sell some paintings and thus prevent her from leaving for lack of money.
14	"The Idol"	10 January 1982
Bruno, a handsome singer and teenage heartthrob, comes to town to shoot a video. Bea and Desi are mad about him and the boys are jealous. Bruno is famous, handsome and rich but not happy and takes refuge at night on the beach where he meets Chanquete and admits the reality of his life.
15	"Dad's house party"	17 January 1982
Enrique, Quique's father, makes efforts to reach out to his son and joins the group to get to know his child better, but all his efforts are useless. He goes to Chanquete for advice. The other parents follow Enrique's example and decide to do the same with their children. They organize a house party and go all together, but the parents have more fun than the children.
16	"We shall not move"	24 January 1982
Promovisa are developers planning to build a new housing project, but cannot do so because Chanquete's plot, where La Dorada stands, is in the middle of the proposed site. They meet with Chanquete and make him a considerable offer but Chanquete refuses to sell his land and leave his home. Promovisa then employs some fellow villagers to threaten Chanquete into selling, but he still refuses. Later they get a digger to demolish La Dorada only to find Julia and the boys occupying the site, chanting "we shall not be moved" and defending the ship.
17	"The Bubble"	31 January 1982
The boys go on a trip to Cala Chica and Bea is dragged away by the current and cannot get back to the shore. A strange man appears and saves her life. When Javi and Quique talk to him, he tells them that he comes from another planet and is waiting for their comrades back in "The Bubble" to pick him up. Some people from an asylum come and catch him. Everyone thinks he's crazy but that same night some strange lights appear on the water.
18	"Something dies in the soul"	7 February 1982
Chanquete goes for a medical examination and is told that his heart is in a delicate state, and he has to go to hospital for some tests, but he refuses. Julia later convinces him to do take the tests. A few days after leaving the hospital Chanquete seems to be recovering, but dies the following day. The children, Julia and all of the others mourn Chanquete.
19	"The end of summer"	14 February 1982
The kids are saddened by the death of their friend Chanquete and by the end of the holiday. They decide to do something special as it is their last day together, but cannot think of anything and get bored. Julia invites them to her home for lunch and then they go along to La Dorada to see how it is. They plant a tree. The next day they all say goodbye until next year. Julia is the last to leave town and gives Pancho a very special gift.
