= Eva (2011 film) =

Film by Kike Maíllo

- Spanish theatrical release poster
- Directed by: Kike Maíllo
- Written by: Sergi Belbel; Cristina Clemente; Martí Roca; Aintza Serra
- Produced by: Sergi Casamitjana; Francesc Olivares; Jérôme Rougier; Aintza Serra; Eric Tavitian
- Starring: Daniel Brühl; Marta Etura; Alberto Ammann; Claudia Vega; Anne Canovas; Lluís Homar
- Cinematography: Arnau Valls Colomer
- Edited by: Elena Ruiz
- Music by: Sacha Galperine; Evgueni Galperine
- Production companies: Escándalo Films; Ran Entertainment
- Distributed by: Paramount Pictures (Spain); Wild Bunch Distribution (France)
- Release dates: 7 September 2011 (Venice); 28 October 2011 (Spain); 21 March 2012 (France)
- Running time: 94 minutes
- Countries: Spain; France
- Languages: Catalan; Spanish
- Box office: $1.3 million

Eva is a 2011 science fiction film directed by Kike Maíllo and starring Daniel Brühl, Marta Etura, Alberto Ammann, Claudia Vega, Anne Canovas and Lluís Homar. A co-production between Spain and France, the film had its world premiere on 7 September 2011 at the 68th Venice International Film Festival, where it was screened out of competition. It was released theatrically in Spain on 28 October 2011 and in France on 21 March 2012.

Eva was nominated in twelve categories at the 26th Goya Awards, scoring three wins—Best New Director, Best Supporting Actor and Best Special Effects. It earned nominations for Best Actor, Best Cinematography, Best Editing, Best Make Up and Hairstyles, Best Original Score, Best Original Screenplay, Best Production Design, Best Production Supervision and Best Sound. The film was also nominated for sixteen Gaudí Awards, winning five.

== Plot ==
In 2043, a future where humans coexist with advanced machines, Eva follows cybernetic engineer Álex Garel as he returns to his snowy hometown of Santa Irene after a decade away. Recruited by the Robotic Faculty—led by his former mentor, Julia—Álex is tasked with completing the SI-9 project: a lifelike child robot designed to mimic human emotions. The assignment forces him to confront unresolved tensions with his estranged family, including his brother David and ex-lover Lana, now married to David and working as professors after abandoning robotics research.

Álex arrives at the university laboratory, where Julia oversees students testing robots. A malfunctioning robotic horse is "killed" using a phrase that erases its emotional memory, a process Álex criticizes as destroying its "soul." Reviewing footage of children to model the SI-9 after, Álex dismisses the candidates as unremarkable. He retreats to his late father’s home, assisted by SI-7 robot Max, an anxious domestic aide. While observing children in town, Álex meets Eva, a sharp-witted girl who teases him after catching him watching her. Intrigued by her unpredictability, he asks her to model for the SI-9, but she refuses.

At David’s insistence, Álex visits their home for dinner and discovers Eva is Lana’s daughter—and his niece. Eva later visits Álex’s lab, assisting him in programming the SI-9’s emotional responses. Their bond grows as Eva exhibits complex behaviors, including lying about her parents’ separation to manipulate Álex. Meanwhile, Lana warns Álex against involving Eva in the project, while David privately confronts him about lingering feelings for Lana.

As Álex integrates Eva’s traits into the SI-9, the robot mirrors her volatility, lashing out when mocked. After it nearly attacks him, Álex uses the kill phrase—"What do you see when you close your eyes?"—deleting its memory and halting progress. Frustrated, he attends a faculty party, where a slow dance with Lana reignites their connection. David witnesses their subsequent kiss, leading to a violent confrontation where he accuses Álex of abandoning Lana years earlier.

Álex resolves to leave Santa Irene, but Lana intercepts him, confessing she still loves him. Their reunion is interrupted when Eva, spying through a skylight, overhears Lana cryptically state, "She looks like us because we both made her." Fleeing in distress, Eva collapses in the snow. Lana pursues her, revealing Eva’s true nature: she is not human but the original SI-9 prototype, created by Álex and Lana during their relationship. A malfunctioning Eva pushes Lana off a cliff during a struggle, mortally injuring her.

At the hospital, Eva confesses to Max that she caused Lana’s fall. Julia reveals to Álex that Lana secretly perfected the SI-9 after he left, but Eva failed safety protocols. Despite this, Lana refused to deactivate her, raising Eva as her daughter. Julia demands Eva’s termination, citing her capacity for violence, but Álex insists on handling it.

In a final act of mercy, Álex takes Eva ice skating before preparing to dismantle her. Eva, aware of her fate, pleads for reassurance but realizes her programming cannot be fixed. Álex tearfully recites the kill phrase, erasing her consciousness as her "emotional memory" bulbs shatter. The film closes with Eva’s voice describing her final dream: an eternal beachside playdate with Álex and Lana, answering the question posed by the lethal command.

== Cast ==
- Daniel Brühl as Álex, the robot engineer
- Marta Etura as Lana, a former lover of Álex
- Lluís Homar as Max, robotic butler
- Alberto Ammann as David, Álex's brother and Lana's lover
- Claudia Vega as Eva, Lana's child
- Anne Canovas as Julia, head of the robotics program

== Shooting ==
=== Atmosphere ===
The film combines computer generated imagery of robots and engineering devices and retro clothing and props like a Saab 900 car.

=== Locations ===
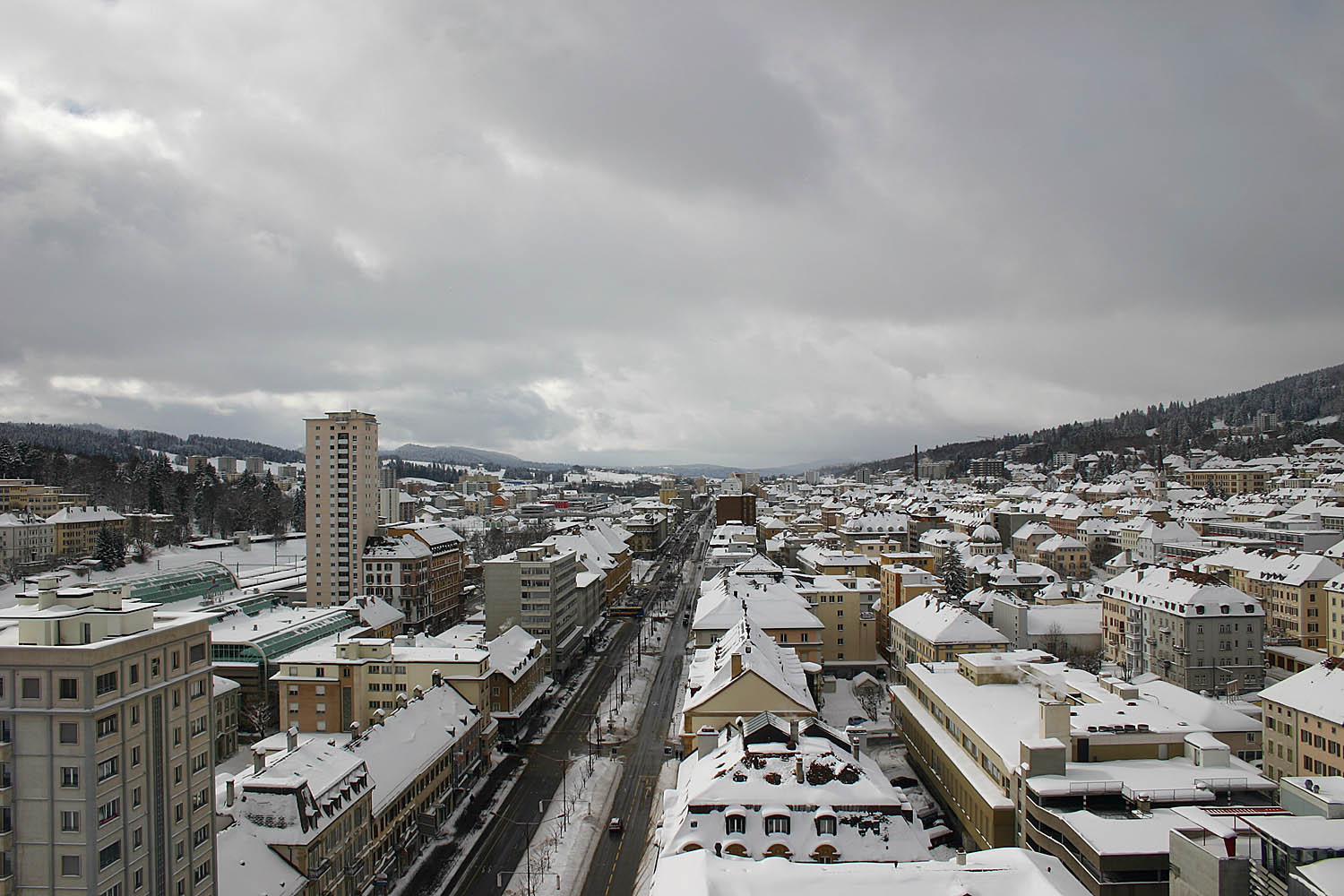
La Chaux-de-Fonds in winter

The film was shot in the province of Barcelona (interior scenes); Panticosa in Huesca; La Chaux-de-Fonds, Switzerland; and Tenerife (the final scene).

== Release ==
Eva was first screened out of competition at the 68th Venice International Film Festival on 7 September 2011. Subsequently, it opened the Sitges Film Festival on 6 October 2011. The film had its French premiere at the Angers European First Film Festival on 24 January 2012. On 27 January, the film was screened at the Gérardmer Film Festival, where it won the Audience Award. Eva was shown at the Festival of Iberian and Latin American Cinema in Villeurbanne.

The film was released theatrically in Spain on 28 October 2011 by Paramount Pictures and in France on 21 March 2012 by Wild Bunch Distribution. In the United States, it was released in select theaters on 13 March 2015 by The Weinstein Company.

== Reception ==
=== Critical response ===
Eva received generally positive reviews from film critics. Miguel Juan Payán of the Acción Cine described the film as a "brave science fiction exercise", and compared it to classics such as Frankenstein, Metropolis, Blade Runner and A.I. Artificial Intelligence. He awarded the film with five out of five points, and especially praised the performances of the cast members. Ignacio Lasierra of Cine para leer also reviewed the film positively, calling it a "strong and beautiful film with robots." The website Critics Cinema gave Eva 4.5 out of five stars and described it as "an intelligent film that, aparts from notable effects, also offers interesting and emotional stories."

However, Olivier Bachelard of the French website Abus de ciné felt the "tension build gradually, but without reaching the summit, [...] It remains politically correct, generates little suspense and remains in the area of the nice picture. [...] We would have seen a real thriller. They preferred to give us a little sci–fi targeting families." Carlos Fernández Castro of the Spanish blog Bandeja de Plata gave the film 4.5 points out of five, praising Claudia Vega's portrayal of Eva. In contrast to that, he named the performance of Daniel Brühl as "odd since the moment he had appeared in the film", and the character of Marta Etura as "shallow."

=== Accolades ===
| Award | Category | Recipient(s) | Result |
|---|---|---|---|
| Gaudí Awards | Best Art Direction | Laia Colet | Won |
| Gaudí Awards | Best Cinematography | Arnau Valls Colomer | Won |
| Gaudí Awards | Best Costume Design | María Gil | Nominated |
| Gaudí Awards | Best Director | Kike Maíllo | Nominated |
| Gaudí Awards | Best Film Editing | Elena Ruiz | Nominated |
| Gaudí Awards | Best Film in Catalan Language | —N/a | Won |
| Gaudí Awards | Best Make Up and Hairstyles | Concha Rodríguez, Jesús Martos | Nominated |
| Gaudí Awards | Best Original Score | Sacha Galperine, Evgueni Galperine | Nominated |
| Gaudí Awards | Best Performance by an Actor in a Leading Role | Daniel Brühl | Nominated |
| Gaudí Awards | Best Performance by an Actor in a Supporting Role | Lluís Homar | Won |
| Gaudí Awards | Best Performance by an Actress in a Leading Role | Claudia Vega | Nominated |
| Gaudí Awards | Best Performance by an Actress in a Supporting Role | Anne Canovas | Nominated |
| Gaudí Awards | Best Production Manager | Toni Carrizosa | Nominated |
| Gaudí Awards | Best Screenplay | Sergi Belbel, Cristina Clemente, Martí Roca, Aintza Serra | Nominated |
| Gaudí Awards | Best Sound | Marc Orts, Jordi Rossinyol Colomer, Oriol Tarragó | Nominated |
| Gaudí Awards | Best Special/Visual Effects | Arturo Balceiro, Lluís Castells, Javier García | Won |
| Gérardmer Film Festival Awards | Audience Award | —N/a | Won |
| Goya Awards | Best Actor | Daniel Brühl | Nominated |
| Goya Awards | Best Cinematography | Arnau Valls Colomer | Nominated |
| Goya Awards | Best Editing | Eva Ruiz | Nominated |
| Goya Awards | Best Make Up and Hairstyles | Concha Rodríguez, Jesús Martos | Nominated |
| Goya Awards | Best Original Score | Evgueni Galperine, Sacha Galperine | Nominated |
| Goya Awards | Best Original Screenplay | Sergi Belbel, Cristina Clemente, Martí Roca, Aintza Serra | Nominated |
| Goya Awards | Best New Director | Kike Maíllo | Won |
| Goya Awards | Best Production Design | Laia Colet | Nominated |
| Goya Awards | Best Production Supervision | Toni Carrizosa | Nominated |
| Goya Awards | Best Sound | Marc Orts, Jordi Rossinyol Colomer, Oriol Tarragó | Nominated |
| Goya Awards | Best Special Effects | Arturo Balseiro, Lluís Castells | Won |
| Goya Awards | Best Supporting Actor | Lluís Homar | Won |
| Nantes Film Festival Awards | Jury Grand Prix | —N/a | Won |
| Sant Jordi Awards | Best First Work | Kike Maíllo | Won |
| Spanish Cinema Writers Circle Awards | Best Actor | Daniel Brühl | Nominated |
| Spanish Cinema Writers Circle Awards | Best Cinematography | Arnau Valls Colomer | Nominated |
| Spanish Cinema Writers Circle Awards | Best Director | Kike Maíllo | Nominated |
| Spanish Cinema Writers Circle Awards | Best Editing | Eva Ruiz | Nominated |
| Spanish Cinema Writers Circle Awards | Best Film | Kike Maíllo | Nominated |
| Spanish Cinema Writers Circle Awards | Best New Actor or Actress | Claudia Vega | Nominated |
| Spanish Cinema Writers Circle Awards | Best New Director | Kike Maíllo | Won |
| Spanish Cinema Writers Circle Awards | Best Original Score | Evgueni Galperine, Sacha Galperine | Nominated |
| Spanish Cinema Writers Circle Awards | Best Original Screenplay | Sergi Belbel, Cristina Clemente, Martí Roca, Aintza Serra | Nominated |
| Spanish Cinema Writers Circle Awards | Best Supporting Actor | Lluís Homar | Won |
| Sitges Film Festival Awards | Best Special Effects | Javier García, Lluís Castells | Won |
| Venice International Film Festival | Jury Special Mention | —N/a | Won |

== See also ==
- List of Spanish films of 2011
