= Frozen Silence =

- Theatrical release poster
- Directed by: Gerardo Herrero
- Screenplay by: Nicolás Saad
- Based on: El tiempo de los emperadores extraños by Ignacio del Valle
- Starring: Juan Diego Botto; Carmelo Gómez; Jordi Aguilar; Gabrielė Malinauskaitė; Rafa Castejón; Jorge de Juan; Francesc Orella; Sergi Calleja; Adolfo Fernández; Carlos Blanco; Andrés Gertrúdix
- Cinematography: Alfredo Mayo
- Edited by: Cristina Pastor
- Music by: Lucio Godoy
- Production companies: Tornasol Films; Castafiore Films; Foresta Films; Zebra Producciones; Lietuvos Kino Kinostudija
- Distributed by: Alta Classics (es)
- Release date: 20 January 2012 (Spain)
- Countries: Spain; Lithuania
- Languages: Spanish; Russian; German
- Budget: €5.2 million
- Box office: €0.4 million

Frozen Silence (Spanish: Silencio en la nieve, lit. 'Silence in the Snow') is a 2012 Spanish-Lithuanian war-time mystery thriller directed by Gerardo Herrero which stars Juan Diego Botto as inspector Arturo Andrade and Carmelo Gómez as a fascist fellow Blue Division member, with both investigating a series of killings in the midst of the Winter in the eastern theatre of World War II. The screenplay by Nicolás Saad is an adaptation of Ignacio del Valle's novel El tiempo de los emperadores extraños.

== Plot ==
Eastern Front of World War II. Winter of 1943. The discovery of the corpse of a soldier with a blood inscription on the chest made with a knife (the start of a series or ritual killings) near Leningrad haunts a battalion of the Blue Division, the unit dispatched by the Francoist dictatorship to help Nazi Germany against the Soviet Union in World War II. Private Arturo Andrade (a former police inspector and someone with a shrouded past suggested to be damning from an ideological standpoint) and fascist sergeant Espinosa team up to crack the mystery, which turns up to be related to a Masonic lodge in Valencia. The film ends with the beginning of the Battle of Krasny Bor.

== Cast ==
- Juan Diego Botto as Arturo Andrade
- Francesc Orella as Zarauza
- Adolfo Fernández as Navajas
- Carmelo Gómez as sargento Espinosa
- Jordi Aguilar as cabo Aparicio
- Víctor Clavijo as sargento Estrada / Ferrer
- Andrés Gertrúdix as Guerrita
- Sergi Calleja as Tiroliro
- Toni Hernández as Servando
- Manu Hernández as Pablito
- Javier Mejía as capitán Larios
- Gabrielė Malinauskaitė as Zira
- Carlos Blanco
- Rafa Castejón as comandante Isart
- Jorge de Juan
- Alex Spijksma

== Production ==
Written by Nicolás Saad, the screenplay is an adaptation of Ignacio del Valle's El tiempo de los emperadores extraños, part of a tetralogy of novels featuring inspector Arturo Andrade. A Spanish-Lithuanian co-production, the film was produced by Tornasol Films, Castafiore Films, Foresta Films, Zebra Producciones, and Lietuvos kino studija. Shooting locations included Alicante's Ciudad de la Luz as well as Lithuania.

== Release ==
Distributed by Alta Classics, the film was theatrically released in Spain on 20 January 2012. Except for a few specific milieus (including specialised critics and the divisionistas, those larping the memory of the Blue Division without having been a member), it was met with general apathy. While it managed to enter as the fourth highest-grossing film at the Spanish box office in its opening weekend (albeit with a modest €195,000), it underperformed throughout its theatrical run, grossing €406,843 (against a €5.2 million budget) and was cited among the Spanish productions with more in-year losses.

== Critical reception ==
Jonathan Holland of Variety deemed the film to be an "ambitious, multilayered thriller", considering that despite an excess of labored dialogue and elements crammed into some plotlines, the film manages to successfully blend "genre excitement with historical intrigue", otherwise singling it out as the best feature by Herrero since The Galíndez File.

Alfonso Rivera of Cineuropa wrote about the film's atmosphere, "rarefied and marred not only because of the murders that reek of revenge, sadism and depravity, but also the little attachment to life of some soldiers, the internal corruption of the troops, the solitude devoid of feelings that is suffered in such circumstances and the desperate search for answers to something that has no reason to be".

Sergi Sánchez of La Razón gave the film a negative review, considering that the film does not work "because the execution is as flat as an ironing board. Because the dialogues are contrived. [And] Because the performances [except for Sergi Calleja's] are affected".

Irene Crespo of Cinemanía rated the film 3 out of 5 stars, summing it up as a "careful production and interesting thriller in the cold Russian front".

== Accolades ==
Year	Award	Category	Nominee(s)	Result	Ref.
2012	21st Actors and Actresses Union Awards	Best Film Actor in a Secondary Role	Carmelo Gómez	Nominated	
2012	21st Actors and Actresses Union Awards	Best Film Actor in a Minor Role	Víctor Clavijo	Nominated	
2013	68th CEC Medals	Best Adapted Screenplay	Nicolás Saad	Nominated	

== See also ==
- List of Spanish films of 2012
