= Alberto Marini =

Italian screenwriter

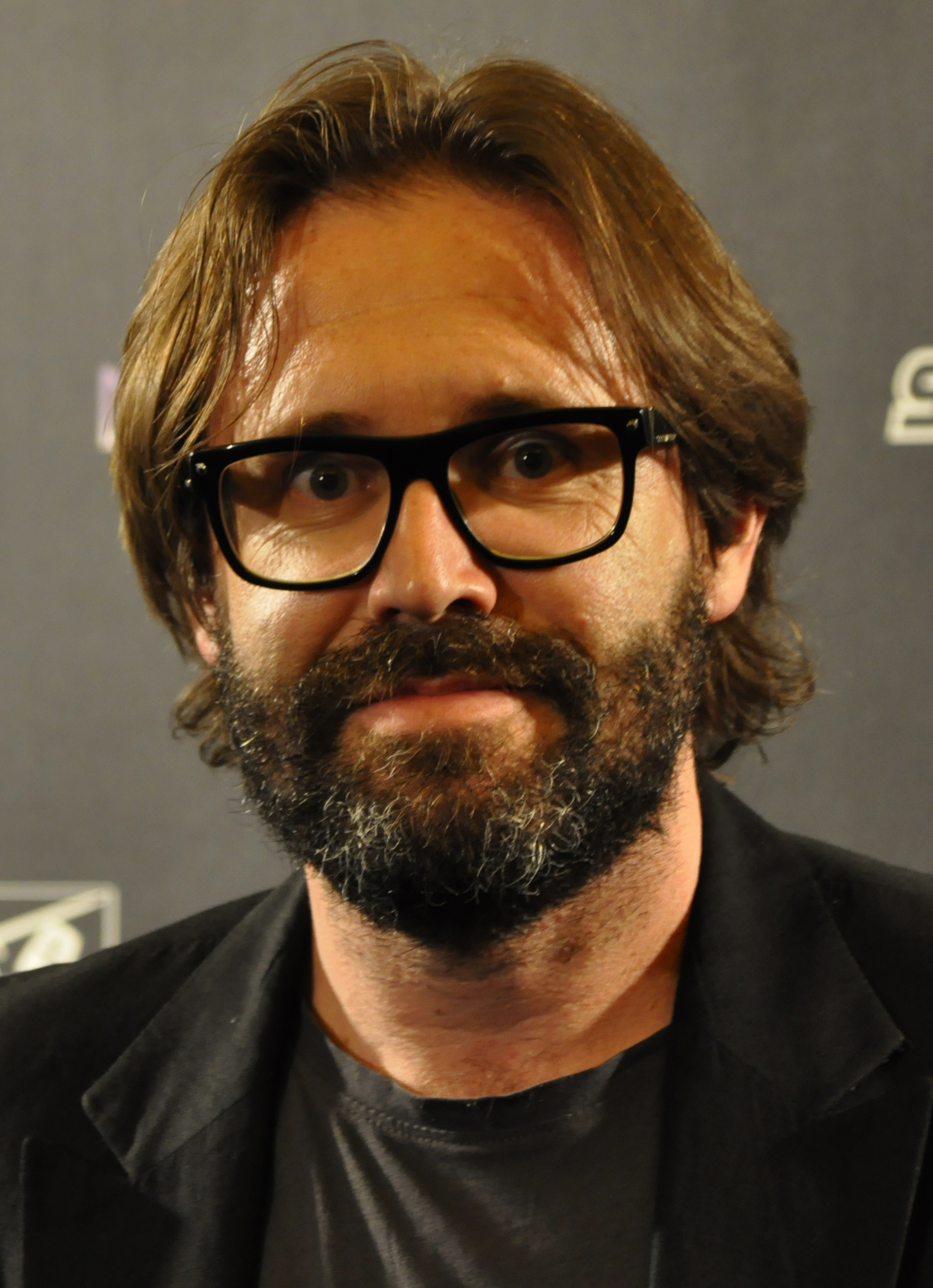
- Marini in 2016
- Born: 1972 (age 53–54); Turin, Italy
- Occupations: Screenwriter; producer

Alberto "Beto" Marini (born 1972) is an Italian screenwriter and producer based in Spain.

== Early life and education ==
Alberto Marini was born in Turin in 1972. He earned a degree in law, with specialisation in audiovisual law.

== Career ==
Based in Barcelona since 1999, he joined Filmax as part of the development department. In 2010, after working for 11 years in the company (working in development, production and/or writing of films), he left the post of production director in order to work in "more personal" works by means of the creation of his own production company Rebelión Terrestre. His writing credits in the 2015 film Retribution earned him a nomination to the Goya Award for Best Original Screenplay. He made his directorial debut with the horror film Summer Camp.

His film work include writing credits in Romasanta (2004), Sleep Tight (2011), Extinction (2015), Retribution (2015), Your Son (2018), and Fatum (2023). He is also the co-creator of the television series La unidad, and co-wrote Paco Plaza's episode "Freddy" from the Stories to Stay Awake horror anthology series. He is set to adapt Arturo Pérez Reverte's El italiano into a television series format.

== Accolades ==
Year	Award	Category	Nominee(s)	Result	Ref.
2012	4th Gaudí Awards	Best Screenplay	Sleep Tight	Won	
2016	30th Goya Awards	Best Original Screenplay	Retribution	Nominated	
2016	14th Mestre Mateo Awards	Best Screenplay	Retribution	Won	
