= El somriure amagat =

- US poster
- Directed by: Ventura Durall
- Screenplay by: Miguel Llansó Ventura Durall
- Produced by: Nanouk Films
- Cinematography: Mauro Herce
- Edited by: Ventura Durall Martí Roca
- Release date: 2010
- Running time: 13'
- Country: Spain

El somriure amagat is a 2010 short film.

== Synopsis ==
Daniel, a 10-year-old Ethiopian boy, roams the streets of Addis Ababa alone by night. He is one of the 170,000 children without family who live in the city. He has just escaped from his home in the countryside where he lived with his stepmother. His biological parents are dead: he never knew his father; his mother died in front of his eyes when she was run over by a car. During his nocturnal rambling, Daniel meets a group of street children who live in an old abandoned taxi. He asks them if he can sleep there.

== Awards and nominations ==
- Medina del Campo 2010
- Festival Madridimagen 2012 (best cinematography, winner Mauro Herce)
- 4th Gaudí Awards, best short film (nominated)
- 2012 Abu Dhabi Film Festival (winner Best Documentary)
- 2012 Ibn Arabi Film Festival (Best documentary, nominated)
