= 21st Actors and Actresses Union Awards =

2012 Spanish award ceremony

- Date: 18 June 2012
- Site: Teatro Circo Price, Madrid, Spain
- Hosted by: Yayo Cáceres
- Organized by: Actors and Actresses Union

Highlights
- Honorary career award: Concha Velasco

The 21st Actors and Actresses Union Awards ceremony was held on 18 June 2012 at the Teatro Circo Price in Madrid. The gala was hosted by Yayo Cáceres.

In addition to the competitive awards the association 'Madres unidas contra la droga' and activist Alejandra Soler Gilabert received the 'Mujeres en Unión' award, Concha Velasco the 'Toda una vida' career award and the Special Award went to the Association for the Recovery of Historical Memory and the Federación Estatal de Foros por la Memoria.

== Winners and nominees ==
The winners and nominees are listed as follows:

=== Film ===
| Best Male Performance in a Leading Role: José Coronado — No Rest for the Wicked; Ben Temple — I Want to Be a Soldier; Antonio Banderas — The Skin I Live In | Best Female Performance in a Leading Role: María León — The Sleeping Voice; Inma Cuesta — The Sleeping Voice; Elena Anaya — The Skin I Live In |
| Best Male Performance in a Secondary Role: Raúl Arévalo — Cousinhood; Juanjo Artero — No Rest for the Wicked; Carmelo Gómez — Frozen Silence | Best Female Performance in a Secondary Role: Ana Wagener — The Sleeping Voice; Maribel Verdú — Chrysalis; Charo Zapardiel — The Sleeping Voice |
| Best Best Male Performance in a Minor Role: Antonio de la Torre — Cousinhood; Ginés García Millán — 17 Hours; Víctor Clavijo — Frozen Silence | Best Best Female Performance in a Minor Role: Petra Martínez — Sleep Tight; Marisa Paredes — The Skin I Live In; Susi Sánchez — The Skin I Live In |

=== Television ===
| Best Male Performance in a Leading Role: Javier Gutiérrez — Águila Roja; José Luis García Pérez — Amar en tiempos revueltos; Félix Gómez — 14 de abril. La República | Best Female Performance in a Leading Role: Alicia Borrachero — Crematorio; Itziar Miranda — Amar en tiempos revueltos; Adriana Ozores — Gran Hotel |
| Best Male Performance in a Secondary Role: Alejo Sauras — 14 de abril. La República; Luis Callejo — El barco; Tomás del Estal — Bandolera | Best Female Performance in a Secondary Role: Juana Acosta — Crematorio; Victoria Abril — Hospital Central; Carmen Gutiérrez — Amar en tiempos revueltos |
| Best Male Performance in a Minor Role: Álex Angulo — 14 de abril. La República; Víctor Clavijo — 14 de abril. La República; Sergio Peris-Mencheta — Tierra de Lobos | Best Female Performance in a Minor Role: Chusa Barbero — Crematorio; Macarena García — Amar en tiempos revueltos; Elisa Matilla — Tierra de Lobos |

=== Theatre ===
| Best Male Performance in a Leading Role: Asier Etxeandia — La avería; Rafa Castejón — Comedia y sueño; Fael García — Fair Play | Best Female Performance in a Leading Role: Asunción Balaguer — El pisito; África Gozalbes — Toc Toc; Ana Gracia — Comedia y sueño |
| Best Male Performance in a Secondary Role: Daniel Grao — La avería; Ernesto Arias — Veraneantes; Manuel Morón — Comedia y sueño | Best Female Performance in a Secondary Role: Elisabet Gelabert — Veraneantes; Alicia Borrachero — Comedia y sueño; Violeta Pérez — Los ojos |
| Best Male Performance in a Minor Role: Chema Muñoz — Veraneantes; Cristóbal Suárez — Veraneantes; Óscar Velado — Los ojos | Best Female Performance in a Minor Role: María Isasi — Incrementum; Ainhoa Aldanondo — Incrementum; Anabel Maurín — Macbeth |

=== Newcomers ===
| Best New Actor: Jan Cornet — The Skin I Live In; José Mota — As Luck Would Have It; Rodrigo Sáenz de Heredia — Half of Oscar | Best New Actress: Rebeca Valls — Burundanga; Mónica Antonópulos — Cuestión de principios; Kontxu Odriozola — Urte berri on, amona! |
