= El comisario =

Spanish television series (1999–2009)

- Genre: Police procedural
- Country of origin: Spain
- Original language: Spanish
- No. of seasons: 12
- No. of episodes: 191

Production
- Running time: 60 min (approx.)
- Production companies: BocaBoca; Estudios Picasso

Original release
- Network: Telecinco
- Release: 16 April 1999 – 2 January 2009

Related
- El Príncipe

El comisario is a Spanish police drama television series that originally aired for twelve seasons from 1999 to 2009 on Telecinco. Produced by BocaBoca and Estudios Picasso and starring an ensemble cast with the likes of Tito Valverde, Juanjo Artero, Elena Irureta, Marcial Álvarez, Jaime Pujol, Cristina Perales and Fernando Andina, among others, the plot tracks the daily life the members of the Cuerpo Nacional de Policía at the police station of San Fernando in Madrid.

== Premise ==
The fiction, a police drama, is set in the 'San Fernando' police station, in the fictional district of the same name in Madrid. It deals with the daily life of the Cuerpo Nacional de Policía agents working in the station.

Gerardo Castilla serves as a cold but respectful Chief Police officer for the entire series. Recurring personal subplots include the friendship between Pope and Charlie, and the up and downs of the relationship between Charlie and Elo.

== Cast ==
=== Final cast ===
Actor	Character	Seasons
Tito Valverde	Gerardo Castilla	1 – 12
Joaquín Climent	Pascual Moreno	1 – 12
Elena Irureta	Laura Hurtado	1 – 12
Juanjo Artero	Carlos "Charlie" Márquez	1 – 12
Jaime Puyol	Andrés Casqueiro	1 – 12
Marcial Álvarez	Jorge "Pope" San Juan	1 – 12
Cristina Perales	Eloísa "Elo" Soriano	1 – 12
Patxi Freytez	Mikel Miralles	2 – 12
Fernando Andina	Lucas Aguilar	5 – 12
Rocío Muñoz	Eva Ríos	9 – 12
Iris Díaz	Vanesa Santana	9 – 12
Eva Martín	Josefa "Pepa" Romero	11 – 12
Ruth Gabriel	Federica "Fede" Villalta	12
José Luís Torrijos	Santos Marino	12
Cristina Castaño	Sara Ruíz	12

=== Departed cast ===
Actor	Character	Seasons
Andoni Ferreño	Vidal	1
Nathalie Poza	Alicia Ponce	1
Tristán Ulloa	Julio Ponce	1 – 2
María Jesús Sirvent	Rosario Ponce	1 – 4
Francesc Orella	† Telmo Chacón	2 – 4
Mar Regueras	Dolores "Lola" Écija	2 – 5
Charo Zapardiel	† Rita Carvajal	1 – 7
Silvia Abascal / Mercé Llorens	Sonia Castilla	1 – 2 / 8
Laura Domínguez	Cristina "Tina" Mariño	1 – 4 / 8
Pilar Punzano	† Ángela Alonso	6 – 8
Manu Fullola	José Raimundo "Joserra" García	6 – 8
Zutoia Alarcia	Elena Serrano	6 – 10
Margarita Lascoiti	Guadalupe "Lupe" López	1 – 11
Paula Echevarría	† Clara Osma	8 – 11
Marisol Membrillo	† Ángeles "Geli" Chamorro	9 – 11
Diego Molero	Horacio Abarca	9 – 11

== Production and release ==
Produced by BocaBoca and Estudios Picasso, the series was known as 'Las calles de San Fernando' prior to its release. The producers initially envisioned a dramedy, but the series was eventually re-written as a police drama. The series began airing on 26 April 1999. The series featured a 50 million peseta budget per episode, high for Spanish television at the time. The broadcasting run ended on 2 January 2009, after nearly 10 years on-air, 12 seasons and 191 episodes.

Tito Valverde and Juanjo Artero reprised their characters in El Príncipe in 2016, in guest appearances.

== Episodes ==
Series	Episodes	Originally released			Average viewership	Share (%)	Ref.
Series	Episodes	First released	Last released	Network	Average viewership	Share (%)	Ref.
1	9	26 April 1999	21 June 1999	Telecinco	4,426,000	26.6	
2	17	3 January 2000	24 April 2000	Telecinco	4,100,000	24.4	
3	22	8 January 2001	28 May 2001	Telecinco	4,250,000	24.8	
4	14	7 January 2002	9 April 2002	Telecinco	3,733,000	22.3	
5	15	3 September 2002	18 December 2002	Telecinco	3,750,000	22.9	
6	13	23 April 2003	16 July 2003	Telecinco	3,909,000	25.7	
7	13	7 January 2004	31 March 2004	Telecinco	4,631,000	26.1	
8	20	19 October 2004	18 March 2005	Telecinco	4,920,000	29.2	
9	24	18 November 2005	25 April 2006	Telecinco	4,257,000	24.6	
10	12	10 October 2006	26 December 2006	Telecinco	4,165,000	23.0	
11	16	14 September 2007	14 December 2007	Telecinco	3,493,000	22.6	
12	16	12 September 2008	2 January 2009	Telecinco	2,122,000	15.1	
