= Anne Canovas =

French actress

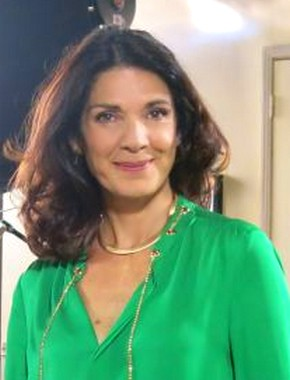
- Born: 25 October 1957 (age 68); Algiers, Algeria
- Occupation: Actress
- Years active: 1978-present

Anne Canovas (born 25 October 1957) is a French actress. She appeared in more than sixty films since 1978.

== Selected filmography ==
Year	Title	Role	Notes
1983	Zeder	Alessandra	
1985	Christopher Columbus		
1990	Vincent & Theo		
2004	An Italian Romance	Ines	
2004	A Common Thread		
2011	Eva	Juila	
