= Clara Campoamor, la mujer olvidada =

2014 Spanish telefilm

- Genre: Period drama Political fiction
- Screenplay by: Yolanda García Serrano; Rafa Russo
- Directed by: Laura Mañá
- Starring: Elvira Mínguez; Antonio de la Torre; Mónica López
- Composer: Xavier Capellas
- Country of origin: Spain
- Original language: Spanish

Production
- Cinematography: Sergio Gallardo
- Running time: 90 minutes
- Production companies: Televisión Española; Televisió de Catalunya; Distinto Films

Original release
- Network: La 1
- Release: 9 March 2011

Clara Campoamor, la mujer olvidada is a Spanish period drama television film directed by Laura Mañá. Focused on the figure of Clara Campoamor, it stars Elvira Mínguez in the leading role. It originally aired on La 1 on 9 March 2011.

== Premise ==
Set in the Second Spanish Republic, the fiction follows Clara Campoamor's struggle for women's active suffrage in the parliamentary meetings of the Cortes, where she convinced the majority of the house of her cause.

== Cast ==
- Elvira Mínguez as Clara Campoamor.
- Antonio de la Torre as Antonio García.
- Mónica López as Victoria Kent.
- Joan Carrera as José Álvarez-Buylla.
- Pep Cruz as Indalecio Prieto.
- Jordi Sánchez as José María Gil-Robles.
- Mingo Ràfols as Manuel Azaña.
- Fermí Reixach as Alejandro Lerroux
- Joan Massotkleiner as Alcalá Zamora.
- Montserrat Carulla as Pilar.
- Roger Casamajor as Ignacio.
- Sara Espígul as Lola.

== Production and release ==
Jointly produced by Distinto Films, Televisió de Catalunya and Televisión Española, the film was directed by Laura Mañá, whereas the screenplay was authored by Yolanda García Serrano and Rafa Russo. Sergio Gallardo worked as cinematography director and Xavier Capellas as composer of the musical score. While chiefly set in Madrid, scenes set in the interior of the Palacio de las Cortes were actually shot in the seat of the Parliament of Catalonia in Barcelona. Filming ended in late 2010 in Madrid with an outdoor scene shot at the entrance of the Palacio de las Cortes.

It premiered in prime time on 9 March 2011 on La 1, earning 2,634,000 viewers and a 13.3% audience share. It re-aired on La 1, TV3 and La 2.

== Awards and nominations ==
Year	Award	Category	Nominee(s)	Result	Ref.
2011	Prix Europa	Best TV Fiction		Nominated	
2012	4th Gaudí Awards	Best TV Movie		Nominated	
