= Juanjo Artero =

Spanish actor

Juan José Artero
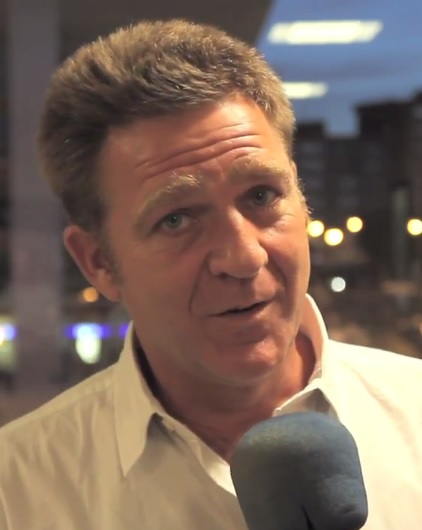
- Artero in 2012
- Born: 27 June 1965 (age 61); Madrid, Spain
- Occupation: Actor

Juan José "Juanjo" Artero (born 27 June 1965) is a Spanish actor. Singularly remembered for his performance as teenager in Verano azul, he is also known for his performance in El barco or his 12-season-long performance as Charlie in El comisario.

== Biography ==
Artero was born in Madrid on 27 June 1965. His father was a physician who treated Franco during the latter's last rales. At age 14, Antonio Mercero cast him for the role of Javi in the popular series Verano azul, a role for which Artero is singularly remembered and which marked his acting career. Following the success of the series, Artero released a music album together with fellow Verano azul performer José Luis Fernández, going as "Pancho y Javi". His adult television career consolidated with his 10-year-long performance as Charlie in El comisario. He has since starred in series such as El barco, Amar es para siempre and Servir y proteger.

His performance playing a 'good cop' in the 2011 film No Rest for the Wicked earned him a nomination to the Goya Award for Best Supporting Actor in 2012. Linked to Arenas de San Pedro, Artero purchased a plot in Hontanares, a hamlet belonging to the municipality, seeking to open a rural hotel. He suffered a pulmonary embolism in March 2019.

== Filmography ==
Television

Year	Title	Role	Notes	Ref
1981–1982	Verano azul	Javi		
1997	Los negocios de mamá			
1999–2009	El comisario	Subinspector Carlos Márquez, "Charlie"	Seasons 1–12	
2000	Hospital Central	Charlie	Guest. Reprise of his role in El comisario	
2004	Siete vidas	Charlie	Guest. Reprise of his role in El comisario	
2011–2013	El barco	Captain Ricardo Montero		
2013	Frágiles	Julián	Guest	
2014–2016	Amar es para siempre	Víctor Reyes	Introduced in season 3. 403 episodes	
2016	El Príncipe	Carlos Márquez, "Charlie"	Guest. Reprise of his role in El comisario	
2017–	Servir y proteger	Comisario Emilio Bremón		

Film

Year	Title	Role	Notes	Ref
1989	El río que nos lleva	Rubio		
1997	Corazón loco	Tocólogo		
2011	No habrá paz para los malvados (No Rest for the Wicked)	Leiva		

== Awards and nominations ==
Year	Award	Category	Work	Result	Ref.
2012	67th CEC Medals	Best Supporting Actor	No Rest for the Wicked	Nominated	
2012	26th Goya Awards	Best Supporting Actor	No Rest for the Wicked	Nominated	
2012	21st Actors and Actresses Union Awards	Best Film Actor in a Secondary Role	No Rest for the Wicked	Nominated	
2024	32nd Actors and Actresses Union Awards	Best Stage Actor in a Leading Role	El milagro de la tierra	Pending	
