= The Sleeping Voice =

- Theatrical release poster
- Spanish: La voz dormida
- Directed by: Benito Zambrano
- Written by: Ignacio del Moral; Benito Zambrano
- Based on: La voz dormida by Dulce Chacón
- Produced by: Antonio P. Pérez
- Starring: Inma Cuesta; María León; Marc Clotet; Daniel Holguín
- Cinematography: Álex Catalán
- Edited by: Fernando Pardo
- Music by: Magda Rosa Galban; Juan Antonio Leyva
- Production companies: Maestranza Films; Mirada Sur
- Distributed by: Warner Bros. Pictures
- Release dates: September 2011 (Zinemaldia); 21 October 2011 (Spain)
- Running time: 128 minutes
- Country: Spain
- Language: Spanish

The Sleeping Voice (Spanish: La voz dormida) is a 2011 Spanish drama film directed by Benito Zambrano based on the novel of the same name by Dulce Chacón. It stars Inma Cuesta, María León, Marc Clotet and Daniel Holguín.

== Plot ==
Two sisters find themselves caught up in politics in the turmoil following the Spanish Civil War. The pregnant Hortensia is locked away in a crowded women's prison. Her younger sister Pepita moves from Andalusia to Madrid to be near her. In Madrid, she finds a job in a wealthy home with connections in the Francoist regime. Pepita meets young guerrilla fighter (maquis) Paulino and falls in love with him.

== Cast ==
- Inma Cuesta as Hortensia
- María León as Pepita
- Marc Clotet as Paulino
- Daniel Holguín as Felipe
- Ana Wagener as Mercedes
- Susi Sánchez as Sor Serafines
- Ángela Cremonte as Elvira
- Berta Ojea as La Zapatones
- Lola Casamayor as Reme
- Antonio Dechent as juez
- Miryam Gallego as Doña Amparo
- Lluís Marco as Don Gonzalo
- Fermí Reixach as capellán
- Amparo Vega-León as Sole
- Charo Zapardiel as Tomasa

== Production ==
The film was produced by Maestranza Films alongside Mirada Sur, and had support from the Spanish Ministry of Culture, the Junta de Andalucía, the Diputación de Huelva, TVE, Canal+ and Canal Sur. Antonio Pérez is credited as producer and Álex Catalán as cinematographer. Shooting locations included the Plaza Mayor in Madrid. Around a 40% of the footage was shot in the province of Huelva.

== Release ==
The film screened at the 59th San Sebastián International Film Festival (SSIFF). Distributed by Warner Bros Entertainment España, it was theatrically released on 21 October 2021. The Sleeping Voice made the shortlist of three candidates for the Spanish submission to the 84th Academy Awards together with The Skin I Live In and Black Bread, but the latter film became the final choice.

== Accolades ==
Year	Award	Category	Nominee(s)	Result	Ref.
2011	San Sebastián International Film Festival	Silver Shell for Best Actress	María León	Won	
2012	17th Forqué Awards	Best Film		Nominated	
2012	17th Forqué Awards	Best Actress	María León	Nominated	
2012	26th Goya Awards	Best Film		Nominated	
2012	26th Goya Awards	Best Director	Benito Zambrano	Nominated	
2012	26th Goya Awards	Best Adapted Screenplay	Benito Zambrano, Ignacio del Moral	Nominated	
2012	26th Goya Awards	Best Original Song	"Nana de la hierbabuena" by Carmen Agredano	Won	
2012	26th Goya Awards	Best Actress	Inma Cuesta	Nominated	
2012	26th Goya Awards	Best Supporting Actress	Ana Wagener	Won	
2012	26th Goya Awards	Best New Actor	Marc Clotet	Nominated	
2012	26th Goya Awards	Best New Actress	María León	Won	
2012	26th Goya Awards	Best Costume Design	María José Iglesias García	Nominated	
2012	21st Actors and Actresses Union Awards	Best Film Actress in a Leading Role	María León	Won	
2012	21st Actors and Actresses Union Awards	Best Film Actress in a Leading Role	Inma Cuesta	Nominated	
2012	21st Actors and Actresses Union Awards	Best Film Actress in a Secondary Role	Ana Wagener	Won	
2012	21st Actors and Actresses Union Awards	Best Film Actress in a Secondary Role	Charo Zapardiel	Nominated	

== See also ==
- List of Spanish films of 2011
