= The Double Steps =

2011 film by Isaki Lacuesta

- Los pasos dobles
- Directed by: Isaki Lacuesta
- Written by: Isaki Lacuesta; Isa Campo
- Produced by: Luisa Matienzo; Dan Wechsler
- Starring: Bokar Dembele; Miquel Barceló; Alou Cissé; Hamadoun Kassogué
- Cinematography: Diego Dussuel
- Edited by: Domi Parra
- Music by: Gerard Gil
- Production companies: Tusitala Producciones Cinematográficas; Bord Cadre Films
- Distributed by: Avalon
- Release dates: 19 September 2011 (San Sebastián); 23 September 2011 (Spain)
- Running time: 86 minutes
- Countries: Spain; Switzerland
- Languages: Bambara; French

The Double Steps (Spanish: Los pasos dobles) is a 2011 Spanish–Swiss experimental docufiction adventure film directed by Isaki Lacuesta, who co-wrote it with Isa Campo. Loosely inspired by apocryphal accounts of the French writer and artist François Augiéras, it combines fiction, re-enactment and documentary elements in two interwoven stories set in Mali. The film features non-professional Malian performers alongside Spanish artist Miquel Barceló, appearing as himself.

The film premiered in the official competition of the 59th San Sebastián International Film Festival, where it won the Golden Shell, the festival's highest award. It later received the Special Jury Prize for Ibero-American Fiction Feature Film at the 2012 Guadalajara International Film Festival.

== Plot ==
The film draws on the legend that François Augiéras painted the walls of an abandoned military bunker in the African desert, sealed it and allowed it to disappear beneath the sand so that the work would not be found until the 21st century.

Two storylines unfold in parallel. In one, a group travels across the Dogon Country looking for the lost bunker and its paintings. Miquel Barceló, who regards Augiéras as an artistic double, joins the search. In the other, episodes from an imagined life of Augiéras are transposed to Mali and played by African performers. Bokar Dembele portrays Abdullah Chambaa, a soldier who claims to be Augiéras and is abandoned by his unit. The travellers follow a series of enigmatic clues—including a skeletal baobab, a bronze amulet and a stone fish—as distinctions between the historical artist, his legends and the contemporary search gradually dissolve.

== Cast ==
- Bokar Dembele (also known as Bouba) as Abdullah Chambaa
- Miquel Barceló as himself
- Alou Cissé (also known as Zol)
- Hamadoun Kassogué
- Amon Pegnere Dolo
- Amassagou Dolo
- Djenebou Keita
- Soumaïla Sabata
- Mahamadou Camara

== Production ==
The project originated in conversations between Lacuesta and Barceló about the painter's life and work in Africa. Barceló told the director the story of Augiéras's supposedly buried bunker, which became the point of departure for a fictional film about the two artists. Lacuesta and Campo developed the narrative around parallels between Augiéras and Barceló and between European and West African storytelling traditions.

Filming took place in Mali, principally in the Dogon Country, with a mixed European and African crew. Most of the Malian cast were non-professional performers found in streets and markets; rather than playing themselves, they enacted fictional characters derived from the stories surrounding Augiéras. According to producer Luisa Matienzo, the production supported a crew of about 60 people for almost four months in remote locations without electricity. Equipment transported from Europe included two high-definition cameras, generators and four tonnes of clay for Barceló and choreographer Josef Nadj's performance Paso Doble.

The same shoot produced a companion documentary, El cuaderno de barro, about Barceló's creative process in Mali and his performance with Nadj. The films were shot simultaneously in the same locations but took different approaches: The Double Steps is a fictional work based on the mythology surrounding Augiéras, while The Clay Diaries documents Barceló's work and the preparations for Paso Doble.

Diego Dussuel served as cinematographer, Domi Parra edited the film and Gerard Gil composed its music. Tusitala Producciones Cinematográficas of Spain and Bord Cadre Films of Switzerland produced the film, with the participation of Televisión Española and Televisió de Catalunya.

== Release ==
The Double Steps was presented in the official competition of the 59th San Sebastián International Film Festival in September 2011 and opened theatrically in Spain on 23 September, distributed by Avalon.

Its subsequent festival circuit included the Chicago International Film Festival and Busan International Film Festival in 2011, followed in 2012 by the International Film Festival Rotterdam, Buenos Aires International Festival of Independent Cinema and San Francisco International Film Festival. The Museum of Modern Art in New York presented the film in a week-long run from 1 to 8 October 2012.

== Reception ==
Critical response was divided, with reviewers generally noting the film's visual ambition and unconventional, non-linear construction while disagreeing about its narrative effectiveness. Jay Weissberg of Variety described its blend of documentary, re-creation and fiction as visually impressive but narratively difficult. Jonathan Holland of The Hollywood Reporter considered it a disappointing follow-up to Lacuesta's earlier work.

By contrast, Ronald Bergan of Slant Magazine called it the best and most original film in the San Sebastián competition, praising its departure from conventional linear narrative. He described its structure as two parallel strands: the search for Augiéras's bunker and a reimagining of the artist's life with a Black African performer playing the white French artist. Reviewing the film after its New York presentation, Manohla Dargis of The New York Times found the relationship between the film's disparate components unclear and argued that some of its art-cinema conventions risked becoming clichés.

The award of the Golden Shell was regarded as a surprise in contemporary coverage. It made The Double Steps the first Spanish film to receive the prize since Mondays in the Sun in 2002.

== Accolades ==
Year	Award / festival	Category	Result
2011	59th San Sebastián International Film Festival	Golden Shell	Won
2012	4th Gaudí Awards	Best Non-Catalan-Language Film	Nominated
2012	27th Guadalajara International Film Festival	Special Jury Prize – Ibero-American Fiction Feature Film	Won

The San Sebastián award is recorded in the festival's official archive. The Guadalajara festival's official archive lists the film as the Special Jury Prize winner in the Ibero-American fiction feature competition.

== See also ==
- List of Spanish films of 2011
