= Sleep Tight (film) =

- Theatrical release poster
- Spanish: Mientras duermes
- Directed by: Jaume Balagueró
- Written by: Alberto Marini
- Produced by: Julio Fernández
- Starring: Luis Tosar; Marta Etura; Alberto San Juan
- Cinematography: Pablo Rosso
- Edited by: Guillermo de la Cal
- Music by: Lucas Vidal
- Production company: Castelao Producciones
- Distributed by: Filmax
- Release dates: September 2011 (Fantastic Fest); 14 October 2011 (Spain)
- Running time: 102 minutes
- Country: Spain
- Language: Spanish
- Budget: $5 million
- Box office: $8.7 million

Sleep Tight (Note: The film previously went by the working title Flatmate.) (Spanish: Mientras duermes; lit. 'While You Sleep') is a 2011 Spanish psychological thriller film directed by Jaume Balagueró from a screenplay by Alberto Marini which stars Luis Tosar alongside Marta Etura. In the film, César (Tosar), a concierge of an apartment building, is unable to reach happiness no matter what happens to him, and he has a goal to make the tenants upset. Clara (Etura) proves to César that making her upset is harder than he expected and things turn to a twisted event when her boyfriend Marcos visits her. Sleep Tight was among the most anticipated films to premiere at the 44th Sitges Film Festival.

== Plot ==
A concierge of an apartment building in Barcelona named César is on the roof of a building explaining his nature of not being able to find any happiness no matter what he does or what good things happen to him. As he wakes up in Clara's apartment and begins his routine working in the main lobby, he gives hush money to teen Úrsula, the daughter of another tenant. César visits his sick mother in the hospital, who is practically unable to speak to her son but listens to him talk about Clara. Verónica, another tenant, asks César to take care of her dogs, giving detailed directions on how to feed them. César ignores her instructions and feeds her dog Rocío a slice of pie.

Clara, entering her apartment, opens up letters she has received then tears them up and throws them all away. While this is happening, César hides under her bed waiting for her to fall asleep in order to use chloroform to keep her asleep so he can inject a hypodermic needle filled with caustic soda into her care products. The morning after, he sneaks out of Clara's apartment with Úrsula waiting outside. She demands that César provide her with an adult movie if he wants her to keep her mouth shut. César, working in the lobby, finds Verónica heading out of the apartment. He questions Verónica where Rocío is and she explains that Rocío has horrible diarrhea from something he may have eaten.

Úrsula, sneaking out of school, goes to César's apartment and asks for the videotape. She tells him that she and Clara talked about César and the price for her keeping her mouth shut will be €100. César has also angered another of the tenants by not taking care of the plants, killing them. Visiting his mother at the hospital again, César says that he is close to wiping Clara's smile off her face as his goal is to make his tenants miserable. The apartment cleaners are informed by César that the office was not cleaned properly which leads to the cleaner's son being in trouble.

César, once again hiding under Clara's bed, uses chloroform on her to keep her in a deep sleep and begins messing with more of Clara's items and planting bug eggs in her apartment. A couple of days pass and Clara's rashes, which she was developing due to César messing with her care products, have slightly gone away, relieved for a second she finds many cockroaches in her apartment and decides to stay with her mother until César fumigates her apartment. The police get involved to figure out who is harassing Clara and César frames the cleaner's son which leads to his arrest.

César returns to Clara's apartment, and while hiding under her bed he finds that she brought her boyfriend Marcos as well. Having accidentally been hit by some chloroform on his face upon the shaking of Marcos and Clara's fornication, César makes a desperate attempt to leave the apartment quietly but realizes he has the wrong keys to the apartment, leaving him locked inside. César wakes up in Clara's shower and begins to worry as Marcos had found César's sports bag with many suspicious items. Marcos catches César trying to sneak out of the apartment. He explains his reason for being there. Deceiving them, he leaves the apartment and heads downstairs, only to find out he is going to be fired. Clara and Marcos are about to go on a trip and have to return as Clara turns out to be four weeks pregnant. Marcos is surprised as he always used a condom when they had sex.

Marcos knocks at César's place and asks him to check out Clara's apartment, stating there is a bug problem again. César goes to check the apartment but realizes that Marcos has caught onto him sneaking into her place and has found what César has been drugging her with. César and Marco begin to fight, and César grabs a piece of glass and stabs Marcos's neck, killing him. Knowing that Úrsula knows César was involved in Marcos's death, César sneaks into her apartment and threatens Úrsula to never rat him out to guarantee that he does not go to jail.

Some time later, Clara has moved out of the apartment and had her baby. César mails her a letter saying he hopes that any time she looks at their child she will think of him, and he thanks her for helping him finally be happy.

== Cast ==
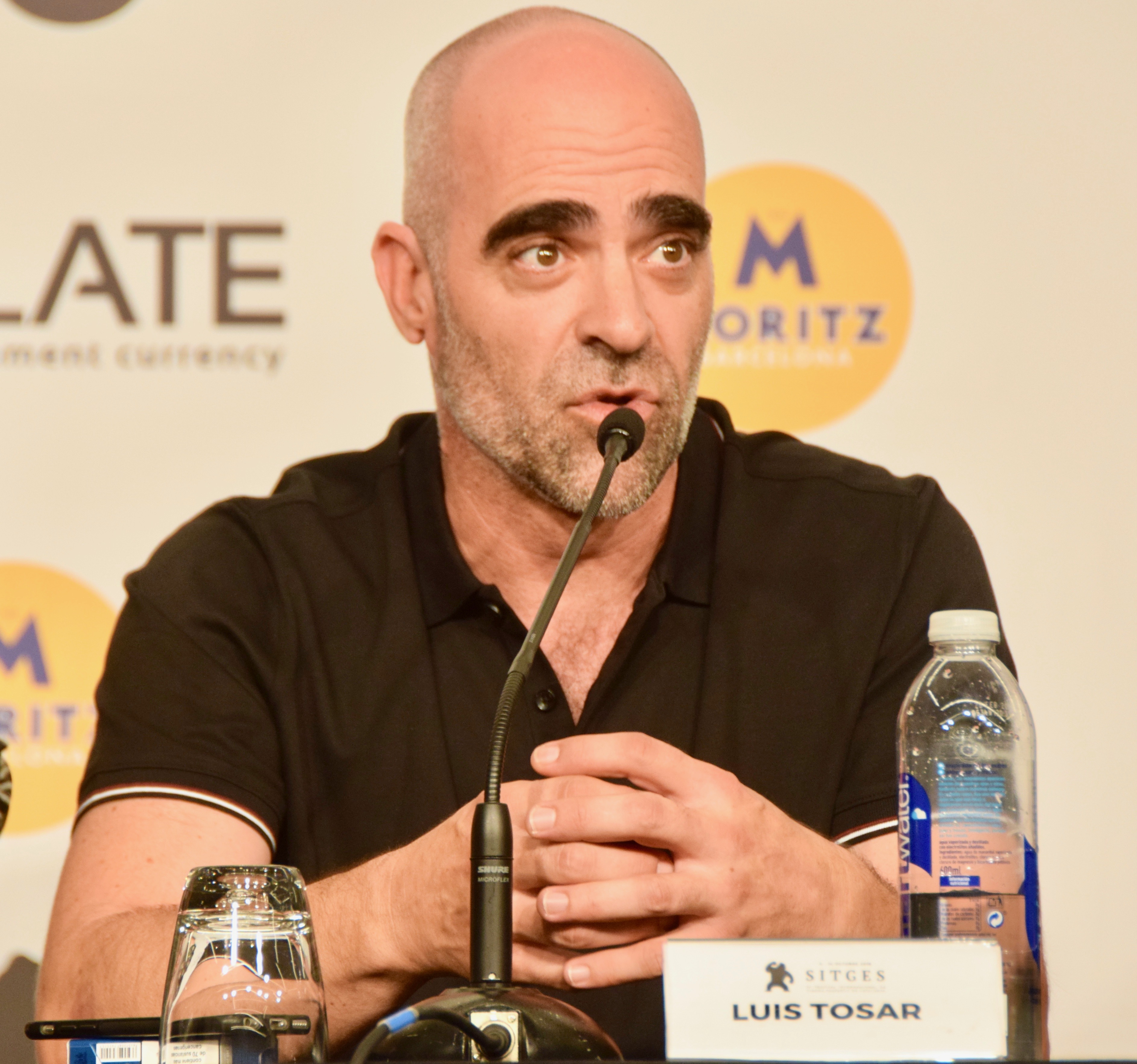
Luis Tosar at the Sitges Film Festival

- Luis Tosar as César
- Marta Etura as Clara
- Alberto San Juan as Marcos
- Pep Tosar as Úrsula's father
- Petra Martínez as Verónica
- Amparo Fernández as the cleaning lady
- Iris Almeida as Úrsula
- Roger Morilla as the cleaning boy
- Margarita Roset as César's mother
- Manel Dueso as the commissioner

== Production ==
Filmax narrated the film on the 2010 Cannes Film Festival and named Jaume Balagueró as director. Alberto Marini wrote the script of the film. Having success with the Rec film series, Balagueró felt it was important to start on something new and went on to direct Sleep Tight. The film was Balaguerós first film in which he directed but had not participated in the writing in the film but the elements of the story is what intrigued him. Balagueró stated that it was a challenge to have story in point of view of the villain and not the victim, hoping to establish a morality play that would make the audience a necessary participant. Balagueró cast in early May 2010 Luis Tosar and Marta Etura for the leads. Filmax and Balagueró filmed the project in Barcelona, Catalonia. It is Balagueró's first film since Fragile alone on the directing chair. The film had a budget of 5,000,000 Euros

=== Music ===
Lucas Vidal is the composer of the film and the score is primarily on a principal Leitmotif which are melodic or dramatic passages to correspond to the plot of the film. Vidals score was nominated to the Jerry Goldsmith Awards of 2011, in the VII International Film Music Festival. The film also features many songs such as "Next 2 You" by Buckcherry, "Keep Me In Mind" by Patti Page, "I Got To Have Your Love" by The Fantastic Four, and "I Got to Have Your Smile" by The Fantastic Four.

== Release ==
Sleep Tight had its world premiere at the Fantastic Fest in September 2011, followed by a screening at the 44th Sitges Film Festival on 8 October 2011. It was released theatrically in Spain on 14 October 2011. It hit United States theaters in 2012.

The film was made available on Video on demand in October 2012 but officially released on DVD and Blu-ray on 8 January 2013.

== Reception ==
=== Box office ===
Sleep Tight opened across 285 cinemas being in release for 80 days weeks and on opening weekend it earned $1,090,093. In Spain the film grossed $4,658,981 domestically and worldwide it grossed $8,791,590.

=== Critical response ===
The review-aggregation website Rotten Tomatoes gives the film a 94% approval rating based on 31 published reviews—a weighted average of 7.3 out of 10. The website consensus reads, "The strong lead performance, clever plot turns, and the unsettling ending makes Sleep Tight worth stalking." It has a score of 70 out of 100 on Metacritic based on 11 critics, indicating "generally favorable reviews".

Jonathan Holland of Variety had positive comments about the film stating that Sleep Tight "designed to give audience sleepless nights, and mostly succeeds". Simon Crook of Empire had similar comments to make stating that the film is "old-school, simmering with Hitchcockian suspense, but even the most hardened horror-heads will find its after-effects hard to brush off." Film Comment's Sophie Blum rated the film as a "five-star creepy stalker movie" and praises Tosar and Balagueró for having concocted a Sweeney Todd or [insert your favorite psychopath here] for the 21st century."

Manohla Dargis of The New York Times had mixed reviews claiming the chilly film works at first but that Balagueró "is so overtaken by his villain that he becomes like César, displaying an eagerness to play the role of tormentor, which kills both the movie's pleasure and its flickering political subtext."

=== Accolades ===
Year	Award	Category	Nominee(s)	Result	Ref.
2012	4th Gaudí Awards	Best Non-Catalan Language Film		Won	
2012	4th Gaudí Awards	Best Director	Jaume Balagueró	Won	
2012	4th Gaudí Awards	Best Screenplay	Alberto Marini	Won	
2012	4th Gaudí Awards	Best Actress	Marta Etura	Nominated	
2012	4th Gaudí Awards	Best Actor	Luis Tosar	Won	
2012	4th Gaudí Awards	Best Production Supervision	Teresa Gefaell, Carla Pérez de Alvéniz	Nominated	
2012	4th Gaudí Awards	Best Art Direction	Javier Alvariño	Nominated	
2012	4th Gaudí Awards	Best Supporting Actor	Alberto San Juan	Nominated	
2012	4th Gaudí Awards	Best Editing	Guillermo de la Cal	Won	
2012	4th Gaudí Awards	Best Original Score	Lucas Vidal	Nominated	
2012	4th Gaudí Awards	Best Cinematography	Pablo Rosso	Nominated	
2012	4th Gaudí Awards	Best Costume Design	Marian Coromina	Nominated	
2012	4th Gaudí Awards	Best Sound	Jordi Rossinyol, Oriol Tarragó, David Calleja	Won	
2012	4th Gaudí Awards	Best Special / Digital Effects	David Martí, Montse Ribé, Cesc Biénzobas	Nominated	
2012	4th Gaudí Awards	Best Makeup and Hairstyles	Alma Casal, Saturnino Merino	Nominated	
2012	26th Goya Awards	Best Actor	Luis Tosar	Nominated	
2012	21st Actors and Actresses Union Awards	Best Film Actress in a Minor Role	Petra Martínez	Won	

== Remake ==
In 2018, a South Korean remake of the film titled Door Lock was released. The Korean movie tells the same story from the point of view of the victim rather than the perpetrator.

== See also ==
- List of Spanish films of 2011
- List of films featuring home invasions
