= Cinema and Audiovisual School of Catalonia =

Spanish film and audiovisual school

The ESCAC - Escola Superior de Cinema i Audiovisuals de Catalunya is a Spanish film and audiovisual school. Currently located in Terrassa, the ESCAC was founded in Barcelona in 1994 as an offshoot of the vocational study programme of the Centre Calassanç. It is attached to the University of Barcelona and is currently directed by the film producer Sergi Casamitjana.

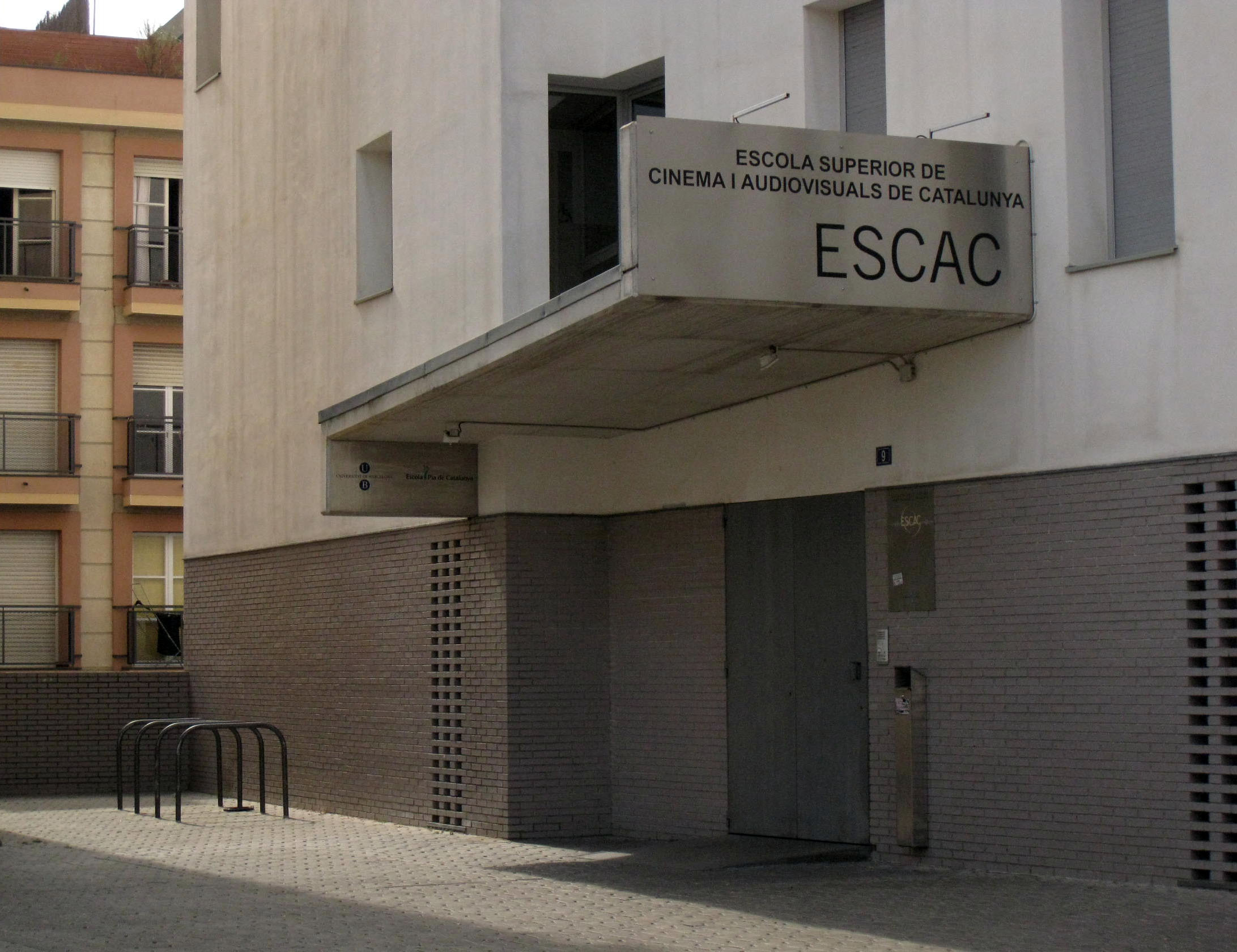
ESCAC

== History ==
Founded by Josep Maixenchs in 1993, the school began operating in 1994 when it offered a Degree in Cinema and Audiovisuals. With this initial degree it became attached to the University of Barcelona, with which it has been associated since.

It currently offers a Combined BA and MA in Cinematography, the first part of which takes place in Spain.

In 2003, the school left the Escola Pia building in Barcelona's Sarrià district and moved to the city of Terrassa.

== The school ==
The ESCAC is a private educational centre that trains professionals in different branches of cinema and the audiovisual sector. It is currently located in a building known as "La farinera" on the University Campus of Terrassa at Carrer de Colom 84-90.6 .

Its syllabus is intended to prepare students both theoretically and practically to produce audiovisual products and also provides the know-how required to market them.

Institutions such as the Academia de las Artes y de las Ciencias Cinematográficas, SGAE, and Terrassa City Council, Image Film, Luck International and the Escola Pia de Catalunya are all trustees of the not-for-profit foundation that governs the school. The centre remains in permanent and direct contact with major audiovisual industry production and services companies such as Warner Bros., El deseo and Telecinco Cinema, some of which also take part in its scholarship programme. It also has three fully equipped buildings in the university campus of Terrassa.

== Education ==
The Combined BA and MA in Cinematography is a three year-general course followed by two years’ specific study in which students can choose from the 9 specialities on offer (direction, production, photography, montage, script, sound, artistic direction, VFX and documentary). In each speciality class there are no more than 12 students.

The school also offers specific Master's courses in direction, montage, production, photography, art, animation & VFX and Film Business.

== The production company ==
In 1999, the production company Escándalo Films was founded at the ESCAC with a view to promoting work both by students and graduates. Over the years Escándalo Films has extended the areas in which it operates while maintaining its association with the ESCAC.

In 2012 Escándalo Films gave way to ESCAC Films as the production company for the work emerging from the school.

== Students ==
Since it was founded, hundreds of students from around twenty different nationalities have attended it. Noteworthy graduates include J. A. Bayona, Kike Maíllo, Óscar Faura, Mar Coll, Daniel Aranyo, Javier Ruiz Caldera, Neus Ollé, Marçal Forés, Aina Calleja, Carlos Catalán, Oriol Capel and Bet Rourich.

== Acknowledgement and awards ==
ESCAC has been named by international magazines such as The Hollywood Reporter as one of the world's best film and audiovisual schools.

Through its production companies Escándalo Films and ESCAC Films it has won over 500 international awards with the films made by its students and graduates.

The school is a member of the Cannes-based International Association of Film and Television Schools (CILECT in French).
