= Lluís Homar =

Spanish actor and theater director

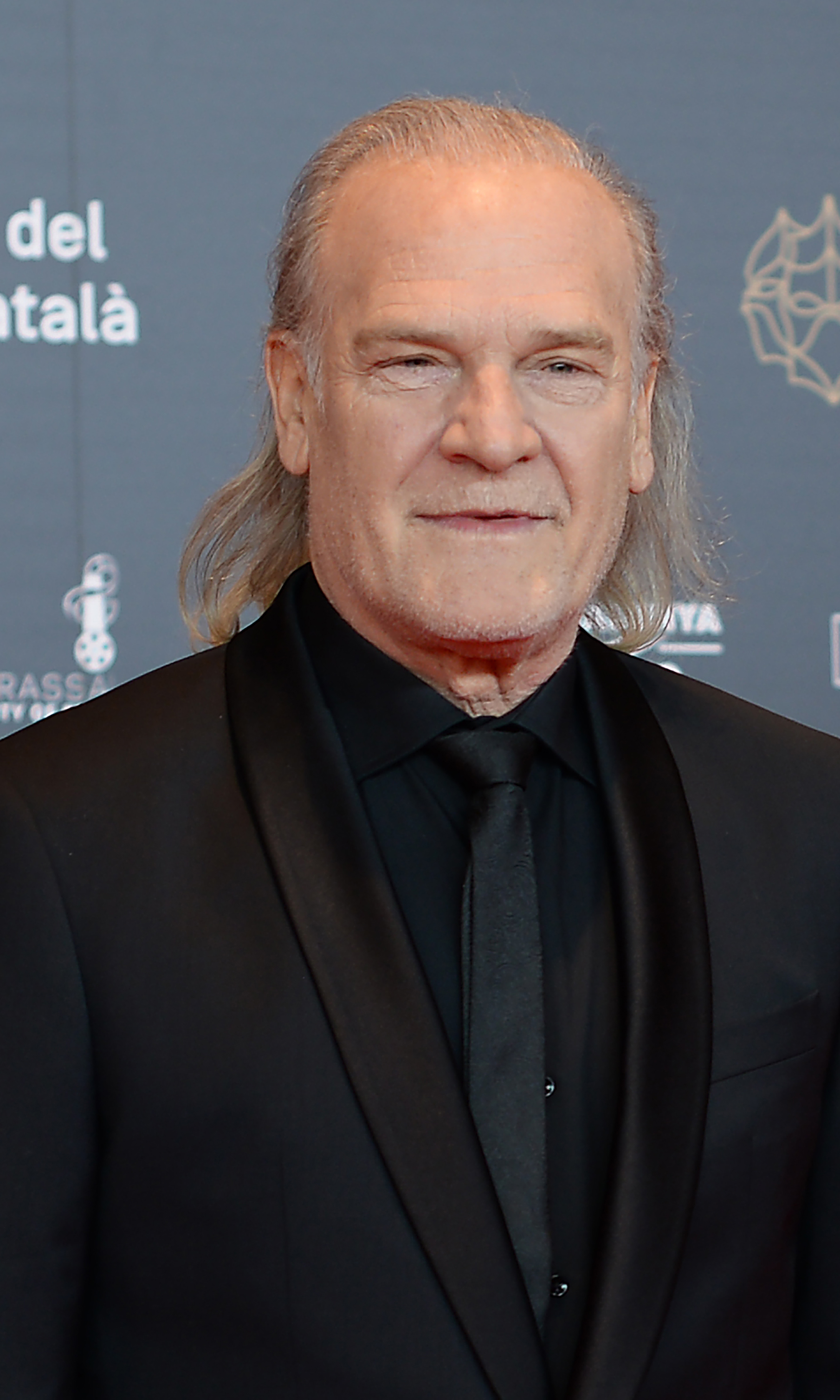
- Lluís Homar at the Gaudí Awards (2020)
- Born: Lluís Homar i Toboso; 20 April 1957 (age 69); Barcelona, Spain
- Occupation: actor
- Years active: 1974–present

Lluís Homar i Toboso (born 20 April 1957) is a Spanish actor and theater director from Barcelona. He is best known for his roles in Pedro Almodóvar's Bad Education (2004) and Broken Embraces (2009), in Emilio Aragón's Paper Birds (2010), and for his portrayal of the robot Max in Kike Maíllo's film Eva (2011).

== Biography ==
Homar was born on 20 April 1957 in Barcelona. He studied primary education at Escuelas Homar in Horta, a neighbourhood of Barcelona, and was an altar boy at the church of Sant Joan d’Horta. He studied law in the Autonomous University of Barcelona and took some courses at Institut del Teatre of Barcelona.

In 1974, he participated in a production of Othello with director Angel Carmona. A year later, he joined the theatre group Teatre del Escorpi and appeared in their plays including Terra Baixa and Quiriquibú.

In 1976, Homar joined with other actors to fund the cooperative theatre company Teatre Lliure of Barcelona, where he took part in over 30 plays and was artistic director from 1992 to 1998.

During this time, Homar also appeared in numerous TV commercials, and had minor roles in TV series such as Llibre dels fets del bon rei en Jaume (one episode) and Lletres catalanes (two episodes).

Homar finally appeared on the big screen in the 1981 film based on Mercé Rodoreda's novella The Time of the Doves, where he played the male lead opposite Silvia Munt. This was followed by roles in the films Bad Education and Broken Embraces, both directed by Pedro Almodovar, and to the lead role of pope Alejandro VI in Antonio Hernandez's film Los Borgia.

Homar's portrayal of the caring household robot Max in the sci-fi film Eva, directed by Kike Maíllo, brought him both the 2011 Goya Award and Gaudi Award for Best Supporting Actor.

He received critical acclaim for his performance as King Juan Carlos I in the Televisión Española's mini-series 23-F: El día más difícil del Rey, about the events of the 1981 Spanish coup attempt, and was also lauded for his portrayals of Roman politician and general Servio Sulpicio Galba in the Antena 3's television series Hispania, la leyenda and Imperium.

At Gijón International Film Festival in 2016, he received the Nacho Martinez Award.

Homar lives in Canet de Mar.
