= Sergi Belbel =

Spanish author and screenwriter

Sergi Belbel i Coslado
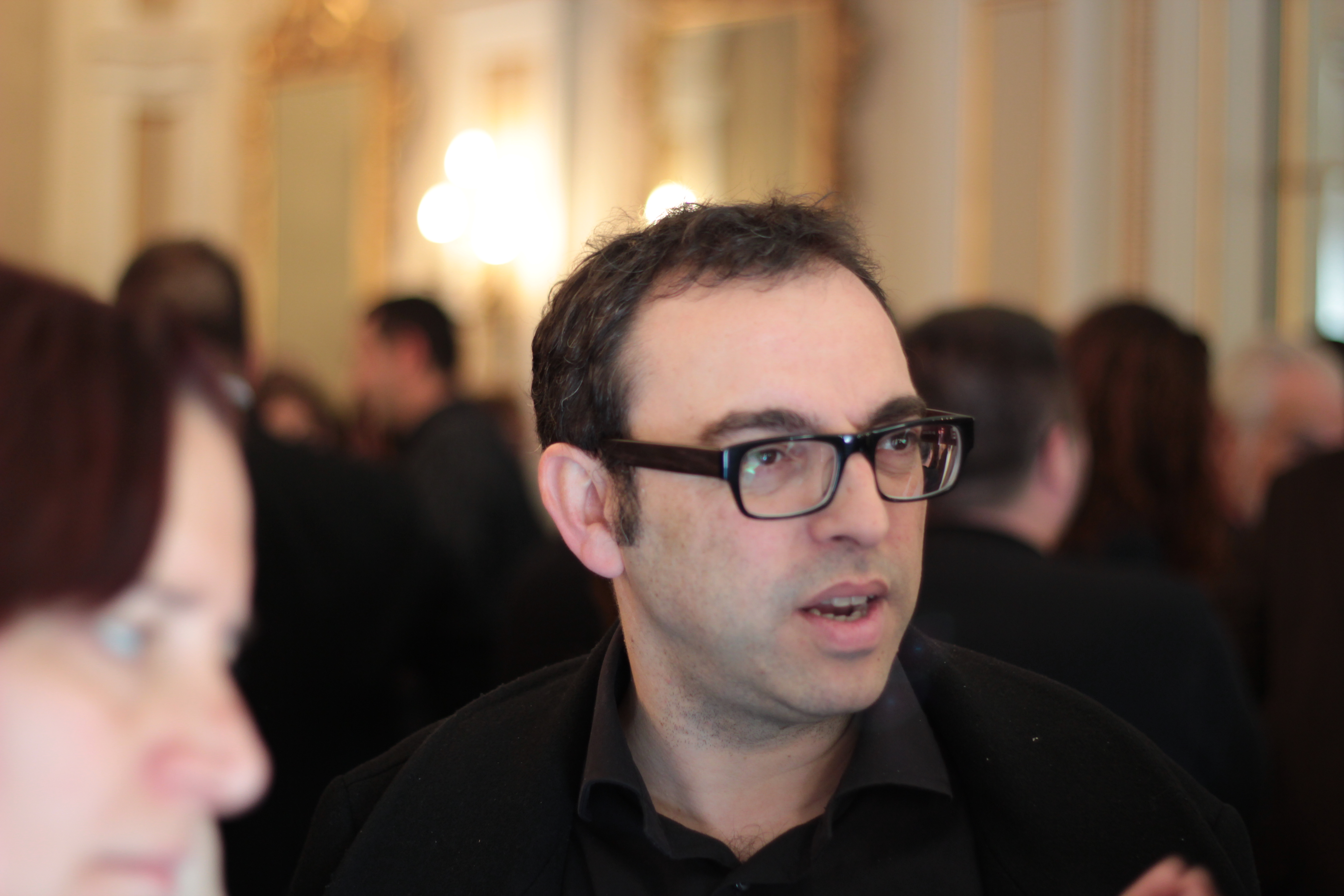
- Born: 1963 (age 62–63); Terrassa
- Occupation: playwright
- Known for: director of the Teatre Nacional de Catalunya from 2006 until 2013

Sergi Belbel i Coslado (Catalan pronunciation: [ˈsɛɾʒi βəlˈβɛl]; born 1963) is a Catalan-speaking Spanish playwright. He was the director of the Teatre Nacional de Catalunya from 2006 until 2013.

== Career ==
Born in Terrassa, Belbel's first play was Calidoscopios y faros de hoy in 1986. He became well known with his play Carícies ("Caresses") in 1992. One year later he wrote Després de la pluja ("After the rain"). In 1994 he wrote "Morir" (A moment before...). This text was awarded in 1996 with the National Dramatic Literature Award. Ventura Pons's film "Morir (o No)" (2000) was based on this play. The play Morir was staged for the first time in Greece by the company "stigmi" in 2003. In 2007 the same play was staged by the "Amfitheatriki" theatre group (University of Macedonia in Thessaloniki). In 2008 Morir was played by the theatrical team of Asoee. The play Soy fea was played by the theatrical group TADE in 2009 during the Just for your eyes festival of the Crete University. He won the Sant Jordi Prize with his debut novel, Morir-ne disset, in 2021.

== Awards ==
For 1994's act "Morir":

- Premio Borne de Theatro (1994)
- Premio Nacional de Catedra Dramatica (1996)
- Premio Nacional de Literatura Dramatica (1996)

For 2021's novel "Morir-ne disset":

- Sant Jordi Prize (2021)

== Plays ==
- Caleidoscopis i fars d'avui (1986)
- Minim-Mal Show (1987)
- Ópera (1988)
- Elsa Schneider (1989)
- En companyia d'abisme (1989)
- Tàlem (1990)
- Carícies (1992)
- Després de la pluja (1993)
- Morir (1994)
- Homes (1997)
- El temps de Plank (1999)
- Forasters (2005)
- Soy fea
- A la Toscana (2007)
- Si no t'hagués conegut (2019)

== Novels ==
- Morir-ne disset (2021)
