= Kike Maíllo =

Spanish Catalan film director and screenwriter

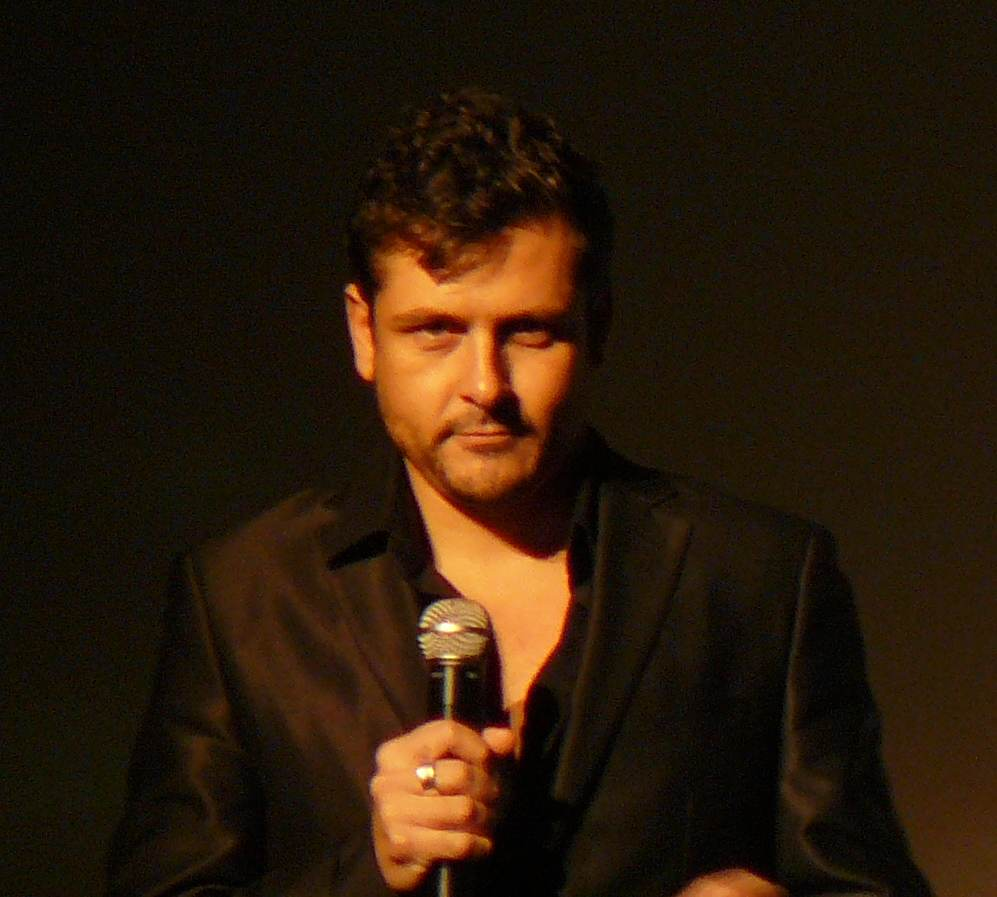
- Maíllo in Gérardmer, France
- Born: Enrique Maíllo Iznájar; 3 June 1975 (age 50); Barcelona, Spain
- Occupations: Film director; Screenwriter
- Years active: 1993-present

Enrique "Kike" Maíllo Iznájar (Catalan: [kiˈke məˈiʎu]; born 3 June 1975) is a Spanish film director and screenwriter. He is best known for Eva, which won him the 2011 Goya Award for Best New Director.

== Biography ==
From 1994 Maíllo studied at the Escola Superior de Cinema i Audiovisuals de Catalunya (ESCAC). His degree project was the short film Las cabras de Freud, with Tristán Ulloa in the lead role. Since 2000 he has taught screenwriting and directing the ESCAC.

== Filmography ==
Feature films

- Eva (2011)
- Toro (2016)
- A Perfect Enemy (2020)
