= List of Spanish films of 2011 =

A list of Spanish-produced and co-produced feature films released in Spain in 2011. When applicable, the domestic theatrical release date is favoured.

== Films ==
Release		Title (Domestic title)	Cast & Crew	Distribution label	Ref.
J A N U A R Y	5	Even the Rain (También la lluvia)	Director: Icíar Bollaín Cast: Luis Tosar, Gael García Bernal	Alta Classics	(Note: Co-production Spain–France–Mexico (70%–10%–20%).)
J A N U A R Y	5	Love Storming (No controles)	Director: Borja Cobeaga Cast: Unax Ugalde, Alexandra Jiménez, Julián López, Miguel Ángel Muñoz, Secun de la Rosa, Mariví Bilbao	Vértice 360	
J A N U A R Y	21	Neon Flesh (Carne de neón)	Director: Paco Cabezas Cast: Mario Casas, Vicente Romero, Ángela Molina, Macarena Gómez, Darío Grandinetti, Antonio de la Torre	Vértice 360	
J A N U A R Y	21	Blog	Director: Elena Trapé Cast: Alada Vila, Irene Trullén, Lidia Torrent, Sara Gómez, Lola Errando, Anna Castillo, Candela Antón	Emon	
F E B R U A R Y	4	Cousinhood (Primos)	Director: Daniel Sánchez Arévalo Cast: Quim Gutiérrez, Inma Cuesta, Raúl Arévalo, Antonio de la Torre, Adrián Lastra, Clara Lago, Nuria Gago, Alicia Rubio, Marcos Ruiz	Warner Bros. Pictures	
F E B R U A R Y	18	No Return (Sin retorno)	Director: Miguel Cohan Cast: Leonardo Sbaraglia, Martín Slipak, Bárbara Goenaga, Federico Luppi	Alta Classics	(Note: Co-production Spain–Argentina (70%–30%).)
F E B R U A R Y	23	17 Hours (23-F: La película)	Director: Chema de la Peña Cast: Paco Tous, Juan Diego, Fernando Cayo, Mariano Venancio, Ginés García Millán	Warner Bros. Pictures	
F E B R U A R Y	25	Chico & Rita	Director: Fernando Trueba, Javier Mariscal & Tono Errando	Buena Vista International	(Note: Co-production Spain–Isle of Man (66.66%–33.33%).)
F E B R U A R Y	25	Kidnapped (Secuestrados)	Director: Miguel Ángel Vivas Cast: Fernando Cayo, Manuela Vellés, Ana Wagener, Guillermo Barrientos, Dritan Biba	Vértice 360	
M A R C H	4	Ispansi (¡Españoles!)	Director: Carlos Iglesias Cast: Carlos Iglesias, Esther Regina	Alta Classics	
M A R C H	11	Torrente 4: Lethal Crisis	Director: Santiago Segura Cast: Santiago Segura, Tony Leblanc, Enrique Villén, Yon González, Javier Gutiérrez, Kiko Rivera	Warner Bros. Pictures	
M A R C H	18	Half of Oscar (La mitad de Óscar)	Director: Manuel Martín Cuenca Cast: Verónica Echegui, Rodrigo Sáenz de Heredia, Denis Eyriey, Antonio de la Torre	Golem	
M A R C H	18	Small Lives (Vidas pequeñas)	Director: Enrique Gabriel Cast: Ana Fernández, Roberto Enríquez, Alicia Borrachero, Francisco Boira, Laura Domínguez, Yohana Cobo, Ángela Molina, Emilio Gutiérrez Caba, Asunción Balaguer	Emon	
M A R C H	25	There Be Dragons (Encontrarás dragones)	Director: Roland Joffe Cast: Charlie Cox, Wes Bentley, Dougray Scott, Olga Kurylenko, Golshifteh Farahani, Ana Torrent, Alfonso Bassave, Jordi Mollà, Rodrigo Santoro, Geraldine Chaplin, Derek Jacobi, Unax Ugalde	Aurum	(Note: Co-production Spain–United States (60%–40%).)
A P R I L	1	¿Para qué sirve un oso?	Director: Tom Fernández Cast: Javier Cámara, Gonzalo de Castro, Geraldine Chaplin, Emma Suárez, Oona Chaplin	Alta Classics	
A P R I L	20	Red Eagle, the Movie (Águila Roja: la película)	Director: José Ramón Ayerra Cast: David Janer, Javier Gutiérrez, Francis Lorenzo, Inma Cuesta, Miryam Gallego, Roberto Álamo, Pepa Aniorte, Santiago Molero, Xabier Elorriaga, José Ángel Egido, Guillermo Campra, Patrick Criado, Martina Klein, Antonio Molero, Mariano Peña, Stany Coppet, William Miller, Joan Crosas	Hispano Foxfilm	
A P R I L	29	Don't Be Afraid (No tengas miedo)	Director: Montxo Armendáriz Cast: Michelle Jenner, Belén Rueda, Lluís Homar	Alta Classics	
M A Y	6	Don't Call It Love… Call It XXX (No lo llames amor... llámalo X)	Director: Oriol Capel Cast: Paco León, Kira Miró, Sophie Evans, Julián López, Javier Gutiérrez, Ana Polvorosa, Adriana Ozores	Vértice 360	
M A Y	13	Midnight in Paris	Director: Woody Allen Cast: Owen Wilson, Marion Cotillard, Rachel McAdams, Kathy Bates, Michael Sheen, Adrien Brody, Nina Arianda, Mimi Kennedy, Kurt Fuller, Carla Bruni, Léa Seydoux	Alta Classics	
M A Y	13	¿Estás ahí?	Director: Roberto Santiago Cast: Gorka Otxoa, Miren Ibarguren, Carme Elias, Miguel Rellán, Luis Callejo	Emon	
J U N E	17	Chinese Take-Away (Un cuento chino)	Director: Sebastián Borensztein Cast: Ricardo Darín, Muriel Santa Ana, Ignacio Huang	Alta Classics	
J U L Y	1	Blackthorn	Director: Mateo Gil Cast: Sam Shepard, Eduardo Noriega, Stephen Rea	Alta Classics	(Note: Co-production Spain–France–Bolivia (80%–10%–10%).)
A U G U S T	26	The Opposite of Love (Lo contrario al amor)	Director: Vicente Villanueva Cast: Hugo Silva, Adriana Ugarte, Álex Barahona, Rubén Sanz, Guadalupe Lancho, Luis Callejo, Kiti Mánver	Sony Pictures	
S E P T E M B E R	2	The Skin I Live In (La piel que habito)	Director: Pedro Almodóvar Cast: Antonio Banderas, Elena Anaya, Marisa Paredes, Jan Cornet, Roberto Álamo	Warner Bros. Pictures	
S E P T E M B E R	16	The Hidden Face (La cara oculta)	Director: Andi Baiz Cast: Quim Gutiérrez, Martina García, Clara Lago	Hispano Foxfilm	(Note: Co-production Spain–Colombia (67.44%–32.56%).)
S E P T E M B E R	23	No Rest for the Wicked (No habrá paz para los malvados)	Director: Enrique Urbizu Cast: José Coronado, Juan José Artero, Helena Miquel, Rodolfo Sancho	Warner Bros. Pictures	
O C T O B E R	7	El Capitán Trueno y el Santo Grial	Director: Antonio Hernández Cast: Sergio Peris-Mencheta, Natasha Yarovenko, Manuel Martínez, Adrián Lamana, Jennifer Rope, Gary Piquer, Asier Etxeandia, Ramón Langa, Roberto Álvarez	Buena Vista International	
O C T O B E R	7	Intruders	Director: Juan Carlos Fresnadillo Cast: Clive Owen, Carice Van Houten, Daniel Brühl, Pilar López de Ayala, Ella Purnell, Izan Corchero, Kerry Fox, Héctor Alterio	Universal Pictures	
O C T O B E R	14	Sleep Tight (Mientras duermes)	Director: Jaume Balagueró Cast: Luis Tosar, Marta Etura, Alberto San Juan	Filmax	
O C T O B E R	14	El sueño de Iván	Director: Roberto Santiago	Alta Classics	
O C T O B E R	21	The Sleeping Voice (La voz dormida)	Director: Benito Zambrano Cast: Inma Cuesta, María León, Marc Clotet, Daniel Holguín	Warner Bros. Pictures	
O C T O B E R	28	Eva	Director: Kike Maíllo Cast: Daniel Bruhl, Marta Etura, Alberto Ammann, Claudia Vega, Anne Canovas, Lluís Homar	Paramount Pictures	
N O V E M B E R	4	Verbo	Director: Eduardo Chapero-Jackson Cast: Alba García, Miguel Ángel Silvestre, Verónica Echegui, Víctor Clavijo, Macarena Gómez, Najwa Nimri	Aurum	
N O V E M B E R	11	Five Square Meters (5 metros cuadrados)	Director: Max Lemcke Cast: Fernando Tejero, Malena Alterio, Emilio Gutiérrez Caba, Manuel Morón, Secun de la Rosa	A Contracorriente Films	
N O V E M B E R	18	Los muertos no se tocan, nene	Director: José Luis García Sánchez Cast: Silvia Marsó, Carlos Iglesias, Blanca Romero, Mariola Fuentes, Carlos Álvarez-Nóvoa, Álex Angulo, Pepe Quero, Airas Bispo	Gona	
N O V E M B E R	18	Carnage (Un dios salvaje)	Director: Roman Polanski Cast: Jodie Foster, Kate Winslet, Christoph Waltz, John C. Reilly	Alta Classics	
D E C E M B E R	2	Brain Drain 2 (Fuga de cerebros 2)	Director: Carlos Therón Cast: Adrián Lastra, Alberto Amarilla, Patricia Montero, Canco Rodríguez, Pablo Penedo, Gorka Lasaosa, Paula Prendes, Juan Manuel Montilla "Langui", Loles León, Mariano Peña, Paco Tous, Antonio Dechent, David Hasselhoff	Universal Pictures	
D E C E M B E R	16	Maktub	Director: Paco Arango Cast: Diego Peretti, Aitana Sánchez-Gijón, Andoni Hernández, Goya Toledo, Rosa María Sardá, Amparo Baró, Mariví Bilbao, Enrique Villén	Warner Bros. Pictures	
D E C E M B E R	28	Paranormal Xperience 3D (XP3D)	Director: Sergi Vizcaíno Cast: Óscar Sinela, Alba Ribas, Úrsula Corberó, Amaia Salamanca, Maxi Iglesias, Luis Fernández	Sony Pictures	

== Box office ==
The ten highest-grossing Spanish films in 2011, by domestic box office gross revenue, are as follows:

Highest-grossing films of 2011
Rank	Title	Distributor	Admissions	Domestic gross (€)
1	Torrente 4: Lethal Crisis	Warner Bros. Pictures	2,630,263	19,345,503.32
2	Midnight in Paris	Alta Classics	1,239,355	7,926,916.74
3	Brain Drain 2 (Fuga de cerebros 2)	Universal Pictures	796,137	5,025,460.16
4	The Skin I Live In (La piel que habito)	Warner Bros. Pictures	722,960	4,585,877.25
5	No Rest for the Wicked (No habrá paz para los malvados)	Warner Bros. Pictures	641,445	4,039,451.98
6	Even the Rain (También la lluvia)	Alta Classics	619,315	3,901,297.53
7	Cousinhood (Primos)	Warner Bros. Pictures	566,410	3,545,363.83
8	Sleep Tight (Mientras duermes)	Filmax	546,085	3,517,590.29
9	Red Eagle, the Movie (Águila Roja: la película)	Hispano Foxfilm	502,905	3,038,709.19
10	Intruders	Universal Pictures	413,970	2,652,127.53

== See also ==
- 26th Goya Awards
