= 20th Actors and Actresses Union Awards =

2011 Spanish award ceremony

- Date: 31 October 2011
- Site: Teatro Circo Price, Madrid, Spain
- Hosted by: Pepín Tre
- Organized by: Actors and Actresses Union

Highlights
- Honorary career award: Asunción Balaguer

The 20th Actors and Actresses Union Awards ceremony was held on 31 October 2011 at the Teatro Circo Price in Madrid. The gala was hosted by Pepín Tre.

In addition to the competitive awards, the Argentine association Mothers of the Plaza de Mayo received the 'Mujeres en Unión' award, Asunción Balaguer the Toda una vida career award, and the Special Award was made to the Teatro Circo Prince (this is the recurring venue of the awards).

== Winners and nominees ==
The winners and nominees are listed as follows:

=== Film ===
Best Male Performance in a Leading Role: Javier Bardem — Biutiful; Lluís Homar — Paper Birds; Unax Ugalde — Bon appétit	Best Female Performance in a Leading Role: Sonsoles Benedicto — La vida empieza hoy; Maricel Álvarez— Biutiful; Elena Anaya — Room in Rome
Best Male Performance in a Secondary Role: Víctor Clavijo — 18 Meals; Eduard Fernández — Biutiful; Emilio Gutiérrez Caba — Small Lives	Best Female Performance in a Secondary Role: Ana Wagener — Biutiful; Alicia Borrachero — Small Lives; Fanny de Castro — Amador
Best Male Performance in a Minor Role: Antonio de la Torre — The Outlaw; Juan Diego — The Outlaw; Sancho Gracia — Entrelobos	Best Female Performance in a Minor Role: Pilar López de Ayala — The Outlaw; Goizalde Núñez — To Hell with the Ugly; Carmen Ruiz — To Hell with the Ugly

=== Television ===
Best Male Performance in a Leading Role: Javier Albalá — Pelotas; Imanol Arias — Cuéntame cómo pasó; José Mota — La hora de José Mota	Best Female Performance in a Leading Role: Adriana Ozores — La duquesa; Belén López — Pelotas; Alexandra Jiménez — La pecera de Eva
Best Male Performance in a Secondary Role: Aitor Luna — Gran Reserva; Juan Echanove — Cuéntame cómo pasó; Francis Lorenzo — Águila Roja	Best Female Performance in a Secondary Role: Ana Polvorosa — Aída; Blanca Apilánez — Pelotas; Ana Goya — Amar en tiempos revueltos
Best Male Performance in a Minor Role: Secun de la Rosa — Aída; Juan Codina — Tierra de lobos; Mario Pardo — Tierra de lobos	Best Female Performance in a Minor Role: Ana Labordeta — Acusados; Beatriz Bergamín — Amar en tiempos revueltos; Lluvia Rojo — Cuéntame cómo pasó

=== Theatre ===
Best Male Performance in a Leading Role: Carlos Hipólito — All My Sons; Pedro Casablanc — El arte de la comedia; José María Flotats — Beaumarchais	Best Female Performance in a Leading Role: Gloria Muñoz — All My Sons; Nuria Espert — La violación de Lucrecia; Concha Velasco — La vida por delante
Best Male Performance in a Secondary Role: Ginés García Millán — Glengary Glen Ross; Raúl Arévalo — Beaumarchais; Aitor Merino — El mal de la juventud	Best Female Performance in a Secondary Role: María Morales — Urtain; Carmen Conesa — Beaumarchais; Lola Cordón — Final de partida
Best Male Performance in a Minor Role: Raúl Prieto — La función por hacer; Alberto Iglesias — Glengary Glen Ross; Alberto Jiménez — Glengary Glen Ross	Best Female Performance in a Minor Role: Manuela Paso — La función por hacer; María Isasi — All My Sons; Ainhoa Santamaría — All My Sons

=== Newcomers ===
Best New Actor: Manuel Camacho — Entrelobos; Mario Casas — Los hombres de Paco; Junio Valverde — Tierra de lobos	Best New Actress: Bárbara Lennie — La función por hacer; Aura Garrido — Plans for Tomorrow; Esther Regina — Ispansi
