= Red Eagle, the Movie =

- Theatrical release poster
- Spanish: Águila Roja: La película
- Directed by: José Ramón Ayerra Díaz
- Screenplay by: Pilar Nadal; J. M. Ruiz Córdoba; Guillermo Cisneros
- Produced by: Daniel Écija
- Starring: David Janer; Javier Gutiérrez; Francis Lorenzo; Inma Cuesta; Miryam Gallego; Roberto Álamo; Pepa Aniorte; Santiago Molero; Xavier Elorriaga; José Ángel Egido; Patrick Criado; Martina Klein; Antonio Molero; Mariano Peña; Stany Coppet; William Miller; Joan Crosas
- Cinematography: Adolfo del Casar
- Edited by: Arturo Barahona
- Music by: Daniel Sánchez de la Hera
- Production companies: Globomedia; Versátil Films; Fox International Productions
- Distributed by: Hispano Foxfilm; 20th Century Fox
- Release date: 20 April 2011
- Country: Spain
- Languages: Spanish; English; Portuguese
- Budget: €7 million
- Box office: €3 million

Red Eagle, the Movie (Spanish: Águila Roja: La película) is a 2011 Spanish action adventure film, directed by José Ramón Ayerra Díaz from a screenplay by Pilar Nadal, J. M. Ruiz Córdoba, and Guillermo Cisneros. It stars David Janer as Red Eagle, reprising his role from the television series of the same name.

== Plot ==
The plot follows a thwarted conspiration involving England, Portugal, and France to dethrone Philip IV, and Gonzalo Montalvo (Red Eagle) retiring upon the blinding of son Alonso.

== Cast ==
- David Janer as Gonzalo Montalvo / Águila Roja ('Red Eagle')
- Javier Gutiérrez as Sátur
- Francis Lorenzo el comisario ('the Commissary')
- Inma Cuesta as Margarita
- Miryam Gallego la marquesa ('the Marquise')
- Roberto Álamo as Juan
- Pepa Aniorte as Catalina
- Santiago Molero as Cipri
- Xavier Elorriaga as el Rey ('the King')
- José Ángel Egido as cardenal Mendoza
- Patrick Criado as Nuño
- Martina Klein as Beatriz
- Antonio Molero as Mateo
- Mariano Peña as Antoñito
- Stany Coppet as mosquetero ('musketeer')
- William Miller as capitán inglés ('English Captain')
- Joan Crosas as Lope de Villamediana
- Guillermo Campra as Alonso

== Production ==
The film is a Globomedia and Versátil Films production. It boasted €7 million budget. Shooting locations included El Escorial, San Martín de Valdeiglesias, Navas del Rey, San Martín de la Vega, and Valsaín.

== Release ==
Hispano Foxfilm picked up theatrical and DVD distribution rights to the film in Spain. The film was released theatrically in Spain on 20 April 2011, grossing €3,074,919.

== Reception ==
Jonathan Holland of Variety considered the "mostly silly" film to be "the latest example of how Spain struggles when revisiting its own past on film".

Noel Ceballos of Fotogramas rated the film 2 out of 5 stars, citing "its stale appeal to popular patriotism" as a negative point.

== See also ==
- List of Spanish films of 2011
