= Chiamatemi Francesco =

- Directed by: Daniele Luchetti
- Screenplay by: Martín Salinas; Daniele Luchetti
- Produced by: Pietro Valsecchi
- Starring: Rodrigo de la Serna; Sergio Hernández; Mercedes Morán; Muriel Santa Ana
- Cinematography: Ivan Casalgrandi
- Music by: Arturo Cardelús
- Production companies: Taodue; Eat Movie; Mediaset
- Distributed by: Medusa Film
- Release dates: 1 December 2015 (Paul VI Audience Hall); 3 December 2015 (Italy)
- Running time: 98 minutes
- Countries: Italy; Spain
- Languages: Italian; Spanish
- Budget: 12-15 million €

Chiamatemi Francesco (Call Me Francis) is a 2015 Italian biographical film about Pope Francis directed by Daniele Luchetti.

== Plot ==
The film tells the story of the life of Pope Francis (formerly Jorge Mario Bergoglio), from his youth in Buenos Aires and his experiences under the dictatorship of Jorge Rafael Videla to his appointment as pope in 2013.

== Cast ==
- Rodrigo de la Serna as young Jorge Mario Bergoglio
- Sergio Hernández as older Jorge Mario Bergoglio
- Mercedes Morán as Esther Ballestrino
- Muriel Santa Ana as Alicia Oliveira
- Àlex Brendemühl as Franz Jalics
- Maximilian Dirr as Giovane Prete
- Andrés Gil as Father Pedro
- Marco Di Tieri as Quique

== Production ==
Upon seeing Pope Francis's first appearance on the balcony of St. Peter's Square, director Daniele Luchetti began contemplating a film about Pope Francis's life. The film's script was written by Daniele Luchetti and Martín Salinas. Luchetti has said that he aimed to avoid hagiography in the film, though it presents a generally positive portrayal of the pope. The pope did not provide guidance to the film's production team, despite their attempts to contact him. Monsignor Guillermo Karcher, a close associate of the pope, later stated that the movie was "truthful".

Luchetti joined with producer Pietro Valsecchi and Taodue to produce the movie, which was financed by Mediaset. The film was shot in Italy, Germany, and Argentina over 15 weeks. The film was shot in Spanish with an Argentine, Chilean, and Spanish cast, along with approximately 3,000 extras. The film cost 13 million euros, or approximately 14 million dollars, to produce.

The film's soundtrack was composed by Arturo Cardelús.

Writer Evangelina Himitian has claimed that the film is an illegal adaptation of her book Francis, the People's Pope (Francisco, el Papa de la gente). In March 2014, producer Pietro Valsecchi acquired an option to adapt the biography for the film; he ultimately did not exercise this option. According to Himitian, the film is nonetheless based on her research and her meetings with the film's production team. Valsecchi has denied Himitian's allegations, saying that the film is based on multiple sources and not simply her biography, and that the 40,000 euro option would have been a trivial component of the film's budget had the film in fact been based on her book. At the time Himitian made her initial allegations, she had not yet seen the film.

== Release ==
The film premiered on 1 December 2015 in the Paul VI Audience Hall, which lies across the border of Vatican City and Rome. The Office of Papal Charities determined the guest list, and all of the 7,000 tickets were distributed to the poor—including refugees and homeless people—and volunteers who serve them. Bagged dinners were given to attendees after the showing.

On 3 December, the film opened in 700 theaters across Italy. Pier Silvio Berlusconi, Maria Elena Boschi, Gianni Letta, and other Italian personalities attended the film's official presentation at Rome's The Space theater.

Medusa Film managed the film's distribution in Italy; Taodue is managing its distribution elsewhere. The film is expected to be distributed in 40 countries.

== Reception ==
During its opening weekend (3–6 December 2015), the film ranked second at the Italian box office (following In the Heart of the Sea) with 1.3 million euros in box office receipts. The same weekend, more spectators attended Chiamatemi Francesco (239,029) than In the Heart of the Sea, but In the Heart of the Sea benefited from premium prices for 3D tickets. As of 27 December 2015, the film had grossed over 3.5 million euros in Italy.

The film received generally positive reviews. Chiamatemi Francesco was named Italian Film of the Year at the Capri Hollywood Film Festival.

== Miniseries ==
The film was released in 2017 in the form of a four-part television miniseries, each lasting about 50 minutes.

== See also ==
- Francis: Pray for Me, 2015 Argentine film about Pope Francis
