= José Manuel Lorenzo =

Spanish audiovisual producer and television executive

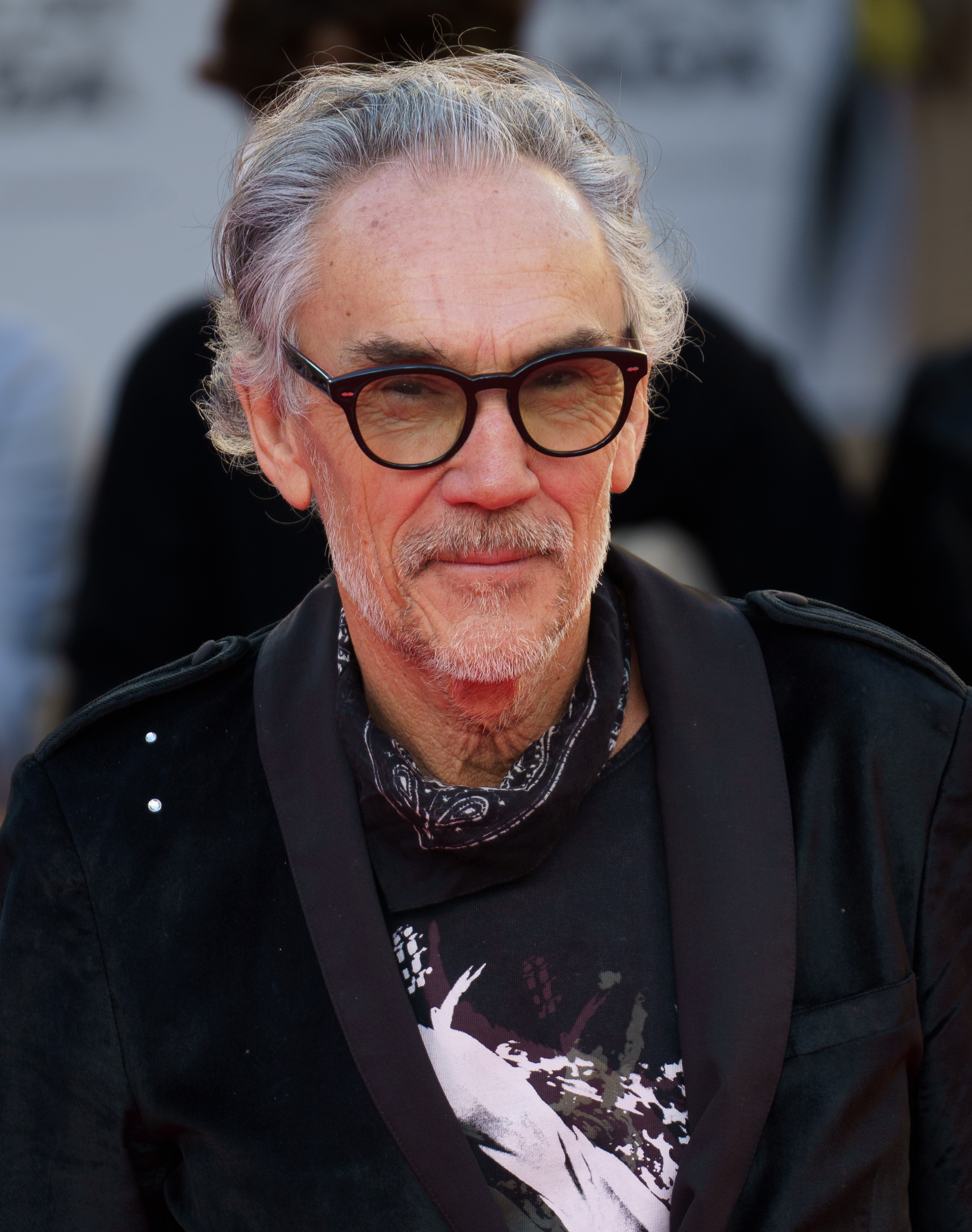
- Lorenzo in 2025
- Born: José Manuel Lorenzo Torres; 29 May 1959 (age 66); Pontevedra, Spain
- Occupations: Film producer; television producer; television executive
- Spouse: Olga Andrino
- Children: 2
- Relatives: Francis Lorenzo (brother)

José Manuel Lorenzo Torres (born 29 May 1959) is a Spanish audiovisual producer and television executive.

== Life and career ==
José Manuel Lorenzo Torres was born on 29 May 1959 in Pontevedra, to a mother and a father both working as educators. He is the brother of actor Francis Lorenzo and the husband of artist Olga Andrino, with whom he has had 2 children. He earned a title of industrial engineer from the Escuela Técnica Superior de Ingenieros Industriales in Madrid, and a master's degree in nuclear plant design from the ICAI. For a time, he worked in the Trillo Nuclear Power Plant. In 1995, he became the director general of Antena 3. From 1998 to 2004, he helmed Canal+.

He has founded several audiovisual production ventures, including Drive Televisión (2004), and DLO Producciones (2011). In 2008, he was appointed the executive chairman of Boomerang TV.
