= Amaruk Kayshapanta =

Ecuadorian actor and filmmaker

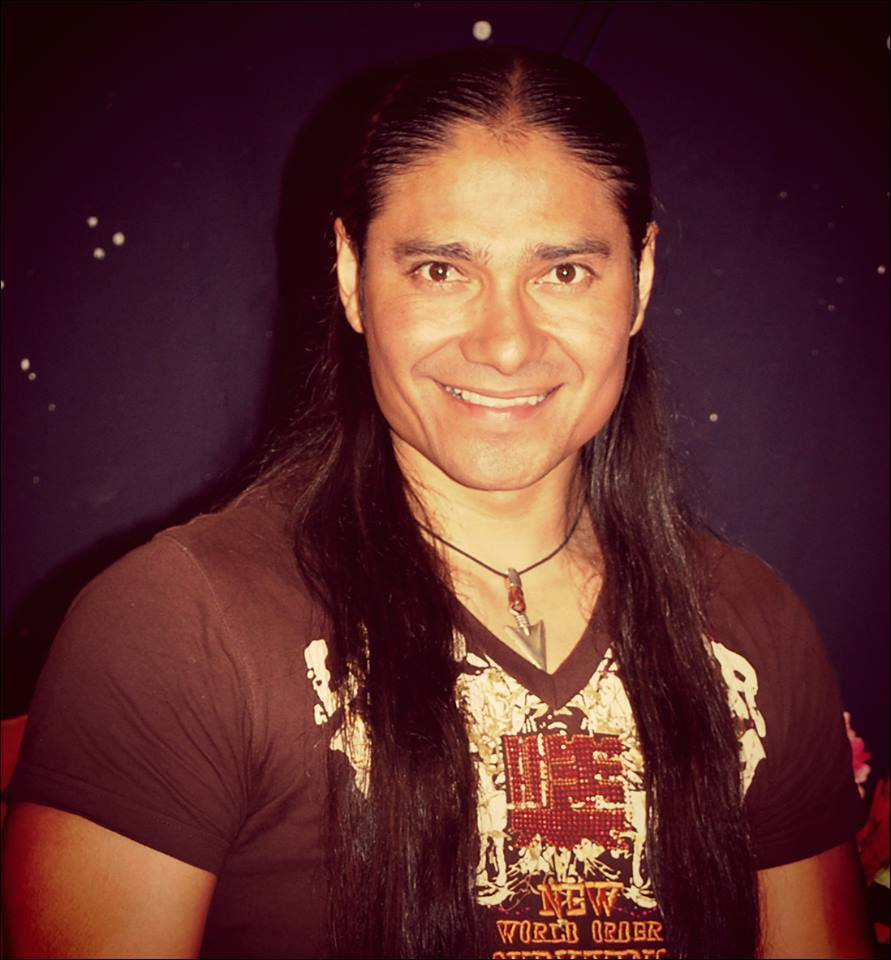
- Born: Amaruk Caizapanta Anchapacxi; January 30, 1970 (age 56); Ecuador – Quito
- Occupations: actor, filmmaker

Amaruk Kayshapanta (born Juan Carlos Caizapanta Anchapacxi, January 30, 1970, Quito, Ecuador) is an Ecuadorian actor and filmmaker. He has appeared in Spanish television series and films, including Hospital Central, Águila Roja, The Invisible Guardian (2017), and Oro (2017).

In 2022, he was among the Latin American actors awarded the Gold Medal of the Spanish Academy of Cinematic Arts and Sciences.

== Biography ==
Amaruk Kayshapanta was born on January 30, 1970, in Quito, Ecuador. In interviews, he stated that he identifies with the Kichwa Salasaca Mitimae Indigenous community.

== Career ==
Kayshapanta started acting in Spain in the 2000s. He appeared in the television series Hospital Central as Edgar.

In 2011, he appeared in Águila Roja as a Maya indigenous chief.

His film appearances include The Invisible Guardian (2017), The Legacy of the Bones (2019), and Oro (2016).

== Filmography ==
=== Television ===
- 30 Coins - The Stranger (2023)
- El nudo - Bodyguard (2020)
- Secretos_de_Estado - Shaman (2019)
- Familia – Chulo (2012)
- La Fuga – Carioco (2012)
- Águila Roja – Maya indigenous chief (2011)
- Hospital Central - Edgar (2008)
- The Heart of the City – Omar (2006)

=== Film ===
- The Legacy of the Bones (2019) – Jason Medina.
- The Invisible Guardian (2017) – Janson Medina.
- Oro (2016) – Jeromillo.
- Third Degree (2013)
- La boda (2012)
- Ayawaska (2008)
- Animales_heridos (2006)

== Publications ==
- Flor Andino (2019, Ediciones Carena)
- Amawtismo: el origen del Universo Andino (2017, Ediciones Olimpus)
- El secreto de los Amawtas (2016, Ediciones Carena)
- Memorias de un Mitimae (2014)

== Theater ==
- Fuenteovejuna (2015) – artistic director of the production, performed at Teatro Joventut, Barcelona.

== Awards and recognition ==
In 2012, Kayshapanta received the “Chasqui de Oro” in New York City.

In 2013, he was recognized as part of the 100 Latinos Madrid initiative, which highlights Latin American figures active in cultural and social fields in Spain.

In 2022, he received the Gold Medal from the Spanish Academy of Cinematic Arts and Sciences.
