= 32 Malasana Street =

- Theatrical release poster
- Spanish: Malasaña 32
- Directed by: Albert Pintó
- Written by: Ramón Campos; Gema R. Neira; Salvador S. Molina; David Orea
- Produced by: Jordi Gasull; Mercedes Gamero; Ramón Campos
- Starring: Begoña Vargas; Iván Marcos; Beatriz Segura; Sergio Castellanos; José Luís de Madariaga; Iván Renedo; María Ballesteros; Rosa Álvarez; Almudena Salort; Javier Botet
- Cinematography: Daniel Sosa Segura
- Edited by: Andrés Federico González
- Music by: Frank Montasell; Lucas Peire
- Production companies: Mr. Fields and Friends; Atresmedia Cine; Warner Bros. Entertainment España; Bambú Producciones; Malasaña Movie AIE; 4 CATS Pictures
- Distributed by: Warner Bros. Pictures
- Release date: 17 January 2020 (Spain)
- Running time: 104 minutes
- Country: Spain
- Language: Spanish

32 Malasana Street (Spanish: Malasaña 32) is a 2020 Spanish supernatural horror film directed by Albert Pintó. The cast features Begoña Vargas, Bea Segura, Iván Marcos, Sergio Castellanos and Javier Botet, among others.

== Plot ==
The fiction is set in 1976. A family from the countryside (the Olmedo family formed by Manolo, Candela, their three children and the grandfather Fermín) moves to the neighborhood of Malasaña in Madrid. Upon their arrival to their new home, they find out that they will have to endure living with a "strange presence".

== Cast ==
- Begoña Vargas as Amparo
- Iván Marcos as Manolo
- Beatriz Segura as Candela
- Sergio Castellanos as Pepe
- José Luis de Madariaga as Fermín
- Iván Renedo as Rafita
- María Ballesteros as Lola
- Rosa Álvarez
- Almudena Salort
- Javier Botet
- Concha Velasco

== Production ==
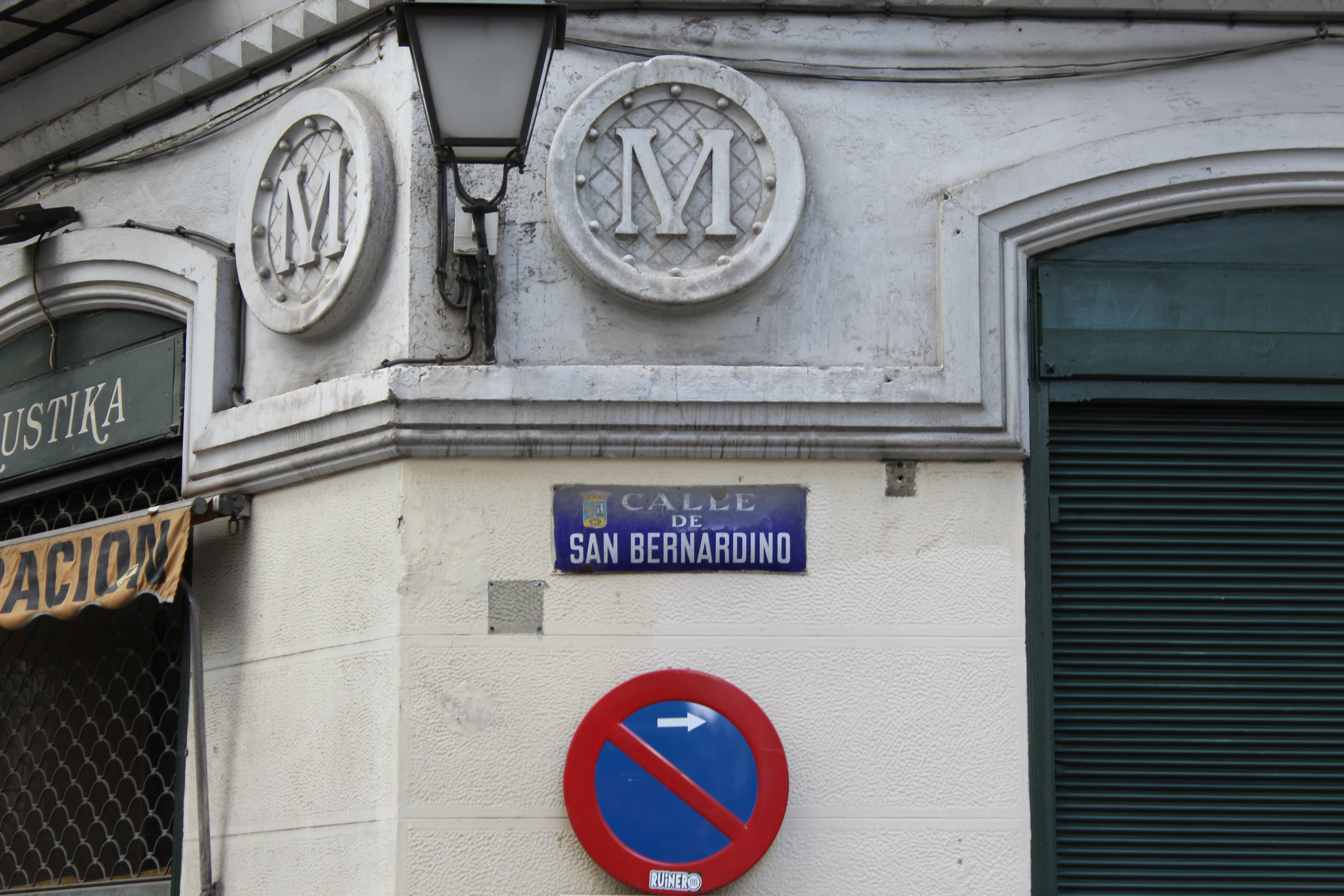
The façade of the Calle de San Bernardino was used for footage.

The screenplay was penned by Ramón Campos, Gema R. Neira, Salvador S. Molina, and David Orea. The film was produced by Mr. Fields and Friends, Atresmedia Cine, Warner Bros. Entertainment España, Bambú Producciones, Malasaña Movie AIE and 4 CATS Pictures.

A prime shooting location was a building in Calle de San Bernardino 3, Madrid (32 Malasaña Street does not exist, Calle de Malasaña actually ends at 30), which has also hosted part of the filmings of Witching & Bitching, May God Save Us and Don't Blame the Karma for Being an Idiot, among others.

Shooting had already wrapped in September 2019.

== Release ==
Distributed by Warner Bros., the film was theatrically released in Spain on 17 January 2020.

== Reception ==
Eulàlia Iglesias of El Confidencial gave the film 2 out of 5 stars. She wrote that the film "does not delve into its metaphorical potential" and it ends up relying too much on "cheap scares". She also considered that the ending goes off-rail and that Concha Velasco does not seem to believe in the role she is playing.

Pablo Vázquez of Fotogramas gave it 3 out of 5 stars, considering the film to be "an honest collection of scares", although he missed some dark humour in the film.

Among genre tropes and cliches galore, Javier Ocaña of El País wrote that some distinctive features can be discerned (related to the production design, costumes and some social details making nods to the era the film is set in). He deemed the last half hour to be "great".

Raquel Hernández Luján of HobbyConsolas gave it 68 out of 100 points ("acceptable"), praising the cast, the production design and sound production, whilst negatively assessing the "ridiculous" ending, the abuse of jumpscares and the plot's lack of internal logic.

On the review aggregator website Rotten Tomatoes, 43% of 23 critics' reviews are positive, with an average rating of 5.4/10. The website's consensus reads: "It initially appears to be a promising destination for horror fans, but Malasaña 32 ultimately houses little more than repackaged ghost story clichés."

== See also ==
- List of Spanish films of 2020
