= Semana Santa (2002 film) =

Semana santa
- Directed by: Pepe Danquart
- Written by: David Hewson novel Roy Mitchell; Screenplay
- Produced by: Paul Berrow; Philippe Guez
- Starring: Alida Valli; Mira Sorvino; Olivier Martinez
- Cinematography: Ciro Cappellari
- Edited by: Peter R. Adam; Joëlle Hache
- Music by: Andrea Guerra
- Distributed by: Tobis StudioCanal (Germany); Pathé Distribution (United Kingdom); Gaumont Buena Vista International (France); Istituto Luce (Italy)
- Release date: 24 April 2002
- Running time: 89 minutes
- Countries: Germany; United Kingdom; France; Italy; Denmark; Spain
- Language: English

Semana santa (also known as Angel of Death) is a 2002 European mystery thriller film directed by Pepe Danquart. It is notable for its international cast including Mira Sorvino and Alida Valli in her final film appearance.

== Plot ==
During the Spanish Civil War the 14-year-old Doña Catalina (Yohana Cobo) is captured by war criminal Antonio Alvarez. She is forced to witness how her father is murdered with a traditional bullfighting weapon known as „rejón de muerte“. Following that her father's murderer rapes her. After this traumatic experience she can get hold of a knife and attempts to take revenge. But she is grabbed by one of Alvarez' accomplices who also tries to abuse her. She stabs him and escapes. A friendly couple saves her. Doña Catalina recovers but turns out being pregnant. The birth is difficult and the couple tells Doña her boy had died. Later they disappear and take the allegedly dead boy with them.

The war criminal who raped her remains unpunished. More than that, after the war he gets more and more powerful as a local politician. He keeps on befathering teenage girls, always getting away by making presents and paying child support. Yet a Christian brotherhood expels him.

Forty years later, during the Semana Santa, again people get killed in the same manner Alvarez once murdered Doña's father. Police detective Quemada and his new colleague Maria Delgado try to find a trace. They interview the leader of a Christian brotherhood and later on an expert for bullfighting. Finally it is revealed that the late Antonio Alvarez had advised his illegitimate sons to stick together and had hereby created a still existing network.

The sons believe they had to get back at their father's former enemies. Doña's lost son is on top of this conspiracy. As a high-ranked local policeman he is a superior of Quemada and Delgado. In order to oppress the truth he doesn't hesitate to kill his subordinates or even his half-brothers.

In the end Doña saves Maria Delgado's life by firing a gun at her lost son.

== Cast ==
- Alida Valli as Doña Catalina
- Yohana Cobo as young Doña Catalina
- Mira Sorvino as Maria Delgado
- Olivier Martinez as Inspector Quemada
- Féodor Atkine as Inspector Torillo
- Peter Berling as Castaneda
- Fermi Reixach as Captain Rodriguez
- Luis Tosar as Antonio Alvarez

== Reception ==
Critics occasionally found the film adaptation of David Hewson's novel Santa Semana not completely logical.
