= Begoña Vargas =

Spanish actress, dancer and model

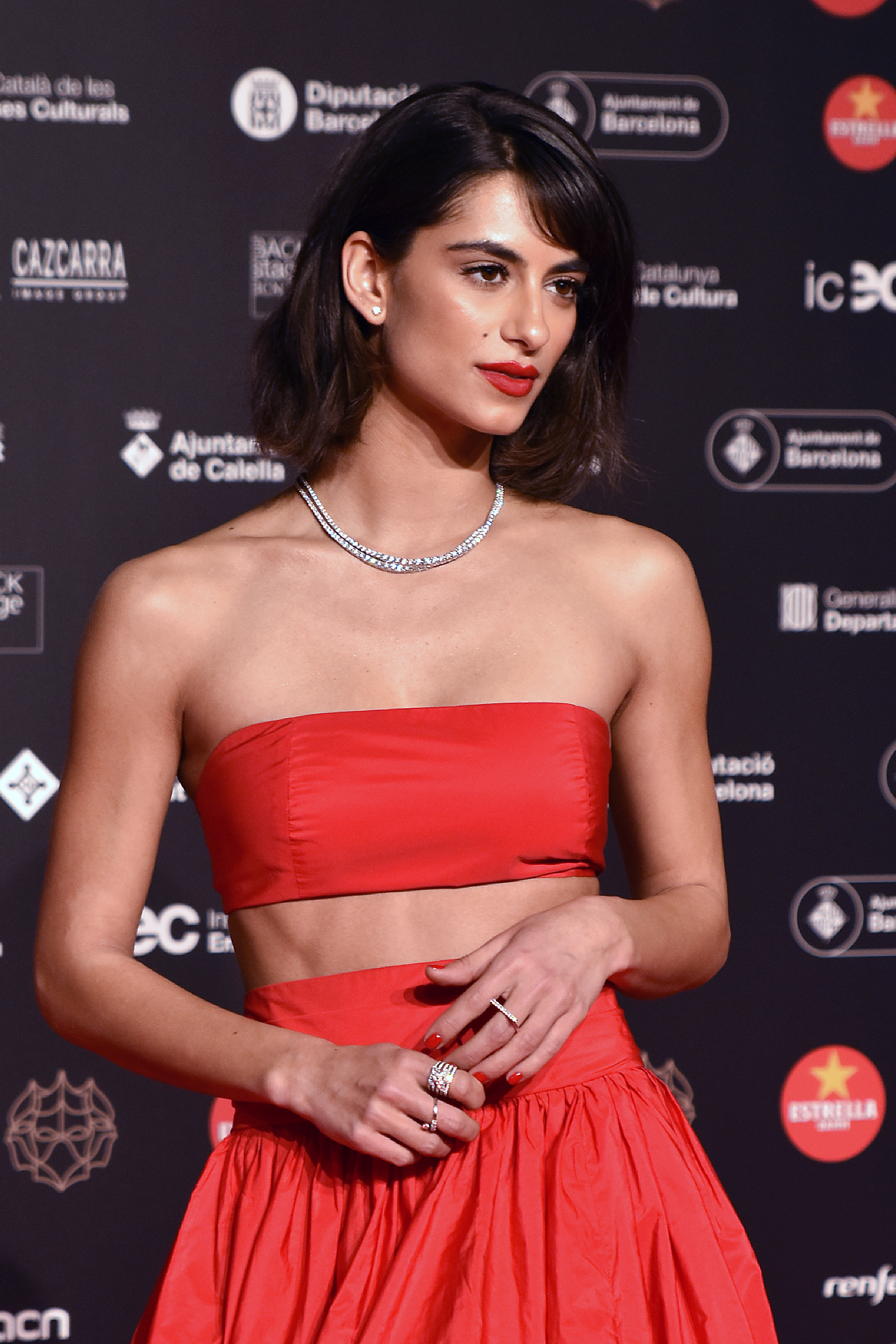
- At the 14th Gaudí Awards in 2022
- Born: 18 December 1999 (age 26); Madrid, Spain
- Occupations: Actress, dancer

Begoña Vargas (born 18 December 1999) is a Spanish actress and dancer.

== Biography ==
Begoña Vargas was born in Madrid on 18 December 1999. At age 10, she started studies at a dance school in Loeches, after which she also began to train her acting chops. While Vargas made her television debut by playing a guest role in Centro Médico and also performed in Paquita Salas, she had her television breakthrough role in La otra mirada. She ensuingly landed main roles in Boca Norte and High Seas. She made her feature film debut with a performance in the 2020 horror film 32 Malasana Street. In 2020, she joined the casts of Daniel Monzón's Outlaws (starring alongside Marcos Ruiz and Chechu Salgado) and Daniel Calparsoro's Centauro (starring alongside Carlos Bardem and Àlex Monner). In 2021, she joined the casts of the Netflix series Welcome to Eden and the second season of the Movistar+ fantasy series Paradise.

== Filmography ==
=== Film ===
Year	Title	Role	Notes	Ref
2020	Malasaña 32 (32 Malasana Street)	Amparo		
2021	Las leyes de la frontera (Outlaws)	Tere		
2022	Centauro	Natalia		

=== Television ===
Year	Title	Role	Notes	Ref.
2018	La otra mirada (A Different View)	Roberta		
2019	Boca Norte	Andrea	Main	
2019	Alta mar (High Seas)	Verónica de García	Main	
2022–2023	Bienvenidos a Edén (Welcome to Eden)	Bel	Main	
2022	Paraíso (Paradise)	Evelyn	Main. Introduced in Season 2	
2023–present	La casa de papel: Berlín (Money Heist: Berlin)	Cameron	Main	

== Accolades ==
Year	Award	Category	Work	Result	Ref.
2022	14th Gaudí Awards	Best Actress	Outlaws	Nominated	
2022	30th Actors and Actresses Union Awards	Best New Actress	Outlaws	Nominated	
2022	72nd Fotogramas de Plata	Best Film Actress	Outlaws	Nominated	
