= The Contestant (2007 film) =

- Theatrical release poster
- Spanish: Concursante
- Directed by: Rodrigo Cortés
- Screenplay by: Rodrigo Cortés
- Produced by: Gonzalo Salazar-Simpson; Xavier Villaverde
- Starring: Leonardo Sbaraglia; Chete Lera; Miryam Gallego; Fernando Cayo; Miriam de Maeztu; Luis Zahera
- Cinematography: David Azcano
- Edited by: Guillermo Represa; Rodrigo Cortés
- Music by: Víctor Reyes
- Production companies: Lazona Films; Continental Producciones; Nephilim Producciones; Filmax
- Distributed by: Filmax
- Release dates: 11 March 2007 (Málaga); 16 March 2007 (Spain)
- Country: Spain
- Language: Spanish

The Contestant (Spanish: Concursante) is a 2007 Spanish black comedy film written, co-edited and directed by Rodrigo Cortés in his directorial debut feature. It stars Leonardo Sbaraglia.

== Plot ==
Martín Circo Martín is a lecturer on economic history who wins the biggest prize ever (a set of prizes valued in €3 million) in a television game show in Spain, only to find out that the tax authorities want to keep a large part of the prize and he has no way to pay off his debts.

== Cast ==
- Leonardo Sbaraglia as Martín Circo Martín
- Miryam Gallego as Laura
- Luis Zahera as Pizarro
- Chete Lera as Edmundo Figueroa
- Myriam de Maeztu as Carmen Santillana
- Fernando Cayo as Eloy

== Production ==
The film was produced by Lazonafilms, Continental, Nephilim Producciones, and Filmax and it had the participation of TVE and TVG. Shooting locations included A Coruña.

== Release ==
The film screened at the 10th Málaga Film Festival on 11 March 2007. Distributed by Filmax, it was released theatrically in Spain on 16 March 2007.

== Reception ==
Jonathan Holland of Variety considered that Cortés "fails to take the premise anywhere interesting, but the pic has a madcap, contempo energy that could find it offshore fans".

Pere Vall of Fotogramas rated the film 3 out of 5 stars, highlighting an electric performance by Sbaraglia as the best thing about the film.

== Accolades ==
Year	Award	Category	Nominee(s)	Result	Ref.
2008	22nd Goya Awards	Best Original Song	"Circus Honey Blues" by Víctor Reyes, Rodrigo Cortés	Nominated	
2008	6th Mestre Mateo Awards	Best Film		Nominated	
2008	6th Mestre Mateo Awards	Best Director	Rodrigo Cortés	Nominated	
2008	6th Mestre Mateo Awards	Best Screenplay	Rodrigo Cortés	Nominated	
2008	6th Mestre Mateo Awards	Best Actor	Leonardo Sbaraglia	Nominated	
2008	6th Mestre Mateo Awards	Best Supporting Actor	Luis Zahera	Won	
2008	6th Mestre Mateo Awards	Best Supporting Actor	Chete Lera	Nominated	
2008	6th Mestre Mateo Awards	Best Editing	Guillermo Represa, Rodrigo Cortés	Won	
2008	6th Mestre Mateo Awards	Best Sound	Sergio Burman, Charlie Schmucler, Fran Gude	Nominated	

== See also ==
- List of Spanish films of 2007
