= Boca Norte =

Spanish television series

- Genre: Teen drama
- Created by: Eva Mor
- Screenplay by: Eva Mor; Miguel Ibáñez; Eva Baeza
- Directed by: Dani de la Orden; Elena Trapé
- Starring: Begoña Vargas; David Solans; Marina Castro; Guillermo Lasheras; Jasmine Roldán; Júlia Creus; Guillermo Campra
- Country of origin: Spain
- Original language: Spanish
- No. of seasons: 1
- No. of episodes: 6

Production
- Executive producers: Eugenio Saavedra; Carlos Mochales; Agustín Alonso; Rubén Mayoral
- Running time: 18–25 min
- Production companies: RTVE; Lavinia Audiovisual

Original release
- Network: playz
- Release: 23 January 2019

Boca Norte is a Spanish drama streaming television series created by Eva Mor for Playz. Produced by RTVE in collaboration with Lavinia Audiovisual and directed by Dani de la Orden and Elena Trapé, it stars Begoña Vargas, David Solans, Marina Castro, Guillermo Lasheras, Jasmine Roldán, Júlia Creus and Guillermo Campra. It was released in January 2019.

== Premise ==
Set in Barcelona, the fiction tracks Andrea, a well-off girl who have just arrived to a poor neighborhood. Upon her arrival, she is forced by her father to join a cultural centre, "Boca Norte", where she meets new people with a penchant for trap music and dance. It deals with themes such as bisexuality and the dependence on social media.

== Cast ==
- Begoña Vargas as Andrea.
- David Solans as Dani.
- Guillermo Lasheras as Andy.
- Jasmine Roldán as Sarah.
- Júlia Creus as Katy.
- Marina Castro as Maria.
- Guillermo Campra as DJ Lu.

== Production and release ==
Created by Eva Mor, the series was produced by RTVE in collaboration with Lavinia Audiovisual for RTVE's streaming platform Playz. The screenplay was written by Eva Baeza together with Miguel Ibáñez, whereas the episodes were directed by Dani de la Orden and Elena Trapé. Eugenio Saavedra, Carlos Mochales and Agustín Alonso were credited as executive producers on behalf of RTVE whereas Rubén Mayoral was credited as executive producer on behalf of Lavinia Audiovisual. Shooting began in July 2018 in Barcelona. In November 2018, the series was pre-screened at the Zoom Festival in Igualada. Playz released the 6-episode season on 23 January 2019.

No.	Title	Directed by	Written by	Original release date
1	"Capítulo 1"	Dani de la Orden	Eva Mor, Miguel Ibáñez & Eva Baeza	23 January 2019
2	"Capítulo 2"	Dani de la Orden	Eva Mor, Miguel Ibáñez & Eva Baeza	23 January 2019
3	"Capítulo 3"	Dani de la Orden	Eva Mor, Miguel Ibáñez & Eva Baeza	23 January 2019
4	"Capítulo 4"	Elena Trapé	Eva Mor, Miguel Ibáñez & Eva Baeza	23 January 2019
5	"Capítulo 5"	Elena Trapé	Eva Mor, Miguel Ibáñez & Eva Baeza	23 January 2019
6	"Capítulo 6"	Elena Trapé	Eva Mor, Miguel Ibáñez & Eva Baeza	23 January 2019

== Awards ==
Year	Award	Category	Nominee(s)	Result	Ref.
2019	66th Ondas Awards	Best Streaming Content		Won	
