= Olga Andrino =

Spanish painter and sculptor

Olga Andrino Diego
- Born: Burgohondo, Ávila
- Education: Universidad Complutense de Madrid

Olga Andrino Diego (Burgohondo, Ávila) is a Spanish painter and sculptor.

== Biography ==
Andrino's childhood was spent in the city of Madrid. She lived in Ibiza, London and Madrid. She studied fine art in Universidad Complutense de Madrid and she has the doctorate of sculpture.

Andrino's art has come to America, working with galleries of Valliart, in Miami. She was also selected by her alma mater, along with three other artists, to represent the University at the College of Spain in Paris (Quatre Peinture et sculpture).

== Style ==
Andrino use different materials for her works, among which may be mentioned paper mache, cement, sand, cardboard, wood and iron, among others.

For six years her work has addressed the issue of the crowds, human groups and what areas they occupy. This has produced a dramatic piece of art, because the fact that it has human content also makes this dramatic content. It also delves into the world of words. The artist defines her work saying that the sculpture is pictorial and sculptural painting and the painting is first and second is relief.

The predominant color in her works is red, which purports to represent the drama of the crowds on a sea of white. This color, red, has been key to the life of Andrino, it has touched many aspects of her life. According to her, it is the color that gives coherence to their works, acts as a wire and you could say that is the hallmark of the artist herself, that is, the color that characterizes her works. The artist is moved by emotions and sees the red like one of them, giving a fiery and blood symbolism. The material often used in her sculpture is cement, but also uses sand. For her, these materials give a telluric aspect of her work and the link to the summers of her childhood in the home of her grandparents, representing humility. Her sculptures are of a large size, full scale.

In all aspects of her work is the theme of childhood. Cement represents the playground and park, where children have fun together and learn traditional games. These sculptures represent the public space, the place where children should have fun freely. Childhood is a key theme in her work because it is the first period of life, which is appropriate, and that marks adulthood as Andrino.

The main influential painter and sculptor in her work is the German neo-expressionist Anselm Kiefer, who got the idea of large volumes. Andrino considers that the sculptures of large volumes should be exposed in large public platforms and establishes a direct correlation size / expression, that is, to express great feelings, emotions and sensations need to do it through large sculptures to be exhibited in large spaces.

== List of exhibitions ==
- 1994-1996 - Works in various NGOs. Collaborate in 'To help', a collective circle of Fine Arts in Madrid helping to Doctors Without Borders, and 'Art in cooperation and development', for the benefit of Manos Unidas. She was also selected in the first Uniplublic Sports Painting Contest.
- 1998 - She is selected for the exhibition Recorders 98 held in the Exhibition Hall of the Faculty of Fine Arts of the Complutense University.
- 2000 - Arc 2000 Levy Gallery Madrid and Hamburg. Exhibition 'Territory of art, modern and contemporary painters'. She was selected in the second Todisa Painting Prize.
- 2000-2001 - Made a single collection of painting and sculpture for the Madrid-Hamburg Levy Gallery. 'BOXES 2000-2001', an exhibition that is based on the theory of Wittgenstein, which addresses the relationships between simple objects and composite objects and atomic facts. Also in this period, it contributes to collective collection 'Generational Meetings' in the Gallery Jorge Ontiveros. Andrino was again selected in the Third Prize for Painting Todisa.
- 2002 - Helps with the exhibition 'New Visions' Arteara Gallery in Madrid and in the 'Other Meninas', held in various cities of the Spanish geography, namely: Cultural Hall Caixa Galicia in Santiago de Compostela, Mediterranean Headquarters Media in Valencia, Kubo-Kutxaespacio Art Hall in San Sebastian, Cultural Center in Granada General Exhibition Hall and University of Malaga. It was also in this year when she was selected by the Complutense University of Madrid to represent this organization at the College of Spain in Paris ("Quatre" Peinture et sculpture). Also performs solo show 'Simple objects' in the Madrid Gallery Room XIII. She was selected for the third time for the Fourth Todisa Painting Prize.
- 2003 - Group exhibition 'Prelude Four' of sculpture and painting in Madrid Gallery Room XIII. Her work on the Meninas set forth in Montevideo, Uruguay and between June and July this year set out in the National Museum of Fine Arts in Buenos Aires, Argentina.
- 2004 - Participated in the 'Fashion Art' project exposed in April and May in Los Condes, Santiago, Chile, in June exposed at the Museum of Antioquia, Medellin and in August at the Museum of the Tertulia in Cali, Colombia. The 'Fashion Art' project discussed in Cartagena de Indias between November 2004 and January 2005. Andrino participated in the exhibition 'ActivArte' in Barcelona with her piece '10 Years Project '.
- 2005 - Performed a solo exhibition "Other Spaces' Gallery in Room XIII. Exposed along with the artist from Belgium in Bethlehem Herbosh Carlos Antwerp Foundation in Madrid.
- 2006 - Solo exhibition 'A blue space' in the Club Diario de Ibiza, Ibiza. Solo exhibition 'El Patio' at the White Soto Art Gallery Madrid, Spain.
- 2008 - Collaborated with group exhibition 'Interference' in the workshop of Salt, Las Salinas, Ibiza.
- 2011 - Together with Josemi Carmona makes the musical-pictorial project 'Dinner for Two'. In the international art fair in Madrid Phoenix hotel participates with his piece 'Alatriste', a statement from her gallery of Biondetta Biondetta Bethlehem Art Gallery. Solo exhibition "A world of today: The crowd" in Biondetta Art Gallery, Madrid, Spain.
- 2012 - Participated in the exhibition '25 Years of Spanish Fashion' at the Cerralbo Museum in Madrid with her play 'Red Carpet'.
- 2013 - Solo exhibition 'A world of today' in the Galileo Cultural Center of Madrid. She selected by the International Development Bank for a solo exhibition 'Crowds' in its EA DIB Art Gallery, Washington DC, and 'Crowds / Crowds' at the Cervantes Institute in New York.

== Works ==
- 2008 - The Salt
- 2009 - A world today: the crowd
- 2009 - Crowd
- 2010 - Alatriste
- 2010 - Spain / Tasting: evening with 5 bottles of wine,
- 2010 - Spain
- 2010 - Siesta in Afghanistan
- 2010 - The look of Ibiza to Formentera / Children playing on the shore
- 2011 - Crowds
- 2011 - Unemployment Office
- 2012 - The red carpet
- 2012 - Madrid
- 2012 - A city in America, New York
- 2013 - Crowd in the plaza
- 2013 - Crowds I, II, III and IV
- 2013 - The attraction of the abyss
- 2013 - Goodbye
- 2013 - Towards somewhere
- 2013 - To the temple
- 2013 - Diaspora
- 2013 - Nam Myoho Renge kyo
- 2013 - Library
- 2013 - In the museum
