= Instinto (TV series) =

- Genre: Erotic thriller
- Created by: Teresa Fernández-Valdés; Ramón Campos; Gema R. Neira
- Directed by: Carlos Sedes; Roger Gual
- Starring: Mario Casas
- Country of origin: Spain
- Original language: Spanish
- No. of seasons: 1
- No. of episodes: 8

Production
- Running time: 50 min (approx.)
- Production company: Bambú Producciones

Original release
- Network: Movistar+
- Release: 10 May 2019

Instinto (lit. 'Instinct') is a Spanish erotic thriller television series starring Mario Casas. Created by Teresa Fernández-Valdés, Ramón Campos and Gema R. Neira and produced by Bambú Producciones for Movistar+, it was released on 10 May 2019.

== Premise ==
Marco Mur (Mario Casas) is a successful businessman, the CEO of ALVA, a tech company about to launch an innovative prototype of electric car, in which he works together with his friend Diego (Jon Arias) and Bárbara (Bruna Cusí). A newcomer, the ambitious Eva (Silvia Alonso), joins the company. Marco is however introverted and emotionally blocked. Dependent on his psychologist Sara (Miryam Gallego), Marco's only mental escape routes are sport and a private club where members receive sexual pleasure and give free rein to their erotic fantasies.

Marco has an autistic younger brother, José (Óscar Casas), (Note: Óscar Casas is the real-life brother of Mario Casas.) interned in a specialized center where the only person able to connect with him is Carol (Ingrid García-Jonsson).

== Cast ==
- Mario Casas as Marco Mur.
- Ingrid García-Jonsson as Carol Majó, José's therapist.
- Silvia Alonso as Eva Vergara, an ambitious engineer and newcomer to Alva.
- Miryam Gallego as Sara Ortuño, a psychologist treating Marco.
- Jon Arias as Diego Bernal, Marco's friend and business partner.
- Bruna Cusí as Bárbara Robles, Diego's wife and Alva's marketing director.
- Óscar Casas as José Mur, Marco's autistic brother.
- Elvira Mínguez as Doctora Villegas, the director of the centre José is interned in.
- Lola Dueñas as Laura, Marco and José's mother.
- Juan Diego Botto as Pol Garrido, a peculiar psychologist.

== Production and release ==
Produced by Bambú Producciones, the series was created by Ramón Campos, Teresa Fernández-Valdés and Gema R. Neira, whereas Carlos Sedes and Roger Gual directed the episodes.

The series was shot in 2018. A former weapons factory in Guadalajara was repurposed as the premises of ALVA, the lead character's company. The Palacio de Fernán Núñez in Madrid was used to recreate the club. Mataelpino, in the Sierra de Guadarrama, was another shooting location.

The series, consisting of 8 episodes with a running time of about 50 min, was released on Movistar+ on 10 May 2019. The supporting performance of Óscar Casas (rather than his older brother's leading performance) received praise in social media.

== Awards and nominations ==
Year	Award	Category	Nominee(s)	Result	Ref.
2020	7h Feroz Awards	Best Supporting Actor in a TV Series	Óscar Casas	Nominated	
