= Chinese Take-Away =

2011 Argentine film by Sebastián Borensztein

- Film poster
- Spanish: Un cuento chino
- Directed by: Sebastián Borensztein
- Written by: Sebastián Borensztein
- Produced by: Pablo Bossi; Gerardo Herrero; Juan Pablo Buscarini; Benjamin Odell; Axel Kuschevatzky
- Starring: Ricardo Darín
- Cinematography: Rolo Pulpeiro
- Edited by: Pablo Barbieri Carrera; Fernando Pardo
- Music by: Lucio Godoy
- Production companies: Pampa Films; Tornasol Films; Telefe
- Distributed by: Buena Vista International (Argentina); Alta Classics (Spain)
- Release dates: 24 March 2011 (Argentina); 17 June 2011 (Spain)
- Running time: 93 minutes
- Countries: Argentina; Spain
- Language: Spanish

Chinese Take-Away (Spanish: Un cuento chino) is a 2011 comedy-drama film written and directed by Sebastián Borensztein. The film was the highest grossing non-US film in Argentina in 2011.

== Plot ==
Roberto is a veteran who is characterised by orderliness and a firm belief in the value of control. He runs his own hardware store accordingly. For instance, if a supplier sells him boxes with screws and there are 100 in each, he counts all the screws in the box and he files a complaint if they give him extra or if some are missing. He feels that the world around his isle of neatness has gone mad. In order to prove his point, he collects newspaper articles about grotesque mishaps originally triggered by a lack of diligence. From time to time he is visited by Mari, a woman who is in love with him and wants to live with him.

While Roberto believes he has his life under control and is safe from surprises, he is confronted by an appalling incident. A Chinese man, Jun, is thrown out of a taxi in front of Roberto's eyes. Roberto helps him and tries to put things right again, as it is his nature. The task is particularly strenuous because neither speaks the other's language and Roberto is absolutely not in the habit of asking anybody for help. Jun and Roberto encounter several mishaps in the midst of trying to resolve Jun's situation. In the end, the pair find a delivery boy from a Chinese restaurant who can translate for them.

Jun discloses to Roberto he came to Argentina to find his uncle. Roberto explains to Jun that he has become such a grumpy man because his world view has been shattered by the Falklands War. Then Roberto provides an example on what he means when he considers the whole world gone mad. He shows Jun his collection of newspaper articles and points out the article about a Chinese girl who was killed by a cow that fell out of a moving aircraft. Yet Jun knows this story already since she was his fiancée and he actually came to Argentina because everything in China reminded him of this tragedy.

Eventually, Jun is able to connect with his uncle who lives in Mendoza. Roberto drives him to the airport and Jun gets on a plane to reunite with his uncle. Roberto tries to return to his quiet and ordered life but then travels to Mari's hometown to find her.

== Cast ==
- Ricardo Darín as Roberto
- Muriel Santa Ana as Mari
- Ignacio Huang as Jun
- Enric Cambray as Roberto as a Young Man (as Enric Rodríguez)
- Iván Romanelli as Leonel

== Release ==
The film was released theatrically in Spain on 17 June 2011 by Alta Classics.

== Accolades ==
List of awards and nominations
Award	Date of ceremony	Category	Recipients	Result
60th Argentine Film Critics Association Awards	11 June 2012	Best Director	Sebastián Borensztein	Nominated
60th Argentine Film Critics Association Awards	11 June 2012	Best Actor	Ricardo Darín	Nominated
60th Argentine Film Critics Association Awards	11 June 2012	Best Supporting Actress	Muriel Santa Ana	Nominated
60th Argentine Film Critics Association Awards	11 June 2012	Male Newcomer	Huang Sheng Huang	Nominated
60th Argentine Film Critics Association Awards	11 June 2012	Best Original Screenplay	Sebastián Borensztein	Nominated
60th Argentine Film Critics Association Awards	11 June 2012	Best Sound	Charly Schmukler and Eduardo Esquide	Nominated
2011 Argentine Academy of Cinematography Arts and Sciences Awards	12 December 2011	Best Film	Mariela Besuievski	Won
2011 Argentine Academy of Cinematography Arts and Sciences Awards	12 December 2011	Best Director	Sebastián Borensztein	Nominated
2011 Argentine Academy of Cinematography Arts and Sciences Awards	12 December 2011	Best Actor	Ricardo Darín	Won
2011 Argentine Academy of Cinematography Arts and Sciences Awards	12 December 2011	Best Supporting Actress	Muriel Santa Ana	Won
2011 Argentine Academy of Cinematography Arts and Sciences Awards	12 December 2011	Best Supporting Actor	Ignacio Huang	Nominated
2011 Argentine Academy of Cinematography Arts and Sciences Awards	12 December 2011	Best New Actress	Muriel Santa Ana	Nominated
2011 Argentine Academy of Cinematography Arts and Sciences Awards	12 December 2011	Best New Actor	Ignacio Huang	Nominated
2011 Argentine Academy of Cinematography Arts and Sciences Awards	12 December 2011	Best Original Screenplay	Sebastián Borensztein	Nominated
2011 Argentine Academy of Cinematography Arts and Sciences Awards	12 December 2011	Best Cinematography	Rodrigo Pulpeiro	Nominated
2011 Argentine Academy of Cinematography Arts and Sciences Awards	12 December 2011	Best Editing	Fernando Pardo and Pablo Barbieri	Nominated
2011 Argentine Academy of Cinematography Arts and Sciences Awards	12 December 2011	Best Art Direction	Valeria Ambrosio	Nominated
2011 Argentine Academy of Cinematography Arts and Sciences Awards	12 December 2011	Best Costume Design	Cristina Menela	Nominated
2011 Argentine Academy of Cinematography Arts and Sciences Awards	12 December 2011	Best Original Music	Lucio Godoy	Nominated
2011 Argentine Academy of Cinematography Arts and Sciences Awards	12 December 2011	Best Sound	Charly Smuckler and Eduardo Esquide	Nominated

== See also ==
- List of Argentine films of 2011
- List of Spanish films of 2011
