= Small Lives =

- Theatrical release poster
- Spanish: Vidas pequeñas
- Directed by: Enrique Gabriel
- Screenplay by: Lucie Lipschutz; Enrique Gabriel
- Produced by: Francisco Ramos
- Starring: Ana Fernández; Roberto Enríquez; Alicia Borrachero; Francisco Boira; Emilio Gutiérrez Caba; Ángela Molina
- Cinematography: David Carretero
- Edited by: Teresa Font
- Music by: Carlos P. Mántaras; Osvaldo Montes
- Production companies: Alquimia Cinema; El Baile
- Release dates: 29 October 2010 (Seminci); 18 March 2011 (Spain)
- Country: Spain
- Language: Spanish

Small Lives (Spanish: Vidas pequeñas) is a 2010 Spanish drama film directed by Enrique Gabriel and co-written by Lucie Lipschutz. Its ensemble cast features Ana Fernández, Roberto Enríquez, Alicia Borrachero, Francisco Boira, Emilio Gutiérrez Caba, and Ángela Molina.

== Plot ==
Bankrupt fashion designer Bárbara Helguera ends up living in a trailer park in the outskirts of Madrid called 'Vista Hermosa', coming across a wide array of characters.

== Cast ==
- Ana Fernández as Bárbara Helguera
- Roberto Enríquez as Andrés
- Alicia Borrachero as Mari Ángeles
- Francisco Boira as Fede
- Laura Domínguez as Cristina
- Yohana Cobo as Loredana
- Ángela Molina as Celeste
- Emilio Gutiérrez Caba as Pradal
- Asunción Balaguer
- Pyotr Zaychenko as Piotr

== Production ==
The screenplay was written by Gabriel in tandem with his mother. The film was produced by Alquimia Cinema and El Baile production and it had the participation of TVE.

== Release ==
Small Lives was presented as the closing screening of the main competition slate of the Valladolid International Film Festival (Seminci) on 29 October 2010. Distributed by Emon, it was released theatrically in Spain on 18 March 2011.

== Reception ==
Jonathan Holland of Variety described the film as a "rangy, intimate drama about an array of society's victims living in a trailer park".

Irene Crespo of Cinemanía rated the film 2½ out of 5 stars writing that the good thing "about 'telling nothing' about so many lives, [is] that some of them make it to the end safe and sound".

Lluís Bonet Mojica of La Vanguardia deemed Small Lives to be "a choral and well-structured film" about "a microcosm with a wide range of situations, without falling into weeping melodrama".

== Accolades ==
Year	Award	Category	Nominee(s)	Result	Ref.
2011	20th Actors and Actresses Union Awards	Best Film Actor in a Secondary Role	Emilio Gutiérrez Caba	Nominated	
2011	20th Actors and Actresses Union Awards	Best Film Actress in a Secondary Role	Alicia Borrachero	Nominated	

== See also ==
- List of Spanish films of 2011
