= Alicia Oliveira =

Argentine human rights lawyer (1942–2014)

- Born: Alicia Beatriz Oliveira; 24 November 1942; San Fernando, Argentina
- Died: 5 November 2014 (aged 71); Almagro, Buenos Aires, Argentina
- Education: Universidad del Salvador
- Occupations: Jurist, politician
- Political party: FREPASO; Faith Party
- Awards: Konex Award (2018)

Alicia Beatriz Oliveira (24 November 1942 – 5 November 2014) was an Argentine jurist and politician known for her work in defense of human rights. She became friends with Father Jorge Bergoglio, later Pope Francis, who baptized her three children.

== Biography ==
Alicia Oliveira was born in San Fernando de la Buena Vista on 24 November 1942, the youngest of three siblings from a middle-class family. She studied law at the Universidad del Salvador.

In 1973 she took office as judge of the Juvenile Correctional Court of the Federal Capital, the first woman to hold the position. While there, she established a friendship with Jesuit priest Jorge Bergoglio. She later recalled:

I remember that Bergoglio came to see me in court because of a third-party problem, back in 1974 or 1975. We began to chat, and an empathy was generated that opened the way to new conversations. In one of those chats we talked about the imminence of a coup. He was the provincial leader of the Jesuits and, surely, he was more informed than I was. In the press, even the names of future ministers were shuffled. The newspaper La Razón had published that José Alfredo Martínez de Hoz would be the Minister of Economy. [...] Bergoglio was very worried about what he sensed would happen and, as he knew about my commitment to human rights, he feared for my life. He even suggested that I go live at the Colegio Máximo for a while. But I did not accept, and I replied with completely unfortunate humor in the face of everything that later happened in the country: "I would rather be caught by the military than have to go live with the priests."

In 1976, Oliveira clashed with a colonel of the Federal Penitentiary Service while investigating mistreatment of political prisoners at Devoto prison. Later that year, on 24 March, she was dismissed from her position as a judge by the de facto authorities, who denounced her as, "inept, subversive, and corrupt". After this, she was protected by Beroglio from persecution by the military dictatorship. Over the next six years, she filed more habeas corpus motions than any other lawyer in Buenos Aires. Vatican ambassador Eduardo Valdés later wrote, "She always thanked Father Jorge, who in those days kept her hidden in a car to see her children, whom she loved above all things, to see them at the Colegio del Salvador."

In 1979, she accompanied Emilio F. Mignone in the creation of the Center for Legal and Social Studies. The same year, she participated in the drafting of the Justicialist Party complaint document which was signed by Deolindo Bittel and Herminio Iglesias. This was presented to the delegation of the Inter-American Commission on Human Rights during its visit to Argentina to collect complaints on the disappearances and kidnappings of political activists.

Oliveira was elected on behalf of the Front for a Country in Solidarity (FREPASO) as a conventional constituent to the 1994 amendment of the Constitution of Argentina.

From 1998 to 2003, she was Ombudsman of the City of Buenos Aires on behalf of FREPASO.

In October 1999, she participated in the management of the transfer of the remains of Father Carlos Mugica from La Recoleta to Villa 31. This was a scheme she had devised to prevent the neighborhood from being demolished to make way for a real estate development. She was aided in this by then Cardinal Jorge Bergoglio, who handled formalities with the priest's family to obtain the transfer of the body.

After the December 2001 riots, she participated in the intervention of human rights organizations for the release of the detainees in Buenos Aires.

From 2003 to 2005, Oliveira served as Secretary of Human Rights for the Ministry of Foreign Affairs.

On 19 March 2013, she was part of the presidential entourage that traveled to Vatican City to witness the inauguration of Pope Francis. When Francis faced opposition within Argentina, accusing him of having been linked with the military dictatorship, Oliveira made statements defending him in an interview with Perfil:

I used to meet Jorge twice a week. At that time the military had let me go from being a judge, and he would tell me what he was doing. [...] I remember that on Sundays we would go to Villa San Ignacio, where he was. We would have a meal, a small religious act, he would greet people, and there he took the opportunity to talk to people to get them out of the country. Once there was a young man who could not leave because he was very marked. But he resembled him. He gave him his identity card and his clerical collar so that he could escape.

On 11 August 2013, she was a candidate for senator for the Faith Party, a party led by Gerónimo Venegas, accompanying Carlos Campolongo as a deputy. They did not advance beyond the primary stage.

Alicia Oliveira died at her home in Almagro on 5 November 2014, after undergoing surgery for a brain tumor. A viewing of her body was held at the Buenos Aires City Legislature.

== Legacy ==
On 10 December 2014, President Cristina Fernández de Kirchner presented the former judge with the Azucena Villaflor Award, which was accepted by Oliveira's children. The event took place at the Casa Rosada. On 19 December, Pope Francis received her children in Vatican City, along with their spouses.

Oliveira is portrayed by Muriel Santa Ana in the Italian film Chiamatemi Francesco, which shows her friendship with Father Jorge Bergoglio.

In 2018, the Konex Foundation awarded her a posthumous Merit Diploma as one of the most important Argentine public administrators of the decade.
