= Burgohondo =

- municipality
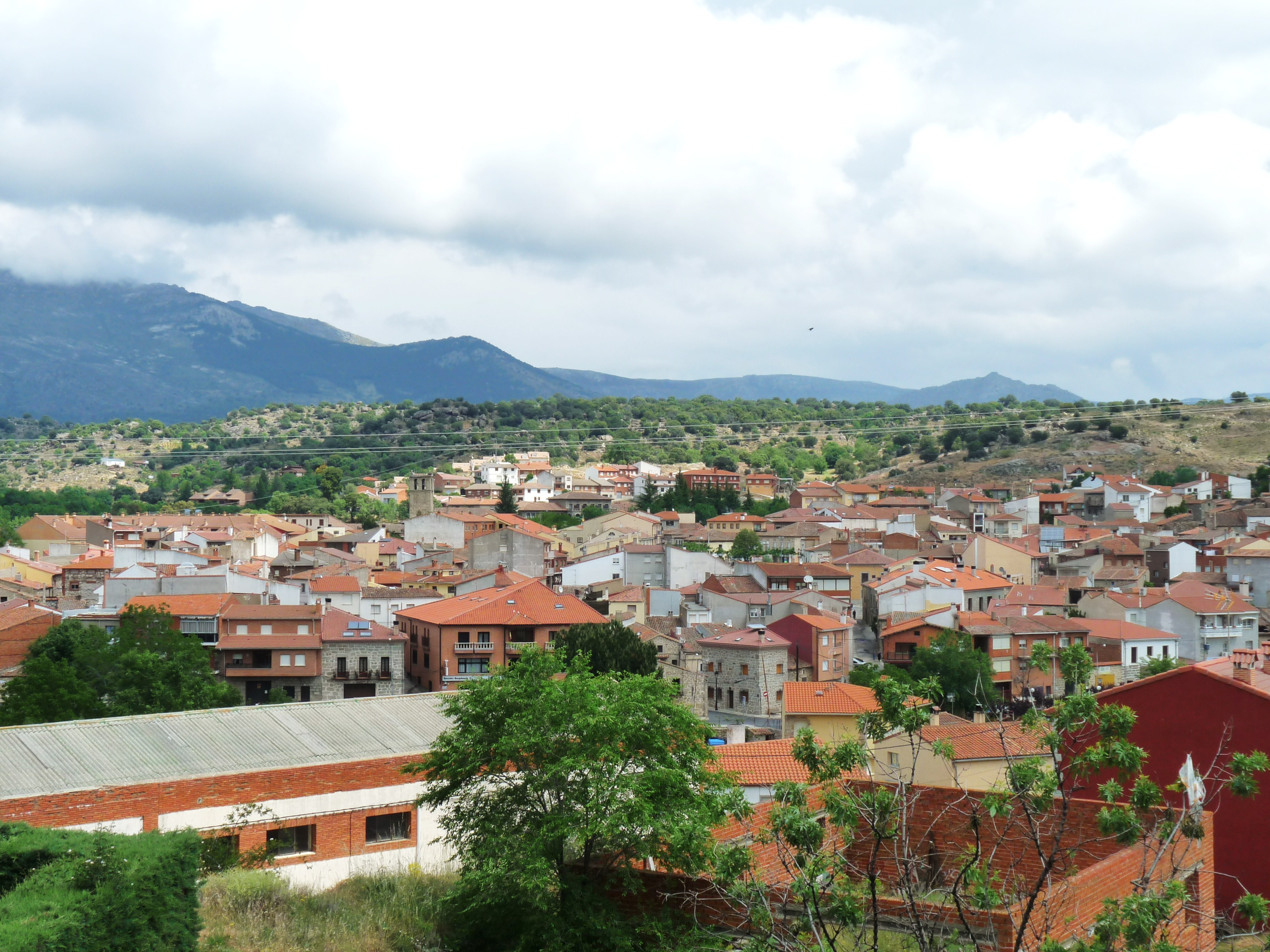
- Burgohondo, (Ávila), Spain.

- Flag Coat of arms

- Location in Spain. Burgohondo (Spain)
- Coordinates: 40°24′49″N 4°47′11″W
- Country: Spain
- Autonomous community: Castile and León
- Province: Ávila
- Municipality: Burgohondo

Area
  - Total: 55.34 km^{2} (21.37 sq mi)
- Elevation: 847 m (2,779 ft)

Population (2025-01-01)
  - Total: 1,269
  - Density: 22.93/km^{2} (59.39/sq mi)
- Time zone: UTC+1 (CET)
  - Summer (DST): UTC+2 (CEST)
- Website: Official website

Burgohondo is a municipality located in the province of Ávila, Castile and León, Spain. According to the 2004 census (INE), the municipality has a population of 1,184 inhabitants. It is located in the center of the Valle del Alberche, and area located in the Sierra de Gredos. Its territory has an extension of 55.34 km².

The origin of Burgohondo starts in 1179 around the Abadía del Burgo del Fondo.

== Population ==
Historical population
Year	Pop.	±% p.a.
2023	1,240	—
2024	1,249	+0.73%
2025	1,269	+1.60%
Source: INE
