= Miryam Gallego =

Spanish actress (born 1976)

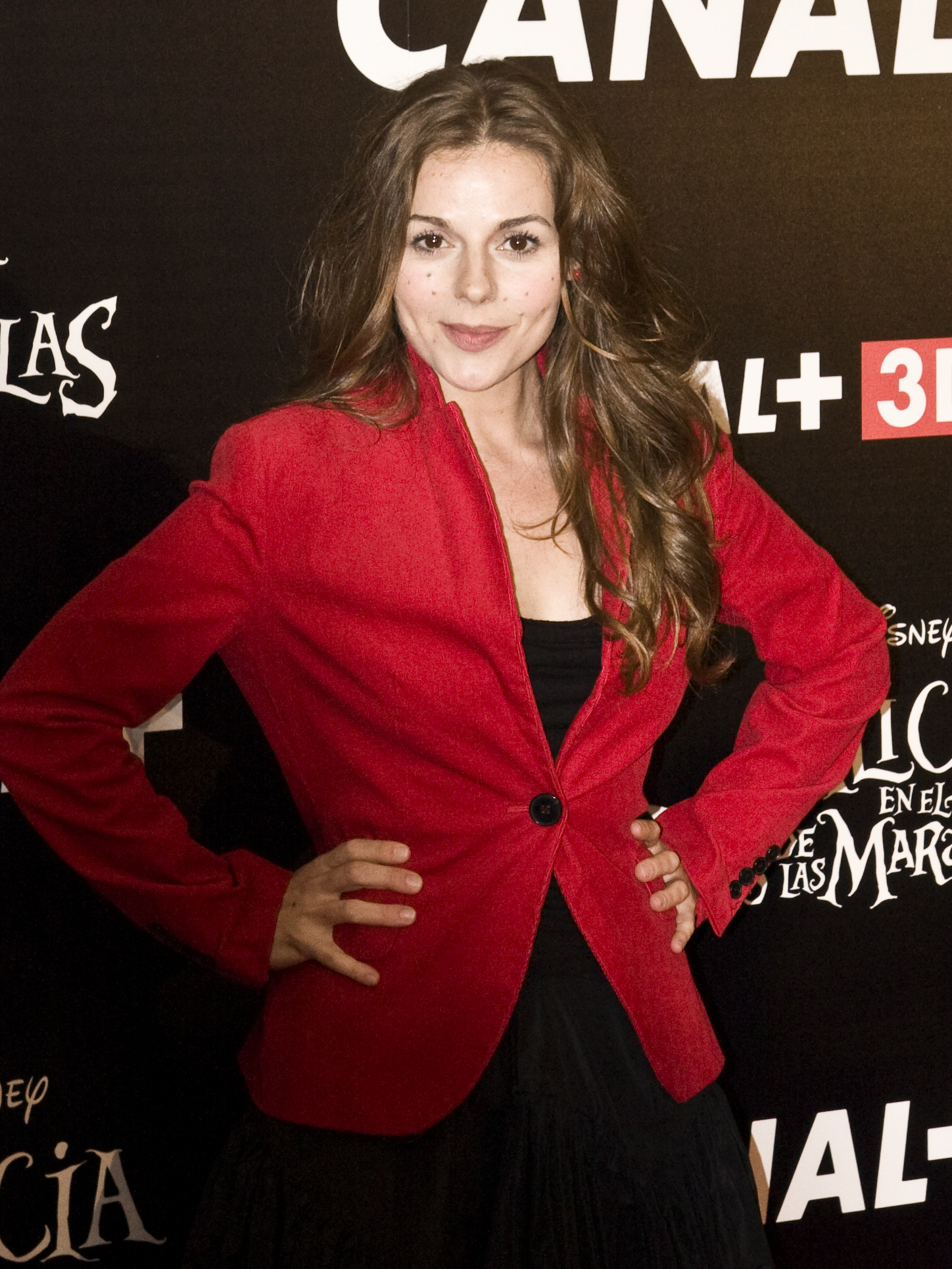
- (2010)
- Born: 1976 (age 49–50); Ourense, Spain
- Occupation: Actress

Miryam Gallego (born 1976) is a Spanish actress. She played the iconic villainous role of the Marchioness of Santillana in the television series Águila Roja, which earned her public recognition.

== Biography ==
Born in Ourense in 1976, her father is from Nocelo da Pena whereas her mother is from Vilamarín. She studied acting.

Gallego started her television career playing a minor role in the Galician series Pratos combinados, aired on the regional broadcaster TVG. She also performed guest roles in Policías, en el corazón de la calle, as well as in El comisario. In 2000, Gallego landed a main cast role in the popular series Periodistas, playing Claudia, an intern working at the editorial office of Crónica, the fictional newspaper the series was centered on. She later played roles in Hospital Central and Lobos, early cancelled because of low audience ratings.

She had her debut in a feature film with her performance in the 2007 drama Concursante (2007), in which she starred together with Leonardo Sbaraglia.

The breakthrough role consolidating her acting career was her performance in the adventure television series Águila Roja, aired on La 1. She played Lucrecia, an ambitious and ruthless woman, widowed marchioness of Santillana, whose intrigues carried a substantial part of the plot of the 9-season-long series, ended in 2016.

She starred in the television series Secretos de Estado, aired on Telecinco in 2019, playing the character of Ana Chantelle, the wife of the Spanish prime minister. Gallego herself noted a sense of disappointment with the development of the series, sold as a political thriller but rather delving around intimate relationships, with the political plot only present as a backdrop.

She also appeared in the erotic thriller series Instinto (aired on Movistar+ in 2019), playing the role of Sara Ortuño.

== Filmography ==
Television

Year	Title	Role	Notes	Ref
2000–2002	Periodistas	Claudia Montero	Main role	
2005	Lobos			
2009–2016	Águila Roja	Lucrecia, Marquesa de Santillana		
2017	El ministerio del tiempo	Mencía	Guest role	
2019	Secretos de Estado	Ana Chantelle		
2019	Instinto	Sara Ortuño		
TBD	Sequía			

Film

Year	Title	Role	Notes	Ref
2007	Concursante (The Contestant)	Laura		
2011	Águila Roja: la película (Red Eagle, the Movie)	La Marquesa	Reprise of role in the TV series.	
2011	La voz dormida (The Sleeping Voice)			
2013	Paradise	Pili		
