= Muriel Santa Ana =

Argentine actress (born 1968)

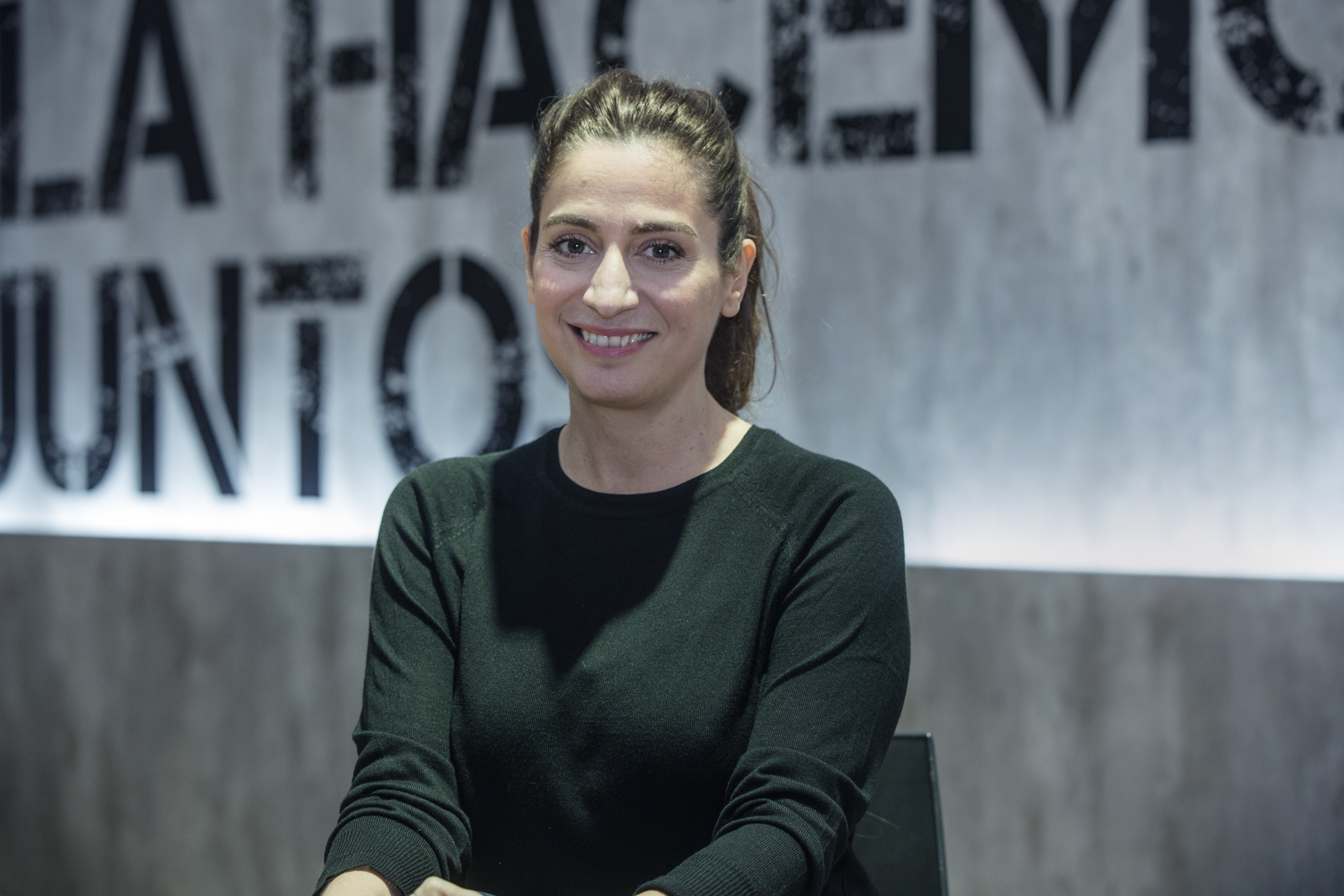
- Muriel Santa Ana in 2017
- Born: July 13, 1968 (age 57); Buenos Aires, Argentina
- Education: Escuela Úrsula Llames de Lapuente; Escuela Normal Numero 6 de Palermo
- Occupation(s): Actress and singer
- Years active: 1995-present
- Parent(s): Walter Santa Ana and Mabel González

Muriel Santa Ana (born July 13, 1968) is an Argentine actress. She works in the TV series Solamente Vos.

== Biography ==
Santa Ana is the daughter of actor Walter Santa Ana and Mabel González; she also has a sister named Moira who is a singer and voice teacher. She completed her primary studies at the Escuela Úrsula Llames de Lapuente in Palermo, Ciudad de Buenos Aires, Argentina. Her parents separated when she turned 9, and both daughters went to live with their mother. A former student of the Escuela Normal Numero 6 de Palermo, Santa Ana attended high school with singer Érica García and actress Marcela Guerty. Long before deciding to be an actress, she studied flamenco, tango, flute, ceramics and Italian, and worked as an editor. At age 18 she began studying theater with Agustín Alezzo and then continued with other teachers such as Juan Carlos Gené, Rubén Szuchmacher, and Guillermo Angelelli.

== Career ==
Since 1995 she participated in plays, but it was in 2005 when she arrived on television, recommended by Luis Brandoni, playing the character of Venus in Una familia especial. In that program she met Mike Amigorena, who in 2006 invited her to join an experimental rock-pop theatrical music band, Ambulance, along with other actors such as Mariano Torre, Luciano Bonanno, Julián Vilar and Víctor Malagrino to later transform into an Orchestra-show by Sergio D'Angelo. Then would come Juanita, la soltera. That year she also participated in the telenovela Lalola playing the character of Graciela, which earned her public recognition and for which her obtained her first nomination for Martín Fierro Awards in 2007. In 2009 she was summoned by the director Juan Taratuto to be the protagonist of the telenovela Ciega a citas, based on a blog by Carolina Aguirre, with the character of Lucía González, a journalist who will have 258 days, until the date on which her sister will marry to find a boyfriend to suit her and thus be able to take revenge on her mother.

== Filmography ==
=== Theater ===
Year	Title
1995	Mariana Pineda
1995	Aquellos gauchos judíos
1997-1998	Entretanto las grandes urbes
1999-2000	La vida de Galileo
2002	La casa de Bernarda Alba
2004	La ópera de tres centavos
2006	Woyzeck
2006	El pan de la locura
2006-2007	Chicas católicas
2008	Tres hermanas
2009	La cocina
2010	La vida es sueño
2012	Todos Felices
2013	El gran deschave
2014	Lluvia de plata
2016	Absorta y desnuda (poemas)
2016	Idénticos
2016	El andador
2017	Bichas
2017-2019	Los vecinos de arriba

=== Television ===
Year	Title	Character	Channel
2005	Una familia especial	Venus Schneider	Canal 13
2006	Juanita, la soltera	Perla	Canal 13
2007-2008	Lalola	Graciela Neira	América TV
2009-2010	Ciega a citas	Lucía González	Canal 7
2011	Un año para recordar	Dr. Albertina Busaniche	Telefe
2011	El hombre de tu vida	Carla	Telefe
2012	El donante	Eva Azcurra	Telefe
2013-2014	Solamente vos	Ingrid "La Polaca" Albarracín de Cousteau	Canal 13
2014-2015	Guapas	Reina Suárez	Canal 13
2015	Conflictos modernos		Canal 9
2016	Fundación Huésped: Al borde		Canal 13
2017	Quiero vivir a tu lado	Marcela Justo	Canal 13
2017	Sufragistas, en memoria de las mujeres que cambiaron la historia		Canal Encuentro
2018	Sandro de América	Olga Garaventa	Telefe
2018	100 días para enamorarse	Anette Guevara	Telefe
2019	El Tigre Verón	Lorena Raimundi	Canal 13

=== Movies ===
Year	Movie	Character	Director
2007	Incómodos	Nun	
2008	Negro Buenos Aires	Gaby	
2010	Plumíferos	White nun	Daniel De Felippo and Gustavo A. Giannini
2011	Un cuento chino	Mari	Sebastián Borensztein
2011	Mi primera boda	Bridesmaid	Ariel Winograd
2015	Chiamatemi Francesco	Alicia Oliveira	Daniele Luchetti
2015	Caída del cielo	Julia	
2017	Mamá se fue de viaje		Ariel Winograd

== Awards and nominations ==
Year	Award	Category	Work	Result
2007	Martín Fierro Awards	Actress in a Comedy Cast	Lalola	Nominated
2009	Martín Fierro Awards	Comedy Protagonist Actress	Ciega a citas	Winner
2010	Martín Fierro Awards	Actress Protagonist of the Novel	Ciega a citas	Nominated
2010	ACE Awards	Leading Actress	La cocina	Nominated
2011	María Guerrero Award	Leading Actress	La vida es sueño	Nominated
2011	ACE Awards	Leading Actress	La vida es sueño	Nominated
2011	Sur Awards	Supporting Actress	Un cuento chino	Winner
2011	Silver Condor Awards	Supporting Actress	Un cuento chino	Nominated
2012	Martín Fierro Awards	Unitary Protagonist Actress	El donante	Nominated
2013	CAPIT Award	Supporting Actress	Solamente vos	Winner
