= Ignacio Huang =

Taiwanese singer and actor

- 黃勝煌
- Born: Huang Sheng Huang; January 1, 1980 (age 46); Taipei, Taiwan
- Citizenship: Taiwan; Argentina
- Education: Universidad Nacional de las Artes
- Occupations: Actor, graphic designer
- Years active: 2003–present

Ignacio Huang (Chinese: 黃勝煌; pinyin: Huang Sheng Huang; born January 1, 1980) is a Taiwanese-born actor and graphic designer based in Argentina. He is best known internationally for his role as Jun in the 2011 film Chinese Take-Away. Huang also appeared in Filmatrón in 2007 and La canción del inmigrante in 2008. He also had a role in El Ratón Pérez 2. He co-starred in Charlotte alongside Ángela Molina.

== Biography ==
His family emigrated from Taiwan to Paraguay, where they lived for eight years, before settling in Buenos Aires when he was eleven. He is a graduate of the University of Buenos Aires and later studied acting under Norman Briski. In addition to acting, Huang has performed glove puppetry, as well as taught ink painting and hosted cooking classes in Chinese and Taiwanese cuisine.
