= Guillermo Campra =

Spanish actor

- Born: 11 March 1997 (age 28)

Guillermo Martín Campra Elizalde (born in Barcelona, Spain, on 11 March 1997) is a Spanish actor.

== Filmography ==
=== Television ===
- El Internado (2008-2009)
- Águila Roja (2009-2016)
- Boca Norte (2019)
- Elite (2022)

=== Films ===
- Carlitos y el Campo de los Sueños (2008)
- Águila Roja, la película (2011)

== Awards ==
- 2009 Best New Actor: Festival de Televisión y Cine Histórico del Reino de León
- 2009 Best Actor: Festival Internacional de Cine Infantil Santo Domingo
- 2012 Best Young Actor in an International Feature Film: Young Artist Award - Nominated
