= Yohana Cobo =

Spanish actress (born 1985)

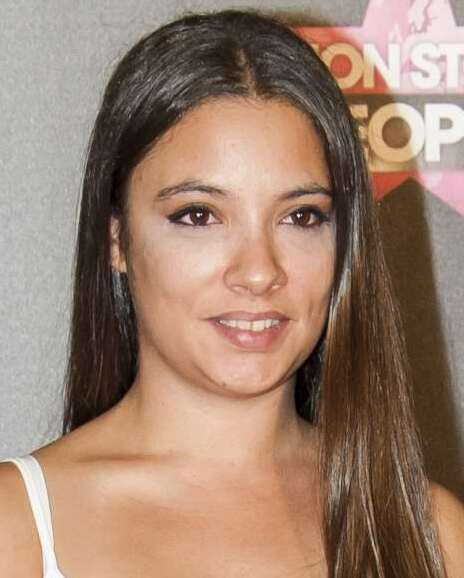
- Cobo in 2015
- Born: 12 January 1985 (age 40); Madrid, Spain
- Occupation: Actress
- Years active: 1993–present

Yohana Cobo (born 12 January 1985) is a Spanish actress who began her career as a child actress. She is best known for her role in the film Volver (2006), which earned her a Cannes Film Festival Award for Best Actress.

== Filmography ==
=== Films ===
- 1997 - Campeones
- 2000 - Aunque tú no lo sepas
- 2001 - Sin noticias de Dios
- 2002 - Semana santa
- 2003 - La vida mancha (Life Marks)
- 2004 - Las Llaves de la independencia
- 2004 - El Séptimo día
- 2004 - Seres queridos
- 2005 - Fin de curso
- 2006 - Volver
- 2006 - Arena en los bolsillos (post-production)
- 2009 - Tramontana
- 2010 - Vidas pequeñas (Small Lives)

=== Television ===
- El Comisario ("La Casa de las meriendas"; 2005)
- Código fuego ("Despedidas"; 2003)
- Hospital Central ("Decisiones"; 2002)
- Hermanas (1998–99)

== Awards ==
- Cannes Film Festival - 2006 Best Actress together with the rest of the female cast of Volver.
