= Francis Lorenzo =

Spanish actor and presenter

- Born: Francisco Javier Lorenzo Torres; September 24, 1960 (age 66); Pontevedra, Spain
- Occupations: Actor; television presenter

Francisco Javier Lorenzo Torres (born September 24, 1960), better known as Francis Lorenzo, is a Spanish actor and presenter. He is the brother of producer José Manuel Lorenzo.

== Filmography ==
=== Feature films ===
- Las cosas del querer (1989), directed by Jaime Chávarri.
- Terranova (1990) (TV Movie), directed by Ferran Llagostera.
- Un paraguas para tres (1992), directed by Felipe Vega.
- Huidos (1993), directed by Sancho Gracia.
- Tocando fondo (1993), directed by José Luis Cuerda.
- Tirano Banderas (1993), directed by José Luis García Sánchez.
- El detective y la muerte (1994), directed by Gonzalo Suárez.
- Cómo ser infeliz y disfrutarlo (1994), directed by Enrique Urbizu.
- La pasión turca (1994), directed by Vicente Aranda.
- Nadie hablará de nosotras cuando hayamos muerto (1995), directed by Agustín Díaz Yanes.
- Mar de luna (1995), directed by Manolo Matji.
- El rey del río (1995), directed by Manuel Gutiérrez Aragón.
- El seductor (1995), directed by José Luis García Sánchez.
- Antártida (1995), directed by Manuel Huerga.
- Sabor latino (1996), directed by Pedro Carvajal.
- Corsarios del chip (1996), directed by Rafael Alcázar.
- Gran slalom (1996), directed by Jaime Chávarri.
- Black (1998), directed by Héctor Barca.
- El florido pensil (2002), directed by Juan José Porto.
- El año del diluvio (2004), directed by Jaime Chávarri.
- Tiovivo c. 1950 (2004), directed by José Luis Garci.
- Águila Roja: la película (2011), directed by José Ramón Ayerra.

=== Short films ===
- Un café de ollos verdes (1992), directed by Antonio F. Simón.
- Los amigos del muerto (1993), directed by Icíar Bollaín.
- Sitcom show (1996), directed by Ángel de la Cruz.
- Dos años y medio en un terrario (2021), directed by Matutano.

== Television ==
=== Series ===
Year	Title	Network	Character	Episodes
1990	La forja de un rebelde	La 1		1 episode
1990	El obispo leproso	La 1		2 episodes
1992	Hasta luego, cocodrilo	La 1		5 episodes
1992	El C.I.D.	ITV	Juli	1 episode
1994	El día que me quieras	La 1		1 episode
1995	Curro Jiménez	La 1	Marqués	1 episode
1995	Por fin solos	Antena 3	Teddy	14 episodes
1995–1996	Médico de familia	Telecinco	Julio Suárez	41 episodes
1995–1996	Canguros	Antena 3	Fermín	22 episodes
1996	Turno de oficio: 10 años después	La 1	Álvaro	1 episode
1998–2002	Compañeros	Antena 3	Alfredo Torán	121 episodes
2004–2006	Mis adorables vecinos	Antena 3	Ernesto Sandoval	62 episodes
2009–2016	Águila Roja	La 1	Hernán Mejías "El Comisario"	102 episodes
2011	El ángel de Budapest	La 1	Ángel	TV Movie
2014	Códice	TVG	Comisario	TV Movie
2015	Hospital Real	TVG	Don Leopoldo	1 episode
2019	La caza. Monteperdido	La 1	Santiago Baín	
2020–2021	Dime quién soy	Movistar Plus+	Javier Carranza	9 episodes
2022	El inmortal	Movistar Plus+	Comisario Corvarán	6 episodes
2023	Cristo y Rey	Atresplayer	Fernando Arias-Salgado	2 episodes
2023–present	4 estrellas	La 1	Rafael Albalad	? episodes

Programs

- España a ras de cielo (2013; 2015), from La 1.
- Seguridad vital (2015), from La 1.
- MasterChef Celebrity (2018), from La 1.
- Mi casa es la tuya (2018), from Telecinco.

== Accolades ==
Year	Award	Category	Work	Result	Ref.
2011	43rd New York Latin ACE Awards	Best Character Actor	Red Eagle	Won	
2011	20th Actors and Actresses Union Awards	Best Film Actor in a Secondary Role	Red Eagle	Nominated	
