= Inma Cuesta =

Spanish actress (born 1980)

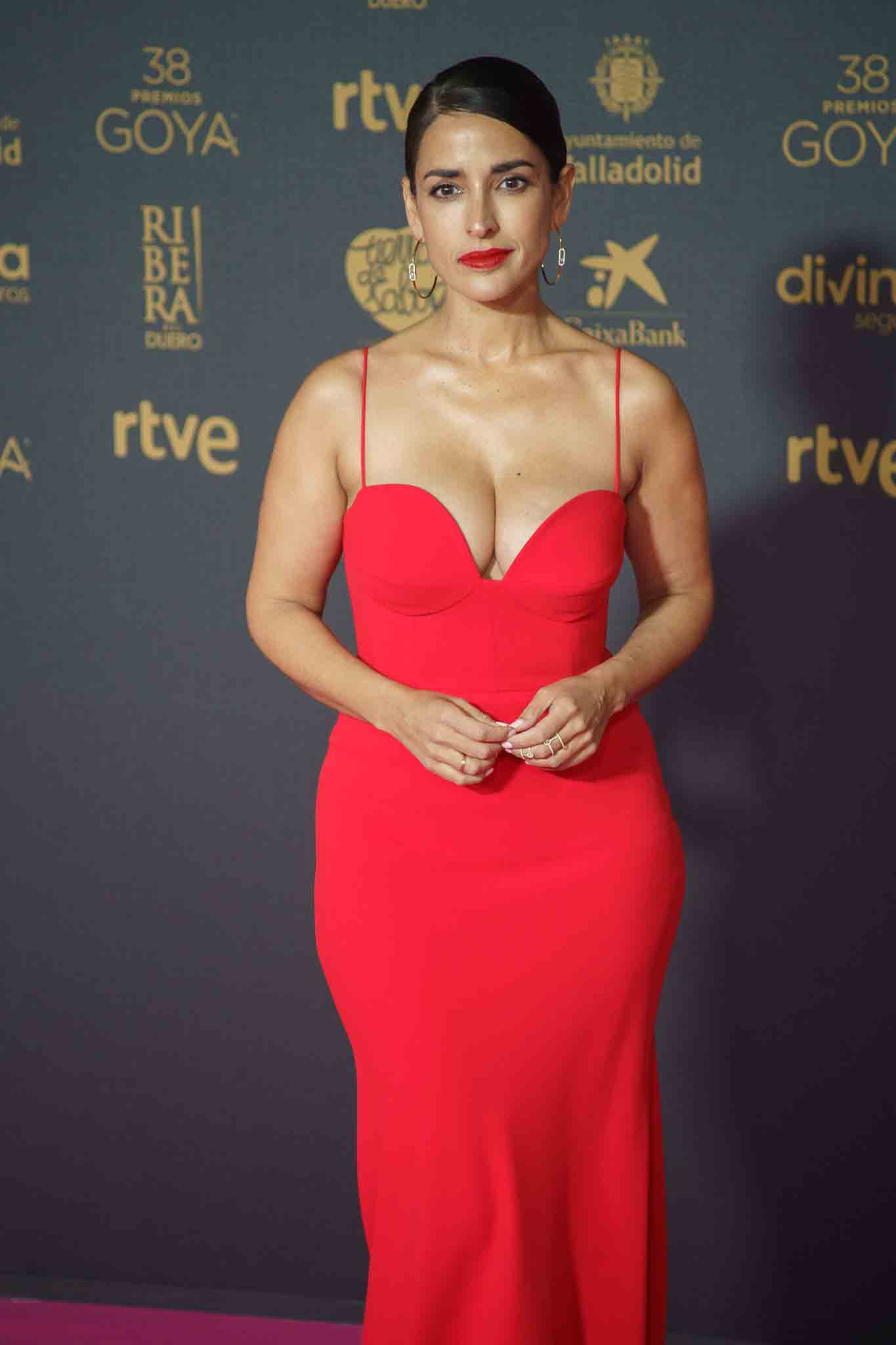
- Cuesta in 2024
- Born: Inmaculada Cuesta Martínez; 25 June 1980 (age 46); Valencia, Spain
- Occupation: Actress
- Years active: 2006–present
- Spouse: Ángeles Maeso (m. 2025)

Inmaculada Cuesta Martínez (born 25 June 1980) is a Spanish actress. She has starred in films such as The Sleeping Voice (2011), Three Many Weddings (2013), and The Bride (2015).

Some of her best known television credits include performances in Águila Roja and Arde Madrid.

== Early life ==
Inmaculada Cuesta Martínez was born in Valencia on 25 June 1980. Born to parents from Andalusia, Cuesta spent her childhood in Arquillos, province of Jaén (Andalusia). Her father was an upholsterer, and she used to collect the leftovers to make handbags and sell them to finance her studies. Aged 18, she moved to Córdoba to study at the School of Dramatic Art. After completing her studies, she continued her training in Seville. In 2005 she moved to Madrid and entered the Conservatory and School of Dance, a performing arts center run by Carmen Roche.

== Career ==
Once settled in the capital of Spain, Cuesta undertook her career in the world of the theater from the hand of Nacho Cano starring in the musical Hoy no me puedo levantar. Her first starring role in television was in the series Amar en tiempos revueltos, playing the role of Elisa, a humble girl who became a well-known singer of the time.

After three seasons and almost three years in the musical she signed for another television series, Plan América with Pepe Sancho (TVE 2008).

Very soon she got her first role in the cinema with the 2007 comedy Love Expresso, in which she featured alongside Asier Etxeandía, Alejo Sauras, Diego Paris, Terele Pávez and Elena Ballesteros, among others. Later, she starred together with Fele Martínez and Angel de Andrés the film El kaserón.

In 2009, she began to play the role of Margarita in the series Águila roja which was broadcast by the Spanish public television service TVE.

She shot Águila Roja: la película, the film version of the series, and starred in the film Cousinhood, a comedy by Daniel Sánchez Arévalo, along with Quim Gutiérrez, Raúl Arévalo and Antonio de la Torre. On 21 October 2011 she premiered The Sleeping Voice, a film by Benito Zambrano, co-starring with María León.

At the beginning of 2012, she was a nominee for the Goya Awards as Best Actress thanks to her role in The Sleeping Voice. That year, she also participated in the shooting of the film Unit 7 (Alberto Rodríguez) with Mario Casas and Antonio de la Torre. Also, she played the role of Carmen de Triana in Blancanieves, a silent and black-and-white version of fairy tale Snow White, in which actresses Maribel Verdú, Ángela Molina and Macarena García also starred.

Almost at the same time, she starred in the short film by Rodrigo Atíza, Muchacha con paisaje and participated in Words with Gods (based on Guillermo Arriaga's idea) from the hand of Álex de la Iglesia in a project where directors from all around the world present an episode about religion.

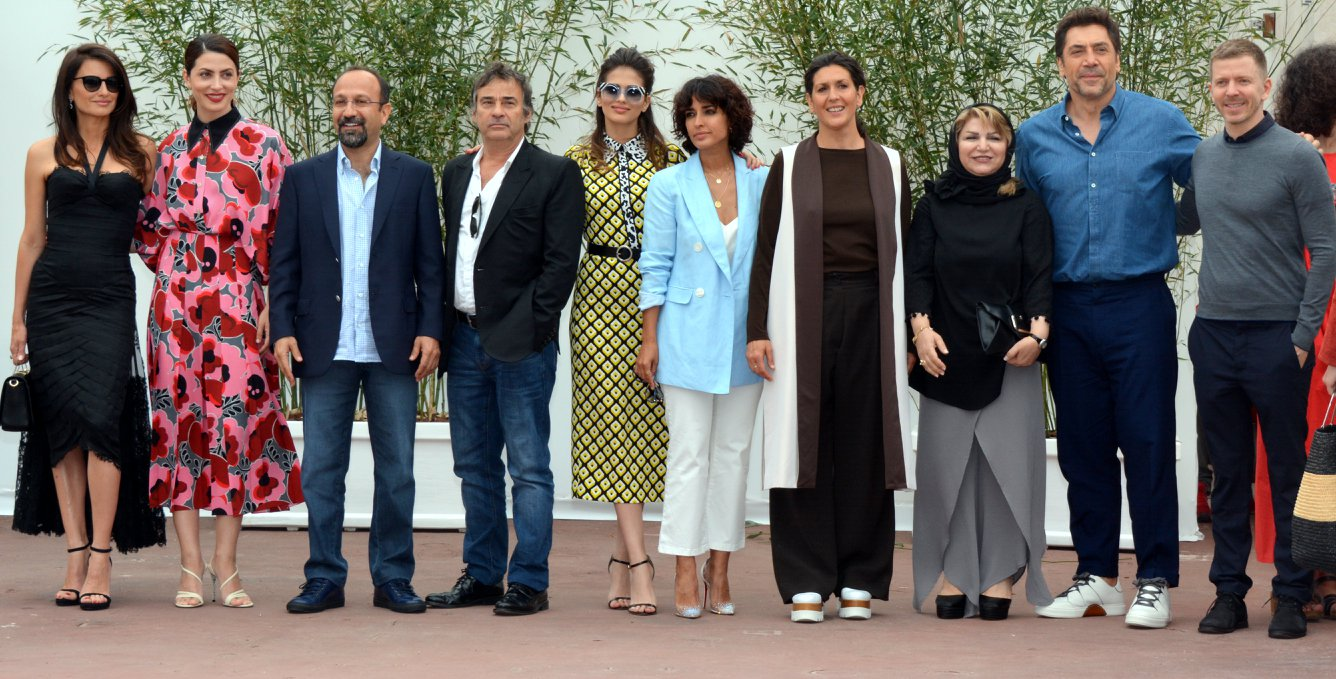
Cuesta (sixth from the left) together with other crew and cast members of Everybody Knows at the 71st Cannes Film Festival (2018).

In November 2012, she starred together with Alberto Ammann, Karra Elejalde and Antonio de la Torre on Daniel Calparsoro’s last film, Invader, for which she won the nomination for best supporting actress at the Mestre Mateo Awards.

In 2013 she played Ruth in Javier Ruiz Caldera's story Three Many Weddings, with Martiño Rivas, Paco León, Quim Gutiérrez, Rossy de Palma and Laura Sánchez, among others. She returned to musicals with Javier Gutiérrez and Marta Ribera with ¡Ay, Carmela!. In 2016, along with Argentine actor Ricardo Darín, she performed as a young girl from a small villa in Buenos Aires in the film Kóblic by Sebastián Borensztein.

== Personal life ==
In 2025, Cuesta married her long-term girlfriend, screenwriter and producer Ángeles Maeso. They have two children together.

== Activism ==
Inma Cuesta is considered one of the most committed feminist Spanish actresses and asserts that women, and actresses, can be the driving force behind stories, especially "when women get to a certain age, and seem to disappear from film and from the industry". She has also supported campaigns like "Tu silla, tu refugio" by the Comisión Española de Ayuda al Refugiado (CEAR).

In 2015 the actress condemned via her Instagram account photoshopping done to an image published on the cover of the Sunday magazine edition of the newspaper El Periódico, questioning "the 'beauty standards' the we are obliged to follow" calling for "freedom from trends and stereotypes de modas" and affirming that she did not feel insecure but rather "indignant" as a woman and underlining that she was against photoshop. "The photo on the right was taken on my phone directly from the computer during the photography session, me in full, without tricks, the complete Inma", the actress wrote in the caption under her photo, in which the differences in one of her arms and the outline of her hips were visible.

In January 2019 when she received the award for best television actress at the Feroz Awards she paid tribute to "all women, that they may never again tell us what to do".

== Filmography ==
=== Film ===
Year	Title	Role	Notes	Ref.
2007	Café solo o con ellas (Love Expresso)	Sonia		
2009	El kaserón	Eva		
2011	Águila Roja: la película (Red Eagle, the Movie)	Margarita	Reprise of her role in the TV series	
2011	Primos (Cousinhood)	Martina		
2011	La voz dormida (The Sleeping Voice)	Hortensia		
2012	Grupo 7 (Unit 7)	Elena		
2012	Blancanieves (Snow White)	Carmen de Triana		
2012	Invasor (Invader)	Ángela		
2013	3 bodas de más (Three Many Weddings)	Ruth		
2015	Las ovejas no pierden el tren (Sidetracked)	Luisa		
2015	La novia (The Bride)	La novia		
2015	Los miércoles no existen (Wednesdays Don't Exist)	Mara		
2016	Julieta	Ava		
2016	Kóblic	Nancy		
2018	Todos lo saben (Everybody Knows)	Ana		
2019	Vivir dos veces (Live Twice, Love Once)	Julia		
2021	El páramo (The Wasteland)	Lucía		
2023	Los buenos modales (Good Manners)	Manuela		
2023	Todos los nombres de Dios (All the Names of God)	Pilar Montero		
2023	El favor (Just One Small Favor)	Teresa		
2025	Un funeral de locos	Amaia		

=== Television ===
Year	Title	Role	Notes	Ref.
2020	El desorden que dejas (The Mess You Leave Behind)	Raquel	Main role	
2019	Criminal: Spain	Carmen	Episode: Carmen	
2018	Arde Madrid	Ana Mari	Main role	
2017–2018	El accidente (The Accident)	Lucía	Main role	
2009–2016	Águila Roja (Red Eagle)	Margarita Hernando	Main role	
2008	Plan América	Lucía Alonso	Main role; 5 episodes	
2008	La familia Mata	Sonia	Recurring role; 5 episodes	
2006–2007	Amar en tiempos revueltos	Elisa Domínguez Pastor	Main role; 221 episodes	
2026	Berlín y la dama del armiño (Berlin and the Lady with an Ermine)	Candela		

=== Theater ===
Year	Play	Role	Notes
2013	¡Ay, Carmela!	Carmela	Musical, main role
2005–2009	Hoy no me puedo levantar (I can't get up today)	María	Main role

== Accolades ==
Year	Award	Category	Work	Result	Ref.
2010	19th Actors and Actresses Union Awards	Best Television Actress in a Secondary Role	Red Eagle	Nominated	
2010	13th ATV Awards	Best Actress in a Series	Red Eagle	Nominated	
2012	26th Goya Awards	Best Actress	The Sleeping Voice	Nominated	
2012	21st Actors and Actresses Union Awards	Best Film Actress in a Leading Role	The Sleeping Voice	Nominated	
2013	22nd Actors and Actresses Union Awards	Best Film Actress in a Minor Role	Snow White	Nominated	
2014	1st Feroz Awards	Best Actress	Three Many Weddings	Nominated	
2014	69th CEC Medals	Best Actress	Three Many Weddings	Nominated	
2014	28th Goya Awards	Best Actress	Three Many Weddings	Nominated	
2016	3rd Feroz Awards	Best Actress	The Bride	Won	
2016	8th Gaudí Awards	Best Actress	The Bride	Nominated	
2016	30th Goya Awards	Best Actress	The Bride	Nominated	
2016	25th Actors and Actresses Union Awards	Best Film Actress in a Leading Role	The Bride	Won	
2016	3rd Platino Awards	Best Actress	The Bride	Nominated	
2017	22nd Forqué Awards	Best Actress	The Bride	Nominated	
2019	6th Feroz Awards	Best Main Actress in a Series	Arde Madrid	Won	
2019	28th Actors and Actresses Union Awards	Best Television Actress in a Leading Role	Arde Madrid	Won	
2019	6th Platino Awards	Best Actress in a Miniseries or TV series	Arde Madrid	Nominated	
2021	8th Platino Awards	Best Actress in a Miniseries or TV series	The Mess You Leave Behind	Nominated	
2024	3rd Carmen Awards	Best Actress	Just One Small Favor	Nominated	
