= Águila roja =

- Genre: Adventure; Swashbuckler
- Created by: Daniel Écija; Pilar Nadal; Ernesto Pozuelo; Juan Carlos Cueto
- Starring: David Janer; Javier Gutiérrez; Inma Cuesta; Miryam Gallego; Francis Lorenzo
- Country of origin: Spain
- Original language: Spanish
- No. of seasons: 9
- No. of episodes: 116

Production
- Executive producer: Hugo Mendiri Villarruvia
- Producers: César Ruíz de Diego; Miguel Turón
- Running time: 80 minutes (approx.)
- Production company: Globomedia for Televisión Española

Original release
- Network: La 1
- Release: February 19, 2009 – October 27, 2016

Águila Roja (English: Red Eagle) is a Spanish adventure television series set in Spain during the 17th century. It was produced by Globomedia for Televisión Española and was broadcast on La 1 of Televisión Española from 2009 to 2016. It is one of the channel's most successful shows, and its rights have been sold to several countries.

The aim of the show was to capitalize on the success of Televisión Española's period dramas such as Cuéntame cómo pasó, La Señora or Amar en tiempos revueltos, but at the same time aiming for mature audiences with a masked hero in the style of Zorro or Green Arrow as the main character. Many of the latter shows carry warnings that they are for mature audiences only.

== Synopsis ==
The series begins in 1660 and follows Gonzalo de Montalvo (David Janer), a school teacher who trained as a ninja while exiled in Japan as he traveled through Asia during his youth, said to be the illegitimate son of reigning king Philip IV, as he becomes Águila Roja in an attempt to expose the assassin of his wife and avenge her death, which usually includes foiling plots against the monarchy planned by a secret society known as "La Logia" ("The Lodge"), amongst whose members are Lucrecia (Miryam Gallego), Marquess of Santillana, and Hernán Mejías (Francis Lorenzo), Commissioner in the Village of Madrid.

== Cast ==
- David Janer as Gonzalo de Montalvo / Águila Roja
- Javier Gutiérrez as Saturno "Sátur" García
- Inma Cuesta as Margarita Hernando
- Miryam Gallego as Lucrecia de Guzmán, Marquesa de Santillana
- Francis Lorenzo as Hernán Mejías Benavides / El comisario
- Pepa Aniorte as Catalina del Valle †
- Santiago Molero as Cipriano "Cipri" Benítez
- Pepe Quero as Floro Morales †
- Erika Sanz as Inés †
- Roberto Álamo as Juan de Calatrava, duque de Velasco y Fonseca
- Guillermo Campra as Alonso de Montalvo Hernando
- Patrick Criado as Nuño de Santillana y Guzmán, Marqués de Santillana
- Adolfo Fernández as Agustín †
- Xabier Elorriaga as Rey Felipe IV
- José Ángel Egido as Cardenal Francisco de Mendoza y Balboa
- Elisa Mouliaá as Ana / Irene de Mendoza
- Julia Gutiérrez Caba as Laura de Montignac †
- Mónica Cruz as Mariana / Claudia
- Loles León as Sagrario de Castro
- Carlos Areces as Jacobo de Castro
- Amaruk Kayshapanta as Maya Indian chief
- Óscar Casas as Gabi.
- Eusebio Poncela as Malasangre.
- Carles Francino as Monseñor Adrián Vega.
- Manuela Velasco as Eugenia de Molina.
- Alberto San Juan as Víctor.
- Jorge Sanz as Trinidad.
- Manuel Manquiña as Emilio.
- Belén López as Puri.
- Gorka Otxoa as Zigor.
- Tina Sainz as Flora.
- María Pedroviejo as Anaís.
- Juan Fernández as conde de Lizana.
- Bárbara Lennie as Cristina Hernando.

† Denotes deceased character

== Awards and nominations ==
Year	Awards	Category	Nominated	Result
2009	Festival de Televisión y Cine Histórico de León	Best New Actor	Guillermo Campra	Won
2009	Festival de Cine y Televisión de Islantilla	Best Television Series	Águila Roja	Won
2009	Festival de Televisión y Radio de Vitoria	Premio Pasión de Críticos for best drama	Águila Roja	Won
2009	Premios TP de Oro	Best National Series	Águila Roja	Won
2009	Premios Unión de Actores	Best television supporting actress	Inma Cuesta	Nominated
2009	Premios ATV	Best fiction show	Águila Roja	Won
2009	Premios ATV	Best producer	Águila Roja	Won
2009	Premios ATV	Best make-up and characterization	Águila Roja	Won
2009	Premios ATV	Best art direction and set design	Águila Roja	Won
2009	Premios ATV	Best cinematography and lighting	Águila Roja	Won
2009	Premios ATV	Best music for television	Águila Roja	Nominated
2009	Premios CineyMás	Best new Spanish series	Águila Roja	Nominated
2010	New York International Independent Film and Video Festival	Silver Medal for Best Action and Adventure Series	Águila Roja	Won
2010	Rose d'Or	Best Multi-Platform Content	Águila Roja	Won
2010	Premios Ondas	Best National Television Series	Águila Roja	Won
2010	Premios Protagonistas	Television award	David Janer	Nominated
2010	Premios Fotogramas de Plata	Best television actor	David Janer	Nominated
2010	Premios Fotogramas de Plata	Best television actress	Inma Cuesta	Nominated
2010	Premios Unión de Actores	Best television supporting actor	Francis Lorenzo	Nominated
2010	Premios ALMA	Best television screenplay	Águila Roja	Nominated
2010	Premios TP de Oro	Best national series	Águila Roja	Won
2010	Premios TP de Oro	Best actor	David Janer	Nominated
2010	Premios CINE&TELE	Most watched show in Spain	Águila Roja	Won
2010	Premios ATV	Best fiction show	Águila Roja	Nominated
2010	Premios ATV	Best series actress	Inma Cuesta	Nominated
2010	Premios ATV	Best filming	Águila Roja	Nominated
2010	Premios ATV	Best make-up and characterization	Águila Roja	Nominated
2010	Premios ATV	Best art direction and set design	Águila Roja	Won
2010	Premios ATV	Best cinematography and lighting	Águila Roja	Won
2010	Premios ATV	Best music for television	Águila Roja	Nominated
2010	Premios CineyMás	Best national series	Águila Roja	Won
2010	Premios CineyMás	Best Spanish actor	David Janer	Won
2011	ACE Awards	Best characteristic	Francis Lorenzo	Won
2011	ACE Awards	Television personality of the year	Miryam Gallego	Won
2011	Premios Fotogramas de Plata	Best television actor	David Janer	Nominated
2011	Premios Fotogramas de Plata	Best television actress	Inma Cuesta	Won
2011	Premios Pétalo	Best actress	Inma Cuesta	Won
2011	Premios Kapital	Best fiction series	Águila Roja	Won
2011	Premios CineyMás	Best Spanish series	Águila Roja	Won
2011	Premios CineyMás	Best Spanish actor	David Janer	Won
2011	Premios CineyMás	Best Spanish actress	Miryam Gallego	Won
2011	Premios Pizquita Series	Best Spanish drama series	Águila Roja	Nominated
2011	Premios Pizquita Series	Best cast in Spanish series	Águila Roja	Nominated
2011	Premios Pizquita Series	Best female performance in Spanish drama series	Miryam Gallego	Won
2011	Premios Pizquita Series	Best soundtrack in Spanish series	Águila Roja	Won
2011	Premios Pizquita Series	Best fictional couple in Spanish series	Miryam Gallego & Francis Lorenzo	Nominated
2011	Premios TP de Oro	Best Spanish series	Águila Roja	Won
2011	Premios TP de Oro	Best actor	David Janer	Won
2011	Premios Unión de Actores	Best television main actor	Javier Gutiérrez	Won
2012	Premios CineyMás	Best Spanish series	Águila Roja	Won
2012	Premios CineyMás	Best Spanish main actor	David Janer	Won
2012	Premios CineyMás	Best Spanish main actress	Inma Cuesta	Won
2012	Premios CineyMás	Best Spanish supporting actor	Javier Gutiérrez	Won
2012	Premios CineyMás	Best Spanish supporting actress	Miryam Gallego	Won
2014	2nd MiM Series Awards	Best Actor	Javier Gutiérrez	Won
