= Alicia Borrachero =

Spanish actress

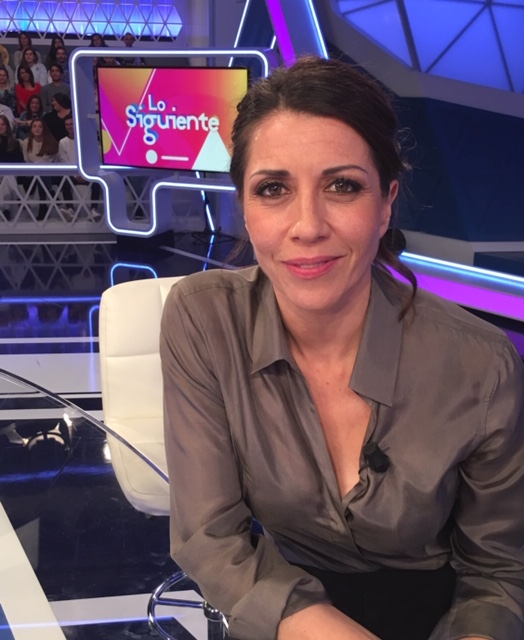
- Borrachero in 2018
- Born: Alicia Borrachero Bonilla; 14 February 1968 (age 57); Madrid, Spain
- Spouse: Ben Temple (m. 2003)
- Children: 1

Alicia Borrachero Bonilla (born 14 February 1968) is a Spanish actress. She became popular in Spain owing to her performance as Ana in television series Periodistas.

== Biography ==
Alicia Borrachero Bonilla was born on 14 February 1968 in Madrid, and studied at Colegio San Patricio. In 2003, she married actor Ben Temple, with whom she has had one child.

== Theatre ==
- Don Quixote
- Things I forgot to remember
- La fabulosa historia de Diego Marín
- Muerte en Granada
- Sangre Ciega
- The Killer Tongue
- Tres palabras
- Shooting Elizabeth

== Filmography ==
| Year | Title | Role | Notes | Ref. |
|---|---|---|---|---|
| 1992 | Shooting Elizabeth | Pillow Mint Maid | | |
| 1993 | Tres palabras | | Uncredited | |
| 1996 | La lengua asesina | Reporter | | |
| 1996 | The Disappearance of Garcia Lorca | Lydia | | |
| 1999 | Things I Forgot to Remember | Juanita | | |
| 2007 | Love in the Time of Cholera | Escolástica | | |
| 2008 | The Chronicles of Narnia: Prince Caspian | Queen Prunaprismia | | |
| 2010 | Vidas pequeñas | Mari Ángeles | | |
| 2016 | The Promise | Lena | | |
| 2019 | Terminator: Dark Fate | Alicia | Credited as Carl's Wife | |
| 2022 | La piel del tambor (The Man from Rome) | Gris Marsala | | |

| Year | Title | Role | Notes | Ref. |
|---|---|---|---|---|
| 1994 | Farmacia de guardia | Clara | Episode: "Con un par" | |
| 1995 | Hermanos de leche | | Episode: "El poder del dinero" | |
| 1996 | Médico de familia | Patricia | Episode: "La sorpresa" | |
| 1998–2002 | Periodistas | Ana Ruiz | 120 episodes | |
| 1999 | 7 vidas | Carmen | Episode: "Casanegra" | |
| 2003 | Un lugar en el mundo | Berta | 2 episodes | |
| 2003–2011 | Hospital central | Dra. Cruz Gándara | 83 episodes | |
| 2011 | Crematorio | Silvia Bertomeu | | |
| 2013 | Isabel | Aixa | Introduced in season 2 | |
| 2014 | Los Misterios de Laura | Julia de Miguel and Eva de Miguel | 1 episode | |
| 2017 | Tiempos de guerra (Morocco: Love in Times of War) | Carmen Angoloti | | |
| 2019 | The Spanish Princess | Queen Isabella | | |
