= Esther Regina =

Spanish actress

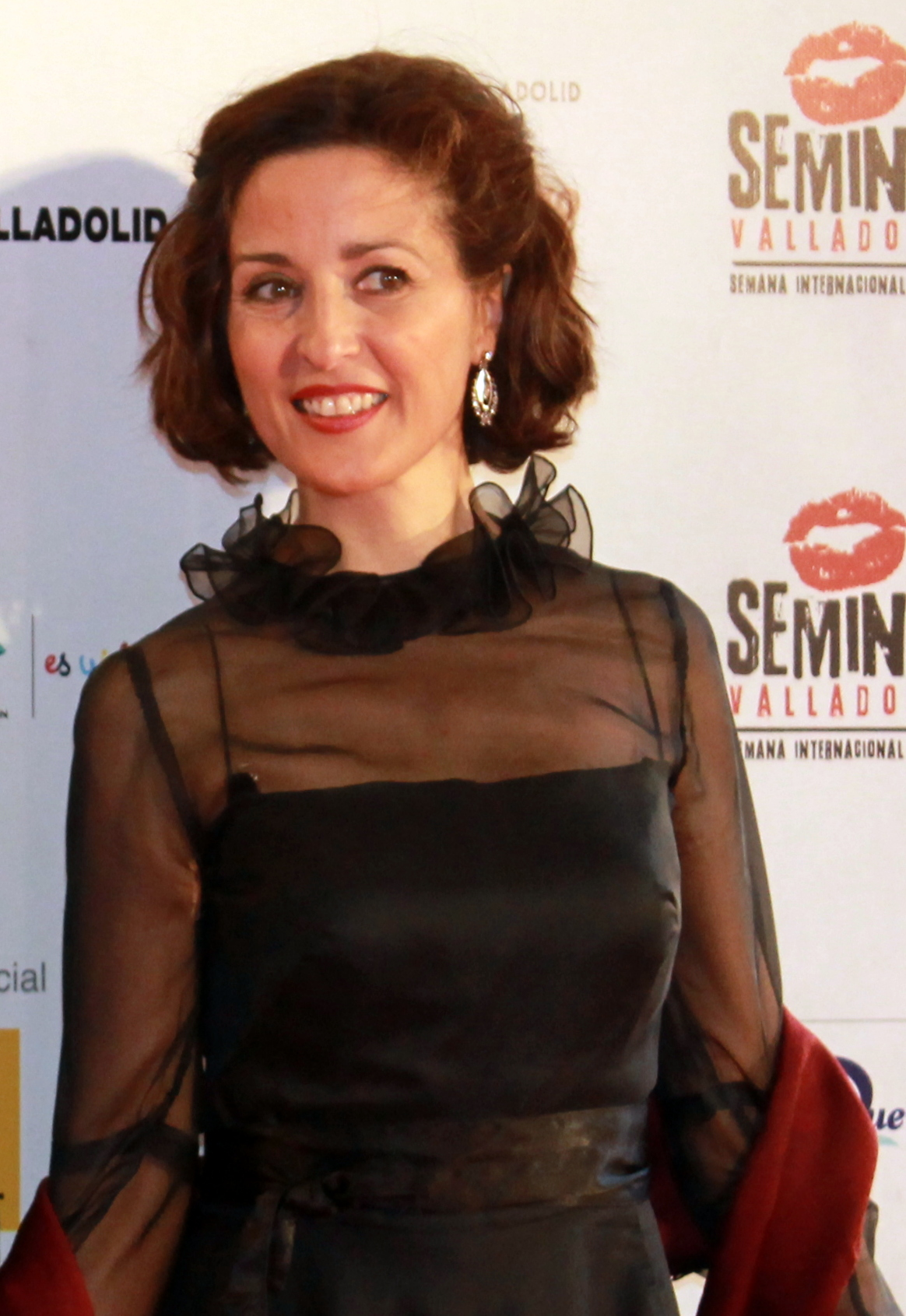
- Regina in 2012
- Born: Esther Regina Diaz Soto; Madrid, Spain
- Occupation: Actress

Esther Regina is a Spanish actress.

== Biography ==
Esther Regina studied Dramatic Arts in Brussels. She holds a university degree in French Philology. Her training and experience in several countries has strengthened her career and she has been awarded acting roles in Spanish, French, German, Italian and English. She has pursued training in theatre, voice and dance. After her graduation at the Universidad Complutense de Madrid she furthered her studies at the universities of Sorbonne, Grenoble, and Metz (France), and Saarland (Germany). She worked as a translator for the European Parliament in Luxembourg and later in Brussels, again for the European Union, where she acted for years with the Teatro Español de Bruselas, being one of its founding members along with director Pollux Hernúñez.

Since her return to Spain, Regina has worked in theatre, television and films for directors including Lucas Fernández and Sigfrid Monleón. In the film Ispansi!, directed by Carlos Iglesias, she played the protagonist.

Regina has acted in numerous television series such as Moon, Calenda's mystery, with Belén Rueda.

== Sources ==
- Esther Regina at IMDb
- Esther Regina on blogspot
- youtume
- Google video
- telinco.es
- diariodesevilla.es
- elpais.com
- google.com
