= David Janer =

Spanish actor

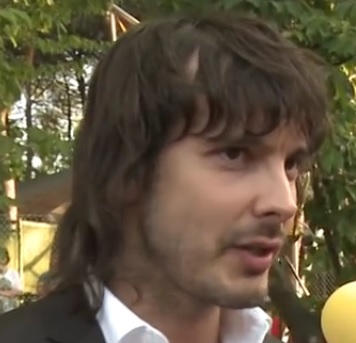
- Janer in 2012
- Born: David Janer Oliveras; 5 May 1973 (age 52); Granollers, Barcelona, Spain
- Occupation: Actor
- Years active: 2000–present

David Janer (born 5 May 1973) is a Spanish actor.

== Television ==
- Laberint d'ombres (2000) - Óscar
- Des del balcó (2001) - Ignasi Costa
- Temps de silenci (2001) - Roger
- Compañeros (2001-2002) - Martín Bermejo
- 16 dobles (2002) - Roger Gutiérrez
- De moda (2004) - Carlos
- El cor de la ciutat (2004) - Álex Benito Andrade
- Mesa para cinco (2006) - Raúl, violin teacher
- Mar de fons (2006) - Carles Revert
- Cuenta atrás (Countdown) (capítulo "Instituto Bretón") - Alfredo Solís, literature professor
- Los hombres de Paco (2007) - Inspector Carlos Pacheco, internal affairs
- Águila Roja (2009–2016) - Gonzalo de Montalvo / Águila Roja

== Cinema ==
- Atrapa-la (2000), de Dominic Harari y Teresa Pelegri - Bernat
- Anita no pierde el tren (Anita Takes a Chance) (2001), de Ventura Pons - boy supermarket
- L'Escala de diamants (2003), de Jordi Marcos - Sebas
- Iris TV (2003), de Xavier Manich - Ariel
- Entre vivir y soñar (2004), de Alfonso Albacete and David Menkes - Pierre
- Los girasoles ciegos (The Blind Sunflowers) (2008), de Jose Luis Cuerda - Falangist
- Águila Roja: la película (2011), de José Ramón Ayerra y Daniel Écija - Gonzalo de Montalvo / Águila Roja

== Music ==
- San Pedro de Revólver

== Theatre ==
- El manuscrito del teniente.
- La enfermedad de la juventud.
- El sueño de una noche de verano (A Midsummer Night's Dream) (1998-1999).
- Celobert (2002-2004).
- Tape (2004).

== Awards and nominations ==
Fotogramas de Plata

Year	Category	Movie / series	Result
2010	Best TV actor	Águila Roja	nominated

Premios Protagonistas

Year	Category	Movie / series	Result
2010	Televisión	Águila Roja	Winner

TP de Oro

Year	Category	Series	Result
2001	Actor	Compañeros	nominated
2010	Actor	Águila Roja	nominated
2011	Actor	Águila Roja	Winner

Premios CineyMás

Year	Category	Movie / series	Result
2010/2011	Mejor actor	Águila Roja	Winner
