= A House on the Outskirts =

- Theatrical release poster
- Spanish: Una casa en las afueras
- Directed by: Pedro Costa
- Screenplay by: José Ángel Esteban; Carlos López
- Produced by: Enrique Cerezo; Pedro Costa; Carlos Vasallo
- Starring: Juan Echanove; Emma Suárez; Tania Henche; Asunción Balaguer; Susi Sánchez; Lydia Bosch
- Cinematography: Federico Ribes
- Edited by: Esperanza Cobos
- Music by: Alberto Iglesias
- Production companies: Pedro Costa PC; Atrium Productions
- Distributed by: Columbia TriStar Films de España
- Release date: 8 September 1995
- Country: Spain
- Language: Spanish

A House on the Outskirts (Spanish: Una casa en las afueras) is a 1995 Spanish romantic psychological thriller film directed by Pedro Costa from a screenplay by Carlos López and José Ángel Esteban starring Emma Suárez and Juan Echanove alongside Tania Henche, Asunción Balaguer, Susi Sánchez, and Lydia Bosch.

== Plot ==
The plot explores the relationship between single mother Yolanda and seemingly affable man Daniel. As they install in an isolated house, the aforementioned relationship becomes overwhelming and threatening due to Daniel's past.

== Cast ==
- Juan Echanove as Daniel
- Emma Suárez as Yolanda
- Tania Henche as Patricia
- Asunción Balaguer as madre
- Susi Sánchez as Teresa
- Lydia Bosch as Blanca
- Tony Isbert as comisario
- Ana Labordeta as Marta
- Saturnino García as jefe de obra
- Maite Blasco as madre superiora

== Production ==
The film was produced by Pedro Costa PC and Atrium Productions. It boasted a 200 million ₧ budget. It was primarily shot in a country house near Valdenuño Fernández, with some footage also shot in Denia.

== Release ==
The film was released theatrically on 8 September 1995.

== Reception ==
Augusto Martínez Torres of El País described the film as "a sort of a complex exercise in style which does not quite work as it should due to various reasons".

== See also ==
- List of Spanish films of 1995
