= Denisse Peña =

Spanish actress (born 1999)

Denisse Peña Molina
- Born: November 19, 1999 (age 26); Madrid, Spain
- Occupation: Actress
- Years active: 2007–present

Denisse Peña Molina (born 19 November 1999 in Madrid) is a Spanish actress. She has appeared in the Spanish drama-thriller television series El Internado and the Spanish police drama Servir y proteger.

== Biography ==
Denisse Peña Molina's first acting role was in a Toys "R" Us commercial when she was a child. In subsequent years, she continued to appear in various commercials. However, her first significant role was that of Evelyn Pons in the series El internado, which aired between 2007 and 2010 on the Spanish TV channel Antena 3. Also in 2010, she appeared in the short film 2 metros cuadrados.

In 2014 she played Daniela in the series Bienvenidos al Lolita, also on Antena 3, and appeared in the movie Pancho, el perro millonario, alongside Patricia Conde and Iván Massagué.

In October 2014, she received a best actress award for the short film Nena at Cineculpable, an international film festival in Vila-real. In November 2015, she received another best actress award for the same film at a short film festival in Paracuellos de Jarama.

In 2017 she announced her involvement in several episodes of a new television series on La 1, iFamily, in the role of Patricia. She also joined the cast of Servir y proteger (Serve and Protect), a new daily drama, in the role of Olga, the daughter of Claudia (Luisa Martín) and Antonio (Roberto Álvarez). Two years and more than 400 episodes later, she left the series in the middle of its third season. Starting in February 2020, she returned to the series.

In 2019 she signed on to the series Néboa in the role of Ana Galmán alongside Emma Suárez and Nancho Novo. In June of the same year she also signed on to the fifth and final season of the series Las chicas del cable (Cable Girls), which was released on Netflix. She played the role of Sofía, the daughter of Ángeles (Maggie Civantos) and Mario (Sergio Mur).

== Filmography ==
=== Television ===
Year	Title	Role	Channel	Notes
2007–2010	El internado	Evelyn Pons	Antena 3	71 episodes
2014	Bienvenidos al Lolita	Daniela	Antena 3	6 episodes
2016	Centro médico	María	La 1	1 episode
2017	iFamily	Patricia	La 1	5 episodes
2017–2020	Servir y proteger	Olga Torres Miralles	La 1	456 episodes
2020	Néboa	Ana Galmán Seoane	La 1	8 episodes
2020	Cable Girls	Sofía Pérez Vidal	Netflix	10 episodes
2024	Una vida menos en Canarias	Daniela Torrecilla	Atresplayer	1 episode
2024	4 estrellas	Desiré Vargas Losada	La 1	81 episodes
2024	Desde el mañana	Emma Velasco Aizpúrua	Disney+	8 episodes
2025	La agencia	Laura Rivera	Telecinco	13 episodes

=== Films ===
Year	Title	Role	Director
2014	Pancho, el perro millonario	Claudia	Tom Fernández
2016	No culpes al karma de lo que te pasa por gilipollas (Don't Blame it on your Karma)	Fan at a concert	María Ripoll

=== Short films ===
Year	Title	Role
2010	2 metros cuadrados	—
2014	NENA	Ana
