= Vacas =

1992 film directed by Julio Médem

- Film Poster
- Directed by: Julio Médem
- Written by: Julio Médem; Michel Gaztambide
- Starring: Carmelo Gómez; Emma Suárez; Ana Torrent; Karra Elejalde; Txema Blasco
- Cinematography: Carles Gusi
- Music by: Alberto Iglesias
- Distributed by: Columbia TriStar Films de España
- Release date: 26 February 1992 (Spain)
- Running time: 96 minutes
- Country: Spain
- Language: Spanish

Vacas (English: Cows) is a 1992 Spanish film written and directed by Julio Médem. The film stars Carmelo Gómez, Emma Suárez, Ana Torrent, and Karra Elejalde. An eerie family saga set in rural Basque Country, the cryptic film follows the intertwined story of three generations of two families from 1875 to 1936. It was Médem's first film and for it he won the 1993 Goya Award as Best New Director.

== Plot ==
Fighting in the trenches of Biscay in 1875 during the Third Carlist War, Carmelo Mendiluze, an army sergeant, learns from a young errand boy named Ilegorri that Manuel Iriguíbel, his neighbor from his native village, has joined their exhausted battalion. Eager for news of his child's birth, Carmelo befriends the inexperienced soldier whose reputation as an expert aizcolari (competition log cutter) cannot conceal his apprehension and fear of armed combat. Panicking under fire, Manuel drops to the ground and smears himself with blood gushing hot from the neck of his mortally wounded neighbor, Mendiluze. When the battle is over, Manuel crawls out from a cartload of the dead, naked bodies as he is transported away from the front lines. Nobody has seen his escape, except a curious, solitary cow.

Thirty years later, in 1905 in rural Guipúzcoa, a lingering animosity has continued between the Mendiluze and Iriguíbel families. Manuel, now an old man, is still regarded as a coward; he spends his time painting the family's cows watched over by his three granddaughters, the offspring of his son Ignacio Iriguíbel and his wife Madalen. Ignacio and Carmelo's son, Juan Mendiluze, have maintained family traditions by honing their skills as aizcolari. Despite the strained relations between the neighbors, the destinies of the two families are fatefully interconnected. Juan's sister, Catalina, cannot conceal her romantic interest for Ignacio as she furtively watches him practice cutting logs in the woods - an attraction that proves to be mutual through Ignacio's playful attempts to catch her already piqued attention. Paulina, the Mendiluze widow, warns her daughter that her interest for Ignacio Iriguíbel will bring the downfall of the Mendiluze family. In an attempt to capitalize from the rivalry between the two families, Ilegorri, now a grown man, arranges a waged competition between Ignacio and Juan. Ignacio wins and his career as an aizcolari contender is launched. Catalina and Ignacio start a secret affair.

Ten years later, in the spring of 1915, Ignacio returns home after traveling to national competitions. He now enjoys fame and success. Although Ignacio takes care of his family farm, he neglects Madalen, his wife. He is promptly reunited with Catalina, and they have a ten-year-old son. After the death of their mother, the relationship between the bitter Juan and Catalina is increasingly strained. Juan, still a bachelor, is more obsessed and delusional in his incestuous feelings for his sister. Catalina, afraid of him, wants to escape to America with Ignacio. A close childhood friendship develops between Peru, Catalina and Ignacio's ten-year-old illegitimate son, and his half-sister Cristina; they wander amidst the mountain forest under the supervision of their limp and old grandfather, Manuel. Eventually the boy's parents elope to America and take him with them.

In the summer of 1936, Peru has left his family behind, coming back to Guipúzcoa, as a photojournalist reporting on the Spanish Civil War. The Mendiluze farmhouse is empty. Juan, his uncle, has put on his Carlist red beret, joining the Nationalists. Peru is reunited with Cristina, his half-sister and childhood sweetheart. He stays at the Iriguíbel's farm. Cristina has had a relationship with Lucas, Iligorri's son. She shows Peru the last paintings made by their grandfather. The Spanish Civil War comes to the village. The men try to find refuge in the forest when the Nationalists come. Peru and Cristina follow them and are joined by Lucas, who offers to protect them. Lucas is killed and Peru is captured with the surviving men of the region. The men are executed but Peru is spared thanks to the intervention of Juan who recognizes him as his nephew. Reunited with Cristina, Peru and Cristina flee to the French frontier.

== Cast ==
Director Julio Médem illustrates the cyclical nature of the unresolved strife and vacillating alliance between the two rival families in the film by using the same actor to portray generations of characters. The actor Carmelo Gómez's plays the cowardly Manuel Iriguíbel in the Carlist Wars, Manuel's son Ignacio in 1905, and eventually, the matured photographer, Peru Mendiluze, who returns the Basque region at the onset of the Spanish Civil War in 1936. Kandido Uranga plays first the doomed Carmelo Mendiluze in 1875 and then Carmelo's obsessive and haunted son Juan in the other three segments of the film. Karra Elejade plays both Ilegorri and Ilegorri's son Lucas.

Médem cast Carmelo Gómez in his next two films: La ardilla roja (The Red Squirrel), 1993) and Tierra (Earth), 1996) pairing him in both cases with Emma Suárez like here in Vacas.

- Carmelo Gómez - Manuel/ Ignacio / Peru
- Emma Suárez - Cristina
- Ana Torrent - Catalina
- Karra Elejalde - Ilegorri / Lucas
- Txema Blasco - Manuel as an old man
- Kandido Uranga - Carmelo / Juan
- Klara Badiola - Madalen
- Pilar Bardem - Paulina

== Overview ==
Usually categorized as rural drama, the film narrates the lives of two Basque families covering the years 1875–1936, which historically were the unstable and bloody years from the Third Carlist War to the Spanish Civil War. To help the non-Spanish viewer understand the history depicted in the film: the Basques allied themselves initially with the Carlists (who were right-wing) but later with the Spanish Republic (who were left-wing) because, in each case, they were promised local autonomy.

Small segments of Vacas were used by Medem in his documentary film La pelota vasca to illustrate the Carlist Wars.

== Reception ==
Vacas was well received and proved an auspicious debut for Julio Médem, the director. Critics hailed Médem's craftsmanship and ability to marry the right images with his near mythic story lines. It was very successful and won the Goya Award of the Spanish academy for best new director and prizes in the festivals of Tokyo, Turin and Alexandria.

== Analysis ==
The aesthetics of the movie established strongly Médem's so-called "dreamy style" (which ironically can be very nightmarish). His expressionist values would contrast rapidly with a time period in the Spanish cinema when the influences from the American movies would multiply (i.e. Alejandro Amenábar). The structure of Vacas is made up of concentric circles: European Style—Spanish History—Basque culture—A village—Two houses of that village and, overseeing them all, the cows. The narrative is also very concentric; the film uses a continuous recycling recourse (i.e. the same actors play the three generations, which can be slightly confusing). Médem would also use a loop-like approach in his film Los amantes del círculo polar.

Médem subverts the conventions of the family saga by replacing the human subjectivity of conventional melodrama and historical epics with a diffidence about life and death that is expressed through the uninterested gaze of the cows. The title of the film refers to the passive omnipresence of cows. The political and social climate of the Basque country of Spain is constantly in flux, yet the cows of the region are steadfast and calm, observing the unusual changing human culture without reaction. Instead of a society that is traditionally presented as oppressed and belittle by exterior forces, Vacas presents the Basque people as a race that, in petty rivalries, civil war and incest, has consumed itself from within. Most characters wish for nothing more than to escape the supposed idyll of the Basque Country, though those who do are fated to return and suffer the consequences of inescapable roots and blood ties. Médem further illustrates the cyclical nature of the unresolved strife and vacillating alliance by using the same actor to portray generations of characters. Instead of typifying the beauty of the land, the mist of the basque Valley create a malignant atmosphere that enshrouds the protagonists of Vacas, stimulating and manifesting their latent desires and urges.

== DVD release ==
The film was released on DVD on 29 January 2002 in the U.S. by Vanguard Cinema and in Spain by Sogepaq Video in 2002(Universal Pictures Home Entertainment) and 2007(20th Century Fox Home Entertainment and in Blu-ray in Spain on March 16, 2016, by 20th Century Fox Home Entertainment(via Video Mercury Films, who bought Sogepaq/Sogetel library in 2009) Is released previous in VHS by C.B. Films in Spain in 1992 . The film is in Spanish with English subtitles.
