= Txema Blasco =

Spanish actor (1941–2024)

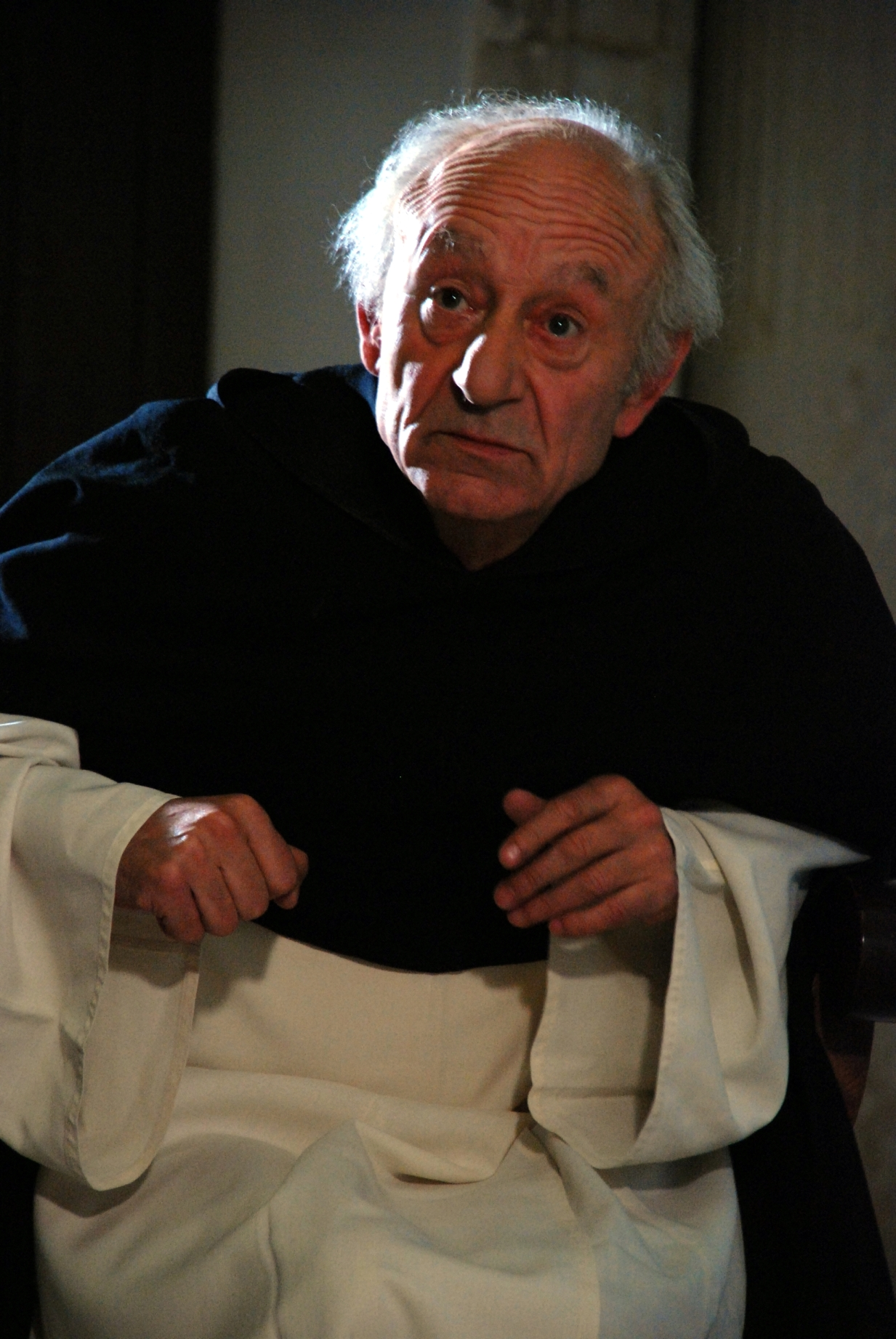
- Blasco in 2007
- Born: José María Blasco Echeguren; 13 July 1941; Vitoria (now Vitoria-Gasteiz), Spain
- Died: 28 June 2024 (aged 82); Condado de Treviño, Burgos, Spain
- Occupation: Actor
- Years active: 1954–2021

José María Blasco Echeguren (13 July 1941 – 28 June 2024), better known as Txema Blasco, was a Spanish actor known mainly for his work in film and television.

== Early life ==
Born in the early days of General Francisco Franco's dictatorship, Blasco went to primary school at the Samaniego and Jesús Obrero de Vitoria colleges. While studying at college, and for several years, he formed part of the clown duo of Hermanos Chetti ("Brothers Chetti") together with Tito Aldama, making a total of 4,316 appearances.

After his mother's death when Blasco was thirteen years old, he went out to work at the age of 14 at Aranzabal as a bellboy, combining it with his studies for a secondary-level diploma, and in psychology and business, years later becoming the company's accountant. At the same time he formed part of the theatrical groups La Farándula, Gasteiz or Arlequín.

== Career ==
In 1966, Blasco took part in the Álava provincial government's Amateur Cinema Division, filming a great many short films, participating in the 1970s in El sacamantecas ("The Bogeyman"), directed by Jesús del Val, and in José Ramón Aguirrezabal's En el cura alavés ("In the Álava Clergyman").

In the 1980s, he took part in the film La fuga de Segovia ("The Segovia Prison Break" — based on an actual event in 1976), directed by Imanol Uribe, and in Montxo Armendáriz's film Tasio. After acting in Tasio, Blasco worked in three short films by the same director, Pello Varela, foremost among which was Coja usted el siguiente ("Take the Next One"), selected in the 1986 San Sebastián International Film Festival, until in 1991 he once again appeared in a feature-length film by Enrique Urbizu: Todo por la pasta (released in English under the title "Anything for Bread"). From this time forth, Blasco's career was heavily bound to the cinema, and he repeatedly worked with more than one director, Julio Medem, Pello Varela or Montxo Armendáriz.

In 1992, he gave up his accountant's job at Aranzabal to give himself over wholly to his acting career, taking part in this decade in Alas de mariposa ("Butterfly Wings"), Vacas ("Cows"), Los años oscuros ("The Dark Years"), La ardilla roja ("The Red Squirrel"), Cómo ser infeliz y disfrutarlo ("How to Be Unhappy and Enjoy It"), Sálvate si puedes ("Save Yourself If You Can"), Salto al vacío ("Jump into the Void") or Cuernos de mujer ("Woman's Horns").

Blasco alternated his cinematic appearances with television projects such as Del Miño al Bidasoa ("From the Minho to the Bidasoa"), El joven Picasso ("The Young Picasso"), Pepa y Pepe, Colegio Mayor ("Residential College"), Más que amigos ("More Than Friends"), Blasco Ibáñez, la novela de su vida ("Blasco Ibáñez, the Novel of His Life"), La virtud del asesino ("The Murderer's Virtue") and Médico de familia ("Family Doctor").

In the 2000s, Blasco appeared in the films Maestros, Leo, Aunque tú no lo sepas (literally "Although You Never Knew It", but entitled "What You Never Knew" in English) and Para que no me olvides (literally "So That You Don't Forget Me", but entitled "Something to Remember Me By" in English), and in various series such as Paraíso, Robles, investigador, Policías, en el corazón de la calle, Un lugar en el mundo, Hospital Central and TVE's Cuéntame cómo pasó, in which he spent three years.

In the 2010s, Blasco appeared in many television series, among which were Águila Roja, Los misterios de Laura, Gran Hotel, Aída, Con el culo al aire and Rabia. He also appeared on the big screen in films such as Vidas pequeñas ("Little Lives"), Que baje Dios y lo vea ("Let God Come Down and See It") and Lo nunca visto ("That Which is Never Seen").

== Later years ==
In the 2020s, Blasco participated in fewer projects, retiring in 2021. In 2020, he received the Celedón de Oro, awarded by Vitoria-Gasteiz city council in recognition of the actor's extensive professional career. (Celedón is a modern legendary figure in Vitoria-Gasteiz). Throughout all his years as an actor, Blasco took part in 103 television series, 82 feature-length films and 167 short films, making him the Spanish actor who has appeared in the most short films. He also directed 28 works and two zarzuelas.

After having health problems in his later years, he went to live at the Sagrada Familia nursing home in Cucho, in the Province of Burgos.

== Death ==
Blasco died in Condado de Treviño, Burgos on 28 June 2024, at the age of 82. He was divorced. Blasco had four children, Marta, Óscar, Yoset and Gaizka, and five grandchildren, Javier, Íñigo, Aimar, Uxue and Aiala.

== Works ==
=== Filmography (incomplete list) ===
Year	Title	Character	Director	Notes
1979	El sacamantecas	–	Jesús del Val and Juan Carlos Ruiz de Gordoa	Feature-length
1981	La fuga de Segovia	Judge	Imanol Uribe	Feature-length
1986	Coja usted al siguiente	Juana Gorri	Pello Varela	Short
1987	A los cuatro vientos	Manolo	José A. Zorrilla	Feature-length
1987	Azpiko Gizona	Sergeant	Pello Varela	Short
1987	Aquel mundo de Jon	–	Aitor Mantxola	Short
1988	Bi, marra berean	–	Pello Varela	Short
1989	Eskorpion	Orbea	Ernesto Tellería	Feature-length
1989	Akixo	–	Juanma Bajo Ulloa	Short
1991	Todo por la pasta	Carajaula	Enrique Urbizu	Feature-length
1991	Alas de mariposa	Grandfather	Juanma Bajo Ulloa	Feature-length
1992	Vacas	Manuel	Julio Medem	Feature-length
1992	Los años oscuros	–	Arantxa Lazkano	Feature-length
1993	La ardilla roja	Chief of Neurology	Julio Medem	Feature-length
1993	Mirage	Víctor	Michael Aguiló	Short
1993	Y creó en el nombre del padre	–	Óscar del Caz	Short
1994	Cómo ser infeliz y disfrutarlo	Maldonado	Enrique Urbizu	Feature-length
1994	La canción de Valhia	–	Óscar del Caz	Short
1995	Sálvate si puedes	Maître	Joaquín Trincado	Feature-length
1995	Salto al vacío	Judge 1	Daniel Calparsoro	Feature-length
1995	Cuernos de mujer	Lawyer	Enrique Urbizu	Feature-length
1995	Morirás en Chafarinas	Colonel	Pedro Olea	Feature-length
1995	Belmonte	Luis Rozalem	Juan Sebastián Bollaín	Feature-length
1995	Adiós Toby, adiós	Grandfather	Ramón Barea	Short
1995	Sirenas	Grandfather	Fernando León de Aranoa	Short
1995	El disco	King	Juan Luis Jiménez de No and Miguel Marichalar Aranzadi	Short
1995	Hotel y domicilio	Court policeman	Ernesto del Río	Feature-length
1995	...Que ciento volando	–	José García Hernández	Short
1996	Cachito	Don Cayetano	Enrique Urbizu	Feature-length
1996	Canela que tú me dieras	–	Gustavo Ferrada	Short
1996	Tierra	Tomás	Julio Medem	Feature-length
1996	Agurra	Grandfather	Iñaki Elizalde	Short
1996	El buscador	Clergyman	Damián Rubio	Short
1996	Menos que cero	Goyo	Ernesto Tellería	Feature-length
1996	Ya no me acuerdo	Grandfather	Morrosko Vila San Juan	Short
1996	Sabor latino	Marcial	Pedro Carvajal	Feature-length
1996	Tabarka	Brother Casanovas	Domingo Rodes	Feature-length
1996	Adiós prisión	Cerebro	Michael Aguiló	Short
1996	Urgencia	Gentleman 1	José Luis Serrano	Short
1997	Hazlo por mí	Antonio Robles	Ángel Fernández Santos	Feature-length
1997	Suerte	Father	Ernesto Tellería	Feature-length
1997	La fabulosa historia de Diego Marín	Grandfather	Fidel Cordero	Feature-length
1997	Planeta extraño	Don José	Pedro Pérez Jiménez	Short
1997	Cien maneras de hacer el pollo al txilindrón	Setero	Kepa Sojo	Short
1997	Todos a tus pies	Don Eulogio	Gustavo Ferrada	Short
1997	La gentileza de los desconocidos	Walberg	Luis M. Alonso	Short
1998	Manos de seda	Antique dealer	César Martínez Herrada	Feature-length
1998	La vuelta de El Coyote	Official	Mario Camus	Feature-length
1998	Atilano, presidente	Esteve	Santiago Aguilar and Luis Guridi	Feature-length
1998	La hora de los valientes	Teacher's brother-in-law	Antonio Mercero	Feature-length
1998	Feliz Navidad	Wise Man	Óscar del Caz	Short
1998	María	Grandfather	Jesús Solera	Short
1999	Rincones del paraíso	Client 2	Carlos Pérez Merinero	Feature-length
1999	Las huellas borradas	Eutimio	Enrique Gabriel	Feature-length
1999	Patesnak, un cuento de Navidad	Old man	Iñaki Elizalde	Short
1999	Lorca	Grandfather	Iñaki Elizalde	Short
1999	Cuando vuelvas a mi lado	Emilio	Gracia Querejeta	Feature-length
1999	Pídele cuentas al rey	Man with beret	José Antonio Quirós	Feature-length
1999	El beso de la tierra	José	Lucinda Torre	Short
1999	Ángel	–	Pablo Cantos	Short
1999	Mi Rosita	Manolo	Ángeles Diemant-Hartz	Short
1999	Elena	–	Jesús García-Soler	Short
2000	Maestros	–	Óscar del Caz	Feature-length
2000	Leo	Don Miguel	José Luis Borau	Feature-length
2000	Aunque tú no lo sepas	Benito	Juan Vicente Córdoba	Feature-length
2000	El viaje de Arián	Arián's father	Eduardo Bosch	Feature-length
2000	La gran vida	–	Antonio Cuadri	Feature-length
2000	La escapada	Pepe	David Gallart	Short
2000	Anoche soñé que habías muerto	Vagabond	Javier Marmolejo	Short
2000	Nada	–	David Abajo, David Fernández and Luis Santamaría Morales	Short
2000	Viaje de ida y vuelta	–	Nuria Cabestany	Feature-length
2000	Roso	–	César Fernández Jiménez	Short
2001	Carne de gallina	Luisón	Javier Maqua	Feature-length
2002	El refugio del mal	Mr. Santos	Félix Cábez	Feature-length
2003	Pacto de brujas	Liceo	Javier Elorrieta	Feature-length
2003	Se buscan abrazos	Inocencio	Manuel García Serrano	Short
2003	El misterio Galíndez	Ricardo's uncle	Gerardo Herrero y Leigh Romero	Feature-length
2003	Niebla	Juan	Mónica Alonso	Short
2003	Crédito cero	–	Rubén Salazar	Feature-length
2003	Historia de un puñal	Priest	Joan Ayllón	Short
2004	Muertos comunes	Huete's neighbour	Norberto Ramos del Val	Feature-length
2004	Matar al ángel	Rabbi	Daniel Múgica	Feature-length
2004	Un héroe de acción	–	Gorka Losada	Short
2005	Para que no me olvides	Julián	Patricia Ferreira	Feature-length
2005	Obaba	Tomás	Montxo Armendáriz	Feature-length
2005	Somne	Marquina	Isidro Ortiz	Feature-length
2005	Mala sombra	Trainer Robles	Miguel Ángel Escudero	Short
2005	La doctora sonrisas	Inocencio, King	Manuel García Serrano	Short
2005	Se vende	–	Carlos López Martínez	Short
2006	El síndrome de Svensson	Little old man	Kepa Sojo	Feature-length
2006	Las locuras de Don Quijote	Don Quijote	Rafael Alcázar	Feature-length
2006	No me gustan los peces de colores	–		Short
2007	La mosquita muerta	Narrator	Imanol Rayo	Short
2007	Shevernatze: Una epopeya marcha atrás	Penderling	Pablo Palazón	Feature-length
2007	2 rivales casi iguales	Don Jaime	Miguel Ángel Calvo Buttini	Feature-length
2007	Salomón	Eusebio	Ignacio Lasierra	Short
2007	Le protecteur	Paranoiac 3	Patxi Basabe	Short
2008	Road Spain	–	Jordi Vidal	–
2008	Verde de otoño	Bruno	Eduardo H. Garza	Short
2008	Todos estamos invitados	Azcoaga	Manuel Gutiérrez Aragón	Feature-length
2008	Imaginario	Client	Pablo Cantos	Short
2008	Cenizas del cielo	Manolo	José Antonio Quirós	Feature-length
2008	El embaucador	Elderly man	Daniel Romero	Short
2009	Lo que dura la eternidad	Father	Toño Martín	Short
2009	La culona	Román	Polo Menárguez	Short
2009	Siempre hay tiempo	Héctor	Ana Rosa Diego	Feature-length
2010	Llueve sobremojado	Luis	Joan Álvarez	Short
2010	La vida fluye	Indigent	Toñi Martín	Short
2010	Morir cada día	–	Aitor Echeverría	Short
2010	Vidas pequeñas	Gumersindo	Enrique Gabriel	Feature-length
2010	Jaque	Miguel	Íker Franco	Vídeo
2010	Sólo palabras	Father	Yolanda Mulero	Short
2010	Bisarmes	Güelo	Francisco Martínez and Pablo A. Quiroga	Short
2011	8	Grandfather	Raúl Cerezo	Short
2011	Posturas	Casimiro	Álvaro Oliva	Short
2011	Lección debida	Alejandro	Iván Ruiz Flores	Feature-length
2011	Jugando con la muerte	Grandfather Eusebio	Paul Urkijo Alijo	Short
2011	Área de descanso	Grandfather	Michael Aguiló	Feature-length
2011	Un cuento de pocas palabras	Emilio	Daniel Cortázar	Short
2012	Baztán	Don Gregorio	Iñaki Elizalde	Feature-length
2012	Chan Chan	Ramón	Pilar Palomero	Short
2013	Caminante	Santiago	Joaquín Calderón	Short
2014	Objetos perdidos	Don Manuel	Álvaro Oliva	Short
2014	Estado de bienestar	–	Jorge Calvo	Short
2014	Agur	Grandfather	David Pérez Sañudo	Short
2015	Broken Basket	–	Roberto Ruiz Céspedes	Short
2015	El audífono	Fernando	Samuel Quiles Palop	Short
2015	El bosque negro	–	Paul Urkijo Alijo	Short
2016	Agustín	Manolo	Javier Celay	Short
2016	Las mujeres de Cervantes	Cervantes	Rafael Alcázar	–
2016	El andar del borracho	Fidel	Pol Armengol	Short
2016	Cefalea	Marcelino	María Sánchez Testón	Short
2016	249. La noche en que una becaria encontró a Emiliano Revilla	Emiliano Revilla	Luis María Ferrández	Feature-length
2017	Que baje Dios y lo vea	Father Huerto	Curro Velázquez	Feature-length
2018	Tournees	Radio manager	Israel González	Short
2018	Ola de crímenes	Andoni's father	Gracia Querejeta	Feature-length
2019	Lo nunca visto	Paco	Marina Seresesky	Feature-length
2019	Stalingrado	Iñaki	Amaia San Sebastián	Short
2019	El silencio de la ciudad blanca	Don Tiburcio	Daniel Calparsoro	Feature-length
2020	El frontón más largo del mundo	Maestro	Luis Alberto Cabezón	Short
2021	Polvo somos	–	Estibaliz Urresola Solaguren	Short

=== Television (incomplete list) ===
Year	Title	Character	Channel	Notes
1990	Del Miño al Bidasoa	–	La 1	Miniseries. 1×04
1993	El joven Picasso	–	Canal Sur, ETB2, Canal Nou, TVG and TV3	Miniseries. 1×01 and 1×04
1994	Terranova	Castro	ETB2, TVG and TV3	Series
1995	Pepa y Pepe	Luis	La 1	Series. 2×05
1996	Colegio Mayor	Millán	ETB2, Canal Nou and La 1	Series. 2×03
1997	Más que amigos	Bea's father	Telecinco	Series. 1×07
1998, 2000–2001	Periodistas	Mario (1×08), Isidoro (5×08) and Florentino Iglesias (7×01)	Telecinco	Series
1998	Blasco Ibáñez, la novela de su vida	Campus judge	La 1	Miniseries. 1×01, parte 1
1998	La virtud del asesino	–	La 2	Series. 1×09
1998	Entre naranjos	Dr. Moreno	La 1	Miniseries. 1×01-1×02
1998	A las once en casa	–	La 1	Series. 1×21
1998	La vida en el aire	Luis	La 2	Series. 1×03
1998	Ni contigo ni sin ti	Dr. Garañón	La 1	Series. 1×10-1×11
1998	Entre dos fuegos	Marcial	ETB2	Series. 1×07
1998	Hermanas	–	Telecinco	Series. 2×07
1999	La casa de los líos	Braulio	Antena 3	Series. 4×11
1999, 2002 and 2008	El comisario	Kidnap victim (1×04), 4×10, Mr. Silva (5×09) and 12×11	Telecinco	Series
1999	Puerta con puerta	–	La 1	Series. 1×10
1999	Médico de familia	–	Telecinco	Series. 9×08
2000	Junts	Carlos	–	Made-for-TV film
2000–2001	Policías, en el corazón de la calle	Clergyman (1×08-1×09) and El Pelusa (4×01)	Antena 3	Series
2000	La habitación blanca	Doorman	RTVE	Made-for-TV film
2000	Paraíso	Don Anselmo	La 1	Series. 1×03
2001	Robles, investigador	–	La 1	Series. 1×12
2002, 2005 and 2011	Hospital Central	Manuel (3×05), Abraham (10×06) and Joaquín (19×18-19×19)	Telecinco	Series
2002	San Antonio de Padua	–		Made-for-TV film
2002	Clara	–	Canal Sur, ETB2, Telemadrid, Canal 9 and TVG	Made-for-TV film
2003–2004	Un lugar en el mundo	Antón	Antena 3	Series. 1×01-1×13
2004–2005	Capital	Miguel	Telemadrid	Series
2005	Motivos personales	Guillermo del Valle	Telecinco	Series. 2×05-2×06
2005–2008, 2015	Cuéntame cómo pasó	Alfredo Jiménez Arroyo	La 1	Series. 7×07-7×09, 7×16; 8×01-8×02, 8×04, 8×07-8×11, 8×13-8×15; 9×02, 9×05, 9×08-9×10, 9×12-9×14, 9×20, 9×22; 10×03, 10×12, 10×16; 16×11
2008	Los Serrano	Uncle Eusebio	Telecinco	Series. 7×09
2011	La duquesa II	Majordomo	Telecinco	Miniseries. 1×01-1×02
2011	Los misterios de Laura	Eduardo del Bosque Nájera	La 1	Series. 2×01
2011	Gran Hotel	Anselmo	Antena 3	Series. 1×02
2011	Águila Roja	–	La 1	Series. 4×01
2012	Con el culo al aire	Clergyman	Antena 3	Series. 1×13
2012	Aída	Mr. Bouza	Telecinco	Series. 9×40
2012	La conspiración	Count Rodezno	ETB2 and La 1	Made-for-TV film
2015	Rabia	Adolfo Villanueva	Cuatro	Series. 1×01
2016	Bajo sospecha	Don Pedro	Antena 3	Series. 2×03-2×04
2016	Euskolegas	–	ETB2	Series. 2×02
2017	El Ministerio del Tiempo	Juan Ureña	La 1	Series. 3×13
2020	La línea invisible	–	Movistar Plus+	Series. 1×02
2020	Mira lo que has hecho	Señor Bodas de oro	Movistar Plus+	Series. 3×06
2020	Patria	Bishop	HBO España	Miniseries. 1×04
