= Néboa =

Tv series

- Genre: Thriller; Mystery
- Created by: Xosé Morais; Víctor Sierra; Alberto Guntín
- Directed by: Gonzalo López-Gallego; Jorge Saavedra; Manu Gómez
- Starring: Emma Suárez; Isabel Naveira
- Country of origin: Spain
- Original language: Spanish
- No. of seasons: 1
- No. of episodes: 8

Production
- Production companies: RTVE; Voz Audiovisual

Original release
- Network: La 1
- Release: 15 January – 4 March 2020

Néboa is a Spanish mystery-thriller television series starring Emma Suárez and Isabel Naveira. Created by Xosé Morais, Víctor Sierra and Alberto Guntín, produced by RTVE and Voz Audiovisual and set in Galicia, the plot concerns the investigation on a series of serial murders taking place in a small island community during the carnival. It aired on La 1 in 2020.

== Premise ==
The story is set in Néboa, a fictional island off the coast of Galicia. The corpse of a teenager appears during the first night of the entroido carnival in Néboa. The murder mimics the pattern of past killings that occurred in 1919 and 1989, both of which sparked a serial killing row with multiple deaths. Locals believe the killer is the Urco, a wolf headed man from the folk stories. Three Guardia Civil agents, Mónica Ortiz, Carmela Souto and Lieutenant Ferro try to solve the mystery and avoid another serial killing rampage.

== Cast ==
- Emma Suárez as Mónica Ortiz, a UCO agent arriving from Madrid.
- Isabel Naveira as Carmela Souto, a local Guardia Civil sergeant in Néboa who teams up with Mónica.
- César Cambeiro as Sargento Viqueira.
- Alba Galocha as Vega, Mónica's daughter.
- David Seijo as Cascudo, a surfer earning a life as drug dealer.
- Denisse Peña as Ana, a girl, first victim of the Urco.
- Nancho Novo as Lieutenant Ferro.
- Nacho Nugo as Gael, Ana's friend.
- Carmela Martíns as Comba, Ana's friend.
- Jorge Varandela as Roi, Ana's friend.
- Santi Cuquejo as Turco, Ana's friend.
- Santi Prego as Alejandro, the head of the powerful Ulloa family, kingpins of the local canning industry.
- Eva Fernández as Mara, Alejandro's wife.
- Antonio Durán, "Morris" as Antón, Ana's father, working for the Ulloa family.
- María Vázquez as Rosa, Ana's mother, childhood friend of Carmela.
- Denís Gómez as Roque, Carmela's husband and Antón's best friend.
- Xabier Deive as Gonzalo.
- Sabela Arán as Olaia, Cascudo's girlfriend.
- Gonzalo Ramos as Emilio.

== Production and release ==
The series was produced by RTVE and the Galician production company Voz Audiovisual. It was created by Xosé Morais, Víctor Sierra and Alberto Guntín. The episodes were directed by Gonzalo López-Gallego, Jorge Saavedra and Manu Gómez. It was primarily filmed from May to September 2019 in Ortegal, in the north of the province of A Coruña. Other locations included Estaca de Bares, O Barqueiro, Ortigueira and Cariño. Most cast members were Galician (a notable exception being Emma Suárez). The first episode premiered in prime time on La 1 on 15 January 2020. The weekly broadcasting run of the 8-episode series ended on 4 March 2020.

Series	Episodes	Originally released			Viewers	Share (%)	Ref.
Series	Episodes	First released	Last released	Network	Viewers	Share (%)	Ref.
1	8	15 January 2020	4 March 2020	tve	1,244,375	8.4	

This is a caption
No. in season	Title	Viewers	Original release date	Share (%)
1	"Mércores de fariñada"	1,573,000	15 January 2020	10.3
2	"Xoves de folións"	1,233,000	22 January 2020	8.2
3	"Venres de máscaras"	1,318,000	29 January 2020	8.7
4	"Sábado das meigas"	1,044,000	5 February 2020	7.0
5	"Domingo de bica"	1,133,000	12 February 2020	7.5
6	"Luns borralleiro"	1,201,000	19 February 2020	8.1
7	"Martes de Entroido"	1,237,000	26 February 2020	8.5
8	"Mércores de fariñada"	1,216,000	4 March 2020	8.5

== Awards and nominations ==
Year	Award	Category	Nominee(s)	Result	Ref.
2021	19th Mestre Mateo Awards	Best Television Series		Won	
2021	19th Mestre Mateo Awards	Best Art Direction		Nominated	
2021	19th Mestre Mateo Awards	Best Cinematography Direction		Nominated	
2021	19th Mestre Mateo Awards	Best Costume Design		Nominated	
2021	19th Mestre Mateo Awards	Best Makeup and Hairstyling		Nominated	
2021	19th Mestre Mateo Awards	Best Lead Actress	Isabel Naveira	Nominated	
