= Carmelo Gómez =

Spanish actor (born 1962)

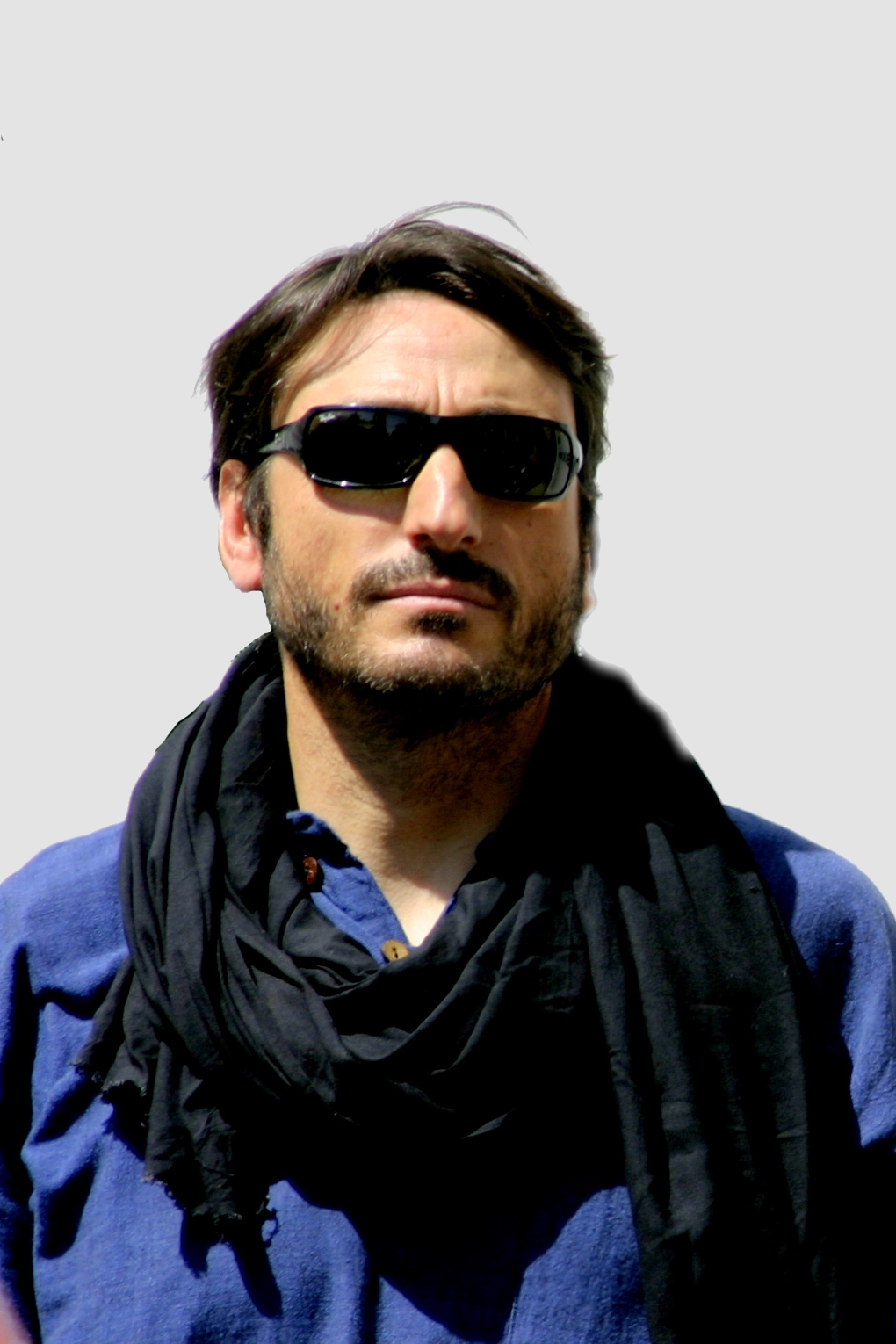
- Born: Carmelo Gómez Celada; 2 January 1962 (age 64); Sahagún, Spain
- Occupation: Actor

Carmelo Gómez Celada (born 2 January 1962) is a Spanish actor. He is the recipient of two Goya Awards, for best supporting actor in The Method and best leading actor in Running Out of Time. A very popular actor in 1990s Spanish cinema, working under the likes of Julio Medem, Pilar Miró and Imanol Uribe, he is a recurring co-star of Emma Suárez.

== Biography ==
Carmelo Gómez Celada was born on 2 January 1962 in Sahagún, province of León, and worked the land there as a farmer together with his father until moving to Salamanca, where he joined theatre groups. He graduated from the Madrid's RESAD. He made his feature film debut with a minor role in Voyage to Nowhere (1986), followed by another small role in Bajarse al moro (1988).

In 2013, at the Gijón International Film Festival, he received the Nacho Martinez award.

== Filmography ==
=== Film ===
Year	Film	Role	Notes	Ref.
1986	El viaje a ninguna parte (Voyage to Nowhere)			
1988	Bajarse al moro			
1991	Vacas	Manuel / Ignacio / Peru Irigibel		
1992	Después del sueño	Amós		
1993	La ardilla roja (The Red Squirrel)	Félix		
1994	Canción de cuna (Cradle Song)	Pablo		
1994	Días contados (Running Out of Time)	Antonio		
1994	El detective y la muerte (The Death and the Detective)	The Dark Man		
1995	Entre rojas			
1996	Tierra (Earth)	Ángel		
1996	Tu nombre envenena mis sueños (Your Name Poisons My Dreams)	Ángel Barciela		
1996	El perro del hortelano (The Dog in the Manger)	Teodoro		
1997	Territorio comanche (Comanche Territory)	José		
1997	Secretos del corazón (Secrets of the Heart)	Tío		
1998	Mararía	Fermín		
1999	Entre las piernas (Between Your Legs)	Félix		
1999	Extraños (Strangers)	Goyo Lamarca		
2000	El portero (The Goalkeeper)	Ramiro Forteza		
2000	La gran vida (Living It Up)	Martín		
2002	El viaje de Carol (Carol's Journey)	Adrián		
2002	Nos miran (They're Watching Us)	Juan		
2002	La playa de los galgos	Martín		
2003	Grimm	Diego		
2004	Hay motivo			
2006	La noche de los girasoles (The Night of the Sunflowers)	Esteban		
2007	Oviedo Express	Benjamín Olmo		
2012	Silencio en la nieve (Frozen Silence)	Sargento Espinosa		
2015	Tiempo sin aire (Breathless Time)	Iván		
2022	Llegaron de noche (What Lucia Saw)	Padre Tojeira		

=== Television ===
- La regenta as Fermín de Pas (Fernando Méndez Leite, 1995).

=== Stage ===
- La cena (2004–2005).
- Elling (2012).

== Bibliography ==
- Caparrós Lera, José María (2005). La Pantalla Popular. El cine español durante el Gobierno de la derecha (1996-2003). Tres Cantos: Ediciones Akal. ISBN 978-84-460-2414-9.
- Davies, Ann (2009). "Criminality and the left in Spanish retro noir films". Journal of Iberian and Latin American Studies. 15 (1). Routledge: 15–28. doi:10.1080/14701840903160085. S2CID 161930513.
- Durán Manso, Valeriano (2019). "Nostalgia y melodrama en el cine de José Luis Garci (1982-1996)". Área Abierta. Madrid: Ediciones Complutense. doi:10.5209/ARAB.60729. hdl:11441/105247. ISSN 2530-7592. S2CID 239586522.
- Fernández Soto, Concepción; Checa y Olmos, Francisco (2010). "El cine de Pilar Miró. Homenaje y puente hacia la literatura" [Pilar Miró's Films. A Tribute and Link to Literature]. Arbor. CLXXXVI (741). Madrid: Consejo Superior de Investigaciones Científicas: 79–88. doi:10.3989/arbor.2010.741n1008. ISSN 0210-1963.
- Heller-Nicholas, Alexandra (2021). Rape-Revenge Films: A Critical Study (2nd ed.). Jefferson, NC: McFarland & Company, Inc., Publishers. ISBN 978-1-4766-8649-3.
- Jordan, Barry; Morgan-Tamosunas, Rikki (1998). Contemporary Spanish Cinema. Manchester and New York: Manchester University Press. ISBN 9780719044137.
- Juan-Navarro, Santiago (2018). "Tierra (Earth) (1996)". In Jimenez Murguía, Salvador; Pinar, Alex (eds.). The Encyclopedia of Contemporary Spanish Films. Rowman & Littlefield. p. 370–371. ISBN 9781442271333.
- Nogueira Otero, Xosé (2018). "Oviedo Express, de Gonzalo Suárez: el género degenerado (una vez más)". Quintana (17). Santiago de Compostela: Universidade de Santiago de Compostela. doi:10.15304/qui.17.5181. S2CID 182719246.
- Perriam, Chris (2003). Stars and Masculinities in Spanish Cinema: From Banderas to Bardem. Oxford University Press. p. 98–99. ISBN 0-19-815996-X.
- Stone, Rob (2007). Spanish and Latin American Filmmakers: Julio Medem. Manchester and New York: Manchester University Press. p. 214. ISBN 978-0-7190-7200-0.
- Whittaker, Tom (2013). "La noche de los girasoles/Night of the Sunflowers (Jorge Sánchez-Cabezudo, 2006): palimpsests of genre, palimpsests of violence". In Delgado, Maria M.; Fiddian, Robbin (eds.). Spanish cinema 1973-2010. Auteurism, politics, landscape and memory. Manchester University Press. pp. 158–159. ISBN 978-0-7190-9658-7.
