= Alberto Iglesias =

Spanish composer (born 1955)

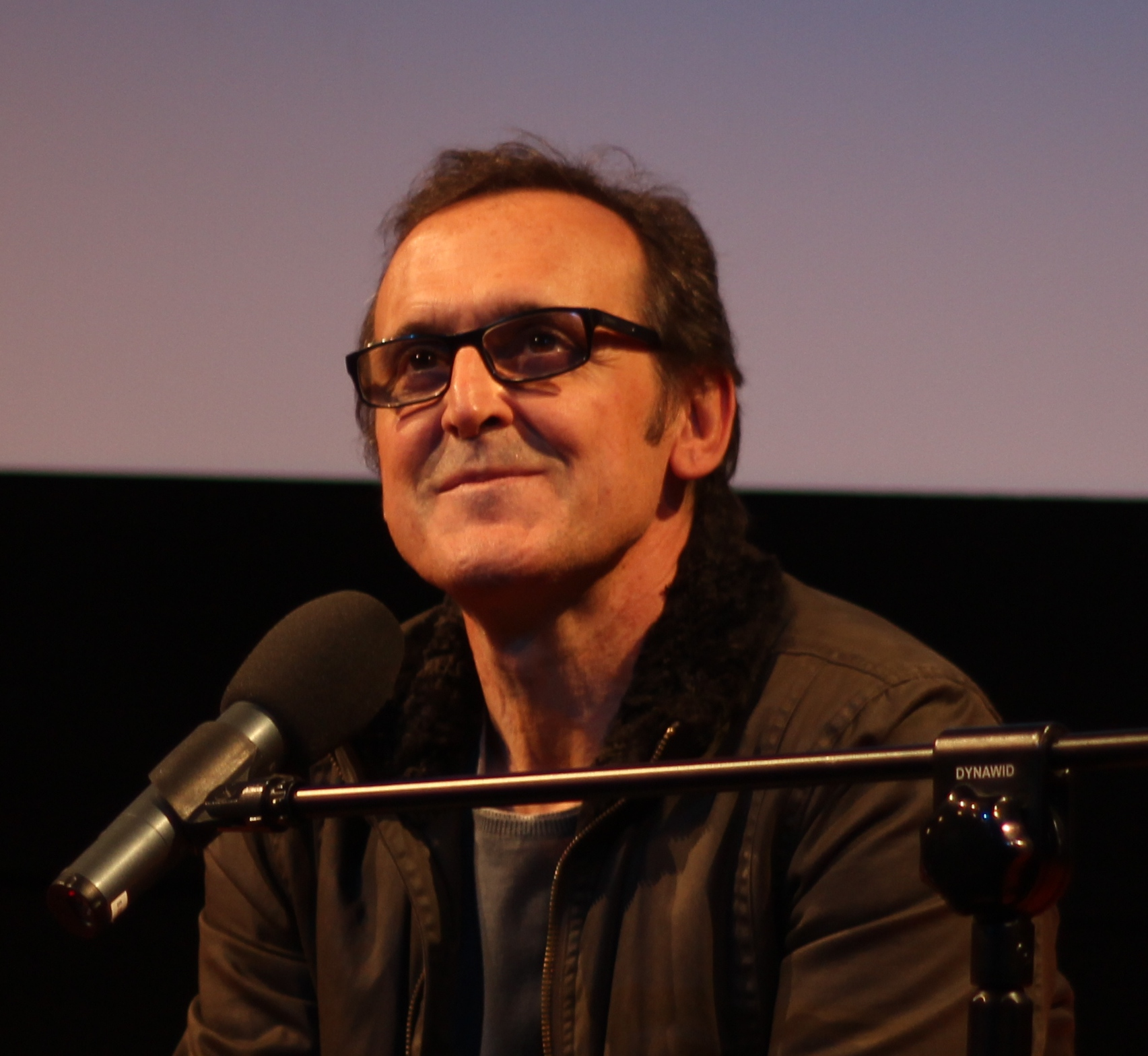
- Iglesias at Film Music Festival in Kraków, 2013

Background information
- Born: Alberto Iglesias Fernández-Berridi; 21 October 1955 (age 71); San Sebastián, Basque Country, Spain
- Genres: Film score, contemporary classical music
- Occupation: Composer
- Years active: 1983–present

Alberto Iglesias Fernández-Berridi (born 21 October 1955) is a Spanish composer. He was first noticed as a score composer for Spanish films, mostly from Pedro Almodóvar and Julio Medem. His career became more international with time and he eventually started to work also in Hollywood. Since then, he has been nominated four times for an Academy Award for his work in the films The Constant Gardener (2005), The Kite Runner (2007), Tinker Tailor Soldier Spy (2011), and Parallel Mothers (2021). His other film credits include soundtracks for Steven Soderbergh's Che. and Hossein Amini's The Two Faces of January (2014). Iglesias also has worked for ballet and has done other classical music.

== Early and personal life ==
Alberto Iglesias Fernández-Berridi was born in 1955 in San Sebastián, Spain. His sister is visual artist Cristina Iglesias. Iglesias was the brother-in-law of the Spanish sculptor, Juan Muñoz.

== Career ==
Iglesias studied harmony and counterpoint at the Conservatory of his home city, with Francisco Escudero, continuing his education in Paris, where he studied composition and piano, and at Phonos studios, in Barcelona, where he learned electronic music. Afterwards, he created a duo of electronic music with Javier Navarrete, who worked and performed together from 1981 to 1986. Iglesias began working in film composition in the 1980s. He has composed a number of scores for films directed by Pedro Almodóvar, such as The Flower of My Secret (1995), Live Flesh (1997), All About My Mother (1999), Talk to Her (2002), Bad Education (2004), Volver (2006), Broken Embraces (2009) and The Skin I Live In (2011).

Iglesias also composed the music for Sex and Lucia (2001), directed by Julio Medem and for Oliver Stone's documentary, Comandante (2003).

Iglesias garnered his first Oscar nomination for his score in Fernando Meirelles's film adaptation of The Constant Gardener (2005). Iglesias also composed the score for The Kite Runner (2007), based on Khaled Hosseini's 2003 novel of the same name. Iglesias earned his second Oscar nomination for that score.

In 2008, Iglesias composed Steven Soderbergh's 2008 two-part biopic, Che (2008), starring Benicio del Toro as Che Guevara.

That same year, Iglesias composed the music for Tomas Alfredson's film adaptation of Tinker Tailor Soldier Spy, starring Gary Oldman as George Smiley. Iglesias told the Los Angeles Times: "(Alfredson) explained to me very well what this film is about. It's a film about loyalties and human relationships. Their spies are victims of this moment. That was the most important thing he told me. The film and the music show the more human side." He received his third Oscar nomination for the latter film.

== Work ==
=== Film ===
Year	Title	Director	Notes
1983	La conquista de Albania	Alfonso Ungría	
1983	La muerte de Mikel	Imanol Uribe	
1987	Adiós pequeña	Imanol Uribe	
1992	Cows (Vacas)	Julio Medem	
1993	Outrage! (¡Dispara!)	Carlos Saura	
1993	The Red Squirrel	Julio Medem	
1995	Una casa en las afueras	Pedro Costa	
1995	The Flower of My Secret	Pedro Almodóvar	
1997	Live Flesh	Pedro Almodóvar	
1997	The Chambermaid on the Titanic	Bigas Luna	
1998	Lovers of the Arctic Circle	Julio Medem	
1999	All About My Mother	Pedro Almodóvar	
2001	Sex and Lucia	Julio Medem	
2002	Talk to Her	Pedro Almodóvar	
2002	The Dancer Upstairs	John Malkovich	
2004	Bad Education	Pedro Almodóvar	
2005	The Constant Gardener	Fernando Meirelles	
2006	Volver	Pedro Almodóvar	
2007	The Kite Runner	Marc Forster	
2008	Che	Steven Soderbergh	
2009	Broken Embraces	Pedro Almodóvar	
2010	Even the Rain	Icíar Bollaín	
2011	The Skin I Live In	Pedro Almodóvar	
2011	Tinker Tailor Soldier Spy	Tomas Alfredson	
2012	I'm So Excited	Pedro Almodóvar	
2014	The Two Faces of January	Hossein Amini	
2014	Exodus: Gods and Kings	Ridley Scott	
2015	Ma Ma	Julio Medem	
2016	Julieta	Pedro Almodóvar	
2017	The Summit	Santiago Mitre	
2018	Quién te cantará	Carlos Vermut	
2018	Yuli: The Carlos Acosta Story	Icíar Bollaín	
2019	Pain and Glory	Pedro Almodóvar	
2020	The Human Voice	Pedro Almodóvar	Short film
2021	Parallel Mothers	Pedro Almodóvar	
2021	Maixabel	Icíar Bollaín	
2021	O Night Divine	Luca Guadagnino	Short film
2024	The Room Next Door	Pedro Almodóvar	
2026	Bitter Christmas	Pedro Almodóvar	

=== Ballet ===
Iglesias composed the musical score for four ballets produced by Spanish choreographer Nacho Duato and the Spanish National Dance Company.

- 1992 – Cautiva
- 1994 – Tabulae
- 1995 – Cero sobre Cero
- 1997 – Self

== Awards and nominations ==
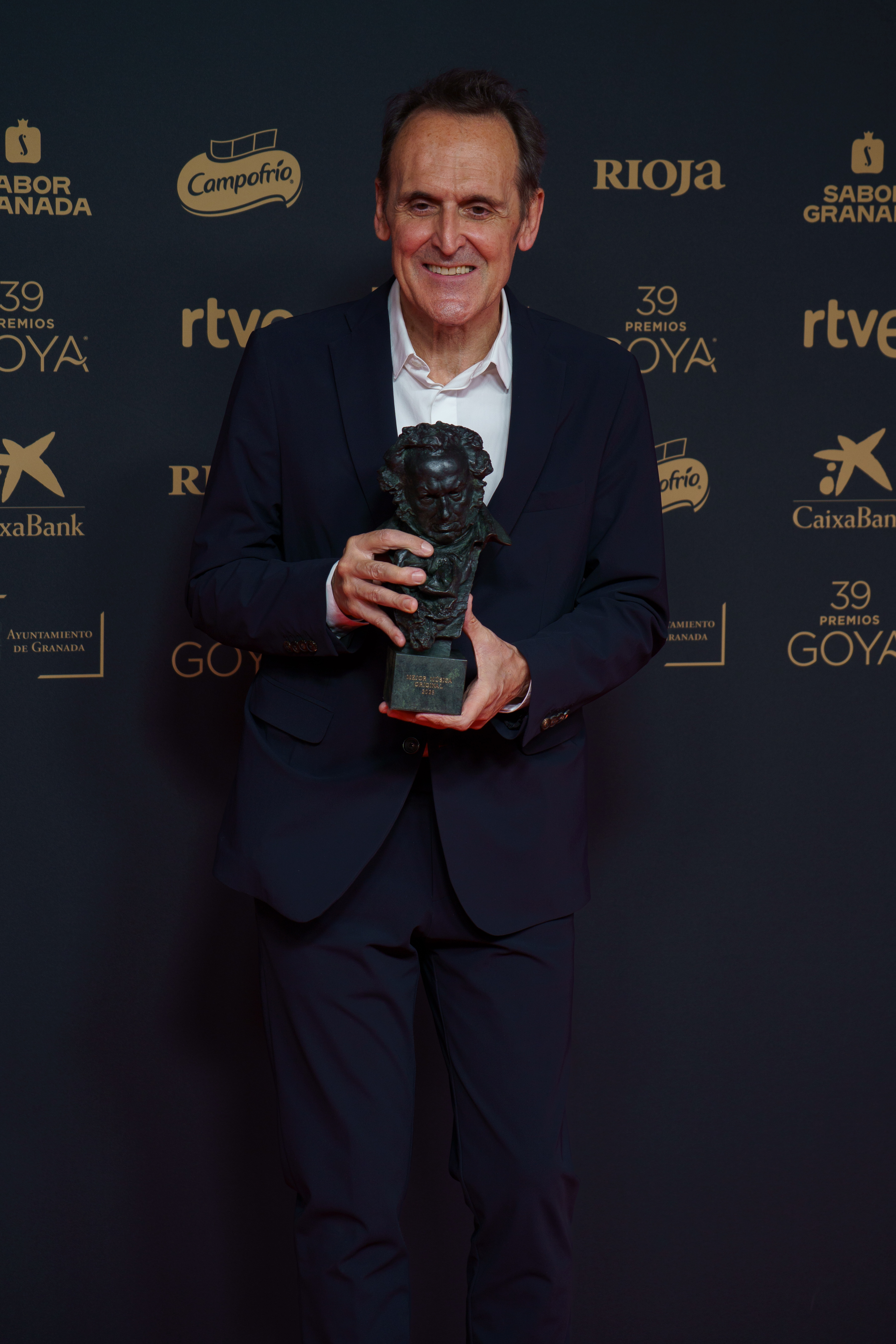
Iglesias in 2025 holding his Goya Award for his work in The Room Next Door

Year	Award	Category	Project	Result	Ref.
2005	Academy Award	Best Original Score	The Constant Gardener	Nominated	
2007	Academy Award	Best Original Score	The Kite Runner	Nominated	
2011	Academy Award	Best Original Score	Tinker Tailor Soldier Spy	Nominated	
2021	Academy Award	Best Original Score	Parallel Mothers	Nominated	
2007	Golden Globe Awards	Best Original Score	The Kite Runner	Nominated	
2022	Golden Globe Awards	Best Original Score	Parallel Mothers	Nominated	
2005	British Academy Film Awards	Best Original Music	The Constant Gardener	Nominated	
2007	British Academy Film Awards	Best Original Music	The Kite Runner	Nominated	
2011	British Academy Film Awards	Best Original Music	Tinker Tailor Soldier Spy	Nominated	
2004	European Film Awards	Best Composer	Bad Education & Take My Eyes	Nominated	
2006	European Film Awards	Best Composer	Volver	Won	
2011	European Film Awards	Best Composer	The Skin I Live In	Nominated	
1992	Goya Awards	Best Original Score	Vacas	Nominated	
1993	Goya Awards	Best Original Score	La ardilla roja	Won	
1996	Goya Awards	Best Original Score	Tierra	Won	
1998	Goya Awards	Best Original Score	Los amantes del círculo polar	Won	
1999	Goya Awards	Best Original Score	Todo sobre mi madre	Won	
2001	Goya Awards	Best Original Score	Lucia y el sexo	Won	
2002	Goya Awards	Best Original Score	Hable con ella	Won	
2006	Goya Awards	Best Original Score	Volver	Won	
2008	Goya Awards	Best Original Score	Che	Nominated	
2009	Goya Awards	Best Original Score	Broken Embraces	Won	
2010	Goya Awards	Best Original Score	Even the Rain	Won	
2011	Goya Awards	Best Original Score	The Skin I Live In	Won	
2015	Goya Awards	Best Original Score	Ma Ma	Nominated	
2016	Goya Awards	Best Original Score	Julieta	Nominated	
2017	Goya Awards	Best Original Score	The Summit	Nominated	
2018	Goya Awards	Best Original Score	Yuli	Nominated	
2019	Goya Awards	Best Original Score	Pain and Glory	Won	
2021	Goya Awards	Best Original Score	Maixabel	Nominated	
2019	Cannes Film Festival	Best Soundtrack	Pain and Glory	Won	
2011	Hollywood Film Festival	Soundtrack Composer of the Year	Tinker Tailor Soldier Spy / The Skin I Live In	Won	
2019	Platino Awards	Best Original Score	Yuli	Won	
2004	World Soundtrack Awards	Soundtrack Composer of the Year	Bad Education	Nominated	
2005	World Soundtrack Awards	Soundtrack Composer of the Year	The Constant Gardener	Won	
2012	World Soundtrack Awards	Soundtrack Composer of the Year	Tinker Tailor Soldier Spy / The Skin I Live In	Won	

== See also ==
- List of Spanish Academy Award winners and nominees
