= Your Name Poisons My Dreams =

- Theatrical release poster
- Spanish: Tu nombre envenena mis sueños
- Directed by: Pilar Miró
- Screenplay by: Ricardo Franco; Pilar Miró
- Based on: Tu nombre envenena mis sueños by Joaquín Leguina
- Produced by: Rafael Díaz-Salgado; José Luis Olaizola; Fernando de Garcillán
- Starring: Carmelo Gómez; Emma Suárez; Ángel de Andrés; Anabel Alonso; Toni Cantó
- Cinematography: Javier Aguirresarobe
- Edited by: María Elena Sáinz de Rozas
- Music by: José Nieto
- Production company: Sogetel - Central de Producciones Audiovisuales
- Distributed by: United International Pictures
- Release dates: September 1996 (San Sebastián); 27 September 1996 (Spain)
- Country: Spain
- Language: Spanish

Your Name Poisons My Dreams (Spanish: Tu nombre envenena mis sueños) is a 1996 Spanish thriller film directed and co-written by Pilar Miró consisting of an adaptation of the novel Tu nombre envenena mis sueños by Joaquín Leguina. It stars Carmelo Gómez and Emma Suárez alongside Ángel de Andrés, Anabel Alonso and Toni Cantó.

== Plot ==
The fiction, starting in 1942, is primarily set in post-Civil War, Francoist Madrid (1940s), focusing on the case pertaining the killings of some Falangists, conveyed from the point of view of inspector Ángel Barciela, the policeman taking over the investigation; there are however another two timelines corresponding to the 1950s, and to the actual war period.

== Cast ==
- Emma Suárez as Julia Buendía, a femme fatale hellbent on murdering fascists out of a desire for vengeance.
- Carmelo Gómez as Ángel Barciela, the policeman taking on the investigation of the killings.
- Ángel de Andrés as Paco Valduque.
- Anabel Alonso as Lola.
- Toni Cantó as Jaime Méndez, a former member of the Socialist Youth and former Julia's lover, killed by Fascists.
- Héctor Colomé as Mario Montilla
- Aitor Merino
- Simón Andreu
- Montserrat Carulla

== Production ==
A film adaptation of Joaquín Leguina's novel Tu nombre envenena mis sueños, the screenplay was penned by Ricardo Franco and Pilar Miró. The film was produced by Sogetel/Central de Producciones Audiovisuales and it had the participation of Sogepaq and Canal Plus. Javier Aguirresarobe was responsible for cinematography, José Nieto for the music, and María Elena Sáinz de Rozas for film editing. Rafael Díaz-Salgado, José Luis Olaizola and Fernando de Garcillán were credited as producers.

== Release ==
The film was presented at the 44th San Sebastián International Film Festival in September 1996, the same year as The Dog in the Manger, another film directed by Miró, who would die about a year later. Distributed by UIP, it opened in Spanish theatres on 27 September 1996.

== Reception ==
David Rooney of Variety deemed the film to be a "mediocre period detective thriller", "more sleep-inducing than intoxicating".

Augusto Martínez Torres of El País considered that the story would have probably been more interesting if it had focused on developing the (richer) personality of the woman, rather than on the point of view of the man.

== See also ==
- List of Spanish films of 1996

== Bibliography ==
- Angulo, Jesús (1998). "El cine de Pilar Miró" (PDF). Nosferatu. Revista de Cine (28): 17–32 – via Universitat Politècnica de València.
- Davies, Ann (2009). "Criminality and the left in Spanish retro noir films". Journal of Iberian and Latin American Studies. 15 (1): 15–28. doi:10.1080/14701840903160085. S2CID 161930513.
- Davies, Ann (2010). "The Femme Fatale of Spanish Retro Noir: The Recuperation of a Repressed Voice". In Hanson, Helen; O'Rawe, Catherine (eds.). The Femme Fatale: Images, Histories, Contexts. Palgrave Macmillan. pp. 145–156. ISBN 978-0-230-20361-7.
- Peña Rodríguez, Francisco José (2022). Martínez Deyros, María; Broullón Lozano, Manuel; Calvo Revilla, Ana; Morán Rodríguez, Carmen (eds.). Estética de la recursividad en la literatura y el cine contemporáneos. Madrid: Editorial Dykinson. pp. 157–168. ISBN 978-84-1377-955-3.
- Perriam, Chris (2003). Stars and Masculinities in Spanish Cinema: From Banderas to Bardem. Oxford University Press. ISBN 0-19-815996-X.
