= Bienvenidos al Lolita =

- Genre: Comedy drama
- Directed by: Fernando González Molina; David Molina; Sandra Gallego
- Starring: Beatriz Carvajal; Roberto Álamo; Natalia Verbeke; Carlos Santos; Nerea Camacho; Luis Varela
- Country of origin: Spain
- Original language: Spanish
- No. of seasons: 1
- No. of episodes: 8

Production
- Executive producers: Daniel Écija; Álex Pina; Fernando González Molina; Esther Martínez Lobato
- Production company: Globomedia

Original release
- Network: Antena 3
- Release: 7 January – 25 February 2014

Bienvenidos al Lolita is a Spanish dramedy television series set in a cabaret club. Produced by Globomedia for Antena 3, it aired on the latter channel from January 2014 to February 2014.

== Premise ==
The series is about the backstage mishaps of a troupe of people (a "dysfunctional family") working at a time of economic crisis at the Lolita Cabaret club located in Madrid.

== Cast ==
- Beatriz Carvajal as Dolores Reina.
- Luis Varela as Don José Luis Carrión.
- Natalia Verbeke as Violeta Reina.
- Roberto Álamo as Cúper.
- Carlos Santos as Alfredo.
- Sara Vega as Roxy.
- Rodrigo Guirao as Jota.
- Nerea Camacho as Greta.
- Jorge Bosch as Reverendo.
- Cristina Peña as Norma del Pino.
- Maggie Civantos interpreta a Fanny.
- Nuria Herrero as Lupe.
- Estefanía de los Santos as Charo.
- Font García as Virgilio.
- Denisse Peña as Daniela.
- Álvaro Balas as Xuxo.
- Lucía Balas as Nuri.
- Pablo Espinosa as Camilo.

== Production and release ==
Bienvenidos al Lolita, tentatively titled Lolita Cabaret before its release, was inspired in the classical Spanish comedy genre from the 1950s and 1960s. The series was produced by Globomedia, whereas Daniel Écija, Álex Pina, Fernando González Molina and Esther Martínez Lobato were credited as executive producers. Fernando González Molina, David Molina and Sandra Gallego directed the episodes. The 6-month-long filming was wrapped up by November 2013. Shooting took place in Madrid.

The series premiered on 7 January 2014, with a "promising" 18.4% share. However interest rapidly waned, and the audience share went all the way down to a 10.5% in the sixth episode. Antena 3 then decided not to renovate the series, with the last 2 episodes yet to be aired. The broadcasting run of the 8-episode season ended on 25 February 2014, averaging 2,658,000 viewers and a 14.0% share.

The misfiring of the series reportedly made Pina "realize the need to regenerate the prevailing model of national television". According to Pina, the series' direst mistake was "not being coherent with the plot", "making a cabaret series" (...) "without being absolutely transgressive is a mistake".

Series	Episodes	Originally released			Viewers	Share (%)	Ref.
Series	Episodes	First released	Last released	Network	Viewers	Share (%)	Ref.
1	8	7 January 2014	25 February 2014	Antena 3	2,658,000	14.0	

This is a caption
No. in season	Title	Viewers	Original release date	Share (%)
1	"Bienvenidos al Lolita"	3,551,000	7 January 2014	18.4
2	"Abuela de día, cabaretera de noche"	3,361,000	14 January 2014	17.5
3	"Lo verde empieza en Los Pirineos"	2,898,000	21 January 2014	15.6
4	"El hermano rarito de Garritas"	2,719,000	28 January 2014	14.7
5	"El teorema del beso con lengua"	2,597,000	4 February 2014	12.6
6	"La pandilla basura"	1,989,000	11 February 2014	10.5
7	"En el alambre"	2,079,000	18 February 2014	11.5
8	"El último viaje a Egipto"	2,070,000	25 February 2014	11.5
