= Memoirs of Leticia Valle =

- Film poster
- Spanish: Memorias de Leticia Valle
- Directed by: Miguel Angel Rivas
- Screenplay by: Maribel Alonso; Alberto Porlanco; Miguel Angel Rivas
- Based on: Memorias de Leticia Valle by Rosa Chacel
- Starring: Ramiro Oliveros; Jeannine Mestre; Fernando Rey; Emma Suárez; Héctor Alterio; Queta Claver; Francisco Casares; Esperanza Roy
- Cinematography: Carlos Suárez
- Edited by: Eduardo Biurrun
- Music by: Alberto Bourbón
- Distributed by: Arte 7
- Release dates: 10 September 1979 (Zinemaldia); 25 February 1980 (Spain)
- Country: Spain
- Language: Spanish

Memoirs of Leticia Valle (Spanish: Memorias de Leticia Valle) is a 1979 Spanish coming-of-age drama film directed by Miguel Ángel Rivas based on the novel of the same name by Rosa Chacel. Emma Suárez stars as the title character.

== Plot ==
Set in 1912, the plot follows the mishaps of a 14-year-old girl from Simancas, Old Castile, entering an affective triangle with her two educators Doña Luisa and Don Daniel. She ends up moving with her uncle and aunt to Switzerland after the suicide of one of her educators.

== Cast ==
- Ramiro Oliveros as Don Daniel
- Jeannine Mestre as Doña Luisa
- Fernando Rey as Fernando Valle
- Emma Suárez as Leticia
- Héctor Alterio
- Irina Kuberskaya
- Queta Claver
- Francisco Casares
- Esperanza Roy as Aurelia

== Production ==
The film boasted a 22 million ₧ budget. Shooting locations included Valladolid, Simancas, Segovia, and Cuenca.

== Release ==
The film received a pre-screening in Valladolid ahead of its San Sebastián International Film Festival debut in September 1979. Distributed by Arte 7, it was released theatrically in Spain on 25 February 1980.

== See also ==
- List of Spanish films of 1980
