= 70 Big Ones =

- Poster
- Spanish: 70 binladens
- Directed by: Koldo Serra
- Written by: Javier Echániz; Juan Gil; Asier Guerricaechebarria
- Produced by: Nahikari Ipiña; Koldo Serra; Carolina Bang; Álex de la Iglesia; Elia Urquiza
- Starring: Emma Suárez; Nathalie Poza; Hugo Silva
- Cinematography: Unax Mendia
- Edited by: Josu Martínez
- Production companies: Sayaka Producciones; Pokeepsie Films; La Panda
- Distributed by: Filmax
- Release dates: 12 October 2018 (Sitges); 8 March 2019 (Spain)
- Country: Spain
- Language: Spanish

70 Big Ones (Spanish: 70 binladens) is a 2018 Spanish bank heist thriller film directed by Koldo Serra which stars Emma Suárez, Nathalie Poza and Hugo Silva.

== Plot ==
Set in March 2015 in Bilbao, the plot concerns a bank heist, involving two robbers (the violent Lola and the heroin-addict Jonan) and Raquel, a woman who was at the bank branch desperately asking for a €35,000 credit (70 binladens; that is, 70 €500 notes) to see her daughter again when the former two break in.

== Cast ==
- Emma Suárez as Raquel
- Nathalie Poza as Lola
- Hugo Silva as Jonan
- Bárbara Goenaga
- Susana Abaitua
- Daniel Pérez Prada
- Fernando Albizu

== Production ==
The screenplay was penned by Javier Félix Echániz, Asier Guerricaechevarría and Juan Antonio Gil Bengoa. 70 Big Ones is a Sayaka Producciones, Pokeepsie Films and La Panda production, with participation of RTVE, ETB and Movistar+ and support from ICAA.

== Release ==
The film screened at the 51st Sitges Film Festival on 12 October 2018. Distributed by Filmax, it was theatrically released in Spain on 8 March 2019.

== Reception ==
Reviewing for Cinemanía, Yago García scored 3 out of 5 stars, deeming Emma Suárez and Nathalie Poza to be the best assets of the film, otherwise dragged by "screeching" plot twists, flashbacks trying to fill in the gaps, explanations coming too early or too late and, "above everything", its ending.

Alberto Bermejo of El Mundo's magazine Metrópoli, rated the film with 2 out of 5 stars, praising Emma Suárez "in her most disturbing role"; the "also unrecognisable" Nathalie Poza, and Hugo Silva, while citing as a negative point "the frustrated ambition to go beyond the thriller".

== See also ==
- List of Spanish films of 2019
