= Against the Wind (1990 film) =

- Theatrical release poster
- Spanish: Contra el viento
- Directed by: Paco Periñán
- Screenplay by: Paco Periñán
- Starring: Antonio Banderas; Emma Suárez; Bruce McGuire; Rosario Flores; Germán Cobos
- Cinematography: Gérard de Battista
- Music by: Ramón Farrán
- Production company: Creativos Asociados de Radio y Televisión
- Release dates: 24 September 1990 (Zinemaldia); 12 October 1990 (Spain)
- Country: Spain
- Language: Spanish

Against the Wind (Spanish: Contra el viento) is a 1990 Spanish incest-themed drama film written and directed by Paco Periñán which stars Antonio Banderas and Emma Suárez.

== Plot ==
The plot tracks the resumption of the sibling incest held between Juan and his sister Ana, once Juan, living in a small village in Andalusia, faces Ana's arrival to town, thus putting aside his budding relationship with Rosario, a local woman.

== Cast ==
- Antonio Banderas as Juan
- Emma Suárez as Ana
- Rosario Flores as Rosario
- Bruce McGuire as Petersen
- Germán Cobos as Antonio
- Paco Guijar as director
- Rafael Díaz as Colorao
- Queta Claver
- Patricia Palacios as Mary

== Production ==
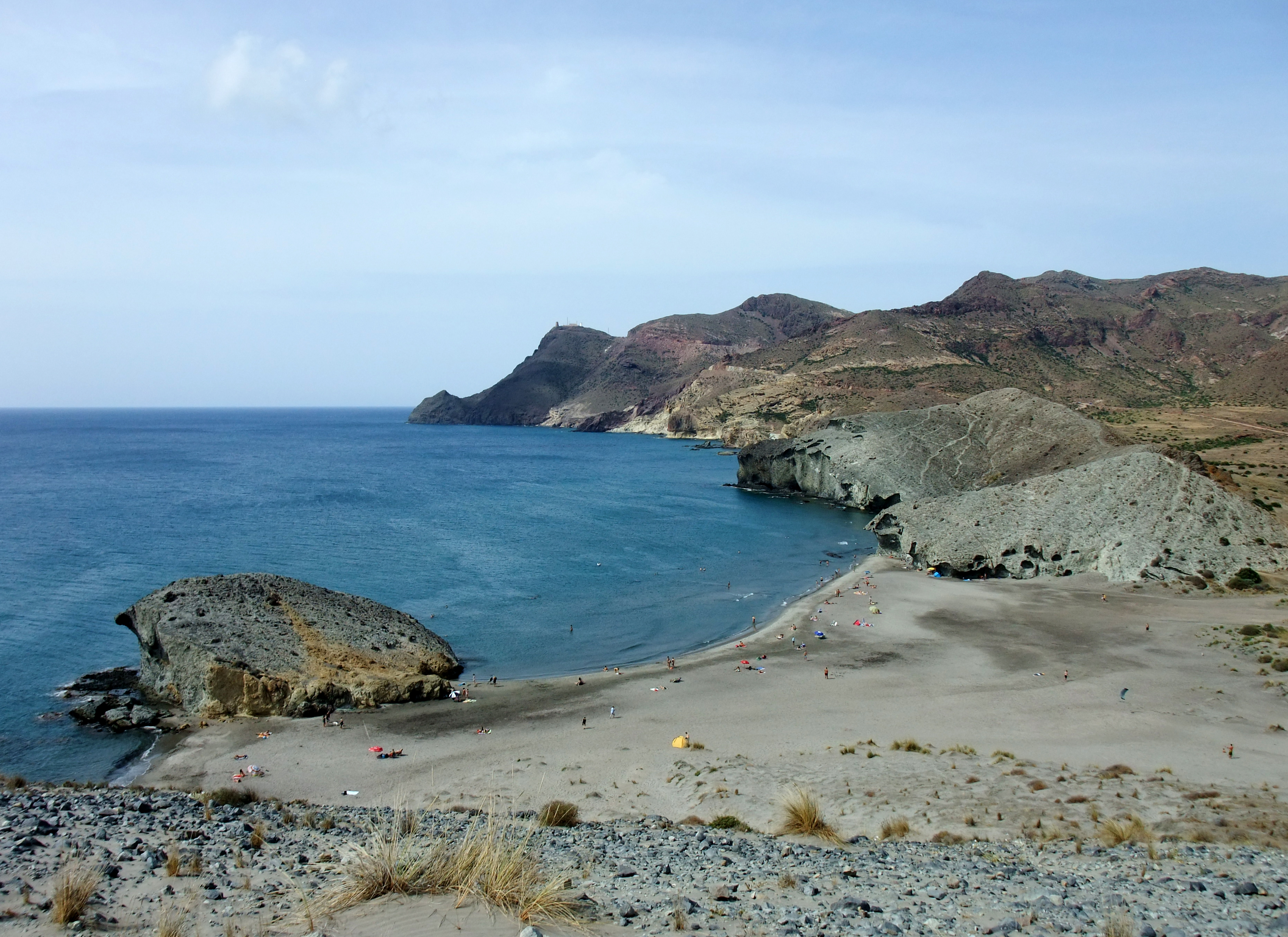
Footage was shot in Playa de Mónsul (Cabo de Gata)

The film is a Creativos Asociados de Radio y Televisión (CARTEL) production. Shooting locations included Rodalquilar, Playa de Mónsul, and Níjar.

== Release ==
Selected for the 38th San Sebastián International Film Festival's official selection, the film was presented on 24 September 1990. It was theatrically released on 12 October 1990.

== Reception ==
Ángel Fernández-Santos of El País cited the circumstance that "there is no sufficiently powerful image in the film, no situation from which it can be unequivocally deduced that when this couple [Banderas and Suárez] makes love they are violating the ancestral taboo of consanguinity" as a negative point, also pointing out that the writing resents from some loose threads that the director is not able to fully rectify later in the transfer to a visual language.

== Accolades ==
Year	Award	Category	Nominee(s)	Result	Ref.
1991	5th Goya Awards	Best New Director	Paco Periñán	Nominated	
1991	5th Goya Awards	Best Supporting Actress	Rosario Flores	Nominated	

== See also ==
- List of Spanish films of 1990
