= The Constant Gardener (soundtrack) =

Soundtrack album by Alberto Iglesias
- Released: 2005
- Recorded: 2005
- Genre: Soundtrack
- Label: Higher Octave Music

Alberto Iglesias chronology
| Bad Education (2004) | The Constant Gardener (2005) | Volver (2006) |

The Constant Gardener is the original soundtrack of the 2005 Academy Award- and Golden Globe- winning film The Constant Gardener starring Ralph Fiennes and Rachel Weisz (who won the Academy Award for Best Supporting Actress for her role as "Tessa Quayle" in this film). The original score and songs were composed and produced by Alberto Iglesias.

The album was nominated for the Academy Award for Best Original Score (lost to the score of Brokeback Mountain) and the BAFTA Award for Best Film Music (lost to the soundtrack of Memoirs of a Geisha).

== Track listing ==
1. Tessa's Death – 2:15
2. Roadblock I – 2:40
3. To Germany – 3:23
4. Tessa In The Bath – 4:12
5. Jomo Gets An HIV Test – 1:00
6. Dicholo – 3:14
7. We'll Both Be Dead By Christmas – 2:37
8. Motorbike – 1:07
9. To Airport – 2:34
10. Funeral – 2:22
11. Three Bees Testing – 3:10
12. Sandy Goes To The Hospital – 1:36
13. Kothbiro – 5:34
14. Justin Returns To The House – 3:17
15. Raid – 5:21
16. Destruction – 2:00
17. To Loki – 1:15
18. Kindergarten – 3:36
19. Hospital – 3:00
20. Kenny Curtis – 3:00
21. Landing In Sudan – 1:58
22. Justin's Breakdown – 3:46
23. Justin's Death – 3:24
24. Dropped Off At Turkana – 2:30
25. Roadblock II – 3:30
26. Procession – 1:40
- Total Time: 74:01
