= What You Never Knew =

- Theatrical release poster
- Spanish: Aunque tú no lo sepas
- Directed by: Juan Vicente Córdoba
- Screenplay by: Juan Vicente Córdoba; Antonio Conesa; María Reyes Arias; José Manuel Benayas
- Based on: "El vocabulario de los balcones" by Almudena Grandes
- Produced by: Enrique Cerezo; Antonio Conesa; Juan Vicente Córdoba
- Starring: Silvia Munt; Gary Piquer; Andrés Gertrúdix; Cristina Brondo; Daniel Guzmán
- Cinematography: Aitor Mantxola
- Edited by: Osvaldo Donatién
- Music by: Ángel Illarramendi≤
- Production companies: Enrique Cerezo PC; Samarkanda cine & video
- Distributed by: Wanda Visión
- Release dates: September 2000 (Zinemaldia); 24 November 2000 (Spain)
- Country: Spain
- Language: Spanish

What You Never Knew (Spanish: Aunque tú no lo sepas) is a 2000 Spanish romantic drama film directed by Juan Vicente Córdoba (in his directorial debut feature) based on Almudena Grandes' short story "El vocabulario de los balcones" which stars Sílvia Munt and Gary Piquer alongside Andrés Gertrúdix, Cristina Brondo, and Daniel Guzmán.

== Plot ==
Split in two different times (1974 and 1999), and set in Madrid, the plot follows the botched love story between a well-off woman and a vulgar man from Vallecas who first met upon facing each other from balconies on opposite sides of the street.

== Cast ==
- Sílvia Munt as Lucía
- Gary Piquer as Juan
- Andrés Gertrúdix as Juan (young)
- Cristina Brondo as Lucía (young)
- Daniel Guzmán as Santi (young)
- Luisa Gavasa as Juan's mother
- Emilio Linder as Juan's father
- Txema Blasco as Benito
- Manuel Morón as Santi
- Darío Paso as Kike
- Eloy Azorín as Nacho

== Production ==
The film is an adaptation of Almudena Grandes' short story "El vocabulario de los balcones", included in Modelos de mujer. The film is an Enrique Cerezo PC and Samarkanda production and it had the participation of TVE and Vía Digital.

== Release ==
The film was selected in the Zabaltegi (New Directors) lineup of the 48th San Sebastián International Film Festival. It was released theatrically in Spain on 24 November 2000.

== Reception ==
Jonathan Holland of Variety deemed the film to be a "graceful love story that shuttles back and forth between time periods and between pleasure and frustration".

== See also ==
- List of Spanish films of 2000
