= Arian's Journey =

- Theatrical release poster
- Spanish: El viaje de Arián
- Directed by: Eduard Bosch
- Screenplay by: Jordi Gasull; Patxi Amezcua
- Produced by: Ángel Blasco
- Starring: Ingrid Rubio; Abel Folk; Silvia Munt; Txema Blasco; Carlos Manuel Díaz
- Cinematography: Xavier Gil
- Edited by: Eduard Bosch; Javier Naya
- Music by: Joan Valent
- Production company: Montjuic Entertainment
- Distributed by: Buena Vista International
- Release dates: May 2000 (Málaga); 4 May 2001 (Spain)
- Country: Spain
- Language: Spanish

Arian's Journey (Spanish: El viaje de Arián) is a 2000 Spanish thriller drama film directed by Eduard Bosch from a screenplay by Jordi Gasull and Patxi Amezcua which stars Ingrid Rubio alongside Abel Folk and Sílvia Munt.

== Plot ==
Young abertzale Arián, involved in the kale borroka, falls for older terrorist Vivaldi, joining ETA's Nafarroa commando. After things go South, Arián refuses to kill a hostage, and kills her surviving associates instead, fleeing to Barcelona.

== Cast ==
- Ingrid Rubio as Arián
- Abel Folk as Vivaldi
- Carlos Manuel Díaz as José
- Silvia Munt as Maite
- Txema Blasco as Arián's father
- Laia Marull as Isabel Ulloa
- Santi Ibáñez as Mario
- Paul Berrondo as Patxo

== Production ==
The film is a Montjuic Entertainment production. It was scored by Joan Valent and lensed by Xavier Gil.

== Release ==
The film premiered at the 3rd Málaga Film Festival in May 2000. It was released theatrically in Spain on 4 May 2001.

== Reception ==
Jonathan Holland of Variety deemed the film to be "well meaning but as fatally flawed as the characters who drive it".

Mirito Torreiro of El País highlighted a "superb" performance by Ingrid Rubio, but pointed out at flaws worth mentioning, such as the film getting lost in trying to be credible vis-à-vis the resolution of the hostage crisis.

== See also ==
- List of Spanish films of 2001
