= Do It for Me =

- Theatrical release poster
- Spanish: Hazlo por mí
- Directed by: Ángel Fernández Santos
- Screenplay by: Juan Miguel Hernández
- Produced by: Ángel Fernández Santos; Estrella de Miguel
- Starring: Cayetana Guillén Cuervo; Carlos Hipólito; Nancho Novo; Eulalia Ramón; Txema Blasco; Concha Leza; Jose Velázquez
- Cinematography: Juan Molina
- Edited by: Fernando Pardo
- Music by: Juan Carlos Cuello
- Production company: Producciones El Desierto
- Distributed by: United International Pictures
- Release dates: October 1997 (Mostra); 7 November 1997 (Spain)
- Country: Spain
- Language: Spanish

Do It for Me (Spanish: Hazlo por mí) is a 1997 Spanish thriller drama film directed by Ángel Fernández Santos and written by Juan Miguel Hernández. It stars Cayetana Guillén Cuervo, Carlos Hipólito, and Nancho Novo.

== Plot ==
Dull bourgeois man Andrés Uriarte inherits his father's family business in which he meets femme fatale Isabel Velasco (herself in a relationship with brutish immate Paco Reina), sleeping with her in a nightclub. Isabel ends up suggesting Andrés that she and a friend may kidnap Andrés' son David so Andrés' father-in-law pays for the ransom.

== Cast ==
- Cayetana Guillén Cuervo as Isabel Velasco
- Carlos Hipólito as Andrés Uriarte
- Nancho Novo as Paco Reina
- Eulalia Ramón as Nuria Robles
- Txema Blasco as Antonio Robles
- Concha Leza as Lola Robles
- José Velázquez as David
- Laura Aparicio as Luisa
- Fernando Martín as comisario Ramos
- Jorge Bosso as Miguel Castro
- María Jesús Ruz as Pilar

== Production ==
Do It for Me was produced by El Desierto, and it had the collaboration of Canal+.

== Release ==
The film screened in the competitive slate of the 18th Mostra de València in October 1997, with Guillén Cuervo winning the best female performance award. Distributed by UIP, it was released theatrically in Spain on 7 November 1997.

== Reception ==
Jonathan Holland of Variety deemed the film to be an "unpretentious, low-budget kidnap thriller" writing that, while nothing is too original, the film "is strong in not sacrificing its human elements to plot demands".

Warning that his film review was not self-criticism due to match of given name and family name with the director, Ángel Fernández-Santos (Note: The film critic and occasional screenwriter, not to be confused with the director, filmmaker Ángel Fernández Santos, unrelated to the former.) of El País wrote that the plot suffers from "a very superficial, unsustainable, and at times painful arbitrariness".

== See also ==
- List of Spanish films of 1997
