= Emergency Exit (film) =

- Theatrical release poster
- Directed by: Lluís Miñarro
- Screenplay by: Lluís Miñarro; Lu Colomina
- Produced by: Lluís Miñarro
- Starring: Marisa Paredes; Naomi Kawase; Arielle Dombasle; Myriam Mézières; Emma Suárez; Francesc Orella; Albert Pla; Gonzalo Cunill; Oriol Pla; Aida Folch; Lu Colomina; Miquel Barberá; Laia Brugarolas; Jhonattan Burjack
- Cinematography: Jimmy Gimferrer
- Edited by: Diana Toucedo
- Music by: Anahit Simonian
- Production companies: Lluís Miñarro Producciones; El Viaje Films
- Distributed by: Sideral Cinema
- Release dates: 13 November 2025 (PÖFF); 19 December 2025 (Spain)
- Running time: 96 minutes
- Country: Spain
- Languages: Catalan; Spanish; Japanese

Emergency Exit is a 2025 Spanish surrealist road movie directed by Lluís Miñarro.

== Plot ==
Fourteen people travel in a bus with unknown destination that they cannot leave. In the fiction, all the characters except Marisa Paredes' die.

== Cast ==
- Marisa Paredes as actriz / herself ('actress')
- Naomi Kawase as antropóloga ('anthropologist')
- Arielle Dombasle as Brigitte
- Myriam Mézières as Ascensión
- Emma Suárez as ginecóloga ('gynaecologist')
- Francesc Orella as manager
- Albert Pla as director de cine ('film director')
- Gonzalo Cunill as vendedor ('salesman')
- Oriol Pla as sacerdote ('priest')
- Aida Folch as ama de casa ('housewife')
- Lu Colomina as evangelista ('evangelist')
- Miquel Barberá as domador ('tamer')
- Laia Brugarolas as niña ('girl')
- Jhona Burjack as Eros

== Production ==
Lluís Miñarro co-wrote the screenplay with Lu Colomina. Emergency Exit was produced by Lluís Miñarro Producciones and El Viaje Films, and it had the collaboration of 3Cat and ICEC. Shooting locations included Tenerife, La Gomera, and Catalonia.

== Release ==
The film world premiered in the 'Rebels With a Cause' section of the 29th Tallinn Black Nights Film Festival (PÖFF). It was also programmed in the official selection of the 63rd Gijón International Film Festival. Distributed by Sideral Cinema, it was released theatrically in Spain on 19 December 2025.

== Reception ==
Mariana Hristova of Cineuropa assessed the film to be "a post-modern pastiche" lamenting that "when it isn't quite funny enough – and sadly, that's the case here in some episodes – [it] can feel somewhat dated".

Luis Martínez of El Mundo gave the film a 4-star rating, deeming it to be "unclassifiable, sensual, occasionally provocative, abstract when it wants to be", and, thanks to Marisa Paredes, "even indispensable".

Fernando Bernal of Cinemanía rated the film 4 out of 5 stars considering it a "demonstration of how to work with images through words".

== See also ==
- List of Spanish films of 2025
