= Emma Suárez =

Spanish actress

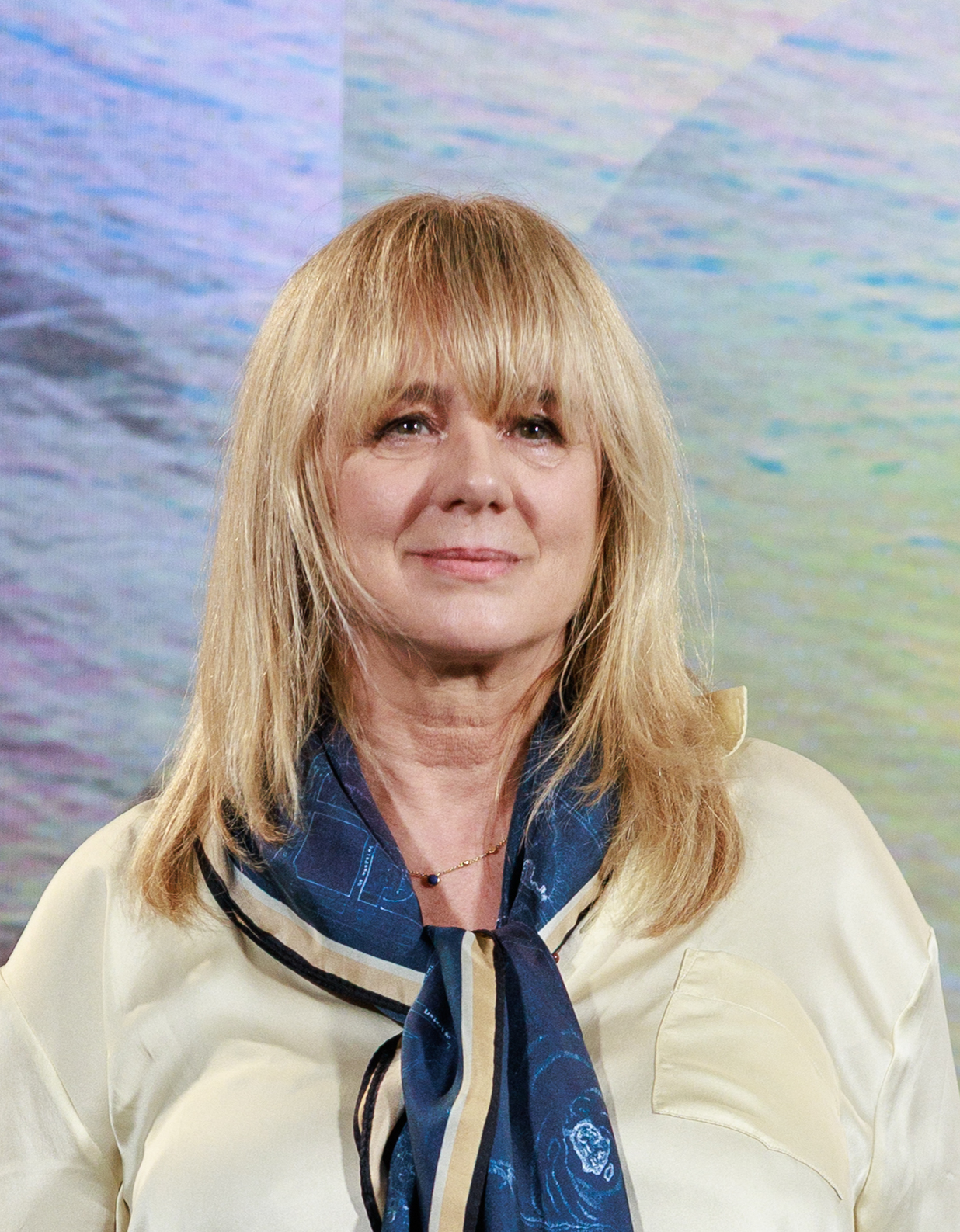
- Suárez in 2025
- Born: Emma Suárez Bodelón; 25 June 1964 (age 62); Madrid, Spain
- Occupation: Actress
- Years active: 1979–present

Emma Suárez Bodelón (born 25 June 1964) is a Spanish actress. She is the recipient of numerous accolades, including three Goya Awards.

After her debut as a child actress in Memoirs of Leticia Valle in 1979, she developed a professional acting career on screen and stage, landing her first adult film lead role in The White Dove. She acquired a great deal of recognition and prestige in 1990s Spanish cinema, starring in films such as Cows (1992), The Red Squirrel (1993), Earth (1996), and The Dog in the Manger (1996), for which she won her first Goya Award for Best Actress.

She continued her career in the 2000s and the 2010s in Hours of Light (2004), Under the Stars (2007), The Mosquito Net (2010), Julieta (2016), and The Next Skin (2016), winning a doublet of Goya Awards in 2017 for her work in the last two films. She has since appeared in films such as April's Daughter (2017), Josephine (2021), and The Rite of Spring and television series such as La zona, Néboa, and Intimacy.

== Early life and career beginnings ==
Emma Suárez Bodelón was born on 25 June 1964 in Madrid. Raised in a family with no significant connection to acting, Suárez attended her first casting at age 14 after her father saw a casting ad for the film in a newspaper and encouraged her to apply, making her debut performance in Memoirs of Leticia Valle (1979), in which she portrayed the title character.

From age 15 to 25, she gained experience on stage, performing in plays such as El cementerio de los pájaros, Bajarse al moro and La chunga. Early film roles include performances in Double Feature (1984) and Dear Nanny (1986).

Her participation in the music video for the Joaquín Sabina song "Así estoy sin ti" gained her further notoriety. She starred in Isabel Coixet's Barcelona-set directorial debut Too Old to Die Young (1989), portraying Evax. Also in the same year, she starred along with Antonio Banderas and Paco Rabal in The White Dove, and appeared in Imanol Uribe's witchcraft-themed fantaterror oddity La luna negra. While Too Old to Die Young was largely understood as a commercial failure and was bashed by many critics, Suárez collected the Sant Jordi Award for Best Spanish Actress in May 1990. In 1990, she starred opposite to Banderas in incest-themed drama Against the Wind.

== Breakthrough in Medem's trilogy and major roles (1992–1999) ==
Suárez's career experienced a breakthrough with her performances in the trilogy of Basque art films directed by early Julio Medem: Cows (1992), The Red Squirrel (1993), and Earth (1996). In Cows, she shared screentime for the first time with Carmelo Gómez, with whom she formed an iconic screen duo in Spanish cinema. In The Red Squirrel, described by Medem as a "parable against machismo", she played a young woman rendered amnesic in a motorcycle accident who is then inserted into a fictitious relationship underpinned by deception and male domination. Her performance in the film landed her first Goya Award nomination. Following the distribution of the film, she turned down an offer by Steven Spielberg to play the female lead of The Mask of Zorro. For her part in Earth, she played an "introverted and self-disciplined" woman.

In 1993, she also appeared in the European co-production The Milky Way, decried by David Stratton as a "tasteless and painfully unfunny film, a Euro-pudding with no distinguishing features". Subsequent film roles include her portrayal of flight stewardess Rita in Rosa Vergés' Barcelona-set romantic comedy Souvenir, which critic David Rooney deemed to be "something of a weak link" for the film, as "her lack of establishing scenes and shortage of screen time" deprived the film of an adequate romantic target to comic anchor Futoshi Kasagawa.

Suárez went on to star in The Dog in the Manger (1996) directed by Pilar Miró based on the 1618 play of the same name. It was required for Suárez to declaim her entire performance in verse, for which she trained with Alicia Hermida. David Rooney positively compared the fun and "rewarding chemistry" in the film between Suárez and Gómez to their screen appearances in the "dour" thriller Your Name Poisons My Dreams (1996), also directed by Miró. For her work in The Dog in the Manger portraying Diana, Countess of Belfor, Suárez won her first Goya Award for Best Leading Actress.

In 1998, she portrayed a seasoned guerrilla fighter in internationally co-produced Colombia-set comedy Time Out. In 1999, she starred as the idealistic anarchist Delfina in the big-budget Euro epic The City of Marvels, a film adaptation of the novel by Eduardo Mendoza directed by Mario Camus, and as a straight woman falling for a gay man in romantic comedy-drama I Will Survive. Originally devised by Medem to feature in Sex and Lucia, she found herself temporarily estranged from the filmmaker following several delays in the project and dropped out from it, while Najwa Nimri got in.

== Later roles ==
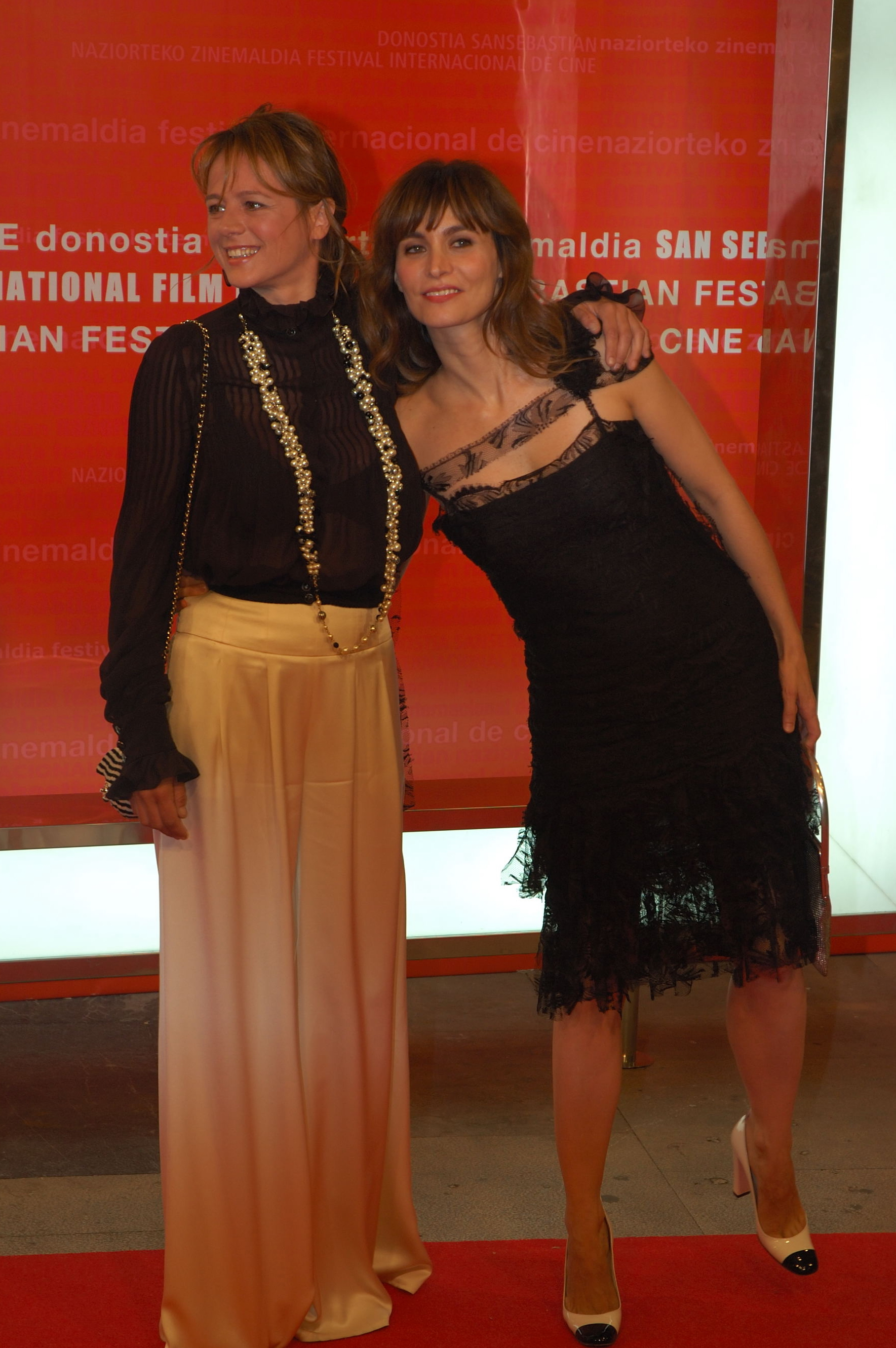
Emma Suárez (left) with fellow actress Ana Risueño at the San Sebastián International Film Festival (c. 2005).

She starred as a cabaret performer in the 2001 film Dama de Porto Pim, set in the Azores against the backdrop of World War II. For her performance as a "flighty" single mother dealing with her own demons in Under the Stars (2007), Suárez obtained another Goya Award nomination. Likewise, she starred opposite Bárbara Lennie as a bounty hunter and femme fatale in the Mexican noir film Todos los días son tuyos (2007) about the detention of alleged ETA members.

In 2010, Suárez featured in The Mosquito Net, a film about a Catalan dysfunctional family that was presented at the Seminci. In the fiction, she portrayed an illustrator corroded by pain at the verge of suicide, with Suárez describing her character back as one of the most complex and hard in her career up to that date. She obtained Goya and Gaudí Award nominations, as well as a Forqué Award for Best Actress ex aequo with Nora Navas, among other accolades.

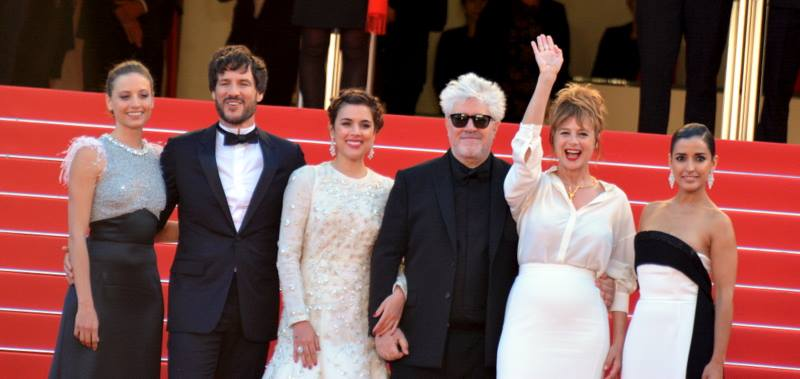
Suárez (waving right hand) attending the Cannes presentation of Julieta along with Michelle Jenner, Daniel Grao, Adriana Ugarte, Pedro Almodóvar, and Inma Cuesta in May 2016.

In Pedro Almodóvar's Julieta, Suárez played the titular role along with Adriana Ugarte. The film entered competition for the Palme d'Or at the 2016 Cannes Film Festival and won Suárez her second Goya Award for Best Leading Actress for playing a 55-year-old teacher thinking about how to explain to her missing daughter the secrets she has withheld for over thirty years. At the same ceremony, she was also awarded the Goya Award for Best Supporting Actress for her performance in Isa Campo and Isaki Lacuesta's The Next Skin.

In 2017, she starred in Michel Franco's April's Daughters, another Cannes entry, portraying a cougar. Allan Hunter of ScreenDaily assessed that Suárez made her character in the film "entirely plausible", writing that she [April] "is all the more chilling for being so matter-of-fact about her actions".

Suárez played a beleaguered woman desperate for gathering €35,000 in less than 24 hours in heist thriller 70 Big Ones (2018).

Suárez's appearance in The Influence (2019) portraying an evil and disgusting matriarch projecting pain onto her daughters marked her return to the horror genre after La luna negra. She starred as a civil servant diagnosed with cancer who rethinks her life during a trip to Greece in the Spanish-Greek co-production Window to the Sea, premiering at the 2019 San Sebastián International Film Festival.

Her television credits in the 2010s include La zona, for which she earned a Feroz Award for Best Actress in a Series. She starred as UCO agent Mónica Ortiz in the Galicia-set mystery thriller miniseries Néboa, which aired in 2020 on La 1. In December 2020, she was bestowed the Gold Medal of Merit in the Fine Arts by the Spanish Council of Ministers.

She starred alongside Roberto Álamo and Miguel Bernardeau in the drama film Josephine (2021), a magical realism tale about a mother to an inmate entering a relationship with a prison guard that landed Suárez another nomination for the Goya Award for Best Leading Actress. Likewise, her supporting role as an unprejudiced mother to a young man with cerebral palsy in search of sexual assistance in The Rite of Spring (2022) earned her a nomination for the Feroz Award for Best Supporting Actress.

In Someone Who Takes Care of Me (2023), she starred alongside Magüi Mira and Aura Garrido in the female-led generational film portraying a HIV-positive woman keeping her condition from her daughter. Also in 2023, she portrayed a misandric queen stranded on an island with her daughters and a misogynistic logger and his sons in fantasy comedy The Tenderness.

She starred again in a maternal role opposite to Natalia de Molina as a recovering alcoholic in Dismantling an Elephant (2024).

In 2025, she debuted at the Teatro de la Abadía in the play El cuarto de atrás, portraying Carmen Martín Gaite. She also played a spiteful telenovela-like character in the thriller television series The Gardener. Likewise, she starred as the wife of a shipping magnate in The Birthday Party, which she described as a film talking "about power. Corruption. The self. The family. The vulnerability, too", and appeared in the Vix original film Instintos.

== Selected filmography ==
Key
†	Denotes works that have not yet been released

=== Film ===
Year	Title	Role	Notes	Ref.
1979	Memorias de Leticia Valle (Memoirs of Leticia Valle)	Leticia Valle	Feature film debut	
1984	Sesión continua (Double Feature)			
1984	El jardín secreto			
1986	Tata mía (Dear Nanny)			
1989	Demasiado viejo para morir joven (Too Old to Die Young)	Evax		
1989	La blanca paloma (The White Dove)	Rocío		
1989	La luna negra	Lola		
1990	Contra el viento (Against the Wind)	Ana		
1990	A solas contigo (Alone Together)	hermana de Gloria		
1992	Vacas	Cristina		
1992	Orquesta Club Virginia (Club Virginia Orchestra)	María		
1993	La ardilla roja (The Red Squirrel)	Lisa		
1994	Sombras paralelas	Alteria		
1994	Souvenir	Rita		
1995	Una casa en las afueras (A House on the Outskirts)	Yolanda		
1996	Tu nombre envenena mis sueños (Your Name Poisons My Dreams)	Julia Buendía		
1996	El perro del hortelano (The Dog in the Manger)	Diana, condesa de Belflor		
1996	Tierra (Earth)	Ángela		
1998	Golpe de estadio (Time Out)	María		
1999	La ciudad de los prodigios (The City of Marvels)	Delfina		
1999	Sobreviviré (I Will Survive)	Marga		
2000	Besos para todos (Kisses for Everyone)	Vicky		
2001	Visionarios (Visionaries)	Carmen Molina		
2001	Dama de Porto Pim	Lucía		
2002	El caballero Don Quijote (Don Quixote, Knight Errant)	Duquesa		
2003	Sansa			
2004	Horas de luz (Hours of Light)	Mari Mar		
2007	Bajo las estrellas (Under the Stars)	Nines		
2007	Todos los días son tuyos	La Rubia		
2008	La casa de mi padre	Blanca		
2010	Herois (Forever Young)	Gloria		
2010	La mosquitera (The Mosquito Net)	Alicia		
2011	¿Para qué sirve un oso?	Natalia		
2012	Buscando a Eimish	Valeria		
2014	Murieron por encima de sus posibilidades (Dying Beyond Their Means)	Ana		
2015	Novatos			
2016	Julieta	Julieta Arcos		
2016	Las furias (The Furies)	Ana		
2016	La propera pell (The Next Skin)	Ana		
2016	Falling	Alma		
2017	Las hijas de Abril (April's Daughter)	Abril		
2018	70 binladens (70 Big Ones)	Raquel		
2019	Una ventana al mar (Window to the Sea)	María		
2019	La influencia (The Influence)	Victoria		
2020	Invisibles (The Invisible)	Elsa		
2021	Josefina (Josephine)	Berta		
2022	La consagración de la primavera (The Rite of Spring)	Isabel		
2023	Alguien que cuide de mí (Someone Who Takes Care of Me)	Cecilia		
2023	La ternura (The Tenderness)	Reina Esmeralda		
2024	Desmontando un elefante (Dismantling an Elephant)	Marga		
2025	The Birthday Party	Olivia		
2025	Fragmentos (Fragments)	Irene		
2025	Emergency Exit	Ginecóloga ('gynaecologist')		
2026	Hora y veinte (Hour and Twenty)			
2026	Ancestral			
2026	Hermanas † (Sisters)	Marta		
TBD	Todo arde †	Laura Trueba		

=== Television ===
Year	Title	Role	Notes	Ref.
1984	Fragmentos de interior	Luisa		
1986	Tristeza de amor	Letícia		
1989	Delirios de amor	Almudena		
1994	La mujer de tu vida	Lucia		
1997	Querido maestro	Elena		
2017	La zona	Marta Carcedo		
2019	Criminal: Spain	María de los Ángeles Toranzo Puig		
2020	Néboa	Mónica Ortiz		
2022	Intimidad (Intimacy)	Miren		
2024	Reina Roja (Red Queen)	Laura Trueba		
2025	El jardinero (The Gardener)	Sabela Costeira		
2025	Innato (Innate)	Arias		
2026	La acusación (Reasonable Doubts)			

== Accolades ==
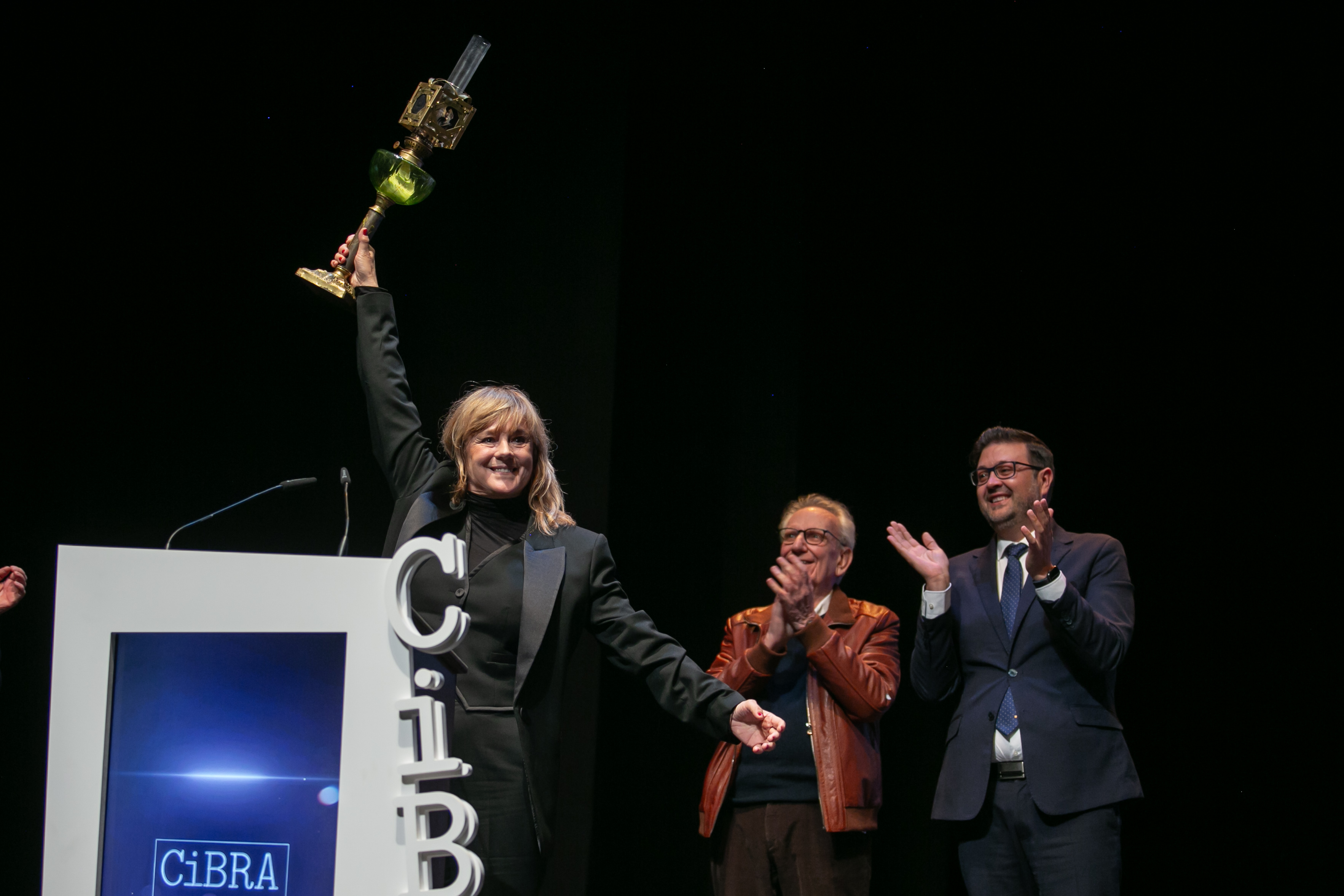
Suárez holding her Alice Guy film award at the closing gala of the 2023 CiBRA Festival.

Year	Award	Category	Work	Result	Ref.
1994	8th Goya Awards	Best Actress	The Red Squirrel	Nominated	
1994	3rd Actors Union Awards	Best Film Performance in a Leading Role	The Red Squirrel	Won	
1997	11th Goya Awards	Best Actress	The Dog in the Manger	Won	
2008	22nd Goya Awards	Best Actress	Under the Stars	Nominated	
2010	55th Valladolid International Film Festival	Best Actress	The Mosquito Net	Won	
2011	16th Forqué Awards	Best Actress	The Mosquito Net	Won	
2011	3rd Gaudí Awards	Best Actress	The Mosquito Net	Nominated	
2011	25th Goya Awards	Best Actress	The Mosquito Net	Nominated	
2016	29th European Film Awards	Best European Actress	Julieta	Nominated	
2017	22nd Forqué Awards	Best Actress	Julieta	Won	
2017	4th Feroz Awards	Best Actress	Julieta	Nominated	
2017	9th Gaudí Awards	Best Actress	The Next Skin	Won	
2017	72nd CEC Medals	Best Actress	Julieta	Won	
2017	72nd CEC Medals	Best Supporting Actress	The Next Skin	Nominated	
2017	31st Goya Awards	Best Actress	Julieta	Won	
2017	31st Goya Awards	Best Supporting Actress	The Next Skin	Won	
2017	26th Actors and Actresses Union Awards	Best Film Actress in a Leading Role	Julieta	Nominated	
2017	26th Actors and Actresses Union Awards	Best Film Actress in a Minor Role	The Furies	Nominated	
2017	4th Platino Awards	Best Actress	Julieta	Nominated	
2018	5th Feroz Awards	Best Supporting Actress in a Series	La zona	Won	
2018	5th Platino Awards	Best Actress	April's Daughter	Nominated	
2021	76th CEC Medals	Best Actress	The Invisible	Nominated	
2022	36th Goya Awards	Best Actress	Josephine	Nominated	
2023	10th Feroz Awards	Best Supporting Actress in a Film	The Rite of Spring	Nominated	
2023	31st Actors and Actresses Union Awards	Best Film Actress in a Minor Role	The Rite of Spring	Nominated	
