= Living It Up (2000 film) =

- Directed by: Antonio Cuadri
- Starring: Salma Hayek; Carmelo Gómez
- Distributed by: Columbia TriStar Films de España
- Release date: 11 October 2000
- Running time: 1h 49min
- Country: Spain
- Language: Spanish

Living It Up (Spanish: La gran vida) is a 2000 Spanish comedy film directed by Antonio Cuadri.

== Cast ==
- Salma Hayek - Lola
- Carmelo Gómez - Martin
- Tito Valverde - Salva
- Alicia Agut - Rosa
- Pilar López de Ayala
- Carlos Bardem - Matón discoteca 1
- Miguel Ayones - Montero
