= The Red Squirrel =

- Movie poster
- Spanish: La ardilla roja
- Directed by: Julio Médem
- Written by: Julio Médem
- Produced by: Fernando de Garcillán; Enrique López Lavigne
- Starring: Emma Suárez; Nancho Novo; María Barranco; Karra Elejalde; Carmelo Gómez; Ana Gracia; Mónica Molina; Cristina Marcos
- Cinematography: Gonzalo F. Berridi
- Edited by: María Elena Sáinz de Rozas
- Music by: Txetxo Bengoetxea; Alberto Iglesias
- Distributed by: Colifilms Distribution
- Release date: 21 April 1993
- Running time: 114 minutes
- Country: Spain
- Languages: Spanish; German

The Red Squirrel (Spanish: La ardilla roja) is a 1993 Spanish drama film directed by Julio Médem, starring Emma Suárez, Nancho Novo and María Barranco.

== Plot ==
Jota, a failed musician whose girlfriend has recently left him, is about to commit suicide by jumping off a bridge when a girl on a motorcycle, Sofía, crashes off it. Rushing to help her, he discovers she has lost her memory and cannot even remember her name. After telling the paramedics and staff at the hospital that she is his girlfriend, he later tells her the same. He invents an entire identity for her, giving her the name Lisa, and a history of their relationship according to his own fantasies. With the hospital psychiatrist starting to become suspicious, he spirits her out of the hospital and away on a trip to the Ardilla Roja campsite, which he claims they have been planning for some while. As their relationship becomes intimate, their behaviour sparks the suspicions of campers Antón and Carmena. It becomes clear that Lisa/Sofía's memory is not entirely missing and she is hiding her own past secrets; notably, the existence of a psychotic ex-boyfriend, Félix, who is rampaging across the country in search of her.

== Cast ==
- Emma Suárez as Lisa
- Nancho Novo as Jota
- María Barranco as Carmen
- Karra Elejalde as Antón
- Carmelo Gómez as Félix
- Elena Irureta as Begoña
- Chete Lera as Salvador
- Cristina Marcos as the blue-haired girl
- Ana Gracia as the psychiatrist
- Mónica Molina as the red-haired girl
- Txema Blasco as the neurologist

== See also ==
- Mithya
