= Earth (1996 film) =

1996 Spanish film directed by Julio Médem

- Theatrical release poster by Oscar Mariné
- Directed by: Julio Medem
- Written by: Julio Medem
- Produced by: Fernando de Garcillán
- Starring: Carmelo Gómez
- Cinematography: Javier Aguirresarobe
- Edited by: Iván Aledo
- Release date: 1996
- Running time: 125 minutes
- Country: Spain
- Language: Spanish

Earth (Spanish: Tierra) is a 1996 Spanish film directed by Julio Medem, starring Carmelo Gómez and Emma Suárez. It was entered into the 1996 Cannes Film Festival.

The story centres on a small rural town whose wine industry is being plagued by grubs in the soil. Ángel (played by Gómez), an exterminator recently released from mental hospital, arrives to deal with the pests and becomes involved with two of the local women.

== Cast ==
- Carmelo Gómez - Ángel Bengoetxeo
- Emma Suárez - Ángela
- Karra Elejalde - Patricio
- Silke - Mari
- Nancho Novo - Julio
- Txema Blasco - Tomás
- Ane Sánchez - Hija de Ángela
- Juan José Suárez - Manuel
- Ricardo Amador - Charly
- César Vea - Miñón (as Cesare Vea)
- Pepe Viyuela - Ulloa
- Alicia Agut - Cristina
- Miguel Palenzuela - Tío de Ángel
- Vicente Haro - Mayor (as Vicente Haro Marón)
- Adelfina Serrano - Concha
