= Nancho Novo =

Spanish actor

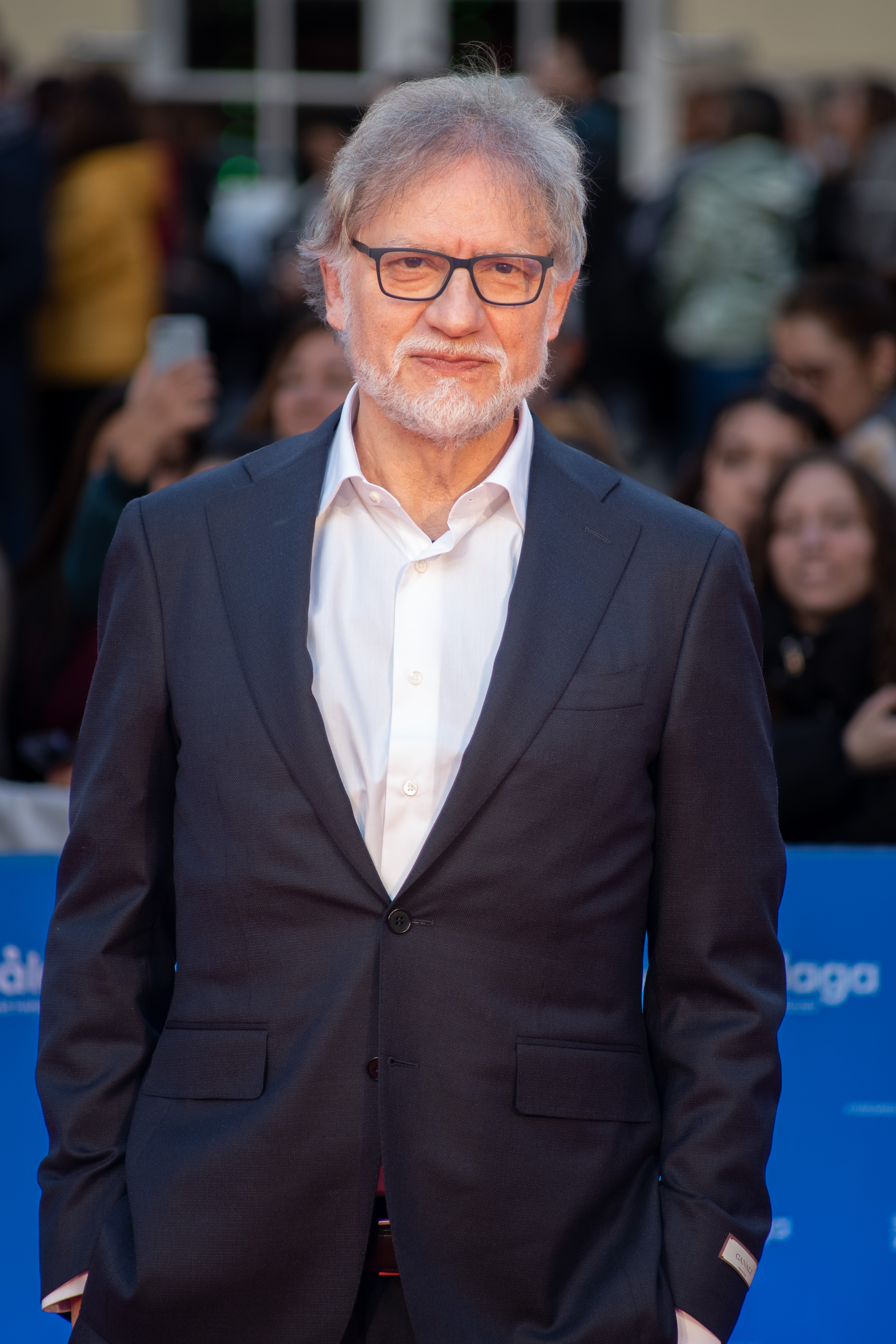
- Novo in 2024
- Born: Venancio Manuel Jesús Novo Cid-Fuentes; 17 September 1958 (age 66); A Coruña, Spain
- Occupation: Actor

Venancio Manuel Jesús Novo Cid-Fuentes (born 17 September 1958), known as Nancho Novo, is a Spanish actor.

== Life and career ==
Venancio Manuel Jesús Novo Cid-Fuentes was born in A Coruña in September 1958. He studied medicine in Santiago de Compostela but moved to Madrid to receive training as an actor at the Escuela de Arte Dramático y Danza. He also was a member of the rock band Los castigados sin postre.

== Select filmography ==
- The Red Squirrel (1993)
- All Men Are the Same (1994)
- Earth (1995)
- Dile a Laura que la quiero (1995)
- The Flower of My Secret (1995)
- Más que amor, frenesí (1996)
- La Celestina (1996)
- Hazlo por mí (1997)
- Finisterre (1998)
- Lovers of the Arctic Circle (1998)
- Tierra del Fuego (2000)
- Amor, curiosidad, prozac y dudas (2000)
- El lápiz del carpintero (2002)
- Astronautas (2003)
- Sex (2003)
- El año que trafiqué con mujeres (2005)
- Sinfín (2005)
- Somne (2005)
- Hotel Tivoli (2006)
- The Pilgrim (2014)

== Television ==
- El club de la comedia
- Raquel busca su sitio (series)
- La cocinera de Castamar (series)
- Blowing Kisses (miniseries)
- Sueños de libertad

== Accolades ==
Year	Award	Category	Work	Result	Ref.
1997	11th Goya Awards	Best Supporting Actor	La Celestina	Nominated	
2007	10th Málaga Film Festival	Best Supporting Actor	Always Yours	Won	
