= Julio Medem =

Basque-Spanish filmmaker (born 1958)

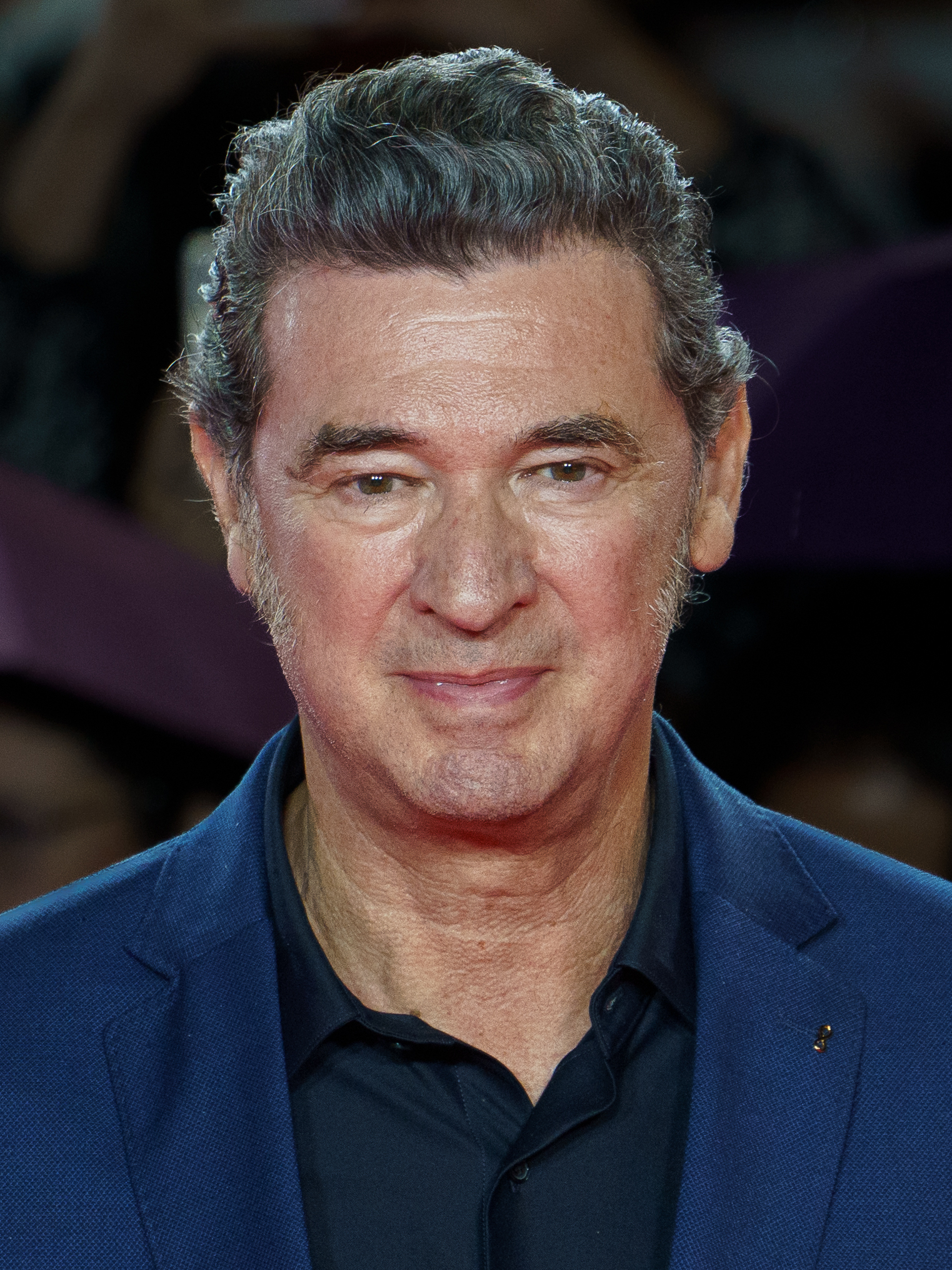
- Medem in 2025
- Born: Julio Medem Lafont; 21 October 1958 (age 67); San Sebastián, Basque Country, Spain
- Education: University of the Basque Country
- Occupations: Director, screenwriter, producer, editor
- Years active: 1974–present
- Spouses: Lola Barrera (m. 1976, divorced): Montse Sanz
- Children: 3

Julio Medem Lafont (born 21 October 1958) is a Basque film director, producer, editor, and screenwriter.

== Biography ==
Medem was born on 21 October 1958 in San Sebastián, Basque Country, Spain and showed an interest in movies since childhood, when he would take his father's Super 8 camera and shoot at night, while nobody was paying attention. After college graduation, with degrees in Medicine and General Surgery, he worked as a film critic and later as a screenwriter, assistant director and editor. After a few shorts, he directed his first full-length feature, Vacas (Cows) for which he won a Goya Award.

After this film he directed The Red Squirrel and Earth, both receiving good reviews at Cannes. His next film, Lovers of the Arctic Circle, has been compared to the works of Krzysztof Kieślowski. In 2002 was released his following film, Sex and Lucia.

Medem explored the documentary format with his next production La pelota vasca ('The Basque Ball'), a film about the political problems of the Basque Country, which caused a furor amongst some victims of terrorism and far right politicians. Following this, his film Caótica Ana debuted in 2007.

== Filmography ==
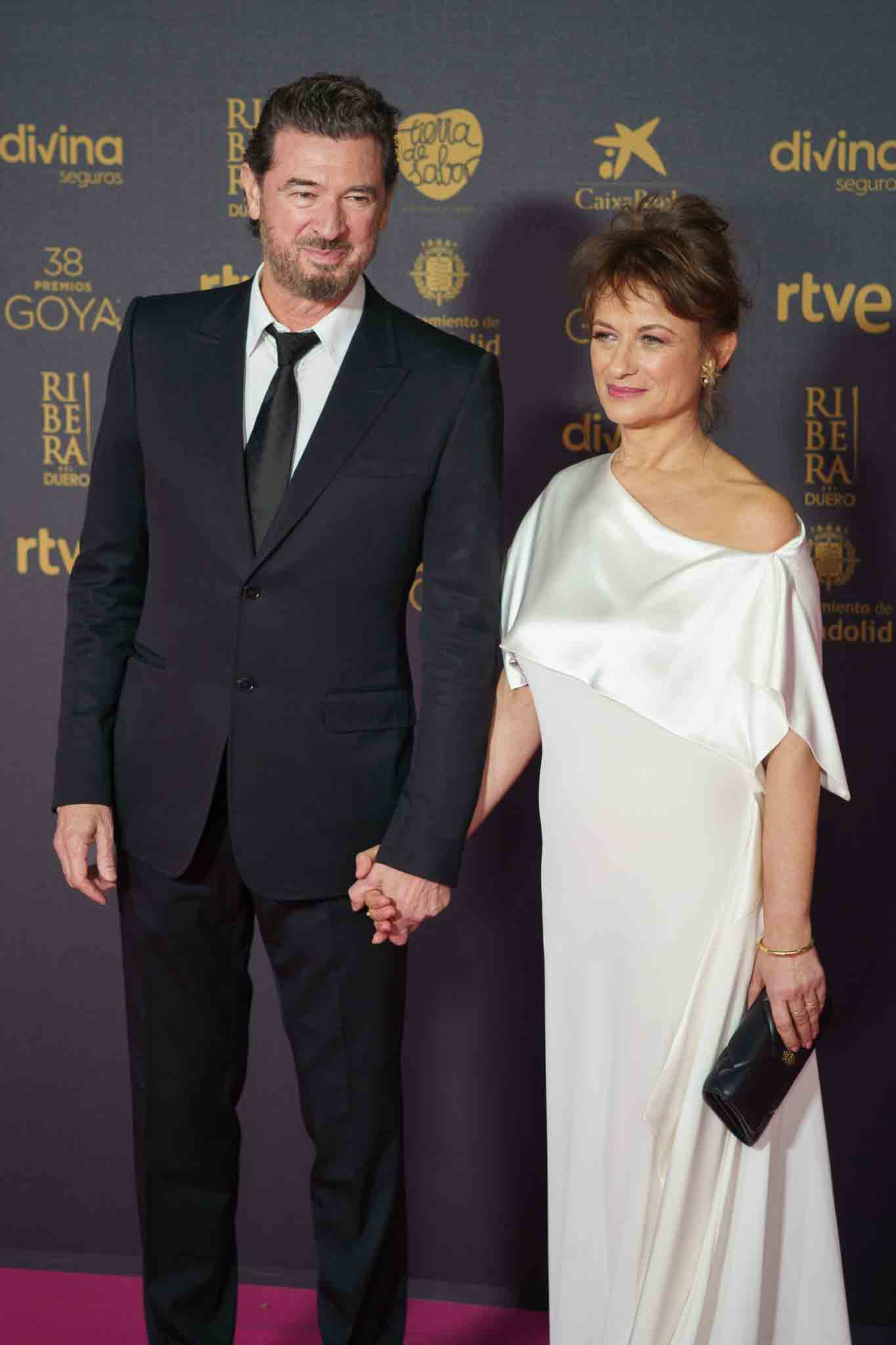
Medem with his wife Montse Sanz in 2024

=== Feature films ===
==== Narrative films ====
Year	Title	Director	Writer	Producer	Editor	Notes	Ref.
1991	Cows	Yes	Yes	No	No		
1993	The Red Squirrel	Yes	Yes	No	No		
1996	Earth	Yes	Yes	No	No		
1998	Lovers of the Arctic Circle	Yes	Yes	No	No		
2001	Sex and Lucia	Yes	Yes	No	No		
2007	Chaotic Ana	Yes	Yes	Executive	Yes		
2010	Room in Rome	Yes	Yes	Executive	Yes		
2015	Ma Ma	Yes	Yes	Yes	Yes		
2018	The Tree of Blood	Yes	Yes	Yes	No		
2025	8	Yes	Yes	Yes	Yes		
2026	Minotaur: Picasso and the Women of Guernica	Yes	Yes			In post-production	

==== Documentary films ====
Year	Title	Director	Writer	Producer	Editor
2003	The Basque Ball: Skin Against Stone	Yes	Yes	Yes	Yes
2006	Uno por ciento, esquizofrenia	No	Idea	Yes	Yes

=== Short films ===
==== Super 8 ====
- El ciego (The Blind, 1974)
- El jueves pasado (Last Thursday, 1977)
- Fideos (Noodles, 1979)
- Si yo fuera poeta... (If I Were a Poet, 1981)
- Teatro en Soria (Theatre in Soria, 1982)

==== 35 mm ====
- Patas en la cabeza (Nutty As a Fruitcake, 1985)
- Las seis en punta (Six on the Dot, 1987)
- Martín (commissioned by TVE for their Siete huellas, siete [Seven Tracks, Seven] series of short films, 1988)
- El Diario Vasco (The Basque Daily, 1989)

==== DV ====
- Asi se hizo "Airbag" (making of Juanma Bajo Ulloa's film Airbag, 1997)
- Clecla (commissioned by notodofilmfest.com, 2001)
- La pelota vasca (segment of ¡Hay motivo! [There Is Reason!], 2003)
- En las ramas de Ana (In Ana's Branches, commissioned by es:Fotogramas and Nokia for their N_ature movies series of short films, 2007)
- Concha (Mussel, video installation commissioned by Acciona and shown at Expo 2008, 2008)

==== Music video ====
- "Océano de sol" for Antonio Vega (1994)

==== Commercials ====
- Runner for Audi's Attitudes campaign (agency: El Sindicato, 1999/2000)
- Soplo/Tendedero (Waft/Clothesline) and Mediterraneo (Mediterranean) for Balay (agency: FCB Tapsa, 2002)
- Vecina (Neighbour) and Brazalete (Bracelet) for Heineken (agency: Dayax, 2003)

=== TV series ===
- Jai Alai (2023)

=== Books ===
- Aspasia Amante De Atenas (2013)
