= Álex Angulo =

Spanish actor (1953–2014)

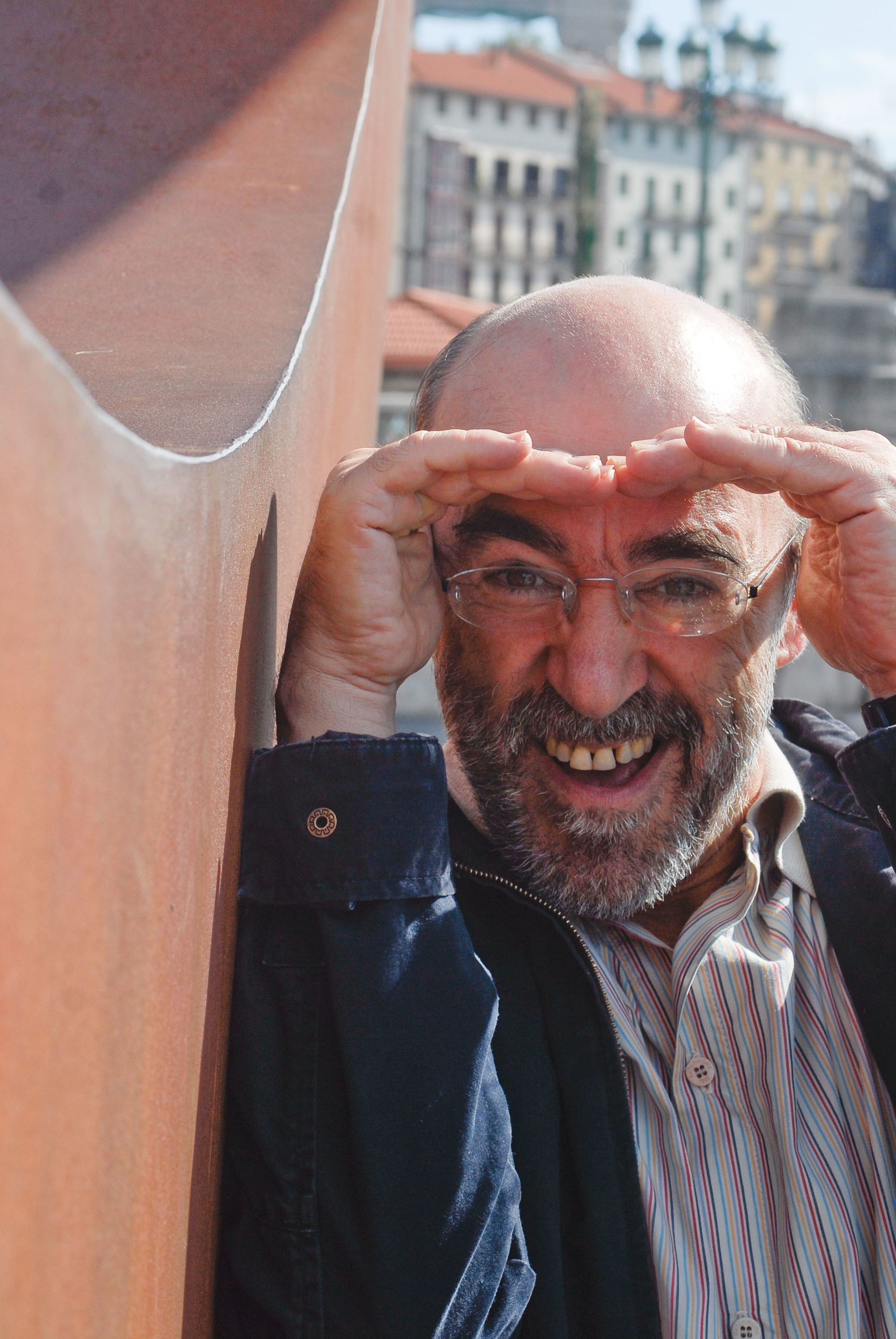
- Angulo in 2010
- Born: Alejandro Angulo León; 12 April 1953; Erandio, Spain
- Died: 20 July 2014 (aged 61); Fuenmayor, Spain
- Occupation: Actor

Alejandro Angulo León (12 April 1953 – 20 July 2014), better known as Álex Angulo, was a Spanish actor who performed in over sixty films during his career spanning more than 30 years.

== Life ==
Born in Erandio, Biscay, Angulo made his feature film debut in Imanol Uribe's Escape from Segovia (1981), portraying Anot.

Angulo died on 20 July 2014 at the age of 61 when the vehicle in which he was travelling veered from a road near Fuenmayor, La Rioja. At that moment he was going to the filming of Bendita calamidad. Then he was replaced by Luis Varela. The Spanish director Mikel Rueda dedicated his film Hidden Away to Angulo posthumously.

== Selected filmography ==
=== Films ===
- 1981: La fuga de Segovia
- 1987: El amor de ahora - (uncredited)
- 1988: Tu novia está loca - Yuste
- 1990: El anónimo... ¡vaya papelón! - Evaristo
- 1991: Anything for Bread - Genaro
- 1991: The Dumbfounded King - Hombre 1
- 1993: Acción mutante - Alex Abadie
- 1994: Los peores años de nuestra vida - Hombre en TV
- 1995: Sálvate si puedes - Empresario contaminante
- 1995: The Day of the Beast - Father Ángel Berriartúa
- 1995: Hola, ¿estás sola? - Pepe
- 1995: Así en el cielo como en la tierra - Cabrero
- 1996: Matías, juez de línea - El alcalde, Eliseo
- 1996: Brujas - Conserje
- 1996: Calor... y celos - (voice)
- 1997: Sólo se muere dos veces - Gastón
- 1997: Dos por dos - El portero
- 1997: Live Flesh - Conductor del autobús
- 1998: Grandes ocasiones - Moncho
- 1998: The Stolen Years - Máximo
- 1999: Dying of Laughter - Julián
- 2000: Compassionate Sex - Pepe
- 2002: My Mother Likes Women - Bernardo
- 2002: Todo menos la chica - Marco
- 2002: No somos nadie - El Chirlas
- 2002: Poniente - Director Colegio
- 2003: El oro de Moscú - Foto en el ordenador (uncredited)
- 2003: El coche de pedales - Don Pablo
- 2004: Isi/Disi - Amor a lo bestia - Conductor
- 2005: Otros días vendrán - Miguel
- 2006: Pan's Labyrinth - Doctor Ferreiro
- 2006: The Backwoods - José Andrés
- 2007: Casual Day - Arozamena
- 2008: La casa de mi padre - Germán
- 2009: Imago Mortis - Caligari
- 2009: Brain Drain - Cecilio
- 2010: The Great Vazquez - Peláez
- 2011: Un mundo casi perfecto - Iturrioz
- 2011: Área de descanso - Guardia Civil Mayor
- 2011: De tu ventana a la mía - Sebastián Esperanza
- 2011: Los muertos no se tocan, nene - Iñaqui Mari
- 2013: Zip & Zap and the Marble Gang - Sebastián Esperanza
- 2014: Hidden Away - Jose
- 2014: Pos eso - Manolo (voice)
- 2014: Justi&Cia - Ramón
- 2015: Refugios - Julián

=== TV series ===
- 1998-2002: Periodistas - Blas
- 2005-2006: Aquí no hay quien viva - Pedro
- 2007: Los Serrano - Julián
- 2011: 14 de abril. La República - Antonio Prado
