= Javier Aguirresarobe =

Spanish cinematographer (born 1948)

- Born: 10 October 1948 (age 78); Eibar, Guipúzcoa, Basque Country, Spain
- Education: Escuela Oficial de Cine
- Years active: 1969–present

Javier Aguirresarobe Zubía ASC (born 10 October 1948) is a Spanish cinematographer. After working primarily in Spanish movies during the 1980s and 1990s, he gained international recognition for his work on The Others (2001). From there, he worked mostly in Hollywood productions, ranging across multiple genres. He is a five-time Goya Award winner (out of 10 total nominations) and a BAFTA Award nominee, among other accolades.

== Early life and education ==
Javier Aguirresarobe Zubía was born in Eibar, Guipúzcoa, Basque Country, Spain, on 10 October 1948. He has an older brother who was an industrial photographer, whom he used to help in the lab as a teenager, and this sparked his passion for photography.

After earning a Diploma in Optics, He moved to Madrid to study journalism, and worked at various newspapers before deciding to change tack. He studied cinematography at the Official School of Cinematography, which has close links to the Spanish film industry. Only the top nine students in the entrance exam were admitted to the cinematography course. The students used 35mm film.

== Career ==
In 1983, Aguirresarobe's first work as cinematographer was for "a very small movie", La Muerte de Mikel (The Death of Mikel), which turned out to be a success at the box office.

He first attracted international attention with the 1997 film Secrets of the Heart, and even more in 2001 with The Others, directed by Alejandro Amenábar and starring Nicole Kidman.

Aguirresarobe has worked with Spanish directors such as Imanol Uribe, Alejandro Amenábar, Pedro Almodóvar, Julio Médem, Montxo Armendáriz, and Fernando Trueba, and internationally, with Miloš Forman, John Hillcoat, Woody Allen and Chris Weitz.

== Honors ==
In 2004, he won the Spanish National Photography Award.

In 2009, Aguirresarobe was one of two recipients to be awarded the Universal Basque Prize by the Lehendakari (the Basque president) "in recognition of their endeavours to disseminate the image of the Basque Country outside its frontiers in the seat of the Lehendakaritza".

In 2012, Aguirresarobe was honoured with membership of the American Society of Cinematographers on the recommendation of Steven Poster, Julio Macat, and Rodrigo Prieto.

== Filmography ==
Key
†	Denotes titles that have not yet been released

=== Feature films ===
Year	Title	Director	Notes
1978	What's a Girl Like You Doing in a Place Like This?	Fernando Colomo	
1983	Que nos quiten lo bailao	Carles Mira	
1984	La Muerte de Mikel	Imanol Uribe	
1984	El jardín secreto	Carlos Suárez	
1984	El pico 2	Eloy de la Iglesia	
1985	Eternal Fire	José Ángel Rebolledo	
1985	Golfo de Vizcaya	Javier Rebollo	
1986	27 Hours	Montxo Armendáriz	
1987	Laura, del cielo llega la noche	Gonzalo Herralde	
1987	La oveja negra	Román Chalbaud	
1987	The Enchanted Forest	José Luis Cuerda	
1991	Don Juan in Hell	Gonzalo Suárez	
1991	Prince of Shadows	Pilar Miró	
1993	The Dead Mother	Juanma Bajo Ulloa	
1993	¡Dispara!	Carlos Saura	
1993	O Fio do Horizonte	Fernando Lopes	
1994	Una chica entre un millón	Álvaro Sáenz de Heredia	
1994	Días contados	Imanol Uribe	
1995	Ainsi soient-elles	Patrick Alessandrin; Lisa Azuelos	
1995	Antarctica	Manuel Huerga	
1995	Fiesta	Pierre Boutron	
1996	Earth	Julio Medem	
1996	Your Name Poisons My Dreams	Pilar Miró	
1996	Bwana	Imanol Uribe	
1996	The Dog in the Manger	Pilar Miró	
1997	Secrets of the Heart	Montxo Armendáriz	
1997	99.9	Agustí Villaronga	
1998	The Girl of Your Dreams	Fernando Trueba	
1998	The Miracle of P. Tinto	Javier Fesser	
1999	La fuente amarilla	Miguel Santesmases	
2000	Salsa	Joyce Buñuel	
2000	Masterpiece	David Trueba	
2001	The Others	Alejandro Amenábar	
2002	Desire	Gerardo Vera	
2002	Soldiers of Salamina	David Trueba	
2002	Talk to Her	Pedro Almodóvar	
2003	Mauvais esprit	Patrick Alessandrin	
2004	The Bridge of San Luis Rey	Mary McGuckian	
2004	The Sea Inside	Alejandro Amenábar	
2005	Ants in the Mouth	Mariano Barroso	
2005	Obaba	Montxo Armendáriz	
2006	Goya's Ghosts	Miloš Forman	
2007	La carta esférica	Imanol Uribe	
2008	Tear This Heart Out	Roberto Sneider	
2008	The City of Your Final Destination	James Ivory	
2008	Vicky Cristina Barcelona	Woody Allen	
2009	The Road	John Hillcoat	
2009	The Twilight Saga: New Moon	Chris Weitz	
2010	The Twilight Saga: Eclipse	David Slade	
2011	A Better Life	Chris Weitz	
2011	Fright Night	Craig Gillespie	
2012	The Five-Year Engagement	Nicholas Stoller	
2013	Blue Jasmine	Woody Allen	
2013	Identity Thief	Seth Gordon	
2013	Warm Bodies	Jonathan Levine	
2014	The Perfect Dictatorship	Luis Estrada	
2015	Poltergeist	Gil Kenan	
2015	Goosebumps	Rob Letterman	
2016	The Finest Hours	Craig Gillespie	
2016	The Promise	Terry George	
2016	The Healer	Paco Arango	
2017	Thor: Ragnarok	Taika Waititi	
2018	The Etruscan Smile	Oded Binnun; Mihal Brezis	
2018	Here and Now	Fabien Constant	
2018	Operation Finale	Chris Weitz	
2019	Dora and the Lost City of Gold	James Bobin	
2022	Lyle, Lyle, Crocodile	Will Speck; Josh Gordon	
2022	Across the River and into the Trees	Paula Ortiz	
2024	Afraid	Chris Weitz	
2027	Day Drinker †	Marc Webb	Post-production

=== Short films ===
Year	Title	Director	Notes
1969	El espíritu	Juan Tamariz	With José Luis Sanz Benito
1973	Escena	José Ángel Rebolledo	
1974	Lola, Paz y yo	Miguel Ángel Díez	
1974	La danza de lo gracioso: Barregarearen dantza	Montxo Armendáriz	
1975	En un París imaginario	Fernando Colomo	
1976	Pomporrutas imperiales	Fernando Colomo	
1976	Ir por lana	Miguel Ángel Díez	
1976	Una pareja como las demás	Miguel Ángel Díez	
1978	Irrintzi	Mirentxu Loxarte	
1979	Ikuska-3	Antton Merikaetxeberria	
1980	Ikusmena	Montxo Armendáriz	
1980	Paisaje	Montxo Armendáriz	
1983	Guipuzkoa Donostia: Costa guipuzcoana	Imanol Uribe	
1994	Aquel ritmillo	Javier Fesser	
1996	Agurra	Iñaki Elizalde	
1997	Haika mutil	Imanol Uribe	
1999	Lorca	Iñaki Elizalde	
2000	El chico en la puerta	Alberto Palma	
2018	Tócate	Eduardo Chapero-Jackson	

=== Documentary works ===
Year	Title	Director	Notes
1985	The Basque Whalers of Labrador	Thomas Cadieux	
1989	Donde termina el corazón	Carlos Scola	
1992	Dream of Light	Víctor Erice	With Ángel Luis Fernández and José Luis López-Linares
1993	Marathon	Carlos Saura	
2003	Eric Clapton and Friends	Jana Bokova	

Documentary shorts

Year	Title	Director	Notes
1977	Ez	Imanol Uribe	
1979	Ikuska 2	Pedro Olea	
1980	Ikuska 4	Xabier Elorriaga	
1980	Ikuska 8	Koldo Larrañaga	
1981	Ikuska 11	Montxo Armendáriz	
1983	La huella árabe en España	Jaime de Armiñán	With Teo Escamilla
1983	Ikuska 13. Euskal kanta berria. La nueva canción vasca	Imanol Uribe	
1985	Bihotzez	Pedro Olea	
1988	Ngira: Gorilas en la montaña	Carlos Scola	

=== Television ===
Year	Title	Director	Notes
1989	Sabbath	Imanol Uribe	Episode "La luna negra"
1990	La forja de un rebelde	Mario Camus	2 episodes
1997	Autor por autor	Pilar Miró	

== Awards and nominations ==
Year	Award	Category	Title	Result
1987	Goya Awards	Best Cinematography	El bosque animado	Nominated
1991	Goya Awards	Best Cinematography	Don Juan in Hell	Nominated
1991	Goya Awards	Best Cinematography	Prince of Shadows	Won
1994	Goya Awards	Best Cinematography	Días contados	Nominated
1996	Goya Awards	Best Cinematography	The Dog in the Manger	Won
1998	Goya Awards	Best Cinematography	The Girl of Your Dreams	Nominated
2001	Goya Awards	Best Cinematography	The Others	Won
2002	Goya Awards	Best Cinematography	Soldiers of Salamina	Won
2004	Goya Awards	Best Cinematography	The Sea Inside	Won
2005	Goya Awards	Best Cinematography	Obaba	Nominated
1997	Sitges Film Festival	Best Cinematography	99.9	Won
2009	BAFTA Awards	Best Cinematography	The Road	Nominated
2009	San Diego Film Critics Society	Best Cinematography	The Road	Won
2009	Houston Film Critics Society	Best Cinematography	The Road	Nominated
