= The Pedal-Push Car =

- Film poster
- Spanish: El coche de pedales
- Directed by: Ramón Barea
- Screenplay by: Ramón Barea; Felipe Loza
- Produced by: José María Lara; Piluca Baquero; Pedro Pastor; José Mazeda
- Starring: Álex Angulo; Rosana Pastor; Pablo Gómez; María Pastor; Mikel Losada; Cesáreo Estébanez; Ione Irazabal; Juli Cantó; Isabel Ruth; Sergi Calleja; Loli Astoreka
- Cinematography: Paco Belda
- Edited by: Julia Juániz
- Music by: João Gil
- Distributed by: Golem Distribución
- Release dates: 8 November 2003 (Huelva); 16 January 2004 (Spain)
- Countries: Spain; Portugal
- Languages: Spanish; Esperanto

The Pedal-Push Car (Spanish: El coche de pedales) is a 2003 drama film directed by Ramón Barea starring Álex Angulo, Rosana Pastor, and Pablo Gómez. It is a Spanish-Portuguese co-production.

== Plot ==
Set in the 1959 Holy Week in Francoist Spain, the plot follows nine-year-old Pablito, who grows a fondness for a pedal-push car that his parents cannot afford. He comes to interact with and develop a deeper understanding of his family in the mother side (wealthy Francoists), and his family on his father side (vanquished Republicans).

== Cast ==
- Álex Angulo as Don Pablo
- Rosana Pastor as Estrella
- Pablo Gómez as Pablito
- María Pastor as Estrellita
- Mikel Losada as Ángel
- Cesáreo Estébanez
- Juli Cantó as Roberto
- Isabel Ruth
- Loli Astoreka
- Ione Irazabal

== Production ==
Ramón Barea wrote the screenplay along with Felipe Loza. The film is a Spanish-Portuguese co-production by Trafico de Ideas, Malvarrosa Media, Alokatu, and Take 2000, with a crew primarily consisting of Basque and Valencian professionals. It features Esperanto-language dialogue. It was fully shot in the centre of Valencia and its surroundings.

== Release ==
The film opened the Huelva Ibero-American Film Festival in November 2003. Distributed by Golem Distribución, it was released theatrically in Spain on 16 January 2004.

== Reception ==
Jonathan Holland of Variety declared the film "an utterly convincing, gently comic sketch of an era refracted through the candid gaze of its child protagonist".

== See also ==
- List of Spanish films of 2004
