= Escape from Segovia =

- Spanish: La fuga de Segovia
- Directed by: Imanol Uribe
- Screenplay by: Ángel Amigo; Imanol Uribe
- Based on: Operación Poncho by Ángel Amigo
- Produced by: Ángel Amigo
- Starring: Xabier Elorriaga; Mario Pardo; Ovidi Montllor; José María Muñoz; José Pedro Carrión; José M. Cervino; Virginia Mataix; Ramón Balenziaga; Imanol Gaztelumendi; Klara Badiola; Elene Lizarralde; Jesús Mari Lasa
- Cinematography: Javier Aguirresarobe (as Xabier Aguirresarobe)
- Edited by: Julio Peña
- Music by: Xabier Lasa; Amaia Zubiria
- Release dates: September 1981 (Zinemaldia); 6 November 1981 (Spain)
- Country: Spain
- Language: Spanish

Escape from Segovia (Spanish: La fuga de Segovia) is a 1981 Spanish prison-break film directed by Imanol Uribe from a screenplay by Ángel Amigo and Uribe consisting of a dramatized account of the 1976 Segovia prison break. The cast is led by Xabier Elorriaga, Mario Pardo, and Ovidi Montllor.

== Plot ==
The plot explores the jailbreak of about 30 prisoners, the majority of them ETA members, from the Segovia prison in April 1976.

== Cast ==
- Xabier Elorriaga
- Mario Pardo
- Ovidi Montllor
- José María Muñoz
- José Pedro Carrión
- José Manuel Cervino
- Virginia Mataix
- Ramón Balenziaga
- Imanol Gaztelumendi
- Klara Badiola
- Elene Lizarralde
- Jesús María Lasa
- Patxi Bisquert
- Santiago Ramos
- Alex Angulo
- Ramón Barea
- Guillermo Montesinos
- Txema Blasco
- Iñaki Aierra

== Production ==
Uribe decided to make the film upon inspiration from the book Operación Poncho by Ángel Amigo. Shooting locations included the old school of Los Escolapios in Tolosa, as well as various locations in Orendain, Urnieta, Segovia, Madrid, Zumarraga, and Legazpi.

== Release ==
The film premiered at the San Sebastián International Film Festival in September 1981. It was released theatrically in Spain on 6 November 1981.

== Reception ==
Janet Maslin of The New York Times considered that the film "unfolds in a careful considered style, avoiding sensationalism and concentrating on the fine points of the prisoners' complicated plan".

== See also ==
- List of Spanish films of 1981
