= Eternal Fire (film) =

1985 film

- Directed by: José Ángel Rebolledo
- Written by: José Ángel Rebolledo
- Produced by: Imanol Uribe
- Starring: Ángela Molina
- Cinematography: Javier Aguirresarobe
- Release date: 13 May 1985
- Running time: 95 minutes
- Country: Spain
- Language: Spanish

Eternal Fire (Spanish: Fuego eterno) is a 1985 Spanish drama film written and directed by José Ángel Rebolledo. It was entered into the 14th Moscow International Film Festival.

== Cast ==
- Ángela Molina as Gabrielle
- Imanol Arias as Pierre
- François-Eric Gendron as Henry Robillot
- Ovidi Montllor as Estebanot
- Klara Badiola
- Ramón Barea as Bertrand
- Manuel de Blas as Padre Robillot
- Myriam De Maeztu as Jeanne Garat (as Myriam Maeztu)
- Juana Ginzo as Superiora convento
- Elena Irureta
- Amaia Lasa as Sor Sainte Therese
- Margarita Lascoiti as Madre Robillot
