= Jorge de Juan =

Spanish film and theater actor, producer, and director

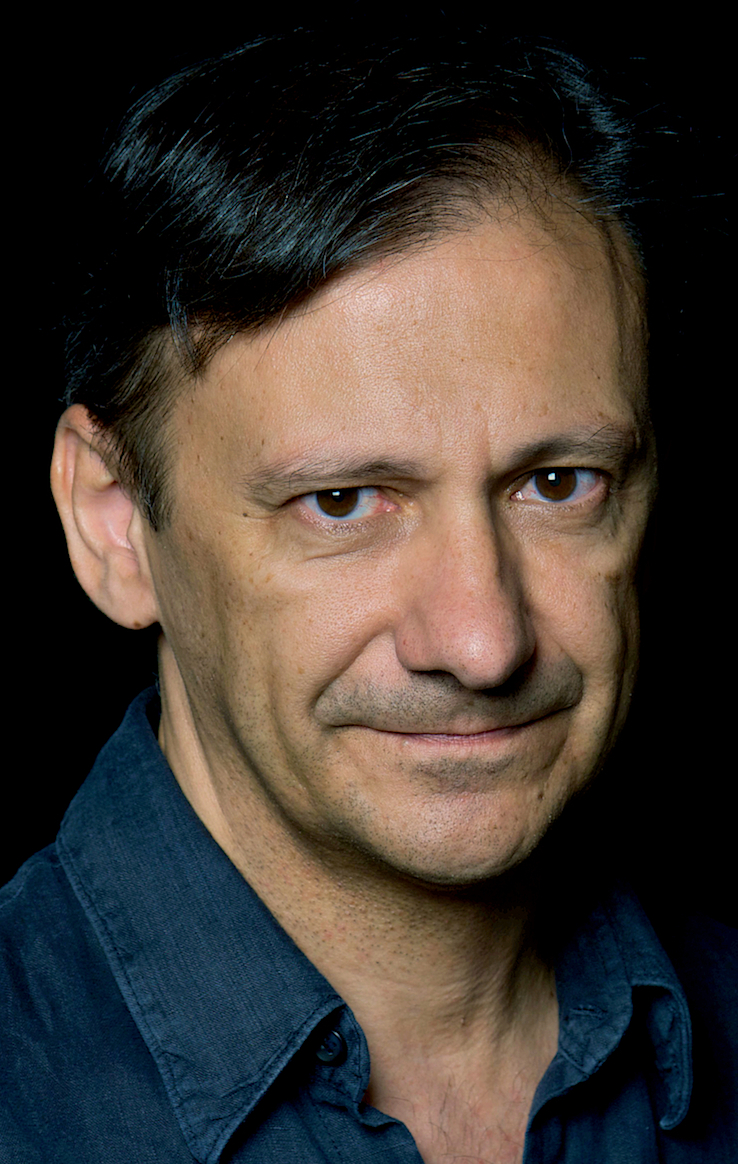
- Born: 6 June 1961 (age 65)
- Occupations: Actor, producer, film director and theatre director

Jorge de Juan García (born 6 June 1961) is a Spanish film and theatre actor, producer and director, known artistically as Jorge de Juan. In 2016 he founded the Spanish Theatre Company (STC) which is the first charity in the history of the British theatre dedicated to the production of both Spanish and Latin-American plays at the Cervantes Theatre of London. This theater was created as well by Jorge de Juan as the home of the Spanish Theatre Company.

== Biography ==
=== Early life and education ===
Jorge de Juan was born into a very artistic family in Cartagena, Spain, in 1961. At the age of 17 he decided to be an actor and entered the Royal School of Dramatic Art of Madrid in 1978, graduating three years later.

In 1979 he made his full debut, when he was still at the school, in Five hours with Mario, directed by Josefina Molina in the Theatre Marquina, Madrid. Then Miguel Narros cast him in Macbeth at the Teatro Español de Madrid.

In 1981 Jorge de Juan moved to London where he studied direction and production at the British Theatre Association. Michael McCallion was his voice teacher; he had classes with Clifford Williams and David Perry. Around the same time, he assisted Ian McKellen in directing Acting Shakespeare, at Teatro Español de Madrid.

=== Career ===
On his return to Spain in 1982, Jaime Chávarri, cast him in what would be his debut film, Bicycles Are for the Summer, and at the same time he was called by José Luis Gómez to appear in the very successful Oedipus Rex, directed by Stavros Doufexis.

Since then, Jorge de Juan has combined his work as an actor and producer in both theatre and film, and in the past decade as a director, too. He produced and performed in Kiss of the Spider Woman, directed by Felipe Vega.

From 1998, the success of the play The Woman in Black led him to perform it more than 400 times with Emilio Gutiérrez Caba. He produced the same play, in 2007, again appearing with Caba, and directed by Eduardo Bazo. They repeated their former success and reached a thousand shows over the two productions.

In 2009, he produced, co-directed and starred in the play The 39 Steps, in his own version of Patrick Barlow's adaptation of the Hitchcock classic. In 2012 he starred in Hay que Deshacer la Casa, in which Andoni Ferreño played the lead. And he starred in, produced and directed the second run of his The 39 Steps.

As a film and television actor his credits include a total of 36 films and TV series, with roles in El Mejor de los Tiempos, Nadie como tú, Manos de Seda, Aquitania, Otra Ciudad, La sombra de Caín, and Imaginario, amongst others. Then in Spanish or English, there have been Open your Eyes, One of the Hollywood Ten, Talk of Angels, Beltenebros, Las Razones de mis Amigos, and Bicycles Are for the Summer, etc.

Jorge de Juan was awarded the Francisco Rabal Film award for his starring role in El Mejor de los Tiempos by Vega, (winner of the San Sebastián International Film Festival). Furthermore, he received the Billboard Turia Theatre Award in 1998 for his performance in The Woman in Black.

One of his most significant achievements was being the director of El Palenque in the Seville Expo '92 For three and a half years he coordinated the construction and design of the 10,000 square metres (110,000 sq ft) space, its programming, its staffing and management, the booking of shows. At the same time, he developed a specific plan of operations for the Expo period. Under his direction over a period of six months there were 1,162 performances, as well as official events for the 110 countries involved, their government agencies and businesses. He was personally responsible for receiving kings, heads of states, prime ministers, ministers and other personalities.

As a result of all this experience he created El Palenque Productions SL in Valencia with the aim of developing film and theatre projects. Their first jobs were the short film M de Amor and the production of the Miradas series: 48 30-minute episodes on different topics to do with the Valencian community, commissioned by the Government of Valencia.

He wrote and produced the feature film Bala Perdida starring David Carradine and Juanjo Puigcorbé. It was awarded Best Feature Film and Best Soundtrack at the Mostra de Valencia Cinema. Furthermore, he co-produced the feature film Imaginario with Dexiderius Productions. He was also associate producer on the film Kordon by Serbian director Goran Markovic (Montreal World Film Festival, The New Directors Award at the Montpellier Festival, Special Prize Festival Jury Orense).

More recently he co-directed and produced the theatre hit End of the Rainbow by Peter Quilter in the Marquina theatre in Madrid. Next he was the executive producer and co-director of Dracula.

He had been a member of the Board of Directors of AISGE (Management Society for Actors and Performers' Rights) and had been a patron of the Foundation AISGE. He is a member of the Academy of Arts and Cinematographic Sciences of Spain. On two occasions, he was a member of the Expert Committee of the Ministry of Culture.

He currently lives in London, where in 2014 he founded the Spanish Theatre Company a charity whose aim is to bring Spanish and Latin-American culture to London through the Cervantes Theater. The Cervantes Theatre was built in 2016 at Southwark as the home of the Spanish Theatre Company to promote Spanish language dramatic arts. Also, he is an associate director of companies such as Fourth Monkey, where he has directed The Grain Store and The Public, and Marquina Theatre Group (Madrid). As a director in the Spanish Theatre Company, he has done different productions such as The House of Bernarda Alba, Blood Wedding and The Judge of the Divorces… and others. In addition, he has done the dramaturgy of the show She Said for the English National Ballet, choreographed by Annabelle López Ochoa, Yabin Wang and Aszure Barton.

== Films ==
=== Lead ===
- Mientras Haya Luz (Dir. Felipe Vega). CIGA prize, Best Film Prize, in the San Sebastián International Film Festival. Best Film Prize in the Festival de Alcalá de Henares. 1986.
- El Mejor de los Tiempos (Dir. Felipe Vega). Zabaltegui Prize in the San Sebastián International Film Festival. Best Film Prize in los Festivales de Alcalá de Henares y Murcia. 1989.
- El Anónimo (Dir. Alfonso Arandia). 1989.
- No Me Ccompliques la Vida (Dir. Ernesto del Río). 1990.
- Nadie Como Tú (Dir. Criso Renovell). 1996.
- Manos de Seda (Dir. Cesar Martínez). 1997.
- La Sombra de Cain (Dir. Paco Lucio). 1998.
- Aquitania (Dir. Rafa Montesinos). 2004.
- Imaginario (Dir. Pablo Cantos). 2008.

=== Supporting ===
- Bicycles Are for the Summer (Las bicicletas son para el verano) (Dir. Jaime Chávarri). 1983.
- La reina del mate (Dir. Fermín Cabal). 1984.
- Prince of Shadows (Beltenebros) (Dir. Pilar Miró). 1990.
- The Worst Years of Our Lives (Los peores años de nuestra vida) (Dir. Emilio Martínez Lázaro). 1993.
- Talk of Angels (Pasiones rotas) (Dir. Nick Hamm). 1994.
- Puede ser divertido (Dir. Azucena Rodríguez). 1995.
- Brujas (Dir. Alvaro Fernández Armero). 1995.
- Open Your Eyes (Abre los Ojos) (Dir. Alejandro Amenábar). 1997.
- Las razones de mis amigos (Dir. Gerardo Herrero). 1999.
- One of the Hollywood Ten (Punto de mira) (Dir. Karl Francis). 2000.
- Juego de Luna (Dir. Mónica Laguna). 2000.
- Una ciudad de otro mundo (Dir. Daniel Múgica). 2001.
- Saharaui, historias de una guerra (Dir. Pedro Rosado). 2003.
- Arena en los Bolsillos (Dir. César Martínez). 2005.
- El sindrome de Svensson (Dir. Kepa Sojo). 2005.
- Frozen Silence (Silencio en la nieve) (Dir. Gerardo Herrero). 2012.

== Television ==
=== Lead ===
- Los caprichos (Jaime Chávarri). For TVE. 1984.
- El número marcado (Juan Manuel Chumilla) Elías Querejeta for TVE. 1987.
- Passover (Jamil Dehiavi). Film for the BBC. (As actor and Executive Producer). 1993.
- Hospital (Joan Guitar). Serie de Antena 3. 1996.
- El beso de la mujer araña (Pedro Amalio López) Recording of the play for TVE. 1996.
- Otra ciudad (Best TV Movie of the Year Prize from la Academia de Televisión and from los Premios Tirant de Valencia). 2005.
- Para que nadie olvide tu nombre (César Martínez). TV Movie for Canal NOU, TV3 and FORTA. 2005.

=== Supporting ===
- Richard III Recording of the play for TVE. 1983.
- Página de sucesos (Dir. Antonio Giménez Rico). For TVE. 1984.
- Turno de oficio (Dir. Antonio Mercero). TVE. 1985.
- Un chupete para ella Pedro Masó for A3. 2000–01.
- El síndrome de Ulises Series of TV fiction for A3

== Theatre ==
=== Lead ===
- Caligula by Camus. (Dir. A. Mantovani). 1979.
- Yvonne, Princesa de Borgoña by Gombrowich. (Dir. Jorge Eines). 1981.
- La ciudad y los perros by Vargas Llosa. (Dir. Edgar Saba).1982.
- Medea es un buen chico by Luis Riaza. (Dir. Luis Vera). 1984.
- Blood Wedding by F. G. Lorca (Dir. José Luis Gómez), Tour of South America. Jerusalem y Edinburgh festivals. 1985/7.
- Motor by Alvaro del Amo. (Dir. Guillermo Heras). BERCEUSE by Luis de Pablo. Festival de Otoño (Dr. Piere Audi, Dr. del Teatro Almeida de Londres). 1988.-
- Caricias de Sergi Belbel. C.N.N.T.E. (Dir. Guillermo Heras). 1994.-
- El beso de la mujer araña by Manuel Puig. (As actor y producer). 1995/6.
- La Mujer de Negro by Susan Hill and Stephen Mallatratt. (Dir. Rafael Calayatud). 1998/00.
- La Mujer de Negro by Susan Hill and Stephen Mallatratt. (Dir. Eduardo Bazo). 2006/08. Produced by his own producer.
- The 39 Steps (Alfred Hitchcock) by Patrick Barlow adapted by Jorge de Juan. (Dir. Eduardo Bazo y Jorge de Juan). Produced by his own producer.
- Hay que deshacer la casa by Sebastián Junyent (Dir. Andoni Ferreño). 2011/12.
- The 39 Steps (Alfred Hitchcock) by Patrick Barlow adapted by Jorge de Juan. New version (Dir. Jorge de Juan y Eduardo Bazo). 2012/13.
- Hay que deshacer la casa de Sebastián Junyent (Dir. Andoni Ferreño). New version together with Andoni Ferreño. 2013.

=== Supporting ===
- Five Hours with Mario by Miguel Delibes. (Dir. Josefina Molina). 1979.
- Macbeth by Shakespeare. (Dir.Miguel Narros). 1980.
- The Acharnians by Aristophanes. (Dir. Roberto Villanueva, as actor and assistant director). 1981.
- Oedipus Rex by Sophocles. (Dir. Stavros Doufenixis). Tour of Spain. 1982.
- Richard III by Shakespeare (Dir. Clifford Williams). 1983.
- En el corazón del teatro, Work about Hamlet. (Dir. Guillermo Heras). 1983.
- Absalon by Calderón. (Dir. José Luis Gómez). 1983.

== Director and Producer ==
=== Director ===
- Works on numerous publicity shoots as assistant director, and on production, and as a casting director for numerous commercial brands.
- Founds 2Cs in Madrid, company, with seat in London, dedicated to multimedia production, which produces and films company videos and presentations. 1989.
- Director of El Palenque in the Seville Expo '92. 1990/92.
- M de amor Short film (Directed by Pau Martínez). 2001. Produced by his El Palenque Producciones S.L., en Valencia. 2001
- Ricardo Muñoz Suay memorias del otro Directs and produces the documentary. 2009
- Al final del arcoíris by Peter Quilter. Co-directs, with Eduardo Bazo, and produces, for the Teatro Marquina. 2011
- Dracula by H.Deane and J.Balderston in a version of Jorge de Juan. Co-directs, with Eduardo Bazo, and works as Executive Producer, for the Teatro Marquina. 2012
- The 39 Steps. Directs the new version of (Alfred Hitchcock) by Patrick Barlow adapted by Jorge de Juan. Produced by his own company. 2012
- The Judge of the Divorces. 2015.
- The Public. Directed in collaboration with Fourth Monkey. 2015.
- Blood Wedding. 2016.
- The Grain Store. 2016
- The Judge of the Divorces… and others. 2017.
- The House of Bernarda Alba. 2017/ 2018.
- Yerma. 2019.

=== Producer ===
- M de amor Short film (Directed by Pau Martínez). 2001. Produced by his El Palenque Producciones S.L., en Valencia. 2001
- Bala Perdida Producer and screenwriter (Directed by Pau Martínez and starring David Carradine and Juanjo Puigcorbé. Prize for the Best Feature Film and Best Soundtrack in La Mostra Cinema de Valencia). 2002
- Kordon Associate producer of the feature film by Serbian director Goran Markovic, Great Prize Montreal Festival, Prize for the Best Feature Film, Jury's Special Prize Orense Festival. 2003.
- La Golondrina producer at the Cervantes Theatre of London. 2018.
- New Spanish Playwriting Season I. 2017.

== Dramatised Readings ==
- Hay que deshacer la casa. 2014.
- The House of Bernadeta. 2014.
- Olvida los tambores. 2014.
- The night. 2015.
- Eloise is under an almond tree. 2015.
- Nina. 2015.
- La lengua en pedazos. 2015.
- The Butterfly’s Evil Spell. Part of the Federico García Lorca Season. 2017.
- Don Perlimplín and Belisa in the Garden. Part of the Federico García Lorca Season. 2017
- The Litle Pony (New Spanish Playwriting Season I). 2017.

== Awards ==
Semana de cine español de Murcia

Year	Award	Category	Film	Result
1990	Francisco Rabal Film Award	Best Actor	El Mejor de los Tiempos	Winner
1999	Turia Theatre Award	Special Theatre Award	La Mujer de Negro	Winner
2003	Mostra de Valencia Cinema Awards	Best film Best Soundtrack	Lost Bullet	Winner
2003	Montréal World Film Festival	Grand Prix des Amériques (Best Film)	Kordon	Winner
