= Olatz =

Female given name

- Gender: Female
- Language: Basque

Origin
- Meaning: place of the cabins
- Region of origin: Basque Country

Olatz is a Basque feminine given name meaning "place of the cabins".

== People ==
- Olatz Arregui (born 1999), Spanish slalom canoeist
- Olatz Ganboa (born 1985), Spanish actress
- Olatz Garamendi (born 1968), Spanish politician
- Olatz Gorrotxategi (born 1982), Spanish actress
- Olatz Rivera Olmedo (born 1996), Spanish football referee

== See also ==
- Hermitage of Our Lady of Olatz
