= Breaking Walls =

- Theatrical release poster
- Spanish: Los aitas
- Directed by: Borja Cobeaga
- Screenplay by: Borja Cobeaga; Valentina Viso
- Produced by: Valérie Delpierre; Alex Lafuente; Nahikari Ipiña
- Starring: Quim Gutiérrez; Juan Diego Botto; Mikel Losada; Iñaki Ardanaz; Laura Weissmahr; Ramón Barea
- Cinematography: Bet Rourich
- Edited by: Sofi Escudé
- Music by: Aránzazu Calleja
- Production companies: Inicia Films; BTeam Prods; Sayaka Producciones; Despadres AIE; Umedia
- Distributed by: BTeam Pictures
- Release dates: 18 March 2025 (Málaga); 21 March 2025 (Spain)
- Countries: Spain; Belgium
- Language: Spanish

Breaking Walls (Spanish: Los aitas, lit. 'the dads') is a 2025 comedy road film directed by Borja Cobeaga and co-written by Valentina Viso. It stars Quim Gutiérrez, Juan Diego Botto, Iñaki Ardanaz, and Mikel Losada.

== Plot ==
Set in late 1980s, the plot follows a group of uninterested fathers from the working-class periphery of Bilbao begrudgingly charged with accompanying their daughters to a rhythmic gymnastics competition in Berlin as the mothers are unable to attend.

== Cast ==
- Quim Gutiérrez
- Juan Diego Botto
- Ramón Barea
- Sofía Otero
- Irati Goitia
- Mara Garcés Renedo
- Vera López
- Irati García
- Aitor Sanz Álvarez
- Iñaki Ardanaz
- Mikel Losada
- Laura Weissmahr

== Production ==
Borja Cobeaga wrote the screenplay alongside Valentina Viso. Cobeaga billed the film as a "road movie that seeks to move and make people laugh". The film was produced by Inicia Films, BTeam Prods, and Sayaka Producciones alongside Umedia and it had the backing from ICEC, Movistar Plus+, RTVE, EITB, TV3, ICAA, and the Basque Government. Shooting locations in Biscay included the Santa María Ikastetxea school in Portugalete. Bet Rourich lensed the film.

== Release ==
The film was presented at the 28th Málaga Film Festival on 18 March 2025. Distributed by BTeam Pictures, it is scheduled to be released theatrically in Spain on 21 March 2025.

== Accolades ==
Year	Award	Category	Nominee(s)	Result	Ref.
2026	9th ALMA Awards	Best Screenplay in a Comedy Film	Borja Cobeaga, Valentina Viso	Nominated	

== See also ==
- List of Spanish films of 2025
