= Friends Have Reasons =

- Theatrical release poster
- Spanish: Las razones de mis amigos
- Directed by: Gerardo Herrero
- Screenplay by: Ángeles González-Sinde
- Based on: La conquista del aire by Belén Gopegui
- Produced by: Gerardo Herrero; Javier López Blanco
- Starring: Marta Belaustegui; Joel Joan; Sergi Calleja; Lola Dueñas; José Tomé; Paz Gómez; Jorge de Juan; Roberto Enríquez; Víctor Clavijo; Ricardo Moya; Ana Duato
- Cinematography: Alfredo Mayo
- Edited by: Carmen Frías
- Music by: Lucio Godoy
- Production company: Tornasol Films
- Distributed by: Alta Films
- Release dates: September 2000 (TIFF); 3 November 2000 (Spain)
- Country: Spain
- Language: Spanish

Friends Have Reasons (Spanish: Las razones de mis amigos) is a 2000 Spanish drama film directed by Gerardo Herrero from a screenplay by Ángeles González-Sinde based on a novel by Belén Gopegui. It stars Marta Belaustegui, Joel Joan, and Sergi Calleja.

== Plot ==
Set in Madrid in the 1990s, the plot explores the crisis in the friendship between Marta, Santiago, and Carlos, after Carlos asks Marta and Santiago for money so he can keep his IT company afloat.

== Cast ==
- Marta Belaustegui as Marta
- Joel Joan as Santiago
- Sergi Calleja as Carlos
- Lola Dueñas as Ainhoa
- José Tomé as Guillermo
- Ana Duato as Leticia
- Paz Gómez as Sol
- Ricardo Moya as Lucas
- Jorge de Juan as Pablo
- Roberto Enríquez as Vicente
- Víctor Clavijo as Esteban
- Sonia Almarcha

== Production ==
Written by Ángeles González-Sinde the film is an adaptation of the novel La conquista del aire by Belén Gopegui. The film was produced by Tornasol Films.

== Release ==
Kevin Williams Associates (KWA) acquired global sales rights to the film. The film's festival run included selections for screenings in the 'Contemporary World Cinema' sidebar programming of the 2000 Toronto International Film Festival, the 45th Valladolid International Film Festival, and the 'Panorama' section of the 51st Berlin International Film Festival. Distributed by Alta Films, the film was released theatrically in Spain on 3 November 2000.

== Reception ==
Eddie Cockrell of Variety described the "Rohmerish" film as "an insightful drama from a precise Angeles Gonzalez-Sinde script".

Ángel Fernández-Santos of El País deemed the film to be "admirably constructed from its foundation, from its writing, which follows a gradual ascetic development, dry and harsh".

Jennifer Green of ScreenDaily considered that the film "gives a faithful portrayal of modern-day, Madrid-dwelling professionals, though perhaps with aspects more attuned to an even older generation than the one depicted here".

== See also ==
- List of Spanish films of 2000
