= Klara Badiola =

Spanish actress (born 1954)

- Badiola in 2026
- Born: Klara Badiola Zubillaga; 1954 (age 71–72); San Sebastián, Spain
- Education: University of Deusto
- Occupation: Actress
- Years active: 1981–present

Klara Badiola Zubillaga (born 1954) is a Spanish actress best known for her work in Basque-language film and television.

== Biography ==
Badiola was born in the Parte Zaharra neighborhood of San Sebastián. Her father worked for Correos and her mother was a homemaker. She earned a degree in romance studies from the University of Deusto and also studied drama at Dantzerti in Bilbao.

She worked a teacher for two years, however, finding that there was limited Basque-language media for children at the time, she co-created Xaribari, a theater group that would perform radio plays in Basque on Herri Irratia. She was later discovered by Imanol Uribe when he was casting for his film Escape from Segovia (1981).

== Filmography ==
=== Film ===
Year	Title	Role	Ref.
1981	Escape from Segovia	Maruja	
1983	La conquista de Albania	Joanna, Duchess of Durazzo	
1985	Ehun metro	Madelene	
1987	El amor de ahora	Arantza	
1989	Eskorpion	Silvia	
1989	El mar es azul	Clara	
1991	Negua Lisboan	Nurse	
1991	Anything for Bread	Sor Inés	
1992	Vacas	Madalen	
1993	Urte ilunak	Mother	
1997	Todo está oscuro	Leonor	
1999	Ione, igo zerura	Sor Maria Jesus	
2001	Jaizkibel	Yvonne	
2003	Entre ciclones	Adriana	
2003	El final de la noche	Sofía	
2006	Ahots ona	Begoña	
2007	Cosmos	Carmen	
2008	The Good News	Clara	
2010	Izarren argia	Emelina	
2011	Bi anai	Carmen's mother	
2015	Amama	Isabel	
2018	The Tree of Blood	Ane	
2020	Nora	Ama	
2024	Ombuaren itzala	Otaño's aunt	
TBA	Canción animal	TBA	

=== Television ===
Year	Title	Role	Notes	Ref.
1999	El comisario	Jesús's mother	1 episode	
2000	Plats bruts	Mertxe	13 episodes	
2002	Hospital Central	Amalia	1 episode	
2006	Balbemendi	Rosa	Season 1	
2007	Hospital Central	Carmen	1 episode	
2020	Alardea	Edurne	4 episodes	
2025	Argi Gorriak	Concha	8 episodes	
