= Luna's Game =

- Theatrical release poster
- Spanish: Juego de Luna
- Directed by: Mónica Laguna
- Screenplay by: Mónica Laguna
- Produced by: Andrés Vicente Gómez
- Starring: Ana Torrent; Carlos Kaniowsky; José Pedro Carrión; Manuel San Martín; Jorge de Juan; Dafne Fernández; Antonio Dechent; Ernesto Alterio
- Cinematography: Teo Delgado
- Edited by: Pablo Blanco
- Music by: Suso Saiz
- Production companies: Enrique Cerezo PC; Iberoamericana Films Producción; Lolafilms
- Release dates: June 2001 (Málaga); 28 September 2001 (Spain)
- Country: Spain
- Language: Spanish

Luna's Game (Spanish: Juego de Luna) is a 2001 Spanish drama film directed by Mónica Laguna which stars Ana Torrent.

== Plot ==
Luna has been groomed into becoming a poker player since she was a child. Now a professional player, she has to settle some debts.

== Cast ==
- Ana Torrent as Luna
- Ernesto Alterio as Nano
- Carlos Kaniowsky as Leo
- José Pedro Carrión as Charly
- Manuel San Martín as Juan
- Jorge de Juan as Juan's father
- Dafne Fernández as Luna (age 14)
- Antonio Dechent as César
- Fernando Cayo
- Gara Muñoz as Luna (age 7)
- Carlos Bardem as Reyes
- Alber Ponte as Miki
- Manuel Morón as Reca Montero

== Release ==
The film was presented at the 4th Málaga Film Festival in June 2001. It also made it to the main competition slate of the 36th Karlovy Vary International Film Festival.

== Reception ==
Dan Fainaru of ScreenDaily described the film as "a disappointing attempt to deal with two different types of addiction", taking "far too many short cuts and avoids too many pertinent questions to deal with the many tasks it sets for itself".

== Accolades ==
Year	Award	Category	Nominee(s)	Result	Ref.
2001	4th Málaga Film Festival	Best Director	Mónica Laguna	Won	

== See also ==
- List of Spanish films of 2001
