= To an Unknown God =

- Theatrical release poster
- Spanish: A un dios desconocido
- Directed by: Jaime Chávarri
- Written by: Elías Querejeta; Jaime Chávarri
- Produced by: Elías Querejeta
- Starring: Héctor Alterio; María Rosa Salgado; Javier Elorriaga; Rosa Valenti; Ángela Molina
- Cinematography: Teo Escamilla
- Edited by: Pablo G. del Amo
- Music by: Luis de Pablo
- Release date: September 16, 1977
- Running time: 104 minutes
- Country: Spain
- Language: Spanish

To an Unknown God (Spanish: A un dios desconocido) is a 1977 Spanish drama film directed by Jaime Chávarri. It stars Héctor Alterio, Xabier Elorriaga, Ángela Molina, Mercedes Sampietro, Rosa Valenty and Mirta Miller.

The story features a homosexual magician who remembers the time when he used to live close to poet Federico García Lorca. It was a pioneer in its frank and mature examination of homosexuality.

== Plot ==
José, a middle age magician, is an elegant discreet homosexual who lives alone and has an occasional affair with Miguel, a young politician who finds it more convenient in Madrid's high society to marry than assert his homosexuality. José is a man romantically possessed and obsessed by his childhood in Granada during the outbreak of the Spanish Civil War in the spring of 1936.

Now in his fifties, José returns to Granada and relives his childhood there. A time when he fell in love with Federico García Lorca and had a youthful affair with one of Lorca's own lovers. Memories come flooding back to the mature José, of youthful sexual conquest, of Lorca's murder at the hands of Francisco Franco's agents, and his own early homosexual affairs. José's entire life is colored by his obsessions with García Lorca, his unknown God, to whom the film is dedicated.

José travels twice to Granada. First, he revisits a woman who is also obsessed with García Lorca's memory, and steals a photograph of the boy with whom he had his first sexual encounter; later, José returns to Madrid, to a party in search of his youth, and meets a pianist with whom he had sexual relations many years before but now does not remember.

When José returns to Madrid, he is a man tormented by his past, and in search of peace. Listening to a taped recording of García Lorca's famous "Ode to Walt Whitman", he desires nothing more than to face the rest of his life in loneliness, although his recent lover, Miguel has returned to his bed and wants to continue their affair. José realizes that he is really all alone in their world, alone with his God.

== Cast ==
- Héctor Alterio as José
- Xabier Elorriaga as Miguel
- María Rosa Salgado as Adela
- Rosa Valenty as Clara
- Ángela Molina as Soledad
- Margarita Mas as older Soledad
- Mercedes Sampietro as Mercedes
- José Joaquin Boza as Pedro
- Mirta Miller as Ana
- José Pagán as Julio
- Emilio Siegrist as Jorge
- Marisa Porcel as Emilia
- Antonio Bermejo
- Yelena Samarina
- Antonio Chinarro

== Reception ==
Author Ronald Schwartz wrote "many European and Spanish critics were astonished by Chávarri's frank and unhysterical treatment of homosexuality; the film is a totally mature exploration of an extremely controversial theme, never before dealt with by a Spanish director; Chávarri keeps the sex and poetry beautifully under control; the film is lovely to look at, highly cultivated and poised; it is sensitive, allusive, graceful, intelligent, moving, in short, a masterpiece of Spanish cinema."

Film critic Vincent Canby said the film is a "handsome, densely packed, evocative movie that makes a lot of rather stern demands on anyone who sees it; it is the sort of thing one should prepare for; the movie is lovely to look at, highly cultivated and poised and very, very difficult to get to know."

Sheila Johnston of Time Out observed "praised for its political treatment and theme, it's actually less a crusading attack on sexual repression than an oblique meditation, inlaid with Lorca's lyrical if equally enigmatic verse, on homoeroticism, growing old, trying not to be afraid, relinquishing lost illusions and childhood dreams; and a muted but sympathetic portrait of the ageing prestidigitator."

== Awards ==
The film was the Grand Prize winner at the Chicago International Film Festival of 1978 and was part of the American Film Institute series of Spanish films which traveled throughout North America in 1979–1980. Hector Alterio also won the Best actor award at the San Sebastian Film Festival in 1977 for his performance as José. It also won 3 awards at the San Sebastián International Film Festival for Best Spanish Film, Best Actor and an OCIC Award (a prize that honored films deemed to have significant artistic merit and to convey positive human or spiritual values).

== See also ==
- List of Spanish films of 1977
- List of LGBTQ-related films of 1977

== Sources ==
- Canby, Vincent (July 16, 1982). "To an Unknown God". The New York Times. p. C12.
- Johnston, Sheila (September 10, 2012). "To an Unknown God". Time Out.
- Schwartz, Ronald (2008). "The Seventies". Great Spanish Films Since 1950. Scarecrow Press. pp. 53–55. ISBN 978-0-8108-5405-5.
