= Blindfolded Eyes =

1978 film

- Promotional poster
- Directed by: Carlos Saura
- Written by: Carlos Saura
- Produced by: Tony Molière; Claude Pierson; Elías Querejeta
- Starring: Geraldine Chaplin; José Luis Gómez
- Cinematography: Teodoro Escamilla
- Edited by: Pablo González del Amo
- Music by: Henry Purcell
- Release date: 18 May 1978
- Running time: 110 minutes
- Country: Spain
- Language: Spanish

Blindfolded Eyes (Spanish: Los ojos vendados) is a 1978 Spanish drama film directed by Carlos Saura. It was entered into the 1978 Cannes Film Festival.

== Plot ==
An executive director makes an impassioned speech before a tribunal, pleading for the release of world prisoners held in death camps based on verified testimonial evidence. He steps aside, and allows Inés, an Argentine torture victim, to give her testimony, dressed in a raincoat and with dark glasses to protect her identity. Moved by the speech, Luis, an acting instructor, decides to write a play about victims of political repression and torture. He arrives at the residence of his friend Emilia, who is married to his dentist Manuel. There, she tells Luis about her desire to become an actress. He invites her to study at his drama studio. While Luis is having dental work done by Manuel (and calling his equipment "medieval torture devices"), he has a vision of three men apprehending Emilia and blindfolding her in the back of a vehicle.

At home, Luis can't sleep. He goes to his desk and uncrumples a threatening letter demanding that he abandon what he's working on or face consequences. The next day, Emilia arrives at Luis's drama school as he's instructing his students to work on their body performance in their acting; at his insistence she joins in, though reluctant to fully participate. In the next scene, Luis is driving along a country road, is suddenly struck by a painful renal colic, parks his vehicle in a field, and lies down on his back, wondering if he's about to die. Manuel and Emilia, driving down the road, see him and stop to assist him. Back at his studio, Luis instructs his students to derive emotional memories from their past to improve their acting.

At his residence, Luis receives another threatening letter. Hearing a buzz, he answers the door and finds Emilia, who tells him that Manuel had struck her. Manuel had complained about Emilia's absences from home and mocked her acting pursuits, and she told him she was moving in with Luis. Luis is surprised and first tells her she's made a mess of things, but then agrees to let her live with him, and the two develop a romantic attraction. Sometime later, Luis visits his uncle Andrés, who sells coal in his cellar. During his childhood, Luis had worked for his uncle after his father died and the family business went under, and Andrés had treated him brutally; Luis remembers being caught writing a short poem about mediating on the meaning of life and being insulted by his uncle. With his uncle's permission, Luis ventures into the coal cellar and remembers or imagines cleaning coal dust off in a shower and being seduced by his aunt.

At his studio, Luis casts Emilia in the lead role of his play. On their drive home, Luis returns to the same country field and positions himself in a death-like state. Later, while Emilia is rehearsing her part, she dreams of being tortured and blindfolded. Rehearsals continue as Emilia reads her part as the torture victim; meanwhile, Luis receives his final threatening letter. Soon after, Emilia returns to Luis's apartment, which has been vandalized and ransacked. Luis has been brutally beaten but is still conscious. Emilia calls Manuel and begs him to come and call an ambulance, and Luis is rushed to the hospital.

The film concludes with the performance of Luis's play; as she finishes her monologue, Emilia is shot dead by assassins, along with Luis and other people onstage, and the audience flees in terror. The camera closes in on Emilia's body.

== Cast ==
- Geraldine Chaplin as Emilia Spencer
- José Luis Gómez as Luis López Ciagar
- Xabier Elorriaga as Manuel
- Lola Cardona as the aunt
- André Falcon as the lawyer
- Manuel Guitián as the uncle
- Carmen Maura as the nurse
- Fabienae Molière
- Judith Cuquele Tarasiuk
- Dominique Lestournel
