= Talk of Angels =

1998 film directed by Nick Hamm

- Directed by: Nick Hamm
- Written by: Kate O'Brien (novel); Ann Guedes (screenplay); Frank McGuinness (screenplay)
- Produced by: Patrick Cassavetti
- Starring: Polly Walker; Frances McDormand; Vincent Perez; Franco Nero
- Cinematography: Aleksey Rodionov
- Edited by: Michael Bradsell; Gerry Hambling
- Music by: Trevor Jones
- Distributed by: Miramax Films
- Release date: 1998
- Running time: 96 minutes
- Country: United States
- Language: English
- Box office: $18,281

Talk of Angels is a film directed in 1996 by Nick Hamm, but not released by its production company, Miramax, until 1998.

Based on the 1936 novel Mary Lavelle by Kate O'Brien, which was banned in Ireland when first published, with a script co-written by Ann Guedes and Frank McGuinness, Talk Of Angels tells the story of a young Irish governess who travels to Spain in the mid-1930s to teach English to the young daughters of a prominent family. Over the course of the film, she becomes drawn to the family's married eldest son, and their affair unfolds with the increasing violence associated with the early days of the Spanish Civil War as a backdrop.

== Cast ==
- Polly Walker as Mary Lavelle
- Vincent Perez as Francisco Areavaga
- Franco Nero as Dr. Vicente Areavaga
- Marisa Paredes as Doña Consuelo
- Leire Berrocal as Milagros
- Penélope Cruz as Pilar
- Frances McDormand as Conlon
- Ruth McCabe as O'Toole
- Francisco Rabal as Don Jorge
- Ariadna Gil as Beatriz
- Rossy de Palma as Elena
- Britta Smith as Duggan
- Anita Reeves as Harty
- Veronica Duffy as Keogh
- Jorge de Juan as Jaime
- Ellea Ratier as Leonor
- Angelina Llongueras as Ana
- Jaume Valls as Pablo
- Jose Sacristan as– Carlos
- Oscar Higares as Matador
- Tusse Silberg as Aunt Cristina
- Jose Manuel Ortigosa as Singing Boy

== Reception ==
The film received mostly unfavorable comparisons to Casablanca, Dr. Zhivago, The Garden of the Finzi-Continis, Jane Eyre, Gone With the Wind, and The Leopard.

Entertainment Weekly described it as "Casablanca-derived" but called the main characters "blandly pretty" and "pretty bland".

The LA Times argued that "Walker remains the primary distraction" and that "the sum, as they all too often say, is not quite that of the parts. And "Talk of Angels" unfortunately exists in that romance-novel realm in which political concerns are mere adornments for the treacle-dripping issues of the heart."

The New York Times noted that "Talk of Angels is the third and weakest movie to be released this year in which the central character is a beautiful, charming, clever, wise young governess who becomes romantically entangled with someone in her employer's family," and complained that it was "so badly butchered in the cutting room that crucial dramatic confrontations are strangely missing."

Variety said in its review that "As the would-be lovers, Walker and Perez are individually charismatic and undeniably attractive, but together they generate about as much heat as Lake Placid in February", continuing that "Talk of Angels doesn't use the politics of war to create tension between the lovers; it's as if the war were irrelevant to their personal drama."

The New York Daily News was favorable, calling it "a romantic, intelligent Jane Eyre-like story" and said that "director Nick Hamm makes a worthy feature debut, backed by a solid cast."

Boxoffice wrote that it "is an undeniably beautiful and often seductive tale of colliding cultural sensibilities and ferocious passions" but that "the passions depicted on-screen are fairly tepid ones, playing more like a dime novel than the meaningful epic the filmmakers intended."

Film4's summary was that it was "elevated above the ordinary by strong performances and a vivacious feel".
