= Prince of Shadows =

1991 film

- Directed by: Pilar Miró
- Written by: Pilar Miró; Mario Camus; Juan Antonio Portos
- Based on: The novel Beltenebros by Antonio Muñoz Molina
- Produced by: Andrés Vicente Gómez
- Starring: Terence Stamp; Patsy Kensit; José Luis Gómez; John McEnery; Simón Andreu; Jorge de Juan; Geraldine James
- Cinematography: Javier Aguirresarobe
- Edited by: José Luis Matesanz
- Music by: José Nieto
- Release date: 13 December 1991
- Running time: 109 minutes
- Country: Spain
- Language: Spanish
- Box office: $1.2 million (Spain)

Beltenebros, also known as Prince of Shadows, is a 1991 Spanish crime-thriller mystery film co-written and directed by Pilar Miró and starring Terence Stamp, Patsy Kensit, José Luis Gómez, Geraldine James and Simón Andreu. It was entered into the 42nd Berlin International Film Festival where it won the Silver Bear for outstanding artistic contribution.

== Synopsis ==
Madrid, 1962. More than twenty years after the Spanish Civil War has ended, an English communist named Darman, who had fought in the International Brigades, comes back to Spain with the mission to find and kill an infiltrated mole or traitor in the clandestine Communist Party. To find the traitor, Darman begins an affair with Rebecca, a lounge singer and the most expensive and beautiful prostitute in Madrid, who seems to be the lover of the man Darman is looking for. But in this dark post-war Francoist Spain not everything is as it seems, and Darman must first search in his past before he can find his real enemy, who is looking for him as well.

== Cast ==
- Terence Stamp as Darman
- Patsy Kensit as Rebeca
- José Luis Gómez as Ugarte / Valdivia
- Geraldine James as Rebeca Osorio
- Simón Andreu as Andrade
- Aleksander Bardini as Bernal (as Aleksander Bardin)
- John McEnery as Walter
- Jorge de Juan as Luque
- Pedro Díez del Corral as Policeman
- Carlos Hipólito as Boite Owner
- Francisco Casares as Train Steward
- Queta Claver as Dancer Boite
- Felipe Vélez as Policeman
- William Job as Howard
- Magdalena Wójcik as Polish Tango Dancer
