= Muted (TV series) =

Spanish psychological thriller television series

- Promotional release poster
- Spanish: El silencio
- Created by: Aitor Gabilondo
- Directed by: Gabe Ibáñez
- Starring: Arón Piper; Almudena Amor; Cristina Kovani; Manu Ríos; Aitor Luna; Ramiro Blas; Aria Bedmar; Mikel Losada
- Country of origin: Spain
- Original language: Spanish
- No. of episodes: 6

Production
- Production company: Alea Media

Original release
- Network: Netflix
- Release: 19 May 2023

Muted (Spanish: El silencio, lit. 'The Silence') is a Spanish psychological thriller television series created by Aitor Gabilondo and directed by Gabe Ibáñez. It premiered on Netflix on 19 May 2023.

== Plot ==
Set in Bilbao, the show revolves around Sergio Ciscar, who has recently been released from detention. He has been temporarily mute during his childhood following to a traumatism and has recovered his faculty of speech only when his parents adopted a little sister. He has spent six years in detention for parricide and is now under the secret watch of a young psychiatrist, Ana Dussuel, and her team. She loves him secretly and she also receives help from Marta, a girl obsessed with Sergio.

Sergio desperately tries to find his younger sister, who was the only one in his family who treated him nicely.

During the course of the series, it’s discovered that Sergio is a genius quick to anger and that his mother, a psychiatrist, was experimenting on him without his father's consent/knowledge.

Towards the end we find out that Sergio is unstable and was on drugs and lashed out and pushed his parents over the balcony of their apartment to their death.

The police are also involved in the watch, but are corrupt and trying to derail the watch.

== Cast ==
- Arón Piper as Sergio Ciscar
- Almudena Amor as Ana Dussuel
- Cristina Kovani as Marta
- Manu Ríos as Eneko
- Aitor Luna as Cabrera
- Ramiro Blas as Natanael
- Aria Bedmar as Greta
- Mikel Losada as Mikel

== Production ==
Created by Aitor Gabilondo, Muted is an Alea Media production for Netflix. Shooting locations included Bilbao and Madrid.

== Release ==
Netflix released the series on 19 May 2023.

== Reception ==
The series has become the second most streamed non-English speaking series on Netflix within the first week of release.
