= The Bastards' Fig Tree =

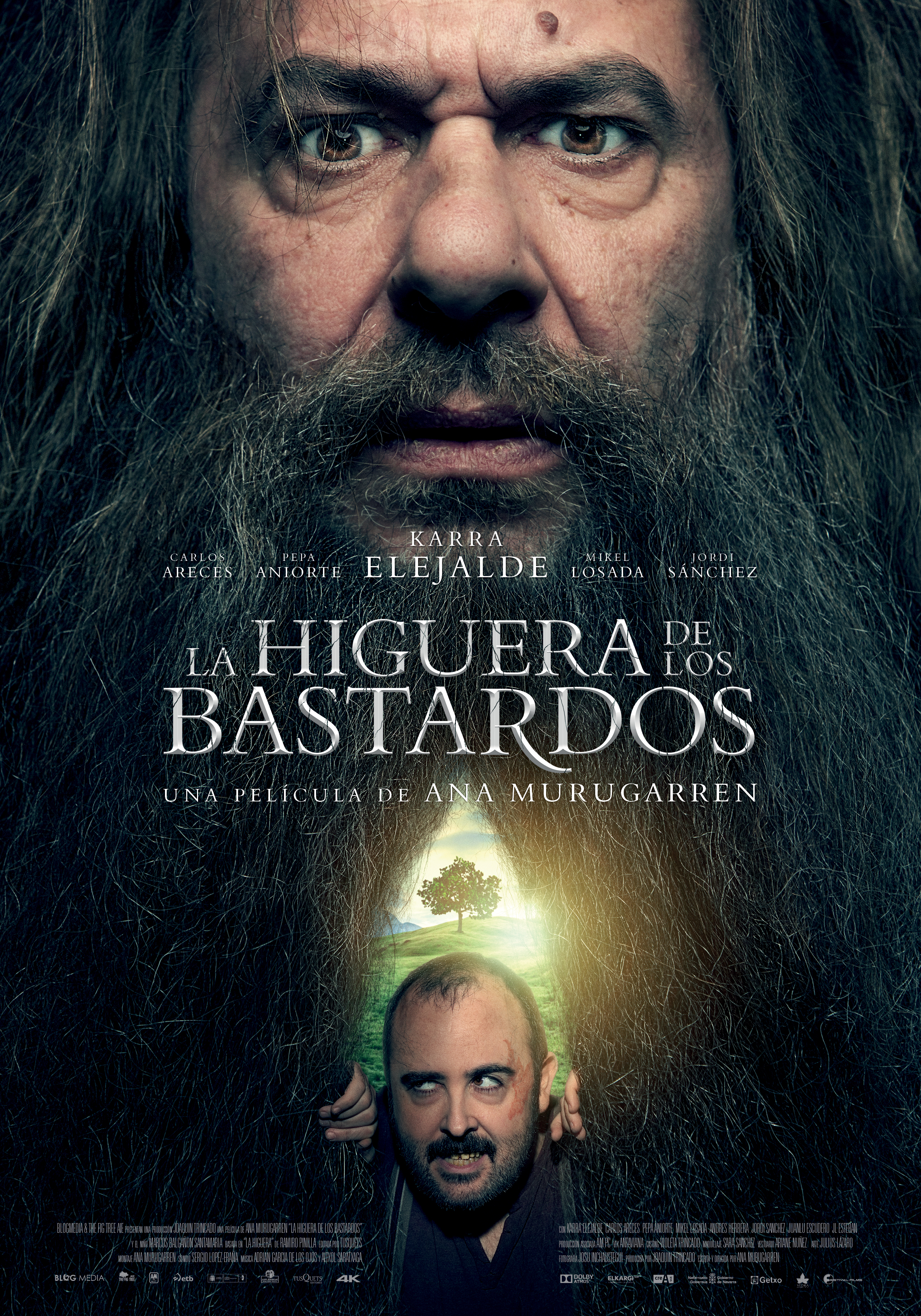
- Spanish: La higuera de los bastardos
- Directed by: Ana Murugarren
- Screenplay by: Ana Murugarren
- Based on: La higuera by Ramiro Pinilla
- Starring: Karra Elejalde; Carlos Areces; Pepa Aniorte; Mikel Losada; Andrés Herrera; Jordi Sánchez; Juanlu Escudero; JL Esteban
- Cinematography: Josu Inchaustegui
- Edited by: Ana Murugarren
- Music by: Adrián García de los Ojos; Aitzol Saratxaga
- Production company: Blogmedia
- Distributed by: Festival Films
- Release dates: 17 September 2017 (Film by the Sea); 24 November 2017 (Spain)
- Country: Spain
- Language: Spanish

The Bastards' Fig Tree (Spanish: La higuera de los bastardos) is a 2017 Spanish comedy-drama film directed by Ana Murugarren which stars Karra Elejalde, with Carlos Areces, Pepa Aniorte, Mikel Losada, and Jordi Sánchez in supporting roles.

== Plot ==
The plot starts in 1939, in the last rales of the War of Spain. Rogelio, a "trigger-happy" fascist, gives a second thought to his ways upon witnessing the hateful gaze of a boy whose parents have been killed by Rogelio. Rogelio thus becomes an anchorite, deciding to take care of the fig tree the boy has planted on their parents' tomb.

== Cast ==
- Karra Elejalde as Rogelio
- Pepa Aniorte as Cipriana
- Jordi Sánchez as Benito Muro
- Carlos Areces as Ermo
- José Luis Esteban
- Andrés Herrera as Luis
- Mikel Losada as Pedro Alberto
- Ramón Barea as Don Eulogio
- Juanlu Escudero
- Eneko Sagardoy
- Ane Gabarain
- Ylenia Baglietto

== Production ==
An adaptation of the novel La higuera by Ramiro Pinilla the screenplay was penned by Ana Murugarren. The film is a Blogmedia production. It was shot in 2016 in Puerto Viejo de Algorta (Getxo, Biscay).

== Release ==
The film premiered at the Vlissingen-based Film by the Sea festival on 14 September 2017. Distributed by Festival Films, it was theatrically released in Spain on 24 November 2017.

== Reception ==
Quim Casas of El Periódico de Catalunya rated the film 1 out of 5 stars, writing that Elejalde Karra Elejalde does not know what to do with his character, whilst the same applies to Areces or Sánchez, "actors gifted for comedy but not for so much nonsense".

Noel Murray of Los Angeles Times wrote that, "thin plot" and "distractingly jaunty score" notwithstanding, the film remains for the most part "a thought-provoking historical fairy tale about the values — and grudges — that survive whomever's [sic] in power".

Nuria Vidal of Fotogramas rated the film 3 out of 5 stars, deeming it to be "a film that moves between esperpento, black comedy and magical realism", citing the meetings between Elejalde's and Areces' characters as the best thing about the film, while lamenting some "unavoidable clichés".

Javier Cazallas of HobbyConsolas rated the film with 78 points ("good") praising the evolution of Rogelio's character both from a personal and a physical standpoint, and the "good characterization of the different characters", while writing that the "story seems to be a bit lacking when it comes to an end" as a negative point.

Sergio F. Pinilla of Cinemanía rated the film 3 out of 5 stars, pointing out that despite being short of the excellence of contiguous films such as or Black Bread or Pan's Labyrinth, the film features both Elejalde and Areces in a state of grace.

== See also ==
- List of Spanish films of 2017
