= Brujas (film) =

- Theatrical release poster
- Directed by: Álvaro Fernández Armero
- Screenplay by: Álvaro Fernández Armero
- Produced by: Enrique Cerezo
- Starring: Penélope Cruz; Neus Asensi; Ana Álvarez; Álex Angulo; Beatriz Carvajal
- Cinematography: Antonio Cuevas
- Edited by: Iván Aledo
- Music by: Mario de Benito
- Production company: Enrique Cerezo PC
- Distributed by: Líder Films
- Release date: 26 April 1996
- Running time: 87 minutes
- Country: Spain
- Languages: Spanish; English

Brujas (transl. Witches) is a 1996 Spanish comedy-drama film written and directed by Álvaro Fernández Armero and starring Penélope Cruz, Neus Asensi, Ana Álvarez, Álex Angulo, and Beatriz Carvajal.

== Cast ==
- Penélope Cruz as Patricia
- Ana Álvarez as Sol
- Beatriz Carvajal as Virginia
- Álex Angulo as Conserje
- Neus Asensi as Coneja
- Roberto Cairo as Paquete
- Pepo Oliva as Marido Virginia
- Armando del Río as Raúl
- Alejandra Grepi as Mujer Heladería
- Adriano Prieto as Hombre Heladería
- Luis Perezagua as Cesáreo
- Kiti Manver as Heladera
- Jorge de Juan as Lucas
- Juan Tébar as Hombre 1
- José R. Paíno as Hombre 2
- Luigi Martin as Hombre 3
- Julio de la Plaza as Cerrajero

== See also ==
- List of Spanish films of 1996
