= Xabier Elorriaga =

Spanish actor

- Born: Xabier González Elorriaga; 1 April 1944 (age 82); Maracaibo, Venezuela

Xabier González Elorriaga (born 1 April 1944 in Maracaibo) is a Spanish film and TV actor, writer and director.

== Biography ==
His exiled parents returned to Bilbao in Spain, in 1969 where he commenced studying Law, Engineering and the Merchant Marine but soon switched to the theatre, becoming well known as an actor in the Bilbao of the 1970s. He then moved to Barcelona where he studied journalism and worked in the university. He made his prize-winning film debut in 1975 with La ciutat cremada and he has subsequently appeared in over 50 films.

A number of these have been released internationally in English, including:

1. The Dancer Upstairs (Pasos de baile, 2002)
2. To Love Too Much (Demasiado amor, 2002)
3. My Mother Likes Women (A mi madre le gustan las mujeres, 2002)
4. Sleeping Beauties (Bellas Durmientes, 2001, English subtitles)
5. Thesis (Tesis, 1996)
6. To the Four Winds (A los cuatro vientos, 1987)
7. The Secret Garden (El jardín secreto, 1984)
8. Man of Fashion (El hombre de moda, 1980)
9. Blindfolded Eyes (Los ojos vendados, 1978)
10. The Burned City (La ciudad quemada, 1976)

Together with Arantxa Urretavizcaya, he is credited with the screenplay of Zorrilla's A los cuatro vientos (1987). He directed the short film Ikuska 4 (1980).

His TV work includes the series Anillos de oro, Clase media, and La verdad de Laura. He has made episodic appearances in Telecinco's Hospital Central and was involved with TVE-1's miniseries Las Cerezas del Cementerio.

== Prizes ==
- 1977 CEC Prize for A un dios desconocido
- 1976 CEC Prize for La ciudad quemada

== Selected filmography ==
Year	Film	Director
2006	Dos billetes	Javier Serrano
2003	La memoria e il perdono	Giorgio Capitani
2001	Bellas Durmientes	Eloy Lozano
1996	Tesis	Alejandro Amenábar
1996	Lejos de África	Cecilia M. Bartolomé
1992	Havanera 1820	Antonio Verdaguer
1989	Días de humo	Antón Exeiza
1987	Captain James Cook	Lawrence Gordon Clark
1987	A los cuatro vientos	José A. Zorrilla
1986	Tata mía	José Luis Borau
1984	La Muerte de Mikel	Imanol Uribe
1984	El jardín secreto	Carlos Suárez
1981	Reborn	Announcer
1981	La fuga de Segovia	Imanol Uribe
1979	Companys, proceso a Cataluña	José María Forn
1978	La oscura historia de la prima Montse	Jordi Cadena
1978	Blindfolded Eyes	
1977	Perros callejeros	José Antonio de la Loma
1977	A un dios desconocido	Jaime Chávarri
1976	La ciudad quemada	Antonio Ribas
