= Mikel Losada =

Basque film, stage, and television actor (born 1978)

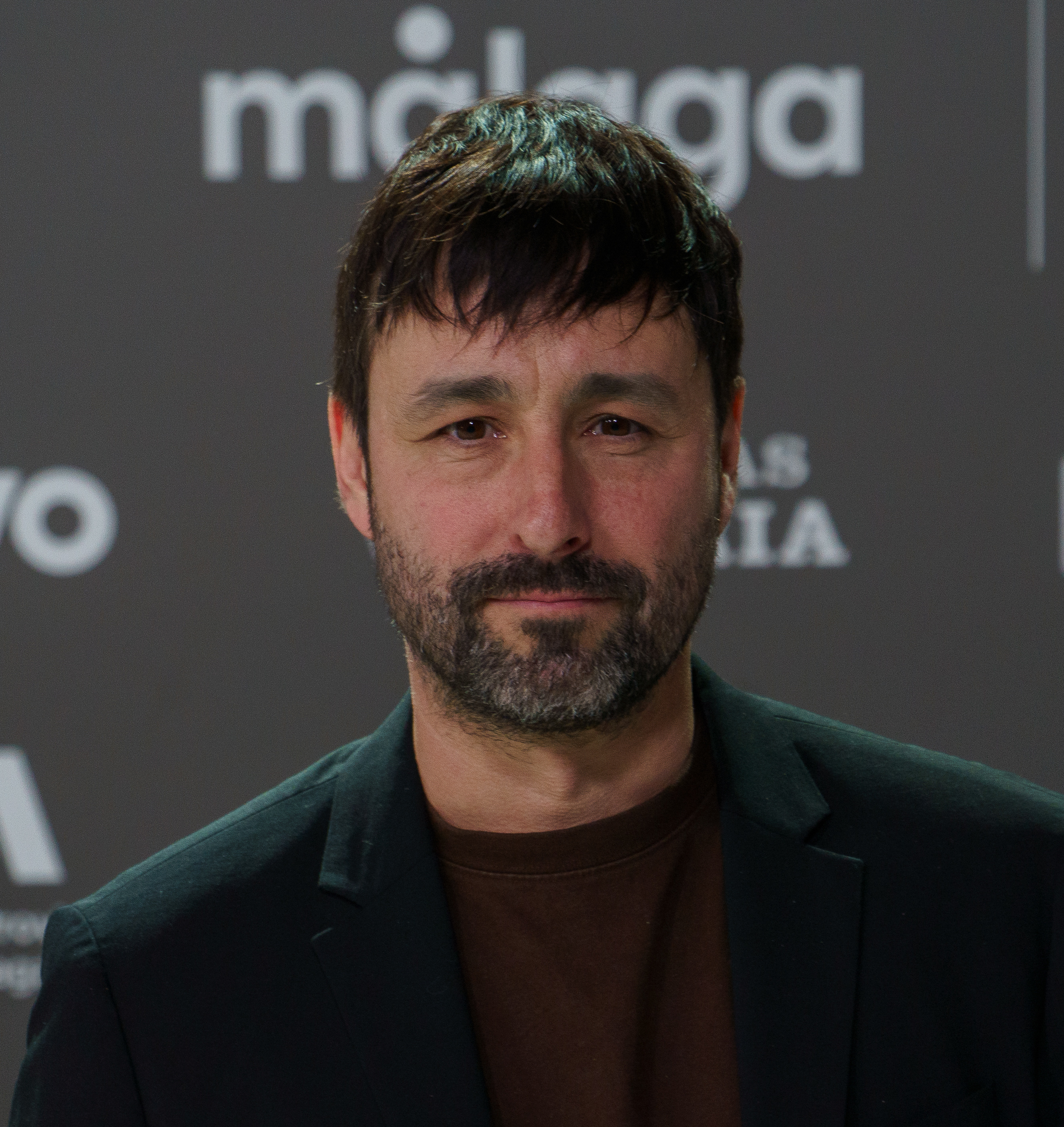
- Mikel Losada at the Málaga Film Festival (2025)
- Born: Mikel Losada García; 28 December 1978 (age 47); Ermua (Basque Country); Spain
- Education: Juan de Antxieta Musical Studies and Performing Arts Center (BA)
- Occupation: Actor
- Years active: 1993–present
- Notable work: Ane Is Missing; Breaking Walls; Cuéntame cómo pasó The Bastards' Fig Tree
- Spouse: Olatz Ganboa
- Children: 1
- Awards: Union of Basque Actors and Actresses Award (2001); Urregin Award (2021)

Mikel Losada García (born in Ermua on 28 December 1978) is a Basque film, theatre and television actor.

He has worked on more than one hundred audiovisual productions, including Ane Is Missing, Breaking Walls, Cuéntame cómo pasó, or Intimacy (Netflix) or Muted (Netflix). He has also worked in more than a hundred theatre productions throughout Spain.

He has been nominated up to three times for the Best Basque Actor Award at the Union of Basque Actors and Actresses Awards (Besarkada Awards), the last time in 2022 for the film Ane Is Missing. In 2001 he won the Award for Best Television Actor at the Union of Basque Actors and Actresses Awards (Besarkada Awards) and was nominated in the same category in 2022 for the Netflix series Intimacy.

== Life and career ==
He was born in Ermua (Basque Country) on 28 December 1978. He studied at the Juan de Antxieta Musical Studies and Performing Arts Center (Bilbao) where he graduated in dramatic art, being a student of Ramón Barea, Felipe Loza and Itziar Lazkano.

At sixteen he got his first roles in theatrical and audiovisual projects. At eighteen he joined Ramón Barea's theatre company. Since then he has worked in more than one hundred audiovisual productions and also in more than one hundred theatre productions.

He has been nominated up to three times for the Best Basque Actor Award at the Union of Basque Actors and Actresses Awards (Besarkada Awards), the last time in 2022 for the film Ane Is Missing. In 2001 he won the Award for Best Television Actor at the Union of Basque Actors and Actresses Awards (Besarkada Awards) and was nominated in the same category in 2022 for the Netflix series Intimacy.

In 2015, he was part of the cast in the theatre production The Seagull, an original production of the Arriaga Theatre, directed by the Argentinean Gustavo Tambascio, together with Gurutze Beitia, Lander Otaola and Ylenia Baglietto. Also in that year he co-starred in the film Txarriboda.

In 2016, he participated in the film The Invisible Guardian (based on the novel by Dolores Redondo), together with Marta Etura. A year later, in 2017, he co-starred in the film La Higuera de los Bastardos, directed by Ana Murugarren.

In 2020, he co-starred in the film Ane Is Missing along with Patricia López Arnaiz. The film received five nominations at the Goya Awards, including the Best Film Award, and won three Goyas.

In 2021 he was part of the theatrical production of the Arriaga Theatre El viaje a ninguna parte, directed by Ramón Barea. Due to his performance in that theatrical production, Losada received the Urregin Award in the category of Best Actor.

In 2021, he co-starred in the film García y García, directed by Ana Murugarren, along with José Mota, Pepe Viyuela and Jordi Sánchez. In 2023 he participated in its sequel García y García 2, also directed by Ana Murugarren.

He is one of the founding partners of the Pabellón Nº 6 project.

In 2025, Losada co-starred in the film Breaking Walls, directed by Borja Cobeaga, alongside Quim Gutiérrez, Juan Diego Botto, Iñaki Ardanaz, Ramón Barea, and Sofía Otero.

In 2025, he performed the theatre production The Glass Menagerie by Tennessee Williams, directed by Natalia Menéndez, a theatrical production of the Arriaga Theatre.

== Private life ==
He currently lives in Bilbao. He is in a relationship with actress Olatz Ganboa. In 2016 she and Losada represented Los amantes del Casco Viejo, a theatre production of the Arriaga Theatre. They also recorded the series Etxekoak together, on ETB 1, in full confinement due to the COVID pandemic in 2020. He has a border collie named Kea.

She has a great friendship with the filmmaker Ana Murugarren and, as she herself has explained, Losada appears in all her films. She also has a very close friendship with the actor Ramón Barea, whom Losada considers his friend and mentor.

== Filmography ==
=== Television ===
- 2023, Muted, Netflix
- 2022, Intimacy, Netflix
- 2022, Tupper Club (invited by Ana Murugarren)
- 2020, Etxekoak
- 2014, No es País para Sosos (special guest)
- 2011, El precio de la libertad
- 2010, Ciudad K
- 2008, Go!azen
- 2001, Cuéntame
- 2001, Goenkale

=== Film ===
- 2025, Breaking Walls, dir. Borja Cobeaga
- 2023 García y García 2, dir. Ana Murugarren
- 2021 García y García
- 2020 Ane Is Missing
- 2019 La pequeña Suiza
- 2017 La higuera de los bastardos
- 2016 Igelak
- 2016 The Invisible Guardian
- 2015 Txarriboda
- 2013 Tres mentiras
- 2013 Alaba zintzoa
- 2012 Bypass
- 2012 El extraño anfitrión (TV)
- 2012 TESLA. VERSIÓN 04
- 2011 El precio de la libertad
- 2010 Dragoi ehiztaria
- 2009 Sukalde kontuak
- 2008 Go!azen
- 2007 Casual Day
- 2006 Kutsidazu bidea, Ixabel
- 2005 Corrientes circulares
- 2005 Hoja de ruta
- 2004 El coche de pedales
- 2001 Lázaro
- 2000 Los amigos
- 1999 Pecados provinciales
- 1994 La voz de su amo

=== Stage ===
- 2025, The Glass Menagerie, dir. Natalia Menéndez
- 2022, Bake Lehorra / La Paz Estéril
- 2022, La cazadora de mitos
- 2021, El viaje a ninguna parte
- 2019, Macbeth
- 2016, Los amantes del casco viejo. Dir. Patxo Tellería
- 2016, Historia casi de mi vida. Dir. Ramón Barea
- 2016, A Midsummer Night's Dream. Dir. Pablo Viar
- 2015, The Seagull. dir. Gustavo Tambascio
- 2014, Fausto Ciudadano Ejemplar, Dir. Galder Pérez y Mikel Losada
- 2013, Los enamorados, de Carlo Goldoni, Dir. Marco Carniti
- 2013, Terapias, Dir. Rafael Calatayud
- 2012, El hijo del acordeonista, Dir. Fernando Bernues
- 2012, Esencia patria, Dir. Ramón Barea
- 2011, Sekula Bai, Dir. Lander Otaola. Galder Pérez y Mikel Losada
- 2008, Comida para peces, Dir. Fernando Bernues
- 2005, El hombre de los dados, Ramón Barea
- 2004, The Tempest, Ur Teatro. Dir. Helena Pimenta
- 2003, Deseo, Markeliñe.
- 2002, Chincha Rapiña, Txamuskina Teatro. Dir. Eguski Zubia
- 2001, Notas de cocina, Dir. Felipe Loza
- 2000,' Kaioa Eta Katua, Txamuskina Teatro
- 2000, Txamuskina, Teatro Mohicano. Dir: Ramón Barea
- 1999, Alias, Molière, Dir. Ramón Barea
- 1999, Todo Lorca, Cinema Ermua. Dir. Juan Carlos Colina
- 1999, Crímenes ejemplares, de Max Aub. Dir: Itziar Lazkano
- 1999, Solos esta noche, de Paloma Pedrero. Dir: Felipe Loza

== Awards ==
=== Max Awards ===
Year	Category	For work	Result	Ref.
2012	Best Stage Production	Sekila bai! (ex aequo Mikel Losada, Lander Otaola y Galder Pérez)	Nominated	

=== Union of Basque Actors and Actresses Awards ===
Year	Category	For work	Result	Ref.
1999	Best Basque Actor	¿?	Nominated	
2000	Best Basque Actor	¿?	Nominated	
2001	Best Television Actor	¿?	Won	
2022	Best Basque Actor	Ane Is Missing	Nominated	
2022	Best Television Actor	Intimacy	Nominated	

=== Urregin Award ===
Year	Category	For work	Result	Ref.
2021	Best Actor	El viaje a ninguna parte	Won	

== See also ==
- Ramón Barea
