= Zinebi =

Spanish film festival held in Bilbao

Bilbao International Festival of Documentary and Short Film - ZINEBI
- Location: Bilbao, Spain
- Founded: 1959; 67 years ago
- Directors: Joseba Lopezortega Aguirre (current), Ernesto del Río (2000-2017), Vanesa Fernández Guerra (2018-2023)
- Hosted by: Arriaga Theatre
- Website: zinebi.eus/web/en/

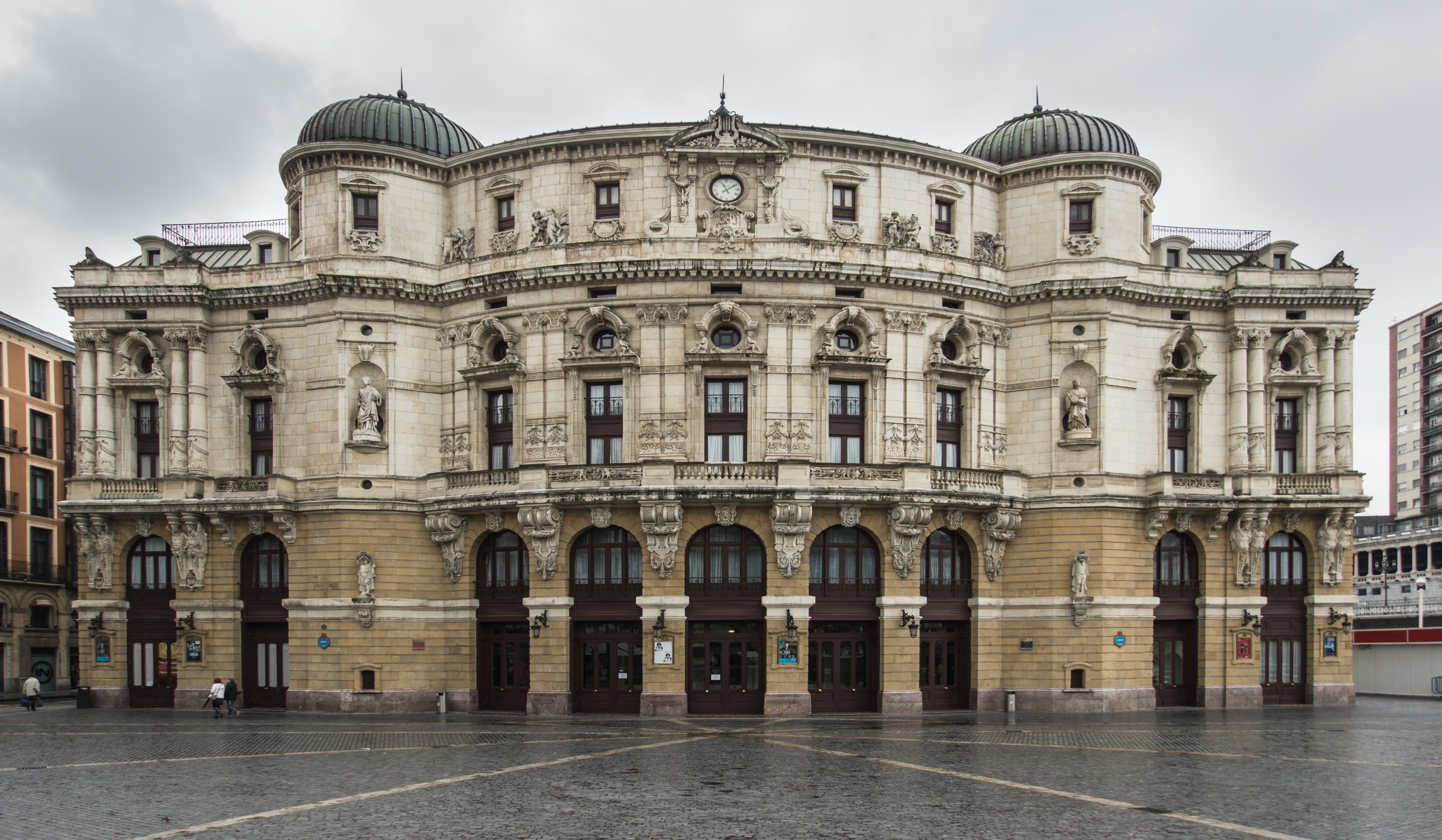
Arriaga Theatre (Bilbao)

The Bilbao International Festival of Documentary and Short Film, ZINEBI, is an international film festival that it is held annually in Bilbao since 1959. It is dedicated to short films including documentaries, fiction and animations.

It is the only Class-A international documentary festival recognised by the International Federation of Film Producers Associations (FIAPF) in Spain.

It has also been accredited by the Academy of Motion Picture Arts and Sciences as a qualifier for the Oscars and also it is a qualifier for the BAFTAs awarded by the British cinema industry and for the Goya Awards awarded by the Academy of Cinematographic Arts and Sciences of Spain.

Organised by the Arriaga Theatre, the festival has currently institutional financing and sponsorship from Bilbao City Council.

== History ==
The festival was established in 1959 by the Basque Institute of Hispanic Culture. The third oldest festival in Spain (after San Sebastian and Valladolid), it was initially dedicated solely to documentary films. In the 1960s the festival expanded its program and included short films and animation. In 1974, Zinebi was appointed A class by the International Federation of Film Producers Associations (FIAPF).

By 2015, annually the management team received more than 5000 titles to review.

Luis Iturri directed the festival in 1989–1999, succeeded by Ernesto del Río (2000–17). In 2017, after 18 years in this post, del Río stepped down as the head of the festival, Vanesa Fernández Guerra was appointed in his place.

In 2020, amidst the COVID-19 pandemic, the festival took place online via the Filmin platform.

In 2023, Vanesa Fernández Guerra stepped down as the head of the festival and was succeeded by Joseba Lopezortega Aguirre.

== Profile ==
=== Sections ===
ZIFF Zinebi International Competition for First Films is the section for feature debuts.

Honorary Mikeldi Awards was established to recognize lifetime career achievements of distinguished international directors.

Beautiful Docs. Panorama of World Documentaries – a non-competitive section, established in 2013, is dedicated to the most relevant contemporary features.

Bertoko Begiradak – Views From the Basque Country – is a section for feature films from a recent production.

The Zinebi Networking industry section was established to encourage emerging creative talents and aid the development of audiovisual productions in the Basque country, it hosts pitching sessions as well as meetings with established filmmakers, masterclasses etc. The industry jury selects two projects in National (launched in 2022) and Basque competitions, both get a €15,000 cash prize.

== Editions ==
=== 2022 ===
The 64th edition of the festival took place 11–18 November 2022. In featured a line-up of more than 147 films from 47 countries, more than half of which made by female directors. Albert Serra and Agnieszka Holland were awarded Honorary Mikeldi prizes. Anhell69 by Theo Montoya won the Zinebi First Film award.

=== 2023 ===
The 65th edition went from 10 to 17 November 2023. Frederick Wiseman, Rita Azevedo Gomes, and Félix Linares were awarded with Honorary Mikeldi prizes. The edition featured a retrospective of Iván Zulueta's films.

=== 2024 ===
The 66th edition of the festival took place on 8–15 November 2024, and featured a line-up of 132 films from 44 countries. The festival hosted 59 Spanish premieres. The main award, Zinebi First Film, went to a Chilean-Argentinian-French feature An Oscillating Shadow by Celeste Rojas Mugica; My Stolen Planet by Farahnaz Sharifi won the ZIFF Youth Jury Prize; Special Jury Mention – Rising Up at Night by Nelson Makengo. The Eggregores’ Theory by Andrea Gatopoulos won the Zinebi Grand Prize in shorts and was selected as Zinebi's candidate for the 2025 European Film Awards.
