= Olatz Ganboa =

Basque film, stage and television actress

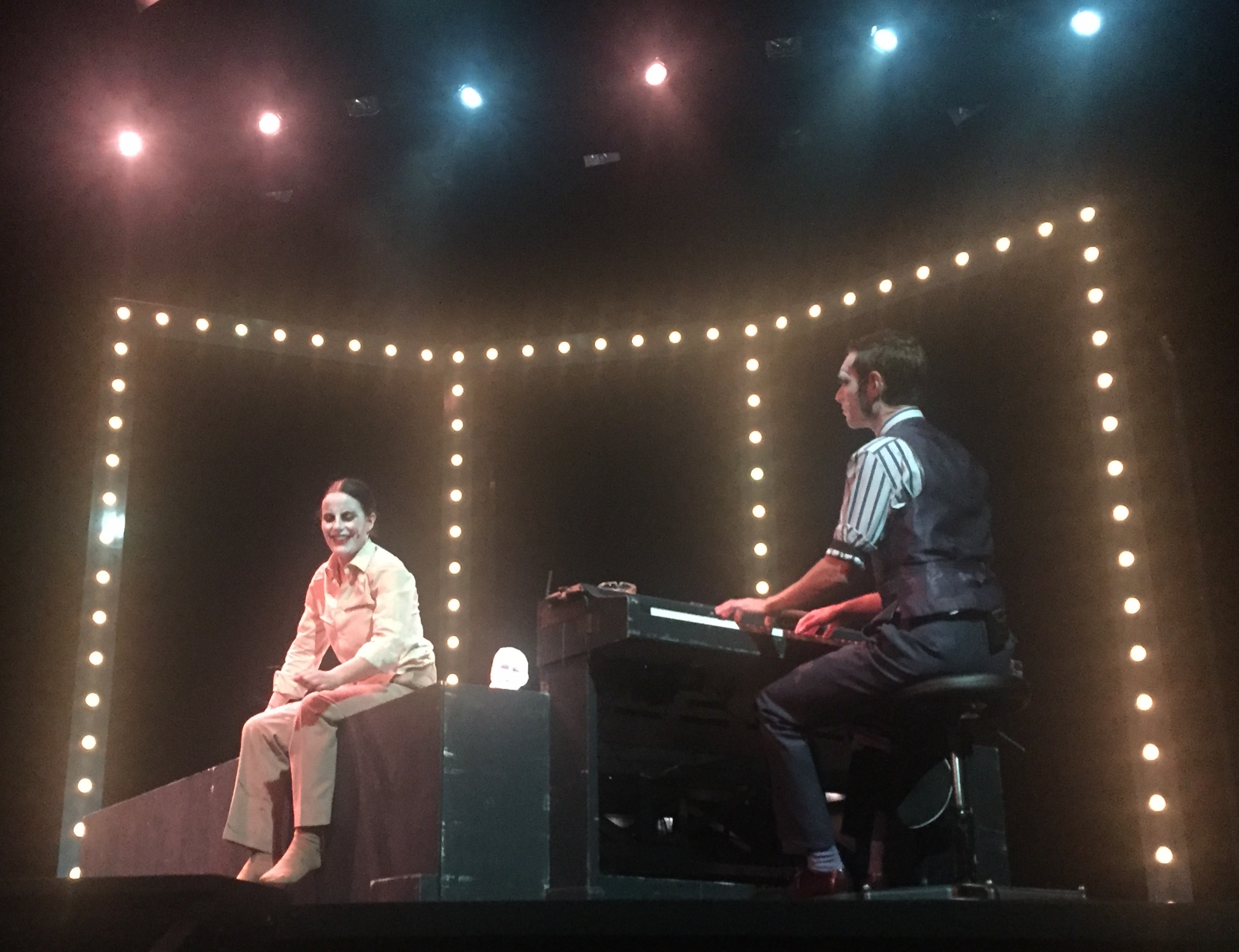
- Olatz Ganboa in 2020
- Born: Olatz Ganboa Pilar; 2 January 1985 (age 41); Getxo (Basque Country); Spain
- Education: University of the Basque Country (Lic.); Getxo Theatre School (BA)
- Occupation: Actress
- Years active: 2011–present
- Spouse: Mikel Losada
- Children: 1
- Father: Jon Ander Gamboa
- Awards: Union of Basque Actors and Actresses Award (2024)

Olatz Ganboa Pilar (born in Getxo on 2 January 1985) is a Basque film, theatre and television actress.

She has worked on several audiovisual productions, films and television series, such as Etxekoak (ETB 1), Itsasoa (ETB 1) or Ángela (Antena 3). She has also worked on multiple stage productions, with acclaimed performances, including ¡Ay Carmela! (2011), La casa de Bernarda Alba (2017), Simplicissimus (2018), Lyceum Club (2019), La lucha por la vida (2023) or Festen (2023), for which she won the Union of Basque Actors and Actresses Award in 2024.

In 2018 she was nominated for Best New Performer at the Ercilla Awards, in 2020 she was nominated for Best Stage Actress at the Union of Basque Actors and Actresses Awards and in 2024 she was a candidate for Best Actress at the Max Awards. In 2024 she won the Award for Best Stage Actress at the Union of Basque Actors and Actresses Awards.

== Life and career ==
Olatz Ganboa was born in Algorta (Getxo, Basque Country) on 2 January 1985. She studied the licenciate degree in journalism in the University of the Basque Country (2003–2008). She then studied the bachelor's degree in Dramatic Art at the Getxo Theatre School (2007–2011). There she met the actors Lander Otaola, Alvar Gordejuela and Alex Ygartua. With the latter he represented ¡Ay, Carmela! for several years.

After that, for 7 years, she took numerous interpretation, dance, and singing courses, both in Spain and in Argentina (Buenos Aires). She began by being part of the hACERIA and Pabellón 6 in Bilbao.

In 2014 she received the Award for Best Leading Actress at the Biescas Theatre Festival (2nd Edition) for her role of Carmela in the play ¡Ay, Carmela!. In 2018 she was nominated for the Ercilla Award for best revelation performer for the plays Lyceum Club and La casa de Bernarda Alba. During the years 2018 and 2020 he represented the work Simplicissimus, directed by Patxo Tellería.

In 2019 they won the Ercilla Award for Best Basque Production 2019 for the play ¡Ay, Carmela!. In 2020 she was nominated for Best Stage Actress at the Union of Basque Actors and Actresses Awards (Besarkada Awards) for the work ¡Ay, Carmela!.

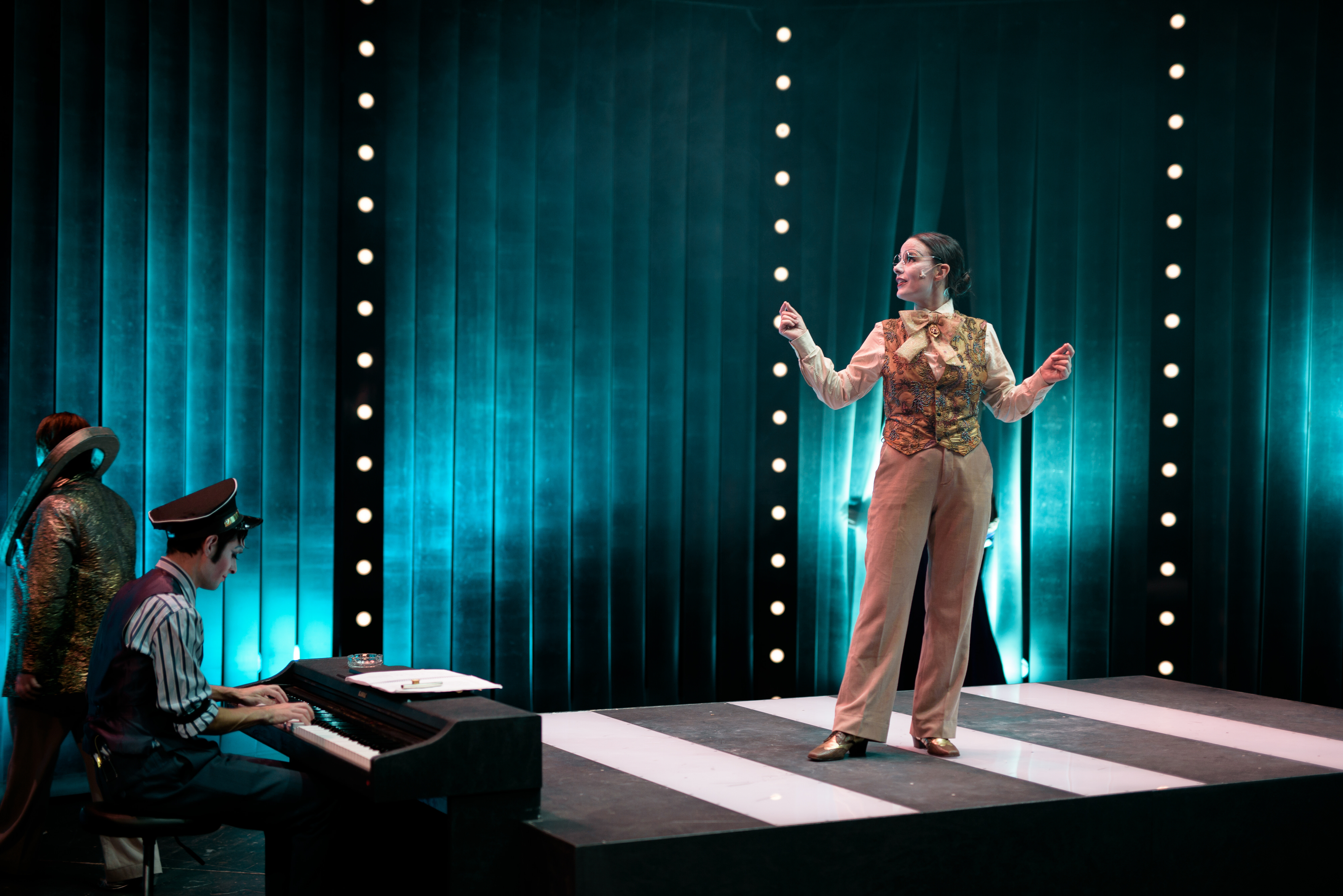
Ganboa in the stage production Simplicissimus, directed by Patxo Telleria.

In 2021 she was one of the presenters of the Max Awards. In 2023, she was part of the cast of the original production of the Teatro Arriaga La lucha por la vida, a play based on the works by Pío Baroja and directed by Ramón Barea.

In 2023, she performed the play ¿Do you let me give him the bottle? (¿Me dejas darle el biberón?), together with his father Jon Ander Gamboa, written by Patxo Tellería and co-directed by Patxo Tellería and Mikel Losada. The stage production was awarded the Álex Angulo Award (2023) conferred by Pabellón Nº 6 and the Bilbao City Council and also received the Audience Award (2023).

In 2023 she performed the play Festen, a stage production of the Arriaga Theatre, directed by María Goiricelaya, about sexual abuse within the family. In 2024 she was a candidate for Best Actress at the Max Awards for her performance in the stage production Festen. That same year she won the Award for Best Stage Actress at the Union of Basque Actors and Actresses Awards (EAB) for her performance in the production Festen, which was praised and described as "shocking".

In 2024 Ganboa was awarded the Performing Arts Award for her professional career, in the 13th Edition of the AixeGetxo! Awards, awarded by the Getxo City Council.

In 2025, she joined the cast of the play Who Shot Us?, a stage production of the Arriaga Theatre, directed by Ramón Barea, 2013 National Theatre Award, a play about uprooting and disappointment, based on real events, about an immigrant family from Romania.

== Private life ==
She currently lives in Bilbao. She is in a relationship with actor Mikel Losada. In 2016 he and Ganboa represented Los amantes del Casco Viejo, a theatre production of the Arriaga Theatre. They also recorded the series Etxekoak together, on ETB 1, in full confinement due to the COVID pandemic in 2020.

Her father is Jon Ander Gamboa, lawyer and sports executive, former General Secretary of the Basque Football Federation between 1993 and 2014.

== Filmography ==
=== Film ===
- 2021, Carnívoro (Meat), dir. Lander Castro
- 2017, Ziren, dir. Aitzol Saratxaga
- 2016, We Are Pregnant, dir. Juana Macías
- 2013, Tres mentiras, dir. Ana Murugarren

=== Television ===
- 2024, Ángela, Antena 3 (Rocío)
- 2023, Itsasoa, ETB 1
- 2020, Etxekoak, ETB 1
- 2018, Objetivo Bizkaia, Tele 7 (guest/interviewed)
- 2010, Kerman, ETB 1

=== Stage ===
- 2025, Who Shot Us?, dir. Ramón Barea
- 2023, Festen, dir. María Goiricelaya
- 2023, Do you let me give him the bottle?, dir. Patxo Tellería and Mikel Losada
- La lucha por la vida (2023), dir. Ramon Barea
- 2019, Lyceum Club, dir. María Goiricelaya
- Simplicissimus (2018–2020)
- La casa de Bernarda Alba (2017)
- A Midsummer Night's Dream (2016)
- Los amantes del Casco Viejo (2016)
- Caperucita Feroz (2015)
- Chichinabo Cabaret (2015)
- Cabaret Chihuahua (2015)
- ¡Ay Carmela! (2011–2023)
- La comedia sin título (2010)

== Awards ==
=== Max Awards ===
Year	Category	For work	Result	Ref.
2024	Best Actress	Festen	Nominated	

=== Ercilla Awards ===
Year	Category	For work(s)	Result	Ref.
2018	Best New Performer	Lyceum Club and La casa de Bernarda Alba	Nominated	
2019	Best Basque Stage Production	¡Ay, Carmela!	Won	

=== Union of Basque Actors and Actresses Awards ===
Year	Category	For work	Result	Ref.
2020	Best Stage Actress	¡Ay, Carmela!	Nominated	
2024	Best Stage Actress	Festen	Won	

=== Short Theatre Awards ===
Year	Category	For work	Result	Ref.
2023	Álex Angulo Award	Do you let me give him the bottle?	Won	
2023	Audience Award	Do you let me give him the bottle?	Won	

=== Other awards and recognitions ===
- 2024, Performing Arts Award, for the professional career, in the AixeGetxo! Awards (13th Edition)
- 2014, Award for Best Leading Actress, for ¡Ay, Carmela!, at the Biescas Theatre Festival (2nd Edition)

== See also ==
- Ramón Barea
