= Hidden Away (2014 film) =

2014 film by Mikel Rueda

- Theatrical release poster
- Spanish: A escondidas
- Directed by: Mikel Rueda
- Written by: Mikel Rueda
- Produced by: Eduardo Barinaga; Fernando Díez; Karmelo Vivanco
- Starring: Germán Alcarazu; Adil Koukouh; Joseba Ugalde; Eder Pastor; Moussa Echarif; Mansour Zakhnini
- Cinematography: Kenneth Oribe
- Edited by: Alex Argoitia; Mikel Rueda
- Production companies: Baleuko; Bitart New Media
- Distributed by: Vértigo Films
- Release dates: 22 March 2014 (Málaga Film Festival); 10 October 2014 (Spain)
- Running time: 96 minutes
- Country: Spain
- Languages: Spanish; Arabic

Hidden Away (Spanish: A escondidas) is a 2014 Spanish romantic drama film written and directed by Mikel Rueda. Filmed in neighbourhoods throughout Bilbao, Rueda's goal was to create a scene that could be from any neighbourhood in any city. Rueda dedicated the project to Álex Angulo, a Basque actor who died in a car crash in July 2014. Themes that are present throughout the film are adolescent first love, sociocultural dilemmas, racism and deportation, and connecting emotionally through some of these barriers.

== Plot ==
In Bilbao, 14-year-old middle-class student Rafa feels alienated and uncomfortable when his friends discuss girls, as he is secretly not attracted to them. To his dismay, the group—particularly his best friend Guille—is insistent on pairing him with Marta, a schoolmate. Rafa becomes annoyed when Javi, the group's confrontational leader, shares his phone number with Marta without his permission, prompting her to begin texting him.

At a water polo training session, Rafa becomes interested in a boy around his age and follows him to a nearby rooftop. The boy, Ibra, is a Moroccan migrant who left his family behind and now resides in a juvenile reception center. Although Ibra is initially wary of Rafa, the two gradually build trust by sharing a cigarette and practicing throwing stones at a target.

One night, Rafa and Ibra visit the same club with their respective groups of friends. Peer pressure forces Rafa to awkwardly kiss Marta, after which he retreats to the bathroom with Ibra to compose himself. When they return, a fight has broken out between their groups over a girl. Once the situation deescalates, Rafa decides to leave and return home. Later that night, Ibra and the other residents of the reception center are awakened by police attempting to detain his friend Said. Ibra and a caretaker are briefly imprisoned after trying to intervene.

Rafa begins spending more time with Ibra, while gradually distancing himself from Guille, who grows increasingly concerned, and continuing to reject Marta's advances. Watching the sunset at the beach, Ibra gives Rafa a friendship amulet. One afternoon, while waiting for Ibra, Rafa unexpectedly encounters his friends, who confront him over rumors that he has been spending time with a Moroccan boy. Ibra, who arrives unnoticed and overhears the conversation, is hurt when Rafa denies the rumors by assuring them that he would never befriend a Moor. After spending the afternoon with them, Rafa searches for Ibra, only to learn that he has left the reception center out of fear of being deported to Morocco, like Said, for confronting the police.

Unbeknownst to Rafa, Ibra is attempting to hitchhike through the countryside. When it begins to rain, he takes shelter at a gas station, where he is caught attempting to steal food. As the storekeepers prepare to call the police, Youssef, another migrant, intervenes on Ibra's behalf and pays for the food. Ibra is then allowed to stay in Youssef's dilapidated apartment, which he shares with other undocumented migrants and a child with a severe disability, whom he cares for. At one point, Ibra unknowingly assists Youssef in stealing from a pharmacy, after which Youssef informs him that he will be required to sell drugs.

Rafa reunites with Ibra, who confronts him about his earlier remarks to his peers. Rafa apologizes and invites him to the rented room where he often spends time with his group. There, they begin playing and just as they are becoming intimate, Guille, Javi and the rest of the group enter unexpectedly, reacting in disbelief with racist and homophobic comments. After confronting them, Rafa and Ibra leave and visit a fair, where an angered Youssef begins chasing them as Ibra has stolen from him. After evading Youssef, Rafa tends Ibra's injured knee in his home, and the two share a kiss.

Although they visit Ibra's reception center, they leave upon learning that the police are coming to deport him. On the way, they encounter Guille, who apologizes for his earlier remarks and gives them all the saved money he has. Rafa and Guille hug tearfully and say goodbye. Passing the night at a train station, they help Youssef and his child evade the police, for which Youssef begrudgingly forgives Ibra and explains that their apartment has been seized by the police.

They opt to board a train leaving for France, but only Youssef and his child get in, as Rafa trips and Ibra stops to help him. Ibra once again evades the police by hiding beneath a truck, returning to a life on the run. In class, a teary-eyed Rafa lovingly holds Ibra's amulet.

== Cast ==
- Germán Alcarazu as Rafa
- Adil Koukouh as Ibra
- Joseba Ugalde as Guille
- Moussa Echarif as Youssef
- Ana Wagener as Alicia
- Álex Angulo as Jose
- Eder Pastor as Javi
- Mansour Zakhnini as Said
- Khalid Chiyar as Rashid
- Garazi Navarro as Marta
- Ramón Agirre as Rafa's father
- Itziar Lazkano as Rafa's mother
- Sara Cozar as Elisa
- Reyes Moleres as pharmacist
- Elena Irureta as María
- Justi Larrinaga as customer
- Hamdi Kousairy as Mohamed
- Oier Tariku Cano as Youssef's brother
- Aitor Beltrán and Iratxe Hernández as teachers
- Juan Manuel Rodríguez as police
- Jon Gómez and Mikel Somiñana as trainers
- Oier Astorizka and Gorka Cabreras as bathroom boys
- Adrián Mata, Gontzal Lobato, Ismael Ruiz, Liviu George, Oier Trevilla and Garikoitz Uribesalgo as Rafa's friends
- Salmane Fana, Jamal Addoui, Youssef Ait, Nabil Assan, Mustapha El Jadydy and Abderraman Otane as Ibra's friends
- Mohamed Khouyaoui, Asian Ben Said, Mohamed Said, Ayoub Debhi, Mobarel Ouamou and Youssef Bel Hadi as Youssef's group
- Alejandra Navarro, Yasmina Dos Santos, Zuriñe Lopez and Verónica Pedrueza as Marta's friends
- Joel Vázquez, Asier Robles, Jorge Pelaz, Iñigo Meca, Egoi Sas, Ibai Zaitegui, Imanol Torres, Garikoitz Manchado and Patxo Telleria as water polo players
- Emilian Dandu as classmate
- Alberto Castro, Beñat López and Xabi Fernández as referees
- Javi Alaiza as unnamed man

== Themes ==
Hidden Away tackles tough themes throughout the course of the film that include, but are not limited to the following: racism, homosexuality, homophobia, identity, social influences and adolescent love. In the film, Ibra is seen dealing with various racial prejudice encounters. This can be seen with Ibra's interactions with Rafa's friend group on multiple occasions, some being said straight to his face and others behind his back. An example of one of these interactions can be seen when Rafa's friends including Javi, catch him waiting for Ibra. They begin to ask Rafa where he has been since he has been spending most of his time with Ibra as opposed to his friends, to which Rafa responds by saying he has been helping his family. Guille begins to put pressure on and inquire if Rafa likes men, more specifically Ibra. To this, Rafa responds with frustration and states how he would never be with an Arab, much less an Arab man. This was just one of many instances in the film in which Ibra faced racism. However for Adil Koukouh, when it came to dealing with racism as a part of the role, it was easier for him than others given his background.

Not only is racism a big theme that runs through, but social influences and homophobia are as well. Most of the scenes in which this can be seen in the film are when Rafa and his friend group are on screen. One character in specific in which the effect of social influences can be seen is Guille. At the start of the film he is introduced as Rafa's best friend and as time goes on we see how his interactions with Rafa change. In the film, there is a scene where Rafa and Ibra are sharing a moment and Rafa's friends, Guille, Javi, and more, come in. Javi starts to make homophobic comments and looks to Guille for backup as he does so, which Guille provides. The audience is led to believe that Guille has chosen to side with Javi and continues to make comments on Rafa and Ibra. However, later in the film, when Rafa and Ibra show up at Guille's house about to run away, Guille's demeanor changes. In this moment that Rafa and Guille share, despite the last encounter between the two, the audience is shown the same compassionate side that comes with Guille's character.

== Release ==
Hidden Away was first released at the Málaga Film Festival on March 22, 2014. It was then released in Spain on October 10, 2014. Shortly after, in that same month, TLA Releasing bought distribution rights for the United States of America which as a result of overseas success in countries such as France and Germany.

== Production ==
Rueda wanted to center the idea of adolescence and homosexuality in the discussion around Hidden Away. In his own words, he felt that most areas of society feel uncomfortable talking about the sexuality of teenagers. One of interesting aspects of his casting is that he did not want to limit the actors to identifying as gay themselves. His logic behind this process was that, by limiting who could audition, the turnout would be lower and he might not find the actors that he was looking for.

Rueda found that the relationship between Moroccan and queer adolescence had parallel realities that he attempted to explore in the creation of this film. He felt that the way that Spain treats both demographics pushed them to live a escondidas or "hidden away". Rueda contests that Spain lives in a bubble where anyone who challenges that normativity threatens to pop that bubble, creating fear in the normative community. Therefore, some people must live hidden away within, or outside that bubble.

== Awards ==
Although Hidden Away did not win any awards, it was nominated six times. It was also presented at the first LGTBI Life Festival at La Institución Ferial Alicantina (IFA).

- 2nd Feroz Awards: Best Poster (Priscila Clementti).
- Nuremberg International Human Rights Film Festival: Nuremberg International Human Rights Film Award (Mikel Rueda).
- Queer Lisboa: Best Feature Film (Mikel Rueda)
- 24th Actors and Actresses Union Awards: Film: Performance in a Minor Role, Female (Ana Wagener)
- Málaga Spanish Film Festival: Golden Biznaga: Best Film
- 30th edition Torino Gay & Lesbian Film Festival: Queer Award
