= Ernesto del Río =

Spanish film director

Ernesto del Río Villagrá
- Born: 1958 (age 67–68)
- Education: University of Deusto
- Occupations: Film director, screenwriter
- Years active: 1974–present

Ernesto del Río Villagrá (b. 1958) is a Basque film director and director of the Zinebi, the Bilbao Documentary and Short Film Festival.

== Biography ==
Del Río graduated with a degree in law from the University of Deusto and received an official position in Bilbao City Hall. In 1974, he founded the Cineclub de Deusto, a circle of cinema lovers hosted in the Santiago Apostle Cinema. In 1982, he released his directorial debut, a short film titled Octubre, 12. After several more projects, in 1985 he founded his production company Sendeja Films.

In 2000-17, del Río has been the director of ZINEBI Bilbao Documentary Film Festival. He stepped in as the director after the demise of Luis Iturri, however, his collaboration with the festival started as early as in the 1970s. Del Río retired from his post in 2017, succeeded by Vanesa Fernández Guerra.

In 2006-17, he has headed the Bilbao Bizkaia Film Commission, an initiative created to promote and facilitate audiovisual productions around Bilbao.

His 2024 feature That world that gives you nothing was selected for the San Sebastian film festival.

== Filmography ==
=== Director ===
- 2024: That world that gives you nothing;
- 2012: Umezurtzak;
- 2011: Valeria descalza;
- 1995: Hotel y domicilio;
- 1992: No me compliques la vida;
- 1987: El amor de ahora (feature debut);
- 1983: El ojo de la tormenta (short);
- 1982: Octubre, 12 (short).

=== Producer ===
- 2009: Tosferina (short, dir. Álvaro Alonso);
- 2005: Hoja de Ruta (short, dir. Jose A. Pérez);
- 1998: Entre todas las mujeres (dir. Juan Ortuoste);
- 1996: Calor y celos (dir. Javier Rebollo);
