= Belén Gopegui =

Spanish writer (born 1963)

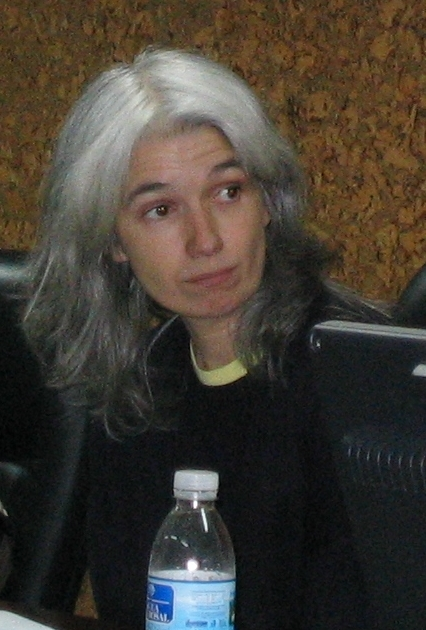
- Gopegui in a summer course in Cáceres, Spain, July 2007
- Born: 1963 (age 62–63); Madrid, Spain
- Occupation: novelist
- Years active: 1993–present

Belén Ruiz de Gopegui Durán (born 1963, in Madrid) is a Spanish novelist and screenwriter.

== Biography ==
Gopegui is a Spanish novelist and essayist who has been hailed by contemporary critics as an unmissable and highly influential voice in Spanish literature. She graduated in Law from the Autonomous University of Madrid, where she directed the magazine Trasgo, and gained a doctorate in Humanities from the Carlos III University. She began her professional career collaborating in the literary sections of various media, including the newspaper El Sol, for which she conducted interviews. She is also a student and practitioner of the Commons at Escuela Popular de Prosperidad. You can often find Gopegui's work in independent and free-access media like Rebelion.org.

She is the daughter of Margarita Durán Suárez, one of the founders of Amnesty International in Spain, and the aerospace scientist Luis Ruiz de Gopegui, one of the few Spanish astrophysics experts of his generation outside of exile.

She began her professional writing career as a contributor of interviews and book reviews to the literary sections of diverse media outlets. In 1993 she published La escala de los mapas, which won two prizes for debut novels: el Premio Tigre Juan and el Premio Iberoamericano Santiago del Nuevo Extremo. Two years later, her book La conquista del aire was adapted into a film titled Las razones de mis amigos, directed by Gerardo Herrero and with a screenplay written by Ángeles González-Sinde and Gopegui herself. She went on to write screenplays for La suerte dormida and El principio de Arquímedes. Lo real was a finalist for three prizes: Premio de la Crítica 2001, Premio Fundación José Manuel Lara de Novela 2002, and XIII Premio Rómulo Gallegos 2003. Her novel Deseo de ser punk won the Dulce Chacón prize in 2010. From 2011 to 2017 she published three novels that explore the relationship between systems of interconnectedness through the internet and individuals' capacity for action: Acceso no autorizado, El comité de la noche, and Quédate este día y esta noche conmigo. Her talk Ella pisó la luna. Ellas pisaron la luna, delivered in March 2019, is a tribute to all women whose achievements have not yet come to light. In 2021 she published another novel, Existiríamos el mar.

Belén Gopegui is also the author of numerous children's stories including El balonazo, El amigo que surgió de un viejo ordenador, and Mi misión era acercarme a Miranda.

As an essayist she is well known for her works Un pistolezato en medio de un concierto and Rompiendo algo (UDP).

== Bibliography ==
- La escala de los mapas. Anagrama, 1993
  - Premio Tigre Juan 1993
  - Premio Iberoamericano "Santiago del Nuevo Extremo" 1994
- Tocarnos la cara. Anagrama, 1995
- Cualladó: puntos de vista, 1995
- En desierta playa, 1995
- La conquista del aire. Anagrama, 1998
- Lo real. Anagrama, 2001
  - Finalista del XIII Premio Rómulo Gallegos 2003
  - Finalista del I Premio Fundación José Manuel Lara de Novela 2002
  - Finalista del Premio de la Crítica 2001
- El lado frío de la almohada. El Cultural 2003
- con González-Sinde, Ángeles. La suerte dormida, 2003 (script).
- El principio de Arquímedes, 2004 (script).
- El lado frío de la almohada. Anagrama, 2004
- El padre de Blancanieves. Anagrama, 2007
- El Balonazo. Anagrama, 2008
- Deseo de ser punk. Anagrama, 2009
- The Scale of Maps, published by City Lights Books, 1 April 2011. ISBN 9780872865105.
- Acceso no autorizado. Mondadori, 2011
- El comité de la noche. Penguin Random House, 2014
- Fuera de la burbuja, Gran Angular, 2017
- Quédate este día y esta noche conmigo Penguin Random House, 2017
- Las nubesfuria, Somos libros, 2021
- Existiríamos el mar, Random House 2021
- Stay This Day and Night with Me, published by City Lights Books. 3 July 2023. ISBN 9780872868939.
- El murullo. La autoayuda como novela, un caso de confabulación (Debate, 2023) ISBN 978-84-19399-27-4
- Te siguen (Random House, 2025) ISBN 9788439744719
