= Mikel Rueda =

Spanish film director

Mikel Rueda Sasieta
- Born: 6 July 1980 (age 45); Bilbao, Spain
- Occupations: Filmmaker, writer
- Known for: Hidden Away
- Website: mikelrueda.com

Mikel Rueda Sasieta (born 6 July 1980) is a Spanish film director and screenwriter.

He is a graduate in audiovisual communication with a specialty in script from the University of Navarra. He worked as a producer in Euskal Telebista (EITB) for four years and, after working on several short films, he received a scholarship to study at the New York Film Academy, where he did his post-graduate work in Film Direction.

== Career ==
Mikel Rueda made his film debut as both a director and a writer in 2007 with the release of his short film, Presente Perfecto. His first feature length film, Izarren argia was released in 2010 at the San Sebastian International Film Festival. He filmed his first full length documentary, Quinta Plata, in New York in 2016.

Many of his films and short films contain themes of the gay and queer community as he believes there is still a lot for the community to claim.

He has directed films in English, Spanish, and Basque.

== Filmography ==
- Presente Perfecto (2007)
- Cuando Corres (2010)
- Stars to Wish Upon (2010)
- Agua! (2012)
- Hidden Away (2014)
- Nueva York. Quinta planta (2016)
- The Double Plus Fifteen (2019)
- Veneno (2020)
- Vestidas de azul (2023)
- The Gardener (2025)

== Awards and nominations ==
| Year | Festival | Category | Film | Outcome |
|---|---|---|---|---|
| 2014 | Nuremberg International Human Rights Film Festival | Nuremberg International Human Rights Film Award | A escondidas | Nominated |
| 2015 | Queer Lisboa – Lisbon Gay & Lesbian Film Festival | Jury Prize | A escondidas | Nominated |
| 2016 | San Sebastian International Film Festival | Best Basque Screenplay | Nueva York. Quinta planta | Won |
