= Lehendakaritza =

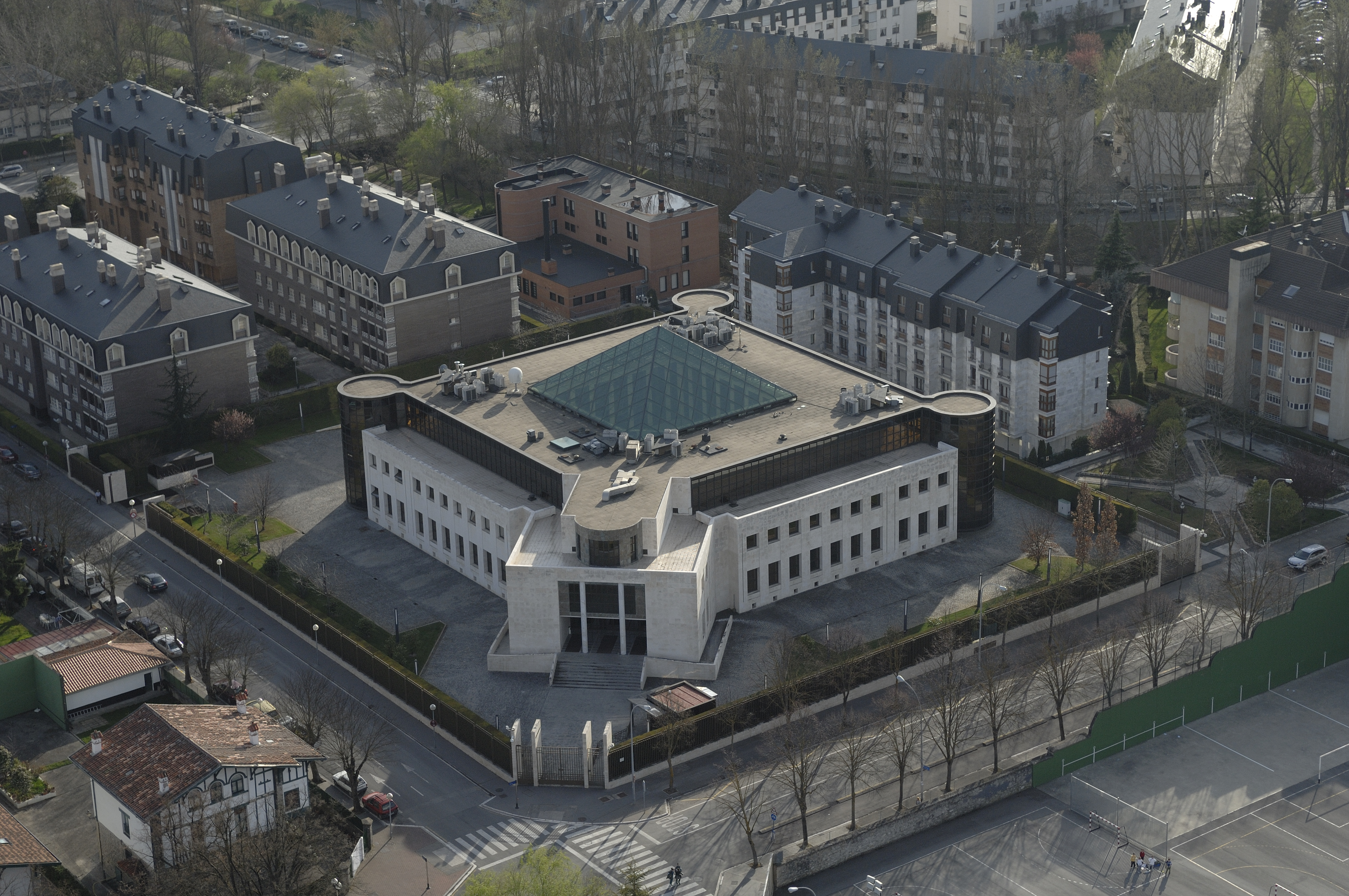
Seat of Lehendakaritza in Vitoria-Gasteiz.

Lehendakaritza or the President's Office is the department of the Basque Government responsible for the affairs of the lehendakari and issues like communication, open government, foreign affairs and peace. This department is led by the President.

The seat of the President's Office is in Vitoria-Gasteiz, near the official residence of the lehendakari, Ajuria Enea.

== Structure ==
- President of the Government
  - Secretary-General of the President's Office
  - Secretary-General of Foreign Action
  - Secretary-General for Peace and Coexistance
