= Imanol Uribe =

Spanish screenwriter and film director (born 1950)

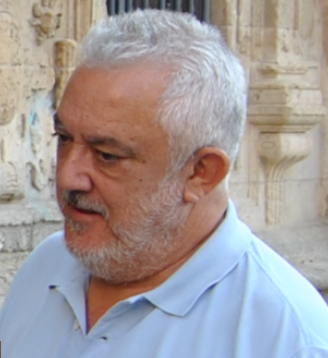
- Born: 28 February 1950 (age 75); San Salvador, El Salvador
- Occupations: Film director; screenwriter

Imanol Uribe (born 28 February 1950) is a Basque Spanish screenwriter and film director. He won the Goya Award for Best Director and Best Screenplay for the 1994 thriller Running Out of Time.

== Biography ==
Born in San Salvador on 28 February 1950 to parents from Biscay, Uribe was raised since age 7 in Biscay. After earning a licentiate degree in journalism, he joined the Escuela Oficial de Cine, leaving the latter with a reputation as a politically combative filmmaker. From 1982 to 2004, he was married to María Barranco, whom with he has had one child in common. He has won the Goya Award for Best Director for Días contados as well as the San Sebastian Film Festival's Golden Shell for Bwana.

== Filmography ==
- El proceso de Burgos (1979)
- La fuga de Segovia (1981)
- La Muerte de Mikel (1983)
- Eternal Fire (1985)
- Adiós pequeña (1986)
- La luna negra (1990)
- El rey pasmado (1991)
- Días contados (1994)
- Bwana (1996)
- Extraños (1998)
- Plenilunio (1999)
- El viaje de Carol (2002)
- Miel de naranjas (2012)
- Llegaron de noche (2022)
- La sospecha de Sofía (2025)
