= Ramón Barea =

Spanish actor

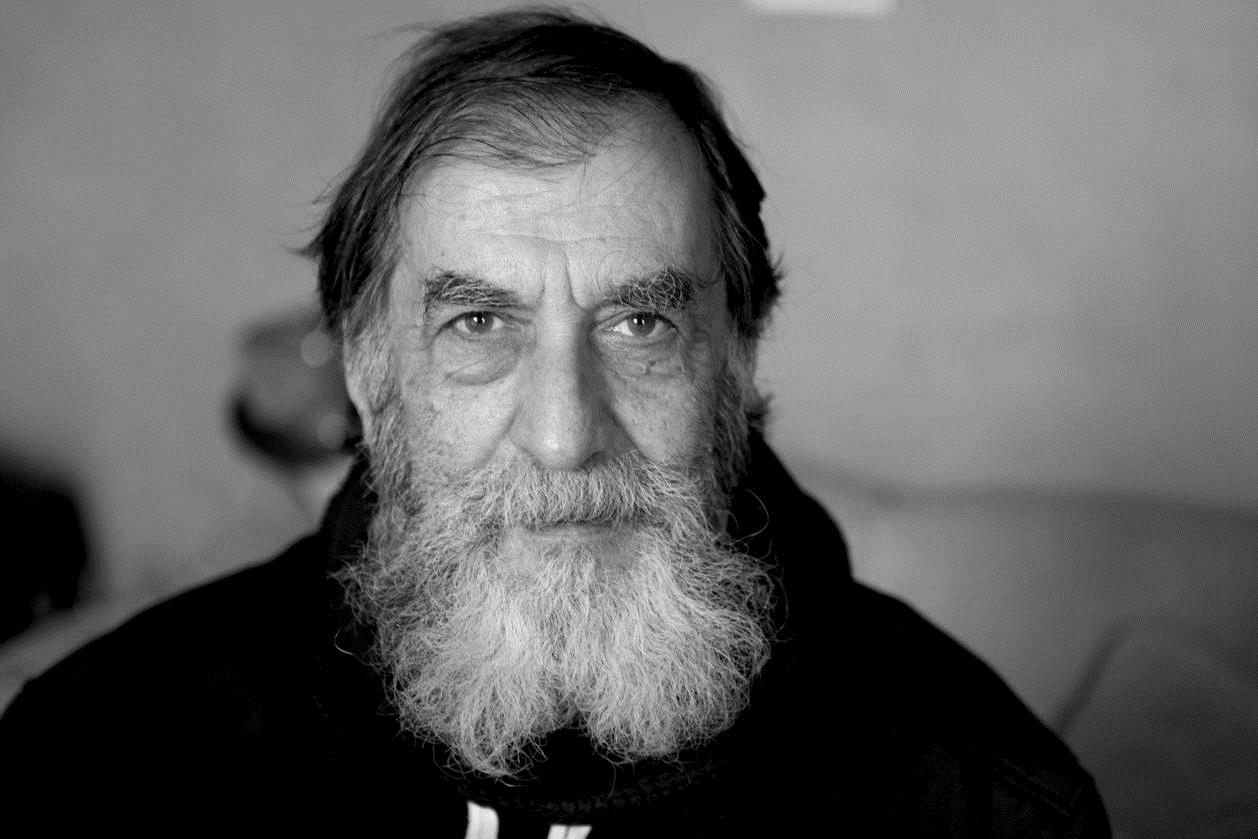
- Born: José Ramón Barea Monge; 13 July 1949 (age 77); Bilbao, Spain
- Other name: Ramon Barea
- Occupation: Actor
- Years active: 1981–present

José Ramón Barea Monge (born 13 July 1949), known as Ramón Barea, is a Spanish actor.

== Biography ==
José Ramón Barea Monge was born in Bilbao on 13 July 1949. Barea made his feature film debut in the 1981 film Escape from Segovia.

== Selected filmography ==
Year	Title	Role	Notes	Ref.
1981	La fuga de Segovia (Escape from Segovia)		Feature film debut	
1985	Eternal Fire			
1991	Todo por la pasta (Anything for Bread)	Aniceto		
1993	La madre muerta (The Dead Mother)	Dueño del bar		
1994	Justino, asesino de la tercera edad (Justino, a Senior Citizen Killer)	Inspector Arsenio		
1997	El ángel de la guarda	Subt. Cárdenas		
1997	La buena estrella (Lucky Star)	Paco		
1997	En brazos de la mujer madura (In Praise of Older Women)	Peciña		
1997	A ciegas (Blinded)	Clemente		
1998	Una pareja perfecta (A Perfect Couple)	Melecio		
1998	Atilano, presidente (Atilano for President)	Ortega		
1999	Cuando vuelvas a mi lado (By My Side Again)	Donato		
1999	Las huellas borradas (Fading Memories)	Zayas		
2002	The Other Side of the Bed			
2007	Seven Billiard Tables			
2013	Blancanieves			
2013	Wounded			
2014	Negociador (Negotiator)	Manu Aranguren		
2016	La reina de España			
2017	La higuera de los bastardos (The Bastards' Fig Tree)	Don Eulogio		
2018	Todos lo saben (Everybody Knows)	Antonio		
2019	La pequeña Suiza	Antolín		
2019	Twin Murders: The Silence of the White City	Abuelo		
2020	Voces (Don't Listen)	Germán		
2022	Cinco lobitos (Lullaby)	Koldo		
2022	Edén	Félix		
2026	La luz (The Light)	Padre Luis		
2027	Blanco			
