= List of Spanish films of 1991 =

A list of Spanish-produced and co-produced feature films released in the country in 1991. The domestic theatrical release date is favoured.

== Films ==
Release		Title (Domestic title)	Cast & Crew	Ref.
J A N U A R Y	24	The Most Natural Thing (Lo más natural)	Director: Josefina Molina Cast: Charo López, Miguel Bosé, Patrick Bauchau, Viviane Vives	
A P R I L	5	How to Be a Woman and Not Die in the Attempt (Cómo ser mujer y no morir en el intento)	Director: Ana Belén Cast: Carmen Maura, Antonio Resines	
A P R I L	12	Lovers (Amantes)	Director: Vicente Aranda Cast: Victoria Abril, Maribel Verdú, Jorge Sanz	
A P R I L	12	Capità Escalaborns	Director: Carlos Benpar Cast: Juan Luis Galiardo, Ariadna Gil, Gunnel Lindblom, Carmen Elías	
M A Y	24	Barcelona, lament	Director: Luis Aller Cast: Luis Fernando Alvés, Maru Valdivielso, Pep Munné, Ariadna Gil, Eulàlia Ramon, Manuel de Blas	
M A Y	31	El amor sí tiene cura	Director: Javier Aguirre Cast: Fernando Esteso, Esperanza Roy	
A U G U S T	9	Anything for Bread (Todo por la pasta)	Director: Enrique Urbizu Cast: Kiti Manver, María Barranco, José Antonio Rodríguez, Ion Gabella, Antonio Resines, Pedro Díez del Corral, José Amezola, Pilar Bardem, Ramón Barea, Maite Blasco, Luis Ciges, Saturnino García, Pepo Oliva, Klara Badiola, Juan Carlos Senante	
S E P T E M B E R		Don Juan in Hell (Don Juan en los infiernos)	Director: Gonzalo Suárez Cast: Fernando Guillén, Charo López, Mario Pardo (actor), Héctor Alterio	
O C T O B E R	4	The Longest Night (La noche más larga)	Director: José Luis García Sánchez Cast: Carmen Conesa, Juan Echanove, Juan Diego, Gabino Diego, Fernando Guillén Cuervo	
O C T O B E R	18	Butterfly Wings (Alas de Mariposa)	Director: Juanma Bajo Ulloa Cast: Laura Vaquero, Silvia Munt, Fernando Valverde, Txema Blasco, Susana García	
O C T O B E R	18	Chatarra	Director: Félix Rotaeta Cast: Carmen Maura, Mario Gas, Rosario Flores	
O C T O B E R	25	High Heels (Tacones lejanos)	Director: Pedro Almodóvar Cast: Victoria Abril, Marisa Paredes, Miguel Bosé	
N O V E M B E R	1	The Dumbfounded King (El rey pasmado)	Director: Imanol Uribe Cast: Gabino Diego, Eusebio Poncela, Juan Diego, María Barranco, Laura del Sol	
N O V E M B E R	29	Catorce estaciones	Director: Antonio Giménez-Rico Cast: Géraldine Danon, Juan Luis Galiardo, Jacques Penot, Mónica Randall, Santiago Ramos, Joaquín Hinojosa	
D E C E M B E R	13	Prince of Shadows (Beltenebros)	Director: Pilar Miró Cast: Terence Stamp, Patsy Kensit, José Luis Gómez	
D E C E M B E R	20	El robobo de la jojoya	Director: Álvaro Sáenz de Heredia Cast: Josema Yuste, Millán Salcedo (Martes y Trece), Anabel Alonso	

== See also ==
- 6th Goya Awards
