= Los pazos de Ulloa (TV series) =

Spanish–Italian television series (1985)

- Genre: Historical drama
- Based on: The House of Ulloa and La madre naturaleza by Emilia Pardo Bazán
- Screenplay by: Manuel Gutiérrez Aragón; Gonzalo Suárez; Carmen Rico Godoy
- Directed by: Gonzalo Suárez
- Composer: Juan José García Caffi
- Countries of origin: Spain, Italy
- Original language: Spanish
- No. of seasons: 1
- No. of episodes: 4

Production
- Producer: Andrés Vicente Gómez
- Cinematography: Carlos Suárez
- Editor: Eduardo Biurrun
- Running time: 240 min.
- Production companies: Televisión Española; Radiotelevisione italiana
- Budget: 250 million ₧

Original release
- Network: La Primera
- Release: 9 December – 30 December 1985

Los pazos de Ulloa is a Spanish–Italian prime-time television series based on the 1886 novel of the same name and its 1887 sequel La madre naturaleza by Emilia Pardo Bazán. Produced by Midega Film and Cía. Iberoamericana de T.V. for Televisión Española (TVE) and Radiotelevisione italiana (RAI), it was directed by Gonzalo Suárez, with a screenplay by himself, Manuel Gutiérrez Aragón and Carmen Rico Godoy. Its four episodes adapting the novels were broadcast on La Primera of Televisión Española in 1985.

== Plot ==
Galicia, 1880. Don Julián, a priest who has been sent as administrator of the Marquis' estate, arrives at the Pazos de Ulloa, a remote and wild place. Don Pedro, Marquis of Ulloa, an impoverished and corrupt feudal lord, is impeded from marrying Nucha, a young lady from the city, his cousin, for whom the hostile and cruel environment of the pazos will constitute a hellish nightmare. Sabel, with whom the Marquis has had a illegitimate son, is in stark contrast to the fragile Nucha.

== Production ==
The series was directed by Gonzalo Suárez, with screenplay by himself, Manuel Gutiérrez Aragón and Carmen Rico Godoy. The exteriors were filmed on location in Santiago de Compostela, El Espinar, Gondomar, Puenteareas, and Tuy for five months. The interiors were filmed at the Luis Buñuel studios in Madrid, where 6,000 square metres (65,000 sq ft) of sets were built. It was produced with a budget of 250 million pesetas (€1.5 million).

== Cast ==
- José Luis Gómez as Don Julián
- Omero Antonutti as Don Pedro, Marquis of Ulloa
- Victoria Abril as Nucha / Manolita
- Charo López as Sabel
- Fernando Rey as Mr. de la Lage
- Pastora Vega as Rita

== Accolades ==
=== Seminci ===
Los pazos de Ulloa was chosen television series of the year by the Valladolid International Film Festival in 1986. The four episodes were screened in their film version during the thirty-first edition of the festival.

=== Banff World Television Festival ===
TVE presented Los pazos de Ulloa at the 1986 Banff World Television Festival, where it received a special prize from the jury.

=== TP de Oro ===
Year	Category	Recipient	Result	Ref.
1985	Best Spanish Series		Won	
1985	Best Actor	Fernando Rey	2nd Place	
1985	Best Actor	José Luis Gómez	3rd place	
1985	Best Actress	Charo López	Won	
1985	Best Actress	Victoria Abril	2nd Place	

=== Fotogramas de Plata ===
Year	Category	Recipient	Result	Ref.
1985	Best Television Performer	José Luis Gómez	Nominated	
1985	Best Television Performer	Victoria Abril	Nominated	
