= 6th Goya Awards =

- Date: 7 March 1992
- Site: Palacio de Congresos de Madrid
- Hosted by: Aitana Sánchez-Gijón and José Coronado

Highlights
- Best Film: Lovers
- Best Actor: Fernando Guillén; Don Juan in Hell
- Best Actress: Sílvia Munt; Butterfly Wings
- Most awards: The Dumbfounded King (8)
- Most nominations: The Dumbfounded King (14)

Television coverage
- Network: TVE

The 6th Goya Awards ceremony, presented by the Academy of Cinematographic Arts and Sciences of Spain, took place in Madrid on 7 March 1992.

Lovers won the award for Best Film.

== Winners and nominees ==
The winners and nominees are listed as follows:

Best Film: Lovers; Don Juan in Hell; The Dumbfounded King	Best Director: Vicente Aranda – Lovers; Pilar Miró – Prince of Shadows; Imanol Uribe – The Dumbfounded King
Best Actor: Fernando Guillén – Don Juan in Hell; Gabino Diego – The Dumbfounded King; Jorge Sanz – Lovers	Best Actress: Sílvia Munt – Butterfly Wings; Victoria Abril – Lovers; Maribel Verdú – Lovers
Best Supporting Actor: Juan Diego – The Dumbfounded King; José Luis Gómez – Prince of Shadows; Javier Gurruchaga – The Dumbfounded King	Best Supporting Actress: Kiti Manver – Anything for Bread; María Barranco – The Dumbfounded King; Cristina Marcos – High Heels
Best Original Screenplay: Eduardo Bajo Ulloa, Juanma Bajo Ulloa – Butterfly Wings; Luis Marías – Anything for Bread; Álvaro del Amo, Vicente Aranda, Carlos Pérez Merinero – Lovers	Best Adapted Screenplay: Joan Potau, Gonzalo Torrente Malvido – The Dumbfounded King; Carmen Rico-Godoy – How to Be a Woman and Not Die in the Attempt; Mario Camus, Pilar Miró, Juan Antonio Porto – Prince of Shadows
Best New Director: Juanma Bajo Ulloa – Butterfly Wings; Ana Belén – How to Be a Woman and Not Die in the Attempt; Manuel Gómez Pereira – Pink Sauce	Best Spanish Language Foreign Film: The Frontier • Chile; Hello Hemingway • Cuba; Jericho • Venezuela; Dueling Techniques: A Matter of Honor • Colombia
Best Cinematography: Javier Aguirresarobe – Prince of Shadows; Carlos Suárez – Don Juan in Hell; Hans Burmann – The Dumbfounded King	Best Editing: José Luis Matesanz – Prince of Shadows; José Salcedo – High Heels; Teresa Font – Lovers
Best Art Direction: Félix Murcia – The Dumbfounded King; Wolfgang Burmann – Don Juan in Hell; Fernando Sáenz, Luis Vallés – Prince of Shadows	Best Production Supervision: Andrés Santana – The Dumbfounded King; Alejandro Vázquez – Don Juan in Hell; José L. García Arrojo – Prince of Shadows
Best Sound: Gilles Ortion, Ricard Casals – The Dumbfounded King; Carlos Faruolo, Manuel Cora, Alberto Herena – Prince of Shadows; Jean-Paul Mugel – High Heels	Best Special Effects: Reyes Abades – Prince of Shadows; Kit West – Anything for Bread; Carlo De Marchis – Capità Escalaborns
Best Costume Design: Javier Artiñano – The Dumbfounded King; Yvonne Blake – Don Juan in Hell; José María Cossío – High Heels	Best Makeup and Hairstyles: Romana González, Josefa Morales – The Dumbfounded King; Jesús Moncusi, Gregorio Ros – High Heels; Juan Pedro Hernández – Prince of Shadows
Best Original Score: José Nieto – The Dumbfounded King; Bernardo Bonezzi – Anything for Bread; Alejandro Massó – Don Juan in Hell	Best Short Film: La viuda negra; Eduardo; La doncella virtuosa; Ni contigo ni sin ti

== Honorary Goya ==
- Emiliano Piedra
