= The House of Ulloa =

1886 novel by Emilia Pardo Bazán

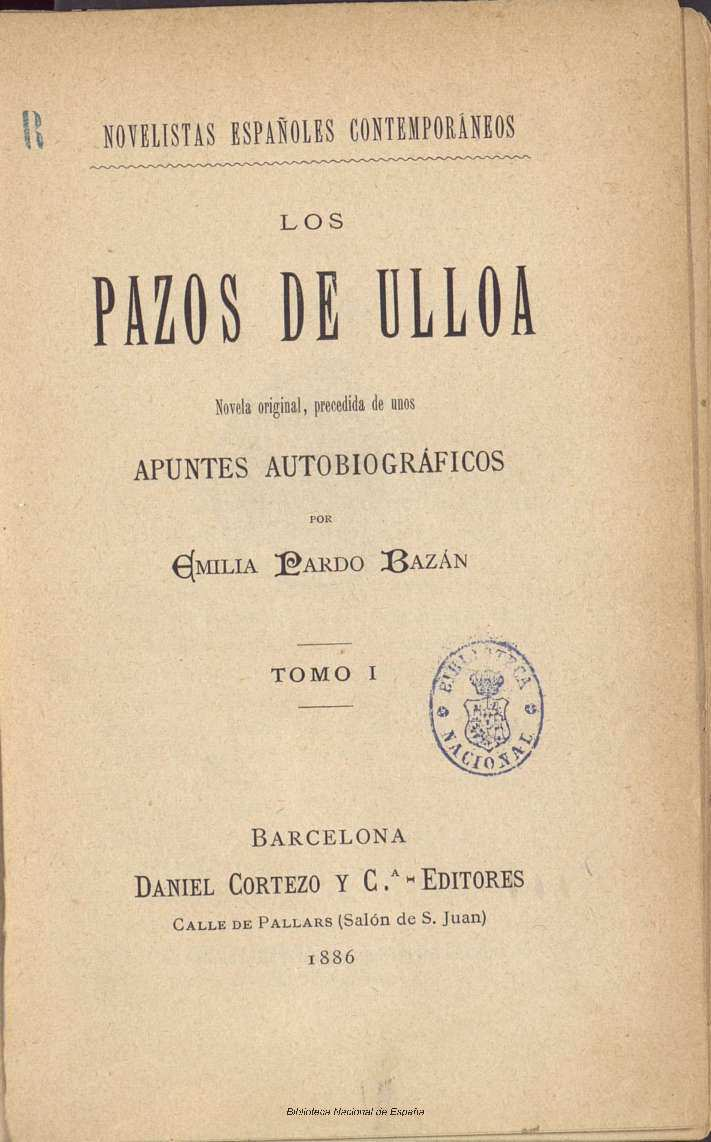
- Cover of first edition
- Author: Emilia Pardo Bazán
- Audio read by: Isabel Naveira (Spanish)
- Original title: Los pazos de Ulloa
- Translator: Paul O'Prey and Lucia Graves
- Language: Spanish
- Genre: Novel; Tragicomedy; Naturalism; Realism
- Set in: Rural Galicia, mid- to late 19th century
- Published: 1886
- Publisher: Penguin Books (U.K. first edition)
- Publication place: Spain
- English publication date: 1990
- Media type: Print: hardback
- Pages: 275 (U.K. first edition)
- ISBN: 9780140445022
- Dewey Decimal: 863.5
- LC Class: PQ6629.A7 P3
- Followed by: La madre naturaleza
- Original text: Los pazos de Ulloa at Spanish Wikisource

The House of Ulloa (Spanish: Los pazos de Ulloa, lit. 'The pazos of A Ulloa') is a novel by Emilia Pardo Bazán, published in Spanish in 1886, and translated into English by Paul O'Prey and Lucia Graves, published by Penguin Classics in 1990. It was republished by Pocket Penguins in 2016. The story continues in the 1887 novel La madre naturaleza.

== Plot synopsis ==
The story is set in rural Galicia, in the mid- to late 19th century. The main character is Julián Álvarez, a meek, dainty and profoundly religious priest who has been assigned as chaplain to the estate of the marquis of Ulloa, the arrogant Pedro Moscoso. The marquis' house is almost in ruins, but Don Pedro cares only to go hunting and leaves the day-to-day running of the estate to his majordomo, the sly Primitivo. Julián is shocked that a nobleman would allow a roguish character such as he to manage his affairs, and is even more perturbed to find that Primitivo's beautiful daughter Sabel is the mother of Don Pedro's illegitimate son, Perucho.

As he lives on the Ulloa estate and tries to sort out the long-neglected affairs of the marquis, Julián becomes more and more disillusioned with his role. He is unable to get rid of Primitivo and Sabel; the house is constantly inhabited by scoundrels and vagabonds; and by failing to act he feels he is officially sanctioning the marquis' illegitimate union with Sabel.

Eventually, Don Pedro violently beats Sabel after she dances with another man at a feast, but doesn't banish her from the house. The marquis reveals to Julián that he is afraid of Primitivo, who is the real master of the estate through his connections with the peasants and his ruthless methods. Through Sabel, Don Pedro is also controlled by Primitivo. Julián convinces the marquis to change his life and travel to the city to find a wife.

Don Pedro and Julián travel to Santiago, where they are hosted by the marquis' uncle, who is also Julián's patron. The uncle has four daughters, and Don Pedro resolves to marry one of them. He is initially attracted to the buxom and provocative Rita, who returns his advances, but after a heart-to-heart conversation with Julián he proposes to Marcelina, nicknamed Nucha, a much more meek and modest girl. Nucha reluctantly accepts, causing a rift with the rest of her family and her sisters. They get married and return to the Ulloa estate in the countryside.

Nucha soon becomes pregnant, and, much to Don Pedro's dismay, gives birth to a girl. He grows apart from his wife and starts sleeping again with Sabel. Without her family and estranged from her husband, Nucha dedicates herself wholly to her newborn daughter, with only Julián to give her company. Her mental and physical state deteriorates after she starts to suspect that the boy Perucho is Don Pedro's illegitimate son. Julián also becomes more and more distraught; he notices signs of physical abuse in Nucha and blames himself for having brought this woman, whom he considers saintly and without error, to a remote estate surrounded by people who don't deserve her.

Don Pedro stands as a candidate in the provincial election, but even though Primitivo uses all of his wiles and resources to have his master elected, the marquis is defeated. Privately, the local political leaders believe Primitivo to have betrayed them. Don Pedro becomes furious at the election loss and Nucha, who had hoped that they could move to Madrid if he had been elected, realises that there is nothing more for her at the dilapidated estate.

Nucha asks Julián to help her escape back to her father; as they conspire, Primitivo informs Don Pedro of their whereabouts and reinforces a rumor that they might be having an affair. Don Pedro confronts the two with great violence, but as he does so Primitivo is shot dead as retaliation for the electoral loss. Upon seeing Don Pedro threaten to beat his wife, Julián finally stands up for himself and leaves the estate for good. He is assigned to a mountain parish where he works with great abnegation for ten years, and eventually receives a notice that Nucha has died.

In the epilogue, Julián returns to the Ulloa estate to pay his respects to his former mistress. There, he encounters Nucha's daughter and Perucho, now both grown up and handsome. The story continues in La madre naturaleza.

== Adaptation ==
Televisión Española (TVE), in co-production with Radiotelevisione italiana (RAI), adapted the novel and its sequel to the television series Los pazos de Ulloa, directed by Gonzalo Suárez, and premiered in 1985.
