= Benito Pocino =

Spanish actor (born 1958)

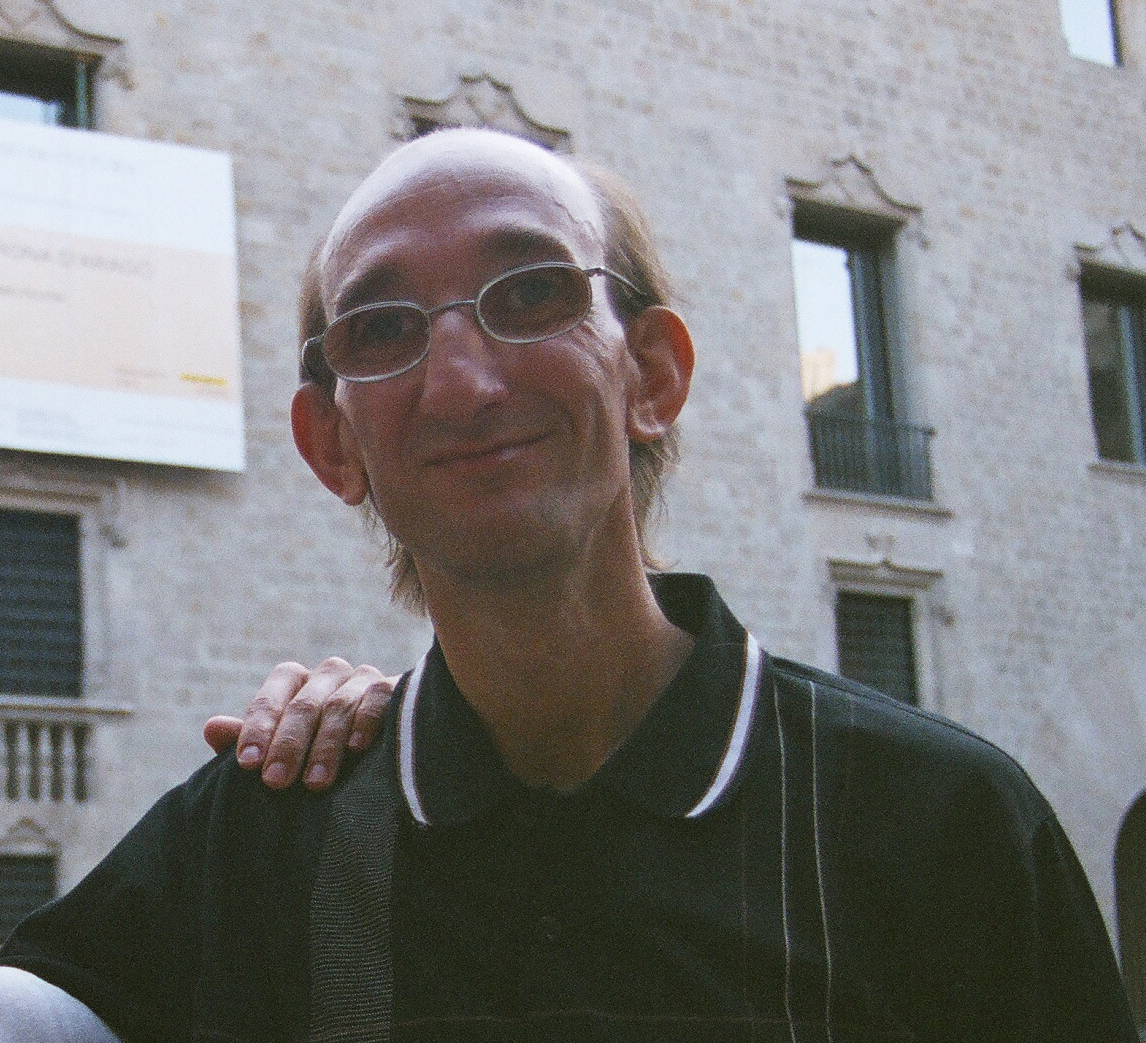
- Benito Pocino in the summer of 2006
- Born: 21 March 1958 (age 67); Barcelona
- Occupation: Actor

Benito Pocino (born 21 March 1958), is a former Spanish actor.

Benito Pocino was born in Barcelona on 21 March 1958. He used to read Mortadelo y Filemón comics, and his classmates gave him the nickname Mortadelo due to his appearance. He works as mailman in Correos.

He is known for playing Mortadelo in La gran aventura de Mortadelo y Filemón (2003). He was replaced by Edu Soto in the sequel Mortadelo y Filemón. Misión: salvar la Tierra (2008), and by Karra Elejalde in Mortadelo y Filemón contra Jimmy el Cachondo (2014). He appeared in Rumores (2007) with Xavi Mira, Núria Prims and Ana Risueño.

== Filmography ==
- El sulfato anatómico (2016)
- Chaval, videoclip de La señora de González
- No es un concepto nuevo, videoclip de Soulfood
- Déjate caer (2007)
- Rumores (2007)
- La máquina de bailar (2006)
- Platillos volantes (2003)
- La gran aventura de Mortadelo y Filemón (2003)
- Feliz aniversario (1998)
- El viatger (1998)
- Adiós, tiburón (1996)
- El caso de los falsos doctores (1996)
- Atolladero (1995)
- Don Jaume, el conquistador (1994)
- Historias de la puta mili (1994)
- Makinavaja (1994) (TV series)
- Semos peligrosos (uséase Makinavaja 2) (1993)
- Makinavaja, el último choriso (1992)
- Sinatra (1988)
- Angustia (1987)
