= Ana Álvarez =

Spanish actress and model (born 1969)

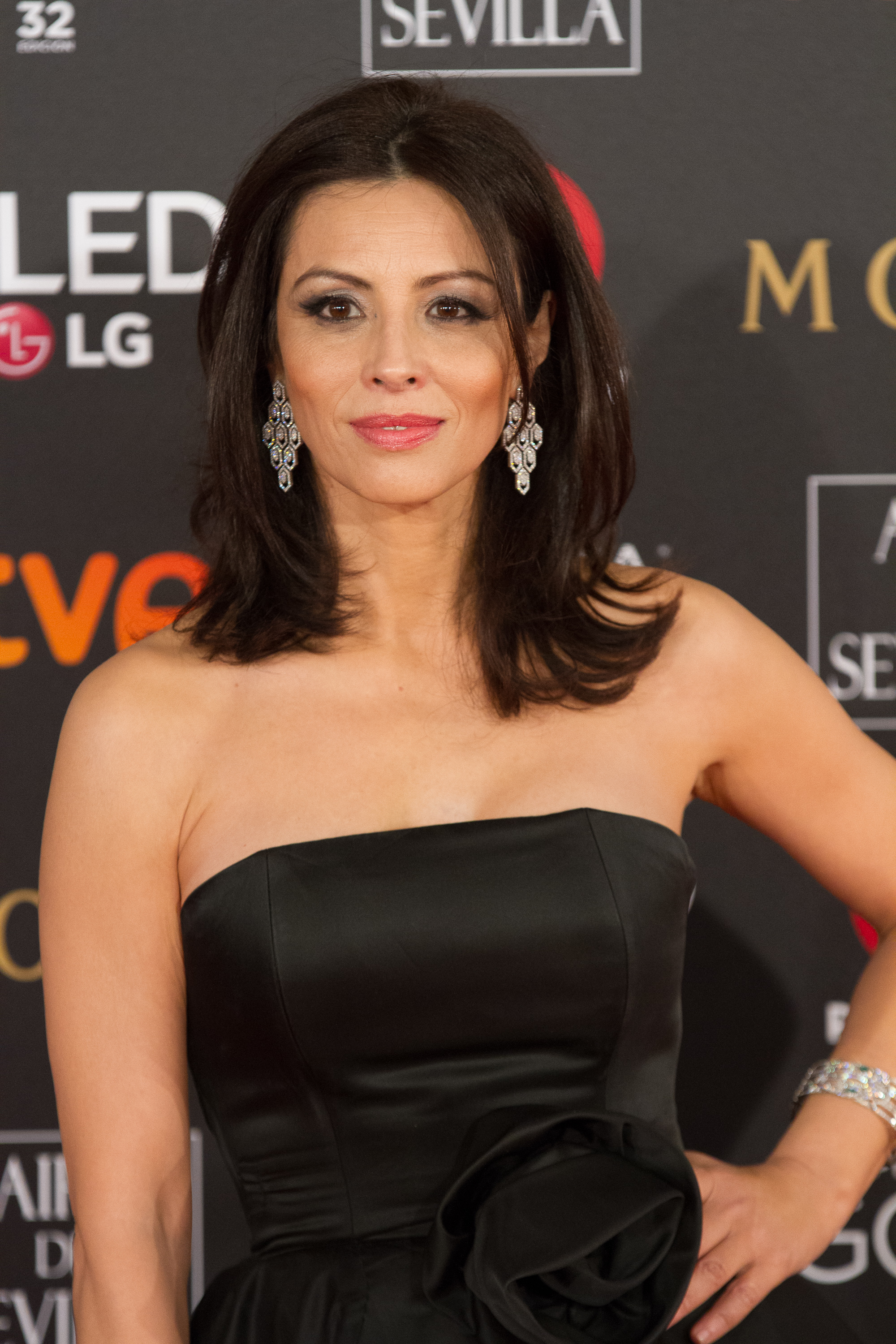
- At the 32nd Goya Awards in 2018
- Born: Ana Teresa Álvarez Páez; 19 November 1969 (age 56); Jerez de la Frontera, Spain
- Occupations: Actress; model
- Height: 5 ft 7 in (1.70 m)

Ana Teresa Álvarez Páez (born November 19, 1969) is a Spanish actress and a model.

== Early life ==
Ana Teresa Álvarez Páez was born in Jerez de la Frontera, province of Cádiz, on November 19, 1969. She moved to Madrid when she was about 13 years old, and then moved to Japan at age 17 to work as a model.

== Career ==
She debuted in a small part in Antonio Giménez-Rico's 1988 film Jarrapellejos. She studied acting at Madrid's Escuela de Arte Dramático.

In 1989, she was featured in the Spanish comedy Aquí huele a muerto.

The same year, Alvarez participated in Sólo o en compañía de otros, from Santiago San Miguel.

At the end of 1990, she took part in the Televisión Española production film Don Juan en los infiernos, a free adaptation by Gonzalo Suárez of Molière's Don Juan.

After a number of minor film credits, her performance in Juanma Bajo Ulloa's 1993 film The Dead Mother consolidated her career.

In spring 1994, Ana worked with director Ricardo Franco in the comedy ¡"Oh, Cielos"! with Jesús Bonilla, el Gran Wyoming and Ángela Molina.

In 1995, she appeared in the Hispanic-German production Vivir al límite with film director Michael Gutmman, and later that same year Brujas came out, which starred Penélope Cruz and Beatriz Carvajal.

She appeared in Cha, cha, chá (1998) with Eduardo Noriega and Jorge Sanz, A galope tendido (2000), and Las amargas lágrimas de Petra von Kant (2001).

== Filmography ==
=== 2000s ===
- Prime Time (2008) ...Mónica
- "Quart" (2007) TV series
- Joaquín Sabina - ...y seguido 1992-2005 (2006) (V) vídeo - 'Por el boulevard de los sueños rotos'
- GAL (2006) Soledad Muñoz
- Límites naturales (2006) Miranda
- Sinfín (2005) Laura
- Crusader (2004) (TV) Veronica
- Bolsa, La (2003) Mujer Movil
- "London Street" Ajo (4 episodes)
- La boda (TV episode) Ajo
- Love Story (TV episode) Ajo
- Moder' no hay más que 'guan (2003) (TV episode) Ajo
- Yo 'zoy' 'ingléz' (TV episode) Ajo
- Mirada, La Ana
- Amargas lágrimas de Petra von Kant, Las (2001) (TV) Karin
- A galope tendido Doro a.k.a. At Full Gallop

=== 1990s ===
- Dulce olor a muerte, Un (1999) Gabriela, aka A Sweet Scent of Death (USA)
- Cosas nuestras (1999) Paula
- Mátame mucho (1998) Julia, aka Kill Me Over and Over (USA)
- Cha-cha-chá (1998) Lucia
- Dile a Laura que la quiero (1995) Laura
- King of the River (1995) aka I Get Off at the Next Stop, What About You?
- Don Juan en los infiernos (1991) Chiquilla India, aka Don Juan in Hell
- Solo o en compañía de otros (1991) Virginia Medina Uztueta
- Aquí huele a muerto...(¡pues yo no he sido!) (1990) (as Ana Alvarez) Nicole Darquier
- Tesoro, El (1990) Marga

=== 1980s ===
- Soldadito español (1988)
- Jarrapellejos (1988) Petra
- Elegía (1987)

== See also ==
- Ines Sastre
- Sonia Ferrer
- Natalia Estrada
- Almudena Fernandez
