= The Dead Mother =

- Theatrical release poster
- Spanish: La madre muerta
- Directed by: Juanma Bajo Ulloa
- Screenplay by: Juanma Bajo Ulloa; Eduardo Bajo Ulloa
- Starring: Karra Elejalde; Ana Álvarez; Lio; Silvia Marsó
- Cinematography: Javier Aguirresarobe
- Edited by: Pablo Blanco
- Music by: Bingen Mendizábal
- Production company: Gasteizko Zinema
- Release dates: September 1993 (Venice); 5 November 1993 (Spain)
- Country: Spain
- Language: Spanish

The Dead Mother (Spanish: La madre muerta) is a 1993 Spanish drama film directed by Juanma Bajo Ulloa which stars Karra Elejalde and Ana Álvarez alongside Lio and Silvia Marsó. Together with Bajo Ulloa's debut feature Butterfly Wings (1991), it contributed to the creation of an aura of cult auteur around the director.

== Plot ==
A girl, Leire, ends up as mentally impaired after being shot in the head in a domestic rob attempt by Ismael, who also kills Leire's mother (a restorer of religious images). The plot primarily concerns the ambiguous relationship between Ismael and Leire, after Ismael kidnaps Leire years later.

== Cast ==
- Karra Elejalde as Ismael López de Matako
- Ana Álvarez as Leire
- Lio as Maite
- Silvia Marsó as Blanca
- Elena Irureta as directora
- Ramón Barea as dueño del bar
- Gregoria Mangas as Sra. Millas
- Marisol Saes as Madre
- Raquel Santamaría as Leire niña

== Production ==
The film is a Gasteizko Zinema production. It was primarily shot in Vitoria-Gasteiz.

== Release ==
The film was presented at the 50th Venice International Film Festival's 'Venetian Nights' section in September 1993, later screening at the Montreal Film Festival. It was theatrically released in Spain on 5 November 1993.

== Reception ==
Ángel Fernández-Santos of El País deemed the film to have a lower quality than it appears to display at first glance, writing that "it holds up as an exercise in the mechanics of violence by a very skilled director, but it lacks a system for embodying that violence in believable human beings", dragged by bad writing and poor dialogues.

== Accolades ==
Year	Award	Category	Nominee(s)	Result	Ref.
1993	Montreal Film Festival	Best Director	Juanma Bajo Ulloa	Won	
1994	8th Goya Awards	Best Director	Juanma Bajo Ulloa	Nominated	
1994	8th Goya Awards	Best Cinematography	Javier Aguirresarobe	Nominated	
1994	8th Goya Awards	Best Editing	Pablo Blanco	Nominated	
1994	8th Goya Awards	Best Special Effects	Hipólito Cantero	Won	

== See also ==
- List of Spanish films of 1993
