= Makinavaja =

Makinavaja may refer to:

- Makinavaja (comic strip)
- Makinavaja (TV series), a Spanish comedy TV series, based on the comic
- Makinavaja, el último choriso, a 1992 Spanish crime comedy film
