= The Longest Night (1991 film) =

- Theatrical release poster
- Spanish: La noche más larga
- Directed by: José Luis García Sánchez
- Screenplay by: Carmen Rico Godoy; Manuel Gutiérrez Aragón; José Luis García Sánchez
- Based on: El año que murió Franco by Pedro J. Ramírez
- Produced by: Andrés Vicente Gómez
- Starring: Carmen Conesa; Juan Echanove; Juan Diego; Fernando Guillén Cuervo; Gabino Diego
- Cinematography: Fernando Arribas
- Edited by: Pablo G. del Amo
- Music by: Alejandro Massó
- Production company: Iberoamericana Films
- Distributed by: United International Pictures
- Release dates: 23 September 1991 (Zinemaldia); 4 October 1991 (Spain)
- Country: Spain
- Language: Spanish

The Longest Night (Spanish: La noche más larga) is a 1991 Spanish historical drama film directed by José Luis García Sánchez which stars Juan Echanove alongside Carmen Conesa and Juan Diego. Written by García Sánchez alongside Carmen Rico Godoy and Manuel Gutiérrez Aragón, the screenplay is based on the story El año que murió Franco by Pedro J. Ramírez. The movie deals with the social amnesia that fell upon Franco's regime times once democracy was restored in Spain. The title comes from a line of Al Alba, a song by Luis Eduardo Aute and popular during the waning days of Franco's government.

== Plot ==
The plot concerns about the last executions carried out by the Francoist regime on 27 September 1975. In a night during 1990, both the military prosecutor of the trial and one of the defense attorneys meet on a train, recalling memories of the final months of Francoist Spain and the political transition that followed, as well as of their personal lives.

== Cast ==
- Carmen Conesa as Gloria
- Juan Echanove as Juan
- Juan Diego as Prosecutor Menéndez
- Gabino Diego as Fito
- Fernando Guillén Cuervo

== Production ==
Based on the book by Pedro J. Ramírez, the screenplay was penned by Carmen Rico Godoy, Manuel Gutiérrez Aragón, and José Luis García Sánchez. The film was produced by Andrés Vicente Gómez's Iberoamericana Films. Shooting locations included Casa Mingo in Madrid.

== Release ==
The film screened in competition at the 39th San Sebastián International Film Festival on 23 September 1991. Distributed by United International Pictures, the film was released theatrically in Spain on 4 October 1991.

== Reception ==
The film was met with chilliness by the critics, most acrimoniously by the Basque ones. Casimiro Torreiro of El País questioned the choices of silencing that two ETA members were facing the same plight as those detainees in the fiction, with the film also concealing the names of the organizations to which the depicted anti-fascists belonged to (the FRAP).

== See also ==
- List of Spanish films of 1991
