= Epilogue (1984 film) =

- Spanish: Epílogo
- Directed by: Gonzalo Suárez
- Screenplay by: Gonzalo Suárez; M. Ángel Barbero; Juan Potau
- Based on: Gorila en Hollywood and Rocabruno bate a Ditirambo by Gonzalo Suárez
- Starring: José Sacristán; Francisco Rabal; Charo López; Sandra Toral
- Cinematography: Carlos Suárez
- Edited by: Eduardo Biurrun
- Music by: Juan José García Caffi
- Production companies: Ditirambo Films; La Salamandra PC
- Distributed by: José Esteban Alenda
- Release date: 20 January 1984
- Country: Spain
- Language: Spanish

Epilogue (Spanish: Epílogo) is a 1984 drama film written and directed by Gonzalo Suárez. It stars José Sacristán, Francisco Rabal, and Charo López.

== Plot ==
The plot concerns two writers (Rocabruno and Ditirambo) who wrote together, signing their works under a shared pseudonym (Rocabruno Ditirambo) and were infatuated for the same woman, their muse Laína. It is arranged around three layers of fiction: a conversation between Laína and a student of literature, past events involving Laína, Rocabruno, and Ditirambo in Madrid and Asturias, and another one pertaining the tales involving the characters.

== Cast ==
- Charo López as Laína
- Francisco Rabal as Rocabruno
- José Sacristán as Ditirambo
- Sandra Toral as Ana
- Sonia Martínez
- Manuel Zarzo
- Martín Adjemián
- Chus Lampreave

== Production ==
Adapted from Gonzalo Suárez's novels Gorila en Hollywood and Rocabruno bate a Ditirambo, the screenplay was written by Suárez alongside Miguel Ángel Barbero and Juan Potau. Epilogue is a Ditirambo Films and La Salamandra PC production. The film received a 27.5 million ₧ funding tranche from TVE. It was shot in Asturias.

== Release ==
Distributed by José Esteban Alenda S.A., Epilogue was released theatrically in Spain on 20 January 1984. It also entered the Directors' Fortnight section of the 37th Cannes Film Festival in May 1984.

== See also ==
- List of Spanish films of 1984

== Bibliography ==
- Hernández Ruiz, Javier (2001). "Epílogo (1984) (Gonzalo Suárez, 1984): Literatura y cine en el "Apocalipsis Posmoderno"" (PDF). MIFLC Review. 10. Mountain Interstate Foreign Language Conference. ISSN 1079-7866.
- Marsh, Steven (2018). "Primal Events. The Early Films of Gonzálo Suárez". Revista de Estudios Hispánicos. 52 (2). Washington University in St. Louis: 305–326. doi:10.1353/rvs.2018.0038. ISSN 0034-818X.
