= Don Juan in Hell (film) =

1991 film

- Theatrical release poster
- Spanish: Don Juan en los infiernos
- Directed by: Gonzalo Suárez
- Screenplay by: Gonzalo Suárez
- Based on: Dom Juan (play) by Molière
- Starring: Fernando Guillén; Mario Pardo; Charo López
- Cinematography: Carlos Suárez
- Edited by: José Salcedo
- Music by: Alejandro Massó
- Release dates: 25 June 1991 (Moscow); 13 September 1991 (Spain)
- Running time: 91 minutes
- Country: Spain
- Language: Spanish

Don Juan in Hell (Spanish: Don Juan en los infiernos) is a 1991 Spanish drama film directed by Gonzalo Suárez inspired by Molière's play. It stars Fernando Guillén as the titular character alongside Mario Pardo and Charo López.

== Cast ==
- Fernando Guillén as Don Juan
- Mario Pardo as Esganarel
- Charo López as Doña Elvira
- Héctor Alterio as padre de Don Juan ('Don Juan's father')
- Ana Álvarez as chica india ('Indian girl')
- Manuel de Blas as buhonero ('peddler')
- Ignacio Aierra as Felipe II
- Olegar Fedoro as Marido Luis de Moor
- Yelena Samarina as dama de la ermita ('lady of the hermitage')
- Ayanta Barilli as dama ('lady')
- Alicia Sánchez
- Francisco Villar
- Juan Potau
- Cayetana Guillén

== Release ==
Don Juan in Hell was entered into the 17th Moscow International Film Festival. It was released theatrically in Spain on 13 September 1991.

== Accolades ==
| Year | Award | Category | Nominee(s) | Result | Ref. |
|---|---|---|---|---|---|
| 1992 | 6th Goya Awards | Best Film | | Nominated | |
| 1992 | 6th Goya Awards | Best Actor | Fernando Guillén | Won | |
| 1992 | 6th Goya Awards | Best Cinematography | Carlos Suárez | Nominated | |
| 1992 | 6th Goya Awards | Best Original Score | Alejandro Massó | Nominated | |
| 1992 | 6th Goya Awards | Best Production Supervision | Alejandro Vázquez | Nominated | |
| 1992 | 6th Goya Awards | Best Art Direction | Wolfgang Burmann | Nominated | |
| 1992 | 6th Goya Awards | Best Costume Design | Yvonne Blake | Nominated | |

== See also ==
- List of Spanish films of 1991
