= El mal (film) =

- Film poster
- Directed by: Juanma Bajo Ulloa
- Screenplay by: Juanma Bajo Ulloa
- Starring: Belén Fabra; Natalia Tena; Tony Dalton; Maria Schwinning; Fernando Gil; Natalia Ruiz; Aritz Kortabarria
- Cinematography: Diego Trenas
- Edited by: Álvaro Herrero
- Music by: Koldo Uriarte
- Production companies: Frágil Zinema; El mal la película AIE
- Distributed by: 39 Escalones Films
- Release dates: November 2025 (Mar del Plata); 16 January 2026 (Spain)
- Running time: 129 minutes
- Country: Spain
- Language: Spanish

El mal is a 2025 Spanish thriller film written and directed by Juanma Bajo Ulloa. It stars Belén Fabra, Natalia Tena, and Tony Dalton.

== Plot ==
The plot follows writer Elvira, who is approached by serial killer Martín to write about them, prompting her to question her own ethics.

== Cast ==
- Belén Fabra as Elvira Nous
- Natalia Tena as Martín
- Tony Dalton as Thomas
- Fernando Gil as Elías
- Maria Schwinning as Sandra
- Aritz Kortabarria as Chaz
- Natalia Ruiz

== Production ==
According to Bajo Ulloa, the first draft for the story dated from 2006. In 2011, the project received a €40,000 funding for development. In 2020, RTVE purchased rights to the film for €700,000. It was also acquired by EiTB. The film was shot in late 2024 in Álava. The film is a Frágil Zinema and El mal la película AIE production.

== Release ==
El mal premiered at the Mar del Plata International Film Festival, included within the 'Hora Cero' programming. The film was released theatrically in Spain on 16 January 2026.

In February 2026, Bajo Ulloa attended the Iker Jiménez-hosted television show Horizonte and claimed that his film was a victim of the "woke dictatorship". The statements were hailed in right-wing media. At that point, the film had grossed €22,907.

== Reception ==
Pablo Vázquez of Fotogramas rated the film 3 out of 5 stars, describing it as "decidedly misanthropic, twisted and autarkic", highlighting "its incorruptible suicidal soul and an imperial Belén Fabra" as the best things about it.

Carmen L. Lobo of La Razón gave the film a 3-star rating, singling out "its claustrophobic atmosphere" and the fact that "it is not politically correct" as the best things about the film, while resenting "several bits of dialogue that sound repetitive and a bit pompous".

Juanma González of Cinemanía rated the film 3½ out of 5 stars, declaring it "a fable about narcissism that does not give a hoot about anything and lacks any sense of the ridiculous".

In a 2-star rating, Manuel J. Lombardo of Diario de Sevilla observed that the film may be interesting "not so much as a reflection on the lack of empathy, but rather as an exercise in style".

Javier Ocaña of El País assessed that, as in Butterfly Wings, El mal displays "the audacity of one who owes nothing to anyone and is unbothered by moral constraints".

== See also ==
- List of Spanish films of 2026
