= Sílvia Marsó =

Spanish film, stage, and television actress

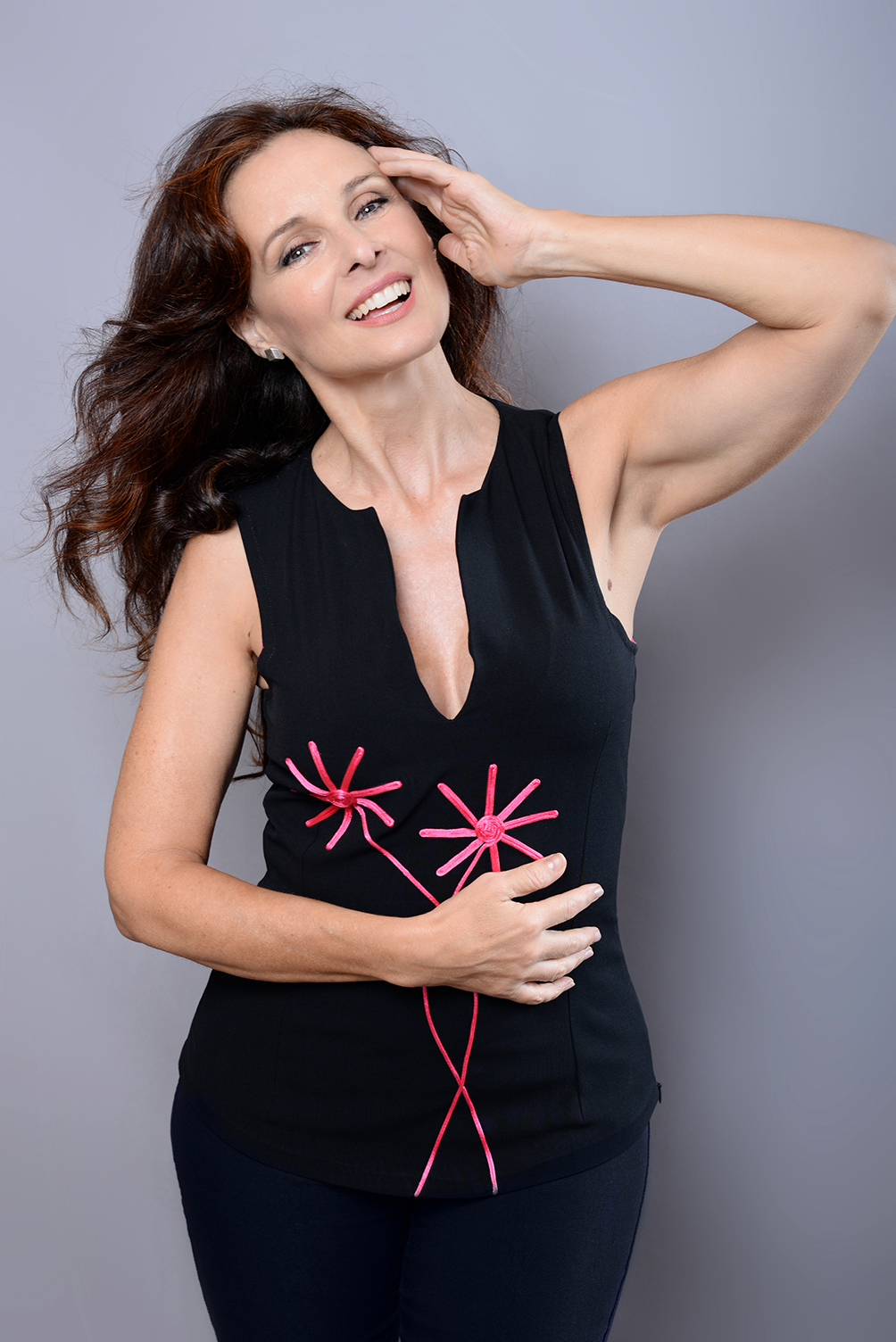
- Born: Sílvia Cartañá Ortega; 8 March 1963 (age 63); Barcelona, Spain
- Website: http://www.silviamarso.com

Sílvia Cartañá Ortega (Barcelona, 8 March 1963), better known as Sílvia Marsó is a Spanish film, stage and television actress and theatre producer. She started her career in the Televisión Española's game show Un, dos, tres... responda otra vez.

== Biography ==
At the age of 14, she enrolled in the Pantomime School at the Barcelona Institut del Teatre, and her first public appearance was in the Gothic Quarter of Barcelona with a street performance alongside some of her classmates, including Paco Mir from Tricicle and Jürgen Müller from La Fura dels Baus. It was then that she adopted her stage name in homage to the French mime Marcel Marceau.

== Television ==
- 1981: Gent d, aquí (TVE Cataluña).
- 1983–1984: Un, dos, tres... responda otra vez (TVE).
- 1984–1985: Y sin embargo...te quiero (TVE).
- 1985: Los sabios (TVE).
- 1985: La Comedia Musical Española "Las leandras", "El sobre verde" (TVE).
- 1986: Harem (BBC).
- 1986: Segunda enseñanza (TVE).
- 1986: Turno de oficio (TVE).
- 1987: Un, dos, tres... responda otra vez (TVE).
- 1987: La voz humana "Avecilla" (TVE).
- 1989: Primera función "Ocho mujeres" (TVE).
- 1990–1991: Telecupón (Telecinco).
- 1993: Farmacia de guardia (Antena 3).
- 1993: Los ladrones van a la oficina (Antena 3).
- 1994–1995: Canguros (Antena 3).
- 1995: Mar de dudas (TVE).
- 1997: Pasen y vean "Sublime decisión", "Julieta tiene un desliz" (Telecinco).
- 1997: La banda de Perez (TVE).
- 1998: Manos a la obra (Antena 3).
- 2001: 7 vidas (Telecinco).
- 2002–2004: Ana y los 7 (TVE).
- 2008: El porvenir es largo (TVE).
- 2020: El secreto de Puente Viejo (Antena 3)

== Filmography ==
- 1985: El donante, by Tito Fernández.
- 1994: La madre muerta, by Juanma Bajo Ulloa.
- 2001: Amor, curiosidad, prozak y dudas, by Miguel Santesmases
- 2002: Nosotras, by Judith Colell
- 2005: Cuadrilátero, by José Carlos Ruíz
- 2007: Ángeles S.A. by Eduard Bosch, with María Isabel, Pablo Carbonell and Anabel Alonso
- 2007: Freedomless, by Xoel Pamos
- 2007: Myway, by Toni Salgot
- 2008: Pájaros muertos, by Guillermo and Jorge Sempere
- 2018: Sin novedad by Miguel Berzal de Miguel with Silvia Espigado, Fernando Guillen Cuervo, Gonzalo Castro, Esmeralda Moya.

== Theatre ==
- 1989: Lend Me a Tenor (Búscame un tenor) by Ken Ludwig, directed by Alexander Herold.
- 1989: La Folle de Chaillot (La loca de Chaillot) by Jean Giraudoux, directed by José Luis Alonso.
- 1991: Hecuba by Euripides, directed by Emilio Hernández.
- 1991: The Lady of the Dawn (La dama del alba) by Alejandro Casona, directed by Juan Carlos Pérez de la Fuente.
- 1992: La Gran Sultana by Miguel de Cervantes, directed by Adolfo Marsillach.
- 1995: Three Tall Women (Tres mujeres altas) by Edward Albee directed by Jaime Chávarri.
- 1998: Doña Rosita the Spinster (|Doña Rosita la soltera) by Federico García Lorca, directed by José Tamayo.
- 2000: I Love You, You're Perfect, Now Change (Te quiero, eres perfecto... ya te cambiaré) by Joe DiPietro and Jimmy Roberts, directed by Esteve Ferrer.
- 2005: Can't Pay? Won't Pay! (Aquí no paga nadie) by Dario Fo, directed by Esteve Ferrer.
- 2006: Life x 3 (Tres versiones de la vida) by Yasmina Reza, directed by Natalia Menéndez.
- 2010: House of Dolls by Henrik Ibsen, directed by Amelia Ochandiano.
- 2012: Yerma by Federico García Lorca, directed by Miguel Narros.
- 2013: Capitalismo, hazles reír by Juan Cavestany, directed by Andrés Lima.
- 2014: The Glass Menagerie (El zoo de cristal) by Tennessee Williams, directed by Francisco Vidal.
- 2016: La puerta de al lado by Fabrice Roger Lacan, directed by Sergio Peris-Mencheta.
- 2017: Twenty-Four Hours in the Life of a Woman (24 horas en la vida de una mujer) by Stefan Zweig directed by Ignacio García.
