= Prime Time (2008 film) =

- Theatrical release poster
- Directed by: Luis Calvo Ramos
- Screenplay by: Luis Calvo Ramos; Gorka Magallón; Elena Serra (col.)
- Produced by: José María Asensi; Luis Calvo Ramos; Pablo Puyol
- Starring: Leticia Dolera; Alberto Amarilla; Pablo Puyol; María Agudo; Antonio Navarro; Mohamed Chafik; Rocío Muñoz; Ana Álvarez
- Cinematography: Gonzalo F. Berridi
- Edited by: Fidel Collados
- Music by: Antonio Meliveo
- Production companies: Kino PC; The Night of the Cats
- Distributed by: Buena Vista International
- Release dates: 10 October 2008 (Sitges); 25 December 2008 (Spain)
- Country: Spain
- Language: Spanish

Prime Time is a 2008 Spanish thriller film directed by Luis Calvo Ramos. Its cast features Leticia Dolera and Alberto Amarilla.

== Plot ==
Elena, a psychologist involved with dealing with victims of terrorism, is abducted, sedated, and forcibly taken along with her boyfriend Jaime to a circular room. They are told they are part of a macabre reality show together with another five individuals.

== Cast ==
- Leticia Dolera as Elena
- Alberto Amarilla as Jaime
- Pablo Puyol as Miguel Ángel
- María Agudo as Laura
- Antonio Navarro as Mateo
- Mohamed Chafik as Khaled
- Rocío Muñoz as Alicia
- Ana Álvarez as Mónica
- Alberto González as Ricardo
- Domingo Cruz as presentador

== Production ==
The film is a Kino PC and The Night of the Cats production. Shooting locations included Málaga and Benalmádena.

== Release ==
The film premiered on 10 October 2008 at the Sitges Film Festival. It was released theatrically in Spain on 25 December 2008.

== Reception ==
Toni Vall of Cinemanía rated the film 1 out of 5 stars, writing that "it is impossible to take a nonsense of such tremendous proportions seriously".

Javier Ocaña of El País wrote that Prime Time "is born as a dead film, as a dated film, as a rehash of ideas devoid of identity, as a commercial product with a dismal intellectual level".

Pere Vall of Fotogramas rated the film 2 out of 5 stars considering that it was missing some twist and "more, more money".

== See also ==
- List of Spanish films of 2008
