= Uptown (1987 film) =

1987 Spanish film directed by José Luis García Berlanga

- Spanish: Barrios altos
- Directed by: José Luis García Berlanga
- Screenplay by: Salvador Maldonado
- Produced by: Alfredo Matas; Helena Matas
- Starring: Victoria Abril; Juanjo Puigcorbé; Carmen Conesa; Lorenzo Santamaría
- Cinematography: Jose Mª Civit
- Edited by: Luis Manuel Del Valle
- Music by: Bernardo Bonezzi
- Production companies: Jet Films; In-Cine
- Distributed by: In-Cine
- Release date: 2 October 1987
- Running time: 87 minutes
- Country: Spain
- Language: Spanish

Uptown (Spanish: Barrios altos) is a 1987 Spanish comedy-drama film directed by José Luis García Berlanga. The film stars Victoria Abril as a Barcelonian divorcée who investigates the presumed murder of her masseur.

== Plot ==
In Barcelona, Verónica is a divorced single mother with a son named Nico. At a massage parlor, she is best friends with Carlos, her masseur. Later that night, Carlos steps aboard a yacht near the docks and leaves with a suitcase. Having followed him, two men inside a car attack Carlos, who drops the suitcase during the chase. Carlos escapes when he hoists the car upon a crane, suspending it into the air.

Elsewhere at a party, Verónica and her friend Ana are greeted by Verónica's ex-husband Edmundo, who introduces them to his business partner, Guillermo Kramer. Carlos arrives at a railway station where he waits for the next train to Barcelona. However, he is located by the same men and as he tries to hide, he leaves a message on the answering machine for Verónica.

The next morning, her boyfriend Luis awakens Verónica and she is driven to the police station. There, she identifies the corpse is Carlos. Inspector Román, having found Verónica's address on Carlos's person, suspects his death was a suicide. Later that day, after Verónica returns home with her son, she finds Carlos's message, stating he left a package hidden in the men's bathroom at a railway station.

At the station, Verónica finds a plastic bag of Carlos's photographs inside the toilet cistern. One of the photographs is the Nefer yacht, where she immediately hides below the deck. There, she witnesses a man called "the Hungarian" hold two men at gunpoint and is handed two bags of gold. When they leave, Verónica escapes with the suitcase but falls off the yacht when she tries to hide. A pickup driver returns Verónica to Barcelona.

Back home, Verónica takes Luis to an adult show, where she sees the Hungarian perform onstage. Backstage, she asks to see him but learns he has left. His partner directs her to a bar where two friends of his take her behind the restrooms at a beach and beat her. Along a sidewalk, two men attempt to nab her but she flees. On the run, Verónica takes an impromptu cab ride and runs inside a bank to hide. Exhausted, Verónica is unable to explain herself and she is returned home.

Later that night, Verónica meets the Hungarian and learns he and Carlos were partners. Although he is gentle but rough with Verónica, the Hungarian seeks to recover the missing suitcase. She meets with Ana, who tells her the Nefer is owned by Kramer International, Inc. With Kramer as a new lead, Verónica searches inside Carlos's locker at the parlor until she is knocked unconscious. She is taken to a hospital where Inspector Román and Ana express concern for Verónica's well-being.

Back at Verónica's apartment, the Hungarian returns with the suitcase, to which Verónica hides the gold. Shortly after, the Hungarian is arrested. As it turns, Carlos is alive, having faked his death. He explains to Verónica that Kramer had hired him to smuggle gold and jewelry for him. However, Kramer is under investigation by the financial crimes unit, and Carlos took photographs to document it.

Verónica discovers Edmundo and Luis are leaving for a business trip with Kramer in Geneva. Suspecting they are involved in Kramer's criminality, she tries to phone Inspector Román, but he is having sex with Ana. Edmundo and Luis strap Verónica onto a chair and place duct tape over her mouth. Meanwhile, Mary Lou and Ana return Nico back home, and they free her. Inspector Román arrives and returns Verónica's stolen belongings. He also releases the Hungarian, where he and Verónica share a kiss.

== Cast ==
- Victoria Abril as Verónica Miralles née Beltrán
- Carmen Conesa as Ana Rives
- Juanjo Puigcorbé as Luis
- Pepe Rubianes as Edmundo Miralles
- Abel Folk as Carlos Sanjuán
- Llorenç Santamaria as Hungaro aka Bobby
- Mario Gas as Inspector Román
- Albert Vidal as Guillermo Kramer
- Jesus Genius as Duro 1
- Mingo Ràfols i Olea as Duro 2
- Albert Tovias as Duro 3
- Juan Fairen as Corpulento
- Luciano Federico as Quimico
- Julia Carrasco as Mary Lou
- Pablo Tebar as Nico Miralles
- Jordi Raurich as Jordi

== See also ==
- List of Spanish films of 1987
