= El extraño caso del doctor Fausto =

1969 film

- Directed by: Gonzalo Suárez
- Written by: Gonzalo Suárez
- Produced by: Luis del Castillo; Gonzalo Suárez
- Starring: Gonzalo Suárez
- Cinematography: José Gaspar
- Edited by: Maricel Bautista
- Release date: 26 December 1969
- Running time: 82 minutes
- Country: Spain
- Language: Spanish

El extraño caso del doctor Fausto (lit. 'The strange case of Dr. Faust') is a 1969 Spanish drama film directed by and starring Gonzalo Suárez and entered the 20th Berlin International Film Festival.

== Cast ==
- Gonzalo Suárez - Narrador / Mefistófeles / Octavio Beiral
- Alberto Puig - Doctor Fausto
- Olga Vidali - Helena de Troya
- Gila Hodgkinson - Margarita
- José Arranz - Euforion
- Teresa Gimpera - Esfinge
- Emma Cohen
- Charo López
