= A Flame in My Heart =

1987 film by Alain Tanner

- Theatrical release poster
- French: Une flamme dans mon cœur
- Directed by: Alain Tanner
- Written by: Myriam Mézières; Alain Tanner
- Produced by: Paulo Branco
- Starring: Myriam Mézières; Benoît Régent; Aziz Kabouche
- Cinematography: Acácio de Almeida
- Edited by: Laurent Uhler
- Production companies: Garance; La Sept Cinéma; Filmograph
- Distributed by: BAC Films (France); Regina Films (Switzerland)
- Release dates: 3 June 1987 (France); 20 August 1987 (Switzerland)
- Running time: 110 minutes
- Countries: Switzerland; France
- Language: French

A Flame in My Heart (French: Une flamme dans mon cœur) is a 1987 Swiss-French drama film co-written and directed by Alain Tanner. It stars Myriam Mézières, Benoît Régent and Aziz Kabouche, and centres on a woman’s shifting relationships with two men. The film later screened in Cape Town, Alès and Santiago de Compostela.

== Synopsis ==
The film follows Mercedes, a theatre actress, as her turbulent relationship with Johnny, a young Algerian immigrant, comes to an end and she begins a new relationship with Pierre, a journalist. After Pierre goes away on a business trip, Mercedes becomes increasingly withdrawn and isolates herself.

== Cast ==
The cast includes:

- Myriam Mézières as Mercedes
- Aziz Kabouche as Johnny
- Benoît Régent as Pierre
- Biana as the friend
- Jean-Yves Berteloot as the partner
- André Marcon as Etienne
- Jean-Gabriel Nordmann as the director

== Reception ==
The Los Angeles Times wrote that the film offered an “honest or credible delineation” of obsessive love, and described it as a film of “considerable complexity”, involving “issues of culture and class as well as sex and politics”. The New York Times described the film as an interesting work by a first-class filmmaker.

Filmdienst described it as a confused, speculative and dishonest film about obsessive love. Filmpodium quoted an assessment that Tanner could address both the world and sex without losing his personal perspective. Der Tagesspiegel wrote that the film’s portrayal of an obsessive relationship had made a strong impression.

== Festival screenings ==
The film premiered in 1987. Later festival screenings included the Cape Town International Film Festival in 1993, the Festival Cinéma d'Alès in 1994, and Cineuropa 35 in Santiago de Compostela in 2021.
