= Atolladero =

- Theatrical release poster
- Directed by: Óscar Aibar
- Written by: Óscar Aibar
- Based on: Atolladero Texas by Óscar Aibar
- Produced by: Arturo Duque
- Starring: Pere Ponce; Joaquín Hinojosa; Iggy Pop; Félix Rotaeta; Pep Molina; Carlos Lucas; Ion Gabella; Oriol Tramvia
- Cinematography: Carles Gusi
- Edited by: Anastasi Rinos; Javier Cabrera
- Music by: Javier Navarrete
- Production company: FDG
- Release dates: October 1995 (Sitges); 14 August 1997 (Spain)
- Country: Spain
- Language: Spanish

Atolladero is a 1995 Spanish Western science-fiction film written and directed by Óscar Aibar (in his film debut) starring Pere Ponce. It is adapted from the comic book story published in the magazine Makoki.

== Plot ==
Set in 2048 in the fictional town of Atolladero, Texas, close to the Mexican border, the plot is split in four chapters: "Los hombres", "Los perros", "Las pistolas", and "Los reptiles". It follows deputy sheriff Lennie, who wants to leave the place, requiring permission from the Judge Wedley.

== Cast ==
- Pere Ponce as Lennie
- Joaquín Hinojosa as Nick
- Félix Rotaeta as Sal
- Carlos Lucas as Stampy
- Ion Gabella as Vince
- Oriol Tramvia as predicador ('preacher')
- Benito Pocino as lugareño ('villager')
- Ariadna Gil as india ('Indian')
- Iggy Pop as Madden
- Emilio Muñoz as indio ('Indian')
- Xevi Collelmir as juez ('judge')
- Mónica van Campen as Darlene
- Mercè Pons as Sra. Hannisses
- Lluís Termes as Billy
- Eulalia Campoy as Vicenta
- Pep Molina

== Production ==
Atolladero is based on the comic book story Atolladero Texas written by Óscar Aibar and illustrated by Miguel Ángel Martín in the magazine Makoki. It was produced by Arturo Duque for FDG. Shooting locations included the Bardenas Reales in Navarre. Cast member Félix Rotaeta died during the filming.

== Release ==
The film screened in the competitive slate of the Sitges Film Festival in October 1995. It was released theatrically in Spain on 14 August 1997. The 58th Sitges Film Festival selected the film for a retrospective screening in October 2025.

== Reception ==
Casimiro Torreiro of El País found the film to be a disappointment, writing that "from a scriptwriter, be it [for] a comic book or a film script, one expects at least a solvent script, and this is not the case". Also reviewing for El País, Luis Martínez found an "elaborate production design and a cast of actors who exude character" to be elements playing in the film's favour, while citing the "certainly anemic" story as the downside.

== See also ==
- List of Spanish films of 1997
