= Chatarra =

- Film poster
- Directed by: Félix Rotaeta
- Screenplay by: Michel Gaztambide; Félix Rotaeta; Domingo Sánchez; J.A. Vitoria
- Story by: Michel Gaztambide
- Produced by: Victoria Borràs; Rosa Romero
- Starring: Carmen Maura; Mario Gas; Rosario Flores; Àlex Casanovas; María Orozco; Santi Ricart; Pere Ponce; Maria Reniu; Walter Vidarte
- Cinematography: Josep M. Civit
- Edited by: Ernest Blasi
- Music by: Carlos Miranda
- Production companies: Avanti Films; Sabre TV
- Release dates: September 1991 (Venice); 18 October 1991 (Spain)
- Country: Spain
- Language: Spanish

Chatarra is a 1991 Spanish neo-noir film directed by Félix Rotaeta which stars Carmen Maura, Rosario Flores, and Mario Gas.

== Plot ==
Hooker Zabu, living badly with her daughter, is upended by the appearance of a stalking cop claiming to be her daughter's father, and vowing to take them two out of the fringes.

== Cast ==
- Carmen Maura as Zabú
- Mario Gas as el policía
- Rosario Flores as Mariló
- Àlex Casanovas as Lino
- María Orozco as Lola
- Santi Ricart as Bambi
- Pere Ponce as Romero
- María Reniú as Madame Club Siempre
- Walter Vidarte as Roca

== Production ==
The film was produced by Avanti Films and Sabre TV.

== Release ==
The film screened in competition at the 48th Venice International Film Festival in September 1991. It was released theatrically in Spain on 18 October 1991.

== Reception ==
Ángel Fernández-Santos of El País deemed Chatarra to be an "uneven film, but with flashes of great cinema".

Casimiro Torreiro of El País considered that, while not a perfect film, "with its faults and virtues, [Chatarra] nevertheless belongs to the line of independent films made with rigor and a good production design".

== See also ==
- List of Spanish films of 1991
