= J'entends plus la guitare =

1991 film

- Film poster
- Directed by: Philippe Garrel
- Written by: Marc Cholodenko; Philippe Garrel
- Produced by: Bernard Palacios; Gérard Vaugeois
- Starring: Benoît Régent; Johanna ter Steege
- Cinematography: Caroline Champetier
- Edited by: Sophie Coussein; Yann Dedet
- Music by: Faton Cahen
- Distributed by: Les Films de l'Atalante
- Release date: 11 September 1991 (France)
- Country: France
- Language: French

J'entends plus la guitare (also known as I Don't Hear the Guitar Anymore and I Can No Longer Hear the Guitar) is a 1991 French semi-autobiographical drama film written and directed by Philippe Garrel. It was screened in competition at the 48th Venice International Film Festival, in which it won the Silver Lion. The film was given a US release in 2008, to critical acclaim.

== Cast ==
- Benoît Régent as Gerard
- Johanna ter Steege as Marianne
- Yann Collette as Martin
- Mireille Perrier as Lola
- Brigitte Sy as Aline
- Anouk Grinberg as Adrienne
