= Benoît Régent =

French actor

- Born: 19 December 1953; Nantes, France
- Died: 22 October 1994 (aged 40); Zürich, Switzerland

Benoît Régent (19 December 1953 – 22 October 1994) was a French actor.

He was born in Nantes. He died at the age of 41 of a ruptured aneurysm in Zürich, Switzerland.

== Partial filmography ==
- Femme intégrale (1980) - Jacques
- La Peau de chagrin (1980, TV Movie) - Bixiou
- Peer Gynt (1981, TV Movie) - Un jeune homme
- L'Indiscrétion (1982) - L'employé de la FNAC
- Un dimanche de flic (1983) - Makovski
- Stella (1983) - Chef F.F.I
- La Java des ombres (1983) - Le dealer
- Dangerous Moves (1984) - Barabal
- Mon ami Washington (1984) - Jacques Trentin
- Train d'enfer (1984) - Jouffroy
- L'Été prochain (1985) - Le médecin
- Rouge-gorge (1985) - Philippe Page
- Subway (1985) - Le Vendeur
- Spéciale police (1985) - Livio
- Adieu la vie (1986, TV Series) - Malard
- Bleu comme l'enfer (1986) - Henri
- Un homme et une femme, 20 ans déjà (1986) - Un infirmier
- Round Midnight (1986) - Psychiatrist
- Noir et blanc (1986)
- A Flame in My Heart (Une flamme dans mon cœur) (1987) - Pierre
- Nouilles (1987, Short) - Un client
- L'Île aux oiseaux (1988) - Vincent
- Accord parfait (1988) - Le père
- La Maison de Jeanne (1988) - Pierre
- Savannah (1988) - Le pompiste
- La Bande des quatre (1989) - Thomas
- A Soldier's Tale (1989) - Father Superior
- Bunker Palace Hôtel (1989) - Nikolaï
- Dr. M (1990) - Stieglitz
- Jean Galmot, aventurier (1990) - Alexandre Stavisky
- J'entends plus la guitare (1991) - Gerard
- Pierre qui roule (1991, TV Movie) - Pierre
- Parking (1992, TV Series) - Le Gardien
- Three Colors: Blue (1993) - Olivier
- Jeux d'enfants (1993, TV Movie) - Vincent
- Grand bonheur (1993) - Bernard
- Attendre le navire (1993)
- Three Colors: Red (1994) - Olivier
- Du fond du coeur (1994) - Benjamin Constant
- En mai, fais ce qu'il te plaît (1995) - Jean-Claude
- ...à la campagne (1995) - Benoît
- Noir comme le souvenir (1995) - Dr. David Wahl (final film role)
