= The Beach of Lost Children =

- Directed by: Jillali Ferhati
- Cinematography: Jacques Besse
- Edited by: Nathalie Perrey
- Music by: Djamel Allam
- Release date: 1991
- Running time: 88 min.
- Countries: France; Morocco
- Language: Arabic

The Beach of Lost Children (French: La Plage des enfants perdus, Arabic: شاطئ الأطفال الضائعين) is a 1991 French-Moroccan drama film written and directed by Jillali Ferhati. It was screened in competition at the 48th Venice International Film Festival.

== Cast ==
- Souad Ferhati as Mina
- Fatima Loukili as Zineb
- Mohamed Timod as Salam
- Larbi El Yacoubi as the father
