= Sonia Martínez =

Spanish actress and television presenter (1963–1994)

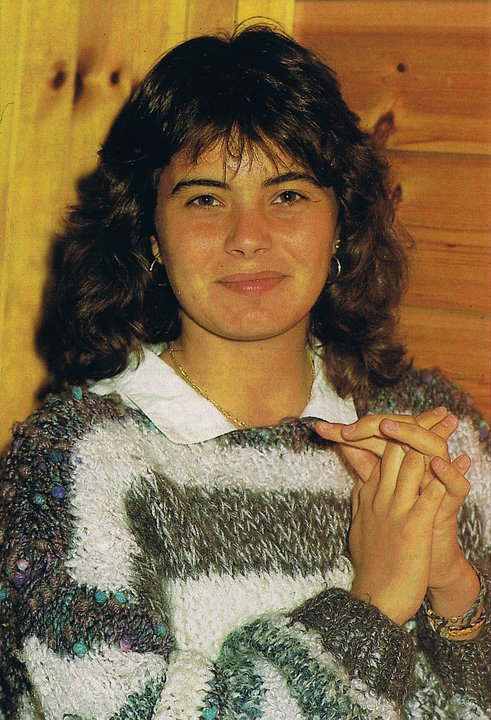
- Born: María Sonia Martínez Mecha; 23 September 1963; Madrid, Spain
- Died: 4 September 1994 (aged 30); Madrid, Spain
- Occupations: Actress; television presenter
- Years active: 1982–1994
- Relatives: Irene Martínez (sister)

María Sonia Martínez Mecha (23 September 1963 – 4 September 1994) was a Spanish actress and television presenter, known for her role in the Spanish version of the American science educational TV show 3-2-1 Contact, which aimed to teach science to children. Martínez played in films in the mid-1980s but is mainly known today for being one of the first Spanish celebrities to die from an AIDS-related illness.

== First years in TV ==
Martínez became a TV presenter after successful years as a teenage swimmer, winning a second prize in the championship of Castile. Her sister, Irene Martínez, was a gymnast, participating in the 1980 and 1984 Summer Olympic Games. Martínez appeared in 3-2-1 Contact on Televisión Española (TVE) from 1982 to 1983, when the Spanish series ceased. From 1983 to 1984, she worked on a second TVE show, called Dabadabadá, another children-oriented broadcast.

== As a cinema actress ==
She made her feature film debut as an actress in Gonzalo Suárez's Epilogue (1984). Her career was put an end in 1986, when she was in Ibiza filming the role of a policewoman in an episode of the German TV series Großstadtrevier. During a break in filming, a photographer took - without her permission - some semi-nude images of her that were published in the gossip magazine Interviu. As a result, she was dismissed from TVE, where she was presenting En la naturaleza, an environmental-themed show. Despite a successful attempt in the courts to recover her place on the TVE staff, Martínez's projected re-entry in La Bola de Cristal, (a pop-music and semi-underground broadcast linked to La Movida Madrileña) was truncated when it was dropped from the TVE schedules in 1988.

== Decline and death ==
As a consequence of these problems and some personal crises, Martínez became a heroin addict, and was diagnosed as being HIV-positive in 1990; she contracted HIV through intravenous drug use. Some people, including the pop composer José María Cano, tried to help her with detoxification treatments, and Martínez played her last film role in 1994. Her health was too damaged by HIV, and she died of AIDS-related complications on September 4, 1994, after becoming a target of tabloid media, including the new TV networks that broke the TVE's monopoly in 1989–1990.

Cano, after his music career, started a new life as a London-based painter and painted Take a walk on the wild side, a painting inspired by Martínez. The artwork was introduced in 2007 during an anti-drug campaign.
