= Jillali Ferhati =

Moroccan film director, actor and screenwriter

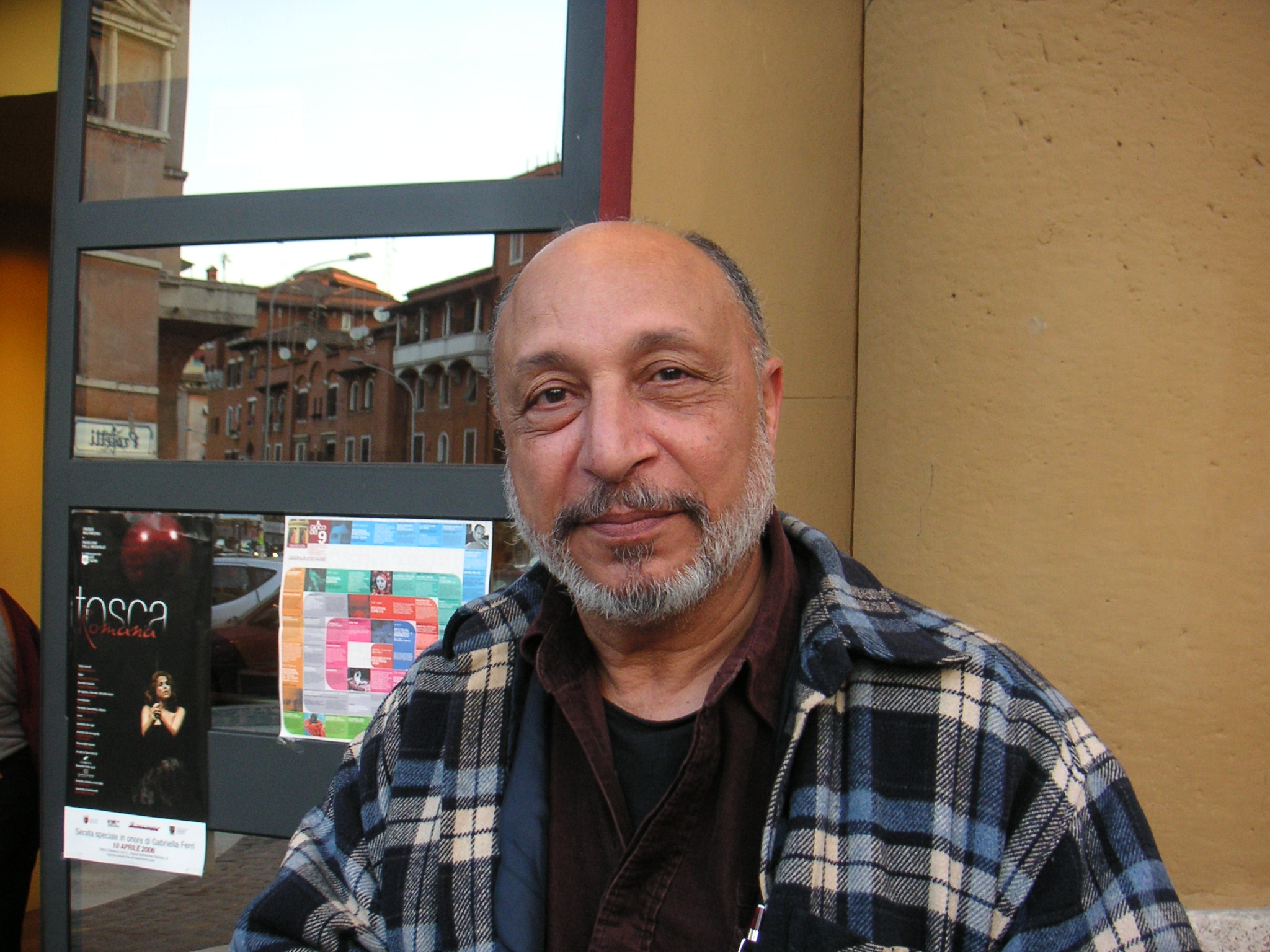
- Born: 3 August 1948 (age 77); Aït Ouahi near Khemisset, Morocco
- Education: sociology and literature
- Occupation: film director
- Years active: 1978–present
- Notable work: The Beach of Lost Children

Jillali Ferhati (Arabic: الجيلالي فرحاتي, born on 3 August 1948) is a Moroccan actor and filmmaker.

== Biography ==
Ferhati was born in 1948, in Aït Ouahi near Khemisset but grew up in Tangier. He studied sociology and literature in Paris and then launched his career in theater, working as an actor and director at the Theatre International in Paris. In 1982, he founded "Heracles Production", a production company.

His debut in cinema was in 1978 with the feature film Brèche dans le mur (A Breach In the Wall), selected for the Semaine de la Critique at the Cannes Film Festival. His 1982 film Arais Min Kassab was screened at the 1982 Cannes Film Festival in the Directors' Fortnight section, and his 1991 film The Beach of Lost Children was entered into the main competition at the 48th edition of the Venice Film Festival.

He was married to the director and screenwriter Farida Benlyazid, who often collaborated with him.

== Filmography ==
- 1978: A Breach in the Wall / Charkhun fi-l hâ'it
- 1981: Poupées de roseau / Araïs min qasab (Arais Min Kassab)
- 1986: The Dream of Tangiers
- 1991: The Beach of Lost Children / Shâtiu al-atfâl al-mafoûdin
- 1995: Horses of fortune / Kuius al-has
- 1995: Five films for a hundred years
- 2000: Braids
- 2004: Memory in detention
- 2009: From dawn
- 2013: Sarirou Al Assrar (Pillow secrets | Secrets d'oreiller)
- 2016–2017: Ultimate revolt
- 2025: La Guerre Des Six Mois
