= The Regent's Wife =

1975 film

- Directed by: Gonzalo Suárez
- Written by: Juan Antonio Porto
- Starring: Pilar Bardem
- Cinematography: Luis Cuadrado
- Music by: Angelo Francesco Lavagnino
- Release date: 24 April 1975
- Running time: 93 minutes
- Country: Spain
- Language: Spanish

The Regent's Wife (Spanish: La Regenta) is a 1975 Spanish drama film directed by Gonzalo Suárez. It was entered into the 9th Moscow International Film Festival.

== Cast ==
- Pilar Bardem
- Keith Baxter
- Nigel Davenport
- Maruchi Fresno
- Rosario García Ortega
- Agustín González
- Charo López
- Adolfo Marsillach
- Isabel Mestres
- Emma Penella
- María Luisa Ponte
