= 48th Venice International Film Festival =

Italian film festival in 1991

- Location: Venice, Italy
- Founded: 1932
- Awards: Golden Lion: Close to Eden
- Festival date: 3 – 14 September 1991
- Website: Website

Venice Film Festival chronology
- 49th 47th

The 48th annual Venice International Film Festival was held on 3 to 14 September 1991.

Italian film critic Gian Luigi Rondi was the Jury President of the main competition.

The Golden Lion winner was Close to Eden directed by Nikita Mikhalkov.

== Jury ==
=== Main Competition ===
The following people comprised the 1991 jury:

- Gian Luigi Rondi, Italian film critic and screenwriter - Jury President
- Jim Belushi, American actor
- Silvia D'Amico Bendicò, Italian
- John Boorman, British filmmaker
- Michel Ciment, French film critic
- Moritz de Hadeln, Swiss director and photographer
- Naum Kleiman, Soviet film critic
- Oja Kodar, Croatian actress and filmmaker
- Pilar Miró, Spanish filmmaker

== Official Sections ==
=== In Competition ===
English title	Original title	Director(s)	Production country
30 Door Key	Ferdydurke	Jerzy Skolimowski	Poland
The Beach of Lost Children	La plage des enfants perdus	Jillali Ferhati	Morocco, France
Chatarra		Félix Rotaeta	Spain
Close to Eden (Urga)	У́рга — территория любви	Nikita Mikhalkov	Soviet Union
The Divine Comedy	A Divina Comédia	Manoel de Oliveira	Portugal
Edward II		Derek Jarman	United Kingdom
The Fisher King		Terry Gilliam	United States
Germany Year 90 Nine Zero	Allemagne 90 neuf zéro	Jean-Luc Godard	France
I Don't Hear the Guitar Anymore	J'entends plus la guitare	Philippe Garrel	France
The Invisible Wall	Il muro di gomma	Marco Risi	Italy
Just Beyond This Forest	Jeszcze tylko ten las	Jan Łomnicki	Poland
Meeting Venus		István Szabó	United Kingdom, France, Italy
Mississippi Masala		Mira Nair	United States
My Own Private Idaho		Gus Van Sant	United States
Necessary Love	L'amore necessario	Fabio Carpi	Italy
Night and Day	Nuit et Jour	Chantal Akerman	Belgium
Prospero's Books		Peter Greenaway	United Kingdom
Raise the Red Lantern	大紅燈籠高高掛	Zhang Yimou	China, Hong Kong
Scream of Stone	Cerro Torre: Schrei aus Stein	Werner Herzog	Germany, France, Canada, Italy
The Secret Face	Gizli Yüz	Ömer Kavur	Turkey
A Simple Story	Una storia semplice	Emidio Greco	Italy
Walking a Tightrope	Les Équilibristes	Nicos Papatakis	France

=== Out of Competition ===
English title	Original title	Director(s)	Production country
American Friends		Tristram Powell	United Kingdom
Anima Mundi		Godfrey Reggio	United States, Italy
Atlantis		Luc Besson	France
Cup Final	גמר גביע	Eran Riklis	Israel
Dawn	L'alba	Francesco Maselli	Italy
Regarding Henry		Mike Nichols	United States
Rossini! Rossini!		Mario Monicelli	Italy
Sand Screens	Écrans de sable	Randa Chahal Sabag	France
The Sergeant	Goroohban	Masoud Kimiai	Iran
The Stranger	Agantuk	Satyajit Ray	India
Special events
I Dreamt I Woke Up		John Boorman	Ireland
Kyoto, My Mother's Place		Nagisa Ôshima	Japan

=== Fuoriprogramma ===
English title	Original title	Director(s)	Production country
Abschied vom Drehbuch		Petra Seeger	Germany
Corsica!		Nico Cirasola, Gianfrancesco Lazotti, Giorgio Molteni, Italo Spinelli, Pasquale Squitieri	Italy
Esquizo		Ricardo Bofill	Spain
The Gulf War... What Next?	Harb el khalij... wa baad	Borhane Alaouié, Néjia Ben Mabrouk, Nouri Bouzid, Mostafa Derkaoui, Elia Suleiman	Tunisia, Italy, United Kingdom, France
Il mito di Cinecittà		Giovanna Gagliardo	Italy
The Woman God Forgot (1917)		Cecil B. DeMille	United States

=== Mattinate del Cinema Italiano ===
English title	Original title	Director(s)	Production country
The 600 Days of Salo	I 600 giorni di Salò	Nicola Caracciolo, Valerio Marino	Italy
Ask for the Moon	Chiedi la luna	Giuseppe Piccioni	Italy
Barocco		Claudio Sestieri	Italy
Crack		Giulio Base	Italy
Faccia di lepre		Liliana Ginanneschi	Italy
The Martello Case	Il caso Martello	Guido Chiesa	Italy
Starry Night	Notte di stelle	Luigi Faccini	Italy
Sweet War, Farewell	Uova di garofano	Silvano Agosti	Italy
Where the Night Begins	Dove comincia la notte	Maurizio Zaccaro	Italy

== Independent Sections ==
=== Venice International Film Critics' Week ===
The following feature films were selected to be screened as In Competition for this section:

English title	Original title	Director(s)	Production country
Railway Bar	Bar des rails	Cédric Kahn	France
Drive		Jefery Levy	United States
The Sky Above Paris	Le ciel de Paris	Michel Béna	France
Nowhere Man	Muno no hito	Naoto Takenaka	Japan
Clouds	Nuvem	Ana Luísa Guimarães	Portugal
The Intruder	Razlucnica	Amir Karakulov	Soviet Union
Scorpion’s Garden	Sady skorpiona	Oleg Kovalov	Soviet Union
Vito and the Others	Vito e gli altri	Antonio Capuano	Italy
Waiting		Jackie McKimmie	Australia, United Kingdom
Special events
The Fall of Berlin (1950)	Падение Берлина	Mikheil Chiaureli	Soviet Union

== Official Awards ==
=== Main Competition ===
- Golden Lion: Close to Eden by Nikita Mikhalkov
- Grand Special Jury Prize: A Divina Comédia by Manoel de Oliveira
- Silver Lion:
  - The Fisher King by Terry Gilliam
  - Raise the Red Lantern by Yimou Zhang
  - J'entends plus la guitare by Philippe Garrel
- Golden Osella:
  - Best Screenplay: Mississippi Masala by Sooni Taraporevala
- Volpi Cup for Best Actor: River Phoenix for My Own Private Idaho
- Volpi Cup for Best Actress: Tilda Swinton for Edward II

=== Career Golden Lion ===
- Gian Maria Volonté

== Independent Awards ==
=== The President of the Italian Senate's Gold Medal ===
- Jean-Luc Godard for Allemagne année 90 neuf zéro

=== Golden Ciak ===
- Best Film: Mississippi Masala by Mira Nair
- Best Actor: Vittorio Mezzogiorno for Cerro Torre: Schrei aus Stein
- Best Actress: Glenn Close for Meeting Venus

=== FIPRESCI Prize ===
- Nowhere Man by Naoto Takenaka

=== OCIC Award ===
- Close to Eden by Nikita Mikhalkov
  - Honorable Mention:
    - Luigi Faccini

=== Pasinetti Award ===
- Best Film: Close to Eden by Nikita Mikhalkov
- Best Actor: Vittorio Mezzogiorno for Cerro Torre: Schrei aus Stein
- Best Actress: Mercedes Ruehl for The Fisher King

=== Pietro Bianchi Award ===
- Paolo Taviani
- Vittorio Taviani

=== Little Golden Lion ===
- The Fisher King by Terry Gilliam

=== Evira Notari Prize ===
- Raise the Red Lantern by Yimou Zhang
