= Gian Luigi Rondi =

Italian screenwriter (1921–2016)

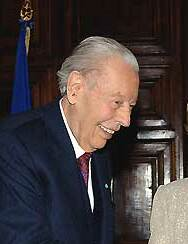
- Rondi in 2005

President for Life of The Academy of Italian Cinema - David di Donatello Awards
- In office 25 November 2009 – 22 September 2016

President of The Academy of Italian Cinema - David di Donatello Awards
- In office 26 September 1981 – 22 September 2016
- Preceded by: Paolo Grassi
- Succeeded by: Giuliano Montaldo (ad interim)

Vice President of The Academy of Italian Cinema - David di Donatello Awards
- In office 20 October 1979 – 26 September 1981
- Preceded by: Established office
- Succeeded by: Elena Valenzano

Personal details
- Born: 10 December 1921 Tirano, Italy
- Died: 22 September 2016 (aged 94) Rome, Italy
- Occupation: film critic

Gian Luigi Rondi (10 December 1921 – 22 September 2016) was an Italian film critic. He was a member of the jury at the 12th and 15th Moscow International Film Festival. He was also a member of the jury at the 11th and 32nd Berlin International Film Festival. He was also a member of the jury three times at the Cannes Film Festival in 1963, 1967 and 1980. He was the president of the jury at the 48th Venice Film Festival. A closeted homosexual for most of his life, he was married to Yvette Spadaccini from 1948 to her death in 2012.

== Selected filmography ==
- Obsession (1954)
