= Dueling Techniques: A Matter of Honor =

- Movie poster for "Técnicas de duelo"
- Directed by: Sergio Cabrera
- Written by: Humberto Dorado
- Cinematography: José Medeiros
- Music by: Juan Márquez
- Release date: 1988
- Running time: 97 minutes
- Country: Colombia
- Language: Spanish

Dueling Techniques: A Matter of Honor (Spanish: Técnicas de duelo: Una cuestión de honor) is a Colombian comedy film released in 1988 directed by Sergio Cabrera.

== Plot ==
A teacher and butcher in a small town in the Andes Mountains are both in love with Miriam. They have decided to duel for her. The film addresses the Latin code of honor and machismo that led to the decision to duel. Instead of trying to prevent it, the mayor takes bets on the duel.

== Production ==
- Sergio Cabrera - director
- Humberto Dorado - writer
- José Medeiros - cinematographer
- Enrique Linero - production design

== Reception ==
In 2016, film critic Jeronimo Rivera-Betancur of El Tiempo rated the film at No. 9 in his list of his favorite Colombian fiction films.

== Cast ==
- Frank Ramírez, as Teacher Albarracín
- Humberto Dorado, as Butcher Oquendo
- Florina Lemaitre, as Miriam
