= Anything for Bread =

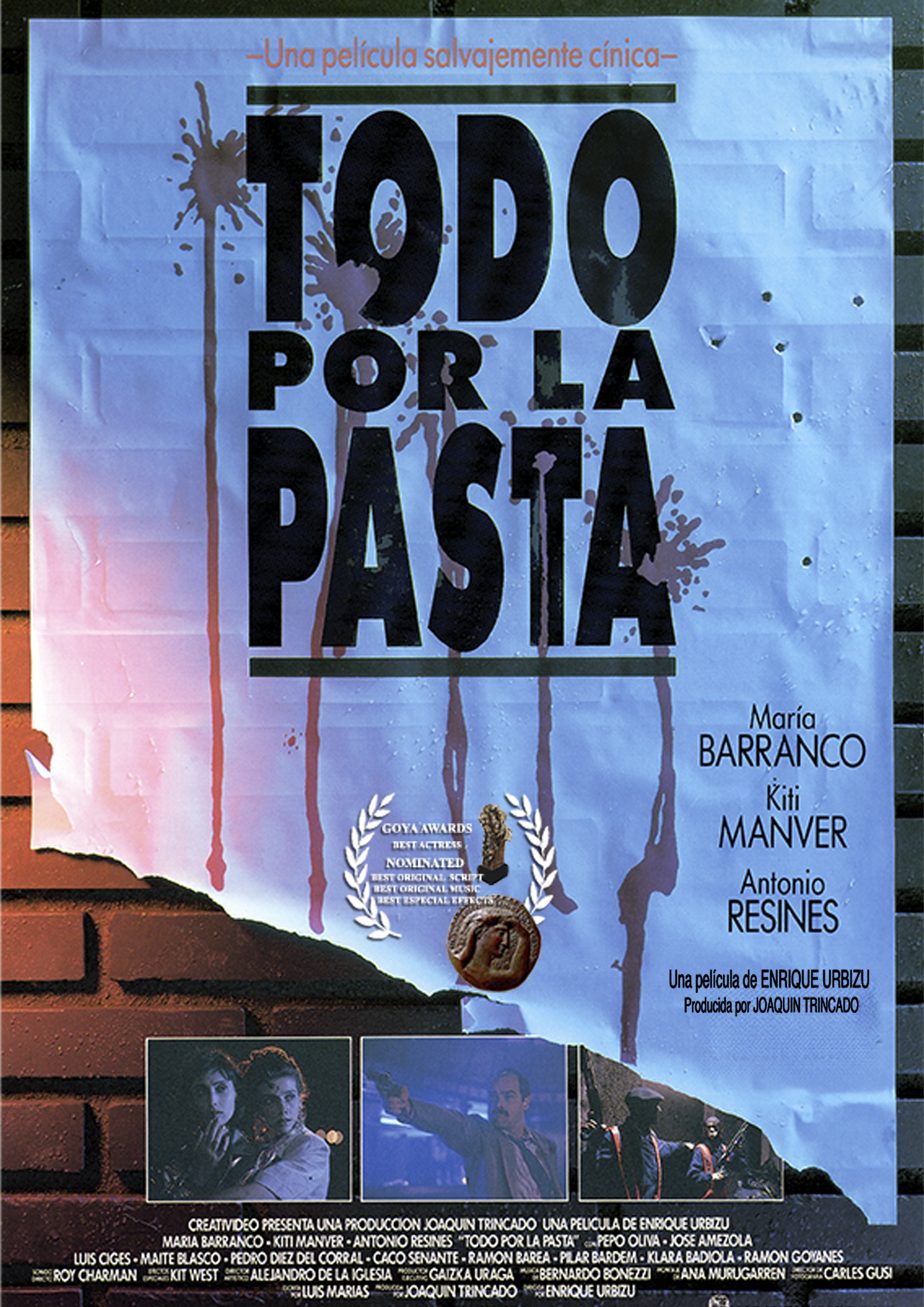
- Directed by: Enrique Urbizu
- Written by: Luis Marías
- Produced by: Joaquín Trincado (producer); Gaizka Uraga (executive producer)
- Starring: María Barranco; Kiti Mánver; Antonio Resines; Pepo Oliva; José Amezola
- Cinematography: Carles Gusi
- Edited by: Ana Murugarren
- Music by: Bernardo Bonezzi
- Distributed by: Creativideo
- Release date: 14 August 1991 (Spain)
- Running time: 88 minutes
- Country: Spain
- Language: Spanish

Anything for Bread (Spanish: Todo por la pasta) is a 1991 Spanish film directed by Enrique Urbizu and written by Luis Marías.

== Premise ==
The film centres on an armed robbery within a bingo hall, within a background in the underworld of drug dealing, sexual perversion, police corruption and a political assassination. Woven through this are the stories of two very different women from opposite backgrounds. Azucena is a robber fleeing the scene when she is picked up by a young woman, Verónica. Both are vulnerable, having been threatened and betrayed, and soon start fighting against each other to gain the proceeds of the robbery. As they get to know each other, they develop a mutual respect, and this helps them fight the dangerous men who are chasing them. The two women eventually become sisters-in-arms and keep the stolen money.

== Cast ==
- María Barranco as Azucena
- Kiti Manver as Verónica
- Antonio Resines as Ángel
- Pepo Oliva as Pereda
- José Amezola as David
- Luis Ciges as José María
- Caco Senante as Casares
- Maite Blasco as Asunción
- Klara Badiola as Sor Inés
- Pedro Díez del Corral as Blasco
- Pilar Bardem as Begoña
- Ramón Barea as Aniceto
- Ramón Goyanes as Pascual

== Production ==
The director used Álex de la Iglesia's graphic work for production design.

It was filmed in Bilbao, Bakio, Santurce, Okondo, Getaria, Gipuzkoa and Arrieta, in the Basque region of Spain. The city of Bilbao gave the film a neo-noir look with a post modern-twist.

== Awards and nominations ==
=== Won ===
- Goya Awards
  - Best Supporting Actress (Kiti Manver)

=== Nominated ===
- Goya Awards
  - Best Original Score (Bernardo Bonezzi)
  - Best Screenplay – Original (Luis Marías)
  - Best Special Effects (Kit West)

== Reception ==
It has also been called "a satisfactory thriller".

One reviewer noted that the film was "a strange mixture of thriller and comedy", it has "great set pieces" but an "excessively jumbled script". It is an "irregular but sympathetic product".
