= Félix Rotaeta =

Spanish director and screenwriter

- Born: 1 April 1942; Madrid, Spain
- Died: 23 November 1994 (aged 52); Barcelona, Spain
- Occupations: Actor, director, novelist, screenwriter

Félix Rotaeta (1 April 1942 – 23 November 1994) was a Spanish actor, director, novelist, and screenwriter.

== Life and career ==
Born in Madrid, Rotaeta studied journalism and drama, and started his career on stage, writing and performing with the fringe theatre company Los Goliardos. He worked intensively as a character actor, and directed two feature films, El placer de matar (1987), based on his novel Las pistolas and starring Antonio Banderas and Victoria Abril, and Chatarra (1991), which was entered into the main competition at the 48th Venice International Film Festival.

== Death ==
In November 1994, while shooting the western film Atolladero, Rotoeta fell ill and died shortly after from septic shock and multiorgan failure, at the age of 52.
