= Sílvia Munt =

Spanish actress and film director

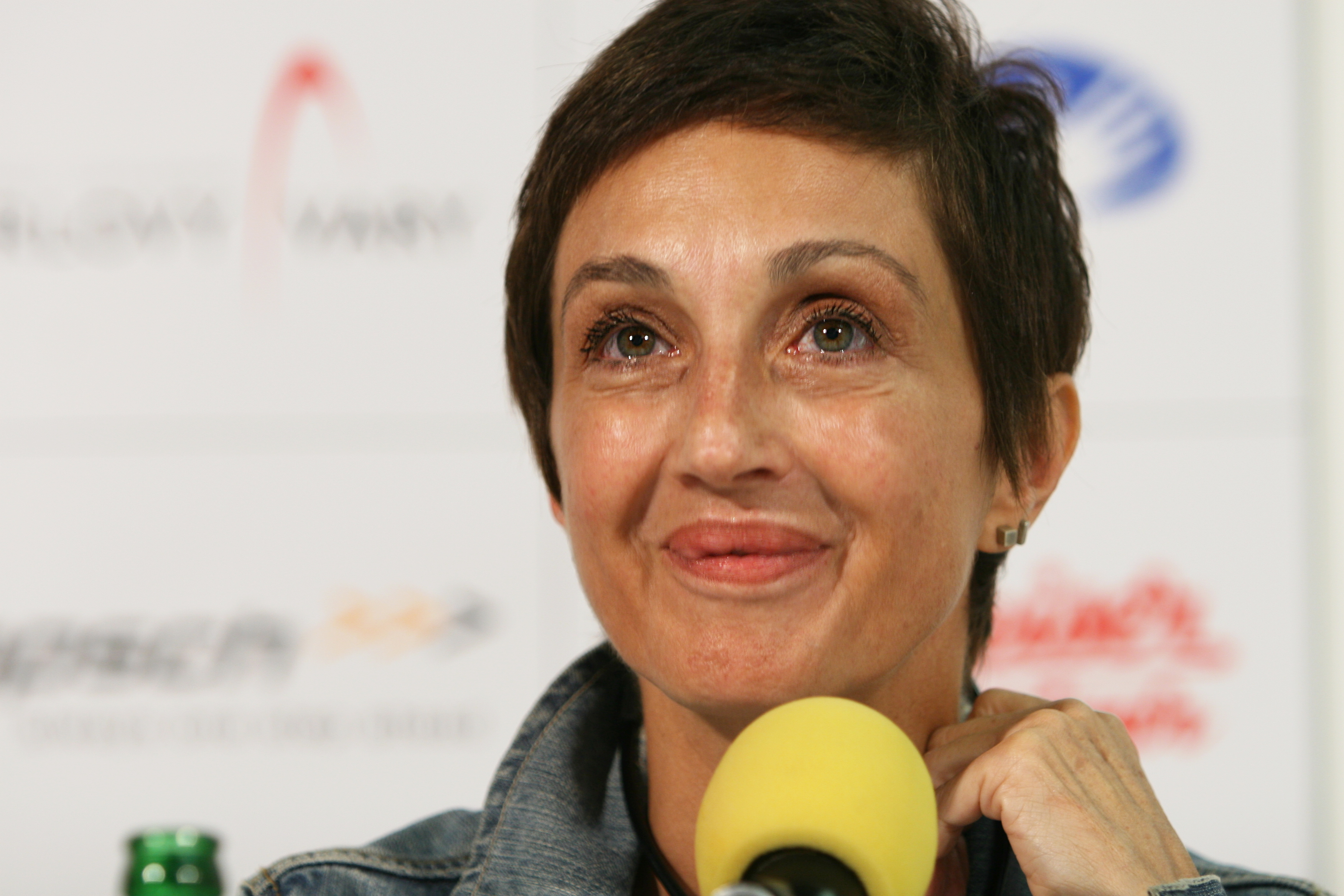
- Munt in 2008
- Born: Silvia Munt Quevedo; 24 March 1957 (age 69); Barcelona, Spain
- Occupations: Actress; director

Silvia Munt Quevedo (born 24 March 1957) is a Spanish actress and film director. She has won two Goya Awards, namely Best Actress for her role in Butterfly Wings, and Best Short Documentary, Lalia, which she wrote and directed. She has a sister and two brothers.

== Filmography ==
=== Cinema (as actress) ===
- 2006- Remake (Roger Gual)
- 2000- Aunque tú no lo sepas (Juan Vicente Córdoba)
- 1999- El viaje de Arián (Eduard Bosch)
- 1998- Subjudice (Josep Maria Forn)
- 1997- El faro (Manuel Balaguer)
- 1996- El dominio de los sentidos (episodio de Judith Collell)
- 1996- Una piraña en el bidé (Carlos Pastor)
- 1996- Secretos del corazón (Montxo Armendáriz).
- 1996- Todo está oscuro (Ana Díez)
- 1995- Asunto interno (Carles Balagué)
- 1995- Éxtasis (Mariano Barroso)
- 1995- Razones sentimentales (Antonio A. Farré)
- 1994- La pasión turca (Vicente Aranda)
- 1994- El rey del río (Manuel Gutiérrez Aragón)
- 1994- El porqué de las cosas (Ventura Pons)
- 1993- Nexo (Jordi Cadena)
- 1993- Los baúles del retorno (María Miró)
- 1993- Bloodline ("Lazos de sangre") (Pal Erdöss)
- 1992- Cucarachas (Toni Mora)
- 1992- El cazador furtivo (Carles Benpar)
- 1991- Alas de mariposa (Juanma Bajo Ulloa)
- 1991- Los papeles de Aspern (Jordi Cadena)
- 1987- Quimera (Carlos Pérez Ferré)
- 1985- Golfo de Vizcaya (Javier Rebollo)
- 1984- Bajo en nicotina (Raúl Artigot)
- 1984- Le grand voyage (Richard Dindó) (v.o. en francés)
- 1983- Soldados de plomo (José Sacristán)
- 1983- Sal gorda (Fernando Trueba)
- 1983- Akelarre (Pedro Olea)
- 1982- Pares y nones (José Luis Cuerda)
- 1981- La plaça del diamant (Francesc Betriu)

=== Cinema (as director) ===
- 2003- Elena Dimitrievna Diakonova. Gala (documentary)
- 1999- Lalia (short film)
- 1998- Déjeme que le cuente (short film)

=== Theatre (as actress) ===
- 2005- Surabaya, by Marc Rosich (Directora) Teatre Romea, Barcelona.
- 1996/97- Ángeles en América Tony Kushner. Dir. Josep M. Flotats TNC
- 1994- La muerte y la doncella Ariel Dorfman. Dir. Boris Rotenstein
- 1993- Cartas de amor A. R. Gurney. Dir. Josep Costa
- 1990- Las tres hermanas Anton Chekhov. Dir. Pierre Romans. Cía. J. Ma. Flotats
- 1990- Trío en Mi bemol Eric Rohmer. Dir. Fernando Trueba. Centro Dramático Nacional. Gira años 91 y 92.
- 1987- La Filla del Carmesí. J. Ma. de Sagarra. Dir. Jordi Mesalles.
- 1986- Romeo y Julieta William Shakespeare. Dir. Esteve Polls.
- 1986- Antígona Salvador Espriu. Dir. Joan Ollé.
- 1982- Cyrano de Bergerac Edmond Ronstand. Dir. Damià Barbany.
- 1979- La Blancarrosa, sirena de la mar blava. Damià Barbany.
- 1977- Sueño de una noche de verano William Shakespeare. Salón Diana.
- 1977- Canigó J. Verdaguer. Dir. Esteve Polls.

=== Theatre (as producer) ===
In 1987 she creates her own company:

- Ondina, by J. Giraudoux. Dir. Santiago Sans.
- La nieta del sol, by Ever M. Blanchet. Dir. Colectiva.

=== Television (as actress) ===
- 2004 - The Crown, telefilm by Peter de Vamm (Netherlands).
- 2004 - Palabras mágicas, telefilm by Octavi Masiá (Trivisión).
- 2003 - Le meilleur commerce du monde, telefilm by Bruno Gantillon (France).
- 2003 - Fragmentos, telefilm by Judith Collell.
- 2001 - Maxima's Miracle, telefilm by Paul Ruven (Pieter Van Huystee Film, Netherlands).
- 2002 - L´aîné des Ferchaux, telefilm in two parts by Bernard Stora. Prod. GMT-TF1 (France).
- 1998 - Tío Willy (series by Pablo Ibáñez for TVE).
- 1995 - Dones i homes, telefilm by Antoni Verdaguer para TV3.
- 1993 - Arnau (Lluis Ma. Güell), TV3.
- 1992 - Celia in the role of Madre Corazón, directed by José Luis Borau for Televisión Española (TVE).
- 1989 - El obispo leproso (José Ma. Gutiérrez), TVE.
- 1983 - Teresa de Jesús (Josefina Molina), TVE.
- 1981 - La plaza del diamante (Francesc Betriu), TVE.

=== Television (as director) ===
- 2006 - Cosses que passen, TV movie. Co-Prod. TV3 y Canal Sur.
- 2003 - Las hijas de Mohamed (telefilm).
- 2000 - Quia (telefilm for TV3).
