= Charo López =

Spanish actress

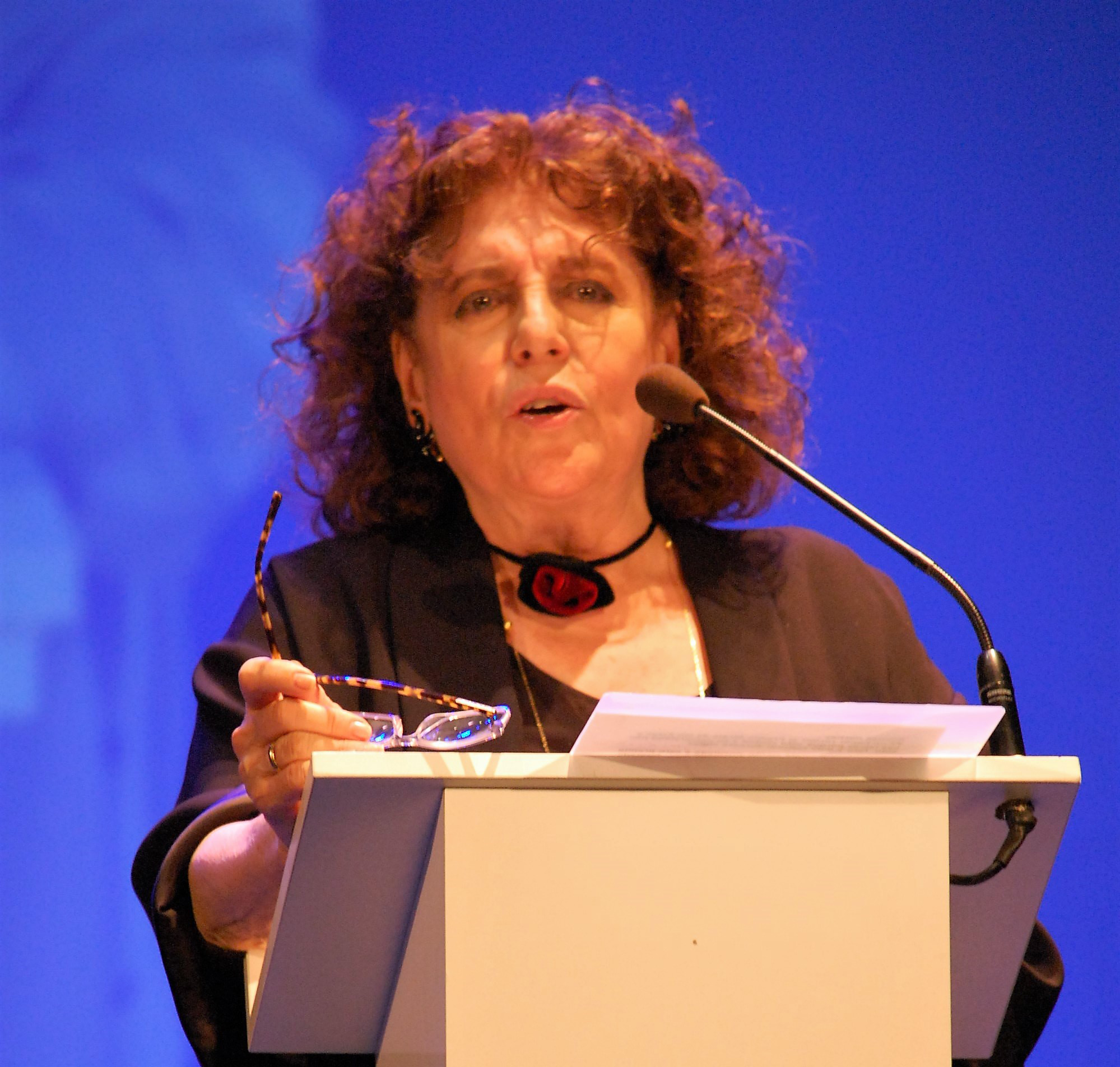
- López in 2021
- Born: María del Rosario López Piñuelas; 28 October 1943 (age 82); Salamanca, Spain

María del Rosario López Piñuelas (born 28 October 1943) better known as Charo López, is a Spanish actress.

== Filmography ==
- Plan Jack cero tres (1967)
- El hueso (1967)
- La vida sigue igual (1969)
- Ditirambo (1969)
- El extraño caso del doctor Fausto (1969)
- Pastel de sangre (1971)
- Me enveneno de azules (1971)
- El bandido Malpelo (1971)
- El sol bajo la tierra (1972)
- The Guerrilla (1973)
- Don Yllán, el mágico de Toledo (1973)
- Leyenda del alcalde de Zalamea, La (1973)
- Las estrellas están verdes (1973)
- La regenta (1974) directed by Gonzalo Suárez
- Unmarried Mothers (1975)
- La Raulito en libertad (1975)
- Largo retorno (1975)
- Las cuatro novias de Augusto Pérez (1976)
- Manuela (1976)
- El límite del amor (1976)
- Ah sì? E io lo dico a Zzzzorro! (1976)
- Luto riguroso (1977)
- Parranda (1977)
- Los placeres ocultos (1977)
- Der Tiefstapler (1978)
- Adiós, querida mamá (1980)
- Historias de mujeres (1980)
- El gran secreto (1980)
- Tres mujeres de hoy (1980)
- Anima - Symphonie phantastique (1981)
- De camisa vieja a chaqueta nueva (1982)
- Adulterio nacional (1982)
- La colmena (1982) directed by Mario Camus
- L'Home ronyó, (1983)
- Atrapado (1983)
- Interior roig (1983)
- Zama (1984)
- Epílogo (1984)
- Últimos tardes con Teresa (1984)
- Crimen en familia (1985)
- La Vieja música (1985)
- Los paraísos perdidos (1985)
- Tiempo de silencio (1986)
- El rey del mambo (1989)
- Cómo levantar 1000 kilos (1991)
- Lo más natural (1991)
- Don Juan de los infiernos (1991)
- La fiebre del oro (1993)
- Kika (1993) directed by Pedro Almodóvar
- El día nunca, por la tarde (1994)
- El detective y la muerte (1994)
- Pasajes (1996)
- Secrets of the heart (1997) directed by Montxo Armendáriz
- Plenilunio (1999) directed by Imanol Uribe
- Tiempos de azúcar (2001) directed by Juan Luis Iborra
- La soledad era esto (2002) with Kira Miró
- Nudos (2003) with Goya Toledo, Héctor Alterio, Santi Millán and Terele Pávez
- Las llaves de la independencia (2005) with Yohana Cobo
- Habitación en alquiler (2006)

== Television ==
- Fortunata y Jacinta (1980)
- Los gozos y las sombras (1982)
- Los pazos de Ulloa (1985)

== Theatre ==
- Tengamos el sexo en paz (2006-now)
- El infierno (2005)
- Las memorias de Sarah Bernhardt (2003)
- Los puentes de Madison (2002)
- Tengamos el sexo en paz (1995–1999)
- Carcajada salvaje (1994–1995)
- Hay que deshacer la casa (1988)
- Una jornada particular (1987)
- Los lunáticos (¿?)
- La marquesa Rosalinda (¿?)
- El condenado por desconfiado (¿?)
- La paz (¿?)

== Awards ==
- Goya Award for best supporting actress in Secrets of the heart (1997)
- Oso de Plata for the best actress in the Berlin Festival (1983)
- Golden India Catalina for the best supporting actress in Secrets of the heart (1998)
- Fotogramas de Plata for the best theatre actress (1997)
- Award of the Spanish Actors Union for the best supporting performance (1998)
- Nacho Martinez award at the Gijón International Film Festival (2010)
