= Carmen Conesa =

Spanish actress

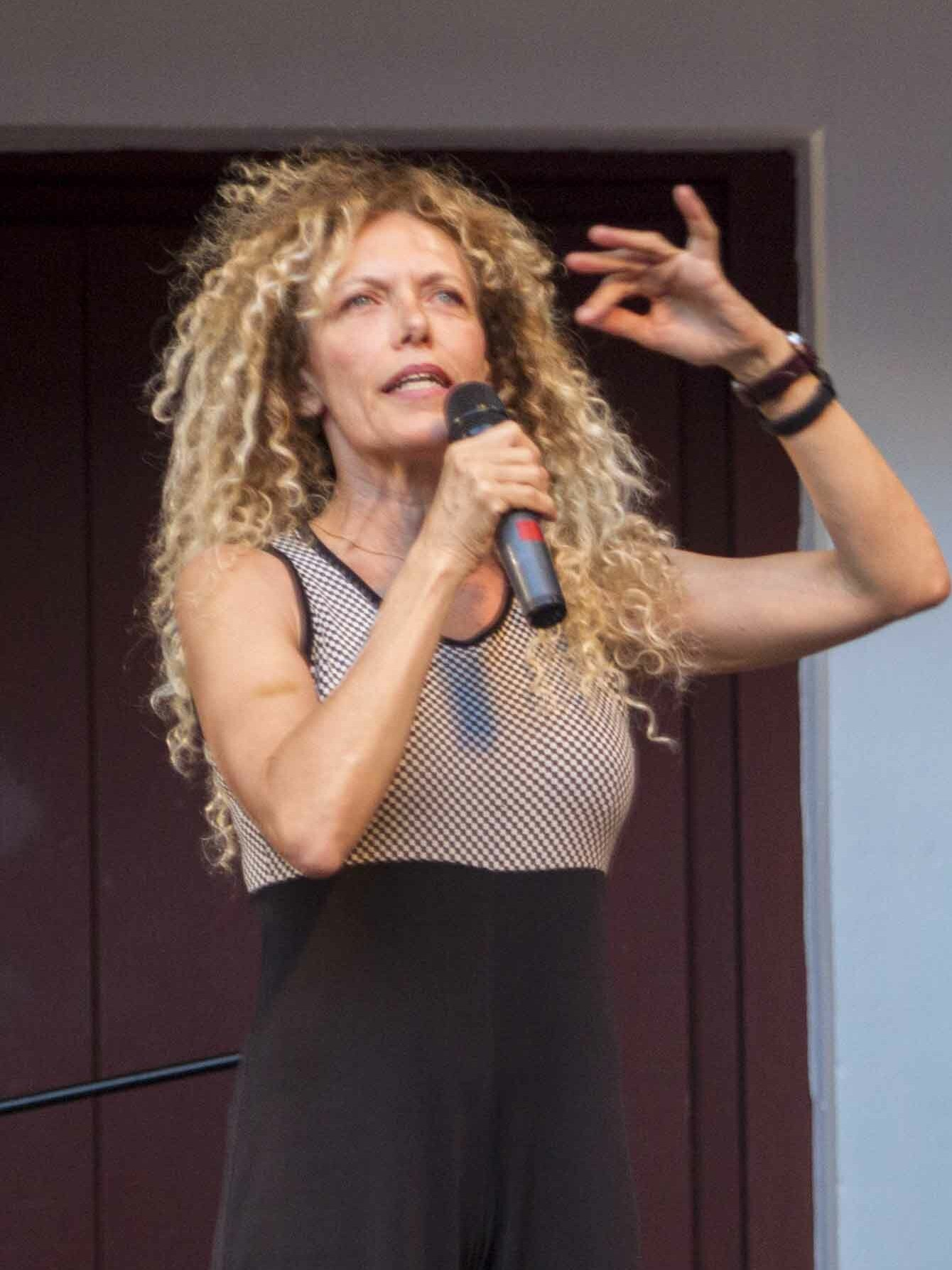
- Conesa in 2018
- Born: Carmen Conesa Hernández; 15 September 1960 (age 64); Barcelona, Spain
- Other names: Carme Conesa
- Occupation(s): Actress, painter, singer

Carmen Conesa Hernández (born 15 September 1960) is a Spanish actress, singer, and painter. She gained notoriety for her performance in Las chicas de hoy en día (1991–92).

== Life and career ==
Carmen Conesa Hernández was born in Barcelona on 15 September 1960. Her mother was voice actress Matilde Conesa. She trained at the Real Academia de Bellas Artes de San Fernando. She gained notoriety to a television audience for her performance alongside Diana Peñalver in Las chicas de hoy en día. She has since featured in television series such as La señora, Com si fos ahir Amar es para siempre, and Merlí: Sapere Aude.

Her film credits include performances in The Knight of the Dragon, Cómo ser mujer y no morir en el intento, Uptown, The Longest Night, Makinavaja, and Father There Is Only One 3. Her stage work include performances in musical plays.

== Accolades ==
Year	Award	Category	Work	Result	Ref.
1992	42nd Fotogramas de Plata	Best Television Actress	Las chicas de hoy en día	Won	
2010	19th Actors and Actresses Union Awards	Best Television Actress in a Secondary Role	La señora	Won	
2011	20th Actors and Actresses Union Awards	Best Stage Actress in a Secondary Role	Beaumarchais	Nominated	
