= Gonzalo Suárez =

Spanish writer, screenwriter and film director (1934–2026)

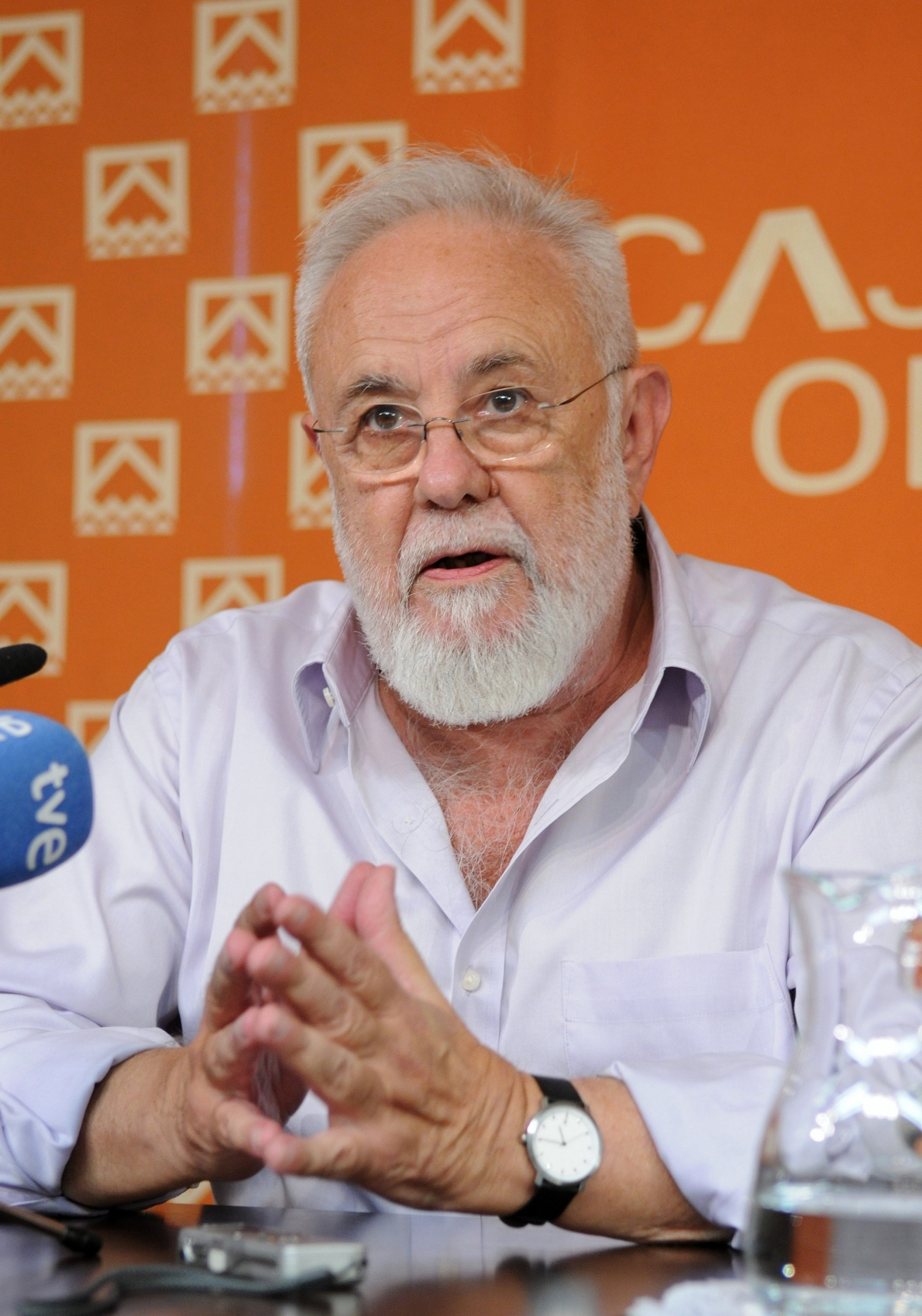
- Suárez in 2011
- Born: Gonzalo Suárez Morilla; 30 July 1934; Oviedo, Spain
- Died: 29 September 2026 (aged 92); Madrid, Spain
- Occupations: Writer, film director, screenwriter
- Years active: 1966–2026
- Children: 4
- Relatives: Carlos Suárez (brother)

Gonzalo Suárez Morilla (30 July 1934 – 29 September 2026) was a Spanish writer, screenwriter and film director.

== Career ==
In 1963 he published his first novel De cuerpo presente. His 1975 film The Regent's Wife was entered into the 9th Moscow International Film Festival. His 1991 film Don Juan in Hell was entered into the 17th Moscow International Film Festival.

In 1984 he acted as the married writer in Pedro Almodóvar's ¿Qué he hecho yo para merecer esto? (What Have I Done to Deserve This?).

In 1985 he directed Los pazos de Ulloa for Televisión Española.

At Gijón International Film Festival in 2003, he received the Nacho Martínez Award.

== Personal life and death ==
His younger brother was the cinematographer Carlos Suárez, who collaborated with Gonzalo in many of his films. He had four children with Hélène Girard, including the sinologist Anne-Hélène Suárez and the video game developer Gonzo Suárez.

Suárez died at his home in Madrid, on 29 September 2026, at the age of 92.

== Filmography ==
Year	Film	Main cast
2007	Oviedo Express	Barbara Goenaga, Carmelo Gómez, Najwa Nimri, Jorge Sanz
2002	El candidato	no data available
2000	El portero	Maribel Verdú, Carmelo Gómez, Antonio Resines, Elvira Mínguez, Roberto Álvarez
1995	Mi nombre es sombra	Francois-Eric Gendron, Amparo Larrañaga, Ernesto Alterio
1994	El detective y la muerte	Maria de Medeiros, Javier Bardem, Héctor Alterio, Charo López, Mapi Galán
1992	La reina anónima	Carmen Maura, Marisa Paredes, Juanjo Puigcorbé
1991	Don Juan en los infiernos	Fernando Guillén, Carmen Maura, Héctor Alterio, Olegar Fedoro
1990	El lado oscuro del deseo	Héctor Alterio, Hugo Gorban
1988	Remando al viento	Virginia Mataix, José Luis Gómez, Hugh Grant, Valentine Pelka, Lizzy McInnerny, Elizabeth Hurley
1984	Epílogo	Francisco Rabal, José Sacristán, Charo López, Sonia Martínez, Chus Lampreave
1979	Cuentos para una escapada	José Luis Borau, Chus Lampreave, Carmen Santonja
1977	Reina Zanahoria	Fernando Fernán Gómez
1977	Parranda	José Sacristán, Antonio Ferrandis, Fernando Fernán Gómez
1976	Beatriz	Jorge Rivero, José Sacristán, Carmen Sevilla
1975	The Regent's Wife	
1974	La loba y la paloma	Carmen Sevilla, Donald Pleasence
1973	Al diablo con el amor (A)	Ana Belén, Victor Manuel, Luis Ciges
1972	Morbo	Ana Belén, Victor Manuel
1970	Aoom	Lex Barker, Teresa Gimpera, Fernando Rey
1969	El extraño caso del doctor Fausto (A)	Alberto Puig, Olga Vidali
1969	Ditirambo (A)	Lou Bennett, Ángel Carmona, Francesc Català Roca
1967	Ditirambo vela por nosotros (A)	Marianne Bennett, Bill Dyckes, Silvia Suárez
1966	El horrible ser nunca visto (A)	Francisco Balcells, Silvia Suárez

- (A) he appears as actor in small role
