= Butterfly Wings (film) =

1991 Spanish film by Juanma Bajo Ulloa

- Theatrical release poster
- Spanish: Alas de mariposa
- Directed by: Juanma Bajo Ulloa
- Written by: Juanma Bajo Ulloa; Eduardo Bajo Ulloa
- Starring: Sílvia Munt; Fernando Valverde; Susana García; Laura Vaquero
- Cinematography: Aitor Mantxola; Enric Daví
- Edited by: Pablo Blanco
- Music by: Bingen Mendizábal
- Release dates: September 1991 (Zinemaldia); 18 October 1991 (Spain)
- Running time: 1h 48min
- Country: Spain
- Language: Spanish

Butterfly Wings (Spanish: Alas de mariposa) is a 1991 Spanish drama film directed by Juanma Bajo Ulloa.

== Plot ==
A poor couple wants to have a boy but instead they get a girl, Ami. A male son is born afterwards but Ami kills the newborn, straining the relationship between mother and daughter.

== Cast ==
- Sílvia Munt as Carmen
- Tito Valverde as Gabriel
- Susana García Díez as Ami
- Laura Vaquero as Ami niña
- Txema Blasco as Alejandro
- Alberto Martín as Gorka

== Release ==
The film screened at the 39th San Sebastián International Film Festival in September 1991. It was released theatrically on 18 October 1991.

== Accolades ==
Year	Award	Category	Nominee(s)	Result	Ref.
1991	39th San Sebastián International Film Festival	Golden Shell		Won	
1992	6th Goya Awards	Best New Director	Juanma Bajo Ulloa	Won	
1992	6th Goya Awards	Best Original Screenplay	Juanma Bajo Ulloa, Eduardo Bajo Ulloa	Won	
1992	6th Goya Awards	Best Actress	Sílvia Munt	Won	

== See also ==
- List of Spanish films of 1991
