= Makinavaja, el último choriso =

- Theatrical release poster
- Directed by: Carlos Suárez
- Screenplay by: Carlos Suárez
- Based on: the original characters by Ramon Tosas "Ivà"
- Starring: Andrés Pajares; Jesús Bonilla; Mario Pardo; Pedro Reyes; Mary Santpere; Carmen Conesa
- Cinematography: Carlos Suárez; Francesc Brualla
- Edited by: Guillermo Maldonado
- Music by: Luis Mendo; Bernardo Fuster
- Production companies: Tesauro; Dos Ocho Cine; Tamaya PC
- Distributed by: Manuel Salvador S.A.
- Release date: 8 May 1992
- Country: Spain
- Language: Spanish

Makinavaja, el último choriso is a 1992 Spanish crime comedy film directed by Carlos Suárez based on the comics by Ivà. It stars Andrés Pajares as the title character alongside Jesús Bonilla, Mario Pardo, Pedro Reyes, Mary Santpere, and Carmen Conesa.

== Plot ==
The plot follows the mishaps of two clumsy low-key criminals (Makinavaja and Popeye) in El Raval, Barcelona.

== Cast ==
- Andrés Pajares as Makinavaja
- Jesús Bonilla as Popeye
- Pedro Reyes as El Pirata
- Mario Pardo as Mohamed
- Llàtzer Escarceller as Matías
- Alberto Pérez as Pitufo
- Mary Santpere as La Maru
- Carmen Conesa as Toti

== Production ==
The film was produced by Tesauro, Dos Ocho Cine, and Tamaya PC.

== Release ==
The film was the only Spanish picture among the 30 highest-grossing releases in Spain from January to October 1992.

== Reception ==
Casimiro Torreiro of El País observed a "vocation for transgression", not implying, "unfortunately, success when it comes to transgressing", with the result from the adaptation leaving "ample room for doubt", with none of the performers (bar possibly Santpere) seemingly believing a lot in what they are doing.

== See also ==
- List of Spanish films of 1992
