= Carmen Rico Godoy =

Spanish writer, journalist and feminist

- Born: Carmen Rico Carabias; 30 August 1939; Paris, France
- Died: 12 September 2001 (aged 62); Madrid, Spain
- Occupations: Writer, journalist, political scientist
- Spouse: Andrés Vicente Gómez
- Children: José Manuel Garasino Rico (deceased)

Carmen Rico Carabias known as Carmen Rico Godoy (30 August 1939 – 12 September 2001) was a Spanish writer, journalist and feminist.

== Life ==
Godoy was born in Paris in 1939 to exiled journalist Josefina Carrabias. In 1944, her family returned to Madrid, where she lived for eight years. When she was 16, she began to study political science at Georgetown University, where she received her bachelors' degree in 1958. In 1967 she moved to Argentina, where she stayed until 1971, when she moved back to Madrid, and became one of the first members of the newspaper Cambio16.

== Works ==
=== Novels ===
- Cómo ser mujer y no morir en el intento (English: How to be a woman and not die trying) (1990)
- Cómo ser infeliz y disfrutarlo (English: How to be unhappy and enjoy it)(1991)
- Cuernos de mujer (English: Horns of a woman)(1992)
- La costilla asada de Adán (English: The barbecued rib of Adam) (1996)
- Cortados, solos y con (mala) leche (1999)
- Fin de Fiesta (2001)

=== Essays ===
- La neurona iconoclasta.
- Bajo el ficus de La Moncloa.
- Tres mujeres.

=== Screenplays ===
- (1988) Miss Caribe, of Fernando Colomo
- (1991) Cómo ser mujer y no morir en el intento (adaptation of her novel of the same name), of Ana Belén
- (1994) Cómo ser infeliz y disfrutarlo (adaptation of her novel of the same name), of Enrique Urbizu.
- (2000) El paraíso ya no es lo que era, of Francesc Betriu

== Awards ==
- 1997 – Francisco Cerecedo Journalism Award of the Association of European journalists.
