= Carlos Suárez (cinematographer) =

Spanish cinematographer (1946–2019)

Carlos Suárez (1946 – 19 October 2019) was a Spanish cinematographer who worked in various movies like Oviedo Express, Dagon, El Portero, Don Juan en los infiernos and El detective y la muerte.

He was the younger brother of film director Gonzalo Suarez, with whom he collaborated several times. He occasionally acted in movies like La Raza Nunca Pierde - Huele a Gas and Guyana: Cult of the Damned and was the director and writer for The Secret Garden, a 1984 movie. He was the winner of the 1988 Goya Award for Best Cinematography for the film Remando al viento (Rowing with the Wind).

== Awards and nominations ==
Goya Awards
Category	Year	Film	Result	Ref
Best cinematographer	2008	La conjura de El Escorial	Nominated	
Best cinematographer	2007	Oviedo Express	Nominated	
Best cinematographer	1991	Don Juan en los infiernos	Nominated	
Best cinematographer	1988	Remando al viento	Won	

== Filmography ==
Year	Film	Director	Writer	Producer	Notes
1969	Gladiadores del siglo XX	Yes	Yes	No	Documentary short film Co-directed with Joaquín Lledo
1973	Al Diablo, con amor	No	Yes	No	
1984	El Jardín Secreto	Yes	Yes	No	
1992	Makinavaja, el último choriso	Yes	Yes	Yes	Based on the Makinavaja comics
1993	¡¡Semos peligrosos!! (useasé Makinavaja 2)	Yes	Yes	Yes	Based on the Makinavaja comics
1996	Adios, Tiburón	Yes	Yes	No	
1996	Los Porretas	Yes	Yes	No	
