= Juanma Bajo Ulloa =

Basque Spanish film director

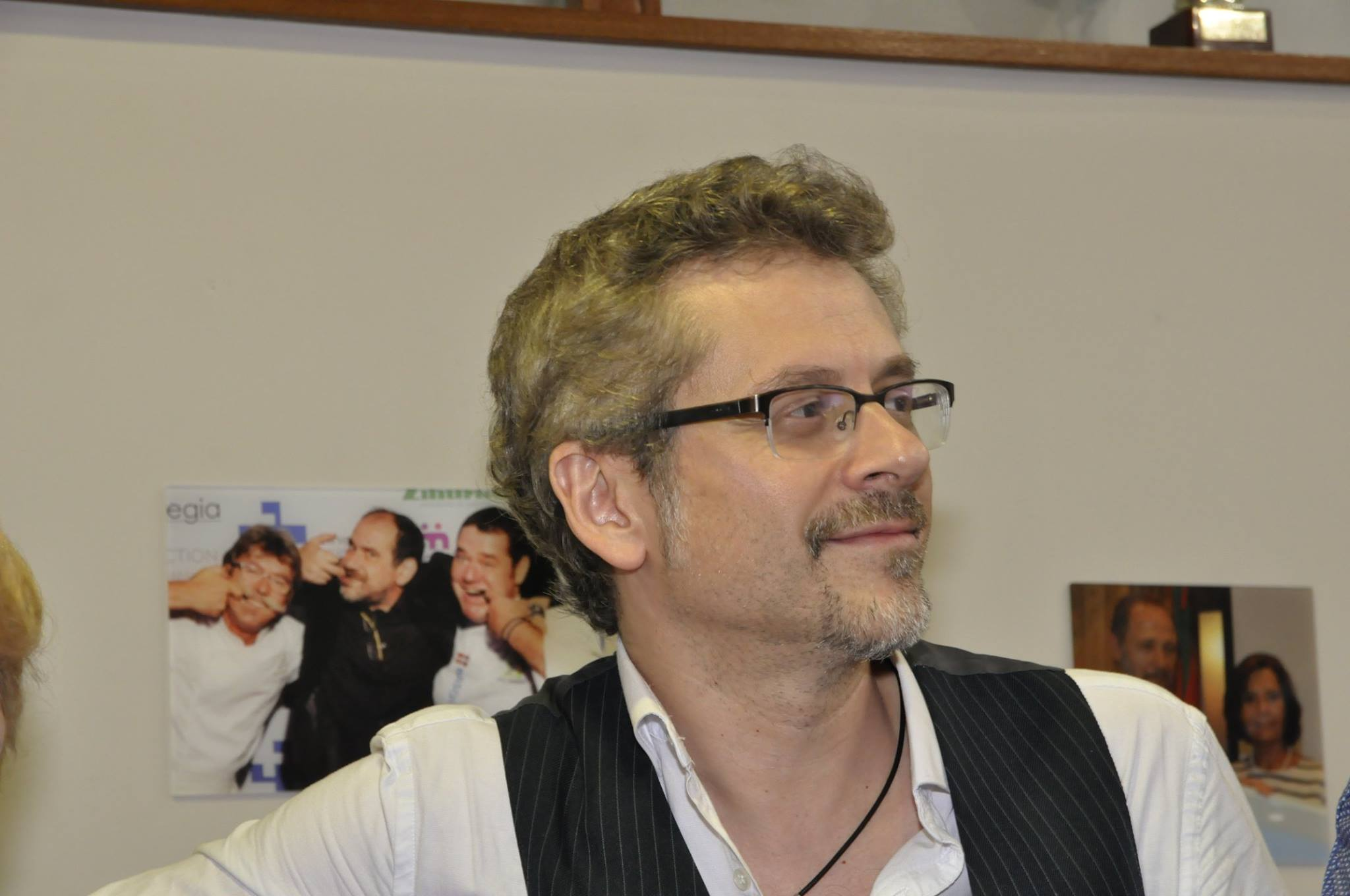
- At the San Sebastián Film Festival
- Born: Juan Manuel Bajo Ulloa; 1 January 1967 (age 59); Vitoria-Gasteiz, Álava, Spain
- Occupations: Film director; music video director

Juan Manuel Bajo Ulloa (born 1 January 1967) is a Spanish film director.

== Biography ==
Juanma Bajo Ulloa was born in Vitoria-Gasteiz, Álava, on 1 January 1967. His parents mortgaged their house to fund Bajo Ulloa's film beginnings. His first feature film Alas de Mariposa (1991) earned the Golden Shell at the San Sebastián Film Festival. With the money earned with that movie he produced his second one, La Madre Muerta, which is a good example of his baroque style, combining a perfect technique with the atmosphere of an almost sinister fairy tale. His third movie, Airbag (1997), was a huge box office success, becoming the highest-grossing film in the history of Spanish cinema (the record was beaten however a year later by Torrente, el brazo tonto de la ley).

Since 1994 he has directed and produced music videos for Joaquín Sabina, Los Enemigos, and Barricada, and others.

== Filmography ==
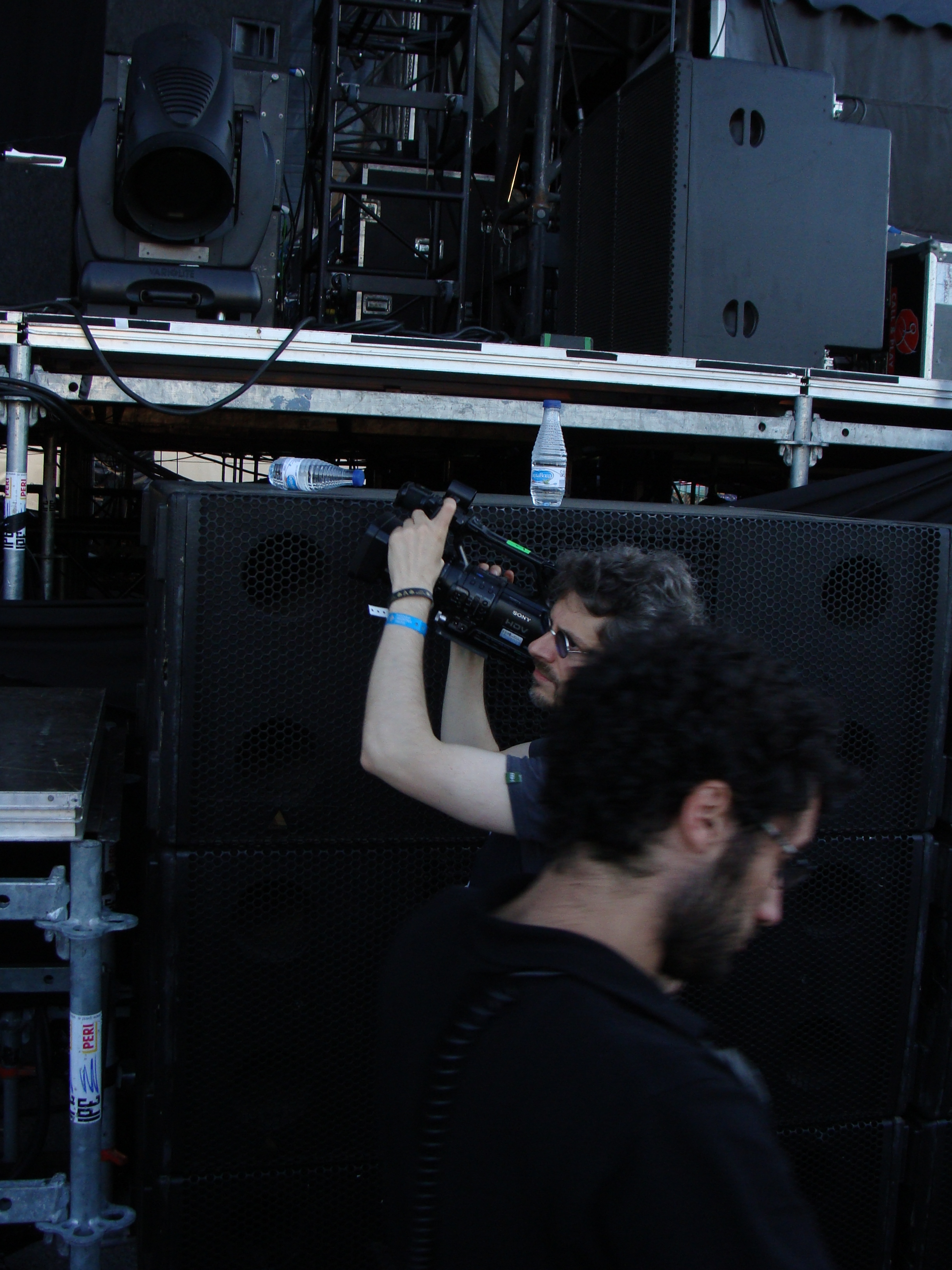
Bajo Ulloa in 2011, shooting footage during the Azkena Rock Festival.

Feature films

- Alas de mariposa (1991)
- La madre muerta (1993)
- Airbag (1997)
- Frágil (2004)
- Rey gitano (2015)
- Baby (2020)
- El mal (2025)

Short films

- Cruza la Puerta (1984)
- El Último Payaso (1985) 1985
- A Kien Puede Interesar (1986) 1986
- Cien Aviones de Papel (1987) 1987
- Akixo (1988)
- El Reino de Víctor (1989)
- Ordinary Americans (1999)

== Awards and nominations ==
| Year | Award | Category | Work | Result | Ref. |
|---|---|---|---|---|---|
| 1990 | 4th Goya Awards | Best Short Film | El reino de Víctor | Won | |
| 1991 | 39th San Sebastián Film Festival | Golden Shell | Alas de mariposa | Won | |
| 1992 | 6th Goya Awards | Best New Director | Alas de mariposa | Won | |
| 1992 | 6th Goya Awards | Best Original Screenplay (nominated alongside Eduardo Bajo Ulloa) | Alas de mariposa | Won | |
| 1993 | 17th Montreal World Film Festival | Best Director | La Madre Muerta | Won | |
| 1994 | 8th Goya Awards | Best Director | La Madre Muerta | Nominated | |

- Award Opera Prima and Audience in the Seattle International Film Festival
- New York Film Critics Association Award to best Opera Prima.
- Best movie, Stockholm Film Festival for La Madre Muerta
- Best movie, Fantasporto (Portugal) for La Madre Muerta
