= List of Spanish films of 1980 =

A list of Spanish-produced and co-produced feature films released in Spain in 1980.

== Films ==
Title	Cast & Crew	Ref.
Rapture (Arrebato)	Director: Iván Zulueta Cast: Eusebio Poncela, Cecilia Roth, Will More	
Dedicatoria	Director: Jaime Chávarri Cast: José Luis Gómez, Amparo Muñoz, Patricia Adriani	
F.E.N.	Director: Antonio Hernández Cast: Héctor Alterio, José Luis López Vázquez	
Memoirs of Leticia Valle (Memorias de Leticia Valle)	Director: Miguel Ángel Rivas Cast: Emma Suárez	
Elisita	Director: Juan Caño Arecha Cast: Nicolas De Santis, Lola Gaos	
Gary Cooper, Who Art in Heaven (Gary Cooper, que estás en los cielos)	Director: Pilar Miró Cast: Mercedes Sampietro, Jon Finch, Carmen Maura, Agustín González, Mary Carrillo	
Girl with the Golden Panties (La muchacha de las bragas de oro)	Director: Vicente Aranda Cast: Victoria Abril	
The Nest (El nido)	Director: Jaime de Armiñán Cast: Héctor Alterio, Ana Torrent	
Ópera prima	Director: Fernando Trueba Cast: Óscar Ladoire, Paula Molina	
Navajeros	Director: Eloy de la Iglesia Cast: José Luis Manzano, José Sacristán, María Martín, Isela Vega, Enrique San Francisco	
Pepi, Luci, Bom and Other Girls on the Heap (Pepi, Luci, Bom y otras chicas del montón)	Director: Pedro Almodóvar Cast: Félix Rotaeta	
Spoiled Children (Hijos de papá)	Director: Rafael Gil Cast: Irene Gutiérrez Caba, José Bódalo, Florinda Chico, Blanca Estrada, Ana Obregón, Fernando Sancho, Agustín González	
Los fieles sirvientes	Director: Francesc Betriu Cast: Amparo Soler Leal, Francisco Algora, María Isbert, José Vivó, Pilar Bayona	
El hombre de moda	Director: Fernando Méndez-Leite Cast: Xabier Elorriaga, Marilina Ross, Maite Blasco, Walter Vidarte, Carmen Maura, Isabel Mestres, Alicia Sánchez, Francisco Merino, Luis Politti, Antonio Drove, Pep Munné, Isabel Luque, Eduardo Calvo	
