= Tango Feroz =

1993 Argentinian film

Tango Feroz: La leyenda de Tanguito
- Cover art for the original soundtrack of the film
- Directed by: Marcelo Piñeyro
- Written by: Aída Bortnik; Marcelo Piñeyro
- Produced by: Katrina Bayonas; Claudio Pustelnik
- Starring: Fernan Mirás; Cecilia Dopazo
- Cinematography: Alfredo F. Mayo
- Edited by: Miguel Pérez
- Music by: Osvaldo Montes; David Lebón
- Production companies: National Institute of Cinema and Audiovisual Arts (INCAA); Mandala Films; Kuranda Films
- Distributed by: Mundial Films
- Release date: June 3, 1993 (Buenos Aires)
- Running time: 130 minutes
- Countries: Argentina; Spain
- Language: Spanish
- Box office: $4.2 million (Argentina)

Tango Feroz: la leyenda de Tanguito (Spanish: Wild tango: the legend of Tanguito) is a 1993 Argentine drama musical film directed by Marcelo Piñeyro, his debut film. It is loosely based in the life of Tanguito, one of the first artists of Argentine rock ("Tanguito" is just a stage name, neither the artist nor the movie are related with Tango music). Fernan Mirás and Cecilia Dopazo, unknown to most spectators by that point, had the lead roles and became famous after the film's release. It was the most successful Argentinian movie of all time.

Tango Feroz centers on Tanguito's drug addiction, his love relationship with Mariana, his friendship with Mauricio "Moris" Birabent, his madness and final years. The film does not include any of the songs written by the real Tanguito, such as his iconic "La balsa", as Piñeyro could not acquire the rights for doing so. Instead, it uses many other classic songs of Argentine Rock. Ulises Butrón sang the hit song written for the movie, "El amor es más fuerte" (Spanish: Love is stronger), in the scenes played by Mirás as well as the soundtrack.

== Cast ==
- Fernán Mirás as Tanguito
- Cecilia Dopazo as Mariana
- David Masajnik as Ruso
- Imanol Arias as Ángel
- Cristina Banegas as Mariana's mother
- Antonio Birabent as Mauricio 'Moris' Birabent
- Leonardo Sbaraglia as Pedro
- Federico D'Elía
- Héctor Alterio as Lobo
- Ernesto Alterio
- Carola Molina
- Humberto Serrano
- Mirna Suárez

== Reception ==
In its opening weekend, Tango Feroz grossed $249,111 from 45,203 admissions at seven screens in Buenos Aires, the biggest Argentine opener of the last 10 years. The film grossed $4,225,000 in Argentina, a record for an Argentinian film at the time, and was the second highest-grossing for the year behind Jurassic Park with $4.6 million.

== Awards ==
Tango Feroz won the 1994 Argentinian Film Critics Association Awards for Best First Film and Best Music. It was also nominated as Best Film, but didn't get the award. Marcelo Piñeyro also won the 1993 Torino International Film Festival of Young Cinema in the International Feature Film Competition, and got the second place at the 1993 Havana Film Festival.
