= No eres tú, soy yo (disambiguation) =

No eres tú, soy yo is a 2010 Mexican film by Alejandro Springall.

No eres tú, soy yo (Spanish for "it's not you, it's me") may also refer to:

- "No eres tú soy yo", a song by María Becerra featuring Danny Ocean from Animal
- "No eres tú (soy yo)", a song by Kali Uchis from Sin miedo (del amor y otros demonios)
- "No eres tú, soy yo", a lyric from 2017 song "Échame la culpa"

== See also ==
- No sos vos, soy yo, a 2004 film by Juan Taratuto
