= Aída Bortnik =

Argentine screenwriter

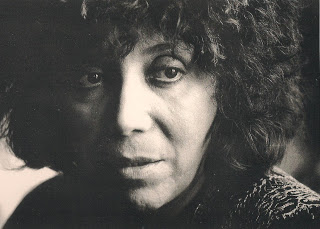

Aída Bortnik (7 January 1938 – 27 April 2013) was an Argentine screenwriter, nominated for an Academy Award for her work in the film La historia oficial (1985). She has the notable distinction of having written the screenplay for both the first Argentine film nominated for an Academy Award (The Truce, 1974) and the first Argentine film to win an Academy Award (La historia oficial).

== Career ==
After starting out as a TV-screenwriter in 1971, Bortnik co-wrote with débutant director Sergio Renán the screenplay for The Truce (1974), based on the eponymous novel by Mario Benedetti. It was the first Argentine film to be nominated for an Academy Award (the Academy Award for Best Foreign Language Film) in 1975, but lost out to Federico Fellini's Amarcord. That year, Bortnik co-wrote Una mujer, directed by Juan José Stagnaro. After a three-year break, Bortnik worked one more time with Renán in writing a screenplay in 1977 for Haroldo Conti's novel, Crecer de golpe. She then co-wrote La isla (1979) with director Alejandro Doria.

In 1985, Bortnik co-wrote with writer-director Luis Puenzo a screenplay for a film about the Argentine Dirty War, which had recently ceased. The film denounced the atrocities of the military regime and made the brutal dictatorships known worldwide. The film won the Academy Award for Best Foreign Language Film in 1986, and earned Bortnik a nomination for Best Writing, Screenplay Written Directly for the Screen, shared with Puenzo. That same year, she co-wrote Pobre mariposa with director Raúl de la Torre. In 1989, Bortnik helped Puenzo write the screenplay for Carlos Fuentes' novel Old Gringo, a United States production; the only non-Argentine project in which Bortnik was involved.

During the 90s, Bortnik worked strictly with newcomer writer/director Marcelo Piñeyro, who had served as executive produced to La historia oficial. Bortnik helped Piñeyro write the screenplays for Tango feroz: la leyenda de Tanguito (1993), Caballos salvajes (1995) and Cenizas del Paraíso (1997), a loose trilogy. She renewed her working relationship with Sergio Renán, co-writing La soledad era esto (2002). Her last work was as an occasional writer for the series Vientos de agua in 2006.
