= Alfredo F. Mayo =

Argentine cinematographer

Alfredo F. Mayo is a Spanish born film cinematographer who has also been credited as Alfredo Fernández Mayo and Alfredo Mayo.

Early in his career, Mayo worked with many different directors, on less well-known films. In 1991 he won the renowned Goya Award for Best Cinematography in Las cartas de Alou (released 1990). He would be nominated twice more for the Goya (El Maestro de esgrima in 1992 and El Misterio Galíndez in 2003), but did not win it again.

1991 he filmed for Pedro Almodóvar's Tacones lejanos (High Heels); the two worked together again on Kika (1993). At this time he also started to film for Marcelo Piñeyro, for Caballos Salvajes; Mayo went on to be the cinematographer with whom Piñeyro worked in all films that he directed alone (i.e. except Historias de Argentina en vivo), including the critically well-received Plata quemada (2000) and Kamchatka (2002).

Further collaborations were with director Gerardo Herrero, for whom Mayo filmed all ten films that Herrero made from 1994 until 2006, when Mayo made his last film as of October 2007. Mayo also worked with Fernando León de Aranoa on three occasions (Barrio in 1998, Familia in 1996, and award-winning Los lunes al sol in 2002).

== Awards and nominations ==
Apart from the Goya Award for Best Cinematography in Las Cartas de Alou (1991) and the two further Goya nominations, Mayo won three Argentine Film Critics Association Awards ("Silver Condors") for the Piñeyro films Cenizas del paraíso (1998), Plata quemada (2001) and Kamchatka (2003).

He received three CEC Awards from the Cinema Writers Circle Awards, Spain, El Maestro de esgrima (1993), El Aliento del diablo (1994), and Cuando vuelvas a mi lado (2000). In 2003, he was again nominated for the award for Los Lunes al sol.

In addition, he won an award for Best Cinematography each in Cuando vuelvas a mi lado 1999 at the San Sebastián International Film Festival, and in Plata quemada 2001 at the Havana Film Festival.

== Filmography (partial) ==
- Tacones lejanos (1991) a.k.a. High Heels
- Women (1997)
- Las razones de mis amigos (2000) a.k.a. Friends Have Reasons
- Almejas y mejillones (2000) Clams and Mussels
- Adiós con el corazón (2000) a.k.a. Goodbye from the Heart
- Plata quemada (2000) Burnt Money
- Antigua vida mía (2001) a.k.a. Antigua, My Life
- Kamchatka (2002)
- Los lunes al sol (2002) Mondays in the Sun
- El lugar donde estuvo el paraíso (2002) a.k.a. The Place That Was Paradise
- El misterio Galíndez (2003) a.k.a. The Galíndez File
- El principio de Arquímedes (2004) a.k.a. The Archimedes Principle
- El Método (2005)
- Heroína (2005)
- Los aires difíciles (2006) a.k.a. Rough Winds
- Una rosa de Francia (2006)
