= El Capitán Trueno y el Santo Grial =

- Theatrical release poster
- Directed by: Antonio Hernández
- Written by: Pau Vergara
- Based on: El Capitán Trueno characters by Víctor Mora
- Starring: Sergio Peris-Mencheta; Natasha Yarovenko; Manuel Martínez; Adrián Lamana; Jennifer Rope; Gary Piquer; Asier Etxeandia; Ramón Langa; Roberto Álvarez
- Production companies: Maltés Producciones; Sorolla Films
- Distributed by: Buena Vista International
- Release date: 7 October 2011
- Country: Spain
- Language: Spanish
- Budget: €8.39 million
- Box office: €0.74 million

El Capitán Trueno y el Santo Grial is a 2011 Spanish sword and sorcery film directed by Antonio Hernández and based on the comic books of El Capitán Trueno. Its stars Sergio Peris-Mencheta and Natasha Yarovenko. The film suffered from problems since its development phase and proved to be a box office failure, also earning very poor reviews.

== Plot ==
The fiction follows the adventures of the Capitán Trueno and his band, formed by Crispín, Goliat and the princess Sigrid.

== Cast ==
- Sergio Peris-Mencheta as Capitán Trueno
- Natasha Yarovenko as Sigrid
- Gary Piquer as sir Black
- Manolo Martínez as Goliat
- Adrián Lamana as Crispín
- Asier Etxeandia as Hassan
- Alejandro Jornet as Morgano
- Jennifer Rope
- Roberto Álvarez
- Ramón Langa as Al Kathara

== Production ==
Earlier failed attempts to bring the comic book character to a live action film involved Juan Piquer Simón, Juanma Bajo Ulloa, Alejandro Toledo and Daniel Calparsoro as possible directors. None of them came to fruition and, following the entry of Pau Vergara in the project (as producer and tentative director), the direction was eventually tasked to Antonio Hernández.

At some point Álex González and Elsa Pataky were slated to star as lead characters Capitán Trueno and Sigrid but they left the project. Natasha Yarovenko (originally set to perform a villain role) was subsequently recast to perform the role of Sigrid. Sergio Peris-Mencheta also came in as Capitán Trueno.

Produced by Sorolla Films and Maltés Producciones, filming started on 16 August 2010. Shooting locations included El Escorial, Baños de la Encina (Jaén), Aldea del Rey (Ciudad Real), Lagunas de Ruidera (Albacete), the cave of Las Palomas in Yátova, the Turche Cave in Buñol, Abantos, Chulilla and the Ahuir Beach in Gandía (Valencia), the Saladar d'Aigua Amarga beach in Elche and the Ciudad de la Luz film studio in Alicante. Shooting wrapped in November 2010.

The film had a budget of €8.39 million.

== Release ==
No member of the cast attended the presentation of the movie in Valencia on 5 October 2011, leaving producer Pau Vergara alone. Vergara was credited as the single screenwriter, but Peris-Mencheta claimed Vergara was opportunistic ("tiene un morro que te cagas" [sic]) and that the screenplay should be credited to the director too. Days later, Peris-Mencheta attacked Vergara in Twitter, stating "may Pau Vergara pay what he owes and stay away from Spanish cinema forever".

Distributed by Walt Disney España, the film was theatrically released on 7 October 2011.

The film grossed €739,162 and 118,749 viewers.

== Reception ==
The film earned very poor reviews. Reviewing for El País, Javier Ocaña titled his review as deforme insensatez ('warped foolishness'), noting that the "direction of actors is simply nonexistent", positively comparing leading actor Peris-Mencheta to the rest of the cast ("at least he does not take risks"). Even the president of the Academy of Cinematographic Arts and Sciences of Spain (Enrique González Macho) raised his opinion on the matter, deeming the film to be a 'drag' (pestiño). The film was presented in media as "the biggest fiasco of Spanish cinema".

== See also ==
- List of Spanish films of 2011
