= Women on the Edge =

Women on the Edge may refer to:

- Women on the Edge (1929 film), a German silent drama film
- Women on the Edge (2023 film), a comedy film
