= Daniel Kuzniecka =

Argentine actor

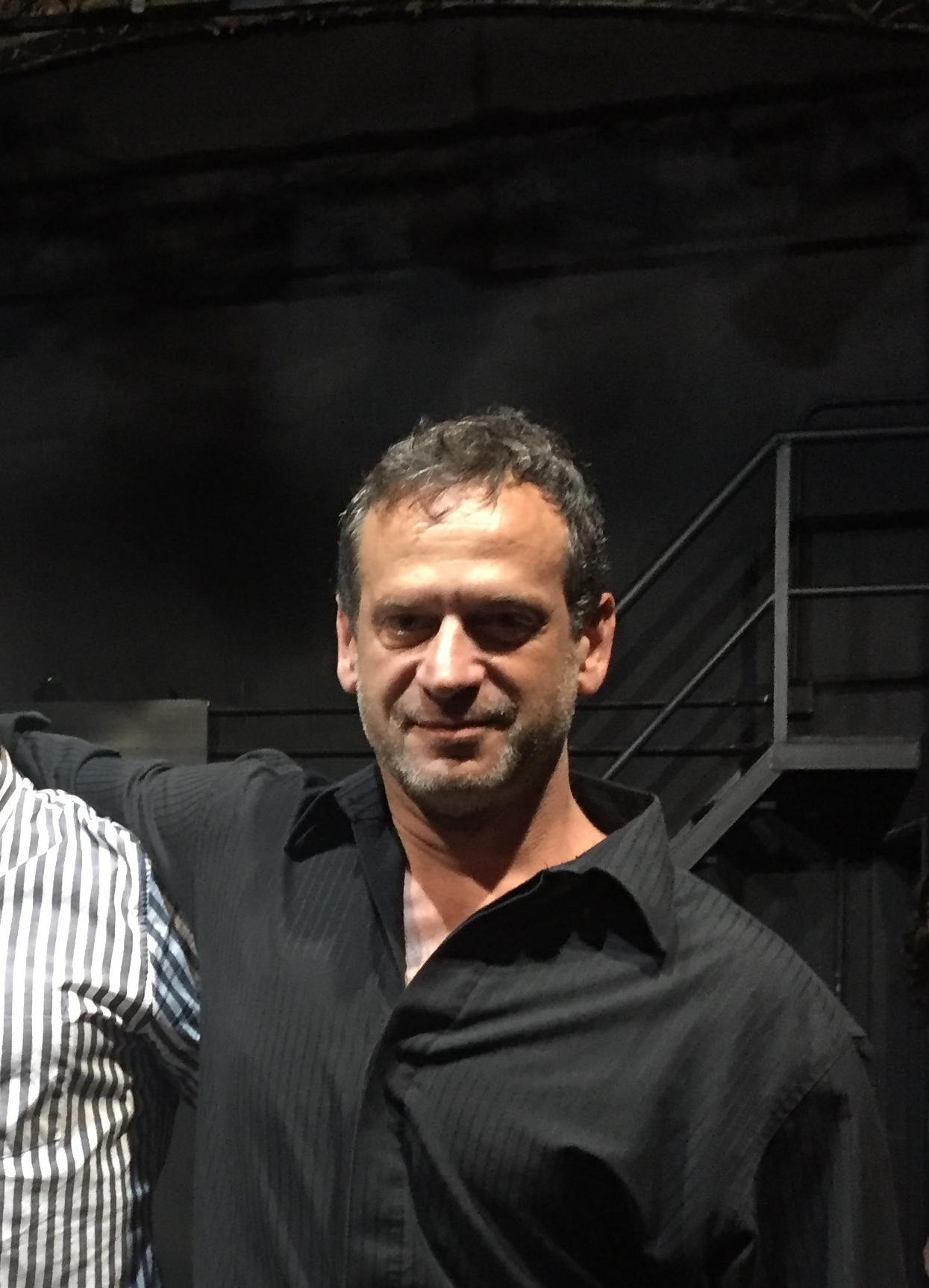
Daniel Kuzniecka in 2017.

Daniel Kuzniecka is an Argentine actor.

== Film ==
As of 2014, Kuzniecka has taken part in 10 films:

Year	Film name	Director	Role
1989	Mujeres	Rosario Zubeldía	
1994	Amigomío	Jeanine Meerapfel – Alcides Chiesa	Carlos
1995	Caballos salvajes	Marcelo Piñeyro	Rodolfo
1996	La revelación	Mario David	Americo
1996	Sin querer	Ciro Cappellari	Mario
1997	Cenizas del paraíso	Marcelo Piñeyro	Nicolás Makantasis
2001	Tres pájaros	Carlos Jaureguialzo	Gustavo Freire
2006	Ciudad en celo	Hernán Gaffet	Sergio
2009	Marea de arena	Gustavo Montiel Pagés	Juan
2014	Insonnia	Brasil	Beto Souza "Martín"

== Theatre ==
- El espacio entre tú y yo
- Quetza, el conquistador (adapted from the original by Federico Andahazi; actor: Agustín García)
