= The Legion Like Women =

1976 film

- Spanish: A la legión le gustan las mujeres... y a las mujeres, les gusta la legión
- Directed by: Rafael Gil
- Written by: Rafael García Serrano; Rafael Gil; Rafael J. Salvia
- Starring: Manolo Codeso; Luis Varela; Francisco Cecilio
- Cinematography: Francisco Sempere
- Edited by: José Luis Matesanz
- Music by: Gregorio García Segura
- Production companies: Coral Producciones Cinematográficas; Rafael Gil Álvarez
- Distributed by: United International Pictures
- Release date: 16 March 1976
- Running time: 95 minutes
- Country: Spain
- Language: Spanish

The Legion Like Women (Spanish: A la legión le gustan las mujeres... y a las mujeres, les gusta la legión) is a 1976 Spanish comedy film directed by Rafael Gil and starring Manolo Codeso, Luis Varela and Francisco Cecilio. It is set during the Spanish Civil War.

== Cast ==
- Manolo Codeso as Poli
- Luis Varela as El Páter
- Francisco Cecilio as Masquedios
- Ricardo Palacios as El Pemán
- Rafael Hernández as Chimbo
- Juanito Navarro as Trino
- Manuel Gil as Josele
- Susana Mayo as Matilde
- María Salerno as Pili
- Mirta Miller as Jacqueline
- Venancio Muro as Soplete
- Mabel Escaño as Teresa
- Blaki as Coronel Dupont
- Patricia Granada as Natacha
- José Nieto as Dupont
- Bebe Palmer as El Guragú
- Fernando Sancho as André Meroy
- Beni Deus as Hans
- Fernanda Hurtado as telephone operator
- Tota Alba as Doña Euduviges
- Pepe Ruiz as Penitente
- Paloma Cela as Isabel
- Xan das Bolas as innkeeper
- Simón Arriaga as nurse
- Rafael Conesa as Cabrales
- María Sánchez Aroca as Lady superior
- María de la Riva as maid
- Miguel Armario as guard
- Antonio del Real
- Salvador Orjas
- Vicente Bañó as Responsible
- Carmen Martínez Sierra
- Pepín Salvador
