= Fernán Mirás =

Argentine actor

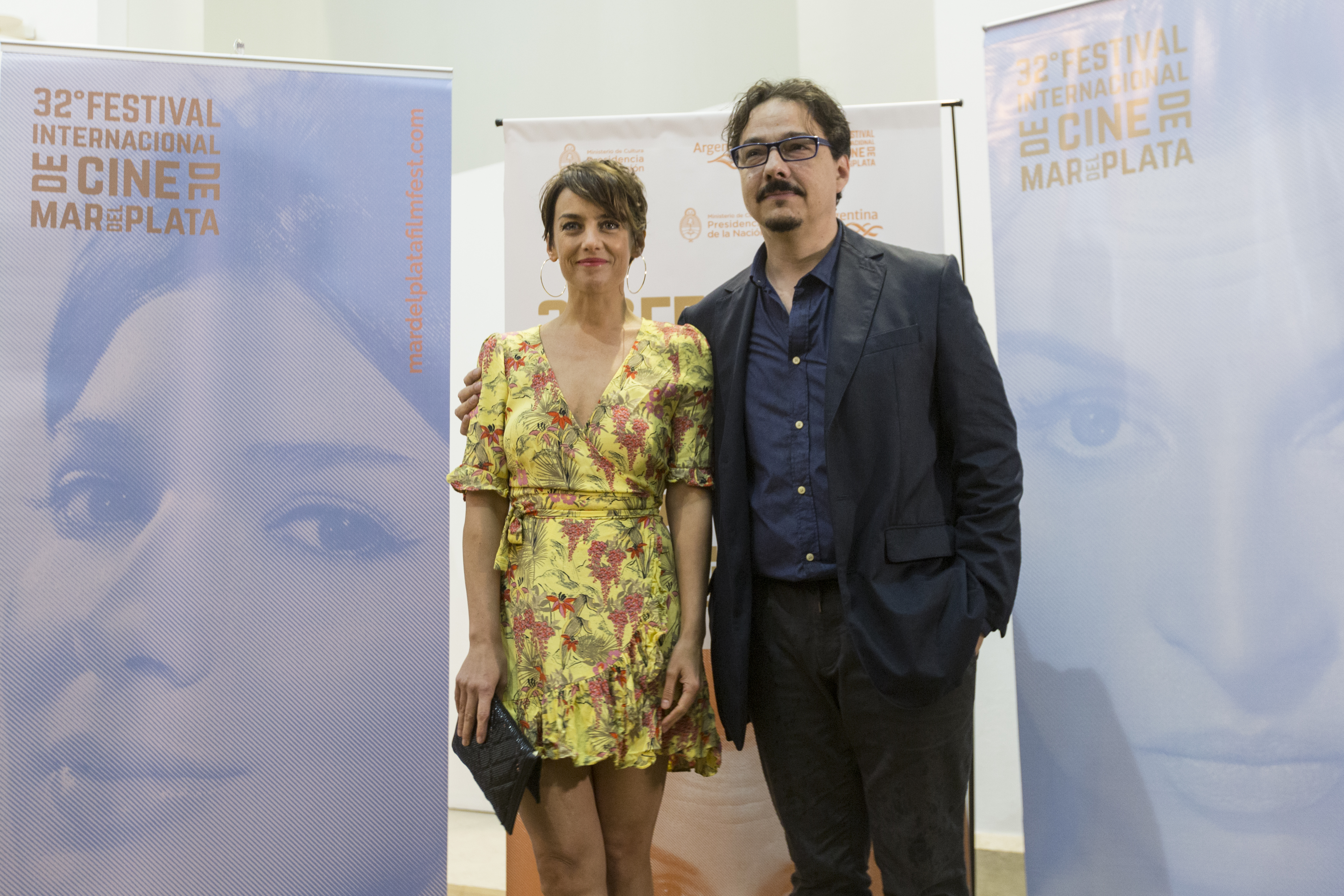
- Fernán Mirás alongside Jazmín Stuart.
- Born: Fernán Gonzalo Mirás; July 17, 1969 (age 57); Buenos Aires, Argentina
- Occupations: Actor and Film Director
- Years active: 1986–present
- Height: 1.75 m (5 ft 9 in)
- Spouse: María Amelia (2000–2019)
- Children: Santiago Mirás; Sofía Mirás; Sebastián Mirás

Fernán Gonzalo Mirás (born July 17, 1969) is an Argentine film and television actor and film director. He is sometimes credited as Fernando Mirás.

== Career ==
He debuted in theater at the play El protagonista, in 1989. In 1993 he starred in the successful film Tango feroz: la leyenda de Tanguito and then consolidated as one of the most prominent actors in Argentine cinema. Acted on ¿Dónde queda el paraíso?, Caballos salvajes, Carlos Monzón, el segundo juicio, Buenos Aires viceversa, Mar de amores, Buenos Aires me mata, La noche del coyote. On television he acted in La banda del Golden Rocket and between 1996 and 1997 it was the Romina Yan heartthrob in Chiquititas. He then starred alongside Nancy Dupláa, Agustina Cherri, Marcela Kloosterboer, Nahuel Mutti, Juan Ponce de León, among others, the youth series Verano del '98. Then he acted in the units Vulnerables and Culpables in 2002 he returned to work with Cris Morena in the first season of Rebelde Way. In 2003 he starred with Gabriel Goity the miniseries Femenino masculino. He continued to participate in the fictions Ambiciones, Botines, Mujeres asesinas , Conflictos en red, Algo habrán hecho por la historia argentina, Socias and Para vestir santos. Between 2012 and 2013 he was one of the protagonists of the Pol-ka unit Tiempos compulsivos. In theater he acted in the works De rigurosa etiqueta, Tres versiones de la vida, La forma de las cosas, Un Dios salvaje, Los hijos se han dormido y El hijo de puta del sombrero. In cinema he acted in Claim, Un día de suerte, La ronda, Horizontal/Vertical, Desbordar, Juan y Eva, Verdades verdaderas, Una cita, una fiesta y un gato negro, The German Friend and Días de vinilo. From 2014-2015, he joined the cast of Underground Producciones for Telefe, Viudas e hijos del Rock & Roll, starring Damian de Santo and Paola Barrientos. Since 2019, he has been part of the cast of the vintage soap opera Argentina, tierra de amor y venganza for Canal 13.

== Theater ==
Year	Title	Character	Director
1986	Cuba y su pequeño Teddy		Luis Agustoni
1989	El protagonista		Luis Agustoni
1996	El avaro		Juan Carlos Gené
2002-2003	De rigurosa etiqueta		Norma Aleandro
2007-2008	Tres versiones de la vida		Luis Romero
2009	La forma de las cosas		Daniel Veronese
2010-2011	Un dios salvaje		Javier Daulte
2011-2012	Los hijos se han dormido		Daniel Veronese
2012-2013	El hijo de puta del sombrero		Javier Daulte
2018	Ejercicios fantásticos del yo		Gael García Bernal

== Movies ==
Year	Movie	Character	Director
1989	La amiga	Pedro	Jeanine Meerapfel
1993	¿Dónde queda el paraíso?	Tomás	
1993	Tango feroz: la leyenda de Tanguito	Tanguito	Marcelo Piñeyro
1995	Caballos salvajes	Martín Juárez	Marcelo Piñeyro
1996	Carlos Monzón, el segundo juicio	Carlos Alberto	Gabriel Arbós
1996	Buenos Aires Vice Versa	Mario	Alejandro Agresti
1997	Mar de amores	Hernán	Víctor Dinenzon
1998	Buenos Aires me mata		Beda Docampo Feijóo
1998	La noche del coyote	Nico Feijóo	Iván Entel
2002	Claim	Borali Jr.	
2002	Un Día de suerte	Walter	Sandra Gugliotta
2008	La ronda	Javier	Inés Braun
2009	Horizontal/Vertical	Ernesto	
2010	Desbordar		
2011	Juan y Eva	Eduardo Ávalos	Paula de Luque
2011	Verdades verdaderas	Kibo Carlotto	Nicolás Gil Lavedra
2012	Una cita, una fiesta y un gato negro	Marcelo	Ana Halabe
2012	The German Friend	Professor Durán	Jeanine Meerapfel
2012	Días de vinilo	Luciano	Gabriel Nesci
2017	Numb, at the Edge of the End	Crazy man	Rodrigo Vila
2017	The Heavy Hand of the Law	Manfredo Doméstico	Fernán Mirás
2018	Rodrigo, fue lo mejor del amor	Oso	Lorena Muñoz
2018	Recreo	Leo	Hernán Guerschuny and Jazmín Stuart
2018	Re Loca	Javier	Martino Zaidelis
2019	TBA		

== Television ==
Year	Title	Character	Channel
1990-1991	Atreverse		Telefe
1991-1993	La banda del Golden Rocket	José	Canal 13
1993	Dos al toque	Ezequiel Garmendia	Canal 13
1995-1997	Chiquititas	Facundo Brausen	Telefe
1998-1999	Verano del '98	Franco Baldassari	Telefe
1999	La mujer del presidente	Rodrigo Leal	Telefe
2000	Vulnerables	Rubén Linares	Canal 13
2000-2002	Tiempo final	Rata/Gonzalo/Ángel	Telefe
2001	Culpables	Guillermo "Willy" Costa	Canal 13
2002	Rebelde Way	Santiago Mansilla	Canal 9
2003	Femenino masculino	Alejandro	Canal 9
2005	Botines	Quique	Canal 13
2005	Conflictos en red	Pablo	Telefe
2005	Ambiciones	Christian Quiroga	Telefe
2006	Mujeres asesinas	Walter	Canal 13
2007	Mujeres asesinas	Fernando	Canal 13
2008	Algo habrán hecho por la historia argentina	Bartolomé Mitre	Telefe
2008-2009	Los exitosos Pells	Teddy	Telefe
2010	Para vestir santos	Sergio Ríos	Canal 13
2012-2013	Tiempos compulsivos	Ricardo Buso	Canal 13
2014-2015	Viudas e hijos del Rock & Roll	Ramiro "Rama" Ferrer	Telefe
2016	Loco por vos	Martín "Tincho" Sosa	Telefe
2016	Ultimatum	Nicolás	TV Pública
2019	Otros pecados	Walter	Canal 13
2019	Argentina, tierra de amor y venganza	Samuel Trauman	Canal 13
2019	El mundo de Mateo	Alejo García	TV Pública
2019	Tu parte del trato	Detective	Canal 13
