= Kamchatka (film) =

2002 film

- Theatrical release poster
- Directed by: Marcelo Piñeyro
- Written by: Marcelo Piñeyro; Marcelo Figueras
- Produced by: Pablo Bossi; Pedro D'Angelo; Oscar Kramer; Francisco Ramos
- Starring: Ricardo Darín; Cecilia Roth; Tomás Fonzi; Héctor Alterio
- Cinematography: Alfredo F. Mayo
- Edited by: Juan Carlos Macías
- Music by: Bingen Mendizábal
- Production companies: Patagonik Film Group; Alquimia Cinema; Oscar Kramer S.A. Televisión Española; Vía Digital
- Distributed by: Buena Vista International (Argentina); Hispano Foxfilms (Spain)
- Release dates: 17 September 2002 (Argentina); 29 November 2002 (Spain)
- Running time: 105 minutes
- Countries: Argentina; Spain
- Language: Spanish
- Budget: $8,000,000
- Box office: $45,379,935

Kamchatka is a 2002 historical drama film directed by Marcelo Piñeyro and written by Piñeyro and Marcelo Figueras. It stars Ricardo Darín, Cecilia Roth, Tomás Fonzi, Héctor Alterio and Leticia Bredice.

The story is set in Argentina in the mid-1970s, during the country's last civil-military dictatorship, and chronicles the life of a family hiding from the military government in rural Argentina. Kamchatka was Argentina's official submission for the 2002 Oscar Awards in the foreign language film category.

== Plot ==
The film is seen through the eyes of a ten-year-old boy, Harry (Matías del Pozo), who does not know that Argentina's 1976 coup d'état is impacting his life.

After witnessing the "disappearance" of dissident friends, a human rights lawyer and his research scientist wife flee the city and hide from the military police in a vacant summer house. With them are their two kids: Harry, who is fascinated with the escape artistry of Harry Houdini, and El Enano, his little brother. (Translated as "Little Guy" in the English subtitles, played by Milton de la Canal. The literal translation would be "dwarf".) The family adopts new identities and attempts to lead a normal life. Later, they are joined by a student who is using the alias Lucas.

Their new life is difficult, but a visit with their estranged grandparents reveals that they are still a close-knit family. Subtly hinted, however, and used as a metaphor, is the mother's constant smoking and El Enano's renewed bed-wetting. Both serve to show how stressful and precarious their situation is.

== Cast ==
- Ricardo Darín as Dad, David Vincent (alias)
- Cecilia Roth as Mom
- Matías Del Pozo as Harry (alias)
- Milton De La Canal as Simón, El Enano (alias)
- Héctor Alterio as Grandfather
- Fernanda Mistral as Grandmother
- Tomás Fonzi as Lucas
- Leticia Bredice as Teacher
- Mónica Scapparone as Bertuccio's Mother
- Evelyn Dominguez as Niña Morena
- Maria Socas as Mom's Friend
- Nicolás Cantafio as Bertuccio
- Gabriel Galíndez as Military Guard
- Juan Carrasco as Priest
- Demián Bugallo as School Mate
- Oscar Ferrigno Jr. as Father Juan
- Alberto Silva

== Background ==
=== Basis of film ===
The film is based on the real-life political events that took place in Argentina after Jorge Rafael Videla's reactionary military junta assumed power on March 24, 1976. During the junta's rule: the parliament was suspended, unions, political parties and provincial governments were banned, and in what became known as the Dirty War, between 9,000 and 30,000 people deemed left-wing "subversives" disappeared from society.

=== Screenplay ===
According to the Internet Movie Database, the screenplay was written by Marcelo Figueras, based on an original story written by Figueras and Marcelo Piñeyro. When the time for the nominations came, the Argentine Film Critics Association credited the authorship of the final script to both of them.

=== Title of film ===
The title refers to the Russian northeastern frontier, which, in the movie, is used by the family's father in the boardgame TEG as the ultimate stand-off, and who uses it as his last resort to win. The title thus alludes to the family situation of hiding away from imminent peril as a final act of defiance before their ultimate downfall. Most scenes were shot at remote or isolated rural locations, such as a farmhouse in Ezeiza, the surroundings of Tandil and Laguna La Brava.

=== Politics in Argentine films ===
Kamchatka is part of what can be considered a second generation group of films to be made in Argentina since the downfall of the Proceso dictatorship (1976–1983). Another film in the second group is Veronico Cruz (1988).

The first group, including such films as The Official Story (1985), Night of the Pencils (1986), and Funny Dirty Little War (1983) dealt with the bare facts of repression, torture, and forced disappearances during the Dirty War.

This second group of films uses metaphor and suggestive images, and hints at wider socio-political issues.

== Critical reception ==
In a review, critic Anji Milanovic called the film an "heartrending drama" and liked the look of the film. He wrote, "The cinematography is gorgeous, and the Argentine countryside looks like a fairytale, all the more distressing given the killing and torture that occurred. The terror they feel is shown in little vignettes of family life."

Ángel Fernández-Santos, film critic for Spanish daily El País, wrote that "Kamchatka has many features to be considered a masterpiece, it is cinema at its fullest, endowed with a very strong emotional pull. It is a tender, grievous and touching elegy. Underneath the intense silent walls of captivity, it hides the thud and rage of the immeasurable collective tragedy".

Mercedes Santos Moray, reporting from the Havana Film Festival, liked that director Piñeyro delivered in giving the audience a suggestive image of the tragic, historical events, and wrote, "The painful memory is represented in an intimate way. Piñeyro works both with the feelings and the reason. His film is a metaphor about the dimensions of freedom. The people still suffer but the danger has disappeared. There are only the phantoms of the past... A family in the film escape the repressions for a moment, but at last their lives are affected by the violent events."

== Awards ==
Wins

- Argentine Film Critics Association Awards: Silver Condor; Best Sound, Carlos Abbate and José Luis Díaz; 2003.
- Cartagena Film Festival: Golden India Catalina; Best Screenplay, Marcelo Figueras and Marcelo Piñeyro; 2003.
- Havana Film Festival: Best Screenplay, Marcelo Piñeyro; Grand Coral - Third Prize, Marcelo Piñeyro; 2003.
- Vancouver International Film Festival: Most Popular Film Marcelo Piñeyro; 2003.
- Young Artist Awards: Young Artist Award; Best Young Ensemble in an International Film, Tomás Fonzi, Matías Del Pozo and Milton De La Canal; 2003.

Nominations

- Argentine Film Critics Association Awards: Silver Condor; Best Actor, Ricardo Darín; Best Art Direction, Jorge Ferrari; Best Cinematography, Alfredo F. Mayo; Best Original Screenplay, Marcelo Figueras and Marcelo Piñeyro; 2003.
- Cartagena Film Festival: Golden India Catalina; Best Film, Marcelo Piñeyro; 2003.
- Flanders International Film Festival: Grand Prix, Marcelo Piñeyro; 2003.

== See also ==
- List of Argentine films of 2002
- List of Spanish films of 2002
