= Julio Diamante =

Spanish film director (1930–2020)

- Born: 27 December 1930; Cádiz, Spain
- Died: 1 August 2020 (aged 89); Madrid, Spain
- Occupations: Film director Screenwriter
- Years active: 1959–1976

Julio Diamante (27 December 1930 – 1 August 2020) was a Spanish film director and screenwriter. He directed ten films between 1959 and 1976. His 1965 film El arte de vivir was entered into the 15th Berlin International Film Festival. He died on 1 August 2020 in Madrid at the age of 89.

== Filmography ==
- Organillo (1959)
- Velázquez y lo velazqueño (1961)
- La lágrima del diablo (1961)
- Tiempo de amor (1964)
- Los que no fuimos a la guerra (1965)
- El arte de vivir (1965)
- Tiempos de Chicago (1969)
- Helena y Fernanda (1970)
- Sex o no sex (1974)
- La Carmen (1976)
