= Carmen Martínez Sierra =

Spanish actress (1904–2012)

Carmen Martínez
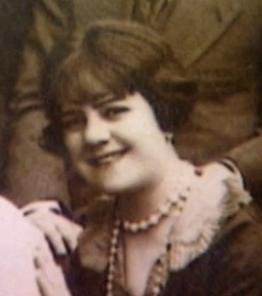
- Martínez Sierra in her youth
- Born: Carmen Martínez Sierra; 3 May 1904; Madrid, Spain
- Died: 6 November 2012 (aged 108); Madrid, Spain
- Resting place: Cementerio de la Almudena
- Occupation: Actress

Carmen Martínez Sierra (3 May 1904 – 6 November 2012) was a Spanish actress.

She started working in the theatre at age 16. Her first years as actress elapsed on stages in operas such as Tosca (1952), Madame Butterfly (1953) or La canción del amor mío (1958). She died in Madrid, Spain on 6 November 2012, aged 108.

== Filmography ==
- Pintadas (1996)
- Supernova (1993)
- Aquí, el que no corre...vuela (1992)
- Canción triste de... (1989)
- Don Cipote de la Manga (1985)
- El cura ya tiene hijo (1984)
- La zorra y el escorpión (1984)
- La de Troya en el Palmar (1984)
- Mar brava (1983)
- Heartbreaker (1983)
- Y del seguro... líbranos Señor! (1983)
- Loca por el circo (1982)
- Las chicas del bingo (1982)
- Un rolls para Hipólito (1982)
- Los líos de Estefanía (1982)
- Gay Club (1981)
- La invasión de los zombies atómicos (1980)
- El divorcio que viene (1980)
- El alcalde y la política (1980)
- Riego sanguíneo (1980)
- Jóvenes viciosas (1980)
- Un cero a la izquierda (1980)
- Tres en raya (1979)
- Historia de 'S' (1979)
- Los energéticos (1979)
- Aventuras de Pinín y sus amigos (1979)
- ¿Pero no vas a cambiar nunca, Margarita? (1978)
- Deseo carnal (1978)
- Estimado Sr. juez... (1978)
- Acto de posesión (1977)
- Chely (1977)
- Estoy hecho un chaval (1977)
- Secretos de alcoba (1977)
- Eva, limpia como los chorros del oro (1977)
- Caperucita y Roja (1977)
- Ésta que lo es... (1977)
- Nosotros que fuimos tan felices (1976)
- Cuando los maridos se iban a la guerra (1976)
- El señor está servido (1976)
- The Legion Like Women (1976)
- La lozana andaluza (1976)
- Haz la loca... no la guerra (1976)
- Bruja, más que bruja (1976)
- Las cuatro novias de Augusto Pérez (1976)
- Yo no perdono un cuerno (1975)
- El último tango en Madrid (1975)
- Un lujo a su alcance (1975)
- Una abuelita de antes de la guerra (1975)
- Como matar a papá... sin hacerle daño (1975)
- Naked Therapy (1975)
- Polvo eres... (1974)
- La mujer con botas rojas (1974)
- Las obsesiones de Armando (1974)
- Sex o no sex (1974)
- Matrimonio al desnudo (1974)
- Cinco almohadas para una noche (1974)
- Un curita cañón (1974)
- Fondue de queso (1974)
- Me has hecho perder el juicio (1973)
- No encontré rosas para mi madre (1973)
- La curiosa (1973)
- El audaz aventurero (1973)
- Pena de muerte (1973)
- Guapo heredero busca esposa (1972)
- El padre de la criatura (1972)
- Las petroleras (1971)
- Las Ibéricas F.C. (1971)
- Carmen Boom (1971)
- La casa de los Martínez (1971)
- Nothing Less Than a Real Man (1972)
- El astronauta (1970)
- Enseñar a un sinvergüenza (1970)
- ¡Se armó el belén! (1970)
- The Complete Idiot (1970)
- Love and Other Solitudes (1969)
- Cuatro noches de boda (1969)
- Verano 70 (1969)
- Jugando a morir (1966)
- El cerro de los locos (1960)
- El tigre de Chamberí (1957)
