= Ashes of Paradise =

1997 film

- Directed by: Marcelo Piñeyro
- Written by: Aída Bortnik; Marcelo Piñeyro
- Produced by: Marcelo Pavan
- Starring: Héctor Alterio; Cecilia Roth; Leonardo Sbaraglia; Daniel Kuzniecka; Leticia Brédice; Nicolás Abeles
- Cinematography: Alfredo F. Mayo
- Edited by: Juan Carlos Macías
- Music by: Osvaldo Montes
- Production companies: Artear; Patagonik Film Group; Promofilm S.A.
- Distributed by: Buena Vista International
- Release date: 7 August 1997
- Running time: 123 minutes
- Country: Argentina
- Language: Spanish

Ashes of Paradise (Spanish: Cenizas del paraíso) is a 1997 Argentine crime drama film directed by Marcelo Piñeyro. It tells in flashbacks how the untroubled private happiness of a family – a judge and his three grown-up sons – crumbles between loyalty and betrayal, blind trust and suspicions.

The film won several awards, among them a renowned Goya Award, for Best Spanish Language Foreign Film (Mejor Película Extranjera de Habla Hispana). It was Argentina's official submission for the 1997 Academy Award for Best Foreign Language Film, but did not receive a nomination for the award.

== Plot ==
The film opens with the fall of the respected judge Costa Makantasis from the Federal Courthouse. Next, his oldest son Pablo is seen dragging the body of young and beautiful Ana Muro through the house in which he lives with his two younger brothers.

Two different judges begin to investigate the two deaths. It is soon assumed that Costa Makantasis committed suicide. The case of Ana Muro, however, investigated by Beatriz Teller, is complicated by the fact that all three sons confess the murder, each claiming that he acted alone and that the other two are innocent; and really some evidence speaks against each one of them. In addition, they urge Teller to believe that their father was murdered and that his case also requires investigation. Teller, on the other hand, is pressured by her superiors to hand over the case of the three brothers to the judge assigned to Costa Makantasis' apparent suicide. Fearing that a dirty truth behind the supposed suicide shall be covered up, she risks her career by rejecting to give up her case.

Combining cutbacks with segments of the investigations and hearings, the film sets to unravelling the story leading up to the deaths. The remaining film is divided into four unequal parts, each dedicated to one of the sons and Ana Muro. In each part, fragments of the story are shown from the perspective of the respective character, combining to the complete picture only at the end of the film.

It becomes apparent that Costa Makantasis had investigated Ana Muro's father, the powerful businessman Francisco Muro, suspecting him to be involved in corruption and even murder. Unbeknown to the two, Makantasis' youngest son, Alejandro (Nicolás Abeles), and Ana Muro fell in love with each other, and Ana Muro moved in with Alejandro and his brothers. When Costa Makantasis found out that Ana was Francisco Muro's daughter, he was concerned, but believed that their private and his professional affairs with the Muro family should and could remain separate. For a short time, everything seemed perfect: Alejandro and Ana were a happy couple, and the Makantasis family celebrated the father's anniversary with a frolicsome party.

Soon, however, tensions arose both from inside and outside of the family. Second-oldest son Nicolás (Daniel Kuzniecka) cheated with Ana on his brother, and later, Ana also tried to flirt with oldest brother Pablo; Pablo, who had in the past snatched some of Nicolás' girl-friends, resisted Ana's charm and instead found out about her infidelity with Nicolás.

Francisco Muro, on the other hand, found out about the relationship between his daughter and the son of his political opponent, assumed foul-play and came close to threatening Costa Makantasis to keep his son away from Ana. The conflict between the judge and the businessman generally increased, and Costa Makantasis suspected that Muro tapped his house. So, when Costa Makantatis saw that Ana Muro let employees of her father into his house, he and his oldest son told her to stop that and explained it with the suspicions against her father. Believing in a misconception, Ana took secret documents of her father to Costa Makantasis' office to prove her father's innocence. There, however, she had a closer look at the documents, realized that at least some of the suspicions were well-founded, and flew the office.

Just after she departed, two of Muro's employees arrived and killed Makantasis by pushing him from the roof of the building. Ana Muro had just left the building, whereas the three Makantasis brothers were just arriving at the Courthouse to take their father to lunch. At the moment of the murder, Ana Muro looked up to the roof and saw that the judge was being pushed; Pablo watched Ana Muro look up and, mistaking her troubled look, believed her to be involved in what he instantly understands to be his father's murder. So, when Ana leaves the scene, he shouts to his brothers that she had killed their father; when Alejandro objects, Pablo reveals that Ana had cheated on him with Nicolás. Then Pablo followed Ana, who raced to her father, threw the secret documents back at him and called him a murderer in public. Pablo, watching the scene, realized that Ana had not been part of the crime.

Alejandro, however, had now heard Pablo's accusations and seen Nicolás' guilty face. He turned home where he tore down and cut off the decorations that Ana and he had set up in his room. When Ana came home to him, he affronted her, telling her she cheated on him and killed his father. Ana, almost in tears, affirmed both, but added that she loved him. When Alejandro continued to offend her, she thrust herself into a knife that Alejandro still held in his hand from destroying the decorations.

The film ends with a confrontation of the three brothers in the office of investigating judge Teller. It remains unclear whether Teller eventually learns the truth or whether the story told in the cutbacks remains unknown to her. After she has sent the three brothers back to their prison cells, she comments that justice may not be possible to achieve. The film finishes with the three brothers sent further and further down in an escalator to where are presumably their prison cells.

== Cast ==
- Cecilia Roth as Beatriz Teller
- Héctor Alterio as Costa Makantasis
- Leonardo Sbaraglia as Pablo Makantasis
- Daniel Kuzniecka as Nicolás Makantasis
- Nicolás Abeles as Alejandro Makantasis
- Leticia Brédice as Ana Muro
- Jorge Marrale as Francisco Muro
- Rita Cortese as Mirta
- Chela Ruíz as Isabel Güemes
- María Fiorentino as Hilda
- Mónica Scapparone as Carolina Miranda
- Alejo García Pintos as Yeti
- Celina Font as Dolores
- Ernesto Claudio as Judge Martini

== Awards and nominations ==
Ashes of Paradise won several awards, the most renowned being a Goya Award for Best Spanish Language Foreign Film (Mejor Película Extranjera de Habla Hispana) in 1998.

In 1997, it was Argentina's official submission for the 1997 Academy Award for Best Foreign Language Film ("Oscar"), but did not receive a nomination for the award. It won three awards at the Havana Film Festival, for Best Screenplay and Best Music, and the OCIC Award for Piñeyro; for the Audience Award at the Festival, Piñeyro finished second. At the San Sebastián International Film Festival, Piñeyro was nominated for a Golden Seashell.

In 1998, Ashes of Paradise was nominated for ten Argentine Film Critics Association Awards, better known as Silver Condors, including Best Film, Best Director, Best Original Screenplay, Best Actor (Héctor Alterio), Best New Actor (Nicolás Abeles) and Best Supporting Actor (Daniel Kuzniecka). Eventually, it won only one Silver Condor, for Leticia Brédice as Best Supporting Actress. Also in 1998, Piñeyro won the Audience Award at the Lleida Latin-American Film Festival.

== See also ==
- List of submissions to the 70th Academy Awards for Best Foreign Language Film
- List of Argentine submissions for the Academy Award for Best Foreign Language Film
