= The Hidden (2005 film) =

- Theatrical release poster
- Spanish: Oculto
- Directed by: Antonio Hernández
- Screenplay by: Antonio Hernández; Enrique Brasó
- Starring: Laia Marull; Leonardo Sbaraglia; Angie Cepeda; Geraldine Chaplin; Joaquín Climent; Gerardo Malla; Emma Cohen
- Cinematography: Unax Mendía
- Edited by: Javier Laffaille
- Music by: Banda Osiris
- Distributed by: Warner Sogefilms
- Release dates: 16 October 2005 (Sitges); 4 November 2005 (Spain)
- Countries: Spain; United Kingdom; Italy
- Language: Spanish

The Hidden (Spanish: Oculto) is a 2005 psychological thriller film directed by Antonio Hernández from a screenplay by Hernández and Enrique Brasó which stars Laia Marull, Leonardo Sbaraglia, and Angie Cepeda. It is a Spanish-British-Italian co-production.

== Plot ==
Natalia is obsessed by a monolith appearing in her dreams. Upon meeting in a lecture on dream interpretation, she comes across Beatriz (a woman with tattoos similar to the inscriptions on the monolith and who actually has a secret plan of revenge against Natalia), and Álex, a man who starts to fall romantically for both of them.

== Cast ==
- Laia Marull as Beatriz
- Leonardo Sbaraglia as Álex
- Angie Cepeda as Natalia
- Geraldine Chaplin as Adela
- Joaquín Climent as Roberto
- Gerardo Malla as Ignacio Wissman
- Emma Cohen as Leonor
- Gary Piquer as Carlos
- William Miller as Javier
- Marta Aledo as Inés

== Production ==
Antonio Hernández and Enrique Brasó took over writing duties. The film was produced by Icónica and Zebra Producciones, alongside Italy's Sintra Films and UK's Future Films. Shooting locations included Madrid. Unax Mendía worked as cinematographer.

== Release ==
The film was presented at the Sitges Film Festival on 15 October 2005. Distributed by Warner Sogefilms, it was released theatrically in Spain on 4 November 2005.

== See also ==
- List of Spanish films of 2005
