= Montserrat Julió =

Spanish actress

- Born: Montserrat Julió i Nonell; 1929; Barcelona, Catalonia, Spain
- Died: 26 January 2017 (aged 87–88); Madrid
- Occupation: Actress
- Years active: 1957-1995

Montserrat Julió (1929 – 26 January 2017) was a Spanish film and television actress. She died on 26 January 2017 at aged 88.

== Biography ==
In 1939, she went into exile in Santiago, Chile. After experiencing the Civil War, Montserrat, barely ten years old, crossed into France with her family (her parents were members of the Unified Socialist Party of Catalonia). In France, while her father remains in a refugee camp in the south of the country, she was housed in a castle near Cognac. From there, once they had gathered, they boarded the ship SS Winnipeg as refugees bound for Chile.

In Santiago, he became involved with the cultural circles of the Republican exile and many of its representatives, including Xavier Benguerel, Domènec Guansé, Trabal, César Augusto Jordana, and Joan Oliver i Sallarès.He studied at the Teatro Ensayo of the Pontifical Catholic University of Chile, alongside Hernán Letelier and Myriam Thorud. He graduated with a degree in Dramatic Arts from the University of Santiago, Chile.

In 1956, he returned to Spain, where he collaborated with the Agrupació Dramàtica de Barcelona, and performed in Italy.From 1959 to 1961, he returned to live in Chile, where he directed the Sociedad de Arte Dramático de Santiago (Santiago Drama Society).

In 2003, he published Vida endins (Viena Ediciones), in which he recalls his exile and the development of his career. With these memoirs, he won the “Román Planas de Memorias Populares 2002” award.

== Partial filmography ==
- La cárcel de cristal (1957) - Irene Alsuaga
- Sendas marcadas (1957) - Policía
- Cumbres luminosas (Montserrat) (1957) - Madre de Freddie
- A Land for All (1962) - Teresa
- La cuarta ventana (1963) - Adela
- La Tía Tula (1964) - Paquita
- El Diablo también llora (1965) - Carmen Castariega
- The Art of Living (1965) - Ana's Sister
- La visita que no tocó el timbre (1965) - María Luisa
- La Barrera (1966) - Mujer del panadero
- El arte de no casarse (1966)
- Zampo y yo (1966) - Clara - la doncella
- Cuando tú no estás (1966)
- Codo con codo (1967)
- Club de solteros (1967)
- El Baldiri de la costa (1968)
- Susana (1969)
- Chicas de club (1970) - Madre
- Goya, a Story of Solitude (1971)
- Dr. Jekyll y el Hombre Lobo (1972) - Agatha, a party guest (uncredited)
- The Blood Spattered Bride (1972) - Carol's mother
- A Candle for the Devil (1973) - Beatriz
- Horror Rises from the Tomb (1973) - Odile
- Vengeance of the Zombies (1973) - Flora
- Murder in a Blue World (1973) - Presentadora programa cine
- Autopsia (1973) - Mujer de Azcona
- Manolo, la nuit (1973)
- Vida conyugal sana (1974)
- El chulo (1974)
- Sex o no sex (1974) - Madre de Paco
- Tocata y fuga de Lolita (1974) - Adela
- Los nuevos españoles (1974) - Martirio
- No encontré rosas para mi madre (1974) - Amiga de Teresa
- Una abuelita de antes de la guerra (1975)
- Valley of the Dancing Widows (1975) - Cecily Breidlinger
- ¡Ya soy mujer! (1975) - Amelia
- El paranoico (1975) - Vecina de Esther (uncredited)
- Robin and Marian (1976) - 1st Sister
- Batida de raposas (1976) - Secretaria de Leandro
- El segundo poder (1976) - Hermana Portera
- Foul Play (1977) - Alcaldesa
- Tío, ¿de verdad vienen de París? (1977) - Laura
- Impossible Love (1977) - Adela
- Doña Perfecta (1977) - Remedios
- Las truchas (1978)
- Alice in Spanish Wonderland (1978) - Profesora de historia
- La visita del vicio (1978) - Sally
- La ràbia (1978)
- La rebelión de los pájaros (1982)
- Wheels on Meals (1984)
- Puzzle (1986) - Esposa Luis
- Mi general (1987)
