= F.E.N. =

- Theatrical release poster
- Directed by: Antonio Hernández
- Screenplay by: Antonio Hernández; Avelino Hernández
- Starring: Héctor Alterio; Joaquín Hinojosa; José Luis López Vázquez; José Mª Muñoz; Luis Politti; Laura Cepeda
- Cinematography: Teo Escamilla
- Edited by: José Salcedo
- Music by: Carlos Vizziello
- Production company: Micrafilm
- Distributed by: Arte 7
- Release dates: October 1979 (Seminci); 22 February 1980 (Spain)
- Country: Spain
- Language: Spanish

F.E.N. (Note: After the acronym for Formación del espíritu nacional (FEN), a mandatory school subject in Francoist Spain.) is a 1979 Spanish drama film directed by Antonio Hernández. Its cast is toplined by Héctor Alterio, Joaquín Hinojosa, José Luis López Vázquez, Chema Muñoz, Luis Politti, and Laura Cepeda. The plot explores education during the Francoist dictatorship.

== Plot ==
Taking advantage of a school vacation, two former students (Octavio and Francisco) kidnap their school teachers (Alfredo, Domingo, and Jesús) to enact revenge by submitting them to the same vexations they were subject to when they were children with the complicity of a maid. The nature of the role reversal relationship between students and teachers is not explained in the beginning of the film.

== Cast ==
- Héctor Alterio
- Joaquín Hinojosa
- José Luis López Vázquez
- José María Muñoz
- Luis Politti
- Laura Cepeda

== Release ==
F.E.N. premiered at the 24th Valladolid International Film Festival (Seminci), running 13–21 October 1979. It also received a screening at the 30th Berlin International Film Festival in February 1980. The film was released theatrically in Madrid on 22 February 1980. The theatrical release in Andalusia was sabotaged through vandalism and bomb threats by right-wing groups in cities such as Almería and Seville.

== Production ==
The film was written by Antonio Hernández in tándem with his brother Avelino. Shooting locations included the Colegio Calasancio in the district of Salamanca, Madrid.

== Reception ==
Jesús Fernández Santos of El País assessed that Hernández achieves the goal of beginning his film career with a "personal style, [as well as] a tone and quality uncommon in early works".

== See also ==
- List of Spanish films of 1980
