= Cecilia Dopazo =

Argentine actress

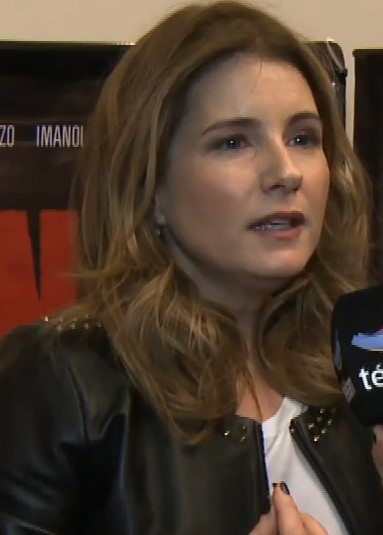
- Dopazo in 2014
- Born: 17 November 1969 (age 56); Buenos Aires, Argentina
- Occupation: Actress
- Years active: 1977 – present

Cecilia Dopazo (born 17 November 1969) is an Argentine actress. She appeared in more than twenty films since 1977.

== Selected filmography ==
Year	Title	Role	Notes
1993	Tango Feroz	Marianne	
1995	Wild Horses		
1997	Comanche Territory	Laura	
2000	Acrobacias del Corazón		
2004	No sos vos, soy yo		
2023	Women on the Edge	Fanny	
