= The Art of Living (film) =

1965 film

- Directed by: Julio Diamante
- Written by: Julio Diamante; Elena Sáez
- Produced by: Peter Carsten
- Starring: María del Carmen Abreu
- Cinematography: Luis Enrique Torán
- Edited by: Pedro del Rey
- Release dates: June 1965 (Belin); 27 July 1966 (Spain)
- Running time: 85 minutes
- Country: Spain
- Language: Spanish

The Art of Living (Spanish: El arte de vivir) is a Spanish drama film directed by Julio Diamante in 1965. It was entered into the 15th Berlin International Film Festival.

== Cast ==
- María del Carmen Abreu - Julia Smeyers
- Anastasio Alemán - Psychologist
- Antonio Buero Vallejo - Father of Pupil of Luis
- Julio Diamante - Comrade of Luis
- Beatriz Galbó
- Juan Luis Galiardo - Juanjo
- Lola Gaos - Mother of Luis
- Luigi Giuliani - Luis
- Montserrat Julió - Ana's Sister
- Lola Losada
- Sergio Mendizábal - Comrade of Luis
- Carlos Muñiz
- Lauro Olmo
- José María Prada - Galvez
- Fernando Sánchez Polack
- Manuel Summers - Adversary
- Elena María Tejeiro - Ana
- Paco Valladares - Santiago
