= A Land for All =

Spanish war film directed by Antonio Isasi-Isasmendi

- Directed by: Antonio Isasi-Isasmendi
- Written by: José María Font; Jorge Feliu
- Produced by: Antonio Irles; Antonio Isasi-Isasmendi
- Cinematography: Francisco Marín
- Edited by: Emilio Rodríguez
- Music by: Juan Durán Alemany
- Production companies: Isasi P.C. Suevia Films
- Distributed by: Metro-Goldwyn-Mayer Ibérica
- Release date: 22 March 1962
- Running time: 92 minutes
- Country: Spain
- Language: Spanish

A Land for All (Spanish: Tierra de todos) is a 1962 Spanish war film directed by Antonio Isasi-Isasmendi and starring Manuel Gallardo, Fernando Cebrián and Montserrat Julió.

== Main cast ==
- Manuel Gallardo as Juan
- Fernando Cebrián as Andrés
- Montserrat Julió as Teresa
- Amparo Baró as María
- Lluís Torner as Pedro
- Juan Lizárraga as Rafa
- Fernando Repiso as Chico
- María Zaldívar as Manuela
- Antonio Andrada as Don Elías

== Bibliography ==
- Bentley, Bernard P. E. (2008). A Companion to Spanish Cinema. Boydell & Brewer Ltd. ISBN 978-1-85566-176-9.
