= Room in Rome =

2010 film by Julio Médem

- Theatrical release poster by Ouka Leele
- Spanish: Habitación en Roma
- Directed by: Julio Medem
- Written by: Julio Medem
- Produced by: Álvaro Longoria
- Starring: Elena Anaya; Natasha Yarovenko; Enrico Lo Verso; Najwa Nimri
- Cinematography: Alex Catalán
- Edited by: Julio Medem
- Music by: Jocelyn Pook
- Production companies: Morena Films; Alicia Produce
- Distributed by: Paramount Spain
- Release dates: 24 April 2010 (Málaga); 7 May 2010 (Spain)
- Running time: 107 minutes
- Country: Spain
- Languages: English; Spanish; Russian; Italian; Basque

Room in Rome (Spanish: Habitación en Roma) is a 2010 Spanish erotic romantic comedy-drama film directed by Julio Medem starring Elena Anaya and Natasha Yarovenko, depicting the emotional and sexual relations of two women throughout a single night in a hotel room in Rome. The plot is loosely based on another film, In Bed. Room in Rome was Medem's first English language film.

== Plot ==
During the first day of the summer in June, Alba, a 30-year-old Spanish tourist in Rome, brings a younger Russian woman, Natasha, to her hotel room during the last night of both their vacations in Rome. The details of how they met are left vague. Once in the room, Natasha is at first quite reluctant, insisting that she is straight, but the clearly more experienced Alba overcomes Natasha's hesitation. Flattered and tempted by Alba, Natasha responds to her sexual advances, but continues to maintain that she is straight and has never had sex with a woman. Alba counters by claiming that she is a lesbian and has never had sex with a man.

Alba and Natasha first get undressed and into bed, but Natasha is still very nervous. Alba suggests that they first lie side by side and only casually touch each other's faces. They do so until Alba becomes so relaxed that she falls asleep. Natasha quietly gets out of bed, gets dressed and leaves the room, wondering what would have happened if she stayed. In her rush to leave, Natasha leaves her phone behind, and the ring-tone wakes up Alba. Natasha soon returns and asks Alba for her cell phone, but is reluctant to enter the room again. When a passing night-shift waiter named Max passes by, Alba grabs Natasha and takes her back into the room. While talking about the location of Natasha's hotel and looking at an old map of Rome from the 1st century, Alba continues to flirt with Natasha. Natasha soon succumbs to her attraction and curiosity towards Alba, leading her to get undressed and into bed where she and Alba have sex for the first time. Both women embrace and fall into their lovemaking easily. The intensity of their encounter is both raw and aggressive, and they masturbate each other to their first climaxes.

Over the next 10 hours, Alba and Natasha grow closer to each other as Natasha becomes more relaxed and comfortable with their lovemaking. Alba and Natasha share stories, periodically stopping to illustrate their points with pictures on the Internet, talk about the artwork in the hotel room, and explore each other's bodies. Alba first tells a story about how her mother abandoned her when she was a little girl and she ended up as the kept woman of a wealthy Arab in Saudi Arabia, while Natasha later shares a story of her abusive father and her twin sister's career as an art historian. The women make love again, but at a more leisurely pace. Natasha mounts Alba and kisses her all the way down her body. Alba succumbs to Natasha as she is pleasured orally. Natasha turns her body and she and Alba form into a sixty-nine position. They pleasure each other orally until they orgasm together.

Eventually, the two women tell each other the truth. Natasha reveals that her real name is Dasha who comes from a wealthy family living near Moscow and that she is actually a professional tennis player on vacation, and is to be married the following week in Russia, to a man. Natasha's twin sister, Sasha, a model and career actress, phones her at least twice during the film to ask of her whereabouts and wedding plans. Alba then reveals that she is actually a mechanical engineer/inventor in Rome on business and she lives with a woman in San Sebastian, Spain. Alba shows Natasha a video of herself and her life partner, named Edurne, who has two small children and who are of Basque origin. Alba also says that the little boy died recently in a drowning accident. She says the story she related earlier is that of her mother, who left her Saudi father to break free.

Natasha and Alba have breakfast together at dawn, which is served by Max. They discuss abandoning their partners and living together in Rome, but both seem to realize that this is not possible. While Alba tells Natasha that she feels she is falling in love with her, Natasha gets more defensive and insists that her attraction to Alba only stems from curiosity towards women, but not through love. After having sex a final time, in the shower, where they sing and masturbate each other again, they hang the white bed sheet up a flagpole on the balcony of the room as a joke, the lovers decide to part ways, returning to their previous lives in Russia and Spain. They agree to let the passionate night they shared remain a secret between them. In the final shot, after leaving the hotel and walking away from each other, Natasha calls out to Alba and runs towards her.

== Cast ==
- Elena Anaya as Alba
- Natasha Yarovenko as Natasha
- Enrico Lo Verso as Max
- Najwa Nimri as Edurne

== Production ==
The film was produced by Morena Films production alongside Alicia Produce, and it had the participation of TVE and Canal+. It was shot almost entirely on a sound stage in Madrid, Spain as the hotel room setup. The location of the hotel in the film is an empty square called Piazzetta di San Simeone, the same square used in opening and closing shots of the film.

Principal photography took place in Rome and Madrid from 26 January to 27 February 2009.

== Release ==
Selected to have its world premiere as the 13th Málaga Film Festival's closing film, Room in Rome premiered in April 2010. Distributed by Paramount Spain, it was theatrically released in Spain on 7 May 2010.

== Reception ==
Jonathan Holland of Variety described the film as a "typically challenging, potentially divisive item from Spanish auteur Julio Medem, and a partial return to form", but despite praising the acting and craft of the film Holland writes "there’s the sense that he’s more interested in his ideas than in his people."

== See also ==
- List of Spanish films of 2010

== Bibliography ==
- González, Clarissa (2011). "Visibilidad y diversidad lésbica en el cine español. Cuatro películas de la última década". Revista Icono14. Revista Científica de Comunicación y Tecnologías Emergentes. 9 (3): 221. doi:10.7195/ri14.v9i3.110. ISSN 1697-8293.
