= Comanche Territory (1997 film) =

1997 film

- Directed by: Gerardo Herrero
- Written by: Salvador García Ruiz; Arturo Pérez-Reverte; Alberto Lecchi; Gerardo Herrero (dialogue)
- Based on: Territorio Comanche by Arturo Pérez-Reverte
- Produced by: Gerardo Herrero
- Starring: Imanol Arias; Carmelo Gómez; Bruno Todeschini; Gastón Pauls; Cecilia Dopazo
- Cinematography: Alfredo Mayo
- Edited by: Carmen Frías
- Music by: Iván Wyszogrod
- Production company: Tornasol Films
- Distributed by: Alta Films
- Release date: 7 March 1997
- Running time: 88 minutes
- Countries: Spain; France; Argentina; Germany
- Language: Spanish

Comanche Territory (Spanish: Territorio Comanche) is a 1997 Spanish drama war film produced and directed by Gerardo Herrero and starring Imanol Arias, Carmelo Gómez, Cecilia Dopazo, Bruno Todeschini and Gastón Pauls. It is based on the homonymous novel by Arturo Pérez-Reverte, based on his own experiencies as war correspondent at Sarajevo during the early stages of the siege. Pérez-Reverte also co-wrote the screenplay. It was entered into the 47th Berlin International Film Festival.

== Cast ==
- Imanol Arias as Mikel Uriarte
- Carmelo Gómez as José
- Cecilia Dopazo as Laura Riera
- Mirta Zečević as Jadranka
- Bruno Todeschini as Olivier
- Gastón Pauls as Manuel
- Natasa Lusetic as Helga
- Ecija Ojdanić as Jasmina
- Javier Dotú as Andrés
- Iñaki Guevara as Carlos
- Ivan Brkić as Francotirador
