= Fernando Cebrián =

Spanish actor (1929–2009)

- Born: 15 May 1929; Bilbao, Spain
- Died: 30 January 2009 (aged 79); Madrid, Spain
- Other name: Fernando Cebrián Gracia
- Occupation: Actor
- Years active: 1956-1993

Fernando Cebrián (1929–2009) was a Spanish film and television actor.

== Selected filmography ==
- The Legion of Silence (1956)
- A Land for All (1962)
- Marisol rumbo a Río (1963)
- The Spy Who Loved Flowers (1966)
- Target Goldseven (1966)
- Crónicas de un pueblo (1971-1974)
- The Glass Ceiling (1971)
- Iguana (1988)

== Bibliography ==
- José María Caparrós Lera. Historia del cine español. T&B, 2007
