= Sex o no sex =

- Directed by: Julio Diamante
- Screenplay by: Julio Diamante
- Produced by: Tadeo Villalba
- Starring: Carmen Sevilla; José Sacristán
- Cinematography: Antonio L. Ballesteros
- Edited by: Pablo G. del Amo
- Music by: Carmelo A. Bernaola
- Production companies: Alexandre Films; C.B. Films S.A.
- Distributed by: Divisa Home Video
- Release date: 5 September 1974
- Running time: 94 min
- Country: Spain

Sex o no sex is a 1974 Spanish comedy film directed and written by Julio Diamante. It is composed by Carmelo A. Bernaola and it is starred by Don Jaime de Mora y Aragón, Antonio Ferrandis and José Sacristán. It was the penultimate film directed by Julio Diamante and the third one whose cast is composed by José Sacristán and Carmen Sevilla.

== Cast ==
- Carmen Sevilla as Angélica
- José Sacristán as Paco Jiménez 'Don Paco'
- Antonio Ferrandis as Director
- José Vivó as Psicoanalista
- Ágata Lis as Chica sexy
- Lola Gaos as Tía de Angélica
- Carmen Martínez Sierra as Dama solitaria y confiada
- Sergio Mendizábal
- Margarita Calahorra
- Montserrat Julió
- Sandra Dos Santos as Chica sexy en el tren (as Xandra Dos Santos)
- Pedro Mounier
- Don Jaime de Mora y Aragón as Tomás 'el muestras'
