= Natasha Yarovenko =

Ukrainian-born actress

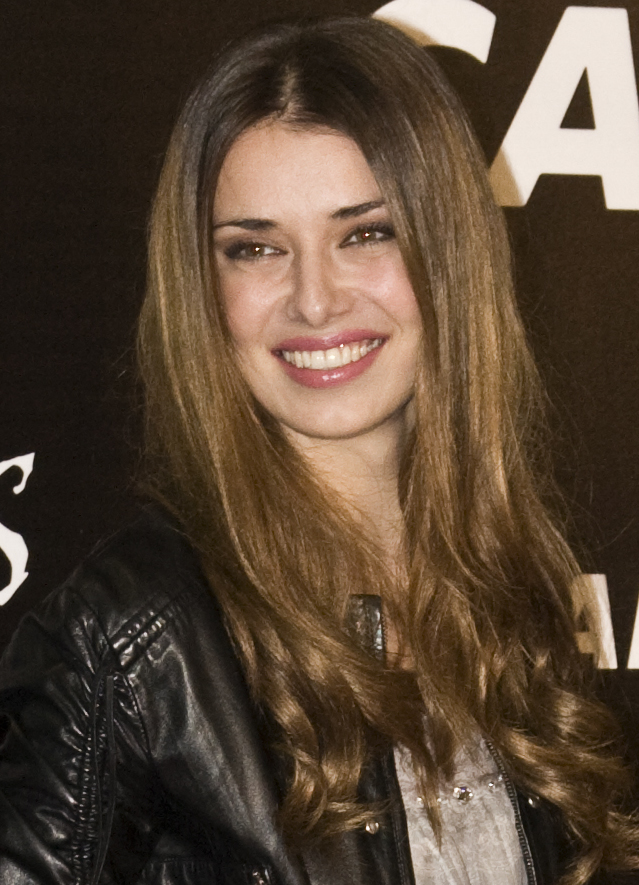
- Natasha Yarovenko at the photocall of Alice in Wonderland in 2010
- Born: Natalia Olegovna Yarovenko; 23 July 1979 (age 47); Odesa, Ukrainian SSR, Soviet Union
- Education: Odesa University
- Occupation: Actress
- Years active: 2000–present

Natalia "Natasha" Olegovna Yarovenko (Ukrainian: Наталія (Наташа) Олеговна Яровенко; born 23 July 1979) is a Ukrainian born actress residing in Spain.

== Biography ==
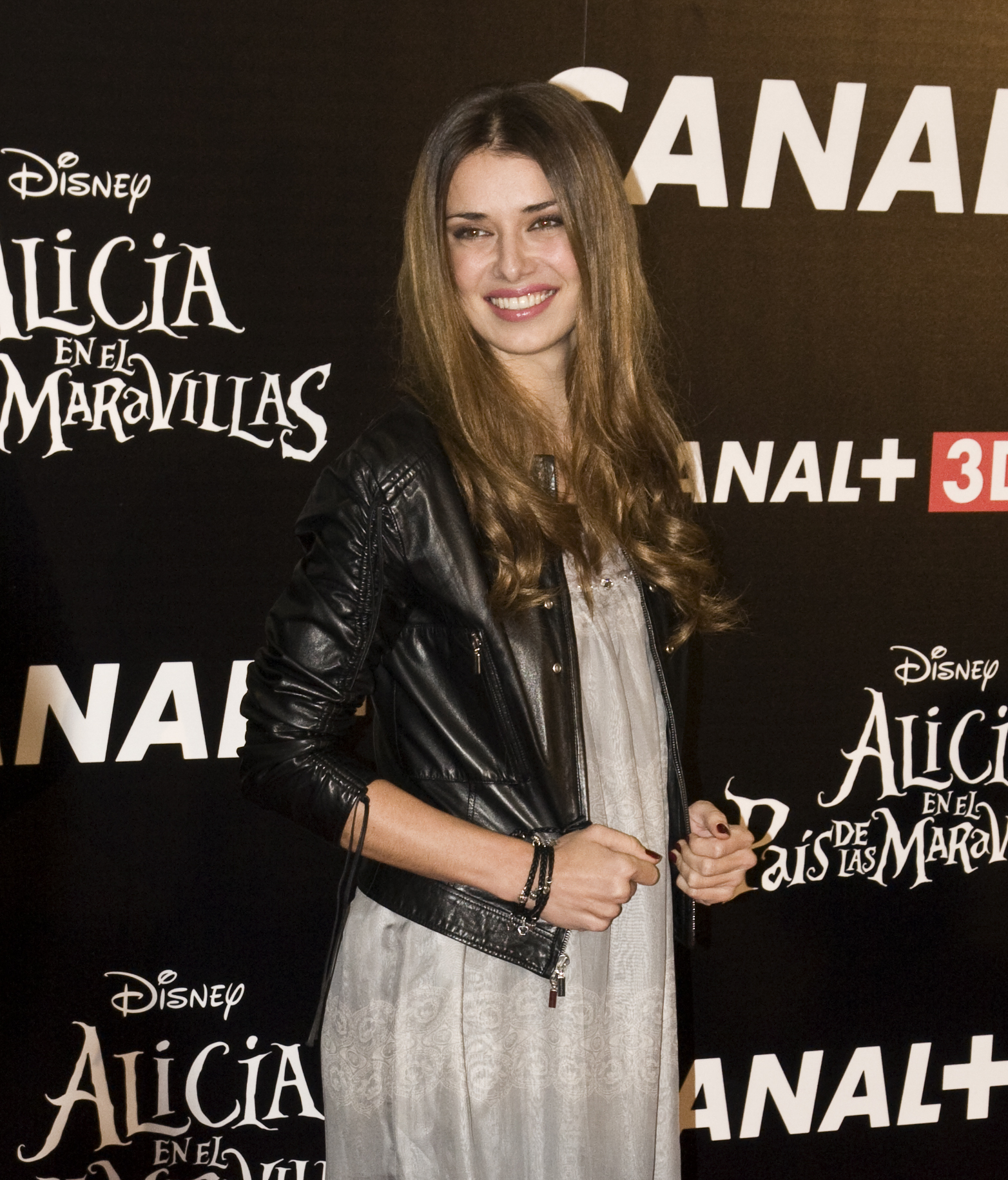
Natasha Yarovenko at the photocall of Alice in Wonderland in 2010

Natasha Yarovenko was born in Odesa, then part of Soviet Ukraine, to a Ukrainian father and Russian mother, although she has always consider herself to be Russian. She grew up in a family of engineer parents. Yarovenko graduated in Russian–English Philology in a university of her birth city and, during that time, also lived in Moscow. In 2000 she moved to Barcelona where she began her career as an actress. Yarovenko first appeared on regional television in Catalonia and then debuted on national television.

In 2011, Yarovenko won two awards for the Best New Actress for her role in the film Room in Rome, one at the Turia Awards and the other at the 25th Goya Awards.

At the end of 2010, Yarovenko bought a small island in the Bahamas for $200,000.

== Filmography ==
- 2008 – Diary of a Nymphomaniac (Mae)
- 2009 – Black Buenos Aires (Alma)
- 2010 – Room in Rome (Natasha)
- 2010 – Negro Buenos Aires (Alma/Natasha)
- 2011 – Order of the Grail (Sigrid)
- 2012 – Aftershock (Irina)
- 2015 – Las aventuras del capitán Alatriste (María de Castro)
- 2016 – Loki 7 (Ivanna)
- 2020 – Captain of Desert
