= Wild Horses (1995 film) =

1995 film

Caballos salvajes
- Theatrical poster and DVD release cover
- Directed by: Marcelo Piñeyro
- Written by: Aída Bortnik; Marcelo Piñeyro
- Produced by: Hugo Belcastro; Margarita Gómez; Pablo Kompel
- Starring: Héctor Alterio; Leonardo Sbaraglia; Cecilia Dopazo; Federico Luppi
- Music by: Andrés Calamaro; León Gieco; Johann Strauss
- Release date: 10 August 1995
- Running time: 122 minutes
- Country: Argentina
- Language: Spanish
- Box office: 747,311 admissions (Argentina)

Wild Horses (Spanish: Caballos salvajes) is a 1995 Argentine drama road movie directed by Marcelo Piñeyro and written by Piñeyro and Aída Bortnik. It stars Héctor Alterio, Leonardo Sbaraglia, Cecilia Dopazo and Fernán Mirás. Renowned actors Cipe Lincovsky and Federico Luppi both appear in cameo appearances. The film chronicles the five days of two fugitives who are on the run after inadvertently robbing a corrupt corporation and being targeted by the media.

At the time of its release Wild Horses was critically acclaimed and quickly became the most popular Argentinian film of the year. It was selected as the Argentine entry for the Best Foreign Language Film at the 68th Academy Awards, but it was not accepted as one of the final nominees. Wild Horses is currently considered a classic of Argentina's cinema in its native country as well as abroad.

== Plot ==
José is an aging anarchist who decides to get even with the bank corporation that stole U$S15,344 from his family 18 years ago. When confronted by the yuppie manager, Pedro Mendoza, José threatens to kill himself and orders him to hand in the requested amount of money. In the ensuing chaos, Pedro stumbles upon a drawer holding half a million dollars and puts it all in the bag. He then asks José to take him hostage so that the police will not shoot them, and both drive away successfully.

After the robbery, Pedro is confronted with a dilemma: he cannot turn himself in after finding out that the stolen money is actually laundered money that Pedro's boss, Rodolfo, has been secretly keeping for the mafia and with the bank's knowledge, and he will thus have trouble with both groups. After learning of this, Pedro decides to join José on a road trip to Patagonia as they run away from both the police and hired thugs who Rodolfo and the mafia have set on their trail.

On their way to the border Pedro and José eventually bond and decide to correct the false claims made by the media about them, looking to clear their names and justify their actions. They tape a message and send it to the TV, and on their way to safety they are aided by several Patagonian gas station attendants who view the couple as modern-day Robin Hoods. They are nicknamed by the press coverage "Los Indomables" (The Indomitables).

The duo decide to take a bus that will get them closer to the border with Chile after their car accidentally ends up in a river. Aboard the bus, they meet a young punk girl, Ana, who steals the bag containing the half million dollars, but promptly returns it when they catch up with her. After she realizes who Pedro and José are, they decide to let her into their society, and she steals a jeep for them. The three decide to "return" the money to the people, creating a mock-up bomb that blows up a briefcase containing the half-million, which rains on a cheering crowd. Keeping only what is necessary for the trip, the group sets on the run again.

The "Los Indomables" group manages to get near the border after dodging a pursuing helicopter; with the aid of the gas station attendants they avoid roadblocks and two hitmen sent by the mafia, whom they finally encounter and get rid of after taking their clothes and guns. Shortly after they meet with Eusebio, who is married to Natalia, the sister of José's long-dead wife Clara, and with whom José had a falling out years ago. After reconciling with Eusebio, José reveals his past profession (which was kept secret throughout the story) to Pedro: he is a former horse breeder, who tried to get back the money stolen from him by the bank so he could buy back the land where his horses live before a meatpacking plant can get ahold of the animals and uses them to make horse meat. José tells Eusebio he doesn't want to buy the land or his old house again, instead purchasing all the animals he bred so they can be set free and live as wild horses at the foot of the mountains.

As a group of armed men find the two hitmen bested by Los Indomables and get close to their new location, José bids farewell to Pedro and Ana, who have fallen in love, as they ride away on two horses and cross the border into Chile. Alone, José frees all of his horses, and as he sets the last one going, he is shot in the back by one of their persecutors offscreen. José dies wishing to have more time to spend with Pedro but also feeling content at having recently regained his love for life and for noble people. José's horses are then shown running free, while in a flashback José himself dances with joy to Johann Strauss II's Tales from the Vienna Woods and shouts to the skies how good it feels to be alive.

== Cast ==
- Héctor Alterio as José
- Leonardo Sbaraglia as Pedro
- Cecilia Dopazo as Ana
- Fernán Mirás as Martín Juárez
- Daniel Kuzniecka as Rodolfo
- Antonio Grimau as Enrique García del Campo
- Cipe Lincovsky as Natalia
- Federico Luppi as Eusebio
- Eduardo Carmona
- Adrián Yospe as Thug 1
- Mónica Scapparone as Mónica
- Regina Lamm as Margarita Lamadrid
- Héctor Malamud as Mozo
- Alex Benn as Esteban
- Jorge García Marino as Pedro's father
- Miguel Ruiz Díaz as Thug 2
- Fernando Álvarez as Truck driver 1
- Tito Haas as Truck driver 2
- Ernesto Claudio as Editor
- Emilio Bardi as Carrasco
- Jorge Petraglia as Rogelio
- Pablo Patlis as Assistant to García del Campo
- Eduardo Peaguda as Saverio
- Óscar Rodríguez as Truck driver
- Alejandro Fiore as Truck driver
- Alejandro Fain as Truck driver
- Jorge Prado as Truck driver
- Miguel Ángel Porro as Petrol station owner
- Hernán Alix as Policeman 1
- Juan Carlos Silvetti as Policeman 2
- Julia Calvo as Nurse
- Analía Vigliocco as Nurse
- Celina Tell
- Laura Carina Pantaleone as Journalist+
- Héctor Bordoni
- Marina Peralta Ramos
- Federico D'Elía
- Luz Moyano
- Guadalupe Martínez
- Guillermo Hernández
- Silvia Dotta
- Marcelo Carmelo
- José Zelik
- Augusto Rommer
- Roberto Dimare

== See also ==
- List of submissions to the 68th Academy Awards for Best Foreign Language Film
- List of Argentine submissions for the Academy Award for Best Foreign Language Film
