= Elisita =

- Directed by: Juan Caño Arecha
- Written by: Juan Caño Arecha
- Produced by: Antonio Egea
- Starring: Nicolas De Santis; Encarna Paso; Lola Gaos; Concha Gómez Conde; Imanol Arias
- Cinematography: Andrea D'Odorico
- Edited by: Iván Aledo
- Music by: Luis Eduardo Aute
- Release date: April 4, 1980
- Country: Spain
- Language: Spanish

Elisita is a 1980 Spanish dramatic film written and directed by Juan Cano Arecha.

The film is a love story between a young student (Antonio) and an older woman (Elisita). Action takes place in Madrid, Spain during the Francoist State.

== Plot ==
The film begins in 1980's Spain during Spain's transition to democracy. An old single woman (Elisita) sits alone in ‘The Retiro’ park in central Madrid remembering her only love story during the post civil war in Spain.

Flashback takes us back to Francisco Franco's Francoist State. Elisita is an intelligent young but mature woman who lives with her rich widower and extremely Catholic mother Dona Elisa. Elisita's mother encourages her to find a husband and marry before she is too old. Antonio is a young student friend of the family who is preparing for his school exams. Too young to be her husband, Antonio is mutually attracted by her caring personality. Elisita is asked to help Antonio with his Latin and math lessons. As they spend several afternoons together they develop a close bond. Elisita knows this might be her last chance to fall in love and Antonio's first encounter with passion. As days pass, Elisita and Antonio fall in love and the inevitable happens.

== Cast ==
- Nicolas De Santis - Antonio
- Encarna Paso - Elisita
- Lola Gaos – Dona Elisa
- Imanol Arias – Boy in park
- Mari Paz Ballesteros - Amiga
- Concha Gomez Conde – Antonio's mother
- Guillermo Heras – Doctor
- Socorro Anadon – Girl in park

== Production notes ==
Nicolas De Santis who plays Antonio as lead actor is the son of famous Spanish actress Maria Cuadra and Italian producer Eduardo De Santis. He made his debut in this movie at 14 years of age.
