= Antonio Hernández (director) =

Spanish film director and screenwriter (born 1953)

Antonio Hernández (born 1953) is a Spanish filmmaker. He was born in Peñaranda de Bracamonte.

In 1994, he created the TV company Zeppelín Televisión.

== Filmography ==
=== Film ===
Year	Film	Director	Writer	Notes
1980	F.E.N.	Yes	Yes	
1981	Apaga... y vámonos	Yes	Yes	
1991	Cómo levantar mil kilos	Yes	Yes	
1999	Lisboa	Yes	Yes	
2000	El gran marciano	Yes	Yes	
2002	En la ciudad sin límites	Yes	Yes	
2005	Oculto	Yes	No	
2006	Los Borgia	Yes	Yes	
2007	El menor de los males	Yes	Yes	
2011	El Capitán Trueno y el Santo Grial	Yes	No	
2015	Matar el tiempo	Yes	Yes	Also producer
2025	Parecido a un asesinato (Hidden Murder)	Yes		
