= Marcelo Figueras =

Argentine author and screenwriter

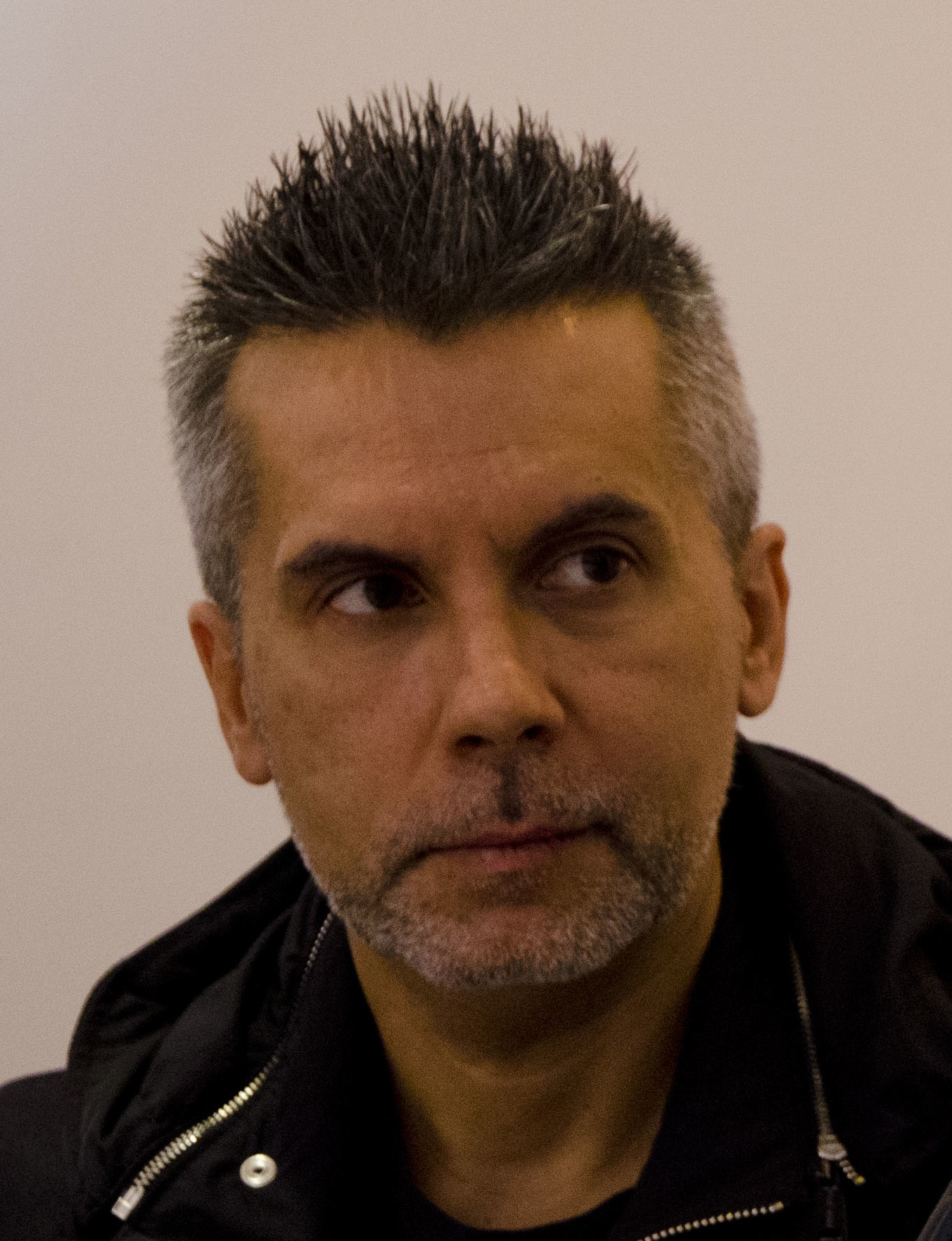
Marcelo Figueras

Marcelo Figueras (born 1962 in Buenos Aires, Argentina) is an Argentine writer and a screenwriter.

== Novels ==
- El muchacho peronista
- El espía del tiempo, (2002)
- Kamchatka, 2003 (published in English in 2010 translated by Frank Wynne)
- La batalla del calentamiento, (2007)
- Aquarium (2009).

== Filmography (Screenplays) ==
- Rosario Tijeras (2005)
- Peligrosa obsesión (2004)
- Kamchatka (2002)
- Plata quemada (2000) a.k.a. Burnt Money and Burning Money

== Awards ==
Wins

- Cartagena Film Festival: Golden India Catalina Award; Best Screenplay for Kamchatka, 2003.
- Argentine Film Critics Association Awards: Silver Condor Award; Best Adapted Screenplay, for Plata quemada, 2001.

Nominated

- Ariel Awards: Silver Ariel Award; Best Screenplay Adapted from Another Source, for Rosario Tijeras, Mexico, 2006.
- Argentine Film Critics Association Awards: Silver Condor Award; Best Original Screenplay, for Kamchatka, 2003.
