= Marcelo Piñeyro =

Argentine film director, screenwriter, and film producer (born 1953)

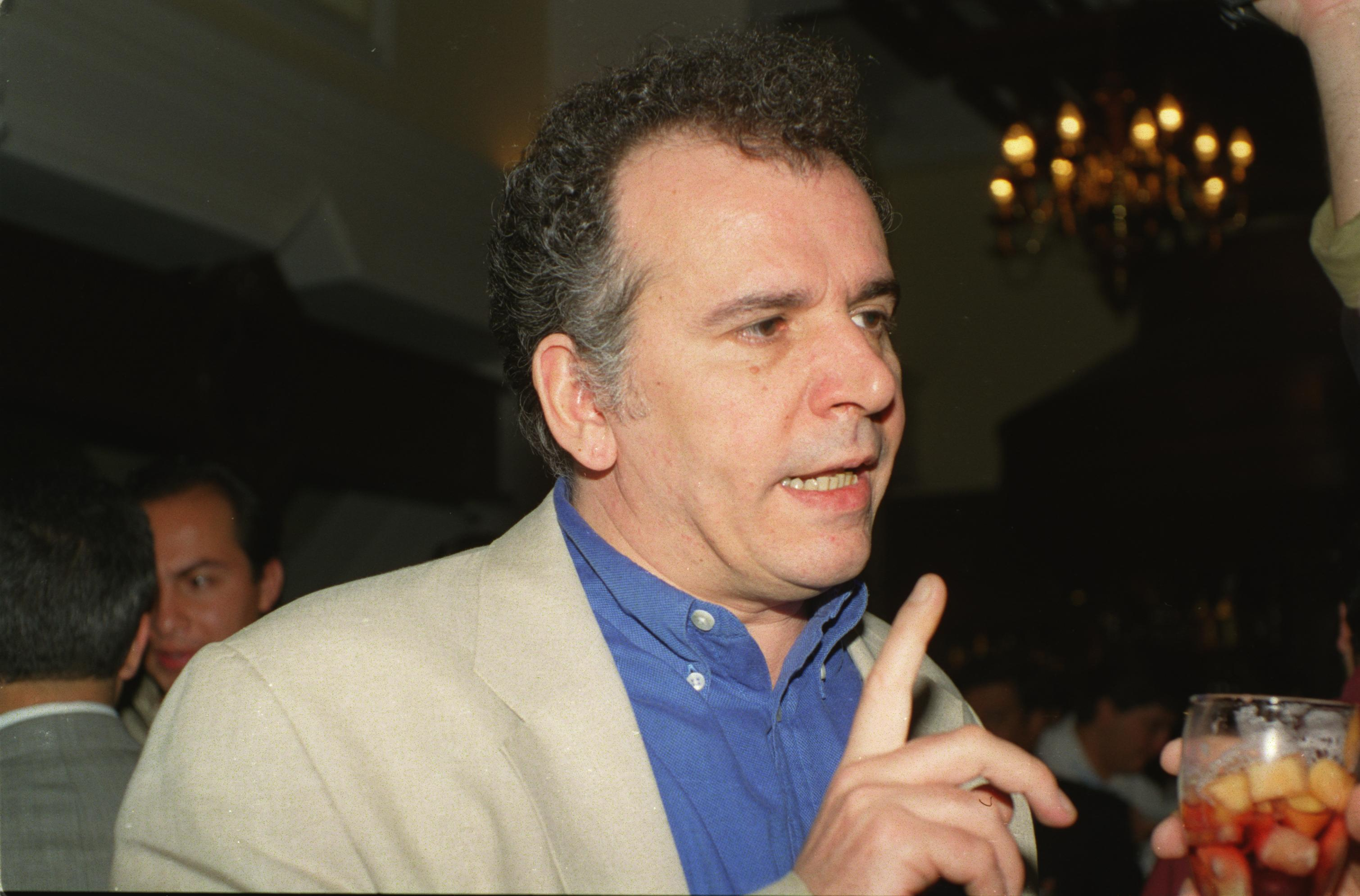
- Marcelo Piñeyro
- Born: Marcelo Piñeyro; 5 March 1953 (age 73); Buenos Aires, Argentina
- Occupations: director; screenwriter; producer
- Years active: 1980–present

Marcelo Piñeyro (born March 5, 1953) is an Argentine award-winning film director, screenwriter, and film producer.

== Biography ==
Born in Buenos Aires, Piñeyro studied cinematography at the University of La Plata's School of Fine Arts. In 1980, he and his associate Luis Puenzo founded Cinemania, a Latin American production company.

In 1984, Piñeyro came to international attention as executive producer of The Official Story (directed by Luis Puenzo). In 1985, the film became the first Latin American movie to win an Academy Award for the Best Foreign Language Film.

In 1992, Piñeyro premiered as a director with Tango Feroz (Tanguito, Wild Tango). In Argentina, the film set attendance records and initiated a debate about the country's past. Screened at such film festivals as the Toronto International Film Festival in 1993, the film won several awards including the Premio del Jurado Joven en el Festival de San Sebastián (1993).

Caballos Salvajes (Wild Horses) (1995), Piñeyro's second film as director, became the second-highest attended film in Argentina. It received a number of awards, including the Jury's Special Mention at the 1996 Sundance Film Festival. The film also played such festivals as the Mostra Internazionale del Film Venecia and the New Directors/New Films Festival (1996) at the Museum of Modern Art in New York City, New York.

Piñeyro's next film, Cenizas del paraíso (Ashes of Paradise), was produced by Buena Vista International and became Argentina's highest-grossing film in 1997. It won a number of international awards, among them the Spanish Goya Award for Best Foreign Film in Spanish and was selected to present Argentina for the Academy Award for Best Foreign Film. In addition, the film was screened at a number of international film festivals, ranging from the Donostia-San Sebastián International Film Festival to the Toronto International Film Festival.

In 2000, Plata quemada (Burnt Money) gained international recognition and reached a considerable audience worldwide. In Uruguay, where a large part of the plot takes place, Plata quemada became even the most viewed film of the year. Screened at international film festivals like Venice, Biarritz, Toronto, and Rio de Janeiro, it also won a number of awards and award nominations.

In 2001, Piñeyro contributed the short film "El Dorado" to Argentina Vivo 2001, an anthology of shorts by Argentine directors. The following year, his feature Kamchatka played at film festivals in Berlin, Germany, Bahia, Brazil; Miami, Florida, U.S., and Sydney, Australia, and was selected to represent Argentina for the Academy Award for Best Foreign Film.

His next film, El método (The Method), premiered in 2005 and was shown at several international film festivals, including the 2005 Toronto International Film Festival. It won two Goya Awards (2006), including one for Piñeyro for best adapted script.

In 2009, Las viudas de los jueves (The Widows of Thursdays) was released.

As of 2013, his most recent film is Ismael, starring Mario Casas, Belén Rueda and Sergi López.

Piñeyro has so far worked with Héctor Alterio (4 times), Leonardo Sbaraglia (4 times), Cecilia Roth (3 times), Leticia Brédice (3 times), Ernesto Alterio (2 times), Eduardo Noriega (2 times), Pablo Echarri (2 times) and Fernán Mirás (2 times), as well as Federico Luppi, Imanol Arias, Dolores Fonzi and Natalia Verbeke.

Piñeyro, as of April 2007, has been scripting a new project in collaboration with Marcelo Figueras, with whom Piñeyro had already worked for Plata Quemada and Kamchatka.

== Filmography ==
Director and writer

- Tango feroz: la leyenda de Tanguito (1993) Tanguito
- Caballos Salvajes (1995) a.k.a. Wild Horses
- Cenizas del paraíso (1997) a.k.a. Paradise Ashes
- Historias de Argentina en vivo (2001) (as one of several directors)
- Kamchatka (2002) (solely director)
- Plata quemada (2002) a.k.a. Burnt Money
- El método (2005) aks The Method
- Las viudas de los jueves (2009) aks The Widows of Thursdays
- Ismael (2013)

Producer

- La historia oficial (1985) a.k.a. The Official Story
