= Lola Gaos =

Spanish actress (1921–1993)

- Born: Dolores Gaos González-Pola; December 2, 1921; Valencia, Spain
- Died: July 4, 1993 (aged 71); Madrid, Spain

Dolores Gaos González-Pola (2 December 1921, in Valencia – 4 July 1993, in Madrid), better known as Lola Gaos, was a Spanish film, television and theatre actress.

Famous with her works with Luis Buñuel but specially the film Furtivos where she played the dominant mother.

== Selected filmography ==
- El sotano (1949)
- Esa pareja feliz (1953) - Reina en Rodaje
- El candelabro (1956, Short)
- Susana y yo (1957) - Estudiante #2
- Un marido de ida y vuelta (1957) - Lola
- Moloka (1959) - (uncredited)
- Un ángel tuvo la culpa (1959) - Chantajista
- Alma aragonesa (1961) - Antonia
- Viridiana (1961) - Enedina
- Prohibido enamorarse (1961) - Justina
- Tres de la Cruz Roja (1961) - Madre de Tere
- Los pedigüeños (1961)
- Salto mortal (1962)
- Atraco a las tres (1962) - Hermana de Fernando Galindo (uncredited)
- Las cuatro verdades (1962)
- Rogelia (1962) - Mendiga
- Millonario por un día (1963) - Carmen
- El Verdugo (1963) - Mujer visitante de la obra nº 3
- Benigno, hermano mío (1963)
- A este lado del muro (1963, Short)
- Confidencias de un marido (1963)
- Se vive una vez (1963)
- Tiempo de amor (1964) - Gitana
- La Tía Tula (1964) - (uncredited)
- Los dinamiteros (1964) - María
- Anabel (1964, Short)
- El diablo también llora (1965)
- El arte de vivir (1965) - Madre de Luis
- El sonido de la muerte (1966) - Calliope
- La busca (1966) - Petra
- El precio de un hombre (1966) - Ruth Harmon
- Tres perros locos, locos, locos (1966)
- Residencia para espías (1966) - Omar's Wife
- A la memoria del autor (1966, Short) - (voice)
- Los chicos con las chicas (1967) - Doña Arsenia
- Madame Arthur (1967, Short)
- Tristana (1970) - Saturna
- Growing Leg, Diminishing Skirt (1970) - Doña Úrsula
- Préstame quince días (1971) - Flora
- Nicholas e Alexandra (1971)
- My Dear Killer (1972) - Adele Rudigiani
- Mi querida señorita (1972) - Tía Chus
- Marianela (1972) - La Señana
- Pancho Villa (1972) - Old Woman
- The Guerrilla (1973) - Aldeana
- Ceremonia sangrienta (1973) - Carmilla
- Sex o no sex (1974) - Tía de Angélica
- Furtivos (1975) - Martina
- De profesión: polígamo (1975) - Madre de María
- El poder del deseo (1975) - Madre de Javier
- Caperucita y roja (1977) - Farmacéutica
- Dios bendiga cada rincón de esta casa (1977) - Sagrario
- Sonámbulos (1978) - Fátima
- La isla de las cabezas (1978)
- Elisita (1980) - Dona Elisa
- Tu estas loco, Briones (1980) - Sor Piedad
- Trágala, perro (1981) - Madre Superiora
- El lago de las vírgenes (1982) - The virgins' mother
- Latidos de pánico (1983) - Mabile
- El Balcón abierto (1984) - La Poncia
- Caso cerrado (1985) - Funcionaria Prisión
- Hierro dulce (1985)
- La noche de la ira (1986) - Enriqueta
- Gran sol (1989) - (final film role)
