= Women on the Edge (2023 film) =

- Argentine theatrical release poster
- Directed by: Azul Lombardía
- Screenplay by: Jazmin Rodriguez Duca; Sebastián Meschengieser; Alberto Rojas Apel
- Story by: Jazmin Rodriguez Duca
- Produced by: Alejandro De Grazia; Maximiliano Dubois; Sandra Rojas
- Starring: Carla Peterson; Julieta Díaz
- Cinematography: Eric Elizondo
- Edited by: Vanesa Ferrario
- Music by: Mariano Otero
- Production companies: Tiger House; Cimarrón Cine; Habitacion 1520 Producciones; Pan Contenidos; Tondero Producciones
- Distributed by: Bf Paris (Argentina); Tondero Distribución (Peru)
- Release dates: September 21, 2023 (Argentina & Peru); September 28, 2023 (Uruguay)
- Running time: 93 minutes
- Countries: Argentina; Uruguay; Peru
- Language: Spanish

Women on the Edge (Spanish: No me rompan, lit. 'Don't break me') is a 2023 comedy film directed by Azul Lombardía and written by Sebastián Meschengieser, Jazmín Rodríguez Duca and Alberto Rojas Apel. It stars Carla Peterson and Julieta Díaz accompanied by Salvador del Solar, Esteban Lamothe, Eugenia Guerty, Celina Font, Jazmín Rodríguez, Martin Garabal, Lalo Rotavaria, Brenda Kreizerman, Alfonso Tort, Cecilia Dopazo, Nancy Dupláa, Fito Páez, Claudia Fernández, Maitina De Marco and Nazarena Nobile. It is a co-production between Argentina, Uruguay and Peru.

== Synopsis ==
Ángela and Vera are two strong-willed women who, although they belong to different worlds, also go through the same pressures and responsibilities. When life puts them in front of a guru obsessed with eternal youth, they join forces to confront him through an absolutely unusual but fair plan.

== Cast ==
The actors participating in this film are:

- Carla Peterson as Ángela Trigal
- Julieta Díaz as Vera Lombardi
- Salvador del Solar as Edgardo Sánchez Leven
- Eugenia Guerty as Cecilia
- Alfonso Tort as Ramiro
- Esteban Lamothe as Fercho
- Celina Font as Natalia
- Jazmín Rodríguez Duca as Teresa
- Martín Garabal as Fede
- Cecilia Dopazo as Fanny
- Nancy Dupláa as Mónica
- Fito Páez as Novela director
- Claudia Fernández as Paola Blejer
- Brenda Kreizerman as Emilce
- Lalo Rotavería as Rober
- Maitina De Marco as Susy
- Nazarena Nóbile as Mónica
- Federica Hiriart Mañosa as Dulcinea
- Margarita Arias Reinaldo as Teodora
- Marcelo Mariño as Villalba
- Nina Della Maggiora as Chelo
- Sol Gesto as Barbie

== Production ==
Principal photography lasted 6 weeks in Montevideo, Uruguay and Buenos Aires, Argentina.

== Release ==
Women on the Edge premiered on September 21, 2023, in Argentine and Peruvian theaters, then expanded to Uruguayan theaters on September 28, 2023.

== Box-office ==
In its first week on the Argentine billboard, it placed fourth, selling 25,763 tickets. In its second week, it fell 2 places, selling 16,560 tickets. For its third week, it sold 7,166 tickets, ranking in eighth place. Throughout its run in theaters, the film attracted 96,000 spectators to the cinema, becoming the seventh highest-grossing Argentine film in 2023.
