= Héctor Alterio =

Argentine actor (1929–2025)

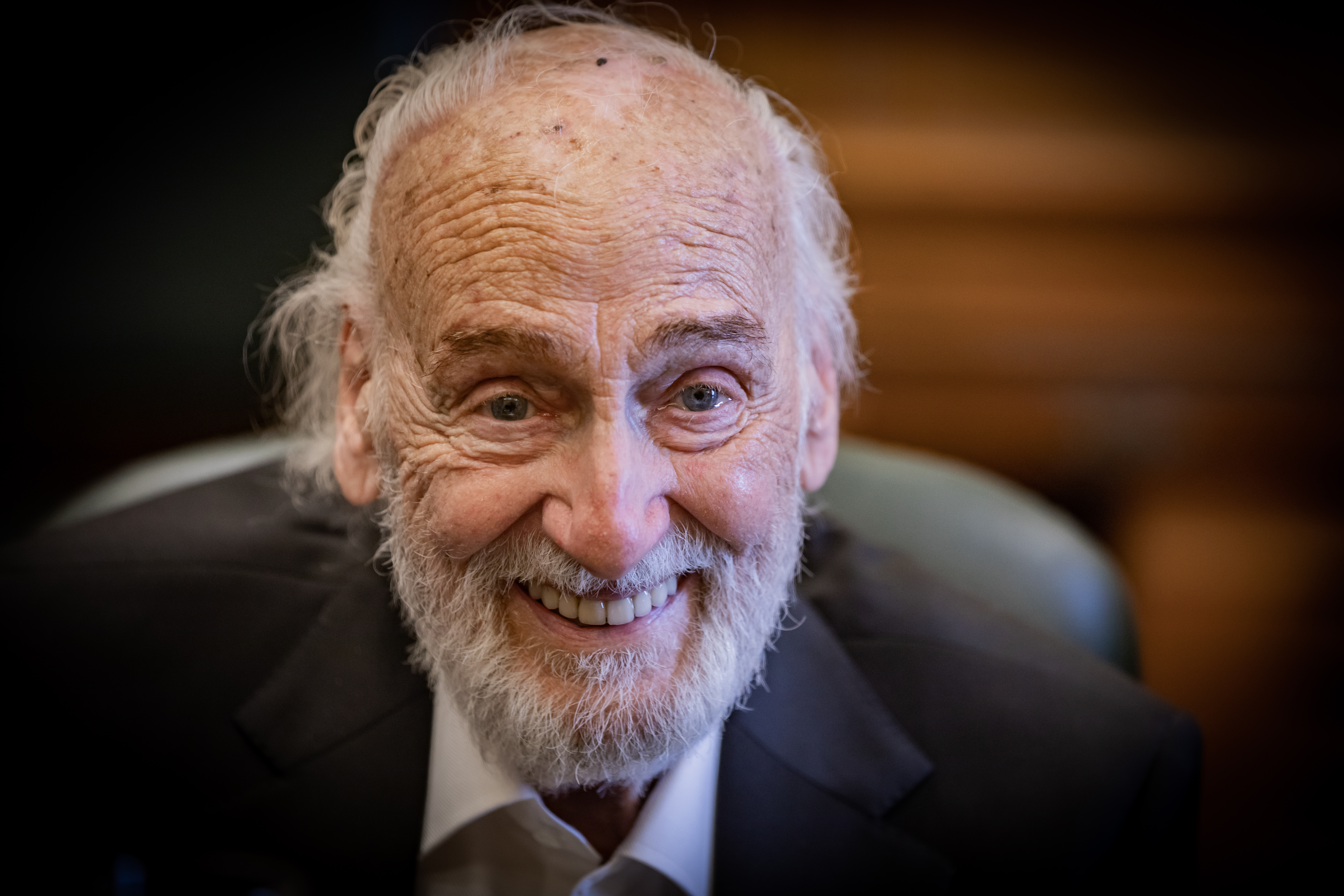
- Alterio in 2023
- Born: 21 September 1929; Buenos Aires, Argentina
- Died: 13 December 2025 (aged 96); Madrid, Spain
- Citizenship: Argentina; Spain
- Occupation: Actor
- Years active: 1948–2025
- Spouse: Ángela Bacaicoa (after 1969)
- Children: 2 (Ernesto, Malena)

Héctor Benjamín Alterio Onorato (21 September 1929 – 13 December 2025) was an Argentine theatre, film and television actor, well known both in Argentina and Spain. His long filmography includes performances in film such as The Truce (1974), Rebellion in Patagonia (1974) To an Unknown God (1977), Trout (1978), The Crime of Cuenca (1980), The Nest (1980), Camila (1984), The Official Story (1985), Wild Horses (1995), Ashes of Paradise (1997), and Son of the Bride (2001).

== Life and career ==
Héctor Benjamín Alterio Onorato was born in Chacarita, Buenos Aires on 21 September 1929, to parents from Carpinone, Italy. Alterio's acting debut came in 1948 in the stage play Cómo suicidarse en primavera ('How to commit suicide in spring'). After finishing drama school, he created the Nuevo Teatro ("New Theatre") company in 1950, where he worked until 1968 and helped change the Argentine theatrical scene of the 1960s.

He also worked in Argentine cinema. His debut on the silver screen took place in Alfredo Mathé's Todo sol es amargo (Every sun is bitter) in 1965. He then participated in many of the most important Argentine movies of the 1970s, including La Patagonia rebelde (The Rebel Patagonia), which was awarded a Silver Bear at the 24th Berlin International Film Festival. His voice was used in Ya es tiempo de violencia (1969), an anonymous film about the Cordobazo riots which took place the same year. The film was produced by Enrique Juárez, close to the Grupo Cine Liberación.

While in Spain in 1975, he received death threats from the Argentine Anticommunist Alliance (Triple A). He decided not to return to Argentina and remained in exile. He also obtained Spanish citizenship.

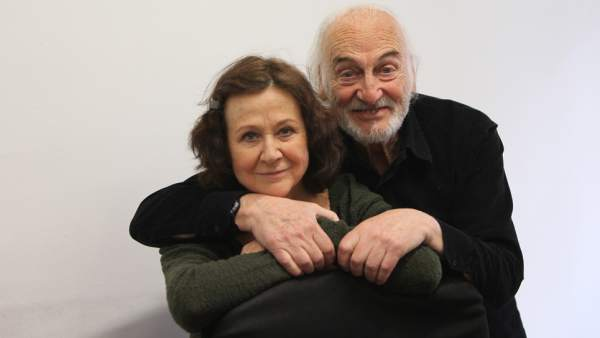
Julieta Serrano and Héctor Alterio in 2011

Consequently, Alterio began to work in Spanish films, including To an Unknown God (1977) and received the Best Actor award at the San Sebastián International Film Festival, and The Nest (1980), for which received the Best Actor award from the Association of Latin Entertainment Critics in 1983.

After the restoration of democracy in Argentina in 1982, Alterio worked in films produced in both countries and some co-productions.

In 2004, he received an Honorary Goya Award for his lifetime body of works.

In a 2007 interview, Alterio declared himself an atheist.

For his last screen appearance, Alterio played a minor role in the television series Su majestad, which premiered in 2025.

Alterio died in Madrid on 13 December 2025, at the age of 96. His lying in repose at the M-30 funeral home was attended by family members and colleagues such as Fernando Tejero, Lola Herrera, Natalia Dicenta, Juan Diego Botto, Luisa Martín, Juana Acosta, Gustavo Salmerón, and Mariano Barroso, among others.

== Roles in Academy Award-nominated films ==
Héctor Alterio has been in five pictures that have been nominated for an Academy Award for Best Foreign Language Film:

- The Truce (1974)
- The Nest (1980)
- Camila (1984)
- The Official Story (1985)
- Son of the Bride (2001)

The fourth of these films won the award at the 58th Academy Awards, and was also nominated for Best Original Screenplay. All of these films, except for The Nest, which was submitted by Spain, have been submitted to the awards by Argentina.

== Selected filmography ==
- Todo sol es amargo (1966)
- Cómo seducir a una mujer (1967)
- Don Segundo Sombra (1969) – Gaucho in Black
- El santo de la espada (1970) – Gen. Simón Bolívar
- La fidelidad (1970)
- El habilitado (1971)
- Argentino hasta la muerte (1971)
- Y que patatín, y que patatán (1971)
- La mafia (1972) – Paolatti
- Paño verde (1973)
- Los siete locos (1973) – Gregorio Barsut
- La Piel del amor (1973) – Luis
- Las Venganzas de Beto Sánchez (1973) – Coronel Sagasti
- Los golpes bajos (1974)
- Quebracho (1974)
- La Patagonia rebelde (1974) – Cmdr. Zavala
- La tregua (1974) – Martín Santomé
- El Amor infiel (1974) – Morales
- Cría Cuervos (1976) – Anselmo
- Pascual Duarte (1976) – Esteban Duarte Diniz
- La menor (1976)
- Fango (1977) – Carlos
- Asignatura pendiente (1977) – Rafa
- Secretos de alcoba (1977) – Carlos
- A un dios desconocido (1977) – José
- La guerra de papá (1977) – Papá (Pablo)
- Marian (1977) – Alfredo
- El mirón (1977) – Roman – husband
- Las truchas (1978) – Gonzalo
- Las palabras de Max (1978) – Julián
- Arriba Hazaña (1978) – Hermano Director
- Borrasca (1978) – Alberto Pineda
- La escopeta nacional (1978)
- ¿Qué hace una chica como tú en un sitio como éste? (1978)
- Serenata a la luz de la Luna (1978)
- Tres en raya (1979) – Padre de Carlos
- Tiempos de constitución (1979)
- F.E.N. (1979) – Alfredo
- Memorias de Leticia Valle (1980) – Alberto
- El crimen de Cuenca (1980) – Isasa
- El Nido (1980) – Don Alejandro
- En mil pedazos (1980) – Armando Novaes
- Tiro al aire (1980)
- Otra vez adiós (1980)
- Los viernes de la eternidad (1981) – Don Gervasio Urquiaga
- Kargus (1981)
- Tac-Tac (1981) – Leonardo Gala
- Volver (1982)
- Asesinato en el Comité Central (1982) – Sepúlveda
- Corazón de papel (1982) – D. Arcadio Nieto
- La vida, el amor y la muerte (1982) – Regino
- Antonieta (1982) – Leon
- Il quartetto Basileus (1983) – Alvaro
- La mujer del juez (1984) – Marcial / Paz's lover
- El señor Galíndez (1984) – Beto
- Camila (1984) – Adolfo O'Gorman
- De grens (1984) – Andras Menzo
- Los chicos de la guerra (1984) – Padre de Pablo
- La rosales (1984)
- Zama (1984)
- Contar hasta diez (1985)
- La historia oficial (1985) – Roberto
- Adiós, Roberto (1985)
- Flesh + Blood (1985) – Niccolo
- A la pálida luz de la Luna (1985) – Miguel Gil de Larios
- Manuel y Clemente (1986) – Serafin
- Puzzle (1986) – Luis
- Contar hasta diez (1986)
- El hombre de la deuda externa (1987) – Pedro
- Sofía (1987) – Padre de Pedro
- Mi General (1987) – General Víctor Mendizábal
- La veritat oculta (1987) – Alfons Garriga
- Barbablu Barbablu (1987) – Federico
- El verano del potro (1989) – Federico
- Continental (1990) – Ruda
- Yo, la peor de todas (1990) – The Viceroy
- Gentile Alouette (1990)
- Don Juan in Hell (1991) – Padre de Don Juan
- Tango (1993) – Feroz Lobo
- as boludas (1993)
- El detective y la muerte (1994) – G.M.
- King of the River (1995) – Juan
- Caballos salvajes (1995) – José
- Tatiana, la muñeca rusa (1995) – Diego
- Cenizas del paraíso (1997) – Judge Costa Makantasis
- Pequeños milagros (1997) – Padre de Rosalía
- Memorias del ángel caído (1997) – Julio
- Asesinato a distancia (1998) – Bilverio Punes
- Diario para un cuento (1998) – Pablo
- Las huellas borradas (1999) – Don José
- Un dulce olor a muerte (1999) – Justino
- Héroes y demonios (1999) – Jorge Romans
- La mujer más fea del mundo (1999) – Dr. Werner
- Suenas en la mitad del mundo – Cuentos ecuatorianos (1999)
- Los libros y la noche (1999, Documentary)
- I Know Who You Are (2000) – Salgado
- Plata quemada (2000) – Losardo
- Esperando al Mesías (2000) – Simón
- Cabeza de tigre (2001) – Santiago de Liniers
- Sagitario (2001) – Gustavo
- El hijo de la novia (2001) – Nino Belvedere
- Vidas privadas (2001) – padre de Carmen ('Carmen's father')
- Nobel (2001) – Alberto
- Noche de reyes (2001) – Sr. Garriga
- Fumata blanca (2002) – Cardinal Giovanello
- El Último tren (2002) – El Profesor
- Apasionados (2002) – Coco
- Kamchatka (2002) – Grandfather
- Nudos (2003) – Cipriano Mera
- Utopía (2003) – Samuel
- Cleopatra (2003) – Roberto
- Le intermittenze del cuore (2003) – Saul Mortara
- Noviembre (2003) – Yuta
- En ninguna parte (2004) – Antonio
- Semen, una historia de amor (2005) – Emilio
- A Tram in SP (2008) – Lucas
- Awaking from a Dream (2008) – Pascual
- Intruders (2011) – Old Priest
- Como estrellas fugaces (2012) – Generale
- Kamikaze (2014) – Lionel
- Fermín glorias del tango (2014) – Fermin
- Las consecuencias (2021) – César padre

== Awards ==
Won:

- Argentine Film Critics Association Awards: Silver Condor for Best Supporting Actor, for La maffia, 1973.
- Donostia-San Sebastián International Film Festival: Prize San Sebastián, Best Actor, for To an Unknown God, 1977.
- Association of Latin Entertainment Critics: Best Actor, for The Nest, 1980.
- Valladolid International Film Festival: Best Actor, for The Last Train, 2002.
- Cinema Writers Circle Awards: CEC Award Best Supporting Actor, for Son of the Bride, 2002.
- Goya Awards: Honorary Goya Award, 2004.
- Max Award for Best Actor, for I, Claudius, 2005

Nominated

- Argentine Film Critics Association Awards: Nominated for four Silver Condors (1998, 2001, 2002, and 2003).
