= Spanish animation =

Animated media made in Spain

Spanish animation refers to animation made in Spain.

== Short films ==
=== Silent era ===
Segundo de Chomón is considered the pioneer of Spanish animation, with the stop-motion shorts he made in France for Pathé starting with La maison hantée (1907).

An animated sequence within family footage on the First Communion of a child called Mercedes Cura is thought to be the first piece of animation made in Spain. For a long time El toro fenómeno (Fernando Marco, 1917), which was lost, was considered the first Spanish animated production, but nowadays El apache de Londres, also lost, is thought to date from 1915, and thus the centenary of Spanish animation was held in 2015.

They were immediately followed by other shorts, including political satires. Starting in 1917 with La apertura de las Cortes: Dato no entiende de indirectas animated sketches were included in newsreels, and that same year Joaquín Xaudaró, the best known Spanish animator from the interwar period, made his first film, Las aventuras de Jim Trot, and in 1920 he created the first Spanish sci-fi-themed animated film, La fórmula del Doctor Nap.

In 1932 Xaudaró founded SEDA, the first animation production company in the country, and the directed its first film, Un drama en la costa, which turned out to be his last film as he died in 1933. The company outlived him briefly, producing three more films: El rata primero, Francisca, la mujer fatal and Serenata. En los pasillos del Congreso, a satire of the Second Republic's politics, was left unfinished. By then other cartoonists were experimenting with animation on their own, like José Escobar with La rateta que escrombrara l'escaleta.

Stop-motion was introduced in Spanish animation by Salvador Gijón in 1935, with Sortilegio vacuno and Españolada. It seemed to catch on, and three films (El intrépido Raúl, Pipo y Pipa en busca de Cocolín and Arte, amor y estacazos) were created by different teams in the following year's first months, but the Civil War's outbreak put a halt to all animated productions.

== Feature films ==
=== Classic era ===
Spain's first animated feature, Garbancito of La Mancha (1945), was the first European cel-animated and non-American color one, using Dufaycolor. It was a fairy tale where an orphan child loosely based in Don Quixote has to save his friends from a giant with the help of his fairy godmother and goat. Its production company, Balet y Blay, made two more features: Happy Vacations (1948) and The Dreams of Tay-Pi (1952).

Through the 1950 new companies were created. Estudios Moro and Estudios Vara produced the main features in subsequent stages of the Francoist era: The Wizard of Dreams (1966) and The Wardrobe of Time (1971). Cruz Delgado, a Moro animator, created his own studio and directed Magical Adventure (1973), while Manuel García Ferré, who had moved to Argentina, created there features such as The Adventures of Hijitus (1973) and Trapito (1975).

At the later stages of this period underground animation took shape, including the first abstract direct cameraless feature ever, José Antonio Sistiaga's Ere erera baleibu icik subua aruaren (1970), and during the transition to democracy the first Spanish feature restricted for adults was released: Stories of Love and Massacre (1979).

=== Modern era ===
In the 1980s the feature production was diversified under the new autonomous system and films based in the local traditions were produced, such as The Magic Pumpkin (Juan Bautista Berasategi, 1985) in Euskadi and Despertaferro (Jordi Amorós, 1990) in Catalonia. "Katy The Caterpillar" (1984) was a coproduction with Mexico and The Town Musicians of Bremen (Cruz Delgado, 1988), spun a popular series, Los Trotamúsicos (1989), was the first animation film prized at the Goya Awards.

Feature production didn't make an impact for most of the 1990s, and only one Goya award was granted in the first half of the decade, for The Return of the North Wind (Maite Ruiz de Austri, 1993). It was however a period of experimentation: Megasónicos (1997) was the first European CGI animation feature, and A Child's Play (Pablo Lloréns, 1999) was the first Spanish stop-motion feature.

Production rose in the following years, and in 2000 four films competed for the Goya Award for the first time. The Living Forest (2001) was the first widely distributed CGI feature, but most films were made in traditional animation for the first half of the decade. While most of them were influenced by American animation, Gisaku (Baltasar Pedrosa, 2005) was branded as the first Spanish anime feature and released at nearly the same time in Japan and Spain.

=== Contemporary era ===
From the second half of the 2000s CGI has been the dominating trend in family features. Many of them were co-productions with other countries, such as Great Britain in Kandor Graphics' The Missing Lynx (2008) and Justin and the Knights of Valour (2013). The most ambitious of these co-productions was Planet 51 (2009), with a $70 million budget. At the same time, Spanish animation co-produced foreign films such as Michel Ocelot's Azur and Asmar (2006).

Some of the most ambitious projects in more recent years were produced just in Spain with the backing of television networks, such as Mediaset in Lightbox Entertainment's Tad, the Lost Explorer (2012) and Capture the Flag (2015). Meanwhile live-action directors Juan José Campanella and Javier Fesser entered the CGI animation field with Underdogs (2013) and Mortadelo and Filemon: Mission Implausible (2014) respectively.

Traditional animation is still used in adult projects. Chico and Rita (Fernando Trueba, 2010) won the European Award and was nominated for the Academy Award, while Wrinkles (Ignacio Ferreras, 2011) was nominated for the European Award and the Annie Award. Lastly, stop-motion has been used for horror features such as Going Nuts (Juanjo Ramírez, 2007) and O Apóstolo (Fernando Cortizo, 2012).

=== List of productions ===
|}

										Prized	Nomin.		
Title	Release	R. time	Technique	Main animation studio	Director	Co-producers	Rating	Budget	Box office	Awards			
Title	Release	R. time	Technique	Main animation studio	Director	Co-producers	Rating	Budget	Box office	Goya	Euro	Oscar	Annie
Garbancito of La Mancha	1945-11-23	98 min.	Traditional	(Catalonia) Balet y Blay	J.M. Blay, A. Moreno			P3.1 million	P3 million				
Happy Holidays	1948-12-27	73 min.	Traditional	(Catalonia) Balet y Blay	J.M. Blay, A. Moreno			P3 million	P1.3 million				
Once Upon a Time...	1950	75 min.	Traditional	(Catalonia) Estela	Alexandre Cirici			P4 million					
The Dreams of Tay-Pi	1952-12-22		Traditional	(Catalonia) Balet y Blay	J.M. Blay, F. Winterstein								
The Wizard of Dreams	1966-12-16	70 min.	Traditional	(Community of Madrid) Moro	Fernando Macián								
Mortadelo y Filemon Festival	1969	80 min.	Traditional	(Community of Madrid) Vara	Rafael Vara				P2.2 million				
Mortadelo y Filemon Second Festival	1970	85 min.	Traditional	(Community of Madrid) Vara	Rafael Vara				P2.5 million				
Ere erera baleibu icik subua aruaren	1970	75 min.	Drawn-on-film		José Antonio Sistiaga								
The Wardrobe of Time	1971	78 min.	Traditional	(Community of Madrid) Vara	Rafael Vara				P40 million				
Magical Adventure	1973-09-06	69 min.	Traditional	(Community of Madrid) Cruz Delgado	Cruz Delgado								
The Attic of Fantasy	1978	75 min.	Traditional	(Community of Madrid) Cruz Delgado	Cruz Delgado								
Stories of Love and Massacre	1979-04-16	88 min.	Traditional	(Catalonia) Equip	Jordi Amorós								
Gulliver's Travels	1983-12-17	82 min.	Traditional	(Community of Madrid) Cruz Delgado	Cruz Delgado			P100 million					
Katy the Caterpillar	1985-07-15	69 min.	Traditional	(Community of Madrid) Moro	J.L. Moro, S. Moro	(Mexico)		P80 million					
The Little Vagabond	1985-07-29	96 min.	Traditional		Manuel Rodjara								
The Magic Pumpkin	1985	90 min.	Traditional		Juanba Berasategi								
Town Musicians of Bremen	1989-06-26	86 min.	Traditional	(Community of Madrid) Cruz Delgado	Cruz Delgado				P20 million				
Peraustrinia 2004	1990-04-06	75 min.	Traditional	(Catalonia) Marimón	Ángel García								
Despertaferro	1990-12-05	75 min.	Traditional	(Catalonia) Equip	Jordi Amorós	(Germany)							
The Legend of the North Wind	1992	69 min.	Traditional	(Basque Country (autonomous community)) Eskuz	J. Berasategi, M. Ruiz de Austri, C. Varela			P150 million					
The Return of the North Wind	1993	72 min.	Traditional	(Basque Country (autonomous community)) Eskuz	Maite Ruiz de Austri								
Megasónicos	1997-12-19	85 min.	CG animation	(Basque Country (autonomous community)) Baleuko	J. González, J. Martínez								
Ahmed, the Prince of Alhambra	1998-06	68 min.	Traditional	(Basque Country (autonomous community)) Lotura	Juanba Berasategi								
¡Qué vecinos tan animales!	1998-09-04	69 min.	Traditional	(Extremadura) Extra	Maite Ruiz de Austri								
Goomer	1999-07-09	75 min.	Traditional	(Catalonia) Merlín	J.L. Feito, C. Varela								
A Children's Game	1999-10	74 min.	Stop-motion	(Valencian Community) Potens	Pablo Llorens			P48 million					
The Thief of Dreams	1999-12-15	70 min.	CG animation	(Basque Country (autonomous community)) Dibulitoon	Ángel Alonso			P130 million					
The Island of the Crab	2000-10-02	68 min.	Traditional	(Basque Country (autonomous community)) Irusoin	T. Basterretxea, J. Muñoz			P130 million					
Marco Antonio: Hong Kong Rescue	2000-12-01	78 min.	Traditional	(Catalonia) Merlín	M.J. García, C. Varela								
The Living Forest	2001-08-03	82 min.	CG animation	(Galicia (Spain)) Dygra	Á. de a Cruz, M. Gómez			€3 million	€2 million				
10 + 2: The Great Secret	2001-08-17	85 min.	Traditional	(Catalonia) Acció	Miquel Pujol								
A Dog Called Pain	2001-11-16	90 min.	Traditional		Luis Eduardo Aute								
The Legend of the Unicorn	2001-12-21	70 min.	Traditional	(Extremadura) Extra	Maite Ruiz de Austri			P200 million					
The King of the Farm	2002-06-21	95 min.	Trad. / CG / live-action	(Basque Country (autonomous community)) Bainet	G. Muro, C. Zabala								
The Warriors of the Apocalypse	2002-08-14	80 min.	CG animation	(Community of Madrid) Ovidio DVD	Jesús M. Montané								
Time Gate	2002-11-29	80 min.	Traditional	(Community of Madrid) Animatoons	Pedro E. Delgado								
Dragon Hill	2002-12-20	80 min.	Traditional	(Andalusia) Milímetros	Ángel Izquierdo			€3 million					
Anjé, the Pyrenaic Legend	2002	67 min.	CG animation	(Basque Country (autonomous community)) Baleuko	Juanjo Elordi								
El embrujo del Sur	2003-07-04	89 min.	Traditional	(Basque Country (autonomous community)) Lotura	Juanba Berasategi			€1.2 million					
Betizu Among the Stars	2003-10-31	71 min.	CG animation	(Basque Country (autonomous community)) Baleuko	Egoitz Rodríguez								
El Cid: The Legend	2003-12-19	90 min.	Traditional	(Galicia (Spain)) Filmax	Raúl del Pozo			€8 million	€2.6 million				
The Three Wise Men	2003-12-19	76 min.	Traditional	(Community of Madrid) Animagic	Antonio Navarro			€7.2 million	€2.3 million				
Pinocchio 3000	2004-02-09	79 min.	CG animation	(Canada) CinéGroupe	Daniel Robichaud	(Canada) (France)		$12 million	$15 million				
The Balunis in the Adventure in the End of the World	2004-03-19	88 min.	CG animation	(Basque Country (autonomous community)) Baleuko	Juanjo Elordi								
Glup, una aventura sin desperdicio	2004-04-02	73 min.	Traditional	(Basque Country (autonomous community)) Dibulitoon	A. Arregi, I. Berasategui			€1.2 million					
Supertramps	2004-12-01	79 min.	CG animation	(Basque Country (autonomous community)) Dibulitoon	Íñigo Berasategi, Jose Mari Goenaga			€1.2 million					
Arensivia's Death	2005	85 min.	Traditional	(Catalonia) El Jueves	Maikel García								
Gisaku	2005-03-04	81 min.	Traditional	(Galicia (Spain)) Filmax	Baltasar Pedrosa			€4 million	€133,000				
The Monstruous Adventures of Zipi and Zape	2005-03-09	80 min.	Traditional	(Community of Madrid) BRB	Claudio Biern Boyd								
Midsummer Dream	2005-07-01	98 min.	CG animation	(Galicia (Spain)) Dygra	Ángel de la Cruz, Manolo Gómez	(Portugal)		€6 million	€1.5 million				
Olentzero and the Magic Trunk	2005-12-23	82 min.	CG animation	(Basque Country (autonomous community)) Baleuko	Juanjo Elordi			€1.3 million					
The Warrior Without a Name	2006-04-07	90 min.	CG animation	(Community of Madrid) Tornasol	David Iglesias			€2.3 million					
PayaS.O.S. ¡¡¡al rescate!!!	2006-12-29	70 min.	Traditional	(Basque Country (autonomous community)) Lotura	Imanol Zinkunegi								
De Profundis	2007-01-19	75 min.	Traditional		Miguelanxo Prado			€1.5 million					
Klaus	2018		Traditional										

== Television animation ==
=== Classic era ===
Animation first appeared on Televisión Española (TVE) in commercials and spots. The most famous short was José Luis Moro's Familia Telerín (1964), which was used to tell children it was time to go to bed. Its characters went on to star in the 1966 The Dream Wizard feature directed and produced by Francisco Macián.

In 1968, Cruz Delgado created for TVE the first Spanish animated series, Microbio. One year before, émigré animator Manuel García Ferré had created in Argentina the Hijitus series.

=== Modern era ===
Cruz Delgado's series Don Quixote of La Mancha (1979–81) was the first large success in Spanish animation for television, which boosted in the following years.

BRB Internacional, –founded by Claudio Biern Boyd, José Luis Rodríguez and Títo Bastoas– and TVE co-produced Ruy, the Little Cid (1979), Around the World with Willy Fog (1984) –both with animation made by Nippon Animation–, and The World of David the Gnome (1985). BRB Internacional also produced Dogtanian and the Three Muskehounds (1981) –with animation by Nippon Animation–.
