= Pepita Pardell =

Pioneer of animated cinema in Spain (1928–2019)

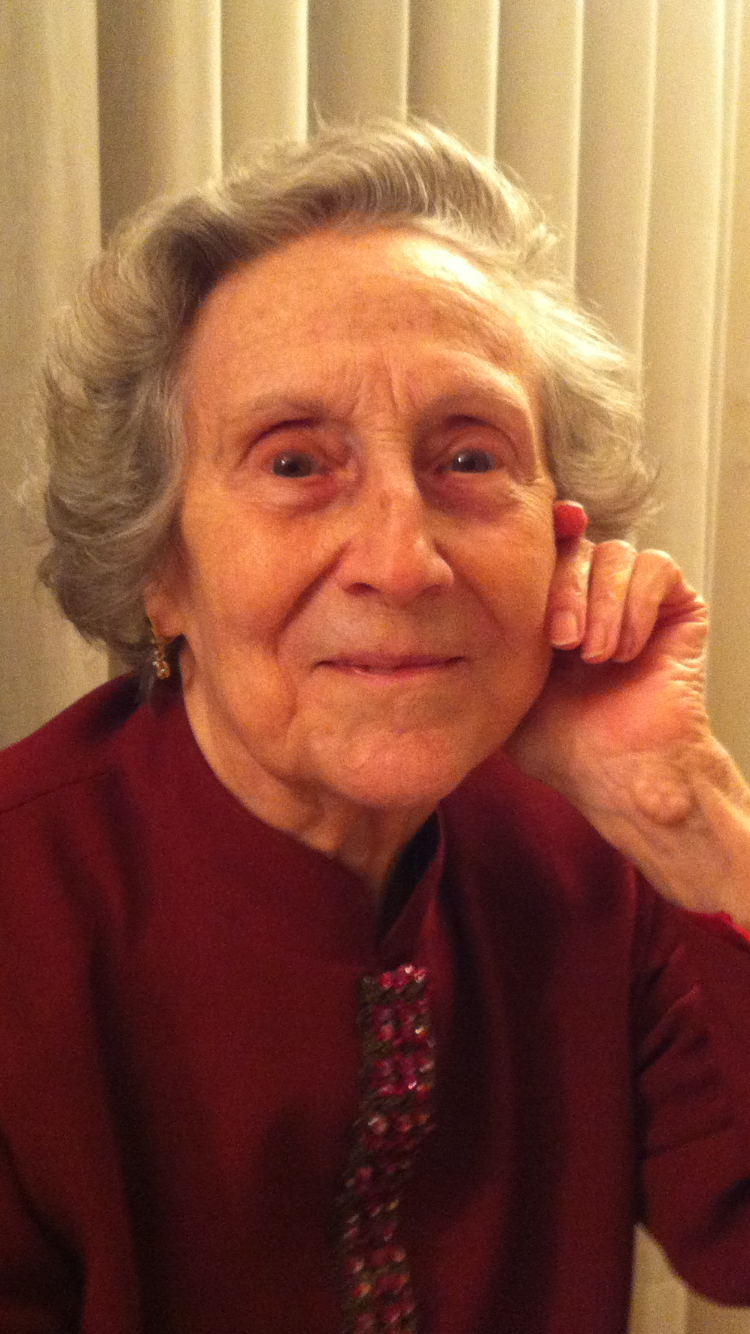
Pepita Pardell (2017)

Pepita Pardell Terrade (16 March 1928 – 11 July 2019) was a Spanish animator, cartoonist, illustrator, and painter. She was a pioneer of animation cinema in Spain. In 1945, she worked on the first animated film, in color, in Europe. Pardell was awarded the Creu de Sant Jordi in 2018.

== Biography ==
Pepita Pardell Terrade was born in Barcelona on 16 March 1928. At the age of fourteen, Pardell told her mother that she didn't want to be a shop assistant (a traditional job for a girl of her age, at that time). Her father, from whom she inherited a passion for drawing, let Pardell study at Escola de la Llotja. Her grandfather, Josep Pardell Mateu, worked with Antoni Gaudí.

Pardell began her career in the field of animation in 1944, when she worked for the production company Balet y Blay and was part of the Garbancito de la Mancha team (1944), which was the first animated feature film in Spain and the first European film of color cartoons, directed by Arturo Moreno. At Balet and Blay, she also participated in the creation of Alegres vacaciones (1948) and Los sueños de Tay-Pi (1952).

From 1951 to 1962, Pardell worked as an illustrator, drawing comic books for Ediciones Toray. In 1962, she went to work for the animation producer Estudios Buch-Sanjuán. Subsequently, she affiliated with Publivisión, Pegbar Productions, Equipo, and Cine Nic. Throughout her long career, Pardell worked with directors such as Robert Balser and Jordi Amorós.

Pardell died in Barcelona on 11 July 2019.

== Filmography ==
- 1945: Garbancito de la Mancha
- 1948: Alegres Vacaciones
- 1952: Los sueños de Tay-pi
- 1975: La doncella guerrera
- 1978: Yogi's Space Race
- 1979: El león, la Bruja y el Armario
- 1983: The Charlie Brown and Snoopy Show (series de televisión)
- 1984: Goldilocks and the Three Bears
- 1986: Mofli, el último Koala
- 1990: Despertaferro

== Awards and honors ==
- 2016, Trajectory prize, Animac
- 2018, Honorary Member, Catalan Film Academy
- 2018, Creu de Sant Jordi
- 2019, Vila de Gràcia Premi, Individual Prize of Honor
