= List of animated feature films of the 1940s =

A list of animated feature films released in the 1940s.

== List ==
Title	Country	Director	Production company	Animation technique	Notes	Release date
1940
Pinocchio	United States	Ben Sharpsteen; Hamilton Luske; Norman Ferguson; T. Hee; Wilfred Jackson; Jack Kinney; Bill Roberts	Walt Disney Productions	Traditional	Won 2 Academy Awards for Best Original Song for "When You Wish Upon A Star", and for Best Original Score.	February 7, 1940
Fantasia	United States	Various	Walt Disney Productions	Traditional/live action	First animated feature, and first feature film to be presented in stereophonic surround sound. Won 2 special Academy Awards.	November 13, 1940
1941
The Reluctant Dragon	United States	Alfred Werker (live action); Hamilton Luske (animation)	Walt Disney Productions	Traditional/Live action	Package film/Documentary	June 21, 1941
Dumbo	United States	Ben Sharpsteen	Walt Disney Productions	Traditional		October 23, 1941
Princess Iron Fan; Tie shan gong zhu	China	Wan Guchan; Wan Laiming		Traditional	First Chinese animated feature, and the first animated feature from Asia.	November 19, 1941
Mr. Bug Goes to Town	United States	Dave Fleischer; Shamus Culhane	Fleischer Studios	Traditional	Last animated feature made in the United States before the attack on Pearl Harbor, launching the United States into World War II.	December 5, 1941
1942
Bambi	United States	David Hand	Walt Disney Productions	Traditional		August 9, 1942
Saludos Amigos	United States	Norman Ferguson; Wilfred Jackson; Jack Kinney; Hamilton Luske; William Roberts	Walt Disney Productions	Traditional/Live action	Package film	August 24, 1942
15 mil dibujos	Chile	Jaime Escudero		Traditional	Lost film	December 24, 1942
1943
Victory Through Air Power	United States		Walt Disney Productions	Traditional	Documentary	July 17, 1943
1944
The Three Caballeros	United States	Norman Ferguson	Walt Disney Productions	Traditional/Live action	Package film	December 21, 1944
1945
The Lost Letter; Propavshaya gramota	Soviet Union	Lamis Bredis; Zinaida Brumberg; Valentina Brumberg	Soyuzmultfilm	Traditional	First traditional full-length animated film for USSR and Soyuzmultfilm studio	January 1, 1945
Momotaro: Sacred Sailors 桃太郎 海の神兵 (Momotarō: Umi no Shinpei)	Japan	Mitsuyo Seo	Shōchiku Dōga Kenkyūjo	Traditional	First Japanese animated feature.	April 12, 1945
Handling Ships	United Kingdom	Alan Crick; John Halas	Halas and Batchelor	Stop motion	Instructional film, and the first British animated feature.	June 22, 1945
Anchors Aweigh	United States	George Sidney		Traditional/Live Action		July 19, 1945
Ziegfeld Follies	United States	Lemuel Ayers; Roy Del Ruth; Robert Lewis; Vincente Minnelli; George Sidney		Traditional/Live Action		August 13, 1945
The Enchanted Sword; Garbancito de La Mancha (Chickpea from La Mancha)	Spain	Arturo Moreno	Balet y Blay	Traditional	First Spanish animated feature and the first animated feature film produced in color outside of the United States.	November 23, 1945
1946
Make Mine Music	United States	Jack Kinney; Clyde Geronimi; Hamilton Luske; Joshua Meador; Robert Cormack	Walt Disney Productions	Traditional	Package film, and the first American animated feature to be made after World War II.	April 20, 1946
The Tinderbox; Fyrtøjet	Denmark	Svend Methling	Dansk Farve- og Tegnefilm	Traditional	First Danish animated feature.	May 16, 1946
Holiday in Mexico	United States	George Sidney		Traditional/Live Action		August 15, 1945
Song of the South	United States	Harve Foster; Wilfred Jackson	Walt Disney Productions	Traditional/Live action		November 12, 1946
1947
The Humpbacked Horse; Konyok-Gorbunok	Soviet Union	Ivan Ivanov-Vano	Soyuzmultfilm	Traditional		January 10, 1947
The Crab with the Golden Claws; Le crabe aux pinces d'or	Belgium	Claude Misonne		Stop motion	First Belgian animated feature.	January 11, 1947
Fun and Fancy Free	United States	Jack Kinney (animation); Bill Roberts (animation); Hamilton Luske (animation); William Morgan	Walt Disney Productions	Traditional/Live action	Package film	September 27, 1947
The Czech Year; Spalicek	Czechoslovakia	Jiří Trnka		Stop motion	First Czech animated feature.	December 13, 1947
1948
Melody Time	United States	Jack Kinney; Clyde Geronimi; Hamilton Luske; Wilfred Jackson	Walt Disney Productions	Traditional/Live action	Package film	May 27, 1948
So Dear to My Heart	United States	Harold D. Schuster; Hamilton Luske	Walt Disney Productions	Traditional/Live action		November 29, 1948
Water for Fire Fighting	United Kingdom	Alan Crick; John Halas		Stop motion	Instructional film	November 5, 1948
Happy Holidays; Alegres vacaciones	Spain	José María Blay; Guido Leoni; Arturo Moreno		Traditional		December 27, 1948
1949
The Emperor's Nightingale; Cisaruv slavík	Czechoslovakia	Jiří Trnka; Miloš Makovec		Stop motion/Live action		April 15, 1949
Alice in Wonderland	France	Dallas Bower		Stop motion/Live action		May 13, 1949
The Dynamite Brothers; I fratelli Dinamite	Italy	Nino Pagot		Traditional	First Italian animated feature.	August 22, 1949
The Adventures of Ichabod and Mr. Toad	United States	Jack Kinney; Clyde Geronimi; James Algar	Walt Disney Productions	Traditional	Package film	October 5, 1949
The Singing Princess; La Rosa di Baghdad (The Rose of Baghdad)	Italy	Anton Gino Domenighini		Traditional		December 22, 1949
Adventures of Esparadrapo	Spain	Ángel de Echenique		Stop motion		December 26, 1949

== Highest-grossing animated films of the decade ==
Rank	Title	Studio	Release Year	Gross	Ref
1	Bambi	Walt Disney Productions	1942	$267,000,000	
2	Pinocchio	Walt Disney Productions	1940	$164,000,000	
3	Fantasia	Walt Disney Productions	1940	$83,320,000	
4	Song of the South	Walt Disney Productions	1946	$65,000,000	
5	Anchors Aweigh	Walt Disney Productions	1945	$7,500,000	
6	Ziegfeld Follies	Walt Disney Productions	1945	$5,344,000	
7	So Dear to My Heart	Walt Disney Productions	1948	$4,275,000	
8	The Three Caballeros	Walt Disney Productions	1944	$3,355,000	
9	Make Mine Music	Walt Disney Productions	1946	$3,275,000	
10	Fun and Fancy Free	Walt Disney Productions	1947	$3,165,000	
