= Jordi Mestre =

Spanish actor and model (1981–2020)

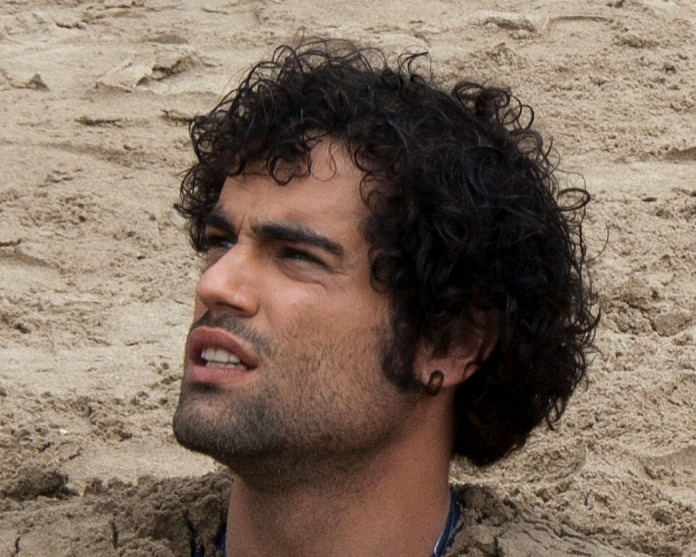
- Mestre in 2011
- Born: Jordi Mestre Molina; 14 September 1981; Esplugues de Llobregat, Province of Barcelona, Spain
- Died: 6 June 2020 (aged 38); Madrid, Spain
- Education: Rose Bruford College
- Occupations: Actor; model
- Years active: 2007–2019
- Website: www.jordimestre.es

Jordi Mestre Molina (14 September 1981 – 6 June 2020), best known as Jordi Mestre, was a Spanish actor and model, who became famous for his work as reporter on the successful, former Spanish TV show Sé lo que hicisteis....

== Early life ==
Mestre was born in Esplugues de Llobregat and graduated from the Institut del Teatre ('Theatre Institute' of Barcelona). He obtained a master's degree at Rose Bruford College of Speech and Drama in London.

== Career ==
Apart from several forays into film ("Ushima Next" directed by Joan Frank Charansonnet and Jesus Manuel Montane, where he played the character of a psychologist), theatre ("Data de Caducitat" by Paolo Duarte, or "Behind" by Stephen Levy), and into short-films ("Illusion", "Hand", directed by Ramon Llull University of Barcelona, and "Adiccions" directed by graduates of Ites school), he starred in the Global Campaign for Nivea.

Jordi co-starred in a promotional shot-film of Larios 12, along with Malena Costa, in June 2011. In July 2011, he participated as co-star, along with Alexandra Jiménez, in Vega (singer)'s music video "Como yo no hay dos".

In 2012 he became part of the cast of "Entre Lineas", where he played the character of Maxi.

=== Television ===
In 2007, Jordi participated in the series "La vía Augusta", where he played a Roman. A dramatic series of twelve one-hour episodes introducing the characters in a world of passion, power struggles, intrigue, desire and love.

On 7 January 2011, TV producer Globomedia posted on their Twitter account that there would be an exclusive casting to find the first male reporter on "Sé lo que hicisteis..." . Producer and TV-show confirmed the casting would take place on 18 January at Teatro Calderón of Madrid. After casting, the show announced their five finalists: Rodrigo H. Recio, Mestre, Alexis Santana, Jurro and Jon Postigo, of which only one would be the reporter of the program. On 14 February 2011, Jordi was confirmed as the new reporter of the show, which ended on 20 May 2011, after five years and 1010 programs broadcast.

=== Modeling career ===
He has worked as a model for trademarks such as Lois (es), Nivea and Adidas, and as well as fashion editorials such as Cosmopolitan, Zero, Marie Claire (Turkey) and Men's Health (Greece). In 2009, he worked with magazine Vanity Gay, in a casual photo shoot, along with Hugo Iglesias and Marc Pina Sala. Since spring 2011, Jordi became the male protagonist of Lois Jeans's new campaign. This campaign was inspired by the original and legendary film Planet of the Apes. He was also the image of the known firm of elegant costumes, Grisby. He starred in the main line and the ceremonies' line, "Grisby Ceremonies" during the same period.

In July 2011, Mestre participated, along with many familiar faces, such as Sandra Blázquez, from the TV series Física o Química, in a New Faces 2011 photo shoot, by Must Magazine!, which offers a new edition every summer. He was also photographed for "Pop Me Magazine"'s cover, in their 7th issue, offering a large and varied photographic report.

== Death ==
Mestre died in a traffic accident in Madrid on 6 June 2020, after colliding with a lamppost while riding his motorcycle.

== Filmography ==
=== Television ===
- La via Augusta, en (TV3 (Catalonia)), (2007)
- BCN Live, (pilot) (Mediapro), (2009)
- Se lo que hicisteis... en (La Sexta) (2011).
- Entre Líneas (pilot) (2012).

=== Film ===
- "Ushima Next" directed by Joan Frank Charansonnet and Jesús Manuel Montané.

=== Theatre ===
- "Ventdavall", directed by Jordi Basora. 2007
- "Skyline", directed by Jordi Vilà.
- "Data de Caducitat", directed by Paulo Duarte.
- "Detrás", directed by Stephan Levy.
- "Pedro y el capitán", by Mario Benedetti.
