= The Lady and the Reaper =

- Directed by: Javier Recio Gracía
- Written by: Javier Recio Gracía
- Produced by: Antonio Banderas; Manuel Sicilia; Enrique Posner; Antonio Meliveo; Juan Molina; Marcelino Almansa
- Music by: Sergio de la Puente
- Production companies: Kandor Graphics; Green Moon
- Release date: October 2009 (Granada Festival)
- Running time: 8 minutes
- Country: Spain
- Budget: € 650,000

The Lady and the Reaper (Spanish: La dama y la Muerte) is a 2009 Spanish 3D imaging animated short film created by Javier Recio Gracía and produced by Kandor Graphics and Green Moon. It was nominated for an Academy Award for Best Animated Short Film and won the Goya Award for Best Animated Short of 2009. It was also included in the Animation Show of Shows.

== Plot ==
An old lady, who lives alone in the countryside, is looking forward to death so that she may reunite with her deceased husband. When the Reaper finally arrives and she is about to enter the afterlife, she is snatched away from the Reaper by a smug doctor. The Reaper and the doctor fight fiercely, and eventually medicine wins. The impatient Reaper leaves, but the lady is not willing to postpone the encounter with her husband, electrocuting herself with the defibrillator in water, much to the Reaper's dismay and anger.
