= Gabriel Arnao Crespo =

- Gabriel Arnao Crespo ("Gabi"), circa 1970s
- Born: Gabriel Arnao Crespo; November 23, 1922; Madrid, Spain
- Died: April 2, 1985 (aged 62); France
- Other names: Gabi
- Occupations: Comics artist, cartoonist, illustrator
- Years active: 1943–1985
- Employer(s): Flechas y Pelayos, Chicos, Maravillas magazine, Trinca comic, Tartine et Tartinet
- Known for: Parodic humor and absurdist style
- Notable work: Sherlock López y Watso de Leche, Jim Erizo, Bloupy
- Movement: Franco-Belgian comics tradition

Gabriel Arnao Crespo (Madrid, November 23, 1922 – April 2, 1985), better known as Gabi, was a comic artist from Spain who lived most of his life in France.

== Biography ==
=== Childhood and youth (1922–1948) ===
Gabriel Arnao made his debut in Maravillas magazine in 1943 with the series El Tigre Brown. From 1943 to 1949, for the comic Flechas y Pelayos, he developed the series Sherlock López y Watso de Leche, a parody of the detective created by Conan Doyle.

In Chicos, he published four long adventures starring Jim Erizo.

=== Stay in France (1949–1985) ===
Gabi emigrated to France in 1949, working for SFPI (Société française de presse illustrée). There, he revived his series Jim Erizo for the magazine Balalín (1958) and Sherlock López y Watso de Leche for Tartine et Tartinet (1959) and Dennis the Menace (1968).

He also created several episodes specifically for the Spanish magazine Trinca in 1971.

His last series was Bloupy, which appeared from 1983 onward in Amis-Coop.

== Style ==
Gabriel Arnao demystified genres through the use of absurdity, somewhat in the manner of Jacovitti, with a light graphic style of straight, clear lines.

== Works ==
- 1943 – Tigre Brown, for Flechas y Pelayos
- 1943 – Las extrañas aventuras de Sherlock López y Watso de Leche, for Flechas y Pelayos
- 1943 – El Señor Conejo, for Maravillas magazine
- 1944 – El Pequeño Profesor Pin y su ayudante Freddy, for ¡Zas!
- 1947 – Jim Erizo y su Papá, for Chicos
- 1948 – Teobaldo Teodolito, for Pulgarcito
- 1948 – Pototo y Boliche, for Chicos
- 1949 – Cleopatro Pa, for Chicos
- 1949 – El Mago Parapapato y su sobrino Patato, for Mis Chicas
- 1949 – Puck, el gnomo, for Mis Chicas
- 1949 – Don Ataúlfo Clorato y su sobrino Renato, for Trampolín magazine
- 1950 – Mateo Pí, for Trampolín
- 1950 – Pedrín y Linda, for Trampolín
- 1953 – Ojo de Castor, el pequeño piel roja, for Trampolín
- 1957 – El pequeño chico Fredy, for Maravillas
- 1958 – Archibaldo, for Baladín
- 1983 – Galapo y Vendaval, for Super Zipi y Zape.

== Bibliography ==
- Jesús Cuadrado (2000). Atlas español de la cultura popular: De la historieta y su uso 1873–2000. Madrid: Ediciones Sinsentido / Fundación Germán Sánchez Ruipérez. 2 vols. ISBN 84-89384-23-1.
- Antoni Guiral, Antoni (2007). Los tebeos de nuestra infancia: La Escuela Bruguera (1964–1986). Colección Magnum no. 7. Legal Deposit: B-50353-2007. Barcelona: Ediciones El Jueves, S.A. ISBN 978-84-9741-589-7.
