= Justin and the Knights of Valour =

- Spanish theatrical release poster
- Spanish: Justin y la espada del valor
- Directed by: Manuel Sicilia
- Written by: Matthew Jacobs; Manuel Sicilia
- Story by: Manuel Sicilia
- Produced by: Marcelino Almansa; Antonio Banderas; Kerry Fulton; Ralph Kamp; Sergio Pablos
- Starring: Freddie Highmore; Antonio Banderas; James Cosmo; Charles Dance; Tamsin Egerton; Rupert Everett; Barry Humphries; Alfred Molina; Mark Strong; David Walliams; Julie Walters; Olivia Williams; Saoirse Ronan
- Narrated by: Freddie Highmore; James Cosmo
- Cinematography: Javier Fernández
- Edited by: Claudio Hernández
- Music by: Ilan Eshkeri
- Production companies: Aliwood Mediterráneo Producciones; Kandor Graphics; Out of the Box Features
- Distributed by: Entertainment One Films (United Kingdom); Sony Pictures Releasing de España (Spain); ARC Entertainment (United States)
- Release dates: 13 September 2013 (United Kingdom); 20 September 2013 (Spain)
- Running time: 96 minutes
- Countries: Spain; United Kingdom; United States
- Language: English
- Budget: $30 million
- Box office: $19 million

Justin and the Knights of Valour (Spanish: Justin y la espada del valor) is a 2013 animated fantasy film whose working title was Goleor: The Scales and the Sword. It tells the story of a boy named Justin, who wants to become a knight like his grandfather Sir Roland. The film was produced, created, developed, and animated by Kandor Graphics, the second of their two animated films (the first was the 2008 film, The Missing Lynx). It was produced by Antonio Banderas, Marcelino Almansa, Kerry Fulton, and Ralph Kamp, and written by Matthew Jacobs and Manuel Sicilia with music by Ilan Eshkeri. It was edited by Claudio Hernández and directed by Manuel Sicilia. Sony Pictures Entertainment distributed it in Spain, and Entertainment One in the United Kingdom.

The film premiered on 13 September 2013. It received negative reviews, criticizing the writing, characters, and pacing, though the voice acting and music received praise. It flopped at the box office, only grossing $19 million off a $30 million budget. Rotten Tomatoes reported a 13% approval rating for the film with an average rating of 3.93/10 based on 15 reviews.

== Plot ==
Justin lives in the kingdom of Gabylonia and dreams of becoming a Knight of The Valour Kingdom like his grandfather, Sir Roland. However, knights were outlawed and replaced by lawyers after the King's death. Justin's father Reginald, the Queen's Chief Lawyer, grew to hate knights following Roland's death and insisted Justin become a lawyer. Justin notices that Roland's sword is missing and decides to go on a quest to find it. His grandmother Lilly tells him to go to the Tower of Wisdom to receive training. Before departing, Justin visits his crush, Lara, a spoiled nobleman's daughter, hoping to receive a token of luck. Lara is so self-absorbed she barely notices him and gives him a dirty sock which Justin swears to return after completing his quest.

Justin heads to the traditional quest starting point, the Broken Eagle Inn, but finds it has become a fast-food restaurant. There he meets weary barmaid Talia and talentless wizard Melquiades. Justin attempts to defend Talia from the inn's bullying guards, Igor and Slamski, causing her to develop a crush on him.

Sir Heraclio, the knight who killed Justin's grandfather, returns from exile and recruits an army of criminals to seek retribution on the Queen and Reginald for outlawing knights. The Queen fears she made a mistake outlawing knights as there is no one to defend the kingdom. Clorex, an armour polisher and opportunistic thief, overhears the Queen and steals armour to pose as a knight. Styling himself Sir Clorex he begins residing at the Broken Eagle, charging customers money for his autograph. Talia is threatened by her boss to keep quiet as Clorex is good for business.

Justin finds the tower and trains with monks Braulio & Legantir and knight Sir Blucher. Blucher informs Justin that Heraclio stole his grandfather's sword after killing him. For his final test, Justin must face a dragon, but as dragons are extinct he faces Gustav, an alligator fitted with mechanical wings and a flamethrower. The test goes wrong and Justin is near-fatally injured. The monks end the training early and send Justin home but Blucher gives Justin his sword.

Justin returns to the Broken Eagle to see Talia. Igor and Slamski eagerly start another fight with Justin. Tired of Clorex and the Inn, Talia helps Justin defeat them and quits her job, but she is disheartened when she learns that Justin has feelings for Lara.

At Lara's coming-of-age party, Justin finds Lara has fallen in love with Clorex. Heraclio's men attempt to kidnap Lara for ransom, but they are scared away by Clorex who they believe to be a real knight. Having embarrassed himself and failed as a knight Justin returns home with his father. Wanting the ransom money Clorex kidnaps Lara and delivers her to Heraclio. Talia finds Justin preparing to go to university to become a lawyer and informs him of Lara's kidnapping. Determined to do the right thing Justin decides to rescue Lara and Reginald finally accepts Justin's decision to become a knight.

Melquiades leads Justin and Talia to Heraclio's hideout, where they find Lara. Seeing Justin fight, Lara develops a crush on him. Justin and Talia are surrounded but decide to fight to the end with Justin admitting he is happy Talia came with him. Blucher arrives in time with Gustav who scares away the army while Blucher duels Heraclio. Talia confronts Clorex with his cowardice and lies, defeats him in a fistfight, and then rescues Lara after that. Heraclio wounds Blucher before dueling Justin. Justin succeeds in disarming Heraclio and recovering his grandfather's sword. Heraclio is almost victorious but Justin sends him falling from a waterfall to his death.

The Queen knights Justin as Sir Justin and both she and Reginald decide to re-establish the knights. Lara passes out when, rather than proposing to her, Justin keeps his promise and returns her dirty sock in front of the entire kingdom. He then asks Talia to continue coming on adventures with him as he has fallen in love with her and she accepts by kissing him.

At their tower, Braulio, Legantir, and Blucher erect a statue of Justin next to the statue of his grandfather and unveil a new hall awaiting the statues of the next generation of knights.

== Cast ==
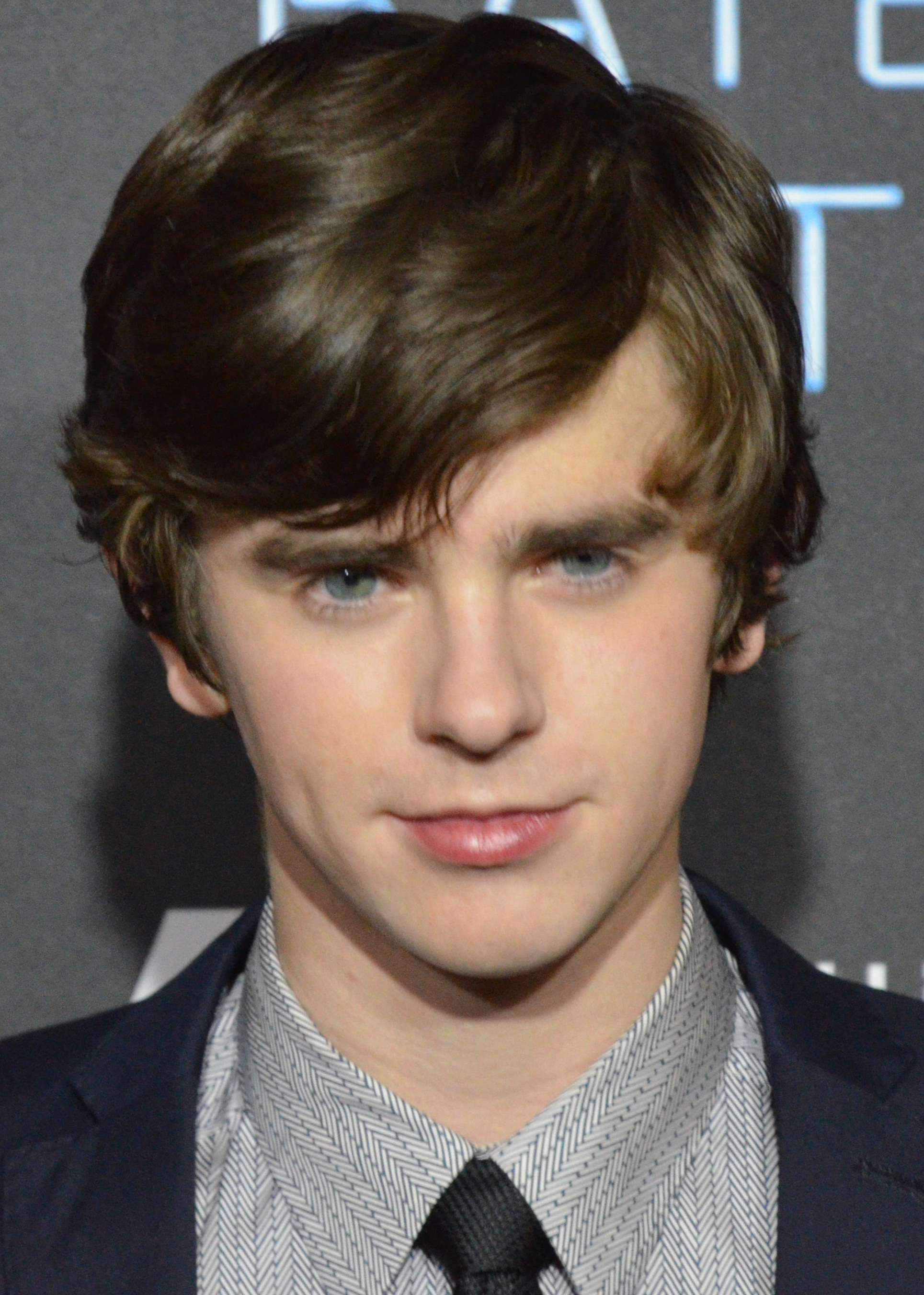
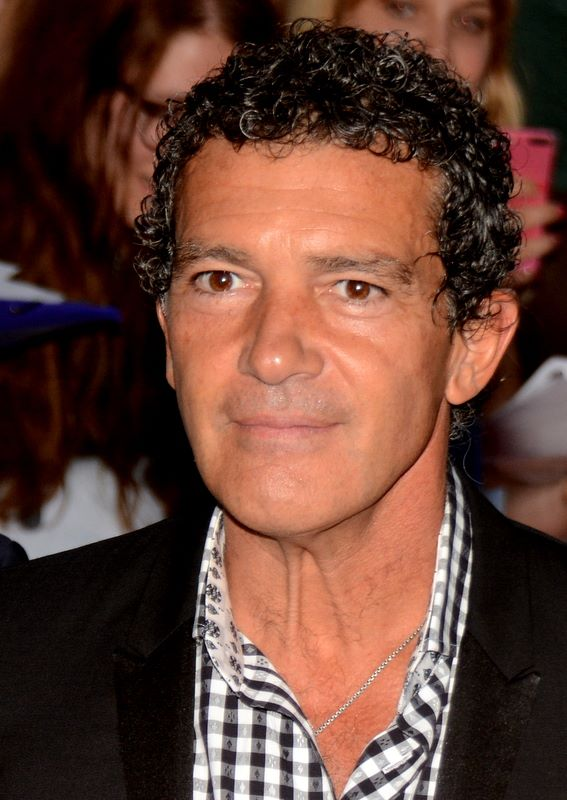
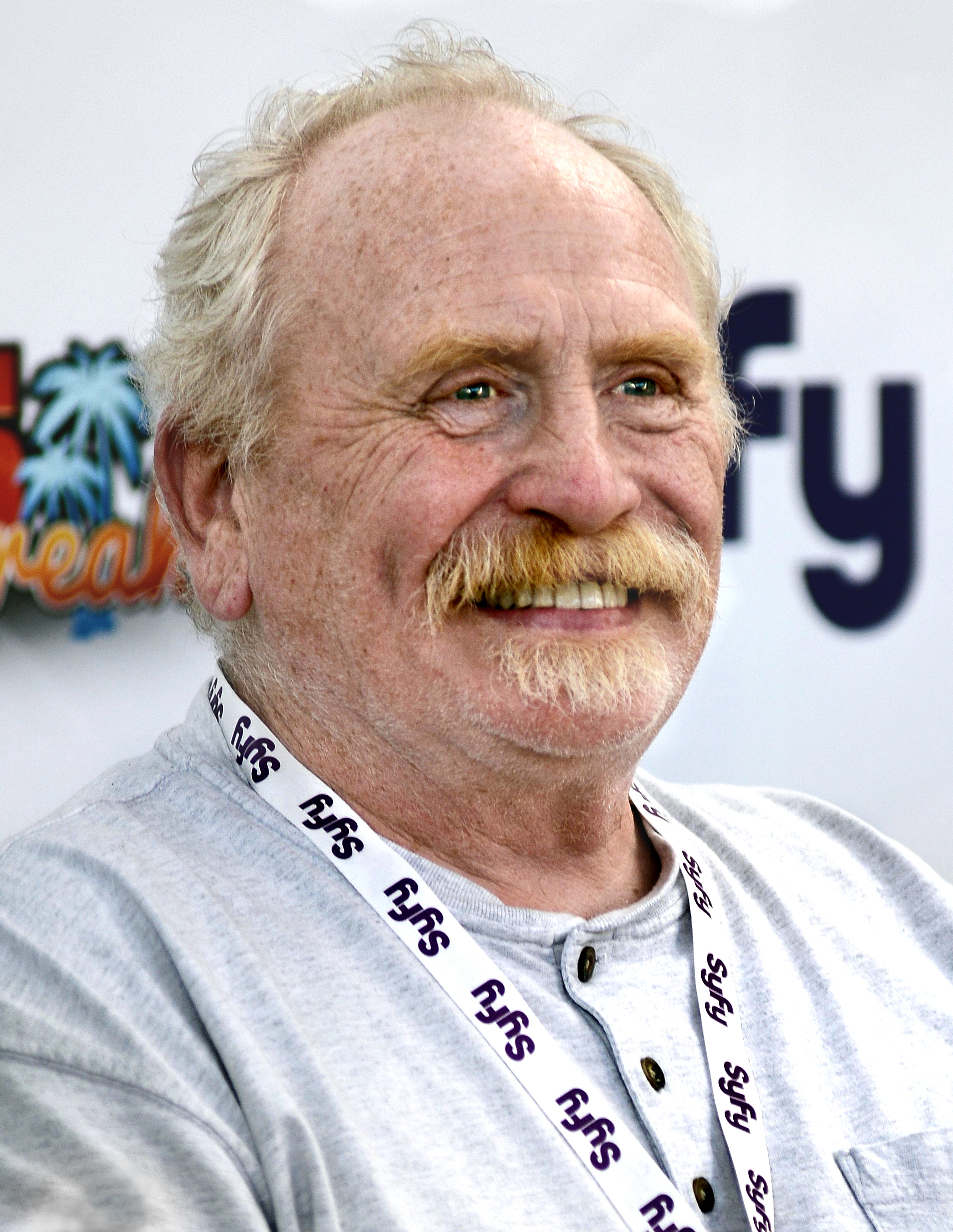
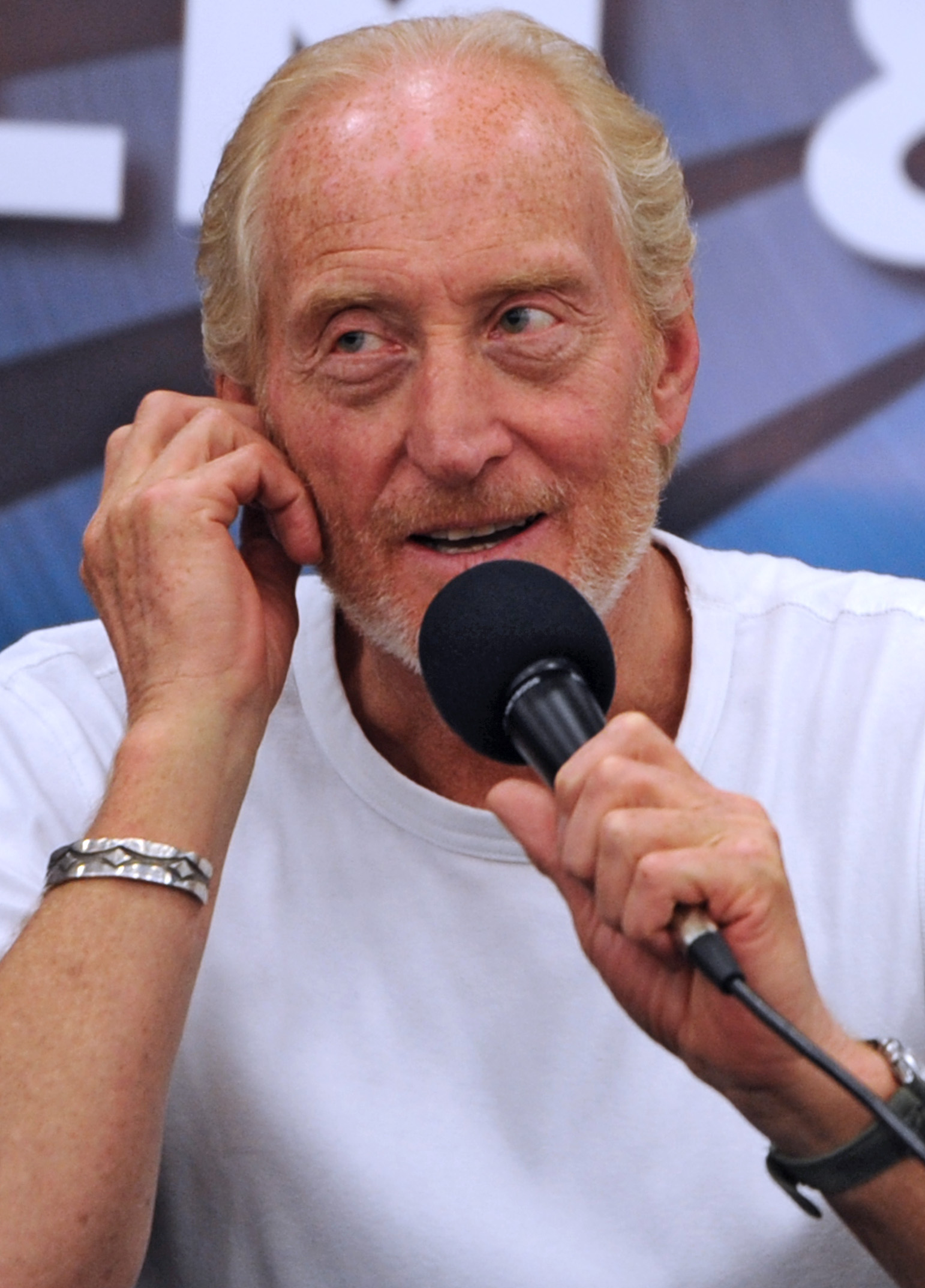
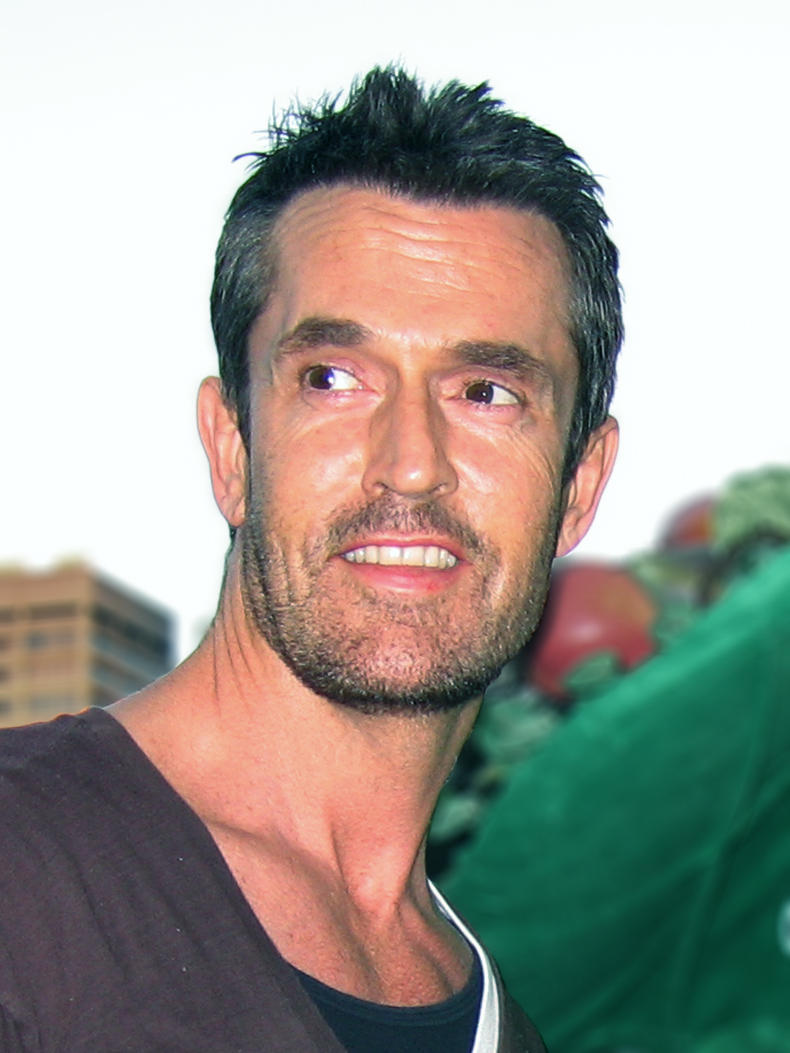
Freddie Highmore, Antonio Banderas, James Cosmo, Charles Dance and Rupert Everett starred in the film.
- Freddie Highmore as Justin, a teenage boy who dreams of becoming a knight like his grandfather before him. Justin soon sets out on a quest to achieve his dream. He is shy, lacks confidence, has a slight build, and is clumsy, but is also brave, determined, true of heart, smart, and rather handsome.
- Saoirse Ronan as Talia, a teenage girl and former barmaid who comes from a large family of many older brothers. Tired of her job and seeking the thrill of adventure Talia joins Justin, eventually becoming her best friend and falling deeply in love with him. She is beautiful with long brown hair, is skilled at fighting, is quick-witted, loves adventure, and cares for others greatly.
- James Cosmo as Blucher, one of the monks, a former knight and Sir Roland's best friend.
- Charles Dance as Legantir, the wise head monk and wizard.
- Tamsin Egerton as Lara, Justin's former crush and the daughter of the kingdom's pioneer economic. She has blonde hair, has many dresses and makeup, and is rather selfish and insensitive to others' feelings.
- Antonio Banderas as Clorex, an armour polisher and thief who poses as a knight for fame and money.
- Rupert Everett as Sota, a vain but skilled swordsman who serves Heraclio as his right-hand man. He has two brothers he bullies constantly.
- Barry Humphries as Braulio, a monk and inventor. He suffers from a nervous condition that causes seizures when stressed or upset, especially during Justin's training.
- Alfred Molina as Reginald, Justin's father. He is the chief lawyer of the kingdom and vehemently against knights. He wishes for his son to become a lawyer like him.
- Mark Strong as Heraclio, a former knight who betrayed his kingdom and murdered Sir Roland. He blames the Queen and Reginald for ruining his life by outlawing knights.
- David Walliams as Melquiades / Karolius, a quirky wizard with a bizarre split personality that prevents him from using magic as neither personality likes the other or can agree on anything. Both personalities accompany Justin and Talia on their travels as it is the one thing they agree on.
- Julie Walters as Grandma Lilly, Justin's grandmother and Reginald's mother. She supports Justin in his desire to be a knight and strongly disagrees with Reginald outlawing knights. She is good friends with the Queen.
- Olivia Williams as the Queen of Gabylonia, the governor of the kingdom. Following her husband's murder, she outlawed all knights, hoping to prevent any future conflict, but now realizes her actions have left her kingdom and people with none to defend them.
- Richard O'Brien as Innkeeper of the Broken Eagle Inn, an angry businessman who only cares about money. He allows his guards, Igor and Slamski, to bully Talia and customers alike. He is the main cause of Talia quitting her job to adventure with Justin.
- Lloyd Hutchinson as Champ, Sota's giant brother who bears most of Sota's bullying due to his low intelligence. He switches sides and aids Justin and Talia after Justin treats him with kindness. Hutchinson also voices Igor, a guard at the Broken Eagle Inn.
- Stephen Hughes as Copas, Sota's cheerfully drunk brother who owns a horse, Skipper, that thinks it is a dog.
- Matt Wilkinson as Slamski, Igor's twin brother, another guard at the Broken Eagle Inn.
- Michael Culkin as Sebastien, Lara's butler.

== Reception ==
On review aggregator Rotten Tomatoes, 13% of 15 reviews are positive, and the average rating is 3.9/10.
