= Familia Telerín =

- Frame from the original 1964 animated short Familia Telerín, showing the characters during the “¡Vamos a la cama!” ("let's go to bed") sequence.
- Genre: Children's television
- Created by: Santiago Moro; José Luis Moro
- Theme music composer: Máximo Baratas and Antonio Areta
- Opening theme: "¡Vamos a la cama!"
- Country of origin: Spain
- Original language: Spanish
- No. of seasons: 2
- No. of episodes: 18

Production
- Running time: 1 minute (1964); 2–4 minutes (2015)

Original release
- Network: Televisión Española
- Release: 1964 – 2017

Familia Telerín ("Telerín Family") is a Spanish television series broadcast by Televisión Española that signaled the end of children's programming and the beginning of adult programming on the Spanish TV. It was created in 1964 by brothers Santiago and José Luis Moro. The animation is on 20th place in "Top 50 Spanish Cultures" established in 2008.

== Concept ==
Each evening, the original 1964 short animated sequence appeared on screen—at 7:30 p.m. in winter and 8:00 p.m. in summer—to tell children that it was time to go to bed. Several versions were produced, first in black and white and later in color. The Telerín Family was composed of six children: Cleo, Teté, Maripí, Pelusín, Coletas, and Cuquín. {{Infobox person

== Legacy ==
The series was a major success among children in the 1960s. It was broadcast not only in Spain but also in Mexico, Chile, El Salvador, Venezuela, Argentina, and Uruguay. Merchandise based on the Telerín Family included sticker albums, notebooks, storybooks, clocks, handkerchiefs, and plastic dolls. A comic strip adaptation appeared in the magazines Din Dan (by Editorial Bruguera) and Anteojito by Manuel García Ferré, illustrated by Blas Sanchis.

== Adaptations ==
=== Film ===
In 1966, the characters starred in their own feature film, El mago de los sueños ("The Wizard of Dreams").

=== Spinoff ===
In 2018, a new 3D-animated series titled Cleo & Cuquín premiered, and it's a modern reboot of the original concept. It was produced by Ánima Kitchent for RTVE and later acquired by Netflix for international distribution. It airs in Latin America on Discovery Kids, in Spain on Clan TV, and in Mexico on Mexiquense TV (Channel 34, part of the Sistema Mexiquense de Medios Públicos) as part of the program "Bim Bam Bum", as well as on Canal 5 and its official YouTube channel.

== Episodes ==
=== Season 1 (1964 — 2007) ===
1. Vamos a la cama (1964)
2. Vamos a la cama (Casera Cola, 1992)
3. Vamos a la cama (Casera Cola No.2, 1992)
4. Vamos a la cama (1998)
5. Vamos a la cama (2007)

=== Season 2 (2015 — 2017) ===
1. Vamos a la cama (2015)
2. Vamos a la cama (2017)

=== Extras ===
1. El mago de los sueños (1966)
2. Hora del planeta (2015-2019)
3. Lala (2015)
4. Cleo & Cuquin (2018-2020)
5. Colgate (2019)

== See also ==
- Television in Spain
- Spanish animation
