= Maravillas (magazine) =

- Cover of Maravillas no. 530 (c. 1950s), illustration by José Luis Moro.

Publication information
- Publisher: JNPP of FET y de las JONS
- Schedule: Weekly
- Format: Horizontal and vertical
- Genre: Comics, Children's literature, Puzzles
- Publication date: 1939 – 1954
- No. of issues: 705

The Maravillas magazine (title in Spanish meaning "Wonders") was originally published as a supplement to the children's magazine "Flechas y Pelayos", linked to the Spanish fascist Falange Española Tradicionalista y de las JONS. It was issued weekly from 1939 to 1954, reaching a total of 705 regular issues and 10 almanacs. Over time, it evolved from a supplement into an independent children's comic magazine.

== History ==
In its early phase as a supplement to Flechas y Pelayos, Maravillas used a horizontal format and, like its parent magazine, was published by the Delegación Nacional del Frente de Juventudes under the direction of friar Justo Pérez de Urbel.

Among its contributors was the poet Gloria Fuertes—for example, her comic strip "No hay mal que dure siempre" ("No evil lasts forever") appeared on the cover of issue no. 82 (3 April 1941).

From issue 500 onward, the magazine switched to a vertical format and gained wider distribution as a children's supplement to the newspaper Arriba. It eventually became a standalone children's comic book magazine (from issue 618 to 705).

== Contents ==
Maravillas featured short comics for younger readers, paper doll cut-outs, tales, and poems—most notably Gloria Fuertes's Historias de Coleta ("Stories of Coleta").

Artists who contributed to the magazine included José Luis Moro (whose early work showed clear Walt Disney influence and who later created the Familia Telerín), José Alcaide Irland, Maria Claret, Gabriel Arnao Crespo, Ardel, and Vázquez, among others.

== Bibliography ==
- Cerrillo, Pedro C. and Jaime García Padrino (1995). El niño, la literatura y la cultura de la imagen. Ediciones de la UCLM.ISBN 8488255861
- García Padrino, Jaime (2001). Así pasaron muchos años: entorno a la literatura infantil española. Ediciones de la UCLM.ISBN 9788484271352
- Viviane Alary (2002). Historietas, comics y tebeos españoles. Presses Universitaires du Mirail – Hespérides Espagne, Université de Toulouse Le Mirail. ISBN 9782858166060
