= We Are Balboa =

Spanish rock band

- Origin: Madrid, London
- Genres: Rock; punk-rock; power pop; indie rock
- Years active: 2003–2009
- Labels: Flair Records, PIAS
- Members: Lua Ríos: vocalist and rhythm guitar Carlos del Amo: lead guitar David Leandro: drummer Jose Mora: bassist
- Website: www.myspace.com/wearebalboa

We Are Balboa are a Spanish rock band.

== History ==
They started out in 2003, under another name, Balboa. May 2003 saw the release of their first album, and they opened for Mudhoney and Maná.

In 2005 they decided to change their name and have, since then, been known as We Are Balboa. They won the final of the Spanish edition of Global Battle of the Bands in December, coming first out of 40 bands. It was at their London Astoria gig that they met Jon Gray who (having produced The Coral, The Zutons, The Kooks, Editors, Radio 4, The Subways) went on to produce the band's latest album, Space Between Bodies. The album was mastered by Kevin Metcalf (of Oasis, Supergrass, The Kinks and Rufus Wainwright fame) at Soundmasters Studios, London.

Prior to the album being released in Spain, the album's first track and single was chosen as the closing theme to an ITV GRANADA show.

They toured England throughout Fall 2007.

== Discography ==
=== Studio albums ===
- Space Between Bodies (2007)

Flair Records, distribuided by PIAS. Songs by Carlos del Amo and Lua.

1. "Space Between Bodies" (2:32)
2. "Wink" (2:44)
3. "It’s All Been Done" (3:00)
4. "Some Places" (4:27)
5. "Don’t Make Me Waste My Time" (2:01)
6. "Say You Love Me" (2:53)
7. "Same Rates" (2:34)
8. "Flavour" (3:44)
9. "Down" (2:18)
10. "Lady" (2:29)
11. "Give Me Some" (3:12)
12. "Saturday Night" (2:16)

=== Singles ===
- "Space Between Bodies" (2007)
