= The Missing Lynx =

2008 Animated film

- Spanish theatrical release poster
- Directed by: Raul Garcia; Manuel Sicilia
- Written by: Raul Garcia; Manuel Sicilia; Jose E. Machuca
- Story by: Raul Garcia; Manuel Sicilia
- Produced by: Antonio Banderas; Marcelino Almansa; Juan Molina; Manuel Cristobal
- Starring: Abraham Aguilar; Beatriz Berciano; Carlos del Pino; David García; Steven Hughes; Conchi López Rojo; Julio Núñez; Esperanza Pedreño; David Robles
- Cinematography: David Cabrera; Joaquín Catalá; Javier Fernández
- Edited by: Claudio Hernández; Nacho Ruiz Capillas
- Music by: Sergio De La Puente
- Production companies: Kandor Graphics; Perro Verde Films; Green Moon; YaYa! Films; Canal Sur Televisión; Televisión de Galicia (TVG) S.A. Etb (Euskal Telebista); Televisión Pública de Canarias; 7 Región de Murcia; Instituto de Ciencias y Artes Cinematográficas del Ministerio de Cultura; Instituto de Crédito Oficial (ICO); Consejería de Cultura y Medio Ambiente de la Junta de Andalucía; Cajasol
- Distributed by: Filmax
- Release dates: September 29, 2008 (Animadrid); December 25, 2008 (Spain)
- Running time: 100 minutes
- Countries: United Kingdom; Spain
- Languages: English; Spanish
- Budget: $6.5 million
- Box office: $1.4 million

The Missing Lynx (Spanish: El Lince perdido) is a 2008 animated adventure action comedy film produced by Spanish studios Kandor Graphics and YaYa! Films and producer Antonio Banderas. The film is directed by Raul Garcia and Manuel Sicilia, and written by them and Jose E. Machuca. It is presented by Banderas himself. With the film released in Spain on December 25, 2008 in Spanish, it was released in the United States on March 9, 2012 in English. The film is about a group of animals from Doñana National Park in Spain, trying to save other animals kidnapped by the bad guys. The movie takes place in the natural parks of Andalusia. The film was developed using servers supplied by Kandor. The Missing Lynx received mixed reviews from internet audience polls and it earned $1.4 million on a $6.5 million budget. The Missing Lynx was released on DVD in October 15, 2009 by Aurum Productions.

== Plot ==
After one of his countless mishaps, Félix (Felix in the English version), a clumsy and unlucky Iberian lynx, is transported to the animal recovery shelter at the Doñana National Park, along with Beeea (Beeety in the English version), a daredevil Iberian ibex, and Astarté, a brave peregrine falcon with an injured wing. However, the national park has undergone security measures while Félix was gone. Mysterious animal kidnappings have occurred at other national parks and animal preservations, which had caused the shelter to be turned into a prison-like structure, leading Félix's paranoid chameleon friend, Gus, to believe that their human caretakers are in a conspiracy to keep the animals locked up for experiments. While the others are skeptical of Gus' claims, a female lynx, Lincesa (Lynxette in the English version), is brought to the shelter; she and Félix begin to form an attraction to each other.

In the dead of night, the shelter is infiltrated by mercenaries led by Newmann, the self-titled "greatest hunter in the world", hired by an eccentric millionaire, Noé (Noah in the English version), who has created a sort of Noah's Ark for threatened species. Due to the antics of two bumbling mercenaries, Félix is able to escape from his cage and free his friends from the transport trucks, with the exception of Lincesa being hit with a sedative dart by Newmann. With some encouragement, Astarté is able to fly back to the shelter and set off the alarm, alerting the humans to their disappearance. Félix and his friends set out to find the kidnapped animals and stop Noé's plans, later accompanied by their mole friend, Rupert, who escaped from the ship. They enlist a pack of wolves to help them evade Newmann and the pursuing mercenaries, but the wolves are caught, along with a few other animals, and Félix starts to believe that it's his bad luck to blame for them being followed. They meet Diogenes, a vulture with a mission to clean the environment, who supplies the group with materials to build a makeshift transport to outrun the mercenaries. Félix however abandons the group to protect them from his bad luck.

On Noé's ship, Lincesa discovers that Noé has the ability to speak with animals. He tells her that he was once locked up in an insane asylum for claiming to talk with animals, but after being released, he used his communication skills to amass a large fortune (e.g., horses at the racetrack, moles finding oil pockets underground, fish guiding him to sunken treasure). His plan to collect endangered animals and bring them to an island refuge is his way of thanking them by saving them from extinction, for helping build his fortune. "What's the point in being free if you're not alive?", he tells Lincesa, but she turns his words on him saying, "What's the point in being alive if you're not free?" After hearing this and being reminded of how terrible it was for him to be locked up, Noé becomes disillusioned with his plan.

After Félix finds Rupert, who had mysteriously disappeared, it turns out that Rupert is responsible for Newmann and the mercenaries tracking them. After the events at the animal center, Noé implanted Rupert with a microchip and set him free in hopes of finding the escaped animals, in exchange for the safety of Rupert's family (moles aren't endangered, after all). Realizing that it's not his bad luck to blame, Félix returns to his friends in time to save them from being caught by Newmann. The hunter underestimates Félix, and this results in him being scratched in the face by the lynx. He becomes mad with rage at this, and attempts to fire a lethal shot at Félix, but is interrupted by a call from Noé, telling him to call off the hunt immediately. Further enraged, Newmann decides to take over the ship, lock Noé in a cage, and set up traps in the ship's hangar for Félix.

While Gus and Beeea free Noé from his cage, Newmann tries to draw Félix to him using Lincesa as bait. Unexpectedly, Newmann causes an explosion that starts to flood the ship, beginning an evacuation protocol of the caged animals. While fighting Newmann, Félix has an epiphany that, by holding on to the hunter, he will be prone to injury by his own traps, thanks to Félix's bad luck. This leads to Newmann seemingly crushed to death by a large trap. Félix, Lincesa, the animals, and Noé make it to safety in life rafts.

Afterwards, Felix and Lincesa have a cub, and have Gus present it to the other animals (à la Lion King). The film ends with the two incompetent mercenaries, now working for the shelter, arguing over whether they have seen the lynx before.

In a mid-credits scene, it is shown that Newmann actually survived his encounter at the ship, but now has a fear of cats.

== Cast ==
- Abraham Aguilar as Gus
- Beatriz Berciano as Lincesa (Lynxette in English)
- Carlos del Pino as Rupert
- David García as Soldado Gardo
- Steven Hughes as Newmann
- Conchi López Rojo as Astarté
- Julio Núñez (in memoriam) as Noé (Noah in English), later voiced by Roberto Cuenca
- Esperanza Pedreño as Patty
- David Robles as Félix (Felix in English)

== Production ==
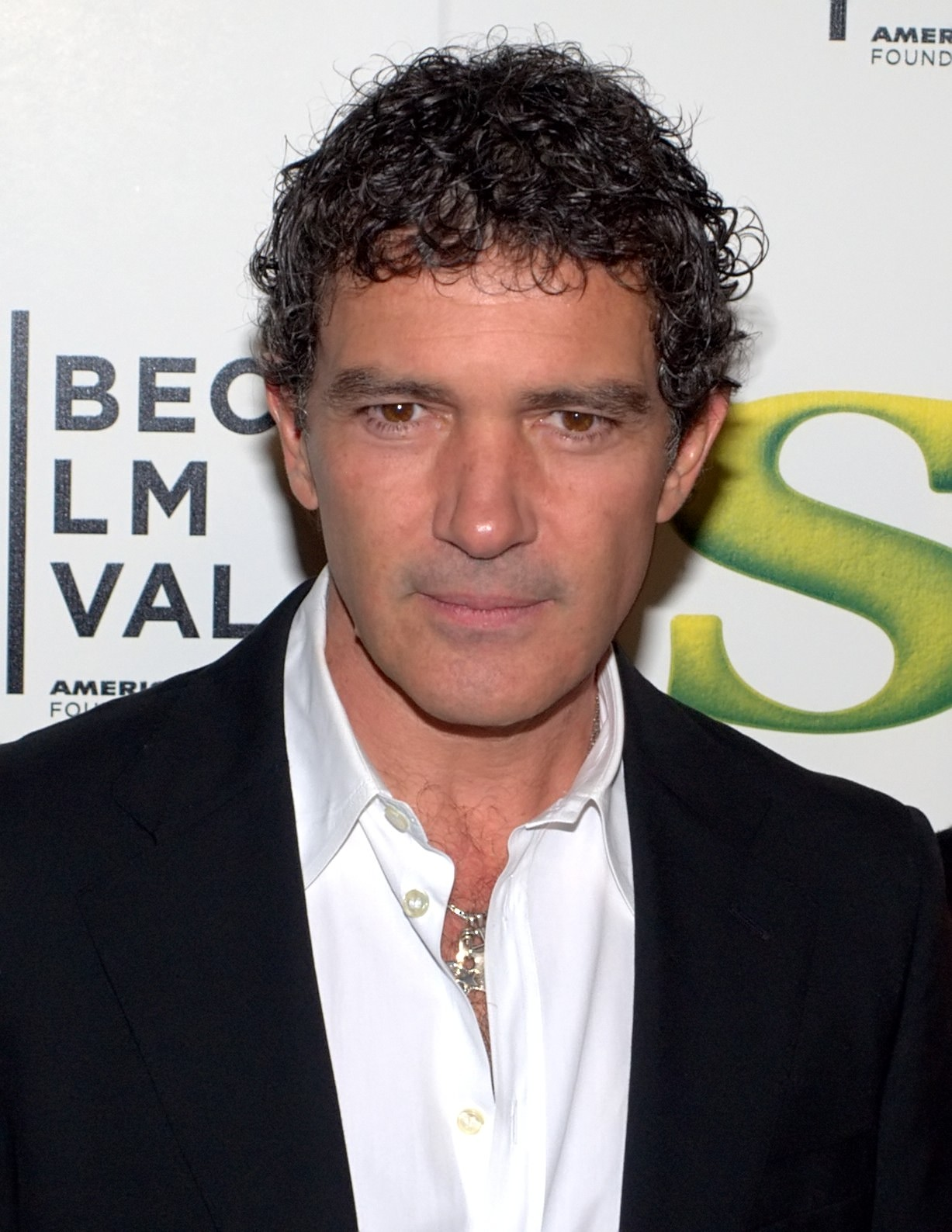
Antonio Banderas is the film's producer.

In March 2005, Raul Garcia and Manuel Sicilia were hired and set to write and direct The Missing Lynx. Jose E. Machuca co-wrote the script for the film. Antonio Banderas, Marcelino Almansa, Juan Molina and Manuel Cristobal produced the film with the budget of $6,500,000 for release in 2008. Abraham Aguilar, Beatriz Berciano, Carlos del Pino, David García, Steven Hughes, Conchi López Rojo, Julio Núñez, Esperanza Pedreño and David Robles joined the film in 2006. Sergio De La Puente composed the music for the film. Development and storyboarding of the film was completed in Madrid, Spain. Production then moved to London, England for the final phases of animation, lighting, color and production in order to maximize tax credits offered to foreign film projects in the United Kingdom. On September 22, Aurum Productions and Phase 4 Films acquired distribution rights to the film.

== Release ==
The film was theatrically released on December 25, 2008 by Aurum Productions and Phase 4 Films and was released on DVD in October 15, 2009 by Aurum Productions.

== Music ==
The film's score was composed by Sergio de la Puente. The soundtrack also contains "Not My Day", performed by Yuri Mendez and "Space Between Bodies", performed by the Spanish rock band We Are Balboa.

== Awards ==
Animacor - International Animation Festival, Spain 2008

Award	Nominee
Special Mention	Won

Goya Awards 2009

Award	Category	Nominee
Goya	Best Animation Film (Mejor Película de Animación)	Won

San Diego Latino Film Festival 2009

Award	Category	Nominee
Jury Award	Best Film	Won
