= Jordi Amorós =

Spanish cartoonist and animator (1944–2026)

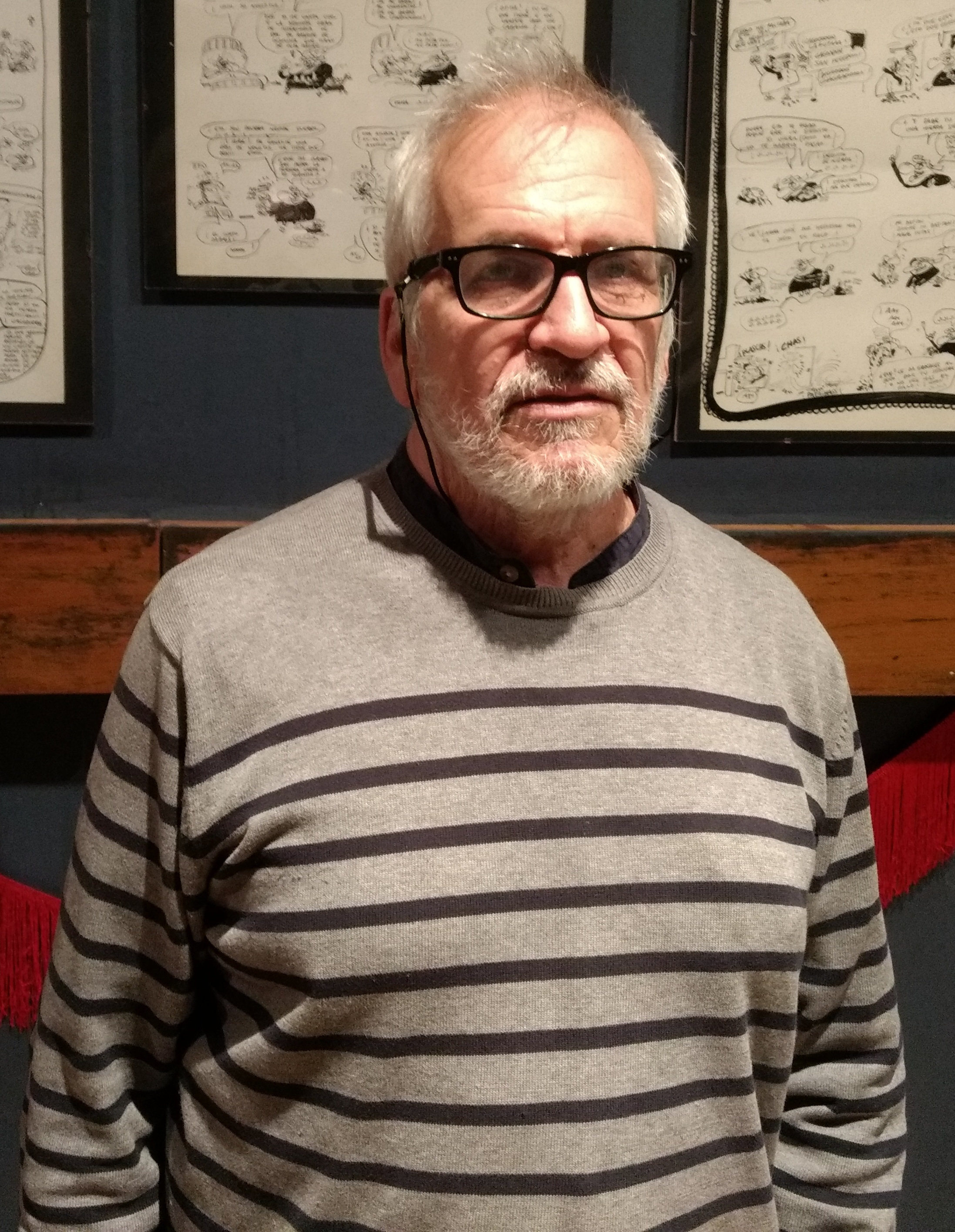
- Born: Jordi Amorós i Ballester; 7 April 1944; Barcelona, Spain
- Died: 24 May 2026 (aged 82); Vic, Spain
- Other name: Ja
- Occupations: Cartoonist, animator
- Notable work: Encuesta; Historias de amor y masacre Sor Angustias de la Cruz; Obispo Morales

Jordi Amorós i Ballester (7 April 1944 – 24 May 2026), also known as Ja, was a Spanish cartoonist and animator, who worked for magazines such as El Papus and El Jueves, author of satirical comics series like Encuesta (1976) and Obispo Morales (2006).

== Life and career ==
Jordi Amorós i Ballester was born in Barcelona, Spain on 7 April 1944. In animation, he directed Histories of Love and Slaughter (1979; the first Spanish adult animated film), Mofli, el último koala (1986) and Despertaferro (1990).

Jordi Amorós died on 24 May 2026, at the age of 82.
