= Francisco Macián =

Spanish animator

Francisco Macián Blasco (born 1 November 1929 in Barcelona, died 23 October 1976) was a Spanish animator. In 1969 he patented an animation technique he called "M-Tecnofantasy", which is similar to rotoscopy.

== Works ==
- El mago de los sueños - 1966
