= 15 mil dibujos =

Chilean animated film

15 Mil Dibujos
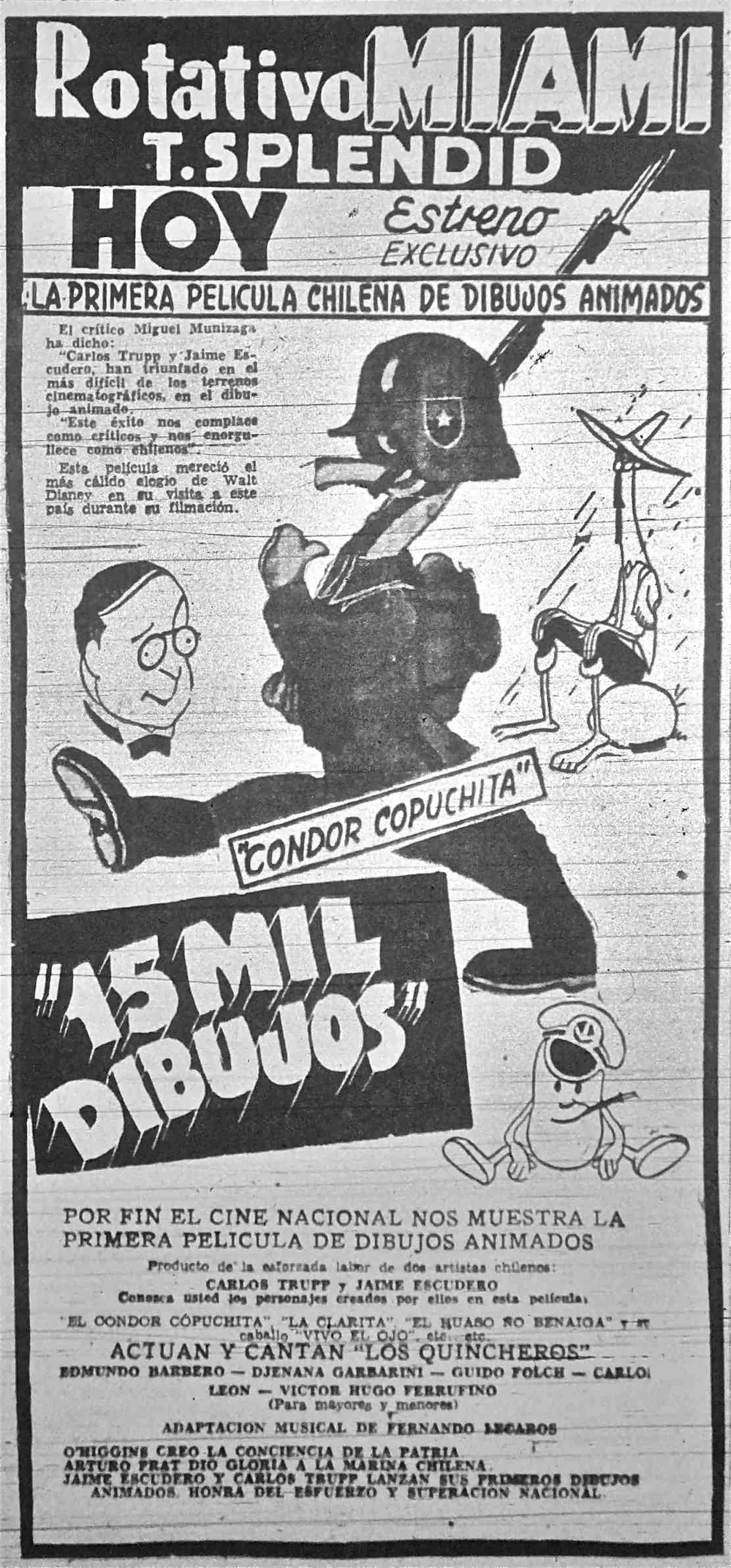
- Advertisement in La Nación; Santiago de Chile, December 24,1942.
- Directed by: Carlos Trupp; Jaime Escudero
- Produced by: Rodolfo Trupp
- Starring: Edmundo Barbero; Djenana Garbarini; Carlos León; Guido Folch; Victor Hugo Ferrufino
- Music by: Leopoldina Malushka
- Animation by: Carlos Trupp; Jaime Escudero; Javier Riesco; Aldo Folch; María Nuño; Alicia von Krugger; Adda von Krugger; Santiago Alegría; Guido Niño de Zepeda; Guido Alessandrini; Fresia Vergara; Arnaldo Cuadra
- Release dates: 19 December 1942 (Teatro Cervantes); 24 December 1942 (Teatro Splendid)
- Running time: 30 minutes (estimate)
- Country: Chile
- Language: Spanish

15 Mil Dibujos (Spanish pronunciation: [ˌkinse ˈmil diˈβuxos], transl. '15 Thousand Drawings') is a 1942 Chilean animated film directed and produced by Carlos Trupp and Jaime Escudero. Despite have been promoted and usually is indicated as the first animated film made in Chile, it was actually the third, after La transmisión del mando supremo (1921), and Vida y milagros de Don Fausto (1924), but it is the first one to not be a silent film.

Currently, only a fragment of approximately one minute and fifty-five seconds of the main animated sequence is preserved, along with five and twenty-nine seconds of live action footage and some production outtakes restored in 2015. Although its exact running time is unknown, the recovered fragments, contemporary press archives, and the documentary Recordando ("Remembering", 1960) indicate that it would have consisted of around 7 to 8 minutes of animated footage and live action segments of an unknown length, which included a presentation by the Chilean musical group 'Los Quincheros', bringing the total length to over half an hour.

== Plot ==
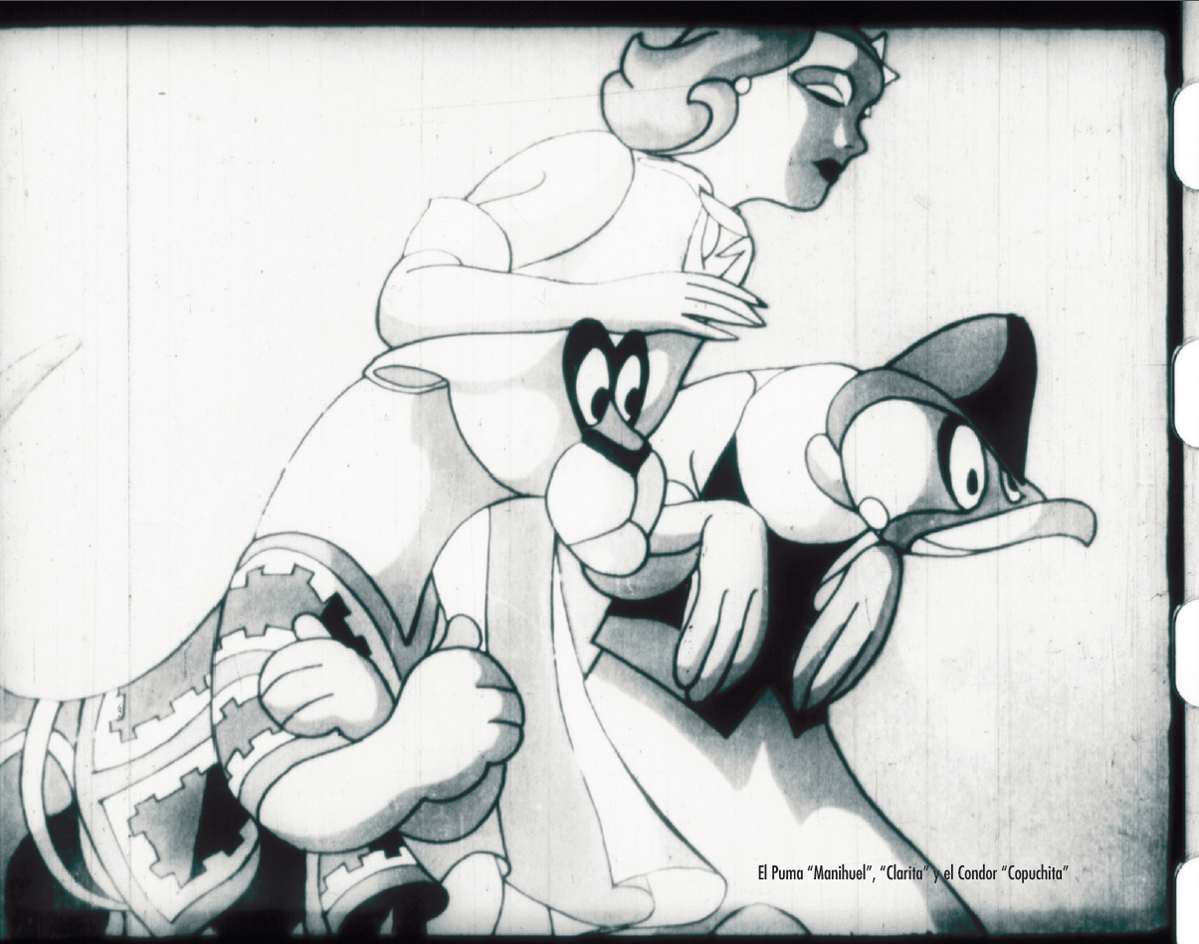
Left to right: Manihuel, Clarita and Copuchita

The exact plot of the film is unknown. However, the animated sequences feature a range of expressive characters within a wild and timeless landscape. Among them, those whose names are still known today are:

- Copuchita an anthropomorphic condor representing the Chilean roto. This is the only animated character for whom any spoken segment has been recorded. His name is a derivation of the word copucha, Chilean slang for gossip.
- Clarita, a slender and elegant young human woman, apparently the "star character". She wears a hair ornament shaped like the five-pointed star of the Chilean flag.
- Manihuel, a Mapuche puma inspired by an uncle of the filmmakers.
- Ño Benaiga, a huaso rooster mounted on a horse named Vivo el Ojo.

Press archives also mention Koskorrón, who is described as an anthropomorphic bean.

A 1941 article from VEA magazine covering the film while it was still under production, provides partial details about how the animated segments played:

The plot focuses in a caravan going through our countryside, meanwhile the music and voices of “Los Quincheros” sing:

“Baja el agüita cantando
por las orillas del río,
trayendo hojitas de peumo,
tan claritos como el día...”

[“Little water flows singing
along the riverbanks,
carrying peumo leaves,

as bright as the day...”]

— Revista VEA, Nº130, Santiago, October 8, 1941.

The musical band "Los Quincheros" (not to be confused with Los Huasos Quincheros) mentioned above, was formed by Edmundo Barbero, Djenana Garbarini, Guido Folch, Carlos León and Victor Hugo Ferrufino. According to contemporary press releases and what can be seen in the recovered footage, they also participated as actors during at least one segment, before performing a song on camera.

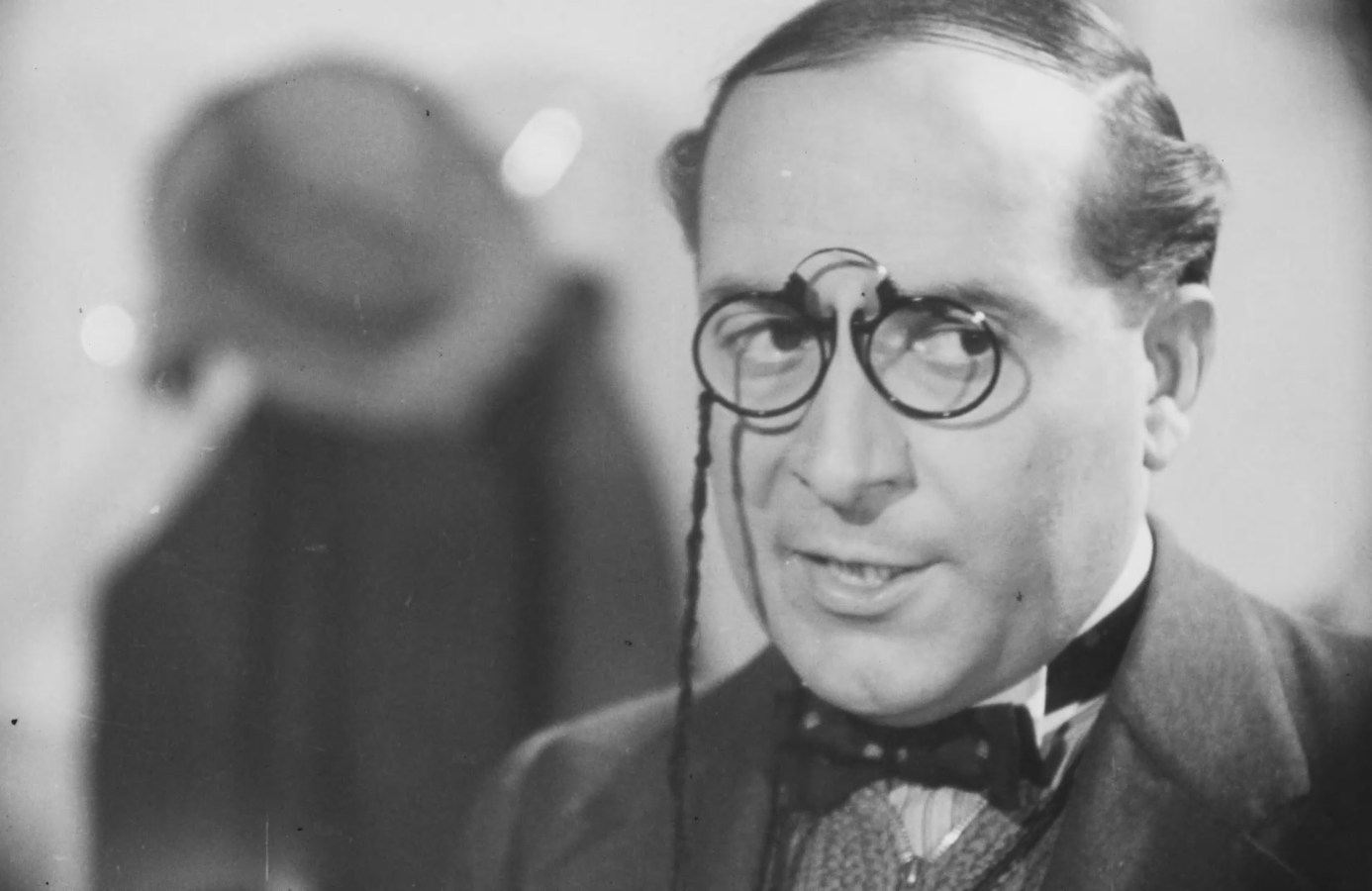
Sotonini, played by Edmundo Barbero

From the restored live-action fragment, it is also possible to partially infer the plot of that sequence. Apparently, it would be a comedic representation of the making of the animated film, with one of the challenges being finding artists to perform the music. This segment features a character named Sotonini (Edmundo Barbero), a famous European-accented, prince-nez glasses wearing musician, who reports he has been unable to find musicians for the film; as result, the animators themselves decide to call a series of friends and acquaintances to help him.

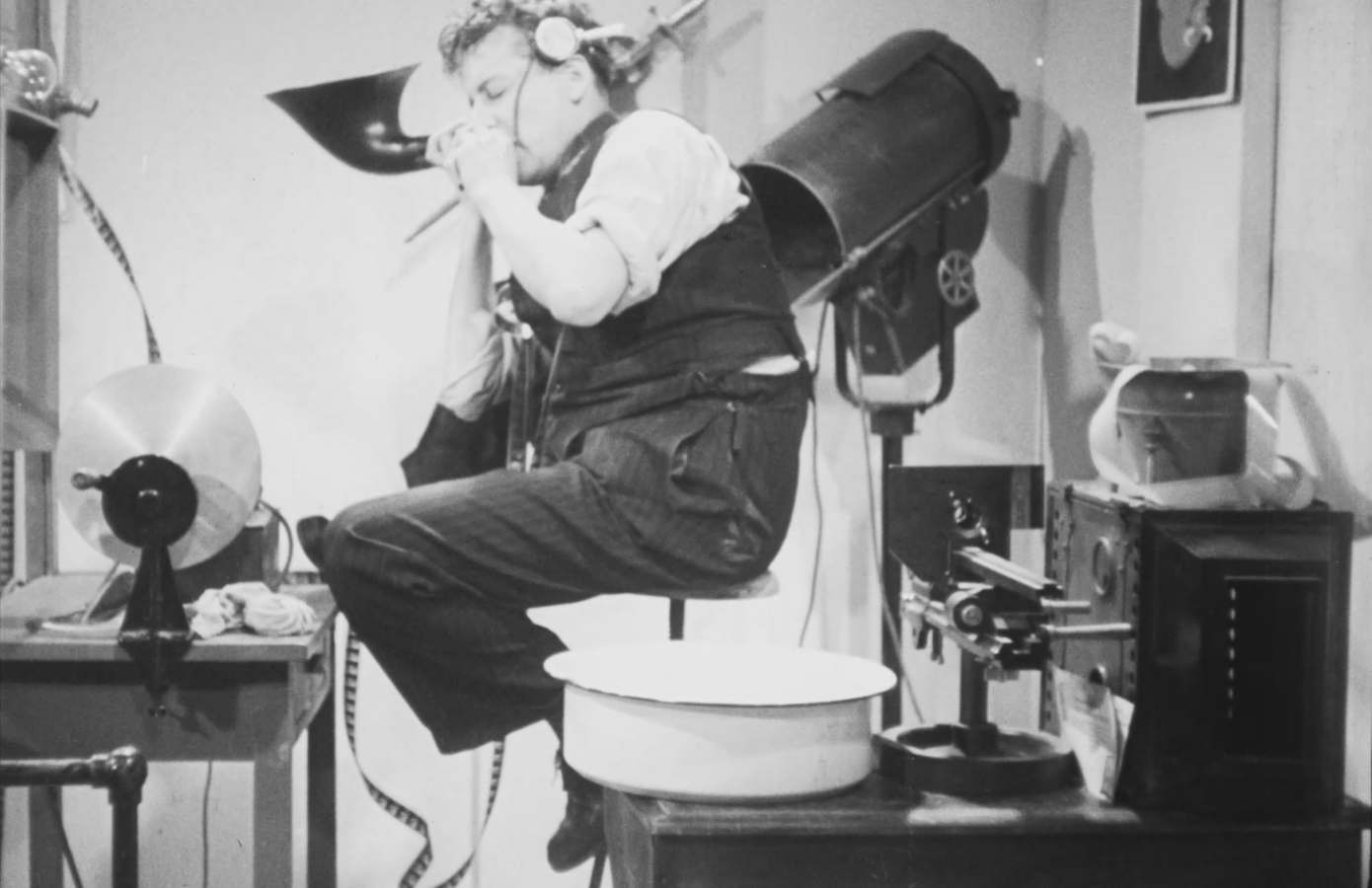
El Capitalista "synchronizing audio"

Another character whose name is mentioned at the same scene, is El Capitalista (The Capitalist); portrayed as the eccentric creator of the animated characters. He's seen performing audio tests and interacting with an animated condor, distinct to Copuchita.

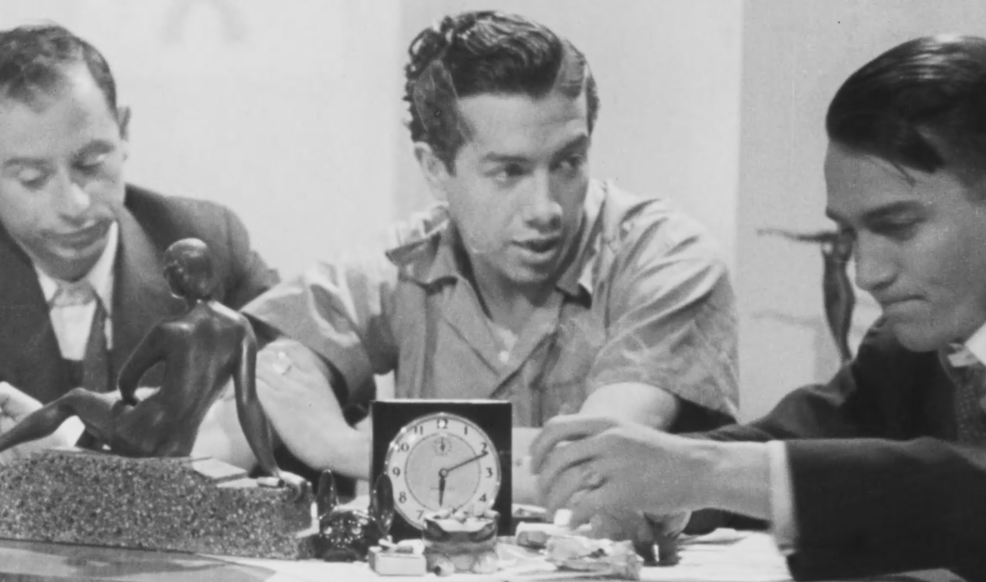
Carlos Trupp talking about the project with his staff co-workers

A number of members of the film's animation staff can be seen working in a scene, including Carlos Trupp, who seems frustrated by the difficulties the project is going through, as well as by the noises caused by El Capitalista.

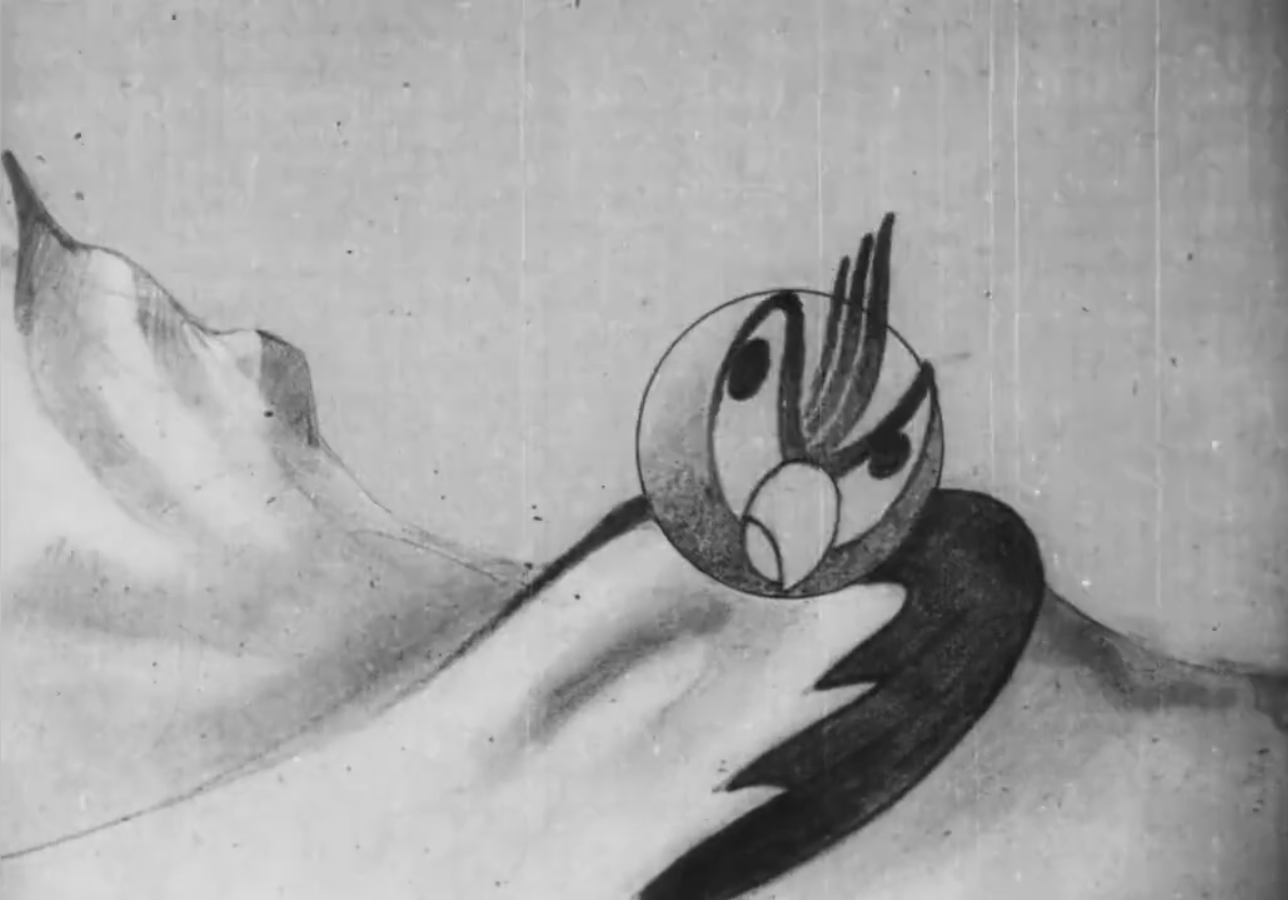
Distinct-to-Copuchita condor which interacts with El Capitalista

In a review by La Nación, the actor and singer Hernán Velasco is also mentioned to have played a role in the film.

According to an interview given by Jaime Escudero to Ergocomics.cl in 2004, the film could partly be considered “propaganda for the nitrate industry”. That allowed the staff to obtain additional resources to complete its production.

== Production ==
The initial idea of producing an animated film came from Carlos Trupp, who at the time was a student at the architecture school of the Pontifical Catholic University of Chile. In 1939, he convinced his fellow student Jaime Escudero to join the project; who agreed after seeing in the project an opportunity to reinvindicate the figure of the Chilean 'roto', distancing it from the negative image portrayed by characters such as Verdejo from Topaze magazine. For this reason, Copuchita was designed as an attempt to symbolize the traits and features of that figure, but without its flaws.

Escudero described Trupp as hyperactive, sociable, and a huge fan of cinema, while he considered himself more introverted and intellectual. Despite their personal differences, they decided to undertake the production of the film. At the start it was mostly funded by the Trupp family, as well as by two loans acquired by the two filmmakers through the recently created CORFO totalling 5,000 pesos (roughly equivalent to US$5,400 at 2026 exchange rates), so they could acquire raw 35mm film stock and inks. Production quickly began in an office located on Lira Street in Santiago, where most of the animated segments would be produced and filmed (although Escudero mentions having worked in several other locations during this period).

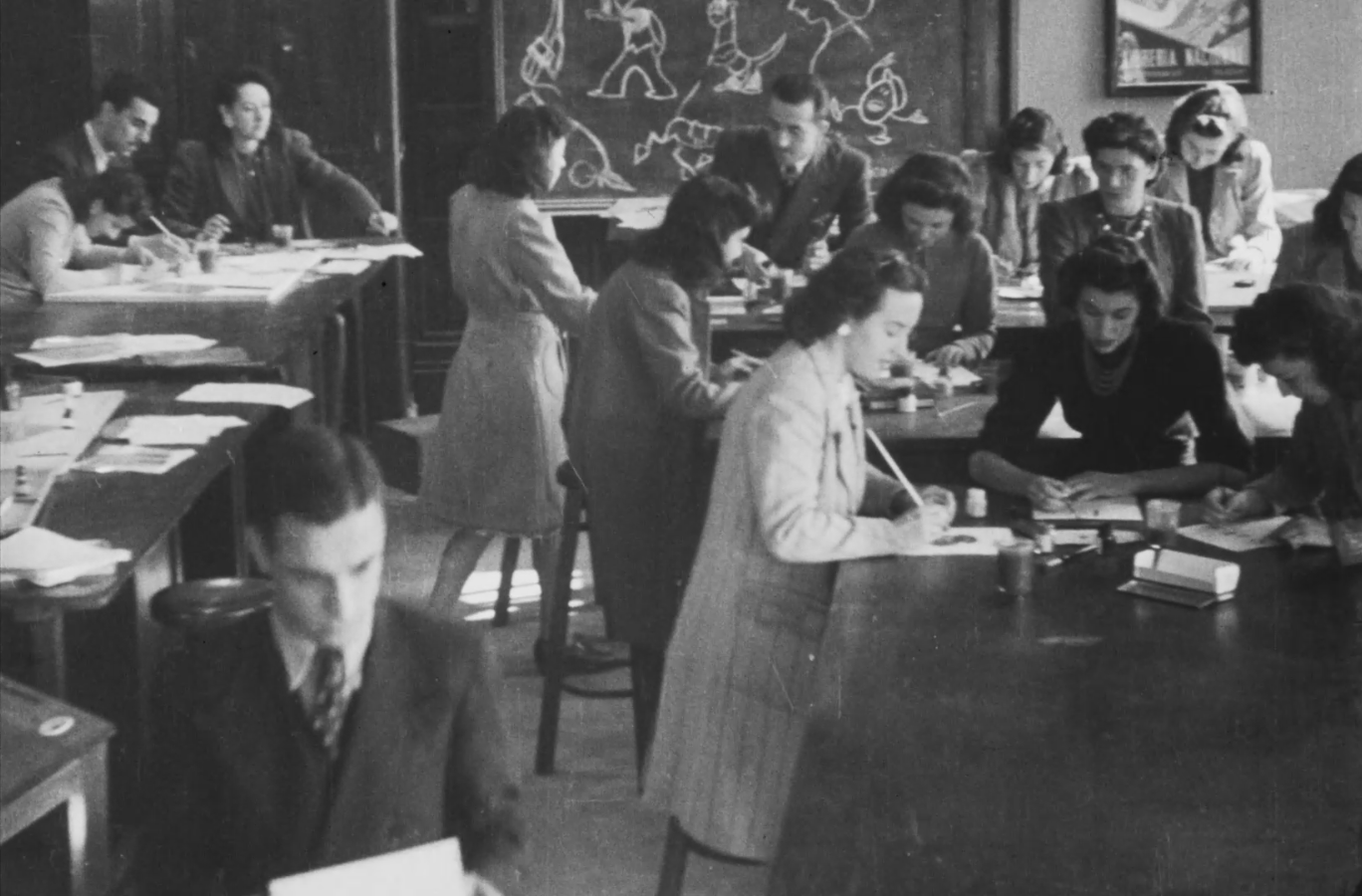
Animators working on the animated short, as seen on the live action segment

Much of the work was carried out by classmates and friends who participated without pay. Among them, it is worth noting that their first camera was provided by René Berthelón, a prominent silent film filmmaker of the time. Later, however, they used a camera built by Rodolfo Trupp, Carlos's uncle, which allowed them to film animation frames in a way similar to the multiplane camera system, despite lacking formal knowledge of the technology developed in other studios. Meanwhile, sound production involved the trio of Eugenio de Liguoro, Ricardo Vivado, and Ewald Beir, known for forming the “VDB” studio, who were involved in the vast majority of films produced in Chile between 1941 and 1945.

The score was composed by Leopoldina Malushka, Carlos Trupp's grandmother; although contemporary ads also credites composer Fernando Lecaros as responsible for adapting one or more of the songs performed by Los Quincheros, presumably in the live-action segment.

Later in production, in 1941, it was decided to add live-action scenes to extend the film's running time. These were filmed in offices provided free of charge by Chilefilms; however, the high cost of the actors ultimately threatened the completion of the film. As a result, they had to seek additional funding from the Compañía de Salitres de Chile (COSACH), arranged through Escudero's father, who worked there as a lawyer.

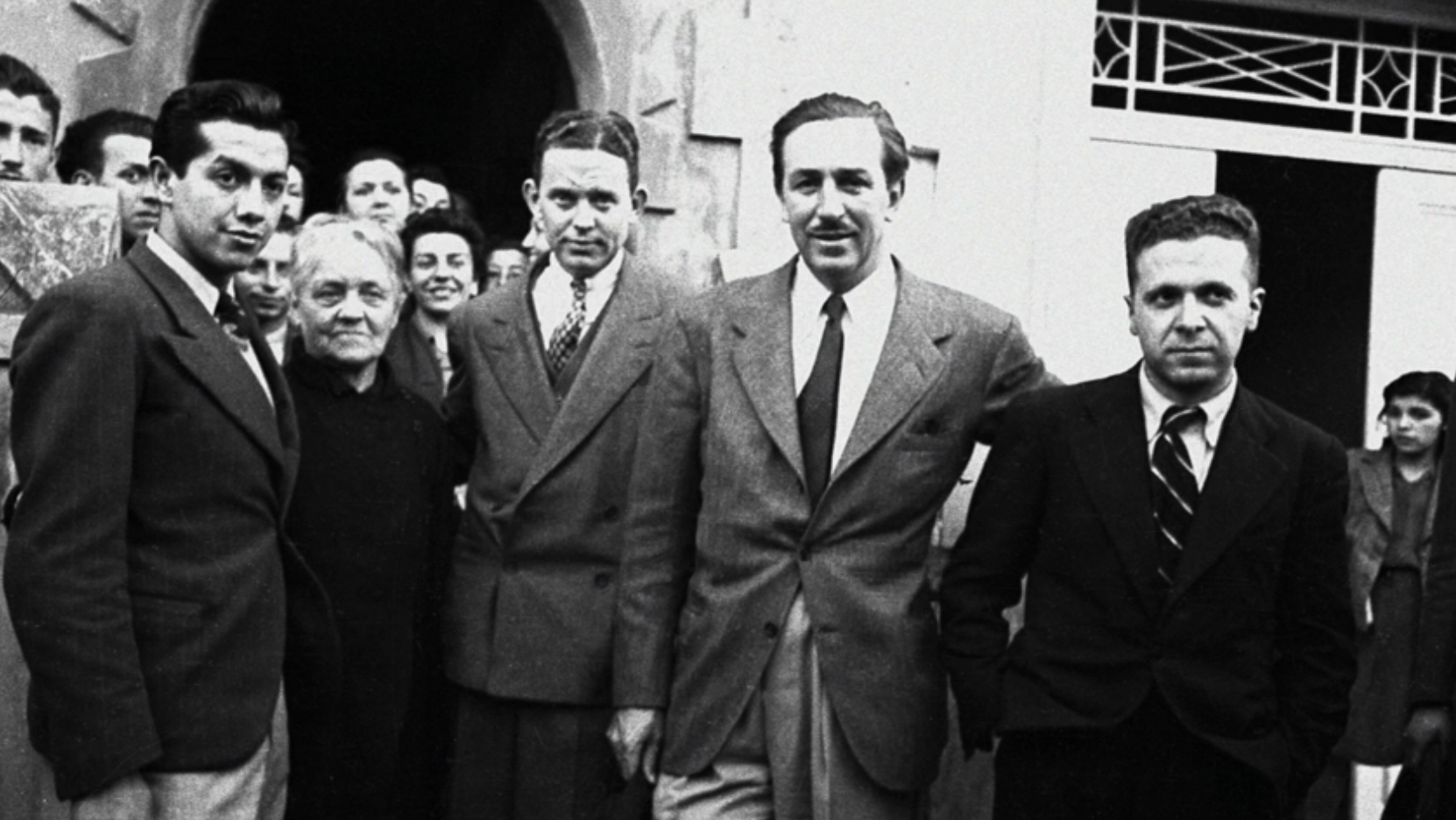
Left to right: Carlos Trupp, Leopoldina Malushka, Norm Ferguson, Walt Disney and Jaime Escudero.

=== Walt Disney's visit ===
In 1941, during Walt Disney’s “goodwill trip” to South America, Disney visited Escudero and Trupp's studio in Santiago. Disney was able to watch the first reels of the film and praised both the handcrafted animation technique and the integration of music with the drawings. He also offered practical advice to speed up production, which until then had been stalled due to the team's lack of experience, limited resources, and Escudero's excessive perfectionism.

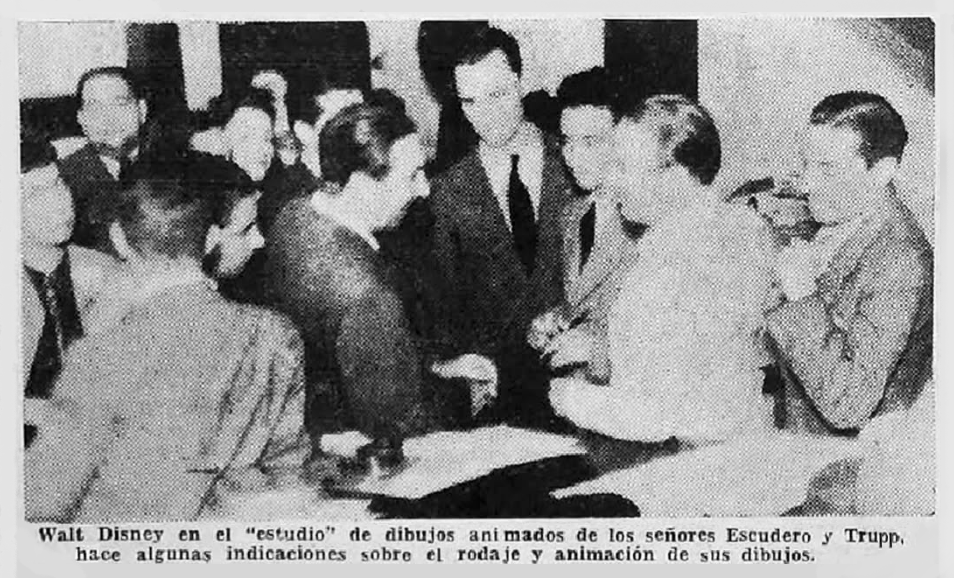
Walt Disney visiting the studio alongside the Chilean filmmakers.

Impressed by their efforts, Disney offered them the opportunity to work at his studio; an invitation that unfortunately wasn't meant to be, due to the outbreak of World War II, which caused international flights to be more dangerous, and made the necessary arrangements more complicated (it was reported that the details of the trip and their eventual stay in the country would be coordinated by the United States government itself).

It has also been speculated that, even if this opportunity had come to fruition, both Trupp and Escudero, being Chilean and relatively inexperienced, would likely not have had a place in the studio's shift toward producing wartime propaganda films during that period.

Although contemporary press articles reported the invitation was to Escudero only; statements from both Trupp's family and Escudero himself, clarify it was for both of them.

== Premiere and release ==
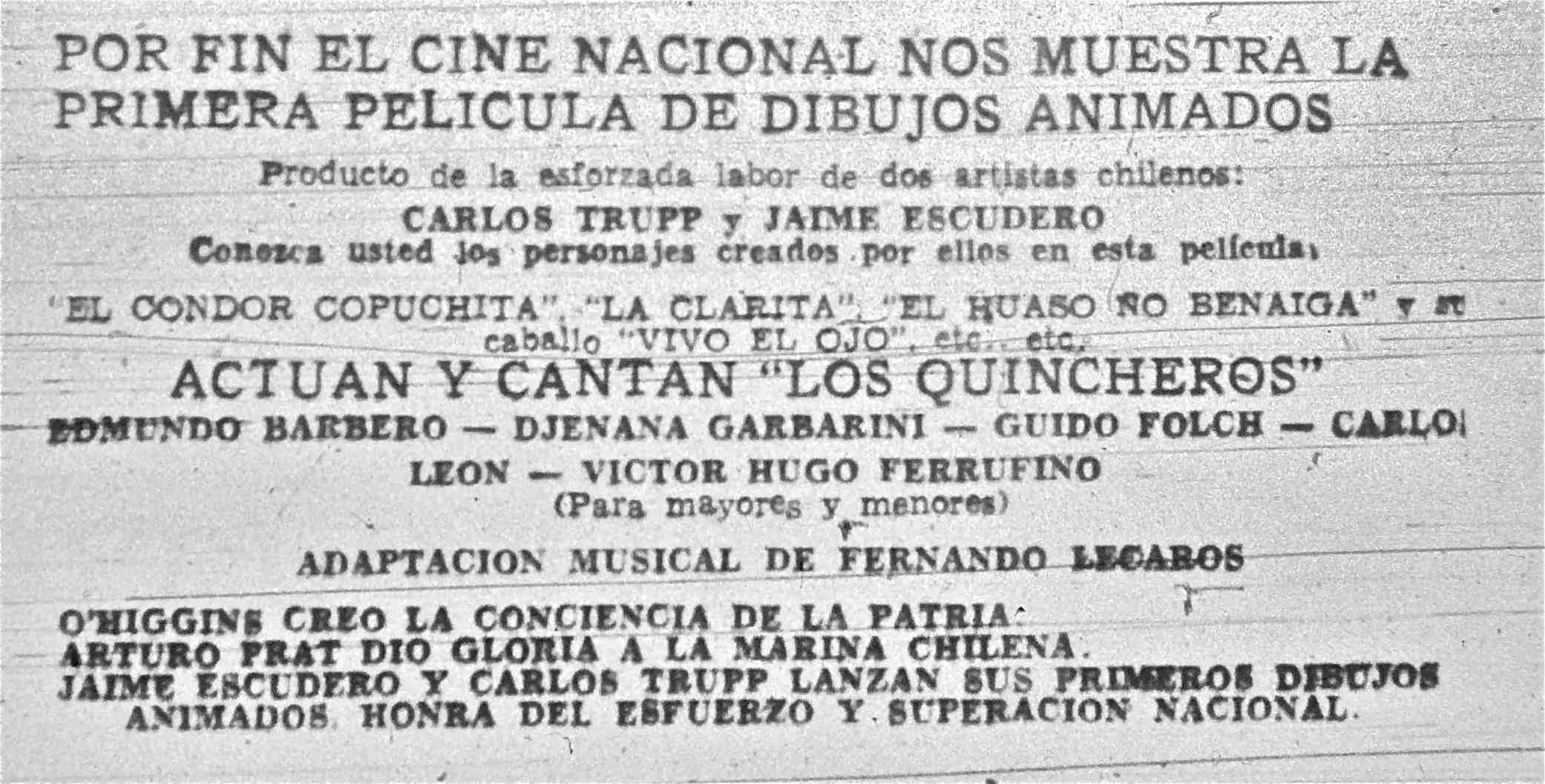
Ad in La Nacion's issue on the premiere day

The film was first shown at a private screening for the press on December 19,1942 at the Cervantes theatre. It was later premiered to the public on December 24 of the same year, at the “Miami” room of the Splendid film theatre, on continuous screenings until December 30.

On its final screening day, a “Grand Tribute” event was held in the same theater in honor of the filmmakers, featuring Olguita Núñez (Miss Radio 1943), the renowned actors Ester Soré and Raúl Videla, and the Argentine actress Alicia Decurgez.

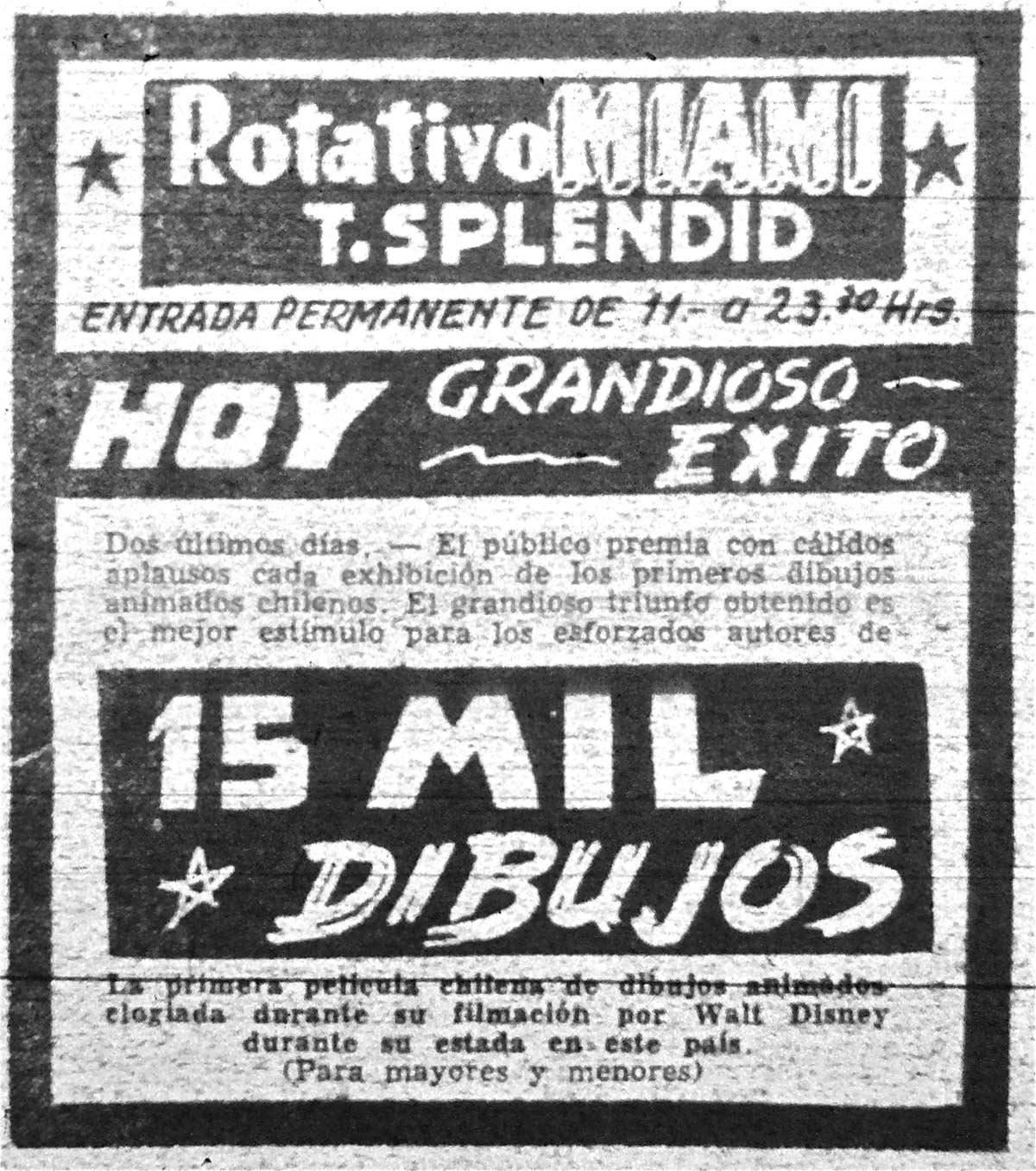
Ad in La Nación, December 29

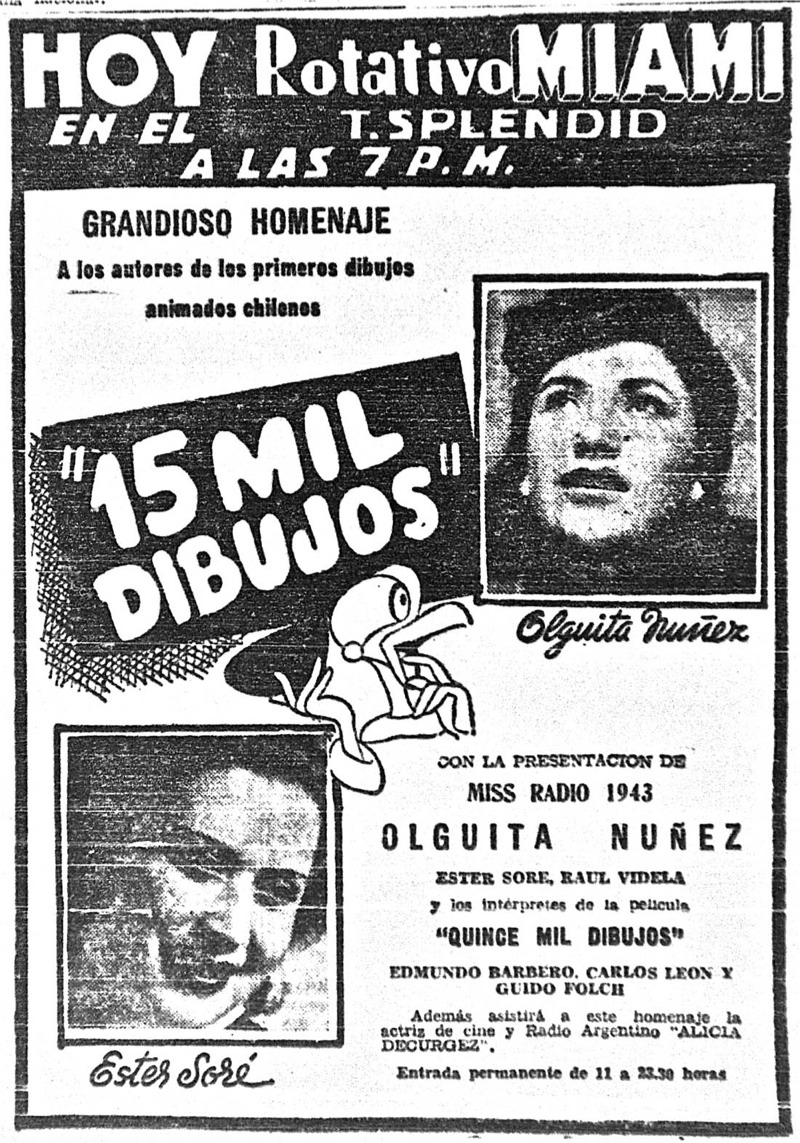
Ad in La Nación announcing the closing "Grand Tribute"

== Reception ==
=== Crítical response ===
The film got mixed reviews. While some critics praised the effort and technical innovation of the project, others also questioned the coherence of the plot and the quality of the drawings.

After the first private screening, VEA magazine, although stating that “the work of Escudero and Trupp deserves applause because it demonstrates the possibilities that exist in Chile for making animated films” and praising the participation of Los Quincheros, was harsh regarding the animated sequence, calling the plot “grotesque” and stating that “the drawings lack solidity and harmony in their movements.”

Santiago del Campo, from Ercilla, adopted a more condescending and optimistic tone, noting that “it would be absurd to expect the same technical maturity, fully developed execution or the rhythm which the cartoons Disney and Fleischer give us” describing the production as “a pleasant surprise.” He added that “as for the movement of the cartoon characters, there is a spark of local mischievousness suggested in their gliding and gestures, a precise sense of humor, a peculiar charm that emerges in every sketched line.”

A similar attitude was shown by Miguel Munizaga of the newspaper La Nación, who pointed out that the film “presents a series of images that are highly charming and typically local,” praising the work of Carlos Trupp as director, whom he stated “could direct feature-length films more effectively than many other directors in our field.”

On the other hand, Ecran magazine gave a more mixed to negative review. It invited audiences to “view this first attempt made in our country with benevolent eyes”, and suggested that “when watching this film one must set aside strict cinematic standards,” but then declared it “contains an endless amount of flaws,” and that “the plot is almost childish,” and “too slow and tiring,” concluding “it's an archival film that will not appeal to the public,” and that it “should be kept as a memento. Nothing else.”

In its year-end review, Ercilla once again mentioned the film, stating that “this film is valuable not for what it currently is, but for the possibilities it holds for the future.”

=== Audience reception and aftermath ===
Although no box office information is available, the film was simply unable to compete with other productions of the time, such as Bambi, which was still being screened during the same period, and even in the same theater, and it also paled in comparison to earlier films like Snow White and the Seven Dwarfs and Pinocchio. As a result, the filmmakers considered it a complete commercial failure.

Since their expectations were not met, Trupp and Escudero were left in debt. This, combined with resulting legal issues from the aforementioned debts and by getting in agreements with Cine Imperio while simultaneously working with Teatro Splendid; their families’ finances ended up getting affected, so they lost any support from them to continue in this venture. Because of this, both filmmakers abandoned animation entirely; although five years later Carlos Trupp would direct the film Santiago de cuatro siglos (Santiago of Four Centuries), a documentary work which contained no animation. Years later, Escudero would state that he did not consider the film to be particularly important in his life.

As for the film footage, due to the legal issues, Trupp decided to store it in separate parts, remaining forgotten for years until it was briefly mentioned in the documentary Recordando, where some scenes were shown. Later, in a 1962 article in Ecran regarding the production of the film Condorito en el Circo (Condorito in the Circus, which was never released), the character Copuchita was briefly mentioned, describing it as a possible “father of Condorito.”

== Restoration efforts and Legacy ==
In 2012, Kylie Trupp, granddaughter of Carlos Trupp, attended an exam at University of the Americas (UDLA) in Santiago with the intention of studying animation. When one of her teachers recognized her surname, she was quickly put in contact with Patricio Escala, producer at Punkrobot, who possessed some animation fragments from 15 Mil Dibujos that had been recovered from the Recordando documentary. These were burned onto a CD and later uploaded by her to YouTube channel.

Later that same year, she was informed about the additional fragments that were in possession of her father, Rodrigo Trupp, who was living in the United States. Prior to this, Rodrigo had unsuccessfully attempted to recover and restore the material in 2001, but failed due to the technical and logistical limitations of the time.

With the support of the Trupp family, Sergio Díaz (director of the Animation program at the UDLA, and the Cineteca Nacional de Chile, these materials were restored and digitized, allowing previously unseen images to be recovered for historical preservation. Part of the material is now available online through the Cineteca Nacional's website and on the YouTube channel Carlos Trupp Archivo, created by Kylie Trupp and dedicated to archiving the animator's work and the film.

In the following years, this initiative sparked renewed interest in the film and highlighted its importance in the history of Chilean animation. In 2013, Universidad de las Américas paid tribute to Carlos Trupp during the Noche de Monos festival, recognizing his pioneering contribution. Later, in 2017, the Chilemonos festival included 15 Mil Dibujos in the exhibition Del Cóndor al Oso (From the Condor to the Bear), which celebrated the historical development of national animation up to that point, alongside the short film Bear Story, winner of Chile's first Academy Award for animation.

On that occasion, Kylie Trupp also received recognition for her work in recovering the material.

In 2026, the website Carlos Trupp Archive was created with the goal of gathering and sharing all available material from the film and the rest of Carlos Trupp's known work with the public, as well as managing how the content is used. On April of the same year, and through efforts of the Chilean Cineteca Nacional, 5 additional minutes of the restored footage were made available to the public.
