= El mago de los sueños =

- Theatrical release poster
- Directed by: Francisco Macián
- Written by: Francisco Macián; Alicia Soriano; Ibrahim Kurtić
- Produced by: Carlos Amador
- Starring: Andy Russell; Juan Carlos Mareco; Chicho Gordillo; Tito Mora; Ennio Sangiusto; Teresa María
- Music by: José Solá
- Production companies: Estudios Macián; Studijo Kurtić
- Distributed by: Izaro Films
- Release date: December 16, 1966 (Spain)
- Running time: 72 minutes
- Country: Spain
- Language: Spanish

El Mago de los sueños (The Dream Wizard) is a 1966 Spanish animated musical adventure fantasy comedy film directed by Francisco Macián and produced by Carlos Amador.

== Story ==
The film features the six children of the Telerin family (Cleo, Cuquin, Maripi, Pelusin, Tete and Colitas), characters created by the brothers José Luis Moro and Santiago Moro. The Wizard gives each child a dream; the six dreams are presented in different graphical styles.
