= Kandor Graphics =

Studio based in Granada, Spain

- Type: Animation studio
- Industry: Animation
- Genre: Family films Computer animation
- Founded: 1992
- Founder: Manuel Sicilia; Raul Garcia
- Headquarters: Granada, Spain

Kandor Graphics is a Spanish 3D computer animation feature and short film studio in Granada, Spain, established in 1992. The studio produced feature films The Missing Lynx and Justin and the Knights of Valour, and short films The Tell-Tale Heart and The Lady and the Reaper.

== Feature films ==
Film	Year	Director(s)	Writer(s)	Budget	Domestic Gross	Worldwide Gross	Running time(s)
The Missing Lynx	2008	Manuel Sicilia and Raul Garcia	Manuel Sicilia, Raul Garcia and Jose E. Machuca	[$6,500,000	$1,445,936	$3,114,665	100 minutes
Justin and the Knights of Valour	2013	Manuel Sicilia	Manuel Sicilia and Matthew Jacobs	$30,500,000	$3,257,473	$19,421,262	96 minutes

== Short films ==
- The Tell-Tale Heart (Animated Short, 2005).
- The Lady and the Reaper (Animated Short, 2009). Nominated in the 82nd Academy Awards for Best Animated Short
