= Gisaku =

- Theatrical poster
- Directed by: Baltasar Pedrosa Clavero; Antonio Santamaría
- Produced by: Julio Fernández
- Music by: Óscar Araujo
- Distributed by: Filmax
- Release dates: 4 March 2005 (Japan); 17 March 2006 (Spain)
- Running time: 78 minutes
- Country: Spain
- Languages: Japanese; Spanish; English

Gisaku is a Spanish animated feature film directed by Baltasar Pedrosa Clavero. It was premiered in Japan on March 4, 2005. It was theatrically released in Spain on March 17, 2006. The film has three official soundtracks: Japanese, Spanish, and English.

== Plot ==
The film relates the adventures of a young Japanese samurai named Yohei who visited Spain in the 17th century, in a story loosely taking its inspiration from the travels of historic samurai Hasekura. Yohei survived in hiding to the present day due to magical powers ("After centuries of lethargy, he awakes in a World he does not know"), and accomplishes many adventures in modern Spain as a superhero.

=== Characters ===
- Gisaku is the demonical pet (of Gorkan) who lost its power after swallowing the piece of Heart; now an adorable metal-eating baby lion.
- Riki is a young Spanish boy, who lost his parents in a car accident.
- Yohei is a brave samurai from the past the last surviving of the guardian that defeated Gorkan 400 years ago, who awakened after centuries of sleep to stop Gorkan again.
- Moira is an individualistic girl, whose interests lie in both high-tech and protection of the environment, she is a genius-level inventor
- Linceto is a mutated Spanish lynx who can speak and walk like a person. He blames the human race for the extinction of his species.
- Gorkan is the only demon who survived the battle between men and the forces of evil 400 years ago, and now plans to dominate the world.

== See also ==
- Hasekura Tsunenaga
- List of animated feature films
- List of Spanish films of 2006
