= Arturo Moreno (cartoonist) =

Spanish comics artist (1909–1993)

- Born: 10 May 1909 Valencia, Spain
- Died: 25 June 1993 (aged 84) Barcelona, Spain
- Notable works: Garbancito de la Mancha

Signature
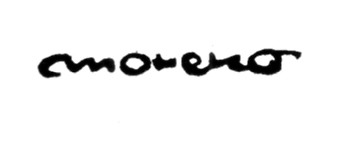

Arturo Moreno (10 May 1909 – 25 June 1993) was a Spanish cartoonist, comics artist and animator.

His family moved to Barcelona when he was eight. Moreno began working as a professional artist in the 1920s, contributing to a satirical magazine, Pulgarcito.

In 1942, Moreno founded Diarmo Films with José María Arola. "Diarmo" is a portmanteau of "Dibujos animados Arola y Moreno" (Spanish for "Arola and Moreno Animations").

In 1948, he emigrated to Caracas, Venezuela and worked for the Venezuelan Ministry of Education on Tricolor, an educational children's magazine, as well as advertising spots. Moreno returned to Spain in 1956.

He was known as one of the most prominent Spanish animators.

== Biography ==
After moving to Barcelona, Moreno began taking drawing classes. After working as a comic strip artist, he began drawing for Pulgarcito and another magazine, TBO, in 1924. In 1929, he had his first exhibition. At this point, he began to take an interested in animation, after seeing movies featuring Felix the Cat. His debut was a one-minute black-and-white commercial for a chocolate company.

== Works ==
Year	Title	Publisher	Notes
1926	Tommy, aventuras de un joven sportman	Pulgarcito
1930	Formidables trapisondas del Grumete Mick, el viejo Mock y el Perro Muck	Pocholo	Dos entregas
1934	Aventuras de un faraón en el Siglo XX	Ki-Ki-Ri-Ki
1935	Punto negro	Pocholo
1936	Punto negro en el País del Juego	Pocholo	Álbum monográfico
1936	Faustino de la O	Mickey
1936	Freddy, el pequeño botones	Pocholo
194-	Selección de historietas judías	Bauzá	Álbum monográfico
1941	Cupatintas y su pandilla	Chicos	Primera época de la revista.
1941	Capuchín	Mis Chicas
1942	El Califa cigüeña	Mis Chicas
1943	El Flautista de Homelín	Chicos
1945	Cuentos de Mateo y Lepi	Flechas y Pelayos
1949	Moreno	Buigas	número 6
1956	León y Arpón, trotamuntos	Paseo Infantil
1957	Aventuras de Cuqui	Maravillas
1957	Pinky Trotamundos	Pinocho
1957	Ciclonín	Pinocho
1957	Fifilo	Paseo Infantil
1958	Jacin Too	Bailarín
1970	Humor Gráfico español del siglo XX		número 46
1974	Chito	Chito
1991	La familia de Ulises	Los Archivos del TBO	número 6
1998	Cien cómics sobre aspirina		Obra póstuma.

=== Cine ===
Title	Year	Length	Budget	Box office	Profits
La risa va por barrios (y/o El capitán Tormentoso)	1942	14 minutes	s.d.	s.d.	s.d.
Garbancito de la Mancha	1945	85 minutes	3 809 618 pesetas	s.d.	between 2 000 000 and 3 000 000 pesetas
Alegres vacaciones	1948	73 minutes	3 000 000 pesetas	s.d.	s.d. (Note: Aunque no se tienen datos de los beneficios que obtuvo la película, Arturo Moreno afirmó que sí se obtuvieron debido a que la productora realizó una tercera película, Los sueños de Tay-Pi.)

== Bibliography ==
- José María Candel Crespo (1993). Ediciones Tres Fronteras (ed.). Historia del dibujo animado español (in Spanish). Editora Regional de Murcia. ISBN 978-0-7864-3365-0.
- Cuadrado, Jesús (2000). Atlas español de la cultura popular: De la historieta y su uso 1873-2000 (in Spanish). Madrid: Ediciones Sinsentido/Fundación Germán Sánchez Ruipérez. ISBN 84-89384-23-1.
