= Jesús Manuel Montané =

Spanish film director

- Born: 22 September 1972 (age 54); Barcelona, Spain
- Occupations: Film director, film producer, writer, journalist
- Years active: 1990–present
- Notable work: 2.0, Godspeed: One: Secret Legacy, Ushima-Next

Jesús Manuel Montané Juvillà (Barcelona, 1972) is a film director, writer and journalist. He has done music videos (Begging The Waves, for Lídia Pujol), animated movies such as 2.0 (1998) and Godspeed: One: Secret Legacy (2008), and the live-action feature-length movie Ushima-Next (2011), featuring author Fernando Arrabal. It premiered at the Noves Visions section of the Festival Internacional de Cine Fantástico de Sitges. Montané is a member of the Colegio Profesional del Audiovisual de Catalunya (CPAC), and a founding member of the production company Grupo Estudio.
