= Garbancito de la Mancha =

- Theatrical release poster
- Directed by: José María Blay; Arturo Moreno
- Written by: E. Piera, M. Amat, and Julián Pemartín
- Produced by: José María Blay
- Music by: Jacinto Guerrero; Joaquín Bisbe
- Production company: Balet y Blay
- Release dates: 23 November 1945 (Madrid); 13 May 1946 (Valencia)
- Running time: 98 min
- Country: Spain
- Language: Spanish

Garbancito de la Mancha is a Spanish animated film directed by José María Blay and Arturo Moreno. Released in 1945, it is the first animated feature film produced in Spain, the first cel-animated feature film produced in Europe, and the first animated feature film produced in color outside of the United States. It is inspired by the story of Don Quijote.

The film was considered lost until 2020, when several of the original reels were recovered.

== Synopsis ==
Garbancito is an orphan whose friends, Kiriqui and Chirili, are kidnapped by the giant Caramanca. To rescue his friends, Garbancito is assisted by a goat named Peregrina, his Fairy Godmother, and an enchanted sword.

== Recovery ==
The original film had been considered lost, with a single film cell in a museum.

In 2019 and 2020, 8 of the 10 original dufay reels were discovered at two separate yard sales by collector David Bull, who contacted Spain and returned the reels to them at the small sum of €5,200, which just recovered what he had invested in storage and research. Asked why he didn't try to sell the priceless reels for a large sum Bull replied "I could not hold a country's cultural heritage hostage".

== See also ==
- Garbancito, the folktale
