= Alegres vacaciones =

- Theatrical release poster
- Directed by: José María Blay (as J.Mª Blay), Arturo Moreno
- Production company: Balet y Blay
- Distributed by: Tusisa
- Release dates: December 27, 1948 (Spain (Barcelona and Madrid))
- Running time: 73 minutes
- Country: Spain
- Budget: Three million pesetas

Alegres vacaciones (English: Happy Holidays) is a 1948 Spanish animated film by Arturo Moreno.
