= Quirino Awards =

Ibero-American annual animation award ceremony

- Awarded for: Excellence in Ibero-American animation achievements.
- Country: Ibero-America
- First award: 7 April 2018; 8 years ago
- Website: premiosquirino.org/en/

The Quirino Awards, known in Spanish as Premios Quirino de la Animación Iberoamericana ("Quinino Awards for Ibero-American animation") are an annual awards ceremony dedicated to reward achievements in Ibero-American animated productions. Its categories recognize feature films, short films and television productions.

The awards were established in 2017, with the first awards ceremony taking place on 7 April 2018 in Santa Cruz de Tenerife, Spain. Since then, the ceremony has usually taken place in May of each year during several days in some location within Tenerife. The awards' name is in honour of Italian-Argentinian animation director Quirino Cristiani, known for being responsible of the 1917 film El Apóstol, considered the world's first animated feature film.

== Categories ==
- Best Ibero-American Feature Film
- Best Ibero-American Series
- Best Ibero-American Short Film
- Best Ibero-American School Short Film
- Best Commissioned Film
- Best Visual Development
- Best Animation Design
- Best Sound Design and Original Music
- Best Video Game Animation (2020–present)
- Best Innovative Work (2018–2019)

== Ceremonies ==
The following is a listing of all Quirino Awards ceremonies since 2018.

Ceremony	Date	Best Feature Film winner	Venue	Ref.
1st (2018)	7 April 2018	Ana y Bruno (Mexico)	Santa Cruz de Tenerife, Spain	
2nd (2019)	6 April 2019	Virus Tropical (Colombia)	Santa Cruz de Tenerife, Spain	
3rd (2020)	27 May 2020	Klaus (Spain)	Virtual	
4th (2021)	29 May 2021	A Costume for Nicholas (Mexico)	La Laguna Gran Hotel, San Cristóbal de La Laguna, Spain	
5th (2022)	12–14 May 2022	Bob Cuspe – Nós Não Gostamos de Gente (Brazil)	La Laguna Gran Hotel, San Cristóbal de La Laguna, Spain	
6th (2023)	11–13 May 2023	Nayola (Portugal)	La Laguna Gran Hotel, San Cristóbal de La Laguna, Spain	
7th (2024)	11 May 2024	Robot Dreams (Spain)	La Laguna Gran Hotel, San Cristóbal de La Laguna, Spain	

== Winners and nominees ==
The winners are listed first and in bold, followed by the nominees.

=== 2018 ===
**Best Ibero-American Feature Film**: **Ana y Bruno – Carlos Carrera, director; Pablo Baksht, Alex García, Mónica Lozano, Fernando De Fuentes, José C. García de Letona, producers (Mexico)**; Deep – Julio Soto, director; Ibon Cormenzana, Ángel Durández, Nadia Khamliche, Gerd Schepers, Gero Bauknecht, producers (Spain); Lila's Book – Marcela Rincón, director; Maritza Rincón, Marcela Rincón, Alfredo Soderguit, Jhonny Hendrix, producers (Colombia, Uruguay); Tad, The Lost Explorer – Enrique Gato, David Alonso, directors; Jordi Gasull, Ghislain Barrois, Nico Matji, producers (Spain)	**Best Ibero-American Series**: **El Hombre Más Chiquito del Mundo – Juan Pablo Zaramella, director; Camille Raulo, Sol Rulloni, producers (Argentina, Francia)**; Cuentos de Viejos – Marcelo Dematei, Carlos Smith, directors; Carlos Smith, Laura Piaggio, producers (Colombia, Spain); Pocoyo – Alex Hidalgo, director; Susana Paniagua, producer (Spain); Paper Port – Alvaro Ceppi, Hugo Covarrubias, directors; Alvaro Ceppi, Gabriel Noé, producers (Argentina, Brazil, Chile, Colombia)
**Best Ibero-American Short Film**: **Decorado – Alberto Vázquez, director; Iván Miñambres, Nicolas Schmerkin, producers (Spain, Francia)**; Afterwork – Luis Uson, Andres Aguilar, directors and producers (Ecuador, Spain, Peru); Cerulia – Sofía Carrillo, director; Paola Chaurand, producer (Mexico)	**Best Ibero-American School Short Film**: **Tántalo (University of Buenos Aires) – Juan Facundo Ayerbe, Christian Krieghoff, directors and producers (Argentina)**; Un día en el parque (Escuela Universitaria de Diseño, Innovación y Tecnología) – Diego Porral, director and producer (Spain, United States); We Are the Immigrants (University of Southern California) – Catalina Matamoros, director and producer (Colombia, United States)
**Best Commissioned Film**: **Cantar con Sentido: Una Biografía de Violeta Parra – Leonardo Beltrán, director; Pablo Greene, producer (Chile)**; Morte e Vida Uterina – Daniel Bruson, director; Samantha Alves, producer (Brazil); Solar City: How Energy Gets to You – Mariano Bergara, Becho Lo Bianco, directors; Sol Bizzozero, producer (Argentina)	**Best Innovative Work**: **The Many Pieces of Mr Coo – Nacho Rodríguez, director and producer (Spain)**; Arqueoastronomía Maya: Observadores del Universo – Milagros Varguez, director; Jesús Pérez Irigoyen, producer (Mexico); Black Canvas – Albert Sherman, director and producer (Spain)
**Best Visual Development**: **Here's the Plan – Fernanda Frick (Chile)**; Lila's Book – Tatiana Espitia, Daniel Murillo (Colombia, Uruguay); Los aeronautas – Rita Basulto (Mexico)	**Best Animation Design**: **Caminho dos Gigantes – Tiago Rovida, Henrique Lobato (Brazil)**; Cerulia – Sofía Carrillo (Mexico); Tad, The Lost Explorer – Maxi Díaz (Spain)
**Best Sound Design and Original Music**: **Tad, The Lost Explorer – Oriol Tarragó, sound; Zacarías M. de la Riva, music (Spain)**; Caminho dos Gigantes – Daniel Turini, Fernando Henna, sound; Tito La Rosa, music (Brazil); The Neverending Wall – Xavier Ferreiro, sound; Nani García, music (Spain)

=== 2019 ===
**Best Ibero-American Feature Film**: **Virus Tropical – Santiago Caicedo, director (Colombia)**; Another Day of Life – Raúl de la Fuente, Damian Nenow, directors; Jaroslaw Sawko, Amaia Remírez, producers (Germany, Belgium, Spain, Poland); Buñuel in the Labyrinth of the Turtles – Salvador Simó, director; Manuel Cristóbal, José María Fernández de la Vega, producers (Spain, Netherlands); Tito and the Birds – Gustavo Steinberg, Gabriel Bitar, André Catoto, directors (Brazil)	**Best Ibero-American Series**: **Jorel's Brother: "Seja Brócolis!" – Juliano Enrico, director; Zé Brandão, producer (Brazil)**; Petit – Bernardita Ojeda Salas, director; Daniela Ponce Miranda, producer (Argentina, Chile, Colombia); Paper Port: "La vida de los otros" – Alvaro Ceppi, director; Gabriel Noé, producer (Argentina, Brazil, Chile, Colombia)
**Best Ibero-American Short Film**: **Guaxuma – Nara Normande, director; Livia de Melo, Damien Megherbi, Justin Pechberty, producers (Brazil, France)**; La Noria – Carlos Baena, director; Sasha Korellis, producer (Spain); Soy una Tumba – Khris Cembe, director; Iván Miñambres, Nicolas Schmerkin, producers (Spain, France)	**Best Ibero-American School Short Film**: **Patchwork (Technical University of Valencia) – María Manero Muro, director (Spain)**; O Chapéu (Polytechnic Institute of Cávado and Ave) – Alexandra Allen, director (Portugal); Reverie (The Animation Workshop – VIA University College) – Philip Piaget, director; Michelle Nardone, Anja Perl, producers (Denmark, Mexico)
**Best Commissioned Film**: **La Increíble Historia del Hombre Que Podía Volar and No Sabía Cómo – Manuel Rubio, director and producer (Spain)**; A Queda – Paulo Garcia, director; Natalia Gouvea, producer (Brazil); Lorenzo Live 2018 Intro – Manuele Fior, director; Martín Martínez, Javier Sánchez, Josep Baño, Alberto Gil, directors and producers (Spain, Italia); Partir de Cero – Carlos Salgado, director; Jaime De Los Santos, Lucía Olano, producers (Spain)	**Best Innovative Work**: **Belisario: El Pequeño Gran Héroe del Cosmos – Hernán Moyano, director; Pablo Santamaria, producer (Argentina)**; Bring You Home – Marc Terris, Xavi Terris, directors and producers (Spain); Mibots Playroom – Nathalie Martinez, director and producer (Spain)
**Best Visual Development**: **The Wolf House – Natalia Geisse, Cristóbal León, Joaquín Cociña, art directors (Chile)**; La Noria – Carlos Zaragoza, art director; Dei Gaztelumendi, character designer (Spain); Agouro – David Doutel, Vasco Sá, art directors and character designers (France, Portugal)	**Best Animation Design**: **Paper Port: "La vida de los otros" – Hugo Covarrubias, director de animación; Enrique Ortega, lead animator (Argentina, Brazil, Chile, Colombia)**; La Noria – Carlos Baena, director de animación (Spain); Lino: Uma Aventura de Sete Vidas – Fernando Herrera, Daniel Cavalcante, directors de animación (Brazil)
**Best Sound Design and Original Music**: **Black Is Beltza – Fermín Muguruza, sound design; Raül Refree, original music (Spain)**; Entre Sombras – Pedro Marques, original music; Kévin Feildel, sound design (France, Portugal); Virus Tropical – Adriana García, original music; Andrés Silva, Alejandro Uribe-Holguín, Manuel José Gordillo, sound design (Colombia)

=== 2020 ===
**Best Ibero-American Feature Film**: **Klaus – Sergio Pablos, director; Marisa Roman, producer (Spain)**; El Patalarga – Mercedes Moreira, director and producer (Argentina); Turu, the Wacky Hen – Víctor Monigote, Eduardo Gondell, directors; Cristina Zumárraga, Pablo Enrique Bossi, Pablo Bossi, Agustín Bossi, Juan Pablo Buscarini, Luis Scalella, Carlos Fernández, Laura Fernández, producers (Argentina, Spain); Relatos de Reconciliación – Carlos Santa, Rubén Monroy, directors and producers (Colombia)	**Best Ibero-American Series**: **Tainá e os guardiões da Amazônia – André Forni, director; Carolina Fregatti, producer (Brazil)**; Crias – Crocodilos – Mélia Gilson, Camille Authouart, directors; Joana Peralta, Ana Carina Estróia, producers (France, Portugal); Momonsters – Javier Martínez, Alberto Martínez, directors; Darío Sánchez, producer (Spain); Space Chickens in Space – Tommy Vad Flaaten, Markus Vad Flaaten, directors; Fernando de Fuentes S., José C. García de Letona, producers (Australia, Ireland, Mexico, United Kingdom)
**Best Ibero-American Short Film**: **El Pájarocubo – Jorge Alberto Vega, director; Angela Maria Revelo, producer (Colombia)**; Purpleboy – Alexandre Siqueira, director; Rodrigo Areias, Mickaël Carton, Thierry Zamparutti, Serge Kestemont, producers (Belgium, France, Portugal); Tio Tomás a Contabilidade Dos Dias – Regina Pessoa, director; Abi Feijó, Julie Roy, Reginald De Guillebon, producers (Canada, France, Brazil)	**Best Ibero-American School Short Film**: **Nestor (Royal College of Art) – João Gonzalez, director and producer (Portugal, United Kingdom)**; Gravedad (Film Academy Baden-Württemberg) – Matisse Gonzalez, director and producer (Germany, Bolivia); Só Sei Que Foi Assim (Cinema de Animação – Centro de Artes UFPEL) – Giovanna Muzel Da Paixao, director and producer (Brazil)
**Best Commissioned Film**: **Mate? – Buda.tv, directors and producers (Argentina, Bolivia, Brazil, Chile, Paraguay, Uruguay)**; In Your Hands – Ralph Karam, director; Juan Manuel Freire, producer (Argentina); Tenemos Voz – Juan Manuel Costa, director and producer (Argentina)	**Best Video Game Animation**: **Gris – Adrián Miguel Delgado, animation director (Spain)**; Shadow Brawlers – Martin Gil, animation director (Argentina); Very Little Nightmares – Marc Terris, Xavi Terris, animation directors (Spain)
**Best Visual Development**: **O Peculiar Crime do Estranho Sr. Jacinto – Ana Bossa, art direction and character design (France, Portugal)**; Nestor – João Gonzalez, art direction and character design (Portugal, United Kingdom); Tio Tomás a Contabilidade Dos Dias – Regina Pessoa, art direction and character design (Canada, France, Portugal)	**Best Animation Design**: **Klaus – Sergio Pablos, animation director; Sergio Martins, Charlie Bonifacio, Victor Ens, Yoshi Tamura, lead animators (Spain)**; Nestor – João Gonzalez, animation director and lead animator (Portugal, United Kingdom); Tio Tomás a Contabilidade Dos Dias – Regina Pessoa, animation director and lead animator (Canada, France, Portugal)
**Best Sound Design and Original Music**: **Nestor – João Gonzalez, original music (Portugal, United Kingdom)**; Drawing Life – Flavio Pereira, sound design (Brazil); Klaus – Gabriel Gutiérrez, sound design; Alfonso González Aguilar, original music (Spain)

=== 2021 ===
**Best Ibero-American Feature Film**: **A Costume for Nicholas – Eduardo Rivero, director; Miguel Angel Uriegas, Genaro Lopez, Eduardo Jimenez, Jaime Romandia, producers (Mexico)**; Xico's Journey – Eric Cabello Díaz, director; Cristina Pineda, producer (Mexico); Cranston Academy: Monster Zone – Leopoldo Aguilar, director; Fernando De Fuentes, José Carlos García De Letona, Gregory Gavanski, producers (Mexico, United States); Nahuel and the Magic Book – Germán Acuña, director; Germán Acuña, Sebastian Ruz, Sabrina Bogado, Livia Pagano, producers (Brazil, Chile)	**Best Ibero-American Series**: **Petit – Bernardita Ojeda, director; Daniela Ponce, producer (Argentina, Chile, Colombia)**; Conta Conmigo – Andrés Lieban, Alessandro Monnerat, directors; Andrés Lieban, André Breitman, Peter Moss, producers (Brazil); Los Zurf – Alex Cervantes, director; Alex Cervantes, Emilio Gallego, Jesus Gallego, Álvaro García González, producers (Spain); Yo, Elvis Riboldi – Javier Galán, Raphaël Lamarque, directors; Iván Agenjo, Philippe Alessandri, producers (Spain, France)
**Best Ibero-American Short Film**: **Homeless Home – Alberto Vázquez, director; Iván Miñambres, Nicolas Schmerkin, producers (Spain, France)**; Elo – Alexandra Ramires, director; David Doutel, Laurence Reymond, Rodrigo Areias, producers (France, Portugal); Roberto – Carmen Córdoba González, director and producer (Spain)	**Best Ibero-American School Short Film**: **Memories for Sale (Universidad Veritas) – Manuel Lopez, director and producer (Costa Rica)**; La Bestia (Gobelins, l'école de l'image) – Ram Tamez, Alfredo Gerard Kuttikatt, Marlijn Van Nuenen, directors; Moïra Marguin, producer (France, Mexico); Le Retour des Vagues (Gobelins, l'école de l'image) – Alejandra Guevara Cervera, Manon Cansell, Edward Kurchevsky, Francisco Moutinho de Magalhães, Hortense Mariano, directors; Moïra Marguin, producer (France, Mexico, Portugal)
**Best Commissioned Film**: **Rutas – Alejandro Imondi, director; Rosario Carlino, producer (Argentina)**; Pixelatl 2020 – Francisco Zamudio, director; Francisco Navarro, Karla Romero, producers (Mexico); Stormzy's "Superheroes" – Taz Tron Delix, director; Agustin Valcarenghi, Pablo Gostanian, producers (Argentina, United Kingdom)	**Best Video Game Animation**: **Gylt – Arturo Paiva, animation director (Spain)**; Adore – Diogo Carneiro, animation director (Brazil); El Niño Antimateria – Kevin Rutolo, animation director (Argentina)
**Best Visual Development**: **Elo – Alexandra Ramires, art direction and character design (France, Portugal)**; Petit – Wladimir González, art direction; Vicente Casas, character design; Isol Misenta, original illustrations (Argentina, Chile, Colombia); Wayback – Carlos Salgado, art direction and character design (Spain)	**Best Animation Design**: **Umbrellas – Thierry Torres, animation director and lead animator (Spain, France)**; Homeless Home – Khris Cembe, animation director and lead animator (Spain, France); Nahuel and the Magic Book – Enrique Ocampo, animation director; Rosamary Martinez, lead animator (Brazil, Chile); Wayback – Carlos Salgado, animation director; Raúl Echegaráy, Rubén Fernández, Asís Merino and Alberto Sánchez, lead animators (Spain)
**Best Sound Design and Original Music**: **Loop – Joseba Beristain, sound design and original music (Argentina, Spain)**; Alebrijes – Guateque Cine, José Delgadillo, Diana Martínez, sound design; Edgar Marún, Tomás Arenas, original music (Colombia); Wayback – Gabriel Gutiérrez, sound design; Lost Twin – Carlos R. Pinto, original music (Spain)

=== 2022 ===
**Best Ibero-American Feature Film**: **Bob Cuspe – Nós Não Gostamos de Gente – Cesar Cabral, director; Ivan Melo, Cesar Cabral, producers (Brazil)**; Ainbo: Spirit of the Amazon – Jose Zelada, Richard Claus, directors; Cesar Zelada, producer (Netherlands, Peru); Meu Tio José – Ducca Rios, director; Maria Luiza Barros, producer (Brazil); Valentina – Chelo Loureiro, director; Chelo Loureiro, Mariano Baratech, Brandán De Brano, Noa García, Luis Da Matta, producers (Spain, Portugal)	**Best Ibero-American Series**: **Frankelda's Book of Spooks – Arturo and Roy Ambriz, directors and producers (Mexico)**; Dos Pajaritos – Alfredo Soderguit, Alejo Schettini, directors; Luciana Roude, Alfredo Soderguit, producers (Argentina, Colombia, Uruguay); Zander – Enrique Ortega, director; Pablo Arias, producer (Chile, Colombia)
**Best Ibero-American Short Film**: **Bestia – Hugo Covarrubias, director; Tevo Díaz, producer (Chile)**; Leopoldo el del bar – Diego Porral, director; Joaquín Garralda, producer (Spain); Tío – Juan Medina, director and producer (Mexico)	**Best Ibero-American School Short Film**: **Las Moscas Solo Viven un Día (Technical University of Valencia) – Mauro Luis López, director and producer (Spain)**; Abril (Universidad ORT Uruguay) – Sofia Caponnetto, Eliana Fernández, directors and producers (Uruguay); Lágrimas de Dragón (U-TAD Centro Universitario de Tecnología y Arte Digital) – Íñigo Álvarez, Antonio García Tardón, directors; Patricia Marqueta, producer (Spain)
**Best Commissioned Film**: **#normadegénerobinaria: Niñas – Bernardita Ojeda, director; Cristián Freire, director and producer (Chile)**; Dia de los Muertos – Paulo Garcia, director; Natalia Gouvea, producer (Argentina, Brazil, Mexico); Las Mariposas: How Three Sisters Defied a Dictator – Tomás Pichardo, director; Gerta Xhelo, producer (Dominican Republic)	**Best Video Game Animation**: **Greak: Memories of Azur – Fernando Nicolás Martínez, animation direction (Argentina, Ecuador, Mexico, Venezuela)**; Arrog – Mateo Alayza, animation direction (Peru); Narita Boy – Eduardo Fornieles, animation direction (Spain)
**Best Visual Development**: **Bestia – Hugo Covarrubias, Constanza Wette, art director; Pablo Castillo, Cecilia Toro, character design (Chile)**; Bob Cuspe – Nós Não Gostamos de Gente – Daniel Brusson, art director; Olyntho Tahara, character design (Brazil); Frankelda's Book of Spooks – Ana Coronilla, art director; Diego Ramírez, Sebastián Ramírez, character design (Mexico)	**Best Animation Design**: **Frankelda's Book of Spooks – Beto Petiches, animation direction; Daniel Hernández, Calaka Vargas, Mariano García, lead animators (Mexico)**; Bestia – Hugo Covarrubias, Matias Delgado, animation direction and lead animators (Chile); Bob Cuspe – Nós Não Gostamos de Gente' – Thomas Larson, animation direction and lead animator (Brazil)
**Best Sound Design and Original Music**: **Bob Cuspe – Nós Não Gostamos de Gente – Daniel Turini, sound design; André Abujamra, Márcio Nigro, original music (Brazil)**; Ainbo: Spirit of the Amazon – Jose Zelada, Richard Claus, directors; Cesar Zelada, producer (Netherlands, Peru); Bestia – Roberto Espinoza, Roberto Zúñiga, sound design; Ángela Acuña, Camilo Salinas, original music (Chile)

=== 2023 ===
**Best Ibero-American Feature Film**: **Nayola – José Miguel Ribeiro (Belgium, France, Netherlands, Portugal)**; The Other Shape – Diego Guzmán (Brazil, Colombia); Tromba Trem – O Filme – Zé Brandão (Brazil); Unicorn Wars – Alberto Vázquez (Spain)	**Best Ibero-American Series**: **Jasmine & Jambo – Sílvia Cortés (Spain)**; La Orquestita – Juan Carve (Argentina, Colombia, Spain, Peru, Uruguay); Petit – Bernardita Ojeda (Argentina, Chile, Colombia, Spain); Polinopolis – María Antolini, Martin Guido (Argentina, Spain, France, Mexico)
**Best Ibero-American Short Film**: **O Homem do Lixo – Laura Gonçalves (Portugal)**; Pasajero – Juan Pablo Zaramella (Argentina); Ice Merchants – João Gonzalez (France, Portugal, United Kingdom)	**Best Ibero-American School Short Film**: **Chimborazo (Technical University of Valencia) – Keila Cepeda (Ecuador, Spain)**; Carlos Montaña (National University of Córdoba) – Ita Romero (Argentina); Papirola (Technical University of Valencia) – Fabián Molinaro (Spain)
**Best Commissioned Film**: **Este Perro está Raro – Facundo Quiroga, Juan Nadalino, Sebastian García (Argentina)**; Despertar Juntas – Claudia Prezioso (Uruguay); El Arte de Recuperarte – Dante Zaballa (Argentina)	**Best Video Game Animation**: **Endling: Extinction is Forever – Javier Ramello, Pablo Hernández (Spain)**; Atuel – Pablo Quarta (Argentina); Han'yo – Leyre Fernández (Spain)
**Best Visual Development**: **Ice Merchants – João Gonzalez, art direction and character design (France, Portugal, United Kingdom)**; Nayola – José Miguel Ribeiro, art direction; David Silva, Paula Custódio, character design(Belgium, France, Netherlands, Portugal); Pasajero – Juan Pablo Zaramella, art direction and character design (Argentina)	**Best Animation Design**: **Pasajero – Juan Pablo Zaramella, animation director and lead animator (Argentina)**; O Homem do Lixo – Laura Gonçalves, animation director and lead animator (Portugal); Ice Merchants – João Gonzalez, animation director and lead animator (France, Portugal, United Kingdom)
**Best Sound Design and Original Music**: **Garrano – Pedro Marinho, Bernardo Bento, sound design; Jonas Jurkunas, original music (Lithuania, Portugal)**; O Homem do Lixo – Bernardo Bento, Pedro Marinho, sound design; Ricardo Santos Rocha, original music (Portugal); Ice Merchants – Ed Trouseeau, sound design; João Gonzalez, original music (France, Portugal, United Kingdom); Pasajero – Cecilia Castro, Hernán Kerlleñevich, sound design and original music (Argentina)

=== 2024 ===
**Best Ibero-American Feature Film**: **Robot Dreams – Pablo Berger (Spain, France)**; El Paraíso – Fernando Sirianni, Federico Breser (Argentina); Hannah and the Monsters – Lorena Ares (Spain); Sultana's Dream – Isabel Herguera (Spain, Germany)	**Best Ibero-American Series**: **Jasmine & Jambo – Silvia Cortés (Spain)**; O Hotel Silvestre de Ana Flor – Andrés Lieban, Alessandro Monnerat (Brazil); O Menino Maluquinho – Michele Massagli, Beto Gomez (Brazil); Pobre Diablo – Miguel Esteban (Spain); Sex Symbols – Paloma Mora IÑesta, Alex Cervantes (Spain)
**Best Ibero-American Short Film**: **Lulina e a Lua – Marcus Vinicius Vasconcelos, Alois Di Leo (Brazil)**; Quase me Lembro – Miguel Lima, Dimitrije Mihajlovic (Portugal); To Bird or Not to Bird – Martín Romero (Spain)	**Best Ibero-American School Short Film**: **La Fuga (KASK & Conservatorium Hogeschool Gent, Vrije Universiteit Brussel) – Paola Cubillos (Colombia, Belgium)**; Carcinização (Federal University of Pelotas) – Denis Souza (Brazil); Shell Shock (Escena, Escuela de Animación y Artes Creativas) – Emilio Ramirez Castro (Mexico)
**Best Commissioned Film**: **Star Wars: Visions: "In the Stars" – Gabriel Osorio Vargas (Chile, United States)**; Somos Pajaritos – Gabriela Badillo (Mexico); Star Wars: Visions: "Sith" – Rodrigo Blaas (Spain, United States)	**Best Music Video**: **"I Inside the Old I Dying" by PJ Harvey – Cristobal León & Joaquín Cociña (Chile)**; "All the Best" by SIAMÉS – Pablo Roldán (Argentina); "O Futuro que me Alcance" by Reynaldo Bessa – Nat Grego (Brazil)
**Best Video Game Animation**: **The Many Pieces of Mr. Coo – Nacho Rodríguez, director and animator (Spain)**; American Arcadia – Tatiana Delgado Yunquera, director; Alfredo González-Barros Camba, Alejandro de la Rosa Toro, Antonio García Palacios, animators (Spain); Anyu – Antipodas Studio, DigiPen Europe-Bilbao, directors; Gonzalo Ernesto Fernández, animator (Spain)	**Best Visual Development**: **Sultana's Dream – Isabel Herguera, art direction; Isabel Herguera, Rocío Álvarez, Elena Jariego Antón, Duna Tàrrega, character design (Spain, Germany)**; Robot Dreams – José Luis Ágreda, art direction; Daniel Fernández Casas, character design (Spain, France); Star Wars: Visions: "Sith" – Carlos Salgado, art direction; Linda Chen, Jonatan Catalan, Pablo Dominguez, character design (Spain, United States)
**Best Animation Design**: **Cold Soup – Marta Monteiro, Daniela Duarte, animation directors; Daniela Duarte, lead animator (Portugal, France)**; Star Wars: Visions: "In the Stars" – Francisco Leiva, animation director; Edgar Sepúlveda, lead animator (Chile, United States); Lulina e a Lua – Henrique Lobato, animation director and lead animator (Brazil)	**Best Sound Design and Original Music**: **Robot Dreams – Fabiola Ordoyo, sound design; Alfonso Vilallonga, original music (Spain, France)**; Jasmine & Jambo – Marc Parrot, sound design and original music (Spain); Lulina e a Lua – Marília Mencucini, sound design; Alicio Amaral, original music (Brazil)

== See also ==
- Platino Award for Best Animated Film
- Goya Award for Best Animated Film
- Goya Award for Best Animated Short Film
