= Platino Award for Best Animated Film =

- Awarded for: Best Animated Film of the Year
- Country: Ibero-America
- Presented by: Entidad de Gestión de Derechos de los Productores Audiovisuales (EGEDA), Federación Iberoamericana de Productores Cinematográficos y Audiovisuales (FIPCA)
- Currently held by: Olivia & the Clouds (2026)
- Website: premiosplatino.com

The Platino Award for Best Animated Picture (Spanish: Premio Platino a la mejor película de animación) is one of the Platino Awards, Ibero-America's film awards, presented by the Entidad de Gestión de Derechos de los Productores Audiovisuales (EGEDA) and the Federación Iberoamericana de Productores Cinematográficos y Audiovisuales (FIPCA).

== History ==
It was first presented in 2014, with Argentine-Spanish production Underdogs being the first recipient of the award. Spain holds the record of most wins in the category with seven wins.

2015 winner Boy and the World, 2020 nominee Klaus and 2024 winner Robot Dreams also received nominations for the Academy Award for Best Animated Feature. Additionally, both Boy and the World and Robot Dreams won the Annie Award for Best Animated Feature – Independent while Buñuel in the Labyrinth of the Turtles was also nominated for said award.

== Awards and nominations ==
In the list below the winner of the award for each year is shown first, followed by the other nominees.

=== 2010s ===
Year	English title	Original title	Director	Country
2014 (1st)	Underdogs	Metegol	Juan José Campanella	Argentina; Spain
2014 (1st)	Anina		Alfredo Soderguit	Uruguay; Colombia
2014 (1st)	El secreto del medallón de jade		Leopoldo Aguilar & Rodolfo Guzmán	Mexico
2014 (1st)	Rio 2096: A Story of Love and Fury	Uma História de Amor e Fúria	Luiz Bolognesi	Brazil
2014 (1st)	Justin and the Knights of Valour	Justin y la espada de valor	Manuel Sicilia	Spain
2015 (2nd)	Boy and the World	O Menino e o Mundo	Alê Abreu	Brazil
2015 (2nd)	Mummy, I'm a Zombie	Mamá, soy una zombi	Beñat Beitia & Ricardo Ramón	Spain
2015 (2nd)	Mortadelo and Filemon: Mission Implausible	Mortadelo y Filemón contra Jimmy el Cachondo	Javier Fesser	Spain
2015 (2nd)	Até que a Sbórnia nos Separe		Otto Guerra & Ennio Torresan Jr.	Brazil
2015 (2nd)	La leyenda de las momias de Guanajuato		Alberto Rodríguez	Mexico
2015 (2nd)	Meñique		Ernesto Padrón	Cuba; Spain
2016 (3rd)	Capture the Flag	Atrapa la bandera	Enrique Gato	Spain
2016 (3rd)	Top Cat Begins	Don Gato: El Inicio de la Pandilla	Andrés Couturier	Mexico
2016 (3rd)	El Americano: The Movie	El americano	Ricardo Arnaiz & Mike Kunkel	Mexico
2016 (3rd)	Un gallo con muchos huevos		Gabriel Riva Palacio & Rodolfo Riva Palacio	Mexico
2016 (3rd)	El secreto de Amila		Gorka Vázquez	Argentina; Spain
2017 (4th)	Birdboy: The Forgotten Children	Psiconautas, los niños olvidados	Alberto Vásquez & Pedro Rivero	Spain
2017 (4th)	Bruxarias		Virgínia Curiá	Brazil; Spain
2017 (4th)	La leyenda del Chupacabras		Alberto Rodríguez	Mexico
2017 (4th)	Ozzy		Alberto Rodríguez & Nacho La Casa	Spain
2017 (4th)	Teresa y Tim		Agurtzane Intxaurraga	Spain
2018 (5th)	Tad Jones: The Hero Returns	Tadeo Jones 2: El secreto del rey Midas	Enrique Gato & David Alonso	Spain
2018 (5th)	Lila's Book	El libro de Lila	Marcela Rincón	Colombia; Uruguay
2018 (5th)	Deep		Julio Soto Gúrpide	Spain
2018 (5th)	História Antes de uma História		Wilson Lazaretti	Brazil
2018 (5th)	Lino: Uma Aventura de Sete Vidas		Rafael Ribas	Brazil
2019 (6th)	Another Day of Life	Un día más con vida	Raul de la Fuente	Spain
2019 (6th)	The Wolf House	La casa lobo	Cristobal León & Joaquín Cociña	Chile
2019 (6th)	Memoirs of a Man in Pajamas	Memorias de un hombre en pijama	Carlos Fernández de Vigo	Spain
2019 (6th)	Virus Tropical		Santiago Caicedo	Colombia

=== 2020s ===
Year	English title	Original title	Director	Country
2020 (7th)	Buñuel in the Labyrinth of the Turtles	Buñuel en el laberinto de las tortugas	Salvador Simó	Spain
2020 (7th)	A Cidade dos Piratas		Otto Guerra	Brazil
2020 (7th)	Elcano & Magellan: The First Voyage Around the World	Elcano y Magallanes, la primera vuelta al mundo	Ángel Alonso	Spain
2020 (7th)	Klaus		Sergio Pablos	Spain
2021 (8th)	Turu, the Wacky Hen	La gallina Turuleca	Eduardo Gondell & Víctor Monigote	Spain; Argentina
2021 (8th)	El camino de Xico		Eric Cabello	Mexico
2021 (8th)	A Costume for Nicholas	Un disfraz para Nicolas	Eduardo Rivero	Mexico
2021 (8th)	The Red Scroll	O Pergaminho Vermelho	Nelson Botter Jr.	Brazil
2022 (9th)	Ainbo: Spirit of the Amazon	Ainbo, la guerrera del Amazonas	José Zelada & Richard Claus	Peru
2022 (9th)	Bob Spit: We Do Not Like People	Bob Cuspe - Nós Não Gostamos de Gente	Cesar Cabral	Brazil
2022 (9th)	Salvar el Árbol (Zutik!)		Iker Alvarez & Haizea Pastor	Spain; Brazil; Mexico
2022 (9th)	Valentina		Chelo Loureiro	Spain; Portugal
2023 (10th)	Águila y Jaguar: Los Guerreros Legendarios		Mike R. Ortiz	Mexico
2023 (10th)	El paraíso		Fernando Sirianni, Federico Moreno Breser	Argentina
2023 (10th)	Tad, the Lost Explorer and the Emerald Tablet	Tadeo Jones 3: La tabla esperalda	Enrique Gato	Spain
2023 (10th)	Unicorn Wars		Alberto Vázquez	Spain
2024 (11th)	Robot Dreams		Pablo Berger	Spain
2024 (11th)	They Shot the Piano Player	Dispararon al pianista	Fernando Trueba, Javier Mariscal	Spain; Portugal; Peru
2024 (11th)	Sultana's Dream	El sueño de la sultana	Isabel Herguera	Spain
2024 (11th)	Home Is Somewhere Else		Carlos Hagerman, Jorge Villalobos	Mexico
2024 (11th)	Nayola		José Miguel Ribeiro	Portugal
2025 (12th)	Black Butterflies	Mariposas negras	David Baute	Spain; Panama
2025 (12th)	Captain Avispa	Capitán Avispa	Jean Gabriel Guerra, Jonathan Melendez	Dominican Republic
2025 (12th)	Dalia and the Red Book	Dalia y el libro rojo	David Bisbano	Argentina; Brazil; Colombia; Ecuador; Spain; Peru
2025 (12th)	Dragonkeeper	Guardiana de dragones	Salvador Simó, Li Jianping	Spain
2025 (12th)	Noah's Ark	Arca de Noé	Sérgio Machado, Alos di Leo	Brazil
2026 (13th)	Olivia & the Clouds	Olivia & las nubes	Tomás Pichardo Espaillat	Dominican Republic
2026 (13th)	Decorado		Alberto Vázquez	Spain
2026 (13th)	Kayara		Cesar Zelada	Peru; Spain
2026 (13th)	I Am Frankelda	Soy Frankelda	Arturo and Roy Ambriz	Mexico

== Awards by nation ==
Country	Awards (as of 2026)	Nominations (as of 2026)
Spain	9	30
Argentina	2	5
Mexico	1	12
Brazil	1	12
Peru	1	4
Dominican Republic	1	2
Panama	1	1
Colombia	0	4
Portugal	0	3
Uruguay	0	2
Cuba	0	1
Chile	0	1
Ecuador	0	1

== See also ==
- Goya Award for Best Animated Film
- Academy Award for Best Animated Feature
- Annie Award for Best Animated Feature – Independent
