= Robot Dreams =

Robot Dreams may refer to:

- Robot Dreams (short story collection), a 1986 book by Isaac Asimov
  - "Robot Dreams" (short story), the title story
- Robot Dreams (graphic novel), a 2007 graphic novel by Sara Varon
- Robot Dreams (film), a 2023 animated film
