= Sultana's Dream =

1905 novel by Begum Rokeya

- Author: Begum Rokeya
- Language: English
- Genre: Feminist, Utopian fiction
- Publisher: The Indian Ladies Magazine
- Publication date: 1905
- Publication place: British India
- Preceded by: Matichur 1st Vol. (1904)
- Followed by: Matichur 2nd Vol. (1922)

Sultana's Dream is a 1905 Bengali feminist utopian story in English, one of the earliest proto-feminist texts in its genre, written by Begum Rokeya, also known as Rokeya Sakhawat Hossain, a Muslim feminist, writer and social reformer from Bengal. It was published in the same year in Madras-based English periodical The Indian Ladies Magazine. (Note: The word sultana here means a female sultan, a Muslim ruler.)

== Plot ==
It depicts a science fiction feminist utopia called Ladyland, in which women run everything and men are secluded, in a mirror-image of the traditional practice of purdah. The women are aided by technology which enables labourless farming and flying cars; the women scientists have discovered how to trap solar power and control the weather. This results in "a sort of gender-based Planet of the Apes where the roles are reversed and the men are locked away in a technologically advanced future."

In the story, traditional stereotypes such as “Men have bigger brains” and women are "naturally weak" are countered with logic such as "an elephant also has a bigger and heavier brain" and “a lion is stronger than a man” and yet neither of them dominates men. In Ladyland crime is eliminated, since men were considered responsible for all of it. The workday is only two hours long, since men used to waste six hours of each day in smoking. The religion is one of love and truth. Purity is held above all, such that the list of "sacred relations" (mahram) is widely extended.

== Origin of the story ==
According to Rokeya, she wrote Sultana's Dream as a way to pass the time while her husband, Khan Bahadur Syed Sakhawat Hossain, a deputy magistrate, was away on a tour. Her husband was an appreciative audience and encouraged her to read and write in English. Thus, writing Sultana's Dream in English was a way of demonstrating her proficiency in the language to her husband. Sakhawat was very impressed by the story and encouraged her to submit the piece to The Indian Ladies Magazine, which published the story for the first time in 1905. The story was later published in book form in 1908.

Rokeya (1880-1932) was born into a rich family who owned property and land. Though she knew how to read and write in Urdu, she was prevented from learning Bengali and English. In those days, English was seen as a language that would expose girls to new ideas, which society thought unsuitable. Rokeya learned to read and write English and Bangla with the help of her elder sister and elder brother. She wrote Sultana's Dream when she was merely 25 years old. In 1910, she started a school for girls in Kolkata and to this day, the school is in operation.

== In art and film ==
In 2018, the Indian-American artist Chitra Ganesh created 27 linocuts to illustrate the story.

In 2021 it was produced as a 10 minute short film in Pakistan, which is available on YouTube. The film was directed and written by Amneh Shaikh-Farooqui, and animated by Tooba Kazim. It was produced with the support of the British Council in Pakistan for the WOW Festival.

In 2023, the Spanish artist and filmmaker Isabel Herguera released an animated movie inspired by Sultana's Dream and Begum Rokeya.

In 2025, Indian artist Kruthika N.S. created a pop-up book exhibit inspired by Sultana's Dream and the work of Begum Rokeya.

== UNESCO Memory of The World ==
In 2024, the UNESCO's Memory of the World Register in Asia and the Pacific inscribed Sultana's Dream.

== See also ==
- Indian English literature
- Social reformers of India
- The Begum's Fortune, an 1879 utopian science fiction novel by Jules Verne
- Kithaab
