= Unicorn Wars =

- Theatrical release poster
- Directed by: Alberto Vázquez
- Written by: Alberto Vázquez
- Produced by: Chelo Loureiro; Iván Miñambres; Nicolas Schmerkin
- Starring: Jon Goiri; Jaione Insausti
- Narrated by: Ramón Barea
- Edited by: Iñigo Gómez; Estanis Bañuelos
- Music by: Joseba Beristain; Víctor García
- Production companies: Eurimages; Abano Producións; Uniko; Unicorn Wars AIE; Autour de Minuit; Schmuby Productions; TVE
- Distributed by: Barton Films (Spain); UFO Distribution (France)
- Release dates: 16 June 2022 (Annecy); 21 October 2022 (Spain); 28 December 2022 (France)
- Running time: 92 minutes
- Countries: Spain; France
- Language: Spanish
- Budget: €3 million
- Box office: €28960.22

Unicorn Wars is a 2022 animated splatter war film written and directed by Alberto Vázquez. The plot is set against the backdrop of a conflict between anthropomorphized teddy bears and wild unicorns, following two bear siblings deployed in a military mission to a magical forest.

A Spanish-French co-production, the film won Best Animated Film at the 37th Goya Awards. It was also nominated for Best Animated Film at the 10th Platino Awards.

== Plot ==
In a magical forest, unicorns and bears lived alongside wild animals, but the bears found a sacred book of knowledge within the ruins of a church. The book enabled the bears to gain sentience and form their own civilization. Over time, the bears physically evolved to a multi-colored "teddy bear" form. According to their beliefs, the bears wanted to cultivate the forest, but the unicorns opposed them. In reality due to the bears' deforestation the unicorns decided to retaliate and exile the bears from the forest. This led to a war between them, which the bears believe will end when their "chosen one" drinks the blood of the last unicorn, and a god-like being will return to the forest.

Drill sergeant Caricias trains new army recruits, including twin brothers Gordi and Azulín. Their chaplain instills the troops with a religious doctrine of hatred for the unicorns. Azulín pretends to protect Gordi; hoping to one day become the Chosen One, he aspires to be the best recruit, but grows resentful of the troop's top recruit, Coco. He has also envied his brother since birth; Gordi had come out first, gaining the favor of their mother. When she left their father for another man, Azulín's jealousy grew so vicious that he poisoned his mother's lemonade, killing her.

Azulín and Gordi's unit is sent into the forest of wilderness to find a missing squad, led by Caricias and the chaplain. They find caterpillars which they consider eating, when they were shown by little fox; the chaplain warns that the scripture says not to eat them, but Caricias angrily defies the warning. The caterpillars turn out to be hallucinogenic; the troops see frightening hallucinations that cost the lives of two recruits. Later on, they find the mutilated remains of the missing squad members, and Caricias goes insane as a result. Soon after, they hunt and stumble upon a lone unicorn named Carmen and kill her, but other herd of unicorns appear and fight the recruits; only Azulín, Gordi and a wounded Coco make it out. Azulín's rage against Coco explodes, and he kills and cannibalizes Coco's corpse.

The brothers find two other unicorns. Azulín badly wounds one of them, a filly named María, but gets impaled by the other unicorn, Laura, and falls into a river, severely disfiguring the right side of his face in the fall. The river sweeps Azulín away, where Corporal Pompon and Privates Peludito and Grimaldo find him. While Azulín recuperates in the hospital, the military's leaders Colonel Otto, Commander Fluffy, and Captain Snout appear before him. They promote Azulín to Lieutenant, and present him as a hero to inspire the soldiers. He is also provided with a mask to cover the disfigured half of his face. Back at the forest, Gordi takes pity on María and nurses her back to health. Before the fight and scuffle, María had stumbled upon the church and found the building now occupied by simians.

Azulín grows so popular among the soldiers that he leads a coup, killing the military leaders and organizing the bear army for a final massive assault to raze the forest. The remaining unicorns all unite to confront the bears one last time. At the height of the brutal battle, both sides annihilate each other: only the two brothers and María survive. Azulín and Gordi reunite, but when Azulín sees Gordi helping María, his rage boils over and he kills them both, drinking her blood to finally fulfill the prophecy. However, María's body morphs into a formless monster that consumes Gordi's body and also Azulín. At last, the monster morphs into the god-like creature foretold, a human being, who leads the simians as the new rulers of the world.

== Voice cast ==
Names in parentheses are the English-version names if they differ from the originals.

- Jon Goiri as Azulín ("Bluey")
- Jaione Insausti as Gordi ("Tubby")
- Ramón Barea as Narrator / Rafael
- Txema Regalado as Padre ("Father")
- Maribel Legarreta as Judith / Young Azulín
- Itxaso Quintana as María
- Manu Heras as Drill Sergeant Caricias ("Ironstroke") / Papá
- Gaizka Soria as Coco
- Kepa Cueto as Colonel Otto
- Juan Carlos Loriz as Commander Fluffy
- Estívaliz Lizárraga as Pandi / Coco's Wife
- Iker Díaz as Achuchones ("Snuggles")
- Pedro Arrieta as Blackie
- Alberto Vázquez as Sonrisas ("Smiley")

== Production ==
Alberto Vázquez said he had three main inspirations when writing: Apocalypse Now, Bambi and the Bible. The project was showcased in a 'Work in Progress' panel of the 45th Annecy International Animation Film Festival. A Spanish-French co-production by Abano Producións SL, Uniko Estudio Creativo S.L., Unicorn Wars AIE, Autour de Minuit, Productions SARL, and Schmuby Productions SAS, the film received funding from Eurimages.

== Music ==
=== Score ===
Joseba Beristain composed the film's original score, featuring Orfeón Donostiarra on selected pieces. The score was released as Unicorn Wars (Original Motion Picture Soundtrack) by Quartet Records on 21 October 2022. The released score contains the following tracks:

Unicorn Wars (Original Motion Picture Soundtrack)
| No. | Title | Artist(s) | Length |
|---|---|---|---|
| 1. | "El bosque mágico" | Joseba Beristain and Orfeón Donostiarra | 1:49 |
| 2. | "¿Aún no tiene forma?" | Joseba Beristain and Orfeón Donostiarra | 1:53 |
| 3. | "El Libro Sagrado (1)" | Joseba Beristain and Orfeón Donostiarra | 1:52 |
| 4. | "Hacia lo desconocido" | Joseba Beristain | 1:08 |
| 5. | "El amor es complicado" | Joseba Beristain | 1:41 |
| 6. | "Hacia lo desconocido (2)" | Joseba Beristain | 1:23 |
| 7. | "No me toques" | Joseba Beristain | 0:42 |
| 8. | "Dios nunca puede esperar" | Joseba Beristain | 2:02 |
| 9. | "Qué es la muerte, si no sabemos lo que es la vida" | Joseba Beristain and Orfeón Donostiarra | 0:48 |
| 10. | "El bosque también enferma" | Joseba Beristain and Orfeón Donostiarra | 2:47 |
| 11. | "El bosque mágico (2)" | Joseba Beristain and Orfeón Donostiarra | 1:54 |
| 12. | "La naturaleza es nuestra madre" | Joseba Beristain | 2:05 |
| 13. | "Magia reparadora" | Joseba Beristain | 0:47 |
| 14. | "Emboscada" | Joseba Beristain | 0:44 |
| 15. | "Se acercan" | Joseba Beristain | 1:42 |
| 16. | "Yo siempre fui el segundo" | Joseba Beristain | 0:54 |
| 17. | "Los actos tienen consecuencias" | Joseba Beristain | 1:46 |
| 18. | "Prométeme una cosa" | Joseba Beristain | 0:52 |
| 19. | "Ensoñación" | Joseba Beristain | 1:45 |
| 20. | "No sé que voy a hacer con este niño" | Joseba Beristain | 2:00 |
| 21. | "Ataque a los unicornios" | Joseba Beristain | 1:55 |
| 22. | "En el río" | Joseba Beristain and Orfeón Donostiarra | 0:23 |
| 23. | "El Libro Sagrado (2)" | Joseba Beristain | 0:26 |
| 24. | "Daños colaterales" | Joseba Beristain and Orfeón Donostiarra | 1:16 |
| 25. | "El tiempo ha llegado" | Joseba Beristain and Orfeón Donostiarra | 7:25 |
| 26. | "¿Quién eres?" | Joseba Beristain | 4:40 |
| Total length: | | | 46:52 |

=== Soundtrack ===
The film's soundtrack also includes music by Víctor García, credited as Death Whistle, and the band Hongo.

Featured songs
| No. | Title | Artist(s) | Length |
|---|---|---|---|
| 1. | "Viaje Inesperado" | Víctor García (Death Whistle) | 2:57 |
| 2. | "El agujero negro del hombre" | Víctor García (Death Whistle) | 2:21 |
| 3. | "Respirando Odio" | Hongo | 5:15 |

== Release ==
The film was presented at the 46th Annecy International Animation Film Festival on 16 June 2022, as part of the festival's official competition. It made its US premiere at the Fantastic Fest. Distributed by Barton Films, the film was theatrically released in Spain on 21 October 2022. Charades handled the sales elsewhere. It was released in French theatres on 28 December 2022 by UFO Distribution. The film received a limited theatrical release in North America on 10 March 2023.

== Reception ==
On Rotten Tomatoes, the film has an 80% rating based on 30 reviews from critics with an average rating of 7.20/10, with the critics' consensus reading "While its humor may strike some as needlessly crude, Unicorn Wars is a visually audacious strike against cultural and military fascism". On Metacritic, the film has a weighted average of 73 out of 100 based on 7 critic reviews, indicating "generally positive reviews".

== Accolades ==
| Year | Award | Category | Nominee(s) | Result | Ref. |
|---|---|---|---|---|---|
| 2023 | 10th Feroz Awards | Arrebato Award (Fiction) | | Nominated | |
| 2023 | 78th CEC Medals | Best Animated Film | | Nominated | |
| 2023 | 37th Goya Awards | Best Animated Film | | Won | |
| 2023 | 37th Goya Awards | Best Original Song | "Batalla" by Joseba Beristain | Nominated | |
| 2023 | 21st Mestre Mateo Awards | Best Director | Alberto Vázquez | Nominated | |
| 2023 | 21st Mestre Mateo Awards | Best Screenplay | Alberto Vázquez | Nominated | |
| 2023 | 21st Mestre Mateo Awards | Best Art Direction | Alberto Vázquez | Nominated | |
| 2023 | 21st Mestre Mateo Awards | Best Animated Film | | Won | |
| 2023 | 21st Mestre Mateo Awards | Best Editing | Íñigo Gómez, Estanis Bañuelos | Nominated | |
| 2023 | 21st Mestre Mateo Awards | Best Sound | Iñaki Alonso | Nominated | |
| 2023 | 10th Platino Awards | Best Animated Film | | Nominated | |
| 2023 | 6th Quirino Awards | Best Ibero-American Feature Film | | Nominated | |

== See also ==
- List of Spanish films of 2022
- List of French films of 2022
- The Last Unicorn - both the 1968 book and the 1982 film adaptation
