= Punkrobot =

Chilean animation studio

PunkRobot
- Type: Private
- Industry: Animation
- Founded: 2008; 18 years ago
- Founder: Antonia Herrera Oesterheld; Mari Soto-Aguilar; Gabriel Osorio Vargas; Pato Escala Pierart
- Headquarters: Santiago, Chile
- Products: Animated films Television shows YouTube Channels; Web series
- Website: punkrobot.cl

PunkRobot is a Chilean animation studio founded in 2008 by Gabriel Osorio Vargas, Antonia Herrera Oesterheld, Mari Soto-Aguilar, and Pato Escala Pierart.

The studio is best known for producing the short animated film Bear Story (2015), which won for Best Animated Short Film at the 88th Academy Awards.

== History ==
Punkrobot was founded in Santiago in 2008 by Antonia Herrera Oesterheld, Gabriel Osorio Vargas, Mari Soto-Aguilar and Pato Escala Pierart. They released their first preschool show Flipos in 2010 and their second one Las aventuras de Muelín y Perlita in 2013.

In 2014, they made the animated short film Bear Story. The film was a critical success, winning the Oscar for Best Animated Short Film at the 88th Academy Awards, making it the first Chilean film win an Oscar and the first Latin American animation to win or be nominated for an Oscar.

In 2023, PunkRobot made the short "In the Stars", an episode of Star Wars: Visions Volume 2, for Disney+.

In 2024, they produced the preschool series Wow Lisa. The series won the Annie Award for Best Animated Television Production for Preschool in February 2026.

The studios' first original feature film, Brave Cat, premiered at the 2026 Annecy International Animation Film Festival in the category "Annecy Presents", where it won the Audience Award. The movie will be distributed by the French company Indie Sales.

== Filmography ==
=== Films ===
- Nahuel and the Magic Book (2020) - Co-production with Carburadores and Levante Filmes.
- Brave Cat (2026)

=== Short films ===
- Bear Story (2015)
- Star Wars: Visions (2023) - Short: "In the Stars"

=== Television series ===
- Flipos (2010)
- Las aventuras de Muelín y Perlita (2013)
- Guitarra y tambor (2019) co-produced with Hype Animation Studio Brasil
- Wow Lisa (2024)

=== Music videos ===
Year	Song title	Musical artist
2026	"Cantar y amar"	Los Tres
2026	"Como llegaste te vas"	Los Tres
2026	"INRI"	Los Tres

== Awards and nominations ==
=== 2016 ===
- Bear Story: Academy Award for Best Animated Short Film

=== 2024 ===
- In The Stars: Premios Quirino, Mejor animación por encargo

=== 2026 ===
- Wow Lisa: Annie Award for Best Animated Television Production for Preschool

=== 2026 ===
- Brave Cat: Annecy Presents Audience Award, feature film
