= Bear Story =

- Directed by: Gabriel Osorio Vargas
- Screenplay by: Daniel Castro
- Story by: Gabriel Osorio Vargas
- Produced by: Pato Escala Pierart
- Cinematography: Gabriel Osorio Vargas
- Edited by: Pato Escala Pierart
- Music by: Dënver
- Production company: Punkrobot Studio
- Release date: May 2014 (Chile)
- Running time: 11 minutes
- Country: Chile
- Language: Spanish

Bear Story (Spanish: Historia de un oso) is a 2014 Chilean animated short film, directed by Gabriel Osorio Vargas. The screenplay was co-written with Daniel Castro, and the film was produced by Pato Escala Pierart. The story is inspired by the director's grandfather, Leopoldo Osorio, who was imprisoned for two years after the Chilean coup d'état and then forced into exile for the duration of the dictatorship. The film was a critical success, winning the Oscar for Best Animated Short Film at the 88th Academy Awards.

It is the first Chilean film to win an Academy Award and also the first Latin American animation to win or be nominated for an Oscar.

Bear Story can be viewed fully, under its original Spanish title of Historia de un oso, on Punkrobot Studio's official YouTube channel.

== Plot ==
A bear works on a mechanical diorama that depicts a bear family - himself, a female bear, and a child bear. He carries the figures of the mother and child and looks into an empty child's room before having tea in his kitchen. As he checks the time, the bear puts the two figures into the diorama and cycles out to the village square. He sets up his diorama and announces his business by ringing a bell. A bear child notices him and, after receiving a coin from his father, runs to see the diorama.

The diorama shows the bear's life, starting with himself, his wife, and his child living happily together in an apartment. When a circus arrives, militant-looking figures wielding batons violently subdue and capture animal residents. The bear protects his family but is beaten and taken away. In the circus, he is forced to ride a small bicycle and is kept locked and chained in a cage. As other tricks are added to his act, such as juggling and riding a unicycle, he is required to perform a daredevil jump. Still thinking of his family, the bear performs the jump so well he flies out of the circus tent, escaping captivity and returning home. Weeping at the sight of his wrecked home, the bear's wife and child appear and hug him.

The diorama ends, and the child gives the bear a coin, receiving a pinwheel from him before rushing off to return to their parent. The bear watches them go, glancing at the photograph of his family that he keeps in his pocket watch. He then rings his bell again.

== Legacy ==
Bear Story's success inspired many animators in Chile, such as Fernanda Frick (Here's the Plan), who had worked on the film, and Hugo Covarrubias (Bestia, also Oscar-nominated) to create their own independent animated shorts.

In 2023, Bear Story was uploaded entirely on Punkrobot Studio's official YouTube channel, and under its original Spanish title of Historia de un oso.

== See also ==
- Nahuel and the Magic Book

== Accolades ==
Awards
Award	Date of ceremony	Category	Result	Ref.
88th Academy Awards	28 February 2016	Best Animated Short Film	Won	
24th Arizona International Film Festival	26 April 2015	Best Animated Short	Won	
17th RiverRun International Film Festival	26 April 2015	Best Animated Short	Won	
46th Nashville Film Festival	20 April 2015	Best Animated Short	Won	
24th Florida Film Festival	18 April 2015	Audience Award for Best International Short	Won	
39th Cleveland International Film Festival	29 March 2015	Best Animated Short Award	Won	
16th DC Independent Film Festival	5 March 2015	Best Animation	Won	
