= Nahuel and the Magic Book =

Chilean-Brazilian Animated Film

- Theatrical release poster
- Nahuel y el Libro Mágico
- Directed by: Germán Acuña Delgadillo
- Written by: Juan Pablo Sepúlveda; Germán Acuña
- Produced by: Sebastian Ruz; Germán Acuña; Patricio Escala; Sabrina Bogado; Livia Pagano
- Starring: Consuelo Pizarro; Muriel Benavides; Sebastian Dupon; Vanesa Silva; Sandro Larenas; Jorge Lillo; Sergio Schmied
- Edited by: Marcelo Jara
- Music by: Felicia Morales; Cristobal Carvajal; Germán Acuña
- Animation by: Enrique Ocampo; Rosamary Martínez
- Production companies: Star Distribution; Carburadores; Levante Filmes; Punkrobot Animation Studios; Red Animation Studios; Gecko Animacion; Draftoons Studios; Thumbs Multimedia; 315 Estudios; Stoon; Zentanauta; Cabong Studios; Dragao Studios; Intervalo; Animator; DL assessoria contrabil L+Z; Fratem; LMS Studios
- Distributed by: Walt Disney Studios Motion Pictures
- Release dates: June 15, 2020 (Annecy); January 20, 2022 (Chile); January 25, 2024 (Brazil)
- Running time: 99 minutes
- Countries: Chile; Brazil
- Language: Spanish

Nahuel and the Magic Book (Spanish: Nahuel y el Libro Mágico) is a 2020 Spanish-language animated fantasy-adventure coming-of-age film produced by Carburadores, co-produced by Chilean Punkrobot Studios and Brazilian Levante Films and directed by Germán Acuña Delgadillo. This is the first animated feature that was made in Chile in collaboration with Brazil as well as the first Chilean-Brazilian 2D animated film that entered the Annecy International Animation Film Festival in Annecy, France on June 15, 2020 and in Chile on January 20, 2022.

== Plot ==
In the stormy night in the middle of the sea, as Antonio was desperate to get anyone for help him and Consuelo, his wife get to the nearby hospital, however, this doesn't have enough time to reach there as their child was about to be born, as he give her the locket to his wife, their child is born.

Many years have gone by, Nahuel, now 12, tried to get to the little boat to overcome his fear of the sea, and failed once more. When he tries to go back to the port to meet his father, the two bullies, Calfunao and Rorro, saw him and dragged him along to the little boat that he attempt to ride on, the result backfired, let the dropped from the little ship as he runs. By the time he arrived in the port to see Antonio, he had given out the coins and told to buy some eggs in the market. He brought the eggs from Don Simon and once more, the boy got chased by the two bullies across the market, though the boy escaped at the back of the truck, yet the eggs accidentally dropped.

He rested near the bus stop and a small black cat approached him which then cat grabbed the keys that he dropped on, he followed the cat into the abandoned house, that once he grabbed the keys, he then sees the Levisterio, a dangerous magical book that has been looking over by the wizards for decades, thinking that it's the only way to use it for his fears, before he can finished, the old wizard approached whom see the intruder until the black cat approached the wizard, give the boy chance escapes. And, somebody watches him. The small crows lea by Raiquen, headed to the abandoned island, to inform Kalku, a malevolent crow wizard that once he grabbed the book, he'll be using it to the end of the world.

Back to Nahuel, after his father argued him and told him that his aunt will sent him to Puerto Montt, he use the Levisterio to cast a giant spell, that result a little moth to expand bigger, as then it flew out of the window, that the book turns out to be real. He then turn the page and goes to the bravery spell. A day later, as Antonio headed to work once more and see his son got in, the two got along. Then, storm is formed by Kalku, followed with the coordinated attack by Raiquen and his the crows to get the book, and then the giant wave is formed and crashes into the fishing ship, separating son and father through the sea.

The boy is recovered by Huenchur and Fresia in a hunt, and she told him about the book and his father, who's been taken by Kalku. As Raiquen found the hut, Huenchur told Fresia that she has to get Nahuel to get to that place to rescue his father while Huenchur stayed to defend the two as he uses smoke to dust out the hunt and let the two escape. The two woman fought as Raiquen left and turns back to the crow. In the night, Nahuel and Fresia set the place to rest, while Nahuel accidentally uses the two stones to speak, the Nivulu rose and attack the two children, before the creature attack Nahuel, a Ruende, giant wolf bites the creature and let it be retreat. Now the three head to rescue his father while also confronting and overcoming his deepest fears.

== Cast ==
- Consuelo Pizarro as Nahuel, the curious, introverted, and shy 12-year-old who is bullied by Calfunao and Rorro. Nahuel is deeply afraid of the sea, and he steals the Levisterio, a magical book, to confront and overcome his fears. However, his actions lead to his father being kidnapped by Kalku, and Nahuel must embark on a quest to rescue his father and conquer his own fears.
- Muriel Benavides as Fresia, a young Mapuchean machi who shelters and helps Nahuel to find his father and possibly his love interest.
- Marcelo Liapiz as Kalku, a sorcerer who controls all crows and kidnapped Nahuel's father.
- Jorge Lillo as Antonio, Nahuel's dad who's a fisherman and suffered emotionally after his wife's died at the beginning of the film. He was kidnapped by Kalku after a storm destroy their ship.
  - Chon Chon, the goblin-like dealer from the Tavern who makes a deal with Nahuel after Chon Chon gives him a riddle.
  - Guardián, an old sorcerer who lives in the abandoned house.
  - Rorro, Nahuel's other bully and the friend of Calfunao.
  - and Don Simón, the man who buys the egg at the market.
- Sandro Larenas as Elzaino, the tavern owner.
- Sebastián Dupont Gallardo as Ruende, a talking wolf who wanted revenge on Kalku. He also voiced:
  - Calfunao, Nahuel's bully.
- Vanesa Silva as Consuelo, Nahuel's late mom and the wife of Elzaino who dies at the beginning of the film, and saves Nahuel from drowning.
  - Raiquen, Ruende's wife who was cursed by Kalku
  - Huenchur, one of the characters that save Nahuel
  - Sra Hilda, the old woman at the marketplace.
- Sergio Schmied as Trauco, an old creature who needs Nahuel's help to find Kalku.

== Production ==
The film production started in 2015 with the help of the Brazilian animation studio Levante Filmes and, later on, other Chilean animation studios like Punkrobot Studio (which created and produced the Oscar award-winning short film Bear Story), Red Animation Studios, Dragao Animation Studios, LMS Animation Studios and Draftoons Studios

The CEOs of Punkrobot and Levante Films, Patricio Escala and Sabrina Bogado, helped Acuña and his team to make the film quickly due to their funds.

The co-founder of Carburadores and the executive director from Levante Films, Sebastian Ruz and Livia Pagano, were the producers of the film, who were in charge of hiring animators, sound producers, editors, financiers, and sales agents.

The writer of the script in the film were Germán Acuña and Juan Pablo Sepúlveda which they wrote together after his research back in 2012, when he was on the island of Chiloé.

The music composers were Acuña, Felicia Morales, and Christopher Carvajal and the sound designers were Marcelo Vidal and Leonardo Guimaraes. They used the software device called Alcateia Digital to create sounds for the scenes. Marcelo Jara was the editor of the film.

The animation director was Enrique Ocampo and the general animation supervisor was Rosamari Martínez, that helped the crew of animators across the studios. The art directors of the film were Director Acuña and Coni Adonis, The background artists were Acuña, Coni Adonis, Javier Navarro, Francisco Vasquez, Luna Vargas and Luisa Adonis. Cristobal Macaya designed the characters.

The animators of the movie were from the other animation studios from Chile, Brazil and Peru like Punkrobot, Levante, Red, Dragao, LMS, Draftoons and many freelance animators all over Latin America.

== Release ==
Nahuel and the Magic Book had its first premiere virtually in Annecy International Animation Film Festival from June 15 to June 30, 2020, in Annecy, France, followed by other festivals like the SCHLINGEL International Film Festival in Chemnitz, Germany on October 10–17, 2020, the Chilemonos Festival in Santiago, Chile on October 5–24, 2020, American Film Market in Santa Monica, California, USA on November 9–12, 2020, and Tte Tokyo Anime Award Festival, which would premiere this film in Tokyo, Japan on March 12–15, 2021, followed by the North American release in the New York International Children's Film Festival in New York City on March 6, the Toronto Animation Arts Festival International in Toronto on March 25, the Buenos Aires International Independent Film Festival in Buenos Aires, Argentina on March 28, the Seattle International Film Festival in Seattle, Oregon, USA on April 8, the Stockholm Film Festival in Stockholm, Sweden on April 19, the Quirino Awards in La Laguna, Spain on May 27–29, 2021, the Marché du Film in Cannes, France from July 6–15, 2021, the Transylvania International Film Festival in Cluj-Napoca, Transylvania Romania on July 25–26, Cinemagic in Dublin, Ireland from July 30-August 12, 2021, the Zlin Film Festival in Zlin, Czech Republic on September 9–15, 2021, the Viborg Animation Festival in Viborg, Denmark on September 27, 2021 – October 3, 2021, the Cinemarteket on October 7 to 10, 2021 on Denmark, the Latin America Film Festival in Los Angeles on October 8–10, 2021, the Animation Is Film Festival on October 23 in Los Angeles, the Rolan International Film Festival in Rolan, Armenia on November 1–5, 2021 and the Film Frasnor in Oslo, Norway on November 11–21, 2021.

In June, "Nahuel" sold to HBO in Eastern Europe, according to Variety.

The film's worldwide release date was expected to be in late 2021 and it would premiere on Chile, Brazil, Peru, Argentina, Colombia, and the United States.

On December 1, El Mercurio reported the official release date on the film in Chile was January 20, 2022 and months later, on September 23, Disney Plus Latin America acquired the rights to distribute the film all across Latin America, and in Brazil on January 23, 2024

== Accolades ==
Award	Date	Category	Name	Result
Annecy International Animation Festival	June 15, 2020	Feature Film	Nahuel and the Magic Book	Nominated
Chilemonos International Animation Film Festival	October 4, 2020	Largometrajes Latino Americanos	Nahuel y el Libro Mágico	Won
SCHLINGEL International Film Festival	October 10, 2020	Full-Length Film	Nahuel and the Magic Book	Nominated
New York International Children's Film Festival	March 6, 2021	Opening Spotlight	Nahuel and the Magic Book	Nominated
Tokyo Anime Award Festival	March 12, 2021	Award of Excellence	Nahuel and the Magic Book	Won
Toronto Animation Arts Festival International	March 25, 2021	Full-Length Film	Nahuel and the Magic Book	Nominated
Buenos Aires International Independent Film Festival	March 28, 2021	Little BAFCI	Nahuel y el Libro Mágico	Nominated
Seattle International Film Festival	April 8, 2021	Full Length Film	Nahuel and the Magic Book	Nominated
Stockholm Film Festival Junior	April 19, 2021	Full-Length Film	Nahuel and the Magic Book/Nahuel och den Magiska Boken	Nominated
Quirino Awards	May 29, 2021	Nahuel y el Libro Mágico	Best Ibero-American Animation Feature Film	Nominated
Transylvania International Film Festival	July 25, 2021	Best Feature	Nahuel si Cartea Magica	Nominated
Cinemagic Dublin	July 30, 2021	Full-Length Film	Nahuel and the Magic Book	Nominated
Zlin Film Festival	September 9, 2021	Full-Length Film	Nahuel a Kouzelná Kniha	Nominated
Viborg Animation Festival	September 27, 2021	Best Feature	Nahuel og den Magiske Bog/Nahuel and the Magic Book	Nominated
Buster Film Festival, Copenhagen	September 27, 2021	Full Length Film	Nahuel og den Magiske Bog	Nominated
Cinemateket	October 7, 2021	Full-Length Film	Nahuel and the Magic Book	Nominated
Latin America Film Festival	October 8, 2021	Full-Length Film	Nahuel y el Libro Mágico/Nahuel and the Magic Book	Nominated
Cine Magnifico	October 16, 2021	Full-Length Film	Nahuel y el Libro Mágico	Nominated
Animation Is Film	October 23, 2021	Full-Length Film	Nahuel and the Magic Book	Nominated
LatinAmerika i Fokus	October 31, 2021	Full-Length Film	Nahuel og den Magiske Boka/Nahuel y el Libro Mágico	Nominated
Rolan International Film Festival	November 1, 2021	Best Long Animated Film	Նահուելը և կախարդական գիրքը/Nahuel and the Magic Book	Nominated
Film Frasnor	November 11, 2021	Full-Length Film	Nahuel og den Magiske Boka/Nahuel and the Magic Book	Nominated

== See also ==
- Bear Story
