= Decorado =

- Film poster
- Directed by: Alberto Vázquez
- Screenplay by: Alberto Vázquez; F. Xavier Manuel Ruiz
- Based on: Decorado by Alberto Vázquez
- Produced by: Chelo Loureiro; Iván Miñambres
- Edited by: Estanis Bañuelos
- Music by: Joseba Beristain
- Production companies: Abano Producións; Uniko Estudio Creativo; Glow Animation; Sardinha Em Lata; María y Arnold AIE
- Distributed by: Barton Films (Spain)
- Release dates: 21 September 2025 (Fantastic Fest); 24 October 2025 (Spain)
- Running time: 95 minutes
- Countries: Spain; Portugal
- Language: Spanish
- Box office: $40,052

Decorado is a 2025 animated dramedy film directed by Alberto Vázquez from a screenplay he co-wrote with F. Xavier Manuel Ruiz. The plot follows Arnold, a mouse in an existential crisis, who suspects his entire world is a theater set. After his friend dies from a tragic accident, Arnold begins to search for what is more authentic in his life.

Based on the animated short film of the same name by the director himself, the film is a joint Spanish-Portuguese co-production.

== Plot ==
The curtains open on the City of Anywhere, which is dominated by the ALMA corporation. Arnold Mouse has not had a job in years, and he regularly takes prescription drugs made by ALMA. His wife, Maria, struggles to support them both as a cartoonist. The bank run by ALMA has sent them a warning that the couple will be evicted in two months if they don't pay their debt. Above all, Arnold has started to fear that everything around him is fake, as if it were theatrical scenery instead. (a decorado)

Arnold visits his best friends Ramiro Rat and Crazy Chicken at their home. Ramiro claims he can find an escape from Anywhere through the nearby forest. Ramiro takes his two friends to the forest, where they encounter not only a homeless colony, but also a devil who plays a psalterion, and a reverse mermaid. But then a giant owl attacks the trio, then killing Ramiro. At Ramiro's funeral, police dogs arrest Crazy for starting wildfires that they themselves have been setting.

Mr. Gregory, the deputy director of ALMA, invites Maria to lunch and offers to talk to the bank about forgiving the Mice's debt, and offers her a job at ALMA's newspaper. But he pressures Maria to leave Arnold for him. The stress Maria feels attracts Depression the Fairy to her. Depression makes Maria remember their hopeful past, when both Mice had jobs at ALMA's factory until they got fired for painting anti-ALMA graffiti. The fairy also makes Maria seriously doubt her talent and badmouths Arnold. Maria eventually grows so angry with Depression that she crushes her with a fly swatter. An alive but injured Depression leaves, vowing that her sisters Anguish and Anxiety will come to haunt Maria.

One day, Arnold runs into Roni Duck. Roni was his favorite star of ALMA-made cartoons, but he now appears to be a drug addict living in the streets. However, days later, Arnold finds Roni Duck working as a realtor, trying to sell Ramiro's house. And days after that, Arnold watches a TV documentary that claims that Roni is playing a drug addict in his next movie. These contradictions lead Arnold to angrily question the reality he lives in. He flushes his prescription drugs away and vows to find Ramiro's escape.

Arnold breaks into Ramiro's home and finds a map Ramiro drew that appears to show the escape path. After braving the homeless colony, filled with former ALMA employees addicted to ALMA's drugs, Arnold follows the path to some high mountains. A hermit with a herd of wild goats that lives in the mountains explains that they are not passable, and only death exists on their other side. A dejected Arnold later runs into Mr. Mushroom, a salesman for ALMA. Mr. Mushroom offers to help by stealing the devil's harp and using it to bring Ramiro back as a ghost. Ghost Ramiro remembers seeing another path just beyond the giant owl's nest right before he died. But then ALMA sends the police dogs after Ghost Ramiro. ALMA demotes Mr. Mushroom to work in the sewers because he tried to pass off the harp as an ALMA product. There, Mr. Mushroom discovers that Arnold is not taking his drugs.

Maria is so furious that Arnold is harboring Ghost Ramiro in their attic that she leaves Arnold for Gregory. A devastated Arnold lets the house fall apart. ALMA sends a spy disguised as Ghost Ramiro to infiltrate Arnold's home. Arnold defeats the spy and uses his disguise to sneak into ALMA headquarters. There he discovers that his neighbors have been working with ALMA to keep watch on Arnold. Arnold flees into the forest, ending up at a high cliff that overlooks the city. Concluding that death is the only way to escape, Arnold is about to jump off the cliff when Maria appears. Maria has abandoned Gregory to rush right over to save Arnold, and she vows to stand by his side. The couple then resolve to put their lives back together.

Weeks pass, and the Mice have seemingly rebuilt their lives by following ALMA's rules. Maria now has a steady job at ALMA's newspaper. Arnold's friend Crazy Chicken has been exonerated, and Arnold himself has his old job back at the ALMA factory. In fact, Arnold has performed so well that Gregory awards him the honor of giving a speech at the grand opening of ALMA's new housing development. But instead of doing the speech, Arnold follows a plan to escape Anywhere with the help of Maria, Mr. Mushroom, and Ghost Ramiro. When Arnold fails to show up for the speech, the entire city turns against the Mice. But Crazy Chicken starts a fire to hold them at bay.

The group reaches the giant owl's nest. There they find Gregory holding the owl on a chain. Arnold asserts that love is the only truly real thing and that his friends stand together through love. The giant owl acknowledges Arnold's point and turns on Gregory, allowing for the group to escape. The group finds what first appears to be a beautiful seaside landscape. But the buildings and plants all turn out to be props, and the sounds are all from machines. Maria then says that she finally believes Arnold was right in that they were all living in a decorado. The rest of the cast appear over the horizon as the landscape reveals itself to be a set of curtains opening up to a blank, empty void, traumatizing the couple; Roni Duck explains that while it may be a decorado, it's "our decorado". Everyone then joins hands and starts chanting "DECORADO!". A frightened Arnold and Maria join hands with the rest, and the curtains close.

== Production ==
At the 2023 Valencia-based Weird Market, Alberto Vázquez pitched Decorado, then reportedly in pre-production, as "an existentialist fable about the meaning of life and the crises we go through". He mentioned The Truman Show, the classical Mickey Mouse cartoons and Ingmar Bergman's Scenes from a Marriage as references. The film is a Spanish-Portuguese co-production by Abano Producións along with UniKo Estudio Creativo, Glow Animation, Sardinha Em Lata, and María y Arnold AIE.

José Luis Ágreda worked as art director and Pamela Poltronieri as animation director.

== Release ==
Decorado had its world premiere at the 20th Fantastic Fest on 21 September 2025. It screened at the 58th Sitges Film Festival in October 2025 for its Spanish premiere. Its festival run also included selections for screenings in the competitive slate of the Ottawa International Animation Film Festival, the 'Cult' strand of the 2025 BFI London Film Festival, and in the competitive lineup of the 8th Animation Is Film Festival (for its West Coast premiere). It was released theatrically in Spain on 24 October 2025 by Barton Films. It was also programmed in the main competition lineup of the 2026 Annecy International Animation Film Festival.

GKIDS picked up North American distribution rights to the film, scheduled a theatrical release with both English-language subtitles and dubbing on 15 May 2026.

== Reception ==
On the review aggregator website Rotten Tomatoes, 89% of 28 critics' reviews are positive, with an average rating of 7.5/10. Metacritic, which uses a weighted average, assigned the film a score of 70 out of 100, based on 5 critics, indicating "generally favorable" reviews.

Carlos Aguilar of Variety claimed that there's little chance another film can dethrone Decorado as "the most mind-bending" animated feature released in 2026.

Juan Barquin of RogerEbert.com gave the film 3 out of 4 stars, determining Vázquez's work in the film to be "more cohesive than ever, feeling like a meticulously crafted world, albeit chaotic and overflowing with unique characters".

== Accolades ==
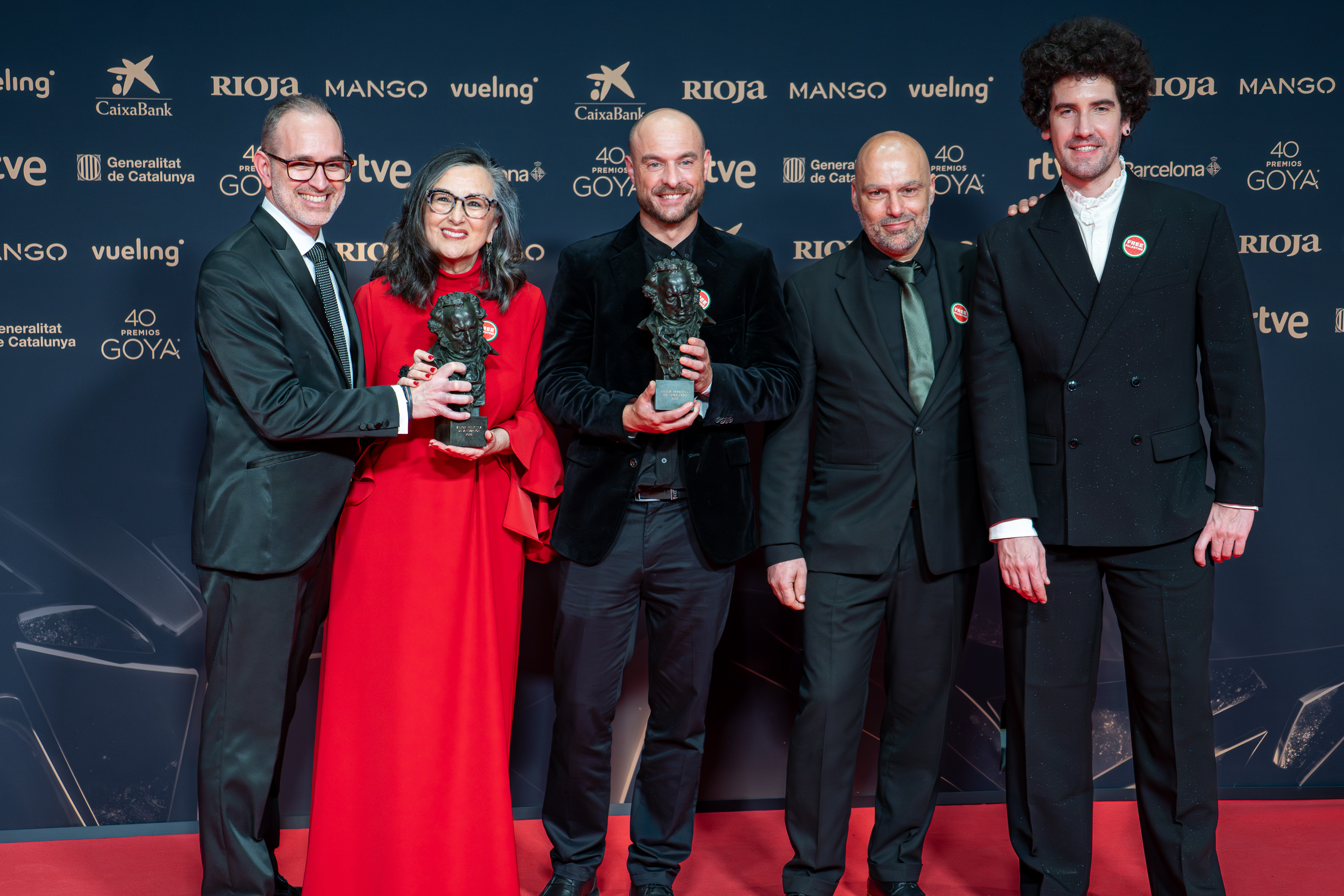
Decorado team attending the 40th Goya Awards in 2026

Award	Date of ceremony	Category	Recipient(s)	Result	Ref.
Forqué Awards	13 December 2025	Best Animation Film	Decorado	Won	
Feroz Awards	24 January 2026	Best Comedy Film	Decorado	Nominated	
CEC Medals	23 February 2026	Best Animation Film	Decorado	Won	
Goya Awards	28 February 2026	Best Animated Film	Decorado	Won	
Platino Awards	9 May 2026	Best Animated Film	Decorado	Nominated	

== See also ==
- List of Spanish films of 2025
