= Sara Varon =

American graphic novelist and illustrator

- Born: Illinois, U.S.
- Areas: Writer, Artist
- Notable works: Sweaterweather; Robot Dreams; Bake Sale; Odd Duck; New Shoes; Hold Hands

Sara Varon is an American graphic novelist, writer, and illustrator best known for her work in children's literature. Her best known work is the comic Robot Dreams which was later adapted into an animated film of the same name directed by Pablo Berger.

== Early life ==
Varon grew up in the Illinois suburbs. She got her Bachelor of Fine Arts from the Art Institute of Chicago and her MFA degree from the School of Visual Arts in New York City in 2002. Varon is on the faculty of the School of Visual Arts.

== Career ==
Varon's characters are entirely non-human — she claims to be bad at drawing people — except in her book My Pencil and Me where she draws herself. Her characters often form unlikely friendships — cats and chickens, cupcakes and eggplants — which combine to form what the New York Times calls "endearing, uncommon narratives."

Varon created a series of alebrijes of some of her cartoon characters in collaboration with a Oaxacan artist. She has also made traditional-style Turkish carpets with images of her characters.

== Personal life ==
As of October 2023, Varon lives in Chicago.

== Honors and awards ==
On the strength of Sweaterweather (Alternative Comics, 2003), Varon was a 2004 Harvey Award nominee for Best New Talent.

Varon's book Robot Dreams (2007) landed on many 2007 and 2008 "best-of" lists, including:

- Oprah's Book Club
- YALSA Great Graphic Novels
- NYPL Book for the Teen Age
- NYPL Book for Reading and Sharing
- Bank Street Book of Outstanding Merit
- NCTE Notable Children's Book in the English Language Arts
- American Library Association Notable Children's Book
- Publishers Weekly 150 Best Books of the Year
- Kirkus Reviews Best Children's Books of 2007
- Bulletin of the Center for Children's Books Blue Ribbon title

Bake Sale (2011) was named a YALSA Great Graphic Novel for 2012 and selected by the School Library Journal as one of the Top 10 Graphic Novels of 2011. In addition, it was a Junior Library Guild Fall 2011 Selection.

Varon was a recipient of the Maurice Sendak Fellowship in 2013.

Her and Cecil Castellucci's book Odd Duck (2013) was a Eisner Award nominee. In addition, it was named by School Library Journal as one of the Top 10 Graphic Novels of 2013, and Kirkus Reviews named it one of the Best Children's Books of 2013. Odd Duck was a Spring 2013 Selection of the Junior Library Guild. Translated into French as Des canards trop bizarres, it won the 2015 Livrentête Prize in France.

Varon's book New Shoes (2018) was selected as one of the books features in the Eric Carle Museum of Picture Book Art's exhibit Out of the Box in 2019.

Her book Hold Hands (2019) was selected as a New York Times Book Review Notable Children's Book of the Year in 2019.

== Bibliography ==
- Sweaterweather (Alternative Comics, 2003) ISBN 1-891867-49-0
- The Present (Walker Art Center, 2005)
- Chicken and Cat (Scholastic, 2006) ISBN 0439634067
- Robot Dreams (First Second, 2007) ISBN 1596431083
- Chicken and Cat Clean Up (Scholastic, 2009) ISBN 0439634083
- Bake Sale (First Second, 2011) ISBN 1596437405
- (with Cecil Castellucci) Odd Duck (Macmillan, 2013) ISBN 1596435577
- (with Aaron Reynolds) President Squid (Chronicle Books, 2016) ISBN 1452136475
- Sweaterweather & Other Short Stories (Macmillan, 2016) ISBN 1626721181
- New Shoes (First Second, 2018) ISBN 1596439203
- Hold Hands (Macmillan, 2019) ISBN 9781250266354
- My Pencil and Me (First Second, 2020) ISBN 1596435895
- (with Cate Berry) Thank You, Teacher (HarperCollins, 2023) ISBN 0062491571
- Detective Sweet Pea: The Case of the Golden Bone (First Second, 2024) ISBN 978-1250348401
