= Outstanding Animated Series =

Outstanding Animated Series may refer to the following award categories:

Annie Awards

- Annie Award for Best Animated Television Production
- Annie Award for Best Animated Television Production for Children
- Annie Award for Best Animated Television Production for Preschool
- Annie Award for Best General Audience Animated Television Production

Emmy Awards

- Children's and Family Emmy Award for Outstanding Animated Series
- Daytime Emmy Award for Outstanding Children's Animated Program, awarded from 1985 to 2021
- Daytime Emmy Award for Outstanding Pre-School Children's Animated Program, awarded from 2013 to 2021
- Primetime Emmy Award for Outstanding Animated Program

Other awards

- Saturn Award for Best Animated Series on Television
- Writers Guild of America Award for Television: Animation

== See also ==
- List of animation awards
