= A Costume for Nicholas =

2020 animated film

- Theatrical release poster
- Directed by: Eduardo Rivero
- Screenplay by: Miguel Ángel Uriegas
- Based on: Pablo and the Trunk by Jaime Mijares
- Produced by: Jaime Romandía Creel; Miguel Ángel Uriegas; Genaro López Rebollo; Eduardo Jiménez Ahuactzin
- Edited by: Roberto Almeida Junquera
- Music by: Manuel Andrés Vázquez Terry
- Production company: Fotosíntesis Media
- Release date: 3 September 2020
- Running time: 80 minutes
- Country: Mexico
- Language: Spanish

A Costume for Nicholas (Spanish: Un disfraz para Nicolás) is a 2020 Mexican animated fantasy adventure film directed by Eduardo Rivero (in his directorial debut) from a screenplay by Miguel Ángel Uriegas. Produced by Uriegas, Jaime Romandía Creel, Genaro López Rebollo, and Eduardo Jiménez Ahuactzin, the film was produced by the studio Fotosíntesis Media. After being delayed several times due to the COVID-19 pandemic, A Costume for Nicholas was released on September 3, 2020.

== Premise ==
Nicholas, a 10-year-old boy with Down syndrome, is sent to live with his grandparents and cousin David after the death of his mother. Nicholas recalls how his mother would make him a new costume each year, with a story based on each of these costumes. One night, David struggles with a nightmare, and Nicholas thinks he sees a monster lurking underneath their bunkbed. While trying to escape the monster, Nicholas is pulled into a chest that contains all the costumes his mother made for him. Inside the chest, Nicholas is transported into a magical realm filled with all the stories his mother told him. In this world, Nicholas must help his grandmother Ana save her sister Sophie, who has been taken by an evil wizard.

== Production ==
A Costume for Nicholas was loosely inspired by the book Pablo and the Trunk (Pablo y el baúl) by Jaime Mijares, a friend of screenwriter and producer Miguel Ángel Uriegas. While researching for the film, Rivero and Uriegas met a therapist for the Special Olympics Mexico—a sports program for children with intellectual disabilities—who took them to meet the boys with whom she works, among these Fran Fernández. The crew opted to cast Fernández, who also has Down syndrome, to voice protagonist Nicholas. According to director Eduardo Rivero, they were initially unsure if Fernández could achieve the intentions they were looking for the character. Rivero stated: "At first it was difficult for him to say his lines, but over time he gained confidence and said his dialogue with perfect clarity and vision."

== Release ==
A Costume for Nicholas was originally set to have its world premiere at the Guadalajara International Film Festival on March 22, 2020 before a theatrical release on May 8; however, the festival had to be delayed and cinemas closed due to the COVID-19 pandemic. It was finally released on September 3, 2020.

=== Accolades ===
At the 8th Platino Awards held on October 3, 2021, A Costume for Nicholas was nominated for Best Animated Film but lost to Turu, the Wacky Hen.

Nevertheless, in the 63º Ariel Award, the movie won for Best Animated Feature Film, and in the 4th Quirino Awards ceremony too, both in 2021.
