= Pato Escala Pierart =

Chilean animator and film producer

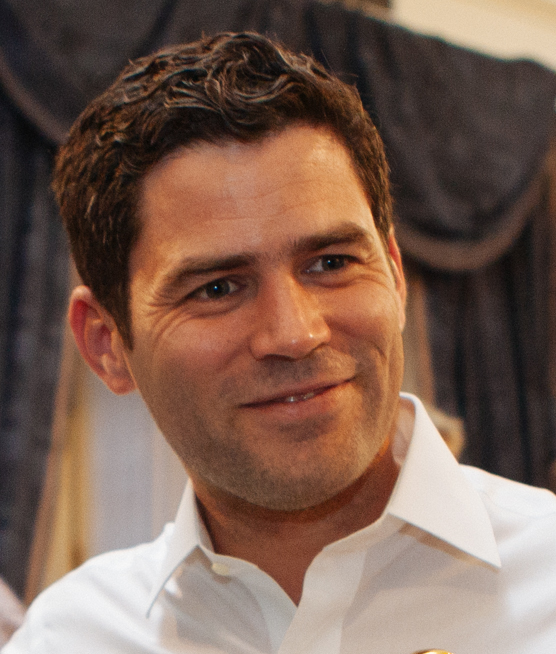
- Escala in 2016
- Born: Patricio "Pato" Escala Pierart; 28 May 1982 (age 44); Talcahuano, Chile
- Occupations: Film producer; Film editor; Animator
- Years active: 2014–present

Patricio "Pato" Ignacio Escala Pierart is a Chilean animator and film producer. He is best known for producing, editing and animating the short animated film Bear Story (2015), which won for Best Animated Short Film at the 88th Academy Awards; the first Chilean film to do so, and Nahuel and the Magic Book (2020). He shared the win with director Gabriel Osorio Vargas. The film also entered various film festivals worldwide, receiving numerous awards and nominations.

== Life and career ==
=== Early life ===
His father, who was a military under Pinochet's ruling, died when Escala was 17. Escala used to listen to revolutionary rock bands such as Los Miserables. He studied to become a veterinarian for two years, and then studied communications.

=== Career ===
Escala founded his studio Punkrobot with his girlfriend, his sister and her boyfriend.

In August 2017, he launched the production of the animated series' pilot Guitar & Drum.

== Other roles ==
- President of Animachi (Chile's national animation lobby)
