= Sultana's Dream (film) =

- Theatrical release poster
- Spanish: El sueño de la sultana
- Directed by: Isabel Herguera
- Screenplay by: Isabel Herguera; Gianmarco Serra
- Based on: Sultana's Dream by Rokeya Hossain
- Produced by: Mariano Baratech; Deepti Chawla; Sarah Dhanens; Fabian Driehorst; Diego Herguera Acosta; Isabel Herguera; Chelo Loureiro; Iván Miñambres
- Production company: Sultana Films; Gatoverde Producciones; Abano Producións; Uniko Estudio Creativo; Fabian & Fred
- Distributed by: Filmin
- Release dates: 24 September 2023 (San Sebastián); 17 November 2023 (Spain)
- Running time: 86 minutes
- Countries: Spain; Germany
- Languages: Basque; Bengali; English; Hindi; Italian; Spanish

Sultana's Dream (Spanish: El sueño de la sultana) is a 2023 animated drama film directed by Isabel Herguera from a screenplay she co-wrote with Gianmarco Serra, based in part on the 1905 short story of the same name by Rokeya Hossain.

== Premise ==
Inés, a Spanish artist living in Bangladesh, travels throughout the country learning about the life of author Rokeya Hossain and the utopian Ladyland she described in her 1905 short story Sultana's Dream.

== Cast ==
- Mary Beard
- Miren Arrieta
- Mireia Gabilondo
- Maurizio Faraoni
- Manu Khurana
- Arunima Bhattacharya
- Ranjitha Rajeevan
- Paul B. Preciado

== Production ==
In 2012, Herguera launched a crowdfunded workshop series in India focused on Sultana's Dream by Rokeya Hossain. The director later received a screenwriting grant from the Basque government to develop a film based on Hossain's work.

Each of the film's three parts was created using a different animation technique. Portions of the narrative centered on Inés are animated with ink and watercolor, shadow puppets tell the story of Rokeya Hossain, and the fictional Ladyland is animated using mendhi.

== Release ==
Sultana's Dream screened as a work-in-progress at the 2023 Annecy International Animation Film Festival. The completed film premiered on 24 September 2023 at the San Sebastián International Film Festival, where it was awarded the Basque Film Award and the award for the Best Basque Screenplay. The film was released nationwide in Spain on 17 November.

For home video, Cartuna released the film on Blu-ray in 2025, including a number of Herguera's short films as bonus features. The film released on 16 January 2026 in theaters of Bangladesh.

== Reception ==
=== Box office ===
Sultana's Dream grossed $7,867 during the film's theatrical release in Spain.

=== Accolades ===
Name of the Award	Ceremony date	Category	Recipient(s)	Result
AWARDS
San Sebastián International Film Festival	30 September 2023	Basque Film Award	Sultana's Dream	Won
San Sebastián International Film Festival	30 September 2023	Best Basque Screenplay	Isabel Herguera, Gianmarco Serra	Won
Filmfest Hamburg	7 October 2023	Hamburg Producers Award for European Cinema Co-Productions	Fabian Driehorst	Won
Quirino Awards	May 2024	Best Visual Development	Isabel Herguera, Rocío Álvarez, Elena Jariego Antón, Duna Tàrrega	Won
Annecy International Animation Film Festival	15 June 2024	Contrechamp Grand Prix	Sultana's Dream	Won
Animafest Zagreb	8 June 2024	Grand Competition Feature Film	Sultana's Dream	Won
Festival international du film d'animation de Bruxelles	Feb-Mar 2024	Award For Best Animated Feature	Sultana's Dream	Won
Seoul Indie-AniFest	Oct 2024	Mirinae Grand Prix	Sultana's Dream	Won
Leeds International Film Festival (LIFF)	Nov 2024	Special Mention	Sultana's Dream	Won
Celtic Media Festival	Abr 2024	Best Animation	Sultana's Dream	Won
Cartoons on the Bay	Abr 2024	Best Screenplay & Special prize	Isabel Herguera, Gianmarco Serra	Won
World Festival of animated film Varna	Oct 2024	Best Feature Film	Sultana's Dream	Won
Animest International Animation Film Festival	Oct 2024	Special Mention	Sultana's Dream	Won
Animadeba, Festival internacional de animación	Sep 2024	EITB Award	Sultana's Dream	Won
International Animation Film and Comics Art Festival of Yerevan	Oct 2024	Jury Special Mention	Sultana's Dream	Won
Wench Film Festival	Nov 2024	Special Mention	Sultana's Dream	Won
Nominations
San Sebastián International Film Festival	30 September 2023	Golden Shell	Sultana's Dream	Nominated
European Film Awards	7 December 2024	European Animated Feature Film	Sultana's Dream	Nominated
Forqué Awards	16 December 2023	Best Animated Film	Sultana's Dream	Nominated
Feroz Awards	26 January 2024	'Arrebato' Special Award (Fiction)	Sultana's Dream	Nominated
Goya Awards	10 February 2024	Best Animated Film	Sultana's Dream	Nominated
Platino Awards	20 April 2024	Best Animated Film	Sultana's Dream	Nominated
Quirino Awards	11 May 2024	European Director of the year	Isabel Herguera	Nominated
Deutscher Menschenrechtspreis	11 November 2024	Human Rights Award	Sultana's Dream	Nominated
