= Birdboy: The Forgotten Children =

- Theatrical release poster
- Directed by: Alberto Vázquez; Pedro Rivero
- Written by: Alberto Vázquez; Pedro Rivero
- Based on: Psiconautas by Alberto Vázquez
- Produced by: Farruco Castromán; Carlos Júarez; Luis Tosar
- Cinematography: Jose Domingo; Alberto Vázquez
- Edited by: Iván Miñambres
- Music by: Aránzazu Calleja; Victor García; Junna
- Production companies: ZircoZine; Uniko; Basque Films; Abrakam Estudio; La Competencia Producciones
- Distributed by: Netflix
- Release date: September 24, 2015 (San Sebastian Film Festival)
- Running time: 76 minutes
- Country: Spain
- Language: Spanish
- Budget: €1 million
- Box office: $54,845

Birdboy: The Forgotten Children (Spanish: Psiconautas, los niños olvidados; also known as Psychonauts, the Forgotten Children) is a 2015 Spanish adult animated dystopian coming-of-age psychological horror drama film written and directed by Alberto Vázquez and Pedro Rivero, based on the comic Psiconautas by Vázquez. It is the follow-up to the pair's short film Birdboy, following the titular character, a shy outcast in a post-apocalyptic society, and Dinky, a 14-year-old mouse girl, fleeing her desolate island home.

== Plot ==
An island home of a cast of talking animals was once a fishing community with a pristine environment. Birdman, the father of Birdboy, tended the lighthouse that guided the fishing boats. Then a factory was built and many islanders went to work there. But one day, the factory exploded, devastating much of the island and killing all the fish. The destroyed part of the island became a landfill. After the explosion, Birdman began flying around the island mysteriously, carrying a satchel. The police came to believe that he was trafficking drugs, and they eventually shot him dead, but his satchel actually contained strange glowing golden acorns.

The explosion leaves a large crow-like demon trapped inside Birdboy, leading him to live alone. Birdboy controls the demon by using drugs that he buys from Zachariah, a piglet who owns a fishing boat and a parrot, and "happy pills" that a mouse named Dinky steals from her parents. The young mouse in fact becomes very close friends with Birdboy, but he pushes her away because of the demon inside him. The police hunt after Birdboy, thinking that he might be pushing drugs as well, and shoot him in many instances. But each time he's shot, Birdboy retreats to a secret grotto. Thriving with life, the grotto contains a giant tree surrounded by clean water that still has fish. Birdboy has filled the tree with birds; when they die, their souls take the form of bright yellow bugs that can heal Birdboy's wounds. The bugs then retreat to the tree, causing it to grow the golden acorns.

Dinky lives with her mother and stepfather, Christian fundamentalists that routinely excoriate her for her misbehavior. One day, she decides to finally go through with a plan to escape the island. She and her friends Sandra the rabbit and Little Fox have been saving coins to pay for a trip to the city, where they heard Little White Mouse's older brother went and prospered. To get the last amount of money they need, they decide to rob Zachariah's house. Zachariah has also been saving money to escape, but stays to care for his drug addicted mother. Her addiction takes the form of a vicious spider demon that grows to gigantic size whenever Zachariah injects the drugs. The spider catches the children stealing Zachariah's piggy bank, but the kids get away with the bank after a fight that leaves the spider weakened. Finally fed up with the spider, Zachariah crushes it, even though he knows killing the spider will kill his mother. But his mother actually thanks Zachariah for freeing her; trying to comfort her tearful son with her last words.

Dinky, Sandra and Little Fox make their way to the landfill, where they find Little White Mouse's brother still there, scavenging copper for money. The brother leads them to the contraband dealer Uncle Klauss. The kids hope to get a boat on which to leave the island, but they can only afford a large inflatable pool toy duck. Continuing through the landfill, the kids get ambushed by a tribe of scavenger rats known as the Forgotten Children. Zachariah's parrot sees the capture, and flies to Birdboy to warn him that the Forgotten Children plan to execute the kids. Filled with rage, Birdboy allows the demon to take over, turning him into gigantic, fire breathing raptor. In this form, Birdboy decimates the Forgotten Children as a ferocious scuffle and destroys their settlement.

Once freed, Dinky searches for Birdboy and finds her scared friend reverted to his normal form. Dinky pleads with Birdboy to come with them, and finally tells him that she loves him. Overjoyed, Birdboy agrees to guide the kids on the inflatable duck from the air. But a storm capsizes the toy duck, and then the police spot Birdboy and shoot him one last time. Zachariah uses his fishing boat to rescue the kids, but he then returns them to their homes. Later on, Zachariah tries to fish again, only to salvage a dying Birdboy from the ocean's bottom. Birdboy's own glowing bug emerges from his dying breath. The bug gathers many other bugs, and they fly to Dinky's room. The bugs lead her to Birdboy's grotto, where she finds the golden acorns that may someday revive the island.

== Cast ==
Character	Spanish	English
Dinky	Andrea Alzuri	Lauren Weintraub
Sandra	Eba Ojanguren	Sofia Bryant
Little Fox	Josu Cubero	Dean Flanagan
Birdman	Félix Arkarazo	Jake Paque
False Dad	Jorge Carrero	Marc Thompson
Dinky's Mother	Nuria Marín	Janis Carroll
Mr. Reloggio	Josu Varela	Erik Scott Kimerer
Zacharias	Jon Goiri	Yuri Lowenthal
Zacharias's Mother	Nuria Marín	Cindy Robinson
Spider	Maribel Legarreta	Cindy Robinson
Parrot	Iker Díaz	Wayne Grayson
Piggy Bank	Juan Carlos Loriz	Joseph Whims
Sergeant	Kepa Cueto	Scott Williams
Young Police	Josu Díaz	Kyle McCarley
Little Brother	Markel Kerejeta	Hudson Loverro

== Release ==
The animation film distribution company GKIDS acquired the North American rights. GKIDS released a theatrical release of the film in its original Spanish and a dubbed English-language version in January 2018. The film was released onto DVD and Blu-ray on March 21, 2018.

== Reception ==
On Rotten Tomatoes, the film has a 94% rating based on 33 reviews with an average rating of 7.50/10. The site's critical consensus is "Birdboy's nihilistic coming-of-age narrative captures innocence lost through surreal, striking animation and caustically optimistic storytelling". The film also holds a 76 rating on Metacritic.

Dennis Harvey of Variety praised the film as "fascinating in its oddball complexity. Among the many vastly more expensive, live-action dystopian visions of recent cinema, you'd be hard-pressed to find anything as original or surprisingly poignant as Psychonauts."

Glenn Kenny of RogerEbert.com gave the film 3/4 stars and stated that "the movie is grisly and its sense of humor is mordant", but that it "winds up communicating a heartbreak that's pretty straightforward, all things considered".

Robert Adele of the Los Angeles Times said of the film that "as adult animation goes, "Birdboy" is its own weird, wooly, and surprisingly sensitive foray into the grimier corners of life" and that it also "plays like a troubled schoolkid's secret drawings brought to colorful, if unapologetically horrific, life".

IndieWire's Bill Desowitz crowned it "the darkest and most daring hand-drawn animated movie of the year", also adding that "at its most subversive, Birdboy offers up a bleeding Jesus doll and ghoulish attacks of the mind and body".

Megan Peters of comicbook/anime raved that the film "is a surprisingly touching one that deserves to be seen" but added that it "relishes in its surreal violence while asking audiences to watch its heroes discover what autonomy truly is".

Birdboy: The Forgotten Children grossed $13,488 in Spain.

=== Accolades ===
The film won Best Animated Feature at the 2016 Goya Awards. Alberto Vázquez scored a historic win by simultaneously receiving the prize for Best Animated Short (Decorado, which was also honored at Cannes).
