= Gabriel Osorio Vargas =

Chilean film director

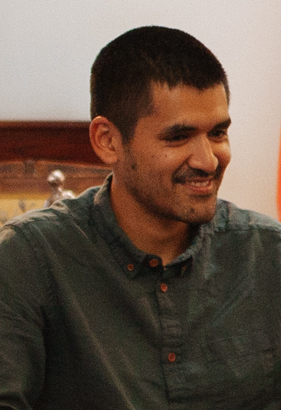
- Osorio in 2016
- Occupations: Film director; writer; animator
- Years active: 2008–present

Gabriel Osorio Vargas is a Chilean film director. He is best known for directing, animating and writing the short animated film Bear Story (2015), which won the Oscar in the category of Best Animated Short Film at the 88th Academy Awards; the first Chilean film to do so. He shared the win with producer Pato Escala Pierart. The film also entered various film festivals worldwide, receiving numerous awards and nominations. He has his own animation studio named Punkrobot. Since 2008, he has been directing various animated television series for children (Flipos, Muelin y Perlita, and Soccer Girls) and television adverts.

In 2023, he wrote and directed "In the Stars", an episode of Star Wars: Visions Volume 2, for Disney+.
