= Alberto Vázquez (artist) =

Spanish comic book artist and filmmaker

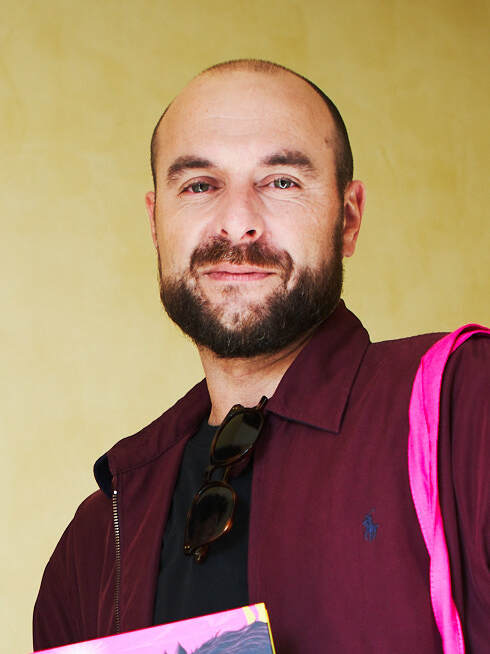
- Vázquez in 2022
- Born: Alberto Vázquez Rico; 13 October 1980 A Coruña, Spain
- Areas: Cartoonist, Writer, Artist
- Notable works: Birdboy: The Forgotten Children; Unicorn Wars

Alberto Vázquez Rico (born 1980) is a Spanish (Galician) comic book artist and filmmaker. He has received three Goya Awards for his animated films. His most famous works are Birdboy: The Forgotten Children, a feature-length adult animated movie based on his own graphic novel, and Unicorn Wars, an original feature-length adult animated film. He is also a drummer in the Mano de obra band.

== Career ==
He studied in the Faculty of Fine Arts of Pontevedra and Technical University of Valencia. One of the co-founders of Polaqia comic-book creators group, he published his first album in 2002. His comic books include Freda (2003, with Kike Benlloch), Psiconautas (2006) and El evangelio de Judas (2007). His drawings were published in El País, he also illustrated works of Edgar Allan Poe and H. P. Lovecraft.

In 2011, together with Pedro Rivero, he adapted his own graphic novel, Psiconautas, in a form of a short animated film under the title Birdboy. It won a Goya Award and encouraged them to direct the 76-minute version, Birdboy: The Forgotten Children, which premiered in 2016. In the next year, Vázquez received two more Goya Awards: one for the best animated feature film and one for a short (Decorado).

On June 16, 2020, a trailer was released for his next feature film, Unicorn Wars, which is an adult animated film about the gruesome war against teddy bears and unicorns, or as the teddy bears call them, devils. A year after the trailer debuted, Vázquez and the crew of Unicorn Wars was at the Annecy International Animation Film Festival in a Work In Progress panel in which it took place at the Salle Pierre Lamy. He explained the production process, part of the plot, and the festival shown clips.

== Bibliography ==
=== As Author and Illustrator ===
- Psiconautas (2007)
- El evangelio de Judas (2007)
- Alter Ego (2008)
- A Caza (2020)

== Filmography ==
=== Feature-length ===
Year	Title	Director	Writer	Other	Notes
2015	Psiconautas: Los Niños Olvidados	Yes	Yes	Yes	Co-written and co-directed with Pedro Rivero; Also layout artist and art director Based on his novel "Psiconautas"
2022	Unicorn Wars	Yes	Yes	Yes	also actor role as "Sonrisas"
2025	Decorado	Yes	Yes	Yes	

=== Shorts ===
Year	Title	Director	Writer	Other	Notes
2011	Judas, Catholic Squirrell	Yes	No	Yes	Co-directed with Boris Dolenc; Also illustrator
2011	Birdboy	Yes	Yes	Yes	Co-written and co-directed with Pedro Rivero; Also associate producer, layout artist, storyboard artist and art director Based on his novel "Psiconautas"
2012	Ramiro, Sucia Rata	Yes	Yes	Yes	Also animator
2013	Sangre de unicornio	Yes	Yes	Yes	Co-written with Pedro Rivero; Also animation assistant, clean up, designs and backgrounds, art, storyboard artist and actor role as "Narrator"
2016	Decorado	Yes	Yes	No	
2020	Homeless Home	Yes	Yes	Yes	Also production designer

== Accolades ==
=== Goya Awards ===
Year	Category	Film	Result
2011	Best Animated Short Film	Birdboy	Winner
2014	Best Animated Short Film	Sangre de unicornio	Nominated
2016	Best Animated Film	Birdboy: The Forgotten Children	Winner
2016	Best Animated Short Film	Decorado	Winner
2020	Best Animated Short Film	Homeless Home	Nominated
2022	Best Animated Film	Unicorn Wars	Winner

=== Other awards ===
- 2011: Award for Best Animated Short Film, Festival de Cans, for Birdboy.
- 2016: Best feature-length animation, Stuttgart International Festival of Animated Film, for Birdboy: The Forgotten Children.
- 2017: Jury Prize for Best Animated Short Film, Festival de Cans, for Decorado.
- 2017: Best short film in International Competition, Short Waves Festival, for Decorado.
