= Paper Port (TV series) =

- Puerto Papel (Spanish); Porto Papel (Portuguese)
- Genre: Comedy; Adventure; Fantasy; Children's television series
- Created by: Alvaro Ceppi; Hugo Covarrubias; Carlos Bleycher; Cristian Louit; Gabriel Noe
- Written by: Carlos Bleycher
- Countries of origin: Chile; Argentina; Brazil; Colombia
- Original language: Spanish
- No. of seasons: 2
- No. of episodes: 52

Production
- Producers: Gabriel Noé; Paula Taborda dos Guaranys
- Running time: 11 minutes
- Production company: Zumbástico Studios

Original release
- Network: Señal Colombia (Colombia); TVN (Chile); Pakapaka (Argentina); Gloob (Brazil)
- Release: 2015 – 2018

Paper Port (Spanish: Puerto Papel) is a 2016 animated television series produced by Zumbastico Studios. The series blends stop-motion and 2D animation with papercraft characters and environments, in a technique called Papermotion.

The series was co-produced by the channels Televisión Nacional de Chile (Chile), Pakapaka (Argentina), Gloob (Brazil), and Señal Colombia. Additionally, it's also produced by Pipeline Studios in Canada and distributed by Millimages in France. It first aired in 2016. It also airs on Discovery Kids (Latin America). Paper Port's season 2 is in production, as well as a movie.

== Plot ==
Matilde, a 12-year-old girl, spends her vacations at her grandfather's house in the seaside city of Paper Port. After finding a magic coconut she wakes up every day with a mysterious new power, which she has to deal with in each episode, together with her friends Carlos, Ferni, and Boldo.

== Characters ==
- Matilde - is a curious 12-year-old girl
- Carlos - is Matilde's best friend
- Barbacrespa - is Matilde's grandfather
- Mortimer - is Matilde's pet fish
- Ferni - is Matilde's best friend
- Boldo - is Matilde's best friend

== Cast ==
=== Spanish cast ===
- Carolina Ayala – Matilde
- Andrea Fröhlich – Carlos
- Orlando Noguera – Barbacrespa and Jefe Astudillo
- Fabián Hernández – Mortimer
- Paula Barros – Ferni
- Jonathan Ramírez – Boldo
- Alejandro Toro – Tropecio Ferguson

=== Portuguese cast ===
- Matilde - Flávia Saddy
- Carlos - Luciano Monteiro
- Barbacrespa - Júlio Chaves
- Mortimer - Ricardo Schnetzer
- Ferni - Luiza Cezar
- Boldo - Renan Freitas
- Chefe Haroldo - Mário Jorge de Andrade
- Tropécio - Philippe Maia
- Menino Pirulito - Arthur Salerno

=== English cast ===
- Cristina Vee or Kara Eberle – Matilda (Matilde)
- Bryce Papenbrook – Charlie (Carlos)
- Erin Fitzgerald - Felicia (Ferni)

=== French cast ===
- Jehanne Thellier – Mathilde
- Louis Lecordier – Charlie
- Gilles Serna - Grand-père
- Julien Masdoua - Mortimer and Mr. Patatalo
- Cécile Heredia - Felicia
- Clément Ducros - Bob
- Voice director - Brigitte Lecordier

== Episodes ==
=== Season 1 (2015-2016) ===
Episode Title	Written by:	Produced by:	Airdate:
Matilde Todo Las Dias			Unknown date, 2015
Alergia Climatica			2015
Flatulancias del Tiempo			2015
Exprimido de Sentimientos			2015
Risas, Mentrias y Video			2016
A La Vuelta del Sombrero			2016
Teletransportilde			2016
Dia Nacional del Queso			2016
La Palabrota			2016
Corre Matilde, Corre			2016
Amor de Papel			
La Vida Secreta de los Arboles			
Todo o Nada			
El Caso			
El Titere			
Insomnia			
Una Historia de Patatas			
Patente Pendiente			
El Misterio			
La Vida en Patineta			
Crece, Matilde			
El Regreso de Norman el Oloroso II: 2da Parte, La Venganza			
Cambio de Papel			
Habia una Vez			
El Final del Verano (Part 1)			
El Final del Verano (Part 2)			

=== Season 2 (2018) ===
Episode Title:	Written by:	Produced by:	Airdate:
El Utimo Verano en la Tierra			Unknown date, 2018
Otra Historia de Patata			
Multilde			
Secretos y Patinetas			
Juega Matilde!			
Amor Sin Plumas			
Una Loba (Pre) Adolescente			
La Zone Papelosa			
Cantando Bajo el Papel			
La Vida de los Otros			
Yo, Jefe Astudillo			
Volver a Puerto Papel (Part 1)			
Volver a Puerto Papel (Part 2)			
Matzilla			
La Nina Pez			
Papemon			
Fiebre de Papel por la Noche			
El Alcalde			
El Regreso de Bobby Jock			
Donde Viven los Papemonstruos			
Los Anos Papeltasticos			
El Big Bang de Papel			
La Pezuna Purpura del Puerto			
Mecanica Popular			
Hasta el Fin del Papel Parte (Part 1)			
Hasta el Fin del Papel Parte (Part 2) (finale)			
