= Robot Dreams (film) =

2023 animated film by Pablo Berger

- Theatrical release poster
- Directed by: Pablo Berger
- Screenplay by: Pablo Berger
- Based on: Robot Dreams by Sara Varon
- Produced by: Ibon Cormenzana; Ignasi Estapé; Sandra Tapia Díaz; Jérôme Vidal; Pablo Berger
- Edited by: Fernando Franco
- Music by: Alfonso de Vilallonga
- Production companies: Arcadia Motion Pictures; Lokiz Films; Noodles Production; Les Films du Worso; Elle Driver; Mama Films; RTVE; Movistar Plus+
- Distributed by: BTeam Pictures (Spain); Wild Bunch (France)
- Release dates: 21 May 2023 (Cannes); 6 December 2023 (Spain); 27 December 2023 (France)
- Running time: 102 minutes
- Countries: Spain; France
- Budget: €5 million
- Box office: €10.4 million

Robot Dreams (French: Mon ami robot) is a 2023 animated tragicomedy film written and directed by Pablo Berger. A Spanish-French co-production, it is based on the 2007 graphic novel of the same name by Sara Varon. The film follows an unusual friendship between a Labrador Retriever and a robot in New York City in 1985. The film has no dialogue. (Note: While the film itself does not contain dialogue, spoken efforts are heard throughout. Dog and Robot are both voiced by Ivan Labanda)

Robot Dreams had its world premiere at the 76th Cannes Film Festival on 21 May 2023, in the Special Screenings section. It received critical acclaim and won Best Film in the Contrechamp section of the Annecy International Animation Film Festival as well as Best Independent Animated Feature at the 51st Annie Awards. It also won the Goya Award for Best Animated Film and the European Film Award for Best Animated Feature Film, and was nominated for Best Animated Feature at the 96th Academy Awards.

== Plot ==
In 1985 Manhattan, anthropomorphic Labrador Dog Varon lives alone. After seeing a TV advertisement, Dog decides to order a robot friend, which he assembles upon delivery and then takes out to explore Manhattan. They have lots of fun together, including rollerskating in Central Park to the song "September" by Earth, Wind & Fire. Over the course of the summer, the two become inseparable friends.

As the summer comes to an end, Dog takes Robot to the beach, where they spend a long day playing in the water and later fall asleep. They wake up after all other visitors have left, and Dog realizes that Robot cannot move (having been rusted by water); a disheartened Dog is forced to head home for the night without Robot. Dog returns the following day with repair tools, only to discover that the beach is closed until 1 June of the following year. After some failed attempts to get inside the beach, Dog relents to wait until he can go and rescue Robot next year.

Throughout Robot's time on the beach, it dreams of various scenarios where it manages to escape from the beach and return to Dog's apartment, only to eventually return to the reality of being stuck on the beach. One of Robot's legs is severed by some rabbits, who use part of it to fill a hole in their sinking boat before discarding the leg. Meanwhile, Dog is constantly reminded of Robot and struggles to make new friends.

A monkey beachcomber sneaks onto the beach and finds a buried Robot with his metal detector. The monkey takes Robot to a junkyard to sell it. The alligator owner and his son promptly chuck Robot into a junk pile, breaking Robot into pieces and causing it to shut off. When 1 June finally arrives, Dog returns to the beach but is only able to find Robot's discarded leg. In his search, he is kicked off the beach for digging many large holes in the sand.

A raccoon named Rascal visits the junkyard and discovers Robot's head and remaining limbs. He buys the parts and takes them home, rebuilding Robot with a boombox as its new body. Meanwhile, Dog buys a new robot friend named Tin. Over the summer, Robot and Rascal form a close friendship, as do Dog and Tin. Dog goes to the beach with Tin and, learning from his past mistakes, coats Tin with oil spray and keeps it out of the water.

As Robot and Rascal have a rooftop lunch, Robot looks down and sees Dog and Tin walking down the sidewalk. Robot thinks about racing down and reuniting with Dog, but this only plays out as another of Robot's fantasies. In reality, Robot does not go down, but uses its boombox body to play "September". Dog hears and cannot help dancing, with Robot matching his moves. Dog spots Robot out of the corner of his eye, but Robot hides, not wishing to disrupt Dog's new friendship. Tin and Dog dance down the street. Robot returns to Rascal, and the two dance happily together on the roof.

== Production ==
In 2008, Sara Varon was approached by an unspecified animation studio to produce a film adaptation of Robot Dreams, which would have been done entirely using computer animation. This project never materialized.

Berger first read Varon's graphic novel in about 2010 and was affected by it (as he would later call the film his love letter to 80s New York). After making his first two films, he went back to Robot Dreams and began visualizing how to make it into an animated film.

Initially, Berger wanted to work with Cartoon Saloon to animate the film, but abandoned plans in 2020 due to the COVID-19 pandemic. Eventually, Berger helped set up various animation studios across Spain to help to get the film made. The animation process began in mid-June 2021 in Madrid, Spain, and later on Iruñea studios opened as well in Pamplona, working parallel to the Madrid team. Ivan Labanda provides vocals for both Dog and Robot.

== Release ==
=== Festivals ===
Robot Dreams had its world premiere on 21 May 2023 in the Special Screenings section of the 76th Cannes Film Festival, then screened on 12 June 2023 at the Annecy International Animation Film Festival, on 23 July 2023 at the New Zealand International Film Festival, and on 14 August 2023 at the 29th Sarajevo Film Festival. It was screened on 7 September 2023 at the 48th Toronto International Film Festival and in October 2023 at the 56th Sitges Film Festival, and the 67th BFI London Film Festival.

=== Theatrical ===
The film was first released in Spanish theatres on 6 December 2023 by BTeam Pictures. It expanded to the French market on 27 December 2023. Curzon released the film in the United Kingdom and Ireland on 22 March 2024. Neon acquired the North American distribution rights and it was released on 31 May 2024.

=== Home media ===
The film was released on DVD and Blu-ray in the United States by Decal Releasing on 8 October 2024.

== Reception ==
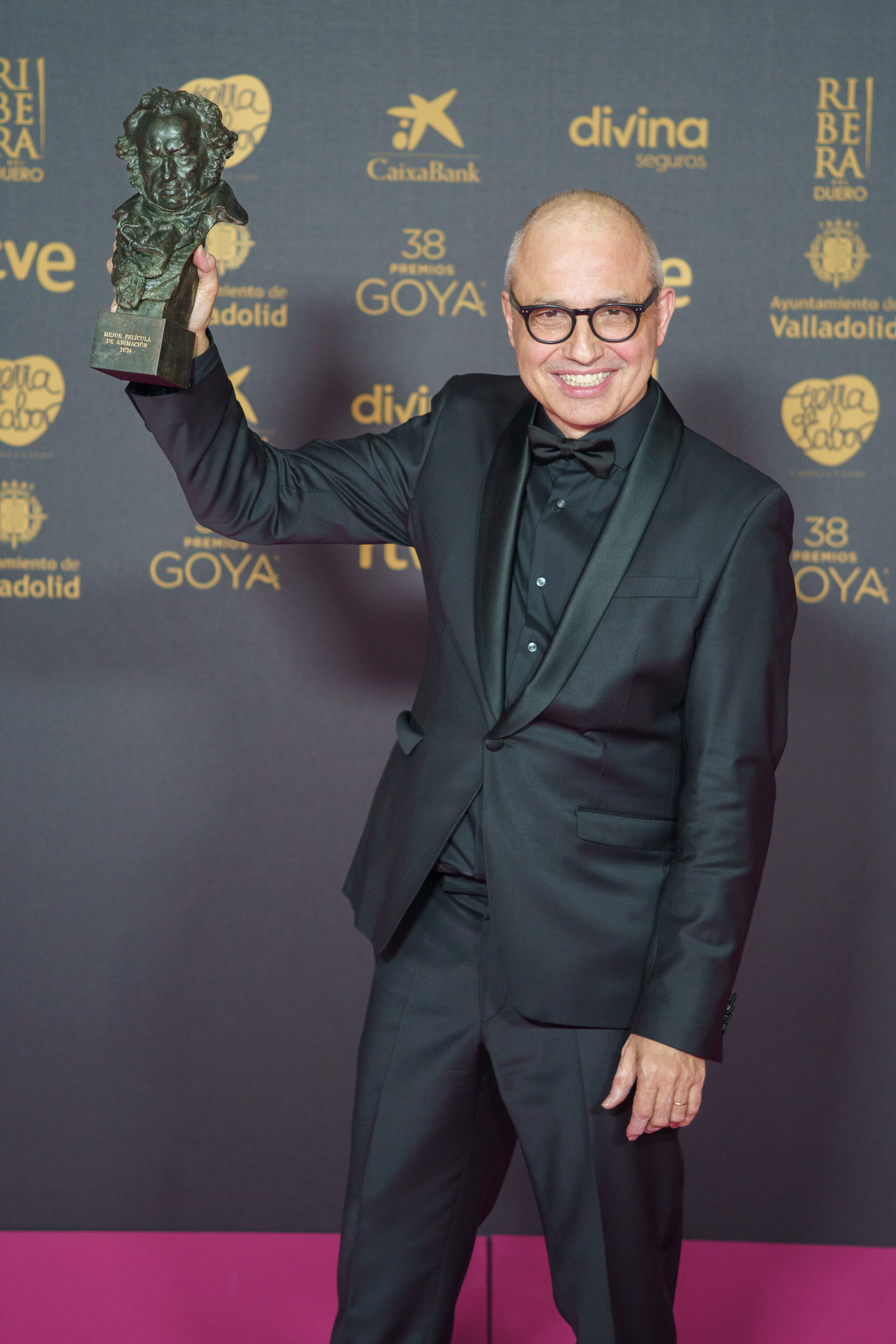
Director Pablo Berger holding the Goya Award for Best Animated Film won by the film at the 38th Goya Awards

=== Critical reception ===
On the review aggregator website Rotten Tomatoes, 98% of 137 critics' reviews are positive, with an average rating of 8.4/10. The website's consensus reads: "As heartbreaking as it is heartwarming, Robot Dreams is the stuff good animation is made of." Metacritic, which uses a weighted average, assigned the film a score of 87 out of 100, based on 30 critics, indicating "universal acclaim".

Paula Arantzazu Ruiz of Cinemanía rated the film 5 out of 5 stars, deeming "[the relationship between] Dog and Robot to be the most amazing and beautiful friendship of the year". Robbie Collin of The Telegraph awarded the movie five stars out of five, writing that "this wonderful tale of friendship will enchant and amuse children – and leave grown-ups in tears".

Variety put Robot Dreams on its list of the 22 Overlooked Films of 2023. Rolling Stone put the film at #14 on their list for the best films of 2024.

=== Top ten lists ===
The film appeared on a number of critics' top ten lists of the best Spanish films of 2023:

- 4th — El Periódico de Catalunya (critics)
- 5th — El Español (Series & Más consensus)
- 6th — El Cultural (critics)
- 6th — El Mundo (Luis Martínez)
- 7th — Mondosonoro (consensus)

=== Accolades ===
Year	Award	Category	Recipient	Result	Ref.
2023	47th Annecy International Animation Film Festival	Contrechamp Award - Best Film	Robot Dreams	Won	
2023	56th Sitges Film Festival	Best Film	Robot Dreams	Nominated	
2023	56th Sitges Film Festival	Grand People's Choice Award for Best Feature Film in the SOFC	Robot Dreams	Won	
2023	37th Cinekid Festival	Best Children's Film	Robot Dreams	Nominated	
2023	8th Coronado Island Film Festival	Best Animated Feature	Robot Dreams	Won	
2023	36th European Film Awards	European Animated Feature Film	Robot Dreams	Won	
2023	44th Boston Society of Film Critics Awards	Best Animated Film	Robot Dreams	Runner-up (Note: Shared with Teenage Mutant Ninja Turtles: Mutant Mayhem, Spider-Man: Across the Spider-Verse and The Peasants.)	
2023	49th Los Angeles Film Critics Association Awards	Best Animated Film	Robot Dreams	Runner-up	
2023	36th Chicago Film Critics Association Awards	Best Animated Feature Film	Robot Dreams	Nominated	
2023	29th Forqué Awards	Best Animation Film	Robot Dreams	Won	
2023	20th St. Louis Film Critics Association Awards	Best Animated Film	Robot Dreams	Nominated	
2023	27th Toronto Film Critics Association Awards	Best Animated Feature	Robot Dreams	Won	
2023	15th Indiana Film Journalists Association	Best Film	Robot Dreams	Nominated	
2023	15th Indiana Film Journalists Association	Best Animated Film	Robot Dreams	Runner-up	
2023	15th Indiana Film Journalists Association	Original Vision	Robot Dreams	Nominated	
2023	28th San Diego Film Critics Society Awards	Best Animated Film	Robot Dreams	Nominated	
2023	28th Florida Film Critics Circle Awards	Best Animated Film	Robot Dreams	Nominated	
2024	13th Georgia Film Critics Association Awards	Best Animated Film	Robot Dreams	Nominated	
2024	22nd San Francisco Bay Area Film Critics Circle Awards	Best Animated Film	Robot Dreams	Nominated	
2024	23rd Nevada Film Critics Society	Best Animated Feature	Robot Dreams	Won	
2024	17th Houston Film Critics Society Awards	Best Animated Feature	Robot Dreams	Nominated	
2024	27th Online Film Critics Society Awards	Best Animated Film	Robot Dreams	Nominated	
2024	11th Feroz Awards	Best Comedy Film	Robot Dreams	Won	
2024	11th Feroz Awards	Best Original Soundtrack	Alfonso de Vilallonga	Won	
2024	11th Feroz Awards	Best Poster	José Luis Ágreda	Won	
2024	3rd Carmen Awards	Best Non-Andalusian Produced Film	Robot Dreams	Nominated	
2024	3rd Carmen Awards	Best Editing	Fernando Franco	Nominated	
2024	3rd Carmen Awards	Best Art Direction	José Luis Ágreda	Nominated	
2024	79th CEC Medals	Best Film	Robot Dreams	Nominated	
2024	79th CEC Medals	Best Animated Film	Robot Dreams	Won	
2024	79th CEC Medals	Best Director	Pablo Berger	Nominated	
2024	79th CEC Medals	Best Adapted Screenplay	Pablo Berger	Nominated	
2024	79th CEC Medals	Best Music	Alfonso de Vilallonga	Won	
2024	16th Gaudí Awards	Best Animated Film	Robot Dreams	Won	
2024	16th Gaudí Awards	Best Adapted Screenplay	Pablo Berger	Nominated	
2024	16th Gaudí Awards	Best Original Score	Alfonso de Vilallonga	Won	
2024	44th London Film Critics' Circle Awards	Animated Film of the Year	Robot Dreams	Nominated	
2024	38th Goya Awards	Best Animated Film	Robot Dreams	Won	
2024	38th Goya Awards	Best Adapted Screenplay	Pablo Berger	Won	
2024	38th Goya Awards	Best Editing	Fernando Franco	Nominated	
2024	38th Goya Awards	Best Original Score	Alfonso de Vilallonga	Nominated	
2024	21st International Cinephile Society Awards	Best Animated Film	Robot Dreams	Runner-up	
2024	51st Annie Awards	Best Animated Feature - Independent	Robot Dreams	Won	
2024	51st Annie Awards	Best Character Design - Feature	Daniel Fernandez Casas	Nominated	
2024	51st Annie Awards	Best Direction - Feature	Pablo Berger, Benoît Feroumont	Nominated	
2024	51st Annie Awards	Best Storyboarding - Feature	Maca Gil	Nominated	
2024	51st Annie Awards	Best Writing - Feature	Pablo Berger	Nominated	
2024	28th Satellite Awards	Best Animated or Mixed Media Feature	Robot Dreams	Nominated	
2024	17th Alliance of Women Film Journalists Awards	Best Animated Film	Robot Dreams	Nominated	
2024	96th Academy Awards	Best Animated Feature	Pablo Berger, Ibon Cormenzana, Ignasi Estapé and Sandra Tapia Díaz	Nominated	
2024	11th Platino Awards	Best Animated Film	Robot Dreams	Won	
2024	11th Platino Awards	Best Original Score	Alfonso de Vilallonga	Won	
2024	7th ALMA Awards	Best Screenplay in a Comedy Film	Pablo Berger	Won	
2024	7th Quirino Awards	Best Ibero-American Feature Film	Robot Dreams	Won	
2024	7th Quirino Awards	Best Visual Development	José Luis Ágreda, Daniel Fernández Casas	Nominated	
2024	7th Quirino Awards	Best Sound Design and Original Music	Fabiola Ordoyo, Alfonso Vilallonga	Won	
2025	5th Critics' Choice Super Awards	Best Superhero Movie	Robot Dreams	Nominated	

== Future ==
In March 2024, during a screening in the Aero Theatre, director Pablo Berger expressed interest in making a sequel "involving Dog and Robot meeting up with their respective friends for Thanksgiving" or a spin-off of the film:

"I’ve thought about revisiting this world, maybe with a spin-off of some of the characters. A horror film with the bunnies, or Duck goes to Barcelona? But we’re in L.A., so someone could steal my idea." said Berger.

== See also ==
- List of French films of 2023
- List of Spanish films of 2023
- Minimalist film
