= Robot Dreams (graphic novel) =

Graphic novel by Sara Varon

Robot Dreams is a 2007 children's graphic novel by Sara Varon, who is both the author and illustrator. It is about a dog who, wanting companionship, obtains a robot via mail order, but the dog has to abandon the robot after a beach trip. Eventually the dog finds other friends while a raccoon fixes the robot.

There is little text present in the work, and none of it is dialog. Therefore, no word balloons are present that impact images.

It was adapted into the film Robot Dreams.

== Background ==
The author used the death of her companion animal, a dog, as inspiration for the story.

== Contents ==
Barbara Postema stated that the artwork is "deceptively simple".

Postema stated that "is possible that Dog functions as an alter ego for Varon." She added that the dog character is portrayed as "relatively gender neutral," but that "it is appropriate" to use she/her pronouns for the dog.

== Reception ==
Booklist described it as "A 2008 Great Graphic Novel for Teens."

Kirkus Reviews stated that the work is "thoughtful, provocative" and that it is "Witty and plaintive by turns".

Publishers Weekly gave the book a starred review and described it as "Tender, funny and wise."

Travis Jonker, in School Library Journal, gave a recommendation to read the book, stating it is a "rewarding and surprisingly mature story of friendship." Betsy Bird of the Evanston Public Library, in the same publication, stated that it is "weirdly magnificent " and demonstrates the author's "grasp of what makes a good narrative".
