= Festival de Cans =

Short films festival in O Porriño, Spain

Cans Festival Festival de Cans
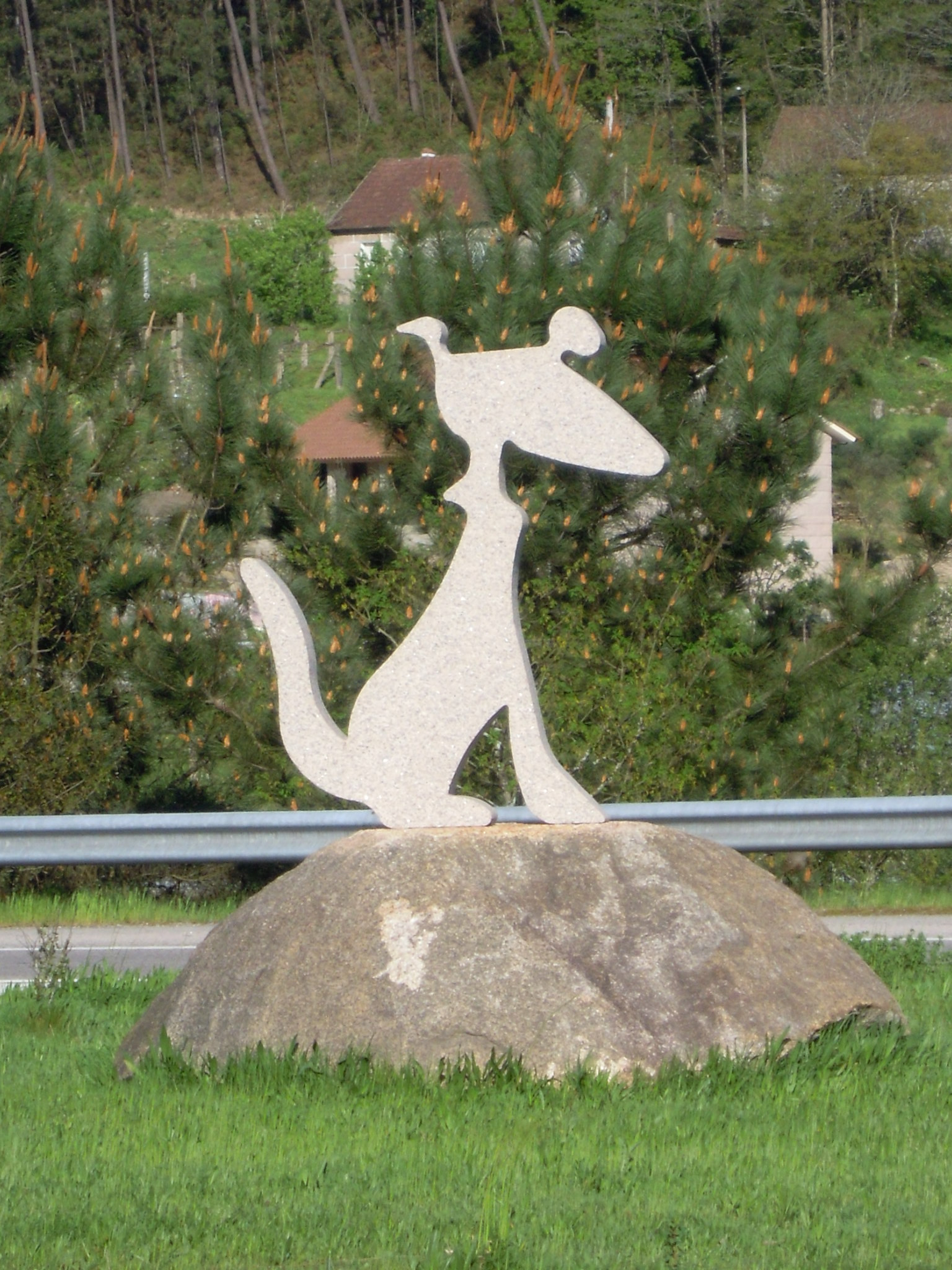
- Statue of the Cans Festival logo
- Genre: Short film festival
- Frequency: Annually
- Locations: O Porriño, Spain
- Inaugurated: May 2004
- Most recent: May 2022
- Attendance: c. 10,000
- Organiser: Asociación Cultural Arela
- People: Alfonso Pato, Director
- Website: www.festivaldecans.gal

The Cans Festival (Galician: Festival de Cans) is an annual short film festival held in the parish of Cans (O Porriño, Spain) that coincides with the near-homophonous Cannes Film Festival. The festival is organized by the Arela Cultural Association and coordinated by the scriptwriter Alfonso Pato.

The festival's signature feature is its 'agroglamour' and unusual screening locations like barns, basements, empty houses, wine cellars, where the audience is transported by locals in two-wheel tractors-chimpíns.

== Profile ==
The Cans Festival was established in 2004 as a kind of joke based on the phonetic similarity between Cans (which also means dogs in Galician language) and Cannes. The founders wanted an event that would go parallel with the glamorous Cannes Film Festival. From this funny word game emerged a serious film festival, dedicated to short-length movies as well as animation and video-clips. The Cans Festival runs every third or fourth weekend of May in the parish of Cans, O Porriño, Pontevedra Spain, which has an official population of 400 inhabitants although during the festival that number rises to more than 10,000 people. The festival's signature features are its location and the peculiar cinema rooms: sheds, basements, empty houses, wine cellars and even henhouses are transferred into screening locations, and the audience are ferried by locals to and from the screenings on two-wheel tractors, known locally as chimpíns.

The festival is dedicated to short film, and every year the official section shows the best Galician productions of the season. Apart from short films, the festival's line-up includes documentaries and full-length films premieres, a video clip contest, talks with prestigious filmmakers, presentations of experimental productions like web series, training programs for AV students, etc. The festival's sections are: Non Fiction, Novas Camadas (for the directors under 25), Animation, Video Clips. The prize fund of the festival is 12,000 euros. The festival also hosts multiple educational and entertainment events such as masterclasses by established filmmakers, music shows and concerts, etc.

The director of the festival is Alfonso Pato. The event is managed and supported by the Arela Cultural Association and personally Keka Losada, Arela's president. Other sponsors are Galicia Calidade, Xunta de Galicia, O Porriño City Council, Pontevedra Council and the Ministry of Culture of Spain, and AGADIC.

Filmmakers, film directors, musicians, actors and actress like Isabel Coixet, Juanma Bajo Ulloa, Fernando León, Manuel Martín Cuenca, Patricia Ferreira, Luis Tosar, Tristán Ulloa, Mabel Rivera, María Pujalte, José Sacristán, Xoel López, Kiko Veneno, Iván Ferreiro, Coque Malla, Javier Krahe, Manuel Rivas, Lucía Echevarría, Suso de Toro, El Gran Wyoming, Teté Delgado, Antonio Durán "Morris", Julián Hernández or Emma Suárez have been in Festival de Cans as guests, rewarded or speakers.

In 2009, it received the Premio da Crítica Galicia, in the section of Cultural Initiatives. In 2011, Pontevedra Provincial Council gave the festival the Premio Provincial á Cultura in the category of Innovation and Avant-garde. In 2013 it received the Premio Internacional Ateneo de Ourense. In 2023, the festival was honoured with Premio CREA for '20 years of outstanding work in promotion of Galician filmmaking'.

In 2023, the festival launched a touring program: the winning shorts will be screened in Caminha, Lisbon, Madrid, Paris, and Brussels.

In 2024, a record number of 261 applications were registered in competition.

== Awards ==
- Honorary Pedigree Award
- Best Fiction Short Film Award (Jury)
- Best Animation Short Film Award (Jury)
- Best Fiction Short Film Award (Public)
- Best Animation Short Film Award (Public)
- Best Fiction Short Film Award (Locals)
- Best Actress Award (Jury)
- Best Actor Award (Jury)
- Best Screenplay Award (Jury)
- Best Videoclip Award (Jury)
- Best Videoclip Award (Public)
