= Isabel Herguera =

Spanish film director

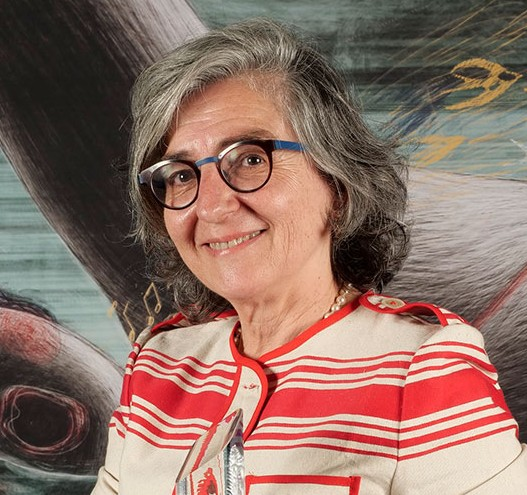
- Isabel Herguera
- Born: 1961 (age 64–65)
- Occupation: Film Director
- Notable work: Sultana's Dream

Isabel Herguera is a Spanish artist, filmmaker, cultural manager, professor, and critic. She has won more than 50 awards at various international film festivals. She graduated from UPV-Bilbao, continued her studies at the Kunstakademie Düsseldorf in 1988, and obtained a master's degree at CalArts. In her 1989 movies Safari and Song of the Round Trip animation, sculpture and video were merged and together created a special work of art.

== Career ==
In 1994, she founded an animation studio in Los Angeles. In 2003, she returned to Spain from Los Angeles. In 2003–2011, she was the director of Animac, the International Festival of Animated film of Catalonia in Lleida. She also coordinated the motion picture laboratory of the Arteleku art centre in Donostia-San Sebastian. Over the years, she has served as chair and jury member of various international film festivals.

In 2005 she started as a teacher at the National Institute of Design in Ahmedabad, India. As a guest animation professor, she worked at the China Central Academy of Fine Arts in Beijing, China. In 2017 she became a professor of the animation department in Kunsthochschule für Medien Köln, Germany.

In 2012, she became one of the 12 most celebrated Basque filmmakers and directed one chapter of Kalebegiak, a movie that comprised 12 different perspectives on San Sebastián.

Herguera's first feature film, Sultana's Dream, was released in 2023. The story is based on a 1905 dystopian fairy-tale by Bangladeshi social activist Begum Rokeya. In this movie she also combined different techniques to underline and emphasize the differences between storylines — watercolour, cut-outs of the shadow theatre and Mehndi. While it was still in the project stage, the film won the 2022 TorinoFilmLab Audience Design Award of the European Work in Progress in Cologne platform and received a €378,000 grant from the Spanish Film Institute.

== Filmography ==
- Safari (1989);
- Song of a Round Trip (1989);
- La Gallina Ciega (2005);
- Ámár (2010);
- Under the Pillow (2012 short);
- Winter Love (2015);
- Sailor's Grave (2016)
- Sultana's Dream (2023).

== Sources ==
- Male, Alan (2019). A Companion to Illustration: Art and Theory. Wiley Blackwell. p. 136. ISBN 9781119185536.
- Bendazzi, Giannalberto (2016). Animation: A World History: Volume III: Contemporary Times. CRC Press. ISBN 978-1-138-85482-6.
