= List of Paramount Pictures theatrical animated feature films =

This list of animated feature films consists of animated films produced or released by Paramount Pictures.

Paramount releases films from Paramount-owned and non-Paramount owned animation studios. Most films listed below are from Paramount Animation which began as a feature animation department of Paramount in 2015. Paramount has also released animated films by other production companies, such as DreamWorks Animation (which is now owned by Universal Pictures).

Other studio units have also released films theatrically, primarily Fleischer Studios, Famous Studios and Nickelodeon Movies, and the studio's distribution unit, which acquires film rights from outside animation studios to release films under the Paramount label.

== Films ==
Color legend
Fleischer Studios (1939–41)	
Nickelodeon Movies/Animation Studio (1998–present)	
Paramount Animation (2015–present)	
DreamWorks Animation (2006-12); (rights now owned by Universal Pictures)	
Other Paramount studio	
Third-party studio	
Live-action/animation hybrid	^{S}
Distribution only	^{D}
VOD releases	^{V}
An adult animated production	^{A}

=== American releases ===
Title	Original theatrical release date (Note: Listed are the original theatrical release dates in the United States (or other non-U.S. territories) when the film was contributed by Paramount. Different distributors are attributed and credited for distributing each film throughout the history of Paramount.)	Animation studio
Gulliver's Travels	December 22, 1939	Fleischer Studios
Mr. Bug Goes to Town	December 5, 1941	Fleischer Studios
Charlotte's Web	March 1, 1973	Hanna-Barbera
Aladdin and His Magic Lamp^{[D]}	July 1, 1975 (Note: Original release date was January 28, 1970) (Note: Released by Paramount Pictures in North America)	Films Jean Image
Coonskin^{[A]}^{[D]}	August 1, 1975 (Note: Planned to be released by Paramount Pictures, however due to controversy, it ultimately ended up being distributed by Bryanston Distributing Company.)	Bakshi Animation
Race for Your Life, Charlie Brown	August 24, 1977	Melendez Films
Bon Voyage, Charlie Brown (and Don't Come Back!)	May 30, 1980	Melendez Films
Heidi's Song	November 19, 1982	Hanna-Barbera
Cool World^{[S]}^{[A]}	July 10, 1992	Bakshi Animation
Bebe's Kids^{[A]}	July 31, 1992	Hyperion Animation
Beavis and Butt-Head Do America^{[A]}	December 20, 1996	MTV Animation and The Geffen Film Company
The Rugrats Movie	November 20, 1998	Nickelodeon Movies and Klasky Csupo
South Park: Bigger, Longer & Uncut^{[A]}	June 30, 1999	Comedy Central Films, Scott Rudin Productions and Warner Bros. Pictures
Rugrats in Paris: The Movie	November 17, 2000	Nickelodeon Movies and Klasky Csupo
Jimmy Neutron: Boy Genius	December 21, 2001	Nickelodeon Movies, O Entertainment and DNA Productions
Hey Arnold!: The Movie	June 28, 2002	Nickelodeon Movies, Snee-Oosh, Inc. and Nickelodeon Animation Studio
The Wild Thornberrys Movie	December 20, 2002	Nickelodeon Movies and Klasky Csupo
Rugrats Go Wild	June 13, 2003	Nickelodeon Movies and Klasky Csupo
The SpongeBob SquarePants Movie^{[S]}	November 19, 2004	Nickelodeon Movies and United Plankton Pictures
Over the Hedge^{[D]}	May 19, 2006	DreamWorks Animation
Barnyard	August 4, 2006	Nickelodeon Movies and O Entertainment
Flushed Away^{[D]}	November 3, 2006	DreamWorks Animation and Aardman Animations
Shrek the Third^{[D]}	May 18, 2007	DreamWorks Animation and PDI/DreamWorks
Bee Movie^{[D]}	November 2, 2007	DreamWorks Animation and Columbus 81 Productions
Beowulf^{[A]}	November 16, 2007	ImageMovers and Warner Bros. Pictures
Kung Fu Panda^{[D]}	June 6, 2008	DreamWorks Animation
Madagascar: Escape 2 Africa^{[D]}	November 7, 2008	DreamWorks Animation and PDI/DreamWorks
Monsters vs. Aliens^{[D]}	March 27, 2009	DreamWorks Animation
How to Train Your Dragon^{[D]}	March 26, 2010	DreamWorks Animation
Shrek Forever After^{[D]}	May 21, 2010	DreamWorks Animation
Megamind^{[D]}	November 5, 2010	DreamWorks Animation and PDI/DreamWorks
Rango	March 4, 2011	Blind Wink, Nickelodeon Movies, GK Films and Industrial Light & Magic
Kung Fu Panda 2^{[D]}	May 26, 2011	DreamWorks Animation
Puss in Boots^{[D]}	October 28, 2011	DreamWorks Animation
The Adventures of Tintin^{[D]}	December 21, 2011	Nickelodeon Movies, Amblin Entertainment, WingNut Films and Columbia Pictures
Madagascar 3: Europe's Most Wanted^{[D]}	June 8, 2012	DreamWorks Animation and PDI/DreamWorks
Rise of the Guardians^{[D]}	November 21, 2012	DreamWorks Animation
The SpongeBob Movie: Sponge Out of Water^{[S]}	February 6, 2015	Paramount Animation, Nickelodeon Movies and United Plankton Pictures
Anomalisa^{[A]}^{[D]}	December 30, 2015	Starburns Industries and HanWay Films
Sherlock Gnomes	March 23, 2018	Paramount Animation, Metro-Goldwyn-Mayer and Rocket Pictures
Wonder Park	March 15, 2019	Paramount Animation, Nickelodeon Movies, Ilion Animation Studios and Midnight Radio Productions
Paw Patrol: The Movie^{[D]}	August 20, 2021	Nickelodeon Movies and Spin Master Entertainment
Rumble^{[V]}	December 15, 2021 (Note: Released on Paramount+ in North America)	Paramount Animation, WWE Studios, Walden Media and Reel FX Animation Studios
Paws of Fury: The Legend of Hank^{[D]}	July 15, 2022	Nickelodeon Movies, Aniventure, Blazing Productions, Ltd., Brooksfilms, Cinesite, Align, GFM Animation, Flying Tigers Entertainment and HB Wink Animation
Teenage Mutant Ninja Turtles: Mutant Mayhem	August 2, 2023	Nickelodeon Movies and Point Grey Pictures
Paw Patrol: The Mighty Movie^{[D]}	September 29, 2023	Nickelodeon Movies and Spin Master Entertainment
Under the Boardwalk	October 27, 2023 (Note: Limited theatrical release)	Paramount Animation and Big Kid Pictures
IF^{[D]}^{[S]}	May 17, 2024	Sunday Night Productions and Maximum Effort
Transformers One	September 20, 2024	Paramount Animation, Hasbro Entertainment and Di Bonaventura Pictures
Smurfs^{[S]}	July 18, 2025	Paramount Animation, Marcy Media Films, Peyo Company, LAFIG Belgium and IMPS
The SpongeBob Movie: Search for SquarePants^{[S]}	December 19, 2025	Paramount Animation and Nickelodeon Movies
Avatar Aang: The Last Airbender	July 24, 2026	Nickelodeon Movies and Avatar Studios
Paw Patrol: The Dino Movie	August 14, 2026	Paramount Animation, Nickelodeon Movies and Spin Master Entertainment

=== International releases ===
Title	Original theatrical release date (Note: Listed are the original theatrical release dates in the United States (or other non-U.S. territories) when the film was contributed by Paramount. Different distributors are attributed and credited for distributing each film throughout the history of Paramount.)	Animation studio
Cine Gibi: O Filme^{[D]}	July 9, 2004 (Brazil) (Note: Released by Paramount Pictures outside North America)	Mauricio de Sousa Produções and TeleImage
Tad, the Lost Explorer^{[D]}	August 31, 2012 (Spain)	Lightbox Entertainment
The Reef 2: High Tide^{[D]}	October 25, 2013 (United Kingdom)	WonderWorld Studios
Capture the Flag^{[D]}	August 25, 2015 (Spain)	Lightbox Entertainment
Mune: Guardian of the Moon^{[D]}	October 14, 2015 (France)	On Animation Studios
The Little Prince	August 5, 2016 (France)	On Animation Studios
Tad the Lost Explorer and the Secret of King Midas^{[D]}	August 25, 2017 (Spain)	Lightbox Entertainment
The SpongeBob Movie: Sponge on the Run^{[S]}	August 14, 2020 (Canada and China) (Note: Not released theatrically in the United States)	Paramount Animation, Nickelodeon Movies, United Plankton Pictures and MRC
Tad, the Lost Explorer and the Emerald Tablet^{[D]}	August 26, 2022 (Spain)	Lightbox Entertainment
The Tiger's Apprentice	April 4, 2024 (Australia)	Paramount Animation, New Republic Pictures and Jane Startz Productions
Tad and the Magic Lamp^{[D]}	August 26, 2026 (Spain)	Lightbox Entertainment

=== Upcoming ===
Title	Intended theatrical release date by Paramount Pictures	Animation studio
The Angry Birds Movie 3^{[D]}	December 23, 2026	Rovio Entertainment, Sega Sammy Group, Prime Focus Studios, One Cool Films, Flywheel Media, and Dentsu
Zac Power^{[D]}	January 7, 2027 (Australia)	Flying Bark Productions
Sonic the Hedgehog 4^{[S]}	March 19, 2027	Sega Sammy Group, Original Film, Marza Animation Planet and Blur Studio
Untitled Teenage Mutant Ninja Turtles: Mutant Mayhem sequel	August 13, 2027	Paramount Animation, Nickelodeon Movies and Point Grey Pictures
Freddy the 13th	October 13, 2028	Paramount Animation
Untitled Teenage Mutant Ninja Turtles film^{[S]}	November 17, 2028	Nickelodeon Movies and Original Film
Untitled Sonic film^{[S]}	December 22, 2028	Sega Sammy Group, Original Film, Marza Animation Planet and Blur Studio
Untitled Mighty Mouse film	TBA	Paramount Animation and Maximum Effort
Cosmic Motors	TBA	Skydance Animation

== Highest-grossing films ==
This list does not include films produced by DreamWorks Animation, which are now owned by Universal Pictures, and films combining live-action with animation.

Rank	Film	Gross	Studio	Year	Ref.
1	The Adventures of Tintin	$373,993,951	Nickelodeon Movies, Amblin Entertainment and Columbia Pictures	2011	
2	The SpongeBob Movie: Sponge Out of Water	$325,186,032	Paramount Animation and Nickelodeon Movies	2015	
3	Rango	$245,724,603	Nickelodeon Movies and Industrial Light & Magic	2011	
4	Paw Patrol: The Mighty Movie	$202,231,360	Nickelodeon Movies and Spin Master Entertainment	2023	
5	Beowulf	$196,393,745	Shangri-La Entertainment, ImageMovers, and Warner Bros. Pictures	2007	
6	Teenage Mutant Ninja Turtles: Mutant Mayhem	$180,513,586	Nickelodeon Movies and Point Grey Pictures	2023	
7	The SpongeBob Movie: Search for SquarePants	$165,447,872	Paramount Animation and Nickelodeon Movies	2025	
8	Paw Patrol: The Dino Movie	$151,547,322	Paramount Animation, Nickelodeon Movies, and Spin Master Entertainment	2026	
9	Paw Patrol: The Movie	$144,327,371	Nickelodeon Movies and Spin Master Entertainment	2021	
10	The Rugrats Movie	$140,894,675	Nickelodeon Movies and Klasky Csupo	1998	

== Notes ==
Release Notes

Studio/Production Notes

Film rights Notes

== See also ==
- List of Paramount Pictures films
- List of unproduced Paramount Pictures animated projects
