= Neil Landau =

American screenwriter and playwright

- Occupations: Screen writer, playwright, producer, director
- Website: theneillandau.com

Neil Landau is an American screenwriter, playwright, producer, and director. His film and television credits include the teen comedy Don't Tell Mom the Babysitter's Dead, Melrose Place, The Magnificent Seven, Doogie Howser, M.D., The Secret World of Alex Mack and MTV's Undressed.

Neil has also worked internationally as both co-head-writer and executive script consultant on television and film projects for Sony Pictures Television International (in Russia), Freemantle Media (in Australia), and Intereconomia (in Spain).

== Career ==
He has developed numerous one-hour drama TV pilots for several studios and networks including Warner Bros., Touchstone, CBS, ABC Family, and Lifetime, and has written movies for Universal Pictures, Disney, Columbia Pictures, and 20th Century Fox.

He rewrote Tad, The Lost Explorer, an animated feature based on the popular “Tadeo Jones” comic books for El Toro and Paramount. He would then help write both of the film's sequels' English versions. He also worked as executive script consultant on the El Toro-produced film Lope, which was short-listed for an Academy Award as Best Foreign Film. He acted as executive script consultant for the El Toro/Universal Pictures film "Bruc, the Manhunt" in 2010.

Neil recently served as Executive Vice-President of Scripted Development for Amedia Film Group located in Moscow (Russia), working with writers, creative producers, story editors, and studio executives, guiding a slate of original projects including feature films, animation, miniseries, made-for-television movies, one-hour drama series, situation comedies, soap operas, and historical docudramas.

== Teaching ==
Neil teaches in the MFA in Screenwriting and Producing Programs at both UCLA School of Film & Television and USC School of Cinematic Arts. He is also a faculty advisor in the MFA in Writing Program at Goddard College.

He has authored several books on film and television. His first book, 101 Things I Learned in Film School (Grand Central Publishing), was published in May 2010. He is also a contributor to the anthology WriteNow! Screenwriting (Tarcher/Penguin); published in September 2010. He then wrote The Screenwriter's Roadmap in 2012, followed by The TV Showrunner’s Roadmap in 2014. This was followed by TV Outside the Box in 2016, and TV Writing On Demand: Creating Great Content in the Digital Era in 2018.

== Writing credits ==
=== Feature film ===
Year	Title	Director
1991	Don't Tell Mom the Babysitter's Dead (with Tara Ison)	Stephen Herek
2012	Tad, the Lost Explorer	Enrique Gato
2015	Capture the Flag	Enrique Gato
2016	Sheep and Wolves	Andrey Galat & Maksim Volkov
2017	Tad the Lost Explorer and the Secret of King Midas	Enrique Gato & David Alonso
2022	Finnick	Denis Chernov
2022	Tad, the Lost Explorer and the Emerald Tablet	Enrique Gato

=== Television ===
Year	Title	Network
1990	Doogie Howser, M.D.	ABC
1996-1997	The Secret World of Alex Mack	Nickelodeon
1997	Melrose Place	Fox
1998	The Magnificent Seven	CBS
2000	Undressed	MTV
2000-2001	Twice in a Lifetime	CTV
2007	The Young and the Restless	CBS

=== Directing ===
- The Fred Astaire Complex

=== Theatre ===
- Johnny on the Spot (2002)

== Awards and nominations ==
- The Fred Astaire Complex: Grand Prize by the California Media Association
- Etcetera and Intentions: Best Play-L.A. Valley College One-Act Play Festival Bank of America Award for Drama Excellence
- UCLA: Outstanding Instructor of the Year 1994
