= Tad Stones (franchise) =

Spanish animated adventure comedy franchise

- Created by: Enrique Gato
- Original work: Tadeo Jones (2004)
- Years: 2004–present

Print publications
- Graphic novels: Tad and the Secret of the Toactlum (2008); Tadeo Jones en el rally París-Paká (2009)

Films and television
- Films: Tad, the Lost Explorer (2012); Tad, the Lost Explorer and the Secret of King Midas (2017); Tad, the Lost Explorer and the Emerald Tablet (2022); Tad and the Magic Lamp (2026)
- Short films: Tadeo Jones (2004); Tadeo Jones and the Basement of Doom (2006)

Games
- Video games: Tadeo Jones (2013); Tadeo Jones and the Lost Manuscript (2014); Tad, the Lost Explorer and the Emerald Tablet (2022)

Tad Stones is a Spanish animated adventure comedy film franchise created and directed by Enrique Gato. It follows the adventures of Tad Stones (Tadeo Jones in the Spanish original version), a clumsy construction worker who dreams of being an archaeologist. The franchise is a parody of Indiana Jones.

The original two short films: Tadeo Jones (2004) and Tadeo Jones and the Basement of Doom (2006); were followed by two graphic novels: Tad and the Secret of the Toactlum (2008) and Tadeo Jones en el rally París-Paká (2009); and four feature films: Tad, the Lost Explorer (2012), Tad, the Lost Explorer and the Secret of King Midas (2017), Tad, the Lost Explorer and the Emerald Tablet (2022), and Tad and the Magic Lamp (2026). The franchise has yielded also three video games: Tadeo Jones (2013), Tadeo Jones and the Lost Manuscript (2014), and Tad, the Lost Explorer and the Emerald Tablet (2022).

== Short films ==
=== Tadeo Jones (2004) ===
Tad Stones enters an Egyptian pyramid where he finds a family of mummies. The story parodies elements from Raiders of the Lost Ark.

The short film released in 2004 won numerous awards, including the Goya Award for Best Animated Short Film at the 20th Goya Awards.

=== Tadeo Jones and the Basement of Doom (2006) ===
Tad tries to save some animals from a sect where they sacrifice them as an offering to their goddess. The story parodies elements from Indiana Jones and the Temple of Doom.

The short film released in 2006 won the Goya Award for Best Animated Short Film at the 22nd Goya Awards.

== Graphic novels ==
Tad's adventures were later developed into two graphic novels: Tad and the Secret of the Toactlum (2008) and Tadeo Jones en el rally París-Paká (2009).

== Films ==
=== Tad, the Lost Explorer (2012) ===
Tad, a clumsy construction worker in Chicago, dreams to be an archaeologist. Through a misunderstanding, he's mistaken for a famous professor and travels to Peru to search for the lost city of Paititi. Along with Sara Lavroff, his dog Jeff, and a local guide, he battles the Odiseus Corporation to protect an Inca treasure. The story is mainly an adaptation of the graphic novel Tad and the Secret of the Toactlum.

The film released in 2012 was nominated for five Goya Awards at the 27th Goya Awards, winning three: the Best Animated Film award; Enrique Gato the New Director award; and Javier Barreira, Gorka Magallón, Ignacio del Moral, Jordi Gasull, and Neil Landau the Best Adapted Screenplay award; with Álex Martínez and Zacarías M. de la Riva being nominated for the Best Original Score award; and "Te voy a esperar" by Juan Magán for the Best Original Song award. It also won the Best Animated Film award at the 18th Forqué Awards, at the 5th Gaudí Awards, and at the 68th CEC Awards.

=== Tad, the Lost Explorer and the Secret of King Midas (2017) ===
Tad and his friends have to save Sara from the evil Jack Rackham who has kidnapped her along with his latest discovery, a papyrus that proves the existence of Midas, the mythical King who turned everything he touched into gold.

The film released in 2017 won the Goya Award for Best Animated Film at the 32nd Goya Awards; and the Platino Award for Best Animated Film at the 5th Platino Awards. It also won the Best Animated Film award at the 10th Gaudí Awards and at the 73rd CEC Awards.

=== Tad, the Lost Explorer and the Emerald Tablet (2022) ===
Tad accidentally destroys a sarcophagus and unleashes an ancient spell that sets off a curse that threatens the lives of his friends if it is not stopped in time.

The film released in 2022 was nominated for the Goya Award for Best Animated Film at the 37th Goya Awards; and for the Platino Award for Best Animated Film at the 10th Platino Awards. It won the Best Animated Film award at the 15th Gaudí Awards and at the 78th CEC Awards.

=== Tad and the Magic Lamp (2026) ===
Tad, Sara, and their friends come across the genie in the magic lamp that, upon a wish made by Mummy, takes them back in time.

The film was released on 26 August 2026 in Spain.

== Accolades ==
Tad Stones film series at the Goya Awards
Category	Short films		Feature films		
Category	20th Goya Awards	22nd Goya Awards	27th Goya Awards	32nd Goya Awards	37th Goya Awards
Category	Tadeo Jones	Tadeo Jones and the Basement of Doom	Tad, the Lost Explorer	Tad, the Lost Explorer and the Secret of King Midas	Tad, the Lost Explorer and the Emerald Tablet
Best Animated Short Film	Won	Won			
Best Animated Film			Won	Won	Nominated
New Director			Won (Note: Laureate: Enrique Gato.)		
Best Adapted Screenplay			Won (Note: Laureate: Javier Barreira, Gorka Magallón, Ignacio del Moral, Jordi Gasull, and Neil Landau.)		
Best Original Score			Nominated (Note: Nominee: Álex Martínez and Zacarías M. de la Riva.)		
Best Original Song			Nominated (Note: Nominee: "Te voy a esperar" by Juan Magán.)		
