= Superlópez =

Fictional character

- Created by: Jan

Publication information
- Publisher: Editorial Bruguera; Ediciones B
- Original language: Spanish
- Genre: Humor/comedy, superhero
- Publication date: 1973–2022

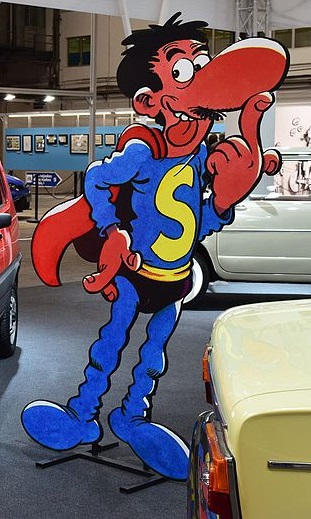
Superlópez

Superlópez is a Spanish comic book character created by Jan. Created in 1973, Superlópez is a parody of Superman. Born Jo-Con-Él (translated as Damn-with-him) on the planet Chitón (Spanish slang meaning something like Shut up!) much like Superman's home planet of Krypton, he leaves his planet when he enters a spaceship and presses a button, an accident that sends him to Earth. He was raised by adoptive parents in Barcelona and concealed himself under the identity of office-worker Juan López (which is actually author Jan's real name). He works with his girlfriend, the bad-tempered Luisa Lanas, the not-so-pally Jaime González Lidenbrock; and his demanding, unnamed boss.

This was revealed in the 8-page origin story in the first issue of his magazine. Other stories in the first issue reveal his "Fortress of Solitude", the "Villa Soledad" in the Arctic and have him fighting a rubber robot, the Galactic Gladiator, a sorceress from another dimension, La Incredible Maza (The Incredible Hulk), an atomic monster and a metal robot.

Other recurring characters include Inspector Hólmez (a reference to Sherlock Holmes), an excessively bureaucratic police officer who suspects everyone; Martha Hólmez, the Inspector's daughter, and computer geek Chico Humitsec.

== Editorial career ==
=== Euredit (1973) ===
In 1973, cartoonist Juan López Fernández "Jan" was commissioned to produce a book of very short comic strips parodying Superman. Antonio Martín, then editorial director of the comic book area of the Barcelona publisher Euredit and responsible for the commission, had to convince Jan -who did not consider himself a comedian- to do the job, and he did it quickly, without much faith. The work was included in the collection Humor siglo XX, dedicated to the satire of characters from comic books, literature and American cinema, such as King Kong, Tarzan or Frankenstein. The comics had to be silent, printed in black and white and in a 48-page landscape format, so, to overcome these creative restrictions, the author resorted to all kinds of graphic resources, such as thought snacks, kinetic signs or accentuation of expressions, with which he achieved great expressiveness in his drawings.

Jan conceived his parody of Superman in the manner of an ordinary Spaniard, "in the key of a tacky marriage" because it seemed to him to be the closest thing to the public at the time. This character, faced with the daily difficulties that he cannot solve and which frustrate him, adopts as an escape valve the tactic of imagining that he is a superhero. The jokes corresponding to this volume, traced with Rotring lines on sheets of folio paper and with an extension of up to four vignettes, have a simple and expressive line drawing, and present -despite the limitations of the format and the fact that they maintain little connection or continuity between them- effect gags on Superman, rather "domestic" mute jokes, which have little to do with the character later developed in the Superlópez comics of Ediciones B.

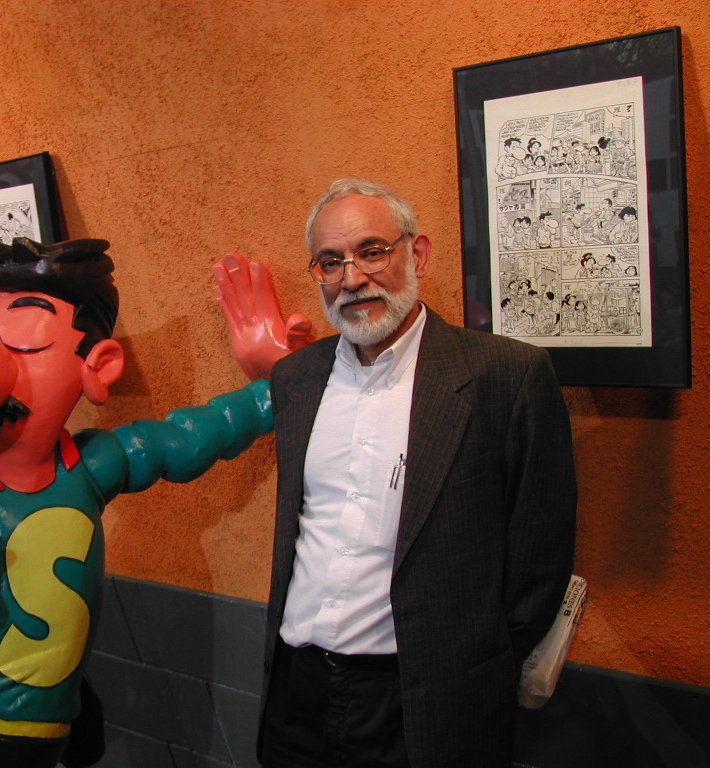
Creator Jan (2003)

== Recurring villains ==
Recurring villains include the evil professor Escariano Avieso; Lady Araña (“Lady Spider”); the gangster Al Trapone (a reference to Al Capone; he is accompanied by goons like Carasucia, Caracortada, Carapincho, gun-wielding Pistolet, etc.); and the mob boss Refuller D'Abastos.

== El Supergrupo (The Supergroup) ==
In Issue No. 2 and 3 (“El Supergrupo”), Superlópez served as a member of a group of superheroes, all of which were Jan's creations. These included El Mago (The Wizard, a parody of Dr. Strange); Capitán Hispania (Captain Spain, a parody of Captain America); Latas (Tin-guy, a parody of Iron Man); Bruto (The Brute, a parody of The Thing); and la Chica Increíble (Incredible Girl, a parody of the token generic superheroine). These spent more time fighting one another over the leadership of the Supergrupo than fighting evil (a parody or reference from the internecine strife that is part of Spain's history). They also made a short appearance in issue 6 where instead of going after the outlawed Superlopez, they argue then fight each other. The Supergroup come back in book 63, where a scientist is altering reality. In book 69, the Supergrupo meet Los Ligiones Justicieros, DC's JLA, featuring parodies of Superman, Batman, Wonder Woman, Green Lantern and Aquaman.

Superlópez began his career as a half-page comic strip without text then whole page strips with text where things for López normally ended up badly (reprinted in issue 13, The Genesis of Superlópez), before expanding into full albums which were later put together into annuals holding a number of issues, with adventures involving supervillains and criminal organizations, later evolving into longer, more complex stories concerning social topics affecting contemporary Spain (drug dealing and youth, political issues, pollution and environmental threats, etc.). Original writer Efepé (pseudonym of Francisco Pérez Navarro) left the character after the early issues and, from that point on, artist Jan took over the writing as well.

== Other storylines ==
Juan travels around the world after stories with Luisa and Jaime and encounters lost races, treasures and so on. He also encountered assorted aliens, monsters, robots, mad scientists, wars, Aztec gods and even had a trip to Hell. The stories are full of gags with him burning his large nose whenever he uses heat vision, of him getting a bump on the head when Luisa hits him, of him hurting his fist when he hits a metal robot. As well as bees, odd-looking little yellow creatures feature in the background in some panels and are revealed as ectoplasms in the "Los Petisos Carambanales" story. He even becomes a popstar and meets the ghost of the Prado Museum. Nothing was too way out for the strips as the characters went from one crazy scenario to another.

Often Superlópez not only parodies Superman but also popular literature. This is the case in El Señor de los Chupetes ("Lord of the Pacifiers", a parody for The Lord of the Rings) or Al centro de la Tierra (after Jules Verne's A Journey to the Center of the Earth)

From the 1990s Superlópez adventures take place in real scenarios that are drawn using a realistic style. Famous buildings and monuments in Barcelona are often portrayed in detail, as well as those in other cities of Catalonia (Camprodon), Europe (Andorra, Grenoble, Bulgaria) or Japan. As an internal joke, Superlópez says once that his adventures are evolving into simple traveling guides.

Superlópez later often had science fiction stories like Tú, robot... (53) where an intelligent robot is created which then travels the world, unintentionally doing good and bad as it seeks to find out what it means to be human. Confronting the robot in the icy wastes, like in the original Frankenstein story, Superlópez is not sure what humanity is either. In El virus Frankenstein (56) a virus changes a young boy into a horrible monster while the El mundo de al lado (57) features a door to another dimension where maybe based on a Little Prince story, the people are enslaved into pulling huge wagons around the planet and Elecciones en Kaxim (58) feature him interfering in elections on a strange alien world. In book 62, Superlópez goes near a beam giant aliens use to cut planets up and his left arm is cut off at the elbow. It suddenly reattaches itself a few pages later and is normal again.

In book 64, "The Time Thief", Superlópez meets Doctor Who with his Tardis, the Daleks and the Cybermen. In book 66, the "super group" go to the Skroll (Marvel Skrulls) planet and also borrowed some of the story line from Fantastic Four 24 (March 1964). The book deals with hospital overcrowding too.

Later Superlópez books leave the caricaturesque tone of his first adventures to deal with current social issues: illegal drug trade, smuggling, tax haven, gunrunning in Africa, dictatorships, or illegal immigration in Europe are some later themes. Book 69 deals with the illegally built Algarrobico hotel in Almeria, southern Spain. Book 70 deals with Muslim radicalisation of youngsters and extremism, a subject few others dare to touch.

Jan announced he would finish to draw the character in 2022.

== Complete issues ==
1. Aventuras de Superlópez (1980)
2. El supergrupo (1980)
3. ¡Todos contra uno, uno contra todos! (1981)
4. Los alienígenas (1981)
5. El señor de los chupetes (1981)
6. La semana más larga... (1981)
7. Los cabecicubos (1983)
8. La caja de Pandora (1984)
9. La gran superproducción (1985)
10. Al centro de la Tierra (1987)
11. Cachabolik Blues Rock y El fantasma del museo del Prado (1988)
12. En el país de los juegos, el tuerto es el rey... (1988)
13. El génesis de Superlópez (1989)
14. El asombro del robot y Una vez, en una ciudad... (1989)
15. Los petisos carambanales y otras petisoperías (1989)
16. Los cerditos de Camprodón (1990)
17. Periplo búlgaro and El tesoro del conde Arnau (1990)
18. La banda del dragón despeinado (Yakuza) and La bomba (1990)
19. Hotel Pánico and La cosa del pantano, el flautista de Hamelín y otras soserías(1991)
20. Un camello subió al tranvía en Grenoble y el tranvía le está mordiendo la pierna (1991)
21. El tesoro de Ciuacoatl (1992)
22. Los ladrones de ozono (1992)
23. El castillo de arena (1993)
24. La aventura está en la esquina (1993)
25. Tyrannosaurus sect (1994)
26. Los gemelos Superlópez (1995)
27. La acera del tiempo (1995)
28. El infierno (1996)
29. Los gemelos Superlópez: Vamos a ver elefantes... (1996)
30. Los cybernautas (1997)
31. El supercrack (1997)
32. Las minas del rey Soplomón (1998)
33. 25 años de Superlópez (1999)
34. Otra vez lady Araña (1999)
35. La guerra de lady Araña (2000)
36. Adiós lady Araña (2000)
37. El dios del bit (2001)
38. El caserón fantasma (2002)
39. Nosotros los Papino (2002)
40. El gran botellón (2003)
41. El patio de tu casa es particular (2003)
42. Monster chapapote (2004)
43. Las montañas voladoras (2004)
44. Tras la persiana... (2005)
45. Gritad, gritad, malditos... (2005)
46. La casa amarilla (2006)
47. La feria de la muerte (2006)
48. Politono Hamelín (2007)
49. Hipotecarión (2007)
50. Iba caminando... (2007)
51. En busca del templo perdido... (2008)
52. La brújula esdrújula (2008)
53. Tú, robot... (2008)
54. La biblioteca inexistente (2009)
55. ¡A toda crisis! (2009)
56. El virus Frankestein (2010)
57. "El mundo de al lado" (2011)
58. "Elecciones en Kaxim" (2011)
59. "El Abejón Rey" (2011)
60. "Asesinato en el Toral Express" (2012)
61. "Asalto al museo" (2012)
62. "Los recorta planetas" (2013)
63. "Otra vez el Supergrupo" (2013)
64. "El ladrón del tiempo" (2013)
65. "El gran deshauciador" (2014)
66. "El supergrupo y la guerra de las latas" (2014)
67. "La montaña de diamantes" (2014)
68. "Tres pizzas y un muerto... (2015)
69. "El Supergrupo contra Los Demoledores" (2015)
70. "Mambrú se va a la guerra" (2015)
71. "En el laberinto" (2015)
72. "El Supergrupo contra los Ejecutivos" (2015)
73. "Gran auténtico vidente curandero" (2016)
74. "El trastero infinito" (2017)
75. "El Supergrupo contra el Papa Cósmico" (2017)
76. "Menguante"
77. "Nuevas aventuras de Mambrú" (2018)
78. "XXL" (2018)
79. "Robinson" (2018)
80. "La isla de basura" (2019)
81. "El secreto de la biblioteca" (2019)
82. "El bullying de las sorpresas" (2019)
83. "La invasión de los huertos vivientes" (2020)
84. "Los influyentes influencers" (2021)
85. "Sueños frikis" (2022)

== In other languages ==
- Catalan: Super Llopis (In Andorra: Superlópez)
- Danish: Superdan
- German: Super-Meier
- Norwegian: Superegon
- Swedish: Super Nilsson (Mentioned in a Spanish magazine, but not independently verified)

== Films ==
There is a 2003 short animation film named Superlópez contra el robot de bolsillo by Enrique Gato, the creator of Tadeo Jones. A feature length Spanish film Superlópez was released on November 23, 2018

== See also ==
- Superdupont (French equivalent)
