= Superlópez (2003 film) =

Spanish animated short film by Enrique Gato

Superlópez contra el robot de bolsillo
- Directed by: Enrique Gato
- Story by: Enrique Gato; JAN (Unaccredited)
- Produced by: Enrique Gato
- Release date: 2003 (Spain)
- Running time: 3 minutes
- Country: Spain
- Language: Spanish

Superlópez contra el robot de bolsillo (translated as Superlópez Against the Pocket Robot) is a 2003 Spanish animated short film directed by Enrique Gato, and based on JAN's comics, Superlópez.

Gato, fan of this comic series, wanted to make a homage at JAN work with a 3-minute computer-animated film; although he tried to make a long duration film, that wasn't possible.

The plot is about a battle on the street between the main character against a giant robot.

== Production ==
Gato tried to design the character by himself for make a few seconds animatics, although he tried making an adaptation as a designer before. When he began writing the script, Gato tried to get a story (not very complicated) what the fans would like, so he divided the movie in six steps: prologue, Superlópez appears, enemy appears, both fight, ending and epilogue.

== Reception ==
JAN gave Gato his permission to make the project. Despite admitting that he won't make the film by selfishness, has a strong friendship with the cartoonist. After watching the short, JAN made a positive review.

== Bibliography ==
- G. Calvo, Antonio (2008). 10 entrevistas en corto. X semana del cortometraje.
- REGUEIRA, Tino (2005). Guía visual de la Editorial Bruguera (1940-1988). Barcelona: Ediciones Glénat S. L. ISBN 84-8449-664-3. Depósito Legal: B-2551-05.
