= Tad, The Lost Explorer =

Tad, the Lost Explorer
- Spanish theatrical release poster
- Spanish: Las Aventuras de Tadeo Jones
- Directed by: Enrique Gato
- Screenplay by: Javier Barreira; Gorka Magallón; Ignacio del Moral; Jordi Gasull; Neil Landau
- Based on: Tadeo Jones y el secreto de Toactlum by Javier Barreira & Gorka Magallón; Tadeo Jones by Enrique Gato
- Produced by: Jordi Gasull; Nicolás Matji; Edmon Roch; Alvaro Augustin; Ghislain Barrois; Ezequiel Nieto; Cesar Vargas
- Starring: Kerry Shale; Ariel Winter; Bruce Mackinnon; Mac McDonald; Liza Ross; Cheech Marin; Adam James
- Edited by: Alexander Adams
- Music by: Zacarías M. de la Riva
- Production companies: Telecinco Cinema; El Toro Pictures; Lightbox Entertainment; Ikiru Films; Telefónica Studios; Media Networks
- Distributed by: Paramount Pictures (Spain, Mexico, Latin America and Brazil); StudioCanal (international)
- Release dates: 8 April 2012 (United States); 5 June 2012 (AIAFF); 31 August 2012 (Spain)
- Running time: 92 minutes
- Country: Spain
- Languages: Spanish; English
- Budget: €8 million
- Box office: €45 million ($60.8 million)

Tad, the Lost Explorer (Spanish: Las aventuras de Tadeo Jones, lit. 'The Adventures of Tadeo Jones') is a 2012 Spanish animated adventure comedy film directed by Enrique Gato. The film is a spinoff of Gato's 2004 short film, Tadeo Jones and its sequel Tadeo Jones and the Basement of Doom. While technically based on the shorts, the film was mainly adapted from the Spanish graphic novel Tadeo and the Secret of the Toactlum, illustrated and co-written by Juan López Fernández (Jan) and written by Javier Barreira, Gorka Magallón, and Gato. The film was adapted and written by Barreira, Magallón, Ignacio del Moral, Jordi Gasull, and Neil Landau. The film's music was composed by Zacarías M. de la Riva. The English cast features the voices of Kerry Shale, Ariel Winter, Bruce Mackinnon, Mac McDonald, Liza Ross, Cheech Marin, and Adam James. The film was produced by Telecinco Cinema, El Toro Picture, Lightbox Entertainment, Ikiru Films, Telefónica Producciones, and Media Networks, with the participation of AXN, Canal Plus, and TVC.

The film premiered at the Annecy International Animation Film Festival on 5 June 2012 and was theatrically released on 31 August 2012 in Spain by Paramount Pictures. Spanish critics gave it positive reviews, but it was not well received in North America. It earned €45 million on an €8 million budget, making it a box-office hit.

It was nominated for five Goya Awards at the 27th Goya Awards, winning three: Best Animated Film, New Director, and Best Adapted Screenplay.

It became the first feature film in the Tad Stones film series when a sequel film, titled Tad, the Lost Explorer and the Secret of King Midas, was released in 2017; which was followed by Tad, the Lost Explorer and the Emerald Tablet, released in August 2022; and Tad and the Magic Lamp, released in August 2026.

== Plot ==
Tadeo Jones is a bricklayer who lives in Chicago, working on the construction of the city's subway. Ever since he was five years old, he has dreamed of being a professional archaeologist. After being fired from his job as a bricklayer for daydreaming and for his dog urinating on the construction foreman, Tad visits his friend Professor Humbert, asking for the professor's help in investigating an apparently vintage bottle of Coca-Cola Tad found on the construction site. The professor receives a letter from his friend Professor Lavrof summoning him to Peru to re-unite his half of a stone "key" that will unlock the legendary Incan city of Paititi. Arriving at the airport, Professor Humbert suffers an accident after taking the wrong pills and is taken to the hospital. Meanwhile, a member of the nefarious firm Odysseus Inc. is spying on them and sends the photo to the other members who are in the Sechura Desert.

Tad takes the professor's place and, along with his dog Jeff, travels from Chicago to Cusco, Peru. In the Cusco airport, Tad meets Freddy, a local hustler. Tad is kidnapped by men from Odysseus, who threaten him to give them the stone key, but Tad is saved by Freddy and Sara, Professor Lavrof's daughter, whom Tad falls in love with. After joining the two halves of the key, the group travels to Machu Picchu to meet up with Lavrof. Odysseus Inc., led by the evil Kopponen, again tries to steal the key, but Tad and Sara escape their clutches.

Arriving in Machu Picchu, they discover that Professor Lavrof was kidnapped by Odysseus. After a series of adventures, they find Lavrof and Max Mordon, a famous archaeologist Tad idolizes and Sara's fiancé. After cracking the code of a wall map, Kopponen searches the desert with Lavrof and Mordon to find the treasure of the Incas. But Tad and Sara have the real map, and they depart for the jungle. Kopponen discovers them and finds the underground temple.

After more adventures, it is revealed that Max is in league with Odysseus. After a booby-trapped room that wipes out Kopponen and the rest of his henchmen in Odysseus Inc., Max sneaks into a room in the temple and tries to steal the Incan gold, thinking it will grant him eternal life. After deceiving a mummy and a golem, Max smashes the glass that protects the Incan gold and thus achieves eternal life — but only as an un-dead mummy, and the condition is irreversible. Max is then imprisoned by the mummy inhabitants in Paititi's darkest dungeon, the chief mummy releases Tad, Sara and the Professor on the condition that they will not reveal anything they know about the city or the treasure. Upon returning to the surface, they convince Freddy that the treasure of the Incas was only a legend and does not really exist. Tad and Sara confess their feelings for each other, along with the passionate kiss, their romance blossoms.

The film ends with Tad, Sara, Lavrof, Jeff, and Belzoni escaping in one of the Odysseus vehicles.

== Cast ==
Character	Spanish voice actor	English voice actor
Tadheus "Tad" Stone/Tadeo Jones	Óscar Barberán	Kerry Shale
Sara Lavrof	Michelle Jenner	Ariel Winter (US); Fiona Glascott (UK)
Freddy	José Mota	Cheech Marin (US); Lewis MacLeod (UK)
Max Mordon	Pep Anton Muñoz	Adam James
Professor Humbert	Carles Canut	Mac McDonald
Professor Lavrof	Félix Benito	Mac McDonald
The Mummy	Luis Posada	Bruce Mackinnon
Kopponen	Miguel Ángel Jenner	Kerry Shale
Grandma	Marta Martorell	Liza Ross

== Production ==
Tad, the Lost Explorer was produced by Lightbox Entertainment, Telecinco Cinema, El Toro Pictures, Telefónica Producciones, and Ikiru Films, and co-produced by Media Networks. It was distributed by the Spanish subsidiary of Paramount Pictures, in collaboration with AXN, Televisió de Catalunya, Grupo Intereconomía, Mediaset España, and Canal+. The film became the first full-length animated feature with these characters, originally introduced in Enrique Gato's short animations.

In 2001, Enrique Gato decided to create a new character, parodying Indiana Jones, to add a touch of humor as well as greater action and dynamism to his work and counter the static character movement of his earlier short film, Bicho. Work on the project did not start until two years later, when he began writing the script for the big screen.

The Tadeo character was created using the 3D computer graphics program Autodesk 3ds Max. The model was initially very simple, created as a facial animation test with 4 basic gestures. The director saw in the character the potential to become a short film protagonist. For the second short film, Enrique Gato wanted to convey something of the personal life of the character, not present in the first film, showing his neighbourhood and his taste for hamburgers.

David García voiced the character in the first short film, in which Tadeo Jones does not speak but utters exclamations and murmurs. The character does speak in the second short film, where he is voiced by Jordi Brau. In the first animated feature film, Las aventuras de Tadeo Jones (Tad, the Lost Explorer), the Spanish voice actors are José Mota, Michelle Jenner, and Óscar Barberan as Freddy, Sara and Tadeo respectively. In the version dubbed in Catalan, José Corbacho replaces José Mota.

In April 2008, the filmmakers set up their own animation studio, Lightbox Entertainment, to produce 3D animated films for the global market. They began making Tad, the Lost Explorer from that time, featuring the protagonist, Tad, as a construction worker who devotes his spare time to archeology. Spanish comic book writer and artist Juan López Fernández (known as Jan) made two cartoons to promote the feature film starring Tad, which were used as storyboards. Enrique Gato also tried to take the character into video games, but abandoned the idea when results fell short of expectations.

The elongated nose, big mouth, and disproportionate limbs of the Tadeo Jones character are based on Jan's designs. The figure is principally inspired by Indiana Jones, as seen by his hat and his silhouette with its pale shirt and dark pants. But, he carries a backpack, giving him a boy-scout air that symbolizes his childlike mentality.

The character was animated using three forms based on the same geometric shape, one fully clothed, one without hat and shirt, and one wearing only boots and underwear. The animation was done in Character Studio, without adapting the volume of the components. The head is separate, the eyes also had their own independent geometry, and there were specific controls for the eyelids. One difficulty was that the filmmakers did not want the character to lose his hat until the end of the short animation, and the hat reduced the expressiveness of the character. For that reason, they first animated Tadeo without the hat, adapting the character afterwards with his hat on. The animation team, comprising David Ordieres and some one hundred other film employees, spent four years developing and animating the characters.

== Release ==
The film premiered at the Annecy International Animated Film Festival on 5 June 2012 and was theatrically released on 31 August 2012 in Spain by Paramount Pictures, who additionally distributed the film in territories like Mexico and Brazil.

The film was released in Spain on 19 December 2012 on DVD and Blu-ray, and within days became the best selling Christmas DVD, drying up the issue quickly. Includes audio quality Dolby Digital 5.1, Spanish version in addition to blind, and language in Catalan. It also concludes a section of extras from the movie with the making of, the trailer, video clip, short films, and the design and creation of characters.

It was also released on DVD and Blu-ray in the United Kingdom on November 10, 2014, by StudioCanal, who also handled the film's international sales.

== Soundtrack ==
Tad, the Lost Explorer

Soundtrack album by Zacarías M. de la Riva
- Released: 12 September 2012
- Recorded: 2012
- Genre: Film score
- Length: 55:27
- Label: MovieScore Media
- Producer: James Peterson

Zacarías M. de la Riva film scores chronology
Childish Games (2012)	Tad, the Lost Explorer (2012)	La mano de Nefertiti (2012)

Singles from Tad, the Lost Explorer
- 1. "Te Voy A Esperar" Released: 7 August 2012

The soundtrack of the film is composed by Zacarías M. de la Riva. The movie's theme is "Te Voy A Esperar" by Juan Magan and Belinda, which plays in the credits. The song placed first on the charts in Spain on iTunes and Spotify. On the other hand, the soundtrack of the film also features songs from One Direction and The Monomes, as well as the hit song "The Final Countdown" by Europe. The score soundtrack was released by MovieScore Media on 12 September 2012.

== Video games ==
A video game based on the film, titled Tadeo Jones, was developed by Spanish studio U-Play Studios for the PlayStation Vita. It was released by Deep Silver on 4 December 2013. A follow-up game, Tadeo Jones and the Lost Manuscript (Tadeo Jones y el Manuscrito Perdido), was released on 28 November 2014 for PlayStation Vita and PlayStation 4.

== Reception ==
=== Critical response ===
The film generally received positive reviews mainly from Spanish critics and audiences praising the animation, action scenes, Gato's direction, and cast of characters. Fausto Fernández of the Spanish film magazine Fotogramas gave it three out of five stars. He called Tad, the Lost Explorer "the best film in Spanish animation history" and praised its visual quality and cast of characters, although he criticized the choice of soundtrack. He added that, "as a film deriving from cartoons, it stood up well against bigger-budget titles." Carmen L. Lobo of the newspaper La Razón gave it three out of five, calling it "a candid story, furiously-paced and strongly influenced by comics, yet stripped of any malicious double meaning." She described it "as full of scenes that seem lifted from a video game, adding that the settings in which these unfold are impressive." Jordi Batlle Caminal of La Vanguardia wrote of the film: "The animation is top notch. The secondary characters are inventively designed [...] A worthy product, with a blockbuster soul." He gave it a score of three out of four.

In North America, Tad, the Lost Explorer was not well received from critics and audiences. Grace Montgomery of Common Sense Media rated the film two stars out of five, describing it "lame adventure feels like a low-budget version of a movie […]." She also reviewed about the action sequences "borrow heavily" from Indiana Jones, "the bad guy does a bad Arnold Schwarzenegger impression," and the characters are "pretty one-dimensional." She also noted that the film focuses on plot development and "less on showing the bad guys waving guns around, which starts to feel pretty excessive by the end of the movie."

=== Box office performance ===
Tad, the Lost Explorer was made on a budget of €8 million. It earned €45 million ($60.8 million) worldwide. In Spain, where it was released by Paramount Pictures in 500 theaters, the film held the number one spot at the box office for five weeks in a row, and earned a total of €18.0 million ($24.4 million), breaking domestic box office records for a Spanish-animated feature. It became the highest-grossing film of the year in Spain, and outgrossed other animated features, including Ice Age: Continental Drift, Madagascar 3: Europe's Most Wanted (another animated film distributed by Paramount), and Brave. In other countries, the film earned over $36 million, topping box office charts in multiple South American territories.

=== Accolades ===
Award	Ceremony	Category	Result
Forqué Awards	22 January 2013	Best Documentary and/or Animation	Won
Gaudí Awards	3 February 2013	Best Animated Film	Won
Gaudí Awards	3 February 2013	Best Sound	Nominated
Gaudí Awards	3 February 2013	Best Special/Digital Effects	Won
CEC Medals	11 February 2013	Best Animated Film	Won
CEC Medals	11 February 2013	Best New Director	Won
CEC Medals	11 February 2013	Best Adapted Screenplay	Won
CEC Medals	11 February 2013	Best Music	Nominated
Goya Awards	17 February 2013	Best Animated Film	Won
Goya Awards	17 February 2013	New Director	Won
Goya Awards	17 February 2013	Best Adapted Screenplay	Won
Goya Awards	17 February 2013	Best Original Score	Nominated
Goya Awards	17 February 2013	Best Original Song	Nominated

== Sequels ==
A sequel, titled Tad the Lost Explorer and the Secret of King Midas, was released in 2017. It was co-directed by Enrique Gato and David Alonso, and written by Jordi Gasull, Javier Barreira and Neil Landau. It was distributed worldwide by Paramount Pictures.

The second sequel titled Tad, the Lost Explorer and the Emerald Tablet was released in August 2022 and was directed by Enrique Gato.

The third sequel titled, Tad and the Magic Lamp, was theatrically released in Spain on 26 August 2026 by Paramount Pictures, and directed by Enrique Gato.

== See also ==
- List of Spanish films of 2012
