= Capture the Flag (film) =

Animated comedy film

- Theatrical release poster
- Spanish: Atrapa la bandera
- Directed by: Enrique Gato
- Written by: Jordi Gasull; Javier Barreira; Neil Landau
- Produced by: Álvaro Augustín; Ignacio Fernández-Veiga; Jordi Gasull; Axel Kuschevatzky; Nicolás Matji; Edmon Roch
- Starring: Lorraine Pilkington; Phillippa Alexander; Rasmus Hardiker; Sam Fink; Paul Kelleher; Derek Siow; Andrew Hamblin
- Edited by: Alexander Adams
- Music by: Diego Navarro
- Production companies: 4 CATS Pictures; Lightbox Entertainment; Los Rockets AIE La Película; Telecinco Cinema; Telefonica Studios; Ikiru Films
- Distributed by: Paramount Pictures
- Release date: 28 August 2015
- Running time: 94 minutes
- Country: Spain
- Language: English
- Budget: $12.5 million
- Box office: $24.6 million

Capture the Flag (also known as Atrapa la Bandera in Spanish) is a 2015 Spanish animated science-fiction adventure comedy film directed by Enrique Gato and written by Patxi Amezcua. Produced by 4 Cats Pictures and animated by Lightbox Entertainment, the film was distributed worldwide by Paramount Pictures, which was a milestone for Spanish cinema, as this was the first time a major Hollywood studio acquired and agreed to distribute two Spanish animated films worldwide (not just one, like most other films), with the other one being Tad the Lost Explorer and the Secret of King Midas. The film takes place in the present alternate times of the year 2015, and the storyline is about Mike Goldwing, a 12-year-old surfer who embarks on a journey with his friends to disrupt a billionaire's plan to destroy the American flag planted on the Moon.

The film received some mixed reviews from few American critics and was well received by most Spanish critics and audiences. The American setting had polarizing reception while the animation, action scenes, voice acting, music score, and themes were generally praised. The film won Best Animated Film at the 2016 Goya Awards.

Though released first in Spain, Capture the Flag was animated to the English voice cast first and dubbed into Spanish and Catalan in post-production.

== Plot ==
12-year-old Mike Goldwing is the son and grandson of NASA astronauts. His grandfather Frank lives his days estranged from the family after missing out on his big chance to fly to the Moon with the Apollo 11 mission.

Texan billionaire Richard Carson III wants to claim ownership of the Moon in order to mine its vast resources of Helium-3. To bolster his claim, Carson promotes the false rumor that the original Moon landing was faked in a studio. Next, Carson plans to fly to the Moon and destroy the only concrete evidence: the American flag planted by the Apollo 11 astronauts.

The President of the United States orders NASA to plan another space flight to the Moon to beat Carson. Upon hearing the news, Carson hires a saboteur to stop the mission.

Mike decides to go to the Moon as a stowaway. Mike, along with his friends Marty and Amy and Marty's pet iguana Igor, tries to sneak inside the launch area, but Marty gets caught after being attacked by alligators in the marshes surrounding Kennedy Space Center Launch Complex 39. As the mission commander, Mike's grandfather Frank is called to the scene. When Carson's operative causes the rocket to launch much earlier than planned, Mike, Amy, Igor and Frank blast off to the Moon with Carson on their trail.

The trio capture the flag. Amy links her phone camera to the antenna while Carson reveals his evil plans to them, and consequently the world. Realizing that he would still win if he got back to Earth, they stop him by sabotaging his futuristic Helium-3 mines.

Mike learns that Frank had been ruled out of the first mission because he had caught chicken pox from his son Scott. Frank at first blamed Scott for him missing out on such a great opportunity to go to space, but he then realized that it was not Scott's fault and he was a failure for blaming it on his own son. Feeling guilty about this, Frank decided to leave his family, declaring that Scott would be better off without him.

Mike, Amy, and Igor are chased by Carson and escape through Moon's rock cliffs by using rocket spare parts as surf boards and manage to destroy his entire rocket and workshop with the help of Marty's communication rocket to survive the explosion.

After planting the flag back in its place, they all return safely to Earth with Mike's plans to reunite his family. Grandfather Frank reconciles with his son and the three travelers are hailed as heroes, and Amy is also proud to be headlined the first female on the moon.

In mid-credits, Carson is revealed to have survived the explosion, floating on the space, and his minion Gigs is revealed to be a robot that was created by Gags, who was accidentally killed by Carson earlier, and they both are stuck with the annoying robot with using a Helium-3 battery.

== Cast ==
Character	English actor	Spanish dub actor
Mike Goldwing	Lorraine Pilkington	Carme Calvell
Scott Goldwing	Adam James	Toni Mora
Frank Goldwing	Paul Kelleher	Camilo García
Samantha Goldwing	Philippa Alexander	Marta Barbarà
Tess	Philippa Alexander	Margarita Cavero
Amy González	Philippa Alexander	Michelle Jenner
Jack Farr	Bryan Bounds	Ramon Canals
Marty Farr	Rasmus Hardiker	Javier Balas
Richard Carson III	Sam Fink	Dani Rovira
Steve Gigs	Derek Siow	Fernando Cabrera
Bill Gags	Andrew Hamblin	Xavier Casan

== Production ==
After the successful reception of the previous film Tad, The Lost Explorer, Enrique and his crew thought of an interesting concept regarding exploration on the Moon based on the conspiracy theories to the NASA and the Apollo missions, along with the themes of family and broken dreams regarding NASA space missions. The heads loved the idea and started greenlighting the project by crafting the script based on the elements with writer Jordi Gasull, who was also a great collector of space objects.

The Lightbox team visited NASA's space centers in Houston, and Cape Canaveral for documentation and visual references, with guidance from some members of the station. Astronaut Michael López-Alegría guided and advised the film crew at the NASA facility. "He told us many details about what some protocols are like, the launch of the rockets, the machinery of the ships ...", explains Enrique Gato. Another of the advisers was veteran astronaut Alan Bean, the fourth man to walk on the Moon. He did it on the next mission, Apollo XII, in November 1969. "He gave us details of what it was like to step on the Moon, how to get there in the last phases ... It helped us to be as faithful as possible", said the director.

Visiting NASA was especially helpful for the animators as they needed to know the textures of many surfaces. In the space agency, they were surprised that they were dedicated to photographing "a piece of telephone or the ground", revealed the scriptwriter Jordi Gasull in the presentation of the film. In the movie, they also used a member of the team as a reference to get an idea of the height of things. His name is Galo, so the team started talking about measures such as "half a Gallic", "three-quarters of a Gallic" or "two Gauls". The team also thought about including in the story the resource Helium 3, an isotope that could be a source of clean nuclear energy. This element actually exists and it is rare on Earth but abundant on the Moon, giving more motivation to the villain Richard Carson.

For the animation, it used a digital combination of 3D animation with Adobe After Effects (visual effects), Autodesk Maya (computer animation), Mental Ray (rendering), Nuke (compositing) and ZBrush (sculpting). Every ten seconds of film and animation required a week of work, specifically for this movie production. This time, the artists also were determined in updating the elements of real hair when modeling the characters.

The biggest challenge for the riggers - those in charge of giving movement to the characters - was the design of Igor, the chameleon that accompanies the children on their adventure, along with the application of various mechanical gadgets in his backbox.

For Enrique Gato, the greatest difficulty laid in the animation of Frank, the grandfather who had a certain obsession with getting a character that had the acting characteristics of Clint Eastwood, even as a reference, that conveys incredible emotions without moving a muscle on his face. Other character designs for the movie were mostly modeled and parodically named as references to real-life people and animated characters from Pixar, including Richard Carson as a reference to Richard Branson, his assistants Bill Gags and Steve Gigs to Bill Gates and Steve Jobs, and the Goldwing family members Samantha and little Tess were visual references to the mother Helen Parr (Mrs. Incredible) from The Incredibles and Boo from Monsters, Inc..

Other animated references put on the film included a black and white clip faking an outtake of the Apollo 11 arrival with a janitor impersonating a filmmaker as a parody to Stanley Kubrick, and another scene when Mike and Amy floating around eating candy through the rocket as a reference to The Simpsons 1994 episode Deep Space Homer.

== Release ==
The movie premiered on August 26 at a special blue carpet event in Spain and eventually a special screen premiere at Houston's NASA center, making it the first international film and first animated film to be released in the NASA theater screening.

=== Box office ===
Capture the Flag opened in 20 United States theaters on 4 December 2015 and earned $6,690 in its three days of release. The film grossed $12,481,312 in Spain and $4,178,905 elsewhere for a worldwide total of $24,604,331.

=== Reception ===
The film has received a 46% rating on Rotten Tomatoes, based on the 24 reviews and an average rating of 4.9/10. While it was positively received by most critics and audiences in Spain, it barely gathered mixed results in other places like the USA due to lack of viewership from many other critics. However, Variety praised the film for being a solid piece of family entertainment, even though agreed that it doesn't exactly have the same high standard as other blockbuster hits like Pixar or other Hollywood movies, considering it as a movie that "kids and adults can enjoy the space-race adventure in this entertaining Spanish-produced animated feature", even additionally praising Gato's direction and the humoristic references.

=== Home media ===
The film was released on DVD on March 1, 2016. It was eventually available on Netflix in North America, but it was taken out shortly afterwards. However, it remained available on the service in Spain and later began streaming on Disney+ from the Spanish platform.

== See also ==
- List of Spanish films of 2015
