= Tad, the Lost Explorer and the Secret of King Midas =

2017 Spanish animated adventure comedy film

- Theatrical release poster
- Spanish: Tadeo Jones 2: El secreto del Rey Midas
- Directed by: Enrique Gato; David Alonso
- Screenplay by: Jordi Gasull; Nicolas Matji; Edmon Roch
- Produced by: Gorka Magallón; Javier Barreira; Jordi Gasull; Ignacio del Moral; Neil Landau
- Starring: Óscar Barberán; Michelle Jenner; José Corbacho; Adriana Ugarte; Miguel Ángel Jenner
- Music by: Zacarías M. de la Riva
- Production companies: Paramount Animation; Ikiru Films; Telecinco Cinema; El Toro Pictures; 4 CATS Pictures; Lightbox Entertainment; Tadeo Jones y el Secreto de Midas AIE; Telefónica Studios
- Distributed by: Paramount Pictures
- Release dates: June 13, 2017 (Annecy); August 25, 2017 (Spain)
- Running time: 85 minutes
- Country: Spain
- Language: Spanish
- Budget: €9 million
- Box office: $35.7 million

Tad, the Lost Explorer and the Secret of King Midas (Spanish: Tadeo Jones 2: El secreto del Rey Midas) is a 2017 Spanish animated adventure comedy film directed by Enrique Gato and David Alonso. Produced by Ikiru Films, Telecinco Cinema, El Toro Pictures, Lightbox Entertainment and Telefónica Studios, it is the second film in the Tad Stones franchise, a sequel to Tad, the Lost Explorer (2012).

The film had its world premiere at the Annecy International Animation Film Festival on 13 June 2017 and was theatrically released on 25 August 2017 in Spain by Paramount Pictures and was also released in the US on 1 December 2017, and in the UK on 9 February 2018 It had a worldwide gross of $35 million against a budget of €9 million ($11.8 million) making it a box office success. Like the first film, Tad the Lost Explorer and the Secret of King Midas received some negative reviews from American critics, but was very well received by Spanish critics, who even considered it superior to the first film. It won Best Animated Film at the 32nd Goya Awards, 5th Platino Awards, 73rd CEC Awards and 10th Gaudí Awards.

A third installment Tad, the Lost Explorer and the Emerald Tablet, was released in 2022, and a fourth instalment Tad and the Magic Lamp, was released in 2026.

== Plot ==
Sometime after the events of the first film, Sara Lavrof had become an expeditioner. One day, she obtains a papyrus that proves the existence of King Midas at an underwater temple. The next day, she invites Tad Stones to an museum. Before his visit, he is reunited by the mummy, who explains that he was expelled from his home town, Paititi, and he set out to Tad's home city. Arriving at the museum, Tad meets Tiffany Maze, an assistant of Professor Lavrof, who is learning a lot about Sara. Sara tells him about Midas' gold collar made up of three pieces that enable Midas' gold touch, and about the location of one of the pieces, the Red Temple of Baal.

At a gala in the museum that night, during a presentation of the papyrus, the event is disrupted by Jack Rackham and his henchmen, who steal the papyrus and abduct Sara, interrogating her about the locations of the pieces. Tad, Tiffany, and Mummy decipher a writing about the Temple of Baal from a notebook, and realize that Jack is taking Sara to Granada.

Upon arrival, they hitch a taxi ride to Alhambra, where they are chased by some of Jack's henchmen, but they escape to the palace. There, they open an secret passage leading to Baal's temple hidden under a fountain, where they enter. Inside, they acquire the first piece of the collar. Upon returning to the surface, they are cornered by Jack, who forces them to surrender the piece and the notebook in exchange for Sara. Tad reconciles with her, before the group set off to Cappadocia, Turkey.

They reach a palace, but Tad decides to enter alone. He acquires the second piece, and discovers a mountain that resembles Midas' symbol, learning that Midas built it for Apollo. However, Sara decides to destroy the pieces upon finding the final piece as she leaves to go to the mountain, while Tiffany gives the piece to Jack, deciding to join him. Realizing that he shouldn't have left her, Tad and Mummy follow her to the mountain. Everyone reaches the interior, and Jack opens a tomb containing the last piece, before connecting all the pieces together, giving Midas' ability.

During a struggle, Jack turns Sara into gold with his powers, before Tad defeats him. Realizing that he should have destroyed the collar, Tad tearfully mourns over her. However, his love restores her, hence a sacrifice for love. Back at his home, everyone celebrates, while Tad and Sara embrace and share a kiss.

== Voice cast ==
- Óscar Barberán as Tadeo "Tad" Jones
- Michelle Jenner as Sara Lavrof
- Luis Posada as Mummy
- Adriana Ugarte as Tiffany Maze
- Miguel Ángel Jenner as Jack Rackham
- Trevor White as Tad Stones (English version)
- Alex Kelly as Sara Lavrof (English version)
- Joseph Balderrama as Mummy/Construction Worker (English version)
- Gemma Whelan as Tiffany Maze/Henchwoman (English version)
- Ramon Tikaram as Jack Rackham (English version)
- Lewis MacLeod as Taxi Driver (English Version)

== Production ==
Fountain of the lions of the Alhambra of Granada, where one of the scenes takes place. Telecinco Cinema proposed a sequel to the film. The director from Valladolid Enrique Gato, responsible for the film, continues to rely on the script written by Gorka Magallón, Javier Barreira, Jordi Gasull, Ignacio del Moral, and Neil Landau.

In May 2013, during his visit to the Valladolid Book Fair, Gato took the opportunity to talk to the press about his upcoming projects. The creator of Tadeo, revealed that "the team of scriptwriters is in the pre-production phase." However, he explained that before Tadeo 2, he is preparing what will be his second feature film, Capture the Flag, which is scheduled for release in late 2014.

The film was released in Spain on August 25, 2017. David Bisbal and Tini Stoessel perform the film's single, titled "Todo es posible."

The symphonic soundtrack is composed and orchestrated by Zacarías M. de la Riva, who received a historic Goya nomination in 2013 for the music for Tad, the Lost Explorer, the first animated film to be nominated in this category. The soundtrack is by Tenerife-born composer and conductor Diego Navarro, and was performed by the Tenerife Symphony Orchestra. This composer was also the creator of the soundtrack for "Capture the Flag."

As of March 2018, the film has grossed €19,932,203 and has been seen by 3,231,923 viewers in Spain. Abroad, the film grossed €1,968,077.

== Release ==
The film had its world premiere at the Annecy International Animation Film Festival on 13 June 2017 and was theatrically released on 25 August 2017 in Spain by Paramount Pictures. It was also released in the US on 1 December 2017, and in the UK on 9 February 2018. It had a worldwide gross of $35,704,046 against a budget of €9,000,000 ($10,872,270) making it a box office success.

=== Reception ===
Like the first film, the sequel received mostly negative reviews from few American critics and positive reviews in Spain, though both agreeing that it is an improvement to the predecessor, particularly for its visual aspects. On review aggregator Rotten Tomatoes, the film has an approval rating of 33% based on 15 reviews.

The movie received controversy from Spanish lawyers, due to a scene in which the Mummy states that he was exiled from Paititi due to letting Tad go at the end of the events of the first film, but also due to having "A bad deal with [his] lawyer". Victoria Ortega, president of the General Council of Spanish Lawyers, wrote an open letter to Enrique Gato stating she understands said line was not written with bad intentions, but rather ignorance.

=== Accolades ===
Award	Date of ceremony	Category	Recipient(s)	Result	Ref.
Gaudí Awards	28 January 2018	Best Animated Film	David Alonso and Enrique Gato	Won	
CEC Awards	29 January 2018	Best Animated Film	David Alonso and Enrique Gato	Won	
Goya Awards	3 February 2018	Best Animated Film	David Alonso and Enrique Gato	Won	
Platino Awards	29 April 2018	Best Animated Film	Tad the Lost Explorer and the Secret of King Midas	Won	
