= Goya Award for Best Animated Short Film =

Annual award by the Spanish Film Academy

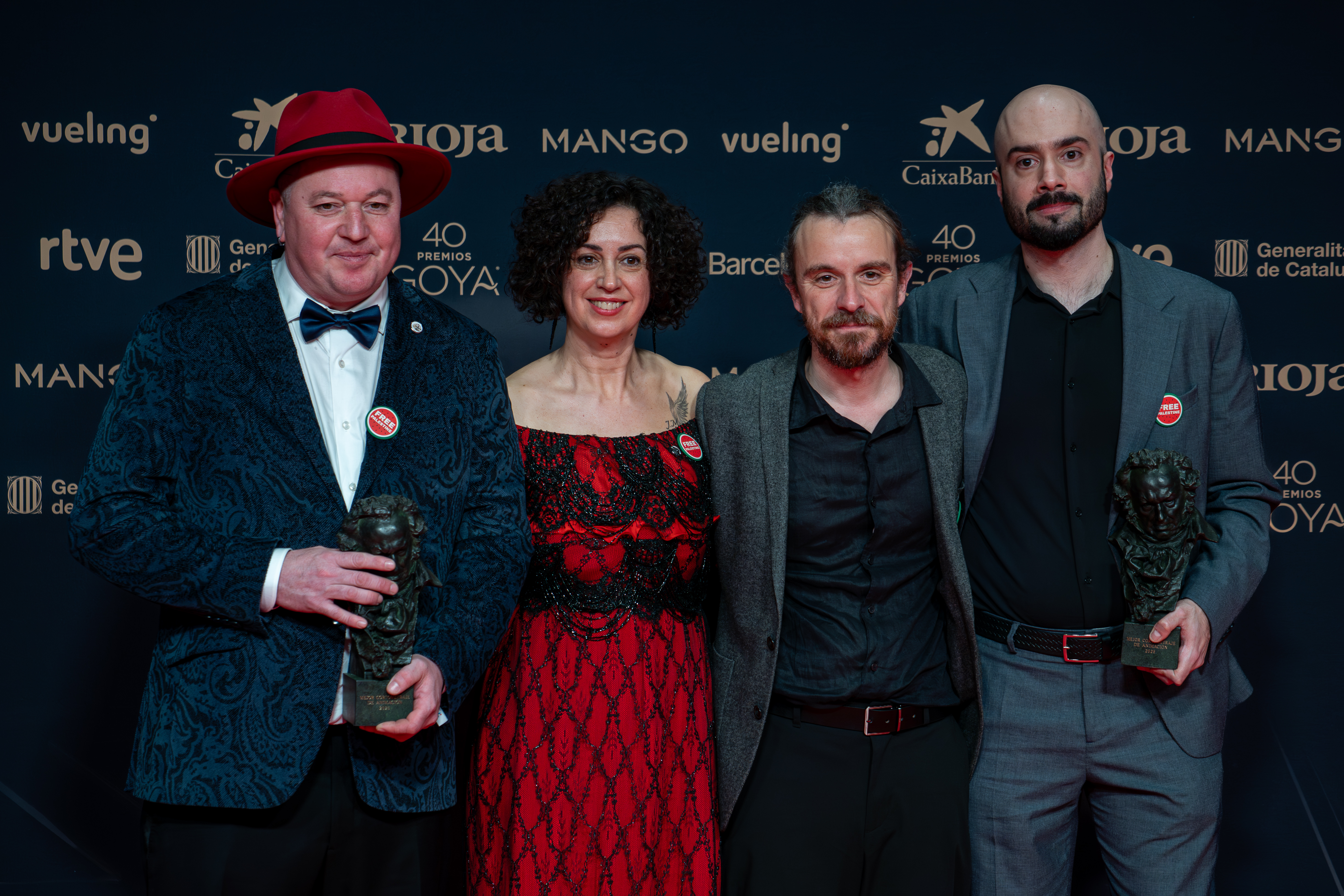
- Crew of Gilbert, the 2026 winner
- Native name: Premio Goya al mejor cortometraje de animación
- Awarded for: Best Spanish animated short film of the year
- Country: Spain
- Presented by: Academy of Cinematographic Arts and Sciences of Spain (AACCE)
- First award: 9th Goya Awards (1994)
- Most recent winner: Gilbert (2025)
- Website: Official website

The Goya Award for Best Animated Short Film (Spanish: Premio Goya al mejor cortometraje de animación) is one of the Goya Awards presented annually by the Academy of Cinematographic Arts and Sciences of Spain (AACCE) since the 9th edition of the awards in 1994. El sueño de Adán directed by Mercedes Gaspar was the first winner of the category.

The short film The Lady and the Reaper (2009) was nominated for the Academy Award for Best Animated Short Film at the 82nd Academy Awards. At the European Film Awards, the short films The Trumouse Show (2004) and Minotauromaquia, Pablo en el Laberinto (2005) have received nominations for Best Short Film.

== Winners and nominees ==
=== 1990s ===
Year	English title	Original title	Director(s)	Producer(s)
1994 (9th)	El sueño de Adán		Mercedes Gaspar	Stico Producciones
1994 (9th)	Arturo Gámez (cuerpos en tránsito)		Miquel Navarro	Miquel Navarro
1995 (10th)	Caracol, col, col		Pablo Llorens	Pablo Llorens
1995 (10th)	Las partes de mí que te aman son seres vacíos		Mercedes Gaspar	Mercedes Gaspar
1996 (11th)	Pregunta por mí		Begoña Vicario	Begoña Vicario
1996 (11th)	Esclavos de mi poder		Mercedes Gaspar	Mercedes Gaspar
1996 (11th)	Mater gloriosa		Armando Pereda	Armando Pereda
1997 (12th)	Not awarded			
1998 (13th)	Not awarded			
1999 (14th)	Los girasoles		Manuel Lagares, José Lagares	Manuel Lagares, José Lagares
1999 (14th)	Animal		Miguel Díez Lasangre	Miguel Díez Lasangre
1999 (14th)	Podría ser peor		Damián Perea Lezcano	Damián Perea Lezcano
1999 (14th)	Smoke City		Edu Martín, Mario Tarradas	Edu Martín, Mario Tarradas
1999 (14th)	William Wilson		Jorge Dayas	Jorge Dayas

=== 2000s ===
Year	English title	Original title	Director(s)	Producer(s)
2000 (15th)	Not awarded			
2001 (16th)	Pollo		Manuel Sirgo	Manuel Sirgo
2001 (16th)	El aparecido		Diego Agudo	Diego Agudo
2001 (16th)	La colección		Didac Bono	Didac Bono
2001 (16th)	W.C.		Daniel Martínez Lara	Daniel Martínez Lara
2002 (17th)	Sr. Trapo		Raúl Díez Rodríguez	Pasozebra Producciones
2002 (17th)	El negre es el color dels deus		Anna Solana, Marc Riba	Anna Solana, Marc Riba
2002 (17th)	T.V.		Pablo Núñez Fernández, Antonio Ojeda	Pablo Núñez Fernández, Antonio Ojeda
2003 (18th)	Regaré con lágrimas tus pétalos		Juan Carlos Marí	Juan Carlos Marí
2003 (18th)	A... mantis religiosa		Pablo Núñez, Antonio Ojeda	Pablo Núñez, Antonio Ojeda
2003 (18th)	El desván		José Corral	José Corral
2003 (18th)	La habitación inclinada		Pako Bagur, Freddy Córdoba, Iban José	Pako Bagur, Freddy Córdoba, Iban José
2003 (18th)	Manipai		Jorge Dayas	Jorge Dayas
2004 (19th)	El enigma del chico croqueta		Pablo Llorens	Pablo Llorens
2004 (19th)	Minotauromaquia (Pablo en el laberinto)		Juan Pablo Etcheverry	Juan Pablo Etcheverry
2004 (19th)	The Trumouse Show		Julio Robledo	Julio Robledo
2004 (19th)	Vuela por mí		Carlos Navarro	Carlos Navarro
2005 (20th)	Tadeo Jones		Enrique Gato	La Fiesta
2005 (20th)	La gallina ciega		Isabel Herguera	Isabel Herguera
2005 (20th)	La leyenda del espantapájaros		Marco Besas	Elemental Films
2005 (20th)	La luz de la esperanza		Ricardo Puertas	MAISCA
2005 (20th)	Semilla del recuerdo		Renato Roldán Ramis	Universidad de Baleares
2006 (21st)	El viaje de Said		Coke Riobóo	Embleque Producciones, SCOP, Jazzy Producciones
2006 (21st)	Another Way to Fly		Alfredo García Revuelta	Revuelta 10
2006 (21st)	Hasta la muerte		Juan Pérez-Fajardo	Lolita Producciones Cinematográficas, Samuel Martínez Martín
2006 (21st)	La noche de los feos		Manuel González Mauricio	Oasis Europkikara
2006 (21st)	Broken Wire		Juan Carlos Mostaza	Mxinema
2007 (22nd)	Tadeo Jones y el sótano maldito		Enrique Gato	Enrique Gato
2007 (22nd)	Atención al cliente		Marcos Valín, David Alonso	Marcos Valín, David Alonso
2007 (22nd)	El bufón y la infanta		Juan Galiñanes	Juan Galiñanes
2007 (22nd)	La flor más grande del mundo		Juan Pablo Etcheverry	Juan Pablo Etcheverry
2007 (22nd)	Perpetuum mobile		Raquel García-Ajofrín, Enrique García Rodríguez	Raquel García-Ajofrín, Enrique García Rodríguez
2008 (23rd)	La increíble historia del hombre sin sombra		José Esteban Alenda	José Esteban Rodríguez
2008 (23rd)	El ataque de los kriters asesinos		Samuel Ortí Martí "Sam"	Samuel Ortí Martí "Sam”
2008 (23rd)	Espagueti Western		Sami Natsheh	Sami Natsheh
2008 (23rd)	Malacara y el misterio del bastón de roble		Luis Tinoco	Luis Tinoco
2008 (23rd)	Rascal's Street		Marcos Valín, María Monescillo, David Priego	Marcos Valín, María Monescillo, David Priego
2009 (24th)	The Lady and the Reaper	La dama y la Muerte	Javier Recio	Antonio Banderas
2009 (24th)	Alma		Rodrigo Blaas	Raúl Bernabé
2009 (24th)	Margarita		Álex Cervantes	Hampa Studio
2009 (24th)	Tachaaan!		Rafael Cano, Miguel Ángel Bellot, Carlos del Olmo	Lightbox Entertainment

=== 2010s ===
Year	English title	Original title	Director(s)	Producer(s)
2010 (25th)	La bruxa		Pedro Solís García	Nicolás Matji
2010 (25th)	Exlibris		María Trénor	Clara Trénor Colomer
2010 (25th)	Tower of Time	La torre del tiempo	José Luis Quirós	José Luis Quirós
2010 (25th)	Vicenta		Samuel Ortí Martí "Sam"	Samuel Ortí Martí "Sam", Xose Zapata
2011 (26th)	Birdboy		Pedro Rivero and Alberto Vázquez	Pedro Rivero
2011 (26th)	Ella		Juan Montes de Oca	Juan Montes de Oca
2011 (26th)	Rosa		Jesús Orellana	Jesús Orellana
2011 (26th)	Zeinek Gehiago Iraun		Gregorio Muro	Gregorio Muro
2012 (27th)	El vendedor de humo		Jaime Maestro	Carlos Escutia
2012 (27th)	Alfred y Anna		Juan Manuel Suárez García	Enrique Fernández Guzmán, Enrique Fernández Medina, Olmo Figueredo
2012 (27th)	La mano de Nefertiti		Guillermo García Carsí	Nicolás Matji
2012 (27th)	¿Por qué desaparecieron los dinosaurios?		María del Mar Delgado García, Esaú Dharma Vílchez Corredor	María del Mar Delgado García
2013 (28th)	Cuerdas		Pedro Solís García	Pedro Solís García
2013 (28th)	Blue & Malone, detectives imaginarios		Abraham López Guerrero	Gerardo Álvarez León
2013 (28th)	O xigante		Julio Vanzeler, Luis da Matta	Chelo Loureiro
2013 (28th)	Vía Tango		Adriana Navarro Álvarez	Sergio Cordero de Toledo
2014 (29th)	Juan y la nube		Giovanni Maccelli	Giovanni Maccelli
2014 (29th)	A Lifestory		Nacho Rodríguez	Abelardo Fernández Bagüés
2014 (29th)	A Lonely Sun Story		Juanma Suárez García, Enrique Fernández Guzmán	Enrique Fernández Guzmán, Juanma Paz Mayral
2014 (29th)	El señor del abrigo interminable		Victoria Sahores	Emilio Luján
2014 (29th)	Sangre de unicornio		Alberto Vázquez	Iván Miñambres
2015 (30th)	Alike		Daniel Martínez Lara, Rafael Cano Méndez	Daniel Martínez Lara, Nicolás Matji
2015 (30th)	Honorio. Dos minutos de sol		Paco Gilbert, Paqui Ramírez	Francisca Ramírez Villaverde
2015 (30th)	La noche del océano		María Lorenzo Hernández	Enrique Millán Almenar
2015 (30th)	Víctimas de Guernica		Ferrán Caum	José Lagares Díaz
2016 (31st)	Decorado		Alberto Vázquez	Arturo Olea, Chelo Loureiro, Iván Miñambres, Nicolas Schmerkin
2016 (31st)	Darrel		Alan Carabantes Person, Marc Briones Piulachs	Daniel Martínez Lara
2016 (31st)	Made in Spain		Coke Riobóo	Coke Riobóo, Lourdes Villagómez Oviedo
2016 (31st)	Uka		Valle Comba Canales	David Castro González, Valle Comba Canales
2017 (32nd)	Woody & Woody		Jaume Carrió	Aline O. Tur, Miguel A. Santander, Jaume Carrió, Laura Gost
2017 (32nd)	Colores		Arly Jones, Sami Natsheh	José Antonio Saura Saura
2017 (32nd)	El ermitaño		Raúl Díez	Daniel Díez, Raúl Díez
2017 (32nd)	Un día en el parque		Diego Porral	Diego Porral
2018 (33rd)	Cazatalentos		José Herrera	Manuel Sirgo González
2018 (33rd)	El olvido		Cristina Vaello, Xenia Grey	Bea Martínez, José Antonio Saura Saura
2018 (33rd)	I Wish...		Victor L. Pinel	Emilio Luján Canalejo
2018 (33rd)	Soy una tumba		Khris Cembe	Iván Miñambres, Nicolás Schmerkin
2019 (34th)	Madrid 2120		José Luis Quirós, Paco Sáez	Nicolás Matji
2019 (34th)	El árbol de las almas perdidas		Laura Zamora Cabeza	Laura Zamora Cabeza
2019 (34th)	Homomaquia		David Fidalgo Omil	Chelo Loureiro, Mariano Baratech
2019 (34th)	Muedra		César Díaz Meléndez	Pedro Collantes de Terán Bayonas

=== 2020s ===
Year	English title	Original title	Director(s)	Producer(s)
2020 (35th)	Blue & Malone: casos imposibles		Abraham López Guerrero	Emilio Luján, Gerardo Álvarez, Manuel Carbajo Martín, Nathalie Martínez, Pablo de la Chica
2020 (35th)	Homeless Home		Alberto Vázquez	Iván Miñambres, Nicolás Schmerkin
2020 (35th)	Metamorphosis		Carla Pereira, Juanfran Jacinto	Nicolás Schmerkin, Ramón Alós
2020 (35th)	Vuela		Carlos Gómez-Mira Sagrado	Rossana Giacomelli
2021 (36th)	The Monkey		Lorenzo Degl'Innocenti, Xosé Zapata	Diogo Carvalho, Nicolás Matji, Nuno Beato, Xosé Zapata
2021 (36th)	Nacer		Roberto Valle	Carlos Valle Casas, Iván Miñambres, Néstor López
2021 (36th)	Proceso de selección		Carla Pereira	Paloma Mora
2021 (36th)	Umbrellas		Álvaro Robles, José Prats	Ana María Ferri, Ramón Alòs Sánchez
2022 (37th)	Loop		Pablo Polledri	Iván Miñambres
2022 (37th)	Amanece la noche más larga		Carlos Fernández de Vigo, Lorena Ares	Carlos Fernández de Vigo, Joaquín Calderón, Mintxo Díaz
2022 (37th)	Amarradas		Carmen Córdoba González	Carmen Córdoba González
2022 (37th)	La prima cosa		Omar Al Abdul Razzak Martínez, Shira Ukrainitz	Manuel Arango, Omar Al Abdul Razzak Martínez, Shira Ukrainitz
2022 (37th)	La primavera siempre vuelve		Alicia Núñez Puerto	Alicia Núñez Puerto
2023 (38th)	To Bird or Not To Bird		Martín Romero	Martín Romero, Chelo Loureiro, Iván Miñambres
2023 (38th)	Becarias		Marina Cortón, Marina Donderis, Núria Poveda	Iván Madolell, Leticia Montalvá, Pablo Muñoz Naharro, Vicente Mallols
2023 (38th)	Todo bien		Diana Acién Manzorro	Diana Acién Manzorro, Rocío Benavent Méndez
2023 (38th)	Todo está perdido		Carla Pereira, Juanfran Jacinto	Álvaro Díaz, David Castro González, Jorge Acosta
2023 (38th)	Txotxongiloa		Sonia Estévez	Sonia Estévez
2024 (39th)	Cafunè		Carlos Fernández de Vigo, Lorena Ares	Carlos Fernández de Vigo, Damián Perea, Mintxo Díaz, Sergy Moreno
2024 (39th)	El cambio de rueda		Begoña Arostegui	Ainhoa Ramírez Lucendo, Fernando Franco, León Siminiani
2024 (39th)	La mujer ilustrada		Isabel Herguera	Diego Herguera
2024 (39th)	Lola, Lolita, Lolaza		Mabel Lozano	Chelo Loureiro, Mabel Lozano, Pablo Jimeno, Raúl Berdonés
2024 (39th)	Wan		Víctor Monigote	Carlos Ayerbe
2025 (40th)	Gilbert		Alex Salu, Arturo Lacal, Jordi Jiménez	Mónica Gallego
2025 (40th)	Buffet paraiso		Héctor Zafra, Santi Amézqueta	Álex Cervantes, Roger Torras
2025 (40th)	Carmela		Vicente Mallols	David Castro González, Ilan Urroz, Leticia Montalvá
2025 (40th)	El corto de Rubén		Jose María Fernández de Vega	
2025 (40th)	El estado del Alma		Sara Naves	Diogo Carvalho, Jose María Fernández de Vega, Nuno Beato
2025 (40th)	Gilbert		Alex Salu, Arturo Lacal, Jordi Jiménez	Mónica Gallego
2025 (40th)	Buffet paraiso		Héctor Zafra, Santi Amézqueta	Álex Cervantes, Roger Torras
2025 (40th)	Carmela		Vicente Mallols	David Castro González, Ilan Urroz, Leticia Montalvá
2025 (40th)	El corto de Rubén		Jose María Fernández de Vega	Jose María Fernández de Vega
2025 (40th)	El estado del alma		Sara Naves	Diogo Carvalho, Jose María Fernández de Vega, Nuno Beato
