= The Nest (2026 film) =

- Theatrical release poster
- Spanish: El nido
- Directed by: Hugo Stuven
- Written by: Santiago Lallana; Hugo Stuven; César de Nicolás
- Produced by: Carlos Fernández; Laura Fernández Brites
- Starring: Michelle Jenner; Luisa Gavasa; Pablo Derqui; Dylan Radley
- Cinematography: Ángel Iguácel
- Edited by: Nacho Ruiz Capillas
- Music by: Vanessa Garde
- Production companies: La Maldad La Película AIE; Castelao Pictures; Castelao Productions
- Distributed by: Filmax
- Release dates: 5 July 2026 (l'Alfàs del Pi); 11 September 2026 (Spain)
- Running time: 109 minutes
- Country: Spain
- Language: Spanish

The Nest (Spanish: El nido) is a 2026 Spanish psychological thriller film directed by Hugo Stuven, who shared writing duties with Santiago Lallana and César de Nicolás. It stars Michelle Jenner alongside Luisa Gavasa, Pablo Derqui, and newcomer Dylan Radley.

== Plot ==
Overprotective Marta is so obsessed that she trapped her mother and her son in a cabin, but the arrival of Velasco upends their lives.

== Cast ==
- Michelle Jenner as Marta
- Luisa Gavasa
- Pablo Derqui
- Dylan Radley

== Production ==
The film was developed under Filmax with the backing from RTVE, Movistar Plus+, and ICAA. It was shot in and around Barcelona.

== Release ==
The Nest's presentation was programmed for 5 July 2026 at the 38th L'Alfàs del Pi Film Festival. Distributed by Filmax, the film is scheduled to be released theatrically in Spain on 11 September 2026.

== Reception ==
Philipp Engel of Cinemanía rated the film 3 out of 5 stars, writing that the film feels like a homage to the fantaterror films of Fantastic Fastory, although it does not bring any element that bring that legacy up to date.

In a 3-star rating, Blai Morell of Fotogramas cited the mise-en-scène as the best thing about the film, yet also mentioning a "screenplay that starts to show its seams in the last third" as the worst thing about it.

== See also ==
- List of Spanish films of 2026
