= Tad, the Lost Explorer and the Emerald Tablet =

- Theatrical release poster
- Spanish: Tadeo Jones 3: La tabla esmeralda
- Directed by: Enrique Gato
- Written by: Josep Gatell; Manuel Burque
- Produced by: Ghislain Barrois; Álvaro Augustin; Nicolás Matji; Edmon Roch; Marc Sabé; Javier Ugarte
- Starring: Óscar Barberán; Michelle Jenner; Tito Valverde; Alexandra Jiménez; Cecilia Suárez; José Corbacho; Luis Posada
- Cinematography: David Alonso (camera); Pepe Cazorla (lighting)
- Edited by: Alexander Adams
- Music by: Zacarías M. de la Riva
- Production companies: Telecinco Cinema; Lightbox Animation Studios; Ikiru Films; Anangu Grup; La Tadeopelícula AIE
- Distributed by: Paramount Pictures
- Release dates: 24 August 2022 (France); 26 August 2022 (Spain)
- Running time: 89 minutes
- Country: Spain
- Language: Spanish
- Budget: €11 million
- Box office: US$32.8 million

Tad, the Lost Explorer and the Emerald Tablet (Spanish: Tadeo Jones 3: La tabla esmeralda) is a 2022 Spanish animated adventure comedy film directed by Enrique Gato and written by Josep Gatell and Manuel Burque. It is the third installment in the Tad Stones film series, being a sequel to Tad the Lost Explorer and the Secret of King Midas.

A fourth installment, Tad and the Magic Lamp, was released in 2026.

== Plot ==
After Tad discovers an Egyptian sarcophagus and a pendant from a temple site in Mexico, he is fired from archaeology. That night, the sarcophagus is transported to a museum in Chicago by three international archaeologists.

Meanwhile, Tad is visited by Professor Victoria Moon, who explains that Hermes Trismegistus created a tablet that controls magic named The Emerald Tablet, and its power caused Cheops to achieve greatness. However, tired of the pharaoh never accepting the merits, Hermes decides to use the tablet to overthrow him, and attempted to summon beasts against the armies with it, but the pharaoh discovered his plan and hid the tablet away. Napoleon Bonaparte found the tablet but was then returned after its power was deemed hard to control. However, his archaeologist, Dominique Vivant Denon, left behind an engraving leading to the tablet. She also recalls that she has kept Dominique's diary, containing a fragment of the tablet.

Returning home, Tad learns about the sarcophagus's transfer to the museum. That night, Tad, Mummy, and pets Jeff and Belzoni sneak in and open the sarcophagus, accidentally cursing the latter three. Tad realizes about the curse from the tablet, and recalls about Dominique's office in the Louvre in Paris.

Upon arrival, they meet and convince mummy Ra Amon Ah to help them. They are tracked and chased by agents Ramírez and Sam Pickle, along with their other agents, but the group escape. Afterwards, the group learns that Mummy transforms into an amalgamation of various animals if too upset, and back to his original form if calmed. Ra then accepts to take the group to a museum, and the group set off to Aswan, Egypt.

After Tad retrieves a key at a fountain, the agents catch up to the group again. Tad accuses Mummy of defacing the Mona Lisa during their journey. Mummy's emotion triggers his transformation, allowing him to help the group escape.

Tad reunites with Sara at a site, and they both sneak into a cave, where they use the key to reveal a map that reveals the Emerald Tablet's location in the Great Pyramid. Afterwards, Tad convinces the others, including the international archaeologists and Victoria, about the map. However, Victoria reveals herself to have been possessed with the tablet, and traps the group inside the cave before leaving. The group attempt to escape, but is subsequently apprehended, and Pickle orders them detained for their crimes.

Tad tearfully admits of being a danger to everyone and about being an archaeologist. Mummy helps them escape, but Ra decides to abandon the group to go to her museum. They reach the pyramid, only to find that Victoria has already taken the tablet. She then enslaves Mummy, transforming him into a monstrous beast. During a struggle, Tad sacrifices Mummy to recover the tablet. Although initially thought Mummy is dead, the tablet has suddenly taken over him, which goes back to before Mummy's death. He is able to destroy the tablet, which restores Mummy, Jeff, and Belzoni.

As the group return to the surface, the group are released from their crimes, and they embark on a journey to find the treasure of King Pakal next.

== Voice cast ==
=== Spanish track ===
- Óscar Barberán as Tadeo Jones
- Michelle Jenner as Sara Lavrof
- Luis Posada as Momia
- José Corbacho as Ryu
- Alexandra Jiménez as Victoria
- Cecilia Suárez as Agente Ramírez
- Tito Valverde as Agente Pickle
- Ana Esther Alborg as Ra Amon Ah
- Manuel Burque as Martín

=== English ===
- Trevor White as Tad Stones
- Alex Kelly as Sara
- Joseph Balderrama as Mummy
- Pippa Bennett-Warner as Ra Amon Ah
- Elena Sanz as Victoria
- Elena Saurel as Agent Ramírez
- Gary Martin as Agent Pickle
- Ed Gaughan as Ryu
- Joseph Balderrama as Martin

== Production ==
The film is a Telecinco Cinema, Lightbox Animation Studios, Ikiru Films, Anangu Grup and La Tadeopelícula AIE production, and it had the participation of Mediaset España, Movistar Plus+, and Mediterráneo Mediaset España Group. It was written by Josep Gatell and Manuel Burque. Produced by Dabruk, the film's main theme ("Si tú me llamas") was performed by Omar Montes and Belinda. The film had a reported budget of €11 million.

== Release ==
Distributed worldwide by Paramount Pictures, the film opened in French theatres on 24 August 2022. It was then theatrically released in Spain on 26 August 2022. It became the highest-grossing film of the weekend at the Spanish box office, also having, up to that point in the year, both the 2nd-largest opening weekend for any animated film (after Minions: The Rise of Gru) and the 2nd-largest opening weekend for any Spanish film (after Father There Is Only One 3). It opened in the UK and Ireland on 9 September 2022 and it opened in the US and Canada on 4 November 2022 under the title Tad the Lost Explorer and the Curse of the Mummy, also distributed by Paramount.

== Reception ==
Unlike previous films, this one was also praised by American audiences. On review aggregator Rotten Tomatoes, the film has an approval rating of 90% based on 10 reviews.

Rubén Romero Santos of Cinemanía rated the film 4 out of 5 stars writing that "the planning of the constant action scenes is remarkable, a technical prodigy that places Spanish animation at the forefront".

Beatriz Martínez of El Periódico de Catalunya rated the film 3 out of 5 stars, assessing that it manages to reach "a greater degree of virtuosity" [than the previous two films], with its plot being "better articulated, its structure is more agile, it is more adventurous, funnier and has better ideas".

María Bescós of HobbyConsolas rated the film 60 out of 100 points ("acceptable"), deeming it to be an improvement from the previous installments of the saga, while still citing the "predictable" plot, the "simplistic" humor, and some additional work to do with the animation as negative points.

Javier Ocaña of El País found the film to be "the most refined [out of the three installments]", with the portrayal of Tadeo being the most surprising element, otherwise highlighting the "outstanding dubbing work throughout the three films [delivered] by Óscar Barberán, [featuring] a beautiful voice full of nuances in tone".

Mike McCahill of The Guardian rated the film 3 out of 5 stars underscoring how "[it] is never more than inessential screen filler, but agreeably jolly with it – partly as it does have some idea of how to fill a screen".

== Accolades ==
Year	Award	Category	Nominee(s)	Result	Ref.
2023	15th Gaudí Awards	Best Animated Film		Won	
2023	15th Gaudí Awards	Best Visual Effects	David Blanco	Nominated	
2023	78th CEC Medals	Best Animated Film		Won	
2023	37th Goya Awards	Best Animated Film		Nominated	

== Sequel ==
A fourth instalment Tad and the Magic Lamp, was released in 2026.

== See also ==
- List of Spanish films of 2022
