= Joseph Balderrama =

Mexican actor (born 1986)

- Born: Mexico City, Mexico
- Other name: Pepe Balderrama
- Education: University of Glasgow; London Academy of Music and Dramatic Art
- Occupation: Actor
- Years active: 2003–present
- Spouse: Coco Wake-Porter

Joseph Balderrama is a Mexican actor. His films include Stan & Ollie (2018). On television, he is known for his roles in the Netflix series Heartstopper (2022–2026) and the BritBox series Hotel Portofino (2023). His voice work includes the video games It Takes Two (2021) and Diablo IV (2024).

== Early life ==
Balderrama was born in Mexico City to a Mexican father and an American mother and moved to England when he was ten. He attended Alleyn's School in Dulwich, completing his A Levels in 1995. He also studied abroad at Phillips Academy Andover during his time at Alleyn's. He joined the National Youth Theatre. He graduated with a Scottish Master of Arts in History from the University of Glasgow in 1999 followed by a three-year acting diploma on a scholarship at the London Academy of Music and Dramatic Art (LAMDA) in 2002.

== Career ==
After graduating from drama school, Balderrama made his professional stage debut as Benvolio in the 2003 English Touring Theatre production of Romeo and Juliet alongside Adam Croasdell, Laura Rees, OT Fagbenle, and Michael Cronin. He also made his television debut and feature film debut with small roles in an episode of the ITV police procedural The Vice and the horror film Alien vs Predator respectively. Balderrama played Santiago in the 2006 film The Flying Scotsman. He appeared in the Oxford Castle productions of The Merchant of Venice and Hamlet, Accidental Death of an Anarchist at the Mercury Theatre in Colchester, No Such Cold Thing at the Tricycle Theatre in London, and The Miser at the Royal Exchange, Manchester.

In 2010, Balderrama starred in Oliver Cotton's Wet Weather Cover at the King's Head Theatre and Arts Theatre, the latter of which marked Balderrama's West End debut. He also had roles in the BBC Four docudrama Canoe Man and the comedy Schizo Samurai Shitzu. He appeared in The White House Murder Case at the Orange Tree Theatre and The Rubber Room at the Old Vic in 2012, and Labyrinth at the Hampstead Theatre and Drones, Baby, Drones at the Arcola Theatre in 2016.

Having begun working on video games in 2008 and early on in his voice work, Balderrama voiced the likes of Stavo Delgado in Wheelman, Killer Moth in Lego Batman 2: DC Super Heroes, and Sangres in Payday 2. He then voiced Cotter in Game of Thrones: A Telltale Games Series in 2014 and had a small role in the 2015 James Bond film Spectre.

Balderrama returned to the West End in 2017 for All the President's Men at the Vaudeville Theatre, and to the Hampstead Theatre in 2018 for Dry Powder. He portrayed James W. Horne in the 2018 biographical comedy film Stan & Ollie with Steve Coogan and John C. Reilly and had a recurring role as Tony in the BBC One drama Press. He had further voice roles in video games such as the English dub of Dragon Quest XI, The Crew 2, and Ghost Recon Breakpoint.

In 2020, Balderrama had a recurring role as Tim in the HBO and Sky One science fiction series Avenue 5. In 2021, he starred in A Fight Against… (Spanish: Una Lucha Contra…) at the Royal Court Theatre and the video game It Takes Two with Annabelle Dowler; for the latter, Balderrama performed motion capture and voiced the lead character Cody as well as Dr Hakim. The following year, Balderrama began playing Julio Spring, Charlie Spring's (Joe Locke) father in the Netflix series Heartstopper and appeared in the film Uncharted. Balderrama joined the cast of the BritBox series Hotel Portofino for its second series, which aired in 2023, as Luigi Farrino. That same year, he voiced the Sorcerer in Diablo IV.

In 2025, Balderrama played Rico Fazio, a race engineer, in the film F1 the Movie.

== Filmography ==
=== Film ===
Year	Title	Role	Notes
2004	Alien vs. Predator	High Priest	
2006	Alien Autopsy	News Presenter	
2006	The Flying Scotsman	Santiago	
2007	I Want Candy	Man	
2011	Jack and Jill	Spanish Valet	
2012	The Unfortunate Truth	Seymore Galintinee	Short film
2013	The Scampi Trail	Mr. Pepe	
2014	Job's Dinner	Eli	Short film
2014	White Collar Hooligan 3	Detective Pablo	
2014	The Engagement	Ricardo	Short film
2015	Last Love	Roberto	Short film
2015	Spectre	Head of Nation	
2017	Tad the Lost Explorer and the Secret of King Midas	Mummy / Construction Worker	Voice role (English dub)
2017	The Current War: Director's Cut	Horace Kaden	
2018	Stan & Ollie	James W. Horne	
2019	A Shaun the Sheep Movie: Farmageddon	Additional voices	
2019	Master Moley		Short film; voice role
2020	Dolittle	Prisoner	
2022	Uncharted	Carlos	
2022	The Batman	Lead Detective	
2022	The Contract	Elio	Short film
2022	Tad, the Lost Explorer and the Emerald Tablet	Mummy/Martin	Voice role (English dub)
2023	Under the Boardwalk	Chauncey	Voice role
2024	Paddington in Peru	Elderly Resident Bear 2	Voice Role
2024	The Substance	Craig Silver	
2025	F1	Rico Fazio	
2026	Heartstopper Forever	Julio Spring	Television film

=== Television ===
Year	Title	Role	Notes
2003	The Vice	Bell Boy	Episode: "Birdhouse"
2005	The Robinsons	Alfonso	1 episode
2007	The Bill	Santi Garcia	Episode: "Lead on a Merry Chase"
2007	Bremner, Bird and Fortune	Mexican Rory	1 episode
2007	The Omid Djalili Show	John Boy Ross	1 episode
2008	Holby City	Ray Glover	Episode: "The Extra Mile"
2010	Canoe Man	Carlos	Television film
2010	Schizo Samurai Shitzu	Hood	5 episodes
2011	Episodes	Tour Guide	1 episode
2014	Borgia	Gugliemo Farnese	Episode: "1495"
2014	Not Going Out	Mario	Episode: "Surprise"
2015	I Live with Models	Client	Episode: "Anna the Agent"
2017	Snatch	Filippe	Episode: "A Family Affair"
2018	Press	Tony	3 episodes
2019	Turn Up Charlie	Ethan	1 episode
2019	Living the Dream	Frank	Episode: "The British Method"
2020	Let's Go See... Egypt	Captain Ollie / Lucas	Voice role
2020–2022	Avenue 5	Tim	6 episodes
2021	The Great Escapists		Miniseries
2022	Tulipop		Voice role
2022	The Creature Cases	Armadillo	Voice role
2022–2024	Heartstopper	Julio Spring	Recurring role
2022	FBI: International	Dr. Luc Michaud	Episode: "Get That Revolution Started"
2022	Best & Bester	Various	Voice role
2022	Big Tree City	Tricks / Russell Plaza	Voice role
2022	Combat Ships 3	Narrator	Docuseries
2023	Hotel Portofino	Luigi Farrino	Main role
2023	Jack Ryan	Javier Oreja	Episode: "Proof of Concept"
2023	Ancient Empires	Parmenion	Episode: "Alexander the Great"
2025	Silo	James Alameda	2 episodes
2025	Man vs. Baby	Cesar Jimenez	Episode 1

=== Video games ===
Year	Title	Role	Notes
2008	Haze	Additional voices	
2009	Wheelman	Stavo Delgado	
2009	Colin McRae: Dirt 2		
2010	APB: All Points Bulletin		
2011	Operation Flashpoint: Red River	Marines	
2012	Lego Batman 2: DC Super Heroes	Killer Moth	
2012	007 Legends	Additional voices	
2013	Lego City Undercover		
2013	Payday 2	Sangres	
2014	Game of Thrones: A Telltale Games Series	Cotter	
2017	Dragon Quest XI	Don Rodrigo	English version
2017	The Lego Ninjago Movie Videogame	Kai	
2017	Need for Speed Payback		
2018	A Way Out	Additional voices	
2018	Lego The Incredibles	Citizen	
2018	The Crew 2	Edgar "Tio" Marquez	
2018	Overkill's The Walking Dead	The Family	
2019	Ghost Recon Breakpoint	Various	
2020	Relicta	Dr. Ollin Kwarizmi / The Parasite	
2020	Troy: A Total War Saga		
2021	It Takes Two	Cody / Dr. Hakim	
2021	Evil Genius 2: World Domination	Espectro / Blue Saint	
2021	Battlefield 2042	Santiago "Dozer" Espinoza	
2022	Horizon Forbidden West	Additional voices	
2022	Triangle Strategy	Patriatte	
2022	Sniper Elite 5	Lt. Jeff Sullivan	
2022	As Dusk Falls	Lone Cop	
2023	Peppa Pig: World Adventures	Señor Cat	
2023	Diablo IV	Sorcerer	
2023	Aliens: Dark Descent	Sergeant Rico Martinez	
2023	Jagged Alliance 3	Fidel	
2023	Lies of P	King of Riddles / Arlecchino	Reprises role in 2025 Overture DLC
2023	Transformers: EarthSpark	Ratchet	
2023	Alan Wake 2		

== Stage ==
Year	Title	Role	Notes
2003	Romeo and Juliet	Benvolio	English Touring Theatre
2006	The Merchant of Venice	Gratiano	Oxford Castle, Oxford
2006	Arabian Nights	Ali Babba / Ensemble	Mirror Tent BMW, Cowley
2006	Hamlet	Laertes	Oxford Castle, Oxford
2008	Accidental Death of an Anarchist	Bertozzo	Mercury Theatre, Colchester
2008	No Such Cold Thing	Sergio	Tricycle Theatre, London
2009	The Miser	Maitre Simon / Dame Claude	Royal Exchange, Manchester
2010	Wet Weather Cover	Pepe	King's Head Theatre / Arts Theatre, London
2012	The White House Murder Case	Capt Weems	Orange Tree Theatre, Richmond-upon-Thames
2012	The Rubber Room	Mr. Rodriguez	Old Vic, London
2016	Labyrinth	Minister / Business Man	Hampstead Theatre, London
2016	Drones, Baby, Drones	Jay Neroli / Ramon	Arcola Theatre, London
2017	All the President's Men	Menendez / Murphy / Durbin	Vaudeville Theatre, London
2018	Dry Powder	Jeff	Hampstead Theatre, London
2021	A Fight Against… (Spanish: Una Lucha Contra…)	Bob	Royal Court Theatre, London

== Audio ==
Year	Title	Role	Notes
2016	The Old Man and the Sea	Manolin	BBC Radio 4
2019	DK Life Stories: Nelson Mandela	Narrator	Audiobook
2019	On the Plain of Snakes	Narrator	Audiobook
2020	Tender is The Flesh	Narrator	Audiobook
