= Tadeo Jones =

Film by Enrique Gato

- Directed by: Enrique Gato
- Screenplay by: José Ángel Esteban; Carlos López; Manolo Matji; Enrique Gato
- Edited by: Enrique Gato
- Music by: Zacarías M. de la Riva
- Production company: La Fiesta Producciones
- Distributed by: Lolita Peliculitas Visual Arts
- Release date: November 4, 2004
- Running time: 8 minutes
- Country: Spain
- Budget: €43,000

Tadeo Jones is a 2004 Spanish short animated film directed by Enrique Gato. It tells the story of Tadeo Jones, an adventurer who enters a pyramid where he finds a family of mummies. The project of this film was born when Gato wanted to make a short film containing more action and humour than his previous projects, so he decided to make a parody of the adventure genre, whose representative figure is Indiana Jones. The story contains many elements from Raiders of the Lost Ark. The synopsis, in the director's words, is "adventurer Tadeo Jones is a little foolish but stubborn to explore an ancient pyramid and will run into a family of mummies." (Note: Original quote in Spanish: "Tadeo es un aventurero un poco insensato y cabezota que explorará una milenaria pirámide y se topará con una moderna familia de momias." See Nunez 2006, p. 4 and Nunez 2006, p. 5.)

The film won sixty-five awards including the Goya Award for Best Animated Short Film at the 20th Goya Awards and a British Academy of Film and Television Arts (BAFTA), and it was pre-selected for the Academy Award for Best Animated Short Film list, but it didn't gather the nomination as one of the five selected shorts. Three years later, there was a sequel to the short film called Tadeo Jones and the Basement of Doom. A feature-length animated film, Tad, the Lost Explorer, featuring Tadeo Jones (named Tad Stones in English), was released in 2012, beginning a film series.

== Plot ==
Tadeo Jones is in a maze inside a pyramid looking for the exit and gets access to a room with a statue, which needs one euro to activate the exit mechanism. Instead, he gets through using a knife. In the next room, Tadeo discovers a crank to turn, opening a door leading to treasure, but if he stops moving it abruptly closes. What he does not know is that turning the crank opens the coffins of a family of mummies. When going to take the treasure, Tadeo hears the sound of the door and discovers a mummy father. Tadeo flees but meets a river that prevents him from passing. He continues to run away and gets on a train where six children laugh at him. Eventually, Tadeo discovers that it is a carnival ride called "Terror en la cripta" (literally "Terror in the Crypt").

== Characters ==
The protagonist is Tadeo Jones, an adventurer who easily gets into trouble, who goes into an ancient pyramid. The figure is mainly inspired by Indiana Jones, as Tadeo is seen in his hat. Tadeo's limbs came from Mickey Mouse, and although with a long face, his eyes, large nose and mouth are based on Mortadelo (Mort & Phil). The family of mummies consists of a father mummy who is the head of it, who is upset when Tadeo breaks in. The father mummies forehead, jaw and eyes resemble Victor Frankenstein. The mother (who is the caretaker of the family) was influenced by Lara Croft and the baby (who becomes the main enemy) was influenced from Who Framed Roger Rabbit and the eyes came from Dash from The Incredibles. Appearing at the end of the film, there are six children wearing explorer clothing who participated in the attraction ("Terror en la cripta"). The creators did not give much importance to them as they appeared on the screen for a few seconds, so one was copied six times and only the clothes changed.

== Production ==
The character Tadeo Jones was created in 2001 as a parody of Indiana Jones. However, the project did not start until two years later when Gato begun to write the script. In September 2003, negotiations begun with La Fiesta production and four other scripts were written.

== Reception ==
Gato decided to use a professional distributor of Spanish films, Lolita Peliculitas Visual Arts, to submit it for film festivals. The film premiered on 4 November 2004 and was well received that later achieved sixty-five awards, including a BAFTA and the Goya Award for Best Animated Short Film at the 20th Goya Awards. Tadeo Jones was budgeted to cost 43,000 euros, but no final figure has been released.

== Bibliography ==
- Nunez, Martin (2006). "Jornades of Foment of Investigació" (PDF). Jaume I University. Archived from the original (PDF) on 2014-03-16.
- Calvo, Antonio G. (2008). "10 interviews short". X short week. Archived from the original on 2011-09-28.
