= Jan (comic book writer) =

Spanish comic book writer and artist (born 1939)

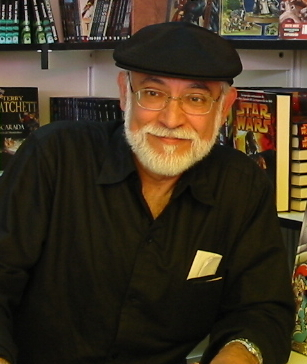
- Jan in 2006
- Born: Juan López Fernández; 13 March 1939 (age 87) Toral de los Vados (León), Spain
- Areas: Penciller, Writer, Inker, Colorist; Related: Animator
- Pseudonyms: Jan, JuanJosé
- Notable works: Superlópez; Pulgarcito

Signature
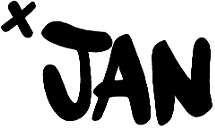

Self-portrait of Jan, alongside his creation Superlópez

Juan López Fernández (born 13 March 1939), better known by his pen name Jan, is a Spanish comic book writer and artist, most famous for his creation Superlópez.

== Biography ==
He was born in the town of Toral de los Vados in the province of León. Completely deaf from the age of six, his parents encouraged him to draw and in 1956, he began to work in a studio in order to learn animation.

He emigrated to Cuba in 1959 where he worked in Televisión Cubana (Cuban Television) and the Instituto Cubano de Arte e Industria Cinematográficos (ICAIC) (Cuban Institute of Cinematographic Art and Industry). He also collaborated on some periodicals for children at this time, and later, on comic books and newspaper supplements.

Jan returned to Spain in 1969, and worked in the now defunct publishing house Editorial Bruguera until 1985 where he helped illustrate the work of other comic book artists.

In 1973, however, Jan created Superlópez, a parodized version of Superman. It was a series that began as a single page and later expanded into full albums, with adventures involving supervillains and criminal organizations. It also dealt with issues affecting contemporary Spain, namely the illegal drug trade, the transition to democracy post General Franco, etc.. The stories had originally been written by Efepé (pseudonym of Francisco Pérez Navarro), but Jan later took over this duty as well.

In 1982, Jan worked on the periodical Pulgarcito for Editorial Bruguera, and stopped work on Superlópez in order to do so. However, he decided to abandon this in order to devote himself fully to his creation. Jan's eldest son ended up doing some work on Pulgarcito, but also eventually abandoned this task. In 2014, some of the Pulgarcito books was released again in a new book format.

When Editorial Bruguera was shut down in 1985, Jan, together with many other comic book writers, had to do work for other editorial companies. Jan published his first (and only) erotic comic 'Laszivia' in Norma Editorial, and created characters such as 'Cab Halloloco' and 'Los ultimos de Villapiñas' for the Jauja comic magazine. The character 'Superioribus', drawn for the editorial Forum, is also a superhero parody. In 1987, Ediciones B began publishing a Superlopez magazine. In this way Jan can continue working on this character until now, with a few other contributions from time to time to other magazines, such as the characters Pum Tarrota or Super Tron.

== Awards and recognition ==
In May 2002, he received the Grand Prize of the Barcelona International Comics Convention that acknowledged his contributions. In 2013, he was awarded the National Beaux Arts Medal but rejected it in coherence with his beliefs.
