= Tad and the Magic Lamp =

- Theatrical release poster
- Spanish: Tadeo Jones y la lámpara maravillosa
- Directed by: Enrique Gato
- Written by: Josep Gatell; Manuel Burque
- Produced by: Ghislain Barrois; Álvaro Augustin; Nicolás Matji; Edmon Roch; Marc Sabé; Javier Ugarte
- Starring: Óscar Barberán; Michelle Jenner; Luis Posada; Petra Martínez; Carlos Latre
- Edited by: Alexander Adams
- Music by: Zacarías M. de la Riva
- Production companies: Telecinco Cinema; Lightbox Animation Studios; Ikiru Films; Tadeo Films AIE; Anangu Grup
- Distributed by: Paramount Pictures
- Release date: 26 August 2026
- Running time: 94 minutes
- Country: Spain
- Language: Spanish
- Budget: €12.7 million ($14.2 million)
- Box office: €11.3 million

Tad and the Magic Lamp (Spanish: Tadeo Jones y la lámpara maravillosa) is a 2026 Spanish animated adventure comedy film directed by Enrique Gato and written by Josep Gatell and Manuel Burque. It is the fourth feature film of the Tad Stones series.

== Plot ==
Tad Stones is now living in London has been married with his fiancée, Sara Lavrof, and together, they raise their 2-year-old daughter, Olimpia. One day, Tad and Mummy are alerted by Sara, their robot Archeobot and Ra Amon Ah, as they are pursued by a Persian man (described as handsome by Ra Amon Ah) named Suleiman, descendent of Suleiman the Magnificent for a lamp, first discovered by Aladdin. Sara explains that, at the end of the 19th century, an English explorer discovered the lamp, and brought it to her palace at the British Empire as a gift to Queen Victoria. Victoria is initially displeased with the lamp at first, but when she rubbed it, she unintentionally summoned a genie. After granting three wishes of inventing common types of hats, she hid the lamp in a glass case.

The group visit a secret entry, and open a secret entrance leading to Victoria's office in Buckingham Palace. Mummy and Ra acquire the lamp and grant their three wishes; the first two gives pets Belzoni and Jeff the ability to talk, the final one brings the pair, and Sara and Belzoni to Paititi in 1502. There, they are captured by a guardian named Tupac and brought before its king. Mummy learns that Tupac is actually his self 500 years prior.

After Tupac is accidentally expelled from the city, the group plan to use the lamp, located in Greece, to return to the present and reinstate Tupac as guardian. However, Tupac secretly intends to use the lamp to overthrow Paititi. Meanwhile, back at Victoria's office, Tad, Olimpia, and Jeff is ambushed by Suleiman, narrowly escaping to Paititi, but the lamp is destroyed. The group is then imprisoned when trying to sneak into the city. Tad and Olimpia reunite with Mummy, and together they manage to escape. That night, when the group learn that Sara, Ra, and Tupac had set off to Greece, they enter a ship from Christopher Columbus to catch up.

Meanwhile, Sara, Ra, and Tupac encounter a 10-year old Suleiman and his henchmen. The group convince Suleiman about the location of the lamp, but he then imprisons the group, save for Tupac. Tad, Mummy, and Olimpia reach Greece, and open a secret room at the Parthenon. Alone, Tad acquires a scroll revealing the location of the lamp. Afterwards, Suleiman arrives and takes the scroll for himself before having the group detained.

Tad and Mummy reunite with Sara, Ra, Belzoni, and Jeff. Sara tearfully tells Tad about that Mummy and Olimpia wouldn't exist. They manage to escape from prison, and pursue and battle Suleiman on a chariot. Afterwards, Mummy and Olimpia slowly start to fade from existence. The group hurry to the hideout of the lamp; Suleiman catches up to them and successfully retrieves the lamp, but triggers a cave-in. In the ensuing chaos, Tad grabs the lamp and grants the remaining two wishes; to send Suleiman and his thieves back to their homes, and Sara and the rest back to London in the present, but the lamp is lost in the process, prompting him to abandon the group.

As Tad and Tupac return to the surface, they return to Paititi, where Tupac is announced as the new title of Royal Guardian, but Tad is imprisoned. Sometime later, an adult Olimpia arrives with the lamp, reconciling with Tad. She then grants one final wish to restore her previous self and return to London. As they return to the surface, the group decide to celebrate.

== Voice cast ==
=== Spanish Version ===
- Óscar Barberán as Tadeo Jones
- Michelle Jenner as Sara and Adult Olimpia
- Luis Posada as Momia/Tupac
- Carla Mercader as Ramona
- Carlos Latre as Jeff and Belzoni
- Petra Martínez as Genia
- Elena Barra as Olimpia
- Elisabeth Bergalló as Suleiman
- Javier Balas as Archeobot
- Pep Anton Muñoz as King Charles III
- Roser Aldabó as Queen Victoria
- Victor Viedma as Suleiman VIII
- Carlos Latre as Christopher Columbus

=== English Version: ===
- Trevor White as Tad Stones
- Alex Kelly as Sara
- Joseph Balderrama as Mummy/Tupac
- Pippa Bennett-Warner as Ra Amon Ah
- Zaqi Ismail as Jeff
- David Menkin as Belzoni and King Charles III
- Larrisa Murray as Genie
- Erin Austen as Olimpia and Adult Olimpia
- Ferah Ahmet as Suleiman
- Rasmus Hardiker as Archeobot
- Philippa Alexander as Queen Victoria
- Ramon Tikaram as Suleiman VIII

== Production ==
The film is a Telecinco Cinema, Lightbox Animation Studios, Ikiru Films, Anangu Grup, and Tadeo Films AIE production, and it had backing from Mediaset España, Movistar Plus+, and Mediterráneo Mediaset España Group.

== Release ==
The film was released theatrically in Spain on 26 August 2026 by Paramount Pictures, grossing around €0.935 million (165,000 admissions) on its opening day. As of 20 October 2026, the American website Box Office Mojo reports a worldwide gross of $14.42 million.

== Reception ==
Javier Ocaña of El País considered that, unlike in the previous film, the writers upset the comedic balance, with the Mummy character entering into Jar Jar Binks territory in terms of burdensomeness, although the ending is beautiful enough to leave a good impression.

Raquel Hernández Luján of HobbyConsolas gave the film a 70-point score, deeming it to be the best installment of the saga to date and mentioning Petra Martínez among the film's greatest strengths.

Alfonso Rivera of Cineuropa billed the film as "unpretentious romp, which strings together gags, legends and action scenes while offering colourful distractions for the youngest viewers and tossing in nods for the adults".

Pablo Vázquez of Fotogramas rated the film 3 out of 5 stars, lauding its gallery of supporting characters, while pointing out that it falls short of the excellence of the third film.

== Accolades ==
Year	Award	Category	Nominee(s)	Result	Ref.
2026	32nd Forqué Awards	Best Animation Film		Pending	

== See also ==
- List of Spanish films of 2026
