= Enrique Gato =

Spanish filmmaker and 3D/2D animation designer (born 1977)

- Born: Enrique Gato Borregán; 26 April 1977 (age 49); Valladolid, Spain
- Occupations: Director; Producer; Screenwriter

Enrique Gato Borregán (born 26 April 1977) is a Spanish filmmaker and 3D/2D animation designer known as the creator of Tad Stones. With this character (including two CGI animated shorts and four animated features) he won five Goya Awards.

== Biography ==
Gato was born on 26 April 1977 in Valladolid, and grew up in Madrid. Since his childhood, he has had an interest in comics (featuring Mort & Phil, The Adventures of Tintin, Asterix, and Superlópez) and was fascinated by animation and technology, especially action-adventure Hollywood movies from variety of filmmakers, including the works of Steven Spielberg, George Lucas, and Robert Zemeckis. When the first personal computers arrived, he began to make his own videogames with an Amstrad CPC 6128.

In 1995, he started his Informatics Engineering studies at university, where he learned to develop game engines to preview his own works and understand how to make 3D geometric previews using several programs like Maya, 3D Studio Max and Softimage.

While he was in university, he was hired by Artek, a company specializing in computer graphics. Once in there, he learned to work with programs such as TrueSpace and LightWave 3D.

He currently resides in Alcalá de Henares.

== Filmography ==
Year	Title	Work	Details Company
2026	Tad and the Magic Lamp	Director	Lightbox Animation Studios, Ikiru Films, Tadeo Films AIE, Anangu Grup, Telecinco Cinema, Paramount Pictures
2022	Tad, the Lost Explorer and the Emerald Tablet	Director	Lightbox Animation Studios, Ikiru Films, La Tadeopelícula AIE, Anangu Grup, Telecinco Cinema, Paramount Pictures
2017	Tad, the Lost Explorer and the Secret of King Midas	Director	Lightbox Animation Studios, Ikiru Films, El Toro Pictures, Tadeo Jones y el Secreto de Midas AIE, Telecinco Cinema, Telefónica Studios, 4 CATS Pictures, Paramount Pictures
2015	Capture the Flag	Director	Lightbox Animation Studios, Ikiru Films, Los Rockets AIE La Película, Telecinco Cinema, Telefónica Studios, 4 CATS Pictures, Paramount Pictures
2012	La mano de Nefertiti	Executive producer	El Toro Pictures, Lightbox Animation Studios, Ikiru Films
2012	Tad, the Lost Explorer	Director	El Toro Pictures, Lightbox Animation Studios, Ikiru Films, Media Networks, Telecinco Cinema, Telefónica Studios Goya at Best New Director
2007	Tadeo Jones and the Basement of Doom	Director	La Fiesta Producciones
2006	Commandos 3	Animator	Videogame; Pyro Studios
2005	Praetorians	Animator	Videogame; Pyro Studios
2004	Tadeo Jones	Director	La Fiesta Producciones
2002	Superlópez	Director	Personal project
2001	Bicho	Director	Personal project
1999	Pepe pescador	Animatic	Short film to Daniel Martínez Lara
1997	Starship Trappers	Director	Personal project
1994	Toy Jístory	Director	Personal project
