= Michelle Jenner =

Spanish actress

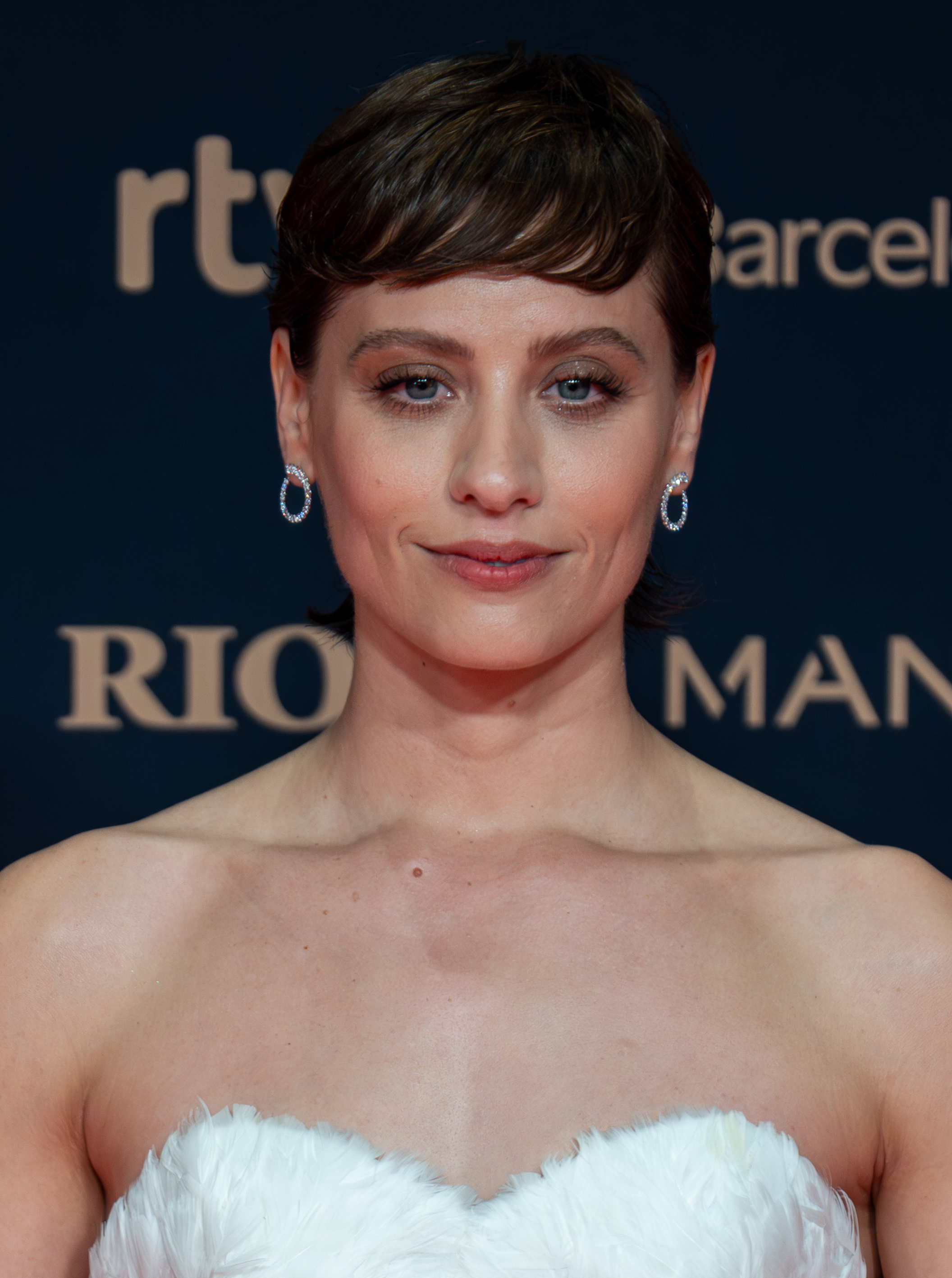
- Jenner in 2026
- Born: Michelle Jenner Husson; 14 September 1986 (age 39); Barcelona, Spain
- Occupation: Actress
- Partner(s): Javier García González (2012–2023)
- Children: 1

Michelle Jenner Husson (born 14 September 1986) is a Spanish actress. She became popular in Spain for her role as Sara in television series Los hombres de Paco. In addition to live action performances, she has also developed a career as a voice actress.

== Biography ==
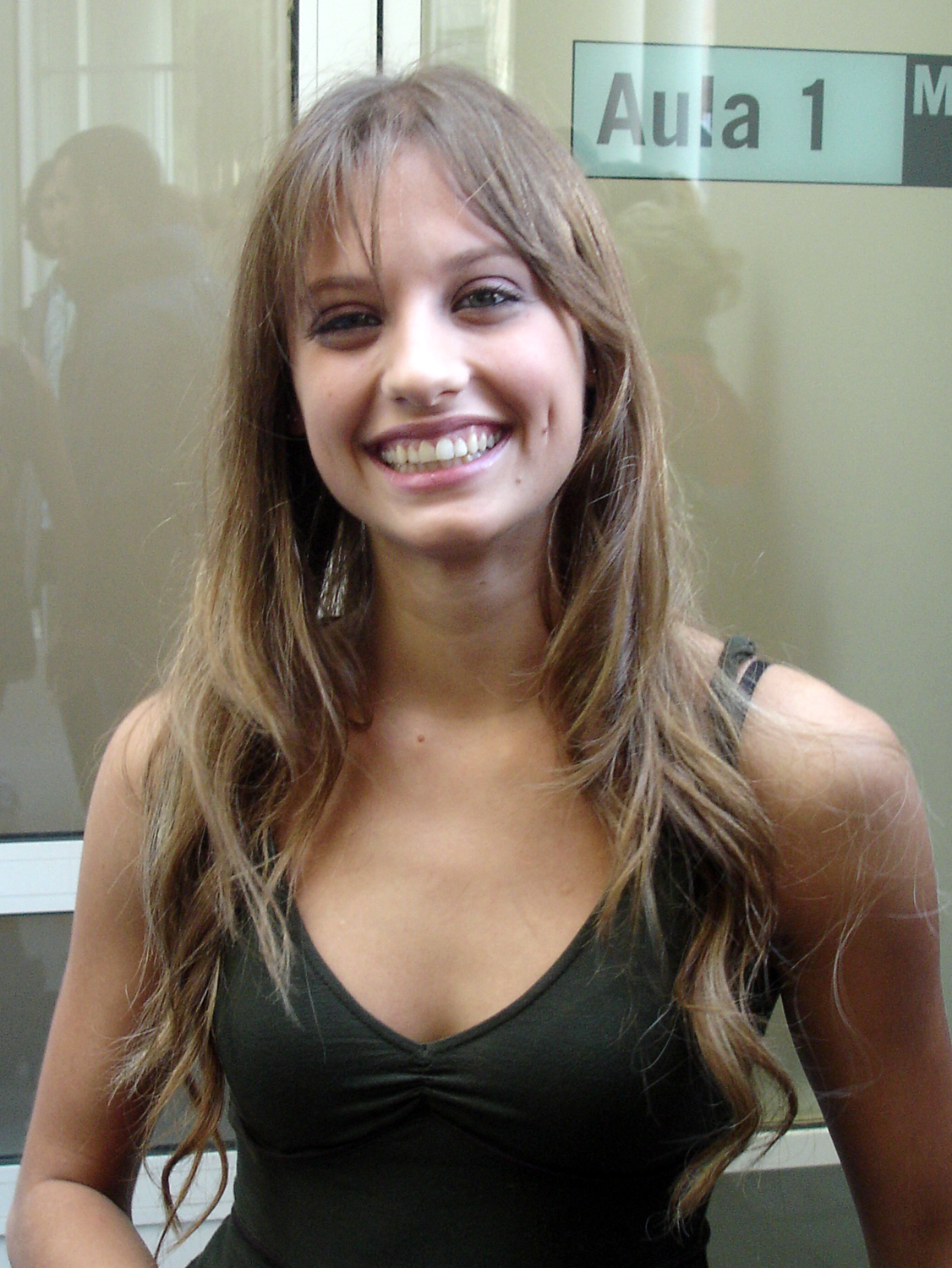
Michelle Jenner in 2007

Michelle Jenner Husson was born on 14 September 1986 in Barcelona, Spain. She is the daughter of Miguel Ángel Jenner Redondo, a Spanish dubbing actor of English descent, and wife Martine Husson, a French actress and music-hall dancer. She has an older brother, David Jenner Husson, also an actor specialized in dubbing. She studied theater, singing and dance at the Company & Company School, and studied acting at the Nancy Tuñon acting school.

== Career ==
=== Acting career ===
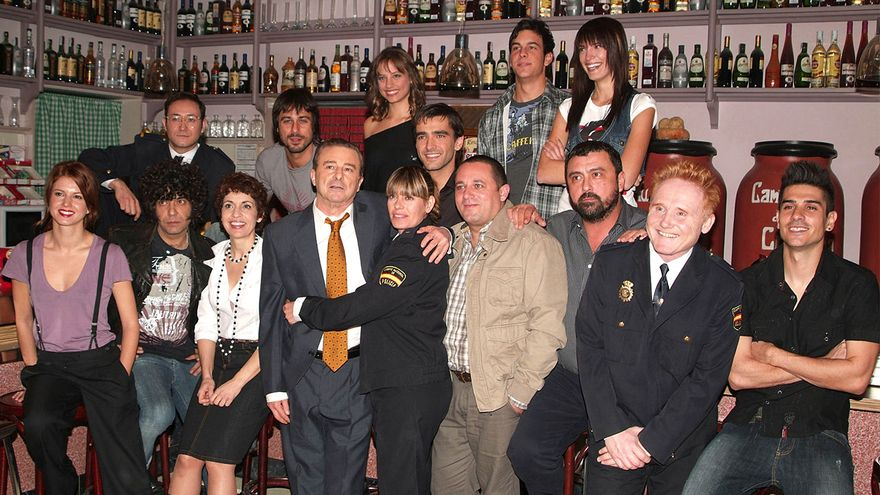
Jenner with Juan Diego, Paco Tous, Pepón Nieto and Hugo Silva as the cast of Los hombres de Paco

Jenner started working in television commercials when she was two years old. Her first work in television was in the 2000 television series El cor de la ciutat, in which she played Alícia. She played Natalia in the 2004 film Nubes de verano, directed by Felipe Vega. She worked as Sara Miranda in the comedy television series Los hombres de Paco from 2005 to 2010. The actress also appeared in the 2009 films Íntimos y extraños, directed by [Rubén Alonso, and in the comedy Spanish Movie, directed by Javier Ruiz Caldeira. She starred in two films in 2011, the first being Don't Be Afraid, directed by Montxo Armendaríz, in which she played Silvia, a character who, as a child, was abused by her father. The actress talked to victims of child abuse to study her role. Jenner also starred in the same year in the science fiction comedy film Extraterrestrial, directed by Nacho Vigalondo, in which she plays Julia, a girl who gets involved in a love quadrangle during an alien invasion in Madrid. She played the lead role, Queen Isabella I of Castille in the 2012 Televisión Española historical drama television series Isabel.

=== Voice acting career ===
Jenner started her voice acting career when she was six years old. Among her works include Hermione Granger in the first four Harry Potter films in Catalan and Spanish, and Giosué in the Italian film Life is Beautiful. She also dubbed the main character of the PlayStation 3 video game Heavy Rain. She voiced Beatrice in the Spanish dub of Cartoon Network miniseries Over the Garden Wall. She dubbed Aloy in Horizon: Zero Dawn (2017) for PS4, and she reprises her role in the DLC Horizon Zero Dawn: The Frozen Wilds.

== Personal life ==
From 2012 to 2023 she was in a relationship with Javier García González, a dog trainer. Michelle and Javier have a child together, Hugo García Jenner, born in July 2019.

== Filmography ==
=== Live-action works ===
==== Television series ====
Year	Title	Role	Notes	Ref.
2000–01	El cor de la ciutat	Alícia		
2005–10; 2021	Los hombres de Paco	Sara Miranda		
2010	Todas las mujeres	Ona		
2012–14	Isabel	Isabel		
2014	Cuéntame un cuento	Miranda		
2015	El Ministerio del Tiempo	Isabel		
2018	La catedral del mar (Cathedral of the Sea)	Mar Estanyol		
2018	El Continental	Andrea Abascal		
2021	La cocinera de Castamar (The Cook of Castamar)	Clara Belmonte		
2022	Los herederos de la tierra (Heirs to the Land)	Mar Estanyol		
2023	Tú también lo harías	Elisa Peña		
2023–present	La casa de papel: Berlín (Money Heist: Berlin)	Keila	Main	

==== Television films ====
Year	Title	Role	Network
2003	Més enllá de les Estrelles	Carmeta	TV3
2010	Inocentes	Sonia	Telecinco
2010	La princesa de Éboli	Ana de Austria	Antena 3

==== Television shows ====
Year	Title	Network
2003	El analista Catódico	LaSexta
2006-2007	Bichos & cía	LaSexta

==== Film ====
Year	Title	Role	Notes	Ref.
2000	Faust: la venganza está en la sangre (Faust: Love of the Damned)	Jade (young)	Feature film debut. Older version of the character is played by Isabel Brook	
2004	Nubes de verano (Summer's Clouds)	Natalia		
2009	Íntimos y extraños	María		
2009	Spanish Movie	Fairy		
2010	Spanish circuit	Eva		
2011	No tengas miedo (Don't Be Afraid)	Silvia		
2011	Extraterrestre (Extraterrestrial)	Julia		
2013	Todas las mujeres (All the Women)	Ona		
2016	La corona partida (The Broken Crown)	Isabella I of Castille		
2016	Tenemos que hablar (We Need to Talk)	Nuria		
2016	Julieta	Beatriz		
2016	Nuestros amantes (Our Lovers)	Irene		
2016	En tu cabeza	Andrea		
2018	Miamor perdido (Mylove Lost)	Olivia		
2018	La sombra de la ley (Gun City)	Sara		
2023	Bird Box Barcelona	Liliana		
2023	Ocho apellidos marroquís (A Moroccan Affair)	Begoña		
2025	El secreto del orfebre (The Goldsmith's Secret)	Celia		
2026	El nido (The Nest)	Marta		

==== Short films ====
Year	Title
2007	Tight
2007	Cinco contra uno
2009	Mala conciencia
2014	Biodiversidad

=== Voice acting ===
==== Film ====
Year	Title	Role	Publisher	Ref.
1997	La vita è bella (Life Is Beautiful)	Giosuè	Spain's Spanish dub	
2001	Harry Potter and the Philosopher's Stone	Hermione Granger	Spain's Spanish dub	
2002	Return to Never Land	Jane	Spain's Spanish dub	
2002	Harry Potter and the Chamber of Secrets	Hermione Granger	Spain's Spanish dub	
2004	Harry Potter and the Prisoner of Azkaban	Hermione Granger	Spain's Spanish dub	
2005	Harry Potter and the Goblet of Fire	Hermione Granger	Spain's Spanish dub	
2012	Las aventuras de Tadeo Jones (Tad, The Lost Explorer)	Sara		
2025	La llum de l'Aisha (The Light of Aisha)	Aisha	Catalan original track and Spain's Spanish dub	
2025	Bella (Awakening Beauty)	Bella		

==== Video games ====
Year	Title	Role	Publisher	Ref.
2010	Heavy Rain	Lauren Winter		
2017	Horizon: Zero Dawn	Aloy	Sony Interactive Entertainment	

==== Television series ====
Year	Title	Role	Notes	Ref.
2020	Memorias de Idhún (The Idhun Chronicles)	Victoria		
