= The Idhun Chronicles =

Spanish animated series

- Spanish promotional poster
- Spanish: Memorias de Idhún
- Genre: Fantasy; Action
- Based on: The Idhún's Memories by Laura Gallego
- Developed by: Laura Gallego; Andrés Carrión
- Screenplay by: Laura Gallego; Andrés Carrión
- Directed by: Maite Ruiz de Austri
- Voices of: Itzan Escamilla; Michelle Jenner; Nico Romero; Sergio Mur; Carlos Cuevas
- Composer: Kaelo Del Río
- Country of origin: Spain
- Original language: Spanish
- No. of seasons: 1
- No. of episodes: 10

Production
- Executive producers: Alexis Barroso; Pilar Blasco
- Editor: Javier Cuesta
- Running time: 25-27 minutes
- Production company: Zeppelin TV

Original release
- Network: Netflix
- Release: September 10, 2020 – January 8, 2021

The Idhun Chronicles (Spanish: Memorias de Idhún) is a Spanish anime-style (also known as “Spanime”) fantasy television series produced by Zeppelin TV for Netflix. It is based on the Memories of Idhun book saga by Laura Gallego.

The series was released globally on September 10, 2020. A second season was released on January 8, 2021, but on the same day, Gallego announced that no agreement had been reached to adapt the second and third books of the trilogy, making Season 2 the final season.

== Synopsis ==
After necromancer Ashran seizes power in Idhun, enforcing his reign of terror through an army of flying snakes, the first battle for the land's freedom will take place on the Earth, where impulsive teenager Jack and aspiring wizard Victoria will face dangerous assassin Kirtash, sent by Ashran to Earth to destroy the Idhunites who fled his tyranny.

== Voice cast ==
=== Spanish ===
- Itzan Escamilla as Jack
- Michelle Jenner as Victoria
- Nico Romero as Shail
- Sergio Mur as Kirtash
- Carlos Cuevas as Alsan
  - David Jenner as Hybrid Alsan / Alexander
- Pep Ribas as Elrion
- Juan Antonio Bernal as Ashran
- María Luisa Solá as Allegra

=== English ===
- Griffin Burns as Jack
- Erika Harlacher as Victoria
- Griffin Puatu as Shail
- Johnny Yong Bosch as Kirtash
- Billy Kametz as Alsan
- Christopher Corey Smith as Elrion
- Joe Ochman as Mago Szish
- Kirk Thornton as Ashran
- Kyle McCarley as Kopt
- Cindy Robinson as Allegra

== Production ==
The series was first announced back in February 2019 by Netflix and was originally set to have 10 episodes in its first season. Author Laura Gallego stated that it would cover the entire first volume La Resistencia (The Resistance).

== Episodes ==
No.	Title	Directed by	Written by	Original release date
Part 1
1	"Limbhad" (Limbhad)	Maite Ruiz de Austri	Laura Gallego and Andrés Carrión	September 10, 2020
Jack is unaware of his connection to Idhun until powerful beings attack his family and kill his parents.
2	"You're Not Yet Ready" (No estás preparado)	Maite Ruiz de Austri	Laura Gallego and Andrés Carrión	September 10, 2020
After Kirtash tries to attack Victoria on Earth, Jack decides to make himself useful for the Resistance, but Alsan worries he could endanger the mission.
3	"The Staff of Ayshel" (El báculo de Ayshel)	Maite Ruiz de Austri	Laura Gallego and Andrés Carrión	September 10, 2020
Kirtash lures the Resistance into a trap, forcing them to make a tough choice in order to save Alsan's life.
4	"Rescue Plans" (Planes de rescate)	Maite Ruiz de Austri	Laura Gallego and Andrés Carrión	September 10, 2020
Shail oversees Jack and Victoria's progress as they master their powers.
5	"Come With Me" (Ven conmigo)	Maite Ruiz de Austri	Laura Gallego and Andrés Carrión	September 10, 2020
With the Resistance in disarray, Jack searches for Alsan and Victoria vows revenge. But Kirtash has other ideas.
Part 2
6	"Re-encounter" (Reencuentros)	Maite Ruiz de Austri	Laura Gallego and Andrés Carrión	January 8, 2021
The Resistance revives when Jack manages to track down Alexander (formerly known as Alsan). But Victoria and Kirtash have unfinished business with each other.
7	"Secrets" (Secretos)	Maite Ruiz de Austri	Laura Gallego and Andrés Carrión	January 8, 2021
Kirtash struggles to find a balance between love and duty and decides to reveal his true nature to Victoria... while setting his sights on killing Jack.
8	"Their True Nature" (Su verdadera naturaleza)	Maite Ruiz de Austri	Laura Gallego and Andrés Carrión	January 8, 2021
Jack and Kirtash wage war for the future of Idhun, both on the battlefield and in Victoria's heart.
9	"The Eye of The Serpent" (El ojo de la serpiente)	Maite Ruiz de Austri	Laura Gallego and Andrés Carrión	January 8, 2021
Ashran unleashes Gerde, forcing Victoria, Jack and Alexander to fight for their lives. Victoria's grandmother reveals a secret.
10	"Victoria's Light" (La luz de Victoria)	Maite Ruiz de Austri	Laura Gallego and Andrés Carrión	January 8, 2021
An unexpected return helps Jack understand his true self, and his and Victoria's shared fate.

== Controversy ==
Laura Gallego, the writer of the books the series is based on, who also contributed in the show's development, wrote a short statement on her personal website objecting to the substitution of previously cast professional (spanish) voice actors by more popular actors who, save for Michelle Jenner, generally lacked experience in dubbing.

== Critical reception ==
Upon its debut, The Idhun Chronicles was met with mixed to negative reception among critics.

Mikel Zorrilla of Espinof criticized the voice acting, advising readers to switch to the "much more consistent" English dub: "What really makes it difficult to take the story seriously is the disconnect among the voices. It's as if each of [the voice actors] gave it a different approach, without any kind of harmony among them, which makes even the very competent Michelle Jenner seem out of place because none of the other voices fit in, individually or as a whole." He also stated: "Its possible grand spectacle nature is presented in a somewhat restrained way. At half throttle."

John Serba of Decider advised viewers to "skip it", claiming that the show doesn't stand out among Netflix's other anime offerings: "There are hundreds of anime series out there, many on Netflix, and The Idhun Chronicles seems destined to be no more than yet another one among the many". He also criticized the characters' lack of charisma and the excessive amount of exposition in the pilot.

Pere Solà Gimferrer of La Vanguardia stated that the first episode was "a disaster on every level, especially narrative", and cited as an example how the murder of Jack's parents at the beginning is recounted later on "with the same drama as if Jack had forgotten his keys or cut himself with a piece of paper while doing his homework."
