= Guadalaviar School =

Colegio Guadalaviar

Location
- Valencia, Spain
- Coordinates: 39.4751°N 0.3556°W

Information
- Type: School in Valencia
- Established: 1959
- Gender: Girls
- Age range: 3 - 18
- Enrolment: 35 - 50
- Education system: IGCSE, A-level, Cambridge English Language Assessment
- Website: colegioguadalaviar.es

Colegio Guadalaviar is an international school in Valencia, Spain. Includes the educational stages from 3 years to high school (3 to 18 years). It was founded in 1959 by a group of parents inspired by saint Josemaría Escrivá he school is regarded as one of the best schools in Comunidad Valenciana. The curriculum includes Dual Baccalaureate . His educational project is based on personalized attention, multilingualism, innovation and collaboration with families.

== Organisation ==
The school is divided into three divisions—Elementary (pre-kindergarten to grade six), Middle (grades seven, and eight, nine and ten), and High School (grades eleven and twelve). The typical class has twenty-five students, with many language classes considerably smaller.

== Mathematics Olympiad ==
The Guadalaviar's Mathematics Olympiad is Valencia's top mathematical problem-solving competition for High School students. The first Guadalaviar's Mathematics Olympiad was held in 1992. It is sponsored by Generalitat Valenciana, City of Arts and Sciences, Valencia CF and Caixabank.

== Rankings ==
According to	2010	2011	2012	2013	2014	2015	2016	2017	2018	2020	
Placed in terms of Spanish University Access Tests	2	2	1	2	1	2	2	1	4	4	
The best schools in Valencia according to El Mundo		2	1	2	2	2	2	1	1	4	3

In 2017 Guadalaviar passed the PISA exams and the results were even better than the means obtained by the centers in Finland, which remained the best performing country overall in Europe.

== Name ==
It is named for Guadalaviar river, a Spanish river which has its source in the Montes Universales in the mountain ranges of the northwesternmost end of the Sistema Ibérico.

== Notable alumni ==
- Laura Gallego García is a Spanish author known by The Idhún's Memories
