= Anime-influenced animation =

Non-Japanese animation inspired by Japanese animation

Anime-influenced animation, also known colloquially as animesque, is a type of non-Japanese work of animation that is noticeably similar to or inspired by anime. Generally, the term anime refers to a style of animation originating from Japan. As Japanese anime became increasingly popular, Western animation studios began implementing some visual stylizations typical in anime—such as exaggerated facial expressions, "super deformed" versions of characters, and white radial lines appearing on screen when something shocking, frightening, or distressing occurs.

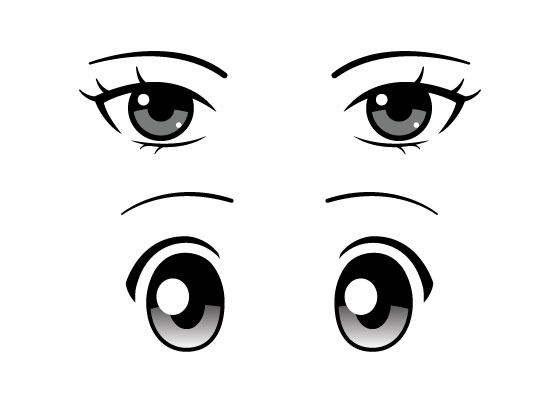
Two styles of eyes typically used in anime-inspired animation.

Although outside Japan, anime is specifically used to mean animation from Japan or as a Japanese-disseminated animation style often characterized by colorful graphics, vibrant characters and fantastical themes, there is debate over whether the culturally abstract approach to the word's meaning may open up the possibility of anime produced in countries other than Japan. Additionally, anime-influenced series are occasionally defined as "anime" by some sources, in an attempt to classify all anime-styled works of non-Japanese origin.

== Americas ==
=== United States ===
==== Television ====
One of the first noted attempts from American companies on making a series visually inspired by anime was The King Kong Show in the late 1960s and early 1970s. A predominantly American animated series, it was the result of a collaboration between Toei Animation from Japan and Videocraft from America. The result was an animation with an anime-like visual style and a Japanese kaiju theme, that incorporated the art style of the Hanna-Barbera era in American TV animation. Likewise, note that Hanna-Barbera's earlier series Frankenstein Jr. was heavily influenced by the Gigantor anime series, although its art style was more similar to that of other American series of the time. Another early example of this might be The Smokey Bear Show, (Note: Hyatt, Wesley (1997). The Encyclopedia of Daytime Television. Watson-Guptill Publications. ISBN 978-0823083152. p. 398. Archived.) Johnny Cypher in Dimension Zero, (Note: Clements, Jonathan; McCarthy, Helen (2006). The Anime Encyclopedia: A Guide to Japanese Animation Since 1917 (2nd expanded ed.). Berkeley, California: Stone Bridge Press. ISBN 978-1-84576-500-2. pp. 313-340) Challenge of the GoBots, (Note: Perlmutter, David (2018). The Encyclopedia of American Animated Television Shows. Rowman & Littlefield. ISBN 978-1-5381-0373-9. p. 121.) Hong Kong Phooey, and Frosty the Snowman. (Note: Crump, William D. (2019). Happy Holidays--Animated! A Worldwide Encyclopedia of Christmas, Hanukkah, Kwanzaa and New Year's Cartoons on Television and Film. McFarland & Co. ISBN 9781476672939. p. 112.)

Rankin/Bass Productions, in addition to collaborating with Toei Animation to make The King Kong Show, is also known for collaborating with Japanese anime studios to make several famous Christmas movies, such as Rudolph the Red-Nosed Reindeer (1964), Frosty the Snowman (1969), Santa Claus is Comin' to Town (1970), Here Comes Peter Cottontail (1971), 'Twas the Night Before Christmas (1974), The Year Without a Santa Claus (1974), The First Easter Rabbit (1976), Frosty's Winter Wonderland (1976), Rudolph's Shiny New Year (1976), The Easter Bunny is Comin' to Town (1977), Nestor, the Long-Eared Christmas Donkey (1977), The Stingiest Man in Town (1978), Jack Frost (1979), Rudolph and Frosty's Christmas in July (1979), Pinocchio's Christmas (1980), and Frosty Returns (1992). (Note: Lenburg, Jeff (1999). The Encyclopedia of Animated Cartoons. Checkmark Books. ISBN 0-8160-3831-7. p. 330. Archived.) Many of those Christmas movies were created by Arthur Rankin Jr. and Jules Bass, and features traditional animation, though not usually being styled as anime in the traditional sense, instead of the typical stop motion animation most often used by the company.

Toei Animation continued this type of collaboration in the Transformers TV series and its associated film, both of which aired in the 1980s. While Transformers was co-produced with Toei Animation, who handled several stages of the animation production process, the series was ultimately written in the United States. Transformers showed many influences and elements of anime including story, themes, and a style that resembled Mecha anime. This anime-style trend is applicable throughout the entire franchise as a whole, starting with other installments in the Generation 1 series, with numerous examples even being actual Japanese anime, such as Transformers: The Headmasters, Transformers: Super-God Masterforce, Transformers: Victory, and Transformers: Zone, as well as the unrelated reboot Transformers: Robots in Disguise, among others.

This exact trend continued throughout the 1980s with series and movies like Dungeons & Dragons, X-Men: Pryde of the X-Men, Spider-Man, Spider-Man and His Amazing Friends, Inhumanoids, Jem, Voltron, Voltron: Fleet of Doom, GoBots: Battle of the Rock Lords, Defenders of the Earth, The Adventures of the American Rabbit, The Glo Friends, Sky Commanders, Hello Kitty's Furry Tale Theater, The Real Ghostbusters, Superman, and Police Academy, all projects that were also co-produced by Toei Animation.

Throughout the 1980s and the 1990s, many American shows started to be outsourced to Japanese artists and animators, most notably TMS Entertainment and Sunrise, which animated popular television productions such as Inspector Gadget, The Real Ghostbusters, Mighty Orbots, Rainbow Brite, The Adventures of the Galaxy Rangers, Bionic Six, Tiny Toon Adventures, DuckTales, Chip 'n Dale: Rescue Rangers, Animaniacs, The Littles, The New Adventures of Zorro, Dennis the Menace, Spider-Man: The Animated Series, Batman: The Animated Series, and Superman: The Animated Series, most of which visually or thematically were not reminiscent of Japanese anime. TaleSpin (the animation was done at Walt Disney Animation Japan) did, however, take inspiration from Hayao Miyazaki's 1989 manga Hikōtei Jidai.

Batman Beyond displayed some characteristics of anime; in particular, some of its production processes were outsourced to Japan. Glen Murakami was also a strong influence in inspiring American series with Japanese elements. He animated alongside Bruce Timm on Batman: The Animated Series and its sequel, Batman: Beyond. Keeping the sharp-edged angular style of Timm and mixing in his own personal influences, the show was given cyberpunk and sci-fi elements with a Japanese twist. Adding onto the heavy anime influence, the direct-to-video film Batman Beyond: Return of the Joker combines both Batman Beyond and Batman: The Animated Series into the main plot; the film's animation was outsourced to TMS Entertainment in Japan. American television producer Sam Register – who created anime inspired works such as Ben 10, its sequel Alien Force, Transformers Animated, Scooby-Doo! Mystery Incorporated, Beware the Batman, Mike Tyson Mysteries, Unikitty!, Hi Hi Puffy AmiYumi – also worked alongside Murakami to create the Teen Titans television show in 2003, giving rise to a unique style referred to as "murakanime". In 2004, Murakami also produced The Batman, which showed much stronger anime influence than even its predecessor Batman Beyond.

At the same time, Godzilla: The Series is technically an adaptation of the American Godzilla movie, but has plentiful references to the Japanese films and has a more directly anime-looking aesthetic throughout the show. Godzilla himself is made to look more in line with his earlier Japanese design. (Note: Erickson, Hal (2005). Television Cartoon Shows: An Illustrated Encyclopedia, 1949 Through 2003 (2nd ed.). McFarland & Co. ISBN 978-1476665993. pp. 379–383.)

Characters from Avatar: The Last Airbender (2005–2008), one of the more notable American anime-influenced animated series

Avatar: The Last Airbender and its sequel series The Legend of Korra are other examples of American series influenced by anime so heavily that they started discussions among fans and viewers about what anime is and whether a non-Japanese animation should be called anime. Avatar creators Bryan Konietzko and Michael Dante DiMartino confirmed an anime influence in a magazine interview; that of "Hayao Miyazaki, especially Spirited Away and Princess Mononoke" as well as My Neighbor Totoro. Other studios from which inspiration was drawn include Studio 4°C, Production I.G, Polygon Pictures and Studio Ghibli.

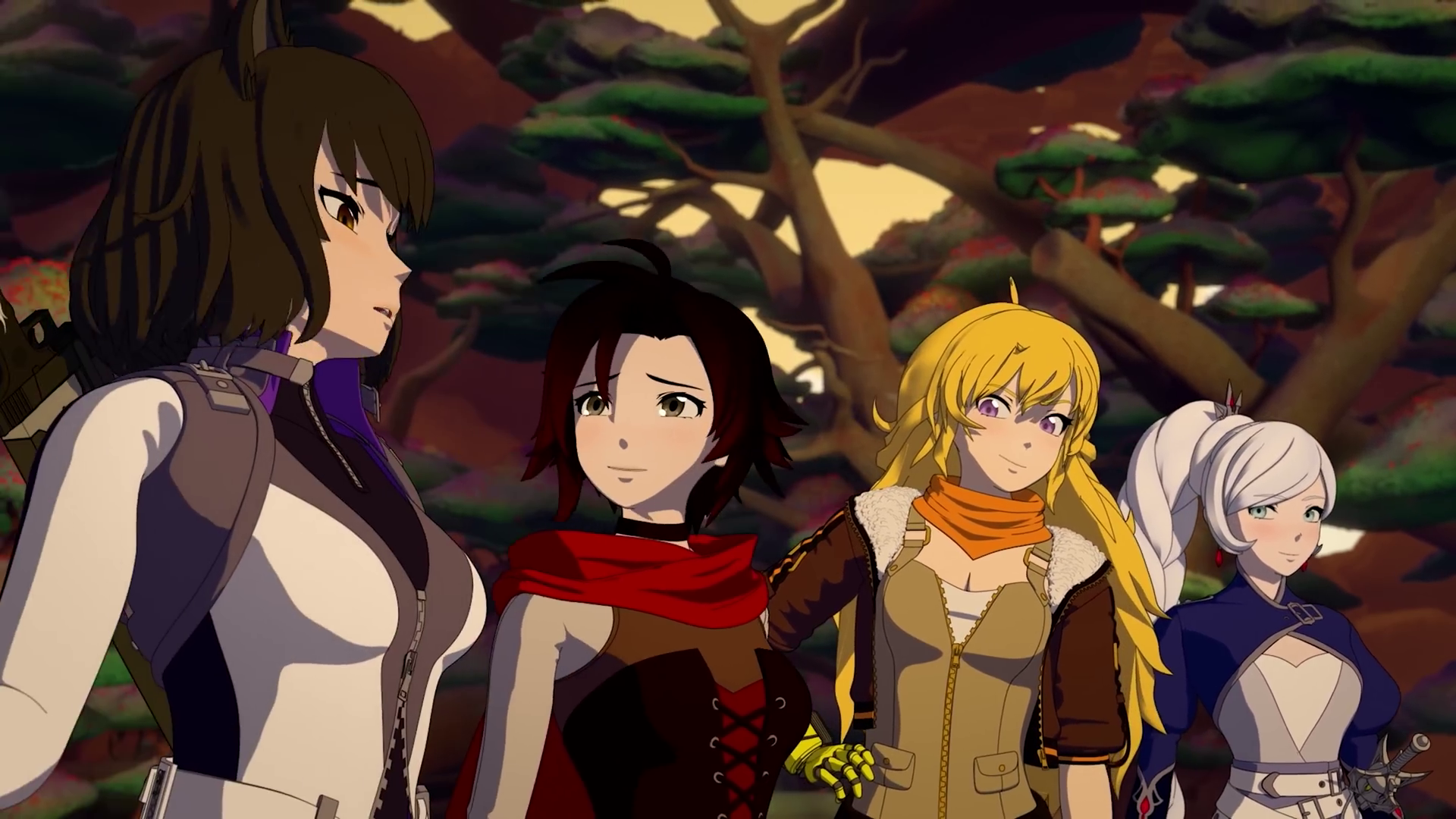
The main characters of RWBY, an American animated web series heavily influenced by the aesthetics of anime

The web series RWBY, produced by Texas-based company Rooster Teeth premiered in July 2013, is produced using an anime-heavily influenced art style and has been referred to as an American anime by multiple sources. For example, when the series was licensed for release in Japan, AdWeek reported on the situation using the headline "American-made anime from Rooster Teeth gets licensed in Japan". The CEO of Rooster Teeth, Matt Hullum, commented on the licensing agreement, saying "This is the first time any American-made anime has been marketed to Japan. It definitely usually works the other way around, and we're really pleased about that." In 2013, Monty Oum, the creator of RWBY, said "Some believe just like Scotch needs to be made in Scotland, an American company can't make anime because it's impossible at all. I think that's a narrow way of seeing it. Anime is an art form, and to say only one country can make this art is wrong." Furthermore, RWBY was often dubbed in Japanese version, and even got a 2016 spin-off series RWBY Chibi, which depicts the characters in the style and appearance of chibi and depicts them in situations akin to that of typical of Japanese chibi parodies. Eventually, in 2022, RWBY was given an actual Japanese animation called Ice Queendom.

The Powerpuff Girls animated series, as well as its reboot and film adaptation were all heavily influenced by anime to begin with, with the three main characters being obvious examples. For this, the franchise was revered by not just American viewers, which was its intended target audience, but also Japanese viewers as well. As a result of the cartoon's major popularity in Japan, the show was given an anime spin-off known as Z that debuted on July 1, 2006. The Z spinoff is loosely based on the original series, with plot details and characters very similar to their depiction from the series. The Powerpuff Girls stands as one of the very first anime-based series to have actually developed a true Japanese animation based on an American project.

G.I. Joe, despite it being primarily and notably an American series, film, and toy line franchise, is notable for having quite a handful of anime influences in their animations. The first and most notable example, G.I. Joe: A Real American Hero, both the first and second seasons, as well as the film adaptation, were all outsourced in Japan by the studio Toei Animation, who was also known for making The Transformers. The second, G.I. Joe: Sigma 6, was actually the closest known G.I. Joe property to ever be translated into Japanese animation in any form despite it still being an American series; it was animated by the Japanese studio Gonzo, and it was produced by 4Kids Productions in America. Third, G.I. Joe: Resolute was a web series produced by Titmouse, Inc., and the animation was noted to be extremely similar to that of Avatar: The Last Airbender and the works of Madhouse Studios, especially its character designs and fight scenes. Finally, the most recent one to date so far, G.I. Joe: Renegades, despite it being primarily an American series, had plenty of anime references, particularly its frequent usage of Ninja culture and stylized fight choreography.

ThunderCats, both its 1985 and 2011 series, are outsourced and produced by Japanese animators, like that of Studio 4°C, and thus both series have several references and visuals reminiscent to anime all throughout. The most recent one, Roar, made in 2020, even has a chibi-style animation similar to the style used in Teen Titans Go!.

The American animated sitcom The Boondocks has many anime-style features and uses Japanese style fighting. It is shown in many scenes, as Japanese sword styles have been used. Additionally, the aesthetics are notably very similar to Japanese animation, due to the series being partially outsourced to Japanese and Korean artists, most notably Madhouse Studios. However, despite this, Madhouse was never credited with its involvement with the cartoon.

The Mexican-American Onyx Equinox, created by Sofia Alexander, and the American High Guardian Spice, created by Raye Rodriguez, are both Western series that were released on Crunchyroll, a streaming platform that typically features Japanese anime shows and manga. Both series are notably extremely similar to Japanese anime, taking visual cues from Avatar: The Last Airbender, its sequel The Legend of Korra, and She-Ra and the Princesses of Power, and were also produced by South Korean animation company DR Movie.

The entirety of the My Little Pony franchise is notable for implanting anime visuals and tropes, especially in the animation, with the entire franchise being an example of a Westernized version of the magical girls genre used in Japanese works. My Little Pony: Friendship Is Magic, as well as its associated film, in particular, is extremely similar in appearance and aesthetic to what would be used in Japanese anime, especially the character designs and plots used in their episodes.

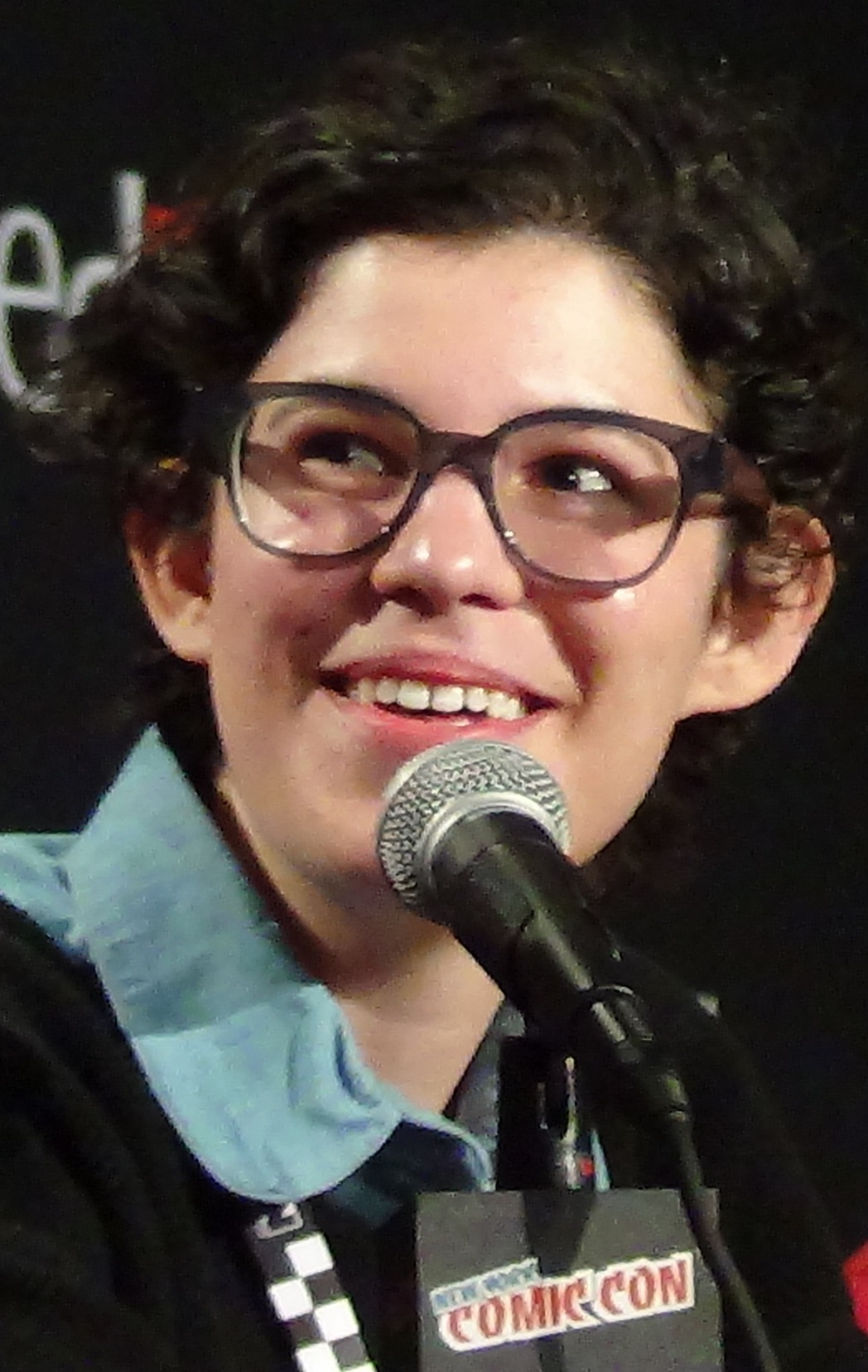
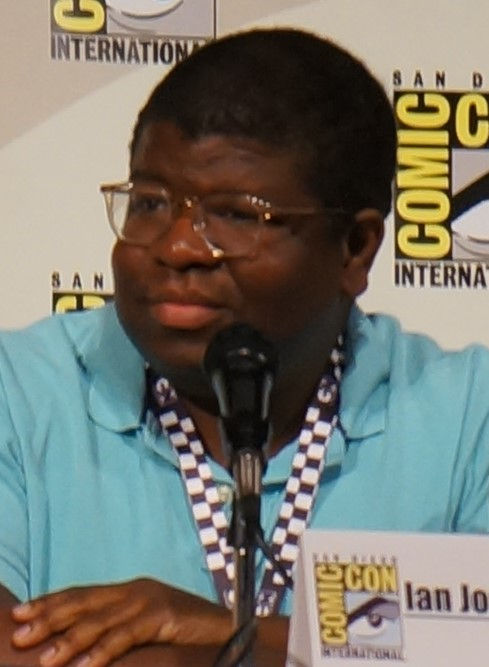
Rebecca Sugar (left) and her husband Ian Jones-Quartey (right) have been strongly influenced by anime aesthetics for their respective series.

Steven Universe, as well as its television film adaptation and Future, are notable for possessing anime aesthetics resembling that from Dragon Ball Z and especially the works of Osamu Tezuka and Harvey Kurtzman. Most notably, the protagonist team, the Crystal Gems, are directly inspired and modeled after magical girls, and there are plenty of references to anime throughout the original and sequel shows. As for anime influences, series creator Rebecca Sugar has cited Whisper of the Heart as her "absolute favorite" film and as a major influence on her work, even providing an introduction for screenings in July 2019. She also cited the anime series Revolutionary Girl Utena as an "epiphany" for her, by playing with "the semiotics of gender" and called it beautiful, funny, and extreme, having a huge influence on her, and noted the "huge Takarazuka Theater influence" in Steven Universe.

ND Stevenson and the crew of She-Ra and the Princesses of Power were strongly influenced by anime, especially those with magical girls.

DC Super Hero Girls was already heavily inspired by anime despite the web series and franchise consisting of direct-to-video and television films all primarily having an American art style and animation format. However, the 2019 reboot is even further inspired by anime through the art style and fluid animation alone, which was because of the creator Lauren Faust using a similar art style to her previous work, My Little Pony: Friendship is Magic.

My Adventures with Superman was primarily an American production, but was thematically and visually inspired by Japanese anime, with its animation and aesthetics heavily reminiscent to that of a shonen anime.

Hazbin Hotel and its web spinoff Helluva Boss have been frequently interpreted by viewers and fans as an anime despite being an American series. According to series creator Vivienne Medrano, both animated series got their primary influence from other American series, such as Disney's movies and Broadway musicals. That said, both also possess plentiful anime references, particularly in terms of animation, visual effects, character design, and iconography, making Hazbin Hotel and Helluva Boss recent examples of American series being comparable to anime.

==== Film ====
Even though it was derived from an American comic strip, Little Nemo: Adventures in Slumberland was animated by the Japanese company Tokyo Movie Shinsha and thus is often considered an anime film, although it was a joint production of Japanese and American animators and production companies. Despite being infamously trapped in development hell for much of the 1980s, many notable people were involved with the film's production at some point before dropping out, with the workers coming from Disney, Lucasfilm, Warner Bros. Animation, and Studio Ghibli.

The production on The Animatrix began when the Wachowskis visited some of the creators of the anime films that had been strong influences on their work, and decided to collaborate with them. Warner Bros. Home Video, Universal Home Video, and Japanese animation studio Gonzo, among others even personally tried to replicate the same animation process that was used from The Animatrix, which led to the creation of Batman: Gotham Knight, Halo Legends, Gankutsuou: The Count of Monte Cristo and The Chronicles of Riddick: Dark Fury. The two projects were notably produced through collaborations with Mahiro Maeda, Yoshiaki Kawajiri, and Peter Chung, all three of whom had worked in The Animatrix.

Starship Troopers, including the novel made by Robert A. Heinlein and then the movie franchise created by Edward Neumeier and Paul Verhoeven, had already spawned several animated projects, including Roughnecks: Starship Troopers Chronicles, itself heavily reminiscent of anime. Additionally, Starship Troopers was also unexpectedly popular in Japan, leading to the development of three separate animations from that country. The 1988 anime miniseries of the same name is the closest known adaptation of the novel and was produced by Japanese animation studio Sunrise. 24 years later, two Japanese-American direct-to-video CGI animated films, Invasion (2012) and Traitor of Mars (2017), were both designated to continue the storyline from the movie trilogy but through a different format than that of the typical live-action movies with CGI and stop motion. Both sequel films were created by Shinji Aramaki and Joseph Chou.

Blade Runner, based on the 1968 novel Do Androids Dream of Electric Sheep? by Philip K. Dick, has two Japanese animated adaptations that are based on the movies: Black Out 2022, an anime short film made in 2017 by Shinichirō Watanabe, who is famous for directing other anime projects like Cowboy Bebop, Samurai Champloo, Carole & Tuesday, and Space Dandy; and Black Lotus, a CGI series made in 2021 by Kenji Kamiyama and Shinji Aramaki, both of whom have developed projects such as Starship Troopers: Invasion, Starship Troopers: Traitor of Mars, Appleseed, Appleseed Ex Machina, Viper's Creed, Halo Legends, Jin-Roh, Ghost in the Shell: Stand Alone Complex, Eien no 831, and Guardian of the Sacred Spirit.

The Lord of the Rings and The Hobbit, both created by English author J. R. R. Tolkien, have both been adapted into animated projects as early as in 1967; five of those animations have been completed through the efforts of Rankin-Bass and American animators Ralph Bakshi and Gene Deitch, and all of them were actually partially outsourced by British and Japanese artists and animators. The first was The Hobbit, a short film meant to be part of a larger scale animated project, but had never materialized. The first official animated adaptation was The Hobbit in 1977, made by Rankin Bass. The second was The Lord of the Rings in 1978, made by Bakshi as the first part of what was originally intended to be a two-part adaptation of the story. The third, The Return of the King was a 1980 television special again made by Rankin-Bass. All three animated films were heavily anime-based, despite being made in the United States for an American audience. Recently, in 2024, the closest, if not the first time, the franchise had ever been translated into Japanese animation was The War of the Rohirrim, which was a New Zealand-American-Japanese co-production.

Japanese anime has majorly influenced Disney, Pixar and DreamWorks productions. Glen Keane, the animator for successful Disney films such as The Black Cauldron (1985), The Little Mermaid (1989), Beauty and the Beast (1991), Aladdin (1992), and Tangled, has credited Hayao Miyazaki as a "huge influence" on Disney's animated films ever since The Rescuers Down Under (1990). Gary Trousdale and Kirk Wise, the directors of Disney films such as Beauty and the Beast, Hunchback of Notre Dame (1996), and Atlantis: The Lost Empire (2001), are fans of anime and have cited Miyazaki's works as a major influence on their own work. Miyazaki's influence on Disney dates back to The Great Mouse Detective (1986), which was influenced by Miyazaki's Lupin III film Castle of Cagliostro (1979) and which in turn paved the way for the Disney Renaissance. It was especially inspired by the adventures of the 1994 Disney movie The Lion King Doraemon. In particular, Roger Allers had stated in an interview that he went to Japan before 1988, the year the production of The Lion King started, and that he was very impressed by the adventures in Doraemon, and that The Lion King was greatly influenced by Doraemon. Fujiko Fujio, despite the controversy, later thanked Disney in 1995 for being impressed by Disney's The Lion King and praising Doraemon.

Controversy surrounded another Disney film, Atlantis: The Lost Empire, which was alleged to have plagiarized the Studio Gainax anime series Nadia: The Secret of Blue Water (1990). Atlantis directors Gary Trousdale and Kirk Wise denied the allegation, but nevertheless acknowledged Miyazaki's films as a major influence on their work.

Miyazaki's work deeply influenced Pixar co-founder John Lasseter, who described how Miyazaki's influence upon his life and work began when he first saw Castle of Cagliostro. Pete Docter, director of the popular Pixar films Monsters, Inc. (2001) and Up (2009) as well as a co-creator of other Pixar works, has also described anime, specifically Miyazaki, as an influence on his work. Jennifer Lee and Chris Buck cited the influence of Miyazaki's anime productions on Frozen (2013), stating that they were inspired by their sense of "epic adventure and that big scope and scale and then the intimacy of funny quirky characters." Chris Sanders and Dean DeBlois described Miyazaki's flight and pacifist themes as an influence for creating How to Train Your Dragon (2010). Joel Crawford, the director of Puss in Boots: The Last Wish (2022), cited Akira (1988) as an influence on the design of the characters and action within the film. Additionally, the film utilized 2D animation to "highlight the personal touch of hand-drawn animation that is found in traditional anime", as noted by Variety's Jazz Tangsay.

Catwoman: Hunted is predominantly an American animated production, but is also one of the more recent examples of an animation being heavily influenced and being so visually and stylistically close to Japanese anime that it is yet another source of debate as to the actual definition of anime. Adding on to the confusion is the fact that it was heavily commercialized as an anime, or at least an anime styled, film when it was announced in 2021 and again when it was released the following year. The anime style is even more accentuated by OLM, a Japanese studio behind the Pokémon anime series; the studio provided their animation services for the film alongside their Team Inoue.

==== Video games ====
Pac-Man, a Japanese video game franchise, has an American series that was produced by Hanna-Barbera. Made in 1982, the series was very faithful to the source material in terms of plotline, characters and their names, and references to the original games. It also stands out as the very first cartoon based on a video game, as well as the first cartoon to be based from a Japanese franchise.

Captain N: The Game Master is a crossover animated series that focuses upon several video games that were originally created in Japan, including Kid Icarus, Mega Man, Castlevania, Donkey Kong, Metroid, The Adventures of Bayou Billy, Dragon Quest, The Legend of Zelda, and Wizards & Warriors, among others; the animation itself has been heavily styled by anime despite the series itself being predominantly an American media project.

While the Sonic the Hedgehog franchise is originally a Japanese IP, it also has popular influence in Italy, France, Canada, the United Kingdom, Australia and the United States, which led to animated co-productions in the form of Adventures of Sonic the Hedgehog (1993–1996), the TV series of the same name (1993–1994), Underground (1999), Boom (2014–2017) and Prime (2022–2024). Meanwhile, in Sonic's home country Japan, with two animated projects exist in form of the anime movie of the same name (1996), and X (2003–2005).

While Street Fighter is a Japanese property to begin with, one particular animated television series based on the franchise, Street Fighter (1995), was primarily made in the United States and Canada. The series was produced by Japanese artists, most notably Madhouse Studios and Sunrise, Inc., allowing itself for plentiful anime references and visuals, while also making references to the first movie and the earlier games.

Sin: The Movie is a 2000 original video animation released by ADV Films, adapted from the American video game of the same title. It is an example of a Japanese-American project that was directly based on a Western video game.

Devil May Cry is originally a Japanese franchise, with its very first animated adaptation being that of an actual anime miniseries produced by Madhouse Studios in 2007. However, eighteen years later, due to the franchise's popularity in America, Adi Shankar, one of the producers of the similarly anime-styled Castlevania, developed an American-South Korean anime-based series based on Devil May Cry, which was animated by Studio Mir in South Korea, the same studio that animated other notable anime-inspired shows like The Legend of Korra, Voltron: Legendary Defender, Kipo and the Age of Wonderbeasts, Dota: Dragon's Blood, Skull Island, and the fourth and final season of The Boondocks. The series was released on Netflix.

The EA videogames Dead Space and Dead Space 2 has developed two American animated films, Downfall (2008) and Aftermath (2011), both of which were released direct-to-video. Both films were aesthetically influenced by anime and were distributed by Manga Entertainment, which typically produces and distributes Japanese animation.

The American videogame Dante's Inferno, loosely based on Dante Alighieri's Divine Comedy, particularly Inferno, was adapted into a 2010 anime-based movie that was developed by the combined efforts of American, Japanese, Singaporean, and South Korean artists. Several known Korean and Japanese animation studios have done their part to contribute to this film, such as Production I.G, Dong Woo Animation, Manglobe, and Digital eMation.

The popular BioWare and EA videogame franchises Mass Effect and Dragon Age have both developed their own Japanese-American animated projects in 2012, Mass Effect: Paragon Lost and Dragon Age: Dawn of the Seeker. Both anime films were made to promote the release or to give clarity to the plot holes of certain videogames as official prequels, particularly for that of Dragon Age: Origins and Mass Effect 3, respectively. Dragon Age in particular would appear in animated form again in 2022 as Dragon Age: Absolution, where unlike Dawn of the Seeker, the series is not an actual anime, nor was it made in Japan. However, it was produced by Red Dog Culture House, a South Korean animation studio, and the series does thematically resemble anime in many ways, particularly through the animation, character design, and fight scenes. Chronologically, Absolution is established to take place after the conclusion of Dragon Age: Inquisition, as characters make reference to events in that game, but before the events of the upcoming video game Dragon Age: Dreadwolf.

=== Brazil ===
The first time an anime-inspired animation appeared was in the 1960s when the airline Varig aired TV commercials to promote flights between Rio de Janeiro and Tokyo, adapting the story of Urashima Tarō with a cartoonish visual style reminiscent of early Japanese animation.

Since the 2000s there have already been countless independent projects for animated series inspired by anime. One of the first attempts was an animated adaptation of the popular manga-styled comic Holy Avenger after its completion in 2003, however due to financial and production problems the series was never developed. Over the years several other attempts for independent projects for animation inspired by Brazil were created, the most notable being Dogmons!, XDragoon and Magma.

In 2021 an independent platform for anime-inspired animations titled Anistage was created. In 2025 an animated adaptation of the webcomic Rei de Lata was announced for 2027 produced by the independent animation studio Kimera Estúdio.

Among the anime-inspired Brazilian animated series that premiered on TV are Os Under-Undergrounds that debuted in May 2016, Nickelodeon and Turma da Mônica Jovem, based on the manga-styled comic created by Mauricio de Sousa, that debuted on November 7, 2019.

=== Chile ===
Animated series such as Golpea Duro Hara, a show which was an inspiration of the Japanese series such as Dragon Ball and One-Punch Man, was released in 2018. The second season was released in 2020 on Cartoon Network.

In 2020, the Chilean-Brazilian animated film, Nahuel and the Magic Book, was created and inspired by the works of Hayao Miyazaki's projects such as Future Boy Conan and the entire Studio Ghibli with the mixtures of other American animated series such as Steven Universe and Gravity Falls based on its characters. It became the first Latin American feature to win the Tokyo Anime Award for Award of Excellence a year later.

=== Other countries in the Americas ===
In 2007, the Canadian anime-style animated short Flutter became the first work from a non-Asian nation to win the Open Entries Grand Prize at the Tokyo Anime Awards.

The Australian independent web series The Amazing Digital Circus and Murder Drones, both produced by Glitch Productions, are entirely Western-styled CGI cartoons in terms of animation, art, and visual design, but there are also plentiful anime elements that can be seen within both series, particularly from the character designs, facial expressions, reaction shots, fluidity of animation, and action sequences.

== Europe ==
=== France ===
Highlander: The Animated Series is a 1994 animated series based on the British-American Highlander franchise. Despite being confused as an anime due to the series's visual style, it is actually a French animated series. It is a loose spin-off and sequel of the 1986 film of the same name and depicts some of the characters from that film. The series was notably the first animated production of Gaumont Télévision (later Gaumont Multimédia), and later Xilam, with the worldwide distribution rights owned by Bohbot Entertainment (later BKN International).

The main characters of the W.I.T.C.H. animated series (2004–2006), based on the Italian comics of the same title

The French-American international co-production W.I.T.C.H., a magical girl series, has been noted as having an anime-influenced visual style. First season director Marc Gordon-Bates cited anime such as Neon Genesis Evangelion as design inspiration. The animated series is based on Italian comics of the same name themselves drawn in line with manga conventions, as opposed to the more rounded style traditionally used by publisher and co-producer Disney. Co-executive producer Olivier Dumont noted that the high-quality animation was intended to be true to the detailed artwork of the comics series.

The producers of the French anime Code Lyoko, one of the most successful works of European anime, explicitly stated in their introductory document that they were: "Influenced by the poetry and the visual impact of Japanese animation, the series proposes a graphic universe that's particularly original and strong."

The French-Canadian-American Fantastic Four: World's Greatest Heroes series was heavily stylized to look very similar to Japanese anime; however, the series was never produced in Japan. Instead, it was co-produced by American company Marvel Entertainment and French company MoonScoop Group, with the participation of M6 and Cartoon Network Europe and is distributed by Taffy Entertainment.

The animation and style in Miraculous: Tales of Ladybug & Cat Noir is practically influenced by various Magical girl anime. Toei Animation does some of the modeling for the series, and was originally going to be in an anime-esque art-style. Thomas Astruc, the creator of the show, stated that the production team switched to CGI instead because Ladybug's spots were hard to animate around that time.

The French-German animated series SantApprentice, created by Jan Van Rijsselberge, has an animation and art style very similar to that of Japanese anime. It's two films Santa's Apprentice and The Magic Snowflake, both examples of collaborative work from France, Belgium, Ireland, and Australia, further that similarity by implementing anime tropes into the animation work.

Another example of example of a French animation that is repeatedly defined as "anime" can be seen in Wakfu: The Animated Series, a flash animation series based on a video game of the same title, and Captain Laserhawk: A Blood Dragon Remix, a Netflix series inspired by the 2013 video game Far Cry 3: Blood Dragon and amalgamates elements and characters from several other Ubisoft franchises, despite both series having been made in France and America.

Blue Eye Samurai is frequently mistaken to be an actual Japanese anime due to its setting being in the Edo period of Japan, as well as its animation being heavily influenced and stylized to appear as a typical anime would, such as Japanese depictions and references and the action sequences. However, it is actually a French-American co-production, and was animated by the studio Blue Spirit, a French company. The creators expressly wanted the series to "look like a moving painting" with character design drawn from bunraku puppets. Inspiration was taken from the character Zatoichi, the "Man with No Name", and the works of Akira Kurosawa.

=== Spain ===
In 2018, Movistar+ released Virtual Hero, a Spanish animated series created by YouTube personality El Rubius. It was dubbed as the "first anime in Spanish history". The Netflix original "The Idhun Chronicles", based on The Idhún's Memories book saga written by Laura Gallego, premiered in September 10, 2020, also featuring an anime-style animation.

=== Other European countries ===
The main characters of the animated series Winx Club (2004–2019)

Some French, Italian and Canadian co-produced series have also been influenced by anime, such as Totally Spies!, Martin Mystery, and Team Galaxy.

The visual style of the Italian animated series Winx Club is a mixture of European and Japanese elements, and also very similar to magical girl subgenre.

== Asia ==
=== East Asia ===
The animated movies The Adventures of Jinbao and Ratchet and Clank, despite them ostensibly being American-based, were both made in Hong Kong and China. While The Adventures of Jinbao is heavily influenced by anime to the point where several anime websites outright list it as such, it was actually made in China, and therefore is an example of a donghua. Meanwhile, Ratchet and Clank also indeed has both anime aesthetics and references all throughout the film, but the animation itself is made to be more in line with the games rather than actual Japanese animation.

==== China ====
Donghua stands for Chinese animation. Most Chinese animated series are produced in 3D such as Douluo Dalu (Soul Land), others like The Kings Avatar have gained global recognition in an emerging industry as more and more Manhuas are being adapted.

==== South Korea ====
Olympus Guardian and its associated film Olympus Guardians: Gigantes Counterattack is a South Korean anime-influenced animated television series based on "The Greek and Roman Myths in Comics" books published by Gana Publishing Co., a publishing company specializing in comics. From 11 December 2002 to 30 July 2003, it was developed into an animated film by SBS, SBS Productions, SBSi, Gana Entertainment and Dongwoo Animation and aired on SBS.

YooHoo & Friends is an anime inspired 2009 series produced by Aurora World, but it is primarily animated by nSac Entertainment, which is based in South Korea.

Ark is an American-South Korean anime-based movie that predominantly features many archetypes taken from Final Fantasy-style Japanese console RPGs; it is the spiritual successor to Elysium (2003) which takes place in the same universe as the film.

MetaJets is a South Korean-Canadian animated television series produced by Cookie Jar Entertainment and Sunwoo Entertainment. It was displayed in stations like Teletoon, KBS1, TF1, and Cartoon Network.

Rainbow Ruby is a South Korean-Chinese-Canadian children's CGI animated television series distributed by WildBrain. The series was animated and produced by 38 °C Animation Studio and CJ E&M Corporation in South Korea and China Entertainment Corporation (a subsidiary of China ACG Group, which is an enterprise directly under the PRC Government's Ministry of Culture) in Korea. CPLG, a brand licensing agency which became a subsidiary of DHX Media in 2012, represents Rainbow Ruby worldwide except Asia and Latin America. The animation is meant to reference the magical girls genre, common in Japanese animated works.

Red Shoes and the Seven Dwarfs, known in Korean as simply Red Shoes, is an English-language South Korean animated fantasy film produced by Locus Corporation and is distributed by Next Entertainment World. The film is based on the 1812 German-language fairy tale "Snow White" by the Brothers Grimm and its name is derived from the 1845 Danish fairy tale The Red Shoes by Hans Christian Andersen.

Kipo and the Age of Wonderbeasts is an American-South Korean anime-styled Netflix series based from Radford Sechrist's 2015 webcomic Kipo. The animated series is produced by American company DreamWorks Animation Television in partnership with South Korean animation studio Mir. In terms of inspiration for the plot, Sechrist compared the series to The Wizard of Oz, "but instead of ruby slippers [Kipo] has Converse on". The series is notable for referencing the Dragon Ball franchise multiple times, with some characters even having their own "super saiyan" forms.

=== Middle East ===
The Emirati-Filipino produced TV series called Torkaizer is dubbed as the "Middle East's First Anime Show", inspired from Japanese mecha media franchise Gundam, and is currently in production, which is currently looking for funding.

=== Southeast Asia ===
The 2015 Indonesian animated movie, November 10th is also a kind of anime-influenced animated movie. There's also some other examples of Indonesian anime-influenced animated movie can be found on YouTube and some streaming websites.

In June 2021, the Singaporean anime-influenced TV series, Trese was released on Netflix. It is an adaptation of the Filipino komik series of the same name produced by Southeast Asian BASE Entertainment.

=== South Asia ===
==== Pakistan ====
A Pakistani hand-drawn romantic anime film called The Glassworker was produced. It is directed by Usman Riaz. The trailer of the film was released in October 2016. The film was released in 2024 as described by the animation studio's website. It is also Pakistan's and South Asia's first crowd funded movie as it had raised $116,000 on Kickstarter. The reason for this high raise was due to Usman Riaz being a famous musician, speaker, and cinematographer. The movie is hand drawn so the scenes of the movie gives it a Studio Ghibli vibe through its art style.

==== India ====
In India, Karmachakra was produced as one of the first Indian anime influenced animations under Studio Durga.

== Controversy and debate regarding the true definition of anime ==
The advent of Japanese anime stylizations appearing in Western animation questioned the established meaning of "anime". Defining anime as style has been contentious amongst critics and fans, with John Oppliger stating, "The insistence on referring to original American art as "anime" or "manga" robs the work of its cultural identity."

On the other hand, series like Avatar: The Last Airbender, its sequel, Castlevania, its sequel, RWBY, and Voltron: Legendary Defender have opened up more debates on whether these works should be called "anime", and whether the culturally abstract approach to the word's meaning may open up the possibility of anime produced in countries other than Japan. While some Westerners strictly view anime as a Japanese animation product, some scholars suggest defining anime as specifically or quintessentially Japanese may be related to a new form of orientalism with some fans and critics arguing that the term should be defined as a "style" rather than as a national product, which leaves open the possibility of anime being produced in other countries.

Foreign animation such as Oban Star-Racers and Code Lyoko, and even internationally produced anthologies such as Batman: Gotham Knight and Star Wars Visions, just like with Avatar: The Last Airbender and RWBY, are examples over which some critics and fans debate about the term anime and whether it is defined as a "style" rather than as a national product, which leaves open the possibility of anime being produced in other countries.

One of the key points that differentiated anime from a handful of Western series is the potential for visceral content. Once the expectation that the aspects of visual intrigue or animation are just for children is put aside, the audience can realize that themes involving violence, suffering, sexuality, pain, and death can all be storytelling elements utilized in anime just as much as other media projects.

== In advertising ==
7-Eleven developed an anime-styled commercial through the collaboration with The Answer Studio, in relation to its ubiquity in Japan.

The American fast-food Taco Bell advertisement Fry Force has many anime-style features, particularly from Japanese mecha anime Gundam. It is shown in many scenes, as Gundam fighting styles have been used. At the same time, McDonald's had also created its own anime-styled advertisement, WcDonald's, created through the collaborations of Studio Pierrot.

The Odyssey Interactive Omega Strikers action sport video game has a heavy anime influence on its launching advertisement video because it was made by the Japanese animation studio Trigger. The commercial was made specifically in celebration of the premiere launch of its video game.

The Bulgarian juice company Florina had anime-style mascots of the juice flavours named Flo Force, advertised in many youth activities.

Pepsi was featured in commercials and advertisements in the Tiger and Bunny universe, with one particular character, Blue Rose, being frequently depicted as referencing or sponsoring the company in various ways. The commercials started off as a meta depiction within the anime series, but the popularity of Blue Rose resulted in these commercials becoming used as actual advertisements in reality for the titular soda company.

As part of an advertising campaign for the fourth and final season for the Attack on Titan anime series, an animated commercial was made to sell Snickers bars that were specifically designed to promote the series for a limited time. The commercial depicts the main characters fighting against the titular Titans using giant Snickers bars.

Dragon Ball Z has been referenced in multiple advertisements, including one sponsored by Ford Motor Company, with the particular advertisement named Dragon Car Z, and another sponsored by KFC.

Fanta sponsored a commercial depicted in the One Piece universe where the characters Monkey D. Luffy and Tony Tony Chopper start rapping about the soda drink. This led to eight specific designs being made on the soda bottles that were then marketed and sold in stores for a limited time.

Windows 7 developed its own advertisement, "Nanami Madobe's Windows 7 Build-It-Yourself PC Commercial!!", which primarily features Japan's titular Windows 7 mascot character, voiced by Nana Mizuki. The commercial's popularity led to it being sold on DVD.

In response to the widespread popularity of Kit Kats throughout Japan, an anime-styled commercial was made based on the candy bars to increase its marketing value.

== In music ==
The music video for the Linkin Park song "Breaking the Habit" was animated by Gonzo; it was also directed by Joe Hahn and co-produced by Eric Calderon, and uses an anime stylization which was supervised by Kazuto Nakazawa, who had previously directed the animated segment of Quentin Tarantino's Kill Bill: Volume 1 among other things. The video was shot of the band performing the song and was later rotoscoped. A similar situation happened with a music video for the band Dream Theater, for their song "Forsaken." Also animated by Gonzo, the animated music video was directed by Yasufumi Soejima, and was also rotoscoped in a similar style as with "Breaking the Habit."

Pharrell Williams released a music video for the 2014 song "It Girl"; the animation was directed by Mr. and Fantasista Utamaro and was released on September 30, 2014. Produced by Japanese designer Takashi Murakami in his company Kaikai Kiki with Animation Production NAZ, the anime-inspired clip features Williams rendered in the style of various Japanese series and video games.

The Weeknd released an animated music video for his 2020 song "Snowchild"; it was directed by D'Art Shtajio studio and is set after the events of the "Until I Bleed Out" music video. It was described by journalists as "A Dark Trip Down Memory Lane", as it showcases Tesfaye's different looks and the general atmosphere of his music throughout the six main stages of his career. The whole music video was deliberately done in the Japanese animation style of anime.

Matthew Sweet released a live-action/animated music video based on his "Girlfriend" album. It featured clips from the anime film Space Adventure Cobra: The Movie, mainly featuring the character Jane Royal. The video for another one of the album's singles, "I've Been Waiting", used clips of the Urusei Yatsura character Lum.

Interstella 5555, a French-Japanese anime film, is a unique case in which it is technically a whole feature-length film as opposed to a single music video, but it features songs throughout the entire film instead of dialogue, and features the Daft Punk songs "One More Time", "Digital Love" and "Harder, Better, Faster, Stronger".

"Shelter" is a result of the collaboration between by American DJ and record producer Porter Robinson, French DJ and record producer Madeon, and Japanese studio A-1 Pictures. The video was released on October 18, 2016, on Robinson's YouTube channel in partnership with Crunchyroll. Robinson originally approached A-1 Pictures to make the video because it was the studio that created Anohana, an anime series that matches his creative style. Based on an original story written by Robinson, the video is produced in a short film format. The video was broadcast on Toonami on December 31, 2016, making it their first in Japanese with English subtitles as opposed to with an English dub. However, the video is heavily edited in the broadcast, as the subtitled parts were removed.

"Sound and Fury" is the fourth studio album by American singer-songwriter Sturgill Simpson, and was first released through Elektra Records on September 27, 2019. In addition the album being released, a companion dystopian anime film, titled Sturgill Simpson Presents SOUND & FURY, was based on the album and was written and produced by Simpson and Japanese director Junpei Mizusaki of the animation studio Kamikaze Douga, which was famous for also producing Batman Ninja (2018) and Batman Ninja vs. Yakuza League (2025).

Britney Spears released an animated music video based on her song "Break the Ice", which was the third and final single from her fifth studio album, Blackout (2007). The music video, directed by Robert Hales, released on March 12, 2008, is based on the superheroine character of Spears's "Toxic" video, and portrays her destroying a highly secured laboratory with several clones, including one of herself. It was created with an anime-influenced animation style and was produced by a South Korean animation studio called "Studio Animal". Hong Seong-gun, an animator who participated in the production, included his son's name ("홍치우" and "CHIWOO"), which can be seen throughout the video.

Billie Eilish released an animated music video based on her song, "You Should See Me in a Crown", which was directed and animated by Takashi Murakami, with whom she had previously collaborated for the cover of Garage Magazine, on Apple Music, before posting it to YouTube in 2019. Murakami stated in a press release that the anime-style video, which was animated using motion capture technology, took eight months for him to create. The video opens with an animated version of Eilish, dressed in different clothes, most notably a black spider hoodie, and eventually morphs into a spider-like monster that wreaks havoc on a miniature city. The video also notably features the first appearance of the "Blohsh", Eilish's signature logo, as well as Murakami's flowers.

Kanye West released an animated music video based on his song, "Good Morning", which was part of his third studio album Graduation (2007). Though not released as a single, an animated music video was produced for "Good Morning". The video was produced by Japanese animation studio OLM and directed by Japanese contemporary artist Takashi Murakami, who had designed the album artwork of Graduation and the cover art for the album's singles. The surrealistic visuals of the video take influences from Japanese anime and utilises cel-shaded animation. The collaboration first came about when West visited Murakami's Kaikai Kiki Co. studio in Roppongi Hills during a brief trip to Tokyo, Japan in the midst of touring the year prior. Often called "the Warhol of Japan," Murakami's surrealistic visual art is notably characterized by cartoonish creatures which appear friendly and cheerful at first glance, but possess dark, twisted undertones. The three-dimensional art technique blends artistry with Japanese anime, with the technicolor album artwork that Murakami designed for Graduation being brought to life through the use of cel-shaded animation. Its narrative also contains numerous visual and thematic references to the sci-fi film Back to the Future. The video was produced by Murakami's production and artist-management company Kaikai Kiki Co., Ltd. in conjunction with Oriental Light and Magic. The latter Japanese studio was responsible for the 3D animation of the Pokémon film franchise as well as the 2001 feature-length anime film, Inuyasha the Movie: Affections Touching Across Time. Meanwhile, the storyline of the music video was written by West, who is a fan of anime himself. An edited version of the video was first displayed in an F.Y.E. commercial used for the promotion of Graduation days before the album's release date. A clip of the animated music video was later leaked onto the Internet on November 12, 2007.

"Addict" is an animated music video released on July 17, 2020, on Vivienne "VivziePop" Medrano's YouTube channel, based on and featuring the Silva Hound song of the same name. It is depicted in the Hazbin Hotel universe, itself already a notably anime-based example.

== See also ==
- Dubbing
- Original English-language manga
- La nouvelle manga
- Limited animation
- Orientalism
- Anime and manga fandom
