= Gora Automatikoa =

- Theatrical release poster
- Directed by: Esaú Dharma; David Galán Galindo; Pablo Vara
- Written by: Esaú Dharma; David Galán Galindo; Pablo Vara
- Produced by: Raquel Cuétara; Esaú Dharma; David Galán Galindo; Carlos Guerrero; David Torres Vázquez; Pablo Vara
- Starring: Esaú Dharma; David Galán Galindo; Pablo Vara
- Cinematography: Paco Cintado
- Edited by: Esaú Dharma; David Galán Galindo; Pablo Vara
- Music by: Guillermo Vílchez Corredor; David Galán Galindo
- Production companies: 39 Escalones Films; The Other Film Production
- Distributed by: 39 Escalones Films
- Release date: December 17, 2021 (Spain)
- Running time: 71 minutes
- Country: Spain
- Language: Spanish

Gora Automatikoa (Basque words for 'up' and 'automatic', with the language being used satirically for the title) is a 2021 Spanish adult animated satirical comedy film directed, written, starred and edited by David Galán Galindo, Esaú Dharma and Pablo Vara. The rest of the voice actors are made up of Elena de Lara, Andrés Trasado, Frank T., Raúl Pérez, Pepe Macías, Sara Heras, Lucía Esteban y Miguel Martín. It premiered on December 17, 2021, in Spanish theaters.

== Synopsis ==
Galindo is a failed film director who will seek to gain recognition. How will do it? Win a Goya Award. For this reason, he will meet with Pablo, who works in a funeral home, and pedantic, pretentious artist Dharma, to produce an animated film and thus achieve his dream: win an automatic Goya.

== Voice cast ==
The actors participating in this film are:

- David Galán Galindo as Galindo
- Esaú Dharma as Dharma
- Pablo Vara as Pablo
- Elena de Lara as Leader of the Spanish Union
- Andrés Trasado as Drunk Homeless Man
- Frank T. as Vatmann / Referee
- Raúl Pérez as Antonio Banderas
- Pepe Macías as Omniscient Narrator / Hexagon / Pussy Posse / Voice of the NO-DO / Goya Audience / Pablo's Father
- Sara Heras as Paula Prada / Dead girl 2 / Circle / Blind girl
- Lucía Esteban as Mrs. Death / Mrs. 1960 / Mrs. 2021
- Miguel Martín as God / Fixed Dead / Square / Andy Warhol / Horseman 2 / Doctor Superchampions / French Doctor

== Idealization ==
The idea for the film was born on March 6, 2021, when David Galán Galindo, one of the directors, witnessed the automatic victory of Turu, the Wacky Hen as Best Animated Film for being the only candidate at the 35th Goya Awards. That event motivated him, together with Esaú Dharma and Pablo Vara, to produce an animated film in less than 1 year (6 months) with the unique purpose of winning an automatic Goya.

== Accolades ==
Year	Award	Category	Recipient	Result	Ref.
2022	77th CEC Awards	Best Animated Film	Gora Automatikoa	Nominated	
2022	36th Goya Awards	Best Animated Film	Gora Automatikoa	Nominated	

== Sequel ==
After the film failed to win the Best Animated Film award at the 36th Goya Awards, a sequel titled Gora Automatikoa 2: Otra vez la misma mierda (lit. 'Gora Automatikoa 2: The same shit again') was released in 2022.
