= Dogmons! =

Brazilian television series

Dogmons! is a Brazilian children's animated series produced by the studio Intervalo Produções and created by Levi Luz. The series is actually an anime-style animation project that started in 2002, being one the first major animation projects in the country to be inspired by Japanese animation. The pilot episode, named "O Portal", was at first released on DVD on anime events by Band Filmes, until in 2008 it was released on the internet on the now defunct video site WTN.

The project was canceled after its pilot episode due to lack of funds for production and sponsorships, which led to the project being shelved until it returned in 2017 through a webcomic.

== Synopsis ==
Months after the disappearance of his father, Professor J. J. Lotsalies, the young boy Alex decides to visit his cousins Cris and Nando on Rio de Janeiro after finding his father's diary that had mysteriously ended up in his room. Based on the writings in the diary, Alex and his cousins find a portal that teleports them to the planet Canis-2B, a place where alien beings with powers similar to dogs called Dogmons live. Once there, the trio befriends a dog named Greendog who can transform into a Dragodog. Together they encounter a colony of bee dogs called Beedog led by a queen bee named Buzzydog. From there, the trio decides to join their new friends in search of finding Professor Lotsalies.

== Cast ==
- Gustavo Nader as Alex
- Flávia Fontenelle as Cris
- Gustavo Pereira as Nando
- Ana Lúcia Menezes as Beedogs
- Miriam Ficher as Buzzydog
- Carlos Seidl as Wizdog

== Development ==
The first concepts for the series were made in 1998 with the name X-Dog, but the title was not well received because people believed it sounded like the name of a sandwich and was changed to Dogmons in 2002, inspired by the success of the Pokémon and Digimon franchises. The project was financed by Embraer, a Brazilian aviation company, and as a way of thanking them, in the first few minutes of the animation, a model plane can be seen. However, with the change in Embraer's management, they stopped financing cultural projects and therefore Dogmons lost sponsorship. The initial plan was to produce a first season of 13 episodes, however, due to the low budget, production could not continue, giving up on the show.

Band Filmes released it on DVD the same year the animated series was released, and there was a plan to show the series on TV, however, this never happened. A comic book adaptation of the pilot episode was also released on the DVD release intending to release a complete manga, but the project did not go ahead after the first issue. The sale took place at the Anime Family and Anime Friends events.

In 2008, a partnership was formed between Intervalo Produções and the video website WTN to make their productions available in a type of weekly webshow containing a puppet version of Beedog as a hostess in a children's show entitled Dogmons! Show with the aim of better promoting the project. The program premiered on September 11, 2008, and the pilot had an opening sung by Christiano Torreão. The pilot was shown in 5 weeks divided into 5 parts. After the pilot's broadcast was completed, Dogmons was replaced by other productions, including the tokusatsu series by the same creator Mega Powers!, although still continuing to have the Beedog puppet as hostess. In the same year, a website was launched containing more information about the series, including other planned Dogmons. Another 2 episodes were planned that year, but none were made.

In 2018 the website was revamped after being abandoned for several years, with the project returning through a webcomic made by artists Felipe Cereda and Shewdon Barcelos, who after a tribute were hired by Levi Luz the previous year to make a webcomic rebooting the original story and redesigning the characters. However, after that year there were no more updates to the webcomic and site with only two chapters being released.

== Reception ==
The project and the pilot went unnoticed by many during its launch in the 2000s, causing the series to not achieve success. Dogmons only received recognition in the late 2010s when the series was discovered by YouTubers from outside Brazil highlighting the series as a Pokémon mockbuster. Since then, the animation has been referenced by several websites on the internet as one of the biggest rip-offs of famous animated series.
