= Karmachakra =

Indian anime-influenced animated film

- Karmachakra poster
- Directed by: Rajorshi Basu
- Written by: Rajorshi Basu
- Produced by: Rajorshi Basu
- Production company: Durga Studio
- Running time: 90 minutes
- Country: India
- Language: Bengali

Karmachakra (transl. Wheel of Fate) also known as Karmachakra: Episode Zero is an anime-influenced original mystery drama Indian animated film produced by Studio Durga. Billed as the first independent Indian anime production, the project was first announced in 2017. Production was completed in 2020. Karmachakra: Episode Zero is planned to be the first of a series of three Karmachakra films.

A 20-minute pilot was released on YouTube in February 2020.

== Premise ==
Set in urban Indian state West Bengal's capital city of Kolkata, an orphaned girl Ganga is embodied into finding her parents and her roots while coping up with her present situations. What starts out as a search for the past begins digging up more sinister fragments of mysticism, psychology and cryptography. Battling the unanswered questions, Ganga is sworn to find the truth of her ordeal and events leading to her mystery, which might also reveal several webs of connections en route.

== Cast ==
- Swastika Mukherjee as Ganga
- Sabyasachi Chakrabarty as Dr. Roy
- Tanusree Shankar as Mita Di
- Mir Afsar Ali as Arka
- Santu Mukherjee as Professor Sid
- Anik Dutta as Ghoshal
- Parno Mittra as Meghna
- Swaroopa Ghosh as Madhavi
- Alaknanda Roy as Mrs. Roy
- Shaantilal Mukherjee as Gautam
- Barun Chanda as Gomes
- Shamik Sinha as Ronnie
- Rajorshi Basu as Rick
