= Goya Award for Best Animated Film =

Annual award by the Spanish Film Academy

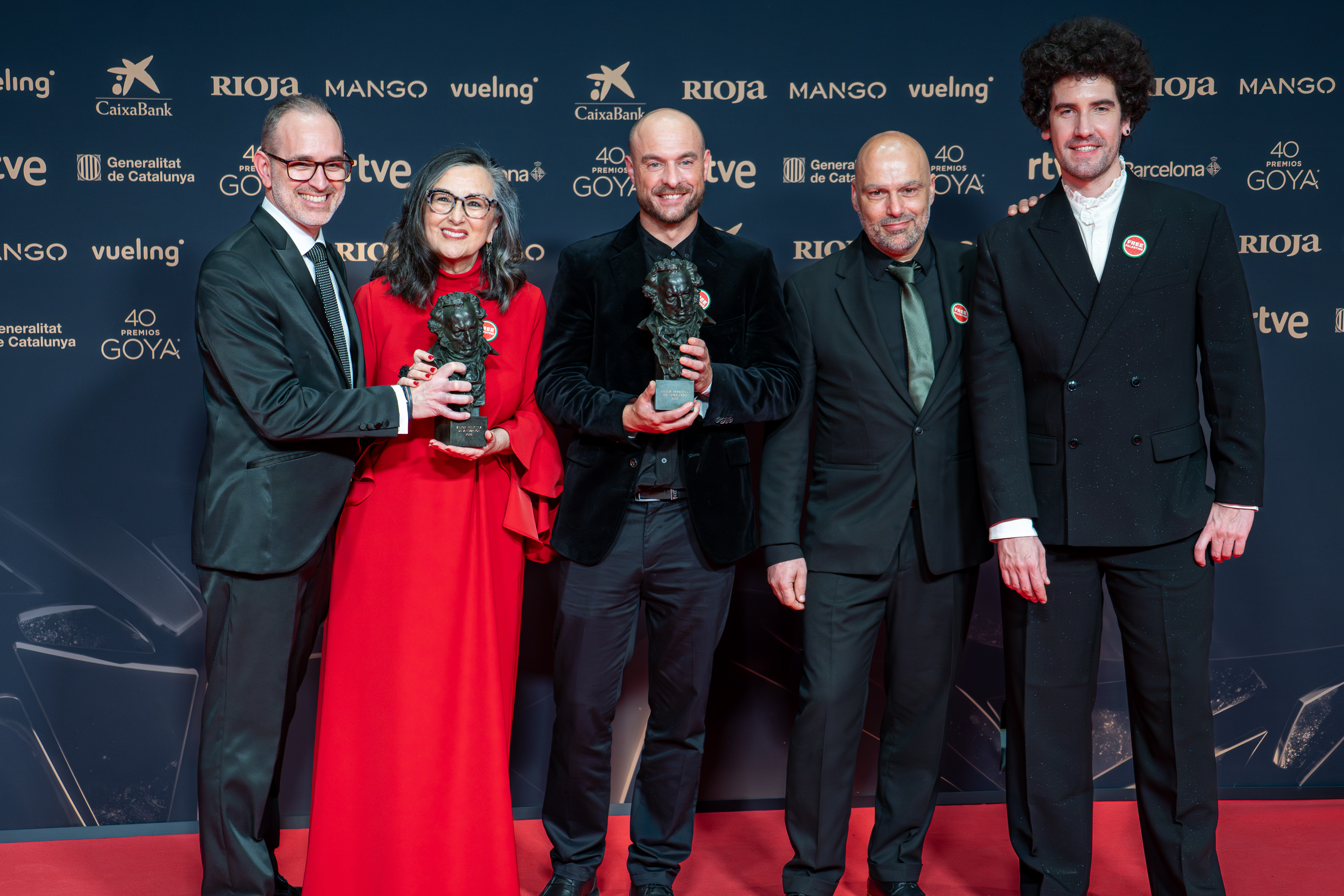
- Team of Decorado, the 2026 winner
- Native name: Premio Goya a la mejor película animada
- Awarded for: Best Spanish animated film of the year
- Country: Spain
- Presented by: Academy of Cinematographic Arts and Sciences of Spain (AACCE)
- First award: 4th Goya Awards (1989)
- Most recent winner: Decorado (2025)
- Website: Official website

The Goya Award for Best Animated Film (Spanish: Premio Goya a la mejor película animada) is one of the Goya Awards presented annually by the Academy of Cinematographic Arts and Sciences of Spain (AACCE) since the 4th edition of the awards in 1989. The category was not presented in 1990–1993 and 1995–1996. It honours the best Spanish animated film of the year.

== Winners and nominees ==
In the list below the winner of the award for each year is shown first, followed by the other nominees.

=== 1980s ===
Year	English title	Original title	Director(s)	Producer(s)
1989 (4th)	Los cuatro músicos de Bremen		Palomo Cruz Delgado	Estudios Cruz Delgado

=== 1990s ===
Year	English title	Original title	Director(s)	Producer(s)
1994 (9th)	El regreso del viento del norte		Maite Ruiz de Austri	Episa Euskal Pictures International
1995 (10th)	Not awarded			
1996 (11th)	Not awarded			
1997 (12th)	Megasónicos	Megasonikoak	Javier González de la Fuente, José Martínez Montero	Baleuko Kumunikazioa
1998 (13th)	¡Qué vecinos tan animales!		Maite Ruiz de Austri	Extra Producciones Audiovisuales
1998 (13th)	Ahmed, el príncipe de La Alhambra		Juan Bautista Berasategi	Lotura Films
1999 (14th)	Goomer		José Luis Feito and Carlos Varela	SOGEDASA

=== 2000s ===
Year	English title	Original title	Director(s)	Producer(s)
2000 (15th)	La isla del cangrejo	Karramarro Uhartea	Ángel Muñoz, Txabi Basterretxea	Irusoin
2000 (15th)	10+2: el gran secreto		Miquel Pujol Lozano	Accio, Infinit Animacions
2000 (15th)	El ladrón de sueños		Ángel Alonso García	Dibulitoon Studio
2000 (15th)	Marco Antonio. Rescate en Hong Kong		Carlos Varela Adalid, Manuel J. García	Merlín Animación, Inventaria, Estambul Blues, Asigraf, José Picazo, Arturo Chico, Voice Art
2001 (16th)	El bosque animado, sentirás su magia		Manolo Gómez and Ángel de la Cruz	Dygra Films, Megatrix
2001 (16th)	La leyenda del unicornio		Maite Ruiz de Austri	Extra Extremadura de Audiovisuales
2001 (16th)	Manuelita		Manuel García Ferré	Megatrix, Producciones García Ferré
2001 (16th)	Un perro llamado dolor		Luis Eduardo Aute	Story Board
2002 (17th)	Dragon Hill, la colina del dragón		Ángel Izquierdo	Milimetros
2002 (17th)	Anjé, la leyenda del Pirineo		Juan José Elordi Bilbao	Baleuko
2002 (17th)	El rey de la granja		Gregorio Muro	Bainet Zinema
2002 (17th)	Puerta del tiempo		Pedro Eeugenio Delgado	Magic Films
2003 (18th)	El Cid: The Legend	El Cid: La leyenda	José Pozo	Castelar Productions, Toon Factory
2003 (18th)	El embrujo del sur		Juanba Berasategui	Castelao Productions, Canal Sur Televisión, ETB, Lotura Films, Producciones Zig Zag
2003 (18th)	Glup		Aitor Arregi, Iñigo Berasategi	Irusoin, Dibulitoon Studio, Planeta Junior
2003 (18th)	Los Reyes Magos		Antonio Navarro	Animagic Studio, Carrere Group
2004 (19th)	Pinocchio 3000	P3K, Pinocchio the Robot	Daniel Robichaud	Castelao Productions, Cine – Groupe Pinocho 3001 INC., Animakids Productions
2004 (19th)	Los Balunis en la aventura del fin del mundo		Juanjo Elordi	Baleuko
2004 (19th)	Supertramps		José Mari Goenaga, Íñigo Berasategui	Irusoin, Dibulitoon Studio
2005 (20th)	Midsummer Dream	El sueño de una noche de San Juan	Ángel de la Cruz and Manolo Gómez	Dygra Films, Appia Filmes
2005 (20th)	Gisaku		Baltasar Pedrosa	Filmax Animation, Sociedad Estatal para Exposiciones Internacionales
2006 (21st)	The Hairy Tooth Fairy	Pérez, el ratoncito de tus sueños	Juan Pablo Buscarini	Filmax Animation, Castelao Productions, Patagonik Film Group
2006 (21st)	De profundis		Miguelanxo Prado	Continental Producciones, Desembarco Producciones, Televisión de Galicia, Zeppelín Filmes
2006 (21st)	El cubo mágico		Ángel Izquierdo	Milímetros Dibujos Animados
2006 (21st)	Teo, cazador intergaláctico		Sergio Bayo	Alma Alta International Pictures, Shazam
2007 (22nd)	Nocturna	Nocturna, una aventura mágica	Víctor Maldonado and Adrià García	Filmax Animation, Animakids, Castelao Productions, Bren Entertainment
2007 (22nd)	Azur & Asmar: The Princes' Quest	Azur et Asmar	Michel Ocelot	S2 International Audiovisual, Intuituin Films, Nord – Ouest
2007 (22nd)	Betizu eta urrezko zintzarria		Egoitz Rodríguez	Baleuko
2007 (22nd)	Boo, Zino & the Snurks	En busca de la piedra mágica	Lenard F. Krawinkel and Holger Tappe	Morena Films, Recorded Pictured Company, Ambient Entertainment
2008 (23rd)	Missing Lynx	El lince perdido	Manuel Sicilia and Raúl García	Kandor Graphics, Green Moon, Perro Verde Films
2008 (23rd)	Donkey Xote		José Pozo	Filmax Animation, Lumiq, Green Publicidad y Medios
2008 (23rd)	Spirit of the Forest	Espíritu del bosque	David Rubín and Juan Carlos Pena	Dygra Film
2008 (23rd)	RH+, el vampiro de Sevilla		Antonio Zurera	Milímetros Dibujos Animados
2009 (24th)	Planet 51	Planet 51	Jorge Blanco, Javier Abad and Marcos Martínez	Ignacio Pérez Dolset, Juan Carlos Caro
2009 (24th)	Animal Channel		Maite Ruiz de Austri	Iñigo Silva
2009 (24th)	Pérez, el ratoncito de tus sueños 2		Andrés Schaer	Carlos Fernández, Julio Fernández
2009 (24th)	The Aviators	Cher Ami	Miquel Pujol	Màxim Mata

=== 2010s ===
Year	English title	Original title	Director(s)	Producer(s)
2010 (25th)	Chico and Rita	Chico y Rita	Fernando Trueba, Javier Mariscal	Cristina Huete, Santiago Errando, Michael Rose
2010 (25th)	El tesoro del rey Midas		Maite Ruiz de Austri	Iñigo Silva
2010 (25th)	The Happets	La tropa de trapo en el país donde siempre brilla el sol	Àlex Colls	Àlex Colls, Pancho Casal, Chelo Loureiro, Santiago Beascoa
2010 (25th)	Las aventuras de don Quijote		Antonio Zurera	Ángel Izquierdo, Antonio Zurera, Carmen Pérez
2011 (26th)	Wrinkles	Arrugas	Ignacio Ferreras	Manuel Cristóbal, Enrique Aguirrezabala, Oriol Ivern
2011 (26th)	Carthago Nova		Primitivo Pérez, José María Molina	Pedro Flores García
2011 (26th)	Daddy, I'm a Zombie	Papá, soy una Zombi	Ricardo Ramón, Joan Espinach	Joxe Portela, Beñat Beitia
2012 (27th)	Tad, The Lost Explorer	Las aventuras de Tadeo Jones	Enrique Gato	Ghislain Barrois, Edmon Roch, Nicolás Matji, Jordi Gasull
2012 (27th)	El corazón del roble		Ricardo Ramón, Ángel Izquierdo	Ricardo Ramón, Lucía Gómez
2012 (27th)	The Apostle	O Apóstolo	Fernando Cortizo	Isabel Rey
2012 (27th)	The Wish Fish		Gorka Vázquez, Iván Oneka	Karmelo Vivanco, Eduardo Barinaga
2013 (28th)	Underdogs	Futbolín (Spain) / Metegol (Latin America)	Juan José Campanella	Jorge Estrada, Manuel Polanco, Mikel Lejarza
2013 (28th)	Lucius Dumben berebiziko bidaia	El extraordinario viaje de Lucius Dumb	Maite Ruiz de Austri	Íñigo Silva
2013 (28th)	Hiroku y los defensores de Gaia		Saúl Barreto Gómez and Manuel González Mauricio	Agustín Padrón Castañeda, Manuel González Mauricio
2013 (28th)	Justin and the Knights of Valour	Justin y la espada del valor	Manuel Sicilia	Antonio Banderas, Kerry Fulton, Marcelino Almansa Ortiz
2014 (29th)	Mortadelo and Filemon: Mission Implausible	Mortadelo y Filemón contra Jimmy el Cachondo	Javier Fesser	Francisco Ramos, Luis Manso
2014 (29th)	Mummy, I'm a Zombie	Dixie y la rebelión zombi	Ricardo Ramón and Beñat Beitia	Joxe Portela
2014 (29th)	La tropa de trapo en la selva del arcoiris		Álex Colls	Chelo Loureiro, Assunçao Hernandes Moraes de Andrade, Álex Colls, Pancho Casal Vidal, Santi Beascoa Amat
2015 (30th)	Capture the Flag	Atrapa la bandera	Enrique Gato	Álvaro Augustin, Ghislain Barrois, Javier Ugarte, Jorge Tuca, Nicolás Matji, Edmon Roch, Axel Kuschevatzky, Gabriel Arias-Salgado, Ignacio Fernández-Vega, Jordi Gasull, Edmon Roch
2015 (30th)	Meñique y el espejo mágico		Ernesto Padrón	Esther Hirzel Galarza, Armando Alba, Julio Casal Fernández-Couto, Mamen Quintas
2015 (30th)	Noche ¿de paz? - Holly night!		Juan Galiñanes	Manolo Gómez, Lucas Mackey, Belén París
2015 (30th)	Yoko and His Friends	Yoko eta lagunak	Iñigo Berasategui, Juanjo Elordi, Rishat Gilmetdinov	Alexander Mirgorodskiy, Vladimir Nikolaev, Yuri Moskvin, Juan José Elordi, Ricardo Ramón
2016 (31st)	Birdboy: The Forgotten Children	Psiconautas, los niños olvidados	Pedro Rivero, Alberto Vázquez	Zircozine, Basque Films, Abrakam Estudio, La Competencia Producciones
2016 (31st)	Ozzy		Alberto Rodríguez, Nacho La Casa	Capitán Araña, Arcadia Motion Pictures, Pachacamac, BD Animation
2016 (31st)	Teresa eta Galtzagorri	Teresa eta Galtzagorri	Agurtzane Intxaurraga	Dibulitoon Studio
2017 (32nd)	Tad the Lost Explorer and the Secret of King Midas	Tadeo Jones 2: El secreto del Rey Midas	David Alonso, Enrique Gato	Tadeo Jones y el Secreto de Midas, Telecinco Cinema, Telefónica Studios, 4 Cats Pictures, Ikiru Films, Lightbox Animation Studios
2017 (32nd)	Deep		Julio Soto Gurpide	The Kraken Films, The Thinklab
2017 (32nd)	Nur eta Herensugearen tenplua		Juan Bautista Berasategi	Lotura Films, Euskaltel
2018 (33rd)	Another Day of Life	Un día más con vida	Raúl de la Fuente, Damian Nenow	Kanaki Films, Platige Films
2018 (33rd)	Azahar		Rafael Ruiz Ávila	Granada Film Factory
2018 (33rd)	Bikes The Movie		Manuel J. García	Animation Bikes
2018 (33rd)	Memoirs of a Man in Pajamas	Memorias de un hombre en pijama	Carlos Fernández de Vigo	Dream Team Concept, Ézaro Films, Hampa Studio
2019 (34th)	Buñuel in the Labyrinth of the Turtles	Buñuel en el laberinto de las tortugas	Salvador Simó	Sygnatia, The Glow Animation Studio, Hampa Studio
2019 (34th)	Elcano & Magellan: The First Voyage Around the World	Elcano y Magallanes: la primera vuelta al mundo	Ángel Alonso	Elkano Dibulitoon, Dibulitoon Studio
2019 (34th)	Klaus		Sergio Pablos	Atresmedia Cine, Sergio Pablos Animation Studios

=== 2020s ===
Year	English title	Original title	Director(s)	Producer(s)
2020 (35th)	Turu, the Wacky Hen	La gallina Turuleca	Eduardo Gondell and Víctor Monigote	Brown Films, Gloriamundi Producciones, Producions A Fonsagrada, Tandem Films
2021 (36th)	Valentina		Chelo Loureiro	Brandán de Brano, Chelo Loureiro, Luís da Matta, Mariano Baratech, Noa García
2021 (36th)	Gora Automatikoa		David Galán Galindo, Esaú Dharma, Pablo Vara	Carlos Guerrero, David Galán Galindo, David Torres Vázquez, Esaú Dharma, Pablo Vara
2021 (36th)	Mironins		Mikel Mas Bilbao, Txesco Montalt	Álex Cervantes, Ángel Coronado, Anton Roebben, Eric Goossens, Iván Agenjo, Mikel Mas Bilbao, Oriol Roca
2021 (36th)	Salvar el árbol (Zutik!)		Haizea Pastor, Iker Álvarez	Carmelo Vivanco, Egoitz Rodríguez, Fernando Alonso, Jonatan Guzmán, Nelson Botter
2022 (37th)	Unicorn Wars		Alberto Vázquez	Chelo Loureiro, Iván Miñambres, Nicolás Schmerkin
2022 (37th)	Black Is Beltza II: Ainhoa		Fermin Muguruza	Hugo Castro, Jone Unanua
2022 (37th)	Inspector Sun and the Curse of the Black Widow	Inspector Sun y la maldición de la viuda negra	Julio Soto Gurpide	Adriana Malfatti Chen, Jason Kaminsky, Julio Soto Gúrpide, Karl Richards, Peter Rogers, Rocco Pucillo
2022 (37th)	My Grandfather's Demons	Os demos de barro	Nuno Beato	Carlos Juárez, Diogo Carvalho, Emmanuel Quillet, Martine Vidalenc, Nuno Beato, Xosé Zapata
2022 (37th)	Tad, the Lost Explorer and the Emerald Tablet	Tadeo Jones 3. La tabla esmeralda	Enrique Gato	Álvaro Augustin, Edmon Roch, Ghislain Barrois, Javier Ugarte, Marc Sabé, Nicolás Matji
2023 (38th)	Robot Dreams		Pablo Berger	Ángel Durández, Ibon Cormenzana, Ignasi Estapé, Pablo Berger, Sandra Tapia
2023 (38th)	They Shot the Piano Player	Le dispararon al pianista	Fernando Trueba, Javier Mariscal	Cristina Huete, Fernando Trueba, Javier Mariscal
2023 (38th)	Sultana's Dream	El sueño de la sultana	Isabel Herguera	Chelo Loureiro, Diego Herguera, Fabian Driehorst, Isabel Herguera, Iván Miñambres, Mariano Baratech
2023 (38th)	Hannah and the Monsters	Hanna i els monstres	Lorena Ares	Ángeles Hernández, David Matamoros, Lorena Ares
2023 (38th)	Mummies	Momias	Juan Jesús García Galocha "Galo"	Cleber Beretta, Francisco Celma, Jordi Gasull, Juan Jesús García Galocha "Galo", Marc Sabé, Pedro Solís, Toni Novella
2024 (39th)	Black Butterflies	Papallones negres	David Baute	César Zelada, David Baute, Edmon Roch, Marc Sabé
2024 (39th)	Buffalo Kids		Pedro Solís, Juan Jesús García "Galo"	Cleber Beretta, Francisco Celma, Ignacio Salazar-Simpson, Jaime Ortiz de Artiñano, Jordi Gasull, Marc Sabé, Pedro Solís, Ricardo Marco Budé, Toni Novella
2024 (39th)	Dragonkeeper	Dragonkeeper: Guardiana de dragones	Salvador Simó and Li Jianping	Aurora de Cos, Fu Ruoqing, Larry Levene, Pedro Pérez, Peng Mingyu, Song Weiwei, Tro Juanyu, Yang Lihe
2024 (39th)	Rock Bottom		María Trénor	Adán Aliaga, Alba Sotorra, Anna Mroczek, Dani Bagur, Kiko Domínguez, Lukasz Kacprowicz, Marcin Wasilewski, Miguel Molina Carmona, Robert Jaszczurowski, Wojciech Leszczynski
2024 (39th)	Superklaus		Steven Majaury	Dario Sanchez, François Trudel, Nacho La Casa
2025 (40th)	Decorado		Alberto Vázquez	Chelo Loureiro, Iván Miñambres, Jose María Fernández de Vega
2025 (40th)	Awakening Beauty	Bella	Manuel H. Martín, Amparo Martínez Barco	Bernabé Rico, Carlos Rosado Sibón, Manuel H. Martín, Olmo Figueredo González-Quevedo
2025 (40th)	The Treasure of Barracuda	El tesoro de Barracuda	Adrián García	Álex Cervantes, Raphaële Ingberg, Valérie Delpierre
2025 (40th)	Norbert		José Corral Llorente	Álvaro Urtizberea, Nacho La Casa, Pedro Hernández Santos
2025 (40th)	Olivia and the Invisible Earthquake	L'Olívia i el terratrèmol invisible	Irene Iborra Rizo	Eduard Puertas Anfruns, Irene Iborra Rizo, Mikel Mas Bilbao, Ramón Alòs Sánchez

== Multiple winners ==
- Enrique Gato - 3
- Alberto Vázquez - 3

== See also ==
- César Award for Best Animated Film
- Academy Award for Best Animated Feature
- BAFTA Award for Best Animated Film
- European Film Award for Best Animated Film
- Platino Award for Best Animated Film
