= Los Trotamúsicos =

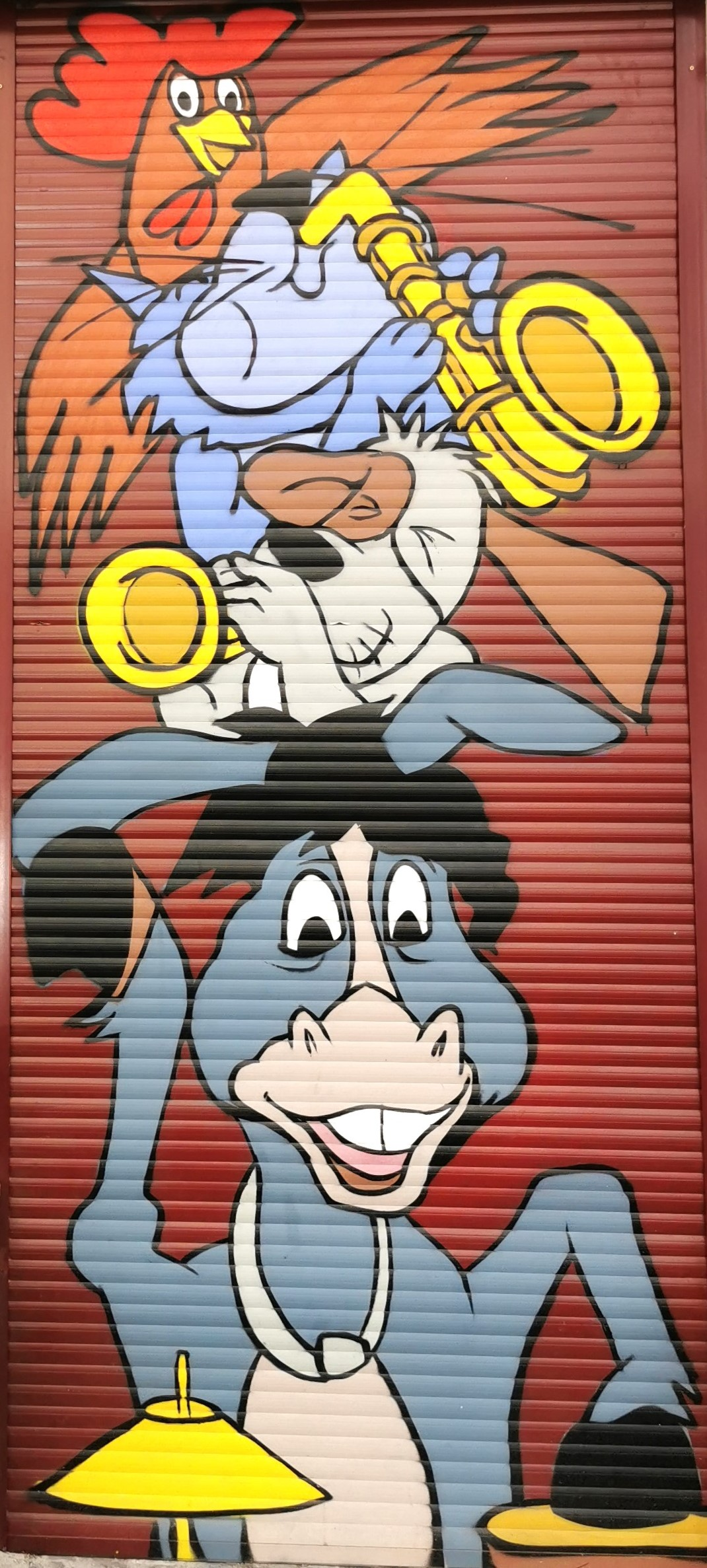
- Mural depicting the four main characters
- Created by: Cruz Delgado
- Based on: Town Musicians of Bremen by Brothers Grimm
- Starring: Rafael Alonso Narranjo Jr; Gonzalo Durán; Eduardo Jover; Claudio Serrano; Simón Ramírez; Luis Marín
- Country of origin: Spain
- Original language: Spanish
- No. of seasons: 1
- No. of episodes: 26

Production
- Running time: 26 min
- Production company: Estudios Cruz Delgado for Televisión Española

Original release
- Network: TVE1
- Release: October 1, 1989 – March 25, 1990

Los Trotamúsicos is a Spanish animated television series, based on the Town Musicians of Bremen by the Brothers Grimm, produced by Estudios Cruz Delgado for Televisión Española and first broadcast on October 1, 1989. It ended on March 25, 1990.

The series follows the story of four animal friends, a rooster, a donkey, a dog and a cat, who form a band playing respectively guitar, drums, trumpet and saxophone.

Originally released theatrically as a 86 minutes feature film titled Town Musicians of Bremen, it was heavily expanded into a television series due its success. The film was also released in English as Once Upon a Tune. It was also known in Germany as Die Abenteuer der Bremer Stadtmusikanten. The film won the Goya Award for Best Animated Film.

== Episodes ==
1. La fuga de Koky - Koky the Rooster runs from the Farm to escape death, and encounters a mistreated Donkey named Tonto, and later, a canine named Lupo, who is taken for granted by a man who fakes being blind. (October 1, 1989)
2. Atraco en el bosque - Koky and the others take refuge in a house, where they meet a cat named Burlon. Meanwhile, Three Thieves steal a golden trumpet from the Burgermeister. (October 8, 1989)
3. Casa de fantasmas - The Four Musicians first encounter the Thieves, and must escape capture when they accidentally acquire the golden trumpet. (October 15, 1989)
4. ¡Todos a Bremen! - The Four Musicians arrive at Bremen while still trying to avoid the Thieves, and return the Golden Trumpet to the Burgemeister. (October 22, 1989)
5. Los amigos del bosque (October 29, 1989)
6. El quinto músico (November 5, 1989)
7. El tesoro de la gruta (November 12, 1989)
8. El rapto de Tonto (November 19, 1989)
9. Tropiezos y trapecios (November 26, 1989)
10. Las genialidades del genio ingenioso (December 3, 1989)
11. La aventura del montgolfo (December 10, 1989)
12. ¡Menudo equipo! (December 17, 1989)
13. Ladrones Navideños (December 24, 1989)
14. El gigante bondadoso (December 31, 1989)
15. El gas bailarin (January 7, 1990)
16. La merienda del lobo (January 14, 1990)
17. Una aventura cañon (January 21, 1990)
18. El laberinto perdido (January 28, 1990)
19. El Pequeño elefante blanco (February 4, 1990)
20. El regreso de Rat Rater (February 11, 1990)
21. Contra golpe, golpetazo (February 18, 1990)
22. Aventura en la granja (February 25, 1990)
23. El extraño caso raro (March 4, 1990)
24. El primo guasón (March 11, 1990)
25. Búsqueda en el bosque (March 18, 1990)
26. Un grupo inseparable (March 25, 1990)
