= Maite Ruiz de Austri =

Spanish director and writer (born 1959)

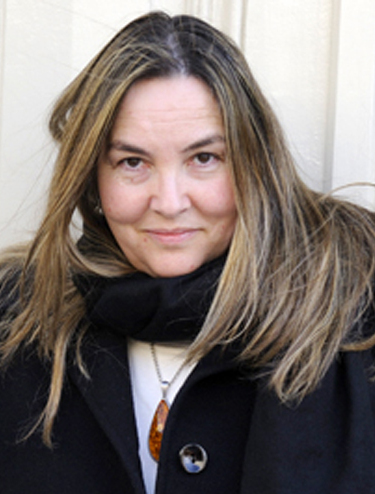
- At the 2011 Guadalajara International Film Festival
- Born: 1959 (age 66–67); Madrid, Spain
- Occupations: Director, writer
- Awards: Goya Award for Best Animated Film (1994, 1998)

Maite Ruiz de Austri (born 1959) is a Spanish writer, screenwriter, and film and television director, specializing in programs for children and young adults.

== Career ==
For more than 25 years, until 2018, Maite Ruiz de Austri was the only woman in Spain to direct animated feature films. She has produced a long list of award-winning films, television programs, and series. In addition, she is a screenwriter and director of television series, documentaries of both animation and fiction.

She was one of the founding members of the Association of Women Filmmakers (CIMA) that was created to "give a boost to the role of women in film, especially in jobs of responsibility. She is a member of the Academy of Sciences and Cinematographic Arts of Spain.

== Awards and recognitions ==
- 1995 Goya Award for Best Animated Film for The Return of the North Wind
- 1999 Goya Award for Best Animated Film for Qué vecinos tan animales!
- Nominated for 2002 Goya Award for Best Animated Film for The Legend of the Unicorn
- Gold Medal and Platinum Remi Award at the 2009 Houston International Film Festival for Animal Channel
- Nominated for 2010 Goya Award for Best Animated Film for Animal Channel
- Nominated for 2011 Goya Award for Best Animated Film for El tesoro del rey Midas
- Nominated for 2014 Goya Award for Best Animated Film for El Extraordinario Viaje de Lucius Dumb

== Filmography ==
- 1992 - The Legend of the North Wind
- 1993 - The Return of the North Wind
- 1998 - Que vecinos tan animales!
- 2001 - The Legend of the Unicorn
- 2008 - Animal Channel
- 2010 - El tesoro del rey Midas
- 2013 - El extraordinario viaje de Lucius Dumb: Los derechos humanos tu mejor instrumento
- 2018 - La bola dorada
