= Turu, the Wacky Hen =

- Film poster
- Directed by: Eduardo Gondell; Víctor Monigote
- Screenplay by: Eduardo Gondell; Juan Pablo Buscarini; Pablo Bossi
- Based on: La Gallina Turuleca by Los Payasos de la Tele
- Produced by: Carlos Fernández; Cristina Zumárraga; Pablo Bossi; Laura Fernández Brites
- Cinematography: Alejandro Valente
- Music by: Sergio Moure
- Production companies: Argentina Sono Film S.A.C.I.; Brown Films AIE; Gloriamundi Producciones; In Post We Trust; Instituto Nacional de Cine y Artes Audiovisuales (INCAA); Mediabyte; Pampa Films; Produccions A Fonsagrada; Tandem Films
- Distributed by: Filmax (Spain); Buena Vista International (Argentina)
- Release dates: 21 September 2019 (SSIFF); 1 January 2020 (Spain)
- Running time: 80 minutes
- Countries: Spain; Argentina
- Language: Spanish
- Box office: $1.3 million

Turu, the Wacky Hen (Spanish: La gallina Turuleca) is a 2019 Spanish-language animated musical comedy film directed by Eduardo Gondell and Víctor Monigote. The title comes from the popular children's song La gallina Turuleca, itself a Spanish version of the song A galinha magricela by Brazilian songwriter Edgard Poças, and popularized by Los Payasos de la Tele.

The film had its world premiere at the San Sebastián International Film Festival on 21 September 2019, and was theatrically released in Spain on 1 January 2020 by Filmax and in Argentina on 14 July 2022 by Buena Vista International. It received mixed reviews, but won Best Animated Film at the 35th Goya Awards and 8th Platino Awards.

== Premise ==
Unable to hatch any eggs, a hen named Turuleca finds her life changed when she is sold to an old lady, who discovers the hen can sing.

== Voice cast ==
- Eva Hache as Turuleca
- José Mota as Armando Tramas
- Ana Ángeles as Isabel
- Álvaro de Juana Pecos as Matías
- Paula Coria Portilla as Lucía
- Alejandro García as Antonio
- Lorenzo Beteta as Rudy
- Eva Lorenzo as Nurse

== Release ==
Turu, the Wacky Hen had its world premiere at the San Sebastián International Film Festival in Spain on 21 September 2019, and premiered in Argentina at the Mar del Plata International Film Festival on 10 November 2019. It was theatrically released in Spain on 1 January 2020 by Filmax and it was theatrically released in Argentina on 14 July 2022 by Walt Disney Studios Motion Pictures under the Star Distribution label. The film had a worldwide gross of $1,360,825.

=== Critical reception ===
The film received mixed reviews from critics, but won Best Animated Film at the 35th Goya Awards– as the only nominated film – and 8th Platino Awards.
