= Os Under-Undergrounds =

- Genre: Animated series
- Created by: Hugo Oda
- Developed by: Tortuga Studios
- Written by: Fernando Alonso; Hugo Oda; Nelson Botter Jr.
- Directed by: Nelson Botter Jr.
- Voices of: Arthur Berges; Bruna Guerin; Yuri Chessman; Fábio Lucindo; Robson Kumode
- Opening theme: Debaixo da Terra
- Composers: Ruben Feffer; Fábio Stamato
- Country of origin: Brazil
- Original language: Portuguese
- No. of seasons: 2
- No. of episodes: 52

Production
- Executive producers: Fernando Alonso; Nelson Botter Jr.
- Running time: 13-14 minutes
- Production company: Tortuga Studios

Original release
- Network: Nickelodeon
- Release: May 9, 2016 – August 2, 2021

Os Under-Undergrounds (English: The Under-Undergrounds) is a Brazilian animated television series created by Hugo Oda and produced by Tortuga Studios. The first season premiered in Brazil on Nickelodeon on May 9, 2016.

The series focuses on problems that children and teenagers have with relationships and social acceptance. Ruben Feffer created many of the original songs for the series.

== Plot ==
The story begins when Heitor Villa-Lobos, a teen guitarist, is kicked out of his band as a result of his former bandmates' greed. On returning home, he accidentally falls into a hole that leads him to an underground world inhabited by mutants. Once there he meets Layla and her friends, Lud and Bob, who make up a rock band called "Under-Undergrounds". Heitor befriends the trio and joins the band, while at the same time seeking help to find his way back to the surface and his home.

== Episodes ==
Season	Episodes	Originally released	
Season	Episodes	First released	Last released
1	26	May 9, 2016	August 1, 2016

The first season of the series was aired on Nickelodeon Brazil and uploaded to YouTube in mid-2016. A second season was released in 2021.

== Characters ==
=== Main characters ===
- Heitor Villa-Lobos (voiced by Arthur Berges) – The protagonist of the series. Heitor is the guitarist, vocalist, main songwriter and the leader of the Under-Undergrounds, and also the only human member of the band. Heitor was the guitarist in an Earth band called "Blitz Creek Bop", but after being replaced and expelled from it, he accidentally fell into an open manhole, landing in the Underground World. He later joined the band Under-Undergrounds.
- Layla Bach (voiced by Bruna Guerin) – The co-leader of the Under-Undergrounds, owner of the garage where they rehearse and one of the founders of the band. She is the keyboardist, vocalist, and only girl in the band. Layla is a pink-skinned mutant who has a pair of antennae on top of her head. Layla is also secretly in love with Heitor, revealing this secret only to her pet.
- Robert "Bob" Starkey (voiced by Yuri Chessman) – The drummer of the Under-Undergrounds and one of the founders of the band. Bob is an obese cyclops mutant with yellowish skin.
- Ludwig "Lud" Waters (voiced by Fábio Lucindo) – The bass player for the Under-Undergrounds and a founding member. He is a blue-skinned mutant, with a large purple nose like a koala's, and has hair covering much of his face, including his eyes.
- James Marshall (voiced by Robson Kumode) – The second guitarist in the Under-Undergrounds, after Heitor, and the son of Ozzy. James is the last to join the band, becoming a member of the Unders soon after the break-up of his previous band, "Attack 51". He is a red-skinned mutant (originally green) with a tail and a series of thorns on his head, forming a kind of mohawk.

=== Recurring characters ===
- Britney Duhamel (voiced by Mariana Elizabetisky) – The biggest rival of Layla, a pretty, charming and attractive girl who is the leader and guitarist of one of the most popular bands at the school, consisting of her and her two best friends, Lily and Daisy. Britney is a mutant who has blonde hair, light blue skin, and fins in place of ears.
