= Memories of Idhún =

Fantasy book series by Laura Gallego García

Memories of Idhún (Spanish: Memorias de Idhún) is a fantasy and adventure trilogy written by the Spanish author Laura Gallego, writer of other books like Finis Mundi or Crónicas de la Torre. The series tells the story of three teenagers: Jack, Victoria and Kirtash (or Christian, according to Victoria), who are destined to change the father of the world Idhún of being destroyed forever.

The trilogy consists of:

- Memorias de Idhún I: La Resistencia (2004)
- Memorias de Idhún II: Tríada (2005)
- Memorias de Idhún III: Panteón (2006)

SM has the copyright of the books in Spanish. The trilogy has been translated into many languages, such as Catalan, Portuguese, German and Korean.

By 2008, some 350,000 copies had already been sold in Spain.

== Plot ==
The books tell the story of a fantastic chain of events that will affect two worlds: Earth and Idhún. Idhún was created by six gods, who also created the warm-blooded races (Humans, Celestes, Feéricos, Varu, Giants and Yan) and the semi-divine dragons and unicorns. There is also a seventh god, enemy of the rest, which created the cold-blooded Szish and the semi-divine sheks, which are winged snakes.

The sheks and Szish were defeated in a war and exiled to an old, dead world: Umadhún. However, a powerful necromancer, Ashran, allied with divine magic, caused a conjunction of the three suns and moons of Idhún, and used its energy to kill all dragons and unicorns so the sheks could come back and, helped by the Szish, rule the world and the warm-blooded races. Still, a prophecy by the gods stated that a unicorn and a dragon would survive and defeat the sheks.

After Ashran's rise, some warm-blooded wizards escaped to Earth. In order to kill them, Ashran sent Kirtash, a human (warm-blooded) but cold and efficient assassin. Jack and Victoria, both born on Earth, join the Resistance (which consists only of Shail, a young wizard, and Alsan of Vanissar, a warrior and prince) and try to stop him.

As the story goes on, we discover that there is a complex plot behind it, which spins around the battle of the Gods: The six creator gods (Aldun, Irial, Karevan, Wina, Yohavir and Neliam) against the Seventh god, father of the cold-blooded races. The terrestrial beings are only the pawns they'll use to win a godly battle. The dragons guide the warm-blooded races; the sheks guide the Szish. Meanwhile, the unicorns randomly spread magic through the world, touching people with their horns in order to make them semi-wizards or wizards.

The Six gods made a prophecy in order to make a dragon and a unicorn survive the massacre, and the Seventh god sent Kirtash to kill them before it came true. The Resistance will find new and powerful enemies as the story goes on, such as the beautiful fairy Gerde, who will have an important role in the last book.

- In the first book the characters develop sentimental ties and fight in Earth while they discover their own true nature and learn more about Idhún and the prophecy. Their objective is to find the last unicorn and the last dragon.
- In the second book, the characters must learn to live together and, now in Idhún, their emotional development is still going on. They find out about the prophecy and its second, secret part, which says that they will need help from a shek. The relationship between the characters becomes stronger as they become more mature.
- The third book explains the relationship of the gods with the history of Idhún and the Earth. In this book, the bonds between the main characters become unbreakable. Their enemy will be Gerde, and, even though the Resistance hates her, she will need their help.

== Worlds ==
The plot develops in four worlds: the Earth, Idhún, Limbhad (a world between the Earth and Idhun), and Umadhún.

=== The Earth ===
Important parts of the story take place on the Earth. During their adventure, the main characters visit many different countries, such as Denmark, Spain, Germany, United States or Japan. In Germany, Alsan is kidnapped and forced to become a werewolf. The Earth is barely mentioned in the second book.

=== Limbhad ===
Limbhad is a hidden world between Idhun and the Earth. You can only arrive in this world if you meet the Alma (soul), a kind of sentient machine created by the antique exiled wizards from Idhún in order to let only wizards, semi-wizards and their allies in. The Alma is an intelligent being which can spot and block out wizards with bad intentions. This world is very small and always dark. It consists of a little round house, a little forest (Victoria's favourite place), some mountains and a river.

=== Idhún ===
Idhún has essential characteristics of the Middle Ages, such as animal transport and feudal kingdoms. It is governed by Ashran the Necromancer and by Zeshak, king of the sheks. The population is divided in races, and each of them lives in different areas of Idhún. The Varu live in the sea or, as they say, the Oceanic Kingdom, in the southeast; the Giants live in Nanhai, a ring of mountains situated in the north; the Yan live in the Kash-Tar desert, in the south; The Celestes live in Celestia, which lies in the center; the Faeries live in the Awa Forest, in the northeast and the humans live in Nandelt, which is located between Nanhai and Celestia, separated in different humans kingdoms (Nanetten, Shia, Vanissar, Dingra and Raheld).

The unicorns used to live in Drackwen where there Lunn Mountain and the Alis Lithban Forest are located. The dragons used to live in Awinor and the cold-blooded races live in the swamps of Raden. There are many semi-races in Idhun, such as the Shur-ikaili Barbarians, the Limyati, the Ganti and the Semi-varu Pirates (part Human, part Varu).

=== Umadhún ===
Umadhún was the first world created by the Six gods: Irial (goddess of light and mother of the humans), Wina (goddess of life and mother of the Feéricos), Neliam (goddess of water and mother of the Varu), Aldun (god of fire and father of the Yan), Yohavir (god of the wind and father of the Celestes) and Karevan (god of the rocks and land and father of the Giants). It is full of caves because of the high temperatures. It was destroyed by the Six gods in the past, before the Seventh god was created. The sheks and Szish were exiled there after the Talmannon war. The oldest sheks, who don't want to come back to Idhún, still live there, along with primitive, semi-intelligent species.

== Dividing the books ==
At first, there were six books: Búsqueda (search), Revelación (revelation), Despertar (awakening), Predestinación (predestination), Convulsión (convulsion) and Génesis (genesis). However, the author and the publisher agreed to merge every two titles into one book, and give the three of them a similar length (28 chapters, a preface and an epilogue). Those are the three books we know today. SM has now relaunched the series, divided into the six initial books. The series has also been adapted into comic books.

== Comic books ==
The first book has already been adapted into comic books, divided into four parts. The last one was published in late 2010.

In its cover appears Ashran, Aile and Gerde.

== Animated series adaptation ==
An animesque animated series adaptation by Zeppelin TV was announced in February 2019. It was released globally on September 10, 2020 on Netflix.
