= Laura Gallego García =

Spanish author of children's literature

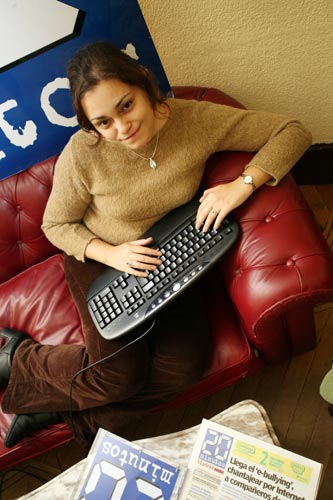
- Born: 11 October 1977 (age 48); Quart de Poblet, Spain
- Education: Hispanic Philology
- Occupation: Novelist
- Writing career
- Language: Spanish
- Notable awards: National Prize of children and juvenile literature
- Website: lauragallego.com

Laura Gallego García (born in Quart de Poblet, Valencia (Spain) on 11 October 1977) is a Spanish author of young adult literature.

== Biography ==
Laura Gallego García was born in Quart de Poblet, Valencia, on 11 October 1977. She is a Spanish novelist of children and juvenile literature, specializing in the fantasy genre. She studied Hispanic Philology at the University of Valencia.

== Professional career ==
At age 11, she started writing ‘Zodiaccía, a different world’. She spent ten years finishing it and, although it has never been published, she has a special affection for this story. Then, she was sure about being a novelist and she sent her work to several literary contests for years.

At the age of 21, after finishing high school, she decided to study Hispanic Philology in the University of Valencia. She continued sending her work to publishing houses and contests but she did not publish anything until she wrote ‘Finis Mundi’, which was the first book she published. Previously, she wrote 13 books but none of them were brought to light. With ‘Finis Mundi’, the novelist won the ‘Barco de Vapor’ Prize in 1999 after having participated for several years. This contest is celebrated every year by SM publishing house.

After the publishing of her story 'Finis Mundi', she continued with other stories such as 'Mandrágora' or the tetralogy of 'Crónicas de la Torre'. However, although her fame is mainly due to her juvenile novel, she has also published stories aimed at children.

In 2002, she won this contest again, this time with her novel ‘La leyenda del rey errante’. In collaboration with SM publishing house, she has also published ‘El coleccionista de relojes extraordinarios’, the trilogy of ‘Memorias de Idhún’, ‘Donde los árboles cantan’, ‘Dos velas para el diablo’, the saga of ‘Crónicas de la Torre’ and ‘Las hijas de Tara’, this last one as part of the collection “Gran Angular”.

In 2004, she started publishing her second trilogy, called ‘Memorias de Idhún’ (Memorias de Idhún I: La Resistencia, Memorias de Idhún II: Tríada, Memorias de Idhún III: Panteón). This was her biggest success, with more than 750 000 copies sold.

She founded the university magazine ‘Náyade’, which was distributed by the Faculty of Philology at the University of Valencia. She was the co-director from 1997 to 2010.

Afterwards, she has published several independent books, most of them in the fantasy genre, as well as the second part of ‘Alas de fuego’, entitled ‘Alas negras’. She has also entered the realist literature with the serie «Sara y las goleadoras», which includes titles such as: ‘Creando equipo’, ‘Las chicas somos guerreras’, ‘Goleadoras en la liga’, ‘El fútbol y el amor son incompatibles’, ‘Las Goleadoras no se rinden’ and ‘El último gol’. Her novel ‘Donde los árboles cantan’, published in October 2011, won the ‘Premio Nacional de Literatura Infantil y Juvenil’ in 2012. Also, she has won the ‘Cervantes Chico’ Prize. That same year, she returned to children's literature with ‘Mago por casualidad’.

In March 2017, she published ‘Por una rosa’, a book that contains three stories written by three different novelists: Laura Gallego, Javier Ruescas and Benito Taibo. These are three stories set in the universe of the classic tale ‘Beauty and the Beast’.

== Thematic style and characteristic ==
She has explored many of the literary subjects: she began with historical- fantasy literature with her story ‘Finis Mundi but also science-fiction with her story ‘Las hijas de Tara’. Later, she wrote about epic fantasy. This type of literature was reflected in her story ’Memorias de Idhún’. She has also written stories for children.

In her fantasy narrative, particularly with ‘Memorias de Idhún’, the theme of love is just as or more important than the fantasy theme. The characters constantly express their feelings, doubts, misgivings, disappointment, etc., and are guided by them, generally more so than other concepts such as honour or duty. This is what most differentiates her from novelists like Tolkien. Thus, reflection on one's own feeling occupies a lot of the space in the dialogues and the reproduction of thought. This fact is favoured by the decision to employ a passionate love triangle in his story ‘Memorias de Idhún’. She is inspired by some elements from the work of some novelists such as Margaret Weis and Tracy Hickman, particularly from their stories ‘La espada de Joram’, ‘Dragonlance’ and ‘El ciclo de la puerta de la muerte’.

== Books ==
Her books have been translated into a multitude of languages: Bulgarian, Catalan, Danish, English, French, German, Greek, Hungarian, Italian, Japanese, Korean, Norwegian, Polish, Portuguese, Romanian, Russian and Swedish.

- 1999: Finis Mundi (Barco de Vapor Award, 1999)
- 2000: El Valle de los Lobos
- 2002: La maldición del Maestro
- 2003: La llamada de los muertos
- 2004: Fenris, el elfo
- 2004: Memorias de Idhún I: La Resistencia
- 2005: Memorias de Idhún II: Tríada
- 2006: Memorias de Idhún III: Panteón
- 2009: Sara y las goleadoras: Las chicas somos guerreras
- 2009: Sara y las goleadoras: Goleadoras en la liga
- 2010: Sara y las goleadoras: El fútbol y el amor son incompatibles
- 2010: Sara y las goleadoras: Las goleadoras no se rinden
- 2010: Sara y las goleadoras: El último gol
- 2001: El cartero de los sueños
- 2001: Retorno a la Isla Blanca
- 2002: Las hijas de Tara
- 2002: La leyenda del rey errante (Barco de Vapor Award, 2001)
- 2003: Mandrágora
- 2003: ¿Dónde está Alba?
- 2004: El coleccionista de relojes extraordinarios
- 2004: Alas de fuego
- 2004: La hija de la noche
- 2004: Max ya no hace reír
- 2004: Alba tiene una amiga muy especial
- 2005: El fantasma en apuros
- 2007: La emperatriz de los Etéreos
- 2008: Dos velas para el diablo
- 2009: Alas negras
- 2011: Dónde los árboles cantan
- 2012: Mago por casualidad
- 2013: El Libro de los Portales
- 2014: Enciclopedia de Idhún
- 2015: Todas las Hadas del Reino
- 2015: Héroes por casualidad
- 2016: Omnia: todo lo que puedas soñar
- 2017: Cuando me veas
- 2017: Por una rosa
- 2018: Guardianes de la Ciudadela: El bestiario de Axlin
- 2018 (2019 in the US): Guardianes de la Ciudadela: El secreto de Xein
- 2019: Guardianes de la Ciudadela: La misión de Rox
- 2021: El ciclo del eterno emperador
- 2022: Stravagantia
- 2024: Todos los hombres del rey

== Awards ==
The major prize the novelist has received is the ‘Premio Nacional de Literatura Infantil y Juvenil’ in 2012 with her fantasy-epic story ‘Dónde los árboles cantan’. This award, endowed with 20,000 euros, was given by the Ministry of Education, Culture and Sport. This award meant that her story was the best book in children's or juvenile literature published in 2011 in any of the official languages spoken in Spain.

Likewise, in 2011, she was awarded with the ‘Premio Cervantes Chico’ Prize by the City Hall of Alcalá de Henares and the ‘Asociación de Libreros y Papeleros’. She was also awarded with the ‘Premio de Literatura Infantil El Barco de Vapor’ twice. First, in 1999, with her story ‘Finis Mundi’ and then, in 2002, with her story ‘La leyenda del rey errante’. She also received the ‘Imaginamalaga 2013’ Prize with her story ‘El libro de los portales’, and also the ‘Kelvin 505’ Prize in 2016.
